= The Clash discography =

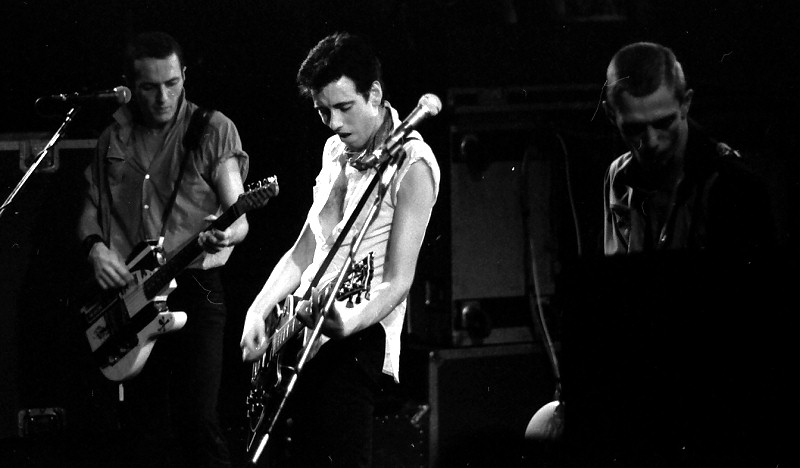
- The Clash live in Oslo, 1980.
- Studio albums: 6
- Extended plays: 2
- Live albums: 2
- Compilation albums: 10
- Singles: 31
- Video albums: 2
- Music videos: 13
- Box sets: 4

The discography of the English punk rock band the Clash consists of six studio albums, two extended plays, two live albums and 31 singles.

== 1977–1978 ==
The Clash's first official recording was the single for "White Riot", released by CBS Records in March 1977. In April, CBS released their self-titled debut album, The Clash, in the United Kingdom, but refused to release it in the United States, saying that the sound was not "radio friendly". A US version of the album with a modified track listing—four songs from the original version were replaced with five non-album singles and B-sides—was released by Epic Records in 1979, after the UK original became the best-selling import album of all time in the United States. Terry Chimes left the band for the second time soon after the recording, so only Joe Strummer, Mick Jones and Paul Simonon were featured on the album's cover, and Chimes was credited as "Tory Crimes". The album ranked number 12 on the UK Albums Chart and number 126 on the Billboard Pop albums chart.

In the same month, the band also released an EP single, Capital Radio, which was given away to NME's readers. In May, CBS released the single "Remote Control" without asking them first, and, in September, "Complete Control", produced by Lee "Scratch" Perry, was Topper Headon's first recording with the band. It rose to number 28 on the British Singles Chart.

In February 1978, the band came out with the single "Clash City Rockers". June saw the release of "(White Man) In Hammersmith Palais". The Clash's second album, Give 'Em Enough Rope, was released by CBS and produced by Sandy Pearlman in November, receiving largely positive reviews. It hit number 2 in the UK, and number 128 on the Billboard chart. The album's first UK single, "Tommy Gun", rose to number 19. In support of the album, the band undertook its first, largely successful tour of the US.

== 1979–1982 ==
In February 1979, CBS released the single, "English Civil War", and in May the EP, The Cost of Living. In August and September 1979, the Clash recorded their third studio album, London Calling. Produced by Guy Stevens, the double album was a mix of different styles, with greater maturity and production polish. London Calling, released in December 1979 by CBS and regarded as one of the greatest rock albums ever recorded, reached number 9 on the British chart and number 27 on the US chart. In the UK, London Calling's title track, released a few days before the album's release, rose to number 11—the highest position any Clash single reached in the UK before the band's breakup. The album's final track, "Train in Vain"—included at the last minute and thus not appearing in the track listing on the cover—was released in the Netherlands, Germany, Spain, Brazil, New Zealand, and Australia in June 1980. The single was not released in the UK, and in the US was backed with "London Calling". It turned out to be the band's biggest US hit to date, reaching number 23 on the Billboard chart.

In August, the band came out with another single, "Bankrobber", which reached number 12 in the UK. In October, Epic released the compilation album Black Market Clash, only in the US. The compilation reached number 74 in the US. In the following November, CBS released the single "The Call Up", which reached number 40 in the UK. In December, CBS released the 3-LP, 36-song Sandinista!. The album again reflected a broad range of musical styles, including extended dubs and the first forays into rap by a major rock band. Produced by the band members with the participation of Mikey Dread, Sandinista! was their most controversial album to date, both politically and musically. The album fared well in America, charting at number 24.

During 1981, the band came out with a single, "Hitsville UK". Released in January, the single reached number 56 in the UK and number 53 on the US Mainstream Rock chart. In April, CBS released the single for the song "The Magnificent Seven" which peaked at number 34 on the UK Singles Chart in 1981, and at number 21 on the US Billboard Club Play Singles in 1982. In the same month, CBS released the 12-inch single "The Magnificent Dance". In November, CBS released the single, "This Is Radio Clash", which further demonstrated their ability to mix diverse influences such as dub and hip hop. It reached number 47 on the UK Singles Chart.

They set to work on their fifth studio album in the fall of 1981. Combat Rock was originally planned to be a 2-LP set with the title Rat Patrol from Fort Bragg, but were unable to mix it to either the group's or to CBS's satisfaction. Glyn Johns, brought in by manager Bernard Rhodes to edit and mix the album, reconceived it as a single LP and had Joe Strummer re-record several vocals. In April 1982, the band released the first single from the album, "Know Your Rights", which reached number 43 in the UK. The album contains two "US-radio friendly" singles, "Should I Stay or Should I Go" and "Rock the Casbah". "Should I Stay or Should I Go" reached number 17 in the UK and number 45 on the US Billboard Hot 100 chart, while "Rock the Casbah" peaked at number 17 in the UK and number 8 on the US Billboard Hot 100. The album itself was the band's most successful, hitting number 2 in the UK and number 7 in the US.

== 1983–present ==
After Combat Rock was released, Topper Headon was asked to leave the band, and then in September 1983, Mick Jones was fired. The first single from Cut the Crap, "This Is England", was released by CBS in September 1985. It reached number 24 in the UK. Cut the Crap, the last studio album of the band, actually composed by Strummer, Simonon, Pete Howard, Nick Sheppard, and Vince White, was produced by Rhodes and released by CBS in November. It reached number 16 in the UK and number 88 in the US. The Clash effectively disbanded in early 1986.

In 1988, Epic released the double-disc, 28-track compilation The Story of the Clash, Volume 1 presenting a relatively thorough overview of their career. In March 1991, a reissue of "Should I Stay or Should I Go" gave the band its first and only number 1 UK single. In the same year, CBS and Epic released the triple-disc, 64-song box set Clash on Broadway that covers their entire career, and the compilation album The Singles, that includes all their singles, except for 1985's "This Is England". In 1993, Epic released Super Black Market Clash, a compilation that contains B-sides and rare tracks not available on their other albums. In 1999, Epic released the compilation album of live material, From Here to Eternity: Live.

The Clash: Westway to the World, a documentary film about the band, was released by Sony Music Entertainment in 2000, and, in 2003, it won the Grammy Award for the best long form music video. In 2003, Epic and Sony BMG released The Essential Clash, a career-spanning greatest hits album and DVD, dedicated to Joe Strummer, who died during the production of the album. In 2004, Sony Legacy released London Calling: 25th Anniversary Edition. It contains The Vanilla Tapes, missing recordings made by the band in mid-1979 during the London Calling sessions, as a bonus disc, and a DVD featuring the making of the album, the music videos for "London Calling", "Train in Vain" and "Clampdown", and video footage of The Clash recording sessions in Wessex Studios. In 2006, Sony BMG released the box set Singles Box which includes all the singles that they released in the UK. In 2007, Sony BMG released The Singles that presents a stripped-down view of the singles of the band. In 2008, Sony Music Entertainment released The Clash Live: Revolution Rock, produced and directed by Don Letts, it features live material and interviews from 1978 to 1983, and, in October, the live album Live at Shea Stadium, which features the recording of the band's second night at Shea Stadium in 1982.

September 2013 saw the arrival of three releases by The Clash: the 12-CD box set Sound System, featuring the band's entire studio catalogue re-mastered (minus Cut the Crap), plus three extra CDs, one DVD and various other materials; 5 Album Studio Set, featuring the band's first five studio albums re-mastered; and the 2-CD, 33-song best of collection The Clash Hits Back. All the music within the three releases had been remastered, mainly by Mick Jones, from the original tapes. Sound System had an enthusiastic reception, and both the 12-CD box set and the best of compilation both entered the UK Albums Chart.

== Studio albums ==
List of studio albums, with selected chart positions and sales certifications
Title	Album details	Peak chart positions										Certifications
Title	Album details	UK	AUS	AUT	CAN	NOR	NZ	SPA	SWE	SWI	US	Certifications
The Clash	Release date: 8 April 1977 (UK), 26 July 1979 (US); Label: Sony Music/Columbia; Epic; Notes: Two versions: UK and US	12	—	—	—	—	—	—	42	—	126	BPI: Gold (UK version); BPI: Silver (US version); RIAA: Gold
Give 'Em Enough Rope	Release date: 10 November 1978; Label: Sony Music/Columbia; Epic	2	79	—	—	—	15	—	36	—	128	BPI: Gold
London Calling	Release date: 14 December 1979; Label: Sony Music/Columbia; Epic; Notes: Released as a double album	9	16	17	12	4	12	52	2	72	27	BPI: 2× Platinum; MC: Gold; RIAA: Platinum
Sandinista!	Release date: 12 December 1980; Label: Sony Music/Columbia; Epic; Notes: Released as a triple album	19	36	—	3	8	3	—	9	—	24	BPI: Silver; RIAA: Gold
Combat Rock	Release date: 14 May 1982; Label: Sony Music (SME)/Columbia; Epic	2	32	—	12	7	5	—	9	56	7	BPI: Gold; MC: Gold; RIAA: 2× Platinum
Cut the Crap	Release date: 4 November 1985; Label: Sony Music/Columbia; Epic	16	69	—	59	—	35	—	30	—	88	BPI: Silver
"—" denotes releases that did not chart or were not released in that country.

== Live albums ==
Title	Album	Peak chart positions				
Title	Album	UK	BEL	FRA	SWE	US
From Here to Eternity: Live	Release date: 4 October 1999; Label: Columbia/Sony Music; Epic; Notes: Live Recordings, 1978–1982	13	—	17	47	193
Live at Shea Stadium	Release date: 6 October 2008; Label: Sony International; Notes: Live recording of second night of Shea Stadium 1982 performance	31	75	57	26	93
"—" denotes releases that did not chart or were not released in that country.

== Compilations ==
Title	Album details	Peak chart positions										Certifications
Title	Album details	UK	AUS	BEL	FRA	GER	NZ	POR	SPA	SWE	US	Certifications
Black Market Clash	Release date: 1980; Label: Epic/Sony Music; Notes: 10" EP collection of B-sides (re-released as a 12" EP in 1981)	—	—	—	—	—	15	—	—	—	74	
The Story of the Clash, Volume 1	Release date: 21 March 1988; Label: Sony Music/Columbia; Epic; Notes: Double album, Greatest hits collection	7	52	—	—	53	3	—	—	50	142	BPI: Gold; RIAA: Platinum; SNEP: 2× Gold
1977 Revisited	Release date: 1990; Label: Relativity; Notes: Also published by Sony Special Products as A Collection of Rare Tracks and B Sides in 1990	—	—	—	—	—	—	—	—	—	—	
The Singles (1991)	Release date: 4 November 1991; Label: Sony Music/Columbia; Epic; Notes: Collection of 18 UK and US singles in chronological order	68	—	—	—	—	2	—	—	—	—	
Super Black Market Clash	Release date: 26 October 1993; Label: Columbia/Sony Music; Legacy/Epic; Notes: Collection of b-sides and rarities	—	—	—	—	—	—	—	—	—	—	
The Essential Clash	Release date: 11 March 2003 (US), 22 April 2003 (UK); Label: Columbia/Sony Music; Legacy/Epic; Notes: Collection of "essential" recordings; two versions: UK and US	18	76	—	—	—	50	—	—	22	99	BPI: Gold
The Singles (2007)	Release date: 4 June 2007; Label: Sony BMG; Notes: Single disc of 19 UK singles including "This Is England" and not in chronological order	13	57	—	—	—	36	22	83	—	—	BPI: Platinum
The Clash Hits Back	Release date: 9 September 2013 (UK), 10 September 2013 (US); Label: Sony Legacy; Notes: 2-CD, 33-song best of collection sequenced to copy the set played by the band at the Brixton Fair Deal on 19 July 1982	13	—	120	174	—	27	—	—	—	—	BPI: Gold
Joe Strummer 001	Release date: 28 September 2018; Label: Sony Legacy; Notes: 32-song collection spanning Strummer's career and includes demos and unreleased versions of songs from the post-Mick Jones era	30	—	145/98	—	68	—	—	27	—	—	
The World According to the Clash	Release date: 13 November 2026; Label: Sony Legacy; Notes: Reissue of US radio promo-only 1982 compilation issued by Epic	75	—	—	—	—	—	—	—	—	—	
"—" denotes releases that did not chart or were not released in that country.

=== Box sets ===
Title	Album details	Peak chart positions		Certifications
Title	Album details	UK	BEL	Certifications
Clash on Broadway	Release date: 19 November 1991; Label: Columbia/Sony Music; Legacy/Epic; Notes: Comprehensive 3-CD box set; includes several alternate versions and unreleased tracks	—	—	BPI: Silver
Singles Box	Release date: 30 October 2006; Label: Sony BMG; Notes: Set of 19 UK singles across 19 CDs	—	—	
Sound System	Release date: 9 September 2013 (UK), 10 September 2013 (US); Label: Sony Legacy; Notes: 12-CD box set featuring the band's entire studio catalogue re-mastered (minus Cut the Crap) plus an additional three discs, DVD and various other items	53	99	
5 Album Studio Set	Release date: 9 September 2013 (UK), 10 September 2013 (US); Label: Sony Legacy; Notes: 8-CD box set featuring the band's first five studio albums re-mastered	—	—	
"—" denotes releases that did not chart or were not released in that country.

== Extended plays ==
Title	EP details	Chart positions	
Title	EP details	UK	IRE
Capital Radio	Release date: 9 April 1977	—	—
The Cost of Living	Release date: 11 May 1979	22	24

== Singles ==
Single	Year	Peak chart positions										Certifications	Album
Single	Year	UK	AUS	AUT	CAN	GER	IRE	NLD	NZ	SWI	US	Certifications	Album
"White Riot" b/w "1977"	1977	38	—	—	—	—	—	—	—	—	—		The Clash
"Remote Control" b/w "London's Burning" (live)	1977	52 (Note: Chart position is from the official UK "Star Breakers List".)	—	—	—	—	—	—	—	—	—		The Clash
"Complete Control" b/w "City of the Dead"	1977	28	—	—	—	—	—	—	—	—	—		Non-album singles (included on the US release of The Clash)
"Clash City Rockers" b/w "Jail Guitar Doors"	1978	35	—	—	—	—	—	—	—	—	—		Non-album singles (included on the US release of The Clash)
"(White Man) In Hammersmith Palais" b/w "The Prisoner"	1978	32	—	—	—	—	—	—	—	—	—		Non-album singles (included on the US release of The Clash)
"Tommy Gun" b/w "1–2 Crush on You"	1978	19	—	—	—	—	—	—	—	—	—		Give 'Em Enough Rope
"English Civil War" b/w "Pressure Drop"	1979	25	—	—	—	—	29	—	—	—	—		Give 'Em Enough Rope
"Groovy Times" b/w "Gates of the West" (Note: Groovy Times was released as a promotional single.)	1979	—	—	—	—	—	—	—	—	—	—		The Cost of Living
"I Fought the Law" (US only) b/w "(White Man) In Hammersmith Palais"	1979	—	—	—	—	—	24	—	—	—	—		The Cost of Living
"London Calling" b/w "Armagideon Time"	1979	11	28	—	—	—	16	—	23	—	—	RMNZ: Platinum	London Calling
"Clampdown" (AUS only) b/w "The Guns of Brixton"	1979	—	—	—	—	—	—	—	—	—	—		London Calling
"Train in Vain" b/w "London Calling"	1980	—	—	—	62	—	—	—	26	—	23	BPI: Silver; RMNZ: Gold	London Calling
"Rudie Can't Fail" (NL only) b/w "Bankrobber" / "Rockers Galore... UK Tour"	1980	—	—	—	—	—	—	—	—	—	—		London Calling
"Bankrobber" b/w "Rockers Galore... UK Tour"	1980	12	—	—	—	—	14	—	14	—	—		Non-album single
"The Call Up" b/w "Stop the World"	1980	40	69	—	—	—	—	—	42	—	—		Sandinista!
"Police on My Back" (AUS only) b/w "The Crooked Beat"	1980	—	—	—	—	—	—	—	—	—	—		Sandinista!
"Hitsville U.K." b/w "Radio One"	1981	56	—	—	—	—	—	—	—	—	—		Sandinista!
"The Magnificent Seven" b/w "The Magnificent Dance"	1981	34	—	—	—	—	—	21	—	—	—		Sandinista!
"Somebody Got Murdered" (Spain only) b/w "Hitsville U.K."	1981	—	—	—	—	—	—	—	—	—	—		Sandinista!
"This Is Radio Clash" b/w "Radio Clash"	1981	47	40	—	—	—	—	—	28	—	—		Non-album single
"Know Your Rights" b/w "First Night Back in London"	1982	43	—	—	—	—	—	—	—	—	—		Combat Rock
"Rock the Casbah" b/w "Long Time Jerk"	1982	30	3	—	26	—	—	21	4	—	8	BPI: 2× Platinum; RIAA: 2× Platinum; RMNZ: 2× Platinum	Combat Rock
"Should I Stay or Should I Go" / "Straight to Hell" (double A-side)	1982	17	37	—	40	—	16	—	—	—	45		Combat Rock
"This Is England" b/w "Do It Now" / "Sex Mad Roar"	1985	24	62	—	—	—	13	—	26	—	—		Cut the Crap
"Are You Red..Y" (AUS only) b/w "Three Card Trick"	1985	—	85	—	—	—	—	—	—	—	—		Cut the Crap
"London Calling" (re-release) b/w "Brand New Cadillac" / "Rudie Can't Fail"	1988	46	—	—	—	—	—	—	—	—	—		The Story of the Clash
"I Fought the Law" b/w "City of the Dead" / "1977"	1988	29	—	—	—	—	—	—	17	—	—	BPI: Gold; RMNZ: Gold	The Story of the Clash
"Return to Brixton" b/w "The Guns of Brixton"	1990	57	—	—	—	—	—	—	—	—	—		Non-album single
"Should I Stay or Should I Go" (re-release) b/w "Rush" (Big Audio Dynamite II)	1991	1	—	5	—	5	2	3	2	4	—	BPI: 3× Platinum; BVMI: Gold; RMNZ: 4× Platinum	The Singles
"Rock the Casbah" (re-release) b/w "Mustapha Dance"	1991	15	—	—	—	—	10	—	—	—	—		The Singles
"London Calling" (second re-release) b/w "Brand New Cadillac"	1991	64	—	—	—	—	18	—	—	—	—		The Singles
"Train in Vain" (re-release) b/w "The Right Profile"	1991	79	—	—	—	—	—	—	—	—	—		The Singles

Notes

- A"London Calling" and "Train in Vain" charted together on the Billboard Hot Dance Club Play chart.
- B"The Magnificent Seven", "The Magnificent Dance", "The Call Up" and "The Cool Out" charted together on the Billboard Hot Dance Club Play chart.
- C"Rock the Casbah" and "Mustapha Dance" charted together on the Billboard Hot Dance Club Play chart.

== Video albums ==
Year	Title	Director
1982	The Clash: Live in Tokyo	The Clash
1985	This Is Video Clash	Lindsey Clinell, Don Letts, Keef & Co
2003	The Essential Clash (DVD); Features: Music videos and live performances; Hell W10 (1983); London Weekend Show's Interview 1976.	Don Letts, Joe Strummer, Keef & Co, Lindsey Clinell
2008	The Clash Live: Revolution Rock	Don Letts

== Film/documentaries ==
Year	Title	Director
1980	Rude Boy	Jack Hazan and David Mingay
2000	Westway to the World	Don Letts
2006	The Clash: Up Close and Personal	
2007	Joe Strummer: The Future Is Unwritten	Julien Temple
2012	The Rise and Fall of The Clash	Danny Garcia
2013	Audio Ammunition	Google

== Music videos ==
Year	Title	Director
1977	"White Riot"	Don Letts
1977	"Complete Control"	Don Letts
1978	"Tommy Gun"	Keef & Co
1979	"London Calling"	Don Letts
1979	"Clampdown"	Don Letts
1980	"Train in Vain"	Don Letts
1980	"Bankrobber"	Don Letts
1980	"The Call Up"	Don Letts
1981	"This Is Radio Clash"	Don Letts
1982	"Rock the Casbah"	Don Letts
1984	"Should I Stay or Should I Go" (live at Shea Stadium)	Don Letts
1984	"Career Opportunities" (live at Shea Stadium)	Don Letts
1988	"I Fought the Law"	Don Letts
1991	"Should I Stay or Should I Go"	Don Letts
2020	"The Magnificent Seven"	Don Letts

== See also ==
- List of The Clash songs
- The Clash on film
- No. 10, Upping St.
- Live at Acton Town Hall
