= List of songs recorded by the Clash =

Songs recorded by English band

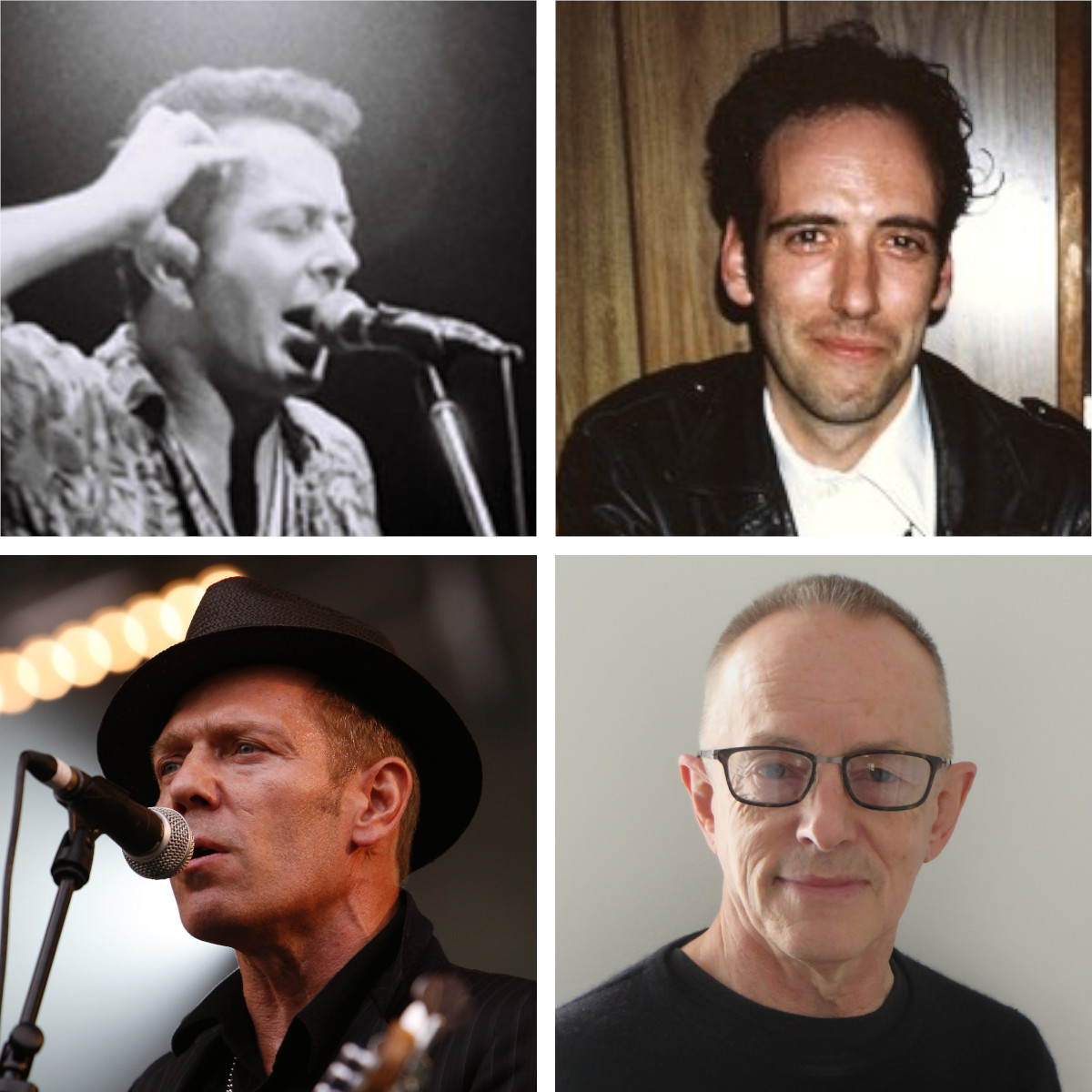
The most well-known lineup of the Clash post breakup. Top: Joe Strummer, Mick Jones; Bottom: Paul Simonon, Topper Headon

This is a comprehensive list of songs recorded by the English rock band the Clash that have been officially released. The list includes songs that have been performed by the band. Other side projects are not included in this list. The list consists of mostly studio recordings; remixes and live recordings are not listed, unless the song has only been released in one of the two formats. Singles are listed as having been released on their respective albums, unless the single has no associated album.

== Songs ==
Name of song, original release, writer(s), producer(s) and year of release
| Song | Original release | Writer(s) | Producer(s) | Year | Ref. |
|---|---|---|---|---|---|
| "1–2, Crush on You" | B-side of "Tommy Gun" | Joe Strummer; Mick Jones | Sandy Pearlman | 1978 | |
| "1977" | B-side of "White Riot" | Joe Strummer; Mick Jones | Micky Foote | 1977 | |
| "48 Hours" | The Clash | Joe Strummer; Mick Jones | Micky Foote | 1977 | |
| "All the Young Punks" | Give 'Em Enough Rope | Joe Strummer; Mick Jones | Sandy Pearlman | 1978 | |
| "Are You Red..Y" | Cut the Crap | Joe Strummer; Bernard Rhodes | Bernard Rhodes | 1985 | |
| "Armagideon Time" | B-side of "London Calling" | Willi Williams; Jackie Mittoo | Guy Stevens | 1979 | |
| "Atom Tan" | Combat Rock | The Clash | The Clash | 1982 | |
| "Bankrobber" | Non-album single | Joe Strummer; Mick Jones | Mikey Dread | 1980 | |
| "The Beautiful People Are Ugly, Too" | Rat Patrol from Fort Bragg | The Clash | – | 1982 | |
| "Blonde Rock & Roll" | Sandinista! | The Clash | Mick Jones | 1980 | |
| "Brand New Cadillac" | London Calling | Vince Taylor | Guy Stevens | 1979 | |
| "Broadway" | Sandinista! | The Clash | The Clash; Mikey Dread | 1980 | |
| "The Call Up" | Sandinista! | The Clash | The Clash; Mikey Dread | 1980 | |
| "Can't Judge" (demo) | Unreleased | – | – | 1980 | |
| "Capital Radio One" | Capital Radio (EP) | Joe Strummer; Mick Jones | Micky Foote | 1977 | |
| "Capital Radio Two" | The Cost of Living (EP) | Joe Strummer; Mick Jones | Bill Price | 1979 | |
| "Car Jamming" | Combat Rock | The Clash | The Clash | 1982 | |
| "The Card Cheat" | London Calling | The Clash | Guy Stevens | 1979 | |
| "Career Opportunities" | The Clash | Joe Strummer; Mick Jones | Micky Foote | 1977 | |
| "Charlie Don't Surf" | Sandinista! | The Clash | The Clash; Mikey Dread | 1980 | |
| "Cheapskates" | Give 'Em Enough Rope | Joe Strummer; Mick Jones | Sandy Pearlman | 1978 | |
| "Cheat" | The Clash | Joe Strummer; Mick Jones | Micky Foote | 1977 | |
| "The City of the Dead" | Black Market Clash | Joe Strummer; Mick Jones | The Clash; Paul Simonon; Sandy Pearlman | 1980 | |
| "Clampdown" | London Calling | Joe Strummer; Mick Jones | Guy Stevens | 1979 | |
| "Clash City Rockers" | Non album single "Clash City Rockers" | Joe Strummer; Mick Jones | Micky Foote; Lee Perry; The Clash; Bill Price | 1978 | |
| "Complete Control" | The Clash (1979 US version) | Joe Strummer; Mick Jones | Micky Foote; Lee Perry; The Clash; Bill Price | 1979 | |
| "Cool Confusion" | B-side of "Should I Stay or Should I Go" | The Clash | The Clash | 1982 | |
| "The Cool Out" | B-side of "The Magnificent Seven" (14" Maxi-single) | The Clash | The Clash | 1981 | |
| "Cool Under Heat" | Cut the Crap | Joe Strummer; Bernard Rhodes | Bernard Rhodes | 1985 | |
| "Corner Soul" | Sandinista! | The Clash | The Clash; Mikey Dread | 1980 | |
| "The Crooked Beat" | Sandinista! | The Clash | The Clash; Mikey Dread | 1980 | |
| "Deadly Serious" | – | Joe Strummer; Mick Jones | – | 1976 | |
| "Death Is a Star" | Combat Rock | The Clash | The Clash | 1982 | |
| "Death or Glory" | London Calling | Joe Strummer; Mick Jones | Guy Stevens | 1979 | |
| "Deny" | The Clash | Joe Strummer; Mick Jones | Micky Foote | 1977 | |
| "Dictator" | Cut the Crap | Joe Strummer; Bernard Rhodes | Bernard Rhodes | 1985 | |
| "Dirty Punk" | Cut the Crap | Joe Strummer; Bernard Rhodes | Bernard Rhodes | 1985 | |
| "Do It Now" | B-side of "This Is England" | Joe Strummer; Bernard Rhodes | Bernard Rhodes | 1985 | |
| "Drug-Stabbing Time" | Give 'Em Enough Rope | Joe Strummer; Mick Jones | Sandy Pearlman | 1978 | |
| "English Civil War" | Give 'Em Enough Rope | Traditional arr. by Joe Strummer and Mick Jones | Sandy Pearlman | 1978 | |
| "The Equaliser" | Sandinista! | The Clash | The Clash; Mikey Dread | 1980 | |
| "Every Little Bit Hurts" | Clash on Broadway | Ed Cobb | The Clash; Micky Foote; Mikey Dread; Sandy Pearlman; Bill Price; Guy Stevens; Lee Perry | 1991 | |
| "Fingerpoppin'" | Cut the Crap | Joe Strummer; Bernard Rhodes | Bernard Rhodes | 1985 | |
| "First Night Back in London" | B-side of "Know Your Rights" | Joe Strummer; Mick Jones | The Clash | 1982 | |
| "Four Horsemen" | London Calling | Joe Strummer; Mick Jones | Guy Stevens | 1979 | |
| "Fujiyama Mama (Pearl Harbour)" | – | The Clash | – | 1982 | |
| "The Fulham Connection" | Rat Patrol from Fort Bragg | The Clash | – | 1982 | |
| "Garageland" | The Clash | Joe Strummer; Mick Jones | Micky Foote | 1977 | |
| "Gates of the West" | The Cost of Living (EP) | Joe Strummer; Mick Jones | Bill Price | 1979 | |
| "Ghetto Defendant" | Combat Rock | The Clash | The Clash | 1982 | |
| "Groovy Times" | The Cost of Living (EP) | Joe Strummer; Mick Jones | Bill Price | 1979 | |
| "The Guns of Brixton" | London Calling | Paul Simonon | Guy Stevens | 1979 | |
| "Guns on the Roof" | Give 'Em Enough Rope | The Clash | Sandy Pearlman | 1978 | |
| "Hate and War" | The Clash | Joe Strummer; Mick Jones | Micky Foote | 1977 | |
| "Hateful" | London Calling | Joe Strummer; Mick Jones | Guy Stevens | 1979 | |
| "Heart & Mind" | London Calling (25th Anniversary Edition) | Joe Strummer; Mick Jones | Guy Stevens | 2004 | |
| "Hell W10" | Rat Patrol from Fort Bragg | The Clash | Possible working title for Straight to Hell | 1982 | |
| "Hitsville UK" | Sandinista! | The Clash | The Clash; Mikey Dread | 1980 | |
| "House of the Ju Ju Queen" (demo) | Unreleased | – | – | 1980 | |
| "How Can I Understand the Flies?" | – | Joe Strummer; Mick Jones | – | 1976 | |
| "I'm Not Down" | London Calling | Joe Strummer; Mick Jones | Guy Stevens | 1979 | |
| "I'm So Bored with You" | – | Mick Jones | – | 1976 | |
| "I'm So Bored with the USA" | The Clash | Joe Strummer; Mick Jones | Micky Foote | 1977 | |
| "I Fought the Law" | The Cost of Living (EP) | Sonny Curtis | Bill Price | 1979 | |
| "I Know What I Think About You" | – | Joe Strummer; Mick Jones | – | 1976 | |
| "I Never Did It?" | – | Mick Jones | – | 1976 | |
| "Idle in Kangaroo Court W1" | Rat Patrol from Fort Bragg | The Clash | – | 1982 | |
| "If Music Could Talk" | Sandinista! | The Clash; Mikey Dread | The Clash; Mikey Dread | 1980 | |
| "Inoculated City" | Combat Rock | The Clash | The Clash | 1982 | |
| "Ivan Meets G.I. Joe" | Sandinista! | The Clash | The Clash; Mikey Dread | 1980 | |
| "Jail Guitar Doors" | B-side of "Clash City Rockers" | Joe Strummer; Mick Jones | Micky Foote; Lee Perry; The Clash; Bill Price | 1978 | |
| "Janie Jones" | The Clash | Joe Strummer; Mick Jones | Micky Foote | 1977 | |
| "Jimmy Jazz" | London Calling | Joe Strummer; Mick Jones | Guy Stevens | 1979 | |
| "Julie's Been Working for the Drug Squad" | Give 'Em Enough Rope | Joe Strummer; Mick Jones | Sandy Pearlman | 1978 | |
| "Junco Partner" | Sandinista! | Traditional | The Clash; Mikey Dread | 1980 | |
| "Junkie Slip" | Sandinista! | The Clash | The Clash; Mikey Dread | 1980 | |
| "Justice Tonight" | B-side of "London Calling" | Willi Williams; Jackie Mittoo | Guy Stevens | 1979 | |
| "Kick It Over" | B-side of "London Calling" | Willi Williams; Jackie Mittoo | Guy Stevens | 1979 | |
| "Kill Time" | Rat Patrol from Fort Bragg | The Clash | – | 1982 | |
| "King of the Road" | Sandinista! | Roger Miller | Mick Jones | 1980 | |
| "Kingston Advice" | Sandinista! | The Clash | The Clash; Mikey Dread | 1980 | |
| "Know Your Rights" | Combat Rock | Joe Strummer; Mick Jones | The Clash | 1982 | |
| "Koka Kola" | London Calling | Joe Strummer; Mick Jones | Guy Stevens | 1979 | |
| "Last Gang in Town" | Give 'Em Enough Rope | Joe Strummer; Mick Jones | Sandy Pearlman | 1978 | |
| "The Leader" | Sandinista! | The Clash | The Clash; Mikey Dread | 1980 | |
| "Let's Go Crazy" | Sandinista! | The Clash | The Clash; Mikey Dread | 1980 | |
| "Life Is Wild" | Cut the Crap | Joe Strummer; Bernard Rhodes | Bernard Rhodes | 1985 | |
| "Lightning Strikes (Not Once But Twice)" | Sandinista! | The Clash | The Clash; Mikey Dread | 1980 | |
| "Listen" | Capital Radio (EP) | Joe Strummer; Mick Jones | Micky Foote | 1977 | |
| "Living in Fame" | Sandinista! | The Clash; Mikey Dread | The Clash; Mikey Dread | 1980 | |
| "London Calling" | London Calling | Joe Strummer; Mick Jones | Guy Stevens | 1979 | |
| "London's Burning" | The Clash | Joe Strummer; Mick Jones | Micky Foote | 1977 | |
| "Lonesome Me" | London Calling (25th Anniversary Edition) | The Clash | Guy Stevens | 2004 | |
| "Long Time Jerk" | B-side of "Rock the Casbah" | Paul Simonon | The Clash | 1982 | |
| "Look Here" | Sandinista! | Mose Allison | The Clash; Mikey Dread | 1980 | |
| "Lose This Skin" | Sandinista! | Tymon Dogg | The Clash; Mikey Dread | 1980 | |
| "Lost in the Supermarket" | London Calling | Joe Strummer; Mick Jones | Guy Stevens | 1979 | |
| "Louie Louie" | – | Richard Berry | – | 1977 | |
| "Lover's Rock" | London Calling | Joe Strummer; Mick Jones | Guy Stevens | 1979 | |
| "The Magnificent Dance" | B-side of "The Magnificent Seven" | The Clash | The Clash | 1981 | |
| "The Magnificent Seven" | Sandinista! | The Clash | The Clash; Mikey Dread | 1980 | |
| "The Man in Me" | London Calling (25th Anniversary Edition) | Bob Dylan | Guy Stevens | 2004 | |
| "Mark Me Absent" | – | Mick Jones | – | 1976 | |
| "Mensforth Hill" | Sandinista! | The Clash | The Clash; Mikey Dread | 1980 | |
| "Midnight Log" | Sandinista! | The Clash | The Clash; Mikey Dread | 1980 | |
| "Midnight to Stevens" | Clash on Broadway | The Clash | The Clash; Micky Foote; Mikey Dread; Sandy Pearlman; Bill Price; Guy Stevens; Lee Perry | 1991 | |
| "Mona" (demo) | Unreleased | – | – | 1980 | |
| "Movers and Shakers" | Cut the Crap | Joe Strummer; Bernard Rhodes | Bernard Rhodes | 1985 | |
| "Mustapha Dance" | B-side of "Rock the Casbah" (CD Maxi-single) | The Clash | The Clash | 1982 | |
| "North and South" | Cut the Crap | Joe Strummer; Bernard Rhodes | Bernard Rhodes | 1985 | |
| "One Emotion" | Clash on Broadway | Joe Strummer; Mick Jones | The Clash; Micky Foote; Mikey Dread; Sandy Pearlman; Bill Price; Guy Stevens; Lee Perry | 1991 | |
| "One More Dub" | Sandinista! | The Clash; Mikey Dread | The Clash; Mikey Dread | 1980 | |
| "One More Time" | Sandinista! | The Clash; Mikey Dread | The Clash; Mikey Dread | 1980 | |
| "Outside Broadcast" | B-side of "This Is Radio Clash" (14" single) | The Clash | The Clash | 1981 | |
| "Overpowered by Funk" | Combat Rock | The Clash | The Clash | 1982 | |
| "Paul's Tune" | London Calling (25th Anniversary Edition) | Paul Simonon | Guy Stevens | 2004 | |
| "Play to Win" | Cut the Crap | Joe Strummer; Bernard Rhodes | Bernard Rhodes | 1985 | |
| "Police and Thieves" | The Clash | Junior Murvin; Lee "Scratch" Perry | Micky Foote | 1977 | |
| "Police on My Back" | Sandinista! | Eddy Grant | The Clash, Mikey Dread | 1980 | |
| "The Police Walked in 4 Jazz" | London Calling (25th Anniversary Edition) | Joe Strummer; Mick Jones | Guy Stevens | 2004 | |
| "Pressure Drop" | B-side of "English Civil War" | Toots Hibbert | Sandy Pearlman | 1979 | |
| "The Prisoner" | B-side of "(White Man) In Hammersmith Palais" | Joe Strummer; Mick Jones | The Clash | 1978 | |
| "Protex Blue" | The Clash | Joe Strummer; Mick Jones | Micky Foote | 1977 | |
| "Radio Five" | B-side of "This Is Radio Clash" | The Clash | The Clash | 1981 | |
| "Radio Clash" | B-side of "This Is Radio Clash" | The Clash | The Clash | 1981 | |
| "RAF 1810" | – | Possible working title for Tommy Gun. | – | 1978 | |
| "Rebel Waltz" | Sandinista! | The Clash | The Clash; Mikey Dread | 1980 | |
| "Red Angel Dragnet" | Combat Rock | The Clash | The Clash | 1982 | |
| "Remote Control" | The Clash | Joe Strummer; Mick Jones | Micky Foote | 1977 | |
| "Revolution Rock" | London Calling | Jackie Edwards; Danny Ray | Guy Stevens | 1979 | |
| "The Right Profile" | London Calling | Joe Strummer; Mick Jones | Guy Stevens | 1979 | |
| "Robber Dub" | Black Market Clash | Joe Strummer; Mick Jones | The Clash; Paul Simonon; Sandy Pearlman | 1980 | |
| "Rock the Casbah" | Combat Rock | Topper Headon; Joe Strummer; Mick Jones | The Clash | 1982 | |
| "Rockers Galore...UK Tour" | B-side of "Bankrobber" | Mikey Dread | Mikey Dread | 1980 | |
| "Rudie Can't Fail" | London Calling | Joe Strummer; Mick Jones | Guy Stevens | 1979 | |
| "Safe European Home" | Give 'Em Enough Rope | Joe Strummer; Mick Jones | Sandy Pearlman | 1978 | |
| "Sean Flynn" | Combat Rock | The Clash | The Clash | 1982 | |
| "Sex Mad Roar" | B-side of "This Is England" (14" single) | Joe Strummer; Bernard Rhodes | Bernard Rhodes | 1985 | |
| "Shepherds Delight" | Sandinista! | The Clash; Mikey Dread | The Clash; Mikey Dread | 1980 | |
| "Should I Stay or Should I Go" | Combat Rock | The Clash | The Clash | 1982 | |
| "Silicone on Sapphire" | Sandinista! | The Clash | The Clash; Mikey Dread | 1980 | |
| "Sitting at My Party" | – | Mick Jones | – | 1976 | |
| "Somebody Got Murdered" | Sandinista! | The Clash | The Clash; Mikey Dread | 1980 | |
| "Something About England" | Sandinista! | The Clash | The Clash; Mikey Dread | 1980 | |
| "The Sound of Sinners" | Sandinista! | The Clash | The Clash; Mikey Dread | 1980 | |
| "Spanish Bombs" | London Calling | Joe Strummer; Mick Jones | Guy Stevens | 1979 | |
| "Stay Free" | Give 'Em Enough Rope | Joe Strummer; Mick Jones | Sandy Pearlman | 1978 | |
| "Stop the World" | B-side of "The Call Up" | The Clash | The Clash | 1980 | |
| "Straight to Hell" | Combat Rock | The Clash | The Clash | 1982 | |
| "The Street Parade" | Sandinista! | The Clash | The Clash; Mikey Dread | 1980 | |
| "This Is England" | Cut the Crap | Joe Strummer; Bernard Rhodes | Bernard Rhodes | 1985 | |
| "This Is Radio Clash" | Non-album single | The Clash | The Clash | 1981 | |
| "Three Card Trick" | Cut the Crap | Joe Strummer; Bernard Rhodes | Bernard Rhodes | 1985 | |
| "Time Is Tight" | Black Market Clash | Booker T. Jones | The Clash; Paul Simonon; Sandy Pearlman | 1980 | |
| "Tommy Gun" | Give 'Em Enough Rope | Joe Strummer; Mick Jones | Sandy Pearlman | 1978 | |
| "Train in Vain" | London Calling | Joe Strummer; Mick Jones | Guy Stevens | 1979 | |
| "Up in Heaven (Not Only Here)" | Sandinista! | The Clash | The Clash; Mikey Dread | 1980 | |
| "Up-Toon" | London Calling (25th Anniversary Edition) | Joe Strummer; Mick Jones | Guy Stevens | 2004 | |
| "Version City" | Sandinista! | The Clash | The Clash; Mikey Dread | 1980 | |
| "Version Pardner" | Sandinista! | The Clash | The Clash; Mikey Dread | 1980 | |
| "Walk Evil Talk" | Rat Patrol from Fort Bragg | The Clash | – | 1982 | |
| "Walking the Slidewalk" | London Calling (25th Anniversary Edition) | Joe Strummer; Mick Jones | Guy Stevens | 2004 | |
| "Washington Bullets" | Sandinista! | The Clash | The Clash; Mikey Dread | 1980 | |
| "We Are the Clash" | Cut the Crap | Joe Strummer; Bernard Rhodes | Bernard Rhodes | 1985 | |
| "What's My Name?" | The Clash | Joe Strummer; Mick Jones; Keith Levene | Micky Foote | 1977 | |
| "Where You Gonna Go (Soweto)" | London Calling (25th Anniversary Edition) | Joe Strummer; Mick Jones | Guy Stevens | 2004 | |
| "(White Man) In Hammersmith Palais" | Non-album single | Joe Strummer; Mick Jones | Sandy Pearlman | 1978 | |
| "White Riot" | The Clash | Joe Strummer; Mick Jones | Micky Foote | 1977 | |
| "Working and Waiting" | London Calling | Joe Strummer; Mick Jones | Guy Stevens | 1979 | |
| "Wrong 'Em Boyo" | London Calling | Clive Alphonso | Guy Stevens | 1979 | |

== See also ==
- The Clash discography
- The Clash on film
