= The Singles (2007 The Clash album) =

Compilation album by The Clash
- Released: 4 June 2007
- Recorded: 1977–1985
- Genre: Punk rock, dance-punk, new wave
- Length: 67:38
- Label: Sony BMG
- Producer: Lee "Scratch" Perry, Bill Price, Sandy Pearlman, Guy Stevens and Jose Unidos

The Clash compilations and lives chronology
Singles Box (2006)	The Singles (2007)	Live at Shea Stadium (2008)

Professional ratings
Review scores
Source	Rating
AllMusic	4/5 stars
Pitchfork	9.0/10

The Singles is a 2007 compilation album by British punk rock band the Clash that presents the singles of the band's career, it does not include any of the B-sides incorporated into the release of the earlier collection and compiled onto a single disc.

== Track listing ==
1. "London Calling" (from London Calling)
2. "Rock the Casbah" (from Combat Rock)
3. "Should I Stay or Should I Go" (from Combat Rock)
4. "I Fought the Law" (from The Cost of Living and The Clash (US))
5. "(White Man) In Hammersmith Palais" (from The Clash (US))
6. "The Magnificent Seven" (from Sandinista!)
7. "Bankrobber" (from Black Market Clash)
8. "The Call Up" (from Sandinista!)
9. "Complete Control" (from The Clash (US))
10. "White Riot" (from The Clash (UK))
11. "Remote Control" (from The Clash (UK))
12. "Tommy Gun" (from Give 'Em Enough Rope)
13. "Clash City Rockers" (from The Clash (US))
14. "English Civil War" (from Give 'Em Enough Rope)
15. "Hitsville U.K." (from Sandinista!)
16. "Know Your Rights" (from Combat Rock)
17. "This Is England" (from Cut the Crap)
18. "This Is Radio Clash" (from This is Radio Clash)
19. "Train in Vain" (from London Calling)
20. "Groovy Times" (from The Cost of Living) (bonus track on some versions)

== Charts ==
Chart performance for The Singles
Chart (2007–2009)	Peak position
Australian Albums (ARIA)	57
New Zealand Albums (RMNZ)	36
Portuguese Albums (AFP)	22
Scottish Albums (OCC)	11
Swedish Albums (Sverigetopplistan)	83
UK Albums (OCC)	13

== Certifications ==
Certifications for The Singles
Region	Certification	Certified units/sales
New Zealand (RMNZ)	Gold	7,500^{^}
United Kingdom (BPI)	Platinum	300,000^{*}
^{*} Sales figures based on certification alone.^{^} Shipments figures based on certification alone.
