= Sound System (album) =

Box set by The Clash
- Released: 9 September 2013
- Recorded: 1977–1982
- Genre: Punk rock
- Label: Sony Legacy
- Producers: The Clash, Micky Foote, Sandy Pearlman, Bill Price, Guy Stevens, Jose Unidos, Lee "Scratch" Perry, Julien Temple, Don Letts

The Clash compilations and lives chronology
Live at Shea Stadium (2008)	Sound System (2013)	The Clash Hits Back (2013)

Sound System is a box set collection by the Clash released in September 2013. The box contains the band's studio albums (but excludes the post-breakup album Cut the Crap) newly re-mastered by Mick Jones, with a further three discs featuring demos, non-album singles, rarities and B-sides, a DVD with previously unseen footage by both Don Letts and Julien Temple, original promo videos and live footage, plus an owner's manual booklet, reprints of the band's original 'Armagideon Times' fanzine and merchandise including dog tags, badges, stickers and a poster. The boom box packaging was designed by Paul Simonon. The set was released simultaneously with 5 Album Studio Set, which contains only the five studio albums, and a greatest hits package titled The Clash Hits Back.

In a September 2013 interview, Mick Jones announced the box sets and hits package will be the final time he works on anything involving the Clash and their music. "I'm not even thinking about any more Clash releases. This is it for me, and I say that with an exclamation mark", Jones said.

== Remastering ==
Mick Jones said, "The concept of the whole thing is best box set ever. Re-mastering's a really amazing thing. That was the musical point of it all, because there's so much there that you wouldn't have heard before. It was like discovering stuff, because the advances in mastering are so immense since the last time [the Clash catalogue] was remastered in the 90s."

All the music has been remastered from the original tapes, Jones said. "We had to bake the tapes beforehand – the oxide on them is where the music is, so if you don't put them in the oven and bake them, that all falls off, because they're so old."

Bassist Simonon highlighted a guitar line on "Safe European Home", from the band's second album, Give 'Em Enough Rope, saying he'd never even heard it before. "It's probably some session musician, while I was asleep", Jones joked.

== Reception ==
Professional ratings
Aggregate scores
Source	Rating
Metacritic	97/100
Review scores
Source	Rating
AllMusic	4.5/5 stars
Classic Rock	5/5 stars
Drowned in Sound	9/10
Mojo	5/5 stars
Paste	9.5/10
Q	5/5 stars
Rolling Stone	5/5 stars
Spin	9/10
The Telegraph	5/5 stars
Under the Radar	9/10

PopMatters journalist J.C. Maçek III wrote "The initial interest may come in the fact that the packaging looks like a classic Boom Box emblazoned with 'THE CLASH' in a military stencil with the overall box decorated in a Combat Rock reminiscent camouflage. This is definitely a visual treat for Clash fans to add to their mantle."

Rob Sheffield of Rolling Stone said "It takes a band as myth-saturated as the Clash to live up to a career-summing box as ambitious as this one. But Joe Strummer and his crew of London gutter-punk romantics fit the bill."

The Telegraph's Patrick Sawer wrote "The tracks, remastered by the band’s guitarist Mick Jones and Tim Young (who won a Grammy for his work on the Beatles 2006 Love album), sound fresh as ever, crisper even. Jones, the official muso of the band, said that during the remastering process he discovered guitar lines he couldn’t remember and previously buried instrumental details certainly stand out – along with Strummer’s biting ad-libs."

== Track listing ==
All tracks are written by Joe Strummer and Mick Jones, except where noted.

The Clash (UK Version) (1 CD)
No.	Title	Lead vocals	Length
1.	"Janie Jones"	Strummer	2:03
2.	"Remote Control"	Jones, Strummer	3:00
3.	"I'm So Bored with the U.S.A."	Strummer	2:25
4.	"White Riot"	Strummer	1:56
5.	"Hate & War"	Jones, Strummer	2:05
6.	"What's My Name?" (written by Strummer, Jones, Keith Levene)	Strummer	1:40
7.	"Deny"	Strummer	3:03
8.	"London's Burning"	Strummer	2:12
9.	"Career Opportunities"	Strummer	1:52
10.	"Cheat"	Strummer	2:06
11.	"Protex Blue"	Jones	1:42
12.	"Police & Thieves" (written by Junior Murvin, Lee Perry)	Strummer	6:01
13.	"48 Hours"	Strummer	1:34
14.	"Garageland"	Strummer	3:12

All tracks are written by Joe Strummer and Mick Jones, except where noted. All lead vocals by Strummer, except "Stay Free" by Jones.

Give 'Em Enough Rope (1 CD)
No.	Title	Length
1.	"Safe European Home"	3:50
2.	"English Civil War" (Traditional; arranged by Jones and Strummer)	2:35
3.	"Tommy Gun"	3:17
4.	"Julie's Been Working for the Drug Squad"	3:03
5.	"Last Gang in Town"	5:14
6.	"Guns on the Roof" (written by Topper Headon, Jones, Paul Simonon, Strummer)	3:15
7.	"Drug-Stabbing Time"	3:43
8.	"Stay Free"	3:40
9.	"Cheapskates"	3:25
10.	"All the Young Punks (New Boots and Contracts)"	4:55

All tracks are written by Joe Strummer and Mick Jones, except where noted.

London Calling (2 CDs)
No.	Title	Lead vocals	Length
1.	"London Calling"	Strummer	3:19
2.	"Brand New Cadillac" (written and originally performed by Vince Taylor)	Strummer	2:09
3.	"Jimmy Jazz"	Strummer	3:52
4.	"Hateful"	Strummer	2:45
5.	"Rudie Can't Fail"	Strummer, Jones	3:26
6.	"Spanish Bombs"	Strummer, Jones	3:19
7.	"The Right Profile"	Strummer	3:56
8.	"Lost in the Supermarket"	Jones	3:47
9.	"Clampdown"	Strummer, Jones	3:49
10.	"The Guns of Brixton" (written by Paul Simonon)	Simonon	3:07
11.	"Wrong 'Em Boyo" (written by Clive Alphonso; originally performed by the Rulers; including Stagger Lee)	Strummer	3:10
12.	"Death or Glory"	Strummer	3:55
13.	"Koka Kola"	Strummer	1:46
14.	"The Card Cheat"	Jones	3:51
15.	"Lover's Rock"	Strummer	4:01
16.	"Four Horsemen"	Strummer	2:56
17.	"I'm Not Down"	Jones	3:00
18.	"Revolution Rock" (written by Jackie Edwards, Danny Ray; originally performed by Danny Ray and the Revolutionaries)	Strummer	5:37
19.	"Train in Vain"	Jones	3:09

All tracks are written by The Clash, except where noted.

Sandinista! (3 CDs)
No.	Title	Lead vocals	Length
1.	"The Magnificent Seven"	Joe Strummer	5:28
2.	"Hitsville U.K."	Mick Jones, Ellen Foley	4:20
3.	"Junco Partner" ("writer, at present, unknown" on liner notes)	Joe Strummer	4:53
4.	"Ivan Meets G.I. Joe"	Topper Headon	3:05
5.	"The Leader"	Joe Strummer	1:41
6.	"Something About England"	Mick Jones, Joe Strummer	3:42
7.	"Rebel Waltz"	Joe Strummer	3:25
8.	"Look Here" (written by Mose Allison)	Joe Strummer	2:44
9.	"The Crooked Beat"	Paul Simonon	5:29
10.	"Somebody Got Murdered"	Mick Jones	3:34
11.	"One More Time" (written by The Clash and Mikey Dread)	Joe Strummer	3:32
12.	"One More Dub" (Dub version of "One More Time"; written by The Clash and Dread)	Instrumental	3:34
13.	"Lightning Strikes (Not Once but Twice)"	Joe Strummer	4:51
14.	"Up in Heaven (Not Only Here)"	Mick Jones	4:31
15.	"Corner Soul"	Joe Strummer	2:43
16.	"Let's Go Crazy"	Joe Strummer	4:25
17.	"If Music Could Talk" (written by The Clash and Dread)	Joe Strummer	4:36
18.	"The Sound of Sinners"	Joe Strummer	4:00
19.	"Police on My Back" (written by Eddy Grant; originally performed by The Equals)	Mick Jones	3:15
20.	"Midnight Log"	Joe Strummer	2:11
21.	"The Equaliser"	Joe Strummer	5:47
22.	"The Call Up"	Joe Strummer	5:25
23.	"Washington Bullets"	Joe Strummer	3:51
24.	"Broadway" (Features an Epilogue of "The Guns of Brixton" sung by Maria Gallagher)	Joe Strummer	5:45
25.	"Lose This Skin" (written by Tymon Dogg)	Tymon Dogg	5:07
26.	"Charlie Don't Surf"	Joe Strummer, Mick Jones	4:55
27.	"Mensforth Hill" ("Something About England" backwards with overdubs)	Instrumental	3:42
28.	"Junkie Slip"	Joe Strummer	2:48
29.	"Kingston Advice"	Joe Strummer	2:36
30.	"The Street Parade"	Joe Strummer	3:26
31.	"Version City"	Joe Strummer	4:23
32.	"Living in Fame" (Dub Version of "If Music Could Talk"; written by The Clash and Dread)	Mikey Dread	4:36
33.	"Silicone on Sapphire" (Dub version of "Washington Bullets")	Joe Strummer	4:32
34.	"Version Pardner" (Dub version of "Junco Partner")	Joe Strummer	5:22
35.	"Career Opportunities"	Luke Gallagher, Ben Gallagher	2:30
36.	"Shepherds Delight" (Dub Version of "Police & Thieves")	Instrumental	3:25

All tracks are written by The Clash, except where noted.

Combat Rock (1 CD)
No.	Title	Lead vocals	Length
1.	"Know Your Rights" (Strummer/Jones)	Joe Strummer	3:39
2.	"Car Jamming"	Joe Strummer	3:58
3.	"Should I Stay or Should I Go"	Mick Jones	3:06
4.	"Rock the Casbah" (Headon/The Clash)	Joe Strummer	3:44
5.	"Red Angel Dragnet"	Paul Simonon/Kosmo Vinyl	3:48
6.	"Straight to Hell"	Joe Strummer	5:30
7.	"Overpowered by Funk"	Joe Strummer/Futura 2000	4:55
8.	"Atom Tan"	Mick Jones/Joe Strummer	2:32
9.	"Sean Flynn"	Joe Strummer	4:30
10.	"Ghetto Defendant"	Joe Strummer/Allen Ginsberg	4:45
11.	"Inoculated City"	Mick Jones	2:43
12.	"Death Is a Star"	Joe Strummer/Mick Jones	3:13

Sound System extras (1 CD)
No.	Title	Lead vocals	Length
1.	""White Riot"" (Single version)	Joe Strummer	1:59
2.	"1977"	Joe Strummer	1:40
3.	"Listen/Interviews"	Instrumental	11:08
4.	"Capital Radio"	Joe Strummer	2:08
5.	"London's Burning"	Joe Strummer	2:11
6.	"Complete Control"	Joe Strummer	3:13
7.	"City of the Dead"	Joe Strummer	2:22
8.	"Clash City Rockers"	Joe Strummer	3:57
9.	"Jail Guitar Doors"	Mick Jones	3:04
10.	"(White Man) in Hammersmith Palais"	Joe Strummer	4:01
11.	"The Prisoner"	Mick Jones	3:03
12.	"1–2 Crush on You"	Mick Jones	2:59
13.	"Time Is Tight" (Booker T. Jones)	Instrumental	4:04
14.	"Pressure Drop" (Toots Hibbert)	Joe Strummer	3:25
15.	"I Fought The Law" (Sonny Curtis)	Joe Strummer	2:43
16.	"Groovy Times"	Joe Strummer	3:26
17.	"Gates of the West"	Mick Jones	3:25
18.	"Capital Radio Two"	Joe Strummer	3:20
19.	"Armagideon Time" (Willi Williams)	Joe Strummer	3:52
20.	"Bankrobber"	Joe Strummer	4:33
21.	"Rockers Galore...UK Tour" (written by The Clash and Mikey Dread)	Mikey Dread	4:39

Sound System extras disc 2 (1 CD)
No.	Title	Lead vocals	Length
1.	"The Magnificent Dance" (Dance remix of "The Magnificent Seven")	Joe Strummer	5:36
2.	"Midnight To Stevens"	Joe Strummer	4:36
3.	"Radio One"	Mikey Dread	6:17
4.	"Stop The World"	Joe Strummer	2:32
5.	"The Cool Out" (Dub version of "The Call Up")	Instrumental	3:53
6.	"This Is Radio Clash"	Joe Strummer	4:11
7.	"Radio Clash"	Joe Strummer	4:11
8.	"First Night Back in London"	Joe Strummer	2:59
9.	"Rock The Casbah" (Bob Clearmountain 12" mix)	Joe Strummer	3:42
10.	"Long Time Jerk"	Joe Strummer	5:08
11.	"The Beautiful People Are Ugly Too" (Combat Rock outtake; Previously Unreleased)	Joe Strummer	3:46
12.	"Idle in Kangaroo Court" (Combat Rock outtake listed as Kill Time; Previously Unreleased)	Joe Strummer	5:04
13.	"Ghetto Defendant" (Unedited version; Previously Unreleased)	Joe Strummer/Allen Ginsberg	6:13
14.	"Cool Confusion"	Joe Strummer	3:12
15.	"Sean Flynn" (Extended 'Marcus Music' version; Previously Unreleased)	Joe Strummer	7:22
16.	"Straight to Hell" (Extended unedited version from Clash on Broadway)	Joe Strummer	6:50

Sound System extras disc 3 (1 CD)
No.	Title	Lead vocals	Length
1.	"I'm So Bored with the U.S.A." (first ever recording session at Beaconsfield Film School 1976 produced by Julien Temple)	Joe Strummer	2:22
2.	"London's Burning" (first ever recording session at Beaconsfield Film School 1976 produced by Julien Temple (Previously Unreleased))	Joe Strummer	1:57
3.	"White Riot" (first ever recording session at Beaconsfield Film School 1976 produced by Julien Temple)	Joe Strummer	1:53
4.	"1977" (first ever recording session at Beaconsfield Film School 1976 produced by Julien Temple (Previously Unreleased))	Joe Strummer	1:50
5.	"Janie Jones" (second ever recording session November 1976, Polydor demos produced by Guy Stevens)	Joe Strummer	2:05
6.	"Career Opportunities" (second ever recording session November 1976, Polydor demos produced by Guy Stevens)	Joe Strummer	1:53
7.	"London's Burning" (second ever recording session November 1976, Polydor demos produced by Guy Stevens (Previously Unreleased))	Joe Strummer	1:58
8.	"1977" (second ever recording session November 1976, Polydor demos produced by Guy Stevens (Previously Unreleased))	Joe Strummer	1:40
9.	"White Riot" (second ever recording session November 1976, Polydor demos produced by Guy Stevens (Previously Unreleased))	Joe Strummer	1:58
10.	"City of the Dead" (Live at The Lyceum, London 28 December 1978)	Joe Strummer	2:55
11.	"Jail Guitar Doors" (Live at The Lyceum, London 28 December 1978 (Previously Unreleased))	Mick Jones	3:02
12.	"English Civil War" (Live at The Lyceum, London 28 December 1978)	Joe Strummer	2:31
13.	"Stay Free" (Live at The Lyceum, London 28 December 1978 (Previously Unreleased))	Mick Jones	3:27
14.	"Cheapskates" (Live at The Lyceum, London 28 December 1978 (Previously Unreleased))	Joe Strummer	3:12
15.	"I Fought the Law" (Live at The Lyceum, London 28 December 1978)	Joe Strummer	2:25

Tracks 10–15 from Sound System extras disc 3 are incorrectly credited as dating from December 1979.

All tracks are written by Joe Strummer and Mick Jones, except where noted.

Live at Shea Stadium (iTunes Store only)
No.	Title	Length
1.	"Kosmo Vinyl Introduction" (Concert introduction)	1:10
2.	"London Calling"	3:29
3.	"Police on My Back" (written by Eddy Grant; originally performed by The Equals)	3:28
4.	"The Guns of Brixton" (written by Paul Simonon)	4:06
5.	"Tommy Gun"	3:19
6.	"The Magnificent Seven" (written by The Clash)	2:33
7.	"Armagideon Time" (written by Willi Williams and Jackie Mittoo; originally performed by Willi Williams)	2:55
8.	"The Magnificent Seven (Return)" (written by The Clash)	2:23
9.	"Rock the Casbah" (written by The Clash)	3:21
10.	"Train in Vain"	3:45
11.	"Career Opportunities"	2:05
12.	"Spanish Bombs"	3:18
13.	"Clampdown"	4:26
14.	"English Civil War" (Traditional; arranged by Strummer and Jones)	2:39
15.	"Should I Stay or Should I Go" (written by The Clash)	2:44
16.	"I Fought the Law" (written by Sonny Curtis)	3:22

All tracks are written by Joe Strummer and Mick Jones, except where noted.

From Here to Eternity: Live (iTunes Store only)
No.	Title	Recorded	Length
1.	"Complete Control"	13 June 1981 at Bonds International Casino in New York City	3:45
2.	"London's Burning"	30 April 1978 at Victoria Park, East London	2:03
3.	"What's My Name" (written by Strummer, Jones, Keith Levene)	27 July 1978 at Music Machine in London	1:43
4.	"Clash City Rockers"	7 September 1982 at The Orpheum in Boston	3:30
5.	"Career Opportunities"	13 October 1982 at Shea Stadium in New York City	2:06
6.	"(White Man) In Hammersmith Palais"	7 September 1982 at The Orpheum in Boston	4:28
7.	"Capital Radio"	18 February 1980 at the Lewisham Odeon in London	2:58
8.	"City of the Dead"	28 December 1978 at the Lyceum Theatre, London	2:47
9.	"I Fought the Law" (written by Sonny Curtis)	28 December 1978 at the Lyceum Theatre, London	2:36
10.	"London Calling"	7 September 1982 at The Orpheum in Boston	3:29
11.	"Armagideon Time" (written by Willie Williams and Jackie Mittoo)	18 February 1980 at the Lewisham Odeon in London	5:05
12.	"Train in Vain"	13 June 1981 at Bonds International Casino in New York City	4:43
13.	"The Guns of Brixton" (written by Paul Simonon)	13 June 1981 at Bonds International Casino in New York City	3:36
14.	"The Magnificent Seven" (written by The Clash)	7 September 1982 at The Orpheum in Boston	6:09
15.	"Know Your Rights" (written by The Clash)	7 September 1982 at The Orpheum in Boston	4:04
16.	"Should I Stay or Should I Go" (written by The Clash)	8 September 1982 at The Orpheum in Boston	3:14
17.	"Straight to Hell" (written by The Clash)	8 September 1982 at The Orpheum in Boston	7:08
18.	"Drug-Stabbing Time" (bonus track)	28 December 1978 at the Lyceum Theatre, London	3:33
19.	"Janie Jones" (bonus track)	8 September 1982 at The Orpheum in Boston	2:46

== Bonus DVD ==
Julien Temple Archive – 6:15

White Riot Promo Film (Promo and interview with Tony Parsons) – 7:11

- 1977
- White Riot
- London's Burning

Sussex University '77 – 8:29 (previously unreleased)

- I'm So Bored with the USA
- Hate & War
- Career Opportunities
- Remote Control

Don Letts Super 8 Medley – 11:45

- White Riot
- Janie Jones
- City of the Dead
- Clash City Rockers
- White Man in Hammersmith Palais
- 1977

Clash on Broadway – 22:31

- London Calling
- This Is Radio Clash
- The Magnificent Seven
- The Guns of Brixton
- Safe European Home

Promo Videos – 37:37

- Tommy Gun
- London Calling
- Bankrobber
- Clampdown (Live)
- Train in Vain (Live)
- The Call Up
- Rock the Casbah
- Radio Clash
- Should I Stay or Should I Go (Live at Shea Stadium)
- Career Opportunities (Live at Shea Stadium)

== Personnel ==
The Clash

- Joe Strummer − backing vocals, bass guitar, lead guitar, lead vocals, piano, rhythm guitar, vocals
- Mick Jones − backing vocals, harmonica, lead guitar, lead vocals, piano, vocals
- Paul Simonon − backing vocals, bass guitar, lead vocals, rhythm guitar, vocals
- Topper Headon − bass guitar, drums, percussion, piano, vocals
- Tory Crimes (Terry Chimes) − drums

Featured artists

- Mikey Dread – backing vocals, lead vocals, vocals
- Tymon Dogg – piano, vocals, violin
- Ellen Foley – backing vocals, lead vocals, vocals
- Futura 2000 – vocals
- Luke & Ben Gallagher – vocals
- Maria Gallagher – vocals
- Allen Ginsberg – vocals
- Den Hegarty (Darts) – vocals
- Joe Ely – backing vocals
- Kosmo Vinyl – vocals
- Ivan Julian – guitar
- Noel "Tempo" Bailey (aka Sowell) – guitar
- Allen Lanier – piano
- Mickey Gallagher – keyboards, Organ, piano
- Poly Mandell (Tommy Mandel) – keyboards
- Norman Watt-Roy – bass
- The Irish Horns – brass
- Gary Barnacle – saxophone
- Davey Payne – saxophone
- Arthur Edward "Bill" Barnacle – trumpet
- Lew Lewis – harmonica
- Band Sgt. Dave Yates
- Battersea
- Gerald Baxter-Warman
- Tim Curry
- Ray Gasconne
- Rudolph Adolphus Jordan
- Terry McQuade
- Anthony Nelson Steelie
- Jody Winscott
- Composers: Mose Allison, Clive Alphonso, Michael Campbell, The Clash, Sonny Curtis, Clement Dodd, Tymon Dogg, Mikey Dread, Jackie Edwards, Robert Ellen, Eddy Grant, Topper Headon, Frederick Hibbert, FBooker T. Jones, Mick Jones, Keith Levine, Jackie Mittoo, Junior Murvin, Lee "Scratch" Perry, Danny Ray, Paul Simonon, Joe Strummer, Vince Taylor, Wilbert Williams

Production

- Engineering: Joe Blaney, Gregg Caruso, Kevin Dalimore, Dennis Ferranti, Eddie Garcia, Jerry Green, Simon Humphreys, Glyn Johns, Lancelot "Maxie" McKenzie, Chris Mingo, J.P. Nickolson, Bill Price, Corky Stasiak, Paul Subblebine, and Julien Temple
- Editing: Robin Banks, Pablo D'Ambrosie, and Kris Needs
- Mixing: Mikey Dread, Glyn Johns, Bill Price, Corky Stasiak, and Richard Whittaker
- Remastering: The Clash, Mick Jones, Paul Stubblebine, and Tim Young
- Sound Effects: Steve Bell
- Art Editor: Robert Gordon McHarg III
- Artwork: Mikey Dread, Eddie, Gene Greif, Jules, Robert Gordon McHarg III, Chris Musto, Kate Simon, Paul Simonon, and Joe Strummer
- Design: Hugh Brown, The Clash, Wes Geral, Gene Greif, Jules, Ray Lowry, Robert Gordon McHarg III, Robbin Panks, Terry Razor, and Paul Simonon
- Liner Notes: The Baker, Robin Banks, John Cooper Clarke, Mikey Dread, Johnny Green, Topper Headon, Mick Jones, Ray Jordan, Don Letts, Alex Michon, Bill Price, Chris Salewicz, Paul Simonon, Pennie Smith, Joe Strummer, Julien Temple, Tim Young, and Kosmo Vinyl
- Photography: M. Arscott, Jane Ashley, Hugh Brown, Caroline Coon, Bob Gruen, Sho Kikuchi, Krystyna Kolowska, Grzegorz Lepiarz, Des Letts, Rocco Macauley, Kate Simon, Paul Slattery, Pennie Smith, Joe Strummer, Julien Temple, and Julian Yewdall
- Cartoonist: Steve Bell
- Layout: Chris Musto
- Executive Producer: Don Letts
- Producers: Ama Chana, The Clash, Micky Foote, Sandy Pearlman, and Guy Stevens
- Project Manager: Joanna Kalli
- Project Consultant: Andy Street
- Consultant: Bill Price
- Assistants: Steve Levine, Joe Pullen
- A&R: Bruce Dickinson and Matt Gibbon

== Charts ==
Chart performance for Sound System
Chart (2013)	Peak position
Belgian Albums (Ultratop Wallonia)	99
Scottish Albums (Official Charts)	56
UK Albums (Official Charts)	53
