= Super Black Market Clash =

1993 compilation album by The Clash

Super Black Market Clash is a 1993 compilation album released by the English punk rock band the Clash. It contains B-sides and rare tracks not available on the group's regular studio albums. The album is an expanded repackaging of the 1980 release Black Market Clash, a 10-inch EP containing nine songs. The man in the foreground of the front cover art on both releases is Don Letts, who worked with the Clash on several projects and later was a founding member of Big Audio Dynamite.

== Black Market Clash ==
Black Market Clash

EP by The Clash
- Released: October 1980
- Recorded: 1977–1980
- Genres: Punk rock, reggae, dub
- Length: 34:37
- Label: Epic
- Producers: Pepe Unidos, Sandy Pearlman, Mickey Foote, The Clash

The Clash compilation and live album chronology
Black Market Clash (1980)	The Story of the Clash, Volume 1 (1988)

The Clash EPs chronology
The Cost of Living (1979)	Black Market Clash (1980)

Professional ratings
Review scores
Source	Rating
AllMusic	link
Robert Christgau	A−

Black Market Clash was released in October 1980, only in the US and Canada, in between London Calling and Sandinista!. It compiled recordings which were then unavailable in the US except as imports. The disc was one in the series of "Nu-Disk" 10-inch records from Epic. Other artists in the series included New Musik and Cheap Trick.

"The Prisoner", the cover of "Pressure Drop" by Toots and the Maytals, "City of the Dead", and "Armagideon Time" had all been UK B-sides from the period 1977–79, respectively of "White Man in Hammersmith Palais", "English Civil War", "Complete Control", and "London Calling". "Pressure Drop" is presented here in a remix by Bill Price.

At the time of release, this was the only Clash record that featured the cover of the "Time Is Tight" instrumental, originally by Booker T & the MGs. "Capital Radio" was extremely rare in the UK. Rather than re-issue the original, the group recorded a new version for The Cost of Living as "Capital Radio Two". "Cheat" is from their UK debut album but had been left off the US version.

"Bankrobber" had previously only been a 1980 UK 7" A-side. "Robber Dub" was originally intended for the B-side of an unreleased "Bankrobber" 12" dance club single. The two tracks appear here in a combined edit that is unique to Black Market Clash. "Justice Tonight/Kick It Over", the dub version of "Armagideon Time", is the last track. This was previously available as the B-side to the 12-inch "London Calling" club single. The full length version of "Justice Tonight/Kick It Over" is 8:54 and the 7:00 edited version is also unique to Black Market Clash.

Black Market Clash was reissued in the 1980s on 12-inch vinyl and cassette, with the same track listing as the 10-inch. It was re-released on compact disc in 1991, but discontinued when Super Black Market Clash replaced it. It was available again for a short period of time in 2006 in a few countries. It was reissued on 10-inch vinyl again in 2011.

Black Market Clash was issued in Japan in 1992, with liner notes in Japanese.

=== Track listing ===
All songs written by Joe Strummer and Mick Jones, except where noted.

Side one

1. "Capital Radio One" – 2:09
2. "The Prisoner" – 3:00
3. "Pressure Drop" (Toots Hibbert) – 3:30
4. "Cheat" – 2:06
5. "The City of the Dead" – 2:26
6. "Time Is Tight" (Booker T. Jones, Steve Cropper, Donald "Duck" Dunn, Al Jackson) – 4:05

Side two

1. "Bankrobber/Robber Dub" (Strummer, Jones, Mikey Dread) – 6:16
2. "Armagideon Time" (Willie Williams, Jackie Mittoo) – 3:50
3. "Justice Tonight/Kick It Over" (edit) (Williams, Mittoo) – 7:00

=== Personnel ===
- Joe Strummer – lead vocals, guitars, piano, organ
- Mick Jones – guitars, vocals, piano, harmonica, sound effects
- Paul Simonon – bass guitar, vocals
- Terry Chimes – drums on "Capital Radio" and "Cheat"
- Topper Headon – drums and percussion on "The Prisoner", "Pressure Drop", "The City of the Dead", "Time Is Tight", "Bankrobber"/"Robber Dub", "Armagideon Time", and "Justice Tonight"/"Kick It Over"

Additional musicians

- Mick Gallagher – ARP synthesizer and piano on "Bankrobber", organ on "Armagideon Time"
- Gary Barnacle – saxophone on "Time Is Tight" and "The City of the Dead"

=== Charts ===
Chart performance for Super Black Market Clash
Chart (1980–1981)	Peak position
New Zealand Albums (RMNZ)	15
US Billboard 200	74

== Super Black Market Clash ==
Super Black Market Clash

Compilation album by The Clash
- Released: 26 October 1993
- Recorded: February 1977 – May 1982
- Genre: Punk rock
- Length: 77:13
- Label: Epic
- Producers: Kosmo Vinyl, Pepe Unidos, The Clash

The Clash compilations and lives chronology
The Singles (1991)	Super Black Market Clash (1993)	From Here to Eternity: Live (1999)

Professional ratings
Review scores
Source	Rating
AllMusic	link
Blender	link
Punknews.org	link

Super Black Market Clash is a compilation album released by the Clash in 1993, containing B-sides and rare tracks not available on their studio albums. It is an expanded repackaging of the 1980 Black Market Clash EP, a single 10" record with nine songs. The cover art follows the design of the original but is rendered in different colors.

Super Black Market Clash was released on CD and in a 3x10" vinyl edition, but does not contain the tracks "Capital Radio One", "Cheat", "Bankrobber/Robber Dub" or "Armagideon Time" found on the original EP. At the time of re-release, "Capital Radio One", "Bankrobber" and "Armagideon Time" had recently been included on the compilations The Story of the Clash, Volume 1 and Clash on Broadway, so omitting the tracks did not affect their availability. The extended release also replaces the version of "Pressure Drop" that appeared on Black Market Clash with the B-side mix, and "Justice Tonight/Kick It Over" is a longer version than the track on Black Market Clash.

With 21 tracks, Super Black Market Clash does not fully compile the Clash's B-sides and rarities. It does however contain important songs, such as three from The Cost of Living EP and several B-sides previously unavailable on CD including "The Cool Out" (a remix of "The Call Up") and "Long Time Jerk" (although in a shorter version than appeared as the B-side to "Rock the Casbah").

The artwork for the remaster corrects an error in the track listing on the original ("Pressure Drop" was listed as track 5 and "The Prisoner" as track 6 when they actually play in the opposite sequence). The original version of the revised artwork also introduced a new error by listing "Radio Clash" as "This Is Radio Clash" (the former song, which appears on the album, is the B-side to the latter song which does not), corrected on later pressings.

The Clash's entire catalogue, including this album, was remastered and re-released in January 2000.

=== Track listing ===
Super Black Market Clash
No.	Title	Writer(s)	Source	Length
1.	"1977"	Joe Strummer, Mick Jones	B-side of "White Riot" single, 1977	1:41
2.	"Listen"	Strummer, Jones	excerpt released on Capital Radio One, 1977; full version exclusive to this collection	2:44
3.	"Jail Guitar Doors"	Strummer, Jones	B-side of "Clash City Rockers" single, 1978	3:05
4.	"City of the Dead"	Strummer, Jones	B-side of "Complete Control" single, 1977	2:24
5.	"The Prisoner"	Strummer, Jones	B-side of "(White Man) In Hammersmith Palais" single, 1978	3:01
6.	"Pressure Drop"	Toots Hibbert	B-side of "English Civil War" single, 1979	3:26
7.	"1–2 Crush on You"	Strummer, Jones	B-side of "Tommy Gun" single, 1978	2:58
8.	"Groovy Times"	Strummer, Jones	The Cost of Living E.P., 1979	3:31
9.	"Gates of the West"	Strummer, Jones	The Cost of Living E.P., 1979	3:27
10.	"Capital Radio Two"	Strummer, Jones	The Cost of Living E.P., 1979	3:21
11.	"Time Is Tight"	Booker T. Jones, Steve Cropper, Donald "Duck" Dunn, Al Jackson	Black Market Clash, 1980	4:06
12.	"Justice Tonight / Kick It Over" (dub version of "Armagideon Time")	Willi Williams, Jackie Mittoo	B-side of "London Calling" 12" single, 1979	8:54
13.	"Robber Dub" (dub version of "Bankrobber")	Strummer, Jones, Mikey Dread	Black Market Clash, 1980	4:42
14.	"The Cool Out" (instrumental version of "The Call Up")	The Clash (Jones, Strummer, Paul Simonon, Topper Headon)	B-side of "The Magnificent Seven" single, 1981	3:54
15.	"Stop the World"	The Clash	B-side of "The Call Up" single, 1980	2:32
16.	"The Magnificent Dance"	The Clash	B-side of "The Magnificent Seven" single, 1981	5:38
17.	"Radio Clash" (incorrectly listed as "This Is Radio Clash")	The Clash	B-side of "This Is Radio Clash" single, 1981	4:10
18.	"First Night Back in London"	The Clash	B-side of "Know Your Rights" single, 1982	3:00
19.	"Long Time Jerk" (edit, not noted as such on release)	The Clash	Edited version of B-side of "Rock the Casbah" single, 1982; full length recording is 5:10	2:57
20.	"Cool Confusion"	The Clash	B-side of "Should I Stay or Should I Go" single, 1982	3:15
21.	"Mustapha Dance" (dub version of "Rock the Casbah")	The Clash	B-side of "Rock the Casbah" single, 1982	4:26

=== Personnel ===
- Joe Strummer – lead vocals, rhythm guitar, piano
- Mick Jones – lead guitar, vocals, piano
- Paul Simonon – bass, vocals
- Terry Chimes – drums on "1977" and "Listen"
- Topper Headon – drums, percussion on all other tracks

Additional musicians

- Gary Barnacle – saxophone on "1–2 Crush on You" and "Time Is Tight"
