= Clash on Broadway =

Box set by The Clash
- Released: 19 November 1991
- Recorded: 1977–1982
- Genre: Punk rock
- Length: 215:22
- Label: CBS/Epic
- Producers: The Clash; Mickey Foote; Mikey Dread; Sandy Pearlman; Bill Price; Guy Stevens; Lee Perry

The Clash compilations and lives chronology
| 1977 Revisited (1990) | Clash on Broadway (1991) | The Singles (1991) |

Professional ratings
Review scores
| Source | Rating |
|---|---|
| AllMusic | 4.5/5 stars |
| Entertainment Weekly | A− |
| Melody Maker | 5/5 stars |
| Q | 5/5 stars |

Clash on Broadway is a box set compilation album by the English punk rock band the Clash, released on Legacy Records in 1991. It comprises 64 tracks on three compact discs, spanning the time period from their 1977 debut single, "White Riot", through the Combat Rock album of 1982. It does not include material from the band's final sessions led by Joe Strummer and Paul Simonon, resulting in the final album Cut the Crap (1985). It was initially released in longbox form.

== Content ==
The set contains five previously unreleased tracks, two early demo recordings, and three live recordings, one of which had been released on a film soundtrack. Thirteen of the eighteen singles released during the time frame covered appear, leaving out "Remote Control", released as a single against the band's wishes, "English Civil War" and "I Fought the Law", both of which appear via live versions, as well as "Hitsville UK" and "Know Your Rights".

Disc one contains mostly recordings taken from the band's early singles, including the extended play single Capital Radio (1977), and their 1977 debut album. The four songs deleted from the British version of The Clash album and replaced by singles tracks for the American version—"Deny", "Protex Blue", "Cheat" and "48 Hours"—are included. Disc two focuses on tracks from the albums Give 'Em Enough Rope (1978) and London Calling (1979), and the extended play single The Cost of Living (1979). Disc three contains tracks from Sandinista! (1980) and Combat Rock (1982), with tracks from the latter including both edited and unedited versions.

== Track listing ==
All tracks are written by Mick Jones and Joe Strummer, except where noted.

Disc one
| No. | Title | Writer(s) | Origin | Length |
|---|---|---|---|---|
| 1. | "Janie Jones" (early demo produced by Guy Stevens) | | previously unreleased | 2:11 |
| 2. | "Career Opportunities" (early demo produced by Guy Stevens) | | previously unreleased | 1:58 |
| 3. | "White Riot" | | A-side of first single (1977) | 1:59 |
| 4. | "1977" | | B-side of first single (1977) | 1:41 |
| 5. | "I'm So Bored with the USA" | | The Clash (1977) | 2:25 |
| 6. | "Hate and War" | | The Clash | 2:06 |
| 7. | "What's My Name" | Jones, Strummer, Keith Levene | The Clash | 1:40 |
| 8. | "Deny" | | UK version of The Clash (1977) | 3:05 |
| 9. | "London's Burning" | | The Clash | 2:10 |
| 10. | "Protex Blue" | | UK version of The Clash | 1:46 |
| 11. | "Police and Thieves" | Junior Murvin, Lee "Scratch" Perry | The Clash | 6:00 |
| 12. | "48 Hours" | | UK version of The Clash | 1:36 |
| 13. | "Cheat" | | UK version of The Clash | 2:07 |
| 14. | "Garageland" | | The Clash | 3:14 |
| 15. | "Capital Radio One" | | Capital Radio EP (1977) | 2:09 |
| 16. | "Complete Control" | | US version of The Clash (1979) | 3:14 |
| 17. | "Clash City Rockers" | | US version of The Clash | 3:49 |
| 18. | "City of the Dead" | | B-side of the "Complete Control" single (1977) | 2:24 |
| 19. | "Jail Guitar Doors" | | US version of The Clash | 3:05 |
| 20. | "The Prisoner" | | B-side of the "(White Man) In Hammersmith Palais" single (1978) | 3:00 |
| 21. | "(White Man) In Hammersmith Palais" | | US version of The Clash | 4:01 |
| 22. | "Pressure Drop" | Toots Hibbert | B-side of the "English Civil War" single (1979) | 3:26 |
| 23. | "1-2 Crush on You" | | B-side of the "Tommy Gun" single (1978) | 3:01 |
| 24. | "English Civil War" (live recording from the Lyceum Theatre, London, 1979) | traditional, arranged Strummer/Jones | previously unreleased | 2:41 |
| 25. | "I Fought the Law" (live) | Sonny Curtis | Rude Boy soundtrack (1979) | 2:26 |

Disc two
| No. | Title | Writer(s) | Origin | Length |
|---|---|---|---|---|
| 1. | "Safe European Home" | | Give 'Em Enough Rope (1978) | 3:51 |
| 2. | "Tommy Gun" | | Give 'Em Enough Rope | 3:17 |
| 3. | "Julie's Been Working for the Drug Squad" | | Give 'Em Enough Rope | 3:04 |
| 4. | "Stay Free" | | Give 'Em Enough Rope | 3:40 |
| 5. | "One Emotion" | | previously unreleased; Give 'Em Enough Rope sessions | 4:40 |
| 6. | "Groovy Times" | | Cost of Living EP (1978) | 3:30 |
| 7. | "Gates of the West" | | Cost of Living EP | 3:27 |
| 8. | "Armagideon Time" | Willie Williams, Jackie Mittoo | B-side of the "London Calling" single (1979) | 3:50 |
| 9. | "London Calling" | | London Calling (1979) | 3:20 |
| 10. | "Brand New Cadillac" | Vince Taylor | London Calling | 2:10 |
| 11. | "Rudie Can't Fail" | | London Calling | 3:30 |
| 12. | "The Guns of Brixton" | Paul Simonon | London Calling | 3:11 |
| 13. | "Spanish Bombs" | | London Calling | 3:20 |
| 14. | "Lost in the Supermarket" | | London Calling | 3:48 |
| 15. | "The Right Profile" | | London Calling | 3:55 |
| 16. | "The Card Cheat" | The Clash | London Calling | 3:51 |
| 17. | "Death or Glory" | | London Calling | 3:57 |
| 18. | "Clampdown" | | London Calling | 3:50 |
| 19. | "Train in Vain" | | London Calling | 3:11 |
| 20. | "Bankrobber" | | A-side of UK single (1980) | 4:33 |

Disc three
| No. | Title | Writer(s) | Origin | Length |
|---|---|---|---|---|
| 1. | "Police on My Back" | Eddy Grant | Sandinista! (1980) | 3:18 |
| 2. | "The Magnificent Seven" | The Clash | Sandinista! | 5:33 |
| 3. | "The Leader" | The Clash | Sandinista! | 1:42 |
| 4. | "The Call Up" | The Clash | Sandinista! | 5:28 |
| 5. | "Somebody Got Murdered" | The Clash | Sandinista! | 3:35 |
| 6. | "Washington Bullets" | The Clash | Sandinista! | 3:52 |
| 7. | "Broadway" | The Clash | Sandinista! | 4:57 |
| 8. | "Lightning Strikes (Not Once But Twice)" (live recording from Bonds International Casino, New York City, 1981) | The Clash | previously unreleased | 3:38 |
| 9. | "Every Little Bit Hurts" | Ed Cobb | previously unreleased; Sandinista! sessions | 4:38 |
| 10. | "Stop the World" | The Clash | B-side of "The Call Up" single (1980) | 2:33 |
| 11. | "Midnight to Stevens" (recorded at People's Hall, Frestonia, London in 1981) | The Clash | previously unreleased | 4:39 |
| 12. | "This Is Radio Clash" | The Clash | A-side of the "This is Radio Clash" single (1981) | 4:11 |
| 13. | "Cool Confusion" | The Clash | B-side of the "Should I Stay or Should I Go" single (1982) | 3:15 |
| 14. | "Red Angel Dragnet" (edited version) | The Clash | Combat Rock (1982) | 3:25 |
| 15. | "Ghetto Defendant" (edited version) | The Clash | Combat Rock | 4:15 |
| 16. | "Rock the Casbah" (US single version) | The Clash | Combat Rock | 3:42 |
| 17. | "Should I Stay or Should I Go" (US single version) | The Clash | Combat Rock | 3:09 |
| 18. | "Straight to Hell" (unedited version) | The Clash | Combat Rock | 6:56 |
| 19. | "The Street Parade" (hidden track) | The Clash | Sandinista! | 3:27 |

== Personnel ==
The Clash

- Mick Jones – vocals, guitars, keyboards
- Joe Strummer – vocals, guitars, keyboards
- Paul Simonon – bass guitar, vocals
- Terry Chimes – drums (on disc one, tracks 1–15)
- Topper Headon – drums, piano, bass, vocals (on disc one, tracks 16–25, and discs two and three)

Technical

- Richard Bauer – compilation producer
- Don DeVito – compilation producer
- Kosmo Vinyl – project director, liner notes
- Ray Staff – remastering
- Bob Whitney – remastering
- Bill Price – remastering supervisor
- Hugh Attwool – tape research
- Bruce Dickinson – tape research
- Josh Cheuse – art direction, cover design
- Lester Bangs – liner notes
- Mickey Gallagher – liner notes
- Lenny Kaye – liner notes
- Keith Levene – liner notes
- Bernard Rhodes – liner notes

== Certifications ==
| Region | Certification | Certified units/sales |
|---|---|---|
| United Kingdom (BPI) | Silver | 60,000^{‡} |
^{‡} Sales+streaming figures based on certification alone.
