= This Is Radio Clash =

Single by the Clash
- B-side: "Radio Clash"
- Released: 20 November 1981 (U.K.)
- Recorded: 1981
- Genre: Rap rock; funk
- Length: 4:10
- Label: CBS
- Songwriters: Joe Strummer; Mick Jones; Paul Simonon; Topper Headon
- Producer: The Clash

The Clash singles chronology
"The Magnificent Seven" (1981)	"This Is Radio Clash" / "Radio Clash" (1981)	"Know Your Rights" (1982)

Music video
- "This Is Radio Clash" on YouTube

"This Is Radio Clash" is a song by the English rock band the Clash, released as a single in 1981. It received mixed reviews from critics who wanted the Clash to return to their anarchic punk roots. The experimental nature of the song drew praise, as well as the Clash's signature anti-authoritarian political lyrics. The song continued the Clash's shift to rap rock and funk, a combination which had succeeded in the American market.

== Release ==
=== 7-inch single ===
The 7-inch single also contains a B-side titled simply "Radio Clash", which is a remix of the title track with additional lyrics. The Clash stated at the time that they intended the songs to be heard as a single entity. The two recordings have the same playing time.

"This Is Radio Clash" begins with the lyric:

"This is Radio Clash on pirate satellite
Orbiting your living room, cashing in the bill of rights."

"Radio Clash" begins with:

"This is Radio Clash resuming all transmissions
Beaming from the mountain tops, using aural ammunition."

On some versions of the Super Black Market Clash CD, the B-side "Radio Clash" is included, but incorrectly listed as "This Is Radio Clash". The same error was repeated on the US version of the 2003 collection The Essential Clash.

=== 12-inch single ===
On side one of the 12-inch single, "This Is Radio Clash" is followed by "Radio Clash". Side two contains two additional remixes of the title track: "Outside Broadcast" and "Radio Five". In 2006, a CD compilation called Singles Box was released which collected all four versions in the same order with original cover art.

== Legacy ==
American critic Eric Schafer described the song as "a magnificent, daring, challenging record that was years ahead of its time; one of the great rock records of the 1980s, it has never been given its just credit. Twenty-eight years after its debut, were it released today it would still burn up the radio."

The song is not featured on any of the Clash's original studio albums, but is included on their compilations The Story of the Clash, Volume 1 (1988), Clash on Broadway (1991), The Singles (1991), Sound System (2013), Singles Box (2006) and The Singles (2007). The song is included on the experimental compilation album called Disco Not Disco 2 (2002), as well as the radio soundtrack in the video game Battlefield Hardline (2015). The song was also briefly featured in season 2, episode 4 of Stranger Things.

== Track listing ==
All tracks written and composed by The Clash (Joe Strummer, Mick Jones, Paul Simonon, Topper Headon).

7" vinyl

1. "This Is Radio Clash" – 4:12
2. "Radio Clash" – 4:12

12" vinyl / Cassette

1. "This Is Radio Clash" – 4:12
2. "Radio Clash" – 4:12
3. "Outside Broadcast" – 7:23
4. "Radio 5" – 3:38

== Personnel ==
The Clash

- Joe Strummer – vocal, rhythm guitar
- Mick Jones – vocal, lead guitar
- Paul Simonon – bass guitar
- Topper Headon – drums

Additional musician

- Gary Barnacle – saxophones

== Charts ==
Year	Chart	Peak position
1981	UK Singles Chart	47
1982	Australia (ARIA)	40
1982	New Zealand (Recorded Music NZ)	28
1982	Sweden (Sverigetopplistan)	9
1982	US Billboard Club Play Singles	17
1982	US Mainstream Rock	45
