= The Call Up (song) =

Single by the Clash

from the album Sandinista!
- B-side: "Stop the World"
- Released: 28 November 1980
- Recorded: 1980
- Studio: Electric Lady (New York City)
- Genre: Post-punk
- Length: 5:28
- Label: CBS S CBS 9339
- Songwriter: The Clash

The Clash singles chronology
"Bankrobber" (1980)	"The Call Up" (1980)	"Hitsville U.K." (1981)

"The Call Up" is a song by the English rock band the Clash. It was released as the first single from the band's fourth studio album, Sandinista!. The single was released in November 1980, in advance of the release of Sandinista!, with "Stop the World" as its B-side.

== Re-releases ==
The single was reissued in 1981 in the US by Epic Records (catalog number 02036) in 7" vinyl format and with a different cover. On the B-side of the US release was "The Cool Out", a dub of "The Call Up".

In addition to its inclusion on Sandinista!, "The Call Up" has been included on both The Clash on Broadway and The Singles. It is absent from The Essential Clash, although "Stop The World", its B-side that was not included on Sandinista, is included. "Stop The World" is also included on The Clash on Broadway and the B-side compilation Super Black Market Clash.

The single was reissued on CD as Disc 12 of Singles Box, complete with a re-creation of the original sleeve artwork, but omits "The Cool Out", making it the only disc in the set that does not include all non-UK released tracks. "The Cool Out" is however included on Disc 14 as part of the "Magnificent Seven" release.

== Track listing ==
All tracks written by The Clash; except where indicated.

7" vinyl

1. "The Call Up" – 5:26
2. "Stop the World" – 2:32

12" vinyl (US)

1. "The Call Up" – 4:50
2. "The Cool Out" – 2:57
3. "The Magnificent Dance" (Mick Jones/Joe Strummer/Topper Headon/Norman Watt-Roy/Mickey Gallagher) – 5:36
4. "The Magnificent Seven" (Mick Jones/Joe Strummer/Topper Headon/Norman Watt-Roy/Mickey Gallagher) – 2:16

== Personnel ==
=== "The Call Up" ===
- Joe Strummer – lead guitar, lead vocals
- Mick Jones – lead guitars, backing vocals, sound effects
- Norman Watt-Roy – bass guitar, backing vocals
- Topper Headon – drums, backing vocals

=== "Stop the World" ===
- Joe Strummer – vocal
- Mick Jones – guitars, sound effects
- Norman Watt-Roy – bass guitar
- Topper Headon – drums

== Covers ==
The song was covered by Chris Whitley, using only voice and acoustic guitar, as track four on his 2004 release "War Crime Blues". It was also covered by The Lothars as track four, disc two of a compilation tribute album The Sandinista! Project.

== Charts ==
Year	Chart	Peak position
1980	Australia (ARIA)	69
1980	New Zealand (Recorded Music NZ)	42
1980	Sweden (Sverigetopplistan)	13
1980	UK Singles (Official Charts)	40
