= Combat Rock =

Studio album by the Clash
- Released: 14 May 1982
- Recorded: 1980; September 1981; November 1981 – January 1982; April 1982
- Studios: Ear (London); Electric Lady (New York); Warnham (West Sussex, England)
- Genres: Post-punk; reggae; funk; new wave
- Length: 46:21
- Labels: CBS; Epic
- Producers: The Clash; Glyn Johns

The Clash chronology
Sandinista! (1980)	Combat Rock (1982)	Cut the Crap (1985)

Singles from Combat Rock
- 1. "Know Your Rights" Released: 23 April 1982; 2. "Rock the Casbah" Released: 11 June 1982; 3. "Should I Stay or Should I Go / Straight to Hell" Released: 17 September 1982

Combat Rock is the fifth studio album by the English rock band the Clash, released on 14 May 1982 through CBS Records. In the United Kingdom, the album charted at number 2, spending 23 weeks in the UK charts and peaked at number 7 in the United States, spending 61 weeks on the chart. The album was propelled by drummer Topper Headon's "Rock the Casbah" which became a staple on the newly launched MTV. Combat Rock continued the influence of funk and reggae like previous Clash albums, but also featured a more radio-friendly sound which alienated Clash fans.

While the recording process went smoothly, the producing process of the album was tiring and full of infighting between Mick Jones and Joe Strummer. Headon's heroin addiction grew worse and he slowly became distant from the band while Strummer and bassist Paul Simonon reinstated Bernie Rhodes as manager, a move not welcomed by Jones. The band had disagreed on the creative process of the album and called in Glyn Johns to produce the more radio-friendly sound of Combat Rock. Lyrically, Combat Rock focuses on the Vietnam War, postcolonialism, the decline of American society, and authoritarianism.

Combat Rock is the group's best-selling album, being certified double platinum in the United States and reaching number 2 in the UK. Reception to the album believed the band had reached its peak maturity with Combat Rock, as the album's sound was less anarchic but still as political as previous albums. It contains two of the Clash's signature songs, the singles "Rock the Casbah" and "Should I Stay or Should I Go". "Rock the Casbah" became highly successful in the United States and proved to be the band's anticipated US breakthrough.

Combat Rock is the last Clash album featuring the band's classic lineup. Topper Headon was fired (due to his heroin addiction) days before the release of Combat Rock (he was replaced by original Clash drummer Terry Chimes whom Headon replaced in 1977) and Mick Jones was fired after the end of the Combat Rock tour in 1983. Combat Rock would be succeeded by the Clash's last album, Cut the Crap, recorded and released without Mick Jones or Topper Headon in 1985.

== Background ==
Following the triple-album Sandinista! (1980), singer/guitarist Joe Strummer felt the group was "drifting" creatively. Bassist Paul Simonon agreed with Strummer's dissatisfaction towards the "boring" professionalism of the Clash's then-managers Blackhill Enterprises. Strummer and Simonon convinced their bandmates to reinstate the band's original manager Bernie Rhodes in February 1981, in an attempt to restore the "chaos" and "anarchic energy" of the Clash's early days. This decision was not welcomed by guitarist Mick Jones, who was becoming progressively estranged from his bandmates.

During this period, drummer Topper Headon escalated his intake of heroin and cocaine. His occasional drug usage had now become a habit that was costing him £100 per day and undermining his health. This drug addiction would be the factor that would later push his bandmates to fire him from the Clash, days before the release of Combat Rock.

== Production ==
=== Recording ===
The album had the working title Rat Patrol from Fort Bragg during the recording and mixing stages. After early recording sessions in London, the group relocated to New York for recording sessions at Electric Lady Studios in November and December 1981. Electric Lady was where the band had recorded its previous album Sandinista! in 1980.

While recording the album in New York, Mick Jones lived with his then-girlfriend Ellen Foley. Joe Strummer, Paul Simonon and Topper Headon stayed at the Iroquois Hotel on West 44th Street, a building famed for being the home of actor James Dean for two years during the early 1950s.

After finishing the New York recording sessions in December 1981, the band returned to London for most of January 1982. Between January and March, the Clash embarked on a six-week tour of Japan, Australia, New Zealand, Hong Kong and Thailand. During this tour, the album's cover photograph was shot by Pennie Smith in Thailand in March 1982.

=== Mixing and editing ===
Following the gruelling Far East tour, the Clash returned to London in March 1982 to listen to the music that they had recorded in New York three months earlier. They had recorded 18 songs, enough material to possibly release as a double-album. Having previously released the double-LP London Calling (1979) and the triple-LP Sandinista! (1980), the group considered whether they should again release a multi-LP collection.

The band debated how many songs their new album should contain, and how long the songs' mixes should be. Mick Jones argued in favour of a double-album with lengthier, dancier mixes. The other band members argued in favour of a single album with shorter song mixes. This internal wrangling created tension within the band, particularly with Jones, who had mixed the first version.

Manager Bernie Rhodes suggested that producer/engineer Glyn Johns be hired to remix the album. This editing took place in Johns' garden studio in Warnham, West Sussex (not at Wessex Studios, as is stated by some sources).

Johns, accompanied by Strummer and Jones edited Combat Rock down from a 77-minute double album down to a 46-minute single LP. This was achieved by trimming the length of individual songs, such as by removing instrumental intros and codas from songs like "Rock the Casbah" and "Overpowered by Funk". Additionally, the trio decided to omit several songs entirely, dropping the final track count to 12.

During these remixing sessions, Strummer and Jones also re-recorded their vocals for the songs "Should I Stay or Should I Go" and "Know Your Rights" and remixed the songs with the intent of maximising their impact as singles.

== Music and lyrics ==
The music on Combat Rock has been described as post-punk and new wave. A recurring motif of the album is the impact and aftermath of the Vietnam War. "Straight to Hell" describes the children fathered by American soldiers to Vietnamese mothers and then abandoned, while "Sean Flynn" describes the capture of photojournalist Sean Flynn, who was the son of actor Errol Flynn. Sean Flynn disappeared (and was presumably killed) in 1970 after being captured by the Vietcong in Cambodia.

Biographer Pat Gilbert describes many songs from Combat Rock as having a "trippy, foreboding feel", saturated in a "colonial melancholia and sadness" reflecting the Vietnam War. The band was inspired by Francis Ford Coppola's 1979 film about the Vietnam War, Apocalypse Now, and had previously released the song "Charlie Don't Surf" on Sandinista!, which referenced the film. Strummer later stated that he became "obsessed" with the film.

Other Combat Rock songs, if not directly about the Vietnam War and US foreign policy, depict American society in moral decline. "Inoculated City" satires the Nuremberg defense plea by soldiers on trial who've committed war crimes. The original version of this song included an unauthorized audio clip from a TV commercial for 2000 Flushes, a toilet bowl cleaner. The maker of this product threatened a lawsuit, forcing the group to edit the track, though the longer version was restored on later copies. "Red Angel Dragnet" was inspired by the January 1982 shooting death of Frank Melvin, a New York member of the Guardian Angels. The song quotes Martin Scorsese's 1976 movie Taxi Driver, with Clash associate Kosmo Vinyl recording several lines of dialogue imitating the voice of main character Travis Bickle. Bickle sports a mohawk in the latter part of Taxi Driver, a hairstyle adopted by Joe Strummer during the Combat Rock concert tour.

The song "Ghetto Defendant" features Beat poet Allen Ginsberg, who performed the song on stage with the band during the New York shows on their tour in support of the album. Ginsberg had researched punk music, and included phrases like "do the worm" and "slam dance" in his lyrics. At the end of the song he can be heard reciting the Heart Sutra, a popular Buddhist mantra.

The song "Know Your Rights" starts off with: "This is a public service announcement...with guitar!" The musical style of the song was described as being one of the "more punk" songs on the album, reflecting the open and clear lyrics of the song. The lyrics represent the fraudulent rights for the lower and less respected class, with a nefarious civil servant naming three rights, with each right having an exception to benefit the rich or being skewed against the lower class.

Music for "Rock the Casbah" was written by the band's drummer Topper Headon, based on a piano part that he had been toying with. Finding himself in the studio without his three bandmates, Headon progressively taped the drum, piano and bass parts, recording the bulk of the song's musical instrumentation himself. The other Clash members were impressed with Headon's recording, stating that they felt the musical track was essentially complete. However, Strummer was not satisfied with the page of suggested lyrics that Headon gave him. Before hearing Headon's music, Strummer had already come up with the phrases "rock the casbah" and "you'll have to let that raga drop" as lyrical ideas that he was considering for future songs. After hearing Headon's music, Strummer went into the studio's toilets and wrote lyrics to match the song's melody.

== Release ==
Following along the same note as Sandinista!, Combat Rock's catalogue number "FMLN2" is the abbreviation for the El Salvador political party Frente Farabundo Martí para la Liberación Nacional or FMLN.

Lead single "Know Your Rights" was released on 23 April 1982, and reached number 43 on the UK singles chart. Combat Rock was released on 14 May 1982 and reached number 2 on the UK album charts, kept off the top spot by Paul McCartney's Tug of War. In the United States, Combat Rock reached number 7 on the album charts, selling in excess of one million copies. Combat Rock was the band's most successful album in the United States. However, in the UK, Combat Rock was tied with the 1978 album Give 'Em Enough Rope for the band's highest charting album.

"Rock the Casbah", which was composed by drummer Topper Headon, reached number 8 on the US singles chart. The single was accompanied by a distinctive video directed by Don Letts that aired frequently on the then-fledgling television channel MTV. Headon, despite composing the song, was not in the music video after being replaced by Terry Chimes for his raging heroin addiction.

In January 2000, the album, along with the rest of the Clash's catalogue, was remastered and re-released. A fortieth anniversary reissue was released in May 2022 with demos and previously cut songs.

== Reception and influence ==
Professional ratings
Review scores
Source	Rating
AllMusic	3.5/5 stars
Alternative Press	3/5
Blender	4/5 stars
Pitchfork	8.4/10
Q	3/5 stars
Rolling Stone	4/5 stars
The Rolling Stone Album Guide	3.5/5 stars
Select	4/5
Spin Alternative Record Guide	8/10
The Village Voice	B+

Combat Rock peaked at number 2 on the UK Albums Chart, number 7 on the Billboard Pop albums, and the top ten on many charts in other countries. It was ranked at number 4 among the top "Albums of the Year" for 1982 by NME, with both "Straight to Hell" and "Know Your Rights" ranked among the year's top 50 tracks.

The United States Recording Industry Association of America (RIAA) certified Combat Rock as a Gold album in November 1982, Platinum in January 1983, and Multi-Platinum in June 1995.

In a contemporary review for The Village Voice, Robert Christgau lamented the same attempts at funk and dub the Clash had tried on Sandinista! (1980). Nonetheless, he dismissed the notion the band were selling out and believed they were "evolving" on Combat Rock, writing songs at a "higher level of verbal, musical, and political density", albeit in less "terse and clear" fashion than on their early work.

Douglas Wolk said in a retrospective review for Blender that while the record was originally seen as the Clash's "sellout move" because of its danceable sound and two hit singles, the other songs featured "audaciously bizarre arrangements and some of Strummer's smartest lyrics." Q was less enthusiastic, deeming it "their biggest seller, but the beginning of the end."

In 2000, Alternative Press called it "the penultimate Clash album ... employing lessons learned in the previous three years ... their most commercially rewarded release ... containing [their] most poignant song 'Straight to Hell'."

CMJ New Music Report ranked Combat Rock at number five on its 2004 list of the Top 20 Most-Played Albums of 1982. Slant Magazine listed the album at No. 80 on its list of "Best Albums of the 1980s". Kurt Cobain listed it in his top fifty albums of all time and in a 1991 interview stated "I think the best Clash album is Combat Rock. I fucking love that record! It’s definitely better than Sandinista!“

== Track listing ==
All tracks are written by the Clash, except where noted.

Side one
No.	Title	Writer(s)	Lead vocals	Length
1.	"Know Your Rights"	Strummer, Jones	Joe Strummer	3:39
2.	"Car Jamming"		Strummer	3:58
3.	"Should I Stay or Should I Go"		Mick Jones	3:06
4.	"Rock the Casbah"	Topper Headon, Strummer, Jones	Strummer and Jones	3:42
5.	"Red Angel Dragnet"		Paul Simonon and Kosmo Vinyl	3:48
6.	"Straight to Hell"		Strummer	5:30

Side two
No.	Title	Lead vocals	Length
1.	"Overpowered by Funk"	Strummer and Futura 2000	4:55
2.	"Atom Tan"	Jones and Strummer	2:32
3.	"Sean Flynn"	Strummer	4:30
4.	"Ghetto Defendant"	Strummer and Allen Ginsberg	4:45
5.	"Inoculated City"	Jones and Strummer	2:43^{[I]}
6.	"Death Is a Star"	Strummer and Jones	3:13

=== Fortieth anniversary reissue ===
The songs added to the fortieth anniversary reissue were titled The People's Hall. All tracks are written by the Clash.

Side three
No.	Title	Length
1.	"Outside Bonds"	4:21
2.	"This Is Radio Clash" (different lyrics)	4:11
3.	"Futura 2000"	5:54

Side four
No.	Title	Length
1.	"First Night Back in London"	2:12
2.	"Radio One – Mikey Dread"	6:18
3.	"He Who Dares or Is Tired"	2:53
4.	"Long Time Jerk"	5:10
5.	"The Fulham Connection" (outtake)	3:44

Side five
No.	Title	Length
1.	"Midnight to Stevens" (outtake)	4:36
2.	"Sean Flynn" (extended 'Marcus Music' outtake)	7:23
3.	"Idle in Kangaroo Court"	6:04
4.	"Know Your Rights" (alternate version)	3:22

Notes

- ^{^[I]}: Some copies of the album have an edited version lasting 2:11.

== Personnel ==
The Clash

- Joe Strummer – lead and backing vocals, guitar, harmonica, piano
- Mick Jones – guitar, lead and backing vocals, keyboard, sound effects
- Paul Simonon – bass guitar (except on "Rock the Casbah"), backing vocals, lead vocals on "Red Angel Dragnet"
- Topper Headon – drums, piano and bass guitar on "Rock the Casbah"

Additional musicians

- Allen Ginsberg – guest vocals on "Ghetto Defendant"
- Futura 2000 – guest vocals on "Overpowered by Funk"
- Ellen Foley – backing vocals on "Car Jamming"
- Joe Ely – backing vocals on "Should I Stay or Should I Go"
- Tymon Dogg – piano on "Death Is a Star"
- Tommy Mandel (as Poly Mandell) – keyboards on "Overpowered by Funk"
- Gary Barnacle – saxophone on "Sean Flynn"
- Kosmo Vinyl – vocals on "Red Angel Dragnet"

Production

- The Clash – producers
- Glyn Johns – chief engineer, mixing
- Joe Blaney; Jerry Green; Eddie Garcia – assistant engineers
- Pennie Smith – cover photography, taken March 1982 in Bangkok, Thailand

== Charts ==
Chart (1982–1983)	Peak position
Australian Albums (Kent Music Report)	32
Canada Top Albums/CDs (RPM)	12
Dutch Albums (Album Top 100)	29
Finnish Albums (The Official Finnish Charts)	27
Italian Albums (Musica e Dischi)	22
New Zealand Albums (RMNZ)	5
Norwegian Albums (VG-lista)	7
Swedish Albums (Sverigetopplistan)	9
UK Albums (Official Charts)	2
US Billboard 200	7

Chart (2022)	Peak position
Belgian Albums (Ultratop Flanders)	143
Belgian Albums (Ultratop Wallonia)	65
German Albums (Offizielle Top 100)	48
Italian Albums (FIMI)	70
Japanese Albums (Oricon)	42
Spanish Albums (Promusicae)	56
Scottish Albums (Official Charts)	16
Swiss Albums (Schweizer Hitparade)	56
UK Albums (Official Charts)	16

== Certifications ==
Region	Certification	Certified units/sales
Canada (Music Canada)	Gold	50,000^{^}
France (SNEP)	Gold	100,000^{*}
Italy (FIMI) sales since 2009	Gold	25,000^{‡}
United Kingdom (BPI)	Gold	100,000^{‡}
United States (RIAA)	2× Platinum	2,000,000^{^}
^{*} Sales figures based on certification alone.^{^} Shipments figures based on certification alone.^{‡} Sales+streaming figures based on certification alone.

== Sources ==
- Gray, Marcus (2005) [1995]. The Clash: Return of the Last Gang in Town (5th revised ed.). London: Helter Skelter. ISBN 1-905139-10-1. OCLC 60668626.
