= Bankrobber =

Single by the Clash

from the album Black Market Clash
- B-side: "Rockers Galore... UK Tour"
- Released: 8 August 1980
- Recorded: 1 and 2 February 1980
- Studio: Pluto Studios
- Venue: Manchester, England
- Genre: Reggae; dub
- Length: 4:33
- Label: CBS 8323
- Songwriters: Joe Strummer; Mick Jones
- Producer: Mikey Dread

The Clash singles chronology
"Train in Vain" (1980)	"Bankrobber" (1980)	"The Call Up" (1980)

"Bankrobber" is a song by the English rock band the Clash. The song was not released on any of their studio albums, instead appearing on their compilation Black Market Clash. Upon its 1980 release as a single (initially available in the UK on import only) it peaked at No. 12 on the UK singles chart, and at No. 14 on both the Irish Singles Chart and the New Zealand Singles Chart.

== Music video ==
Don Letts filmed a low-budget video for the song, depicting members of the band recording the song in the studio, interspersed with Clash roadies Baker and Johnny Green wearing bandanas over their faces, performing a bank heist in Lewisham. During the filming, Baker and Green were stopped and questioned by the police, who thought they were genuine. (Note: During the filming for the "Bankrobber" video, Clash roadies Baker and Johnny Green faked a bank job in South London. They were stopped and questioned by the police, who thought they were the real thing.)

== Track listing ==
7" vinyl

1. "Bankrobber" (The Clash) – 4:36
2. "Rockers Galore... UK Tour" (Mikey Dread) – 4:42

== Personnel ==
- Joe Strummer – lead vocal
- Mick Jones – sound effects, guitars
- Paul Simonon – bass
- Topper Headon – drums
- Mick Gallagher – ARP synthesizer, piano
- Mikey Dread – backing vocal, production

== Robber Dub ==
"Robber Dub" is the dub version of "Bankrobber". It was to be included in the 12" single for "Bankrobber", but the label decided not to release the 12" single. (Note: "Robber Dub" is a 'Dread at The Controls' version of The Clash's excellent reggae song "Bankrobber". It was to be included on a 12" single titled "Bankrobber", but the label ended up refusing to release a 12" single version. It is a great song, but doesn't quite match "Justice Tonight/Kick It Over".) The song can be found on their 1980 compilation album Black Market Clash, combined with "Bankrobber" as a 6:16 track, and also on the 1994 compilation album Super Black Market Clash, as a 4:42 standalone track.

== Rockers Galore... UK Tour ==
"Rockers Galore... UK Tour" is a reworking of "Bankrobber" with Mikey Dread singing new lyrics about touring with the Clash. It is not "Robber Dub", which lacks the Dread vocal and lyrics. (Note: "Rockers Galore...UK Tour" is a reworking of "Bankrobber" with Mikey Dread singing new lyrics about touring with the Clash. This is not the same track as "Robber Dub" on SUPER BLACK MARKET CLASH, which lacks the Dread vocal and lyrics.) "Rockers Galore" is also featured on their 2006 compilation album Singles Box.

== Appearances ==
"Bankrobber" is featured in Guy Ritchie's 2008 film, Rocknrolla. It is sung alternately by the older 'Johnny Quid', portrayed by British actor Toby Kebbell, in his dingy flat, and by the younger 'John Cole' in the company of his cruel stepfather, the London mob boss Lenny Cole.

Ian Brown and Pete Garner, later of the Stone Roses, were in attendance at the studio recording session of this single. According to Brown, having heard a rumour that the Clash were recording in Manchester, he and Garner were walking through the city centre when they overheard Topper Headon playing the drums at the city's Pluto Studios: Headon subsequently emerged from the studio and invited the pair in. The full account of this incident is in John Robb's Stone Roses and the Resurrection of British Pop.

== Cover versions ==
Audioweb recorded a rock/reggae cover in 1996 that reached number 19 in the UK Singles Chart.

Chumbawamba's 2005 album A Singsong and a Scrap features an a cappella cover version of the song.

Country rocker Jesse Dayton covered the song on his 2019 release Mixtape Vol. 1.

Tom Morello covered the song acoustically for a Joe Strummer tribute in 2020.

== Charts ==
Artist	Year	Chart	Peak position
The Clash	1980	UK Singles (Official Charts)	12
The Clash	1980	Ireland (IRMA)	14
The Clash	1980	New Zealand (Recorded Music NZ)	14
Audioweb	1997	UK Singles (Official Charts)	19
