= Should I Stay or Should I Go =

1982 single by the Clash

- Standard artwork for 1991 re-release

Single by the Clash

from the album Combat Rock
- A-side: "Straight to Hell" (double A-side)
- Released: 17 September 1982
- Recorded: 1981
- Genre: Punk rock; new wave; pub rock
- Length: 3:06
- Label: CBS; Epic
- Songwriters: Topper Headon; Mick Jones; Paul Simonon; Joe Strummer
- Producer: The Clash

The Clash singles chronology
"Rock the Casbah" (1982)	"Should I Stay or Should I Go" / "Straight to Hell" (1982)	"This Is England" (1985)
"Return to Brixton" (1991)	"Should I Stay or Should I Go" (re-release) (1991)	"Rock the Casbah" (re-release) (1991)

Music video
- "Should I Stay or Should I Go" on YouTube

"Should I Stay or Should I Go" is a song by the English punk rock band the Clash from their fifth studio album, Combat Rock, written in 1981 and featuring Mick Jones on lead vocals. It was released in 1982 as a double A-sided single alongside "Straight to Hell", performing modestly on global music charts. In the United States, "Should I Stay or Should I Go" charted on the Billboard Hot 100 without reaching the top 40. The song received greater attention nearly a decade later as the result of an early-1990s Levi's jeans commercial, leading to the song's 1991 re-release, which topped the UK Singles Chart and reached the top 10 in New Zealand and several European countries. The song was listed in Rolling Stone's 500 Greatest Songs of All Time ranking in 2004.

== Background and production ==
Though the composition was credited to the Clash, Mick Jones was its principal songwriter. Its melody and chord structure shared resemblance with "Little Latin Lupe Lu", which was written by Bill Medley in 1962 and provided a hit for his act the Righteous Brothers the following year, as well as for the Kingsmen in 1964 and Mitch Ryder and the Detroit Wheels in 1966.

Rumours have arisen about the song's lyrical content, such as Jones' impending dismissal from the Clash or the tempestuous personal relationship between Jones and American singer and actress Ellen Foley. "Should I Stay or Should I Go" was thought to be written by Jones about Foley, who sang the backing vocals on Meat Loaf's debut studio album Bat Out of Hell (1977). However, in 1991, Jones said:

It wasn't about anybody specific and it wasn't pre-empting my leaving The Clash. It was just a good rockin' song, our attempt at writing a classic ... When we were just playing, that was the kind of thing we used to like to play.

The Spanish backing vocals were sung by Joe Strummer and Joe Ely. In 1991, Strummer said:

On the spur of the moment I said 'I'm going to do the backing vocals in Spanish'...We needed a translator so Eddie Garcia, the tape operator, called his mother in Brooklyn Heights and read her the lyrics over the phone and she translated them. But Eddie and his mum are Ecuadorian, so it's Ecuadorian Spanish that me and Joe Ely are singing on the backing vocals.

== Releases ==
The song had various single releases. In North America, the American record label Epic Records released one edition with "Inoculated City" as its B-side in May 1982. Another edition by Epic with "First Night Back in London" as its B-side, released in July 1982, peaked at number 45 on the Billboard Hot 100 chart on the week ending 18 September 1982, the edition's tenth week on the chart. Another edition by Epic with "Cool Confusion" as its B-side, released in February 1983, peaked at number 50 in the Billboard Hot 100. Elsewhere, the international record label CBS Records released the song in September 1982 as a double A-side with "Straight to Hell". The double A-side release peaked at number 17 on the UK Single Chart for the week ending 17 October 1982, the release's fifth week on the chart.

Historically, the band rejected companies' requests to use their songs to advertise products, like Dr Pepper and British Telecom. Then in the early 1990s, the company Levi's asked the band members' permission to use the song for a jeans commercial for the British audience. Despite the band often prioritising "creativity and idealism over commercial exploitation", the band members left the decision to the main songwriter Mick Jones, who approved the permission, rationalising that Levi's jeans had been part of the rock music culture rather than something to "object on moral grounds". The song was played for the Levi's commercial and then reissued on 18 February 1991 as a single, a decade after its original release, reaching number one on the UK Singles Chart. It became the band's only number-one single on the UK Chart. In that same year, Jones told NME journalist James Brown that he included Big Audio Dynamite II's "Rush" in the single re-release to promote his newer band.

A live recording of the song was included on the album Live at Shea Stadium, which featured a concert performed on 13 October 1982 in New York City. The song's music video from that performance was included on the DVD The Clash Live: Revolution Rock. Both discs were released on 6 October 2008.

Year	B-side	Format	Label	Country	Note
1982	CBS logo etched into vinyl	45 rpm 7-inch vinyl	Epic ENR-03571	US	One Sided Single - Epic's Get the Hit - Special Low Price
1982	"Cool Confusion"	45 rpm 12-inch vinyl	Epic 07 5P-223	JP	—
1982	"Straight to Hell" (Edit)	45 rpm 12-inch vinyl	CBS CBS A13 2646	UK	—
1982	"Inoculated City"	45 rpm 7-inch vinyl	Epic 14-03006	US	Released in May 1982
1982	"First Night Back in London"	45 rpm 7-inch vinyl	Epic 34-03061	US	Released in July 1982
1982	"Straight to Hell" (Edit)	45 rpm 7-inch vinyl	CBS CBS AII 2646	UK	Picture disc
1982	"Straight to Hell"	45 rpm 7-inch vinyl	CBS CBS A 2646	UK	Released in September 1982
1983	"Cool Confusion"	45 rpm 7-inch vinyl	Epic 34-03547	US	Released in January 1983
1991	1. "Rush (Dance Mix)" (Big Audio Dynamite II); 2. "Protex Blue" (The Clash)	45 rpm 12-inch vinyl CD single	CBS / Sony	UK	A-side: 1. "Should I Stay or Should I Go" (The Clash); 2. "Rush" (Big Audio Dynamite II)

== Critical reception ==
NME journalist Adrian Thrills in 1982 gave the double A-side single release "Straight to Hell"/"Should I Stay or Should I Go" four-and-a-half stars out of five. Despite "Should I Stay or Should I Go" having received more radio airplay, Thrills stated that the single's other A-side track "Straight to Hell" was "the reaffirmation that there is still life in The Clash."

In November 2004, the song was ranked number 228 on "Rolling Stone's 500 Greatest Songs of All Time". In 2009 it was ranked 42nd on VH1's program 100 Greatest Hard Rock Songs.

Scholar Theodore Gracyk wrote in 2007 that the song "is not [as] overtly political" as most of the band's other songs, especially from the album Combat Rock, which carries the song. Gracyk also wrote that new listeners familiar with the song, who then wished to buy Combat Rock or a compilation album containing the song, would be surprised by the band's "strong critique of dominant Western values". Vulture writer Bill Wyman in 2017 ranked the song number 19 of all the band's 139 songs.

== Music video ==
The video for the song was made by Don Letts. It consists of the band's USA tour with images of their visit to New York City, where the band were filmed driving in an open-topped Cadillac to a gig; there, Joe Strummer is featured performing in sunglasses and a Davy Crockett hat and Mick Jones in a red jumpsuit and beret. The concert was at Shea Stadium on 13 October 1982, in the band's second night opening for the Who.

== Opening riff similarity ==
Twitter users accused One Direction's 2012 hit single "Live While We're Young" of copying the song's opening guitar riff. According to Alexis Petridis of The Guardian, the guitar is played twice between the riff with the plectrum stroking the strings, while it is pressed. One note in the chord is changed, which Petridis surmised was probably to avoid paying any royalty to the Clash.

== Charts ==
=== Original release ===
Chart (1982–1983)	Peak position
Australia (Kent Music Report)	37
Canada Top Singles (RPM)	40
Ireland (IRMA)	16
UK Singles (Official Charts)	17
US Billboard Hot 100	45
US Rock Top Tracks (Billboard)	13
US Cash Box Top 100	63

=== 1991 reissue ===
==== Weekly charts ====
Chart (1991–1992)	Peak position
Austria (Ö3 Austria Top 40)	5
Belgium (Ultratop 50 Flanders)	3
Denmark (IFPI)	6
Europe (Eurochart Hot 100)	4
Europe (European Hit Radio)	13
Finland (Suomen virallinen lista)	5
France (SNEP)	25
Germany (GfK)	5
Greece (IFPI)	9
Ireland (IRMA)	2
Netherlands (Dutch Top 40)	6
Netherlands (Single Top 100)	3
New Zealand (Recorded Music NZ)	2
Norway (VG-lista)	3
Portugal (AFP)	10
Sweden (Sverigetopplistan)	6
Switzerland (Schweizer Hitparade)	4
UK Singles (Official Charts)	1
UK Airplay (Music Week)	11

==== Year-end charts ====
Chart (1991)	Rank
Belgium (Ultratop 50 Flanders)	38
Europe (Eurochart Hot 100 Singles)	21
Germany (Media Control)	31
Netherlands (Dutch Top 40)	43
Netherlands (Single Top 100)	52
Sweden (Topplistan)	27
Switzerland (Schweizer Hitparade)	21
UK Singles (OCC)	19

Chart (1992)	Rank
New Zealand (RIANZ)	17

=== Later re-chartings ===
==== Weekly charts ====
Chart (2026)	Peak position
Global 200 (Billboard)	126
Greece International (IFPI)	64
Portugal (AFP)	138

==== Decade-end charts ====
Chart (2025–2026)	Rank
Russia Streaming (TopHit)	166

== Certifications ==
Region	Certification	Certified units/sales
Denmark (IFPI Danmark)	Gold	45,000^{‡}
Germany (BVMI)	Gold	250,000^{‡}
Italy (FIMI)	2× Platinum	140,000^{‡}
New Zealand (RMNZ)	4× Platinum	120,000^{‡}
Portugal (AFP)	3× Platinum	75,000^{‡}
Spain (Promusicae)	2× Platinum	120,000^{‡}
United Kingdom (BPI)	3× Platinum	1,800,000^{‡}
Streaming
Greece (IFPI Greece)	Platinum	2,000,000^{†}
^{‡} Sales+streaming figures based on certification alone.^{†} Streaming-only figures based on certification alone.

== See also ==
- List of UK Singles Chart number ones of the 1990s
- "The Globe"

== Bibliography ==
- Gray, Marcus (2004). The Clash: Return of the Last Gang in Town. Hal Leonard LLC. ISBN 0-634-04673-X. LCCN 2002008977.
