= (White Man) In Hammersmith Palais =

Single by the Clash

from the album The Clash (US version)
- B-side: "The Prisoner"
- Released: 16 June 1978
- Recorded: March–April 1978
- Studio: Basing Street Studios (London)
- Genre: Punk rock; reggae; reggae rock
- Length: 3:59
- Label: CBS S CBS 6383
- Songwriters: Joe Strummer; Mick Jones
- Producers: Sandy Pearlman; The Clash

The Clash singles chronology
"Clash City Rockers" (1978)	"(White Man) In Hammersmith Palais" (1978)	"Tommy Gun" (1978)

Music video
- "(White Man) In Hammersmith Palais" (short version) on YouTube

Audio video
- "(White Man) In Hammersmith Palais" (full version) on YouTube

"(White Man) In Hammersmith Palais" is a song by the English rock band the Clash. It was originally released as a 7-inch single, with the B-side "The Prisoner", on 16 June 1978 through CBS Records.

Produced by The Clash and engineered by Simon Humphries, the song was recorded for (but not included on) the group's second studio album Give 'Em Enough Rope; it was later featured on the American version of their debut studio album, The Clash, between the single version of "White Riot" and "London's Burning".

== Inspiration and composition ==
The song showed considerable musical and lyrical maturity for the band at the time. Compared with their other early singles, it is stylistically more in line with their version of Lee "Scratch" Perry-Junior Murvin's "Police and Thieves" as the powerful guitar intro of "(White Man) In Hammersmith Palais" descends into a slower ska rhythm, and was disorienting to a lot of the fans who had grown used to their earlier work. According to Mick Jones, "The music is a mixture of the reggae influence and punk, and was the next step after Police And Thieves". "We were a big fat riff group", Joe Strummer noted in the Clash's film Westway to the World. "We weren't supposed to do something like that." The song's opening line "Midnight to six, man for the first time from Jamaica" is a direct reference to the Pretty Things' 1965 single "Midnight to Six Man".

"(White Man) In Hammersmith Palais" starts by recounting an all-night reggae "showcase" night at the Hammersmith Palais in Shepherd's Bush Road, London, that was attended by Joe Strummer, Don Letts and roadie Roadent, and was headlined by Dillinger, Leroy Smart and Delroy Wilson. Strummer was disappointed and disillusioned that these performances had been more "pop" and "lightweight" similar to Ken Boothe's brand of reggae, using Four Tops-like dance routines, and that the acts had been "performances" rather than the "roots rock rebel[lion]" that he had been hoping for.

The song then moves away from the disappointing concert to address various other themes, nearly all relating to the state of the United Kingdom at the time. The song first gives an anti-violence message, then addresses the state of "wealth distribution" in the UK, promotes unity between black and white youths of the country before moving on to address the state of the British punk rock scene in 1978 which was becoming more mainstream.

Included is a jibe at unnamed groups who wear Burton suits. In an NME article at the time, Strummer said this was targeted at the power pop fad hyped by journalists as the next big thing in 1978. The lyric concludes that the new groups are in it only for money and fame.

The final lines refer to right-wing politics, noting sardonically that things were getting to the point where even Adolf Hitler could expect to be sent a limousine if he "flew in today".

The single was issued in June 1978 with four different colour sleeves – blue, green, yellow and pink.

This song was one of Joe Strummer's favourites. He continued to play it live with his new band the Mescaleros and it was played at his funeral.

The song is used in the 2017 film T2 Trainspotting.

== Critical reception ==
"(White Man) In Hammersmith Palais" helped the Clash assert themselves as a more versatile band musically and politically than many of their peers, and it broke the exciting but limiting punk mould that had been established by the Sex Pistols; from now on the Clash would be "the thinking man's yobs".

The song immediately became a firm favourite of Clash fans. In the 1978 NME end-of-year readers poll it was voted the single of the year. It was number 7 in John Peel's Festive Fifty in 1978, voted by listeners to the show.

"The song remains the ultimate embodiment of everything that was so great about the group" (Kris Needs, ZigZag (magazine). "Maybe the greatest record ever written by white men" (Alan McGee, Creation Records).

Robert Christgau recommended the single in his Consumer Guide published by The Village Voice on 4 September 1978, and described the song as "a must". Denise Sullivan of AllMusic wrote that "(White Man) In Hammersmith Palais" "may have actually been the first song to merge punk and reggae". Consequence of Sound described it as "one of Strummer's greatest lyrical compositions".

The song was ranked at No. 8 among the top "Tracks of the Year" for 1978 by NME. In 2004, Rolling Stone rated the song as No. 430 in its list of the 500 Greatest Songs of All Time. In December 2003, the British music magazine Uncut ranked the song No. 1 on their "The Clash's 30 best songs" list. The list was chosen by a panel including former band members Terry Chimes aka ("Tory Crimes"), Mick Jones, and Paul Simonon. In 2015, the Guardian ranked it No. 2 on Dave Simpson's "The Clash: 10 of the best" list, and in 2020 it appeared in the number one position in Simpson's list of "The Clash's 40 greatest songs – ranked!" Stereogum ranked it No. 4 on their "The 10 Best Clash Songs" list.

== Track listing ==
All tracks written by Joe Strummer/Mick Jones.

7" vinyl

1. "(White Man) In Hammersmith Palais" – 4:00
2. "The Prisoner" – 2:59

== Personnel ==
=== "(White Man) In Hammersmith Palais" ===
- Joe Strummer – lead vocals, piano
- Mick Jones – backing vocals, lead guitar, harmonica
- Paul Simonon – bass guitar
- Topper Headon – drums

=== "The Prisoner" ===
- Mick Jones – lead vocals, lead guitar, rhythm guitar, acoustic guitar
- Joe Strummer – backing vocals, lead guitar, rhythm guitar
- Paul Simonon – bass guitar
- Topper Headon – drums

== Charts ==
Chart (1978)	Peak position
UK Singles (Official Charts)	32

== Cover versions ==
Fighting Gravity covered the song on their 1999 live double album Hello Cleveland. In that same year, 311 contributed their rendition of the song to the charity album Burning London: The Clash Tribute.
