= White Riot =

1977 single by the Clash

- L-R: Strummer, Jones, Simonon

Single by the Clash

from the album The Clash
- B-side: "1977"
- Released: 18 March 1977
- Recorded: February 1977 (single version)
- Genre: Punk rock
- Length: 1:58
- Label: CBS
- Songwriters: Joe Strummer; Mick Jones
- Producer: Micky Foote

The Clash singles chronology
"White Riot" (1977)	"Remote Control" (1977)

Music video
- "White Riot" on YouTube

"White Riot" is a song by the English punk rock band the Clash, released as the band's first single in March 1977 and also included on their self-titled debut album.

== Versions ==
There are two versions of the song: the single version (also appearing on the US version of the album released in 1979), was one of the first songs they recorded at CBS Studio 3 on Whitfield Street in Central London, after signing with CBS Records. However, when they were recording the debut album, they decided to use a demo version of the song that they had recorded earlier in 1976 at Beaconsfield Studios in Buckinghamshire with Julien Temple. The rest of the demo tracks would eventually be released on the Sound System compilation album.

The album version has a running time of 1:58 and starts with Mick Jones counting off "1-2-3-4". The single version begins with the sound of a police siren and has a running time of 1:55.

== Composition ==
The only thing we're saying about the blacks is that they've got their problems and they're prepared to deal with them. But white men, they just ain't prepared to deal with them – everything's too cozy. They've got stereos, drugs, hi-fis, cars. The poor blacks and the poor whites are in the same boat.

— Joe Strummer

Lyrically, the song is about class struggle and race and thus proved controversial; some people thought it was advocating a kind of race war.

The song was written after Joe Strummer and bassist Paul Simonon were involved in the riots at the Notting Hill Carnival of 1976.

The Clash – "White Riot" (1977)
Sample of the song's end of first refrain and then partial first verse

In an interview with the New Musical Express in December 1976, Joe Strummer responded angrily to the suggestion that some people misinterpreted the "White Riot" lyrics as racist, saying, "They're not racist! They're not racist at all!" Strummer pointed out that inner-city black youth were now fighting back against poverty and heavy-handed policing. "White Riot" was a call to arms to white youth to fight back in the same way and have, in the words of the song, "a riot of my own".

When the Clash played the Rock Against Racism Carnival in Victoria Park, London on 30 April 1978 they finished their set with "White Riot", accompanied by Jimmy Pursey (Sham 69) on vocals. Footage of this performance can be seen in the film Rude Boy.

== Sleeve ==
The single's cover photograph was taken by Caroline Coon on 5 November 1976 at the band's rehearsal studio in Camden Town. The photo was inspired by real-life events where youths were randomly stopped and searched by police in the street. The original shot featured the phrase "Hate and War" on the back of Strummer's boiler suit, which was airbrushed for the released version and replaced with "1977".

== Reception ==
The only person who played 'White Riot' on the radio was John Peel – and he's gone on holiday. You play our record against any of the other stuff and it just knocks spots off them left, right and centre. They must be cunts for not playing it.

— Joe Strummer

The Clash performed "White Riot" in public for the first time when they played the 100 Club Punk Festival on 20 September 1976. "White Riot" is considered a classic in the Clash canon, although as the band matured, Mick Jones would at times refuse to play it, considering it crude and musically inept. Over two decades later, Joe Strummer would perform it with his band the Mescaleros. The B-side of the single was "1977", a non-album track. This song was along similar lines to "White Riot", suggesting that the music of Elvis Presley, the Beatles, and the Rolling Stones was no longer relevant.

Writing for Melody Maker in November 1976, Caroline Coon described the song as "played with the force of an acetylene torch". On its release in March 1977, the New Musical Express declared, "'White Riot' isn't a poxy Single of the Week, it's the first meaningful event all year … The Clash aren't just a band, and this is more than just a single." Billboard described it as "the most controversial song the Clash ever did".

In March 2005, Q magazine placed "White Riot" at number 34 in its list of the 100 Greatest Guitar Tracks.

== Track listing ==
All tracks written by Joe Strummer/Mick Jones.

7" vinyl

1. "White Riot" – 2:00
2. "1977" – 1:40

== Personnel ==
- Joe Strummer – rhythm guitar, lead vocal
- Mick Jones – lead guitar, backing vocal
- Paul Simonon – bass guitar
- Terry Chimes – drums

== Charts ==
Chart performance for "White Riot"
Chart (1977)	Peak position
UK Singles (Official Charts)	38

== Cover versions ==
The song was covered by Clash contemporaries Sham 69. The punk rock/Oi! band Cock Sparrer also did a live cover version of the song, which even appeared on their The Best of Cock Sparrer and England Belongs to Me albums. The Mekons' first single, "Never Been in a Riot", was a response to "White Riot".

The song has been covered by, among others, hip-hop/punk rock band the Transplants, rock band Camper Van Beethoven, punk rock band Anti-Flag, Rise Against, Cracker, the Bad Shepherds alternative rock band Audioslave, and the Angelic Upstarts. The American Celtic punk band Dropkick Murphys have covered the song live, one recording of which is on their The Singles Collection: Volume One album. It was also performed by Rage Against the Machine at their free concert in Finsbury Park and at Download Festival in June 2010.

Punk rock band Rise Against covered the song during their shows at the Reading and Leeds Festivals in 2011 after vocalist Tim McIlrath made a speech about the London riots of 2011.
