= The Magnificent Seven (song) =

- UK vinyl single showing a clock set to 7:00 a.m., as in the song's lyrics

Single by the Clash

from the album Sandinista!
- B-side: "The Magnificent Dance"
- Released: 10 April 1981 (U.K.)
- Recorded: April 1980
- Studio: Electric Lady (New York City)
- Genre: Funk; hip-hop; rap rock
- Length: 5:33
- Label: CBS
- Songwriters: Joe Strummer; Mick Jones; Topper Headon; Norman Watt-Roy; Mickey Gallagher
- Producer: The Clash

The Clash singles chronology
"Hitsville UK" (1981)	"The Magnificent Seven" (1981)	"This Is Radio Clash" (1981)

Music video
- "The Magnificent Seven" on YouTube

"The Magnificent Seven" is a song by the English rock band the Clash. Released in 1981, it was the third single from the Clash's fourth studio album, Sandinista!. It reached No. 34 on the UK singles chart.

== Composition ==
The song was inspired by old school hip hop acts from New York City, like the Sugarhill Gang and Grandmaster Flash & the Furious Five. Rap was still a new and emerging music genre at the time, and the band, especially Mick Jones, was very impressed with it, so much so that Jones took to carrying a boombox around and got the nickname "Whack Attack".

"The Magnificent Seven" was recorded in April 1980 at Electric Lady Studios in New York City, built around a funky bass loop played by Norman Watt-Roy of the Blockheads. Joe Strummer wrote the words on the spot, a technique that was also used to create Sandinista!'s other rap track, "Lightning Strikes (Not Once But Twice)". Strummer said of the group's encounter with hip hop:

When we came to the U.S., Mick stumbled upon a music shop in Brooklyn that carried the music of Grand Master Flash and the Furious Five, the Sugar Hill Gang...these groups were radically changing music and they changed everything for us.

Though it failed to chart in America, the song was a hit on underground and college radio. Music critic Jeff Chang wrote that in New York City, the song "had become an unlikely hit on the Black radio station WBLS". Also popular were various dance remixes, including the official B-side ("The Magnificent Dance") and original DJ remixes. WBLS' "Dirty Harry" remix appears on various Clash bootlegs, including Clash on Broadway Disc 4: The Outtakes.

The single was reissued in 1981 with "Stop the World" as its B-side and with different sleeve art.

== The Magnificent Dance ==
"The Magnificent Dance", released on 12 April 1981 by CBS in 12-inch single format, is the dance remix of "The Magnificent Seven". The maxi single was released in the UK featuring an edited version of "The Magnificent Seven" on side A, and in the US, where it was backed with the extended version of "The Cool Out". It is credited to "Pepe Unidos", a pseudonym for Strummer, Paul Simonon and manager Bernie Rhodes. "Pepe Unidos" also produced "The Cool Out", a remix of "The Call Up". This dance version "definitely capitalized on the funky groove of the original, adding in some very cool drumming".

In 2015, Pitchfork Media included the song on its "Early '80s Disco" playlist, saying "if they were bored with the USA in 1977, four years on, they were also bored with both punk and rock. Instead, they became infatuated with NYC street culture, from early hip-hop to post-disco. This dubbed-out disco remix of the lead track off of Sandinista! was a club hit and the record Larry Levan would use to fine tune the sound system at the Paradise Garage."

"The Magnificent Dance" was used as the theme song for the 2000 Channel Four television drama series North Square.

== Track listing ==
All tracks written by Mick Jones/Joe Strummer/Topper Headon/Norman Watt-Roy/Mickey Gallagher; except where indicated. "The Magnificent Seven" originally solely credited to The Clash.

7" vinyl (Europe)

1. "The Magnificent Seven" – 3:33
2. "The Magnificent Dance" – 3:26

7" vinyl (North America) / 12" vinyl (UK)

1. "The Magnificent Seven" – 4:22
2. "The Magnificent Dance" – 5:29

12" vinyl (Europe)

1. "The Magnificent Seven (Special Remix)" – 2:16
2. "The Magnificent Dance" – 5:29
3. "The Call Up" (The Clash) – 4:50
4. "The Cool Out" (The Clash) – 2:57

12" vinyl (US)

1. "The Call Up" (The Clash) – 4:50
2. "The Cool Out" (The Clash) – 2:57
3. "The Magnificent Dance" – 5:36
4. "The Magnificent Seven" – 2:16

12" vinyl promo (US)

1. "The Magnificent Seven" – 5:31
2. "Lightning Strikes (Not Once But Twice) (The Clash) – 4:49
3. "One More Time" (The Clash/Mikey Dread) – 3:32
4. "One More Dub" (The Clash/Mikey Dread) – 3:34

== Personnel ==
- Joe Strummer – lead and backing vocals, electric piano
- Mick Jones – lead guitars, backing vocals, sound effects
- Topper Headon – drums, backing vocals
- Norman Watt-Roy – bass guitar

== Charts ==
Year	Chart	Peak position
1981	UK Singles Chart	34
1981	Belgium (Ultratop 50 Flanders)	18
1981	Dutch Single Chart	21
1982	US Billboard Club Play Singles	21
