= List of the Clash band members =

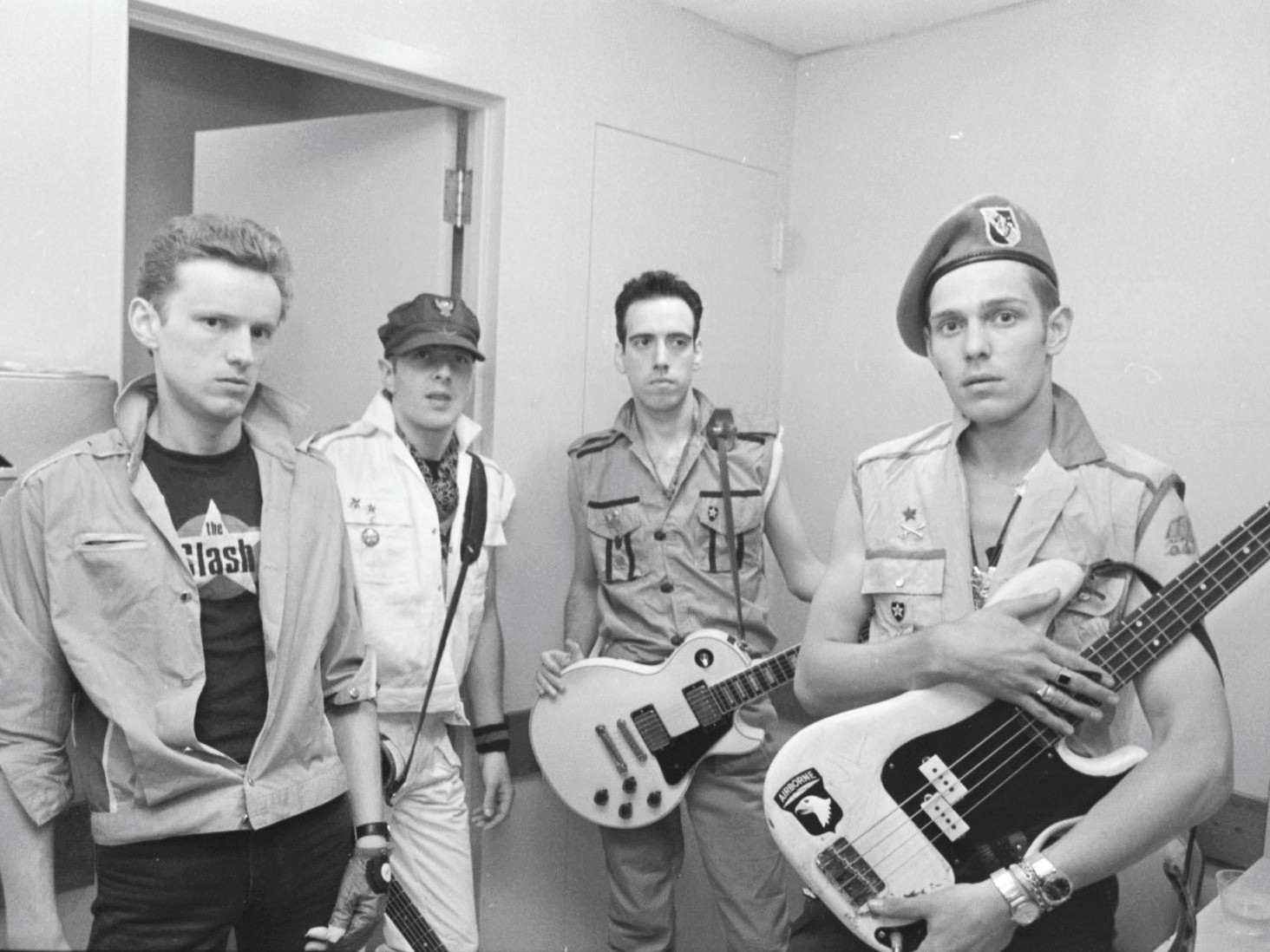
The Clash in 1982, from left to right: Terry Chimes, Joe Strummer, Mick Jones, Paul Simonon.

The Clash were an English punk rock band formed in 1976 initially consisting of Joe Strummer (lead vocals, guitar), Mick Jones (lead vocals, lead guitar), Paul Simonon (bass guitar), Keith Levene (guitar) and Terry Chimes (drums and percussion). Levene was dismissed in September 1976 and went on to form Public Image Ltd. Terry Chimes performed intermittently as drummer for the first year of the band's existence, before leaving in November 1976 and was briefly replaced by Rob Harper as the Clash toured in support of the Sex Pistols during December's Anarchy Tour. Topper Headon was recruited in May 1977 as the band's permanent drummer, forming the classic Clash line-up which would remain together until 1982.

Headon was dismissed in May 1982 due to drug addiction problems, and Chimes returned in Headon's place. Headon had often acted as a mediating force between the two strong personalities in the band, Strummer and Jones, and in his absence the band began to disintegrate. In May 1983 Chimes left once more and was replaced by Pete Howard. In September 1983, Mick Jones was dismissed due to continued conflict and infighting. Vince White and Nick Sheppard were recruited by band manager Bernard Rhodes as guitarists to replace the departing Jones. The recording of their final album Cut the Crap was chaotic and there was little chemistry between the new group members and the remaining core of the band. Strummer left before it was completed, leaving the final mixes to Rhodes. After a short tour in support of the album in January 1985, the band went on hiatus, which became permanent when the band officially dissolved in 1986.

== Band members ==
=== Official members ===
Images	Name	Time active	Main instruments	Occasional instruments	Release contributions
	Joe Strummer	May 1976–1986 (died 2002)	lead and backing vocals; rhythm guitar; piano	lead guitar; bass; harmonica; keyboards	all Clash releases
	Paul Simonon	May 1976–1986	bass; backing vocals	lead vocals; rhythm guitar	all Clash releases
	Mick Jones	May 1976–September 1983	lead guitar; keyboards; lead and backing vocals	rhythm guitar; harmonica; piano; bass	all Clash releases except Cut the Crap (1985)
	Terry Chimes	May–November 1976; February–May 1977; May 1982–May 1983	drums; percussion	none	The Clash (1977)
	Keith Levene	May–September 1976 (died 2022)	lead and rhythm guitar	none	none
	Rob Harper	December 1976–January 1977	drums	none	none
	Topper Headon	May 1977–May 1982	drums; percussion	bass; piano; lead and backing vocals	all Clash releases except Cut the Crap (1985)
	Pete Howard	May 1983–1986	drums	none	Cut the Crap (1985)
	Vince White	1983–1986	rhythm and lead guitar	none	Cut the Crap (1985)
	Nick Sheppard	1983–1986	lead and rhythm guitar; backing and occasional lead vocals	none	Cut the Crap (1985)

== Session members or groups ==
Image	Name	Time active	Main Instruments	Release contributions
	Allen Lanier	1978	piano	Give 'Em Enough Rope (1978)
	Stan Bronstein	1978	saxophone	Give 'Em Enough Rope (1978)
	Bob Andrews	1978	keyboards	Give 'Em Enough Rope (1978)
	Mickey Gallagher	1979–1980	organ; keyboards; synthesizers	London Calling (1979); Sandinista! (1980); From Here to Eternity: Live (1999)
	The Irish Horns: Ray Bevis – tenor saxophone; John Earle – tenor and baritone saxophone; Chris Gower – trombone; Dick Hanson –; trumpet; flugelhorn	1979	horns	London Calling (1979)
	Tymon Dogg	1980–1982	vocals; violin; keyboards; piano	Sandinista! (1980); Combat Rock (1982)
	Norman Watt-Roy	1980; 1985	bass guitar	Sandinista! (1980); Cut the Crap (1985)
	J.P. Nicholson	1980	bass guitar	Sandinista! (1980)
	Davey Payne	1980	saxophone	Sandinista! (1980)
	Gary Barnacle	1980–1982	saxophone	Sandinista! (1980); Black Market Clash (1980); Combat Rock (1982)
	Arthur Edward Barnacle	1980	trumpet	Sandinista! (1980)
	Rick Gascoigne	1980	trombone	Sandinista! (1980)
	Lew Lewis	1980	harmonica	Sandinista! (1980)
	Ellen Foley	1980–1982	vocals	Sandinista! (1980); Combat Rock (1982)
	Mikey Dread	1980	vocals	Sandinista! (1980); From Here to Eternity: Live (1999)
	Band Sgt. Dave Yates	1980	vocals	Sandinista! (1980)
	Den Hegarty	1980	vocals	Sandinista! (1980)
	Luke & Ben Gallagher	1980	vocals	Sandinista! (1980)
	Maria Gallagher	1980	vocals	Sandinista! (1980)
	Ivan Julian	1980	guitar	Sandinista! (1980)
	Noel "Tempo" Bailey	1980	guitar	Sandinista! (1980)
	Anthony Nelson Steelie	1980	keyboards	Sandinista! (1980)
	Style Scott	1980	drums	Sandinista! (1980)
	Jody Linscott	1980	percussion	Sandinista! (1980)
	Allen Ginsberg	1981–1982	vocals	Combat Rock (1982)
	Futura 2000	1981–1982	vocals	Combat Rock (1982)
	Kosmo Vinyl	1981–1982	vocals	Combat Rock (1982)
	Joe Ely	1981–1982	backing vocals	Combat Rock (1982)
	Tommy Mandel	1981–1982	keyboards	Combat Rock (1982)
	Hermann Weindorf	1985	keyboards	Cut the Crap (1985)
	Michael Fayne	1985	drum machine; vocals	Cut the Crap (1985)

== Line-ups ==
Period	Members	Releases
May–September 1976	Joe Strummer – lead vocals; Mick Jones – lead and rhythm guitar, vocals; Keith Levene – rhythm and lead guitar; Paul Simonon – bass, vocals; Terry Chimes – drums	None
September–November 1976	Joe Strummer – lead vocals, rhythm guitar; Mick Jones – lead guitar, vocals; Paul Simonon – bass, vocals; Terry Chimes – drums	None
December 1976–January 1977	Joe Strummer – lead vocals, rhythm guitar; Mick Jones – lead guitar, vocals; Paul Simonon – bass, vocals; Rob Harper – drums	None
February–May 1977	Joe Strummer – lead vocals, rhythm guitar, keyboards; Mick Jones – lead guitar, vocals; Paul Simonon – bass, vocals; Terry Chimes – drums	The Clash (1977); Black Market Clash (1980); The Story of the Clash, Volume 1 (1988); 1977 Revisited (1990); Clash on Broadway (1991) – half a side only; The Singles (1991) – some tracks; Super Black Market Clash (1993) – two tracks only
May 1977 – May 1982 (Classic lineup)	Joe Strummer – lead vocals, rhythm guitar, keyboards; Mick Jones – lead guitar, vocals, keyboards; Paul Simonon – bass, vocals; Topper Headon – drums, percussion, vocals	Give 'Em Enough Rope (1978); London Calling (1979); Black Market Clash (1980); Sandinista! (1980); Combat Rock (1982); The Story of the Clash, Volume 1 (1988); 1977 Revisited (1990) – two tracks only; Clash on Broadway (1991); The Singles (1991) – some tracks; Super Black Market Clash (1993); From Here to Eternity: Live (1999) – some tracks
May 1982 – May 1983	Joe Strummer – lead vocals, rhythm guitar, keyboards; Mick Jones – lead guitar, vocals, keyboards; Paul Simonon – bass, vocals; Terry Chimes – drums	From Here to Eternity: Live (1999) – some tracks; Live at Shea Stadium (2008)
May 1983–September 1983	Joe Strummer – lead vocals, rhythm guitar, piano; Mick Jones – lead guitar, vocals, keyboards; Paul Simonon – bass, vocals; Pete Howard – drums	none – live shows only
1983–1986	Joe Strummer – lead vocals, rhythm guitar; Nick Sheppard – lead guitar, vocals; Vince White – rhythm and lead guitar; Paul Simonon – bass, vocals; Pete Howard – drums	Cut the Crap (1985) (without Simonon and Howard); Joe Strummer 001 (2018) – one track only
