= The Singles (1991 The Clash album) =

Compilation album by The Clash
- Released: 4 November 1991
- Recorded: 1977–1982
- Genre: Punk rock
- Length: 64:46
- Label: Epic

The Clash compilations and lives chronology
Clash on Broadway (1991)	The Singles (1991)	Super Black Market Clash (1993)

Singles from The Singles
- 1. "Should I Stay or Should I Go" Released: March 1991; 2. "Rock the Casbah" Released: April 1991; 3. "London Calling" Released: June 1991; 4. "Train in Vain" Released: October 1991

Professional ratings
Review scores
Source	Rating
AllMusic	4/5 stars

The Singles is a compilation album by the English punk rock band the Clash. It includes all of the band's singles, in their original single versions, except for 1977's Capital Radio (which, whilst not eligible for chart entry due to being a free EP, is still considered a single) and 1985's "This Is England", due to its parent album, Cut the Crap (1985), being disowned by the band at that time.

This collection contains the actual A-side recording of the "This Is Radio Clash" single. Other compilations, such as Super Black Market Clash (1993) and the US version of The Essential Clash (2003), contain the B-side "Radio Clash" under the title "This Is Radio Clash" instead.

A remastered version, with slightly altered artwork, was released in 1999 as part of Sony's Clash reissue campaign.

== Track listing ==
All tracks by Joe Strummer and Mick Jones, except where noted.

1. "White Riot" – 1:57
2. "Remote Control" – 2:58
3. "Complete Control" – 3:11
4. "Clash City Rockers" – 3:46
5. "(White Man) In Hammersmith Palais" – 3:58
6. "Tommy Gun" – 3:13
7. "English Civil War" (Trad arr. Strummer/Jones) – 2:34
8. "I Fought the Law" (Sonny Curtis) – 2:38
9. "London Calling" – 3:17
10. "Train in Vain" – 3:06
11. "Bankrobber" – 4:32
12. "The Call Up" (Strummer/Jones/Paul Simonon/Topper Headon) – 5:21
13. "Hitsville U.K." (Strummer/Jones/Simonon/Headon) – 4:19
14. "The Magnificent Seven" (Strummer/Jones/Simonon/Headon) – 4:26
15. "This Is Radio Clash" (Strummer/Jones/Simonon/Headon) – 4:08
16. "Know Your Rights" – 3:35
17. "Rock the Casbah" (Strummer/Jones/Headon) – 3:35
18. "Should I Stay or Should I Go" (Strummer/Jones/Simonon/Headon) – 3:08

== Charts ==
=== Weekly charts ===
Chart (1991–1992)	Peak position
New Zealand Albums (RMNZ)	2
UK Albums (OCC)	68

=== Year-end charts ===
Chart (1992)	Position
New Zealand Albums (RMNZ)	29

== Certifications ==
Region	Certification	Certified units/sales
Italy (FIMI)	Gold	25,000^{*}
New Zealand (RMNZ)	Platinum	15,000^{^}
^{*} Sales figures based on certification alone.^{^} Shipments figures based on certification alone.
