= The Clash on film =

The Clash were an English rock band that formed in 1976 as part of the original wave of British punk rock. Along with punk rock, they experimented with reggae, ska, dub, funk, rap and rockabilly. For most of their recording career, The Clash consisted of Joe Strummer (lead vocals, rhythm guitar), Mick Jones (lead guitar, vocals), and Paul Simonon (bass, backing vocals, occasional lead vocals), with Terry Chimes or Nicky "Topper" Headon on drums and percussion. The band features in several documentaries and other films.

Year	Film	Director
1980	Rude Boy Honorable Mention and Nominated for the Golden Berlin Bear at the Berlin International Film Festival 1980.	Jack Hazan and David Mingay
1983	The King of Comedy Joe Strummer, Mick Jones and Paul Simonon have cameos.	Martin Scorsese
1983	Hell W10 Black and white silent film written by Joe Strummer featured on The Essential Clash (DVD).	Joe Strummer
2000	The Clash: Westway to the World Awarded Best Long Form Music Video at the Grammy Awards 2003.	Don Letts
2006	The Clash: Up Close and Personal	—
2007	Joe Strummer: The Future Is Unwritten Nominated Grand Jury Prize at the Sundance Film Festival 2007; Awarded Best British Documentary at the British Independent Film Awards 2007; Nominated Best Single Documentary at Irish Film and Television Awards 2008	Julien Temple
2008	The Clash Live: Revolution Rock	Don Letts
2012	The Rise and Fall of The Clash	Danny Garcia
2016	London Town In '70s London, a 14-year-old boy is introduced to the Clash by his estranged mother. It changes his life forever.	Derrick Borte

== See also ==
- The Clash discography
- List of The Clash songs
