= Cut the Crap =

Cut the Crap!

Studio album by the Clash
- Released: 4 November 1985
- Recorded: January–March 1985
- Studios: Weryton (Unterföhring, Germany)
- Genre: Punk rock
- Length: 38:21
- Label: CBS (UK)
- Producer: Jose Unidos (a.k.a. Bernard Rhodes)

The Clash chronology
Combat Rock (1982)	Cut the Crap! (1985)

Singles from Cut the Crap
- 1. "This Is England" Released: 30 September 1985

Cut the Crap! is the sixth and final studio album by the English punk band the Clash, released on 4 November 1985 by CBS Records. It was recorded in early 1985 at Weryton Studios, Munich, following a turbulent period: co-founder, lead guitarist and co-principal songwriter Mick Jones and drummer Topper Headon had been dismissed by lead vocalist Joe Strummer and bassist Paul Simonon (the latter of whom is nevertheless absent from the album). Jones and Headon were replaced by three unknowns: guitarists Vince White and Nick Sheppard and drummer Pete Howard. During the tense recording sessions, Clash manager Bernie Rhodes (who produced the album under the pseudonym "Jose Unidos") and Strummer fought each other for control over the band's songwriting and musical direction.

Strummer and Rhodes co-wrote most of the songs. During production, Rhodes took charge of the arrangements, track sequencing and the final mix. His production choices, which rely heavily on Strummer's preference for synthetic drum sounds and Rhodes's own inclusion of sampling, were widely derided. One writer described the album's sound as brash and seemingly "designed to sound hip and modern—'80s style!" Rhodes chose the album title, taken from a line in the 1981 post-apocalyptic film Mad Max 2. The recording process and tension between Rhodes and Strummer left other band members disillusioned. White's and Sheppard's contributions are almost entirely absent in the final mix, all of the bass parts were provided by former Blockheads bassist, Norman Watt-Roy and Howard was replaced by an electronic drum machine. Epic Records hoped the album would advance the Clash's success in the United States, and planned an expensive video for a lead single.

On release, Cut the Crap! was maligned in the UK music press as "one of the most disastrous [albums] ever released by a major artist". Strummer disowned the album and dissolved the Clash within weeks of its release. He performed only one song from the album live during his solo career, and the album has been excluded altogether from most of the Clash's compilations and box sets. The album is also not featured in the discography section on the band's official website. Although generally regarded as the band's weakest album, contemporary critics nevertheless have praised Strummer's songwriting and vocal performance, especially on the tracks "This Is England", "Dirty Punk" and "Three Card Trick".

== Background ==
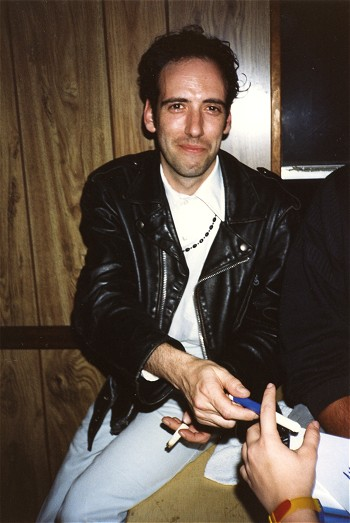
Founding Clash guitarist Mick Jones in 1987

The Clash's internal difficulties during 1983 led to two of its core members being fired: guitarist Mick Jones was seen as adopting rock star posturing that lead vocalist Joe Strummer considered anathema to what the band stood for, and drummer Topper Headon had developed a heroin addiction which left him unreliable. After the band undertook rehearsals in London during June 1983, interpersonal tensions reemerged. The two principal songwriters no longer trusted each other, due to Jones's frequent absence from rehearsals and use of synthesizers. Both Jones and bassist Paul Simonon have said that they refused to sign the contract negotiated by manager Bernie Rhodes, who had earlier been fired due to personal differences with Jones.

The relationship between Strummer and Jones had broken down by this point. Not long into rehearsals, Strummer and Simonon had fired Jones. (Note: Simonon has said that Rhodes had not been aware of, nor later approved of, Jones's firing.) A week before the official announcement of the dismissal, Strummer, Simonon and Rhodes began to look for replacements and met Pete Howard. The band placed anonymous advertisements for replacement guitarists in the magazine Melody Maker. After auditioning over 100 candidates, they eventually hired unknown musicians Nick Sheppard and Greg White. White took the pseudonym Vince after Simonon complained that he would prefer to quit than play in a band with someone named Greg. Both were given a weekly wage of £100 rather than recording contracts.

Strummer had been the band's principal lyricist, while Jones had written their music. After Jones was fired, the band assumed that anyone could write a punk song. This proved to be a mistake and, unknown to members of the Clash, Rhodes had already conceived his own solution to Jones's departure—he would take control of the music.

Strummer intended the second Clash line-up to encapsulate a back-to-basics approach to punk. The new musicians largely avoided the reggae-influenced style of their two previous studio albums, Sandinista! (1980) and Combat Rock (1982). Strummer began to refer to the line-up as "the Clash, Round Two", a phrase adopted by the press as "the Clash Mark II". They booked a short tour of the US West Coast, debuting new songs, which prompted Jones to boast to concert promoter Bill Graham that he was planning his own tour with Headon as "the Real Clash". Jones's lawyers had frozen the band's earnings from both the US Festival and sales of Combat Rock (1982). In response, Strummer wrote the song "We Are the Clash", which, along with "Three Card Trick", "Sex Mad Roar" and "This Is England", was debuted during live appearances in January 1984. In all, the Clash Mark II had written around 20 new songs before entering the studio to record what became the band's final studio album.

== Recording and production ==
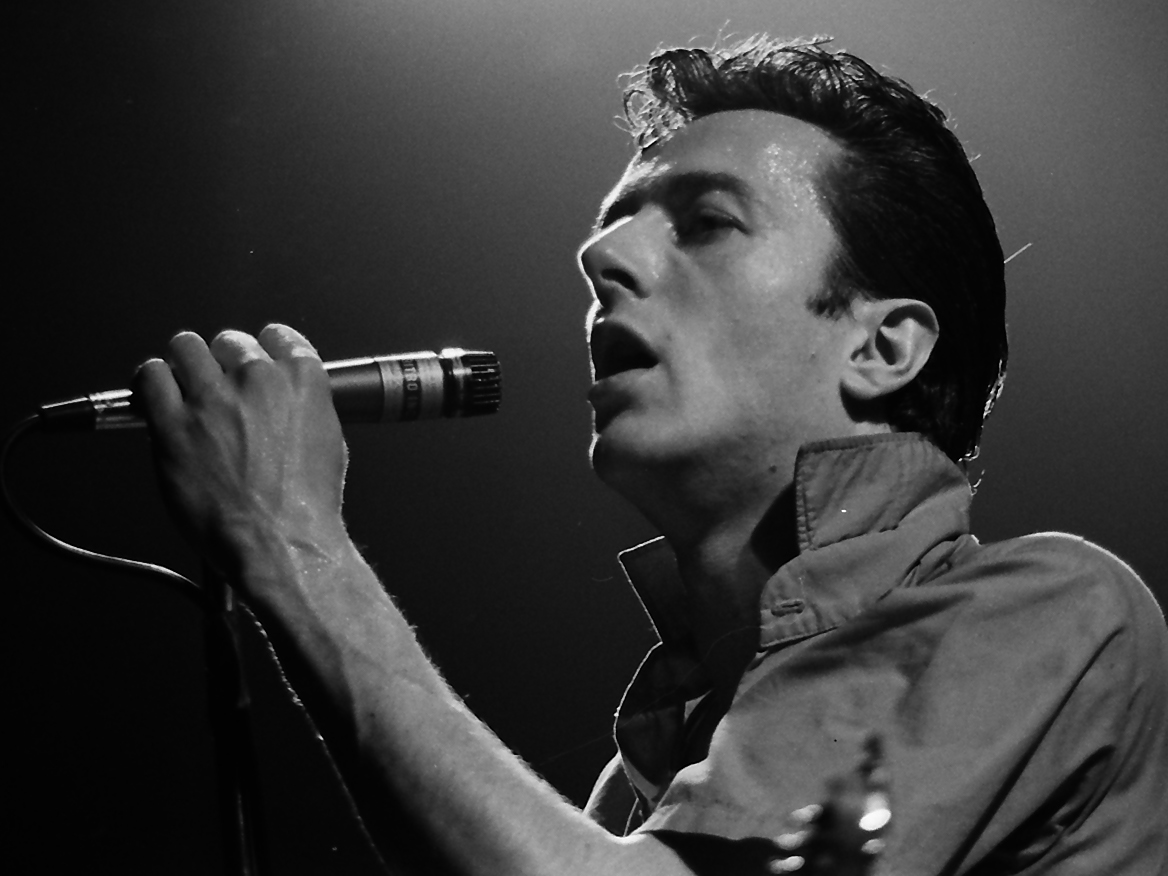
Joe Strummer performing live with the Clash at the Tower Theater in Upper Darby Township, Pennsylvania in 1980

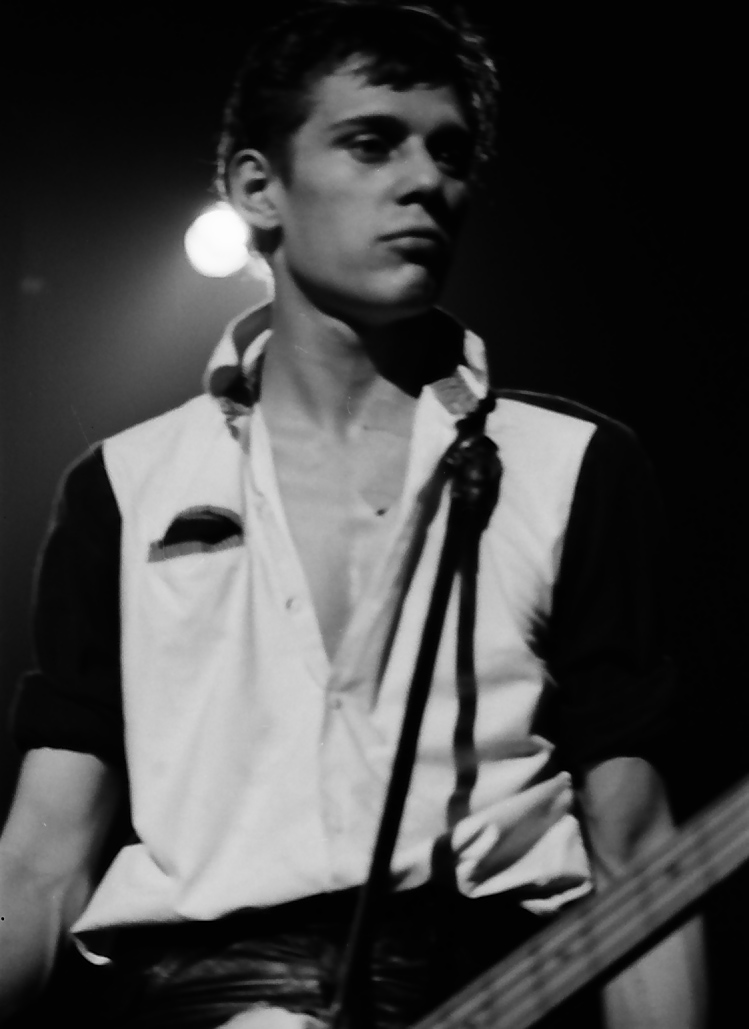
Paul Simonon at the Tower Theater in 1980. He does not appear on any of the album's final recordings.

The album was recorded between January and February 1985, on a 24-track mixing desk in Weryton Studios, Unterföhring, outside Munich, Germany, with some parts recorded in London. Epic Records chose the German studio because the band's finances were dependent on ongoing legal cases, including moves by Jones to prevent them recording under the name "the Clash". Rhodes hired engineer Micheal Fayne on the basis of affordability, and his prior experience with programmed drum machines, which Strummer wanted to use on the album because, according to Rhodes, "Joe wanted to compete with Mick's drum machine thing". Rhodes also employed engineers Ulrich A. Rudolf, Simon Sullivan and Kevin Whyte, who are credited on the sleeve.

Strummer and Rhodes disagreed on the direction of the recordings almost from the outset. Rhodes, credited on the sleeve under the pseudonym "Jose Unidos", had no previous experience with either songwriting or record production. While Strummer had been pleased with his demo versions, he fought against his manager over the album's production. Rhodes believed he had discovered a new genre, seeking to mix electro, hip hop and cut-up technique. He replaced live musicians with synthetic sounds and layered the tracks with audio from TV programs.

Fayne described Rhodes's treatment of Howard as "damaging". Rhodes would begin recording sessions by asking the drummer to play what he wanted, but would inevitably respond to Howard's parts by saying "no, not that", or "no, not that either". In one incident, Rhodes appeared in the recording room and began to "smash the drum kit up", at which point Howard stood up and left. Fayne said, "Bernie didn't want any connection with the past ... He wanted to take it forward, to control it, to mastermind the whole thing, and what they were doing was a bit too reminiscent of what it was". Disillusioned and lacking reinforcement or direction from Strummer, Howard seriously considered leaving the band at several points.

Most of the Clash and the production team liked the football-style chants used in some of the choruses. They were in part inspired by the communal sing-alongs the Clash performed during their busking tour the previous year, and thus evoked memories of a less tense period in their career. The massed vocals were provided by several dozen of their friends and families, and several of the inner team remembered those sessions as the only enjoyable period during the album's recording. The only other aspect that the musicians agreed on was the quality and commercial potential of "This Is England", a song into which Rhodes allowed the musicians significant creative input.

Rhodes suddenly ended the recordings and took the master tapes from the studio, after which he added further synthesizer parts. Although Jones's use of synthesizers and samplers was one of the main reasons behind his dismissal, those instruments brought him critical and public acclaim with his next band Big Audio Dynamite. When asked at the time for his opinion on the debut BAD album, Strummer described it as one of the "worst pieces of shit I have ever heard". In 1986, Strummer said that he had liked a few of the tunes but "really I hated it ... I didn't hear [the album as a whole] until it was in the shops." Strummer ultimately lost control of Cut the Crap! to Rhodes, and became so disillusioned that at one point he asked Jones to rejoin the band, but was refused.

Simonon does not appear on any of the final recordings; the basslines were performed by Norman Watt-Roy, former member of Ian Dury and the Blockheads, who was not credited on the sleeve. Howard's exclusion from the album has been lamented by many critics. Knowles described him as an "astonishingly powerful and prodigious" drummer, and said that replacing him with electronic percussion was "like replacing a Maserati with a Matchbox". Regretting the decision, Strummer later vowed to never use a drum machine again.

== Music and lyrics ==
The consensus among critics is that the album's production choices distract from otherwise strong songwriting by Strummer and Rhodes. Strummer's vocals are placed low in the mix, sometimes buried underneath electronic drums, synthetic keyboards and studio effects. The sound has often been described as muddy and cluttered due to multi-layered guitar tracks and backing vocals. Many of the guitar overdubs have been considered unnecessary, given that Sheppard and White were both using Gibson Les Pauls and as such their sounds were tonally similar, and there was not significant variation in either their chord progressions or riffs. Rhodes may have felt the need to fill each channel on the 24-track mixing desk. Author Gary Jucha summed up the album as having been produced by a manager whose musical ambitions were overstretched by a lack of experience.

The over-laid vocals in the choruses, which give the football chant feel, were harshly viewed by critics at the time, both because the effect seemed like low-brow rabble-rousing, and they compared unfavorably with Jones's earlier backing vocals. The drums are largely untreated with sound effects which left them sounding dull. (Note: Howard described the final drum sound as coming across as like somebody "hitting you over the head with a bag of ball bearings.") Knowles suggested that adding reverb would have helped to create a more organic "roomy" sound, so the songs wouldn't feel "so canned and phony". Against this, the live instrumentation is tight and cohesive. Each of the new recruits was a skilled musician, and they had just come off a tour during which Rhodes had instructed them not to vary song structures or guitar leads between performances.

=== Side one ===
"Dictator", one of the earliest songs the new line-up played during their European tour, has been described as "the poorest possible choice for the opening track". Music critic Lennox Samuels wrote in 1985 that the song is "a messy mix of horns and a Pink Floyd-like voice-over". The album cut omits the live version's bridge, changes the drum pattern, and replaces most of the guitar parts with atonal synth lines. The music journalist Martin Popoff described the lyrics' depiction of a Central American authoritarian as "surprisingly flat and dead". The critic Mark Andersen described it as "one of the less successful of the new tunes".

"Dirty Punk"
With its simple three-chord structure, "Dirty Punk" is the song that best represents Strummer and Rhodes's attempt to return the band to its punk rock origins.

The guitar-based "Dirty Punk" is built from a basic three-chord structure reminiscent of the band's self-titled debut studio album. White believed it should have been the lead single and could have been a hit. Although generally well received, critics dismissed its synthetic drum sound as at odds with its back-to-basics sound. The track was written just after the 1984 tour, when Strummer was attending to his terminally ill mother, so it is assumed that most of the lyrics were composed by Rhodes. They are written from the point of view of a young punk who feels overshadowed by an older brother, but the story is told in such simple terms that it has been characterised as having "Neanderthal lyrics that read as if a parody of a punk rock song". The relative simplicity of the lyrics were criticised by Vulture, who described them as akin to "Mick Jagger's '80s output, bland cliché for bland cliché".

The rallying cry lyrics for "We Are the Clash" are sometimes seen as a defiant response to Jones's lawsuit. The album version differs substantially from both earlier live recordings and a 1983 demo. It is more polished, the lyrics have been changed in parts, the tempo has been slowed down, the bridge changed to an intro and the call-and-response chorus removed. The song has received mixed reviews. It was criticised for its confused politics and thin sound, the guitar solo and back-in-the-mix vocal chants in particular lacking low-end frequencies. Vulture placed it last in its 2017 ranking of all 139 songs by the Clash from worst to best. (Note: The Vulture article gave the bottom ranking, out of all the Clash's recorded songs, to seven tracks from the album. In order of weakness, those tracks are "We Are the Clash" (139), "Play to Win" (138), "Fingerpoppin" (137), "Dictator" (136), "Dirty Punk" (135), "Are You Red..Y" (134), and "Movers and Shakers" (133). "This Is England" ranked highest from the album at number 71.) Rolling Stone took issue with the song's title, calling it "an outright lie" in light of the album's exclusion of both Jones and Headon. Music critic Tony Fletcher responded to the chant of "We Are the Clash" with the words "No you're not ... you're a pale imitation of Sham 69 at the disco". Clash biographer Chris Knowles disliked Rhodes's production but admired Strummer's songwriting, and considers the album version as a lost opportunity given that the song had been a "killer" live favourite.

"Are You Red..Y" had originally been titled "Are You Ready for War". "Cool Under Heat" is a reggae-ballad whose production choices have been criticised as cluttered and confused, several writers noting that its strong lyrics and tune are buried underneath a jumble of extraneous instruments and studio effects. The guitar sound is especially flat and restrained by overly compressed production. Popoff found the album version inferior to the Clash's live versions that were reminiscent of the Pogues, which the band had played on an early-1985 busking tour.

The opening line of "Movers and Shakers"—"The boy stood in the burning slum"—was described by writer Sean Egan as "a piece of unconscious self-parody that is quite probably the worst line ever to appear on a Clash record". Fletcher called the lyric "excruciating" given that Strummer was then a successful rock star, but resigned himself with the observation "fortunately for [him] not enough people were listening to be truly offended." Apart from the lyrics, the song's drum programming has often been criticised as clunky, although the vocal melody has been praised.

=== Side two ===
"This Is England"
"This Is England" has been described as the Clash's last great song, even though it is emblematic of the album's maligned production characteristics, especially in its use of synthesizers and chanted choruses.

"This Is England" opens side two, and is widely regarded as the album's stand-out track. It was released as the band's last single and Strummer himself called it the "last great Clash song". Co-written by Strummer and Rhodes, the song retains some of the reggae influences of their earlier albums. Like "We Are the Clash", its chorus is sung in a football chant, but here it is higher in the mix. The guitars are also prominent, but the percussion is again supplied by a drum machine. Lennox described it as a "tuneful, beautifully crafted overview of social decay in England, where political philosophies joust for hegemony while the country sinks into ignominious decline and millions of youths turn to the dole." The lyrics convey societal alienation, lamenting the national mood in 1985; the line "South Atlantic wind blows" refers to the Falklands War. Writing for Vulture in 2017, writer Bill Wyman described the song as the only successful track on Cut the Crap!, writing that "the sound collage and the gentle, troubled synth lines undergird the song unerringly, and for once the group-shouted chorus, though still over-loud, conveys some wan meaning. This can't have been a good time for Strummer, and you can hear it in his voice, as he sings the fuck out of this."

The production of the live favourite "Three Card Trick" has been praised as relatively uncluttered, although it does contain programmed hand-claps. Jucha said that the live version was good enough to have appeared on any Clash album, and that Strummer had developed a real skill for writing mid-tempo songs. The track begins as a straightforward punk song with a simple ska bassline.

Writer Mark Andersen described "Fingerpoppin'" and "Play to Win" as essentially B-side-quality songs that should have been excluded from the track listing. The latter is a sound collage which Popoff views as incoherent and basically "noise, bongos, and nonsensical fragmented conversations between Joe and Vince". Although the drums are considered too low in the mix, and the shouted choruses have been described as resembling Adam and the Ants, its demo version is considered superior.

The penultimate track "North and South" was written and sung by Sheppard. It features a simple guitar line and uncluttered production, and has often been highlighted as one of the album's strongest tracks. The album closer, "Life Is Wild", is the only track which had not been played live before. Its chorus, stylistically akin to the punk subgenre Oi!, was described by Popoff as a "curious thumping party rocker that makes little sense" and begged the question why a songwriter of Strummer's ability would write "such banalities".

== Sleeve art and title ==
The album cover was conceived by Rhodes, who contracted Mike Laye to shoot the pictures. The artwork was sub-contracted to Eddie King and Jules Balme, the art director for Stiff Records, who had earlier overseen the covers for Sandinista! (1980) and Combat Rock (1982). It shows a punk, apparently King's brother, wearing a mohawk, black leather jacket and sunglasses—all markers of 1980s punk fashion. The image is rendered so that the portrait looks like a poster glued to a wall. A similar image appears on the 7-inch release of "This Is England". A lithograph of the cover is held by the Museum of Modern Art in New York, who attribute an "unknown designer".

Rhodes titled the album, taking the words "cut the crap" from a scene in the 1981 post-apocalyptic film Mad Max 2, when Mel Gibson's character, Max Rockatansky, insists on driving the oil tanker on which the settlers' survival depends: "Come on, cut the crap. I'm the best chance you've got." According to Jucha, the sentiment reflected the band's view of themselves in the mid-1980s: "the back-to-basics Clash, Round two—like the initial band of UK punk rockers—were going to eradicate the meaningless New Romantic bands dominating the British pop world. They were 'the best chance [the world's] got'." Nevertheless, the title is widely disliked; Jucha described it as "awful".

== Critical reception ==
Professional ratings
Review scores
Source	Rating
AllMusic	2/5 stars
Classic Rock	1/5 stars
The Encyclopedia of Popular Music	1/5 stars
The Great Rock Discography	4/10
MusicHound Rock	1.5/5 stars
NME	4/10
Q	2/5 stars
The Rolling Stone Album Guide	2/5 stars
Spin Alternative Record Guide	4/10
The Village Voice	B+

By the time the new "Mark II" line-up released Cut the Crap! on 4 November 1985, they were an accomplished live band, and had written and performed several songs that would appear on the final studio album; a few had been live favourites. On the strength of their recent gigs, the UK press were optimistically waiting for the album's release. Epic Records anticipated that both the three-year gap since Combat Rock (1982) along with their updated sound, would result in critical acclaim and high sales. In the promotional lead up, Strummer told journalist Richard Cook that he was not going to release any new material until he knew it could "last ten years". Most critics and fans were disappointed on its release—especially with its sound and production values, and the omission of stand-out live tracks "In the Pouring Rain" and "Ammunition", usually titled "Jericho" in contemporary bootleg recordings.

Cut the Crap! sold poorly compared to earlier Clash releases, reaching just number 16 in the UK charts and number 88 in the US. On release, British and American critics alike generally viewed the album in an unfavourable light. Melody Maker and NME both published sharply negative reviews, the latter of which was titled "No Way, Jose" in sarcastic reference to the "Jose Unidos" production credit. Reflecting the critical consensus at the time, Mike Laye—a writer, photographer and Clash insider—said the band should "just drop the 'Cut' from the title, because to me this [is] crap." Robert Christgau, a longtime champion of the Clash in the US, offered only restrained praise in a Village Voice review that alluded to the negative word-of-mouth and summarised most of the album as "stubborn and jolly and elegiac and together". Music journalist Richard Cromelin found the album's uptempo songs less effective than those on earlier Clash records, but concluded that Strummer's singing is compelling and "This Is England" and "North and South" make the record "more than passable".

The absence of Jones and Headon led many to regard it as a Joe Strummer solo album—an impression further solidified by Simonon's involvement being limited only to the pre-production stage. Its shortcomings were often attributed to Strummer's evident disillusionment with the group and the fact that he was grieving over the recent deaths of his parents. Joe Sasfy of The Washington Post wrote that the "revised version of the Clash sounds like a pale and ghostly facsimile of this once-great band"; he disliked the "[tiresome] garbled choruses" and he found that "Strummer's attempt to enliven them with horn charts creates an ungainly mess of a sound." Similarly, Richard Defendorf of the Orlando Sentinel described the record as a "sometimes embarrassingly anachronistic ... attempt to rekindle the Clash's punkish, militant energy." Music critic Liam Lacey was more favourable and concluded that, given the strength of "This Is England", "in its cheesily self-aggrandizing way, the new Clash may be on to something."

Cut the Crap! has been favourably reevaluated in some retrospective reviews, many praising Strummer's songwriting and vocal performance. The writer Jon Savage praised the album in his influential 1991 book on the history of punk, England's Dreaming, highlighting the "innovative use of rap rhythm and atmosphere". Yet its reputation as a failure, or at least as a lost opportunity, has endured. In 2002, Stephen Thomas Erlewine described "This Is England" as "surprisingly nervy" on a record that, in his view, is otherwise "formulaic, tired punk rock that doesn't have the aggression or purpose of early Clash records".

== Aftermath ==
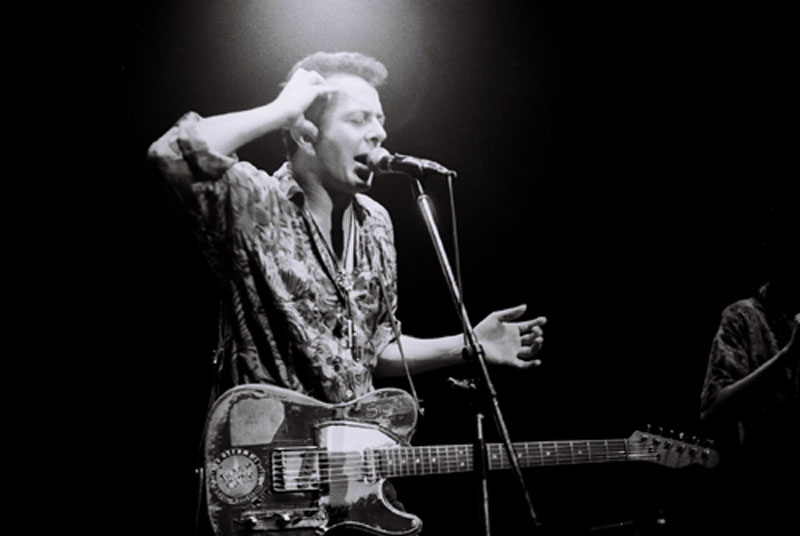
Strummer in concert, supporting the Pogues in Japan in 1992

Strummer was depressed by both the album's sound and critical appraisal. Asked in 1986 how the reviews affected him, he replied, "Sure I read [them] but I didn't need them to tell me. It was like when you're younger and you're trying to make a date with a girl but she won't have any of it. You keep going back, trying to fool yourself that this time will be better." He was particularly upset that people had thought the "Jose Unidos" pseudonym credited as a producer was him rather than Rhodes, and said "it wouldn't have been so bad if Bernie had just got the blame but that was unbearable." The album was cited by several contemporary reviewers as symptomatic of why punk rock had failed. Strummer said in 1988: "To someone who says I was ... 'the spokesman for your generation and you fucked it up', I say yeah, but we tried." He admitted that he had undertaken the project in part to prove that Jones had not been the Clash's only songwriter.

Epic Records intended a tour shortly after the release, but there were practical issues that made this impossible. Foremost, Strummer was in Spain and refusing to promote the record; he had even threatened to take legal action to prevent its release. After their treatment during the album's recording, White and Howard were reluctant to engage with the material. Finally, given that Rhodes had so heavily revised the original songs and used so many samples and studio effects, he and Strummer disagreed on how the tracks should be played live. Strummer dissolved the band that October, giving each of the remaining members a thousand pounds each as severance payments. Howard told him, somewhat bitterly, that "this is where it got you" for following Rhodes's lead—a statement to which he agreed.

Under pressure from Epic to get the band out on tour to promote the album, Rhodes asked the three remaining members to consider hiring a new singer, rationalising that "The Clash has always been an idea ... Now, how to take that idea to the next level!" (Note: Vic Godard believes that Rhodes was by then trying to take over the Clash's brand name, and would "have a version out there now touring" many years after Strummer left, if he could have legally managed it.) They briefly considered the possibility; Rhodes made the suggestion to Simonon, a position the bassist resolutely refused until Strummer officially disbanded the group. Strummer then reunited with Jones for Big Audio Dynamite's second studio album No. 10, Upping St. (1986), co-producing the album with him and writing five songs together.

Cut the Crap! was remastered and re-released in Europe in the mid-2000s, with the bonus track "Do It Now". The reissue was unannounced and not promoted. It came after the rest of the band's catalogue had been reissued between December 1999 and January 2000 in the US. The album was not mentioned in the Clash documentary The Clash: Westway to the World (2000) and was acknowledged only briefly in the official illustrated biography The Clash (2008), not receiving an overview as the first five studio albums had. The album has been omitted from many Clash compilations, box sets and reissues, including The Story of the Clash (1988), Clash on Broadway (1991), The Singles (1991), Sound System (2013) and 5 Album Studio Set (2013). (Note: "This Is England" was included on The Essential Clash (2003) and the 2007 box set reissue of The Singles.) According to Simonon, Cut the Crap! was excluded because it was not seen as a real Clash album, as neither Jones nor Headon were involved.

Director Shane Meadows in 2006 used the title This Is England for his film and TV show centering on young skinheads and Oi! punks in England in the 1980s, in reference to the Cut the Crap! song.

== Track listing ==
The liner notes credit all songs to Strummer and Rhodes.

Side one

No.	Title	Length
1.	"Dictator"	3:00
2.	"Dirty Punk"	3:11
3.	"We Are the Clash"	3:02
4.	"Are You Red..Y"	3:01
5.	"Cool Under Heat"	3:21
6.	"Movers and Shakers"	3:01

Side two

No.	Title	Length
1.	"This Is England"	3:49
2.	"Three Card Trick"	3:09
3.	"Play to Win"	3:06
4.	"Fingerpoppin'"	3:25
5.	"North and South"	3:32
6.	"Life Is Wild"	2:39

Bonus track

No.	Title	Length
1.	"Do It Now"	3:04

== Personnel ==
The Clash

- Joe Strummer – lead vocals; guitars
- Nick Sheppard – guitar; lead vocals on "North and South"
- Vince White – additional guitars
- Pete Howard – did not feature on album
- Paul Simonon – did not feature on album

Additional musicians

- Norman Watt-Roy – bass guitar
- Hermann Weindorf (as "Herman Young Wagner") – keyboards; synthesisers
- Michael Fayne – Yamaha RX-11 programming; vocals on "Play to Win"

Production

- Bernard Rhodes – producer (credited as "Jose Unidos")

== Charts ==
Chart performance for Cut the Crap!
Chart (1985–1986)	Peak position
Australian Albums (Kent Music Report)	69
Canada Top Albums/CDs (RPM)	64
Finnish Albums (The Official Finnish Charts)	20
New Zealand Albums (RMNZ)	35
Swedish Albums (Sverigetopplistan)	30
UK Albums (Official Charts)	16
US Billboard 200	88

== Certifications ==
Certifications for Cut the Crap
Region	Certification	Certified units/sales
United Kingdom (BPI)	Silver	60,000^{^}
^{^} Shipments figures based on certification alone.
