= From Here to Eternity: Live =

Live album by The Clash
- Released: 4 October 1999
- Recorded: 30 April 1978-13 October 1982 at various locations
- Genre: Punk rock
- Length: 63:47
- Label: Epic
- Producer: The Clash

The Clash compilation and live album chronology
Super Black Market Clash (1994)	From Here to Eternity: Live (1999)	The Essential Clash (2003)

From Here to Eternity: Live is a live album by English punk rock band the Clash, released on 4 October 1999 through Epic Records. The album's songs were selected from various Clash concerts between 1978 and 1982. Some of the recordings featured also appear in the film Rude Boy (1980). "London's Burning", "What's My Name" and "I Fought the Law" were overdubbed to repair some technical deficiencies of the original live recording.

The album comprises 17 songs, with a further two songs released as iTunes bonus tracks.

The title is a reference to the film From Here to Eternity starring Montgomery Clift, based on the novel by James Jones. Clift is the subject of the song "The Right Profile" from 1979's London Calling, although this song is not featured on the live album.

Professional ratings
Review scores
Source	Rating
AllMusic	4/5 stars
Blender	3/5 stars
Robert Christgau	(3-star Honorable Mention)
Pitchfork	7.4/10

== Track listing ==
All tracks are written by Joe Strummer and Mick Jones, except where noted.

No.	Title	Recorded	Length
1.	"Complete Control"	9 June 1981 at Bonds International Casino in New York City	3:45
2.	"London's Burning"	30 April 1978 at Victoria Park, East London	2:03
3.	"What's My Name" (written by Strummer, Jones, Keith Levene)	26 July 1978 at Music Machine in London	1:43
4.	"Clash City Rockers"	7 September 1982 at the Orpheum Theatre in Boston	3:30
5.	"Career Opportunities"	13 October 1982 at Shea Stadium in New York City	2:06
6.	"(White Man) In Hammersmith Palais"	7 September 1982 at the Orpheum Theatre in Boston	4:28
7.	"Capital Radio"	18 February 1980 at the Lewisham Odeon in London	2:58
8.	"City of the Dead"	3 January 1979 at the Lyceum Theatre, London	2:47
9.	"I Fought the Law" (written by Sonny Curtis)	28 December 1978 at the Lyceum Theatre, London	2:36
10.	"London Calling"	7 September 1982 at the Orpheum Theatre in Boston	3:29
11.	"Armagideon Time" (written by Willie Williams and Jackie Mittoo)	18 February 1980 at the Lewisham Odeon in London	5:05
12.	"Train in Vain"	9 June 1981 at Bonds International Casino in New York City	4:43
13.	"The Guns of Brixton" (written by Paul Simonon)	9 June 1981 at Bonds International Casino in New York City	3:36
14.	"The Magnificent Seven" (written by The Clash)	7 September 1982 at the Orpheum Theatre in Boston	6:09
15.	"Know Your Rights" (written by The Clash)	7 September 1982 at the Orpheum Theatre in Boston	4:04
16.	"Should I Stay or Should I Go" (written by The Clash)	8 September 1982 at the Orpheum Theatre in Boston	3:14
17.	"Straight to Hell" (written by The Clash)	8 September 1982 at the Orpheum Theatre in Boston	7:24
18.	"Drug-Stabbing Time" (iTunes bonus track)	3 January 1979 at the Lyceum Theatre, London	3:33
19.	"Janie Jones" (iTunes bonus track)	7 September 1982 at the Orpheum Theatre in Boston	2:46

== Personnel ==
- Mick Jones – lead guitar, vocals
- Paul Simonon – bass guitar, backing vocals, lead vocals and rhythm guitar on "The Guns of Brixton"
- Joe Strummer – vocals, rhythm guitar, bass guitar on "The Guns of Brixton"
- Topper Headon – drums (1977 – 1981)
- Terry Chimes – drums (1982)

Additional performers

- Micky Gallagher – organ on "Armagideon Time"
- Mikey Dread – additional vocals on "Armagideon Time"

Production

- The Clash – producers
- Crispin Murray – engineer
- Adrian Hall; Matt Lawrence; Gareth Ashton – assistant engineers
- Bill Price – mixing
- Tim Young – mastering
- Model Solutions – cover art
- Paul Simonon – art direction
- Solar Creative – graphic design
- Pennie Smith; Matthew Donaldson; Adrian Brown – photography

== Album notes ==
The liner notes also list a thanks to Rob Stringer, Hugh Attwooll, Paul Bursche, Matt Reynolds, Bruce Dickinson, Jock Elliot, Pennie Smith, Ollie Weait. "Special thanks to everybody all over the world that wrote in with their stories and recollections."

== Charts ==
Chart (1999)	Peak position
French Albums (SNEP)	17
Italian Albums (Musica e Dischi)	34
Scottish Albums (Official Charts)	18
Swedish Albums (Sverigetopplistan)	47
UK Albums (Official Charts)	13
US Billboard 200	193
