= This Is England (song) =

Single by the Clash

from the album Cut the Crap
- B-side: "Do It Now"; "Sex Mad Roar"
- Released: 30 September 1985
- Recorded: 1985
- Genre: Punk rock
- Length: 3:51; 3:37 (single edit)
- Label: CBS
- Songwriters: Joe Strummer; Bernard Rhodes
- Producer: 'Jose Unidos' (Bernard Rhodes)

The Clash singles chronology
"Should I Stay or Should I Go" / "Straight to Hell" (1982)	"This Is England" (1985)	"London Calling" (re-release) (1988)

Audio video
- "This Is England" on YouTube

"This Is England" is a song by the English rock band the Clash, released on 30 September 1985 by CBS Records as the lead and only single from their sixth and final studio album, Cut the Crap. Produced by Bernard Rhodes and co-written by Strummer and Rhodes, it was the band's last single in their later incarnation of Joe Strummer, Paul Simonon, Nick Sheppard, Pete Howard and Vince White.

== Composition ==
"This Is England" comprises a list of the problems in England during the early years of the Margaret Thatcher administration, addressing inner-city violence, urban alienation, life on council estates, high unemployment rate, England's dying motorcycle industry, racism, nationalism, and police corruption. Additionally, the song explores two very common subject matters for the mid-1980s left-wing songwriters: the wave of patriotism from the Falklands War in 1982 and the consumerist, subservient mindset of many English people at the time.

The lyrics are considered some of the strongest from Joe Strummer, which were overshadowed by the negative critical reception to Cut the Crap. The song features a drum machine and synthesizers, instruments which were mostly not utilised by the Clash during the Topper Headon and Mick Jones era. The song begins with the squeaky voice of a market hawker shouting, "Four for a pound, your face flannels; three for a pound, your tea towels!"

== Release ==
The single was released on 7-inch vinyl, backed with "Do It Now", and on 12-inch vinyl format with a different cover and an additional track on side two, titled "Sex Mad Roar". Strummer described "This Is England" as his "last great Clash song".

== Critical reception ==
John Leland of Spin wrote, "anthemic Brit power the likes of which we haven't heard in years (Billy Bragg notwithstanding). It's definitely a rocker, with a ballsy rhythm-guitar line and a football-chant chorus. Strummer is in peak psychotic/idealist form."

== Legacy ==
"This Is England" was included on The Essential Clash career-spanning greatest hits album in 2003. In 2006, the single was fully re-released on CD as disc 19 in Singles Box, accompanied by a faithful re-creation of the single's original artwork and the extra track "Sex Mad Roar" from the original 12-inch pressing. The single also appears on the compilation album The Singles (2007). "This is England" is also the only song from Cut the Crap to ever appear on compilation albums.

== Track listing ==
All tracks written by Joe Strummer and Bernard Rhodes.

7" vinyl

1. "This Is England" – 3:37
2. "Do It Now" – 3:07

12" vinyl

1. "This Is England" – 3:37
2. "Do It Now" – 3:07
3. "Sex Mad Roar" – 2:59

== Personnel ==
- Joe Strummer – lead vocals
- Paul Simonon – bass guitar, backing vocals
- Nick Sheppard – guitar, backing vocals
- Vince White – guitars
- Pete Howard – drums on "Do It Now" and "Sex Mad Roar"
- Bernard Rhodes – synthesisers, backing vocals, drums, sound effects

== Charts ==
Chart (1985)	Peak position
Australia (ARIA)	62
Ireland (IRMA)	13
New Zealand (Recorded Music NZ)	26
Sweden (Sverigetopplistan)	16
UK Singles (Official Charts)	24
