= 1977 Revisited =

Compilation album by The Clash
- Released: 1990
- Genre: Punk rock
- Length: 24:51
- Label: Relativity / CBS

The Clash compilations and lives chronology
The Story of the Clash, Volume 1 (1988)	1977 Revisited (1990)	Clash on Broadway (1991)

1977 Revisited – a Collection of Rare Tracks and B-Sides is a compilation CD by the Clash, released in the US in 1990 on Relativity Records via CBS Special Products and compiled by Anthony Valentino.

The CD contains four of the five songs that were deleted from the American edition of The Clash (excluding the original version of "White Riot"), two non-LP songs from The Cost of Living, three B-sides and a live song.

All songs except "London's Burning" later appeared on Clash on Broadway, and later all songs (including "London's Burning") appeared on the various singles in Singles Box.

The CD cover features a reprint of an article by Mick Farren originally published in Soho News while the insert contains a brief essay by Ira Robbins that describes the original sources of the track selection. Many of the songs released are considered original releases.

== Track listing ==
No.	Title	Length
1.	"1977"	1:41
2.	"London's Burning" (Live)	2:10
3.	"Deny"	3:01
4.	"Cheat"	2:03
5.	"48 Hours"	1:36
6.	"Protex Blue"	1:45
7.	"Groovy Times"	3:30
8.	"Gates of the West"	3:28
9.	"1–2 Crush on You"	2:59
10.	"Stop the World"	2:32
