= Yamaha RX-11 =

Drum machine

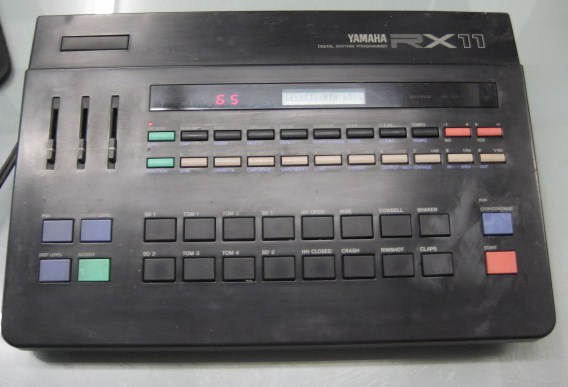
- Manufacturer: Yamaha
- Dates: 1984 - 1986
- Price: ¥137,000 JPY $895 USD.

Technical specifications
- Polyphony: 4 notes
- LFO: 1 modulator
- Synthesis type: PCM rompler
- Storage memory: 100 Patterns, 10 songs

Input/output
- Keyboard: 16 mini keys

The Yamaha RX-11 is a programmable digital sample-based drum machine built by Yamaha in 1984. It was the first drum machine that was made by Yamaha and the first drum machine from the RX series.

== Features ==
Yamaha released their first digital drum machines in 1984. These were the RX11 and RX15. The RX15 was a cut down version of the RX11, sharing some of the same sounds and features but missing out in key areas like individual outs.

== Typical sounds ==
The RX-11 holds 29 internal sounds stored in 6 ROMs of 256Kbit each. They include 8 snare drums, 3 bass drums, 2 rimshots, 2 open and 2 closed hi-hats, 4 tom drums, hi-hat pedal, 2 hand claps, 2 cowbells, cymbal ride and crash and shaker

== Notable users ==
- Erasure
- Кино
- Los Prisioneros
- New Order
- Nik Kershaw
- Aphex Twin
- They Might Be Giants

== See also ==
- Yamaha RX-5
