= Rob Harper =

English musician

- Born: 28 November 1955 (age 69)
- Origin: London, England
- Genres: Rock, punk rock, reggae, rock and roll
- Occupation: Musician
- Instrument(s): Guitar, bass guitar, drums
- Years active: 1976–present

Rob Harper (born 28 November 1955) is an English musician, noted for being an early drummer for The Clash from December 1976 until January 1977.

== Biography ==
Harper started out playing guitar in a college band and when the singer invited a guitarist called Mark Knopfler to join, Harper switched to the bass so that Knopfler could join on guitar. It was Knopfler's suggestion to name the band The Cafe Racers. After college, Harper went to Sussex University and at that time he was invited by Knopfler to play bass in the band that was to become Dire Straits. Harper declined his offer as he was concentrating on his studies at University.

During his year at Sussex University (he dropped out in mid 1976), he played in a band called The Rockettes, (as a lead guitarist) with William Broad (later to become Billy Idol) (vocals, rhythm guitar), Phil Siviter (drums) and Steve Upstone (bass).

In December 1976, Harper joined The Clash on the December 1976 "Anarchy Tour" supporting the Sex Pistols.

After the tour, Harper quit and the band replaced him with their original drummer, Terry Chimes, who was the drummer on the Clash's first album. Harper's drumming does not appear on any studio recordings, but can be heard on the 9 December 1976 bootleg recording of the Clash playing at the Electric Circus in Manchester.

Harper was for a time the guitarist in a South London R&B band called The Marauders, a band set up by UK Subs singer Charlie Harper. When The Marauders became the UK Subs in 1977 Harper switched to drums, alongside bassist Steve Slack. The pair left the UK Subs later in the year to form The Dazzlers.

Harper later formed a short-lived UK power pop band called The Dazzlers as a guitarist (he was equally proficient on guitar and bass in addition to drums). They released several singles (including "Lovely Crash" in 1979) and an LP produced by Tommy Ramone, although the band split up shortly before the album was released.
