= The Clash: Westway to the World =

- Directed by: Don Letts
- Produced by: Rick Elgood, Tricia Ronane
- Starring: Joe Strummer; Mick Jones; Paul Simonon; Topper Headon; Terry Chimes; Siouxsie Sioux; Shane MacGowan
- Edited by: Denes Ujvari
- Music by: The Clash
- Distributed by: 3DD Entertainment
- Release date: 2000
- Running time: 60 min. / 79 min. (director's cut)
- Country: United Kingdom
- Language: English

The Clash: Westway to the World is a 2000 documentary film about the British punk rock band the Clash. In 2003 it won the Grammy Award for Best Long Form Music Video.

Directed by Don Letts, the film combines old footage from the band's personal collection filmed in 1982 when the Clash went to New York City with new interviews conducted for the film by Mal Peachey of members Mick Jones, Paul Simonon, Topper Headon, and Joe Strummer and other people associated with the group (including founding drummer Terry Chimes). The Clash: Westway to the World provides an overview of the band's history, and implies that the Clash broke up in 1983 when Mick Jones left, making no mention of the post-Jones version of the Clash which existed between 1983 and 1986, nor the album that iteration produced (Cut the Crap). The band make the point in the film that creatively and spiritually Jones' leaving marked the end of the Clash. Strummer apologises on screen for sacking Jones and admits that it was a mistake. An unofficial documentary titled The Rise and Fall of The Clash covers the post-Jones period through interviews with latter-day Clash members Pete Howard, Nick Sheppard, and Vince White.

== Appearing ==
- Terry Chimes
- Terence Dackombe
- Topper Headon
- Mick Jones
- Jordan
- Paul Simonon
- Siouxsie Sioux
- Joe Strummer
- Shane MacGowan
- Dave Vanian
