= Bernard Rhodes =

English music manager

- Born: Bernard Rhodes; 1944 (age 81–82); London, England
- Occupations: Designer; band manager; record producer; songwriter
- Years active: 1960–present
- Website: bernardrhodes.com

Bernard Rhodes (born 1944) is a band manager, designer, studio owner, record producer and songwriter who was integral to the development of the punk rock scene in the United Kingdom from the middle 1970s. He is most associated with two of the UK's best known and influential punk bands, the Sex Pistols and the Clash. According to John Lydon, Rhodes was responsible for discovering him in the Kings Road and arranging the audition which led to his joining the Sex Pistols. Rhodes introduced Joe Strummer to Mick Jones and Paul Simonon, who with Keith Levene then formed the Clash.

Rhodes was an important force behind the Clash not only managing their business but also guiding their marketing and creative direction. Disagreement with the group about direction led to his sacking by the Clash in 1979. Rhodes meantime continued with other successful signings to his label Oddball Productions and major record companies. In 1981 singer Joe Strummer demanded his return to the Clash or he would quit the group.

Rhodes nurtured and managed other bands including Subway Sect, The Specials, Dexys Midnight Runners, Jo Boxers, the Lous, the Black Arabs, Twenty Flight Rockers, and Watts from Detroit. During this period Rhodes built and operated from his Camden studio Rehearsal Rehearsals, in what became Camden Market. The area around the studio became a well known hangout for punks and contributed to the growth of Camden as a hip area.

He is also known in Brazil for his friendship with Supla and baptising the band "Brothers of Brazil".

== Early life ==
Rhodes born in 1944 in Stepney, London. He says he never knew his father. He was placed in a Jewish orphanage in South London where he remained until he was 15. His mother worked long hours for Huntsman's tailors in Savile Row making suits for people like Cary Grant and later Hawes & Curtis where Rhodes' friend John Pearse who co-owned Granny Takes a Trip was her apprentice.

In the early 1960s Rhodes and Pearse shared a flat at 68 Hamilton Terrace, St Johns Wood, London. Mick Jagger, Marc Bolan, musician Mickey Finn, the Small Faces and Guy Stevens (who Rhodes later brought in to produce the Clash) were regular visitors.

== Early career ==
Towards the late 1960s Rhodes won a Design Council award for a children's educational toy he designed using newly developed plastic techniques. In the early 1970s Rhodes had a shop in the Antiquarius Market, Chelsea selling his hand printed silk screen designs on shirts and T-shirts, plus a selection of rare vintage reggae records.

During this period he became re-acquainted with an old friend, Malcolm McLaren and his girlfriend Vivienne Westwood who were operating out of Let It Rock boutique at 430 Kings Road. Finding they shared a similar philosophy, Rhodes and McLaren went into business collaborating on the T-shirts which were sold in the shop. Westwood wanted to expand the sleeveless T-shirt clothing line and Rhodes was an ideal colleague with his silk screen printing skill and whose 'complex meandering discourse threw up many new ideas'. The T-shirt 'You're Gonna Wake Up One Morning and Know What Side of The Bed You've Been Lying On' was created and printed by Rhodes and uses his handwriting. McLaren explained that Rhodes' idea was 'to create a dialogue'. Rhodes has described the difference between himself and McLaren: 'Malcolm [McLaren] likes to titillate but I get down to substance'.

== Sex Pistols ==
By 1975, SEX had become a hangout for a bunch of teenagers from whom the Sex Pistols would emerge. Rhodes took the group under his wing while McLaren was in New York looking after the New York Dolls. Original Sex Pistols member Glen Matlock describes Rhodes' contribution as making them understand the importance of being clear cut. "He (Rhodes) had a real ability for making people decide exactly what they were trying to do." John Lydon states that he was wearing a 'I Hate Pink Floyd' T-shirt when he was spotted by Rhodes on the Kings Road. Rhodes insisted he meet McLaren, Steve Jones and Paul Cook in the local Roebuck pub that evening. After this get-together, Rhodes had Lydon come back to the shop to audition for the role of singer. As a result, Lydon became lead singer of the group.

Lydon says that Rhodes 'was important to me in so many ways.... He would indicate to me where the problems with the Pistols would be in the future. He would sow a seed and then wait to see if I would pick up on it.'

== The Clash ==
After his offer to co-manage Sex Pistols was rejected by McLaren, Rhodes was instrumental in the Clash's formation in 1976. Mick Jones was wearing one of Rhodes' Wake Up T-shirts when he approached Rhodes after a Sex Pistols gig thinking he was a keyboard player. They started talking about groups and the relationship was the starting point for what would eventually become the Clash.

Strummer credits Rhodes as his mentor, stating "He constructed the Clash and focused our energies and we repaid him by being really good at what we did". Rhodes told them to write about social issues occurring at the time, i.e., the housing problems, lack of education, dead-end futures. Strummer said that Rhodes was the only one who understood how one should go about getting known.

Paul Simonon stated that Rhodes "set up the whole punk scene basically. He saw how non-musicians like myself and John (Lydon) could contribute". Rhodes called his friend Guy Stevens in, to produce the Polydor recordings in 1977. The group later used Stevens to produce London Calling. He also sought out Lee 'Scratch' Perry to produce the single "Complete Control".

On 25 January 1977, Rhodes signed the Clash to CBS Records with CBS Records UK chairman Maurice Oberstein who promised to allow the group to do what they wanted on record and CBS would promote it. After a couple of albums, including their first, which Rhodes helped produce with Mickey Foote, he felt the group were drifting away from their street ideals and they parted company in late 1978.

== 1979–1981 ==
From his Rehearsal Rehearsals studio, Rhodes nurtured and managed groups Subway Sect, the Specials, Dexys Midnight Runners, JoBoxers, the Black Arabs and other musical projects. The intro to the Specials' version of "Gangsters" released in 1979 begins with the line: "Bernie Rhodes knows: don't argue!". Dexys Midnight Runners' single "Dance Stance" was released in 1979 on the Oddball Productions label owned by Rhodes. He later signed the group to EMI Records.

The first album by Subway Sect, What's the Matter Boy, was produced by Rhodes and released by Oddball in 1980. Rhodes also introduced the idea of using a Burundi drum beat to Malcolm McLaren who gave it to Adam Ant. This led to the sound of Kings of the Wild Frontier (1980) by Adam and the Ants.

== Club Left ==
During the late seventies he opened Club Left in Wardour Street Soho. Club Left performances included Dig Wayne, Anne Pigalle, Tom Cat, Lady Blue, Johnny Britton, Sade, Bananarama, Georgie Fame and Slim Gaillard. The regular house band was Vic Godard and the Subway Sect.

Sean McLusky said that Rhodes gave him a break at Club Left in 1981 and then got a deal and success for his band JoBoxers, who enjoyed mainstream success on both sides of the Atlantic with their single "Just Got Lucky". McLusky says, "Bernard never got the credit for things that were his. He has been the undefined force".

== Return to the Clash ==
Strummer said if Rhodes did not come back and manage the Clash he would quit. Once back, Rhodes decided to remix "Magnificent 7". A 12" single dance remix "Magnificent Dance" was released on 12 April 1981. Production was credited to 'Pepe Unidos', a pseudonym for Strummer, Rhodes and Paul Simonon. Pepe Unidos also produced "The Cool Out", a re-mix of "The Call Up".

== Bond's, NYC ==
Mick Jones said "Bernie came back on the scene because people thought that we'd gotten out of control and the first thing he wanted to do was book us for seven nights in New York." The residency at Bond International Casino in the first two weeks of June 1981 was organised by Rhodes on his return as manager of the Clash. Support acts included Grandmaster Flash, The Sugarhill Gang, Dead Kennedys, Bad Brains, Texan bad boy Joe Ely, Lee Perry and Funkapolitan. Rhodes states that it was because of these Bonds NYC shows that the public became more interested in hip hop. "I endeavoured to get these guys on like Grandmaster Flash, not that most of the audience liked them but that led to a helluvalot." The record company were not behind the triple album Sandinista! recorded in Rhodes's absence but Kosmo Vinyl states that with the Bonds NYC residency, the Clash "clawed their way back into the Premiership."

== Jones' sacking ==
Paul Simonon states that Rhodes was not aware he and Strummer were going to sack Mick Jones nor was he in favour of that action. (The sacking took place in 1983). However, Simonon says Jones did not know this until the Rock and Roll Hall of Fame induction after Strummer's death.

== "This Is England" ==
The Clash's last album, Cut the Crap (1985), (originally Out of Control) was produced by Rhodes under the name of 'Jose Unidos'. He also co-wrote all of the songs with Strummer.

The standout track, "This Is England", was co-written by Strummer and Rhodes and described by Strummer as the "last great Clash song". Critic Samuels Lennox described it as a "tuneful, beautifully crafted overview of social decay in England, where political philosophies joust for hegemony while the country sinks into ignominious decline and millions of youths turn to the dole." In 2017, the journalist Bill Wyman praised Rhodes' production, writing that his "sound collage and the gentle, troubled synth lines undergird the song unerringly, and for once the group-shouted chorus, though still over-loud, conveys some wan meaning."

The song has inspired many other artists, including Shane Meadows who used the title for his movie and TV show centering on young skinheads and Oi! punks in England in the 1980s, in reference to the song.

== Watts ==
In 1990, Rhodes relocated from Los Angeles to Atlanta, Georgia, where Doug Watts, lead singer of the band Naked Truth, asked him for help. Rhodes brought in a new bass player (the English based Kwame Boaten, previously in the band Sons of Ham), and rehearsed the band over several months. He independently produced the album Green with Rage, and secured a deal for the band with Sony Records.

== Recent ==
In 2014 Rhodes designed a range of biker T-shirts for Lewis Leathers, Britain's oldest motorcycle clothing company.

In May 2016, the British Library invited him to give a talk entitled Me, Punk and the World as part of its Punk 1976-78 exhibit.

Rhodes launched the website cancerclash.com in June 2022 to "dynamically demystify the world of cancer" and provide a cultural space to deal with the impact of the disease. Rhodes was diagnosed with cancer in 2016.

== Sources ==
=== Books ===
- Clash, The (2008). The Clash. London: Atlantic Books. ISBN 978-1-84354-788-4.
- Coon, Caroline (1977). 1988: The New Wave Punk Rock Explosion. London: Hawthorn. ISBN 0-8015-6129-9. OCLC 79262599. Archived from the original on 26 October 2007.
- Gilbert, Pat (2005) [2004]. Passion Is a Fashion: The Real Story of The Clash (4th ed.). London: Aurum Press. ISBN 1-84513-113-4. OCLC 61177239.
- Gruen, Bob (2001). The Clash Photographs by Bob Gruen. London: Omnibus Press. ISBN 1-903399-34-3.
- Gray, Marcus (2005) [1995]. The Clash: Return of the Last Gang in Town (5th revised ed.). London: Helter Skelter. ISBN 1-905139-10-1. OCLC 60668626.
- Jucha, Gary. The Clash FAQ: All That's Left to Know About the Clash City Rockers. Milwaukee, WI: Backbeat Books, 2016. ISBN 978-1-4803-6450-9
- Knowles, Chris (2003). Clash City Showdown. London: PageFree. ISBN 978-1-5896-1138-2.
- Letts, Don (2007). Culture Clash: Dread Meets Punk Rockers. London: SAF Publishing Ltd. ISBN 978-0-946719-89-1.
- Lydon, John (1993). Rotten:No Irish, No Blacks, No Dogs. London: Hodder & Stoughton. ISBN 0-340-63528-2.
- Popoff, Martin. The Clash: All the Albums, All the Songs. London: Voyageur Press, 2018. ISBN 978-0-7603-5934-1
- Savage, Jon (1991). England's Dreaming: Sex Pistols and Punk Rock. London: Faber & Faber. ISBN 978-0571227204.
- Strongman, Phil (2008) [2007]. Pretty Vacant: A History of UK Punk (US ed.). Chicago: Chicago Review Press. ISBN 978-1-55652-752-4. OCLC 173299117.
- Topping, Keith (2004) [2003]. The Complete Clash (2nd ed.). Richmond: Reynolds & Hearn. ISBN 1-903111-70-6. OCLC 63129186.
- Vermorel, Fred & Judy (1987) [1978]. Sex Pistols The Inside Story (3rd ed.). London: Omnibus Press. ISBN 9780711-910904.
- Westwood & Kelly, Vivienne & Ian (2014). Vivienne Westwood. London: Picador. ISBN 9781-44-7254126.
- White, Vince (2007). Out of Control: The Last Days of "The Clash". London: Moving Target Books. ISBN 978-0-9555-0380-1.

=== Films and documentaries ===
- Letts Don; Rick Elgood, Joe Strummer, Mick Jones, Paul Simonon, Topper Headon, Terry Chimes, The Clash (2001). The Clash: Westway to the World (DVD). New York, NY: Sony Music Entertainment; Dorismo; Uptown Films. ISBN 0-7389-0082-6. OCLC 49798077.
