= The Essential Clash =

Greatest hits album by The Clash
- Released: 11 March 2003 (U.S.); 22 April 2003 (UK)
- Recorded: 1977–1985
- Genres: Punk rock, post-punk, new wave
- Length: Disc one: 60:01; Disc two: 76:03
- Label: Epic E2K 89056
- Producers: The Clash, Micky Foote, Sandy Pearlman, Bill Price, Guy Stevens, Jose Unidos

The Clash compilations and lives chronology
From Here to Eternity: Live (1999)	The Essential Clash (2003)	Singles Box (2006)

The Essential Clash is a career-spanning greatest hits album by the Clash first released in 2003. It is part of the ongoing 'The Essential' Sony BMG compilation series. The album is dedicated to Joe Strummer, who died during its compilation.

== Reception ==
Professional ratings
Review scores
Source	Rating
AllMusic	4.5/5 stars
The Music Box	(5/5)
NME	(10/10)
Pitchfork	(10/10)
Rolling Stone	5/5 stars

- Spin (6/03, p. 104) – "These two discs are a pretty hot crib sheet....The first 11 cuts are a shuffle mix of highlights from the U.S. and U.K. versions of 1977's incendiary The Clash, and if they don't inspire you to punch holes in the plaster, you're too well-adjusted."
- Uncut (5/03, p. 114) – 4 stars out of 5 – "They never lost sight of Britain's strange mix of supermarket torpor and multicultural high energy."
- Charlotte Robinson on Popmatters says that: Given its breadth, however, The Essential Clash will probably be the preferred collection of most listeners.

== Track listing ==
=== Disc one ===
- All songs written by Joe Strummer and Mick Jones, except where noted.
1. "White Riot" – 1:59
2. "London's Burning" – 2:10
3. "Complete Control" – 3:13
4. "Clash City Rockers" (original version) – 3:56 (on UK release the sped up single version is used)
5. "I'm So Bored with the U.S.A." – 2:25
6. "Career Opportunities" – 1:52
7. "Hate & War" – 2:05
8. "Cheat" – 2:06
9. "Police & Thieves" – 6:00 (Junior Murvin, Lee "Scratch" Perry)
10. "Janie Jones" – 2:05
11. "Garageland" – 3:13
12. "Capital Radio One" – 2:09
13. "(White Man) In Hammersmith Palais" – 4:01
14. "English Civil War" – 2:36 (traditional, arranged by Jones and Strummer)
15. "Tommy Gun" – 3:17
16. "Safe European Home" – 3:51
17. "Julie's Been Working for the Drug Squad" – 3:04 (uncredited Piano by Allen Lanier)
18. "Stay Free" – 3:40
19. "Groovy Times" – 3:30
20. "I Fought the Law" – 2:39 (Sonny Curtis)

UK version adds "1977" – 1:41 as track 2.

=== Disc two ===
- All tracks written by The Clash, except where noted.
1. "London Calling" – 3:20 (Jones, Strummer)
2. "The Guns of Brixton" – 3:10 (Paul Simonon)
3. "Clampdown" – 3:50 (Jones, Strummer)
4. "Rudie Can't Fail" – 3:29 (Jones, Strummer)
5. "Lost in the Supermarket" – 3:47 (Jones, Strummer)
6. "Jimmy Jazz" – 3:55 (Jones, Strummer)
7. "Train in Vain (Stand by Me)" – 3:11 (Jones, Strummer)
8. "Bankrobber" – 4:35 (Jones, Strummer)
9. "The Magnificent Seven" – 5:33
10. "Ivan Meets G.I. Joe" – 3:07
11. "Police on My Back" – 3:17 (Eddy Grant) (UK release replaces this recording with "Broadway" – 4:56, between "The Street Parade" and "This is Radio Clash")
12. "Stop the World" – 2:33
13. "Somebody Got Murdered" – 3:34
14. "The Street Parade" – 3:29
15. "This Is Radio Clash" – 4:10 (on US release this recording is the B-side "Radio Clash (remix)", not the A-side "This Is Radio Clash")
16. "Ghetto Defendant" – 4:44
17. "Rock the Casbah" – 3:42
18. "Straight to Hell" – 5:30
19. "Should I Stay or Should I Go" – 3:08
20. "This Is England" – 3:50 (Bernard Rhodes, Strummer)

== DVD ==
=== Track listing ===
1. Clash on Broadway Trailer including "London Calling" and "Radio Clash"
2. "White Riot"
3. "Complete Control"
4. "Tommy Gun"
5. "Clampdown"
6. "Train in Vain"
7. "London Calling"
8. "Bankrobber"
9. "The Call Up"
10. "Rock the Casbah"
11. "Should I Stay or Should I Go?" (live)
12. "Career Opportunities" (live)

=== Special features ===
- Hell W10 – written and directed by Joe Strummer. Filmed in black and white during the winter of early 1983.
- Promo Footage (1976) – including "1977", "White Riot" and "London's Burning"
- Discography
- "I Fought the Law" (Live, from the film Rude Boy)
- Interview clip (London Weekend Show 1976)

=== Credits ===
- All videos directed by Don Letts except "Tommy Gun" directed by Keef & Co and "White Riot" directed by Lindsey Clinell.
- Hell W10 soundtrack features excerpts from; "Version City", "Rudie Can't Fail", "First Night Back in London (Instrumental)", "Know Your Rights (Instrumental)", "Long Time Jerk (Instrumental)", "Cool Confusion (Instrumental)", "Ghetto Defendant (Instrumental)", "Junco Version (Instrumental)", "Atom Tam (Instrumental)", "Silicone on Sapphire", "Wrong 'Em Boyo", "Overpowered by Funk (Instrumental)", "The Call Up", "Red Angel Dragnet (Instrumental)", "Jimmy Jazz", "Mensforth Hill", "Junkie Slip", "Time Is Tight", "Armagideon Time", "Listen", "The Equaliser", "Police on My Back", "One More Dub", "Rock the Casbah (Instrumental)".

== Charts ==
Chart (2003)	Peak position
Australian Albums (ARIA)	76
Canadian Alternative Albums (Nielsen Soundscan)	31
New Zealand Albums (RMNZ)	50
Scottish Albums (Official Charts)	17
Swedish Albums (Sverigetopplistan)	22
UK Albums (Official Charts)	18
UK Rock & Metal Albums (Official Charts)	4
US Billboard 200	99

== Certifications ==
Region	Certification	Certified units/sales
United Kingdom (BPI)	Gold	100,000^{^}
^{^} Shipments figures based on certification alone.
