= Capital Radio (song) =

Song and album by the Clash

Song by the Clash

from the EP Capital Radio
- Released: 9 April 1977 (UK)
- Recorded: 10–27 February 1977
- Studio: CBS, London
- Genre: Punk rock
- Length: 2:09
- Label: Neat
- Songwriters: Joe Strummer; Mick Jones
- Producer: Mickey Foote

"Capital Radio" is a song and an extended play by the English rock band the Clash. The original song has been included as "Capital Radio" or "Capital Radio One" on the Capital Radio EP (1977), Black Market Clash (1980), The Story of the Clash, Volume 1 (1988), Clash on Broadway (1991), From Here to Eternity: Live (1999), The Essential Clash (2003), and Singles Box (2006).

== Lyrics ==
Lyrically, the song is an attack on the music policy of what was (at the time) London's only legal commercial music radio station, which played sophisticated pop, some mainstream chart hits but little punk, though they did playlist The Jam's first single, "In The City", while The Sex Pistols' "Pretty Vacant" made the Top 3 of their "Capital Countdown" playlist. The Clash song mentions the station's then-Head of Music, Aidan Day – "He picks all the hits they play/to keep you in your place all day":

They're even worse because they had the chance, coming right into the heart of London and sitting in that tower right on top of everything. But they've completely blown it. I'd like to throttle Aidan Day. He thinks he's the self appointed Minister of Public Enlightenment. We've just written a new song called Capital Radio and a line in it goes "listen to the tunes of the Dr Goebbels Show". They say "Capital Radio in tune with London". Yeah, yeah, yeah! They're in tune with Hampstead. They're not in tune with us at all. I hate them. What they could have done compared to what they have done is abhorrent. They could have made it so good that everywhere you went you took your transistor radio – you know, how it used to be when I was at school. I'd have one in my pocket all the time or by my ear'ole flicking it between stations. If you didn’t like one record you'd flick to another station and then back again. It was amazing. They could have made the whole capital buzz. Instead Capital Radio has just turned their back on the whole youth of the city.

The song ends with a parody of one of Capital's actual jingles of the period; the band replaces the lyric "in tune with London" with "in tune with nothing". The parody is heightened by the use of a variation on the ending riff from "I'm Only Dreaming" by the Small Faces.

== Capital Radio E.P. ==
Capital Radio

EP by the Clash
- Released: 9 April 1977 (UK)
- Recorded: 10–27 February 1977
- Studios: CBS, London
- Genre: Punk rock
- Length: 14:36
- Label: Neat
- Producer: Mickey Foote

The Clash EPs chronology
| ''Capital Radio'' (1977) | The Cost of Living (1979) |

The extended play Capital Radio was released on 9 April 1977, but was not sold commercially. Instead, it was given away free to readers who sent off a coupon printed in the NME, plus the red sticker found on the band's debut studio album, The Clash (1977). The EP was produced by Mickey Foote and engineered by Simon Humphrey. The interview with the band was conducted by the NME's writer Tony Parsons and was recorded during a trip on a London Underground train on the Circle line.

=== Track listing ===
All tracks are written by Joe Strummer and Mick Jones.

Side one
| No. | Title | Length |
|---|---|---|
| 1. | "Listen" (excerpt) | 0:27 |
| 2. | "Interview with the Clash on the Circle Line (Part 1)" | 8:50 |

Side two
| No. | Title | Length |
|---|---|---|
| 3. | "Interview with the Clash on the Circle Line (Part 2)" | 3:10 |
| 4. | "Capital Radio" | 2:09 |
| Total length: | | 14:37 |

=== Personnel ===
==== "Capital Radio" ====
- Joe Strummer – lead vocal, rhythm guitar
- Mick Jones – backing vocals, lead & rhythm guitar
- Paul Simonon – bass guitar
- Terry Chimes – drums

==== "Listen" ====
- Mick Jones – lead guitars
- Joe Strummer – lead guitar
- Paul Simonon – bass guitar
- Terry Chimes – drums

== Capital Radio Two ==
"Capital Radio Two"

Song by the Clash

from the EP The Cost of Living
- Released: 11 May 1979
- Recorded: 1979
- Genre: Punk rock
- Length: 3:19
- Label: CBS
- Songwriters: Joe Strummer; Mick Jones
- Producer: Bill Price

By late 1978, the original EP had become very rare in the UK, and started to be sold for high prices by collectors and some unscrupulous record shops. Partly to prevent this profiteering from what they had originally intended as a free gift to fans, the group decided to re-record "Capital Radio" for a new extended play record, The Cost of Living, which was released on 7-inch vinyl on 11 May 1979 through CBS Records. This new version, later titled "Capital Radio Two", is longer (3:19) than the original version, mainly because of a protracted intro and outro. "Capital Radio Two" has been included on Super Black Market Clash (1994) and Singles Box (2006), whereas "Capital Radio One" was included on the original version of the former, Black Market Clash.

=== Personnel ===
- Joe Strummer – lead vocal, rhythm guitar
- Mick Jones – backing vocals, lead & rhythm guitars
- Paul Simonon – bass guitar
- Topper Headon – drums
