= Bond International Casino =

Coordinates: 40.75766°N 73.98559°W

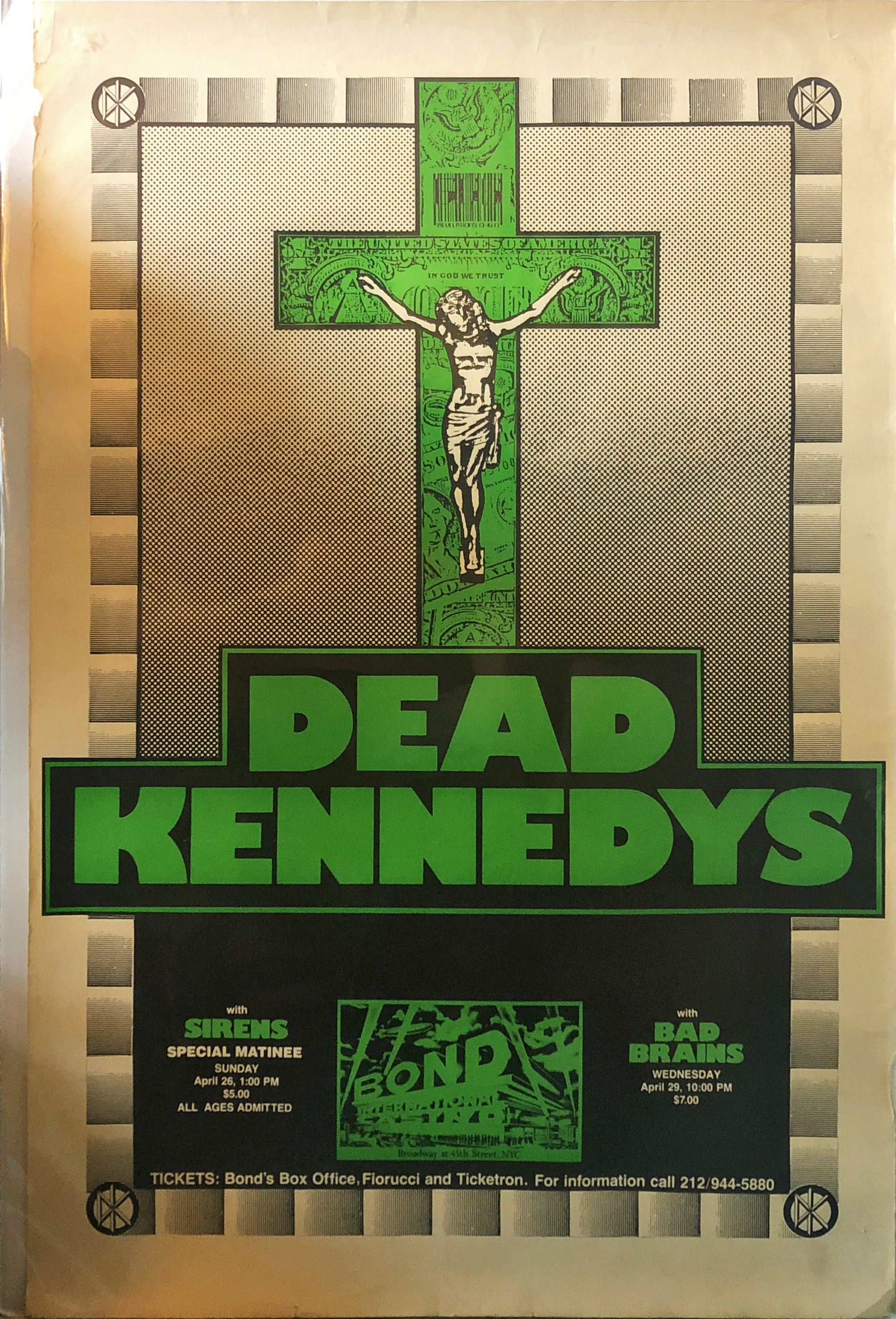
Dead Kennedys at Bond International Casino April 1981

International Casino menu dated October 17, 1937

Bond International Casino (sometimes called "Bond's") was a nightclub and music venue located on the east side of Broadway between 44th and 45th Streets near Times Square, New York City.

The venue operated as the International Casino in the 1930s, a popular dinner club (not a gambling house). The club closed by 1940, the vacant location later converted to Bond Clothes, a men's clothing emporium.

Starting in 1980, the location again operated as a nightclub, merging the names of the two previous businesses as Bond International Casino, with co-owner, Maurice Brahms, who later co-owned Underground at 860 Broadway. The new venue had a capacity of 1,800 people. Notable 1980s performers included Blue Öyster Cult, Grace Jones, Blondie, The Plasmatics, Slave, The Dead Kennedys and The Clash.

The space was completely remodeled and reopened in 1988 as the Criterion Center, a pair of live theatre venues, with the larger being a Tony Award-eligible theatre; in 1991 the venues were leased to the Roundabout Theatre Company, which used them until 1999, when the building was completely gutted to make room for a flagship Toys R Us store.
