= Nick Sheppard =

English guitarist

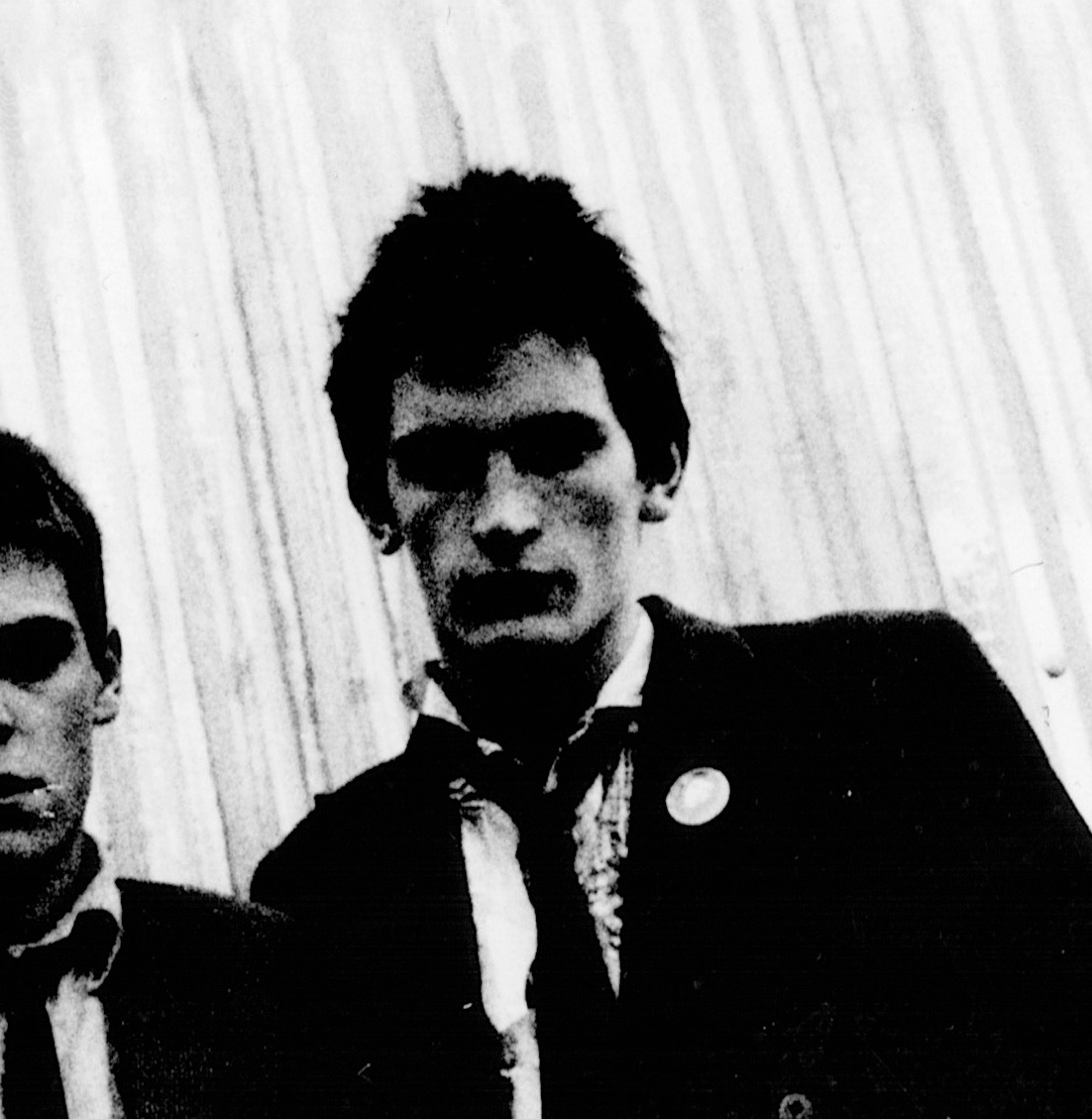
- Sheppard with the Cortinas in 1977

Background information
- Born: 28 November 1960 (age 65); Bristol, England
- Genres: Rhythm and blues; rock; punk rock
- Occupation: Guitarist
- Years active: 1976–present
- Formerly of: The Clash

Nick Sheppard (born 28 November 1960) is an English guitarist. He played lead guitar for the Clash from 1983 until the band's breakup in 1986.

== Life and career ==
Sheppard was educated at Bristol Grammar School, one of Bristol's private schools, and was in the same year as fellow musician Mark Stewart of the Pop Group. He started at 16 with the Cortinas, named after the Ford Cortina automobile. The band moved from R&B towards covering songs by punk forerunners like the New York Dolls and the Stooges. "In retrospect, I suppose we were very hip," Sheppard says. "We were listening to the right records, as we were right there at the right time." The Cortinas' singles, "Fascist Dictator" and "Defiant Pose" both appeared on Step Forward, the label run by Police manager Miles Copeland, their only album "True Romances" being released on CBS. The band split up in September 1978, after which Sheppard played in a number of bands, including the Viceroys and the Spics, a Bristol-based big band.

Sheppard moved to California, then back to Britain. When the Clash sacked Mick Jones in 1983, Sheppard and Vince White replaced him, and he toured America and Europe with them in 1984, playing on their final album Cut the Crap. The album attracted criticism through manager Bernie Rhodes' intrusive production and use of a drum machine. When "This Is England" reached a number 24 in the UK Singles Chart, Sheppard is quoted as saying: "I remember sitting in a different city watching it, thinking, 'There isn't a band'". The Clash finally split up shortly afterwards.

From 1986 to 1989 he collaborated with Gareth Sager (formerly of the Pop Group and Rip Rig + Panic) in Head, but their three albums made little impact. Sheppard next worked with Koozie Johns in Shot, which signed with I.R.S. Records in 1991, with Copeland as manager; the band's recordings were never released.

Sheppard moved to Perth, Australia in 1993, and has formed/played in two local bands, Heavy Smoker and the New Egyptian Kings with Shakir Pichler. Sheppard owns the Elroy clothing store on Beaufort Street in Mount Lawley.

In 2007 Sheppard formed the DomNicks with Dom Mariani, together with bass player Howard Shawcross and drummer Marz Frisina. This combo play a mix of Mariani and Sheppard originals with a spread of 1960s and 1970s garage rock and soul material. In 2009 they released an EP, Hey Rock 'n' Roller, which was produced by Wayne Connolly. The DomNicks toured with the Hoodoo Gurus and performed in Sydney and Melbourne at the Joe Strummer tribute concert, 'Revolution Rock'. In 2013 he flew to Melbourne to reunite with Shakir Pichler to be special guest guitarist in a tribute to Joe Strummer by playing in the music video for "Complete Control" The Clash by Melbourne punk band "The Terraces".
