= The Clash =

English punk rock band (1976–1986)

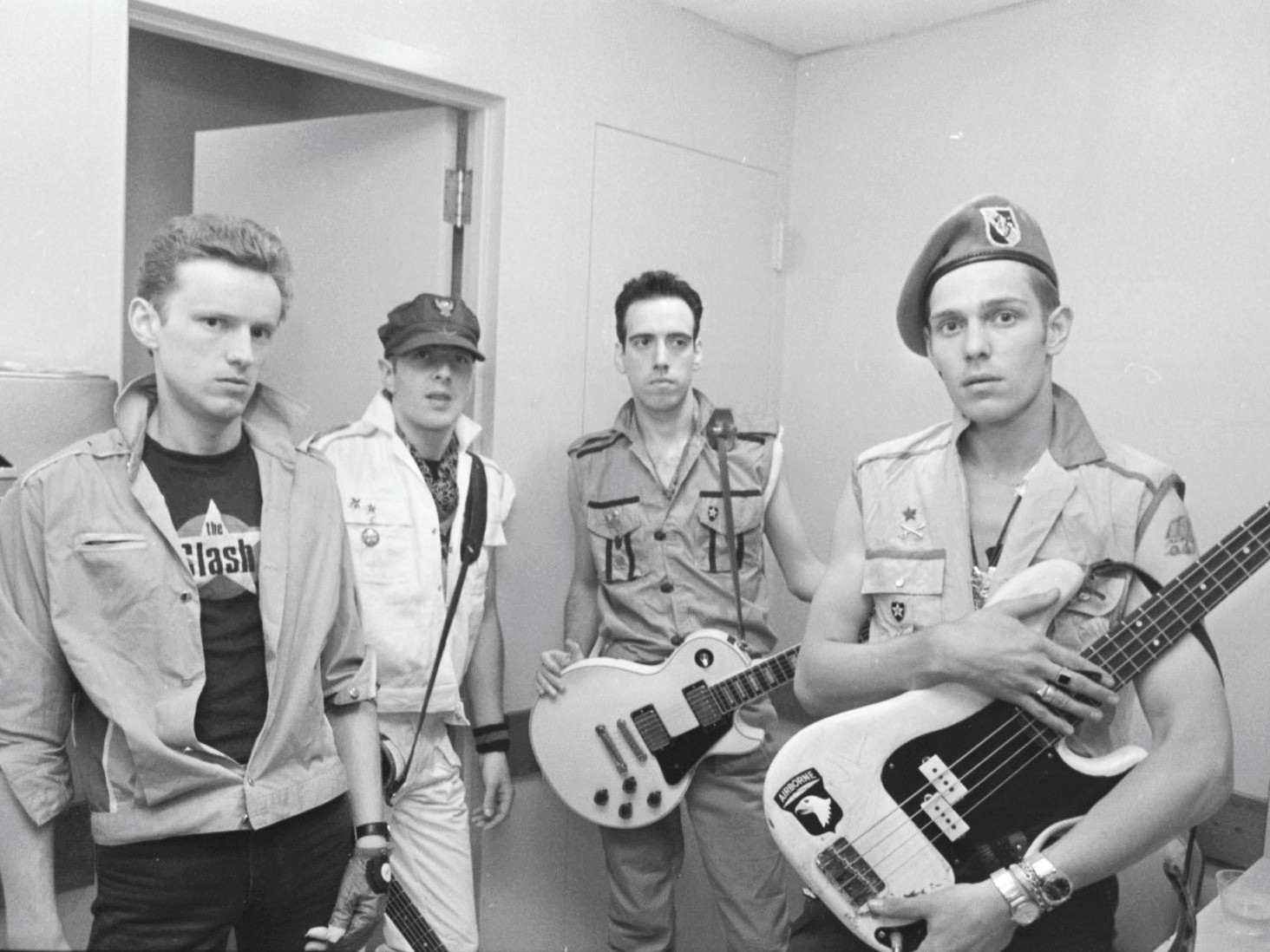
- The Clash in 1982. From left: Terry Chimes, Joe Strummer, Mick Jones, Paul Simonon.

Background information
- Origin: London, England
- Genres: Punk rock; new wave; post-punk; reggae; experimental rock
- Works: Albums and singles; songs
- Years active: 1976–1986
- Labels: CBS; Epic; Sony Music
- Spinoffs: Big Audio Dynamite; Havana 3am; The Latino Rockabilly War; The Mescaleros; Carbon/Silicon
- Past members: Joe Strummer; Mick Jones; Paul Simonon; Topper Headon; Terry Chimes; Keith Levene; Rob Harper; Pete Howard; Nick Sheppard; Vince White
- Website: theclash.com

The Clash were an English rock band formed in London in 1976. Billed as "The Only Band That Matters", they are considered one of the most influential acts in the original wave of British punk rock, with their music fusing elements of reggae, dub, funk, ska and rockabilly. The band also contributed to the post-punk and new wave movements that followed. For most of their recording career, the Clash consisted of lead vocalist and rhythm guitarist Joe Strummer, lead guitarist and vocalist Mick Jones, bassist Paul Simonon and drummer Nicky "Topper" Headon.

The Clash achieved critical and commercial success in the United Kingdom with the release of their debut album The Clash (1977) and their second album Give 'Em Enough Rope (1978). Their third album London Calling, which was released in the UK in December 1979, earned them popularity in the United States, where it was released the following month. A decade later, Rolling Stone named London Calling the best album of the 1980s. Following continued musical experimentation on their fourth album Sandinista! (1980), the band achieved further commercial success with the release of Combat Rock (1982), which includes the US top-10 hit "Rock the Casbah", helping the album to achieve a 2× platinum certification there.

In 1982, Headon left the band due to internal friction surrounding his increasing heroin addiction, and Jones departed the following year. With a new lineup, the band released their final album Cut the Crap in 1985 before disbanding a few weeks later.

In January 2003, shortly after the death of Joe Strummer, the band, including original drummer Terry Chimes, were inducted into the Rock and Roll Hall of Fame. In 2004, Rolling Stone ranked the Clash number 28 on its list of the "100 Greatest Artists of All Time".

== History ==
=== Origins: 1974–1976 ===
Before the Clash's founding, the band's future members were active in different parts of the London music scene. Joe Strummer, whose real name was John Graham Mellor, sang and played rhythm guitar in the pub rock band The 101ers, which he had formed in 1974 with Álvaro Peña-Rojas. Mellor later abandoned his original stage name "Woody" Mellor in favour of "Joe Strummer", a reference to his rudimentary strumming skills on the ukulele while he was a busker in the London Underground.

Mick Jones played guitar in protopunk band London SS and rehearsed for much of 1975, but never played a live show and recorded only one demo. London SS were managed by Bernard Rhodes, an associate of impresario Malcolm McLaren and a friend of the members of the Sex Pistols, whom McLaren managed. Jones and his bandmates became friendly with Sex Pistols members Glen Matlock and Steve Jones, who helped them as they auditioned potential new members. Bassist Paul Simonon and drummer Terry Chimes auditioned for London SS but were rejected, and Nicky Headon drummed with the band for a week then quit.

After London SS broke up in early 1976, Rhodes continued as Jones' manager. In February, Jones saw the Sex Pistols perform for the first time and commented: "You knew straight away that was it, and this was what it was going to be like from now on. It was a new scene, new values—so different from what had happened before. A bit dangerous." In March of that year, at the instigation of Rhodes, Jones contacted Simonon and suggested he learn an instrument so he could join the new band Jones was organising. Soon Jones, Simonon on bass, Keith Levene on guitar and "whoever we could find really to play the drums" were rehearsing. Chimes was asked to audition for the new band and was accepted but quit soon after.

The band were still searching for a lead singer. According to Chimes, Billy Watts, who "seemed to be, like, nineteen or eighteen then, as we all were", handled the duties for a time. Rhodes was watching Strummer, with whom he made exploratory contact; both Jones and Levene had seen Strummer perform and were impressed. In April, Strummer saw the Sex Pistols open for one of his band's gigs. Strummer later said:

I knew something was up, so I went out in the crowd which was fairly sparse. And I saw the future—with a snotty handkerchief—right in front of me. It was immediately clear. Pub rock was, "Hello, you bunch of drunks, I'm gonna play these boogies and I hope you like them." The Pistols came out that Tuesday evening and their attitude was, "Here's our tunes, and we couldn't give a flying fuck whether you like them or not. In fact, we're gonna play them even if you fucking hate them."

On 30 May, Rhodes and Levene approached Strummer after a 101ers gig and invited him to meet up at the band's rehearsal location on Davis Road. After Strummer turned up, Levene played "Keys to Your Heart", one of Strummer's own tunes. Rhodes gave Strummer 48 hours to decide whether to join the new band that would "rival the Pistols". Within 24 hours, he agreed. (Note: According to the band (2005), "Bernie phoned him a day ahead of schedule, and demanded an answer there and then" (p. 127). In Westway to the World, Jones confirms the 48-hour deadline, while Strummer says it was he who made the call after just 24 (11:34–11:40). Jones elsewhere gave a different account, according to which Strummer was originally given 24 hours to decide, and Rhodes called after just eight (Robb 2006, p. 194).) Simonon later said: "Once we had Joe on board it all started to come together". Strummer introduced the band to his school friend Pablo LaBritain, who sat in on drums during Strummer's first few rehearsals with the band. LaBritain left the band shortly after and joined 999. Terry Chimes, whom Jones later referred to as "one of the best drummers" in their circle, became the band's regular drummer.

In Westway to the World, Jones said: "I don't think Terry was officially hired or anything. He had just been playing with us." (Note: According to Gray (2005), Rhodes asked Chimes to rejoin (pp. 133–34)) Chimes did not like Strummer at first, saying: "He was like twenty-two or twenty-three or something that seemed 'old' to me then. And he had these retro clothes and this croaky voice." Simonon thought of the band's name; they had briefly named themselves the Weak Heartdrops and the Psychotic Negatives. According to Simonon: "It really came to my head when I started reading the newspapers and a word that kept recurring was the word 'clash', so I thought 'the Clash, what about that' to the others. And they and Bernard, they went for it."

=== Early gigs and the growing scene: 1976 ===
After rehearsing with Strummer for less than a month, the Clash made their debut performance on 4 July 1976, supporting the Sex Pistols at the Black Swan nightclub in Sheffield. The Clash wanted to appear on stage before their rivals the Damned, another London SS spinoff, made their own debut two days later. The Clash did not play in front of another audience for five weeks. Levene was becoming disaffected with his position in the group. At the Black Swan, he approached the Sex Pistols' lead singer John Lydon, whose stage name was Johnny Rotten, and suggested they form a band together if the Pistols broke up.

Hours after their debut, the Clash, most of the Sex Pistols and much of London's "inner circle" of punks attended a performance by New York City's leading punk rock band the Ramones at Dingwalls; according to Strummer: "It can't be stressed how great the first Ramones album was to the scene ... It was the first word of Punk, a fantastic record". Afterwards "came the first example of the rivalry-induced squabbling that was to dog the punk scene and undermine any attempts to promote a spirit of unity among the bands involved". Simonon fought with J.J. Burnel, the bass player of the Stranglers, a slightly older band who were publicly identified with the punk scene but were not part of the "inner circle", which centered on the Sex Pistols.

Rhodes insisted the Clash should not perform live again until they were much tighter so they intensely rehearsed the following month. According to Strummer, the band devoted themselves to creating a distinct identity, saying:

The day I joined The Clash was very much back to square one, year zero. Part of Punk was that you had to shed all of what you knew before. We were almost Stalinist in the way that you had to shed all your friends, or everything that you'd known, or every way that you'd played before.

Strummer and Jones shared most of the writing duties; according to Jones: "Joe would give me the words and I would make a song out of them". The band sometimes met in the office over their Camden Town rehearsal studio. According to Strummer: "Bernie [Rhodes] would say, 'An issue, an issue. Don't write about love, write about what's affecting you, what's important." Jones later said: "Bernie had a hand in everything. Not the lyrics—he didn't help with the lyrics. He didn't tell us not to write love songs, as the myth goes—that's kind of simplified version of it. He told us to write what we knew about".

Strummer performed lead vocals on the majority of songs but he and Jones sometimes shared the lead. Once the band began recording, Jones rarely had a solo lead on more than one song per album, though he was responsible for two of the group's biggest hits. On 13 August 1976, the Clash, wearing paint-spattered "Jackson Pollock" outfits, played in their Camden studio before a small, invitation-only audience, which included Sounds magazine critic Giovanni Dadamo, whose review described the band as a "runaway train ... so powerful, they're the first new group to come along who can really scare the Sex Pistols shitless".

On 29 August, the Clash and Manchester's Buzzcocks opened for the Sex Pistols at The Screen on the Green; it was the Clash's first public performance since 4 July. The triple-bill show is seen as pivotal to the consolidation of the British punk scene into a movement; New Musical Express reviewer Charles Shaar Murray wrote: "The Clash are the sort of garage band that should be speedily returned to the garage, preferably with the motor still running". Strummer later credited Murray's comments with inspiring the Clash's song "Garageland".

In early September, Levene and the band parted ways. According to Strummer, Levene's dwindling interest in the band was due to his use of speed, a point Levene denied. On 21 September 1976, the Clash performed publicly for the first time without Levene at the 100 Club Punk Special, sharing the bill with the Sex Pistols, Siouxsie and the Banshees and Subway Sect. Chimes left in late November; he was briefly replaced by Rob Harper as the Clash toured in support of the Sex Pistols during December's Anarchy Tour.

The Clash promoted a left-wing message in their songs and interviews and sang about social problems, such as career opportunities, unemployment and the need for a backlash against racism and oppression. Joe Strummer said in 1976: "We're anti-fascist, we're anti-violence, we're anti-racist and we're pro-creative". Strummer also said: "I don't believe in all that anarchy bollocks!" According to the Clash guitarist Mick Jones: "The important thing is to encourage people to do things for themselves, think for themselves and stand up for what their rights are".

A confrontation between Black youth and police at the 1976 Notting Hill Carnival was important in the development of the Clash's political stance and inspired Joe Strummer to write "White Riot". Images of the riots were used as The Clash's stage backdrop and as the back cover of their first album, and was reprinted on badges and Clash t-shirts.

=== Punk breakthrough and UK fame: 1977–1979 ===
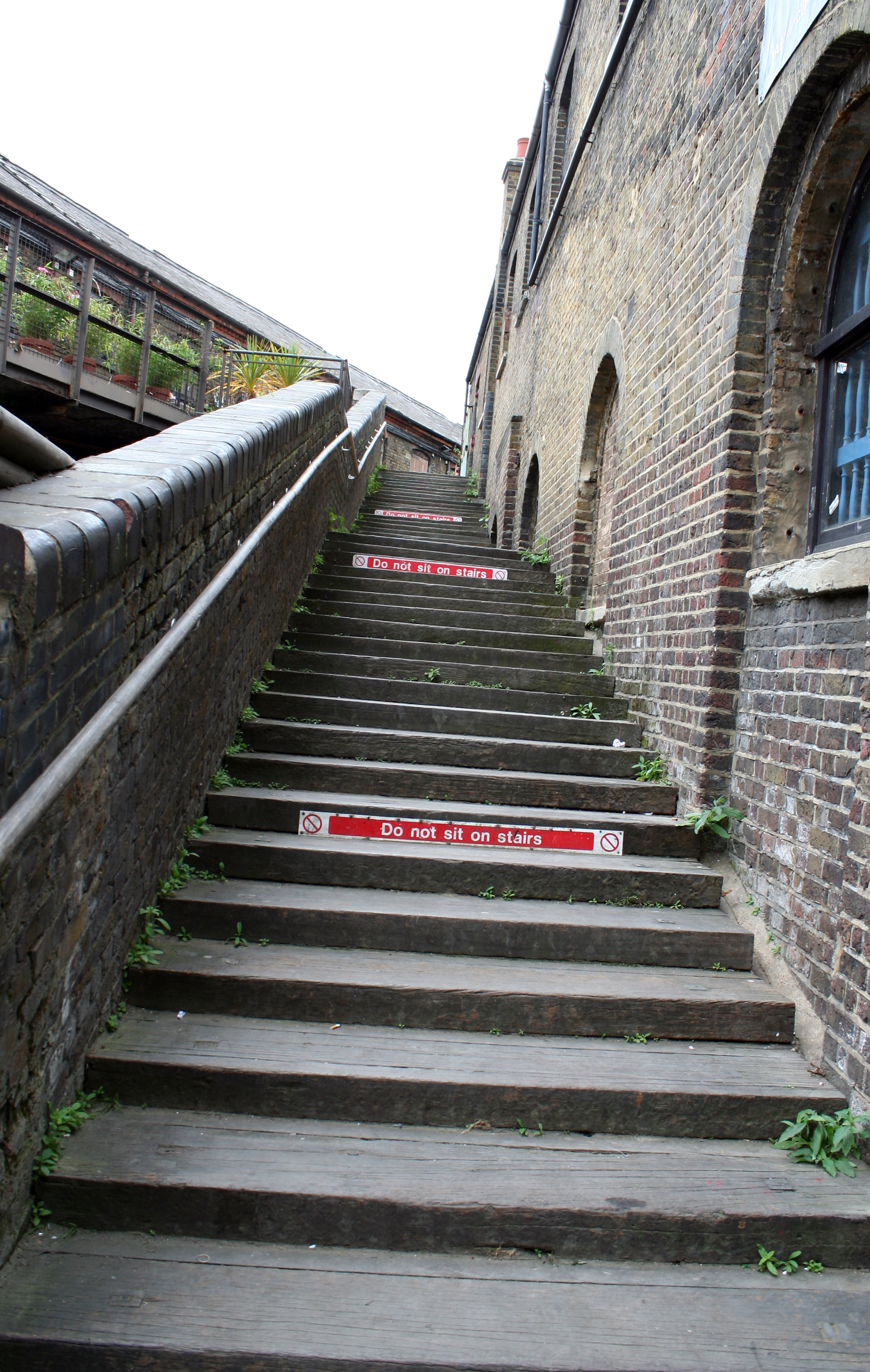
The cover of the band's debut album was shot on these stairs in Camden Market, London.

By January 1977, punk had become a major media phenomenon in the UK; according to New Musical Express (NME): "1977 is the year of The Clash". On 25 January, the band signed to CBS Records for £100,000, a remarkable amount for a band who had played about thirty gigs and very few headlining shows. Clash historian Marcus Gray said: "the band members found themselves having to justify [the deal] to both the music press and to fans who picked up on the critics' muttered asides about the Clash having 'sold out' to the establishment". Mark Perry, founder of the leading London punk periodical Sniffin' Glue wrote: "Punk died the day the Clash signed to CBS", but recanted when he first heard the single "White Riot", saying: "They're the most important group in the world at the moment. I believe in them completely. All I said about them is crap." According to one of the band's associates the deal "was later used as a classic example of the kind of contract that no group should ever sign—the group had to pay for their own tours, recordings, remixes, artwork, expenses ..." According to Strummer in March 1977:

Signing that contract did bother me a lot. I've been turning it over in my mind, but now I've come to terms with it. I've realised that all it boils down to is perhaps two-year's security ... Before, all I could think about was my stomach ... Now I feel free to think—and free to write down what I'm thinking about ... And look—I've been fucked about for so long I'm not going to suddenly turn into Rod Stewart just because I get £25.00 a week. I'm much too far gone for that, I tell you.

Mickey Foote, who worked as a technician at the band's concerts, was hired to produce their debut album, and Terry Chimes was drafted back for the recording. The band's first single "White Riot" was released in March and peaked at number 34 in the UK Singles Chart. The album The Clash was released the following month and peaked at number 12 on the UK Albums Chart; with lyrics criticising the ruling establishment, bosses and the police and addressing themes such as alienation and boredom.

The Clash presaged the band's future works with their cover of the reggae song "Police and Thieves". The band had been influenced by the subject matter, slogans and lyrics of reggae, which they often played in rehearsals but recording "Police and Thieves" was an important step that was only taken after a lot of discussion within the group.

According to music journalist and former punk musician John Robb: "Amidst the Sex Pistols' inertia in the first half of 1977, the Clash found themselves as the flag-wavers of the punk rock consciousness". Though The Clash quickly rose to number 12 in the UK, CBS refused to give it a US release, believing that its raw, barely produced sound would make it unmarketable there. A North American version of the album with a modified track listing was released in the US in 1979 after the UK release had become the US's best-selling import album of the year.

Chimes, whose career aspirations owed little to the punk ethos, left the band again soon after the recording sessions. He later said: "The point was I wanted one kind of life and they wanted another and, like, why are we working together, if we want completely different things?" As a result, only Simonon, Jones and Strummer are featured on the album's cover, and Chimes was credited as "Tory Crimes". Strummer later said: "We must have tried every drummer that then had a kit. I mean every drummer in London. I think we counted 205. And that's why we were lost until we found Topper Headon." Simonon nicknamed Headon, who had briefly played with Jones's band London SS, "Topper" because he felt Headon resembled Mickey the Monkey, a character in the comic Topper. Headon could also play piano, bass and guitar. The day after he signed to the band, Headon said: "I really wanted to join the Clash. I want to give them even more energy than they've got—if that's possible"; in an interview over twenty years later, he said his original plan was to stay briefly, gain a name for himself and then move on to a better gig. Strummer later said: "Finding someone who not only had the chops, but the strength and the stamina to do it was just the breakthrough for us".

In May, the Clash set out on the White Riot Tour, headlining a punk package that included Buzzcocks, the Jam, Subway Sect, the Slits and the Prefects. The day after a Newcastle gig, Strummer and Headon were arrested for stealing pillowcases from their hotel room. The highlight of the tour was the Rainbow Theatre in London on 9 May; it was the first time The Clash had played a major music venue. The audience began ripping up seats and the gig turned into a riot. The Sun reported the violence with the front-page headline "Punk Wreck". New Musical Express, while expressing serious concerns over the violence, said: "The Clash are probably the best band in the country right now". Strummer commented: "That was the night punk broke ... we were in the right place doing the right thing at the right time".

That same month, CBS released "Remote Control" as The Clash's second single, defying the wishes of the band, who saw it as one of the album's weakest tracks. Headon's first recording with the band was the single "Complete Control", which addresses the band's anger at their record label's behaviour. It was co-produced by reggae artist Lee "Scratch" Perry, though Foote was summoned to "ground things". The single was released in September 1977 and NME commented that CBS had allowed the group to "bait their masters". The single peaked at number 28 on the UK chart and has been cited as one of punk's greatest singles.

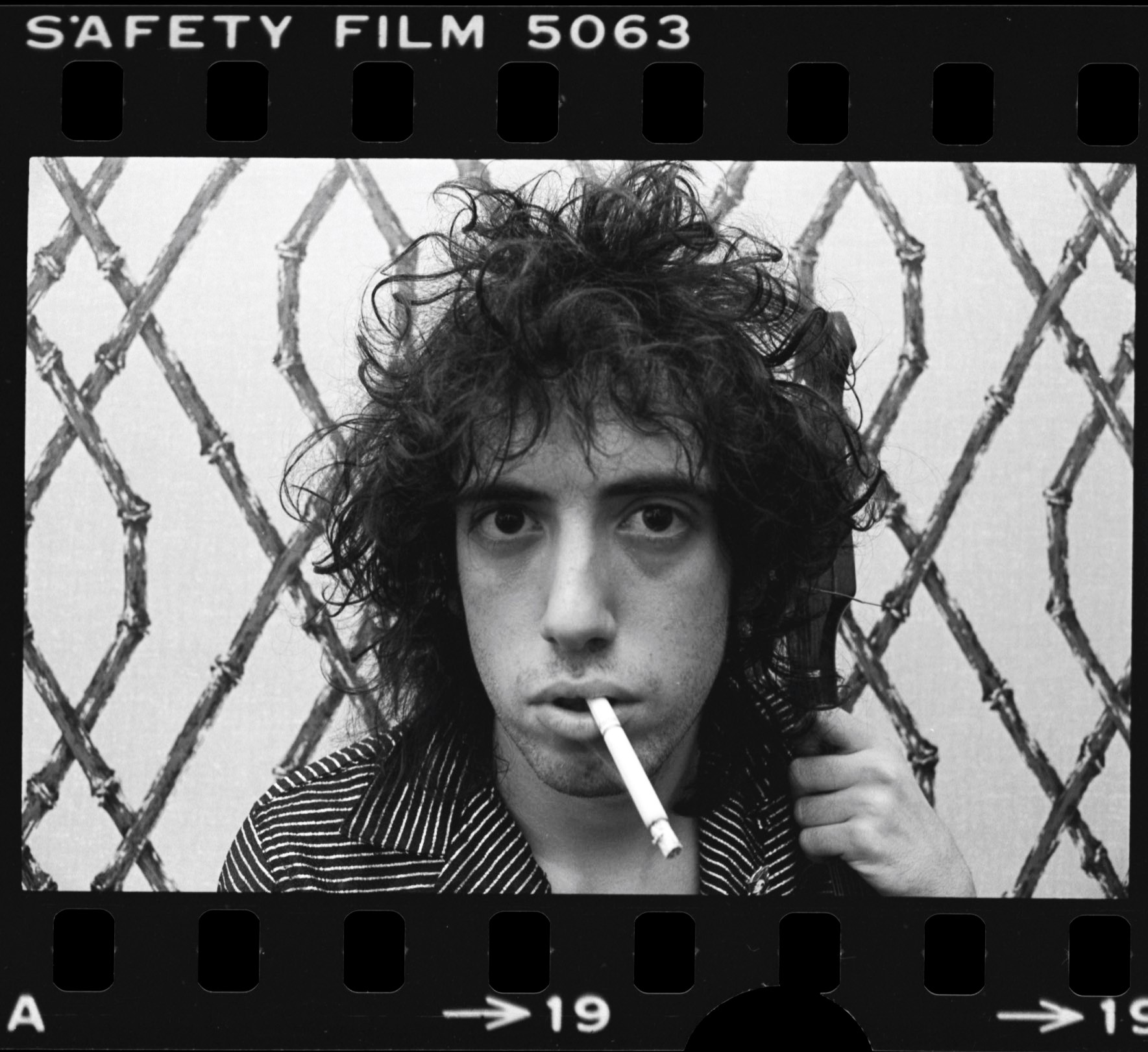
Jones in 1978.

In October 1977, the Clash set out on the "Out of Control" UK tour. The tour was due to open at the Ulster Hall, Belfast but the insurance was pulled and the gig was cancelled at the last moment. This led to punks blocking the road outside the venue and a confrontation between the punks and the police, which became known as the "Battle of Bedford Street".

In February 1978, the Clash released the single "Clash City Rockers"; and played the song live, along with "Tommy Gun", on BBC television's youth show Something Else. On 30 April, the Clash played at Rock Against Racism in Victoria Park, London. Late 1970s England had seen an increase in racist attacks and a growth in support for the far-right political party The National Front. Also on the bill were X-Ray Spex, Steel Pulse, Misty in Roots and headliners Tom Robinson Band; they played to 100,000 people, who marched through London and attended the RAR Carnival.

In June, the band released "(White Man) In Hammersmith Palais" as a single, which peaked at number 32 in the UK Singles chart; it quickly became a favourite with Clash fans and was voted single of the year in the 1978 NME Readers' Poll.

Before the Clash began recording their second album, CBS requested they adopt a cleaner sound than its predecessor to reach American audiences. Sandy Pearlman, who is known for his work with Blue Öyster Cult, was hired to produce the record. Simonon later said: "[R]ecording that album was just the most boring situation ever. It was just so nitpicking, such a contrast to the first album ... it ruined any spontaneity." Strummer said: "it wasn't our easiest session". The band dismissed their manager Bernie Rhodes and hired artist and journalist Caroline Coon to replace him.

The album Give 'Em Enough Rope was released in early November 1978, and received mixed reviews in the UK music press, where some reviewers complained about its relatively mainstream production style. The album reached number 2 in the UK album chart. NME readers voted Give 'Em Enough Rope the second-best album of 1978 and the Clash were voted the best group in the same end-of-year poll. In the US, the album peaked at number 128 on the Billboard chart.

"Tommy Gun", the album's first UK single, peaked at number 19, the highest chart position for a Clash single to date. To accompany the single, the band produced their first official music video, in which Joe Strummer wears an H Block T-shirt in support of the campaign for political status for Irish Republican prisoners. The band embarked on a North American tour, culminating in a performance at the Palladium in New York City.

"English Civil War", which warned against the rise of the far-right in the UK, was released as the album's second single in February 1979, reaching number 25 in the UK Singles Chart. The B-side is a cover of the Toots and the Maytals' song "Pressure Drop", once again illustrating the group's reggae influences.

In support of the album, the Clash toured the UK supported by the Slits and the Innocents. The tour, which consisted of more than thirty shows, was promoted as the Sort It Out Tour. The band later undertook their first, largely successful tour of North America in February 1979.

In June 1979, the band released the extended play (EP) The Cost of Living, which includes a cover of Bobby Fuller's song "I Fought the Law", two original songs and a re-recording of "Capital Radio". The EP reached 22 in the UK charts and the band dismissed Coon as their manager. They then embarked on a second tour of the US, adding Mick Gallagher on keyboards.

=== Changing style and US breakthrough: 1979–1982 ===
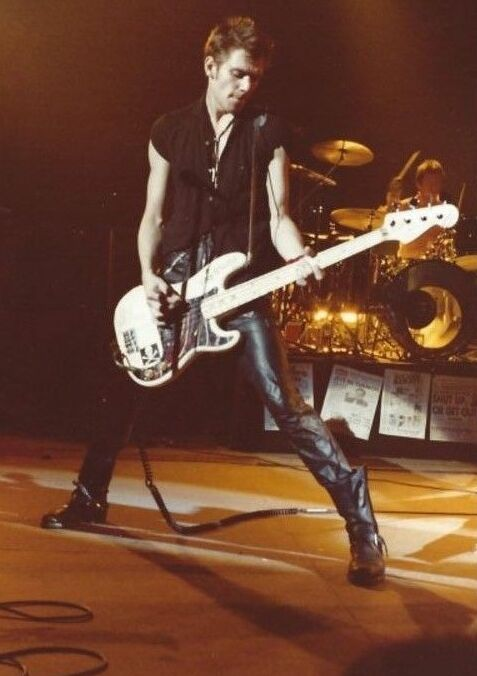
Simonon performing at the Palladium in 1979. Simonon would smash his bass against the stage later during this performance; a photograph of the event became the cover of London Calling.

In August and September 1979, the Clash recorded the double album London Calling, which Guy Stevens, a former A&R executive who had worked with Mott the Hoople and Traffic, produced. The double album was a mix of punk rock, reggae, ska, rockabilly and traditional rock and roll. It is regarded as one of the greatest rock albums ever recorded. In the US, the single "Train in Vain" became their first top-40 hit, peaking at number 23 on the Billboard chart. In the UK, the title track was released as a single and peaked at number 11—the highest position any Clash single reached in the UK before the band's break-up.

London Calling was released in December 1979; it peaked at number 9 on the British album chart and at number 27 in the United States, where it was issued in January 1980. The album's cover photograph by Pennie Smith became one of the most-recognisable images and Q magazine later cited it as the "best rock 'n roll photograph of all time". During this period, The Clash began to be regularly billed as "The Only Band That Matters". Musician Gary Lucas, who was employed by CBS Records' creative services department, has said he coined the tagline. Fans and journalists soon widely adopted the epithet.

At the end of 1979, the band members attended a private screening of a new film called Rude Boy, which is part fiction and tells the story of a Clash fan who leaves his job in a Soho sex shop to become a roadie for the group. The movie, which was named after the rude boy subculture, includes footage of the band on tour, at a London Rock Against Racism concert and in the studio recording Give 'Em Enough Rope. The band were disenchanted with the film so they had Better Badges make badges that said: "I don't want RUDE BOY Clash Film". On 27 February 1980, the film premiered at the 30th Berlin International Film Festival, where it won an honourable mention.

The Clash had planned to record and release a single every month in 1980. CBS dismissed this idea and the band released only one single—an original reggae song called "Bankrobber", in August. It featured Mikey Dread and reached number 12 in the UK Singles Chart. In October, the band's US record company released a B-side compilation EP called Black Market Clash, which was later re-released in expanded form as a full-length album.

In December 1980, the Clash released the 36-song triple album Sandinista!, which again reflected a broad range of musical styles. It was produced by the band members with further participation of Mikey Dread. Sandinista! proved to be controversial, both politically and musically. Critical opinions were divided; Trouser Press writer Ira Robbins described half of the album as "great" and the other half as "nonsense" and worse, while New Rolling Stone Record Guide critic Dave Marsh said: "Sandinista! is nonsensically cluttered. Or rather seems nonsensically cluttered. One of the Clash's principal concerns ... is to avoid being stereotyped." The album sold reasonably well in the US, where it charted at number 24. In the UK, the album peaked at number 19 and the single "The Call Up" charted at number 40. In January 1980, Rhodes was reinstated as the band's manager and the single "Hitsville UK" reached number 54 in the UK Singles Chart while "The Magnificent Seven" charted at number 34, and the band spent most of the year touring.

In May and June 1981, the band played a series of gigs in New York that are documented in the record "The Clash at Bonds International Casino". In December 1981, the Clash released "This Is Radio Clash" as a single; it charted at number 47 in the UK Singles Chart. In September 1981, the band began work on their fifth album Combat Rock, which Glyn Johns produced and was released in May 1982. In the UK, the first single "Know Your Rights" reached number 43. The lead single in the US was "Should I Stay or Should I Go", which was released in June 1982 and received significant airplay on Album-oriented rock (AOR) stations. The follow-up single "Rock the Casbah" was composed by Headon, who performed the percussion, piano and bass on the track. It became the band's biggest US hit, charting at number eight while the album reached number two in the UK and number seven in the US.

=== Disintegration and break up: 1982–1986 ===
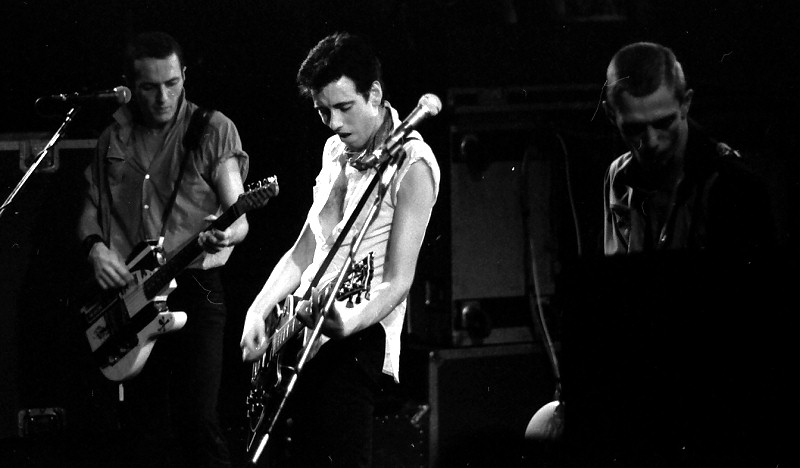
The Clash in Oslo, 1980.

After the release of Combat Rock, the Clash began to disintegrate. In May 1982, Headon was asked to leave the band because his addiction caused reliability problems. Chimes was brought back to drum for the next few months. The band opened for the Who on a leg of their final US tour that included a show at New York's Shea Stadium.

Chimes left the band after the Combat Rock Tour and was replaced with Pete Howard in May 1983. The Clash co-headlined the US Festival in San Bernardino, California, on 28 May in front of a crowd of 140,000. After the show, members of the band brawled with security staff. The festival was Jones' last appearance with the band; Strummer and Simonon dismissed him in September that year. Nick Sheppard, formerly of the Bristol-based band the Cortinas, and Vince White were recruited as the Clash's new guitarists. The band's new lineup played their first shows in January 1984 with a batch of new material and embarked on the self-financed Out of Control Tour, travelling widely over the winter and into early summer. The band also headlined a benefit show for striking miners.

In November 1985, they released the album Cut the Crap; it includes the single "This Is England", which charted at number 24 in the UK Singles Chart. Strummer later noted: "CBS had paid an advance for it so they had to put it out". Dave Marsh later listed "This Is England" as one of the top 1001 rock singles of all time. The album peaked at number 16 in the UK Albums Chart and at number 88 in the US. Strummer largely disowned the album but later said: "I really like 'This Is England' and [album track] 'North and South' is a vibe".

In January 1986, it was announced that the Clash had disbanded. Strummer later said: "When the Clash collapsed, we were tired. There had been a lot of intense activity in five years. Secondly, I felt we'd run out of idea gasoline. And thirdly, I wanted to shut up and let someone else have a go at it."

=== Collaborations, reunions and Strummer's death: 1986–present ===
After his dismissal, Jones formed Big Audio Dynamite (B.A.D.), who released their debut album This Is Big Audio Dynamite late in 1985. Jones and Strummer worked together on their respective 1986 projects; Jones helped with the two songs Strummer wrote and performed for the soundtrack to the film Sid and Nancy (1986), and Strummer co-wrote a number of the tracks for the second B.A.D. album No. 10, Upping St., which he also co-produced. With Jones committed to B.A.D., Strummer moved on to solo projects and screen acting. Simonon formed a band called Havana 3am. Headon recorded a solo album Waking Up but was imprisoned in 1987 for drug-related offences.

In 1988, the compilation album The Story of the Clash, Volume 1 was released and the single "I Fought The Law" was reissued and reached number 29 in the UK Singles Chart. On 2 March 1991, a reissue of "Should I Stay or Should I Go" gave the Clash their first and only number-one UK single. The same year, "Rock the Casbah" featured on a broadcast of Armed Forces Radio during the Gulf War.

In 1999, Strummer, Jones and Simonon cooperated in compiling the live album From Here to Eternity and the video documentary Westway to the World. On 7 November 2002, the Rock and Roll Hall of Fame announced the Clash would be inducted the following March. On 15 November, Jones and Strummer shared the stage, performing three Clash songs during a London benefit show by Joe Strummer and the Mescaleros. Strummer, Jones and Headon wanted to play a reunion show to coincide with their induction into the Hall of Fame; Simonon did not want to participate because he believed playing at the high-priced event would not have been in the spirit of the Clash.

Strummer died from a congenital heart defect on 22 December 2002, ending any possibility of a full reunion. In March 2003, Strummer, Jones, Simonon, Chimes and Headon were inducted into the Hall of Fame.

In early 2008, Carbon/Silicon, a new band founded by Mick Jones and his former London SS bandmate Tony James, entered into a six-week residency at London's Inn on the Green. On opening night, 11 January, Headon joined the band for the Clash's song "Train in Vain". An encore followed with Headon playing drums on "Should I Stay or Should I Go". This was the first time since 1982 that Headon and Jones had performed together on stage.

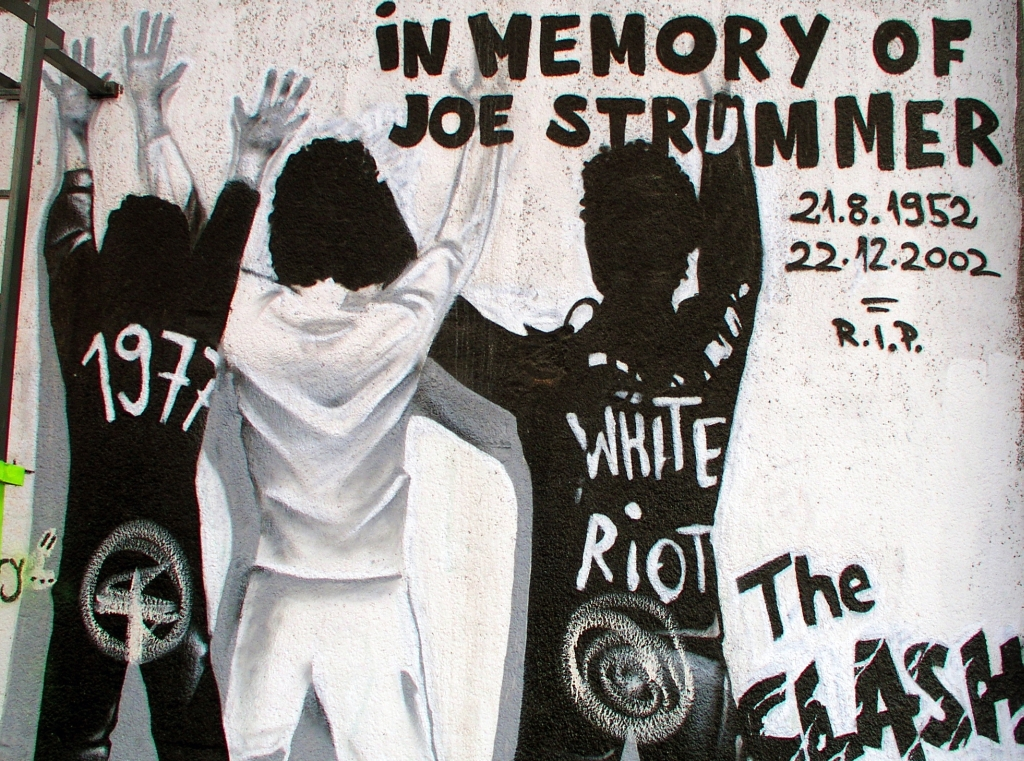
Graffiti in Rijeka, Croatia, commemorating Joe Strummer

In September 2009, Jones and Headon reunited to re-record the 1970s Clash B-side "Jail Guitar Doors" with Billy Bragg, who founded an eponymous charity that gives musical instruments and lessons to prison inmates. Simonon and Jones are featured on the title track of the Gorillaz album Plastic Beach (2010), marking the first time they had worked together in over twenty years. They later joined the Gorillaz live band for their 2010 live dates, including the Escape to Plastic Beach Tour.

In July 2012, Strummer's daughters Jazz and Lola gave a rare interview to discuss the tenth anniversary of Strummer's death, his legacy and the possibility of a Clash reunion had their father lived. Jazz said:

There was talk about the Clash reforming before he died. But there had been talk for years and years about them reforming. They had been offered stupid amounts of money to do it, but they were very good at keeping the moral high ground and saying no. But I think if Dad hadn't died, it would have happened. It felt like it was in the air.

In the UK on 9 September 2013, and a day later in the US, the Clash released a 12-disc box set called Sound System, which includes their re-mastered studio albums on eight discs and three discs featuring demos, non-album singles, rarities and B-sides; a DVD with previously unseen footage by Don Letts and Julien Temple and other film footage; and merchandising ephemera, including an exclusive the Clash poster. Mick Jones and Paul Simonon oversaw the project, including the re-masters. The box set was accompanied by 5 Album Studio Set, which contains the first five studio albums (excluding Cut the Crap) and The Clash Hits Back, a 33-track, two-CD best-of collection.

In a 3 September 2013 interview with Rolling Stone, Mick Jones discussed the band reuniting, saying it likely would not have occurred. Jones said:

There were a few moments at the time I was up for it (Hall of Fame reunion in 2003), Joe was up for it. Paul wasn't. And neither, probably, was Topper, who didn't wind up even coming in the end. It didn't look like a performance was going to happen anyway. I mean, you usually play at that ceremony when you get in. Joe had passed by that point, so we didn't. We were never in agreement. It was never at a point where all of us wanted to do it at the same time. Most importantly for us, we became friends again after the group broke up, and continued that way for the rest of the time. That was more important to us than the band.

Jones also stated the Sound System box set was the last time he would be involved in the band's releases: "I'm not even thinking about any more Clash releases. This is it for me, and I say that with an exclamation mark".

On 6 September 2013, Mick Jones, Paul Simonon and Topper Headon reunited for an exclusive BBC Radio 6 Music show to promote their legacy and the release of Sound System.

In an October 2013 interview with BBC 6 Music, Jones said Strummer did have intentions of a Clash reunion and that new music was being written for a possible album. In the months before Strummer's death, Jones and Strummer began working on new music for what he thought would be the next Mescaleros album. Jones said:

We wrote a batch – we didn't used to write one, we used to write a batch at a time – like gumbo. The idea was he was going to go into the studio with the Mescaleros during the day and then send them all home. I'd come in all night and we'd all work all night.

According to Jones, months after their work together, he ran into Strummer at an event; Strummer informed him the songs were going to be used for the next Clash album.

On 6 April 2022, the Clash announced the re-release of Combat Rock, including demos with Ranking Roger's vocals, titled 'Combat Rock / The People's Hall'. "Rock the Casbah (Ranking Roger)" and "Red Angel Dragnet (Ranking Roger)" were released as supporting singles. The re-release occurred on 20 May 2022 to mixed reviews.

On 11 November 2022, a month before the 20th anniversary of Strummer's death, founding member Keith Levene died in Norfolk, England.

== Politics ==
The Clash's music often expresses left-wing ideological sentiments. Strummer was a committed socialist. They are credited with pioneering the advocacy of radical politics in punk rock; NME dubbed them "Thinking Man's Yobs". Like many early punk bands, the Clash protested against monarchy and aristocracy but unlike many of their peers, they rejected nihilism. Instead, they found solidarity with a number of liberation movements and were involved with groups such as the Anti-Nazi League. At their performance on 30 April 1978 at the Rock Against Racism concert in London's Victoria Park for a crowd of between 50,000 and 100,000 people, Strummer wore a T-shirt identifying two far-left armed militant groups: Italy's Red Brigades (Brigate Rosse, misspelt as Brigade Rosse on the T-shirt) and West Germany's Red Army Faction.

According to rock historian Mikal Gilmore:

The moment that best exemplifies the Clash ... took place in August 1977, at a music festival in Liege, Belgium. The band was playing before 20,000 people and had been under fire from a crowd that was throwing bottles at the stage. But that wasn't what bothered lead singer Joe Strummer. What enraged him was a 10-foot-high barbed-wire fence strung between concrete posts and forming a barrier between the group and the audience ... [He] jumped from the stage and attacked the fence, trying to pull it down ... The Clash were the only performers at the show who tried to do anything about the obstacle. They were more willing to run the risk of the crowd than to tolerate barbed wire that was meant to fend off that crowd. This is more or less what the Clash were about: fighting the good fight that few others would fight.

The band made their politics explicit in the lyrics of early recordings including "White Riot", which encourages disaffected white youths to riot like their black counterparts; "Career Opportunities", which addressed the alienation of low-paid, routine jobs and discontent over the lack of alternatives; and "London's Burning" is about the bleakness and boredom of life in the inner city. Caroline Coon, who was associated with the punk scene, said: "[t]hose tough, militaristic songs were what we needed as we went into Thatcherism".

The title of Sandinista! refers to the Sandinista National Liberation Front, a group of left-wing rebels who had recently overthrown Nicaraguan President Anastasio Somoza Debayle; the album includes songs that were inspired by other political issues; "Washington Bullets" addresses covert military operations around the globe and "The Call-Up" is a meditation on US draft policies. Scholars Simon Reynolds and Joy Press described Combat Rock's track "Straight to Hell" as an "around-the-world-at-war-in-five-verses guided tour of hell-zones where boy-soldiers had languished".

The band's political sentiments are reflected in their resistance to the music industry's profit motivations; even at their peak, tickets to shows and souvenirs were reasonably priced. The group insisted CBS sell their double and triple albums London Calling and Sandinista! for the price of a single album (then £5), succeeding with the former and compromising with the latter by agreeing to sell it for £5.99 and forfeit their performance royalties on the first 200,000 sales. These "value for money" (VFM) principles meant they were constantly in debt to CBS and only started to break even around 1982.

== Musical style and influences ==
The Clash are mainly described as a punk rock band. According to Stephen Thomas Erlewine of AllMusic, "Sex Pistols may have been the first British punk rock band, but the Clash were the definitive British punk rockers". Later in their career, the Clash used elements of a variety of musical genres, including reggae, rockabilly, dub and R&B. With their double album London Calling, the band expanded the breadth of their musical styles. Consequently, the band's music has also been described as experimental rock and new wave. Since their beginnings, the band has covered and composed songs in the reggae genre, and incorporated lovers' rock into London Calling.

== Legacy and influence ==
In 2004, Rolling Stone ranked the Clash number 28 on its list of the 100 Greatest Artists of All Time, and in 2010, the band was ranked 22nd on VH1's 100 Greatest Artists of All Time. According to The Times, the Clash's debut, alongside Never Mind the Bollocks, Here's the Sex Pistols, is "punk's definitive statement" and London Calling "remains one of the most influential rock albums". London Calling was ranked eighth In Rolling Stone's 2003 list of the 500 greatest albums of all time, which is the highest entry by a punk band; in the same list, The Clash was ranked 77th and Sandinista! was ranked 404th. In the magazine's 2004 list of the 500 Greatest Songs of All Time, "London Calling" was ranked number 15, again the highest entry for any song by a punk band. Four other Clash songs made the list: "Should I Stay Or Should I Go" (228), "Train in Vain" (292), "Complete Control" (361) and "(White Man) in Hammersmith Palais" (430). "London Calling" ranked number 48 in the magazine's 2008 list of the 100 Greatest Guitar Songs of All Time. In 2010, the cover art of London Calling was one of ten albums by British music acts whose albums were commemorated on a UK postage stamp issued by Royal Mail.

Jake Burns of Stiff Little Fingers, the first major punk band from Northern Ireland, said of their debut album's impact:

[T]he big watershed was the Clash album—that was go out, cut your hair, stop mucking about time, y'know. Up to that point we'd still been singing about bowling down California highways. I mean, it meant nothing to me. Although the Damned and the Pistols were great, they were only exciting musically; lyrically, I couldn't really make out a lot of it ... [T]o realise that [The Clash] were actually singing about their own lives in West London was like a bolt out of the blue.

The Clash inspired many musicians who were only loosely associated, if at all, with punk. The band's embrace of ska and reggae and England's Jamaican subculture helped provide impetus for the 2 Tone movement that emerged after the punk explosion. Other musicians who began performing while the Clash were active and acknowledged their debt to the band include Billy Bragg and Aztec Camera. U2's the Edge has compared the Clash's inspirational effect to that of the Ramones, both of which gave young rock musicians a "sense that the door of possibility had swung open". He wrote: "The Clash, more than any other group, kick-started a thousand garage bands across Ireland and the UK ... [S]eeing them perform was a life-changing experience". Bono described the Clash as "the greatest rock band. They wrote the rule book for U2."

While Sex Pistols' June and July 1976 debut gig at Manchester's Lesser Free Trade Hall has been acknowledged as the starting point of that city's punk scene, the Clash's first performance at Eric's, where they were supported by the Specials, had a similar effect in Liverpool. The gig was witnessed by Jayne Casey, Julian Cope, Pete Wylie, Pete Burns, Bill Drummond, Holly Johnson, Will Sergeant, Budgie and Ian McCulloch. Jon Langford of the Mekons said:

You can't overestimate how important The Clash were back in 1977. We loved the Pistols' self-aware nihilism, but we didn't want to be the Pistols, and if The Clash were cartoon-heroic and occasionally a bit silly we still loved them and recognised the risks they were taking.

The Clash's influence can be heard in the works of American political punk bands such as the Offspring, Rancid, Anti-Flag, Bad Religion, NOFX, Green Day and Rise Against, and in the political hard rock of early Manic Street Preachers. California band Rancid are known as "incurable Clash zealots". The title track of Rancid's album Indestructible says: "I'll keep listening to that great Joe Strummer!" Outside rock music, Chuck D has credited the Clash as an inspiration for Public Enemy, in particular for their use of socially and politically conscious lyrics, which gained them attention from the music press: "They talked about important subjects, so therefore journalists printed what they said, which was very pointed ... We took that from the Clash, because we were very similar in that regard. Public Enemy just did it 10 years later". In 2019, Chuck D narrated Stay Free: The Story of The Clash, an eight-part podcast series produced by Spotify and BBC Studios.

According to biographer Antonio Ambrosio, the Clash's involvement with Jamaican musical and production styles inspired similar cross-cultural efforts by bands such as Bad Brains, Massive Attack, 311, Sublime and No Doubt. Jakob Dylan of the Wallflowers lists London Calling as the record that "changed his life". Bands identified with the garage rock revival of the late 1990s and 2000s such as Sweden's the Hives, Australia's the Vines, Britain's the Libertines and America's the White Stripes and the Strokes, show the Clash's influence. Among the many late-20th-century British acts identified as having been inspired by the Clash are Babyshambles, the Futureheads, the Charlatans and Arctic Monkeys.

=== Use in film and television ===
The band's 1982 hit "Should I Stay or Should I Go" appears in multiple episodes of the 2016 Netflix science-fiction drama series Stranger Things, which is set in 1983. London Town, a film that tells the story of a Clash-obsessed teenager who in 1979 meets Joe Strummer by chance and finds his life changing as a result, was released in 2016.

=== Notable covers of the Clash songs ===
Before M.I.A. had an international hit in 2008 with "Paper Planes", which is built around a sample from "Straight to Hell", she referenced "London Calling" on 2003's "Galang". A cover of "The Guns of Brixton" by German punk band Die Toten Hosen was released as a single in 2006. A version by reggae singer Jimmy Cliff with Tim Armstrong from Rancid was scheduled for release in November 2011. American-Irish punk band Dropkick Murphys released a cover of "The Guns of Brixton" on Anti Heroes vs Dropkick Murphys (1997).

In June 2009, Bruce Springsteen & the E Street Band opened their concert in Hyde Park, London, with "London Calling". The concert was later released on DVD as London Calling: Live in Hyde Park. Bruce Springsteen, Little Steven, Dave Grohl and Elvis Costello performed the same song at the 2003 Grammys as a tribute to Joe Strummer, who died the year before. In 2009, Springsteen & the E Street Band covered Strummer's song "Coma Girl" and in 2014, along with Tom Morello, they opened some of their shows on the High Hopes Tour with "Clampdown". Ben Folds covered "Lost in the Supermarket" for the soundtrack to the 2006 animated film Over the Hedge.

The band has also had a notable impact on music in the Spanish-speaking world. In 1997, a Clash tribute album featuring performances by Buenos Aires punk bands was released. Many rock en español bands such as Todos Tus Muertos, Café Tacuba, Maldita Vecindad, Los Prisioneros, Tijuana No and Attaque 77 are indebted to the Clash. Argentina's Los Fabulosos Cadillacs covered "Should I Stay or Should I Go", London Calling's "Revolution Rock" and "The Guns of Brixton", and invited Mick Jones to sing on their song "Mal Bicho". The Clash's influence is similarly reflected in Paris-founded band Mano Negra's politicised lyrics and fusion of musical styles.

In March 2022, following Russia's invasion of Ukraine, surviving members of the Clash gave permission to Ukrainian punk band Beton to rewrite the lyrics of London Calling. The song was mixed in Los Angeles by music producer Danny Saber and proceeds from its sales were designated to help fund war efforts.

== Band members ==
Key former members

- Joe Strummer – lead vocals, backing vocals, rhythm guitar (1976–1986; died 2002)
- Mick Jones – lead guitar, lead vocals, backing vocals (1976–1983)
- Paul Simonon – bass, backing vocals, lead vocals (1976–1986)
- Terry Chimes – drums, percussion (1976–1977, 1982–1983)
- Nicky "Topper" Headon – drums, percussion (1977–1982)

== Discography ==
- The Clash (1977)
- Give 'Em Enough Rope (1978)
- London Calling (1979)
- Sandinista! (1980)
- Combat Rock (1982)
- Cut the Crap (1985)

== See also ==
- Album era
- The Clash on film
- John Richards, KEXP radio personality, created International Clash Day on 7 February 2013.
