= Shakedown! The Texas Tapes Revisited =

Compilation album by Bobby Fuller
- Released: October 1, 1996
- Recorded: 1961–1964
- Genre: Rock, pop
- Length: 2:10:11
- Label: Del-Fi

Bobby Fuller chronology
El Paso Rock Vol. 2: More Early Recordings (1996)	Shakedown! The Texas Tapes Revisited (1996)	Never To Be Forgotten: The Mustang Years (1997)

Shakedown! The Texas Tapes Revisited is a Grammy nominated compilation of the work of Bobby Fuller and his recording band in El Paso, Texas before signing to Bob Keane's Del-Fi Records 1964. The two CDs compile Fuller's hit local singles, and a wealth of outtakes and other recordings over its 50 tracks.

Professional ratings
Review scores
Source	Rating
Allmusic	4.5/5 stars

== Track listing ==
All tracks are written by Bobby Fuller except where noted.

Disc 1
No.	Title	Writer(s)	Length
1.	"Say Sweetheart"		2:18
2.	"You’re In Love"	Bobby Fuller, Mary Stone	2:02
3.	"Guess We’ll Fall In Love"		2:21
4.	"Gently My Love"		1:57
5.	"My Heart Jumped"	Dick Liberatore	2:14
6.	"Nervous Breakdown"	Mario Roccuzzo	2:14
7.	"Not Fade Away"	Buddy Holly, Norman Petty	2:12
8.	"Rock House"	Conway Twitty, Roy Orbison	2:23
9.	"King Of The Beach"		2:08
10.	"Wine, Wine, Wine"		1:58
11.	"Keep On Dancing"	Bobby Fuller, Randy Fuller	1:56
12.	"Bodine"		2:54
13.	"I Fought The Law"	Sonny Curtis	2:16
14.	"She’s My Girl"		2:20
15.	"You Kiss Me"		2:38
16.	"Pamela"		2:05
17.	"Fool of Love"		2:42
18.	"Shakedown"		1:58
19.	"A New Shade of Blue"	Bobby Fuller, Mary Stone	2:55
20.	"Saturday Night"		1:44
21.	"Stringer"		2:25
22.	"You Made Me Cry"		2:02
23.	"Only For You"		2:33
24.	"Nancy Jean"		2:16
25.	"The Chase" "My True Love" (hidden track)	Bobby Fuller and Mary Stone	8:30

Disc 2
No.	Title	Writer(s)	Length
1.	"Unreliable Irresistible Girl"		1:57
2.	"Nervous Breakdown"	Mario Roccuzzo	3:29
3.	"Summertime Blues"	Jerry Capehart, Eddie Cochran	2:02
4.	"I Fought The Law (Alternate)"	Sonny Curtis	2:21
5.	"Do You Wanna Dance?"	Bobby Freeman	2:26
6.	"Nancy Jean"		2:23
7.	"Wolfman"	Bobby Fuller, Randy Fuller	3:07
8.	"Thunder Reef"		2:41
9.	"Keep A Knockin'"	Little Richard	1:56
10.	"Linda Lu"	Ray Sharpe	2:30
11.	"Saturday Night" (Alternate)		1:26
12.	"Guess We’ll Fall in Love" (Alternate)		2:17
13.	"To Make Love Last"		2:01
14.	"Pledge of Love"		2:22
15.	"Take My Word"		2:09
16.	"Skag"	Bobby Fuller, James Reese	2:18
17.	"I Want to Hold Your Hand"	John Lennon, Paul McCartney	2:34
18.	"[Unknown Instrumental]"		3:17
19.	"Greensleaves" (Traditional)		1:54
20.	"You Made Me Cry" (Alternate)		1:59
21.	"Pamela" (Alternate)		2:09
22.	"Donna"	Ritchie Valens	2:16
23.	"Nancy Jean" (Alternate)		2:32
24.	"Only For You" (Alternate)		2:37
25.	"Faraway" "A New Shade of Blue" (Alternate - hidden track)	Bobby Fuller, Mary Stone	10:49

== Personnel ==
- Bobby Fuller - vocals, guitar
- Randy Fuller - backing vocals, bass
- Mike Ciccarelli - backing vocals, guitar
- Tex Reed - backing vocals, guitar
- Sonny Fletchter - backing vocals, guitar
- Jerry Miller - backing vocals, guitar
- Billy Webb - backing vocals, guitar
- Jim Reese - backing vocals, guitar
- Dalton Powell - drums
- Freddy Paz - drums
- Jimmy Wagnon - drums
- DeWayne Quirico - drums on tracks 7, 8, 19, and 21 on Disc 2
