= KRLA King of the Wheels =

Studio album by the Bobby Fuller Four
- Released: November 1965
- Genre: Rock and roll
- Length: 27:45
- Label: Mustang
- Producer: Robert Keane

The Bobby Fuller Four chronology
KRLA King of the Wheels (1965)	I Fought the Law (1966)

Singles from KRLA King of the Wheels
- 1. "Let Her Dance" / "Another Sad and Lonely Night" Released: June 1965; 2. "Never to Be Forgotten" / "You Kiss Me" Released: August 1965

Professional ratings
Review scores
Source	Rating
Allmusic	3/5 stars

KRLA King of the Wheels is the debut studio album by the Bobby Fuller Four. It was released by Mustang Records in November 1965 in stereo and mono. It was released in promotion of the local Los Angeles radio station, KRLA.

== Background ==
The album was put out soon after "Let Her Dance" made the top 40 charts locally. Bob Keane wanted a drag racing album, featuring surf instrumentals, covers, and some singles, however, his original vision changed along the way. In the end, four new drag racer songs were recorded for the album. The title track, "King of the Wheels", is a reworking of an earlier Bobby Fuller song, "King of the Beach". "KRLA Top Eliminator" was based on the real-life customized dragster made by KRLA (seen on the cover), and a reworking of a live cover of "El Paso Rock" by Long John Hunter; Fuller's band used to perform in El Paso. In addition, six songs were also taken from his three latest singles (including "Let Her Dance"), and three new songs were recorded ("Fool of Love" and "Saturday Night" were re-recordings of older Bobby Fuller tracks, and "Little Annie Lou" would go on to become a B-side for their next single, "I Fought the Law"). "The Lonely Dragster" is a reworking of the song "Wolfman", a B-side from a previous single, "Thunder Reef".

In 1990, this album was re-released on CD by Ace Records, bundled with I Fought the Law, along with seven bonus tracks (later put out by Del-Fi Records in 1994). In 1992, Repertoire Records reissued this album on CD with fifteen bonus tracks.

== Track listing ==
All tracks are written by Bobby Fuller, except where noted.

Side one
No.	Title	Writer(s)	Length
1.	"Never to Be Forgotten"	Bobby Fuller, Randy Fuller	2:54
2.	"Another Sad and Lonely Night"		2:17
3.	"She's My Girl"	Bobby Fuller, Randy Fuller	2:27
4.	"Take My Word"		2:05
5.	"Fool of Love"		2:35
6.	"Let Her Dance"		2:25

Side two
No.	Title	Writer(s)	Length
7.	"King of the Wheels"		2:03
8.	"The Lonely Dragster"		3:10
9.	"Little Annie Lou"	Bobby Fuller, Randy Fuller	2:01
10.	"The Phantom Dragster"		1:23
11.	"Saturday Night"		1:37
12.	"KRLA Top Eliminator"	Bobby Fuller, Randy Fuller, Jim Reese, DeWayne Quirico	2:48

=== Bonus tracks ===
Repertoire Records reissue bonus tracks
No.	Title	Writer(s)	Length
13.	"I Fought the Law" (alternate version)	S. Curtis
14.	"Only the Young"
15.	"You Kiss Me" (alternate version)
16.	"Just Pickin' Around"
17.	"Donna"	Ritchie Valens
18.	"Night Train"	Traditional
19.	"You Made Me Cry"
20.	"Guess We'll Fall in Love"
21.	"Angel Face"
22.	"King of the Beach"
23.	"Nervous Breakdown"	M. Roccuzzo
24.	"Peggy Sue/Pamela" (live)	Buddy Holly, J.I. Allison, Norman Petty
25.	"The Lonely Sea/Lolita"
26.	"Keep on Dancing"
27.	"Misirlou"	Traditional

== Personnel ==
=== The Bobby Fuller Four ===
- Bobby Fuller – guitar, lead vocals
- DeWayne Quirico – drums
- Jim Reese – guitar, backing vocals
- Randy Fuller – bass guitar, lead and backing vocals

=== Technical ===
- Robert Keane – producer
