= Dalton Powell =

American drummer (born 1942)

- Born: 1942 (age 82–83)
- Origin: El Paso, Texas, United States
- Genres: Rock; Pop
- Instrument(s): drums, piano
- Years active: 1960–present
- Labels: Yucca Records; Exeter Records; Mustang Records

Dalton Powell (born 1942) is an El Paso musician, perhaps best known for his time as drummer of The Bobby Fuller Four.

== Early career ==
Powell was a childhood friend of Jim Reese. By early 1960, Powell had joined Reese in the band The Embers, playing piano. Later on, Bobby Fuller had joined on drums, and occasionally guitar. The Embers had recorded material on Fuller's reel-to-reel tape recorder in his home. The Embers backed Fuller on his first solo release in 1961, "You're In Love" b/w "Guess We'll Fall In Love". This single was put out by Yucca Records, and became a regional hit. From 1962 on, Powell would occasionally play in Fuller's band and record in his newly constructed home studio. By 1964, Powell and Reese were both permanent members of the band. The band had decided to seek out a major label in Hollywood again; however, Powell was unable to make the move, as he had married and started a family. As a result, Fuller added DeWayne Quirico to the band to fill in drumming duties. Afterwards, the band, now known as The Bobby Fuller Four, was signed by Bob Keane under Del-Fi Records and began putting out records on Mustang Records.

== With The Bobby Fuller Four ==
After the band found success with "I Fought the Law", Quirico was dismissed from the band. Looking for a replacement, Fuller convinced Powell to return to the band in Los Angeles, while John Barbata served as a temporary replacement. While keeping up with touring and live performances, Powell played on the band's follow-up hit single, "Love's Made a Fool of You" peaking at No. 26 on the national charts. Powell's first television appearance with the band was on Hullabaloo on March 21, 1966, playing "I Fought the Law". The next single was "The Magic Touch", which didn't live up to the commercial success of the previous singles.

== Fuller's death ==
By 1966, the band began to decline. Reese had received his draft notice for Vietnam, and Powell planned to quit the band to return home to his family. It was also known that Fuller planned to start a solo career. While scheduling one last band meeting, Fuller ultimately did not attend. The band abruptly disbanded after Fuller was found dead in his mother's Oldsmobile on July 18, 1966. Powell and Reese fled Los Angeles after three armed men came to their apartment looking for Reese, saying they would return. After the initial verdict was made suicide for Fuller's death, Powell opposed this, believing Fuller was incapable of suicide. Later, the cause of death was mysteriously changed to "accident."

== Later works ==
After returning to El Paso, Powell and Reese joined the band Murphy's Law. After they disbanded, both joined Rod Crosby's band, The Intruders. Powell also played with Chuck Berry. In the early 80s, Powell performed with the group the Moon Pie Daince Band.

Throughout the 2000s, Powell was involved in many local musical acts in El Paso, including a tribute act to his former band, the Bobby Fuller Four, known as The Bobby Fuller Faux. In 2009, Powell joined the band Solid Ground.

Powell's Ludwig drum set, with the famous logo created by Boyd Elder was displayed by the El Paso Museum of History in 2008.
