= Let Her Dance =

Single by the Bobby Fuller Four

from the album KRLA King of the Wheels and I Fought the Law
- B-side: "Another Sad and Lonely Night"
- Released: June 1965
- Genre: Pop rock
- Length: 2:34
- Label: Mustang, Liberty
- Songwriter(s): Bobby Fuller
- Producer(s): Bob Keane

The Bobby Fuller Four singles chronology
"Take My Word" (1965)	"Let Her Dance" (1965)	"I Fought the Law" (1965)

"Let Her Dance" is a song by the Bobby Fuller Four. It was the group's fourth single under Del-Fi Records, and the first to achieve national attention.

"Let Her Dance" is a modified version of an earlier Bobby Fuller song, "Keep on Dancing". The modifications came as a result of producer Bob Keane, who slowed it down and added a bottle-tapping rhythm to it (inspired by Fuller's brother Randy tapping to the song with a beer bottle). Randy Fuller was also responsible for remaking the bass line.

The single was first released in June 1965 on Mustang Records, backed with "Another Sad and Lonely Night". While becoming a local hit on the Los Angeles charts, it underperformed on the national charts, missing the Top 100 at No. 133. It was re-released multiple times afterwards (including a release by Liberty Records), but it did little to change its chart status. Despite this, it remained a popular song for the group, and was performed live on Shivaree and Where the Action Is. It was also released on the LP KRLA King of the Wheels in 1965, and later on I Fought the Law in 1966.

== Legacy ==
Since the song was a local hit, the Bobby Fuller Four made a jingle for a Gallenkamp Shoes advertisement, singing to the tune of "Let Her Dance."

The song was covered by Marshall Crenshaw on his 1989 album Good Evening, by Phil Seymour on his 1980 debut album Phil Seymour and by Bobby Fuller Drive (featuring Randy Fuller of the original Bobby Fuller Four). Supergroup Los Super Seven covered it on their 2005 album Heard It on the X featuring lead vocals by Joe Ely.

"Let Her Dance" was also featured on the soundtrack of Wes Anderson's Fantastic Mr. Fox, as well as many greatest hits albums of the Bobby Fuller Four. The song served as the theme music of the Channel 4 sketch comedy program Frankie Boyle's Tramadol Nights.

== Personnel ==
- Bobby Fuller - vocals, guitar
- Randy Fuller - backing vocals, bass guitar
- Jim Reese- backing vocals, guitar
- DeWayne Quirico - drums

== Chart positions ==
Chart (1965)	Peak position
US Singles Chart	133
