= Grammy Award for Best Boxed or Special Limited Edition Package =

Awards for best directors

- Awarded for: quality boxed set or special limited edition packages
- Country: United States
- Presented by: National Academy of Recording Arts and Sciences
- First award: 1995
- Final award: 2025
- Currently held by: Simon Hilton & Sean Ono Lennon – Mind Games (2025)
- Website: grammy.com

The Grammy Award for Best Boxed or Special Limited Edition Package has been presented since 1995 to an album's art directors. The award is not bestowed upon the artist unless they are also a credited art director.

The award year reflects the year of presentation, not the year the work was actually released. The award category has previously been known as Best Recording Package – Boxed (1995–1997) and Best Boxed Recording Package (1998–2002). Usually, five nominees are presented; though in 2016, the number of nominees was six. In 2026, the award was merged into the Best Recording Package category.

Years reflect the year in which the Grammy Awards were presented, for works released in the previous year.

== Recipients ==
Year^{[I]}	Art Director(s)	Work	Performing artist(s)	Nominees Performers are in parentheses	Ref.
1995	Chris Thompson	The Complete Ella Fitzgerald Songbooks	Ella Fitzgerald	Beborah Norcross – Boingo (Oingo Boingo); David Lau – The Complete Bud Powell on Verve (Bud Powell); Chris Bilheimer, Tom Recchion & Michael Stipe – Monster (R.E.M.); Geoff Gans & Coco Shinomiya – Songs of the West (Emmylou Harris)	
1996	Frank Zappa & Gail Zappa	Civilization Phaze III	Frank Zappa	Mark Farrow – Alternative (Pet Shop Boys); Allen Weinberg – Box of Fire (Aerosmith); Storm Thorgerson – Pulse (Pink Floyd); Blind Melon, Jeffery Fey, Chris Jones & Tommy Steele – Soup (Blind Melon)	
1997	Arnold Levine and Chika Azuma	The Complete Columbia Studio Recordings	Miles Davis & Gil Evans	Michael Lang, David Lau & Giulio Turturro – Blues, Boogie, & Bop: The 1940s Mercury Sessions (Various Artists); JoDee Stringham – The Complete Reprise Studio Recordings (Frank Sinatra); Giulio Turturro – The Man from Ipanema (Antônio Carlos Jobim); Chris Bilheimer & Michael Stipe – New Adventures in Hi-Fi (R.E.M.)	
1998	David Gorman, Hugh Brown & Rachel Gutek	Beg Scream and Shout! The Big Ol' Box of '60s Soul	Various Artists	Patricia Lie – The Complete Bill Evans on Verve (Bill Evans); Giulio Turturro – The Complete Ella Fitzgerald & Louis Armstrong on Verve (Ella Fitzgerald and Louis Armstrong); Carol Bobolts, Laurie Goldman & Jack O'Neil – Cuba: I Am Time (Various Artists); Bryan Lasley – Shakedown! The Texas Tapes Revisited (Bobby Fuller)	
1999	Jim Kemp and Virginia Team	The Complete Hank Williams	Hank Williams	Mark Michaelson – The Best of William Burroughs from Giorno Poetry Systems (William Burroughs); Chika Azuma – Ella and Duke at the Cote D'Azur (Ella Fitzgerald and Duke Ellington); Janet Boye & Arnold Levine – The Complete Studio Recordings of The Miles Davis Quintet 1965–1968 (Miles Davis Quintet); Andy Engel & Johnny Lee – Miss Peggy Lee (Peggy Lee)	
2000	Ron Jaramillo & Arnold Levine	Miles Davis – The Complete Bitches Brew Sessions	Miles Davis	Gordon H. Jee – The Blue Note Years – 60th Anniversary Box Set (Various Artists); Giulio Turturro – The Complete Jazz at the Philharmonic on Verve 1944–1949 (Various Artists); James Austin, Hugh Brown & Julie Vlasak – Hot Rods & Custom Classics – Cruisin' Songs & Highway Hits (Various Artists); Hollis King – John Coltrane – The Classic Quartet: The Complete Impulse! Recordings (John Coltrane)	
2001	Arnold Levine & Frank Harkins	The Complete Columbia Recordings 1955–1961	Miles Davis & John Coltrane	Ian Cuttler – The Complete Hot Five and Hot Seven Recordings (Louis Armstrong); Hollis King – The Complete Lester Young Studio Sessions on Verve (Lester Young); Jared Eberhardt, Michael Jager & Todd Wender – Hampton Comes Alive (Phish); Rachel Gutek – Respect: A Century of Women in Music (Various Artists)	
2002	Hugh Brown & Steve Vance	Brain in a Box — The Science Fiction Collection	Various Artists	Christian Calabro – Charlie Parker: The Complete Savoy and Dial Studio Recordings 1944–1948 (Charlie Parker); Dave Bett & Sheri Lee – El Cancionero: Mas y Mas – A History of the Band from East L.A. (Los Lobos); Ron Jaramillo & Adam Owett – Lady Day: The Complete Billie Holiday on Columbia 1933–1944 (Billie Holiday); Carol Bobolts, Jaime Boyle & Deb Schuler – The Long Road to Freedom – An Anthology of Black Music (Various Artists)	
2003	Susan Archie	Screamin' and Hollerin' the Blues: The Worlds of Charley Patton	Charlie Patton	Sevie Bates – Can You Dig It? The '70s Soul Experience (Various Artists); Mary Fagot, Joshua Liberson, George Mimnaugh & Ethan Trask – Capitol Records Sixtieth Anniversary 1942–2002 (Various Artists); Hugh Brown & Julie Vlasak – Like Omigod! The 80s Pop Culture Box (Totally) (Various Artists); Dave Bett & Sheri Lee – Ultra-Lounge – Vegas Baby! (Various Artists)	
2004	Julian Alexander, Howard Fritzson & Seth Rothstein	The Complete Jack Johnson Sessions	Miles Davis	Michael Amzalag, Mathias Augustinyak & Gabríela Friðriksdóttir – Family Tree (Björk); Kathleen Philpott & Mark Tappin – Furious Angels (Rob Dougan); Dave Bett & Sheri Lee – Scarlet's Walk (Tori Amos); Doug Cunningham & Jason Noto – Sing the Sorrow (AFI)	
2005	Stefan Sagmeister	Once in a Lifetime	Talking Heads	Stefan Sagmeister – The Complete Verve Master Takes (Charlie Parker); Susan Archie – Goodbye, Babylon (Various Artists); Michele Horie & Ryan Rogers – The Hip Hop Box (Various Artists); Christine Cano – Unearthed (Johnny Cash)	
2006	Ian Cuttler	The Legend	Johnny Cash	Susan Archie & Noel Waggener – Holy Ghost: Rare & Unissued Recordings (1962–70) (Albert Ayler); Hugh Brown & Jeff Lyons – Pure Genius: The Complete Atlantic Recordings (Ray Charles); Hugh Brown & Sheryl Farber – Weird Tales of the Ramones (Ramones); Howard Fritzson & Michelle Holme – You Ain't Talkin' to Me — Charlie Poole and the Roots of Country Music (Charlie Poole with Various Artists)	
2007	Flea, John Frusciante, Anthony Kiedis, Chad Smith & Matt Taylor	Stadium Arcadium	Red Hot Chili Peppers	Howard Fritzson, Dan Ichimoto & Seth Rothstein – The Cellar Door Sessions 1970 (Miles Davis); Susan Archie & Henry Owings – Fonotone Records (Various Artists); Hugh Brown & Jean Krikorian – A Life Less Lived — The Gothic Box (Various Artists); Hugh Brown, Sheryl Farber & Maria Villar – One Kiss Can Lead to Another: Girl Group Sounds Lost & Found (Various Artists)	
2008	Masaki Koike	What It Is! Funky Soul and Rare Grooves (1967–1977)	Various Artists	Matt Taylor, Ellen Wakayama & Gerard Way – The Black Parade – Special Edition (My Chemical Romance); Alex Kirzhner – A Fever You Can't Sweat Out – Limited Edition Collectible Deluxe Box (Panic! at the Disco); Stan Chow – Icky Thump – Limited Edition USB Flash Drive (The White Stripes); Matt Taylor & Valo – Venus Doom (HIM)	
2009	Stanley Donwood, Mel Maxwell and Xiaan Munro	In Rainbows	Radiohead	Trent Reznor & Rob Sheridan – Ghosts I–IV (Nine Inch Nails); Qing-Yang Xiao – Poems & Songs (Wu Sheng); Alex Kirzhner & Panic! at the Disco – Pretty. Odd. (Panic! at the Disco); Aimee Mann & Gail Marowitz – @#%&*! Smilers (Aimee Mann)	
2010	Gary Burden, Jenice Heo and Neil Young	The Archives Vol. 1 1963–1972	Neil Young	Mathieu Bitton and Scott Webber – A Cabinet of Curiosities (Jane's Addiction); Masaki Koike – The Clifford Ball (Phish); Stefan Sagmeister – Everything That Happens Will Happen Today (David Byrne & Brian Eno); Jordan Butcher – Lost in the Sound of Separation (Deluxe Edition) (Underoath)	
2011	Rob Jones & Jack White	Under Great White Northern Lights (Limited Edition Box Set)	The White Stripes	Tom Lunt, Rob Sevier & Ken Shipley – Light: On the South Side (Various Artists); Jeff Anderson & Vaughan Oliver – Minotaur (Deluxe Edition) (The Pixies); Daniel Reiss & Klaus Voormann – A Sideman's Journey (Limited Collector's Super Deluxe Box Set) (Klaus Voormann); Qing-Yang Xiao – Story Island (Various Artists)	
2012	Dave Bett & Michelle Holme	The Promise: The Darkness on the Edge of Town Story	Bruce Springsteen	Donald Twain & Zachariah Wildwood – The King of Limbs (Radiohead); Matt Taylor & Ellen Wakayama – 25th Anniversary Music Box (Danny Elfman & Tim Burton); James Spindler – 25 Years (Sting); David Gorman – Wingless Angels – Deluxe Edition (Wingless Angels)	
2013	Fritz Klaetke	Woody at 100: The Woody Guthrie Centennial Collection	Woody Guthrie	Rob Sheridan – The Girl with the Dragon Tattoo (Soundtrack from the Motion Picture) (Trent Reznor & Atticus Ross); Liz Kweller – Go Fly a Kite (Ben Kweller); Simon Earith & James Musgrave – Ram (Paul McCartney Archive Collection - Deluxe Edition) (Paul McCartney & Linda McCartney); Stephen Kennedy – Some Girls: Super Deluxe Edition (The Rolling Stones)	
2014	Simon Earith and James Musgrave	Wings Over America (Deluxe Edition)	Paul McCartney & Wings	Charles Dooher & Scott Sandler – The Brussels Affair (The Rolling Stones); Mayer Hawthorne – How Do You Do (Limited Edition Box Set) (Mayer Hawthorne); Ross Stirling – The Road to Red Rocks (Special Edition) (Mumford & Sons); Masaki Koike – The Smith Tapes (Various Artists)	
2015	Susan Archie, Dean Blackwood & Jack White	The Rise & Fall of Paramount Records, Volume One (1917-27)	Various Artists	Leland Meiners & Ken Shipley – Cities of Darkscorch (Various Artists); Gary Burden & Jenice Heo – A Letter Home (Vinyl Box Set) (Neil Young); Andy Carne – Sparks (Deluxe Album Box Set) (Imogen Heap); Jessica Dessner, Lisa Glines, Doran Tyson & Steve Vance – Spring 1990 (The Other One) (Grateful Dead)	
2016	Susan Archie, Dean Blackwood & Jack White	The Rise & Fall of Paramount Records, Volume Two (1928-32)	Various Artists	Leif Podhajsky – Beneath the Skin (Deluxe Box Set) (Of Monsters and Men); Sasha Barr & Josh Tillman – I Love You, Honeybear (Limited Edition Deluxe Vinyl) (Father John Misty); Stephen Kennedy & James Tilley – Sticky Fingers (Super Deluxe Edition) (The Rolling Stones); Doran Tyson & Steve Vance – 30 Trips Around the Sun (Grateful Dead); Carson Ellis, Jeri Heiden & Glen Nakasako – What a Terrible World, What a Beautiful World (Deluxe Box Set) (The Decemberists)	
2017	Gérard Lo Monaco	Edith Piaf 1915–2015	Edith Piaf	Jonathan Dagan & Mathias Host Normark – 401 Days (J.Views); Samuel Burgess-Johnson & Matthew Healy – I Like It When You Sleep, for You Are So Beautiful yet So Unaware of It (Box Set) (The 1975); Matt Taylor – Paper Wheels (Deluxe Limited Edition) (Trey Anastasio); Simon Earith & James Musgrave – Tug of War (Deluxe Edition) (Paul McCartney)	
2018	Lawrence Azerrad, Timothy Daly & David Pescovitz	The Voyager Golden Record: 40th Anniversary Edition	Various Artists	Tim Breen – Bobo Yeye: Belle Epoque in Upper Volta (Various Artists); Tom Hingston – Lovely Creatures: The Best of Nick Cave and the Bad Seeds (Nick Cave and the Bad Seeds); Masaki Koike – May 1977: Get Shown the Light (Grateful Dead); Tim Breen, Benjamin Marra & Ken Shipley – Warfaring Strangers: Acid Nightmares (Various Artists)	
2019	Meghan Foley, Annie Stoll & Al Yankovic	Squeeze Box: The Complete Works of "Weird Al" Yankovic	"Weird" Al Yankovic	Arian Buhler, Charles Dooher, Jeff Fura, Scott Sandler & Matt Taylor – Appetite For Destruction (Locked 'n Loaded Box) (Guns N' Roses); Carson Ellis, Jeri Heiden & Glen Nakasako – I'll Be Your Girl (The Decemberists); Lisa Glines, Doran Tyson & Roy Henry Vickers – Pacific Northwest '73–'74: The Complete Recordings (Grateful Dead); Sarah Dodds & Shauna Dodds – Too Many Bad Habits (Johnny Nicholas)	
2020	Masaki Koike	Woodstock – Back to the Garden: The Definitive 50th Anniversary Archive	Various Artists	Stanley Donwood & Tchocky – Anima (Thom Yorke); Amanda Chiu, Mark Farrow & David Gray – Gold in Brass Age (David Gray); Josh Cheuse – 1963: New Directions (John Coltrane); Marek Polewski – The Radio Recordings 1939-1945 (Wilhelm Furtwängler & Berliner Philharmoniker)	
2021	Lawrence Azerrad & Jeff Tweedy	Ode to Joy	Wilco	Linn Wie Andersen, Simon Earith, Paul McCartney & James Musgrave – Flaming Pie (Collector's Edition) (Paul McCartney); Lisa Glines & Doran Tyson – Giants Stadium 1987, 1989, 1991 (Grateful Dead); Jeff Schulz – Mode (Depeche Mode); Michael Cina & Molly Smith – The Story of Ghostly International (Various Artists)	
2022	Darren Evans, Dhani Harrison & Olivia Harrison	All Things Must Pass: 50th Anniversary Edition	George Harrison	Lordess Foudre & Christopher Leckie – Color Theory (Soccer Mommy); Simon Moore – The Future Bites (Limited Edition Box Set) (Steven Wilson); Dan Calderwood & Jon King – 77-81 (Gang of Four); Ramón Coronado & Marshall Rake – Swimming in Circles (Mac Miller)	
2023	Lisa Glines, Doran Tyson & Dave Van Patten	In and Out of the Garden: Madison Square Garden '81, '82, '83	Grateful Dead	Josh Abrahams, Steve Berman, Jimmy Iovine, John Janick & Jason Sangerman - Artists Inspired by Music: Interscope Reimagined (Various Artists); Berit Gwendolyn Gilma - Big Mess (Danny Elfman); Jenny Krackenberger & Anna McCaleb - Black Pumas (Collector's Edition Box Set) (Black Pumas); Paul Sahre, John Flansburgh, Brian Karlsson & John Linnell - Book (They Might Be Giants)	
2024	Jeri Heiden & John Heidon	For the Birds: The Birdsong Project	Various Artists	Jeff Mangum, Daniel Murphy & Mark Ohe - The Collected Works of Neutral Milk Hotel (Neutral Milk Hotel); Duy Dao - Gieo (Ngot); Bo Burnham & Daniel Calderwood - Inside (Deluxe Box Set) (Bo Burnham); Masaki Koike - Words & Music, May 1965 (Deluxe Edition) (Lou Reed)	
2025	Simon Hilton & Sean Ono Lennon	Mind Games	John Lennon	Nick Azinas & Mike Hicks - Half Living Things (Alpha Wolf); Kate Bush & Albert McIntosh - Hounds of Love - The Boxes of Lost at Sea (Kate Bush); Doug Cunningham & Jason Noto - In Utero (Nirvana); Takahiro Kurashima & Marek Polewski - Unsuk Chin (Unsuk Chin & Berliner Philharmoniker); Rebeka Arce & Farbod Kokaki - We Blame Chicago (90 Day Men)	
