= The El Caminos =

Japanese surf music band

- Origin: Kobe, Japan
- Genre: Surf music
- Years active: 1994 to present
- Labels: Sexcite Records, Del-Fi, Green Cookie Records
- Members: Eddie Ugata
- Past members: Eddie Ugata; Ritchi Kohda; Aki Mai; Bingo Matsumoto
- Website: http://poison.kiss.ac

The El Caminos are a Japanese surf music band who were formed in the 1990s. They had an album that charted in the late 1990s.

== Background ==
They have been described as a band that peruses the sounds of surf music from the 1960s without limits. They were formed in Japan by Eddie Ugata of the L.S.D.s. Ugata who is said to be authority on 1960s surf music and vintage guitar collector formed The El Cominos in 1994 out of what remained of his previous group. They did quite well on the Kansai garage scene and debuted with Knock 'Em Out. The group is made up of both male and female musicians. Described as Japanese surf freaks, their surf guitar album, Reverb Explosion! was their first release in the US. Fronted by Eddie Ugata on rhythm guitar, they were discovered by Bob Keene of Del-Fi Records. As of 1997, they were only using Fender, Danelectro, and Vox guitars. The amps were Fender as well. Their material has been described as mostly classic oldies with some originals thrown in. "Rolling Sushi" is one of them. They had a #1 on a US college chart.

== Career ==
=== 1990s ===
In 1996, they released their second album Surfer's Lounge, which managed to get the attention of overseas surf fans. It was reported in the July 26, 1997 issue of Billboard that the El Cominos, Del-Fi's latest surf music catalogue addition were to have their Reverb Explosion! album released on the 5th the following month. By August 29, the album had dropped from its position of 13 to 28 on the Gavin College chart. By September 5, the album was down to 32. In October, it was at #65 on the Top 75 Alternative Airplay chart. It peaked at #12 on the CMJ Core Radio chart.

=== 2000s ===
In 2006 their album Beatrama was released on the Vivid Sound label. In June, 2016, they played the Surfer Joe Summer Festival, appearing on the Tiki Stage. Also that year, the compilation album, Complete Sexcite Works was released. It contained their albums, Knock ‘Em Out and Surfers Lounge, both released on the Sexcite Records label. It also included two bonus tracks. Another album was released that year. This time on the Green Cookie Records label. The mostly instrumental album Behind the Surf was made up of unreleased recordings, and included five alternative versions. Among the songs were covers of "Gandy Dancer" by The Ventures, "Our Favorite Martian" by Bobby Fuller & the Fanatics, "Shock Wave" by Zorba & the Greeks, "Bikini Drag" by The Pyramids, and "Rebel Rouser" by Duane Eddy. In August 2017, they played at the Tiki Oasis festival, appearing on the Lanai Stage at the Grand Hanalei Ballroom at the Crowne Plaza. Just prior to the festival they played at the Longboard Margarita Bar in Pacifica, CA with SF Bay surf group, The Mach IV which once included Hot Tuna drummer Shigemi Komiyama.

== Discography ==
Albums
Act	Title	Catalogue	Year	Notes #
The El Caminos	Knock 'Em Out	Sexcite Records ALCA-5044	1995	
The El Caminos	Surfers' Lounge	Sexcite Records ALCA-5072	1996	
The El Caminos	Reverb Explosion!	Del-Fi DFCD 71260	1997	
The El Caminos	Beatrama	Del-Fi EFST-1006	2006	
The El Caminos	The Complete Sexcite Works	Clinck Records CRCD5077	2013	Compilation
The El Caminos	Behind The Surf	Green Cookie Records GC054/SE004	2016	
