= I Fought the Law (album) =

1966 studio album by the Bobby Fuller Four

Studio album by The Bobby Fuller Four
- Released: February 1966
- Recorded: 1965
- Genre: Rock and roll
- Length: 28:13
- Label: Mustang; Mustang M-901 (mono); MS-901 (stereo)
- Producer: Robert Keane

The Bobby Fuller Four chronology
KRLA King of the Wheels (1965)	I Fought the Law (1966)	The Bobby Fuller Memorial Album (1968)

Singles from I Fought the Law
- 1. "I Fought the Law" / "Little Annie Lou" Released: October 1965

Professional ratings
Review scores
Source	Rating
AllMusic	3/5 stars
The Encyclopedia of Popular Music	3/5 stars

I Fought the Law is the second and final studio album by The Bobby Fuller Four. It was released by Mustang Records in February 1966 in stereo and mono. Its title comes from the title track, "I Fought the Law", which had recently become a hit single for the group, eventually charting at #9 on the Billboard Hot 100.

== Background ==
The album was released as a response to "I Fought the Law"'s impressive chart performance, featuring a re-recorded version of the song on stereo copies of the album (in which Fuller slyly inserts a certain four-letter word in place of the word "fun"). The song was written by Sonny Curtis and had been previously released on The Crickets first album without Buddy Holly, In Style with the Crickets. In addition, the album recycles seven songs from Fuller's previous album KRLA King of the Wheels, including the band's previous hit single, "Let Her Dance" and "I Fought the Law"'s B-side, "Little Annie Lou". Many songs are also reworkings of older songs recorded by Bobby Fuller in his home studio in El Paso, including "I Fought the Law", "Julie" and "Only When I Dream" are new songs. "She's My Girl" is listed on the front cover but does not appear on this album as it did on the first.

I Fought the Law became the group's only Billboard charted album, peaking at #144 in April 1966.

== Track listing ==
All tracks are written by Bobby Fuller, except where noted.

Side one
No.	Title	Writer(s)	Length
1.	"Let Her Dance"		2:28
2.	"Julie"	Chip Taylor	2:20
3.	"A New Shade of Blue"		2:53
4.	"Only When I Dream"	Bobby Fuller, Mary Stone Huffman	2:15
5.	"You Kiss Me"	Bobby Fuller, Mary Stone Huffman	2:32
6.	"Little Annie Lou"	Bobby Fuller, Randy Fuller	1:59

Side two
No.	Title	Writer(s)	Length
7.	"I Fought the Law"	Sonny Curtis	2:17
8.	"Another Sad and Lonely Night"		2:15
9.	"Saturday Night"		1:40
10.	"Take My Word"		2:05
11.	"Fool of Love"		2:35
12.	"Never to Be Forgotten"	Bobby Fuller, Randy Fuller	2:54

== Personnel ==
=== The Bobby Fuller Four ===
- Bobby Fuller – guitar, lead vocals
- DeWayne Quirico – drums
- Jim Reese – guitar, backing vocals
- Randy Fuller – bass guitar, backing vocals

=== Technical ===
- Robert Keane – producer
