= I Fought the Law (disambiguation) =

"I Fought the Law" is a song written by Sonny Curtis of the Crickets and recorded by several artists

I Fought the Law may also refer to:

- I Fought the Law (album), a 1966 album by The Bobby Fuller Four
- I Fought the Law (TV series), 2025
- "I Fought the Law" (Station 19), a 2019 television episode
- I Fought the Law (Never Mind The Buzzcocks), a television quiz show segment
