= Jim Reese (musician) =

- Jim Reese performing "I Fought the Law" on Hullabaloo.

Background information
- Born: James Gordon Reese, Jr. December 7, 1941; Amarillo, Texas, United States
- Origin: El Paso, Texas, United States
- Died: October 26, 1991 (aged 49) Lufkin, Texas, United States
- Genres: Rock; Pop
- Instruments: Guitar, piano, backing vocals, bass
- Years active: 1958–1991
- Labels: Yucca Records; Exeter Records; Donna Records; Mustang Records; Liberty Records
- Formerly of: The Bobby Fuller Four

James Gordon Reese, Jr., simply known as Jim Reese, (December 7, 1941 – October 26, 1991) was an American musician and a longtime member of the famed rock and roll band, The Bobby Fuller Four. Being virtuosic at a variety of instruments, he is perhaps best known for his guitar work (both lead and rhythm). He provided backing vocals and rhythm guitar to the Bobby Fuller Four's hit, "I Fought the Law."

== Early career ==
An aspiring guitarist, Reese was initially turned down by the Rock Kings, a local El Paso band, before joining the Counts in April 1958. At this point, Reese was playing piano with the group, and was featured on their first release, "Thunder," in October 1958 (Reese and The Bobby Fuller Four covered this track as "Thunder Reef"). For their next release in 1959, "Child of Fortune," Reese switched to rhythm guitar.

Eventually, Reese broke away and headed his own band, the Embers, after internal arguments within The Counts polarized band members. Former Counts bands mates Googie Dirmeyer and Jerry Bright returned to The Embers. Under the name the Royal Lancers, the group evolved for two years, and Reese soon found his calling as a lead guitarist in El Paso. Notable members of the Embers included Howard Steele on bass, Dalton Powell on piano, and Bobby Fuller on drums.

By 1961, Fuller sought to head his own band, and recorded his first single, featuring him on vocals and guitar for the first time, while backed by Reese the Embers. Recorded in Fuller's parent's living room on a Viking recorder, the single was released as "You're in Love" in November 1961. It became a regional hit, peaking at No. 1 at KELP. Fuller later left the Embers to start his own band.

Fuller quickly achieved success through independently recorded and released singles. He first contacted Reese to play with the band in 1962, where he remained until 1963, when Fuller began playing with a different set of musicians (Billy Webb on guitar, and Larry Thompson on drums). When Fuller got more serious about getting the band a deal with Del-Fi Records in late 1964, Reese re-joined the band at Fuller personally asked him and Powell. For the rest of this period, Fuller and Reese switched off playing lead and rhythm guitar. By the end of the year, the band made the move to California.

== Success With Del-Fi Records ==
This time around, Bob Keane, head of Del-Fi records saw great potential in the band, and signed them to his label. The band put out their initial release on Del-Fi's Donna label before releasing on Mustang Records, started up by Keane with Fuller's group specifically in mind.

Before the group had been formally named, they went through a number of different temporary names under which they released their first records, until finally settling on the Bobby Fuller Four. Reese had been opposed to the name, as it suggests a higher role for Fuller, despite the rest of the band contributing equally. Despite this, the band achieved great success with their following singles, starting with "Let Her Dance" in June 1965. The band's biggest hit followed with "I Fought the Law", featuring Reese providing rhythm guitar and backing vocals. Reese contributed to both of the band's studio albums, KRLA King of the Wheels and I Fought the Law in 1965 and 1966, respectively. Reese appeared alongside the rest of the band in The Ghost in the Invisible Bikini in 1966. Reese was stuck miming keyboard, as there were not two guitars on set (the one available went to Bobby). Reese has also criticized the Vox equipment they were forced to use, and the unauthorized use of his likeness to advertise Vox products.

== Fuller's death and afterwards ==
The band was experiencing tensions following an under promoted tour and production changes in 1966. Upon returning home, Reese found a draft notice as this was during the Vietnam War. He planned to sell his Jaguar XKE to Fuller after the next band meeting on July 18, 1966. After Fuller failed to show up, it appeared that something was wrong. Fuller was mysteriously later found dead in his mother's Oldsmobile, apparently due to asphyxiation.

Four days later, three armed men came to the apartment Reese shared with drummer Dalton Powell, looking for Reese. While no conclusions have been made, Reese assumed it had to do with an insurance policy taken out on his life, possibly connected to Fuller's death (whose policy was worth between $800,000 and $1 million).

Afterwards, Reese stepped out of the spotlight and settled down in Lufkin, Texas, where he would spend the rest of his life. On October 26, 1991, after playing a round of golf, Reese suffered a fatal heart attack as he was returning to his truck. He is buried in the Garden of Memories cemetery.

== Equipment ==
=== Guitars ===
Reese was always strongly in favor of Gibson products. His guitar of choice was Gibson ES-335, which he used most commonly. Other guitars he used include Fender Duo-Sonic (early on), Fender Stratocaster, and Gibson Hummingbird (which actually belonged to Fuller). Reese's Gibson ES-335 was stolen after his death. Reese said that he preferred Gibson guitars to Fender, and had only used Fender guitars in the absence of his Gibson. He has also criticized Vox equipment.

== Discography ==
With Bob Taylor and The Counts

- "Thunder" / "Taylor's Rock" (1958)
- "Don't Be Unfair" / "Child of Fortune" (1959)

With Jerry Bright and The Embers

- "Almost Blue" / "Jim's Jive" (1961)
- "Be Mine" / "I'll Always Be" (1962)

With Bobby Fuller

- "You're in Love" / "Guess We'll Fall in Love" (1961)
- "I Fought The Law" / "She's My Girl" (1964) (B-side only)
- "Saturday Night" / "Stringer" (1964)

With Jerry Bright

- "Rosie" / "Indian Giver" (1962)

With The Counts

- "Chug-A-Lug" / "Surfer's Paradise" (1963)

With Bobby Fuller and the Fanatics

- "Fool of Love" / "Shakedown" (1964)
- "Those Memories of You" / "Our Favorite Martian" (1964)

With The Shindigs

- "Thunder Reef" / "Wolfman" (1965)

With The Bobby Fuller Four

- "Take My Word" / "She's My Girl" (1965)
- "Let Her Dance" / "Another Sad and Lonely Night" (1965)
- "Never to Be Forgotten" / "You Kiss Me" (1965)
- "I Fought The Law" / "Little Annie Lou" (1965)
- "Love's Made a Fool of You" / "Don't Ever Let Me Know" (1966)
- "The Magic Touch" / "My True Love" (1966)

With Murphy's Law

- "How Can I Miss You" / "Weekend Lady" (1983)
