= The Gallahads =

American band

- Origin: Seattle, Washington, United States
- Genres: Doo-wop; R&B
- Years active: 1952–1962
- Labels: Nite; Del-Fi
- Past members: Jimmy Pipkin; Bobby Dixon "Tiny" Tony Smith; Ernie Rouse; Leo Robinson; Ray Robinson; Charles Wright

The Gallahads were an American doo-wop band formed in Seattle, Washington, in 1952. The band released three singles during its existence and were popular particularly in Los Angeles, California for their song, "(I'm Just A) Lonely Guy." However, over the years, their 1965 recording Keeper of Dreams (which did not chart at the time) has become a Doo-Wop classic. The group formed as the vocal ensemble, the Echoes, in 1952, when the band members were enrolled in Edmond Meany Junior High School, and performed in a local teen club called the Strokers, among other venues. Initially, the band went through several personnel changes, but the solidified line-up included Jimmy Pipkin (lead vocals, piano), Bobby Dixon (first tenor), "Tiny" Tony Smith (second tenor), and Ernie Rouse (baritone). In 1957, the group, now going by the moniker, the Gallahads, performed their original tune, "Gone", over the telephone to DJ Steve Wray. Impressed, Wray became the band's first manager, buying them matching white outfits, and arranging performances at the Catholic Youth Organization—which were, at the time, some of the only teen dances allowed in Seattle. In one of their gigs, record producers Larry Nelson and Chuck Markulis, owners of Nite Records, saw the Gallahads and immediately signed the band, after recently issuing the label's debut record, "Love You So", by Ron Holden and the Thunderbirds.

A recording of "Gone" and another original song, "So Lonely", were complete in Northwest Recorders, in the summer of 1959. However, local radio stations would not play the tracks. Nonetheless, the band demoed another composition, "(I'm Just A) Lonely Guy", and passed the recording over to Bob Keane of Del-Fi/Donna Records. In September 1959, the Gallahads relocated to Los Angeles, signed to a five-year contract with the record label, and re-recorded the song, along with "Jo Jo the Big Wheel". In February 1960, the two songs were issued as a single on the Donna label, and in August 1960 it was also released on the Del-Fi label. On August 15, 1960, "Lonely Guy" bubbled under the Hot 100 at number 111, reached number four on Cashbox, and spent ten weeks at number one on Los Angeles's KFWB Fabulous Forty.

By the time of the Gallahads' next release, Smith and Dixon had departed, and were replaced by Leo Robinson, Ray Robinson, and Charles Wright, who would later go on to lead the Watts 103rd Street Rhythm Band. The new line-up was featured weekly on the Wink Martindale Show for a few months, and appeared on American Bandstand. In 1961, the group's second single "Without A Girlfriend" was released and received extensive airplay in Los Angeles. However, after a performance managed by DJ Alan Freed, the band was not compensated and filed a complaint against Freed. Freed had the single pulled from any further promotion. In addition, the B-side "Be Fair" was met with resistance by radio stations for its lyrics pertaining to a blind man. After returning to Seattle, the band, under the billing Jimmy Pipkin and the Gallahads, released a third and final single, "This Letter To You" in 1962, but it was largely ignored. The band performed at the Seattle World's Fair, but disbanded by the end of the year.

Pipkins continued to perform with a variation of line-ups under the Gallahads' name, and occasionally, the first time of which was 1974, the original members reunited. Smith formed a R&B group called the Statics, which morphed into the psychedelic rock band, International Brick. The band released the single "Flower Children" in 1968.
