= Uzeda =

Italian underground rock band

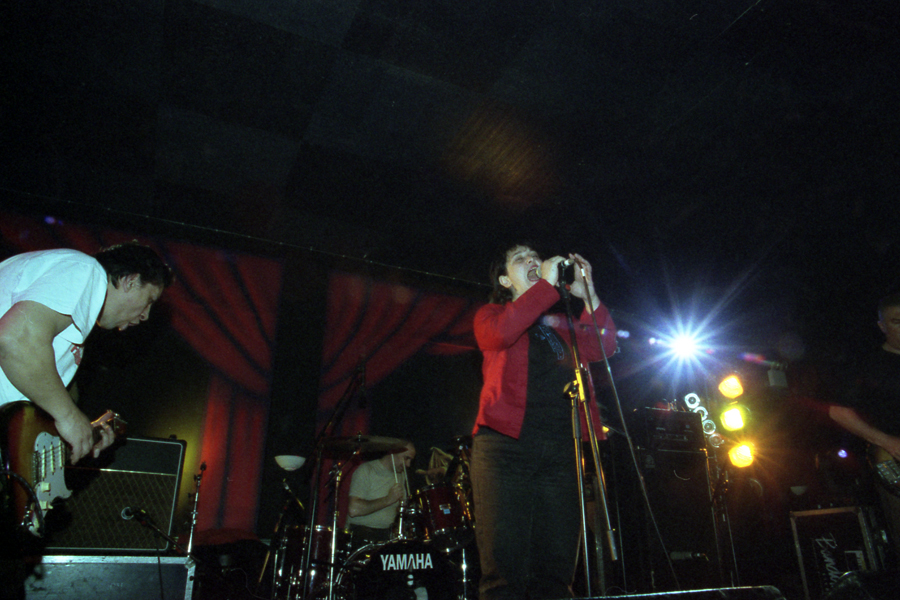
- All Tomorrow's Parties, 2004

Background information
- Origin: Catania, Sicily, Italy
- Genres: Alternative rock, math rock, noise rock
- Years active: 1987–present
- Labels: Touch and Go
- Spinoffs: Bellini
- Members: Giovanna Cacciola; Agostino Tilotta; Vincenzo Virgillito; Davide Oliveri
- Past members: Giovanni Nicosia Raffaele Gulisano
- Website: uzedatheband.com

Uzeda is an Italian underground rock group founded in Catania, Sicily, in 1987 by lead singer Giovanna Cacciola, guitarists Agostino Tilotta and Giovanni Nicosia, bassist Raffaele Gulisano and drummer Davide Oliveri.

Steve Albini met the band after the release of their first album Out of Colours and they became great friends; from that moment he recorded all their records except for The Peel Sessions.

In 1994 the band was invited to the John Peel Show on BBC, from that recordings was published an album and, at the end of the year, Nicosia left the band.

After the live tour promoting Different Section Wires, the band went on a lengthy hiatus, and Cacciola and Tilotta subsequently formed Bellini, along with drummer Damon Che from Don Caballero, and bassist Matthew Taylor releasing Snowing Sun on Monitor Records and Palace Records. Replaced Damon Che with Alexis Fleisig (Girls Against Boys), Bellini released Small Stones and The Precious Prize of Gravity on Temporary Residence Limited. During this period, Oliveri and Gulisano recorded the 2001 album Aria with Gianna Nannini, as well as music for Enzo D'Alò's animated cartoon Momo alla conquista del tempo.

In 2006, Uzeda came back with a new album, Stella, recorded again by Steve Albini.

== Members ==
- Giovanna Cacciola - vocals (1987—present)
- Agostino Tilotta - guitar (1987—present)
- Giovanni Nicosia - guitar (1987—1994)
- Raffaele Gulisano - bass (1987—2024)
- Vincenzo Virgillito - bass (2024-present)
- Davide Oliveri - drums (1987—present)

== Discography ==
- Out of Colours, 1991, A.V. Arts
- Waters, 1993, A.V. Arts
- The Peel Sessions, 1994, Strange Fruit Records
- 4, 1995, Touch and Go Records
- Different Section Wires, 1998, Touch and Go Records
- Stella, 2006, Touch and Go Records
- Quocumque jeceris stabit, 2019, Temporary Residence Limited
