= Insect Surfers =

American surf music band

- Origin: Washington, D.C.; Los Angeles, California, USA
- Genres: Surf rock, indie rock, instrumental rock, new wave, punk, psychedelic rock
- Years active: 1979–present
- Labels: Marlin Records, Green Cookie Records, Skyclad Records, Dionysus Records, WASP Records
- Members: David Arnson; Jonpaul Balak; Christopher Roberts; Michael Abraham; Marty Tippens
- Past members: ^{Washington, DC} David Petersen; Michael Duke; Dan Buccino; Robert Fass; Josh Arnson; Jeff Zeldman; Drew Vogelman; Tom Tomlinson; Alberto Bellorin; Jim Colby; Todd Bernhardt^{Los Angeles} Daniel Sullivan; Richard D’Andrea; Michael Parma; Michael O’Neil; Jim Sciurba; Steve Bidrowski; Dan Valentie; Jeff Utterback; Michael Gregan; Adrien Anthony
- Website: www.insectsurfers.com

The Insect Surfers are an American band formed in Washington, D.C., in 1979. The group bills itself "Planet Earth’s Longest-Running Modern Surf Band," and has been based out of Los Angeles, California since 1986. Inspired by the psychedelic surf sounds of the 1960s, their instrumental music is propelled by the energy of the punk movement that surrounded them at birth. Founder David Arnson has been the mainstay of the band's sound through numerous personnel changes over the decades. They are sometimes grouped into the category of "second wave" surf, the first wave being that of the 1960s originators (such as Dick Dale, The Bel-Airs, and The Surfaris), and the third wave being the scores of bands inspired by mid-1990s interest sparked by the soundtrack of Quentin Tarantino's movie Pulp Fiction. Insect Surfers have performed shows all over the US and Europe. Their music has appeared in videos and television shows, and along with a score of their own releases they have been featured on dozens of compilations. While only about a third of their music lacked vocals during their DC incarnations, after Arnson relocated to Los Angeles the band shifted focus to perform primarily instrumental tunes.

== The DC years ==
Insect Surfers was formed by two Bethesda-Chevy Chase High School friends, David Arnson and David Petersen, while both were attending the University of Maryland. In 1979, the pair began composing songs on un-electrified electric guitars in Petersen's bedroom. After writing a number of songs, they recruited fellow high school friend Robert Fass on bass. Drummer Dan Buccino, who was just graduating from Walt Whitman High School, was found through a classified ad in the free Washington, DC newspaper Unicorn Times. By this point, they’d decided on the name Insect Surfers, inspired by a cartoon Arnson had doodled in the margins of a practice test for his chemistry class. Shortly thereafter, they met keyboard/synth player Mike Duke while waiting in line to see the premiere of the sci-fi movie Alien. Their mutual friend Dan Collins, graduating BCC High School that year, wanted to put together a musical performance for his public speaking class. The first incarnation of the band was a one-shot performance as "Rinse 'n' Vac" in the classroom, featuring one of Collins’ Wire-influenced songs and several Insect Surfer songs.

Although Collins did not continue in the group, the rest of the band carried on to play their first gig as Insect Surfers at Fort Reno Park in the Tenleytown neighborhood of Northwest DC. However, this show was unfortunately rained out. The first complete Insect Surfers gig featured the band opening for Bad Brains at Madam's Organ in June 1979, and their next gig was opening for DC's first punk band, The Slickee Boys at Fort Reno. In October 1979 they opened for The B-52's. At one of their several Madam's Organ gigs, Insect Surfers met Bill Asp, who agreed to release the band's first single on his Arlington, VA-based label, WASP Records. Asp also became the band's manager.

As bassist Robert Fass had returned to college, Arnson took over bass duties for the next couple years, while still composing songs on guitar. WASP released the Insects’ single "Into the Action" b/w "Pod Life" in 1980, followed by their 12" record "Wavelength," which reached #25 on the national college radio charts. This success saw the Insect Surfers playing frequently; over the next four years they performed with the likes of Iggy Pop, Joan Jett, The Stranglers, Psychedelic Furs, Echo & the Bunnymen, Destroy All Monsters, The Ventures, The Raybeats, Snakefinger, and The Waitresses. Frequent Boston appearances found them opening for such local favorites as Mission of Burma, Human Sexual Response, and the Lyres. They were the first DC punk band to break out of the local scene into national touring, while also becoming a frequent fixture in DC's seminal punk/new wave clubs, such as Madam's Organ, DC Space, 9:30 Club, One Flight Up, and The Bayou.

Buccino and Duke both left the band to attend college in 1981; Buccino, along with Petersen and Fass, occasionally performed together as "Davey Con Carne", and Duke, with his own project "Kuru". Arnson kept Insect Surfers going with his brother Josh Arnson on bass, Tom Tomlinson on keyboard (although Jeff Zeldman contributed keyboards for a few months before Tomlinson), and Drew Vogelman on drums. "Sting Ray"/"Spin"—a DJ-only 7" with Duke returning on keyboards—was released in 1982, and Sonar Safari—a six-song 12" with Tomlinson on keyboards—was released in 1983. Constant touring led to the departure of drummer Vogelman, who was briefly replaced by Alberto Bellorin. The final DC lineup consisted of David Arnson (guitar), Tom Tomlinson (keyboards), Jim Colby (bass), and Todd Bernhardt (drums).

== The Los Angeles years ==
A move to Los Angeles in April 1985 found Arnson trying out musicians for the band's new Southern California lineup, which made their debut in June 1986 at KXLU's "Surf Day," where they performed with local favorites The Halibuts. Insect Surfers’ lineup for this show was David Arnson (guitar), Mike Parma (drums), an unknown bassist, and Danny "Dano" Sullivan (guitar), who Arnson had connected with through a call for members on KXLU's show "Surf Wave" the previous November. This gig was later obliquely referenced in a song by the Surf Punks, "…And Then The Cops Came."

Insect Surfers’ album Reverb Sun was recorded in 1989, but it took until 1991 for Skyclad Records to release it as an LP and CD. Lineup by this time was Arnson and Sullivan on guitars, Mike O’Neil on bass, and John Convertino (later of Giant Sand and Calexico) on drums.

East West was a 1992 10" vinyl release on Dionysus Records, and—like the Paul Butterfield Blues Band release of the same name—it included an extended jam as its last cut. Personnel was David Arnson and Dan Sullivan on guitars, Dan Valentie (of the band The Boardwalkers, and formerly a member of garage revival bands The Unclaimed and Thee Fourgiven) on bass, and Jeff Utterback on drums. Bassist Mike O’Neil and drummer Steve Bidrowski (formerly of The Unknowns and Denver Mexicans) were featured on one cut.

In 1994, the band contributed a version of "Massachusetts" to a Bee Gees tribute CD, released by pop band the Jigsaw Seen. This was the first of the now over thirty compilations that Insect Surfers have been featured on.

In 1995, guitarists Arnson and Sullivan were both invited to audition for the position of guitarist for Chris Isaak, whom they had opened a show for a year earlier. By this time they had also opened shows for Dick Dale, Jonathan Richman, Agent Orange, Los Straitjackets, and, again, The Ventures. Also in 1995, the original lineup of the band reunited for a one-time performance at Washington, DC's original 9:30 Club, which was about to relocate to its current location. This performance was included on the 930 Live CD compilation, released by Adelphi Records in 1997; the CD also featured performances by seminal DC punk/new wave acts such as Urban Verbs, Tiny Desk Unit, Tru Fax and The Insaniacs, and Black Market Baby.

The next year saw the release of Insect Surfers' Death Valley Coastline CD, featuring the same personnel as East West. Death Valley Coastline included a guest appearance (on the cut "Volcano Juice") by instrumental fuzz guitar pioneer Davie Allan, whom Arnson credits as a major musical influence. Also released in 1996 was Rhino Records 4-CD history of surf music, Cowabunga! The Surf Box, which cemented Insect Surfers’ role in the development of the genre with the inclusion of their classic track "Polaris". In January 2002, Insect Surfers shared a two-day bill with Peter Case, John Doe, George Sarah’s string trio, and other musicians at the Grand Opening Fiesta for Rhino Records’ new store near Westwood Village in Los Angeles.

In 2003, the Insect Surfers released their CD Mojave Reef, showcasing cover art by underground cartoonist/painter Mary Fleener. Mojave Reef found the band's sound expanding to feature field recording samples, extended feedback, and psychedelic segments. This release also helped garner the award of Best Instrumental Band by LA Weekly magazine.

In 2010, Insect Surfers performed at the SG101 Surf Music Festival, where they were filmed for segments included in the surf music documentary Reverb Junkies, released in 2012.

In 2011, Insect Surfers were the featured musical act at The Spaghetti Western Film Festival in North Hollywood.

By 2013, personnel changes included stints by Mike Gregan, Jim Sciurba, and Adrien Anthony on drums, Dan Valentie and Marty Tippens on guitar, and the addition of Jonpaul Balak on bass guitar. The lineup on 2013's Infra Green CD and LP featured David Arnson and Michael Abraham on guitars, Jonpaul Balak on bass, and drums by Jeff Utterback. This was followed by a headlining appearance at the Surfer Joe Summer Festival in Livorno, Italy, along with an accompanying European tour.

The Insect Surfers played the 2014 Instro Summit festival in Durham, North Carolina.

In May 2015, the band again played North Carolina's Instro Summit festival, as well as embarking on an east coast tour. September 2015, Insect Surfers were a headline act at the Zion Canyon Music Festival.

In September 2016 Insect Surfers were a featured act at Atlanta's Southern Surf Stompfest.

In 2017, the band released of the CD Datura Moon, featuring the same lineup as Infra Green, but with the new addition of Chris Roberts on drums. This led to another headlining appearance at the Surfer Joe Summer Festival in Livorno, Italy, along with an accompanying European tour.

In 2018 they released their Living Fossils CD, a collection of all the Insect Surfers tracks found on other compilations. They also contributed their new track "Armor Of Light" to the CD Stand Up, Stand Up for P.J. — A Tribute to Paul "Mr. Moto" Johnson, and they performed at an all-star benefit for surf guitarist Paul Johnson at The Gaslamp in Long Beach on December 9. Their track "God Rest Ye Merry Gentlemen" was included on the indie-rock CD compilation Something Shocking From The Stocking.

In 2019 the band celebrated their milestone 40th anniversary by touring Europe (Italy, Switzerland, Germany, and The Netherlands) and the USA, performing at six of the major surf music-centric festivals around the world—Surfer Joe Summer Festival, Tiki-Kon, an August 3 headliner appearance at the Los Angeles Surf Guitar 101 Convention, an appearance at San Diego's Tiki Oasis, and as part of an East Coast tour they appeared at Atlanta's Southern Surf Stompfest, at Ashby Park, NJ's Hi-Tide Summer Holiday, and they performed at a 40th reunion gig in Washington DC, which included performing with all of the original members of the band.

2022 saw the release of a new, expanded edition of the best of compilation Satellite Beach, this time titled Satellite Bay, featuring additional recordings made since the original in 2004, notably, songs from Infra Green and Datura Moon.
