= Steve Stanley =

American music historian (born 1970)

Steve Stanley (born 1970) is an American music historian, reissue producer, graphic artist, musician, and the founder of Now Sounds, a reissue record label established in 2007 and distributed by Cherry Red Records.

== Early life ==
Raised in Oklahoma in the 1970s, Stanley developed an appreciation for the music of the 1950s and 1960s through his mother’s record collection. According to Brian Greene’s 2012 Shindig! article on Stanley: “The seven-year-old (Stanley) was greatly affected by Elvis Presley’s death and, later in his youth, felt like a musical outsider, preferring the music of Elvis, Buddy Holly, and The Beatles to the then-popular rock and pop acts.” His family later moved to Los Angeles where he played in bands, including The Acitones and Single Bullet Theory. After working as a waiter, he entered the music business at age 24 as a salesman for Navarre Corporation, a music distributor based in Minnesota. By 1997, he was one of the three top salesmen in the company when Bob Keane of Del-Fi Records, the man who signed Sam Cooke and Ritchie Valens, hired Stanley to head up sales for his label.

== Reissue Producer ==
While at Del-Fi Records, Stanley co-produced releases for the label, including the various-artist compilations Gee Baby Gee: The Del-Fi Girl Groups, and Delphonic Sounds Today!: Del-Fi Does Del-Fi. After leaving Del-Fi, Stanley began producing, designing, and/or annotating reissues for the Rev-Ola imprint of London-based Cherry Red Records. Stanley’s projects focused on lesser-known, cult pop artists of the 1960s whose albums had long been out of print, including titles by The Merry Go Round, Eternity’s Children, Nino & April, Evie Sands, and others. Rev-Ola’s reissue of Nashville arranger Bergen White’s For Women Only album, which Stanley also produced, received five-star reviews in both Mojo and Uncut and made Uncut's Best Reissues of 2004 list.

By the late 2000s, Stanley launched his own Cherry Red Records imprint, Now Sounds. He produced, designed, and/or annotated reissues of albums by The Association, Janis Ian, Paul Revere & The Raiders, The Cowsills, The Mamas & The Papas, The Knack, Dion, Del Shannon, Donna Loren, Roger Nichols, Paul Williams, Tiny Tim, and others. The label also includes mastering engineer Alan Brownstein and writer/editor Sheryl Farber. In 2012, music journalist and Saint Etienne member Bob Stanley (no relation to Steve) wrote a feature article on the Now Sounds label and sunshine pop music for The Times of London. He described Now Sounds as “specializing in late Sixties Soft Rock - the orchestrated, harmony-rich sound propagated by The Mamas and The Papas, typified by Pet Sounds, and made a world-beating now sound by Sgt. Pepper.” Also in 2012, Now Sounds was voted one of the Top 5 "Best Record Labels" in Shindig!'s 2012 Writers' Poll.

== Graphic Designer ==
Also a graphic designer, Stanley has art directed and/or designed boxed set packages and contemporary releases for Rhino Records, ABKCO Records, Warner Records, and Sony/Legacy, including titles by Nilsson, Bee Gees, Bob Seger, The Monkees, Love, Jan & Dean, Devo, Allen Toussaint, and others. The boxed set package of The Beau Brummels’ Bradley’s Barn, which Stanley designed, made Rolling Stone’s Best Reissues list of 2011. Stanley also art directed the various-artist collection Where the Action Is! Los Angeles Nuggets 1965–1968. In 2010 this boxed set was nominated for a Grammy Award in the Best Historical Album category.

== The Now People ==
The Los Angeles-based pop quartet The Now People includes Stanley and mastering engineer Alan Brownstein, with Nelson Bragg and Probyn Gregory, members of Brian Wilson’s backing band. The group’s debut album, The Last Great 20th Century Love Affair, was issued in 2006 on Bird Songs Recordings, an imprint of Parasol Records. The album was recorded at Studio Thru Inner Space and Carousel 44, and includes participation by some of the members of the Wondermints. The Now People’s recording of “All The Things You Are,” written by Stanley, was featured in the motion picture Randy and the Mob, starring Ray McKinnon and Burt Reynolds. As a solo vocalist, Steve has also participated in tribute and benefit concerts in Los Angeles, including the Wild Honey Foundation’s 2015 presentation of The Beatles’ White Album.

== Other projects ==
As a journalist, Stanley has penned articles which have appeared in Mojo magazine, including a 2004 feature on Bobby Jameson after Stanley located the reclusive singer songwriter through a private investigator.

In the mid-2000s, Stanley launched a weekly Internet radio show called 'The Now Sounds' on luxuriamusic.com. He has featured a number of guests on his show including studio drummer Bernard Purdie and Orpheus, a psychedelic Bosstown Sound band that had hits in the 1960s.

As an actor, Stanley appeared as Wrecking Crew member Barney Kessel in The Beach Boys: An American Family, a 2000 television film directed by Jeff Bleckner. The film was nominated for three Emmy Awards. Stanley was also a musician on the 2013 documentary Dear Mom, Love Cher about Cher's mother, Georgia Holt.

He lives in Los Angeles with his wife, Sheryl Farber, a three-time Grammy nominee.
