= Monitor Records =

Monitor Records may refer to:

- Monitor Records (Baltimore), a Baltimore, Maryland-based independent record label that includes releases from Studded Left
- Monitor Records (Hong Kong), a music label in Hong Kong that includes releases from Bellini
- Monitor Records (New York), a small, independent record label which operated out of New York City
- Monitor (record label), Czech independent punk/rock label, established in 1989/90, taken over by EMI to become Monitor-EMI in 1999
