= The Bobby Fuller Four =

American rock & roll band (1962–1966)

- The Bobby Fuller Four in 1965; L-R Randy Fuller, Bobby Fuller, DeWayne Quirico and Jim Reese

Background information
- Also known as: The Fanatics , Bobby Fuller and the Fanatics, the Shindigs
- Origin: El Paso, Texas, United States
- Genre: Rock and roll
- Years active: 1962–1966
- Labels: Donna, Eastwood, Exeter, Liberty, Mustang, Todd, Yucca
- Past members: Principal; Bobby Fuller; Randy Fuller; Jim Reese; Dalton Powell; DeWayne Quirico; Other; Paul Braithwaite; Googie Dirmeyer; Mike Ciccarelli; Sonny Fletcher; Gaylord Grimes; Jerry Miller; Freddie Paz; Tex Reed; Larry Thompson; Jimmy Wagnon; Billy Webb

The Bobby Fuller Four (sometimes stylized as Bobby Fuller 4) was a popular mid-1960s American rock & roll band started by Bobby Fuller. First formed in 1962 in Fuller's hometown of El Paso, Texas, the group went on to produce some of its most memorable hits under the Mustang Records label in Hollywood, California. The band's most successful songs include "Let Her Dance", "I Fought the Law" and "Love's Made a Fool of You". The group broke up in 1966 after the still-mysterious death of Bobby Fuller.

== History ==
Fuller recorded his first single, "You're in Love", in 1961. Recorded in his parents' living room with the Embers, a local band he played in, it became a regional hit. Fuller started a new band in 1962, backed by his brother Randy on bass and Gaylord Grimes on drums. They had their single, "Gently My Love", professionally recorded at Norman Petty Recording Studios in Clovis, New Mexico. Although they achieved another regional hit, Fuller was not satisfied.

Disengaging from Yucca Records in Alamogordo, which had released his first two records, Fuller and his band began releasing their records through Fuller's own various independent labels, with the recordings done in Fuller's home recording studio. The group never had a definite name and recordings were credited to either "Bobby Fuller", or "Bobby Fuller and the Fanatics". Various additional members played in the band, the most significant being Jim Reese (formerly of the Embers) on guitar, and Dalton Powell (who had played piano for the Embers) on drums.

By 1963, the band pursued a record deal with a major label in Hollywood, California. While they were neglected by most labels, Bob Keane of Del-Fi Records showed particular interest in the group. While he saw potential, he didn't think the band had hit material yet. Fuller and his band returned to El Paso and continued to release regional hits, the most popular being "I Fought the Law", originally by the Crickets. By the end of 1964, Fuller saw branching out to a major label as their only option, thus Bobby Fuller, Randy Fuller, and Jim Reese prepared to move to California to revisit Del-Fi Records. Current drummer Dalton Powell could not make the move due to family commitments, and was replaced by another drummer, DeWayne Quirico, instructed by Fuller in person.

The band appeared as "themselves" in the 1966 film The Ghost in the Invisible Bikini - a comedy combining the ubiquitous beach, horror, and biker themes of the day. They back Nancy Sinatra on the song "Geronimo" and perform "Make The Music Pretty" and other incidental music.

== Del-Fi Records ==
With the group's new hit records, Keane signed them to Del-Fi this time around. The band's first Del-Fi release, "Those Memories of You" was under the sister label, Donna Records (credited to Bobby Fuller and the Fanatics). With the band's increasing local popularity, Keane created a sister label just for Fuller's band, Mustang Records. The first release on Mustang was "Thunder Reef" in 1965. This time, the band was credited as the Shindigs to capitalize on the new ABC show, Shindig! Seeking a more permanent name, Keane decided upon the Bobby Fuller Four (as he favored Fuller), which was first used on the band's next single, "Take My Word". The new name received mixed reactions with the rest of the group, claiming that it put too much emphasis on Fuller, as opposed to the rest of the band, but the name stuck.

While their next release, "Never to be Forgotten" brought a regional hit, the band's next single, "Let Her Dance" brought the band's first national hit, barely missing the Billboard Hot 100 at 133, though bringing in a Top 40 hit. At the suggestion of Randy Fuller, the El Paso hit, "I Fought the Law" was re-recorded. It quickly gained national popularity, and by 1966, it rose to its peak position at No. 9 on the national charts. Meanwhile, the band was starting to experience internal troubles after touring, and drummer DeWayne Quirico abruptly left the group. John Barbata was asked to take his place, while negotiations were underway to get Dalton Powell back in the band. While performing at L.A. venue "P.J." the band produced a memorable performance of "I fought the law" featuring the go-go dancer Lada St. Edmund into the NBC television show Hullaballoo, and also participated in another TV show, Shivaree.

With Powell reinstated, the group went on to release "Love's Made a Fool of You", another Crickets cover (written by Buddy Holly and Bob Montgomery and recorded by Holly as a demo, reportedly intended for the Everly Brothers, though never recorded by that duo). This went on to become another national hit for the band. The next single was taken from the sessions where Barbata sat in, "The Magic Touch," written by Ted Daryll. While being popular locally, it did not match the success of the previous singles. In addition to the already existing internal problems, the band began to fall apart in July after Reese had received a draft notice in the mail (and arranged to sell his Jaguar XKE to Fuller), Powell also planned to announce his plans to leave the band to support his family back home.

== Aftermath ==
Bobby Fuller died under mysterious circumstances on July 18, 1966. His body was found beaten inside his car parked just outside of his Hollywood home. Evidence suggests that he had ingested gasoline. Initially, these details were not released to the public. Although many of his friends suspected he might have been murdered by mobsters, Fuller's death was officially ruled a suicide by police.

In November 2008, the Los Angeles County Department of Coroner conducted a formal case review of the 1966 death of Robert Gaston Fuller at the request of Dr. Lakshmanan. The review was triggered by a letter from Neville Johnson, an attorney representing the decedent's heir, who requested that Fuller's body be exhumed and re-examined. The subsequent case review, authored by Chief of the Forensic Medicine Division Dr. Christopher Rogers, re-evaluated the original autopsy findings. Dr. Rogers noted that while the initial death was closed as asphyxia due to gasoline inhalation, the original description of numerous petechial hemorrhages "appears excessive" and could not be fully explained as mere positioning artifacts. The report concluded that the original cause of death was largely based on circumstantial surroundings rather than definitive forensic testing, stating, "I am not certain that asphyxia from causes other than gasoline has been ruled out". Dr. Rogers recommended obtaining the original police records, scene photographs, and suicide team notes for further verification.

At the death of Fuller, the group disbanded. Their final single, "It's Love, Come What May" was only released in limited quantities as a promotional recording. Months later, Keane arranged the formation of the Randy Fuller Four in an attempt to capitalize on the previous success of the Bobby Fuller Four, complete with Randy Fuller on bass and rhythm guitar, DeWayne Quirico returning on drums, and Mike Ciccarelli and Howard Steele (other former El Paso musicians) on lead guitar and bass, respectively. The group released a few singles (including overdubbing the Bobby Fuller Four's "It's Love, Come What May"), but disbanded less than a year later in 1967 without any chart success.

Most former members of the Bobby Fuller Four remained active in the music industry after the group disbanded. Jim Reese died in 1991 after suffering a fatal heart attack whilst playing a round of golf.

Bobby Fuller has been the subject of two books: I Fought The Law: The Life and Strange Death of Bobby Fuller by Miriam Linna & Randell Fuller (2015); and Rock & Roll Mustangs by Stephen J. McParland (2009 and with an updated edition released in 2021).

== Discography ==
=== Singles ===
Year	Single (A-side, B-side) Both sides from same album except where indicated	Label and number	US	Album
1961	"You're in Love"^{1} b/w "Guess We'll Fall in Love"	Yucca 140		Non-album tracks
1962	"Gently, My Love"^{1} b/w "My Heart Jumped"	Yucca 144		Non-album tracks
1962	"Nervous Breakdown"^{1} b/w "Not Fade Away"	Eastwood (No #)		Non-album tracks
1963	"Saturday Night"^{1} b/w "Stringer"	Todd 1090		Non-album tracks
1964	"King of the Beach"^{1} b/w "Wine, Wine, Wine"	Exeter 122		Non-album tracks
1964	"She's My Girl"^{1} b/w "I Fought the Law"	Exeter 124		Non-album tracks
1964	"Fool of Love"^{2} b/w "Shakedown"	Exeter 126		Non-album tracks
1964	"Those Memories of You"^{2} b/w "Our Favorite Martian"	Donna 1403		Non-album tracks
1964	"Wolfman"^{3} b/w "Thunder Reef"	Mustang 3003		Non-album tracks
1965	"Take My Word"^{A} b/w "She's My Girl"	Mustang 3004		KRLA King of the Wheels
1965	"Let Her Dance"^{A} b/w "Another Sad and Lonely Night"^{A} Also released on Liberty 55812 and Mustang 3012	Mustang 3006	133	KRLA King of the Wheels
1965	"Never to Be Forgotten"^{A} b/w "You Kiss Me" (from I Fought the Law)	Mustang 3011		KRLA King of the Wheels
1965	"I Fought the Law" b/w "Little Annie Lou"^{A} (from KRLA King of the Wheels)	Mustang 3014	9	I Fought the Law
1966	"Love's Made a Fool of You" b/w "Don't Ever Let Me Know"	Mustang 3016	26	Non-album tracks
1966	"The Magic Touch" b/w "My True Love"	Mustang 3018	117	Non-album tracks
1966	"It's Love, Come What May"^{4} b/w "Wolfman"	Mustang 3020		Non-album tracks

^{A}Tracks from the first Mustang album also featured on the follow-up album I Fought the Law
^{1} Singles released as by Bobby Fuller
^{2} Released as by Bobby Fuller and The Fanatics
^{3} Released as by The Shindigs
^{4} Released as by Randy Fuller, but actually recorded by The Bobby Fuller Four with Randy's vocals overdubbed on A-side

=== Original US albums ===
- KRLA King of the Wheels (Mustang M-900 [mono] / MS-900 [stereo], 1965)
- I Fought the Law (Mustang M-901 [mono] / MS-901 [stereo], 1966)
- Celebrity Night At PJ's (cancelled — originally to be released as Mustang M-902 [mono] / MS-902 [stereo]; finally issued in the Never To Be Forgotten: The Mustang Years box set, 1997)

=== Compilations and reissues ===
- The Bobby Fuller Memorial Album (LP, President 1003, 1968)
- The Best of the Bobby Fuller Four (LP, Rhino RNDF-201, 1981)
- KRLA King of the Wheels (LP, Line LP-5146, 1981)
- I Fought the Law (LP, Line LP-5133, 1981)
- The Bobby Fuller Memorial Album (LP, Strand 6.24885, 1982)
- Let Them Dance (The Rare Sides) (LP, OutLine OLLP-5272, 1983)
- Live on Stage (LP, OutLine OLLP-5302, 1983)
- I Fought the Law (LP, Eva 12032, 1983)
- Live Again (LP, Eva 12046, 1984)
- The Best of the Bobby Fuller Four (CD, Rhino 70174, 1990)
- The Bobby Fuller Four (CD, Ace CDCHD-956, 1990)
- Live at PJ's...Plus! (CD, Ace CDCHD-314, 1991)
- The Best of the Bobby Fuller Four (CD, Ace CDCHD-388, 1992)
- The Bobby Fuller Four (CD, Del-Fi DFCD-70174, 1994)
- Never to Be Forgotten: The Mustang Years (3-CD box set, Mustang/Del-Fi DFBX-3903, 1997)
- The Mustang Years (2LP, Munster MR-184, 2000)
- I Fought the Law and Others (7-inch EP, Munster 7141, 2000)
- I Fought the Law: The Best of The Bobby Fuller Four (CD, Del-Fi/Rhino 71904, 2001)
- I Fought the Law and Other Hits (CD, Flashback/Rhino 78170, 2004)
- Rhino Hi-Five: The Bobby Fuller Four (CD, Rhino 7????, 2006)
- Magic Touch: The Complete Mustang Singles Collection (CD, Now Sounds [UK] WCRNOW-57, 2018)
