= Groovy Times =

Promotional single by the Clash

from the EP The Cost of Living
- Released: 11 May 1979
- Recorded: 1979
- Genre: Punk rock
- Length: 3:26
- Label: Epic
- Songwriters: Joe Strummer; Mick Jones

"Groovy Times" is a song by the English rock band the Clash, featured on their The Cost of Living EP and also included with initial pressings of the US release of the band's debut album. It was originally recorded as "Groovy Times Are Here Again" during the recording sessions for Give 'Em Enough Rope; however, this demo has never been officially released, but can be found on many Clash bootlegs. It was never performed live. The vinyl version contains the song "Gates of the West".

The song's lyrics are filled with images of urban decay and civil unrest and focus on recurring Clash themes of alienation, monotony and oppression. According to their author, Joe Strummer, the lyrics were sparked by his disgust at the erection of fences in Britain's football terraces, built to keep fans apart in response to football hooliganism. Ten years later the Hillsborough Disaster would prove these fences fatal and his concerns irrefutably correct. The 'King of Early Evening ITV' mentioned in the song is confirmed as Bill Grundy, whose career was ruined after his infamous interview with the Sex Pistols and was indeed presenting early evening television on British terrestrial channel ITV. "I can remember his first appearance now look what's happened to him, so they put him in a dog suit like from 1964" is about singer-songwriter Elvis Costello.

The music, acoustic and guitar based, was predominantly written by Mick Jones and feature harmonica parts by him but credited to 'Bob Jones', a pseudonym that was apparently a reference to singer/songwriter Bob Dylan.

"Groovy Times" has subsequently been re-released on the Clash on Broadway and Singles Box box sets, its single-disc equivalent The Singles and the Super Black Market Clash and The Essential Clash compilations.

== Personnel ==
- Joe Strummer – lead vocals, acoustic guitar, electric guitar
- Mick Jones – backing vocals, harmonica, acoustic lead guitars
- Paul Simonon – bass guitar
- Topper Headon – drums

== Sources ==
- Topping, Keith (2003). The Complete Clash. Reynolds & Hern LTD.
- Gilbert, Pat (2005). Passion Is a Fashion: The Real Story of The Clash. Aurum Press Ltd.
