= Chan Romero =

American rock 'n' roll musician (1941–2024)

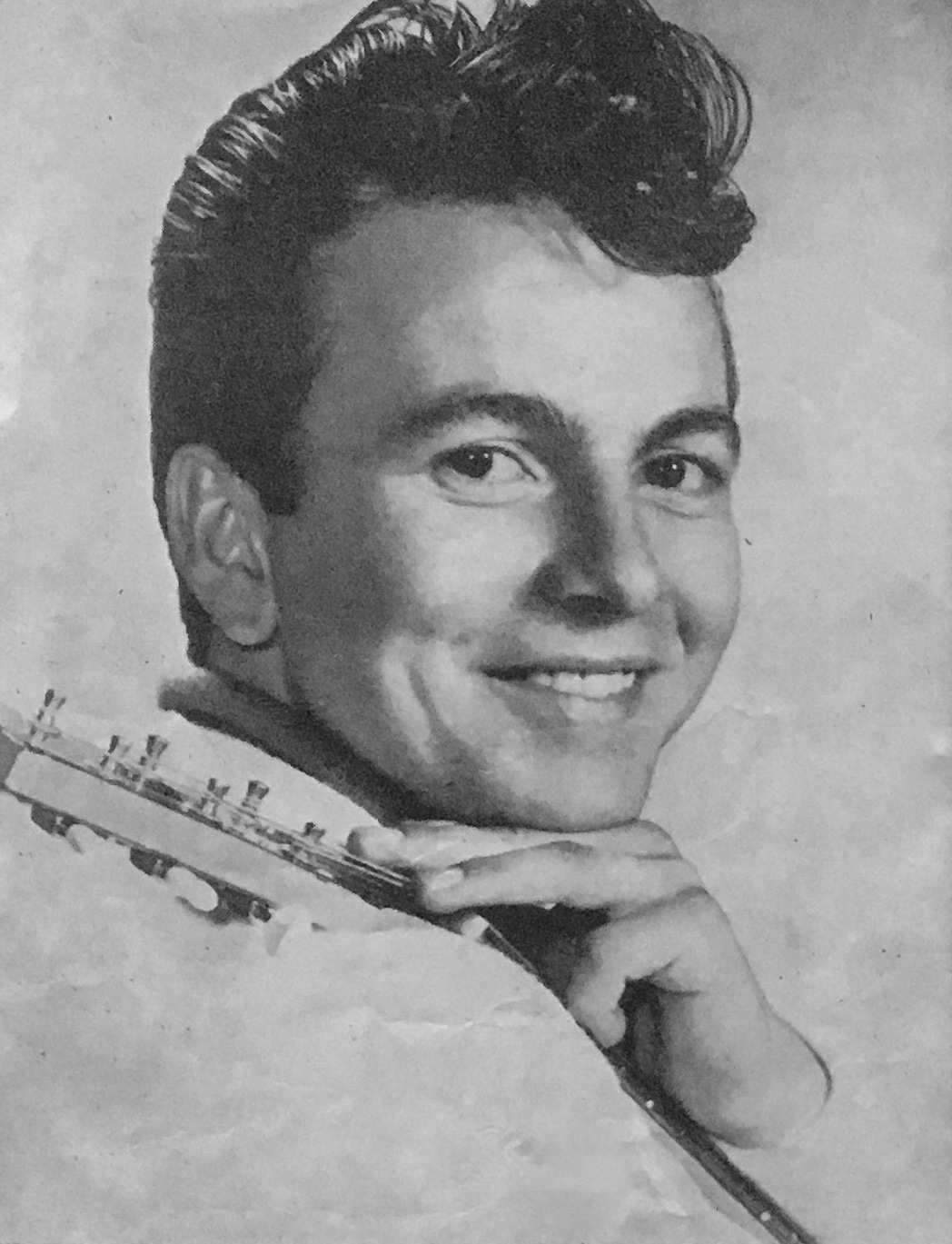

Background information
- Born: Robert Lee Romero; July 7, 1941; Billings, Montana, United States
- Died: April 21, 2024 (aged 82) California, U.S.
- Genres: Rock and roll
- Occupations: Musician, Singer, songwriter
- Instruments: Guitar, vocals
- Years active: 1959–1966
- Label: Del-Fi Records

Chan Romero (July 7, 1941 – April 21, 2024) was an American rock and roll musician and singer-songwriter best known for his 1959 song "Hippy Hippy Shake.

== Early life ==
Robert Lee Romero was born on July 7, 1941 in Billings, Montana. His father was of Spanish and Apache descent, and his mother was of Mexican, Cherokee, and Irish heritage. Both parents relocated to Montana from Colorado during the Great Depression seeking employment as migrant farm workers. Frequently barefoot as a child, Romero's grandfather affectionally described him in Spanish as "Chano," referring to "little boy with pig's feet”.

=== Musical aspiration ===
Elvis Presley's televised 1956 performance of "Hound Dog" on The Steve Allen Show inspired Romero to seek a career in music and begin songwriting. In 1958, Romero hitchhiked to East Los Angeles, where his uncle introduced Chan to Sonny Bono, at the time a talent scout for Specialty Records. Bono was particularly impressed with Romero's song, "My Little Ruby," and invited Chan back upon refining the song, but Romero soon returned to Montana to complete high school; nothing proceeded with Specialty.

=== Commercial breakthrough (1959-1960) ===
The following year, "Hippy Hippy Shake" was released on Del-Fi Records in July 1959, initially in North America. Subsequently released in Australia and the United Kingdom, the track caught the attention of Paul McCartney and The Beatles in their formative years, covering the song live while performing at the Cavern Club in Liverpool and at the Star-Club in Hamburg. Simultaneously, the song took off in Australia and Romero's popularity led to his billing and touring alongside Jerry Lee Lewis in 1960.

=== Musical chart performances ===
A 1964 cover version of the track by The Swinging Blue Jeans became a massive hit across Europe, reaching number two on the UK Singles Chart.

Romero became the first Latino to be inducted into the Rockabilly Hall of Fame.

== Personal life ==
Romero's musical style bore a strong resemblance to that of Ritchie Valens, who was the same age, of a similar heritage, and was likewise signed to Del-Fi Records. Valens' death on February 3, 1959 allowed Romero to meet Valens' grieving mother, Bobbie Valenzuela, and the two formed a close, lifelong bond such that Romero would stay at her home when visiting Los Angeles, and slept in Valens' former bedroom. He remained a close family friend and regularly performed at the annual Ritchie Valens Memorial Concert in Pacoima, California. Romero first visited Palm Springs, California in 1964, and eventually made it his permanent residence.

=== Later years ===
In his later years, he divided his time between Palm Springs and Billings. Romero's daughter stated in 2023 that her father was no longer actively receiving royalties for his music.

Later in life, Romero returned to Liverpool, England, where his music remained highly popular. During these appearances, he was backed by his close friend, musician and historian Mark Guerrero, alongside a band consisting of Liverpool-based musicians George Eccles (guitar), Frank Hopley (keyboards), Richie Ballard (bass guitar), and Arty Davies (drums).

Romero died on April 21, 2024, at the age of 82.

== Discography ==
=== Albums ===
Title	Note
Hip Shakin' Chan Romero	
Bought with a Price	

=== Singles ===
A-side	B-side	Year	Note
"Hippy Hippy Shake"	"If I Had a Way"	1959	
"I Don't Care Now"	"My Little Ruby"	1959	
"Funny Things"	"Funny Things"	1965	
"Humpy Bumpy"	"Humpy Bumpy"	1966	
