= DeWayne Quirico =

American drummer

- Also known as: DeWayne Bryant
- Born: Robert DeWayne Quirico; June 19, 1942 (age 84)
- Origin: El Paso, Texas, United States
- Genres: Rock; Pop
- Instrument: drums
- Years active: 1964–present
- Labels: Donna Records; Mustang Records; Liberty Records

Robert DeWayne Quirico (better known as simply DeWayne Quirico; born June 19, 1942) is a professional drummer, best known for his work with The Bobby Fuller Four. One of his most notable works is his unique percussion work on the band's biggest hit, "I Fought the Law".

At the unavailability of drummer Dalton Powell, Bobby Fuller personally chose Quirico to be the band's drummer upon their relocation to Hollywood from El Paso. Quirico played on every single release by the band up through "I Fought the Law", and was present during the band's rise to fame in Hollywood. His drumming is also featured on the band's only two studio albums, KRLA King of the Wheels and I Fought the Law. Quirico was also featured alongside the rest of the band in the 1966 film The Ghost in the Invisible Bikini. Quirico later left the band in 1965, citing a disagreement. Dalton Powell was then brought in as his replacement.

Quirico, going by multiple stage names, found success as a drummer in various local gigs throughout the 1960s and 1970s. Quirico convinced former bandmate Randy Fuller to keep playing music together after the sudden death of his brother. While going through various lineups, Fuller and Quirico remained the only constants in the group. Despite strong singles, the band never stayed together long enough to adequately promote them. After moving to Chicago, Quirico played and recorded with the band Conscripted in 2002. He has worked with Randy Fuller multiple times since the band's breakup. He currently resides in Tucson, Arizona.

== Discography ==
=== Bobby Fuller and the Fanatics ===
- "Those Memories of You" (1964)

=== The Shindigs ===
- "Thunder Reef" (1964)

=== The Bobby Fuller Four ===
Studio Albums

- KRLA King of the Wheels (1965)
- I Fought the Law (1966)
- Celebrity Night at PJ's (cancelled)

Singles

- "Take My Word" (1965)
- "Let Her Dance" (1965)
- "Never to Be Forgotten" (1965)
- "I Fought the Law" (1965)

=== Randy Fuller ===
- "1,000 Miles Into Space" (1969)

=== Floyd Red Crow Westerman ===
- Custer Died for Your Sins (1970)

=== Pollution ===
- Heir: Pollution (1969)

=== Twin Engine ===
- Twin Engine (unreleased)

=== Gary Richardson ===
- American Standard (1972)

=== Candle ===
- Candle (1972)

=== Jessie Hill ===
- Naturally (1972)

=== Randy Fuller Four ===
- Carryin' One (1992)
