= The Cost of Living (EP) =

EP by the Clash
- Released: 11 May 1979
- Recorded: 1979
- Studio: Wessex, London
- Genre: Punk rock
- Length: 13:01
- Label: CBS
- Producer: Bill Price; The Clash

The Clash EP chronology
Capital Radio (1977)	The Cost of Living (1979)	Black Market Clash (1980)

Singles from The Cost of Living
- 1. "I Fought the Law" Released: 26 July 1979 (US)

Professional ratings
Review scores
Source	Rating
AllMusic	4/5 stars

The Cost of Living is an EP by the English punk rock band the Clash. It was released on 11 May 1979 in a gatefold sleeve. The EP was produced by the band and Bill Price. It marked a transition in musical styles for the band, bridging the intensity of their earlier, punky albums with the broader, more American-influenced rock and roll yet to come on London Calling, most evident on the folk rocking "Groovy Times" and "Gates of the West".

The Clash's cover of Sonny Curtis' "I Fought the Law" remained in the band's live set list for much of the rest of their career. Joe Strummer also performed it with his later bands, including during his stint with the Pogues. The early single "Capital Radio" was re-recorded because the band learned that copies of the original Capital Radio EP were selling for high prices. "Capital Radio", later listed as "Capital Radio Two", is much longer, mainly because of a protracted outro.

"Gates of the West" clearly describes the ecstasy of the Clash in their first encounter with the United States: "Eastside Jimmy & Southside Sue both said they needed something new". "From Camden Town Station to 44th & 8th" describes their journey from their London neighbourhood to the middle of Manhattan.

It was recorded at Wessex Studios in Highbury in London, and features "extra high vocal" credited to Dennis Ferranti and harmonica credited to "Bob Jones" (a pseudonym of Mick Jones).

== Track listing ==
All songs written by Strummer/Jones except where noted.

=== Side one ===
1. "I Fought the Law" (Sonny Curtis) – 2:40
2. "Groovy Times" – 3:25

=== Side two ===
1. "Gates of the West" – 3:26
2. "Capital Radio" – 3:19
3. "The Cost of Living Advert" (only on original vinyl and Japanese version of the singles box set)

== Charts ==
Chart (1979)	Peak position
Ireland (IRMA)	24
UK Singles (OCC)	22
