= Tommy Gun (song) =

Single by the Clash

from the album Give 'Em Enough Rope
- B-side: "1–2 Crush on You"
- Released: 24 November 1978
- Recorded: 1978
- Genre: Punk rock; pop-punk ("1–2 Crush on You")
- Length: 3:13
- Label: CBS S CBS 6788
- Songwriters: Joe Strummer; Mick Jones
- Producer: Sandy Pearlman

The Clash singles chronology
| "(White Man) In Hammersmith Palais" (1978) | "Tommy Gun" (1978) | "English Civil War" (1979) |

Music video
- "Tommy Gun" on YouTube

"Tommy Gun" is a song by the English rock band the Clash, released as the first single from their second studio album, Give 'Em Enough Rope (1978).

== Background ==
Joe Strummer said that he got the idea for the song when he was thinking about terrorists, and how they probably enjoy reading about their killings as much as movie stars like seeing their films reviewed.

In the liner notes of the Singles Box, Carl Barat (former frontman of Dirty Pretty Things and the Libertines), says that "Tommy Gun" was important for music at the time because it let people know what was going on in the world – it talked about real issues. He says,

It's ["Tommy Gun"] a product of the volatile climate of the late seventies – all those references to terrorist organizations like Baader-Meinhof and The Red Brigades. It's like a punk rock adaptation of The Beatles' "Revolution".

== Track listing ==
All tracks written by Joe Strummer/Mick Jones.

7" vinyl

1. "Tommy Gun" – 3:18
2. "1-2 Crush On You" – 2:59

== Personnel ==
=== "Tommy Gun" ===
- Joe Strummer – lead vocals, rhythm guitar
- Mick Jones – lead guitar, backing vocals
- Paul Simonon – bass guitar
- Topper Headon – drums

=== "1–2 Crush on You" ===
- Mick Jones – lead guitar, lead and backing vocals
- Joe Strummer – rhythm guitar, backing and lead (outro) vocals, piano
- Paul Simonon – bass guitar, backing vocals
- Topper Headon – drums
- Gary Barnacle – saxophone

== Charts ==
| Chart | Peak position | Date |
|---|---|---|
| UK Singles Chart | 19 | December 1978 |

== Notes ==
- Gilbert, Pat (2005) [2004]. Passion Is a Fashion: The Real Story of The Clash (4th ed.). London: Aurum Press. ISBN 1-84513-113-4. OCLC 61177239.
- Gray, Marcus (2005) [1995]. The Clash: Return of the Last Gang in Town (5th revised ed.). London: Helter Skelter. ISBN 1-905139-10-1. OCLC 60668626.
- Green, Johnny; Garry Barker (2003) [1997]. A Riot of Our Own: Night and Day with The Clash (3rd ed.). London: Orion. ISBN 0-7528-5843-2. OCLC 52990890.
- Gruen, Bob; Chris Salewicz (2004) [2001]. The Clash (3rd ed.). London: Omnibus. ISBN 1-903399-34-3. OCLC 69241279.
- Needs, Kris (25 January 2005). Joe Strummer and the Legend of the Clash. London: Plexus. ISBN 0-85965-348-X. OCLC 53155325.
- Topping, Keith (2004) [2003]. The Complete Clash (2nd ed.). Richmond: Reynolds & Hearn. ISBN 1-903111-70-6. OCLC 63129186.
