= The Precious Prize of Gravity =

Studio album by Bellini
- Released: May 19, 2009
- Genre: Indie rock
- Label: Temporary Residence

Professional ratings
Review scores
Source	Rating
Rock Sound	6/10 stars

The Precious Prize of Gravity is the third studio album by international indie rock band Bellini.

== Track listing ==
1. "Wake Up Under a Truck" – 3:34
2. "Numbers" – 3:04
3. "Daughter Leaving" – 3:08
4. "Susie" – 3:50
5. "Tiger's Milk" – 3:03
6. "The Man Who Lost His Wings" – 4:26
7. "Save The Greyhounds"- 2:41
8. "The Thin Line"-4:18
9. "The Painter"-2:44
10. "A Deep Wound"-3:14
