= Gene Greif =

American graphic designer (1954–2004)

Gene Greif (September 11, 1954 – November 27, 2004) was an American graphic designer who specialized in creating album cover art.

Greif was born in Queens, New York. He attended LaGuardia High School of Music and Art and the Cooper Union where he first majored in architecture before graduating with a BFA in graphic design. In 1976, he became an art director for CBS Records where he designed album covers. He began his freelance career in 1983, working for Time, The New York Times, The Washington Post, Fortune, AOL, Time Warner, Bloomingdale's, and Knoll, among others.

Greif was credited for taking inspiration from graphic design movements such as Dada, Constructivism, Surrealism, and Cubism to design album covers. One of his most famous works titled Give 'Em Enough Rope by The Clash which became extremely popular among postmodern designers and influenced other punk album graphics.

Grief designed special shopping bags for Bloomingdale’s that was impacted by Cubism and Dada for the design. His recognizable style as an illustrator was a result from his expertise with an airbrush. In 1980, Greif was a staff designer at Rolling Stone magazine and an art director at Vogue and Working Woman magazines.

Greif died on November 27, 2004, from hepatitis C complications.
