= Green Cookie Records =

Green Cookie Records is an independent record label based in Thessaloniki, Greece. The label releases instrumental surf rock, garage rock, rock and roll and everything in between and has an international roster of artists.

== Surf bands ==
One band that had its first release on the label was French surf band, Les Agamemnonz. Another was Los Protones (The Protons) which are a Peruvian group whose music is psychedelia, surf and rock. Their album was 20 Monstruos! 2007-2015. Japanese surf group, The El Caminos had their Behind the Surf album released in 2016.

== Bands ==
- The Marshall Plan Kids
- The Star and Key of the Indian Ocean
- The El Caminos
- The Mutants
- The Surfacers
- The Ultra 5
- Insect Surfers
- I Fantomatici
- The Moe Greene Specials
- Bob Urh & the Bare Bones
- The Firewalkers
- The Immediates
- Speedball jr.
- El Ray
- Distortion Tamers
- The Dadds
- The Jumpin' Quails

== Discography ==
- GC001, The Marshall Plan Kids, "The Marshall Plan Kids", 2000, CD
- GC002, The Star and Key of the Indian Ocean, "Surf Strike!", 2002, CD
- GC003, The Mutants, "Deathrace 3000", 2002, CD
- GC004, The Star and Key of the Indian Ocean, "Rock N'Roll Fiasco", 2003, CD
- GC005, The Surfacers, "The Surfacers", 2004, CD
- GC006/SE001, The Ultra 5, "Denizens Of Dementia", 2004, best of CD
- GC007/SE002, Insect Surfers, "Satellite Beach", 2004, best of CD
- GC008, I Fantomatici, "Giustizia Sommaria", 2005, CD
- GC009, The Star and Key of the Indian Ocean, "Vintage Soup ...", 2005, CD
- GC010, The Moe Greene Specials, "The Moe Greene Specials", 2005, CD
- GC011, Bob Urh & the Bare Bones, "Hoodoo Garage", 2005, CD
- GC012, The Firewalkers, "Nervous Breakdown !!!", 2006, CD
- GC013, The Immediates, "Taylor Made Cut", 2006, CD
- GC014, Speedball jr., "For the Broad Minded", 2006, CD
- GC015, I Fantomatici, "Spaghetti Surf", 2007, CD
- GC016/SE003, El Ray, "Highwave to Hell, 23 golden hits 2001-2006", 2007, best of CD.
- GC017, Bob Urh & the Bare Bones, "Swamp O Delic", 2007, CD
- GC018, The Dadds, "Idées Choc & Propos Chic", 2009, CD
- GC019, The Jumpin' Quails, "What's Your Jump Like?", 2009, CD
- GC020, The Graves Brothers Deluxe, "San Malo", 2010, CD
- GC021, The Gonks, "Float Yer Boat", 2009, CD
- GC022LP, Wadadli Riders, "Made In Antigua", 2009, LP
- GC023, Painted Air, "Come On 69", 2010, CD
- GC023LP, Painted Air, "Come On 69", 2010, picture disc LP
- GC024, Bob Urh & The Bare Bones "Cha Cha Cha Review" CD
- GC025LP, Los Venturas "Kaleidoskop" LP
- GC026, Pedrito Diablo & Los Cadaveras "El Cuerno del Chivo" CD
- GC027, Distortion Tamers, 'Junglehead Stories', 2011, CD

== See also ==
- List of record labels
