= English Civil War (song) =

Single by the Clash

from the album Give 'Em Enough Rope
- B-side: "Pressure Drop"
- Released: 23 February 1979 (U.K.)
- Recorded: 1978
- Genre: Punk rock
- Length: 2:35
- Label: CBS 7082
- Songwriters: traditional, arranged by Joe Strummer and Mick Jones
- Producer: Sandy Pearlman

The Clash singles chronology
"Tommy Gun" (1978)	"English Civil War" (1979)	"I Fought the Law" (1979)

"English Civil War" (often subtitled "Johnny Comes Marching Home") is a song by the English rock band the Clash, featured on their second studio album, Give 'Em Enough Rope, and released as a single on 23 February 1979. It reached No. 25 on the UK singles chart and No. 29 on the Irish Singles Chart.

== Background ==
The song is derived from an American Civil War song, "When Johnny Comes Marching Home", written by Irish-born Massachusetts Unionist Patrick Sarsfield Gilmore. It was popular among both sides of the conflict.

Having learnt the song at school, Joe Strummer suggested that the band should update it. Those on the left wing saw the rise during the mid-1970s of far-right groups such as the National Front as alarming and dangerous omens for Britain's future. The song is about this state of politics in the country and warns against all things uniformed and sinister. Shortly after the song had its first live performance at a Rock Against Racism concert, Strummer said, echoing the song's lyrics, in an interview to the music newspaper Record Mirror:

War is just around the corner. Johnny hasn't got far to march. That's why he is coming by bus or underground.

The cover of the single is a still from John Halas and Joy Batchelor's 1954 animated adaptation of George Orwell's dystopian novella Animal Farm.

== Track listing ==
7" vinyl

1. "English Civil War (Johnny Comes Marching Home)" (Trad. Arr. Joe Strummer/Mick Jones) – 2:38
2. "Pressure Drop" (Toots Hibbert) – 3:25

== Personnel ==
=== "English Civil War" ===
- Joe Strummer – lead vocals, rhythm guitars
- Mick Jones – backing vocals, lead guitars
- Paul Simonon – bass guitar
- Topper Headon – drums

=== "Pressure Drop" ===
- Joe Strummer – lead vocal, piano, rhythm guitar
- Mick Jones – backing vocals, rhythm guitar, lead guitars
- Paul Simonon – backing vocal, bass guitar
- Topper Headon – drums

== Charts ==
Chart	Peak position	Date
UK Singles Chart	25	March 1979
Irish Singles Chart	29	March 1979
