= Surfer Joe =

Italian surf guitarist from Livorno, Italy

- Birth name: Lorenzo Valdambrini
- Origin: Livorno, Italy
- Genres: Surf music
- Years active: 1995-Present
- Website: https://www.surferjoe.net/

Surfer Joe (Lorenzo Valdambrini) is an Italian surf guitarist from Livorno. Long a regularly used nickname, Valdambrini adopted the stage name officially in 2011, when he returned to Italy from living on the island of Antigua and decided to go solo and break away from his previous band, Wadadli Riders. The name was also adopted by a retro American-style diner opened by Valdambrini and his brother Luca in Livorno called Surfer Joe Diner. This diner would eventually become the host location for the largest surf music festival in the world, the Surfer Joe Summer Festival, which was also based upon the stage name of Valdambrini. He is also active as a specialty producer for this unique niche genre of music, and has worked on projects for Reverberati, Paul Johnson, Rev. Hank and The Bradipos IV.

The band is one of the most active touring acts in modern surf music, playing upwards of one hundred plus concerts per year, and have toured extensively around the world including Japan, Mexico, Brazil, USA, Europe.

The band's style is traditional surf, which harkens back to the original era of the early sixties and focuses on strong melody, fairly clean guitar tones, and spring reverb, with a rhythm section that has more in common with jazz than rock.

== Legacy ==
Guitarists and bands who have covered Surfer Joe songs include Saguaro Pricks, Waves Of Steele, Sys Malakian, Oporto, Watang, Aloha In Hell, Surfantasmas, and The Mentawais, among many others. His music has appeared in film and television, including promotions for Bear Surfboards. And he has been interviewed for prominent books and documentary films covering surf music, such as Tim Cooley's Surfing About Music, Steve Seagren's Reverb Junkies, and John Blair and Tom Duncan's Sound Of The Surf. His music has also been selected to be included in prominent compilation releases that document the contemporary international surf scene, including Brave New Surf (Double Crown, 2011), Surf You Next Tuesday (Otitis Media, 2021), Surf You Next Tuesday 2! The Revenge (Otitis Media, 2022) and Wave Walk'n: A Tribute To The Surf Raiders (Green Cookie, 2022).

== Discography ==
=== With Wadadli Riders ===
- Surf Music Kings Of The Caribbean EP
- Rev Hank Meets Wadadli Riders EP
- Made In Antigua LP (2009 Green Cookie)

=== Surfer Joe ===
- Señor Surf (2013, LP-CD, Green Cookie)
- Fenderoni Diavolo (2014, 7" EP, Surfer Joe Music)
- El Sonido Cojonudo De Surfer Joe / Live In Brighton (2015, CD, Surfer Joe Music)
- Señor Surf 2nd Edition (2015, CD, Surfer Joe Music)
- The Kilaueas and Surfer Joe Play The Astronauts & More (2016, LP, Surfer Joe Music)
- The South Swell / Go-Go Martucci (2016, 7" Single, Surfer Joe Music)
- Yé-Yé: Surfer Joe Plays France Gall (2016, CD Single, Surfer Joe Music)
- Swell Of Dwell (2018, LP Dionysus Records - CD Surfer Joe Music)
- Bits And Pieces (2018, CD, Surfer Joe Music)
- Hiroshi No Subarashi Ramen / Black Sand Beach (2019, 7" Single. Hi-Tide Recordings)
- Surfer Joe Plays The Astronauts (2020, CD, Surfer Joe Music)
- World Traveler (2021, LP Hi-Tide Recordings - CD Surfer Joe Music)
- Billie Jean / Beat It (2023, CD Single, Surfer Joe Music)
- Señor Surf (2023, LP, Hi-Tide Recordings, repress)
- Still Workin' - The Best Of Surfer Joe Vol. 1 (2025, LP Hi-Tide Recordings - CD Surfer Joe Music)
