= Bobby Fuller =

American rock musician (1942–1966)

- Fuller performing with the Bobby Fuller Four in 1966

Background information
- Born: Robert Gaston Fuller; October 22, 1942; Baytown, Texas, U.S.
- Origin: El Paso, Texas, U.S.
- Died: July 18, 1966 (aged 23) Los Angeles, California, U.S.
- Genres: Rock, pop
- Occupations: Singer-songwriter, musician
- Instruments: Vocals, guitar, piano, drums
- Years active: 1958–1966
- Labels: Liberty, Yucca, Exeter, Eastwood, Mustang, Todd
- Formerly of: The Bobby Fuller Four

Robert Gaston Fuller (October 22, 1942 – July 18, 1966) was an American rock singer, songwriter, and guitarist best known for "Let Her Dance" and his cover of the Crickets' "I Fought the Law," recorded with his group the Bobby Fuller Four.

== Early life ==
Fuller was born in Baytown, Texas, to Lawson Sheppard Fuller and Eva Lorraine Barrett Fuller, the middle of three boys, having a maternal older half-brother, Jack, and a younger brother, Randy. Fuller moved as a small child to Salt Lake City, Utah, where he remained until 1956, when he and his family moved to El Paso, Texas. His father got a job at El Paso Natural Gas at that time. It was the same year that Elvis Presley became popular, and Bobby Fuller became mesmerized by the new rock and roll star. Fuller soon adopted the style of fellow Texan Buddy Holly, fronting a four-man combo and often using original material.

== Personal life ==
Fuller was engaged to his Texas sweetheart, Pamela, whom he met in 1962. Although the engagement ended in early 1965, Fuller traveled to Pecos, Texas, to visit her in June 1966, just weeks prior to his death. In 1964, during his engagement, Fuller concurrently fathered two children with separate El Paso acquaintances. These relationships resulted in a biological son named John, born in New Mexico to an acquaintance named Mary, who later reunited with the Fuller family, as well as a biological daughter named Allison born to an acquaintance named Suzie.

== Career ==
During the early 1960s, he played in clubs and bars in El Paso, and recorded on independent record labels in Texas with a changing line-up. The only constant band members were Fuller and his younger brother, Randy, on bass. These independent releases (except two songs recorded at the Norman Petty Studios in Clovis), and an excursion to Yucca Records, also in New Mexico, were recorded in the Fullers' own home studio, with Fuller acting as the producer. He even built a primitive echo chamber in the back yard. The quality of the recordings, using a couple of microphones and a mixing board purchased from a local radio station, was so impressive that he offered the use of his "studio" to local acts for free so he could hone his production skills.

Fuller moved to Los Angeles in 1964 with his band the Bobby Fuller Four and was signed to Mustang Records by producer Bob Keane, who was noted for discovering Ritchie Valens and producing many surf music groups. By this time, the group consisted of Fuller and his brother Randy on vocals/guitar and bass respectively, Jim Reese on guitar and DeWayne Quirico on drums. This lineup recorded "I Fought The Law". (There are actually two versions of "I Fought The Law" by Fuller, the original hit that was released as a 45-rpm single and the re-recording that was issued on an album. The arrangements are identical, but the vocals by Fuller are slightly different.)

At a time when the British Invasion and folk rock were the dominant genres in rock, Fuller stuck to Buddy Holly's style of classic rock and roll with Tex Mex flourishes. His recordings, both covers and originals, also reveal the influences of Eddie Cochran, the Beatles, Elvis Presley, Little Richard, and the Everly Brothers, as well as surf guitar. Less well known was Fuller's ability to emulate the reverb-laden surf guitar of Dick Dale and the Ventures. His first Top 40 hit was the self-penned "Let Her Dance". His second hit, "I Fought the Law", peaked at No. 9 on the Billboard Hot 100 on March 12–19, 1966. The song was originally written and recorded by Sonny Curtis, who became a member of Buddy Holly's former group the Crickets after Holly's death. The group's third Top 40 single was a cover of Holly's "Love's Made a Fool of You".

== Death ==
Within months of "I Fought the Law" becoming a top 10 hit, Fuller was found dead in a car parked outside his Hollywood apartment. The Los Angeles deputy medical examiner, Jerry Nelson, performed the autopsy. According to Dean Kuipers, "The report states that Bobby's face, chest, and side were covered in 'petechial hemorrhages', probably caused by gasoline vapors and the summer heat. He found no bruises, no broken bones, no cuts. No evidence of beating." Kuipers further explains that boxes for "accident" and "suicide" were checked, but next to the boxes were question marks. Despite the official cause of death, some commentators believe Fuller was murdered.

In November 2008, the Los Angeles County Department of Medical Examiner conducted a formal case review of the 1966 death of Bobby Fuller at the request of the department head, Dr. Lakshmanan Sathyavagiswaran. The review was triggered by a letter from Neville Johnson, an attorney representing Fuller's heir, who requested that Fuller's body be exhumed and re-examined. The subsequent case review, authored by Chief of the Forensic Medicine Division Dr. Christopher Rogers, re-evaluated the original autopsy findings. Dr. Rogers noted that while the initial death was closed as asphyxia due to gasoline inhalation, the original description of numerous petechial hemorrhages "appears excessive" and could not be fully explained as mere positioning artifacts. The report concluded that the original cause of death was largely based on circumstantial surroundings rather than definitive forensic testing, stating, "I am not certain that asphyxia from causes other than gasoline has been ruled out". Dr. Rogers recommended obtaining the original police records, scene photographs, and suicide team notes for further verification.

Fuller was buried at Forest Lawn Memorial Park-Hollywood Hills in Los Angeles. His death was profiled in a segment of Unsolved Mysteries.

His death was also explored in the May 11, 2015, episode of the NPR program All Things Considered. The program references the book I Fought the Law: The Life and Strange Death of Bobby Fuller by Miriam Linna, with contributions by Randy Fuller. Sometime after the Unsolved Mysteries segment in question initially aired, the cause of Fuller's death was officially changed from "suicide" to "accident".

== In popular culture ==
Fuller is explicitly referenced as an influential 1960s music icon in the lyrics of John Mellencamp's 1985 hit single "R.O.C.K. in the U.S.A.". New York City Celtic rock band Black 47 released a song titled "Who Killed Bobby Fuller?" on their second album, Home of the Brave, in 1994, and Atlanta indie rock band The Rock*A*Teens released an identically titled song on their 1996 self-titled debut album. Lou Reed referenced both Bobby Fuller by name and "I Fought the Law" on the track "Dirt" from his 1978 album Street Hassle, as did indie rock band Metric on their 2006 single "Monster Hospital". In 2013, producer and artist Terry Manning released a tribute album to his friend and mentor Bobby Fuller entitled West Texas Skyline. In 2016 the Austin band Holy Wave (whose members are originally from El Paso) released the song "California Took My Bobby Away" about Bobby Fuller, featured on their album Freaks of Nurture. In 2017, Chuck Prophet released an album titled Bobby Fuller Died for Your Sins.

== Discography ==
=== Studio albums ===
- KRLA King of the Wheels (1965)
- I Fought the Law (1966)

=== Live albums ===
- Celebrity Night at PJ's (cancelled — originally to be released as Mustang M-902 [mono] / MS-902 [stereo]; finally issued in the Never to Be Forgotten: The Mustang Years box set) ^{5}

=== Original US singles ===
- "You're in Love"/"Guess We'll Fall in Love" (Yucca 45-140, 1961) ^{1}
- "You're in Love"/"Guess We'll Fall in Love" (Yucca 45-140 [re-recordings], 1962) ^{1}
- "Gently My Love"/"My Heart Jumped" (Yucca 45-144, 1962) ^{2}
- "Nervous Breakdown"/"Not Fade Away" (Eastwood NO8W-0344/NO8W-0345, 1962) ^{2}
- "Saturday Night"/"Stringer" (Todd 45-1090, 1963) ^{2}
- "Wine, Wine, Wine"/"King of the Beach" (Exeter EXT-122, 1964) ^{2}
- "She's My Girl"/"I Fought The Law" (Exeter EXT-124, 1964) ^{2}
- "Fool of Love"/"Shakedown" (Exeter EXT-126, 1964) ^{3}
- "Those Memories of You"/"Our Favorite Martian" (Donna 1403, 1964) ^{3}
- "Wolfman"/"Thunder Reef" (Mustang 3003, recorded 1964/released January 1965) ^{4}
- "Take My Word"/"She's My Girl" (Mustang 3004, 1965) ^{5}
- "Let Her Dance"/"Another Sad and Lonely Night" (Mustang 3006, 1965) ^{5}
- "Let Her Dance"/"Another Sad and Lonely Night" (Liberty 55812 [reissue], 1965) ^{5}
- "Let Her Dance"/"Another Sad and Lonely Night" (Mustang 3012 [re-release], 1965) ^{5}
- "Never to Be Forgotten"/"You Kiss Me" (Mustang 3011, 1965) ^{5}
- "I Fought the Law"/"Little Annie Lou" (Mustang 3014, 1965) ^{5}
- "Love's Made a Fool of You"/"Don't Ever Let Me Know" (Mustang 3016, 1966) ^{5}
- "The Magic Touch"/"My True Love" (Mustang 3018, 1966) ^{5}
- "The Magic Touch"/"I'm a Lucky Guy" (Mustang 3018 [alternate issue], 1966) ^{5}
- "It's Love, Come What May"/"It's Love, Come What May" (Mustang 3020 [DJ promo], 1966) ^{5}
- "It's Love, Come What May" (with Randy Fuller's over-dubbed vocal)/"Wolfman" (Mustang 3020, 1966) ^{5}

=== Compilations and reissues ===
- The Bobby Fuller Memorial Album (LP, President 1003, 1968) ^{5}
- The Best of the Bobby Fuller Four (LP, Rhino RNDF-201, 1981) ^{5}
- KRLA King of the Wheels (LP, Line LP-5146, 1981) ^{5}
- I Fought the Law (LP, Line LP-5133, 1981) ^{5}
- The Bobby Fuller Memorial Album (LP, Strand 6.24885, 1982) ^{5}
- Let Them Dance (The Rare Sides) (LP, OutLine OLLP-5272, 1983) ^{5}
- Live on Stage (LP, OutLine OLLP-5302, 1983) ^{5}
- I Fought the Law (LP, Eva 12032, 1983) ^{5}
- Live Again (LP, Eva 12046, 1984) ^{5}
- The Bobby Fuller Tapes, Volume One (LP, Rhino RNLP-057, 1983) ^{2}
- The Bobby Fuller Tapes, Volume Two (LP, Voxx 200.028, 1984) ^{2}
- Memories of Buddy Holly (LP, Rockhouse 8407, 1984) ^{2}
- The Bobby Fuller Instrumental Album (LP, Rockhouse 8504, 1985) ^{2}
- The Best of the Bobby Fuller Four (CD, Rhino 70174, 1990) ^{5}
- The Bobby Fuller Four (CD, Ace CDCHD-956, 1990) ^{5}
- Live at PJ's...Plus! (CD, Ace CDCHD-314, 1991) ^{5}
- The Best of the Bobby Fuller Four (CD, Ace CDCHD-388, 1992) ^{5}
- The Bobby Fuller Four (CD, Del-Fi DFCD-70174, 1994) ^{5}
- Shakedown! The Texas Tapes Revisited (2-CD box set, Del-Fi DFBX-2902, 1996) ^{2}
- Never to Be Forgotten: The Mustang Years (3-CD box set, Mustang/Del-Fi DFBX-3903, 1997) ^{5}
- El Paso Rock: Early Recordings, Volume 1 (CD, Norton 252, 1996) ^{2}
- El Paso Rock, Volume 2: More Early Recordings (CD, Norton 260, 1997) ^{2}
- The Mustang Years (2LP, Munster MR-184, 2000) ^{5}
- I Fought the Law and Others (7-inch EP, Munster 7141, 2000) ^{5}
- I Fought the Law: The Best of the Bobby Fuller Four (CD, Del-Fi/Rhino 71904, 2001) ^{5}
- I Fought the Law and Other Hits (CD, Flashback/Rhino 78170, 2004) ^{5}
- Rhino Hi-Five: The Bobby Fuller Four (CD, Rhino 7????, 2006) ^{5}
- Rock And Roll King of the Southwest: The Best of the Texas Years 1962-64 (LP, Norton 325, 2007) ^{2}
- Bobby Fuller Live!!! (LP, Norton 326, 2007) ^{2}
- El Paso Rock: Early Recordings, Volume 3 (CD, Norton 318, 2010) ^{2}
- Magic Touch: The Complete Mustang Singles Collection (CD, Now Sounds [UK] WCRNOW-57, 2018) ^{5}

^{1} Released as by 'Bobby Fuller / Guitarist Jim Reese and the Embers, Vocal'. Note: issued twice with the same catalog number, but with completely different versions of both tracks.
^{2} Released as by Bobby Fuller
^{3} Released as by Bobby Fuller and the Fanatics
^{4} Released as by the Shindigs
^{5} Released as by the Bobby Fuller Four
