= Give 'Em Enough Rope =

Studio album by the Clash
- Released: 10 November 1978
- Recorded: March–April 1978; August–September 1978
- Studios: Basing Street (London); The Automatt (San Francisco)
- Genre: Punk rock
- Length: 36:57
- Labels: CBS; Epic
- Producer: Sandy Pearlman

The Clash chronology
The Clash (1977)	Give 'Em Enough Rope (1978)	London Calling (1979)

Singles from Give 'Em Enough Rope
- 1. "Tommy Gun" Released: 24 November 1978; 2. "English Civil War" Released: 23 February 1979

Give 'Em Enough Rope is the second studio album by the English punk rock band the Clash, released on 10 November 1978 through CBS Records. It was their first album released in the United States, preceding the US version of the self-titled studio album. The album was well received by critics and fans, peaking at number two in the United Kingdom Albums Chart, and number 128 in the Billboard 200. The album is tied with Combat Rock (1982) for being the highest-charting album for the Clash in their native United Kingdom.

The album marked the first album appearance of drummer Topper Headon, who joined the band shortly after the recording of their first studio album. Most of the tracks, as with the prior album, were written by guitarists Joe Strummer and Mick Jones, with the exception of "English Civil War" (a reworking of the traditional American folk song "When Johnny Comes Marching Home") and "Guns on the Roof", which is credited to all four band members, being Headon, Jones, Strummer, and bassist Paul Simonon.

== Background ==
The album's cover art was designed by Gene Greif, the front of which was based on a postcard titled "End of the Trail", photographed by Adrian Atwater and featuring Wallace Irving Robertson. The cover of the first US pressings showed the band's name written in block capital letters. Subsequent US pressings used a faux-oriental style font, which was then replaced with the more ornate faux-oriental style font used on the UK release. The original American issue of the album also retitled "All the Young Punks" as "That's No Way to Spend Your Youth". This was revised on later editions. "Tommy Gun" and "English Civil War" were released as the album's singles, either side of Christmas 1978. They entered the UK charts at numbers 19 and 25, respectively.

Though the opening track of side two, "Guns on the Roof", is ostensibly about global terrorism, war and corruption, it was partly inspired by an incident that resulted in the Metropolitan Police's armed counterterrorist squad raiding the Clash's Camden Market base. Paul Simonon and Topper Headon were arrested and charged with criminal damage (and later fined £750) for shooting racing pigeons with an air-gun from the roof of their rehearsal building.

The band continued to include contemporary subjects in their lyrics on the album; "Tommy Gun" deals with Middle Eastern terrorism, specifically the hi-jacking of aircraft, while "Julie's Been Working for the Drug Squad" is a commentary on the infamous "Operation Julie" drug bust that saw the largest LSD production ring in the world, based in Wales, dismantled by an undercover police operation. The song also makes a reference to the Beatles' song "Lucy in the Sky with Diamonds" in the opening line, "It's Lucy in the sky and all kinds of apple pie". "Drug-Stabbing Time" is strongly anti-drug and describes the paranoia of being caught despite the band's (specifically Mick Jones's) drug usage.

"Safe European Home" describes Strummer's and Jones uneasy writing trip to Jamaica. Jones later commented on the trip by saying, "we went down to the docks and I think we only survived because they mistook us for sailors." The song also contains references of Jamaican culture and buildings like the Sheraton hotel in Kingston.

During recording of the album, Joe Strummer's trademark Fender Telecaster guitar needed to be taken in for repairs, so he played a hired semi-hollow Gibson ES-345 for most of the sessions. Sandy Pearlman, who produced the original album, was not a big fan of Joe Strummer's voice, to the point that he ensured the drums were mixed louder than Strummer's vocals on the entire album.

Other songs recorded during the sessions included the single "(White Man) In Hammersmith Palais", as well as B-sides "Pressure Drop", "1-2 Crush on You" and "The Prisoner". Three more songs were recorded: "One Emotion", "Groovy Times" and "Rusted Chrome" (later reworked and released as "Gates of the West".)

== Critical reception ==
Retrospective professional ratings
Review scores
Source	Rating
AllMusic	4.5/5 stars
The Baltimore Sun	2.5/4 stars
Blender	3/5 stars
Christgau's Record Guide	A
Classic Rock	3.5/5 stars
The Encyclopedia of Popular Music	3/5 stars
Q	5/5 stars
The Rolling Stone Album Guide	4/5 stars
Select	4/5
Spin Alternative Record Guide	7/10

In a contemporary review for Rolling Stone, Greil Marcus hailed Give 'Em Enough Rope as a poised, unpretentious record of "straight English punk with a grip on the future" and "accessible hard rock" showcasing the Clash's unyielding, humorous "vision of public life": "The band's vision of a world strangling on its own contradictions hasn't changed, but their idea of their place in that world has." The Los Angeles Times praised Jones as "an excellent lead guitarist, both melodic and savage in his playing", dismissed "Last Gang in Town" as "a plodding bore", and lamented the "absence of ... roots reggae stylings".

Robert Christgau wrote in The Village Voice that the album's pessimistic mood and a couple of bad songs or moments made it less listenable than the band's debut studio album, but concluded that most of the songs were "effective melodically as anything on The Clash, and even the band's ruminations on the star as culture hero become more resonant as you hear them over and over again. This isn't among the greatest rock albums ever, but it is among the finest of the year." He named it the fourth best album of 1978 in his list for the Pazz & Jop, an annual poll of American critics in which Give 'Em Enough Rope also finished fourth. Sounds magazine named it the year's best record.

In 1993, Give 'Em Enough Rope was named the 87th greatest album of all time in NME magazine. Q included the record in their "100 Best Punk Albums" list, and wrote in retrospect that it was "no more punk than Blondie" and "shined of quality", and "their drumming problems were over with the arrival of jazz-trained [Topper] Headon."

== Track listing ==
All tracks are written by Joe Strummer and Mick Jones, except where noted. All lead vocals by Strummer, except "Stay Free" by Jones.

Side one
No.	Title	Writer(s)	Length
1.	"Safe European Home"		3:50
2.	"English Civil War"	Traditional; arranged by Jones and Strummer	2:35
3.	"Tommy Gun"		3:17
4.	"Julie's Been Working for the Drug Squad" (known as "Julie's in the Drug Squad" on original American release)		3:03
5.	"Last Gang in Town"		5:14

Side two
No.	Title	Writer(s)	Length
1.	"Guns on the Roof"	Topper Headon; Jones; Paul Simonon; Strummer	3:15
2.	"Drug-Stabbing Time"		3:43
3.	"Stay Free"		3:40
4.	"Cheapskates"		3:25
5.	"All the Young Punks (New Boots and Contracts)" (known as "That's No Way to Spend Your Youth" on original American release)		4:55
Total length:			36:57

== Personnel ==
The Clash

- Joe Strummer – lead and backing vocals, rhythm guitar
- Mick Jones – lead guitar, backing vocals, lead vocals on "Stay Free"
- Paul Simonon – bass guitar, backing vocals
- Topper Headon – drums

with:

- Al Fields, "The Village Legend" or Allen Lanier – piano on "Julie's Been Working for the Drug Squad" (uncredited)
- Stan Bronstein (of Elephant's Memory) – saxophone on "Drug Stabbing Time" (uncredited)
- Bob Andrews – keyboards on "Stay Free" (uncredited)

Production

- Sandy Pearlman – producer
- Corky Stasiak – engineer
- Paul Stubblebine – mastering engineer
- Dennis Ferrante – sound engineer
- Gregg Caruso – sound engineer
- Kevin Dallimore – sound engineer
- Chris Mingo – sound engineer
- Gene Greif – cover designer
- Hugh Brown – concept designer, cover photograph

== Charts ==
Chart performance for Give 'Em Enough Rope
Chart (1978–1979)	Peak position
Australian Albums (Kent Music Report)	79
New Zealand Albums (RMNZ)	15
Swedish Albums (Sverigetopplistan)	36
UK Albums (Official Charts)	2
US Billboard 200	128

2017 chart performance for Give 'Em Enough Rope
Chart (2017)	Peak position
Scottish Albums (Official Charts)	58

== Certifications ==
Certifications for Give 'Em Enough Rope
Region	Certification	Certified units/sales
United Kingdom (BPI)	Gold	100,000^{^}
^{^} Shipments figures based on certification alone.
