= Randy Fuller (musician) =

American rock singer, songwriter, and bass player (1944–2024)

- Born: Randall Fuller; January 29, 1944; Hobbs, New Mexico, U.S.
- Origin: El Paso, Texas, U.S.
- Died: May 16, 2024 (aged 80)
- Genres: Rock, pop
- Occupations: Singer-songwriter, musician
- Instruments: Vocals, guitar, bass, trombone
- Years active: 1962–2024
- Labels: Liberty Records, Del-Fi
- Formerly of: The Bobby Fuller Four

Randall Fuller (January 29, 1944 – May 16, 2024) was an American rock singer, songwriter, and bass player best known for his work in the popular 1960s rock group the Bobby Fuller Four with his older brother, Bobby Fuller.

== Life and career ==
Randy Fuller was the child of Lawson and Loraine Fuller and the younger brother of Bobby Fuller. Lawson Fuller worked in the oil industry, and the family moved around the Western USA often, eventually settling in El Paso, Texas.

The boys were always interested in music, though Bobby was the real prodigy in the family. Randy played trombone in the school band and eventually learned electric bass to accompany his older brother in his rock and roll endeavors.

By the early 1960s, the Fuller brothers (with various drummers and guitarists) were enjoying considerable success in El Paso and surrounding areas. Bobby invested in professional recording equipment, and they set up a makeshift studio at their parents' house. Bobby and Randy Fuller's group settled on the name Bobby Fuller and the Fanatics.

By 1963, Randy and the band went to Hollywood to play a set of gigs and look for a major record deal. While they found no takers, Bob Keane of Del-Fi Records showed interest. Meanwhile, the band returned to El Paso and put out more singles, the most popular being "I Fought the Law". Randy, inspired by the film Rebel Without a Cause, convinced Bobby to record the song from In Style with the Crickets. Later that year, Randy pushed Bobby into returning to Hollywood, where they were then signed to Del-Fi by Keane.

After initially struggling to put out a hit, the band, now dubbed The Bobby Fuller Four, succeeded with "Let Her Dance". The song was noted for its bottle-tapping rhythm and catchy bass line, both the result of Randy's input. The "Let Her Dance" success was later eclipsed by the group's re-recording of "I Fought the Law". With the professional mixing by Keane and Randy's driving bass, the song became a national hit at No. 9 on the national charts. While the band's chemistry began to erode following their breakout success, Bobby's sudden death on July 18, 1966, caused the Bobby Fuller Four to disband immediately.

While initially stricken, Randy was convinced by his former bandmate DeWayne Quirico to continue his musical career. Fuller released a string of singles such as The Randy Fuller Four, but he could never duplicate the success of his previous band. Since then, Randy has had many musical endeavors, many of which involved reuniting with former members of the Bobby Fuller Four. In 2015, Fuller collaborated with Miriam Linna to put out I Fought the Law: The Life and Strange Death of Bobby Fuller - the first authorized biography of Bobby Fuller and the Bobby Fuller Four.

Randy Fuller died on May 16, 2024, at 80.
