= Shivaree (TV series) =

- Presented by: Gene Weed
- Country of origin: United States
- No. of seasons: 2
- No. of episodes: 70

Original release
- Network: Syndication
- Release: April 1965 – May 1966

Shivaree is a Los Angeles-based music variety show that ran in syndication from 1965 to 1966. It was created and hosted by KFWB-AM personality Gene Weed, who in later years became a producer for Dick Clark Productions.

In its brief run, the show featured numerous acts, including The Mamas & the Papas, The Supremes, The Rolling Stones, Glen Campbell, Dusty Springfield, Jackie Wilson, Marvin Gaye, Jay and the Americans, Ronnie Dove, James Brown, Stevie Wonder, The Ronettes, Cher, Simon and Garfunkel, The Byrds, The Toys, The Bobby Fuller Four, Allan Sherman, The Reflections, Lesley Gore, and Gary Lewis & the Playboys, and was taped at KABC-TV's studios in Los Angeles. It began in syndication in April 1965 and ran through May 1966 in more than 150 markets in the U.S. and seven countries internationally. Although it was a syndicated series, Shivaree was produced and owned by the ABC network.

In addition to the host, the show also featured dancers (go-go girls), including Teri Garr, Anita Mann, Cathy Austin, Joane Sannes, and Kay Parks, who danced on elevated platforms behind the bandstand while guest artists performed. Audience members surrounded the bandstand and also stood on a balcony behind the dancers.
