= Bellini (Italian band) =

Indie rock/math rock band

- Genres: Indie rock, math rock
- Years active: 2001–present
- Labels: Temporary Residence Limited, Radio is Down, Monitor Records
- Members: Giovanna Cacciola; Alexis Fleisig; Agostino Tilotta
- Past members: Damon Che; Matthew Taylor
- Website: www.snowingsun.com

Bellini is an international indie rock/math rock band, composed of members from Girls Against Boys, Soulside and Uzeda. This band was named after the Italian composer Vincenzo Bellini.

== History ==
The band was formed after Damon Che's previous band Don Caballero went on hiatus. To start a new outfit he called upon the Italian guitarist Agostino Tilotta. They were joined by Tilotta's wife Giovanna Cacciola (vocals) while Che brought in Matthew Taylor on bass. The four-piece got together with Steve Albini who produced their debut album Snowing Sun, released in 2002. During the subsequent North American tour drummer Che left and was replaced by Alexis Fleisig. In 2005 the band released the album Small Stones, followed by The Precious Prize of Gravity in 2009. Both recorded with the assistance of Steve Albini. A new record was planned for sometime in 2015.

== Members ==
- Giovanna Cacciola – vocals
- Alexis Fleisig – drums
- Agostino Tilotta – guitar

== Past members ==
- Damon Che – drums (2001—2002)
- Matthew Taylor – bass (died 2026)

== Official releases ==
- Snowing Sun, (Monitor Records, Palace Records, 2002)
- Small Stones, (Temporary Residence Limited, 2005)
- The Buffalo Song/Never Again 7" single (Radio is Down, 2004)
- The Precious Prize of Gravity, (Temporary Residence Limited, 2009)
- Before The Day Has Gone, (Temporary Residence Limited, 2018)
