= I Fought the Law =

1960 single by the Crickets

Single by the Crickets

from the album In Style with the Crickets
- A-side: "A Sweet Love"
- Released: December 5, 1960
- Recorded: May 18, 1959
- Genre: Rock and roll
- Length: 2:12
- Label: Coral
- Songwriter: Sonny Curtis
- Producer: Norman Petty

"I Fought the Law" is a song written by Sonny Curtis of the Crickets and popularized by a cover by the Bobby Fuller Four, becoming a top-ten hit for the band in 1966. Their version of the song was ranked No. 175 on the Rolling Stone list of The 500 Greatest Songs of All Time in 2004, and the same year was named one of the 500 "Songs that Shaped Rock" by the Rock and Roll Hall of Fame.

There are several notable covers of the song. A version by Sam Neely charted in 1975. The song was also recorded by the Clash in 1979. A version with different lyrics was recorded by the Dead Kennedys in 1978.

== Original song ==
The song was written in 1958 by Sonny Curtis, and recorded in 1959 when he joined the Crickets, taking the place of Buddy Holly on guitar. Joe B. Mauldin and Jerry Allison continued their positions on the stand-up bass and drums, respectively, while Earl Sinks filled the role for vocals. The song was included on their 1960 album In Style with the Crickets, and the following year appeared as the B-side of their single "A Sweet Love". The song received very little airplay.

Milwaukee's Paul Stefen and the Royal Lancers covered the song in 1962; it provided them with a local hit, but it did not make the national charts. In 1964, Sammy Masters recorded his cover of the song. That same year, the song was recorded by Bobby Fuller and his band on his own Exeter label in El Paso, which solidified the band's popularity in the West Texas area with one of his biggest local hits.

== Bobby Fuller Four version ==
"I Fought the Law"
- Mid-1960s US edition of Bobby Fuller Four recording

Single by the Bobby Fuller Four

from the album I Fought the Law
- B-side: "Little Annie Lou"
- Released: October 1965
- Genre: Garage rock; rock and roll; rockabilly
- Length: 2:17
- Label: Mustang
- Songwriter: Sonny Curtis
- Producer: Bob Keane

The Bobby Fuller Four singles chronology
"Let Her Dance" (1965)	"I Fought the Law" (1965)	"Love's Made a Fool of You" (1966)

After enjoying regional success in Texas, Bobby Fuller and his band decided to switch to a major label—Del-Fi Records under Mustang Records—and they became known as the Bobby Fuller Four. While producing minor hits, the band broke the national top ten when they re-recorded "I Fought the Law" in 1965 with Bobby Fuller (vocals, guitar), Randy Fuller (backing vocals, bass guitar), Jim Reese (backing vocals, guitar), and DeWayne Quirico (drums).

Just six months after the song made its first appearance on the Billboard Top 100 chart, Fuller was found dead from asphyxiation in his mother's car in a parking lot near his Los Angeles apartment. The police declared the death an apparent suicide, but others believe that he was murdered.

The mono and stereo mixes differ in both Fuller's vocals and the guitar riffs.

In 2015, the Bobby Fuller Four version of the song was inducted into the Grammy Hall of Fame.

=== Chart positions ===
Chart (1966)	Peak position
Canadian RPM Top Singles	11
New Zealand (Listener)	4
US Billboard Hot 100	9
UK Singles (Official Charts)	33

== The Clash version ==
"I Fought the Law"
- CD edition of 1988 single release

Single by the Clash

from the EP The Cost of Living
- B-side: "(White Man) In Hammersmith Palais"
- Released: July 26, 1979 (US)
- Genre: Punk rock
- Length: 2:38
- Label: CBS
- Songwriter: Sonny Curtis

The Clash singles chronology
"English Civil War" (1979)	"I Fought the Law" (1979)	"London Calling" (1979)

The Clash reissued singles chronology
"London Calling" (1988)	"I Fought the Law" (1988)	"Return to Brixton" (1990)

In mid-1978, the Clash were working on their second studio album, Give 'Em Enough Rope. Singer Joe Strummer and guitarist Mick Jones flew to San Francisco to record overdubs in September–October at the Automatt studio. The owner of the Automatt kept his collection of classic jukeboxes distributed around the various rooms of the studio complex. Strummer and Jones heard the Bobby Fuller version of "I Fought the Law" for the first time on one of the jukeboxes. Their version first appeared on the EP The Cost of Living in May 1979 in the UK, and later that year was made part of the American edition of the Clash's album The Clash. This cover version helped gain the Clash their first taste of airplay in the States. A live recording of the song, performed at the Lyceum Theatre, West End, London, on December 28, 1978, features as the last piece of the 1980 film Rude Boy, directed by Jack Hazan and David Mingay. The Clash were dressed all in black for that gig, and the song, at that stage, was considered the film's title song. On July 26, 1979, "I Fought the Law" was the first single by the band to be released in the United States.

In 1988, CBS Records re-issued the single (catalog number) in CD, 12-inch and 7-inch vinyl formats, with "City of the Dead" (2:24) and "1977" (1:40) as its 7-inch B-side.

In 1989, during Operation Just Cause, the U.S. military surrounded the Apostolic Nunciature in Panama while trying to capture Manuel Noriega, the strongman of Panama. U.S. forces blasted loud rock music—including "I Fought the Law" by the Clash—to put pressure on Noriega to give himself up.

In 2007, the Clash's version of the song was released as a downloadable track for the music video game series Rock Band.

The 2014 film RoboCop and the 2026 film Coyote vs. Acme both feature the Clash's version of "I Fought the Law" during the end credits. The 2026 film Super Troopers 3 feature the Clash's version of "I Fought the Law" in its official trailer and TV spots.

=== Recording ===
Some of the percussive noises on the record were made by hitting the pipes on a urinal. Jones told Uncut magazine in 2015, "Yeah, we went into the toilets and banged on the pipes with hammers to make it sound like a chain gang. Y'know, that 'clang! clang!' at the end? And then at the very end you can hear a 'sssszzhhh!' That's it flushing!"

=== Personnel ===
- Joe Strummer⁣ – lead vocals and backing vocals, rhythm guitar
- Mick Jones⁣ – lead guitar and backing vocals
- Paul Simonon⁣ – bass and backing vocals
- Topper Headon⁣ – drums

=== Charts ===
Rel.	Year	Chart	Peak position
1st	1979	Irish Singles Chart	24
2nd	1988	New Zealand (Recorded Music NZ)	17
2nd	1988	UK Singles (Official Charts)	29

Weekly chart performance
Chart (2026)	Peak position
Israel International Airplay (Media Forest)	14

=== Certifications ===
Region	Certification	Certified units/sales
New Zealand (RMNZ)	Gold	15,000^{‡}
United Kingdom (BPI)	Gold	400,000^{‡}
^{‡} Sales+streaming figures based on certification alone.

== Other versions ==
- Hank Williams Jr. recorded a version of the song in 1978, which was released on Family Tradition (1979). Released as the album's first single, it was a moderate hit and peaked at number 15 on Billboard's Hot Country Singles & Tracks chart, giving Williams his first Top 15 single in four years.
- Dead Kennedys adapted "I Fought the Law" shortly after San Francisco politician Dan White murdered city Supervisor Harvey Milk and Mayor George Moscone in November 1978. Most of the lyrics were re-written so the song was from White's point of view; the chorus was changed to "I fought the law, and I won", with the final line in the final chorus changed to "I am the law, so I won." The song portrays White as someone who got away with first-degree premeditated murder and is unrepentant about it and specifically cites his use of the diminished responsibility defense. It also makes use of the reference "Twinkie defense", where lead singer Jello Biafra sings "Twinkies are the best friend I ever had". During Biafra's campaign for the office of Mayor of San Francisco, he proposed erecting statues of Dan White around the city and allowing the parks department to sell eggs and tomatoes with which people could pelt the statues.
- Sam Neely's version of the song went to No. 54 on the Billboard pop charts and No. 61 on the country charts in 1975. Another country version by the Nitty Gritty Dirt Band went to No. 66 in 1992.
- Bob Rivers released a parody version titled I Fought the Lawn in 2002.
- Green Day's version of the song was used in 2004 for a Pepsi/iTunes commercial that premiered during Super Bowl XXXVIII.
- "I Fought the Lloyds" was a comedy version released in 2008 by British band Oystar in support of the campaign by Lloyds TSB customers mounting legal challenges to get their charges refunded. In this version, lyrics were changed; the key line became "I fought the Lloyds and Lloyds lost". It reached No. 25 on the UK Singles Chart.
- Colin Farrell recorded a version in 2003 for the Irish black comedy crime film Intermission directed by John Crowley and written by Mark O'Rowe.
- Status Quo did a cover version of the song for the 2003 studio album Riffs.
- Grateful Dead performed the song over thirty times between 1993 and 1995.
