= Surfer Joe Summer Festival =

Annual music event in Livorno, Italy

- Genre: surf music, beat music, instrumental, exotica
- Dates: Usually last weekend in June
- Locations: Livorno, Tuscany, Italy
- Years active: 2003-2004, 2008-2019, 2023–present
- Founders: Lorenzo and Luca Valdambrini
- Website: surferjoemusic.com: surferjoemusic.com

The Surfer Joe Summer Festival, also known as SJSF, is an annual music festival dedicated to surf music organized by Surfer Joe Music that is held in Livorno, Italy.

The multi-day event features live performances from surf and instrumental bands on multiple stages, symposia and workshops dedicated to the history and techniques of surf music, displays of historic musical instruments, movie screenings, musician meet and greets, dancing to DJs, and a shopping marketplace.

== History ==
The festival was created and founded in 2003 by Lorenzo Valdambrini (aka Surfer Joe), who went on to organize the first two editions.

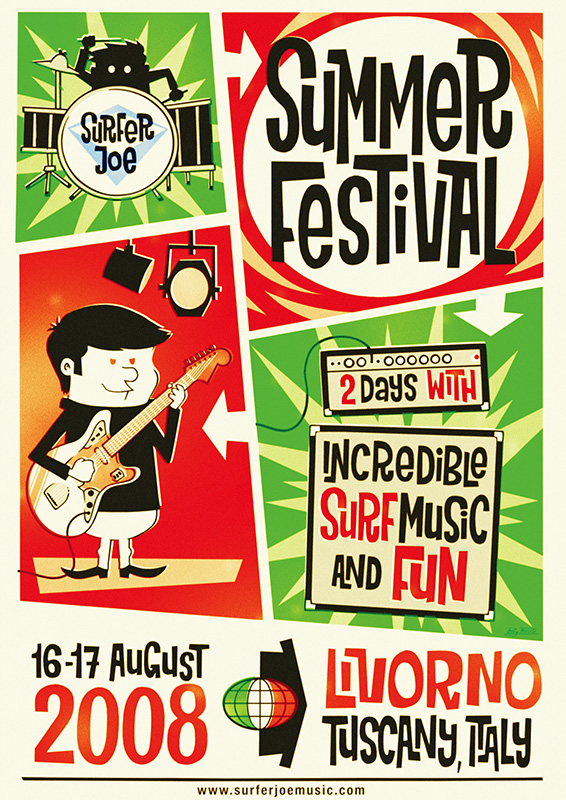
2008 Poster by Fred Lammers

After a 4 year break, in 2008, Lorenzo's brother Luca Valdambrini encouraged relaunching the event and formed the official cultural association Surfer Joe Music, which would organize the event moving forward.

Since 2012, the festival has taken place at, and outside, of Surfer Joe’s Diner on Livorno's seafront promenade, Terrazza Mascagni.

== International recognition ==
Massimo Ponte writes: "The SJSF is considered the largest surf music event on this planet".

John Blair mentions it in his book Southern California surf music, 1960-1966: "Today, surf instrumental bands are all over the planet. There is a sizeable core audience that grows every year. Several websites are devoted to this music, and large surf music festivals are held annually in places such as Orange County (SG101 Convention), Italy (Surfer Joe Summer Fest) [...]. You do not have to search very far to find surf music these days".

Timothy J. Cooley mentions the festival in his book Surfing About Music: "...in the winter of 2003, he [Valdambrini] began producing shows featuring bands playing Surf Music at several venues in Italy, followed by a series of Surfin' Sundays events that paired Italian and International bands. The summer was rounded out with the first Summer Festival of Surf Music, held on the beach of Marina di Massa, a small town north of Pisa"

Kent Crowley writes in his book Surf beat: rock 'n' roll's forgotten revolution: "Ten years later, surf music attained a new measure of respect abroad when an Italian enthusiast named Lorenzo Valdambrini established an annual international festival. Named after the Surfaris song, the Surfer Joe Summer Festival has for nearly a decade celebrated California's first modern indigenous folk music..."
