= Matthew Taylor (musician) =

American musician (1968–2026)

Matthew Taylor (July 1, 1968 – January 8, 2026) was an American musician and artist.

== Life and career ==
Taylor was born in Miami, Florida, in 1968. He was a student at the School of the Art Institute of Chicago in the late 1980s and early 1990s, where he studied music composition and improvisation under John Corbett.

He was a founding member of the Sicilian American indie rock band Bellini. Taylor was also a member of the band Vertical Scratchers. He performed in the Glenn Branca 100 Guitars symphony, Don Caballero, Girls Against Boys, Paramount Styles, Rhys Chatham's "A Crimson Grail" for 200 guitars and 16 basses performance at Lincoln Center, "A Crimson Grail" for 100 guitars and 8 basses performance at Liverpool Cathedral as part of the 2012 Liverpool Biennial, and "A Secret Rose" for 100 electric guitars in Richmond, California, Oktober People, backing vocals with A Hawk and a Hacksaw and collaborated in the improv Cobra//group and Death Convention Singers with Raven Chacon.

Taylor also served as producer and music supervisor for the award-winning documentary Torey's Distraction, whose soundtrack was composed by Jimmy LaValle of The Album Leaf.

He also worked as the art director for the seminal and independent record label Touch and Go Records in the early 1990s, designing album covers for such bands as Slint, the Jesus Lizard, Shellac, Nirvana, Tortoise, Don Caballero, Palace Brothers, Big Black, Laughing Hyenas, Pavement, Didjits, Rodan, Scratch Acid, Big Boys, Negative Approach, Killdozer, and Girls Against Boys.

Taylor later resided in Dallas, Texas, where he was a casting director and owner of Buffalo Casting. He died from a heart attack on January 8, 2026.
