= Del-Fi Records =

Defunct American record label

- Parent company: Warner Music Group
- Founded: 1958
- Founder: Bob Keane
- Defunct: 2003
- Status: Defunct
- Distributor: Self-distributed
- Genre: Various
- Country of origin: U.S.
- Location: Hollywood, California

Del-Fi Records was an American independent record label based in Hollywood, California, founded in 1958 and owned by Bob Keane.

The label's first single released was "Caravan" by Henri Rose in 1958, but the label was most famous for signing Ritchie Valens. Valens' first single for the label was "Come On Let's Go", which was a hit. His next single, "Donna"/"La Bamba", was an even bigger hit, and brought national notoriety to the label. However, Johnny Crawford recorded more hit singles with Del-Fi than any other artist.

The label was most active in the 1950s and '60s, but has occasionally issued newer recordings and maintains its back catalog in conjunctions with Rhino Records.

== History ==
In 1966, legal action was taken against Del-Fi by attorney Al Schlesinger for Anthony Music, which filed a $122,000 suit over breach of contract, fraud and money owed. The principal stockholder of the company, Anthony Hilder, claimed the dispute was over royalties not being paid as per an alleged agreement for the masters of albums by the Centurians, Dave Myers and The Surftones, and the Sentinels, and the LP Battle of the Surf Bands.

== Sister labels ==
Keane soon launched Stereo-Fi Records and Donna Records as sister labels. Donna Records was started in 1959, named after Ritchie Valens' hit of the same name. By 1965, Bob Keane felt the Del-Fi and Donna labels were aging, so the Bronco Records and Mustang Records labels were started in their place, capitalizing on their new, exciting themes. The Mustang label achieved fame through Bobby Fuller Four (previously on Donna Records), producing their biggest hit, "I Fought the Law" in 1965. Their fame continued into 1966, with assistance from the then A&R man Barry White, but Fuller's death later that year brought a halt to the label, and Mustang Records closed down in 1967.

== Legacy ==
Del-Fi was briefly revived in 1987 for 7" and 12" releases of "La Bamba '87", featuring remixes of the Richie Valens classic, capitalizing on the success of the film La Bamba. Keane resurrected the Del-Fi label in 1995 and reissued many original recordings on CD (some under the Donna label), and signed some new acts as well. In September 2003, Bob Keane sold the Del-Fi and its subsidiaries to the Warner Music Group. Today it is run under Rhino Entertainment and reissues some of its older material.

== Various artist compilations ==
In 1999, the label released Del-Fi Girl Groups: Gee Baby Gee. Compiled and annotated by Steve Stanley, the CD featured 21 vintage tracks from the Del-Fi label. They were by girl groups and singers such as the Ladybugs, Brenda Holloway, Pippy Shannon, Lori Martin, Pierre And Anne-Lyse, Desda, Mary Sawrey, and seven tracks by The Sisters, a group that featured Ersi Arvizu.

== New recordings ==
One band that has recorded for the label is the El Caminos, a Japanese surf music band who had their 1997 album Reverb Explosion released on Del-Fi. It got to number 12 on the CMJ Core Radio chart.

== Artists ==
- Addrisi Brothers
- Eden Ahbez
- The Centurians
- Johnny Crawford
- Bobby Curtola
- Bobby Fuller Four (Donna & Mustang)
- Roy Gaines
- The Gallahads
- Ron Holden (Donna)
- Brenda Holloway
- The Impacts
- Bruce Johnston
- Little Caesar & the Romans
- The Lively Ones
- Outrageous Cherry
- Josephine Roberto aka 'Banig'
- Chan Romero
- Spider Webb and the Insects (Tom Fogerty's early band)
- Ritchie Valens
- Barry White (Bronco)
- Frank Zappa
- Ersi Arvizu

=== Later artists ===
- The El Caminos
- Kari Wuhrer

== See also ==
- Bob Keane
- Ritchie Valens
- List of record labels
