= Bob Keane =

American record producer and musician (1922–2009)

- Bob Keane's book about his life in the music industry
- Born: Robert Verrill Kuhn; January 5, 1922; Manhattan Beach, California, United States
- Died: November 28, 2009 (aged 87)
- Occupation(s): Musician, record producer, record label founder

Robert Verrill Kuhn (January 5, 1922 – November 28, 2009), professionally known as Bob Keane, and also sometimes known as Bob Keene, was an American musician, producer and the founder and owner of the record label Del-Fi Records. He was the producer and manager of Ritchie Valens and Pinoy star Josephine Roberto, aka Banig.

== Death ==
Keane was diagnosed with non-Hodgkin's lymphoma when he was 87, and died of kidney failure on November 28, 2009.

== See also ==
- Keen Records
