= Revolution Rock =

Song by The Clash

from the album London Calling
- Released: 14 December 1979
- Recorded: June–July 1979
- Genre: Reggae
- Length: 5:37
- Label: CBS
- Songwriters: Jackie Edwards; Danny Ray
- Producer: Guy Stevens

London Calling track listing
- 19 tracks Side one: 1. "London Calling"; 2. "Brand New Cadillac"; 3. "Jimmy Jazz"; 4. "Hateful"; 5. "Rudie Can't Fail"; Side two: 1. "Spanish Bombs"; 2. "The Right Profile"; 3. "Lost in the Supermarket"; 4. "Clampdown"; 5. "The Guns of Brixton"; Side three: 1. "Wrong 'Em Boyo"; 2. "Death or Glory"; 3. "Koka Kola"; 4. "The Card Cheat"; Side four: 1. "Lover's Rock"; 2. "Four Horseman"; 3. "I'm Not Down"; 4. "Revolution Rock"; 5. "Train in Vain"

"Revolution Rock" is a song written and first recorded by reggae singer Danny Ray and released as a single in 1976; Ray's recording incorporates elements of Jackie Edwards's earlier song "Get Up", leading to the Ray/Edwards co-credit. The Clash covered "Revolution Rock" for their third studio album London Calling (1979).

Critics have described the Clash's arrangement as reggae-driven with prominent staccato horn refrains and a "call-and-response" effect fashioned by Joe Strummer’s vocal phrasing alongside the track's instrumentation. It was originally going to close London Calling, but "Train in Vain" was added at the last minute. There was another reggae song of the same title released in 1973 by roots reggae mic chanter and toaster, Big Youth and ska singer, Prince Buster. According to Ray, "The lyrics come from going to the clubs and seeing what was going on, you know?"

The song features a staccato horn refrain and "sinuous" guitar stylings. According to Sean Egan, "Strummer uses his voice almost as an instrument in the way he cleverly manufactures the illusion of call and response with already recorded instruments." An instrumental version of the song was featured on the Rude Boy film. "Revolution Rock" was a staple in live shows from the end of 1979 to 1981. According to Billboard, "With the help of sidemen the Irish Horns, the Clash get downright giddy."

The horn section on London Calling—credited as the Irish Horns—comprised trombonist Chris Gower, trumpeter Dick Hanson, and saxophonists John Earle and Ray Beavis.

The last verse (El Clash combo / Paid fifteen dollars a day / Weddings, parties, anything / And Bongo Jazz a speciality) inspired the naming of the Australian group Weddings Parties Anything.

Argentine rock band Los Fabulosos Cadillacs covered this song with lyrics in Spanish in their third studio album El Ritmo Mundial, released in 1988.

== Bibliography ==
- Egan, Sean (2014). The Clash: The Only Band That Mattered. Rowman & Littlefield. ISBN 978-0810888760.
- Gray, Marcus (2010). Route 19 Revisited: The Clash and London Calling. Soft Skull Press. ISBN 978-1593763916.
- Salewicz, Chris (2008). Redemption Song: The Ballad of Joe Strummer. Farrar, Straus and Giroux. ISBN 978-0865479821.
