= City Rockers: A Tribute to The Clash =

Compilation album by various artists
- Released: July 6, 1999
- Genre: Punk rock
- Label: Chord Records

Professional ratings
Review scores
Source	Rating
Allmusic	2/5 stars

City Rockers: A Tribute To The Clash is a tribute album to the punk rock band The Clash.

== Track listing ==
1. "Death or Glory" – Dave Smalley
2. "Clampdown" – Hot Water Music
3. "Hate & War" – Murphy's Law
4. "Hateful" – Kid Dynamite
5. "Clash City Rockers" – Saves the Day
6. "Guns of Brixton" – Dropkick Murphys
7. "Brand New Cadillac" – Incognegro
8. "Rock the Casbah" – Demonspeed
9. "Lost in the Supermarket" – Lady Luck
10. "Should I Stay or Should I Go" – Error Type 11
11. "Lose this Skin" – Stubborn All-Stars
12. "London Calling" – One King Down
13. "Train In Vain" – Ill Repute
14. "Garageland" – The Sick
15. "White Riot" – Fang
16. "Career Opportunities" – Stigmata
17. "Straight to Hell" – Skinnerbox
18. "Tommy Gun" – The Mob
