= The Story of the Clash, Volume 1 =

Compilation album by The Clash
- Released: 21 March 1988
- Genre: Punk rock
- Length: 99:00
- Label: Epic
- Producers: The Clash; Guy Stevens; Bill Price; Mikey Dread; Mickey Foote; Lee Perry; Sandy Pearlman

The Clash compilations and lives chronology
Black Market Clash (1980)	The Story of the Clash, Volume 1 (1988)	1977 Revisited (1990)

Singles from The Story of the Clash, Volume 1
- 1. "I Fought the Law" Released: March 1988; 2. "London Calling" Released: May 1988

Professional ratings
Review scores
Source	Rating
AllMusic	4/5 stars
Rolling Stone	3.5/5 stars
Robert Christgau	C+

The Story of the Clash, Vol. 1 is a double-disc compilation album by the English punk rock band the Clash. Consisting of 28 tracks, it was released on 21 March 1988 by Epic Records. The compilation presents a relatively thorough overview of their career, but does not feature any material from their final studio album, Cut the Crap (1985). An anticipated second volume was to have consisted of live recordings but remains unreleased, although a live compilation, From Here to Eternity: Live, was released in 1999. The original vinyl set was released with four different coloured cover variations: red, blue, yellow and green. The compilation was promoted by reissued singles of "I Fought the Law" and "London Calling".

== Liner notes ==
The extensive inner notes are told from the perspective of frontman Joe Strummer's alter-ego, Albert Transom. Transom, described by himself as "...their valet from the early beginnings to the bitter end...", tells many anecdotes, including one about the beginning of the rioting at the Notting Hill Carnival in 1976. Many of the stories are about shows, such as one where, after their "3rd or 4th time out", Transom and a fellow punk named Sebastian barricaded themselves in a small room and were attacked by a group of "Teddy Boys". The story went that Sebastian's tie was ripped, and the general consensus was that the tie was now "much more punk". Many other musicians are mentioned in the liners, including experiences with Bo Diddley, Devo, and Roxy Music. The notes end with, "If I had to sum it up, I'd say we played every gig on the face of the earth and that's what it's all about...I've just heard they'll give me some room on Vol. 2 so maybe I will be able to tell the bits I've had to skip or leave out."

== Track listing ==
All tracks are written by Joe Strummer and Mick Jones, except where noted.

Disc 1
No.	Title	Writer(s)	Original release	Length
1.	"The Magnificent Seven"	The Clash	12-inch version; original version from Sandinista! (1980)	4:27
2.	"Rock the Casbah"	The Clash	single mix; original version from Combat Rock (1982)	3:41
3.	"This Is Radio Clash"	The Clash	Non-album single (1981)	4:10
4.	"Should I Stay or Should I Go"	The Clash	Combat Rock	3:07
5.	"Straight to Hell"	The Clash	Combat Rock	5:27
6.	"Armagideon Time"	Willi Williams, Jackie Mittoo	B-side of "London Calling" single (1979)	3:50
7.	"Clampdown"		London Calling (1979)	3:45
8.	"Train in Vain"		London Calling	3:11
9.	"The Guns of Brixton"	Paul Simonon	London Calling	3:05
10.	"I Fought the Law"	Sonny Curtis	The Cost of Living EP (1979)	2:35
11.	"Somebody Got Murdered"	The Clash	Sandinista!	3:29
12.	"Lost in the Supermarket"		London Calling	3:41
13.	"Bankrobber"		Non-album single (1980)	4:31

Disc 2
No.	Title	Writer(s)	Original release	Length
1.	"(White Man) In Hammersmith Palais"		Non-album single (1978)	3:59
2.	"London's Burning"		The Clash (1977)	2:09
3.	"Janie Jones"		The Clash	2:04
4.	"Tommy Gun"		Give 'Em Enough Rope (1978)	3:13
5.	"Complete Control"		Non-album single (1977)	3:12
6.	"Capital Radio One" (preceded by Circle Line interview part 2)"		Capital Radio EP (1977)	5:18
7.	"White Riot"		Single version, 18 March 1977	1:57
8.	"Career Opportunities"		The Clash	1:51
9.	"Clash City Rockers"		Non-album single (1978)	3:57
10.	"Safe European Home"		Give 'Em Enough Rope	3:48
11.	"Stay Free"		Give 'Em Enough Rope	3:37
12.	"London Calling"		London Calling	3:19
13.	"Spanish Bombs"		London Calling	3:18
14.	"English Civil War"	Trad. arr. Strummer/Jones	Give 'Em Enough Rope	2:33
15.	"Police & Thieves"	Junior Murvin, Lee "Scratch" Perry	The Clash	5:57

== Personnel ==
The Clash

- Mick Jones – guitar, vocals
- Joe Strummer – vocals, guitar
- Paul Simonon – bass
- Topper Headon – drums
- Terry Chimes – drums on disc 2, track 2, tracks 7–8, and track 15

Technical

- Tricia Ronane – compiler
- Pennie Smith – photography
- Jules Balme – sleeve
- The Clash – producer ("The Magnificent Seven", "This Is Radio Clash", "Armagideon Time", "Somebody Got Murdered", "(White Man) in Hammersmith Palais"), co-producer ("I Fought the Law", "Capital Radio One")
- Guy Stevens – producer ("Clampdown", "Train in Vain", "Guns of Brixton", "Lost in the Supermarket", "London Calling", "Spanish Bombs")
- Bill Price – co-producer ("I Fought the Law", "Capital Radio One"), remastering supervision (1999 version)
- Mikey Dread – producer ("Bankrobber")
- Mickey Foote – producer ("London's Burning", "Janie Jones", "White Riot", "Career Opportunities", "Clash City Rockers", "Police and Thieves"), co-producer ("Complete Control")
- Lee "Scratch" Perry – co-producer ("Complete Control")
- Sandy Pearlman – producer ("Tommy Gun", "Safe European Home", "Stay Free")
- Mick Jones – remixing ("Rock the Casbah", "Should I Stay or Should I Go")
- Bob Clearmountain – engineer ("Rock the Casbah", "Should I Stay or Should I Go", "English Civil War")
- Glyn Johns – mixing ("Straight to Hell")
- Howie Weinberg – mastering
- Ray Staff – remastering (1999 version)
- Bob Whitney – remastering (1999 version)

== Charts ==
Chart (1988–1991)	Peak position
Australian Albums (Kent Music Report)	52
Canada Top Albums/CDs (RPM)	45
Finnish Albums (The Official Finnish Charts)	22
German Albums (Offizielle Top 100)	50
Italian Albums (Musica e Dischi)	22
New Zealand Albums (RMNZ)	3
Swedish Albums (Sverigetopplistan)	50
UK Albums (Official Charts)	7
US Billboard 200	142

== Certifications ==
Region	Certification	Certified units/sales
France (SNEP)	2× Gold	200,000^{*}
New Zealand (RMNZ)	Gold	7,500^{^}
United Kingdom (BPI)	Gold	100,000^{^}
United States (RIAA)	Platinum	1,000,000^{^}
^{*} Sales figures based on certification alone.^{^} Shipments figures based on certification alone.
