= Burning London: The Clash Tribute =

Compilation album by Various Artists
- Released: March 16, 1999
- Genre: Punk rock
- Label: Epic
- Producer: Wayne Connolly, John Doe, Greg Dulli, Stephan Jenkins, David Kahne, Moby, Scotch Ralston, Ralph Sall

Professional ratings
Review scores
Source	Rating
Allmusic	1.5/5 stars
Rolling Stone	2.5/5 stars

Burning London: The Clash Tribute is a tribute album to the English punk rock band The Clash. It was released in 1999. A portion of the proceeds from the sales of Burning London will benefit the High Risk Youth Program of the Children's Hospital Los Angeles.

== Track listing ==
No.	Title	Writer(s)	Producer(s)	Length
1.	"Hateful" (No Doubt)	Joe Strummer; Mick Jones	David Kahne	2:58
2.	"This Is Radio Clash" (The Urge)	Strummer; Jones; Topper Headon; Paul Simonon	Mr. Colson; The Urge	3:20
3.	"Should I Stay or Should I Go" (Ice Cube and Mack 10)	The Clash	Dutch	4:05
4.	"Cheat" (Rancid)	Strummer; Jones	Rancid	2:03
5.	"Train in Vain" (Third Eye Blind)	Strummer; Jones	Stephan Jenkins	3:16
6.	"Clampdown" (Indigo Girls)	Strummer; Jones	Ralph Sall	3:16
7.	"Rudie Can't Fail" (The Mighty Mighty Bosstones)	Strummer; Jones	John Doe	3:38
8.	"(White Man) In Hammersmith Palais" (311)	Strummer; Jones	Scotch Ralston; 311	3:52
9.	"Lost in the Supermarket" (The Afghan Whigs)	Strummer; Jones	Greg Dulli	4:39
10.	"White Riot" (Cracker)	Strummer; Jones	John Morand	2:49
11.	"London's Burning" (Silverchair)	Strummer; Jones	Wayne Connolly	3:15
12.	"Straight to Hell" (Moby featuring Heather Nova)	The Clash	Moby	4:36

European edition bonus tracks
No.	Title	Writer(s)	Length
13.	"Guns of Brixton" (Unwritten Law)	Paul Simonon	3:20
14.	"Rock The Casbah" (Pato Banton and Ranking Roger)	The Clash	4:08
15.	"Tommy Gun" (Face to Face)	Strummer; Jones	2:58
