= Lost in the Supermarket =

1979 song by the Clash

Song by the Clash

from the album London Calling
- Released: 14 December 1979
- Recorded: 1979
- Studio: Wessex (London)
- Genre: Post-punk; new wave; pop; R&B; soul
- Length: 3:47
- Label: CBS
- Songwriter: Joe Strummer
- Producer: Guy Stevens

"Lost in the Supermarket" is a song by the English rock band the Clash from their third studio album, London Calling (1979). A post-punk, new wave, pop, R&B, and soul song, it was written by Joe Strummer imagining Mick Jones' childhood growing up. Its lyrics contain two different storylines: one about how consumerism had led to unavoidable political apathy, and one about growing up in a basement while hearing things happening around you. The song was recorded during the sessions for London Calling in 1979, and was produced by Guy Stevens. Since its release, critics have deemed "Lost in the Supermarket" a standout on London Calling despite it never being released as a single. Several covers have been released, such as Ben Folds' rendition for the 2006 film Over the Hedge.

== Background and composition ==
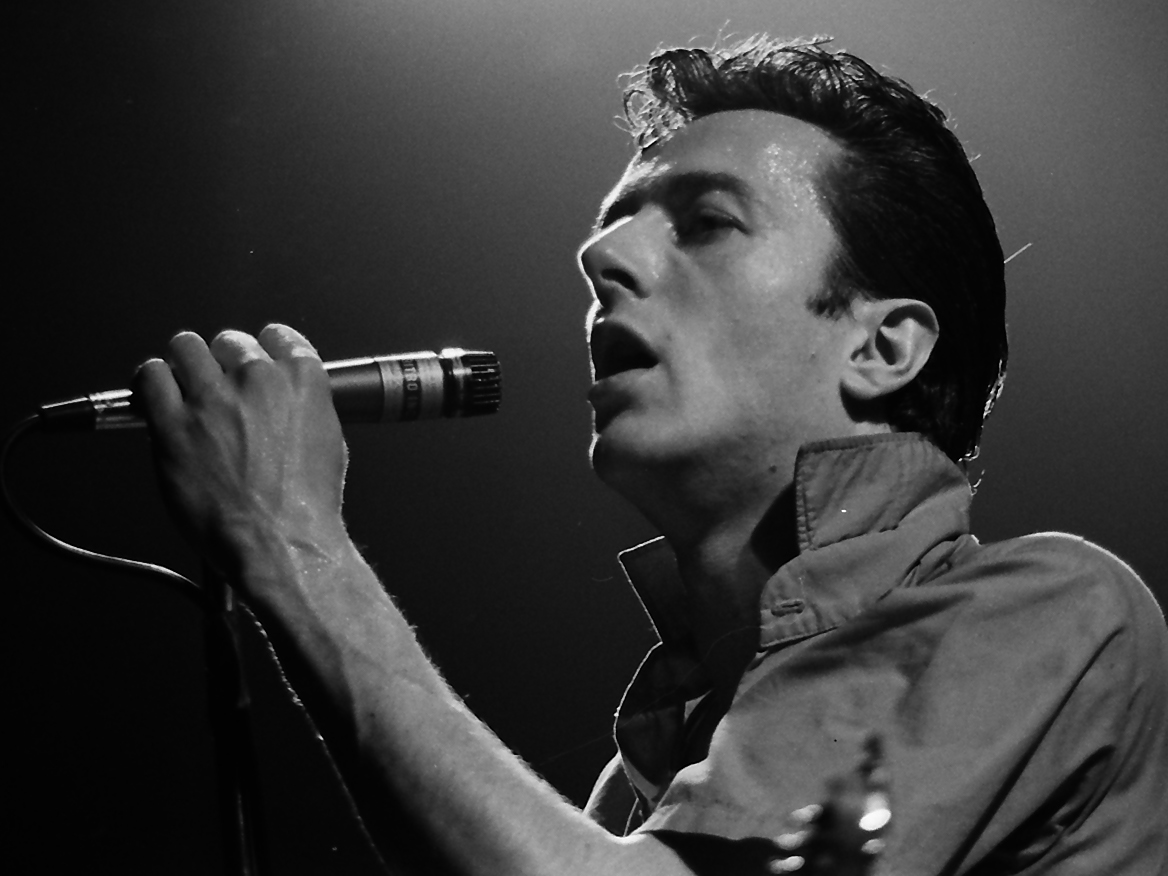
"Lost in the Supermarket" was written by Joe Strummer (pictured in 1980) after envisioning what Mick Jones' childhood was like.

Following the positive reception of their second studio album, Give 'Em Enough Rope (1978), the Clash began working on their follow-up album in mid-1979. They hosted a series of rehearsals dubbed The Vanilla Tapes at Vanilla Studios in London. "Lost in the Supermarket" was one of the many new songs that the band rehearsed during this time. Joe Strummer wrote it after picturing Mick Jones' childhood life, describing it as his "wistful gift" to Jones. Although the song is credited to the Strummer and Jones songwriting partnership, the duo have each identified "Lost in the Supermarket" as having been written entirely by Strummer. Strummer recalled in 1999: "The song was conceived in the supermarket under a block of flats, next to a parking lot. It was 5 a.m., and the song occurred to me as I stumbled around, dazed by the colors and the lights."

Musically, "Lost in the Supermarket" is a post-punk, pop, R&B, and soul song. It has a length of three minutes and 47 seconds. According to writer Martin Popoff, there are two different storylines present in the lyrics. The first is consumerism, and how it led to unavoidable political apathy ("I'm all tuned in, I see all the programmes / I save coupons from packets of tea"). The other is growing up in a basement, hearing the "kids in the halls" and the "pipes in the walls" ("The kids in the halls and the pipes in the walls"), and also hearing parents arguing. Donald A. Guarisco of AllMusic stated the song builds on a bass line, and adds "mellow guitar riffs" and "fast-paced" drums to "flesh [its] sound out". Biographers John Tobler and Barry Miles noted that Strummer's "urban psychosis" was present on "Lost in the Supermarket".

== Recording and release ==
The Clash went into Wessex Sound Studios in Highbury, London, in August 1979 to begin recording London Calling; they recorded "Lost in the Supermarket" during the sessions for the album in 1979. Guy Stevens served as producer, while Jerry Green was the second engineer. Topper Headon used a tom-tom drum on the song instead of a snare drum after seeing Taj Mahal's drummer doing the same thing in a concert the night before the recording. The excessive layering of instruments, such as Paul Simonon's bass guitar, made performing the song live a difficult task.

London Calling was released in the United Kingdom on 14 December 1979, with "Lost in the Supermarket" sequenced as the third track on side two, placed between "The Right Profile" and "Clampdown". "Lost in the Supermarket" also appeared on the compilation albums The Story of the Clash, Volume 1 (1988), Clash on Broadway (1991), The Essential Clash (2003), and Singles Box (2006). It also appeared on the box sets 5 Album Studio Set and Sound System in 2013 respectively.

In a contemporary review of London Calling, an anonymous writer at Record Mirror noted that "Lost in the Supermarket" "points out the gap between the processed image of happiness in advertising and its reality", and stated that it showed "the Clash at their most self - conscious". Guarisco deemed it as "a song that skillfully satirizes the mundane nature of civilized city life without ever losing sympathy for the people who live it". Chris Harvey of The Independent praised Jones' high–pitched voice, crediting it for bringing the Clash to America when it was used on the third single from the album, "Train in Vain". While never released as a single, it has been considered a standout on London Calling, and has been considered a fan favorite in the band's discography.

== Cover versions ==
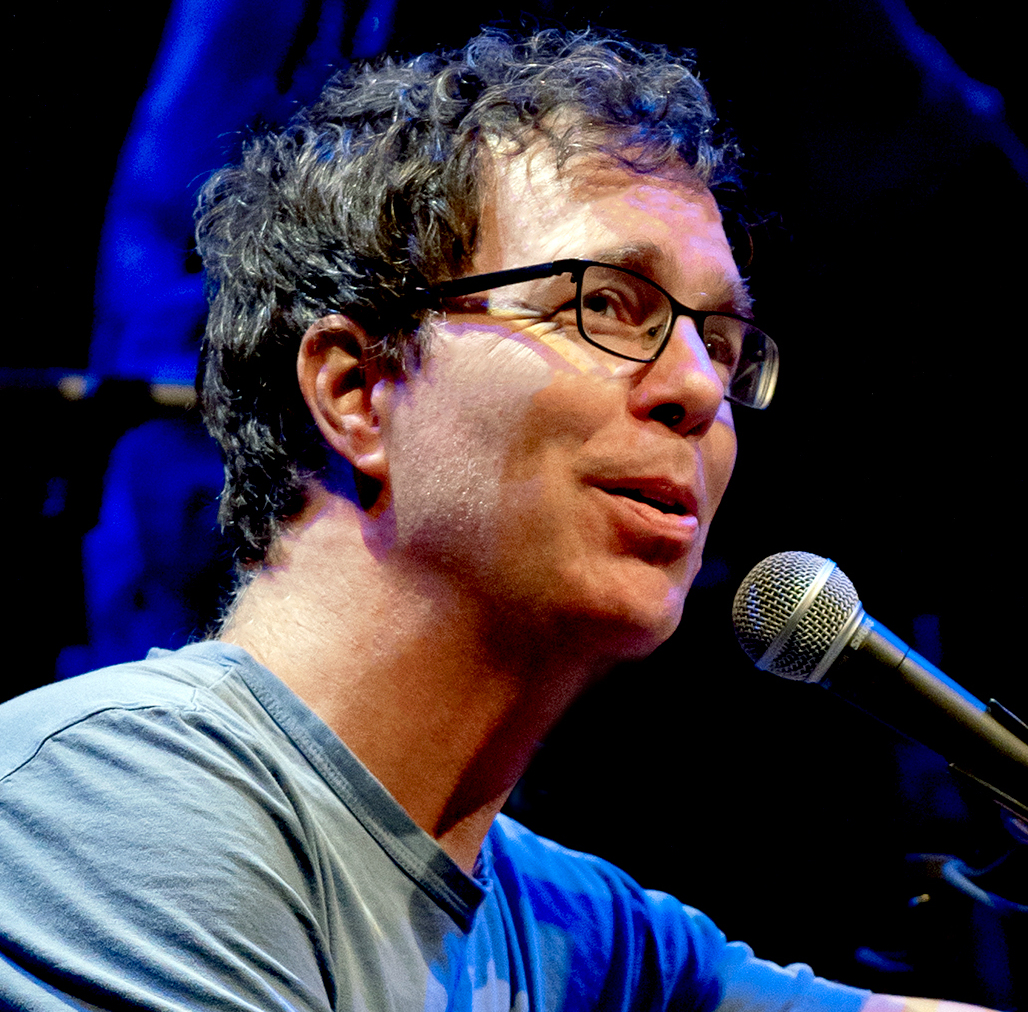
Ben Folds (pictured in 2023) released a cover of "Lost in the Supermarket" for the 2006 film Over the Hedge.

In 1999, a tribute album was released through Epic Records, titled Burning London: The Clash Tribute. The American rock band The Afghan Whigs covered "Lost in the Supermarket" for inclusion on the album. Lead singer Greg Dulli decided to ad-lib several lyrics from other songs onto the outro, such as "Train in Vain" and Ben E. King's "Stand by Me" (1961). Keith Phillips of The A.V. Club called it a "soulful rendition". Lady Luck and Battershell both performed covers of the song for the tribute albums City Rockers: A Tribute to The Clash (1999) and Backlash – Tribute to The Clash respectively. Davorin Bogović covered the song for his 1998 album, Sretno dijete (Happy Child), his version entitled "Izgubio sam dragu ženu" ("I Lost a Woman Dear to Me"). Yo Yo Mundi also covered the song in 2005, and the American singer-songwriter Ben Folds recorded it for the soundtrack to the 2006 American comedy film Over the Hedge.

== Personnel ==
Credits are adapted from the liner notes of London Calling.

Locations

- Recorded at Wessex Sound Studios (Highbury, London)

Credits

The Clash
- Mick Jones – vocals, guitar
- Joe Strummer – vocals, rhythm guitar, songwriter
- Paul Simonon – vocals, bass guitar
- Topper Headon – drums, percussion
Additional personnel
- Guy Stevens – producer
- Jerry Green – second engineer
