= Political views and activism of Bruce Springsteen =

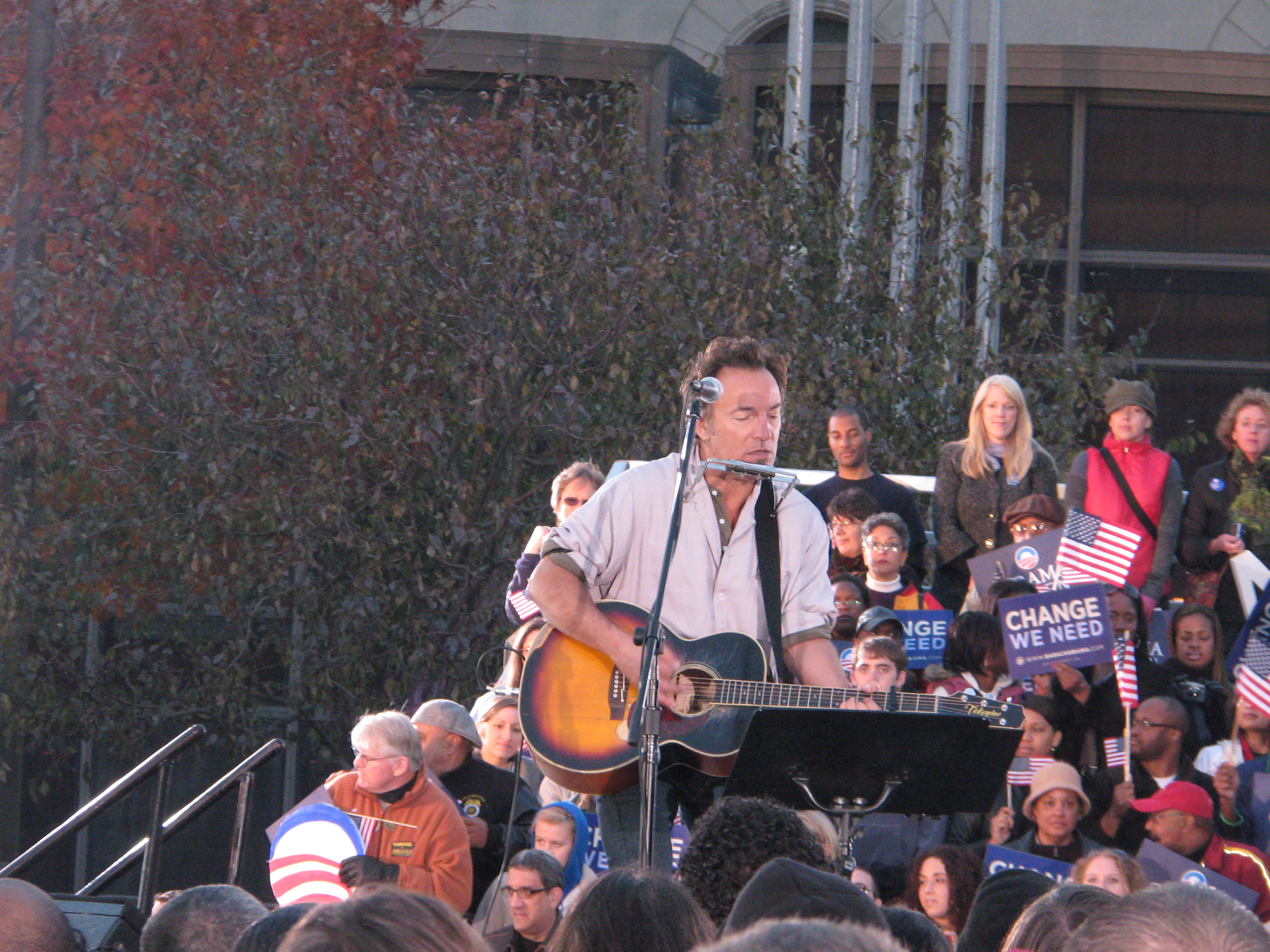
Bruce Springsteen at a campaign rally for Barack Obama's 2008 presidential campaign in Cleveland, Ohio, on November 2, 2008.

Bruce Springsteen is an American singer, songwriter, and musician who has been a political activist since the 1980s. Early in his career, he was apolitical and refrained from making political statements. Starting in the late 1970s and into the 1980s, he began voicing his political views, particularly against Ronald Reagan, and began donating to food banks across America.

Since 2004, Springsteen has endorsed every democratic presidential candidate, beginning with John Kerry and most recently with Kamala Harris. Some candidates have used his music for their campaigns. For example, Kerry used "No Surrender" (1984) as his campaign song, while Barack Obama and Joe Biden used "We Take Care of Our Own" (2012) as theirs; "My Hometown" (1984) also appeared in an ad for Biden's 2020 presidential campaign. Springsteen is also an advocate for LGBTQ rights and gay marriage. His 1994 single "Streets of Philadelphia" addressed the inner feelings of a gay person.

Springsteen has injected political themes into his songwriting. Some, including "Roulette" (1979) and "American Skin (41 Shots)" (2000), directly address real-life events. "Born in the U.S.A." (1984) concerns the mistreatment of Vietnam veterans upon their return home after the Vietnam War. Its message became widely misunderstood as a patriotic anthem.

Since the late 2010s and into the 2020s, Springsteen has been a staunch critic of Donald Trump, openly voicing his disdain for him in campaign videos and during concerts. His 2026 Land of Hope and Dreams American Tour, in particular, is a response to the president.

== Early career ==
Early in his career, Springsteen was apolitical. As a musician performing in the 1960s, his sobriety from drugs and alcohol clashed with hippies and counterculture of the decade. Springsteen recalled: "Generationally, everything was politicized. I didn't know anybody who didn't at least feign interest. If you didn't, you had to adopt a pose of some sort." In July 1972, Springsteen performed at a fundraiser for George McGovern's presidential campaign in Red Bank, New Jersey. Springsteen's friend Howard Grant remembered him being visibly uncomfortable about the event, but retained that "Bruce was going to support anyone who was running against Richard Nixon". Springsteen voted in the election, but believed voicing support for a candidate was risky for his career at the time: "To get involved in any sort of thing where you had to go in and identify yourself? That was going way beyond anything any of us cared to do."

One of Springsteen's first political endeavours was his and the E Street Band's participation in the No Nukes benefit concerts for Musicians United for Safe Energy at Madison Square Garden in mid-September 1979. Up to this point, Springsteen believed that his music "carried its own power". Nevertheless, by 1979, Springsteen wanted to connect his music "with some tangible action". He believed his and the band's presence at the shows offered an indirect statement on his beliefs. Jackson Browne spoke about their appearance at the shows: "[Springsteen] was kind of an icon, with a sense of rebellion and honesty. Having someone like Bruce on the show gave us a validity and legitimacy among people in the street."

Springsteen began injecting political messages into his songwriting around this time. "Roulette", an outtake from The River sessions, was written following the 1979 Three Mile Island accident and addressed the dangers of nuclear energy. Another song, possibly called "They Killed Him in the Street", was about the assassination of Archbishop Óscar Romero in El Salvador. According to Marc Dolan, this song "would have been one of the earliest references in U.S. pop music to right-wing capitalist terrorism in Central America."

== Initial statements and activism ==
Springsteen made a rare political statement during the River Tour at the show in Tempe, Arizona, on November 5, 1980, the day following Ronald Reagan's election as president. Springsteen, who disliked Reagan's stance against the Soviet Union and other Eastern countries, stated: "I don't know what you guys think about what happened last night, but I think it's pretty frightening." Springsteen had already begun performing a cover of Woody Guthrie's "This Land Is Your Land" (1945) that added social commentary to the shows; he soon after began playing Creedence Clearwater Revival's Vietnam-era songs "Who'll Stop the Rain" and "Run Through the Jungle" (both 1970), which the author Peter Ames Carlin said "drew out the social commentary" already present in "Thunder Road" (1975), "The Promised Land", and "Badlands" (both 1978).

In late August 1981, Springsteen and the E Street Band performed a benefit show for the Vietnam Veterans of America (VVA). The event was a major success for the VVA, which was running out of funds at the time, and, according to Carlin, was a "significant step for the Vietnam vets movement in general". Co-founder Bobby Muller later said, "Without Bruce Springsteen, there would be no Vietnam veterans movement."

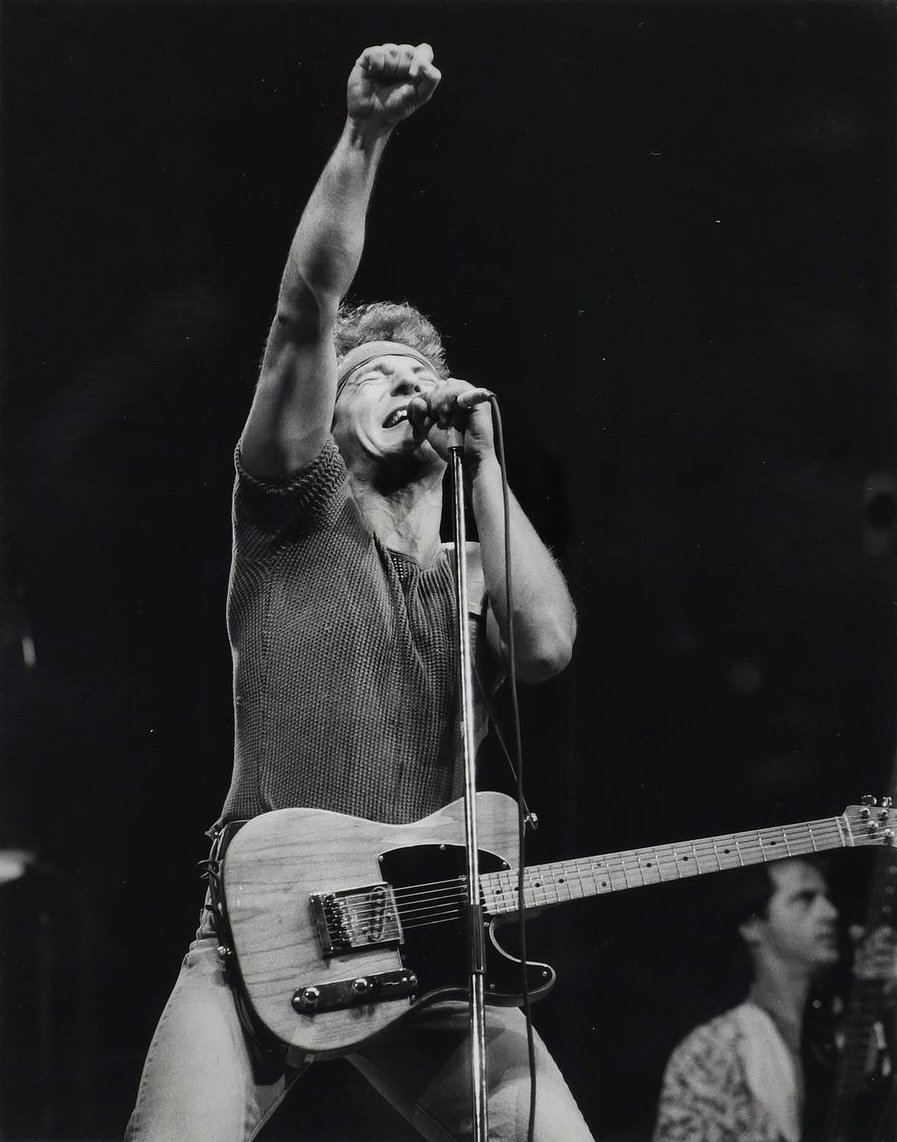
Springsteen performing on the Born in the U.S.A. Tour in 1985.

Springsteen's political impact became much more prominent during the Born in the U.S.A. Tour. The conservative political commentator George Will attended the show in Largo, Maryland, on August 25. The following month, Will published a column in The Washington Post about Springsteen, wherein he praised the performer's work ethic and discussed his "presumed patriotism" with the usage of the phrase "born in the U.S.A." The song "Born in the U.S.A." concerned the mistreatment of Vietnam veterans upon their return home after the war. Its message is widely regarded as misunderstood, as many Americans, including president Reagan, interpreted it as a patriotic anthem.

Less than a week after the column's publishing, Reagan, in the middle of his reelection campaign, praised Springsteen's "patriotism" during a campaign rally in Hammonton, New Jersey, telling the audience: "America's future rests in a thousand dreams inside your hearts. It rests in the message of hope in the songs of a man so many young Americans admire—New Jersey's own, Bruce Springsteen." Springsteen responded dismissively to Reagan's comments two days later during a show in Pittsburgh: "Well, the president was mentioning my name in his speech the other day, and I kind of got to wondering what his favorite album of mine must've been, you know? I don't think it was the Nebraska album. I don't think he's been listening to this one." He then performed "Johnny 99" from the Nebraska album, a song about a narrator who loses his job at the Ford assembly plant in Mahwah, New Jersey, following its closure. According to Marc Dolan, it was one of the first times Springsteen directly acknowledged his songs' political roots onstage.

Beginning with the Born in the U.S.A. Tour, Springsteen has donated to local food banks and other poverty-focused causes on every subsequent tour; he dedicated "My Hometown" (1984) to them during the aforementioned tour.

== Later support and activism ==
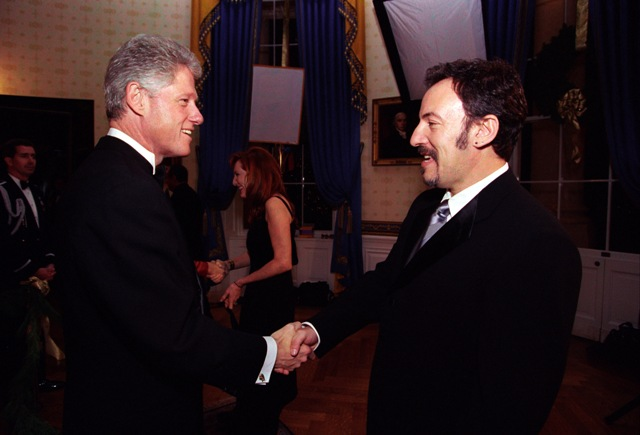
U.S. President Bill Clinton with Springsteen in December 1997

Springsteen became a larger political advocate in the 1990s. In 1990, he appeared at fundraisers for the Christic Institute. After relocating to California, he opposed anti-immigration initiatives, including the 1994 California Proposition 187. In 2000, Springsteen debuted the song "American Skin (41 Shots)", which was inspired by the killing of Amadou Diallo by four NYPD police officers. With the song, Carlin writes that for the first time in his career, besides "Roulette", Springsteen addressed a specific event and controversy directly rather than embodying a message through character studies. Springsteen denied the song was "anti-police". Nevertheless, he received denouncements from Patrick Lynch, then-president of the NYPD's police union, then-New York City mayor Rudy Giuliani and then-New York City Police Commissioner Howard Safir, and Bob Lucente, then-leader of the National Fraternal Order of Police's New York chapter. Later on, the title track of Springsteen's 2005 album Devils & Dust investigated the brutalities of the Iraq War through a soldier's eyes.

He endorsed a political candidate for the first time in 2004 with John Kerry, who adopted "No Surrender" as his campaign song. In April 2008, Springsteen announced his endorsement of Barack Obama's presidential campaign, appearing at several rallies supporting him throughout that year. At one rally in Ohio, Springsteen discussed the importance of "truth, transparency and integrity in government, the right of every American to have a job, a living wage, to be educated in a decent school, and a life filled with the dignity of work, the promise and the sanctity of home". Springsteen has subsequently endorsed every Democratic candidate since, including Obama again in 2012, Hillary Clinton in 2016, Joe Biden in 2020, and Kamala Harris in 2024. For Biden's 2020 presidential campaign, Springsteen provided narration for a campaign ad spotlighting Biden's upbringing in Scranton, Pennsylvania, with "My Hometown" (1984) playing throughout the ad. Biden used "We Take Care of Our Own" (2012) as one of his theme songs, as Obama had before him in 2012. "The Rising" (2002) was featured prominently in the 2020 Democratic National Convention in support of Joe Biden, accompanied with a new video and campaign slogan, #TheRising.

Springsteen supports LGBTQ rights and gay marriage. With his 1994 single "Streets of Philadelphia", Springsteen became the first heterosexual rock star to address the inner feelings of a gay person. In 2009, he posted the following statement on his website: "I've long believed in and have always spoken out for the rights of same sex couples and fully agree with Governor Corzine when he writes that 'The marriage-equality issue should be recognized for what it truly is—a civil rights issue that must be approved to assure that every citizen is treated equally under the law.'" In 2012, he lent his support to the Four 2012, an ad campaign for gay marriage. Springsteen noted in the ad, "I couldn't agree more with that statement and urge those who support equal treatment for our gay and lesbian brothers and sisters to let their voices be heard now." In April 2016, Springsteen cancelled a show in Greensboro, North Carolina, days before it was to take place to protest the state's newly passed Public Facilities Privacy & Security Act, also referred to as the "bathroom law", which dictates which restrooms transgender people are permitted to use and prevents LGBTQ citizens from suing over human rights violations in the workplace. Springsteen released a statement on his website. The Human Rights Campaign celebrated Springsteen's statement, and he has received praise and gratitude from the LGBTQ community.

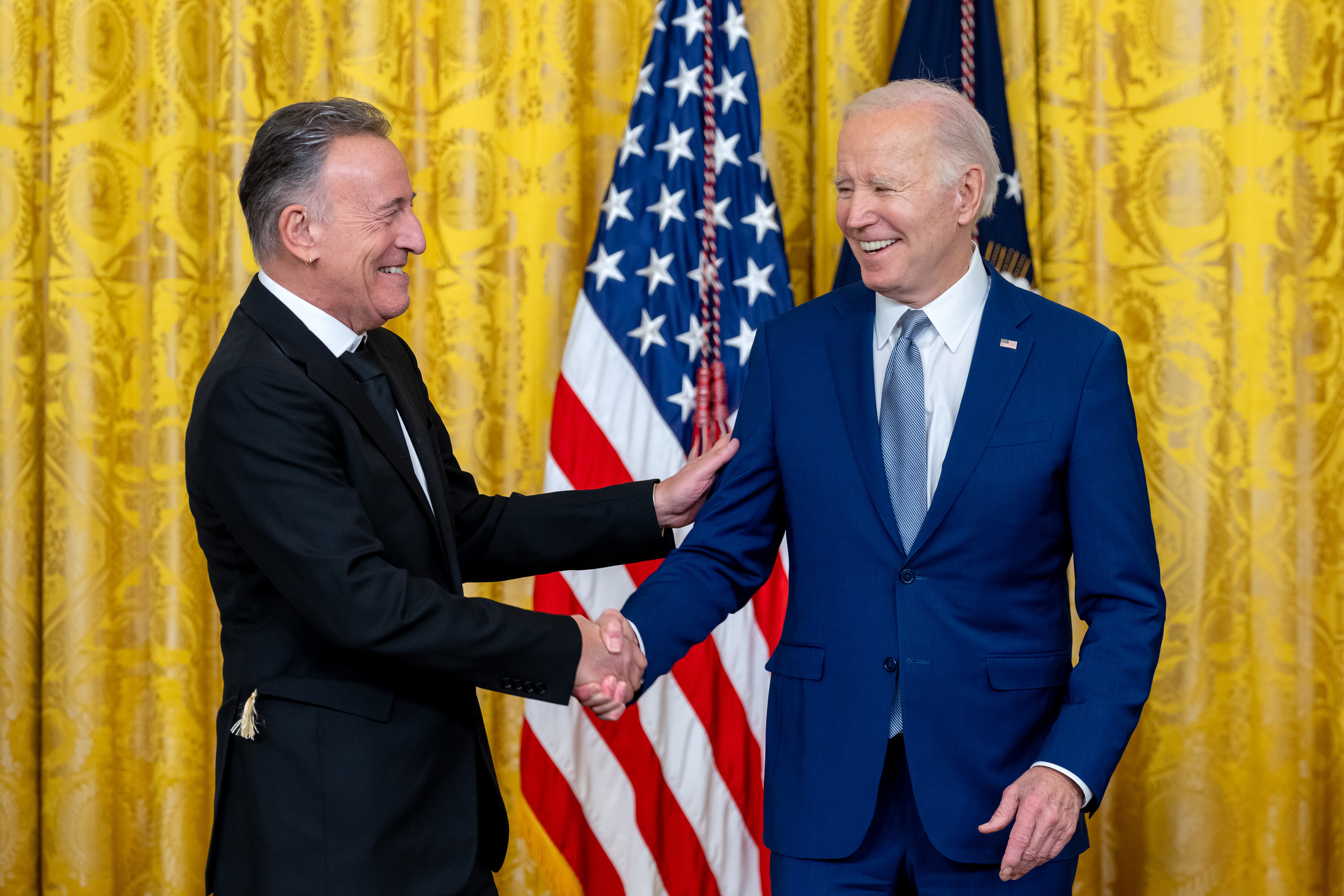
Springsteen with U.S. President Joe Biden in the East Room at the White House in March 2023

During a 2017 show in Perth, Australia, Springsteen made a statement celebrating the post-inauguration Women's March against the incoming Trump administration in cities worldwide: "We're a long way from home, and our hearts and spirits are with the hundreds of thousands of women and men that marched yesterday in every city in America, and in Melbourne ... [They] rallied against hate and division and in support of tolerance, inclusion, reproductive rights, civil rights, racial justice, LGBTQ rights, the environment, wage equality, gender equality, healthcare, and immigrant rights. We stand with you. We are the new American resistance."

Discussing Springsteen's political views overall in a 2009 paper titled "Springsteen's Right Side: A Liberal Icon's Conservatism", Christopher Borick and David Rosenwasser wrote: "He does not attempt to hide his politics. He's got a Democratic ideology, a Republican vocabulary, and a Populist delivery system."

On November 2, 2026, in a rare endorsement for a non-presidential candidate, Springsteen publicly endorsed Abdul El-Sayed, the Democratic nominee in the 2026 United States Senate election in Michigan. He stated on social media: "Dr. El-Sayed is a fighter for our American Constitution, he's a fighter for our American Democracy, and he's a fighter against the corrupt, lawless, and anti-American leadership currently in the White House."

== Stances against Donald Trump ==
Springsteen is a staunch critic of Donald Trump, whom he calls the "conman from Queens". During Trump's first term as president of the United States in October 2019, Springsteen said Trump "doesn't have a grasp of the deep meaning of what it means to be an American", and in June 2020 called him a "threat to our democracy". On October 13, 2020, author Don Winslow released a video critical of Trump prior to his campaign event in Pennsylvania. The video features Springsteen's song "Streets of Philadelphia" (1994).

During a show in Manchester, England, on May 14, 2025, Springsteen spoke out against Trump and called his administration "corrupt, incompetent, and treasonous". Two days later, Trump responded on Truth Social by calling Springsteen "highly overrated" and "dumb as a rock". Tino Gagliardi, the president of the American Federation of Musicians defended Springsteen, saying, "Musicians have the right to freedom of expression, and we stand in solidarity with all our members." On May 19, Trump called for a major investigation into Springsteen, Beyoncé, Oprah, and other celebrities for their endorsement of Harris. He claims that Harris illegally paid them to support her 2024 presidential campaign. Musicians such as Neil Young and Eddie Vedder spoke out in defense of Springsteen saying his freedom of speech rights were being violated. Springsteen included recordings of his Manchester remarks as part of a live EP release, Land of Hope and Dreams.

On January 17, 2026, performing at the Light of Day Winterfest in New Jersey, Springsteen dedicated the song "The Promised Land" to Renée Good, who was killed by an Immigration and Customs Enforcement (ICE) officer in Minnesota that month. The killing occurred within the context of Operation Metro Surge, which involved a significant increase in ICE activity across Minnesota. At the concert, Springsteen said: "If you believe in the power of law and that no one stands above it, if you stand against heavily-armed masked federal troops invading an American city, using gestapo tactics against our fellow citizens, if you believe you don't deserve to be murdered for exercising your American right to protest, then send a message to this president, as the mayor of the city (Jacob Frey) said: ICE should get the fuck out of Minneapolis."

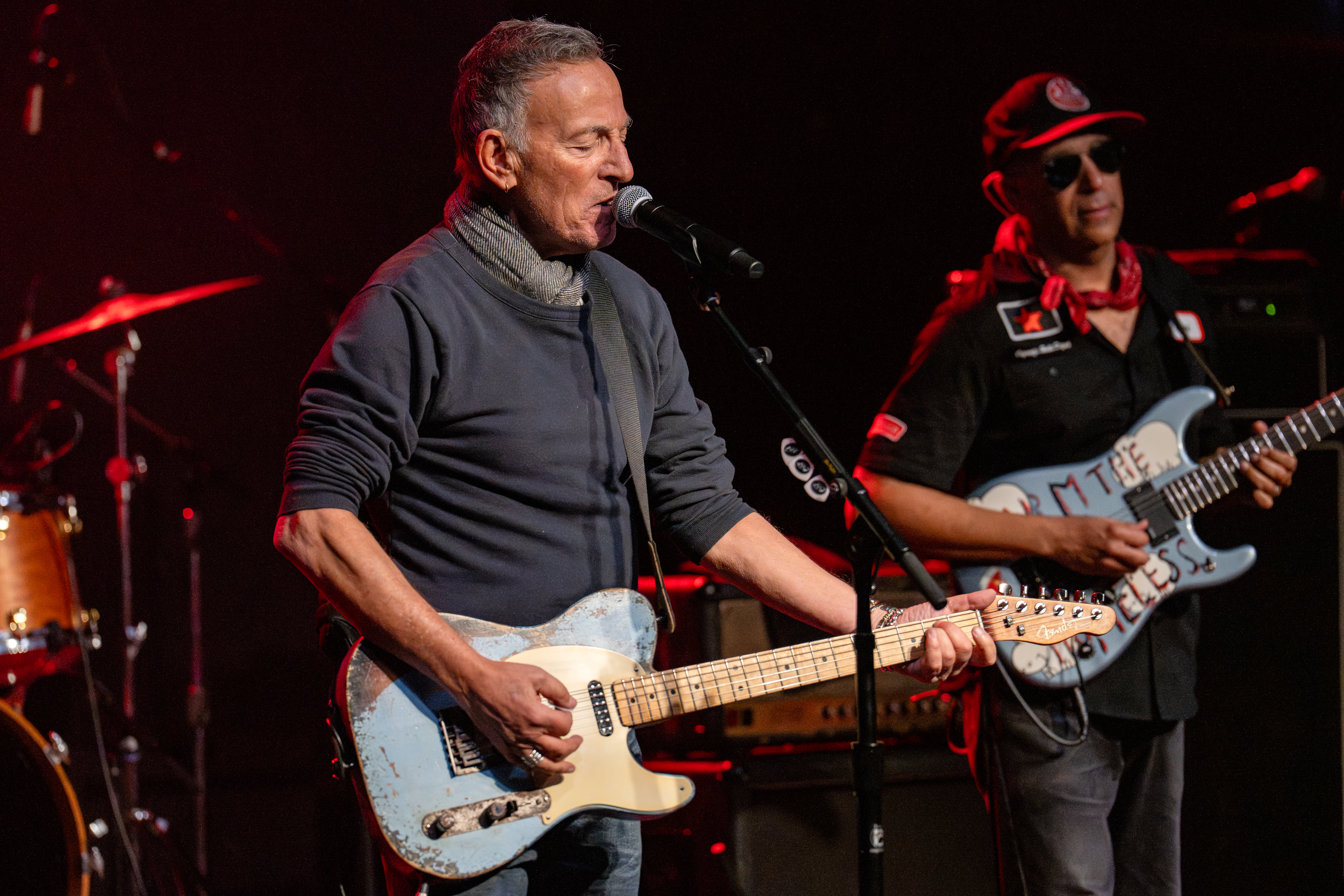
Springsteen performs with Tom Morello at First Avenue in Minneapolis at the "Defend Minnesota" benefit concert, January 2026

On January 28, 2026, Springsteen released the song "Streets of Minneapolis", a protest song written in response to the deaths of Renée Good and Alex Pretti by ICE agents. Springsteen wrote it the day after the shooting of Pretti and released it five days later. On January 30, Springsteen made a surprise guest appearance at Tom Morello's "Defend Minnesota" benefit concert in Minneapolis, where he performed "Streets of Minneapolis" for the first time along with a performance of "The Ghost of Tom Joad" (1995), joined by Morello. 100% of the proceeds from the concert went to the families of Good and Pretti.

Springsteen's 2026 Land of Hope and Dreams American Tour, which he said was in response to Trump, is one of the most overtly political tours of Springsteen's career, both in the setlists and monologues. Springsteen said at a show in his native New Jersey: "We are no longer the land of the free, the home of the brave." He has repeatedly said during numerous shows: "To many we are now America the reckless, unpredictable, predatory rogue nation. That is this administration and this president’s legacy." In response, Trump has attacked Springsteen on Truth Social, calling him a "bad, and very boring singer" and asking his supporters to "boycott his overpriced concert" tickets. The American Federation of Musicians defended Springsteen's right to freedom of speech, saying, "Bruce Springsteen is not just a brilliant musician, he is a voice for working people, a symbol of American resilience, and an inspiration to millions in this country and around the world. From Nebraska to Born to Run, his music has spoken truth to power for decades, and that is exactly what he is doing now." Despite his outspoken views against Trump, Springsteen denounced political violence against him at a show in Austin, Texas, on April 26, 2026, following an attempted assassination on Trump, stating, "We can be critical of those in power, and we can peacefully fight for our beliefs, but there is no place in any way, shape or form for political violence of any kind in our beloved United States."

On March 23, 2026, Springsteen allowed his song "Born in the U.S.A." to be used in a one-minute ad in support of the ACLU in the name of birthright citizenship. "We're honored that the one and only Bruce Springsteen trusted us with use of his iconic anthem ahead of our landmark Supreme Court case Trump v. Barbara, where we're challenging President Trump's attempt to take away the constitutional right to birthright citizenship" the ACLU said in the video. The ad will air during MLB opening day games, Survivor and American Idol among other programming.

Springsteen made a surprise appearance at the Democracy Now! 30th anniversary event in New York City at the Riverside Church on March 23, 2026, where he performed "Streets of Minneapolis" and joined Patti Smith, Michael Stipe, and others for a cover of Smith's "People Have the Power".

Springsteen made a special appearance on the May 20, 2026, penultimate episode of The Late Show with Stephen Colbert, where he performed "Streets of Minneapolis". Before the performance, Springsteen criticized both Trump and the CEOs of Paramount Skydance, which owns CBS: "I am here tonight to support Stephen, because you're the first guy in America who lost his show because we've got a president who can't take a joke. And because Larry and David Ellison feel the need to kiss his ass to get what they want. Stephen, these are small-minded people. They've got no idea what the freedoms of this beautiful country are supposed to be about", Springsteen said.
