= Danny Ray (singer) =

- Born: 3 September 1951 (age 74); Kingston, Jamaica
- Genres: Reggae, lovers rock
- Years active: Late 1960s–present
- Labels: Trojan Records, Polydor Mercury, Golden Age, Doctor, Arista / Black Jack, Jet Star
- Formerly of: Danny Ray and the Vibrations; Danny Ray and the Falcons

Danny Ray (born 3 September 1951) is a Jamaican-born reggae singer and record producer who has been based in the United Kingdom since the late 1960s. He recorded for MCA Records and Trojan Records in the early 1970s and later set up his own Black Jack label.

== Biography ==
Born in Kingston, Ray began his career in Jamaican talent shows in the early 1960s, Jackie Edwards being an early influence. He relocated to the UK in 1965 and joined the Royal Air Force. While posted in Germany he formed the Danny Ray and the Vibrations, the band appearing on television and radio in Europe. After leaving the Air Force and a spell in Jamaica, he returned to the UK and formed Danny Ray and the Falcons, the group recording the single "The Scorpion" for MCA Records. He moved on to Trojan Records who released several successful singles including "Don't Stop", "Sister Big Stuff", "Playboy", and "Your Eyes are Dreaming", with his debut album, The Same One, released in 1973.

In 1974 he starred in the BFI-financed film Moon Over the Alley along with Sharon Forrester. In 1976 he set up the Harlesden-based Golden Age label with Sydney Crooks of The Pioneers, label subsidiaries including Pioneer and Doctor, the latter from Ray's initials.

Ray had further success with singles such as "Dip and Fall Back", "Revolution Rock", and cover versions of Bob Marley's "Waiting in Vain" and "Rastaman Live Up".

Ray set up his own Black Jack label in the late 1970s, producing and releasing his own recordings as well as records by Christine Joy White, Album Pure Love, Dave Barker ("The Glow of Love") and Winston Francis ("California Dreaming"). The B-side of his 1979 single "Rastaman Live Up", "Revolution Rock", was covered by British punk rock band, The Clash on their London Calling album. His duet with Shirley James, "Why Don't You Spend the Night", was sufficiently successful that Arista Records offered him a record deal, reissuing the single and its follow-up, "Right Time of the Night". An album followed featuring both singles.

Recording alongside Dennis Brown and Aswad, Ray was one of the artists who contributed to the British Reggae Artists Famine Appeal charity single, the vocal and dub Discomix "Let's Make Africa Green Again", released in 1986. Amongst the many other artists contributing to the project were Michael "Bammie" Rose, Eddie "Tan Tan" Thornton and B. B. Seaton.

Danny Ray's third album, All the Best, was released in 1989. He has continued to work as a producer, working with the Jet Star label and artists such as J.C. Lodge and Luciano.

== Discography ==
=== Albums ===
- The Same One (1973), Trojan
- All the Best (198?), Black Jack
- Why Don't You Spend the Night (1981), Black Jack – Danny Ray featuring Shirley James
- Playboy (198?), Black Jack
- Classic Lovers (2005), Black Jack – Danny Ray and Friends

=== Singles ===
- "Feel so Bad" (1972), Horse
- "White And Wonderful, Black And Beautiful" (1972), Horse
- "I'm Gonna Get Married" (1973), Trojan
- "White And Wonderful, Black And Beautiful" (1973), Horse
- "Ain't It A Beautiful Morning" (1974), Trojan
- "Morning Side of the Mountain" (1974), Trojan
- "Jane Ann" (1975), Talent
- "Easy Loving" (1975), Doctor – with Pat Dillon
- "I Can't Get Used to Losing You" (1976), Trojan
- "Fire Redder Than Red" (1976), Love
- "Waiting in Vain" (1977), Golden Age
- "Playboy" (1977), Trojan
- "World Festivity" (1977), Doctor
- "Just Like a River" (1978), Horse
- "Back in My Arms" (1978), Black Jack
- "Rastaman Live Up"/"Revolution Rock" (1979), Black Jack/Philips
- "If You Wanna Be Happy" (1980), Jackal
- "Playboy (Rapping)" (1980), Black Jack
- "Let Me Love You" (1981), Black Jack
- "Why Don't You Spend The Night" (1981), Black Jack – with Shirley James
- "Right Time of the Night" (1981), Black Jack – with Shirley James
- "Hey! Paula" (1982), Black Jack – with Shirley James
- "Spring Again" (1982), Black Jack
- "Play Boy" (1986), Black Jack
- "Hard Knock Life" (198?), Black Jack
- "Jamaica I Hear You Calling" (198?), Black Jack
- "He'll Break Your Heart", Boomerang – with Balance
- "Kingston Town", Black Jack
- "No Love Today", Black Jack
- "Working Couple", Black Jack
- "If You Wanna Be Happy", Jet Star
- "Enjoy Yourself (It's Later than You Think)" (2011), Black Jack
