= Ray Lowry =

English cartoonist, illustrator and satirist (1944-2008)

- Born: 28 August 1944; Cadishead, Salford, England
- Died: 14 October 2008; Waterfoot, Lancashire, England
- Known for: Cartoonist; illustrator; satirist

Ray Lowry (28 August 1944 – 14 October 2008) was an English cartoonist, illustrator and satirist, possessing a highly distinctive style and wit. He contributed to The Guardian, Private Eye, Punch, Tatler and NME, among many other publications. In his later years he lived in Rossendale, Lancashire.

== Life and work ==
Lowry was born the son of a bricklayer in Cadishead, Salford, and attended Urmston Grammar School. He worked in Manchester and London, and, although he had no formal art education, he became known as a cartoonist during the 1970s. It was less well known that he was also a painter of urban landscapes, following in the footsteps of his unrelated namesake L. S. Lowry.

Ray Lowry drew cartoons for a wide range of publications. With the emergence of the underground press in the 1960s his work was published in Oz and International Times, which led to a long and better-paid relationship with the New Musical Express (better known as NME), including a weekly cartoon strip, "Only Rock'n'Roll". Lowry's love of raw rock and roll was the perfect complement to the new punk mentality that emerged in the late 1970s. He saw the Sex Pistols at the Electric Circus in Manchester, on their Anarchy tour, and there met the Clash. He struck up a friendship with the members of the Clash, which led to an invitation to accompany them on their tour of the United States in 1979. From this he created the artwork for the sleeve of their album London Calling, using a photograph by Pennie Smith.

During the 1980s Lowry wrote a column in The Face and was a regular contributor to The Guardian. He remained obsessed with rock and roll. Near the end of his life, he produced a long series of colour images inspired by the tour of the UK by the American rockers Eddie Cochran and Gene Vincent.

Lowry eventually moved to Rossendale in Lancashire. Although he no longer worked for periodicals, he never stopped painting and drawing. Near the end of his life he was taken up by the See Gallery in Crawshawbooth, Rossendale. An exhibition at the See in 2008 proved very successful and he began to plan new schemes, including paintings inspired by the novel Under the Volcano, by another unrelated namesake, Malcolm Lowry.

After years of ill health, Ray Lowry died suddenly at the age of 64. He was found at his home in Waterfoot, Lancashire, on the morning of 14 October 2008.

== The Ray Lowry Foundation ==
The Ray Lowry Foundation was set up in 2009 by Lowry's son, Sam, and Julian Williams and Jackie Taylor of the See Gallery. The aim of the Foundation is to ensure that his work will be remembered and appreciated, and to create a fund in his name that will provide financial assistance and mentorship to individuals and art projects. This will include providing a scholarship to a student studying a course in art for a higher degree and making financial awards linked to individual art projects.

The Foundation has helped with placing Lowry's work as part of an exhibition about Malcolm Lowry at the BlueCoat Gallery, Liverpool, and a major public exhibition of Ray Lowry's own work at the Salford Gallery and Museum in December 2009. A major exhibition was planned for Leeds in 2010.

A retrospective of Ray Lowry's work was held at the Idea Generation Gallery, London, from 18 June to 4 July 2010, in aid of The Ray Lowry Foundation. As part of the exhibition Tracey Emin, Nick Hornby, Billy Childish, Harry Hill, Paul Simonon, Humphrey Ocean and 23 others contributed works and many produced reinterpretations of Ray Lowry's sleeve for London Calling (see above) in aid of the Foundation.

After several years, work on the Ray Lowry Foundation project came to a halt due to personal issues and Sam's near fatal battle with alcoholism. All things regarding Ray's work were somewhat stalled until 2021.

== Selected bibliography ==
Collections of his work

- Only Rock 'n' Roll 1980 ISBN 0-86104-320-0
- This Space to Let 1986 ISBN 0-349-12208-3
- Ink 1998 ISBN 1-899344-21-7

As an illustrator

- The Penguin Book of Rock and Roll Writing 1992 ISBN 0-14-016836-2
- Rock Talk 1994 ISBN 1-899344-00-4
- Funny Talk 1995 ISBN 1-899344-01-2
- A Riot of our Own: Night and Day with The "Clash" 1997 ISBN 0-575-40080-3
