= Land of Hope and Dreams American Tour =

2026 concert tour by Bruce Springsteen and the E Street Band

- Tour by Bruce Springsteen and the E Street Band
- Location: North America
- Start date: March 31, 2026
- End date: May 30, 2026
- No. of shows: 20

Bruce Springsteen concert chronology
- Springsteen and E Street Band 2023–2025 Tour (2023–2025); Land of Hope and Dreams American Tour (2026)

The Land of Hope and Dreams American Tour was a North American concert tour by American singer Bruce Springsteen and his backing band the E Street Band along with guest musician Tom Morello. The 20-date tour began on March 31, 2026, in Minneapolis, Minnesota, and concluded on May 30, 2026, in Philadelphia, Pennsylvania.

== Background ==
Confirmation of the tour was made by Springsteen in a video announcement on February 17, 2026. The tour, with the slogan of "No Kings", is in response to President Donald Trump. In the video announcement for the tour, Springsteen said "We are living through dark, disturbing and dangerous times, but do not despair—the cavalry is coming! ... We will be rocking your town in celebration and in defense of America—American democracy, American freedom, our American Constitution and our sacred American dream—all of which are under attack by our wannabe king and his rogue government in Washington, D.C. Everyone, regardless of where you stand or what you believe in, is welcome—so come on out and join the United Free Republic of E Street Nation for an American spring of Rock 'n' Rebellion! I’ll see you there!"

Private rehearsals for the tour were held on March 19–24 in Ocean Grove, New Jersey, at the Ocean Grove Youth Temple. Patti Scialfa and Tom Morello were both absent from rehearsals. Morello, however, joined the tour when it began, while Scialfa did not. Rehearsals included Springsteen's 2026 song "Streets of Minneapolis"; "Across the Border", a song from 1995's The Ghost of Tom Joad album; and a cover of "War", which was last performed in 2003. A tour promotional video, with photos and video by Springsteen's sister Pamela Springsteen, was released on March 23. Another video featuring the entire band was released on March 25. "We are bringing hope over fear, democracy over authoritarianism, the rule of law over lawlessness, ethics over unbridled corruption, unity over division, and peace over war!" Springsteen says in the video, which ends with the band performing the first notes of Edwin Starr's "War".

== White House response and reaction ==
White House Communications Director Steven Cheung issued a response to the tour on February 18, 2026, through Politico by using Springsteen's own song titles as a means to insult him. Cheung said, "When this loser Springsteen comes back home to his own 'City of Ruins' in his head, he’ll realize his 'Glory Days' are behind him and his fans have left him 'Out in the Street', putting him in a 'Tenth Avenue Freeze-Out' because he has a severe case of Trump Derangement Syndrome that has rotted his brain.”

On April 2, 2026, two days following the first show of the tour, President Trump took to Truth Social and heavily criticized Springsteen and urged his supporters to boycott him by saying, "Bad, and very boring singer, Bruce Springsteen, who looks like a dried up prune who has suffered greatly from the work of a really bad plastic surgeon, has long had a horrible and incurable case of Trump Derangement Syndrome, sometimes referred to as TDS. The guy is a total loser who spews hate against a President who won a Landslide Election, including the popular vote, all Seven Swing States, and 86% of the Counties across America. Under Sleepy Joe and the Dems, our Country was DEAD, and now we have the 'hottest' Country, by far, anywhere in the World. MAGA SHOULD BOYCOTT HIS OVERPRICED CONCERTS, WHICH SUCK. SAVE YOUR HARD EARNED MONEY. AMERICA IS BACK!!! President DJT."

In response to President Trump's comments, the musicians' union, American Federation of Musicians, defended Springsteen's right to freedom of speech, saying they could “not remain silent as one of our most celebrated members is singled out and personally attacked by the President of the United States" and added, "Bruce Springsteen is not just a brilliant musician, he is a voice for working people, a symbol of American resilience, and an inspiration to millions in this country and around the world. From Nebraska to Born to Run, his music has spoken truth to power for decades, and that is exactly what he is doing now.”

At least one media report criticized Springsteen for profiting from anti-Trump sentiment while portraying himself as a populist artist. "One problem: It’s all hypocritical crap," the article stated. "Profiteering over legitimate protest. Springsteen's artistic identity, as a bleeding-heart populist who sings for the destitute and downtrodden, has never been more disconnected from his economic behavior as a touring act or businessman. The blue-collar troubadour now charges exorbitant amounts for his tickets—up to $2,900 retail for the best seats in Newark Monday; prices he agreed to despite fan backlash. He’s selling 'No Kings' branded flags for $90 in the arena concourse."

On April 26, 2026, one day following an attempted assassination on Donald Trump at the White House Correspondents' Dinner, Springsteen set aside his differences with Trump during a show in Austin, Texas. He said, "We begin tonight with a prayer for our men and women in service overseas, we pray for their safe return. We also send out a prayer of thanks that our President, nor anyone in the administration, nor anyone attending, was injured at last night’s incident at the [White House] Press Correspondents’ Dinner. We can disagree. We can be critical of those in power, and we can peacefully fight for our beliefs. But there is no place in any way, shape, or form for political violence of any kind in our beloved United States.”

Guitarist Steven Van Zandt said in a May 2026 interview with The Daily Mail that due to the political theme of the tour and statements made by Springsteen, the tour was forced to beef up security due to backlash and increased death threats, even saying the FBI paid close attention to the threats. "It's a very specific political theme to this tour and there's been a lot of threats, death threats. Usually there's always some, but this time it's been increasing. The band, Bruce, we've had to beef up security and, you know, it's mostly just talk. And it's not like we're saying something that's not true or we're saying something that's so really particularly controversial, but it's specifically political. So the FBI and others have been really watching things and been overly concerned about it, as they should be. We want the fans to be safe and feel safe. So we really go the extra mile with extra security for that reason alone."

During the tour, Springsteen frequently mentioned the actions of Elon Musk without using his name. Springsteen said, "The richest men in America have abandoned the world’s poorest children to death and disease by dismantling USAID. It's not on the front pages anymore but it's happening now. People are dying." On May 26, 2026, Musk responded on social media, saying, "Springsteen is (ironically) an America-hating idiot and billionaire hypocrite complaining about the 'evil' rich man Elon Musk 'killing' the poorest children in the world because fraud at USAID was ended." He also criticized Springsteen's use of a teleprompter during his shows, saying, "I wonder who wrote it for him. He’s just a puppet."

== Set list ==
This set list reflects the tour's closing night in Philadelphia on May 30, 2026, and is representative of the majority of the performances throughout the tour. The setlist was largely static throughout the duration of the tour, in contrast to many of Springsteen's previous ones.

1. "War" (with Tom Morello)
2. "Born in the U.S.A." (with Tom Morello)
3. "Death to My Hometown" (with Tom Morello)
4. "Clampdown" (with Tom Morello)
5. "No Surrender"
6. "Darkness on the Edge of Town"
7. "Streets of Minneapolis"
8. "The Promised Land"
9. "Two Hearts"
10. "Hungry Heart"
11. "Youngstown"
12. "Murder Incorporated"
13. "American Skin (41 Shots)" (with Tom Morello)
14. "Long Walk Home" (with Tom Morello)
15. "House of a Thousand Guitars" (Springsteen solo acoustic)
16. "My City of Ruins"
17. "Because the Night"
18. "Wrecking Ball"
19. "The Rising"
20. "The Ghost of Tom Joad" (with Tom Morello on co-lead vocals)
21. "Badlands" (with Tom Morello)
22. "Land of Hope and Dreams"/"People Get Ready" (with Tom Morello)
  Encore
23. "American Land" (with Tom Morello)
24. "Born to Run"
25. "Dancing in the Dark"
26. "Tenth Avenue Freeze-Out" (with Tom Morello)
27. "Chimes of Freedom" (with Tom Morello)

== Tour dates ==
List of 2026 concerts, showing date, city, country, and venue
Date (2026)	City	Country	Venue	Attendance	Revenue
March 31	Minneapolis	United States	Target Center	17,195 / 17,195	$22,700,000
April 3	Portland	United States	Moda Center	17,895 / 17,895	$22,700,000
April 7	Inglewood	United States	Kia Forum	31,043 / 31,043	$22,700,000
April 9	Inglewood	United States	Kia Forum	31,043 / 31,043	$22,700,000
April 13	San Francisco	United States	Chase Center	16,443 / 16,443	$22,700,000
April 16	Phoenix	United States	Mortgage Matchup Center	13,903 / 13,903	$22,700,000
April 20	Newark	United States	Prudential Center	—	—
April 23	Sunrise	United States	Amerant Bank Arena	—	—
April 26	Austin	United States	Moody Center	—	—
April 29	Chicago	United States	United Center	—	—
May 2	Atlanta	United States	State Farm Arena	—	—
May 5	Elmont	United States	UBS Arena	—	—
May 11	New York City	United States	Madison Square Garden	—	—
May 14	Brooklyn	United States	Barclays Center	—	—
May 16	New York City	United States	Madison Square Garden	—	—
May 19	Pittsburgh	United States	PPG Paints Arena	—	—
May 22	Cleveland	United States	Rocket Arena	—	—
May 24	Boston	United States	TD Garden	—	—
May 27	Washington, D.C.	United States	Nationals Park	—	—
May 30	Philadelphia	United States	Xfinity Mobile Arena	—	—
Total				96,479	$22,700,000

== Postponed dates ==
Date	City	Country	Venue	Reason
May 8, 2026	Philadelphia	United States	Xfinity Mobile Arena	Scheduling conflicts with Philadelphia Flyers and Philadelphia 76ers, rescheduled for May 30

== Land of Hope and Dreams (Philadelphia Freedom Cut) ==
On September 9, 2026, Springsteen released the first of a four part concert film titled Bruce Springsteen and the E Street Band: Land of Hope and Dreams (Philadelphia Freedom Cut) to YouTube. The concert was filmed at his May 30, 2026 show in Philadelphia, PA. Springsteen plans to release the entire show in four parts throughout the remainder of 2026 with the second part being released on September 23, Springsteen's 77th birthday. The film was directed by Chris Hilson and Thom Zimny.

== Personnel ==
=== The E Street Band ===
- Bruce Springsteen – lead vocals, electric lead guitar, electric and acoustic rhythm guitars, harmonica
- Garry Tallent – bass guitar, background vocals
- Roy Bittan – piano, synthesizer, accordion
- Max Weinberg – drums
- Steven Van Zandt – rhythm guitar, lead guitar, mandolin, background vocals
- Nils Lofgren – electric and acoustic rhythm guitars, electric lead guitar, pedal steel guitar, background vocals

and

- Soozie Tyrell – violin, acoustic rhythm guitar, percussion, background vocals
- Charles Giordano – organ, accordion, electronic glockenspiel
- Jake Clemons – saxophone, percussion, background vocals

with

- Tom Morello – lead guitar, rhythm guitar, background vocals, co-lead vocals (on "The Ghost of Tom Joad" and "Clampdown") (Select songs at each show)

=== The E Street Horns ===
- Barry Danielian – trumpet, percussion
- Ed Manion – tenor saxophone, baritone saxophone, percussion
- Ozzie Melendez – trombone, percussion
- Curt Ramm – trumpet, percussion
- Dan Levine – trombone, percussion, filled in for Ozzie

=== The E Street Choir ===
- Anthony Almonte – percussion, congas, bongos, backing vocals
- Ada Dyer – backing vocals, percussion
- Curtis King Jr. – backing vocals, percussion
- Lisa Lowell – backing vocals, percussion
- Michelle Moore – backing vocals, percussion
