= London Calling =

Studio album by the Clash
- Released: 14 December 1979
- Recorded: August–November 1979
- Studios: Wessex, London
- Genres: Punk rock; new wave; post-punk; ska punk
- Length: 65:07
- Labels: CBS; Epic
- Producer: Guy Stevens

The Clash chronology
Give 'Em Enough Rope (1978)	London Calling (1979)	Sandinista! (1980)

Singles from London Calling
- 1. "London Calling" Released: 7 December 1979; 2. "Clampdown" Released: 1980 (Australia only); 3. "Train in Vain" Released: 12 February 1980

London Calling is the third studio album by the English rock band the Clash. It was originally released as a double album in the United Kingdom on 14 December 1979 by CBS Records, and in the United States and Canada in January 1980 by Epic Records.

The Clash recorded the album with producer Guy Stevens at Wessex Sound Studios in London over a five- to six-week period starting in August 1979, following a change in management and a period of writer's block for songwriters Joe Strummer and Mick Jones. Bridging a traditional punk rock sound and a new wave aesthetic, London Calling reflects the band's growing interest in styles beyond their punk roots, including reggae, rockabilly, ska, New Orleans R&B, pop, lounge jazz, and hard rock. Lyrical themes include social displacement, unemployment, racial conflict, drug use, and the responsibilities of adulthood.

The album was a top ten chart success in the UK, and its lead single "London Calling" was a top 20 single. The album has sold over five million copies worldwide, and was certified platinum in the US for sales of one million. It was also met with widespread critical acclaim and has retrospectively been named one of the greatest albums of all time. On Rolling Stone's list of the 500 Greatest Albums of All Time, London Calling was ranked number 8 in the 2003 and 2012 editions, and number 16 in the 2020 edition. In 2010, it was one of ten classic album covers from British artists commemorated on a UK postage stamp issued by the Royal Mail.

== Background ==
On their second album Give 'Em Enough Rope (1978), the Clash had started to depart from the punk rock sound. While touring the United States in 1979, they chose supporting acts such as rhythm and blues artists Bo Diddley, Sam & Dave, Lee Dorsey, and Screamin' Jay Hawkins, as well as neotraditional country artist Joe Ely and punk rockabilly band the Cramps. The Clash's growing fascination with rock and roll inspired their direction for London Calling.

After recording Give 'Em Enough Rope, the Clash separated from their manager Bernard Rhodes. This meant they had to leave their rehearsal studio in Camden Town. Tour manager Johnny Green and drum roadie Baker found a new place to rehearse, Vanilla Studios, in the back of a garage in Pimlico.

The Clash arrived at Vanilla in May 1979 with no new songs prepared for their third album. Main songwriters Mick Jones and Joe Strummer had experienced a period of writer's block and had not written a new song in over a year; their recently released Cost of Living EP featured a cover song and three other songs that had all been written over a year earlier.

== Rehearsals and The Vanilla Tapes ==
Rehearsals were held in Vanilla Studios over mid-1979. The Clash began playing covers from genres including rockabilly, rock and roll, rhythm and blues, and reggae. In contrast to previous rehearsal sessions, the band kept these rehearsals private, and did not allow hangers-on to attend. This seclusion allowed the band to rebuild their confidence without worrying about the reaction from outsiders, who were familiar with the band's punk rock style.

The band developed an "extremely disciplined" daily routine of afternoon rehearsals, broken by a late-afternoon social football game, which fostered a friendly bond between the band members. The football was followed by drinks at a local pub, followed by a second rehearsal in the evening.

The band gradually rebuilt their confidence, with the styles of the session's early cover songs setting the template for the diverse material that would be written for London Calling. The band were also encouraged by a growing recognition of drummer Topper Headon's skills, which they realised could be used to perform music in a wide array of genres and styles beyond punk rock.

During these rehearsals in the early summer of 1979, a series of demos dubbed The Vanilla Tapes (after the name of the rehearsal studio) were made on a TEAC 4-track recorder. These tapes contain early versions of 15 of the 19 songs that would eventually appear on London Calling, sometimes in very rudimentary forms (several lack the lyrics, musical structure, or titles of their final versions – the instrumental track titled "Paul's Tune" would eventually be recorded for London Calling under the title "The Guns of Brixton", while the instrumental tracked titled "Up-Toon" would ultimately be released as "The Right Profile", for example). They also include covers that did not make the final album, including Sonny Okosun's "Where You Gonna Go (Soweto)" and a reggae version of Bob Dylan's "The Man in Me" (possibly influenced by London-based reggae band Matumbi's 1976 version), as well as never-officially-released Clash tunes like "Heart and Mind" (described by rock journalist Pat Gilbert as "a rocker"), and the country-inflected "Lonesome Me." Notably, they do not include the London Calling tracks "Spanish Bombs", "Wrong 'Em Boyo", "The Card Cheat", or "Train in Vain", suggesting that these tracks were written (or, in "Wrong 'Em Boyo"'s case, selected) later, possibly during the actual album sessions. These tapes, believed lost in 1979 (roadie Johnny Green claimed in his 1999 autobiography A Riot Of Our Own that he had lost them on the London Underground prior to the album's recording), were rediscovered by Mick Jones while he was moving in 2004, and 21 were curated for release on the 25th Anniversary Legacy Edition of London Calling.

== Writing and recording ==
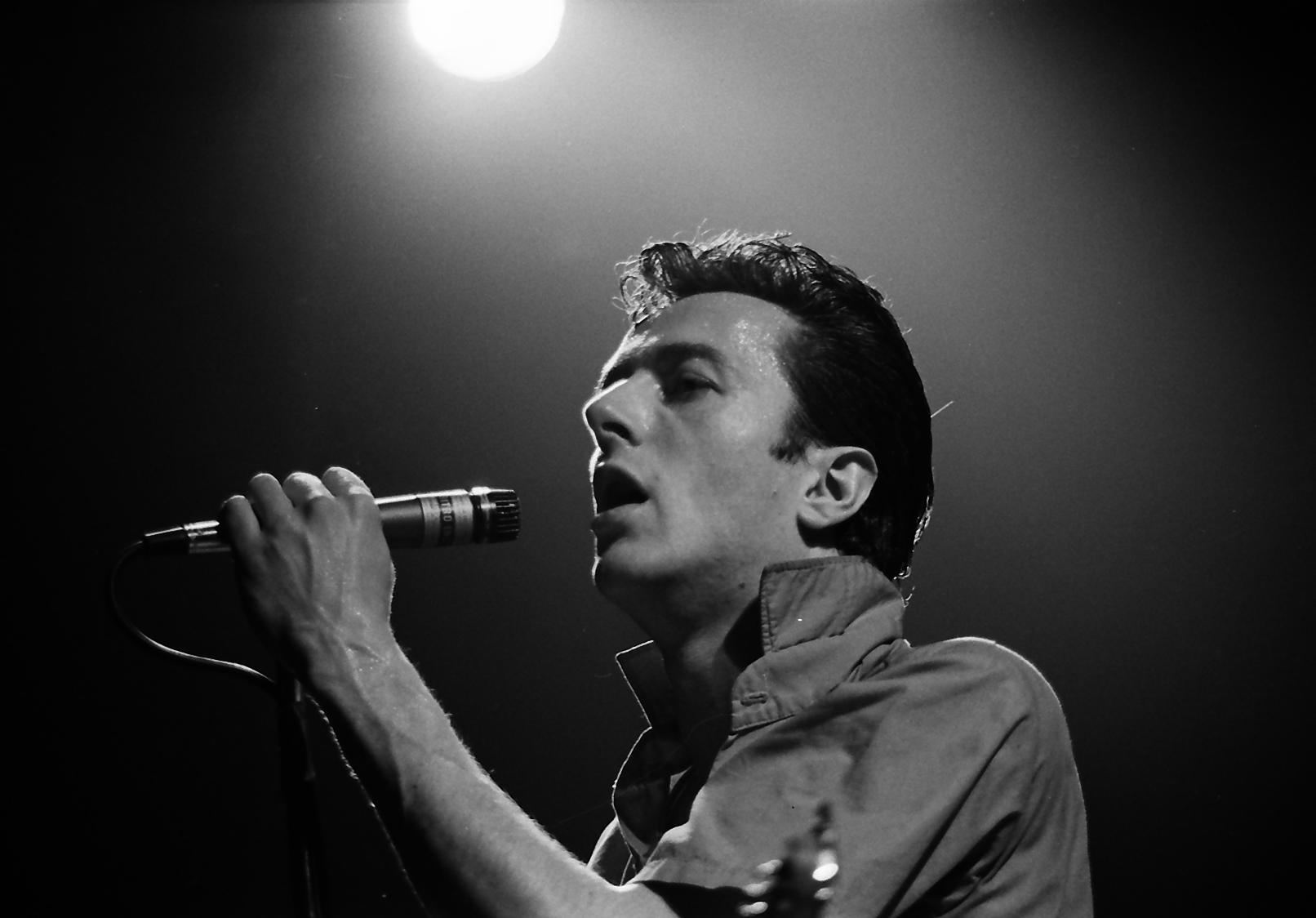

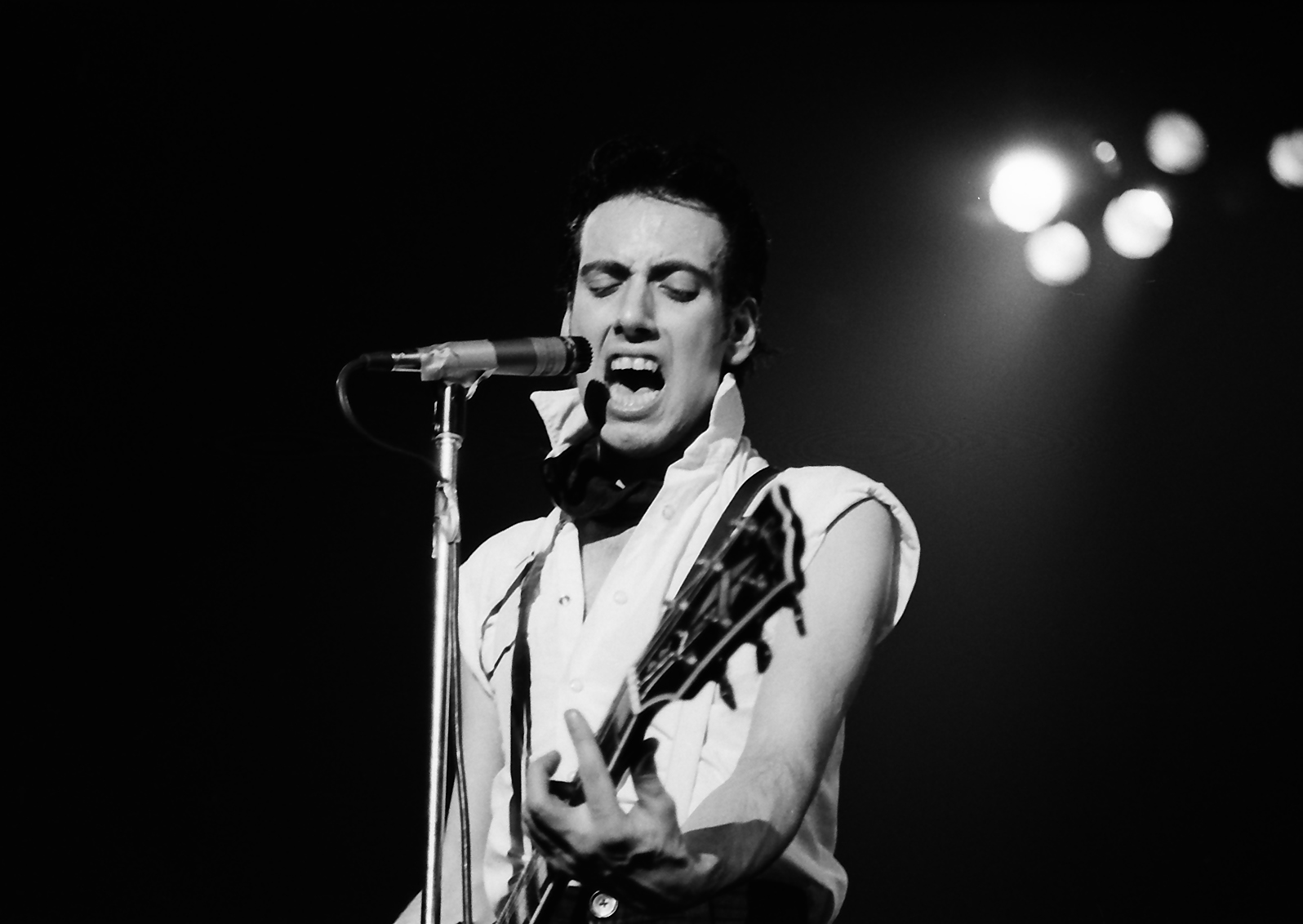
Joe Strummer (top) and Mick Jones (bottom), the band's lead vocalists, guitarists, and lyricists; pictured in 1980

The Clash wrote and recorded demos at Vanilla Studios, with Mick Jones composing and arranging much of the music and Joe Strummer writing most of the lyrics. Strummer wrote "Lost in the Supermarket" after imagining Jones' childhood growing up in a basement with his mother and grandmother. "The Guns of Brixton" was the first of bassist Paul Simonon's compositions the band would record for an album, and the first to have him sing lead. Simonon was originally doubtful about its lyrics, which discuss an individual's paranoid outlook on life, but was encouraged by Strummer to continue working on it.

In August 1979, the band entered Wessex Studios to begin recording London Calling. The Clash asked Guy Stevens to produce the album, much to the dismay of CBS Records. Stevens had alcohol and drug problems and his production methods were unconventional. During a recording session he swung a ladder and upturned chairs – apparently to create a rock & roll atmosphere. During another session, Stevens poured a bottle of wine over a piano that Strummer was playing to either to make it sound better or to simply make him stop. The Clash, especially Simonon, got along well with Stevens, and found Stevens' work to be very helpful and productive to both Simonon's playing and their recording as a band. The album was recorded during a five- to six-week period involving 18-hour days, with many songs recorded in one or two takes.

The first track recorded for London Calling was "Brand New Cadillac", which the Clash had originally used as a warm-up song before recording. "Clampdown" began as an instrumental track called "Working and Waiting". While working on "The Card Cheat", the band recorded each part twice to create a "sound as big as possible".

== Musical style ==
London Calling is regarded by music critic Mark Kidel as the first post-punk double album, as it exhibits a broader range of musical styles than the Clash's previous records. Stephen Thomas Erlewine said the album appropriated the "punk aesthetic into rock & roll mythology and roots music", while incorporating a wider range of styles such as punk, reggae, rockabilly, ska, New Orleans R&B, pop, lounge jazz, and hard rock. "Brand New Cadillac", the album's second track, was written and originally recorded by Vince Taylor and was cited by the Clash as "one of the first British rock'n'roll records". The fifth song, "Rudie Can't Fail" features a horn section and mixes elements of pop, soul, and reggae music together.

The Clash's embrace of specific musical traditions for London Calling deviated from what Greg Kot viewed as punk's iconoclastic sensibilities. Speaking on the album, Jack Sargeant remarked that "whether the Clash completely abandoned their punk roots or pushed punk's musical eclecticism and diversity into new terrain remains a controversial issue." According to rock historian Charles T. Brown, the album led to the band's association with new wave music, while music academic James E. Perone considers the album "new wave rock".

== Themes ==
The album's songs are generally about London, with narratives featuring both fictional and life-based characters, such as an underworld criminal named Jimmy Jazz and a gun-toting Jimmy Cliff aspirant living in Brixton ("The Guns of Brixton"). In the opinion of PopMatters journalist Sal Ciolfi, the songs encompass an arrangement of urban narratives and characters, and touch on themes such as sex, depression and identity crisis. "Rudie Can't Fail" chronicles the life of a fun-loving young man who is criticised for his inability to act like a responsible adult. "Clampdown" comments on people who forsake the open-minded idealism of youth and urges young people to fight the status quo. "The Guns of Brixton" explores an individual's paranoid outlook on life, while on "Death or Glory", Strummer examines his life in retrospect and acknowledges the complications and responsibilities of adulthood. "Lover's Rock" advocates safe sex and planning.

Some songs have more widely contextualised narratives, including references to the "evil presidentes" working for the "clampdown", the lingering effects of the Spanish Civil War ("Spanish Bombs"), and how constant consumerism had led to unavoidable political apathy ("Lost in the Supermarket"). "London Calling", the album's title track and opener, was partially influenced by the March 1979 accident at a nuclear reactor at Three Mile Island in Pennsylvania. It also discusses the problems of rising unemployment, racial conflict and drug use in Great Britain. According to music critic Tom Carson, "while the album draws on the entirety of rock and roll's past for its sound, the concepts and lyrical themes are drawn from the history, politics and myths associated with the genre".

== Artwork ==
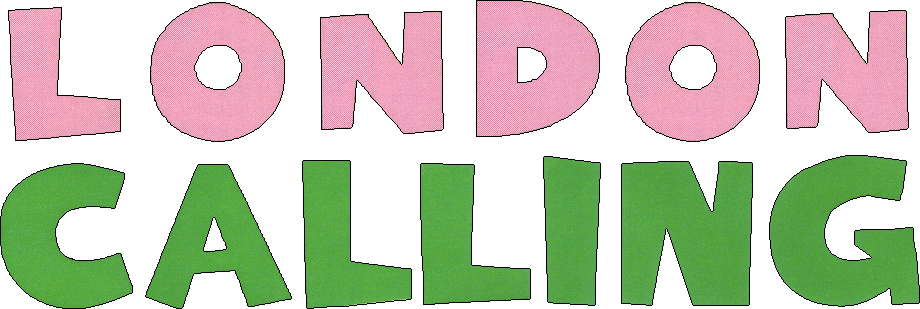
The logotype for the album was modeled after that for Elvis Presley.

The album's iconic front cover features a photograph of bassist Paul Simonon smashing his Fender Precision Bass (now on display at the Museum of London, formerly Cleveland Rock and Roll Hall of Fame) against the stage at the Palladium in New York City on 20 September 1979. Simonon revealed in a 2011 interview with Fender that he smashed the bass out of frustration when he learned that the bouncers at the concert would not allow the audience members to stand up from their seats, explaining: "I wasn't taking it out on the bass guitar, cos there ain't anything wrong with it". Pennie Smith, who photographed the band for the album, originally did not want the photograph to be used. She thought that it was too out of focus, due to her backing away from Simonon as he approached the edge of the stage, but Strummer and graphic designer Ray Lowry thought it would make a good album cover. In 2002, Smith's photograph was named the best rock and roll photograph of all time by Q magazine, commenting that "it captures the ultimate rock'n'roll moment – total loss of control".

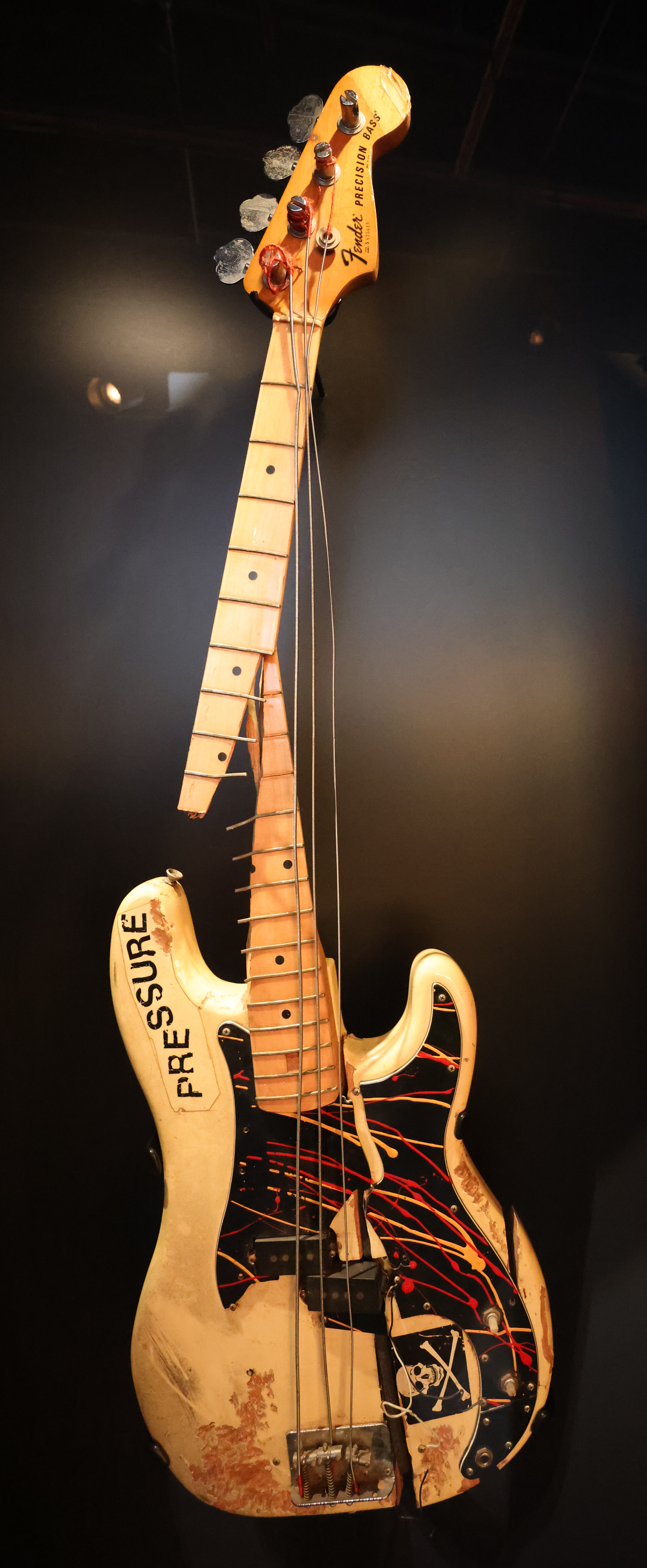
The Fender Precision Bass featured on the cover

The cover artwork was designed by Lowry and was an homage to the design of Elvis Presley's self-titled debut album, with pink letters down the left side and green text across the bottom. The cover was named the ninth best album cover of all time by Q magazine in 2001. In 1995, Big Audio Dynamite (a band fronted by former Clash member Mick Jones) used the same scheme for their F-Punk album. The album cover for London Calling was among the ten chosen by the Royal Mail for a set of "Classic Album Cover" postage stamps issued in January 2010. The cover art was later imitated for the soundtrack to Tony Hawk's American Wasteland.

== Release and promotion ==
The album was released in the United Kingdom on vinyl on 14 December 1979, and in the United States on vinyl and 8-track tape in January 1980. A gatefold cover design of the LP was only released in Japan. Though London Calling was released as a double album it was only sold for about the price of a single album. The Clash's record label, CBS, at first denied the band's request for the album to be released as a double. In return CBS gave permission for the band to include a free 12-inch single that played at 33⅓ rpm. Ultimately, the planned 12-inch record became a second nine-track LP. The final track, "Train in Vain", was originally excluded from the back cover's track listing. It was intended to be given away through a promotion with NME, but was added to the album at the last minute after the deal fell through.

Upon its release, London Calling sold approximately two million copies. The album peaked at number nine in the United Kingdom and was certified gold in December 1979. The album performed strongly outside the United Kingdom. It reached number two in Sweden and number four in Norway. In the United States, London Calling peaked at number 27 on the Billboard Pop Albums chart and was certified platinum in February 1996. The album produced two of the band's most successful singles. "London Calling" preceded the album with a 7 December 1979 release. It peaked at number 11 on the UK Singles Chart. The song's music video, directed by Letts, featured the band performing the song on a boat in the pouring rain with the River Thames behind them. In the United States, "Train in Vain", backed with "London Calling", was released as a single in February 1980. It peaked at number 23 on the Billboard Hot 100 singles chart and "London Calling"/"Train in Vain" peaked at number 30 on the Billboard Disco Top 100 chart.

== Critical reception ==
London Calling was met with widespread critical acclaim. Reviewing the album for The New York Times in 1980, John Rockwell said it finally validates the acclaim received by the Clash up to that point because of how their serious political themes and vital playing were retained in innovative music with a broad appeal. "This is an album that captures all the Clash's primal energy, combines it with a brilliant production job by Guy Stevens and reveals depths of invention and creativity barely suggested by the band's previous work", Rockwell said. Charles Shaar Murray wrote in NME that it was the first record to be on-par with the band's hype, while Melody Maker critic James Truman said the Clash had "discovered themselves" by embracing American music styles. Rolling Stone magazine's Tom Carson claimed the music celebrates "the romance of rock & roll rebellion", adding that it is vast, engaging, and enduring enough to leave listeners "not just exhilarated but exalted and triumphantly alive". In a five-star review, Down Beat journalist Michael Goldberg said the Clash had produced "a classic rock album which, literally, defines the state of rock and roll and against which the very best of [the 1980s] will have to be judged." Some reviewers expressed reservations, including DJ and critic Charlie Gillett, who believed some of the songs sounded like poor imitations of Bob Dylan backed by a horn section. Garry Bushell was more critical in his review for Sounds, giving the record two out of five stars while claiming the Clash had "retrogressed" to Rolling Stones-style "outlaw imagery" and "tired old rock clichés".

At the end of 1980, London Calling was voted the best album of the year in the Pazz & Jop, an annual poll of American critics published by The Village Voice. Robert Christgau, the poll's creator and supervisor, also named it 1980's best record in an accompanying essay and said, "it generated an urgency and vitality and ambition (that Elvis P. cover!) which overwhelmed the pessimism of its leftist world-view."

=== Reappraisal and legacy ===
Retrospective professional ratings
Review scores
Source	Rating
AllMusic	5/5 stars
Blender	5/5 stars
Chicago Sun-Times	4/4 stars
Christgau's Record Guide	A+
Encyclopedia of Popular Music	5/5 stars
Los Angeles Times	4/4 stars
Q	5/5 stars
The Rolling Stone Album Guide	5/5 stars
Select	5/5
Spin Alternative Record Guide	7/10

London Calling has since been considered by many critics to be one of the greatest rock albums of all time, including AllMusic's Stephen Thomas Erlewine, who said that it sounded more purposeful than "most albums, let alone double albums". "This epic double album, from its iconic sleeve to its wildly eclectic mash-up of styles, is surely the quintessential rock album", wrote BBC Music journalist Mark Sutherland. In Christgau's Record Guide: The '80s (1990), Christgau called it the best double album since the Rolling Stones' Exile on Main St. (1972) and said it expanded upon, rather than compromised, the Clash's driving guitar sound in a "warm, angry, and thoughtful, confident, melodic, and hard-rocking" showcase of their musical abilities. According to the English music writer Dave Thompson, London Calling established the Clash as more than "a simple punk band" with a "potent" album of neurotic post-punk, despite its amalgam of disparate and occasionally disjointed musical influences. Don McLeese from the Chicago Sun-Times regarded it as their best album and "punk's finest hour", as it found the band broadening their artistry without compromising their original vigor and immediacy. PopMatters critic Sal Ciolfi called it a "big, loud, beautiful collection of hurt, anger, restless thought, and above all hope" that still sounds "relevant and vibrant". In a review of its 25th anniversary reissue, Uncut wrote that the songs and characters in the lyrics cross-referenced each other because of the album's exceptional sequencing, adding that "The Vanilla Tapes" bonus disc enhanced what was already a "masterpiece".

London Calling is honored for many excellent reasons, not least its audacity: a double album by the band that personified punk anti-'commercial' brevity and defiance going long and ranging far in both songwriting and instrumentation—the horn-fed 'The Card Cheat' features M. Jones on piano! It was where they announced that they wanted to play with the big boys and buried most of them forthwith.

— Robert Christgau, El País (2019)

In 1987, Robert Hilburn of the Los Angeles Times named it the fourth-best album of the previous 10 years and said, while the Clash's debut was a punk masterpiece, London Calling marked the genre's "coming of age" as the band led the way into "fertile post-punk territory". In 1989, Rolling Stone ranked the 1980 American release as the best album of the 1980s. In the 1994 All Time Top 1000 Albums, Colin Larkin named it the second-greatest punk album; it was also voted number 37 in Larkin's All Time Top 1000 Albums (2000). In 1999, Q magazine named London Calling the fourth-greatest British album of all time, and wrote that it is "the best Clash album and therefore among the very best albums ever recorded". The magazine later ranked it 20th on its list of the 100 Greatest Albums Ever. It has also been ranked as the sixth-greatest album of the 1970s by NME, and the second-best in a similar list by Pitchfork, whose reviewer Amanda Petrusich said that it was the Clash's "creative apex" as a "rock band" rather than as a punk band. In 2003, Rolling Stone ranked it eighth on their list of The 500 Greatest Albums of All Time, maintaining the rating in a 2012 revised list. The rating dropped to 16 in Rolling Stone's revised list in 2020. Entertainment Weekly's Tom Sinclair declared it the "Best Album of All Time" in his headline for a 2004 article on the album. In 2007, it was inducted into the Grammy Hall of Fame, a collection of recordings of lasting qualitative or historical significance. In 2009, the album was profiled in the BBC Radio 1 Masterpieces series, denoting it as one of the most influential albums of all time. In 2024, Loudwire staff elected it as the best hard rock album of 1979.

== 25th anniversary edition ==
Professional ratings
Aggregate scores
Source	Rating
Metacritic	100/100
Review scores
Source	Rating
The Guardian	5/5 stars
Pitchfork	10/10
Rolling Stone	5/5 stars

In 2004, a 25th-anniversary "Legacy Edition" was released with a bonus CD and DVD in digipack packaging. The bonus CD features The Vanilla Tapes, missing recordings made by the band in mid-1979. The DVD includes The Last Testament – The Making of London Calling, a film by Don Letts, as well as previously unseen video footage and music videos. A limited-edition picture disc LP was released in 2010.

The edition was met with widespread critical acclaim. At Metacritic, which assigns a normalised rating out of 100 to reviews from professional critics, it has an average score of 100 out of 100, based on 12 reviews. PopMatters hailed it as "easily one of the best classic re-releases yet", while Paste said "Epic/Legacy has outdone itself." However, Blender recommended consumers opt for the original edition instead, claiming "the demo versions ... sound like an incompetent Clash cover band rehearsing in a sock".

== Track listing ==
All lead vocals by Joe Strummer, except where noted.

All tracks are written by Strummer and Mick Jones, except where noted.

Side one
No.	Title	Writer(s)	Lead vocals	Length
1.	"London Calling"			3:19
2.	"Brand New Cadillac"	Vince Taylor; originally performed by Vince Taylor and his Playboys		2:09
3.	"Jimmy Jazz"			3:52
4.	"Hateful"			2:45
5.	"Rudie Can't Fail"		Strummer, Jones	3:26

Side two
No.	Title	Writer(s)	Lead vocals	Length
1.	"Spanish Bombs"		Strummer, Jones	3:19
2.	"The Right Profile"			3:56
3.	"Lost in the Supermarket"		Jones	3:47
4.	"Clampdown"		Strummer, Jones	3:49
5.	"The Guns of Brixton"	Paul Simonon	Simonon	3:07

Side three
No.	Title	Writer(s)	Lead vocals	Length
1.	"Wrong 'Em Boyo"	Clive Alphonso; originally performed by the Rulers; including "Stagger Lee"		3:10
2.	"Death or Glory"			3:55
3.	"Koka Kola"			1:46
4.	"The Card Cheat"		Jones	3:51

Side four
No.	Title	Writer(s)	Lead vocals	Length
1.	"Lover's Rock"			4:01
2.	"Four Horsemen"			2:56
3.	"I'm Not Down"		Jones	3:00
4.	"Revolution Rock"	Jackie Edwards, Danny Ray; originally performed by Danny Ray and the Revolutionaries		5:37
5.	"Train in Vain"		Jones	3:09

- On the original version of the album, "Train in Vain" was not listed on the sleeve, nor the label on the record itself, but a sticker indicating the track was affixed to the outer cellophane wrapper. It was also scratched into the vinyl in the run-off area on the fourth side of the album. Later editions included the song in the track listing.

25th anniversary edition bonus disc – "The Vanilla Tapes"
No.	Title	Writer(s)	Length
1.	"Hateful"		3:23
2.	"Rudie Can't Fail"		3:08
3.	"Paul's Tune" (Instrumental, early version of "The Guns of Brixton")	Simonon	2:32
4.	"I'm Not Down"		3:24
5.	"Four Horsemen"		2:45
6.	"Koka Kola, Advertising & Cocaine" (Early version of "Koka Kola")		1:57
7.	"Death or Glory"		3:47
8.	"Lover's Rock"		3:45
9.	"Lonesome Me" (Does not appear on "London Calling")	The Clash	2:09
10.	"The Police Walked in 4 Jazz" (Instrumental, early version of "Jimmy Jazz")		2:19
11.	"Lost in the Supermarket"		3:52
12.	"Up-Toon" (Instrumental, early version of "The Right Profile")		1:57
13.	"Walking the Slidewalk" (Instrumental, does not appear on "London Calling")	The Clash	2:34
14.	"Where You Gonna Go (Soweto)" (Does not appear on "London Calling")	Sonny Okosun	4:05
15.	"The Man in Me" (Does not appear on "London Calling")	Bob Dylan	3:57
16.	"Remote Control" (Does not appear on "London Calling")		2:39
17.	"Working and Waiting" (Instrumental, early version of "Clampdown")		4:11
18.	"Heart and Mind" (Does not appear on "London Calling")	The Clash	4:27
19.	"Brand New Cadillac"	Taylor	2:08
20.	"London Calling"		4:26
21.	"Revolution Rock"	Edwards, Ray	3:51

Bonus DVD
No.	Title	Length
1.	"The Last Testament: The Making of London Calling"
2.	"London Calling" (Music video)
3.	"Train in Vain" (Music video)
4.	"Clampdown" (Music video)
5.	"Home video footage of The Clash recording in Wessex Studios"

== Personnel ==
=== The Clash ===
- Joe Strummer – rhythm guitar, vocals, piano
- Mick Jones – lead guitar, vocals, piano, harmonica
- Paul Simonon – bass, vocals
- Topper Headon – drums, percussion

=== Additional musicians ===
- Mickey Gallagher – organ

The Irish Horns

- Ray Bevis – tenor saxophone
- John Earle – tenor and baritone saxophone
- Chris Gower – trombone
- Dick Hanson – trumpet, flugelhorn

=== Production ===
- Guy Stevens – producer
- Bill Price – chief engineer
- Jerry Green – second engineer
- Ray Lowry – design
- Pennie Smith – photography

== Charts ==
=== Original edition ===
1979–1980 chart performance
Chart (1979–1980)	Peak position
Australian Albums (Kent Music Report)	16
Austrian Albums (Ö3 Austria)	17
Canada Top Albums/CDs (RPM)	12
Finnish Albums (The Official Finnish Charts)	8
New Zealand Albums (RMNZ)	12
Norwegian Albums (VG-lista)	4
Swedish Albums (Sverigetopplistan)	2
UK Albums (Official Charts)	9
US Billboard 200	27

2003 chart performance
Chart (2003)	Peak position
Irish Albums (IRMA)	23

2009 chart performance
Chart (2009)	Peak position
Spanish Albums (Promusicae)	52

2011–2012 chart performance
Chart (2011–2012)	Peak position
Polish Albums (OLiS)	38
US Top Catalog Albums (Billboard)	38

2015–2016 chart performance
Chart (2015–2016)	Peak position
French Albums (SNEP)	36
Scottish Albums (Official Charts)	21

2022–2024 chart performance
Chart (2022–2024)	Peak position
Greek Albums (IFPI)	5
Portuguese Albums (AFP)	25

=== 25th anniversary edition ===
2003–2004 chart performance
Chart (2003–2004)	Peak position
Italian Albums (FIMI)	39
Norwegian Albums (VG-lista)	17
Scottish Albums (Official Charts)	24
Swedish Albums (Sverigetopplistan)	45
Swiss Albums (Schweizer Hitparade)	72
UK Albums (Official Charts)	26

== Certifications ==
Certifications for London Calling
Region	Certification	Certified units/sales
Canada (Music Canada)	Gold	50,000^{^}
France (SNEP)	Gold	100,000^{*}
Italy (FIMI)	Platinum	50,000^{‡}
United Kingdom (BPI) original release	2× Platinum	600,000^{‡}
United Kingdom (BPI) 25th anniversary release	Silver	60,000^{‡}
United States (RIAA)	Platinum	1,000,000^{^}
^{*} Sales figures based on certification alone.^{^} Shipments figures based on certification alone.^{‡} Sales+streaming figures based on certification alone.

== See also ==
- Album era

== Bibliography ==
- Gilbert, Pat (2005) [2004]. Passion Is a Fashion: The Real Story of The Clash (4th ed.). London: Aurum Press. pp. 212–213, 235–237, 259–260. ISBN 1-84513-113-4. OCLC 61177239.
- Green, Johnny; Garry Barker (2003) [1997]. A Riot of Our Own: Night and Day with The Clash (3rd ed.). London: Orion. pp. 156–158, 161–162, 165, 194–196, 218–219. ISBN 0-7528-5843-2. OCLC 52990890.
