= Death or Glory (song) =

Song by the Clash

from the album London Calling
- Released: 14 December 1979
- Genre: Rock
- Length: 3:55
- Label: CBS
- Songwriters: Joe Strummer; Mick Jones
- Producer: Guy Stevens

"Death or Glory" is a song by the English rock band the Clash featured on their third studio album London Calling (1979). The song was written by Joe Strummer and Mick Jones and features Strummer on lead vocals. The song was written about the previous generation of rock stars who swore that they would die before growing old.

"Death or Glory" was covered by the American punk rock band Social Distortion on the Lords of Dogtown soundtrack. Dave Smalley also covered the song for the 1999 album City Rockers, a tribute to the Clash. "Death or Glory" is also part of the soundtrack of the video games Skate It (2008) and Skate 2 (2009).

== Background ==
Joe Strummer originally worked out the tune for "Death or Glory" on the piano. He took inspiration from "As Time Goes By", a song featured in the film Casablanca that Strummer expressed his fondness for to director David Mingay during the filming of Rude Boy. While the band was recording "Death or Glory", their producer Guy Stevens came into the studio and started throwing chairs around at the back wall in front of CBS record executives.

== Critical reception ==
Rick Anderson of AllMusic wrote that the song "features the best and most satisfying chord progression and melody the Clash ever came up with". Bill Wyman of Vulture ranked "Death or Glory" as the seventh best Clash song, calling it "one of the band's most raw and emotional performances".

== Personnel ==
- Joe Strummer – lead vocals, rhythm guitar
- Mick Jones – backing vocals, lead guitar
- Paul Simonon – bass guitar
- Topper Headon – drums
