= Spanish Bombs =

Song by the Clash

from the album London Calling
- Released: 14 December 1979
- Recorded: August–September 1979, November 1979
- Studio: Wessex (London)
- Genre: Pop rock; punk rock
- Length: 3:18
- Label: CBS
- Songwriters: Joe Strummer; Mick Jones
- Producer: Guy Stevens

"Spanish Bombs" is a song by the English rock band the Clash, with principal vocals by Joe Strummer and additional vocals by Mick Jones. It was written by Strummer and recorded for the band's third studio album London Calling (1979).

The song also appears on the Clash compilation albums The Story of the Clash, Volume 1 (1988) and Clash on Broadway (1991). AllMusic's Donald A. Guarisco said that the song's "combination of thoughtful lyrics and an energetic performance" made it a "highlight of London Calling".

== Background ==
Strummer wrote the song during the recording sessions for London Calling. He developed the idea for the song while travelling home from Wessex studios in London and listening to a radio news report of ETA terror bombings of tourist hotels on the Costa Brava. It reminded him of the ongoing Provisional Irish Republican Army campaign in the United Kingdom.

== Music and lyrics ==
According to Continente Multicultural and Vulture magazines, "Spanish Bombs" is a pop rock and punk rock song. AllMusic's Donald A. Guarisco described it as a "rousing rocker" with a combination of power chords, quickly strummed acoustic riffs, and "simple but catchy verses and chorus".

"Spanish Bombs" compares the modern day tourist experience of Spain with the circumstances of the Spanish Civil War, and contrasts the "trenches full of poets" to the planeloads of tourists visiting the country's beaches in the post-Franco era. Praising the heroism of the civil war republicans, the song alludes to the death of anti-fascist poet Federico García Lorca, with the line "Oh please leave the ventana open / Federico Lorca is dead and gone" echoing García Lorca's similar line in his poem "Farewell": "If I die, leave the balcony open!" ("Ventana" is Spanish for "window".)

Adrien Begrand of PopMatters remarked that Strummer's references to bomb attacks by Basque separatists in the late 1970s "echoes" Lorca and the Spanish Civil War, citing the line "Spanish bombs rock the province / I'm hearing music from another time".

The song utilises what Adam Mazmanian of The Washington Times calls "pidgin Spanish". According to the liner notes accompanying the original 1979 UK vinyl release of London Calling, the song includes the lyric "Yo t'quierro y finito, yo te querda, oh ma côrazon" (sic). According to The A.V. Club, the lyric is in fact, "Yo te quiero [sic] infinito, yo te quiero [sic], oh mi corazón" which they translate as "I want you forever, I want you, oh my heart". However, according to a comment by Strummer himself in the liner notes for the 25th Anniversary Edition of London Calling, the lyric is "Clash Spannish [sic]", and "means 'I love you and goodbye! I want you but _ oh my aching heart!' induced by those grapes of wrath.[sic]" The song also makes reference to Andalusia, which is located close to the Spanish region where Strummer's ex-girlfriend Palmolive was born.

London Calling, remarked author Michael Chabon, is "what we'd now call 'classic rock'. Songs like 'Spanish Bombs' had me wondering what the song was about, how it related to the Spanish Civil War and why was Joe singing about it?"

== Personnel ==
The Clash

- Joe Strummer – vocals, acoustic guitar
- Mick Jones – vocals, lead guitar
- Paul Simonon – bass guitar
- Topper Headon – drums

Additional Musicians

- Mickey Gallagher – organ

== See also ==
- List of anti-war songs
