= London Calling (song) =

- One of artwork variants using yellow shades as part of background, used for one of early UK releases

Single by the Clash

from the album London Calling
- B-side: "Armagideon Time"
- Released: 7 December 1979
- Recorded: August–September 1979, November 1979
- Studio: Wessex (London)
- Genre: Post-punk; punk rock
- Length: 3:18
- Label: CBS 8087
- Songwriters: Joe Strummer; Mick Jones
- Producer: Guy Stevens

The Clash singles chronology
"I Fought the Law" (1979)	"London Calling" (1979)	"Clampdown" (1980)

The Clash reissued singles chronology
"This Is England" (1985)	"London Calling" (re-release) (1988)	"I Fought the Law" (re-release) (1988)
"Rock the Casbah" (re-release) (1991)	"London Calling" (2nd re-release) (1991)	"Train in Vain" (re-release) (1991)

Music video
- "London Calling" on YouTube

"London Calling" is a song by the English rock band the Clash. It was released as a single from the band's 1979 double album of the same name. This apocalyptic, politically charged rant features the band's post-punk sound, electric guitar and vocals.

== Writing and recording ==
"London Calling"
The song's lyrics were influenced by the March 1979 meltdown of a nuclear reactor at Three Mile Island in Pennsylvania.

The song was written by Joe Strummer and Mick Jones. The title alludes to the BBC World Service's station identification: "This is London calling..." which was used during World War II, often in broadcasts to occupied countries.

The lyrics reflect the concern felt by Strummer about world events with the reference to "a nuclear error" – the incident at Three Mile Island, which occurred earlier in 1979. Joe Strummer has said: "We felt that we were struggling about to slip down a slope or something, grasping with our fingernails. And there was no one there to help us."

The line "London is drowning / And I live by the river" comes from concerns that if the River Thames flooded, most of central London would drown, something that led to the construction of the Thames Barrier which came into operation three years after the song. Strummer references police brutality in the lines "We ain't got no swing / Except for the ring of that truncheon thing" as the Metropolitan Police at the time had a truncheon as standard issued equipment.

The lyrics also reflect desperation of the Clash's situation in 1979 struggling with high debt, without management and arguing with their record label CBS over whether the London Calling album should be a single or double album. The lines referring to "Now don't look to us / Phoney Beatlemania has bitten the dust" reflects the concerns of the band over its situation after the punk rock boom in England had ended in 1977.

According to a retrospective assessment by AllMusic critic Donald A. Guarisco, the song "cleverly crossbreeds anthemic hard rock with reggae by juxtaposing slashing, staccato guitar riffs with an undulating rhythm section beat as Strummer lays down a snarling vocal". Guarisco finds that this gives the song "a hypnotic sense of drive."

The song fades out with a Morse code signal spelling S-O-S, reiterating the earlier urgent sense of emergency, and further alluding to drowning in the river.

"London Calling" was recorded at Wessex Studios located in a former church hall in Highbury in North London. This studio had already proved to be a popular location with the Sex Pistols, the Pretenders and the Tom Robinson Band. The single was produced by Guy Stevens and engineered by Bill Price.

== Personnel ==
=== "London Calling" ===
Sources:

- Joe Strummer – lead and backing vocals, rhythm guitar
- Mick Jones – lead guitars, backing vocals
- Paul Simonon – bass guitar, backing vocals
- Topper Headon – drums

=== "Armagideon Time" ===
- Joe Strummer – lead vocals, piano
- Mick Jones – guitars, sound effects
- Paul Simonon – bass guitar
- Topper Headon – drums, percussion
- Mickey Gallagher – organ

== Artwork ==
Continuing the theme of the retro Elvis Presley-inspired London Calling LP cover, the single sleeve (front and back) is based on old Columbia 78 rpm sleeves. The cover artwork was designed by Ray Lowry and is identical to the Columbia sleeve but with the blank 78 covers from the original changed to classic rock and punk LP sleeves. From left to right they are: the Beatles' debut, Please Please Me; Never Mind the Bollocks, Here's the Sex Pistols; the Rolling Stones' debut album, The Rolling Stones; the Clash's debut album, The Clash; Bob Dylan's Highway 61 Revisited; and Presley's debut LP, Elvis Presley.

== Reissues ==
The single has several issues, all with different covers. Four are from 1979 (catalogue number: 8087; S CBS 8087; 128087; S CBS 8087). In 1988, a special limited edition boxed set was released, containing three tracks, "London Calling" on side one, "Brand New Cadillac" and "Rudie Can't Fail" on side two, a poster and two badges (catalogue number: CLASH B2). Two were released by CBS Records in 1991 (catalogue number: 656946; 31-656946-22), both with "Brand New Cadillac" on the B-side; the second one has an additional track on side two "Return to Brixton (Jeremy Healy 7" Remix)" (see the table below).

In 2012, on the occasion of the International Record Store Day, a limited edition 7" was released, with a new mix of the song by Mick Jones, and an instrumental version on the B-side.

Year	B-side	Format	Label	Country	Note
1979	"Armagideon Time"	45 rpm 7" vinyl	CBS S CBS 8087	UK	Released on 7 December 1979; No. 2 for 1979, No. 37 overall.
1979	1. "Justice Tonight" (Version); 2. "Kick It Over" (Version)	45 rpm 12" vinyl	CBS 128087	UK	A-side: 1. "London Calling"; 2. "Armagideon Time".
1979	"Armagideon Time"	45 rpm 7" vinyl	CBS S CBS 8087	UK	Alternate cover.
1979	"Armagideon Time"	45 rpm 7" vinyl	CBS 8087	NL	—
1980	"London Calling"	45 rpm 7" vinyl	Epic 50851	USA	A-side: "Train in Vain (Stand by Me)". Released on 12 February 1980.
1988	1. "Brand New Cadillac"; 2. "Rudie Can't Fail"	45 rpm 7" vinyl	CBS CLASH 2	UK	Boxed Set; Limited Edition
1991	1. "Brand New Cadillac"; 2. "Return to Brixton" (Jeremy Healy 7" Remix)	45 rpm 12" vinyl	Columbia 31-656946-22	UK	—
1991	"Brand New Cadillac"	45 rpm 7" vinyl	Columbia 656946	UK	—
2012	"London Calling (2012 instrumental)"	45 rpm 7" vinyl	Columbia 88691959247	USA	New 2012 mix by Mick Jones and Bill Price. Released 21 April 2012

== Chart success and critical reception ==
"London Calling" was released as the only single from the album in the UK and reached No. 11 on the UK Singles Chart in January 1980, becoming at once the band's highest-charting single until "Should I Stay or Should I Go" hit No. 1 ten years later. The song did not make the U.S. charts, as "Train in Vain" was released as a single and broke the band in the United States, reaching No. 23 on the Billboard Hot 100 and No. 62 in Canada.

BBC Radio 1 DJ Annie Nightingale made a bet with Strummer that London Calling would make the UK Top 10 without them appearing on Top of the Pops, the stake being a Cadillac ("Brand New Cadillac" being the second track on the London Calling album). When the record peaked at number 11, Nightingale was saved by a listener who donated a Cadillac. The Cadillac was subsequently auctioned to raise funds for the recession-hit steel town of Corby.

"London Calling" was the first Clash song to chart elsewhere in the world, reaching the top 40 in Australia. The success of the single and album was greatly helped by the music video shot by Don Letts showing the band playing the song on a boat at Festival Pier, next to Albert Bridge on the south side of the Thames, Battersea Park in a cold and rainy night at the beginning of December 1979.

The single fell off the charts after 10 weeks, but later re-entered the chart twice, spending a total of 15 non-consecutive weeks on the UK Singles Chart.

Over the years, "London Calling" has become regarded by various critics as the band's finest song. In 2004, Rolling Stone ranked it number 15 in its list of the 500 Greatest Songs of All Time; in the 2021 update, the song was re-ranked at number 143. In 2011, Paste ranked the song number two on their list of the 18 greatest songs by the Clash. In 2020, The Guardian ranked the song number five on their list of the 40 greatest songs by the Clash. It is one of The Rock and Roll Hall of Fame's 500 Songs that Shaped Rock and Roll.

In 2007, the 1979 recording of "London Calling" by the Clash on Epic Records was inducted into the Grammy Hall of Fame.

== Notable appearances and covers ==
The Clash turned down a request from British Telecom to use the song for an advertising campaign in the early 1990s. In 2002, the Clash incurred criticism from some fans of the band when they sold the rights to Jaguar for a car advertisement.

The song was used for a 2012 British Airways advertisement, picturing a jet aeroplane taxiing through the streets of London passing numerous landmarks and parking outside the Olympic Stadium.

Joe Strummer later became a DJ for the BBC World Service, on a programme called "Joe Strummer's London Calling".

Following the 2022 Russian invasion of Ukraine, the Clash gave permission to a Ukrainian punk band named Beton to rewrite the song as an anti-invasion anthem and charity fundraiser titled "Kyiv Calling".

== Charts ==
=== Weekly charts ===
Chart (1979–1980)	Peak position
Australia (Kent Music Report)	28
Ireland (IRMA)	16
New Zealand (Recorded Music NZ)	23
UK (Official Charts Company)	11
US Billboard Hot Dance Club Play	30

Chart (1988)	Peak position
UK (Official Charts Company)	46

Chart (1991)	Peak position
Ireland (IRMA)	18
Sweden (Sverigetopplistan)	30
UK (Official Charts Company)	64

== Certifications ==
Region	Certification	Certified units/sales
Canada (Music Canada)	Platinum	80,000^{‡}
Italy (FIMI) sales since 2009	Gold	25,000^{‡}
New Zealand (RMNZ)	Platinum	30,000^{‡}
Spain (Promusicae)	Gold	30,000^{‡}
United Kingdom (BPI)	Platinum	600,000^{‡}
^{‡} Sales+streaming figures based on certification alone.

== Sources ==
- Gilbert, Pat (2005) [2004]. Passion Is a Fashion: The Real Story of The Clash (4th ed.). London: Aurum Press. ISBN 1-84513-113-4. OCLC 61177239.
- Green, Johnny & Barker, Garry (2003) [1997]. A Riot of Our Own: Night and Day with The Clash (3rd ed.). London: Orion. ISBN 0-7528-5843-2. OCLC 52990890.
- Salewicz, Chris (15 May 2007). Redemption Song: The Ballad of Joe Strummer (1st American ed.). New York: Faber and Faber. ISBN 978-0-571-21178-4. OCLC 76794852.
