= Clampdown =

1979 song by the Clash

Single by the Clash

from the album London Calling
- B-side: "The Guns of Brixton"
- Released: 1980
- Recorded: August–September 1979, November 1979
- Studio: Wessex (London)
- Genre: Punk rock
- Length: 3:50
- Label: CBS ES 486
- Songwriters: Joe Strummer; Mick Jones
- Producer: Guy Stevens

The Clash singles chronology
"London Calling" (1979)	"Clampdown" (1980)	"Train in Vain" (1980)

"Clampdown" is a song by the English rock band the Clash from their third studio album London Calling (1979). The song began as an instrumental track called "Working and Waiting". It is sometimes called "Working for the Clampdown", which is the main lyric of the song and also the title provided on the album's lyric sheet. Its lyrics concern those who have forsaken the idealism of youth and urges young people to fight the status quo. The word "clampdown" is a neat cover-all term the writers adopted to define the oppressive Establishment, notably its more reactionary voices who were to be heard throughout the 1970s calling alarmingly for "clampdowns" by government and law enforcement on strikers, agitators, benefits claimants, football hooligans, punks and other perceived threats to the social, economic and moral wellbeing of the UK.

In 1980, "Clampdown" was released as a single backed with "The Guns of Brixton" in Australia. The single was not released in any other territories, with the exception of US promos.

== Analysis of lyrics ==
"Clampdown" was written by Joe Strummer and Mick Jones.

The song's lyrics, written by Joe Strummer, refers to the perceived failures of capitalist society. The wearing of the "blue and brown" refers to the colour of the uniforms that are mostly worn by workers. This idea goes along with lyrics that refer to "young believers" who are brought and bought into the capitalist system by those "working for the clampdown" who will "teach our twisted speech". Alternatively, it could be suggested that the blue and brown refer to shirt colours, the fascist Blueshirts of 1930s Ireland and the Brownshirts of the early Nazis in Germany. Strummer wrote,

The men in the factory are old and cunning
You don't owe nothing, so boy get running!
It's the best years of your life they want to steal!
You grow up and you calm down and you're working for the clampdown.
You start wearing the blue and brown and you're working for the clampdown.
So you got someone to boss around. It makes you feel big now...

These lyrics are seen to refer to how one gets caught by the capital economic system and its ethos of work, debt, power, position and conformist lifestyle. Strummer, who proclaimed himself a socialist, also uses the song's closing refrain to highlight this mindset as a potential trap and offers a warning not to give oneself over to "the clampdown". This is emphasised in the coda by Jones's repetition of the words "work" and "more work" on the beat over Strummer's breathy repetition of the phrase "working for the clampdown". This reaffirms the idea that Strummer saw "the clampdown" as a threat to all who get caught up in the modern economic wage-hour system. Bass player and Clash co-founder Paul Simonon, in an interview with the LA Times, spoke about the opportunities available to him in the early 1970s UK after he finished his secondary education:

What was worse was that when it got time for us to start leaving school, they took us out on trips to give us an idea of what jobs were available. But they didn't try to introduce us to anything exciting or meaningful. They took us to the power station and the Navy yards. It was like saying, 'This is all you guys could ever do.' Some of the kids fell for it. When we got taken down to the Navy yards, we went on a ship and got cooked up dinner and it was all chips and beans. It was really great. So some of the kids joined up – because the food was better than they ate at home.

— Paul Simonon,

Strummer, like Simonon, spent time on the dole, but Strummer did not come from a lower-class family. In the same interview with the LA Times Strummer said,

You see, I'm not like Paul or the others, I had a chance to be a 'good, normal person' with a nice car and a house in the suburbs – the golden apple or whatever you call it. But I saw through it. I saw it was an empty life.

— Joe Strummer,

Strummer's father was a British diplomat, and Joe was sent away to boarding school where he detested "the thick rich people’s thick rich kids". Strummer said,

I only saw my father once a year (after being sent to boarding school). He was a real disciplinarian who was always giving me speeches about how he had pulled himself up by the sweat of his brow: a real guts and determination man. What he was really saying to me was, 'If you play by the rules, you can end up like me'. And I saw right away I didn't want to end up like him. Once I got out on my own, I realized I was right. I saw how the rules worked and I didn't like them.

— Joe Strummer,

The Clash "Clampdown" (1979)
Sample of "Clampdown" taken from London Calling

Later verses suggest an alternative in revolution, a theme common throughout Joe Strummer's songwriting. This point of view also points to the lyric "You start wearing the blue and brown" as supporting their cause. The barely audible lyrics at the beginning of the song were deciphered by Clash fan Ade Marks, and first published in Q magazine's Clash special:

The kingdom is ransacked, the jewels all taken back
And the chopper descends
They're hidden in the back, with a message on a half-baked tape
With the spool going round, saying I'm back here in this place
And I could cry
And there's smoke you could click on
What are we going to do now?

== Analysis of music ==
The song is mostly in the key of A major, with a key change to E major in the bridge.

The coda features a bouncing dance, alternating between G and F# chords as the riff slowly fades, featuring Strummer's ad libs and the repeated lyric based on "work".

== Cover versions ==
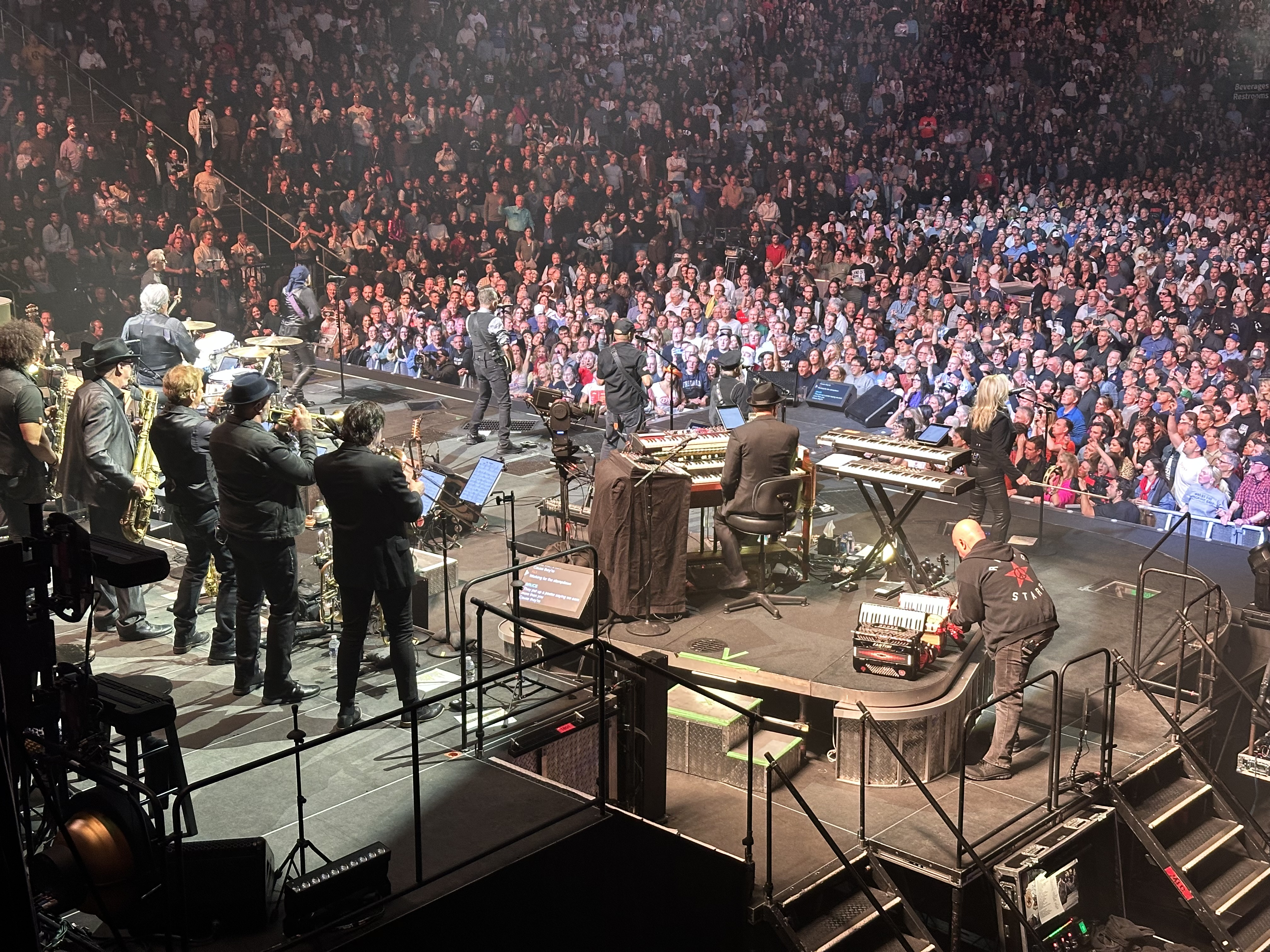
Bruce Springsteen and Tom Morello sharing lead vocals on "Clampdown" during one of Springsteen and the E Street Band's Lohad / No Kings 2026 shows

"Clampdown" was performed by Rage Against the Machine at their first live show in 1991, as well as during a show in Antwerp, Belgium, on 2 June 2008. It was recorded by Indigo Girls and can be heard on Rarities (2005) as well as the Clash tribute album Burning London: The Clash Tribute (1999). The song was also performed several times by the Strokes, most notably in 2003 at the Alexandra Palace, which was used as the B-side to their "The End Has No End" single. The Strokes also played their interpretation at their July 2004 T in the Park appearance. Poster Children recorded it on their 2004 release, On the Offensive, and James Dean Bradfield performed it on his solo tour in October 2006. Another band that recorded this song was Hot Water Music, on their B-sides and rarities compilation album called Till the Wheels Fall Off. The song was also interpreted by the National on the album A Tribute to The Clash, and by Inward Eye, which released through a video on their YouTube channel. Bruce Springsteen and the E Street Band performed the song a few times on their 2014 High Hopes Tour and again regularly on the politically-focused Land of Hope and Dreams No Kings Tour of 2026; in both cases it was when Tom Morello was appearing with them. Metallica played the song at the 2016 Bridge School Benefit. District Attorney of Philadelphia Larry Krasner performed the song with the punk band Sheer Mag days before his first election to office in May 2017, as documented in his memoir For the People: A Story of Justice and Power.

== Popular reference ==
The song was featured in the Futurama episode, "The Silence of the Clamps", where the song is played over a montage of Clamps and Fry spending time together. The song was also used in the US television show Malcolm in the Middle during an episode where Malcolm and some misfits organize an anti-prom called "Morp".

In September 2018, during one of the debates between incumbent United States senator Ted Cruz and United States congressman Beto O'Rourke held as part of the campaign for that year's United States Senate election in Texas, O'Rourke claimed that Cruz was "working for the clampdown". O'Rourke would later use the song in his official campaign launch in El Paso.

== Rock Band music gaming platform ==
It was made available to download on 1 February 2011 for use in the Rock Band 3 music gaming platform in both Basic rhythm, and PRO mode which utilizes real guitar/bass guitar, and MIDI compatible electronic drum kits/keyboards in addition to vocals.

== Track listing ==
7" vinyl (Australia)

1. "Clampdown" (Strummer/Jones) – 3:48
2. "Guns of Brixton" (Paul Simonon) – 3:09

== Personnel ==
The following people contributed to "Clampdown":

The Clash

- Joe Strummer – vocals, rhythm guitar
- Mick Jones – vocals, lead guitar
- Paul Simonon – bass guitar
- Topper Headon – drums, percussion

Additional musician

- Mickey Gallagher – organ

Production

- Guy Stevens – producer
- Bill Price – chief engineer
- Jerry Green – second engineer
