= Train in Vain =

- 1980 New Zealand release

Single by the Clash

from the album London Calling
- B-side: "London Calling"
- Released: 12 February 1980
- Recorded: 1979
- Studio: Wessex (London)
- Genre: Punk rock; funk rock; soul; new wave; pop
- Length: 3:09
- Label: Columbia
- Songwriters: Joe Strummer; Mick Jones
- Producer: Guy Stevens

The Clash singles chronology
"Clampdown" (1980)	"Train in Vain" (1980)	"Bankrobber" (1980)

The Clash reissued singles chronology
"London Calling" (2nd re-release) (1991)	"Train in Vain" (re-release) (1991)	"Complete Control" (live) (1999)

Audio video
- "Train in Vain" on YouTube

"Train in Vain" (or "Train in Vain (Stand by Me)") is a song by the English punk rock band the Clash. It was released as the third and final single from their third studio album, London Calling (1979). The song was not originally listed on the album's track listing, appearing as a hidden track at the end of the album. This was because the track was added to the record at the last minute, when the sleeve was already in production. Some editions include the song in the track listing. "Train in Vain" was the first single by the Clash to reach the Top 40 of the Billboard Hot 100 chart in the United States and in 2010, the song was ranked number 298 on Rolling Stone magazine's list of The 500 Greatest Songs of All Time.

In the US and Canada, the song's title is expanded to "Train in Vain (Stand by Me)", as the words "stand by me" dominate the chorus. It was titled "Train in Vain" in part to avoid confusion with Ben E. King's 1961 song "Stand by Me".

== Origins ==
It was a Saturday afternoon when Mick Jones invited me to hear the finished album. Walking into Wessex, I saw him in the vocal booth, laying down vocals for a new song.

By Monday night, "Train in Vain" was finished. Originally mooted as an NME giveaway flexi, it became the final track on London Calling – too late, however, to include on art-work that had already gone to the printers.

— Bill Price

"Train in Vain" was added after the deal for the band to write a song for an NME flexi disc fell through, and as Mick Jones later said "The real story on 'Train in Vain' is that originally we needed a song to give to the NME for a flexi disk that NME was going to do. And then it was decided that it didn't work out or decided the flexi disk didn't work out so we had this spare track we had done as a giveaway. So we put it on London Calling but there wasn't time because the sleeves were already done." The result of its late addition was that it was the only song without lyrics printed on the insert, and was not listed as a track, but its title and position on the original vinyl record was scratched into the vinyl in the needle run-off area on the fourth side of the album.

== Meaning and inspiration ==
When the album London Calling (1979) was released, many fans assumed it was called "Stand by Me", but the meaning of the song's title is obscure as the title phrase cannot be found in the lyrics. Mick Jones, who wrote most of the song, offered this explanation: "The track was like a train rhythm, and there was, once again, that feeling of being lost."

The song has been interpreted by some as a response to "Typical Girls" by the Slits, which mentions girls standing by their men. Mick Jones split up with Slits guitarist Viv Albertine shortly before he wrote the song.

The song has been interpreted to be about Jones's volatile relationship with Albertine, who commented "I'm really proud to have inspired that but often he won't admit to it. He used to get the train to my place in Shepherd's Bush and I would not let him in. He was bleating on the doorstep. That was cruel". The couple separated around the time of the recording sessions for London Calling (1979).

== Critical reception ==
Cash Box wrote that this was Clash's "most commercial effort ... to date", stating that "an infectious rhythm has supplanted the three chord guitar attack" and added that Joe Strummer's playing is "more restrained but equally as effective". Record World wrote that "Mick Jones' vocals reach expressive cries and the overall sound has a crisp, rockabilly feel that should move the Clash into best-seller status."

== Formats and track listings ==
"Train in Vain" was released in mainland Europe as a 33 rpm single in June 1980 (catalogue number CBS 8370) and included the tracks "Bankrobber" and "Rockers Galore... UK Tour". In the UK, "Train in Vain" was not released as a single at the time; only "Bankrobber" and "Rockers Galore... UK Tour" were released on a 7" single in August 1980 (catalogue number CBS 8323). The song was released in the US as a 10" white label promo in 1979 (catalogue number AS 749). The US commercial release of 12 February 1980 (catalogue number 50851) consisted of a 7" that included the track "London Calling". The 1991 UK re-release (catalogue number 657430 7) included the track "The Right Profile". The formats and track listings of "Train in Vain (Stand By Me)" are tabulated below:

Year	B-side	Format	Label	Country	Note
1979	"Train in Vain (Stand by Me)" – 3:10	33⅓ rpm 10" vinyl	Epic AS 749	US	Promo
1980	"London Calling"	45 rpm 7" vinyl	Epic 50851	US	
1980	1. "Bankrobber" – 4:33; 2. "Rockers Galore... UK Tour" – 4:39	33⅓ rpm 7" vinyl	CBS 8370	Europe	
1991	"The Right Profile" – 3:51	45 rpm 7" vinyl	Columbia 657430 7	UK	Reissue
1991	1. "The Right Profile" – 3:55; 2. "Train In Vain ('91 7" Remix)" – 3:02; 3. "Death or Glory" – 3:56	CD	Columbia 657430 5	UK	Reissue
1991	"The Right Profile"	Cassette tape	CBS 50851	UK	

"Train in Vain" also features on the Clash albums The Story of the Clash, Volume 1 (1988), Clash on Broadway (1991), The Singles (1991), From Here to Eternity: Live (1999) (live version recorded on 13 June 1981 at Bond's Casino, New York), The Essential Clash (2003), Singles Box (2006) (disc eleven – Spanish 7" issue), The Singles (2007), Sound System (2013) and The Clash Hits Back (2013).

== Personnel ==
- Mick Jones – vocals, guitar, harmonica
- Joe Strummer – piano
- Paul Simonon – bass guitar
- Topper Headon – drums, percussion
- Mick Gallagher – organ

== Charts ==
Year	Chart (1980)	Peak position
1980	Canada Top Singles (RPM)	62
1980	New Zealand (Recorded Music NZ)	26
1980	US Billboard Hot 100	23
1980	US Dance Club Songs (Billboard)	30

== Certifications ==
Certifications for "Train in Vain"
Region	Certification	Certified units/sales
Canada (Music Canada)	Gold	40,000^{‡}
New Zealand (RMNZ)	Gold	15,000^{‡}
United Kingdom (BPI)	Silver	200,000^{‡}
^{‡} Sales+streaming figures based on certification alone.

== Covers and samples ==
"Train in Vain" has been covered by varied artists such as the British indie dance band EMF, American country singer Dwight Yoakam, and San Francisco rockers Third Eye Blind.

Annie Lennox recorded a soulful, dance-beat cover of the song on her 1995 album Medusa, and performed the song in her appearance during the twentieth season of Saturday Night Live.

Drummer and producer Butch Vig of the US rock group Garbage used a drum loop from "Train in Vain" for their 1995 song "Stupid Girl". Joe Strummer and Mick Jones received a co-writing credit and royalties from the Garbage song under its original release. In 2007, when the song was remastered for a Garbage greatest hits album, the writing credit for the song named all four members of the Clash.

Manic Street Preachers released a live cover of the song on their "You Stole the Sun from My Heart" single in 1999.

The song was also covered by Atlanta alt-rock outfit Blueburst, featuring Marty Willson-Piper (the church, Noctorum, All About Eve) on guitar. Guitarist vocalist Craig Douglas Miller was inspired to make a slower and more somber version of the classic after the events of Summer 2020, when Miller noticed that the lyrics could have been a disillusioned American singing to their country.
