= The Guns of Brixton =

1979 song by the Clash

Song by the Clash

from the album London Calling
- Released: 14 December 1979
- Recorded: August–September, November 1979
- Studio: Wessex (London)
- Genre: Reggae
- Length: 3:07
- Label: CBS
- Songwriter: Paul Simonon
- Producer: Guy Stevens

"The Guns of Brixton" is a song by the English rock band the Clash, originally released on their third studio album London Calling (1979). It was written and sung by bassist Paul Simonon, who grew up in Brixton, South London. The song has a strong reggae influence, reflecting the culture of the area and the reggae gangster film The Harder They Come (1972).

== Origins and recording ==
"The Guns of Brixton" was the Clash's first song to be composed and sung by Paul Simonon. By the time of London Calling, Simonon had learned to play guitar and started contributing more to the songwriting.

"You don't get paid for designing posters or doing the clothes", he said in an interview published by Bassist Magazine in October 1990, "you get paid for doing the songs."

The band, separated from manager Bernard Rhodes, had to leave their rehearsal studio in Camden Town and find another location. They began work on London Calling during the summer of 1979 at the Vanilla Studios in Pimlico. The band quickly wrote and recorded demos, and in August 1979 entered Wessex Studios to begin recording the album. Produced by Guy Stevens, who at the time had alcohol and drug problems and whose production methods were unconventional, it was recorded within a matter of weeks, with many songs, including "The Guns of Brixton", recorded in one or two takes. It was also revealed that while recording the lead vocals for the song, Simonon sang while staring directly at a CBS executive who had visited the studio during the sessions, giving Simonon the desired amount of emotion in his voice.

A section of the song is sung by a very young Maria Gallagher, accompanied by her father Mick Gallagher on the keyboards, as a reprise at the end of the song "Broadway" on the 1980 Clash album Sandinista!.

== Personnel ==
- Paul Simonon – lead vocals, bass guitar (studio), rhythm guitar (live)
- Mick Jones – lead guitars, backing vocals
- Joe Strummer – rhythm guitar (studio), bass guitar (live)
- Topper Headon – drums, percussion
- Mickey Gallagher – organ

== Lyrics and music ==
"The Guns of Brixton" predates the riots that took place in the 1980s in Brixton but the lyrics depict the feelings of discontent in the area because of the heavy-handedness of the police, the recession and other problems at the time. The lyrics refer to a Brixton-born son of Jamaican immigrants who "feel[s] like Ivan ... at the end of The Harder they Come", referring to Ivanhoe Martin's death in the 1972 film The Harder They Come. Simonon was originally doubtful about the song's lyrics, which discuss an individual's paranoid outlook on life, but was encouraged to continue working on it by Joe Strummer.

Although the Clash had written and performed previous songs that combined reggae with punk rock, "The Guns of Brixton" was the first Clash song that was created purely as a reggae song. The rhythm guitar line has a Jamaican rocksteady sound. According to Allmusic critic Rick Anderson, "No song on London Calling (or on any previous album) demonstrated their mastery of reggae as effectively as 'Guns of Brixton' did."

== Return to Brixton ==
"Return to Brixton"
- Artwork for 7-inch vinyl and standard CD editions

Single by The Clash
- Released: July 1990
- Genre: Dub
- Length: 3:07
- Label: CBS
- Songwriter: Paul Simonon
- Producer: Guy Stevens

The Clash singles chronology
"I Fought the Law" (1988)	"Return to Brixton" (1990)	"Should I Stay or Should I Go" (1991)

"The Guns of Brixton" was not initially released as a single, but a version of the song, taken from the remastered version of London Calling and remixed by Jeremy Healy, was released by CBS as a CD single, 7-inch vinyl and 12-inch vinyl entitled "Return to Brixton" in July 1990 (catalog number 656072-2). It reached #57 on the UK Singles Chart.

CD single track listing

1. "Return to Brixton" – 3:47
2. "Return to Brixton" – 6:55
3. "Return to Brixton" (SW2 Dub) – 6:00
4. "The Guns of Brixton" – 3:09

Chart (1990)	Peak position
UK Singles (Official Charts)	57

== Live performances ==
"The Guns of Brixton" was a mainstay in the Clash's live set. When performing the song live, Simonon switched instruments with Strummer because he couldn't play the bass line while singing lead vocals at the same time.

A somewhat heavier, faster version than the one found on London Calling appeared on the 1999 live compilation From Here to Eternity: Live.

== Covers and samples ==
Norman Cook (also known as Fatboy Slim) sampled the bass line for Beats International's 1990 song "Dub Be Good to Me", which became a No. 1 hit in the UK. Simonon, interviewed by Scott Rowley in October 1999 for Bassist Magazine, said that he "was surprised that it became number one that was quite shocking. The fact that it was my performance that they had lifted. The smart thing would've been to copy it and change it slightly, but they just lifted it straight off. So, really, I have done Top of the Pops, but I met up with Norman [Cook] and we came to an arrangement which was much needed at the time. But I thought it was a really good idea and it was quite reassuring for that to happen to my first song."

Cypress Hill sampled the bassline on "What's Your Number?" from the 2004 album Till Death Do Us Part. The song also features Tim Armstrong on guitar.

Jimmy Cliff covered the song on his 2011 Sacred Fire EP, and 2012 album Rebirth, produced by Armstrong. Will Hermes has called the cover "the sound of history circling in wondrous ways" because the song references Cliff's character Ivan from The Harder They Come.

Argentine rock band Los Fabulosos Cadillacs covered this song keeping its original English lyrics in their first live album En Vivo en Buenos Aires, released in 1994. They had previously covered another The Clash-performed song, Revolution Rock, in 1988.

== Other legacy ==
- Reverend and the Makers frontman Jon McClure stated that his band's song "Nostalgia" from the album ThirtyTwo was "my attempt at a modern 'Guns of Brixton'".
- Brix Smith Start (born Laura Salenger), a former member of the Fall and the ex-wife of Mark E. Smith, derived her name from the title of the song.

== Sources ==
- Gilbert, Pat (2005) [2004]. Passion Is a Fashion: The Real Story of The Clash (4th ed.). London: Aurum Press. ISBN 1-84513-113-4. OCLC 61177239.
- Green, Johnny; Garry Barker (2003) [1997]. A Riot of Our Own: Night and Day with The Clash (3rd ed.). London: Orion. ISBN 0-7528-5843-2. OCLC 52990890.
