= A Final Hit – The Greatest Hits =

Greatest hits album by Leftfield
- Released: 3 October 2005
- Genre: Electronic; trip hop; dub techno; house
- Length: 79:55
- Label: Sony BMG
- Producer: Leftfield

Leftfield chronology
Stealth Remixes (2000)	A Final Hit – The Greatest Hits (2005)	Tourism (2012)

Professional ratings
Review scores
Source	Rating
AllMusic	4/5 stars

A Final Hit is a greatest hits album by the English electronic duo Leftfield, featuring all of their single releases, songs which were released on film soundtracks and others. A Limited Edition release contained a bonus DVD with music videos to seven of the singles released by the band themselves.

== Track listing ==
No.	Title	Length
1.	"Release The Pressure" (featuring Earl Sixteen)	3:58
2.	"Afro Left" (featuring Djum Djum)	7:33
3.	"Song of Life"	7:00
4.	"Original" (featuring Toni Halliday)	4:08
5.	"Storm 3000"	5:47
6.	"Open Up" (featuring John Lydon)	3:48
7.	"Dusted" (featuring Roots Manuva)	4:41
8.	"Phat Planet"	5:23
9.	"Afrika Shox" (featuring Afrika Bambaataa)	5:36
10.	"Not Forgotten" (Hard Hands Remix)	7:37
11.	"A Final Hit" (from the Trainspotting soundtrack)	3:16
12.	"Swords" (featuring Nicole Willis)	5:08
13.	"Shallow Grave" (from the Shallow Grave soundtrack)	4:28
14.	"Snakeblood" (from The Beach soundtrack)	5:39
15.	"More Than I Know"	5:46

- The track "Phat Planet" was featured on the Guinness' 1999 advert Surfer.

=== Bonus DVD ===
No.	Title	Length
1.	"Open Up" (featuring John Lydon)
2.	"Original" (featuring Toni Halliday)
3.	"Afro Left" (featuring Djum Djum)
4.	"Release The Pressure" (featuring Earl Sixteen & Cheshire Cat with Ad-libs from Papa Dee)
5.	"Afrika Shox" (featuring Afrika Bambaataa)
6.	"Dusted" (featuring Roots Manuva)
7.	"Swords" (featuring Nicole Willis)
