= Tourism (Leftfield album) =

Live album by Leftfield
- Released: 13 March 2012
- Recorded: 5–18 March 2011, Australia
- Genre: Electronic; trip hop; dub techno; house
- Length: 102:59
- Producer: Leftfield

Leftfield chronology
A Final Hit – The Greatest Hits (2005)	Tourism (2012)	Alternative Light Source (2015)

Tourism is a live album by the English electronic music group Leftfield released in March 2012 with an accompanying DVD with visuals from their 2011 tour, made by the visual artist collective Ne1co. The album was recorded from 5–18 March 2011 at Future Music Festival across Australia and at The Enmore Theatre, Sydney and The Palace, Melbourne.

== Track listing ==
1. "Intro" – 2:04
2. "Song of Life" – 9:09
3. "Black Flute" – 8:40
4. "Original" – 7:59
5. "Afro-Left" – 10:21
6. "Storm 3000" – 9:59
7. "Release the Pressure" – 9:14
8. "Inspection (Check One)" – 10:14
9. "Afrika Shox" – 8:01
10. "Space Shanty" – 10:24
11. "Melt" – 6:47
12. "Phat Planet" – 10:07

== Personnel ==
=== Leftfield ===
- Neil Barnes - keyboards, programming, vocoder, melodica, berimbau, theremin, guitar, percussion
- Adam Wren - engineering, turntables, samples, live mixdown

=== Additional musicians ===
- Sebastien Beresford - drums, percussion, programming

=== Vocalists ===
- Jess Mills on "Original"
- Djum Djum on "Afro Left"
- Cheshire Cat on "Release the Pressure" and "Inspection: Check One"
- Earl 16 on "Release the Pressure"
