= Repercussions (band) =

American R&B, and acid jazz group

- Origin: New York City, U.S.
- Genres: R&B, Acid Jazz, Neo Soul
- Years active: 1989–1997
- Labels: Warner Records, Pony Canyon
- Past members: Aya; Michael Scott Barkham; Dana Bryant; Gordon Clay; Andy Faranda; Teddy Harris; Mark Anthony Jones; Jonathan Maron; Itaal Shur; Genji Siraisi; Chris Ifatoye Theberge; Nicole Willis; Daniel Wyatt

Repercussions were an American R&B, neo soul and acid jazz group of the 1990s, formed by members, percussionists Gordon "Nappy G" Clay & Daniel Wyatt who met as students at Columbia University. Gordon Clay played timbales, bongos and other percussion while Daniel Wyatt played congas (tumba & quinto) Other members included Andy Faranda on guitar, singer, songwriter and producer Nicole Willis, and members of Groove Collective musician and producer Genji Siraisi on drums, musician Itaal Shur on keyboards, and the highly lauded Jonathan Maron on bass, briefly Chris Ifatoye Theberge, as well as keyboard players Michael Scott Barkham and Teddy Harris, oral poetic performance artist Dana Bryant and later members whom appeared solely on the album "Charmed Life", Mark Anthony Jones and Aya. The group frequently performed at S.O.B.'s Giant Step opening for artists such as Massive Attack, Gil Scott Heron, Gang Starr and more. The group released two studio albums.

== Career ==
The group was signed to Warner Bros. records, and in 1995 released their debut album Earth and Heaven.

Repercussions recorded a cover of “Let’s Do It Again” produced by Gary Katz for “All Men Are Brothers: A Tribute to Curtis Mayfield”, with Curtis Mayfield singing the second verse, his first vocal recording after a debilitating accident left him quadriplegic.

In 1997 they released a second album on Pony Canyon titled "Charmed Life". New vocalists featured Lysa "Aya" Treiner and Mark Anthony Jones alongside Nicole Willis. After the release of this album, the group disbanded.

Nicole Willis went on to collaborate with Leftfield on the single "Swords", from Rhythm and Stealth (Hard Hands/Sony 1999), receiving a UK Platinum Awarded record, and have a critically successful career most notably in collaboration with the Soul Investigators, with their title track of Finland Gold selling album Keep Reachin Up getting the attention of POTUS Barack Obama's re-election rally playlist team.

== Discography ==
=== Albums ===
Year	Album title	Label	U.S. R&B Albums
1995	Earth and Heaven	Warner Bros.	40
1997	Charmed Life	Pony Canyon	–

=== Singles ===
Year	Song title	Billboard Hot Dance
1992	Promise/Field Trippin'	
1994	Let's Do It Again	
1995	Promise Me Nothing	peak 6
1995	Find Your Way	
1997	Love, Again	
