= Backlog (album) =

Compilation album by Leftfield/Djum Djum
- Released: 14 December 1992
- Genre: Electronic
- Length: 66:10
- Label: Outer Rhythm / Rhythm King
- Producer: Neil Barnes, Mat Clark, Neil Cole (tracks 9 & 10)

Leftfield chronology
Backlog (1992)	Leftism (1995)

Backlog is a joint compilation album by electronic musicians Leftfield and Djum Djum, released in 1992. It contained mixes of Leftfield's first two releases "Not Forgotten" and "More Than I Know" from between 1990 and 1991 and two mixes by Neil Barnes of the Djum Djum track "Difference". It was released on CD in December 1992 on the Outer Rhythm label. Djum Djum is the stage name of rapper Neil Cole.

== Track listing ==
All tracks written by Neil Barnes except where stated.

1. "Not Forgotten" (Original Mix) – 6:39
2. "Not Forgotten" (Fateh's On the Case Mix) – 6:12
3. "Not Forgotten" (Dub Mix) – 4:46
4. "More Than I Know" (12" Mix) – 6:42
5. "Not Forgotten" (Hard Hands Mix) – 7:36
6. "More Than I Know" (10k Mix) – 8:37
7. "More Than I Know" (More Mix) – 7:29
8. "More Than I Know" (Even More Mix) – 4:22
9. "Difference" (Steng Mix) – 7:06 (Djum Djum) – written by Neil Cole (a.k.a. Djum Djum)/Neil Barnes
10. "Difference" (Cake Mix) – 6:41 (Djum Djum) – written by Neil Cole (a.k.a. Djum Djum)/Neil Barnes

== Credits ==
- Production: Neil Barnes, Neil Cole (9, 10), Paul Daley (5)
- Engineer: Mat Clarke
