= Stealth Remixes =

Remix album by Leftfield
- Released: 29 May 2000
- Genre: Electronica
- Length: 42:30
- Label: Hard Hands / Higher Ground / Sony BMG
- Producer: Leftfield

Leftfield chronology
Rhythm and Stealth (1999)	Stealth Remixes (2000)	A Final Hit: Greatest Hits (2005)

Alternative Cover
- Alternative Cover for South African Release.

Professional ratings
Review scores
Source	Rating
Allmusic	3/5 stars

Stealth Remixes is an album by Leftfield released on 29 May 2000. It was originally on Leftfield's official web-site. It was a follow-up to 1999's Rhythm and Stealth and essentially contained remixes of songs from that album. The album was released on CD and double-12". Later, it was released as a double album along with Rhythm and Stealth.

== Track listing ==
1. "Phat Planet (Dave Clarke Remix)" – 5:52
2. "El Cid (I-Cube Simple Mix)" – 5:52
3. "Rino's Prayer (Nick Rapaccioli Remix)" – 5:39
4. "Chant of a Poor Man (Mighty Quark Remix)" – 5:24
5. "Dub Gussett (Maas Remix)" – 6:33
6. "El Cid (I-Cube Table Tennis Remix)" – 6:49
7. "Double Flash (Headstarter Remix)" – 6:11
8. "Afrika Shox (CD-Rom Video Version)" – 4:52
9. "Dusted (CD-Rom Video Version)" – 4:43

== South African/Japanese track listing ==
1. "Afro Ride" – 9:10
2. "Original (Live Dub)" – 7:37
3. "Filter Fish" – 7:40
4. "Afro Central" – 7:43
5. "Cut For Life" – 7:02
6. "Phat Planet (Dave Clarke Remix)" – 5:52
7. "El Cid (I-Cube Simple Mix)" – 5:52
8. "Rino's Prayer (Nick Rapaccioli Remix)" – 5:39
9. "Chant of a Poor Man (Mighty Quark Remix)" – 5:24
10. "Dub Gussett (Maas Remix)" – 6:33
11. "Double Flash (Headstarter Remix)" – 6:11
