= Rhythm King =

British independent record label

Rhythm King Records Ltd was a British independent record label, founded in the mid-1980s by Martin Heath, Adele Nozedar, DJ Jay Strongman and James Horrocks. It was based in Chiswick, London.

== History ==
=== Beginnings ===
Starting out as an offshoot of Daniel Miller's critically acclaimed Mute Records, Rhythm King's initial focus was dance music - specifically house, acid house, acid jazz, sampling culture and hip hop/rap. Strongman's rap/funk offshoot, Flame Records, signed proto-gangsta rapper Schoolly D and Chuck Brown & the Soul Searchers amongst others. James Horrocks left the label at the end of 1987, and subsequently went on to form React Music Limited in 1990, which also had a focus upon dance music. This left Martin Heath in sole charge of the label; however by the beginning of 1988, Rhythm King was to enjoy a period of short-term success, which went hand in hand with the partial dominance dance music had on the UK Singles Chart, from the late 1980s to the beginning of the 2000s.

=== January 1988 - First UK Singles Chart breakthrough - The Beatmasters / Bomb the Bass ===
The breakthrough was the single "Rok da House" by The Beatmasters featuring The Cookie Crew. Initially reaching No. 78 when first released in July 1987, the single was re-released in January 1988 and reached No. 5 in the UK Singles Chart in February 1988. It is acknowledged as not only one of the earliest British house tunes (recorded 1986), but also as the first record to merge hip-hop and house, into a style known as hip house. This was followed up by "Beat Dis" by Bomb The Bass. The identity of Bomb The Bass was shrouded in mystery until it was revealed that it was the work of London's Wag Club DJ Tim Simenon, and record producer Pascal Gabriel. Simenon brought his DJ experience, record collection and techniques gained from a music production course to create a cut and paste style which, with Gabriel's help, successfully merged sounds and samples from various genres within dance music. These included old school hip hop, house, electro and funk with samples from film and TV - most notably The Good, the Bad and the Ugly and Thunderbirds. The record reputedly cost £500 to make and debuted at No. 5 in the UK Singles Chart in February 1988 - what was then the highest debut position for an unknown artist. It eventually reached No. 2 for two weeks and was kept off the top spot by Kylie Minogue's debut single "I Should Be So Lucky".

=== Theme From S-Express and further hits ===
Rhythm King did not have to wait too long for its first UK Singles Chart No. 1. S-Express was the brainchild of London DJ Mark Moore who, in collaboration with producer Pascal Gabriel (also in Bomb the Bass), put together the single, "Theme from S'Express". This mixed many of the contemporary dance music sounds of the time with a sample from Rose Royce's 1970s disco anthem "Is It Love You're After" to great success. Vocalist, David White aka Steam supplied vocals for the US release of the single. The single shot to No. 1 in April/May 1988 and 1988 to 1991 would be a golden period for Rhythm King with its artists - in particular The Beatmasters, Betty Boo, Bomb The Bass, Merlin and S-Express doing well in the UK Album and Singles Charts.

=== Outer Rhythm and Renegade Software ===
With rave culture going mainstream from the late 1980s, Rhythm King also became interested in this and formed Outer Rhythm in 1989. The emphasis at Outer Rhythm was electronic dance music/techno and was influential in developing the initial music careers of Leftfield and, to a much lesser degree, Moby. Briefly Outer Rhythm was also associated with Sheffield's Warp Records - and the Yorkshire Bleeps and Bass scene which launched Warp, along with Belgium based R&S Records before the labels and their artists - including Aphex Twin, CJ Bolland, Dave Angel, Jam & Spoon, LFO and Nightmares on Wax went on to do big things in their own right. Martin Heath also diversified into computer games software in association with the Bitmap Brothers. Renegade Software was successful and some of Rhythm King's artists - including The Beatmasters, Betty Boo, Bomb The Bass and Nation 12 contributed music to some of Renegade's titles.

=== Deal with Sony Records ===
The commercial success of Rhythm King enabled it to link a distribution deal with Sony Records subsidiary Epic Records. Rhythm King was no longer associated with Mute Records from 1991 and towards the end of 1992 it closed down the Outer Rhythm offshoot. Coincidentally, Mute set up Novamute Records around this time - also with a focus on techno and electronic dance music.

=== Direction of Rhythm King in the 1990s ===
As the 1990s progressed, many of the established artists on Rhythm King's roster - including Baby Ford, The Beatmasters, Betty Boo, Bomb The Bass, Leftfield, Moby and S-Express either left the label and/or concentrated on producing for other artists - most notably Tim Simenon and The Beatmasters, the latter in particular immediately achieving success with their work on a string of singles taken from the 1992 Shamen album, Boss Drum. The musical focus at Rhythm King in the mid-1990s shifted away from dance music and more towards indie and alternative rock. Acts signed during this period had varying levels of critical and commercial success, and included David Devant and his Spirit Wife, The Dharmas, Echobelly, Sheep on Drugs, The Sultans Of Ping and X-CNN.

=== Enter Arista exit Rhythm King ===
Rhythm King's distribution deal with Sony Records expired around 1995/96 so a new deal with BMG's Arista Records was signed in 1996. Rhythm King was subsequently closed down and merged into the main Arista concern when Martin Heath became head of the label. However, this was not the end of Heath's involvement with an independent record label. Lizard King Records was formed by Heath and Dominic Hardisty in 2001, and its most notable artist was US act The Killers, who were signed to Lizard King in the UK and Ireland. In 2005, Hardisty bought out Heath and Heath moved to New York to set up a new label. As part of the deal he was permitted to re-use the name Lizard King, but the Killers remain signed to the original company which has now been renamed Marrakesh Records.

== Artists ==
Rhythm King had a varied roster of artists. Some of these had only a short-term relationship with the label and others had more of a longer-term relationship releasing a number of singles and albums to varying degrees of commercial and critical success. The artist roster for the label therefore included the following:

- Ability 2 - Released on the Outer Rhythm offshoot.
- Aphex Twin - The releases Digeridoo and Selected Ambient Works 85-92 were released by Belgium-based R&S Records who had a distribution deal with Outer Rhythm for UK releases from 1990 to 1992.
- Baby Ford - The third Baby Ford album BFORD9 was released on Rhythm King's offshoot label Transglobal. Since leaving Rhythm King in the mid-1990s Peter Ford has had a nomadic relationship with a variety of other labels including; Black Market International, Force Inc, Ideal, Klang, Perlon, Plus 8 & Sender.
- Bailey & Bridges
- Bam Bam Musique - Released on the Splish offshoot label.
- The Beatmasters - After seven singles and two Rhythm King albums (Anywayawanna and Life & Soul), slimmed down to a duo and went on to a successful career as writers and producers. Still working to this day (2009)
- Joey Beltram - UK releases from 1990 to 1992 were distributed by Outer Rhythm on behalf of Belgium-based R&S Records. Recorded under the aliases Beltram and Second Phase.
- Betty Boo - Signed with WEA in 1992.
- Bomb The Bass - Formed the label Stoned Heights in association with Island Records offshoot 4th & Broadway in 1994.
- CCP - Released on Transglobal. Signed with MCA Records in 1989.
- Chuck Brown & The Soul Searchers - Some releases on the Flame offshoot.
- CJ Bolland - UK releases from 1990 to 1992 were distributed by Outer Rhythm on behalf of Belgium-based R&S Records.
- Congress - Released on the offshoot Inner Rhythm label.
- Cookie Crew - Released the single Females before signing with FFRR/London Records in 1988.
- D'Angel/Dave Angel - UK releases from 1990 to 1992 were distributed by Outer Rhythm on behalf of Belgium-based R&S Records.
- David Devant and his Spirit Wife
- The Dharmas - Now named Steadman after frontman Simon Steadman. The band allow fans to download their music for free downloads on their website under a Creative Commons licence.
- Djum Djum - (Neil Cole) Pianist, keyboardist, drummer/percussionist, vocalist and songwriter, co-wrote and co-produced Difference in 1990 (cat no. FOOT 8) with Neil Barnes, prior to the formation of Leftfield (see below). Released on Outer Rhythm. Difference (Djum Djum/Barnes) also featured on the Leftfield compilation album Backlog. July 1995 saw the Leftfield/Djum Djum collaboration Afro Left (Leftism), released through Sony.
- Dr Fresh
- Echobelly - Released on the offshoot Favue label.
- Fat Planet
- Thomas Fehlmann - aka Readymade, released on Transglobal.
- Fluffy Toy I.Q. - Released on Splish.
- Forgemasters - On Warp distributed by Outer Rhythm 1989–91.
- Hard Corps
- Heaven WXI
- Hotline
- How II House - Released on Outer Rhythm.
- Human Resource - UK releases from 1990 to 1992 were distributed by Outer Rhythm on behalf of Belgium-based R&S Records.
- Ital Rockers - Released on Outer Rhythm.
- Jam & Spoon - UK releases from 1990 to 1992 were distributed by Outer Rhythm on behalf of Belgium-based R&S Records.
- Jaydee - UK releases from 1990 to 1992 were distributed by Outer Rhythm on behalf of Belgium-based R&S Records.
- Joi - Released on Transglobal.
- KDFM - Released on Transglobal.
- King Sun D-Moet - Some releases on the Flame offshoot.
- Leftfield - The singles "Not Forgotten" and "More Than I Know" along with a compilation album Backlog were released on Outer Rhythm before Leftfield formed their own label Hard Hands in 1992. Since 1993 this was in association with Sony Music.
- Les Négresses Vertes
- LFO - On Warp distributed by Outer Rhythm 1989–91.
- Man Machine - Early 1990s techno/electro project on Outer Rhythm from Ed Stratton. Stratton was also a member of Jack 'N' Chill best remembered for their 'one-off' top-ten hit, The Jack That House Built which reached number 6 in the UK singles chart in January 1988. Stratton is also co-founder of Zero-G Ltd (formerly "Time+Space").
- Gwen McRae - Some releases on the Flame offshoot.
- Merlin - Signed with WEA in 1991/92.
- Moby - Moby's 1991 single Go was licensed by Outer Rhythm from New York-based Instinct Records. In 1992 Moby signed to Mute Records in the UK.
- Denise Motto
- Nation 12 - A collaboration between John Foxx and Tim Simenon of Bomb The Bass
- Nightmares on Wax - On Warp distributed by Outer Rhythm 1989–91.
- Nitzer Ebb - The single Murderous was released on Transglobal in 1986. The band signed a long-term deal with Mute Records in the late 1980s.
- One Tribe - Released on the Inner Rhythm offshoot.
- Paradise
- Q-Pid Featuring Nikki Q
- Renegade Soundwave - Signed to Mute Records in 1988, after releasing their first 2 singles Kray Twins and Cocaine Sex on Rhythm King, having been spotted by Mudd Club DJ and S-Express main man Mark Moore.
- Kurt Rogers
- Robert & Tom Sanders - Released on the Flame offshoot.
- Schoolly D - Licensing agreement with Jive Records for UK releases from 1986 to 1988. Some releases on the Flame offshoot.
- S-Express - aka S'Xpress. Mark Moore continues to produce music and is an Internationally known DJ.
- Shawnie 'G'
- She Rockers - Signed with Jive Records in late 1988.
- Sheep on Drugs - Released on Transglobal.
- Sludge Nation
- Jay Strongman "East West" single that sampled Red Army Choir.
- Sugar Ray Dinkie
- Sulphur (3) - Released on Transglobal.
- The Sultans Of Ping FC
- Survival Instinct - Released on Outer Rhythm.
- Sweet Exorcist - On Warp Distributed by Outer Rhythm 1989–91.
- Taffy - Released on Transglobal.
- Tanya
- Toney Rome
- Three Wise Men - aka Three Wize Men.
- Tiziana - Released on Splish.
- Tricky Disco - On Warp Distributed by Outer Rhythm 1989–91.
- Ugly - Which featured Glenn Gregory of Heaven 17.
- Underground Resistance - Released on Splish.
- Leslie Winer © - With Karl Bonnie, Jah Wobble, Kevin Mooney, Helen Terry, John Reynolds, Matthew Ashman and Marco Pirroni.
- Vice - aka Survival Instinct, released on Outer Rhythm.
- Victim Of The Ghetto
- Viola Wills
- Wolfman - Released on Splish.
- X-CNN - The band were originally called CNN but had to change their name to X-CNN after legal action from the television news channel. The line-up featured ex-All About Eve/Sisters of Mercy member Tim Bricheno on guitar and David Tomlinson on vocals. Released through Transglobal.
- YBU - Released on Splish.

== See also ==
- List of record labels
