= Afro-Left =

- CD single cover

Single by Leftfield featuring Djum Djum

from the album Leftism
- Released: 24 July 1995
- Recorded: Rollover Studios, London
- Genre: Techno, progressive house
- Length: 7:32
- Label: Hard Hands/Chrysalis
- Songwriters: Neil Barnes, Paul Daley, Neil Cole
- Producer: Leftfield

Leftfield featuring Djum Djum singles chronology
"Original" (1995)	"Afro-Left" (1995)	"Release the Pressure" (1996)

"Afro-Left" is a song by the English electronic duo Leftfield, released as their seventh single. The song was released on 12", CD and cassette on 24 July 1995 by Hard Hands/Chrysalis. It featured Neil Cole (as Djum Djum) on vocals, and it was rumoured that the lyrics were in an unspecified African language; it was later revealed that they were simply gibberish, or "Djum Djum talk". The song reached #22 in the UK charts.

The B-side "Afro Ride", a remix of "Afro-Left", was used in the 1995 game wipE'out".

== Critical reception ==
David Bennun from Melody Maker found that "Afro-Left" "turns a spoken African vocal into music, takes words without meaning, and infuses them with virtual melody. It's so original, so brilliantly conceived and mellifluously executed that it's almost shocking when you first hear it." Pan-European magazine Music & Media wrote, "Centrefielder Djum Djum adds the Afro flavour to the "intellectual dance" with his typically African diction. All four mixes will hit clubs and specialist radio shows like a homerun."

Roger Morton from NME stated that the track "adds Brazilian percussion and African scatting to a Moroder-esque throb and still hits home on the dancefloor." Another NME editor, David Quantick, commented, "Alas, 'Afro Left' substitutes — no doubt intentionally — thrilling thumping electronics for a kind of idle stop about, neatly accompanying the sampled vocal of a bloke talking to himself in an African language. It thrills not, neither does it entertain." The magazine's Andy Crysell was more positive, naming it one of the "highlights" of the album.

== Track listing ==
- 12" #1
1. "Afro Ride" — 9:10
2. "Afro Sol" — 6:02
3. "Afro Central" — 7:43
- 12" #2
1. "Afro Left" — 7:32
2. "Afro Ride" — 9:10
3. "Afro Sol" — 6:02
- 12" EP
1. "Afro Sol" — 6:02
2. "Afro Ride" — 9:10
3. "Afro Central" — 7:43
4. "Afro Left" — 7:32
- CD
1. "Afro Left" — 7:32
2. "Afro Ride" — 9:10
3. "Afro Sol" — 6:02
4. "Afro Central" — 7:43
- Australian CD
1. "Afro Left" (Edit) — 4:43
2. "Afro Left" — 7:32
3. "Afro Ride" — 9:10
4. "Afro Sol" — 6:02
5. "Afro Central" — 7:43

== Charts ==
Chart (1995)	Peak position
UK Singles (OCC)	22
