= Leftism (album) =

1995 studio album by Leftfield

Studio album by Leftfield
- Released: 30 January 1995
- Recorded: 1992–1995
- Studio: Rollover Studios, London
- Genre: Progressive house
- Length: 69:37
- Label: Columbia
- Producer: Leftfield

Leftfield chronology
Backlog (1992)	Leftism (1995)	Rhythm and Stealth (1999)

Singles from Leftfield
- 1. "Song of Life" Released: 30 November 1992; 2. "Open Up" Released: 1 November 1993; 3. "Original" Released: 13 March 1995; 4. "Afro-Left" Released: 24 July 1995; 5. "Release the Pressure" Released: 8 January 1996

Leftism is the debut studio album by English electronic music duo Leftfield, released in 1995 on Columbia Records. It contained a mixture of new tracks along with reworked versions of previous Leftfield singles. The album contains guest spots from musicians not associated with dance music at the time such as John Lydon from Public Image Ltd. (and formerly of Sex Pistols) and Toni Halliday from Curve. The album was described as progressive house, although some journalists found that label too limiting, suggesting the album incorporated many genres. After completing the album, the duo initially were not pleased with it.

On its release, the album was well received from the British press with positive reviews from the NME and Q. The album was nominated for the Mercury Prize in 1995 but lost to Portishead's Dummy. Leftism sold well and was released months later in the United States. Critics have praised the album as one of the major album-length works of dance music, with Q referring to it as "the first truly complete album experience to be created by house musicians and the first quintessentially British one".

== Production ==
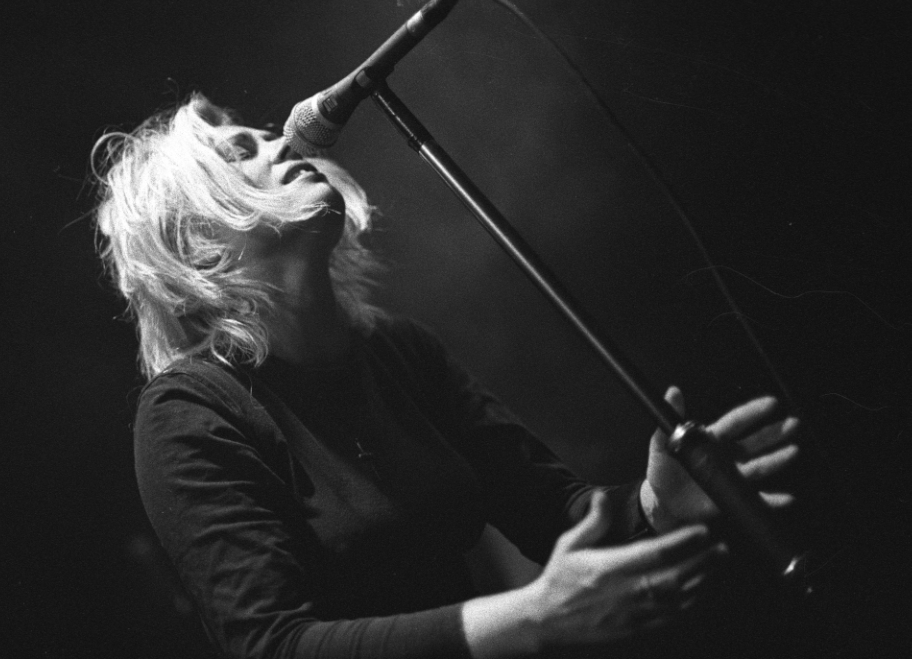
Toni Halliday (pictured in 1995) provided guest vocals on the song "Original".

Leftism is an album that consists of singles recorded previously by members Paul Daley and Neil Barnes between 1992 and 1995, with the exception of the single "Not Forgotten" which is not included, and other new tracks. These earlier singles included "Release the Pressure", "Song of Life", and "Open Up". Some of these singles were remade and changed drastically from their original versions for Leftism. Barnes stated that "rethinking and re-recording a few of our older tracks put us on the right road."

Barnes chose the guest vocalists who were not associated with dance music, as he "love[s] taking people with nothing to do with dance music, like Toni, or Danny Red, and putting them in a different environment, It's getting back to the original ethic of remixing, taking anything and turning it into dance music." Barnes was a fan of the group Curve, and had lead singer Toni Halliday come in and work on the song "Original". "Open Up" features John Lydon on vocals. Neil Barnes stated he had known Lydon since he was 19 years old through a mutual friend. Leftfield wanted to do a track with Lydon for about two years but were held up as "it took all that time to get him to commit to doing it and to get the track good enough." Two reggae vocalists are featured on the album; Danny Red on "Inspection" and Earl Sixteen on "Release the Pressure". Lemn Sissay guests on "21st Century Poem".

After completing the production on Leftism, Rob Daley was unhappy with how the album turned out stating that "It sounded shit [...] It seemed to have no cohesion, the tracks just didn't seem to hang well together. But having lived with it for a while it sounds much better." Paul Daley echoed these statements saying "We did all the tracks, listened to them and decided it sounded a fucking mess [...] we went back, messed around with the running order and chopped a lot of things out. Hopefully now it sounds complete, something that can be listened to in one go."

== Style ==
John Bush of the online music database AllMusic stated the album is not simply a progressive house album and that it "spans a wide range of influences (tribal, dub, trance)". Clash expanded on this, describing "Release the Pressure" and "Inspection (Check One)" as dub-influenced tracks, while "Storm 3000" is a bass-heavy track that includes jungle rhythms. Q described "Original" as a "sultry rock / electro fusion" A review in Slant Magazine commented that "Leftism eschews mainstream categorization and manages to reside in the leftfield of almost all the electronic genres it propagates".

== Release ==
Leftism was released on 30 January 1995 in the United Kingdom by Columbia Records. In the United States, it was released on 15 August. The single "Open Up" peaked at number 13 on the UK singles charts. "Afro-Left" peaked at number 20 on the US Club Play Singles chart in 1995. Leftism sold over 220,000 copies.

On 5 May 2017, the band released Leftism 22, with a remastered album as well a bonus disc of remixes by current artists, including Adrian Sherwood.

== Reception ==
Professional ratings
Aggregate scores
Source	Rating
Metacritic	89/100 (reissue)
Review scores
Source	Rating
AllMusic	5/5 stars
The Guardian	3/4 stars
Mixmag	10/10
Mojo	5/5 stars
NME	9/10
Q	4/5 stars
Record Collector	4/5 stars
Select	5/5
Uncut	8/10
Vox	9/10

Leftism was nominated for the Mercury Prize in 1995, but lost to Portishead's Dummy. Mixmag praised the singles for Leftism, stating that "classics like 'Release The Pressure' and 'Song of Life' were the cement that welded a whole new British house scene together. London proudly joined the league of house capitals. British dance music has never looked back." The NME praised the album as helping keep British house music alive "when the boffins were getting complacent, the junglists were lining their pockets and the trip-hoppers were muscling in, Leftfield have returned to save the night." The NME gave the album a nine out of ten, declaring that "there's a scope and spirit, an energy and a madness to 'Leftism' which'll make it one of the few dance derived that'll stay up there, bouncing around in the great echo chamber of futurity for years." Q awarded the album four stars out of five, stating that "Leftfield unleash some of the most thumping techno to be housed under a major label" and "On this evidence, Leftfield join Underworld, The Prodigy and Orbital as dance acts to prove themselves across an album."

Pitchfork's Paul Cooper, however, was dismissive of Leftism. In his 1999 review of the duo's follow-up Rhythm and Stealth, he stated that when Leftism was released "few could honestly say it was worth the wait" and "Had 'Open Up' and 'Release the Pressure' not been included in its track listing, it seems unlikely that anyone would be talking about Leftfield nowadays."

== Legacy ==
Later reviews of the album were generally positive. In 2000, Q gave a re-issue of the album four stars out of five, opining that "It's hard to overestimate the significance of Leftism, roundly acknowledged upon its release in 1995 as the first truly complete album experience to be created by house musicians and the first quintessentially British one." Q specifically praised the song "Open Up", describing it as having a "revolutionary fervour that once gripped dance, and that's missing from pretty much all pop music at the moment." In 2010, Clash praised the album, finding that it "remains a landmark in dance music. Perhaps the first successful, fully formed album from the genre, which remains a classic of the era and inspiration for many who followed." Exclaim! referred to the album positively in 1999, stating that Leftism is "regarded as a classic and highly influential dance album, its gleeful risk-taking and lovingly honed production certainly setting a standard for electronic music producers to aim for". The album was also included in the book 1001 Albums You Must Hear Before You Die. In 2000 it was voted number 59 in Colin Larkin's All Time Top 1000 Albums. In 2007, The Guardian included the album in their list of "1000 Albums to Hear Before You Die".

== Track listing ==
Leftism track listing
No.	Title	Writer(s)	Length
1.	"Release the Pressure"	Neil Barnes, Paul Daley, Earl Daley	7:39
2.	"Afro-Left"	Barnes, Daley, Djum Djum	7:33
3.	"Melt"	Barnes, Daley	5:21
4.	"Song of Life"	Barnes, Daley, Yanka Rupkina	6:55
5.	"Original"	Barnes, Daley, Toni Halliday	6:22
6.	"Black Flute"	Barnes, Daley	3:46
7.	"Space Shanty"	Barnes, Daley,	7:15
8.	"Inspection (Check One)"	Barnes, Daley, Daniel Clarke	6:30
9.	"Storm 3000"	Barnes, Daley,	5:44
10.	"Open Up"	Barnes, Daley, John Lydon	6:52
11.	"21st Century Poem"	Barnes, Daley	5:42
Total length:			69:37

Released in 1995 on CD, cassette and double vinyl. A limited edition triple vinyl version was also released at the same time, containing "Cut for Life" (7:09) (replacing "Song of Life"), "Half Past Dub" (3:38) and a longer version of "Open Up" (8:44). It was re-released in 2017.

=== 2000 double CD re-release ===
The second CD contains B-sides and remixes from the original singles, as well as "Cut for Life".

No.	Title	Writer(s)	Length
1.	"Afro-Ride"	Barnes, Daley, Cole	9:12
2.	"Release the Pressure (Release One)"	Barnes, Paul Daley, Earl Daley	7:21
3.	"Original (Live Dub)"	Barnes, Daley, Halliday	7:31
4.	"Filter Fish"	Barnes, Daley	7:41
5.	"Afro-Central"	Barnes, Daley, Cole	7:44
6.	"Release the Pressure (Release Four)"	Barnes, Paul Daley	5:02
7.	"Cut for Life"	Barnes, Daley, Rupkina	7:07

=== 2017 re-release ===
CD and digital contains eleven "brand new" remixes.

No.	Title	Remixer(s)	Length
12.	"Release the Pressure"	Adrian Sherwood	4:57
13.	"Afro-Left"	Hodge & Peverelist	6:21
14.	"Melt"	Quiet Village	7:49
15.	"Song of Life"	Bodyjack	8:51
16.	"Original"	Adesse Versions	7:03
17.	"Black Flute"	Ben Sims	8:19
18.	"Space Shanty"	Voiski	7:12
19.	"Inspection (Check One)"	Maafi	4:34
20.	"Storm 3000"	Dungeon Meat	5:33
21.	"Open Up"	Skream	7:35
22.	"21st Century Poem"	Zomby	4:52

== Personnel ==
=== Leftfield ===
- Neil Barnes – production, keyboards, guitar, drum programming
- Paul Daley – production, keyboards, mixing

=== Other musicians ===
- Earl Sixteen, Cheshire Cat, Papa Dee, Djum Djum, Toni Halliday, Danny Red, John Lydon, Lemn Sissay – vocals
- Kevin Hayes – berimbau
- Paul Solomons – mastering
- Adam Wren, Joe Gibb, Simon Duffy, Ollie Jacobs – engineering

== Charts ==
Chart performance for Leftism
Chart (1995–2023)	Peak position
Australian Albums (ARIA)	119
Belgian Albums (Ultratop Flanders)	160
Belgian Albums (Ultratop Wallonia)	126
Norwegian Albums (VG-lista)	27
New Zealand Albums (RMNZ)	32
Scottish Albums (OCC)	6
UK Albums (OCC)	3
