= Not Forgotten =

Not Forgotten may refer to:

- Not Forgotten (film), a 2009 American independent thriller
- Not Forgotten (novel), an original novel based on the U.S. television series Angel
- "Not Forgotten" (song), the first single released by the electronic group Leftfield
- Not Forgotten (TV series), a British television documentary series made by Wall to Wall for Channel 4
- Not Forgotten Association
- Not Forgotten, an Angel novel
