= Danny Red =

British-Jamaican musician (born 1967)

- Also known as: Danny Dread
- Born: Daniel Clarke; 24 February 1967 (age 59); London, England
- Genres: Reggae
- Years active: 1980–present
- Labels: Columbia, Cou$ins

Daniel Clarke (born c.1967), better known as Danny Red, is a British Jamaican reggae musician.

== Biography ==
Born in London to Jamaican parents, Clarke spent time as a child in Jamaica where he developed a love of reggae. In 1980 he began working on the London-based City Dread sound system as a deejay, and went on to join the Fine Style Crew. Clarke originally worked under the name Danny Dread, and released his first records and toured Europe with General Kelly under that name, but changed to Danny Red to avoid confusion with two other deejays who used that name. He began to concentrate on singing and by the early 1990s had established himself as a popular roots reggae singer.

Continuing success led to a contract with Columbia Records in 1994, Red becoming the first roots reggae artist signed by the label in over a decade. Columbia issued the Riddimwize album in 1994. The album included a track recorder Sly & Robbie, "Rolling Stone", which was a minor crossover hit.

In 1995 he was voted top Roots and Culture Artist by the British Reggae Industry, and supported Lucky Dube in UK shows.

More recently he has worked with Gussie P and Mafia & Fluxy.

Danny Red has contributed vocals to recordings by other artists, including the track "Inspection" on Leftfield's Leftism album.

== Discography ==
=== Albums ===
- I Don't Care (1993), Roots
- Riddimwize (1994), Columbia
- Past and Present (2008), Cou$ins
- Iteopian Rock (2008), Gussie P

=== Singles ===
- "Original Formula" (1991), Conscious Sounds
- "Armagideon" (1991), Nuff Tuff Music
- Riddim Wize EP (1993), Dredbeat - split EP with Sharp Slicks
- "Jah Is Here" (1993), Abba Jahnoi
- "Teaser" (1993), Dredbeat - Gospel Fish & Danny Red
- "Riddimwize" (1994), Columbia
- "Rise Up" (1995), Columbia
- "Rolling Stone" (1995), Columbia
- "Be Grateful" (1995), Columbia
- "The Final Fight" (199?), Conscious Melody
- "Give Jah Praise" (2005), Sip A Cup
- "Be Grateful" (2006), Cou$ins
- "Something Wrong" (2007), Cou$ins
- "Little More High Grade" (2008), Sip A Cup
- "Let I Live" (2009), High Steppers
- "It's Your Choice" (2009), King Shiloh
- "Jah Jah Me" (2011), Inner Sanctuary
- "Jahovah" (2012), Ababajahnoi
- "I See the Light" (2012), Ababajahnoi
- "Sha-La-La-La" (2012), King Shiloh
- "Dance Get Overload", RIZ
- "Jail House Rocking", Joe's Palace
- "I Can't Save Them", Conqueror - Danny Red and Vivian Jones
- "Rasta we rasta" (2014), Youth & Truth
