= Earth and Heaven =

Studio album by Repercussions
- Released: 1995
- Genre: Retro soul
- Label: Warner Bros.
- Producer: Gary Katz, Genji Siraisi, Daniel Wyatt, Repercussions

Repercussions chronology
Earth and Heaven (1995)	Charmed Life (1997)

Earth and Heaven is the debut album by the American band Repercussions, released in 1995. The album was recorded after the release of Groove Collective's debut album; the bands shared many members. The album was preceded by "Let's Do It Again", with Curtis Mayfield, which appeared on A Tribute to Curtis Mayfield.

== Production ==
The album was produced by Gary Katz, Genji Siraisi, Daniel Wyatt, and the band. Singer Nicole Willis wrote all of the lyrics to the songs.

Keyboardist Joe Sample, trumpetist Jerry Hay, and saxophonist Michael Blake performed on Earth and Heaven.

== Critical reception ==
Professional ratings
Review scores
Source	Rating
AllMusic	4/5 stars
The Buffalo News	3/5 stars
The Charlotte Observer	4/4 stars
Fort Worth Star-Telegram	3/5 stars
The Kingston Informer	5/10

The Pittsburgh Post-Gazette wrote: "A yuppie fantasy of different music and sterile lyrics, Earth and Heaven combines an electronic string section and an incredibly annoying wah-wah guitar to the tune of 10 excruciating tracks—none of which dares for the least bit of emotionalism." Trouser Press thought that, "by and large Earth and Heaven lacks the muscle, grit and energy of the Groove Collective album; it’s not much more than an ordinary retro-’70s soul record." The Record concluded that "Repercussions aren't all that distinctive—Soul II Soul, after all, was doing this kind of thing five years ago—but Earth and Heaven is never less than pleasant summer afternoon fare."

The Boston Globe opined that "singer Nicole Willis is a talented diva-in-waiting, a strong, soulful singer with commendable restraint." The Charlotte Observer determined that "the grooves are smooth as water running up on a sandy-white beach." The Buffalo News deemed the album "a strikingly bold mix of the big city club sound and the down to earth rhythm of blues that seem to underline the work of artists like Curtis Mayfield and Arrested Development."

AllMusic wrote that "this is cool, sexy soul that's pumped along by Genji Siraisi's clean drumming and Jonathan Maron's just-right bass work, led from the front by a nice vocal performance from Nicole Willis."

== Track listing ==
No.	Title	Length
1.	"Find Your Way"	4:05
2.	"Test of Time"	5:16
3.	"Turn Your Card"	4:24
4.	"Promise Me Nothing"	4:38
5.	"Slice of Heaven"	4:17
6.	"It's a New Day"	3:48
7.	"Keepin' It All Together"	4:45
8.	"Love Like the Sun"	6:04
9.	"A Gentle Kind of Love"	5:10
10.	"If There's a Question"	5:45
