= Open Up (Leftfield song) =

1993 single by Leftfield

Single by Leftfield featuring John Lydon

from the album Leftism
- Released: 1 November 1993
- Genre: Progressive house; alternative dance; dance-rock; electronica
- Length: 3:48
- Label: Hard Hands
- Songwriters: Leftfield; John Lydon
- Producer: Leftfield

Leftfield singles chronology
"Song of Life" (1993)	"Open Up" (1993)	"Original" (1995)

Music video
- "Open Up" on YouTube

Alternative Cover
- Alternative cover for South African release

"Open Up" is a song by British electronic duo Leftfield featuring John Lydon (of Sex Pistols and Public Image Ltd.). It was released as a single on 1 November 1993 by Hard Hands label. The single reached number 13 on the UK Singles Chart, number one on the Music Week Dance Singles chart and number 39 in both Australia and New Zealand. NME reported in their 18 September 1993 issue, "This is the record that people have always wanted Lydon to do." In 2014, the same publication ranked "Open Up" at number 444 on their list of the "500 Greatest Songs of All Time". A black-and-white music video was produced to promote the single, directed by British director Lindy Heymann.

"The Dust Brothers Remix" is an early remix by the Chemical Brothers, before they were forced to change to their current name. On later compilations, the remix appears as "The Chemical Brothers Remix" and is over nine minutes in duration (compared to eight minutes as first released). The longer version adds more than a minute of extra material around the 6–7-minute mark. The "I Hate Pink Floyd Mix" and the "Open Dub" were remixed by The Sabres of Paradise. The other 1993 versions are by Leftfield themselves.

== Critical reception ==
Caroline Sullivan from The Guardian wrote that Leftfield and Lydon "have produced a surprisingly excellent one-off single. Lydon is in finest misanthropic form, the subject of his ire his adopted home, Hollywood. He has discovered a lower register to offset his nasal bark; this, and LeftField's clattering technomatic beat make him sound positively sinister." In his weekly UK chart commentary, James Masterton described it as "a rather brilliant piece of dance with Lydon's customary snarling vocals adding to the effect quite brilliantly and giving him a bigger hit than PIL have managed since 'Rise' made No.11 in 1986." David Bennun from Melody Maker viewed it as "an incongruous but necessary arc of bile jetted in the face of positivity." Pan-European magazine Music & Media commented, "It's surprising to hear what Johnny Rotten can do to a '90s dance track, and impressive too. His classic voice works a thread of hysteria through a basically pumped track from Leftfield. A dark piece, well worth checking."

Andy Beevers from Music Week gave it a score of four out of five, adding, "The end result actually lives up to the hype, with Lydon's revitalised ranting carried along by a thumping trance production. It is certain to be a big specialist seller, and it could cross over if the tiny Hard Hands label plays its cards right." Sherman at the Controls from NME named it The Club Record the World Needs of the Week, while the magazine's Iestyn George named it Punk Rock Single of the Week, declaring it as Leftfield's "finest moment yet." Brad Beatnik from the Record Mirror Dance Update wrote, "This really is a remarkable record. The combination of Leftfield's deep, dubby rhythms and John Lydon's unique, crazed vocals is awesome. Imagine the pummelling insistency of 'Rez' combined with a near psychotic frenzied vocal and you'll be somewhere near the majesty of this track." Another Record Mirror editor, James Hamilton, noted, "Sex Pistol John Lydon quaveringly wails "burn, Hollywood, burn" (among other lyrics) through an actual quite Frankie Goes To Hollywood-like surging chugger".

== Impact and legacy ==
"Open Up" was nominated in the category for Tune of the Year at the International Dance Awards 1995. In 2014, NME ranked it number 444 in their list of the "500 Greatest Songs of All Time". In February 2022, Classic Pop ranked "Open Up" number 38 in their list of the top 40 dance tracks from the 90's.

== Track listings ==
- UK and Australian CD and cassette single
1. "Open Up" (radio edit)
2. "Open Up" (full vocal mix)
3. "Open Up" (Dervish Overdrive)
- UK and German 12-inch single

A. "Open Up" (full vocal mix) – 8:46
B. "Open Up" (Dervish Overdrive) – 6:47

- UK remix 12-inch single

A1. "Open Up" (I Hate Pink Floyd mix)
A2. "Open Up" (open dub)
B1. "Open Up" (The Dust Brothers remix)

- Swedish CD single
1. "Open Up" (radio edit)
2. "Open Up" (full vocal mix)

== Charts ==
Chart (1993–1994)	Peak position
Australia (ARIA)	39
Europe (Eurochart Hot 100)	32
Finland (Suomen virallinen lista)	5
Israel (Israeli Singles Chart)	27
New Zealand (Recorded Music NZ)	39
UK Singles (Official Charts)	13
UK Airplay (Music Week)	25
UK Dance (Music Week)	1
UK Club Chart (Music Week)	10

== Release history ==
Region	Date	Format(s)	Label(s)	Ref.
United Kingdom	1 November 1993	12-inch vinyl; CD; cassette	Hard Hands	
Australia	6 December 1993	CD; cassette	Liberation; Hard Hands	
