= Go (1999 film) =

1999 film by Doug Liman

- Theatrical release poster
- Directed by: Doug Liman
- Written by: John August
- Produced by: Paul Rosenberg; Mickey Liddell; Matt Freeman
- Starring: William Fichtner; Katie Holmes; Jay Mohr; Sarah Polley; Scott Wolf; J. E. Freeman; Breckin Meyer; Timothy Olyphant
- Cinematography: Doug Liman
- Edited by: Stephen Mirrione
- Music by: BT
- Production companies: Banner Entertainment; Saratoga Entertainment
- Distributed by: Columbia Pictures (through Sony Pictures Releasing)
- Release date: April 9, 1999
- Running time: 102 minutes
- Country: United States
- Language: English
- Budget: $20 million
- Box office: $28.5 million

Go is a 1999 American crime comedy film written by John August and directed by Doug Liman, with intertwining plots involving three sets of characters. The film stars William Fichtner, Katie Holmes, Jay Mohr, Sarah Polley, Scott Wolf, J. E. Freeman, Breckin Meyer and Timothy Olyphant.

Grocery store clerk Ronna is facing eviction, so must come up money fast. At work, two actors proposition her for drugs. Ronna plans to score drugs and sell them at a higher price for the money. Caught up in a sting, she disposes of the drugs, then must recoup her losses, so exchanges allergy pills for the drugs. From here, three wild and amusing stories intertwine.

The film underperformed at the box office but was critically acclaimed.

== Plot ==
Around Christmas, Ronna, working overtime at her supermarket job to avoid being evicted, is approached by Adam and Zack to buy 20 ecstasy pills, which they had hoped to buy from her absent co-worker, Simon.

After work, Ronna visits Simon's dealer, Todd, for the pills. Unable to pay the full amount, she leaves her friend Claire with him as collateral. Ronna meets with Adam and Zack but grows suspicious of Burke, a stranger accompanying them who presses her for the ecstasy.

Ronna flushes the drugs down the toilet and leaves, then steals over-the-counter pills to replace them. She is helped by Manny, who had covertly swallowed two of the ecstasy pills, unaware of their strength. Ronna gives 20 of the fake pills to Todd. She, Claire, and Manny then attend a rave where she sells the rest of the fake pills as ecstasy.

Todd realizes the pills are fake and pursues Ronna to the rave. Ronna flees, hiding the now incapacitated Manny in an alley and promising to return with her car. Todd confronts her with a gun in the parking lot when she is hit by a car that speeds away, leaving her motionless in a ditch.

The story restarts from the perspective of Simon, who is on a trip to Las Vegas with Marcus, Tiny, and Singh. Simon crashes a wedding and has sex with two of the bridesmaids before they accidentally set their hotel room on fire. Simon and Marcus leave the hotel, stealing a Ferrari whose owner mistakes Marcus for a parking valet.

The two go to a strip club where Simon enrages the bouncer, Victor Jr., by groping one of the strippers. Simon shoots Victor Jr. in the arm with a gun that he found in the car. He and Marcus flee to the hotel, rousing Tiny and Singh. A car chase ensues and the four barely escape the bouncer and his father, Victor Sr., but the latter traces Todd's address from his credit card, which Simon had borrowed.

The story changes perspective to Adam and Zack, actors in a soap opera who are in a relationship with one another. Having been busted for drug possession, they are coerced into working for Burke, a police detective, to entrap their dealer. Adam is fitted with a wire. As Simon is absent, the two arrange to buy drugs from Ronna. When she arrives later to make the deal, Zack secretly warns her, so she flushes the drugs down the toilet and leaves.

After the unsuccessful bust, Burke invites Adam and Zack to Christmas dinner, where they observe strange behavior from Burke and his wife, Irene. Over dinner, the two pitch a multi-level marketing company to Adam and Zack. Discussing their mutual infidelities, the actors realize they both cheated with the same person, Jimmy, so confront him at the rave.

Leaving the rave, they accidentally hit Ronna, panic, and drive away when they see Todd with a gun. Zack tries to reassure Adam that, even if Ronna had survived, Todd would have shot her. Adam realizes to his horror that he is still wearing his wire. Fearing they have been recorded, the two return to the scene to remove Ronna's body but discover she is only unconscious. They prop her up on a car, setting off its alarm, and watch from a distance as other partygoers call an ambulance.

As morning breaks, Claire goes to a restaurant to meet with Ronna and Manny but encounters Todd instead. The two end up going to Todd's apartment building. While making out on the stairs, they are confronted by the two Victors. Simon arrives, having hoped to hide for a few days. The ensuing scuffle is stopped by Claire, who refuses to witness a murder.

Simon agrees to be shot in the arm by Victor Jr. as Claire leaves in disgust. Meanwhile, Ronna wakes up in a hospital and hobbles to the supermarket to start work. Realizing she left Manny at the rave, she and Claire return to the venue to find him, pale and shaking in the alley. The three go to Ronna's car where Ronna muses that she can now pay her rent and Manny asks what their plans are for New Year's.

== Cast ==
- Desmond Askew as Simon Baines
- Taye Diggs as Marcus
- William Fichtner as Burke Halverson
- J. E. Freeman as Victor Sr.
- Katie Holmes as Claire Montgomery
- Jane Krakowski as Irene Halverson
- Breckin Meyer as "Tiny"
- Jay Mohr as Zack
- Timothy Olyphant as Todd Gaines
- Sarah Polley as Ronna Martin
- Scott Wolf as Adam
- James Duval as Singh
- Nathan Bexton as Manny
- Jimmy Shubert as Victor Jr.
- Suzanne Krull as Stringy Haired Woman
- Robert Peters as Switterman
- Tony Denman as Track Suit Guy
- Natasha Melnick as Anorexic Girl
- Manu Intiraymi as Skate Punk Guy
- Nikki Fritz as Noelle
- Tané McClure as Holly
- Melissa McCarthy as Sandra

== Production ==
=== Development ===
After director Doug Liman's 1996 film Swingers had been a success, he was asked to direct the film Heartbreakers (later directed instead by David Mirkin). After watching Swingers, screenwriter John August felt Liman would be the perfect fit for Go, and producer Mickey Liddell pitched it to him. Liman felt Heartbreakers was too big-budget for a comedy, though his agent urged him to take the bigger studio film. Go had a proposed budget of around one-fifth of Heartbreakers', but he liked what he considered a more difficult indie film and chose to sign on to Go.

=== Writing ===
August originally wrote the portion of the story involving Ronna as a short film titled X, inspired by the "Rock 'n' Roll Ralphs" grocery store on Sunset Boulevard. After friends asked about Simon's trip to Vegas, and what was going on with Adam and Zack, he wrote two more parts, accounting for the nature of the film. By 1998, August had been hired only as a script doctor: "I was really fortunate to be getting those jobs, but I was only being considered for movies involving gnomes, elves, dwarves, and Christmas."

When August began shopping Go, big film studios were still buying spec scripts. He wanted to show them a versatile script, which would display what he was capable of. They could sell it as an action movie, a black comedy, a thriller, or however they wanted to market it.

In 1989 and 1994, Jim Jarmusch's Mystery Train and Quentin Tarantino's Pulp Fiction popularized the concept of shooting one story from various points of view. August explained, "The idea of restarting your movie was fine; it wasn't just an experimental art-film kind of thing. It was a thing that people could have said, 'Oh, it's like that.' The 'Oh, it's like that' has sort of been a blessing and a curse. It made it possible to make [Go], but also made it really easy to dismiss the film or to dismiss that gimmick as 'Pulp Fiction did it first'." Switching from the working title X, August integrated the command "Go!" several times (as well as "Stop!") into the script's dialogue, each time in a different context, to create urgency as a suspenseful night worsens into a violent day. The characters' dialogue is laden with sarcastic rhetorical questions, casual profanities, and pop-cultural references.

=== Filming ===
To save time and prevent continuity issues, the screenplay was fixed so that each segment begins with Ronna's job at the supermarket. Liman committed to guerrilla filmmaking, holding a handheld camera on his shoulder to shoot while dashing from location to location, and occasionally used public places where he did not have filming permits. Often improvising, Liman demanded overtime from cast and crew, which he provided.

=== Casting ===
Joseph Middleton was hired as the casting director. No actor had been attached to the film yet, so Middleton was free to contact the actors he wanted and the script was passed around among agents. Breckin Meyer stated the competition among young actors was fierce. "'We all like this thing. I wonder who's going to get it?' With Go, everyone knew it was a very cool script." Scott Wolf said, "The script was incredibly good. There was a lot of conversation about it."

Originally, August pictured Ronna as African American, but Sarah Polley's performance in Atom Egoyan's film The Sweet Hereafter convinced Liman that she was right for the part. Polley, who resides in Canada, was offered the role directly, without auditioning; Christina Ricci was also considered in case Polley was not available. Polley declined the role several times before accepting it, as she was interested in more "serious" dramas, but was ultimately won over by Liman's vision.

Middleton had seen Taye Diggs in the musical Rent, so Liman flew to New York to meet him and discuss the part of Simon's friend. Katie Holmes had shot only the pilot for Dawson's Creek, which would become her big break, but she had appeared in The Ice Storm and Middleton asked her to play Ronna's less confident coworker, Claire. Timothy Olyphant auditioned for the role of either Zack or Adam and ended up with the role of drug dealer Todd Gaines. Olyphant was a late addition; he was about to shoot the film Practical Magic but was fired from his role and replaced by Aidan Quinn, enabling him to join the cast as Todd.

Actress Jennifer Coolidge urged Middleton to cast Melissa McCarthy in her first film role as Sandra. McCarthy said she was a student at the time, while Coolidge was a member of the Groundlings. "I didn't know she knew I was alive — and [Coolidge] said, 'I think you should see this girl.'" Middleton told McCarthy, "She doesn't do that, ever."

Although Liman found the process "grueling," the producers felt lucky to find a new generation of young actors transitioning from teen films to more adult material. Go launched several big careers, actors, crew, and studio executives . Polley credits Go for later becoming a director, saying it happened as a result of a lunch meeting with Liman. She wasn't yet sure she wanted to act, and Liman hadn't even read the script. As a result of watching August and Liman collaborating, she was convinced to become a filmmaker.

=== Financing ===
Banner Entertainment decided to package Go as an independent feature with a $3.5 million budget and to bring August on as a co-producer who would be on set every day.

When Go was about to start shooting, its foreign financing fell through because the film lacked a "bankable white male star." Columbia Pictures stepped in and financed the film. As most of the plot takes place at night, August recalled being "outside in the dark from 8 p.m. until 8 a.m. for 25 days" during filming.

The producers told Liman that the car chase on the Las Vegas Strip in the second act would have to be cut for budgetary reasons. He instead dedicated almost a third of his budget to the scene and scrimped in other ways for the rest of the film. With Sony involved, the budget was raised to about $5 million. Liman sped up the production until everyone was exhausted and acted as his own cinematographer.

== Soundtrack ==
No.	Title	Artist(s)	Length
1.	"New"	No Doubt	4:13
2.	"Steal My Sunshine"	Len	4:08
3.	"Magic Carpet Ride" (Steir's mix)	Philip Steir featuring Steppenwolf	3:25
4.	"Troubled by the Way We Came Together"	Natalie Imbruglia	3:50
5.	"Gangster Trippin'"	Fatboy Slim	5:19
6.	"Cha Cha Cha" (Go remix)	Jimmy Luxury & The Tommy Rome Orchestra	3:27
7.	"Song for Holly"	Esthero with Danny Saber	4:06
8.	"Fire Up the Shoesaw" (LP version)	Lionrock	5:43
9.	"To All the Lovely Ladies" (radio mix)	Goldo	3:14
10.	"Good to Be Alive"	DJ Rap	4:15
11.	"Believer"	BT	5:11
12.	"Shooting Up in Vain" (T-Ray remix)	Eagle-Eye Cherry	4:51
13.	"Talisman"	Air (credited as Air French Band)	4:16
14.	"Swords"	Leftfield featuring Nicole Willis	7:17

== Reception ==
=== Box office ===
Go grossed $16.9 million domestically (United States and Canada), and $11.5 million in other territories, for a worldwide total of $28.5 million, against a budget of $20 million. It spent its first four weeks in the Top 10 at the domestic box office.

=== Critical response ===
On the review aggregator website Rotten Tomatoes, 91% of 77 critics' reviews are positive, with an average rating of 7.6/10. The website's consensus reads: "With its sharp dialogue and raucous visuals, Go entertains at an exhilarating pace." Metacritic, which uses a weighted average, assigned the film a score of 74 out of 100, based on 29 critics, indicating "generally favorable" reviews. Audiences polled by CinemaScore gave the film a grade B on scale of A to F.

Roger Ebert of the Chicago Sun-Times stated that "Go is an entertaining, clever black comedy that takes place entirely in Tarantino-land.... Go has energy and wit, and the performances are right for the material – especially Sarah Polley, who thinks fast and survives harrowing experiences, and Fichtner, the cop who is so remarkably open to new experiences." Janet Maslin of The New York Times praised the performances of Olyphant and Fichtner, as well as Go's energy and Liman's direction: "Artfully executed druggy flights of fancy include a hallucinatory macarena in a supermarket, a mind-reading black cat and a smart visual approximation of how it feels to be on the verge of throwing up. Here and elsewhere, Mr. Liman manipulates speed, light, editing and point of view vigorously and keeps the radio humming. He creates a film that lives up to the momentum of its title and doesn't really need much more."

Many of the reviews were mixed. Todd McCarthy stated in Variety, "Go is an overly calculated concoction that nonetheless delivers a pretty good rush." David Anson wrote in Newsweek, "Clever as the parts are, it doesn't add up to much. Go has its pleasures, but I didn't really believe a word of it." Peter Rainer's review for New York Magazine wrote, "Liman (Swingers) is a virtuoso talent with a knack for locating the pulse of a scene, and he’s good with actors – Sarah Polley, as a chicklet set up by a narc, is especially tart. But finally, there’s nothing much to this movie except a lot of funky attitude. Marc Savlov's review for The Austin Chronicle read "Relentless and mercurial, this new outing by "Swingers" director Liman takes off somewhere around Mach 3 and never lets up, leaving you with either a pounding headache or a wicked grin, or perhaps both.

Jeff Vice wrote in the Salt Lake City Journal, "The idea behind Go—showing the same event through several different perspectives—has been done before, of course—most famously in Pulp Fiction. But there are enough twists and turns this time around to make it worthwhile. But don't mistake this ensemble piece for a feel-good comedy. This is very rough stuff, in terms of story and content, which will put off a lot of audience members. And it's certainly not socially redeeming in any way. On the online review site Reel Views, James Berardinelli called the film "the latest piece of high-octane eye candy aimed squarely at members of the infamous Generation X. Fast-paced and often witty, but ultimately vapid."

In 2008, Joe Valdez of The Distracted Globe wrote, "Few titles have the finesse to sum up a movie as brilliantly as Go, a drug fueled rollercoaster ride that alternates between dark comedy and light suspense with terrific verve. The film's appeal lies in its modest scale and the fact that it was made mostly by starving artist types. ...Nearly everyone involved in the production was a relative unknown or newcomer. With no pressure to supply an entertainment to the masses, the writer, director and most of the actors deliver the best work of their careers." In 2014, Joe Reid of The Atlantic revisited Go on the 15th anniversary of its release. Reid noted that at the time it came out, it was seen as a "knock-off" of other 1990s films:

The split narrative style, complete with character title cards separating the film into thirds, put Go at the top of the list when it came to late '90s Tarantino influenced cinema. And then there was director Doug Liman, red hot off of the cult success of Swingers, trading neo swing culture for X and raves. (Both films would give a healthy chunk of attention to Vegas, though.) The thing about Go that sets it apart, however, is that it's COMPLETELY FANTASTIC. Energetic and quotable and stylish and neither overly enamored with nor overly dismissive of the culture it's inhabiting.

=== Accolades ===
Award	Category	Recipient(s)	Result	Ref.
ASCAP Film and Television Music Awards	Most Performed Songs from Motion Pictures	Gregg Diamond for the song "Steal My Sunshine"	Won	
Canadian Comedy Awards	Film – Performance – Female	Sarah Polley	Won	
Casting Society of America Awards	Best Casting for Feature Film, Drama	Joseph Middleton	Nominated	
Chlotrudis Awards	Best Actress	Sarah Polley	Nominated	
Deauville Film Festival	Grand Special Prize	Doug Liman	Nominated	
Independent Spirit Awards	Best Director	Doug Liman	Nominated	
Independent Spirit Awards	Best Supporting Female	Sarah Polley	Nominated	
National Board of Review Awards	Excellence in filmmaking recognition	Go	Won	
Teen Choice Awards	Choice Breakout Performance	Sarah Polley	Nominated	
Teen Choice Awards	Most Funniest Scene	Jay Mohr and Scott Wolf believe they're being seduced by a police officer who invited them to dinner	Nominated	
Young Hollywood Awards	Best Bad Boy	Timothy Olyphant	Won	

== In popular culture ==
The Simpsons episode "Trilogy of Error" is, according to the writers' commentary, based on this film.

== See also ==
- Loved Up (1995 film), a BBC TV drama exploring clubbing and drug culture
- Groove, a US film about rave culture released a year later
- Human Traffic, a UK film about rave culture released the same year
- Sorted, a UK film about trance culture released a year later
- South West 9, a UK drugs comedy
- Tarantinoesque film
