= This Is What We Do =

2022 studio album by Leftfield

Studio album by Leftfield
- Released: 2 December 2022
- Length: 56.06
- Label: Virgin
- Producer: Adam Wren; Neil Barnes

Leftfield chronology
Alternative Light Source (2015)	This Is What We Do (2022)	This Is What We Do. Version Excursion (2023)

Singles from This Is What We Do
- 1. "Pulse" Released: 27 July 2022; 2. "Accumulator" Released: 21 September 2022; 3. "Full Way Round" Released: 18 October 2022; 4. "Rapture 16" Released: 26 May 2023

Professional ratings
Aggregate scores
Source	Rating
Metacritic	77/100
Review scores
Source	Rating
The Arts Desk	4/5 stars
Evening Standard	4/5 stars
Hot Press	8/10
The Irish Times	4/5 stars
Mojo	4/5 stars
musicOMH	3.5/5 stars
The Observer	4/5 stars
Sputnikmusic	3.5/5
The Telegraph	4/5 stars
Uncut	7/10

This Is What We Do is the fourth studio album by English electronic group Leftfield. It was released on 2 December 2022 by Virgin Records. It is the band's first album in seven years, following the 2015 album Alternative Light Source. The album features appearances by Fontaines D.C. frontman Grian Chatten and poet Lemn Sissay.

== Background ==
The album was written during Neil Barnes' recovery from cancer. On 27 July 2022, Leftfield announced the release of their first album in seven years, along with the first single "Pulse". The second single "Accumulator" was released on 21 September 2022.

== Cover art ==
The album's cover art was photographed by American photographer Steve McCurry, and was "chosen to reflect the warmth and positivity of this musically eclectic and upbeat record as well as to celebrate the connections that we make with other throughout our lives."

== Critical reception ==
This Is What We Do was met with "generally favorable" reviews from critics. At Metacritic, which assigns a weighted average rating out of 100 to reviews from mainstream publications, this release received an average score of 77, based on 6 reviews.

The album reached number 7 in Scotland, and number 18 in the UK.

== Track listing ==
This Is What We Do track listing
No.	Title	Writer(s)	Length
1.	"This Is What We Do"	Neil Barnes; Adam Wren	4:51
2.	"Full Way Round" (featuring Grian Chatten)	Barnes; Wren	5:39
3.	"Making a Difference" (featuring Lemn Sissay)	Barnes; Wren	5:46
4.	"City of Synths"	Barnes; Wren	4:57
5.	"Pulse"	Barnes; Wren	5:58
6.	"Machines Like Me"	Barnes; Wren	4:35
7.	"Rapture 16" (featuring Earl Sixteen)	Barnes; Wren	4:11
8.	"Heart and Soul"	Barnes; Wren	5:39
9.	"Accumulator"	Barnes; Wren	6:18
10.	"Come On"	Barnes; Wren	2:55
11.	"Power of Listening"	Barnes; Wren	5:20
Total length:			56:06

== Charts ==
Chart performance for This Is What We Do
Chart (2022)	Peak position
Belgian Albums (Ultratop Wallonia)	124
Scottish Albums (OCC)	7
UK Albums (OCC)	18
UK Dance Albums (OCC)	1

This Is What We Do. Version Excursion

Remix album by Leftfield
- Released: 22 April 2023
- Genre: Electronica, dub music
- Length: 48:42
- Label: Virgin Music

Leftfield chronology
This Is What We Do (2022)	This Is What We Do. Version Excursion (2023)

== Remix version ==
In February 2023, Leftfield announced an album of dub remixes of the tracks from This Is What We Do entitled This Is What We Do. Version Excursion. The album was released on pink vinyl only in conjunction with Record Store Day on 22 April 2023. It was later released digitally on 9 June 2023.

=== Track listing ===
This Is What We Do. Version Excursion track listing
No.	Title	Length
1.	"We Do Dub"	4:23
2.	"Criss Cross Cabbie"	4:25
3.	"Citing and Fighting"	4:11
4.	"Synthetix"	4:28
5.	"Pulsating Dub"	4:49
6.	"Machines Like Dub"	3:56
7.	"Enraptured" (featuring Earl Sixteen)	4:26
8.	"Accumulator Dub"	5:12
9.	"Body + Soul" (Acid Flange Mix)	4:21
10.	"Coming On"	3:35
11.	"P.O.L Dub"	5:02
