= Alternative Light Source =

Studio album by Leftfield
- Released: 8 June 2015
- Genres: EDM; trip hop; tech house
- Length: 52:18
- Label: Infectious
- Producers: Neil Barnes, Adam Wren

Leftfield chronology
Rhythm and Stealth (1999)	Alternative Light Source (2015)	This Is What We Do (2022)

Professional ratings
Aggregate scores
Source	Rating
Metacritic	79/100
Review scores
Source	Rating
AllMusic	4/5 stars
Clash	8/10
The Guardian	4/5 stars
The Line of Best Fit	8.5/10
Mojo	4/5 stars
MusicOMH	4/5 stars
The Observer	4/5 stars
Record Collector	4/5 stars
Release Magazine	10/10
Uncut	4/5 stars

Alternative Light Source is the third album by the English electronic group Leftfield, released on 8 June 2015. It is the first new material following the band's 1999 album Rhythm and Stealth. It is also the first Leftfield album without Paul Daley, as well as the first since the band's return in 2010.

On 1 June 2015, the album premiere was streamed live on Leftfield's website, coupled with live tweeting about it on the band's Twitter feed with hashtag #leftfieldstream.

== Critical reception ==
Nick Annan of Clash said "Alternative Light Source is a worthy successor to Rhythm & Stealth, not as sparse or hard hitting but brimming with energy, ideas and familiar Leftfield diaphragm-rattling bass." Mojo's Stephen Worthy commented that Neil Barnes "meets the challenge" of releasing a followup to Leftfield's previous albums that went platinum, and said that the album, "...aided by a clutch of judicious guest appearances, balances crowd-pleasing festival epics, intense techy workouts and bubbling synth lullabies."

== Track listing ==
No.	Title	Length
1.	"Bad Radio" (featuring Tunde Adebimpe)	5:22
2.	"Universal Everything" (featuring Georgia Barnes)	7:06
3.	"Bilocation" (featuring Channy Leaneagh of Poliça)	4:24
4.	"Head and Shoulders" (featuring Sleaford Mods)	5:24
5.	"Dark Matters"	5:02
6.	"Little Fish" (featuring Channy Leaneagh of Poliça)	6:08
7.	"Storms End"	5:00
8.	"Alternative Light Source"	3:16
9.	"Shaker Obsession"	5:22
10.	"Levitate for You" (featuring Ofei)	5:14
Total length:		52:18

== Charts ==
Chart (2015)	Peak position
Australian Albums (ARIA)	42
Belgian Albums (Ultratop Flanders)	31
Belgian Albums (Ultratop Wallonia)	111
Dutch Albums (Album Top 100)	31
German Albums (Offizielle Top 100)	74
UK Albums (Official Charts)	6
