= Dusted (song) =

- Cover of UK CD1

Single by Leftfield featuring Roots Manuva

from the album Rhythm and Stealth
- Released: 15 November 1999
- Genre: Electronic; trip hop
- Length: 4:49
- Label: Hard Hands/Chrysalis Music
- Songwriter(s): Neil Barnes, Paul Daley and Rodney Smith
- Producer(s): Leftfield

Leftfield featuring Roots Manuva singles chronology
"Afrika Shox" (1999)	"Dusted" (1999)	"Swords" (2000)

"Dusted" is a song by the English electronic group Leftfield, released as the second single from 's the band's album Rhythm and Stealth. It was released on CD and 12" on 15 November 1999 on the Hard Hands record label, published by Chrysalis Music. The song reached number 28 on the UK Singles Chart. It features vocals by Roots Manuva, which were recorded in 1997, prior to his mainstream success as a solo artist.

== Music video ==
The music video for the song was released on the Studio !K7 compilation DVD, Extra: A Collection of Outstanding Electronic Music.

== Formats and track listings ==
=== CD1 ===
1. "Dusted" – 4:49
2. "Dusted" (Pressure Drop Remix) – 4:01
3. "Dusted" (Si Begg's Buckfunk 3000 Remix) – 5:44
4. "Dusted" (Howie B Instrumental Remix) – 3:51

=== CD2 ===
1. "Dusted" (X-ecutioners Remix) – 3:16
2. "Dusted" (Howie B Vocal Remix) – 5:46
3. "Dusted" (Tipper Remix) – 4:42

=== 12" ===
1. "Dusted" (Si Begg's Buckfunk 3000 Remix) – 5:44
2. "Dusted" (X-ecutioners Remix) – 3:16
3. "Dusted" (Pressure Drop Remix) – 4:01

=== European CD release ===
1. "Dusted" – 4:49
2. "Dusted" (Pressure Drop Remix) – 4:01
3. "Dusted" (Howie B Instrumental Remix) – 3:51
4. "Dusted" (X-ecutioners Remix) – 3:16
5. "Dusted" (Tipper Remix) – 4:42

=== US CD release ===
1. "Dusted" (Album Version) – 4:49
2. "Dusted" (Pressure Drop Remix) – 4:01
3. "Dusted" (Howie B Instrumental Remix) – 3:51
4. "Dusted" (The X-ecutioners Remix) – 3:16
5. "Dusted" (Tipper Remix) – 4:42
6. "Dusted" (Howie B Vocal Remix) – 5:46
7. "Dusted" (Si Begg's Buckfunk 3000 Remix) – 5:44

=== Australian CD release ===
1. "Dusted" (Album Version) – 4:49
2. "Dusted" (Pressure Drop Remix) – 4:01
3. "Dusted" (Howie B Vocal Remix) – 5:46
4. "Dusted" (X-ecutioners Remix) – 3:16
5. "Dusted" (Tipper Remix) – 4:42

== Charts ==
Chart performance for "Dusted"
Chart (1999–2000)	Peak position
Australia (ARIA)	79
UK Singles (OCC)	28
UK Dance (OCC)	4
