= Dave Angel =

- Born: David Angelico Nicholas Gooden; 13 May 1966 (age 59); Chelsea, London, England
- Genres: Techno, Brit-hop, hip house
- Years active: 1983–present
- Website: Dave Angel Facebook

Dave Angel (born David Angelico Nicholas Gooden; 13 May 1966) is an English techno musician. Angel was born in Chelsea, London, England. He is the son of a London-based jazz musician, and the elder brother of rapper Monie Love. He had an unorthodox musical education; his father influenced him deeply, as did his friends and his environment, including the radio. He listened not only to Miles Davis and Charlie Parker, but also to soul music and funk. Even though he was playing instruments at 14 years old, including percussion, his musical development was not easy or straightforward.

== Career ==
His musical career started when he borrowed an old electronic keyboard from a friend and, using a double tape deck, assembled a bassline and drum track, over which he laid "Sweet Dreams (Are Made of This)" by Eurythmics. He called the result his Nightmare mix, and borrowed money from a friend to press 500 copies. When BMG, and thus the Eurythmics, learnt of this, Annie Lennox wanted to prevent the sale of what was in effect an unlicensed version of their song; however, her partner Dave Stewart liked the mix, and persuaded her to allow Angel to go ahead. The track, involving elements of jazz, Detroit techno and breakbeat hardcore, was successful, reaching number 23 on the UK Singles Chart.

Not long afterwards, Angel received many invitations, and gained much respect from European artists, becoming part of the Phaze One team together with the drum & bass DJs Fabio and Grooverider (who used to play styles from house to hardcore at that time). The doors were also opened for his career as a producer. Despite the quality of his productions, however, such as the EPs "The Family" by Apollo and "Royal Techno" by Rotation Records, he was unable to make much impression in England. Through his label, Rotation Records, he gave opportunities to many of the current producers, including many of other nationalities, such as Paul Hazel, Cisco Ferreira, Vince Watson, Samuel L. Session, Steve Rachmad, and Sharpside.

He released tracks for labels such as Black Market, Love, Rotation, and specially the Belgian R&S Records. 1995 saw the release through Studio !K7 of his CD "X-Mix-4 – Beyond The Heavens", which included songs from all over the world such as Chez Damier's "Help Myself", F2's "Dominica" and his remix for Sun Electric's "Entrance." The second half of the 1990s brought Angel closer to funk than jazz when he released tracks from the LP Globetrotting, such as "Tokyo Stealth Fighter", "This is Disco", and "Funk Music". Over the years that followed, he gained a central position on the international scene, making appearances at the biggest events and festivals; he plays all over the world, and has become an important figure in international techno. Angel is the father of UK rapper Fabien Darcy.

== Discography ==
=== Albums ===
- Tales of the Unexpected (1995), Blunted
- Globetrotting (1997), 4th & Broadway
- Frame by Frame Remixes (2011), Plaza in Crowd

=== Compilations ===
- Classics (1996), R&S Records
- 16 Flavours of Tech Funk (1998), React
- DA02: The Reworks Album (2002), Trust the DJ

=== Singles and EPs ===
Eurythmics / Angel* – Angel / Sweet Dreams (Nightmare Mix) (12", Promo) RCA 1990

1st Voyage ◄ (3 versions) R&S Records 1991

Rolling Thunder ◄ (4 versions) Outer Rhythm 1991

Stairway To Heaven ◄ (2 versions) R&S Records 1992

Never Leave ◄ (2 versions) Love Records 1992

Outrages Angel EP (12", EP) Outrage Recordings 1992

The Family EP ◄ (2 versions) Apollo 1993

Royal Techno EP ◄ (2 versions) Rotation Records 1993

New Orchestrations EP ◄ (2 versions) Fnac Music Dance Division 1993

3rd Voyage (12") R&S Records 1993

Original Man (12") Aura Surround Sounds 1993

In Flight Entertainment ◄ (3 versions) Blunted, Island Records 1994

Seas of Tranquility EP (12", EP) Rotation Records 1994

Handle With Care EP ◄ (6 versions) Blunted 1995

Stalker / Timeless (7", Ltd) Jockey Slut 1995

Timeless ◄ (3 versions) 4th & Broadway, Island Records 1996

Funk Music ◄ (6 versions) Island Records 1997

Tokyo Stealth Fighter ◄ (7 versions) 4th & Broadway 1997

This Is Disco ◄ (4 versions) 4th & Broadway 1997

Excursions E.P. (12", EP) Jericho 1998

Insights EP (12", EP) Rotation Records 1998

Knockout EP ◄ (2 versions) Rotation Records 1999

Dave Angel / Jamie Anderson – The Knockout EP / The Rematch (12", EP) Rotation Records 2000

Dave Angel / Jel Ford – Myths EP ◄ (2 versions) Rotation Records 2002

Ocean Dwellers ◄ (2 versions) Rotation Records 2003

Warriors E.P. (12", EP) Rotation Records 2005

Rotation (DJ Marky & XRS Remix) / Brothers (XRS Remix) ◄ (2 versions) V Recordings 2006

Taurus / Gemini (12") Niah 2007

Sheba / Mothership – Part 1 (12") Niah 2007

Medusa (12") Jericho 2008

Ghost Train E.P. ◄ (2 versions) Plaza in Crowd 2009

Dogspray (12") Jericho 2009

Front And Back (12") Jericho 2010

K Road Nz (12", S/Sided, W/Lbl, Ltd) Unknown

=== DJ mixes ===
Trance Lunar Paradise ◄ (3 versions) Sound Dimension Recordings 1994

X-Mix-4 – Beyond The Heavens ◄ (4 versions) Studio !K7 1995

Darren Emerson & Dave Angel – Mixmag Live! Volume 13 – Techno ◄ (2 versions) DMC Publishing 1996

Dr Alex Paterson* / Mixmaster Morris / Mr C* / Sven Vath* / Darren Emerson / Dave Angel – The History of Mixmag Live – 3 (Volumes 009/011/013) (3xCD, Comp, Mixed + Box, Comp) DMC Publishing 1997

London Electronica – In The Mix With Dave Angel (CD, Comp, Mixed) Kickin Records 1997

39 Flavours of Tech Funk (2xCD, Mixed, Comp) React 1998

DA01 (CD, Comp, Mixed) Trust The DJ 2001

DA03 ◄ (2 versions) Trust The DJ 2003
