= Keep Reachin Up =

Keep Reachin' Up

Studio album by Nicole Willis & The Soul Investigators
- Released: 2005
- Recorded: 2003–2005
- Genre: Soul; funk
- Length: 39:40
- Label: Lifesaver | Timmion
- Producer: Didier Selin

Professional ratings
Review scores
Source	Rating
AllMusic	4/5 stars
The Austin Chronicle	3/5 stars
The A.V. Club	(B)
Boston Herald	(favorable)
Les Inrocks	(favorable)
Kevchino	(9/10)
Pitchfork	(7.6/10)
PopMatters	(6/10)
Record Collector	4/5 stars
XLR8R	(10/10)

Keep Reachin' Up is a studio album by soul recording collaboration Nicole Willis & The Soul Investigators, released on Lifesaver | Timmion Records in 2005. The music is composed and performed by Nicole Willis & The Soul Investigators and the record is produced by Didier Selin. Timmion Records is located in Helsinki, Finland.

The title track was chosen as one of many songs on US President Barack Obama's re-election Spotify playlist in February 2012.

== Track listing ==
1. "Feeling Free" – 3:37
2. "If This Ain't Love (Don't Know What Is)" – 3:28
3. "Keep Reachin' Up" – 3:24
4. "Blues Downtown" – 5:13
5. "My Four Leaf Clover" – 2:53
6. "A Perfect Kind of Love" – 4:01
7. "Invisible Man" – 2:59
8. "Holdin' On" – 3:37
9. "No One's Gonna Love You" – 6:06
10. "Soul Investigators Theme" (instrumental) – 2:42
11. "Outro" (bonus track) – 1:40

== Personnel ==
- Svante Forsbäck – mastering
- Maurice Fulton – composer
- Erno Haukkala – trombone, horn arrangements
- Sami Kantelinen – bass guitar, composer
- Jay Kortehisto – trombone, soloist
- Pekka Kuusisto – violin, composer
- Antti Lauronen – baritone saxophone, horn arrangements
- Antti Määttänen – Hammond organ, piano, composer
- Jukka Sarapää – drums, composer
- Eero Savela – trumpet, horn arrangements
- Didier Selin – tambourine, bass guitar, guitar, composer, producer
- The Soul Investigators – arrangements, composition, direction
- Jimi Tenor – flute, tenor saxophone, backing vocals, composer, horn arrangements
- Pete Toikkanen – guitar, bass guitar, composer
- Lasse Tolvanen – tenor saxophone, horn arrangements
- Nicole Willis – lead & backing vocals, lyricist, composer
