= Afrika Shox =

- 12" cover

Single by Leftfield featuring Afrika Bambaataa

from the album Rhythm and Stealth
- A-side: "Shox remix"
- Released: 6 September 1999
- Genre: Breakbeat
- Length: 3:43
- Label: Hard Hands, Chrysalis Music
- Songwriters: Leftfield, Afrika Bambaataa and Nick Rapaccioli
- Producers: Leftfield, Nick Rapaccioli

Leftfield featuring Afrika Bambaataa singles chronology
"Release the Pressure'" (1996)	"Afrika Shox" (1999)	"Dusted" (1999)

"Afrika Shox" is a song by the English electronic group Leftfield, released as the first single from their album Rhythm and Stealth in 1999, and features the vocal talent of American musician Afrika Bambaataa. It was released on CD and 12" on 6 September 1999 on the Hard Hands record label, published by Chrysalis Music. The song was their highest-charting single, reaching #7 in the UK Singles Chart. The song was later used in the 2001 film Vanilla Sky and was included in the film's soundtrack album.

== Music video ==
The music video was directed by Chris Cunningham and was one of the first videos to be put into DVD quality featured in the demo disc featured in issue 51 of The Official UK PlayStation Magazine. The video portrays a homeless African-American man stumbling the streets of New York City, while pieces of him break off like porcelain. He eventually wanders into a Break-dance tournament, where a B-Boy chips off the Protagonists left leg causing him to stumble and fall to the ground to the awareness of Afrika Bambaata who assists him. As the homeless man stumbles out he gets hit by a taxi, shattering and killing him. This video portrays racial struggles and anti-capitalist ideals.

== Track listing ==
=== 12" ===
1. "Afrika Shox" (VW Remix) – 6:19
2. "Phat Planet" – 5:24
3. "Afrika Shox" (Jedis Elastic Bass Remix) – 6:12

=== CD 1 ===
1. "Afrika Shox" (Radio Edit) – 3:43
2. "Phat Planet" – 5:24
3. "Afrika Shox" (Jedis Elastic Bass Mix) – 6:12

=== CD 2 ===
1. "Afrika Shox" (VW Remix) – 6:19
2. "Phat Planet" (Dave Clarke Remix) – 5:52
3. "Afrika Shox" (Video)

== Personnel ==
Initial copies of the 12" release had a sticker incorrectly stating the version of "Phat Planet" was the Dave Clarke mix (which is available on Stealth Remixes)

== Charts ==
=== Weekly charts ===
Weekly chart performance for "Afrika Shox"
Chart (1999)	Peak position
Australia (ARIA)	87
New Zealand (Recorded Music NZ)	23
Norway (VG-lista)	11
UK Singles (OCC)	7
UK Dance (OCC)	1

=== Year-end charts ===
Year-end chart performance for "Afrika Shox"
Chart (1999)	Position
UK Singles (OCC)	186
