= Not Forgotten (song) =

1990 single by Leftfield

Single by Leftfield
- Released: 30 April 1990
- Genre: Progressive house; trance
- Length: 6:39
- Label: Outer Rhythm; Rhythm King
- Songwriter: Neil Barnes
- Producers: Neil Barnes; Mat Clark

Leftfield singles chronology
"Not Forgotten" (1990)	"More Than I Know" (1991)

"Not Forgotten" is the first single released by English electronic duo Leftfield; however, Paul Daley was not involved in the song's creation. The song was written by Neil Barnes and released only on 12" in 1990 on the Outer Rhythm record label, published by Rhythm King Music.

== Background ==
"Not Forgotten" served as Leftfiled's debut single. Within four years of its release, "Not Forgotten" saw them become the most influential production team working in British dance music. It opened up a generation of DJs and record producers to dub and tribal percussion while inadvertently creating progressive house along the way.

== Reception ==
Mixmag praised the seminal single as an important step forward for British house music. The magazine declared, "If any one record could be said to be responsible for finally making British house more respectable than its American and European cousins, 'Not Forgotten' was it. No longer would British house heads be constantly looking over their shoulders at New York, Ghent, Milan and Berlin. 'Not Forgotten' and subsequent Leftfield classics like 'Release the Pressure' and 'Song of Life' were the cement that welded a whole new British house scene together. London proudly joined the league of house capitals. British dance music has never looked back."

== Track listing ==
- Vinyl 12"

A. "Not Forgotten" – 6:40
B1. "Not Forgotten" (Fateh's on the Case) – 6:13
B2. "Not Forgotten" (Dub) – 4:48

== Charts ==
Chart (1990–1992)	Peak position
UK Singles (OCC)	120
UK Club Chart (Music Week)	23
