= Swords (Leftfield song) =

- Cover of CD1

Single by Leftfield featuring Nicole Willis

from the album Rhythm and Stealth
- Released: 10 July 2000
- Recorded: Rollover Studios, London
- Genre: Trip hop
- Length: 5:07 (album version); 4:05 (radio edit)
- Label: Hard Hands/Chrysalis Music
- Songwriter(s): Neil Barnes, Paul Daley and Nicole Willis
- Producer(s): Leftfield

Leftfield featuring Nicole Willis singles chronology
"Dusted" (1999)	"Swords" (2000)

Alternative cover
- Cover of CD2.

"Swords" is a song by the English electronic group Leftfield, released as the third single from their album Rhythm and Stealth, which also counts as their last single release until 2015. The song featured vocals by Nicole Willis. It was first featured on the soundtrack to the movie Go in April 1999, then included on the album Rhythm and Stealth on 20 September 1999 and released as a single on 10 July 2000 on the Hard Hands record label, published by Chrysalis Music.

== Track listing ==
=== CD1 ===
1. Swords (Radio Edit) - 4:05
2. Swords (Two Lone Swordsmen Remix) - 5:55
3. Swords (Leftfield Exit Mix) - 5:27
4. Swords (Video Version)

=== CD2 ===
1. Swords (Leftfield Revisited Mix) - 4:43
2. Swords (Cari Lekebusch Remix) - 5:03
3. Swords (To Rocco Rot Remix) - 5:16

=== 12" ===
1. Swords (Leftfield Revisited Mix) - 4:43
2. Swords (Two Lone Swordsmen Remix) - 5:55
3. Swords (Cari Lekebusch Remix) - 5:03
4. Swords (To Rocco Rot Remix) - 5:16
