= Original (Leftfield song) =

- CD single cover

Single by Leftfield featuring Toni Halliday

from the album Leftism
- Released: 13 March 1995
- Recorded: Rollover Studios, London
- Genre: Trip hop
- Length: 6:22 (album version) 4:10 (radio edit)
- Label: Hard Hands/PolyGram
- Songwriters: Neil Barnes, Paul Daley, Toni Halliday
- Producer: Leftfield

Leftfield featuring Toni Halliday singles chronology
"Open Up" (1993)	"Original" (1995)	"Afro-Left" (1995)

Music video
- "Original" on YouTube

"Original" is a song by English electronic duo Leftfield, released on 12" and CD on 13 March 1995 by Hard Hands/PolyGram as the third single from their debut album, Leftism (1995). It features singer Toni Halliday on vocals and gave the group their first appearance on Top of the Pops, reaching number 18 on the UK Singles Chart. Halliday wrote the lyrics with Neil Barnes and Paul Daley. The beginning of the song is used often on the UK version of Big Brother.

== Background ==
Toni Halliday told about "Original":

"They gave me a DAT tape of 12 minutes of music which seemed to change every 12 bars. I put it on my 24-track and added some experimental vocals, with different lyrics and chorus ideas. There was one bit where I wrote the start and end of a scene in an imaginary movie, and they loved that. So they rewrote the track to fit around it. One person said he thought "Original" was about the death of dance music. I can't say what it is about, but it's definitely personal. It's very dark and disturbing. Whatever people think of my lyrics, I always say it's probably more interesting than my own explanation."

== Critical reception ==
Dave Simpson from Melody Maker named "Original" Single of the Week, adding, "The intro sounds like the launching of some faraway spacecraft (well, all right, Kraftwerk), the main chassis of the song is some inter-Galaxian funk, and some sampled guitars mimic the flight of a slightly malfunctioning Venusian Observer's Vehicle." Another Melody Maker editor, David Bennun, wrote, "Aptly enough, "Original" is used as a title: the song gives gainful employment to Toni Halliday, whose cold and disconnected passions fit Leftfield's sensuous, distant dub even more smoothly than they did Curve's fey barrage. You're an original, got your own path. Well, if ever a band has earned the right to serenade itself..." A reviewer from Music Week's RM Dance Update called it a "slow and low dub adventure". Another editor, James Hamilton, described it as a "haunting dubby slow 0-86bpm tugger muttered and crooned by Curve's Toni Halliday". Roger Morton from NME found that the song "boldly brings in former lady of Curve [...] to hiss machine age ice maiden vocals over melancholy Electroluxed reggae without sounding like gimmick synth pop." The magazine's Stuart Bailie viewed it as "freeze-dried and terrifying", and "a masterful creation."

== Track listing ==
- 12"
1. "Original" - 6:22
2. "Original" (Jam) - 5:27
3. "Filter Fish" - 7:40
4. "Original" (Drift) - 4:07
- CD
1. "Original" (Radio Edit) - 4:10
2. "Original" (Live Dub) - 7:37
3. "Original" (Jam) - 5:27
4. "Filter Fish" - 7:40
- Australian CD
1. "Original" (Radio Edit) - 4:10
2. "Original" (Live Dub) - 7:37
3. "Original" (Jam) - 5:27
4. "Original" (Album Version) - 6:22
5. "Filter Fish" - 7:40

== Charts ==
Chart (1995)	Peak position
Australia (ARIA)	129
Europe (Eurochart Hot 100)	81
Scotland (OCC)	20
UK Singles (OCC)	18
UK Dance (OCC)	11
UK Club Chart (Music Week)	40
