= Leftfield =

British electronic music duo

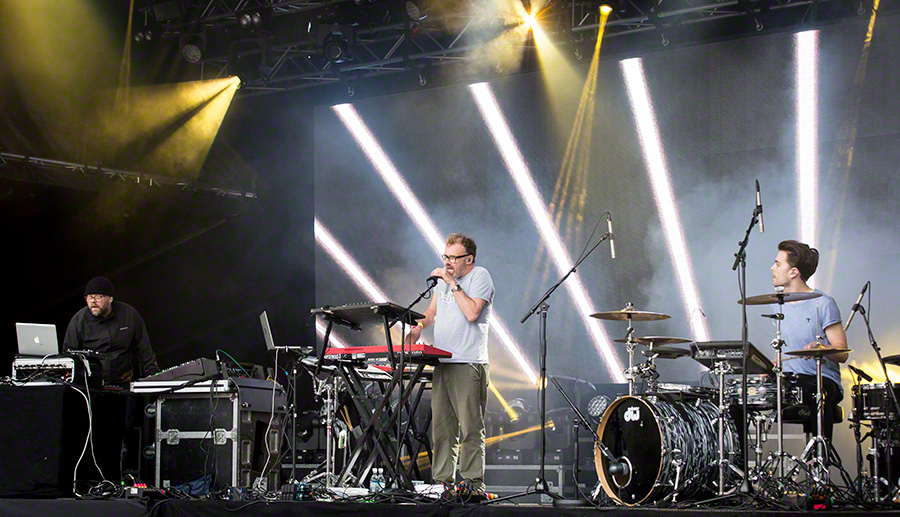
- Leftfield performing live in 2016: L-R: Adam Wren, Neil Barnes, Nick Rice (from the band Hadouken!)

Background information
- Origin: London, England
- Genres: Progressive house; electronic; trip hop; dub techno; house
- Years active: 1989–2002, 2010–present
- Labels: Outer Rhythm (Rhythm King); Hard Hands; Columbia; Infectious; Virgin
- Members: Neil Barnes; Adam Wren; Sebastian Beresford
- Past members: Paul Daley; Nick Rapaccioli
- Website: leftfieldmusic.com

Leftfield are a British electronic music group formed in London in 1989, a duo of Neil Barnes (born 6 August 1960) and Paul Daley (the latter formerly of The Rivals and A Man Called Adam). The duo was influential in the evolution of electronic music in the 1990s, with Mixmag describing them as "the single most influential production team working in British dance music". As with many of their contemporaries, such as The Chemical Brothers and Fatboy Slim, Leftfield are notable for their use of guest vocalists in their works. Among them are Toni Halliday on "Original", John Lydon on "Open Up", Djum Djum on "Afro-Left", Earl 16 and Cheshire Cat on "Release the Pressure", and Grian Chatten of Fontaines D.C. on "Full Way Round". The term progressive house was coined to define their style, a fusion of house with dub and reggae.

There was a hiatus in recording and live performances between 2002 and 2010. When Barnes revived Leftfield, Daley declined to be involved, preferring to focus on his solo career. After touring for a few years, Barnes finished writing new material for a third Leftfield album, Alternative Light Source, which was released in 2015. In 2022, they released their fourth studio album, This Is What We Do.

== Formation ==
Neil Barnes' music career started off as a DJ at The Wag Club while simultaneously playing percussion on a sessional basis. In 1986, he joined the London School of Samba and played the bateria in the 1986 Notting Hill Carnival. Around 1989, inspired by Afrika Bambaataa, Barnes decided to try his hand at electronic music production, the results of which were the tracks "Not Forgotten" and "More Than I Know", released on Rhythm King Records offshoot label Outer Rhythm. For the remixes of these tracks, Barnes called upon Paul Daley, percussion player with A Man Called Adam and formerly a session musician for the Brand New Heavies and Primal Scream, appearing on their Dixie-Narco EP. Barnes and Daley had previously worked together as percussionists at The Sandals first club, Violets. Described by Barnes as "[t]he sound of 15 years of frustration coming out in one record", the piece was termed "Progressive House" by Mixmag and held significant prominence in nightclubs from 1991 onwards. As their mutual interest in electronic music became clear the pair decided that they would work instead upon Leftfield, once Barnes had extricated himself from his now troublesome contract with Rhythm King's Outer Rhythm subsidiary. The name Leftfield was originally used by Barnes for his first single, with editing/arranging and additional production undertaken by Daley. However, after this, Daley was subsequently involved in remixing "Not Forgotten" and thereafter in the creation of all of Leftfield's work until the band split up in 2002.

During this period, in which the band could not release their own music owing to the legal dispute with Rhythm King, the pair undertook remix work for React 2 Rhythm, I.C.P. (Ice Cool Productions), Supereal, Inner City, Sunscreem, Ultra Naté and provided two remixes to David Bowie's single "Jump They Say". Finally, once the problems with their former label had been sorted out, Leftfield were able to unveil their single "Release the Pressure".

== Albums ==
=== Leftism ===
Leftfield's first major career break came with the single "Open Up", a collaboration with Public Image Ltd and former Sex Pistols vocalist John Lydon, that was soon followed by their debut album, Leftism in 1995, blending dub, breakbeat, and house. It was shortlisted for the 1995 Mercury Music Prize but lost out to Portishead's Dummy. In a 1998 Q magazine poll, readers voted it the eightieth greatest album of all time, while in 2000 Q placed it at number 34 in its list of the 100 Greatest British Albums Ever. The album was re-released in 2000 with a bonus disc of remixes, and again in 2017 as a remastered version with eleven completely new remixes.

=== Rhythm and Stealth ===
Their second album, Rhythm and Stealth (1999) maintained a similar style, and featured Roots Manuva, Afrika Bambaataa and MC Cheshire Cat from Birmingham. The album was shortlisted for the Mercury Music Prize in 2000 but lost out to Badly Drawn Boy's The Hour of Bewilderbeast. It reached No. 1 in the UK Albums Chart. The album featured the song "Phat Planet" which featured on Guinness' 1999 advert, Surfer, and "6/8 War" featured on the Volkswagen Lupo Advert 'Demon Baby'. The track "Double Flash" featured in the PlayStation software game Music 2000. Leftfield split in 2002, with both Barnes and Daley planning to work on separate solo projects.

=== Reformation and Alternative Light Source ===
Leftfield headlined RockNess in Dores, Scotland in June 2010, Creamfields in Cheshire, England in August 2010, and played the final set on the main stage at Ireland's three-day festival, Electric Picnic in September. Further headline festival shows were announced in the coming weeks. Leftfield is now represented by Neil Barnes on keyboards and drum programming, with a rotating group of vocalists, MC Cheshire Cat, Adam Wren on engineering and programming and Sebastian 'Bid' Beresford on drums. Founding member Paul Daley declined to rejoin, focusing on his solo DJ career.

On 25 March 2015, the new single, "Universal Everything", was premiered on Annie Mac's BBC Radio 1 show. Shortly afterwards the new album was announced via the Leftfield website and social networks, along with UK tour dates for June 2015.

Alternative Light Source, Leftfield's first album in 16 years, was released on 8 June 2015 on Infectious Records. On 1 June 2015 the album premiere was streamed live on Twitter, coupled with conversation via hashtag #leftfieldstream. "Head and Shoulders" features Sleaford Mods on vocals, and its stop-motion and animation hybrid video debuted on Pitchfork on 6 August 2015.

=== This Is What We Do ===
A fourth album was declared finished by Barnes via Twitter on 4 February 2022, later revealed to be titled This Is What We Do. It was released on 2 December 2022 on Virgin. It debuted at No. 18 on the UK Albums Chart, before dropping out of the Top 100.

== Commercial use of tracks ==
The song "Phat Planet" was used in the "Surfer" TV advertisement for Guinness, ranked number one in Channel 4's Top 100 Adverts list in 2000. "Phat Planet" was also used in the animated television series Beast Machines: Transformers, the simulation racing games F1 2000 by EA Sports and Racedriver GRID by Codemasters. The song "Open Up" was used for the intro and main menu in the game All Star Baseball 2000 by Acclaim Sports. "Swords" was used in an advertisement for the Irish mobile phone service Eircell. In addition, their song "Release the Pressure" was used on advertisements for the O_{2} mobile phone network at its launch, and the Kerry Group's Cheestrings snack in 2006. "A Final Hit" was featured on the Trainspotting soundtrack; the b-side "Afro Ride" was also featured on the soundtracks to both wipE'out" and wipE'out" 2097 although it did not appear on the album of the first game.

A white label release called "Snakeblood" was featured on the soundtrack of The Beach (2000). The song was found to have sampled OMD's "Almost" without permission.

The song "Storm 3000" has been used as the theme tune for the BBC television programme Dragons' Den.

== Live performances ==
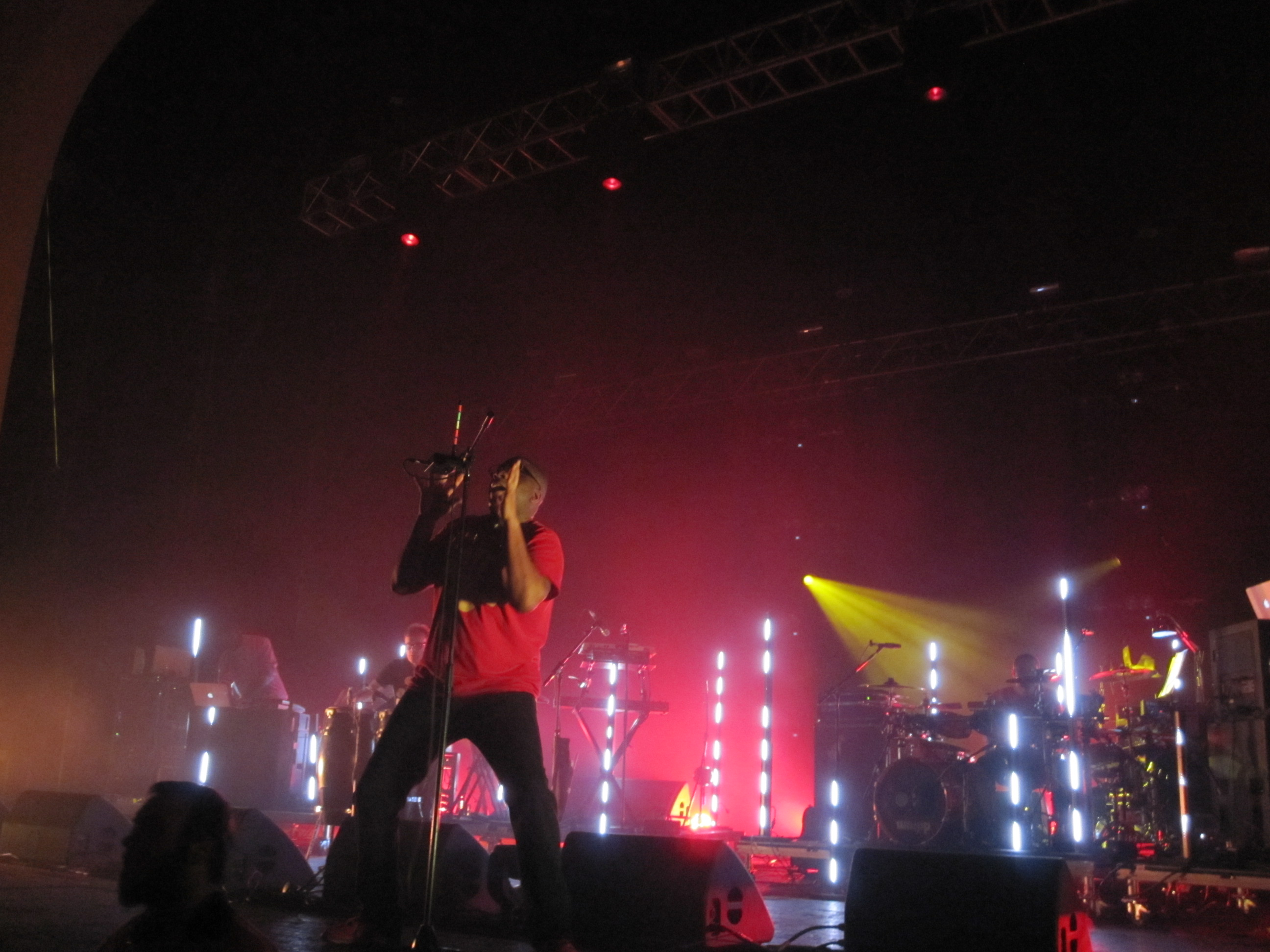
Djum Djum playing theremin during Afro-Left in December 2010

In June 1996, while the group was playing at Brixton Academy, the sound system caused dust and plaster to fall from the ceiling; subsequently, the group was banned from ever returning to the venue. The ban however was taken by the band as a ban on the sound system and not themselves, which was confirmed when Leftfield returned to Brixton again on Saturday 20 May 2000.

In November and December 2010, Leftfield did a series of dates around the UK and Ireland. Friday 3 December's gig saw more plaster fall from Brixton Academy's ceiling.

== Discography ==
=== Studio albums ===
Title	Album details	Peak chart positions										Certifications
Title	Album details	UK	AUS	BEL	FRA	GER	NED	NZ	NOR	SCO	SWI	Certifications
Leftism	Released: 30 January 1995; Label: Hard Hands	3	119	160	—	—	—	32	27	6	—	BPI: 2× Platinum
Rhythm and Stealth	Released: 20 September 1999; Label: Hard Hands/Higher Ground	1	4	11	40	33	38	7	3	1	36	BPI: Platinum
Alternative Light Source	Released: 8 June 2015; Label: Infectious	6	42	28	—	74	31	—	—	3	—	
This Is What We Do	Released: 2 December 2022; Label: Virgin Music	18	—	124	—	—	—	—	—	—	—	
"—" denotes items that did not chart or were not released in that territory.

=== Compilation albums ===
Title	Album details	Peak chart positions			Certifications
Title	Album details	UK	UK Dance	SCO	Certifications
Backlog (with Djum Djum)	Released: 14 December 1992; Label: Outer Rhythm/Rhythm King	—	—	—	
Stealth Remixes (remix album)	Released: 29 May 2000; Label: Hard Hands/Higher Ground	—	—	—	
A Final Hit – Greatest Hits	Released: 3 October 2005; Label: Hard Hands	32	2	30	BPI: Silver
"—" denotes items that did not chart or were not released in that territory.

=== Live albums ===
Title	Album details
Tourism	Released: 13 March 2012; Label: Hard Hands

=== Singles ===
Year	Title	Peak chart positions								Album
Year	Title	UK	UK Dance	AUS	FIN	NZ	NOR	SCO	US Club	Album
1990	"Not Forgotten"	120	—	—	—	—	—	—	—	Non-album singles
1991	"More Than I Know"	98	—	—	—	—	—	—	—	Non-album singles
1992	"Release the Pressure" (featuring Earl Sixteen)	—	—	—	—	—	—	—	—	Leftism
1992	"Song of Life"	59	—	—	—	—	—	—	27	Leftism
1993	"Open Up" (featuring John Lydon)	13	—	39	5	39	—	—	—	Leftism
1995	"Original" (featuring Toni Halliday)	18	11	129	—	—	—	20	—	Leftism
1995	"Afro-Left" (featuring Djum Djum)	22	15	—	—	—	—	30	20	Leftism
1996	"Release the Pressure '96" (featuring Earl Sixteen, Cheshire Cat & Papa Dee)	13	5	184	—	—	—	13	—	Non-album singles
1999	"Song of Life" (re-issue)	96	34	—	—	—	—	—	—	Non-album singles
1999	"Afrika Shox" (featuring Afrika Bambaataa)	7	1	87	—	23	11	7	—	Rhythm and Stealth
1999	"Dusted" (featuring Roots Manuva)	28	4	79	—	—	—	31	—	Rhythm and Stealth
2000	"Swords" (featuring Nicole Willis)	—	—	—	—	—	—	—	—	Rhythm and Stealth
2015	"Universal Everything"	—	—	—	—	—	—	—	—	Alternative Light Source
2015	"Bilocation" (featuring Channy Leaneagh)	—	—	—	—	—	—	—	—	Alternative Light Source
2015	"Head and Shoulders" (featuring Sleaford Mods)	—	—	—	—	—	—	—	—	Alternative Light Source
2015	"Bad Radio" (featuring Tunde Adebimpe)	—	—	—	—	—	—	—	—	Alternative Light Source
2022	"Pulse"	—	—	—	—	—	—	—	—	This Is What We Do
2022	"Accumulator"	—	—	—	—	—	—	—	—	This Is What We Do
2022	"Full Way Round" (featuring Grian Chatten)	—	—	—	—	—	—	—	—	This Is What We Do
2023	"Rapture 16" (featuring Earl Sixteen)	—	—	—	—	—	—	—	—	This Is What We Do
"—" denotes items that did not chart or were not released in that territory.

=== Remixes ===
List of produced remixes by Leftfield for other artists, showing year released and release name
Year	Artist	Release	Song(s)
1991	ICP	Free & Equal single	Free & Equal (Leftfield Remix) Free & Equal (Leftfield Tribal Mix)
1991	Supereal	Body Medusa single	Body Medusa (The Leftfield Remix) Body Medusa (The Leftfield Dub Mix)
1991	If?	Open Up Your Head single	Open Up Your Head (Vocalfield Mix) Open Up Your Head (Trancefield Dub Mix) Open Up Your Head (Stringfield Dub Mix)
1991	React 2 Rhythm	Intoxication single	Intoxication (Clubfield Mix) Intoxication (Dubfield Mix)
1991	Pressure Drop feat. Joanna Law	You're Mine single	You're Mine (Leftfield Vocal Mix) You're Mine (Guv Dub Part 2)
1992	Ultra Nate	Deeper Love (Missing You) single	Deeper Love (Missing You) (The Leftfield Vocal Mix) Deeper Love (Missing You) (Leftfield Dub) Deeper Love (Missing You) (Leftfield Instrumental)
1992	Stereo MC's	Step It Up single	Step It Up (Stereo Field Dub) Step It Up (Stereo Field Instrumental Dub)
1992	Inner City	Hallelujah '92 single	Hallelujah '92 (Leftfield High On Vocal Mix)
1992	If?	Everything & More single	Everything & More (Leftfield Dub Mix Ranch) Everything & More (Leftfield Vocal Mix) Everything & More (Leftfield Ranch Dub) Everything & More (Leftfield Bonus Love Dub)
1992	Adamski	Back To Front single	Back To Front (The Rub It Radio Edit) Back To Front (The Rub It Vocal Mix) Back To Front (The Love It Dub)
1992	Sunscreem	Perfect Motion single	Perfect Motion (One Down Mix)
1993	David Bowie	Jump They Say single	Jump They Say (Leftfield Remix) Jump They Say (Dub Oddity)
1993	Inner City	Hallelujah '92 single	Hallelujah (Leftfield Glory Mix)
1993	D:Ream	Unforgiven single	Unforgiven (Leftfield Hands Mix)
1993	Morgan King	I Am Free single	I Am Free (Leftfield Dub Mix) I Am Free (Leftfield Escape From Da Da Mix)
1993	Sunscreem	Perfect Motion single	Perfect Motion (Leftfield Vocal Mix)
1994	Yothu Yindi	Timeless Land single	Timeless Land (Leftfield Vocal Mix) Timeless Land (Leftfield Dub Mix) Timeless Land (Leftfield Bengga Club Mix) Timeless Land (Leftfield Galala Dub)
1994	Morgan King	I Am Free single	I Am Free (Leftfield Mix II)
1994	Renegade Soundwave	Renegade Soundwave single	Renegade Soundwave (The Leftfield Remix) Renegade Soundwave (The Leftfield Dub)
1996	Sandals	Nothing single	Nothing (Leftfield Dub)
1996	Djum Djum	Difference single	Difference (Steng Mix)
1997	John Lydon	Sun single	Sun (Leftfield Remix) Psychopath (Leftfield Mix) Psychopath (Leftfield Dub Remix) Psychopath (Leftfield Remix #3)
1997	David Arnold	Shaken and Stirred: The David Arnold James Bond Project	Space March (feat. Leftfield)
2000	Leftfeld	Swords single	Swords (Leftfield Revisited Mix) Swords (Leftfield Exit Mix)
2001	Glen Brown & King Tubby	Select Cuts From Blood & Fire (Chapter Two) compilation album	Lambsbread Dub (Leftfield's Half Past Dub Rmx)
2005	Chalf Hassan, Renegade Soundwave	R In The Mix 2005 Part 01: Dark Coolie mixtape	Zayani El Riffi / RSW
2012	Sex Pistols	The Remixes Vol 1 white label	God Save The Queen (Leftfield Remix)
2018	Gaz Coombes	The Oaks single	The Oaks (Leftfield Remix)
2021	Dense & Pika	Colourburn album	Control (feat. Leftfield)
2022	William Orbit feat. Georgia	Bank Of Wildflowers single	Bank Of Wildflowers (Leftfield Remix)
2023	Tricky feat. Martina Topley-Bird	Maxinquaye (Reincarnated) album	Brand New You're Retro (Leftfield Remix)

=== Soundtracks and various compilations ===
- From the Shallow Grave soundtrack

"Shallow Grave" (Featuring Christopher Eccleston)
"Release the Dubs"

- From the Hackers soundtrack:

"Inspection (Check One)"
"Open Up" (featuring John Lydon)

- From the wipE'out" soundtrack

"Afro Ride" (from the EP Afro-Left)

- From 104.9 (An XFM Compilation)

"Praise"

- From the Trainspotting soundtrack

"A Final Hit"

- From the Trainspotting#2 soundtrack

"A Final Hit" (full-length version)

- From the wipE'out" 2097 soundtrack

"Afro Ride" (from the EP Afro-Left)

- From the Go soundtrack

"Swords" (featuring Nicole Willis) (Original Version)

- From The Beach soundtrack

"Snakeblood"

- From the Vanilla Sky soundtrack

"Afrika Shox"

- From Beast Machines, and EA Sports F1 2000

"Phat Planet"

- From Lara Croft: Tomb Raider

"Song of Life"
