= Earl Sixteen =

Jamaican reggae singer (born 1958)

- Born: Earl John Daley; 9 May 1958 (age 67)
- Origin: Kingston, Jamaica
- Genres: Reggae
- Instrument: Vocals
- Years active: Early 1970s–present
- Member of: Dreadzone
- Formerly of: The Flaming Phonics; The Boris Gardiner Happening

Earl Sixteen (born Earl John Daley, 9 May 1958) is a Jamaican reggae singer whose career began in the mid-1970s.

== Biography ==
Daley grew up in Waltham Park Road, Kingston, and, influenced by American soul and Jamaican artists such as Dennis Brown, began his singing career by entering local talent shows. He became the lead vocalist for the group the Flaming Phonics, playing live around Jamaica. Daley decided to drop out of school to pursue his music career, which prompted his mother to throw him out of the family home. Needing to make some money, the group tried out for producer Duke Reid but left before finishing their recording due to his habit of firing live gunshots in the studio. They then worked with Herman Chin Loy, and Daley recorded his first solo track, "Hey Baby". The group split up, with Daley concentrating on his solo career. He recorded "Malcolm X" for producer Joe Gibbs in 1975—a track written by his school friend Winston McAnuff, and which was later successfully covered by Dennis Brown. In 1977, he joined Boris Gardiner's group, the Boris Gardiner Happening, which brought him into contact with Lee "Scratch" Perry. In the late 1970s, after a spell with Derrick Harriott, Daley recorded four tracks at Perry's Black Ark studio, including the original recording of "White Belly Rat", also meeting Earl Morgan of the Heptones, who later produced his album Shining Star. In the early 1980s, Daley recorded singles for a variety of producers, including Linval Thompson, Augustus Pablo, Clement Dodd, Sugar Minott, Yabby You, and Derrick Harriott, and recorded his debut album with Mikey Dread. He teamed up with Roy Cousins for two albums, Julie and Special Request. Earlier material recorded for Studio One was released as 1985's Showcase.

In 1985, after spending time in the United States, Daley relocated to England, fathering a child. His child's mother knew Mad Professor, whom Daley began working with. He also worked with other British producers, including Stafford Douglas. One of his tracks from this era was a cover version of "Holding Back the Years", which had been a big hit for Simply Red. Returning to Jamaica, he worked briefly with King Jammy. In the 1990s, he made guest appearances on tracks by Leftfield, and he has been one of the two vocalists for the UK electronica/reggae band Dreadzone since 1995. He signed to WEA for his major label debut album, 1997's Steppin' Out, which was nominated for a MOBO award. Daley has continued touring and working with Dreadzone as well as joining Leftfield on tours.

== Discography ==
=== Solo albums ===
- Reggae Sounds (1981)
- Julie (1982) with Roy Cousins
- Super Duper (1982)
- Special Request (1983) with Roy Cousins
- Shining Star (1983)
- Songs for a Reason (1983)
- Year 2000 (1983)
- Songs of Love and Hardship (1984)
- Showcase (1985)
- Babylon Walls (1991)
- Boss Man (1992)
- Not for Sale (1993)
- Phoenix of Peace(1993)
- Rootsman (1994)
- Steppin' Out (1997)
- Wonderous Works (2000)
- Cyber Roots (2001)
- Soldiers of Jah Army (2003)
- Mash Up the Dance: Earl Sixteen Live with No More Babylon
- Feel the Fire
- Wake Up (2006)
- The Fittest (2011)
- Walls of the City (2014, Earl 16 Meets Manasseh)
- Fusion (2016, Earl 16 vs. Ken Parker)

=== with Dreadzone ===
- Second Light (1995)
- Biological Radio (1997)
- Sound (2001)
- Once Upon a Time (2005)
- Eye on the Horizon (2010)
- Escapades (2013)
- Dread Times (2017)
- Dreadzone Presents Dubwiser Volume One (2019)

=== Appearances ===
- "Release the Pressure", Leftfield (1992)
- "Release the Pressure", Leftism, Leftfield (1995)
- Laika Come Home, Spacemonkeyz vs. Gorillaz (2002)
- "Space Song", Dubioza kolektiv (2020)
- "Rapture 16", This Is What We Do, Leftfield (2022)
