= More Than I Know =

Single by Leftfield
- Released: 21 January 1991
- Genre: Electronica; house
- Length: 6:42
- Label: Outer Rhythm; Rhythm King
- Songwriter(s): Neil Barnes
- Producer(s): Neil Barnes; Mat Clark

Leftfield singles chronology
"Not Forgotten" (1991)	"More Than I Know" (1991)	"Release the Pressure" (1992)

"More Than I Know" is a song by English electronic duo Leftfield, released as their second single. Paul Daley was not involved in the song's creation; however, the B-side was a remix of "Not Forgotten" by Daley requested by Neil Barnes. The song was written by Barnes and released only on 12" on 21 January 1991 on the Outer Rhythm record label, published by Rhythm King Music.

== Track listing ==
- 12"
1. "More Than I Know"
2. "Not Forgotten" (Hard Hands Remix)
- Remix 12"
1. "More Than I Know" (10K Mix)
2. "More Than I Know" (More Mix)
3. "More Than I Know" (Even More Mix)

== Charts ==
Chart (1991)	Peak position
UK Singles (OCC)	98
UK Dance (Music Week)	21
