= Nicole Willis =

American musician and artist (born 1963)

Daniele Willis
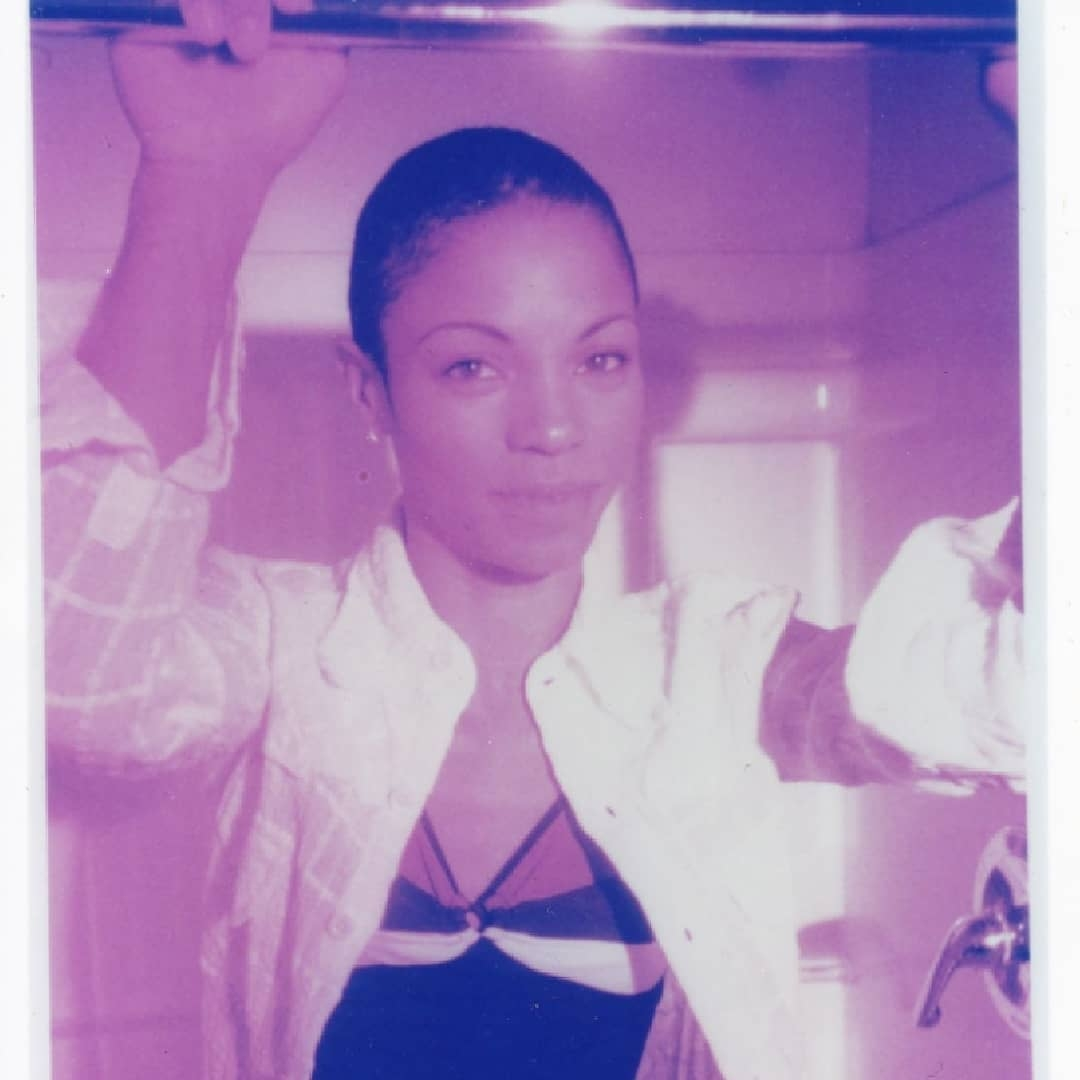
- Willis in 1997
- Born: Nicole Daniele Willis; 1963 (age 62–63); New York City, U.S.
- Years active: 1983–present
- Children: 2
- Musical career
- Origin: New York City
- Formerly of: Repercussions, Nicole Willis & The Soul Investigators

Daniele Nicole E. Willis (born 1963) is an American artist, musician, and film director. Willis lives and works in Helsinki, Finland.

== Biography ==
=== Early career ===
Willis contributed vocals in London, United Kingdom in 1985 with Washington Week in Review. Prior to that she was a member of The Hello Strangers and Blue Period with Spike Priggen, Jean Caffeine and Mark Mulcahy performances at Munson Diner and Danceteria's No Entiendes, based in New York City.

Willis was the lead vocalist of the neo soul group Repercussions. Singles and albums were released on Mo' Wax, Reprise/Warner Records USA, Pony Canyon Japan. The single Promise Me Nothing from the debut album of Repercussions LP Earth and Heaven, peaked at number 6 in the Hot Dance Music, Club Play chart of Billboard magazine on March 18, 1995. Together with Curtis Mayfield, the band recorded a version of Mayfield's Let's Do It Again in which Willis sings a duet with Curtis Mayfield in 1994 released on Reprise/Warner Records. The group also released an album on Pony Canyon Japan, titled Charmed Life in 1997.

Willis has collaborated with Leftfield singing and writing lead vocals for "Swords" on the Rhythm and Stealth LP in 1999 on Hard Hands/Higher Ground/Sony BMG Records, which was also featured on the soundtrack for the film Go released 1999. The LP Rhythm and Stealth received a Platinum Sales Award in the United Kingdom.

=== Art 2005 - 2014 ===
After moving from Barcelona, Spain to Lahti, Finland with her family, Willis began study at The Institute of Fine Arts at Lahti University of Applied Sciences in 2005. She graduated in 2009. The university has been since replaced by LAB University of Applied Sciences, incorporating campuses in Lahti & Lappeenranta whilst the LAB Institute of Design & Fine Arts incorporates campuses in Lahti (Institute of Design) & Imatra (School of Visual Arts).

Willis collaborated with artist Sophie Calle for her installation Take Care Of Yourself with a performance in time-based media in 2007, which exhibited at the French Pavilion of the Venice Biennale in 2007. Willis also contributed vocals to time-based media performance Rinologia of Barcelona-based artist group Los Rinos who are artists Marcel.lí Antúnez, Pau Nubiola and film director, Sergi Caballero. Rinologia was performed at the BEM Festival in Burgos, Spain in March 2007.

Willis contributed 10 jewel cases, painted in acrylic and one musical track, of ten musicians/visual artists musical contribution, Do the Watusi (written by Jimi Tenor, Pete Toikkanen & Nicole Willis) to curator/artist Jaakko Tuomainen's group exhibition Soundtrack for Painting from September 1 to 30, 2012, at the Lahti Modern Art Kiosk, in Lahti, Finland.

Willis had two of her first solo exhibitions of oil paintings, in 2012, first of which were in March 2012 at Galleria Kingi Kongi in Helsinki, Finland and in November 2012 at Pirkko-Liisa Topeliuksen Galleria, also in Helsinki, both titled Gatherings.

Willis has contributed a painting to a group exhibition to be shown from July 18 to August 11, 2013, in London, United Kingdom's A Side B Side Gallery, curated by artists Chloe Mortimer & Harry Pye, titled ELVIS: I Love You Because of which the subject is Elvis Presley.o

Willis had a solo exhibition at Gallery Emil in Tampere, Finland titled Talking Trash; February 2, 2014 – February 28, 2014.

=== Puu | Sähkö Recordings - Timmion Records - Herakles Records ===
On Puu/Sähkö Recordings, Willis released her first solo albums Soul Makeover 2000 and Be It 2003. In 2005 Willis collaborated with the Soul Investigators and released Keep Reachin Up on Helsinki's Timmion Records. The LP Keep Reachin' Up was critically acclaimed. Their song Feeling Free was chosen 2006 Worldwide Winner on the Gilles Peterson's BBC show.

The title track of the album Keep Reachin' Up was chosen by US president Barack Obama, as one of many songs on his Re-Election Campaign Spotify Playlist, in February 2012. The track If This Ain't Love(Don't Know What Is) was placed in the USA TV channel ABC's show Brothers & Sisters in season 2, episode 1 in 2007. The track No One's Gonna Love You was placed in Showtime's Ray Donovan in season 1, episode 3, Twerk in 2013.

Nicole Willis & the Soul Investigators released an album, titled Tortured Soul in 2013 on Timmion Records in Finland, France, United Kingdom and other regions in the EU & North America. Tortured Soul received 4 out of 5 stars in a review at Helsingin Sanomat's Nyt magazine. Tortured Soul entered the Official Finnish Music Charts in its first week after release at number 8 in week 7 of 2013.

On May 10, 2013, Willis and Jimi Tenor released album Enigmatic by their project Cola & Jimmu on her new record label Herakles Records, Finland. Cola & Jimmu went on to release a follow-up titled I Give To You My Love & Devotion in 2014. The single Open Up Your Chakra peaked at position 21 in Japan's J-Wave HOT 100 Chart in June 2014.

Timmion Records released the third Nicole Willis & The Soul Investigators album titled Happiness in Every Style in October 2015, produced and written by Nicole Willis & The Soul Investigators. Happiness in Every Style received 5 out of 5 stars in Helsingin Sanomat. Singles One in Million and Let's Communicate were released in August and October 2015.

=== Persephone | Sampson | Goliath Records - Present ===
Willis released on her new sublabel Persephone Records (Herakles Records) the EP Big Fantasy (For Me) / Tear It Down, a collaboration of Willis, Jimi Tenor and Jonathan Maron (electric bass player) on March 31, 2017.

She announced the release date of her next LP My Name Is Nicole Willis, the second release for Persephone Records as September 29, 2017. The album is a collaboration with UMO Helsinki Jazz Orchestra (credited as UMO Jazz Orchestra), composed of songs written by Willis, guitarist Pete Toikkanen and Jimi Tenor as well as from her catalogue with The Soul Investigators. Ian Svenonius is featured on the prologue as well as epilogue tracks of the album. My Name Is Nicole Willis received a 4 star review in Helsingin Sanomat.

In February 2019, Nicole Willis released an album called My Soul Sensation with a hand picked line up titled Banda Palomita, recorded at Suomenlinna Studios, as well as a digital release of the instrumental album version Banda Palomita's My Soul Sensation.

The digital release of "Polymer or PARA [Seasoned]" was added to Willis' Spotify profile as the first release (Sampson Records 2022) under the name Daniele Willis. Seasoned, an electronic, neo-classical, city garden music, "Seasoned", to be heard at Pehr Kalm Revival (Jan-Erik Andersson), in part of "Listen to a mushroom, listen to a bicycle", curated by Galleria Titanik, Turku, Finland (2020).

Willis recorded the first vocal single of the Finnish electronic group Aavikko Space Disco Muysic, written by Willis and the members of Aavikko.

Willis returned to performance art at Hunajanjyvä, Salama ja Maa on October 7, 2023, at Mad House in Helsinki, Finland. Phobos & Deimos Contemplate Reception in 2 acts of dramatic monologue, scripted, voice acted and performed by Willis along with recorded music produced by Willis. The curators of Hunajanjyvä are artists Sadet Kirsimäki and Eero Pulkkinen.

On July 12, 2024, Willis released "My Name Is Nicole Willis, Instrumentals" on Persephone | Herakles sublabel, Goliath Records. The album is available for digital sales and on streaming platforms. The instrumental versions of the album "My Name Is Nicole Willis", by Nicole Willis featuring UMO Helsinki Jazz Orchestra (Persephone Records 2017) was composed by Pete Toikkanen and Nicole Willis, and arranged, composed and scored by Jimi Tenor. Additional instrumental versions of tracks written for the original version album as well as tracks written by Nicole Willis & The Soul Investigators from the album "Happiness In Every Style" (Timmion Records 2015) are featured, as well arranged and scored by Jimi Tenor.
