= Rhythm and Stealth =

Studio album by Leftfield
- Released: 20 September 1999
- Genre: Electronica
- Length: 53:44
- Label: Hard Hands, Higher Ground, Sony BMG
- Producer: Leftfield, Nick Rapaccioli

Leftfield chronology
Leftism (1995)	Rhythm and Stealth (1999)	Stealth Remixes (2000)

Alternative cover
- Reissue edition (2000) cover

Singles from Rhythm and Stealth
- 1. "Afrika Shox" Released: 6 September 1999; 2. "Dusted" Released: 15 November 1999; 3. "Swords" Released: 10 July 2000

Rhythm and Stealth is the second studio album by the English electronic group Leftfield, released on 20 September 1999. It reached number 1 on the UK Albums Chart. It was nominated for the 2000 Mercury Music Prize.

== Critical reception ==
Professional ratings
Review scores
Source	Rating
AllMusic	4/5 stars
Alternative Press	4/5 stars
The Independent	3/5 stars
Muzik	5/5 stars
NME	6/10
Pitchfork	6.3/10
Q	3/5 stars
Rolling Stone	3.5/5 stars

Matt Hendrickson of Rolling Stone said, "The album's jumble of epic sounds is a blessing and a curse: Rhythm and Stealth never develops a sustained, full-on groove, but it makes for a mind-melding headphone adventure." John Bush of AllMusic said, "Leftfield has moved on with a grace and mastery of production seldom seen in the dance world."

NME named it the 24th best album of 1999.

== Track listing ==
No.	Title	Length
1.	"Dusted"	4:41
2.	"Phat Planet"	5:24
3.	"Chant of a Poor Man"	5:54
4.	"Double Flash"	4:11
5.	"El Cid"	6:02
6.	"Afrika Shox"	5:37
7.	"Dub Gussett"	4:51
8.	"Swords"	5:07
9.	"6/8 War"	4:13
10.	"Rino's Prayer"	6:44
Total length:		53:44

Australian edition bonus track
No.	Title	Length
11.	"Phat Planet" (Version 2)	4:05

Japanese edition bonus track
No.	Title	Length
11.	"Phat Planet" (Alternate Mix)	4:05

Reissue edition (2000) bonus enhanced CD
No.	Title	Length
1.	"Phat Planet" (Dave Clarke Remix)	5:52
2.	"El Cid" (I-Cube Simple Mix)	5:52
3.	"Rino's Prayer" (Nick Rapaccioli Remix)	5:39
4.	"Chant of a Poor Man" (Mighty Quark Remix)	5:24
5.	"Dub Gussett" (Maas Remix)	6:33
6.	"El Cid" (I-Cube Table Tennis Remix)	6:49
7.	"Double Flash" (Headstarter Remix)	6:11

Reissue edition (2000) bonus enhanced CD video
No.	Title	Length
8.	"Afrika Shox"	4:52
9.	"Dusted"	4:43

== Personnel ==
Credits adapted from liner notes.

- Neil Barnes – production
- Paul Daley – production
- Nick Rapaccioli – production (6, 7)
- Roots Manuva – vocals (1)
- Cheshire Cat – vocals (3)
- Afrika Bambaataa – vocals (6)
- Nicole Willis – vocals (8)
- Rino – vocals (10)
- Jono Gallagher – tape operation
- Nick Baxter – tape operation
- Ady Stockwell – tape operation
- Adam Wren – engineering
- Paul Solomons – mastering
- Blue Source – art direction
- Toby McFarlan Pond – photography

== Charts ==
=== Weekly charts ===
Chart (1999)	Peak position
Australian Albums (ARIA)	4
Belgian Albums (Ultratop Flanders)	11
Dutch Albums (Album Top 100)	38
French Albums (SNEP)	40
German Albums (Offizielle Top 100)	33
New Zealand Albums (RMNZ)	7
Norwegian Albums (VG-lista)	3
Scottish Albums (OCC)	1
Swedish Albums (Sverigetopplistan)	54
Swiss Albums (Schweizer Hitparade)	36
UK Albums (OCC)	1

=== Year-end charts ===
Chart (1999)	Position
UK Albums (OCC)	52
