= Release the Pressure =

1992 single by Leftfield and Earl Sixteen

Single by Leftfield featuring Earl Sixteen
- Released: 27 July 1992
- Length: 8:08
- Label: Hard Hands
- Songwriters: Neil Barnes; Paul Daley
- Producer: Leftfield

Leftfield featuring Earl Sixteen singles chronology
"More Than I Know" (1991)	"Release the Pressure" (1992)	"Song of Life" (1993)

Music video
- "Release the Pressure" on YouTube

Alternative Cover

"Release the Pressure" is the third single by the English electronic duo Leftfield and the first to involve Paul Daley with writing duties after he joined the group. The song was released exclusively on 12" in 1992. Unlike previous releases that had been released on the Outer Rhythm record label, Leftfield had now officially split from Outer Rhythm. Major labels had offered them deals but neither member wanted to give up creative control to any major company. They formed the Hard Hands record label with "Release the Pressure" being the label's first official release. The song featured reggae singer Earl Sixteen on vocals, with a lyric taken from his 1981 single "Trial and Crosses". "Release the Pressure" made the top 20 in the UK charts and featured at number one in the Melody Maker "Stone Free Chart of the Year". It was used in Telefónica O2 and O2 (UK) commercials during its first year.

== Critical reception ==
In 1992, Melody Maker named the song "Single of the Week", writing that Earl Sixteen's "laid-back drawl weaves in and out of the slow, seductive groove and alternates with a beautiful Arabian keyboard melody. It works a perfect charm. The trance dance FX will have you levitating and, in such a vulnerable physical and mental state, the Andy Weatherall-esque drum rolls will catch you unawares every time." A reviewer from Music Week gave the 1996 version three out of five, describing it as a "very commercial dub techno tune."

Roger Morton from NME noted that it contains "a plea for 'peace and unity'", "that might sound hackneyed in other hand. But the stately euphoric rubberised techno dub of Barnes and Daley's sequencing easily holds the sentiments aloft." Brad Beatnik from the RM Dance Update, gave it five out of five and named it Tune of the Week, declaring it as a "cool, soulful ragga-fuelled track". He concluded, "Once again, the production quality is superb and Leftfield provide plenty for the feet and the mind."

== Track listing ==
- 12"
1. "Release the Pressure" (The Vocal Mix) 8:08
2. "Release the Pressure" (The Rough Dub) 8:40
3. "Release the Pressure" (The Desert Edit) 5:02

== 1996 version ==
"Release the Pressure"

Single by Leftfield

from the album Leftism
- Released: 8 January 1996
- Recorded: Rollover Studios, London
- Length: 3:57
- Label: Hard Hands / Chrysalis
- Songwriters: Neil Barnes; Paul Daley; Earl Daley; S. Cheshire
- Producer: Leftfield

Leftfield singles chronology
"Afro-Left" (1995)	"Release the Pressure" (1996)	"Afrika Shox" (1999)

In 1996, an updated version of "Release the Pressure" was released as the eighth single under the Leftfield name. It was released on 12", CD and Cassette on 8 January 1996. It featured Earl Sixteen and Cheshire Cat on vocals with ad libs by Papa Dee. The song reached #13 in the UK charts. There were also four different remixes of the song with different ones as B-sides to the different format releases.

=== Track listing ===
- 12"
1. "Release the Pressure" - 3:57
2. "Release the Pressure" (Release One) – 7:23
3. "Release the Pressure" (Release Two) – 7:19
4. "Release the Pressure" (Release Four) – 5:03
- CD
1. "Release the Pressure" - 3:57
2. "Release the Pressure" (Release One) – 7:23
3. "Release the Pressure" (Release Two) – 7:19
4. "Release the Pressure" (Release Three) – 6:02
5. "Release the Pressure" (Release Four) – 5:03
- Cassette
1. "Release the Pressure" - 3:57
2. "Release the Pressure" (Release One) – 7:23
3. "Release the Pressure" (Release Two) – 7:19

== Charts ==
Chart (1992)	Peak position
UK Dance (Music Week)	6
UK Club Chart (Music Week)	24

Chart (1996)	Peak position
Australia (ARIA)	184
Israel (Israeli Singles Chart)	16
Scotland (OCC)	13
UK Singles (OCC)	13
UK Dance (OCC)	5
UK Airplay (Music Week)	36
UK Club Chart (Music Week)	35
