= Progressive house =

Subgenre of house music

- Stylistic origins: House; ambient house; tribal house; Italo house; electro house; minimal techno; IDM; dub
- Cultural origins: Early 1990s, United Kingdom
- Derivative forms: Dream house; progressive breaks; dark progressive; melodic house

Fusion genres
- Progressive trance; big room house; festival progressive house

Other topics
- Hardstyle; uplifting trance; liquid funk; Goa trance

Progressive house is a subgenre of house music. The progressive house style emerged in the early 1990s. It initially developed in the United Kingdom as a natural progression of North American and European house music of the late 1980s.

In the 21st century, specifically the 2020s, electronic music producers and journalists also documented a renewed branch of the progressive club and dance music genre basing on an earlier sound.

== Etymology ==
In the context of popular music the word "progressive" was first used widely in the 1970s to differentiate experimental forms of rock music from mainstream styles. Such music attempted to explore alternate approaches to rock music production. Some acts also attempted to elevate the aesthetic values of rock music by incorporating features associated with classical instrumental music. This led to a style of music called progressive rock, which has been described as "the most self-consciously arty branch of rock."

According to DJ and producer Carl Craig, the term "progressive" was used in Detroit in the early 1980s in reference to Italo disco. The music was dubbed "progressive" because it drew upon the influence of Giorgio Moroder's Euro disco rather than the disco inspired by the symphonic sound of Philadelphia soul. In Detroit, prior to the emergence of techno, artists like Alexander Robotnick, Klein + M.B.O. and Capricorn filled a vacancy left after disco's demise in America. In the late 1980s, UK music journalist Simon Reynolds introduced the term "progressive dance" to describe acts such as 808 State, The Orb, Bomb the Bass and The Shamen. Between 1990 and 1992, the term "progressive" referred to the short-form buzz word for the house music subgenre "progressive house".

== History ==
=== Origins and early development ===
Progressive house emerged after the first wave of house music. The roots of progressive house can be traced back to the early 1990s rave and club scenes in the United Kingdom. In 1992, Mixmag described it at the time as a "new breed of hard but tuneful, banging but thoughtful, uplifting and trancey British house." A combination of US house, UK house, Italian house, Polish house, German house, and techno largely influenced one another during this era. The term was used mainly as a marketing label to differentiate new rave house from traditional American house. Progressive house was a departure from the Chicago acid house sound. The buzz word emerged from the rave scene around 1990 to 1992, describing a new sound of house that broke away from its American roots. Progressive house was viewed by some as anti-rave as its popularity rose in English clubs while breakbeat hardcore flourished at raves. According to DJ Dave Seaman, the sound faced a backlash in the early 2000s because "it had gone the same way as progressive rock before it. Pompous, po-faced and full of its own self importance. But basically was really quite boring." The label progressive house was often used interchangeably with trance in the early years. The record label Bedrock Records released a series of "Bedrock's 'Compiled and Mixed'" albums featuring artists like Chris Fortier, John Creamer & Stephane K. Australian artist, Luke Chable has been known for his 2003 seminal remix release PQM's "You Are Sleeping", titled "You Are Sleeping (Luke Chable Vocal Pass)".

According to American DJ/producer duo Gabriel & Dresden, Leftfield's October 1990 release "Not Forgotten" was possibly the first progressive house production. The record label Guerilla Records, set up by William Orbit & Dick O'Dell, is thought to have been pivotal in the growth of a scene around the genre. Renaissance: The Mix Collection in 1994 and Northern Exposure in 1996 have both been credited with establishing the genre on mixed compilation albums. As well as Guerilla Records, the labels Deconstruction Records, Hooj Choons and Soma Records contributed to the scene's development in the early to mid-1990s.

In June 1992, Mixmag published a list that contained what the magazine viewed as the top progressive house tracks at that time. These included Leftfield's "Not Forgotten", Slam's "IBO/Eterna", Gat Decor's "Passion" and Spooky's "Don't Panic".

According to AllMusic, a music database, this genre of house music separated itself from a more mainstream and vocal oriented style that relied on groove-based sounds, texturing, and rhythm that was often used in club sets.

=== Late evolution and modern interpretation ===
Hinkik - "Skystrike" (2016)
Example of a festival progressive house track

During the 2010s, the term progressive house expanded beyond its original club-oriented usage, increasingly being applied to music aimed at large venues and mainstream audiences. Classifications promoted by industry platforms, such as the DJ Mag Top 100 DJs, together with digital marketplaces like Beatport, contributed to this shift by grouping stylistically diverse tracks under a single genre label.

As a result, a distinction emerged between a form of progressive house rooted in 1990s aesthetics, characterized by gradual development and continuity, and a more immediate, high-impact style, often referred to as festival progressive house or mainstage progressive house.

During this period, artists such as Avicii and Swedish House Mafia gained international prominence, while producers including Eric Prydz and Deadmau5 remained associated with approaches closer to the genre's earlier atmospheric and progressive characteristics.

In the 2020s, a wave of progressive focused club music, often referred to in music journalism as "2020s prog", gained traction in the underground scenes by building off 1990s trance and tech-house for these dance floors. Colin Volvert from Resident Advisor stated that this generation contrasted against the festival and big stage sounds of the early 2010s by focusing on hypnotic percussion, texturing, and pacing, highlighting perspectives and tracks from artists like Rey Colino and Roza Terenzi.

== Stylistic elements ==
You Are Here
A regular (non-festival) progressive house track, with the elements gradually being introduced

According to Dave Seaman, house DJs who had originally played what was known as Eurodance borrowed from that genre. This led to a commercial sound that people associate with progressive house today. Seaman notes that with the various lines between genres having become so blurred that true progressive house is often found "masquerading" as techno, tech house or even deep house. As such, the music can feature elements derived from styles such as dub, deep house and Italo house.

The progressive sound can be distinct from the later uplifting trance and vocal trance. It tends to lack anthemic choruses, crescendos and drum rolling, but holds an emphasis on rhythmic layers. Intensity is added by the regular addition and subtraction of layers of sound. Phrases are typically 4, 8, or 16 bars long and often begin with a new or different melody or rhythm.

Elements drawn from the progressive rock genre include the use of extended or linked-movement tracks, more complexity and reflection but almost always within the four on the floor rhythm pattern.

Later progressive house tunes often featured a build-up section which can last up to four minutes. This is followed by a breakdown and then a climax. "Strobe" by Deadmau5 is a good example, which had been cited by Billboard Dance as the artist's all-time best song and one of the reasons for EDM's resurgence in the 2010s mainstream.

Jeremy W. Smith, a musicologist, interprets how such breakdowns in festival style house music alter listeners' expectations by the absence of drums, typically the four on the floor kick drum, all while shifting these rhythmic patters and tension. Smith argues that this removal of such a key piece to the rhythm creates a disorientation that brings the contrast when the beat reincorporates at the track's peak, showing how the festival era of this current genre has been structured from a more subtle and continuous style of 1990s progressive house.

== See also ==
- List of progressive house artists
- List of electronic music genres
