= Song of Life (song) =

"Song Of Life"
- CD single cover

Single by Leftfield

from the album Leftism
- Released: 30 November 1992
- Recorded: Rollover Studios, London
- Length: 4:17
- Label: Hard Hands
- Songwriters: Neil Barnes; Paul Daley; Yanka Rupkina
- Producer: Leftfield

Leftfield singles chronology
"Release the Pressure" (1992)	"Song Of Life" (1992)	"Open Up" (1993)

Alternative covers
- 12" Cover

Alternative cover
- 12" Remix Cover

"Song of Life" is the fourth single released by English electronic group Leftfield and the first on a CD single release. The song was released on 12" and CD on 30 November 1992 by label Hard Hands. The sleeve of the single had the footnote "dedicated to the memory of Steve Walters whose support, friendship and encouragement will never be forgotten". It reached #59 in the UK charts. The song was also used as the backing track for Channel 4's Dispatches programme. The Remix 12" featured two remixes by British electronic music then-trio Underworld: "The Lemon Interrupt Mix", as well as the "Steppin' Razor Mix", which both feature on Sasha & John Digweed's mix album Renaissance: The Mix Collection. The track appears in the movie Lara Croft: Tomb Raider and its soundtrack.

== Critical reception ==
Iestyn George from NME wrote, "Leftfield's nine-minute opus is the pick of the bunch, magnificently constructed with a distinctly Eastern feel."

== Impact and legacy ==
British DJ and record producer John Digweed named the song one of his favourites in 1996, saying, "Another classic record from 'Reneissance'. I've got lots of good memories of the track. I still play it today and it still goes down really well." In 2020, Mixmag featured it in their list of "The Best Basslines in Dance Music", writing, "'THEY DON'T MAKE 'EM LIKE THE '90S ANYMORE'. The amount of times I've seen that written, rolled my eyes and thought just search hard enough. Here I am playing Leftfield's 'Song Of Life', though, and I'm close to typing that out myself. It builds up, uP, UP with haunting vocals and floaty pads, before a wobbly synth bassline teases it's [sic] way in, accompanied by monstrous kicks and pacy hi-hats. Before you know it, the bassline's free of all shackles, left to fly around and do as it pleases. Relentless."

== Track listing ==
- 12"
1. "Song of Life" - 9:13
2. "Dub of Life" - 5:08
3. "Fanfare of Life" - 6:08
- CD
1. "Song of Life" (Radio Edit) - 4:18
2. "Song of Life" (Extended Version) - 8:44
3. "Fanfare of Life" - 6:05
4. "Release the Dub" - 5:45
- Remix 12"
1. "Song of Life" (Steppin' Razor Mix) - 8:24
2. "Release the Horns" - 6:08
3. "Song of Life" (The Lemon Interrupt Mix) - 10:21

== Charts ==
=== Weekly charts ===
Chart (1992–93)	Peak position
UK Singles (OCC)	59
UK Dance (Music Week)	1
UK Club Chart (Music Week)	5
US Hot Dance Club Play (Billboard)	27

=== Year-end charts ===
Chart (1992)	Position
UK Club Chart (Music Week)	58
