= David Bennun =

English writer, journalist and music critic

- Born: 1968 (age 57–58)
- Occupations: Writer, journalist, music critic
- Years active: 1990s–present

David Bennun (born 1968) is an English writer, journalist and music critic.

== Career ==
Bennun started his career in music journalism in the 1990s. Notable publications he has written for include Melody Maker, The Guardian and The Quietus. He is noted for his interview pieces, which have been cited in several books.

In 2018, he began to write about political subjects such as Brexit and anti-Semitism for The Guardian and New Statesman.

== Publications ==
=== Books ===
- Bennun, David (2004). Tick Bite Fever. Ebury Press. ISBN 9780091897437.
- Bennun, David (2010). British As A Second Language. Ebury Press. ISBN 9781409004677.

=== Selected interviews ===
- Chris Rock — Bennun, David (26 December 1999). "Ready to Rock". The Observer.
- Robert J. White — Bennun, David (2000). "Dr Robert White". The Sunday Telegraph Magazine – via Bennun's official website.
