= Phat Planet =

Song by Leftfield

from the album Rhythm and Stealth
- Released: 20 September 1999
- Recorded: August 1999
- Length: 5:24
- Label: Hard Hands; Higher Ground; Sony BMG
- Songwriters: Paul Daley; Neil Barnes
- Producer: Leftfield

"Phat Planet" is a song by the English electronic group Leftfield, taken from their album Rhythm and Stealth, released in 1999. It is built on an insistent, two-note bassline, and the heavily distorted vocal of "Phat Planet", spoken by Neil Barnes. It was not released as a single, but was used on the "Surfer" advert for Guinness.

== Other releases ==
German dance act Bass Bumpers had a UK hit single in 2006 with a mash-up of "Phat Planet" and the Baywatch theme tune. This new version was entitled "Phat Beach (I'll Be Ready)" (with the group being credited as Naughty Boy on this Ministry of Sound release) and reached number 36 on the UK Singles Chart.
