= Chrysalis Music =

British independent music publisher

Chrysalis Music is a British independent music publisher.

The company's roots started in west London in 1967 when Chris Wright and Terry Ellis formed the Ellis-Wright Agency. It was formed to manage and book the bands Ten Years After, Clouds and Jethro Tull, as well as other blues groups. Ten Years After was managed by Wright, while Clouds and Jethro Tull were managed by Ellis. In 1968, they made a deal with Island Records and very soon Chrysalis Records, an amalgam of Wright's first name and Ellis' last name, was founded.

In the late 1960s and early 1970s the label had hits with rock groups such as Jethro Tull, Ten Years After, Procol Harum, etc; Racing Cars had a hit with "They Shoot Horses Don't They" and Brian Protheroe with "Pinball". Later the label signed the ska and reggae 2 Tone label, whose roster included The Specials.

In 1975 Ann Munday was hired as Chrysalis Music's Professional Manager (she had been General Manager with Elton John and Bernie Taupin). In 1980 she subsequently became General Manager.

Ann was moved to California to develop, what eventually, Ann named The Chrysalis Music Group, USA. She was eventually promoted to Senior Vice President and General Manager, working out of the Los Angeles office and signing punk acts including Generation X and Blondie, Jack Lee, and signed some songs by Joey Alkes and Chris Fradkin, Huey Lewis And The News, Billy Idol, Eric Troyer, Pat Benatar, Neil Giraldo (a rock guitarist and songwriter who eventually married Pat), Simon Climie, Leo Sayer and Rory Gallagher. Ann moved to New York, when Terry Ellis decided to move the company there. Ann is the first woman and first non-American to be nominated to join The ASCAP Board of Directors.

After buying out Terry Ellis in 1985, Chris Wright sold Chrysalis Records to EMI in 1991. He retained the music publishing business Chrysalis Music Ltd until 2010 when it was sold to BMG Rights Management for £107 million.

In the 2000s, they also partnered with Rephlex Records to publish some of their material out, such as Aphex Twin's EP series, Analord.

Chrysalis’ songwriters included most former Echo and Chrysalis Records artists, Grant Lee Buffalo, Dinosaur Jr., Cee Lo Green, Senses Fail, Underworld, and Yeah Yeah Yeahs.

== See also ==
- Chrysalis Group
