= Leo Williams (musician) =

English-Jamaican bassist

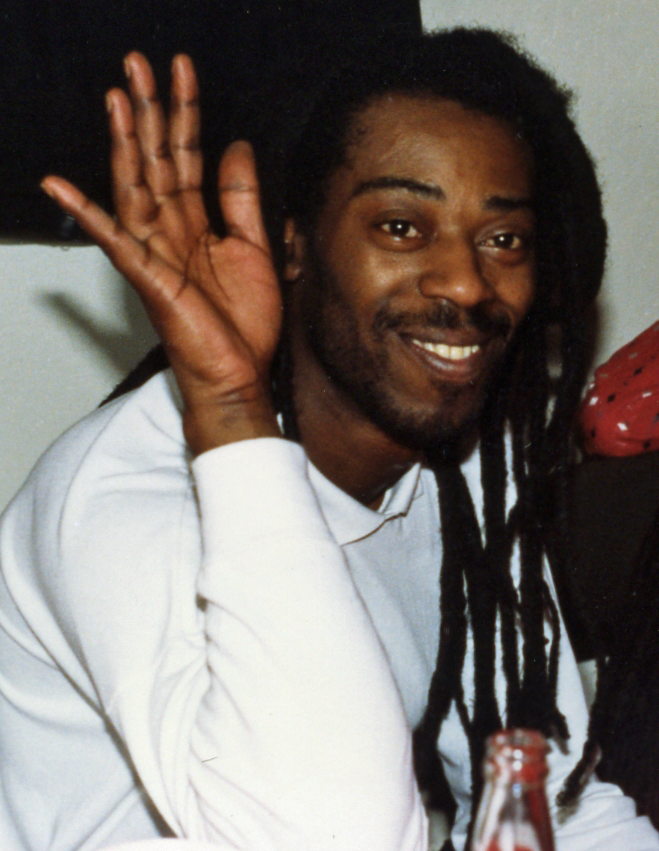
- Williams during his stint with Big Audio Dynamite in San Francisco, 1987

Background information
- Also known as: E-Zee Kill
- Born: 24 July 1959 (age 66); Saint Andrew, Jamaica
- Origin: London, England
- Genres: Post-punk; alternative dance; dance-rock; funk rock; hip-hop; reggae fusion
- Occupations: Musician; composer
- Instruments: Bass guitar; vocals
- Years active: 1980–present
- Member of: Dreadzone
- Formerly of: Big Audio Dynamite; Basement 5; Carbon/Silicon; Screaming Target

Leo Williams (born 24 July 1959), also known as E-Zee Kill, is an English-Jamaican bassist residing in the United Kingdom.

After a stint with the band Basement 5, Williams co-founded Big Audio Dynamite in 1984, a band led by Mick Jones, former lead guitarist, and co-lead vocalist of the Clash. Other BAD members included Don Letts, Greg Roberts and Dan Donovan.

After four studio albums together, the original BAD line-up broke up in 1989. Williams, together with Don Letts and drummer Greg Roberts, formed the band Screaming Target after Big Audio Dynamite's demise. Later, Williams joined Dreadzone, a group with his former bandmate Dan Donovan, and, again, Greg Roberts.

In March 2007, it was announced that—in addition to his work with Dreadzone, Williams would be a touring bassist for Carbon/Silicon, Mick Jones' latest musical endeavor. Williams appeared in the band's music video for "The News," and is featured as a band member on the official Carbon/Silicon website.

Williams rejoined the re-formed Big Audio Dynamite in 2011, which broke up again that same year.

Williams also featured in the science fiction action film The Fifth Element (1997) as the fuel loader of the Fhloston Paradise shuttle.

== Discography ==
=== With Basement 5 ===
- Peel Sessions (1980)
- Silicone Chip (1980, Island Records)
- The Last White Xmas (1980, Island Records)
- 1965–1980 (L.P. 1980 Island Records)
- In Dub (L.P. 1980 Island Records)

=== With Big Audio Dynamite ===
- This Is Big Audio Dynamite (1985)
- No. 10, Upping St. (1986)
- Tighten Up Vol. 88 (1988)
- Megatop Phoenix (1989)

=== With Screaming Target ===
- Hometown Hi-Fi (1991, Island Records)

=== With Dreadzone ===
- 360° (1993, Tristar)
- Little Britain (1995, Virgin Records)
- Second Light (1995, Virgin Records)
- Zion Youth (1995, Virgin Records)
- Moving On (1997, Virgin Records)
- Biological Radio (1997, Virgin Records)
- The Radio 1 Sessions (2001, Strange Fruit)
- Sound (2002)
- Once Upon a Time (2005)
- Live at Sunrise (2006)
- Eye on the Horizon (2010)
- Escapades (2013)
- Dread Times (2017)
- Nine (2024)
