= Donna McKevitt =

English composer

Donna McKevitt (born 1970) is an English composer based in London. She studied viola with Gustav Clarkson and voice with Linda Hirst and gained a BA Hons in music at Kingston Polytechnic.

She was a member of Miranda Sex Garden between 1991 and 1994, recording Iris, Suspiria and Fairytales of Slavery with them for Mute Records and touring Japan, the United States and Europe.

She began a collaboration with musician Greg Roberts of Dreadzone, going on to write, sing and play on their albums Second Light and Biological Radio with Virgin Records.

While touring and recording full-time, McKevitt set some of Maya Angelou's poems for voice, trumpet and double bass. In 1993, after contributing to the soundtrack of director Derek Jarman's last film Blue, she began work on song cycle Translucence. These settings of Jarman's poems were recorded for Warner Classics in 1997 by Andrew Keener and featured the voices of Michael Chance and Melanie Pappenheim. Described in The Times as "a work of haunting and unpretentious beauty", Translucence has been performed by the original ensemble at Columbia University (broadcast live on WNYC Radio), at the City of London Festival and at Tate Modern. It has also been performed at the Edinburgh Festival and in Boston, Tokyo, Sydney and Zurich by other ensembles.

In 2000, McKevitet moved to Sarajevo where she continued writing, producing settings of poetry by Paul Celan, E. E. Cummings, Ben Okri and later, in collaboration with film maker Chris Briggs, work by Pablo Neruda. Love Songs for Michael, the settings of three Michaelangelo sonnets for Michael Chance and lutist Nigel North, were commissioned and performed at The Radovljica Festival in Slovenia in 2000.

McKevitt is a member of the band The Mabuses and composer for the photographer Emma Summerton, contributing film scores and soundtracks for the fashion house Bodyamr, London and Paris Fashion Week, Jaeger and Italian Vogue.

2010 saw the release of This is What I Wanted to Give You a collaboration with The Cesarians' drummer and poet Jan Noble and the beginning of a new song cycle from McKevitt. In 2012, McKevitt wrote the score for feature film The Fold, directed by John Jencks, That year she produced a score with composer Hannah Peel for a contemporary dance piece Compass performed on the main stage at Sadler's Wells.

In 2015 she was awarded a place on Yorke Dance's Cohan Collective and was commissioned to write a piece for a new work with choreographer Charlotte Edmonds which was premiered at The Lilian Baylis Studio.

A one-hour retrospective of her work (broadcast on WNYC in December 2011) included a live studio session with trumpeter Lew Soloff and double bassist Francois Mouton in which she presented her settings of Maya Angelou's poetry as well as recordings of her work with Miranda Sex Garden, songs from Translucence and new tracks from McKevitt & Noble.

In 2018 McKevitt won first prize to write a new work for Festival Stradella, the resulting work Concentus was performed across Italy, and in 2019 was commissioned to write for The ORA Singers inaugural concert at LSO St Lukes London.

In 2021, McKevitt was commissioned by the vocal group Voces8 to write two new pieces for their Live From London concert series. She set a poem by Pablo Neruda, Keeping Quiet, and another by Edna St Vincent Millay, Renascence.

In 2020, McKevitt collaborated with filmmaker Mark Cousins and write the score for his film The Story of Looking, which premiered at the Sheffield Festival and Telluride Film Festival. She collaborated with Cousins again on his documentary My Name is Alfred Hitchcock, which premiered at the Telluride Film Festival in 2022.

In 2021, McKevitt was given the Composers' Fund award from PRS Foundation to compose a new work for voices and orchestra.

Her setting of the Nunc dimittis Lumen was released in 2022 by The Gesualdo Six on Hyperion

== Discography ==
- Iris with Miranda Sex Garden, 1992, Mute Records
- Suspiria with Miranda Sex Garden, 1993, Mute Records
- Fairytales of Slavery with Miranda Sex Garden, 1993, Mute Records
- Second Light with Dreadzone, 1995, Virgin Records
- Earth Angel (single) with Dreadzone, 1997, Virgin Records
- Biological Radio with Dreadzone, 1997, Virgin Records
- Translucence Jarman/McKevitt, 1998, Warner Classics
- Translucence Jarman/McKevitt, 2004, Dharma Records
- This is what I wanted to give you (single) McKevitt & Noble, 2010, Not Your Average Type
- This is a Bucket (single) McKevitt & Noble, 2010, Not Your Average Type
- This is her... (single) McKevitt & Noble, 2011, Not Your Average Type
- Cut EP
