= Other 99 =

Single by Big Audio Dynamite

from the album Tighten Up Vol. 88
- B-side: "What Happened to Eddie?"
- Released: 1988
- Studio: Beethoven St. (West London)
- Genre: Pop rock; alternative dance; new wave
- Length: 4:49
- Label: CBS
- Songwriters: Mick Jones; Don Letts
- Producer: Mick Jones

Big Audio Dynamite singles chronology
"Just Play Music!" (1988)	"Other 99" (1988)	"James Brown" (1988)

"Other 99" is a song by the English band Big Audio Dynamite, released as both a 7" and 12" single from their third studio album, Tighten Up Vol. 88 (1988). Written by Mick Jones and Don Letts, and following the moderate success of "Just Play Music!", "Other 99" was released as the second and final single from the album, peaking at No. 81 on the UK singles chart, and No. 13 on Billboard's Modern Rock Tracks chart. The single features the non-album track, "What Happened to Eddie?" as its B-side, which remains exclusive to the single.

== Track listing ==
7" single

1. "Other 99"
2. "What Happened to Eddie?"

12" single and CD single

1. "Other 99 (Extended Mix)"
2. "Just Play Music! (Club Mix)"
  - Mixed by Greg Roberts
3. "What Happened to Eddie?"

== Chart performance ==
Chart	Position
UK singles chart	81
US Modern Rock Tracks	13
