= Dan Donovan (keyboardist) =

British musician

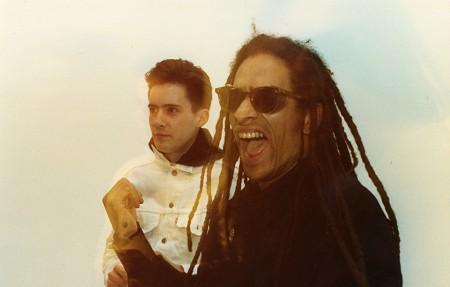
- Donovan (left) with fellow Big Audio Dynamite member Don Letts (right) in 1987

Background information
- Born: Daniel Donovan; London, England
- Genres: Post-punk; alternative dance; dance-rock; funk rock; hip-hop; reggae fusion
- Occupations: Musician; composer; photographer; remixer
- Instruments: Keyboards; vocals
- Years active: 1984–present
- Formerly of: Big Audio Dynamite; Dreadzone
- Website: dan-donovan.com

Daniel Donovan is an English keyboardist, composer, photographer and remixer. He was a founding member of Big Audio Dynamite and of Dreadzone.

== Career ==
Following a brief touring stint with the Sisters of Mercy in 1990, he became a founding member of Dreadzone. He officially left Dreadzone during the development of Zion Youth, but returned in 1996.

He took the album cover photograph for Big Audio Dynamite's debut studio album, This Is Big Audio Dynamite (1985), which meant he wasn't featured in it. It was the same with their debut single "The Bottom Line".

== Family ==
Donovan was named after his grandfather Daniel Donovan. His similar-named father Terence Daniel Donovan was a photographer and film director. Through his father he is related to half-sister Daisy Donovan, a broadcaster and comedian, and Rockstar Games co-founder Terry Donovan. He was married to actress and singer Patsy Kensit from 1988 to 1991.

== Discography ==
=== With Big Audio Dynamite ===
- This Is Big Audio Dynamite (1985)
- No. 10, Upping St. (1986)
- Tighten Up Vol. 88 (1988)
- Megatop Phoenix (1989)

=== With Screaming Target ===
- Hometown Hi-Fi (1991, Island Records)

=== With Dreadzone ===
- 360°
- Second Light (1995, Virgin Records)
- Zion Youth (1995, Virgin Records)
- Moving On (1997, Virgin Records)
- Biological Radio (1997, Virgin Records)
- The Radio 1 Sessions (2001, Strange Fruit)
- Sound (2002)
- Once Upon a Time (2005)
- Eye on the Horizon (2010)
