= The Evening of Ashura =

1976 painting by Mahmoud Farshchian

- Artist: Mahmoud Farshchian
- Year: 1976
- Location: Astan Quds Razavi, Mashhad

The Evening of Ashura (Persian: عصر عاشورا) is a painting executed in 1976 by Iranian painter Mahmoud Farshchian. The central motif is the sadness and sorrow of Husayn ibn Ali’s family while crying around his horse which has returned without its rider. The horse's messy hair, even the shape of its eyes, the lowering of its head, and the bloodstains on its body, indicate the calamity that has happened. Husayn ibn Ali was killed in the Battle of Karbala. It is one of the most inspiring and popular works of the Iranian artist, particularly for Shias.

== Artist ==
Mahmoud Farshchian (born January 24, 1930) is a Persian painter and miniaturist. He was born in the city of Isfahan where he learned art, painting, and sculpting. His works have been hosted by several museums and exhibitions worldwide. He is the most prominent modernizer of the field of miniatures, an art form which was first established in Ancient Persia and later spread to China and Turkey and other Middle Eastern countries. In addition, the design of the Zarih, roof, door and cellar in the shrine of Ali al-Ridha, the 8th Shia Imam, in Mashhad and his membership in the committee supervising the construction of the shrine, is among his works.

== Title and subject ==
The Evening of Ashura is about the killing of Husayn ibn Ali in battle of Karbala who is unseen in the illustration and his horse is depicted returning to the tents alone, highlighting his martyrdom. There are women and young girls who are crying their hearts out at the feet of the charger which is back from the battle without bringing its rider back. There is an untidy saddle with pigeons hit by arrows falling on the saddle.

== Reactions ==
Ayatollah Khamenei the leader of Islamic republic of Iran expressed his opinion about Farshchian's work: Even though I know the monodies of Ashura, Mr. Farshchian's work is like a monody that makes us cry. What a precious, exquisite and meaningful piece of art, created by an artist that can incite such emotions!
