= Basement 5 =

Reggae punk fusion band

Basement 5 were a reggae punk fusion band from London founded in 1978. Their first vocalist was Winston Fergus, then Don Letts. One of their early performances was a support for Public Image Ltd.'s London debut at the Rainbow on Christmas Day 1978. Finally in 1979 Dennis Morris - photographer of Bob Marley and the Sex Pistols, took over as creative force, lead vocalist and lyricist. He also designed the Basement 5 logo and created their image. The drums were played by Richard Dudanski, who had played in the bands 101ers, The Raincoats and Public Image Ltd. Their songs reflected the political situation of the time in Great Britain in the era of Margaret Thatcher: youth unemployment, strikes, racism and the poverty of the working class.

In 1980 they got signed to Island Records with vocalist Dennis Morris. The new line up played its debut gig at Clarendon Hotel in London (19 March 1980), followed by a set at Camden's Music Machine (now called KOKO) at an all night gig hosted by ZigZag magazines editor Kris Needs on 31 March 1980 along with numerous other artists such as John Cooper Clarke, Killing Joke and The Only Ones also recording a Peel Session on 21 April 1980, aired on 28 April and their debut, self-produced single, "Silicon Chip," on 26 May. Following this, they recorded their début album, 1965-1980, with record producer Martin Hannett, releasing it on 11 August. On the first day of recording the album, the existing drummer known as Anthony "Bigga" Thompson walked out of the session. The band was in shock. Having just finished touring with Ian Dury and The Blockheads who they became very friendly with, they then used their drummer "Gentleman" Charles Charles of the Blockheads for the album.

Hannett, in an interview with Dutch music magazine Oor in 1981, said, "You have to play it very loud to enjoy it fully. It was the most difficult production, I must say, the heaviest. It was eighteen degrees in the shade, the end of August. As I recall it has been the most physical album that I've ever done. Made me feel like I'd been carrying bricks around. Heavy work. Putting the bass lines in the right place. But it was good."

The sessions also yielded dub versions of several of the main tracks, released on 31 October as In Dub. "Last White Christmas" was released in time for Christmas (1 December), as a 12" and 7" (the latter in Christmas wrapping paper with a silver sticker of the band logo). The band broke up shortly thereafter, with several members forming Urban Shakedown.

In October 2017, the label Play It Again Sam (PIAS) re released the two Basement 5 albums: 1965-1980 and In Dub.

== Main members ==
- Dennis Morris - vocals
- Humphrey "J.R." Murray - guitar
- Leo "E-Zee Kill" Williams - bass
- Richard Dudanski - drums

== Other members ==
- Winston Fergus - vocals
- Don Letts - vocals
- Charley Charles - drums - uncredited but "thanked" on 1965-1980
- Anthony Thompson (Tony, aka "T") - drums - left August 1980 on first day of 1965-1980 sessions

== Discography ==
- "Silicon Chip" / "Chip Butty" 10" (1980), Island 10WIP 6614
- "Silicon Chip" / "Chip Butty" 7" (1980), Island WIP 6614
- 1965–1980, LP (1980), Island ILPS 9641
- "In Dub", Mini-LP (1980), Island IPR 2038
- "Last White Christmas" / "Paranoia Claustrophobia (Part 2) 12" (1980), Island 12WIP6654
- "Last White Christmas" / "Traffic: Dub" 7" (1980), Island WIP 6654
- 1965–1980/Basement 5 In Dub CD (1992), IMCD 145
- “1965–1980”, LP re-issue (2017) [PIAS] PIAS6580LP
- “1965–1980 (+ “In Dub”)”, CD reissue [PIAS] PIAS6580CD (2017)
- “In Dub”, EP re-issue [PIAS] PIAS1810LP (2017)
