= Dennis Morris (photographer) =

British photographer

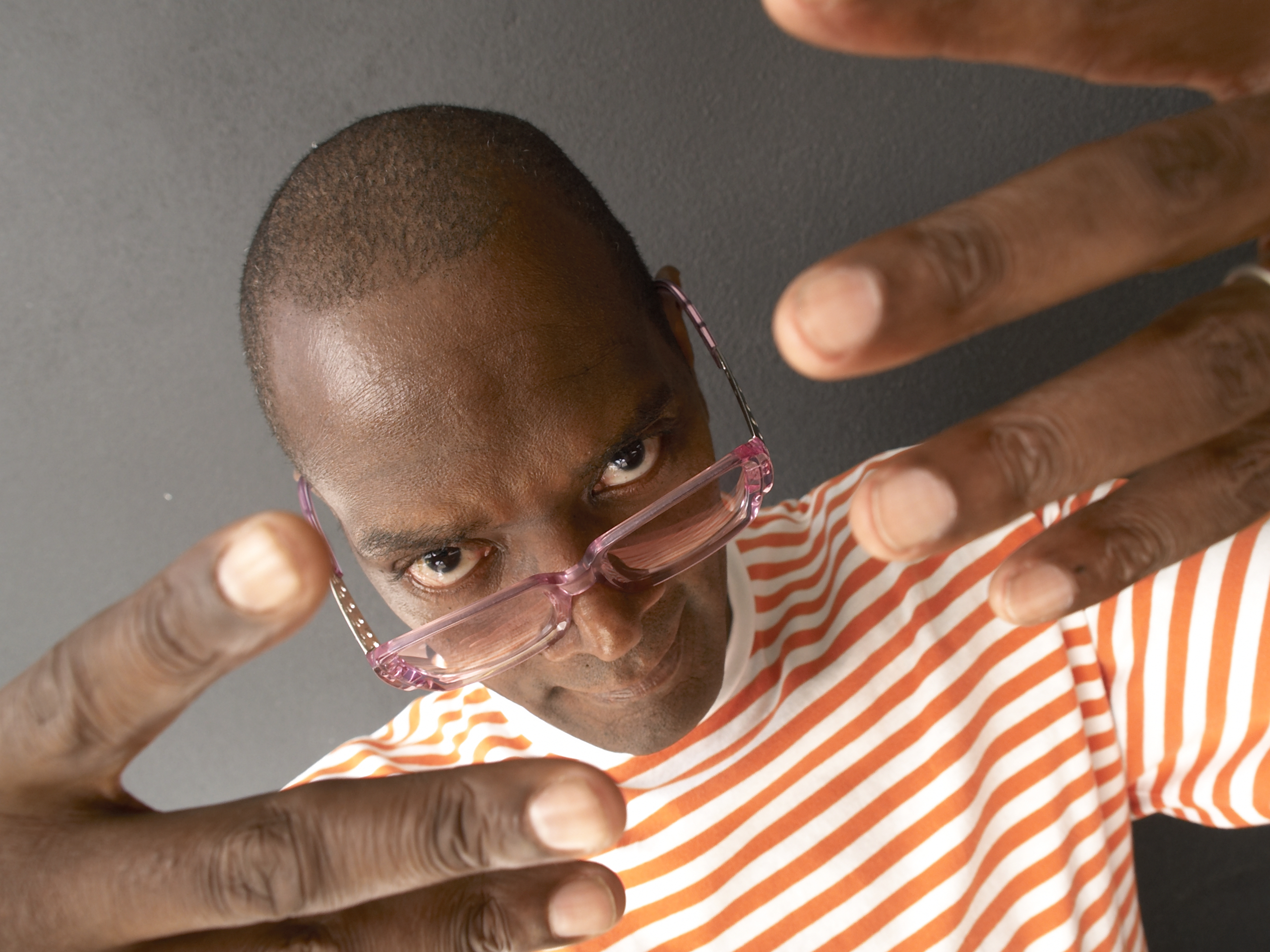
- Born: 1960 (age 65–66); Jamaica
- Occupation: Photographer
- Known for: Images of Bob Marley and the Sex Pistols

Dennis Morris is a British photographer, best known for his images of Bob Marley and the Sex Pistols.

From 5 February to 18 May 2025, the Maison européenne de la photographie in Paris, France, showed Music + Life, a retrospective of Morris's work from London as well as portraits of Bob Marley and the Sex Pistols.

From 27 June to 28 September 2025, the Photographers' Gallery in London showed Morris' retrospective Music + Life.

== Life and work ==
In 1973, Morris, then at school in London, heard that Bob Marley was playing at the Speakeasy Club in Great Marlborough Street. He went to the club during the day, met Marley and asked to take his picture. Marley agreed, and after hearing that Morris wanted to be a photographer told him: "You are a photographer." The following day, Morris left with the band in their Transit van. He went on to photograph the musician until Marley's death in 1981.

After being approached by John Lydon personally, after their signing to Virgin Records, in May 1977, Morris spent a year with the Sex Pistols, documenting them in depth. In 1978, Morris went with Virgin boss Richard Branson on a talent-spotting trip to Jamaica. Morris persuaded Virgin that John Lydon should accompany them.

Morris describes his style as "reportage", citing as influences Robert Capa and Don McCullin. He used a Leica camera, finding that its small size meant that "you can take it anywhere, and no one takes it seriously. So you get them to open up."

In 1979, Morris created the logo for the band Public Image Limited and the innovative Metal Box album packaging. He then became art director of Island Records and designed album covers for Linton Kwesi Johnson, Marianne Faithfull (Broken English) and Bob Marley.

In mid-1979, Morris replaced Don Letts as vocalist of Basement 5, a reggae punk fusion band. He created their logo, image, photography and graphics and gained a recording contract with Island Records. Their albums, 1965–1980 and Basement in Dub, were produced by Martin Hannett in 1980 and re-released by the PIAS label in 2017.

In 2000, Morris travelled to the Philippines to photograph the crucifixion of artist Sebastian Horsley. In 2002, to mark the 40th anniversary of Jamaican independence, Morris was commissioned by BBC 2 to document reggae superstars, Jamaican street culture and the energy of the dancehall for the award-winning TV series and accompanying book Reggae: The Story of Jamaican Music.

In June 2005, the Spectrum London gallery had a show of photographs by Morris documenting the daily lives, ceremonies and rituals of the Mowanjum Community of Indigenous Australians. The gallery was blessed by tribe leader Francis Firebrace, wearing body paint and tribal dress. Morris was commissioned to show a new body of work at the Today Art Museum in Beijing in 2008 to coincide with the Olympic Cultural programme. A large installation of his punk images (part of the I am a cliché, Echoes of the Punk Aesthetic exhibition curated by Emma Lavigne) was shown at the 41st Rencontres d'Arles (France) during the summer of 2010.

In 2013, Morris collaborated with Shepard Fairey on a body of work titled S.I.D (Superman Is Dead), culminating in an exhibition at Subliminal Projects, Los Angeles, USA. In April 2014, he exhibited a large collection of his Bob Marley photographs at the Known Gallery in Los Angeles. In early 2016, BBC 4 made a documentary on his work as part of their ongoing series What do artists do all day?. In 2016, the Institute of Contemporary Arts presented an exhibition of his design, marketing, art direction and photography of Public Image Ltd. In 2018, Nowness made a short film of Dennis Morris in Tokyo for their "Photographers in Focus" series. In 2023, Morris exhibited a series of work titled Colored Black at Kyotographie International Photography Festival in Japan.

Morris's work has been used in books such as Lipstick Traces: A Secret History of the 20th Century by Greil Marcus, Century by Bruce Bernard, Punk by Steven Colgrave and Chris Sullivan, and Rolling Stone: The Complete Covers 1967–1997. Morris has been the subject of documentaries and television programmes in the UK and US.

== Collections ==
Some of Morris's photos from his Growing Up Black collection are part of the Tate Britain collection and were displayed in an exhibition titled Stan Firm inna Inglan from November 2016 to November 2017. The National Portrait Gallery in London and the London Museum also hold some of Morris' work in their permanent collection. One body of work, Southall – a home from home, was bought with help from the Heritage Lottery Fund, and is held in the archives of Gunnersbury Park Museum in London. "Growing Up Black", a collection of his photographs of the black community in Hackney is part of the permanent collection of the Hackney Museum. The Victoria and Albert Museum has also acquired some photographs from this series.

== Gallery ==
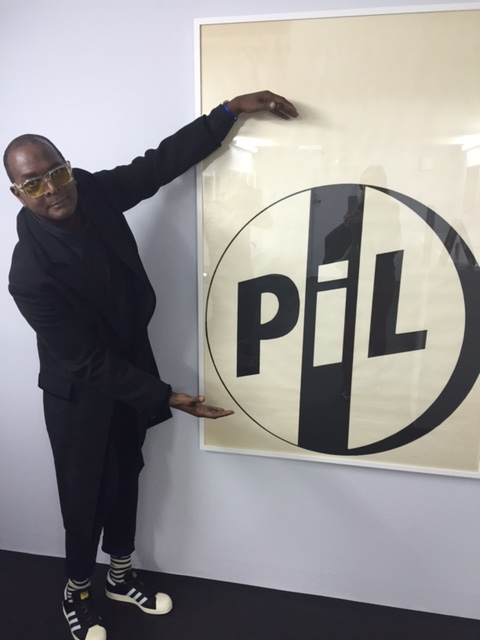
Morris at the exhibition of his work on Public Image Ltd (PIL) at the Institute of Contemporary Arts, London

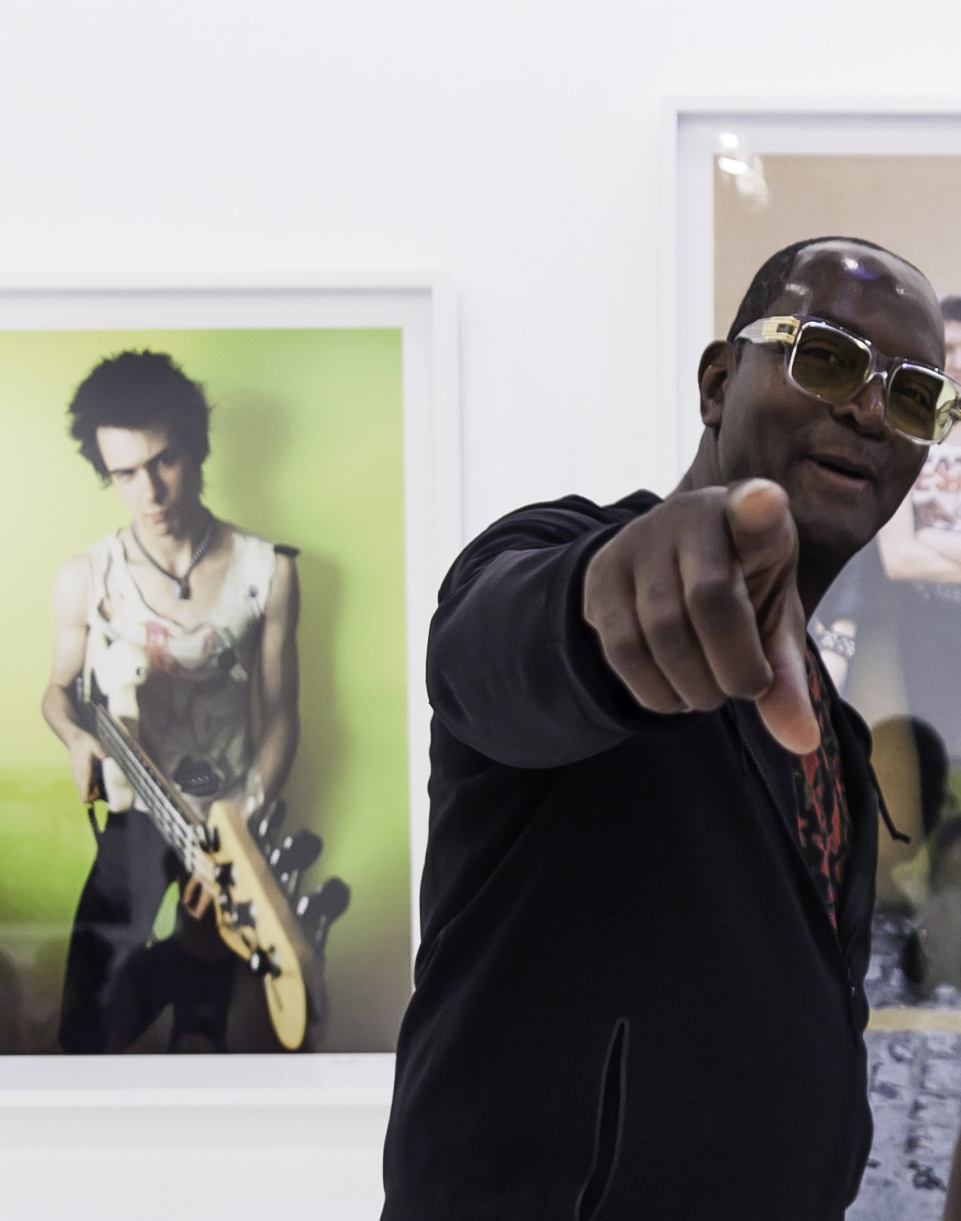
Morris at an exhibition of his work

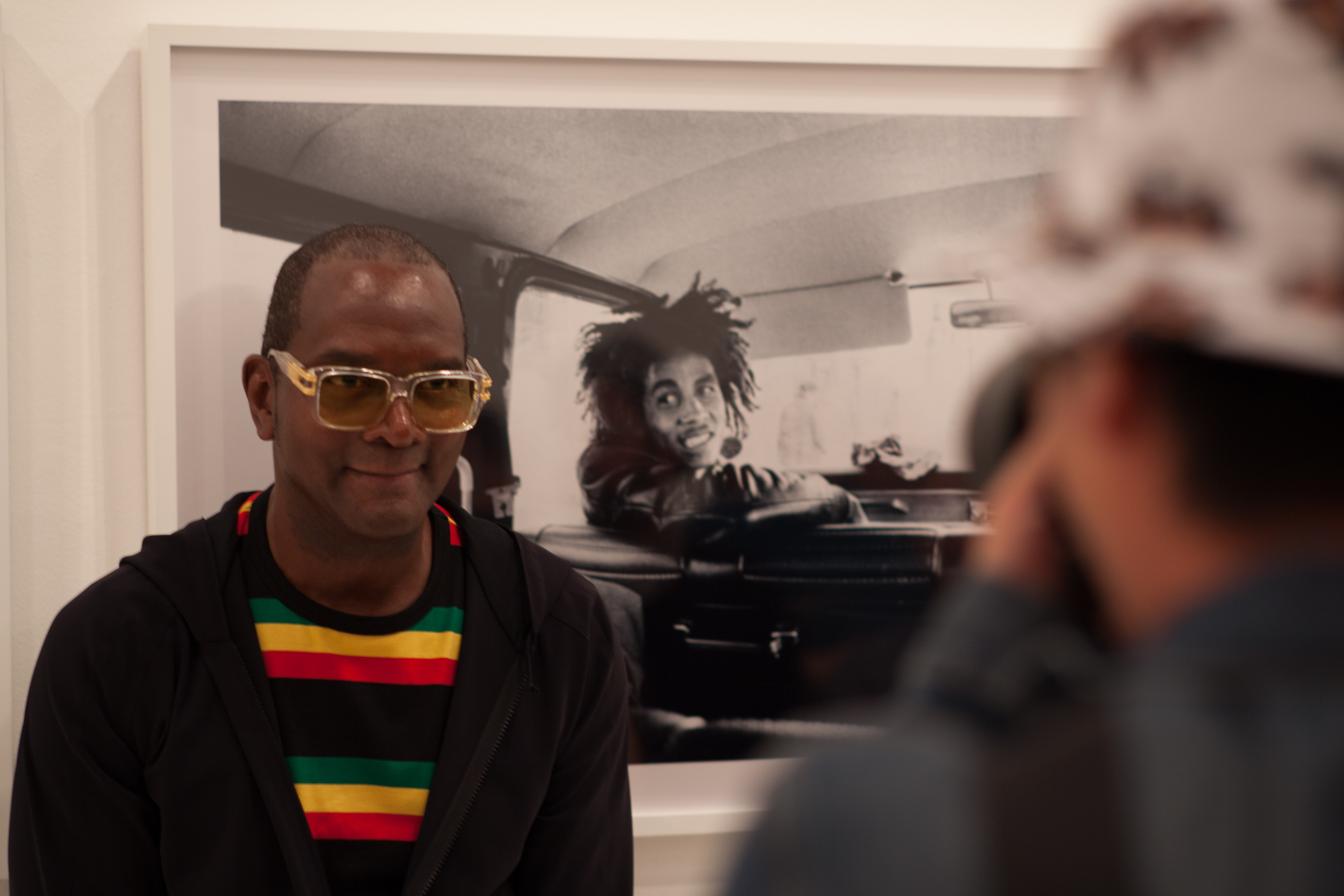
Morris in front of one of his photos of Bob Marley

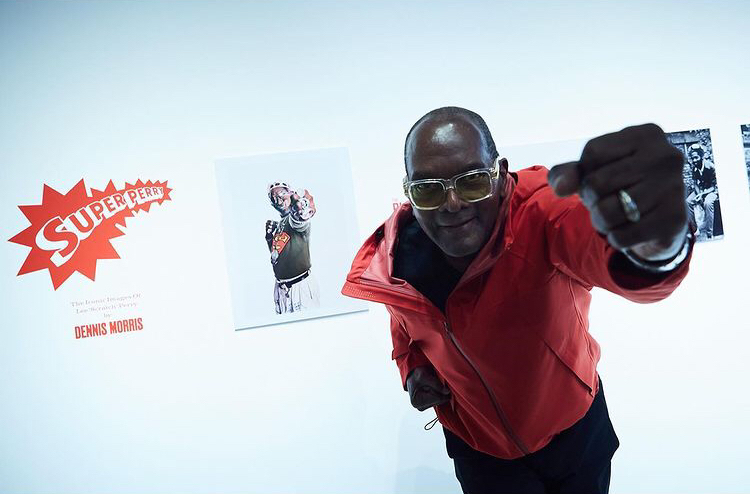
Morris at his Super Perry exhibition in Tokyo June 2022

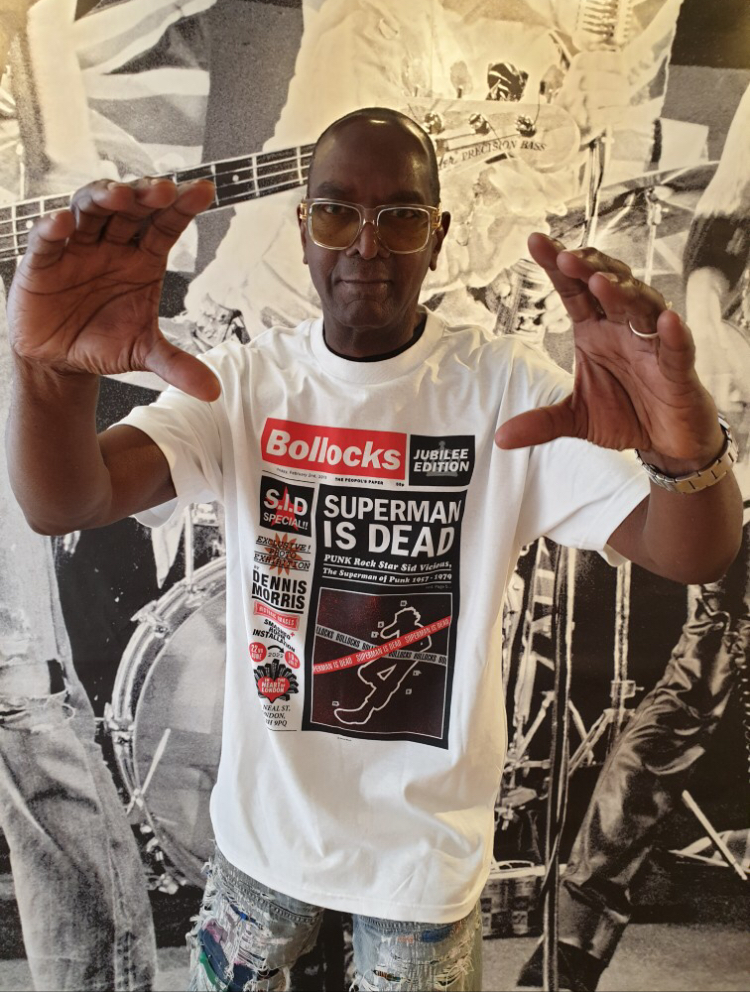
Morris at his Superman Is Dead (S*I*D) show in London 2022

== Books ==
- Destroy: Sex Pistols 1977. Creation Books, 1998. ISBN 1-84068-058-X.
- Bob Marley: A Rebel Life: A Photobiography 1973–1980. Plexus Publishing, 1999. ISBN 0-85965-268-8.
- Southall – a Home from Home. Olympus, 1999. ISBN 1-84068-054-7.
- A Bitta PIL. Parco Publishing, 2011. ISBN 978-4-89194-890-0.
- Growing Up Black. Autograph ABP, 2012. ISBN 978-1-899282-14-2.
- This is the one: a photo essay on the rise of the Stone Roses. WSI, 2012. ISBN 978-0-9572471-0-9.
- "Resurrection." Space Shower Books, 2013. ISBN 978-4906700912.
- The Bollocks: a photo essay of the Sex Pistols. Zero + Publishing, 2014. ISBN 978-1-937222-40-6.
- Super Perry: The Iconic Images of Lee Scratch Perry. TANG DENG Co., 2022. ISBN 9784908749339.
- "Colored Black" HeHe, 2023. ISBN 9784908062520.
- "Portraits of the King", photographs of Bob Marley, TANG DENG Co.,2023 ISBN 9784908749445.
- Music + Life Thames & Hudson, 2025. ISBN 9780500028377.

== Album sleeves photography and design ==
- (1975) Bob Marley: Live at the Lyceum, cover photography
- (1976) The Mighty Diamonds: Right Time, photography
- (1978) XTC: White Music, photography
- (1978) Public Image Ltd: Public Image: First Issue, photography and concept design.
- (1979) Judy Mowatt: "Black Woman", photography.
- (1979) Marianne Faithfull: Broken English, photography and concept design
- (1980) Pablo Moses: "a song," photography and concept design
- (1980) Linton Kwesi Johnson: LKJ in Dub, concept design
- (1980) Linton Kwesi Johnson: "Bass Culture", sleeve concept and design
- (1981) Basement 5: 1965–1980, photography and concept design
- (1985) Simply Red: "Money's Too Tight (to Mention)," photography and concept design
- (2003) Dillinja and Lemon D: "The Killa - Hertz", photography
- (2011) Lee Scratch Perry: The Return of Sound System Scratch, photography

== Exhibitions ==
- 2008: Timeless, Mori Tower Gallery, Tokyo, Japan.
- 2008: 8 Visions, one Dream, Today Art Museum, Beijing, China.
- 2009: Growing Up Black, Hackney Museum, London, UK.
- 2009: Marianne Faithfull: unseen images from the Broken English session, Snap Galleries, London, UK.
- 2010: Rencontres d'Arles festival, Arles, France.
- 2011: A Bitta PIL, PARCO Factory, Tokyo, Japan.
- 2012: No, collaboration with Tim Noble and Sue Webster, Vinyl Factory, London, UK.
- 2013: SID (Superman Is Dead), collaboration with Shepard Fairey, Subliminal Projects, Los Angeles, USA.
- 2014: Bob Marley: Giant, Known Gallery, Los Angeles, USA.
- 2014: The Bollocks, Known Gallery, Los Angeles, USA.
- 2015: Staying Power, V&A Museum, London, UK (group show)
- 2016: PiL first issue to Metal Box, ICA, London, UK
- 2016: "Punk in Britain", Galleria Carla Sozzani, Milan, Italy (group show)
- 2017: "Stan Firm inna ingland", Tate Britain, London, UK, (group show)
- 2018: "Liam Gallagher, Rock'n'Roll Star", BookMarc, Tokyo, Japan
- 2020: "Dub London", Museum of London, London, UK
- 2021: "Life Between Islands", Tate Britain, London, UK
- 2022: "Super Perry" the iconic images of Lee Scratch Perry, BookMarc, Tokyo, Japan
- 2022: "Superman Is Dead" on Sid Vicious, Covent Garden, London, UK
- 2022: "Super Perry" the iconic images of Lee Scratch Perry, 30 Old Burlington Street, London, UK
- 2023: "Colored Black", Kyotographie, Kyoto, Japan
- 2023: "Portraits of the King" Agnes b Galerie Boutique, Tokyo, Japan
- 2023/2024: "Colored Black", Galerie du Jour, Paris, France
- 2025: Music + Life, Maison européenne de la photographie, Paris, 5 February — 18 May 2025. A retrospective, with photographs from his youth in London, as well as portraits of Bob Marley and the Sex Pistols.
- 2025: "Music + Life" tours to the Photographers Gallery, London, from 27 June to 28 September.
