= Megatop Phoenix =

Studio album by Big Audio Dynamite
- Released: 4 September 1989
- Studio: Konk Studios (Hornsey, London)
- Genre: Alternative dance; acid house; alternative rock
- Length: 59:05
- Label: CBS
- Producer: Mick Jones; Bill Price

Big Audio Dynamite chronology
Tighten Up, Vol. 88 (1988)	Megatop Phoenix (1989)	Kool-Aid (1990)

Singles from Megatop Phoenix
- 1. "James Brown" b/w "If I Were John Carpenter" Released: 1989; 2. "Contact" b/w "In Full Effect" Released: October 1989

Professional ratings
Review scores
Source	Rating
AllMusic	3.5/5 stars
Christgau's Record Guide	C+

Megatop Phoenix is the fourth and final studio album by the original line-up of the English band Big Audio Dynamite, released on 4 September 1989 by CBS Records. Mick Jones and Bill Price produced the album. It was recorded at the Kinks' Konk Studios in Hornsey, London, who were considered an inspiration in the album's liner notes.

Megatop Phoenix was the last album to be released under the name of Big Audio Dynamite for six years (until 1995's F-Punk). A year after this album's release Mick Jones formed Big Audio Dynamite II with totally different members. The phoenix in the title is a reference to a near-death experience of Jones, who had developed chickenpox and pneumonia, and spent several months in hospital prior to recording this album.

The album reached #26 on the UK album chart and #85 on the Billboard 200 albums in the USA.

== Track listing ==
Side one
No.	Title	Writer(s)	Length
1.	"Start"	Big Audio Dynamite	0:14
2.	"Rewind"	Big Audio Dynamite	4:35
3.	"All Mink & No Manners"	Big Audio Dynamite	0:41
4.	"Union, Jack"	Jones, Letts, Williams	6:04
5.	"Contact"	Jones, Donovan	4:42
6.	"Dragon Town"	Jones, Letts, Roberts, Williams	4:46
7.	"Baby, Don't Apologise"	Jones, Letts	4:51
8.	"Is Yours Working Yet?"	Big Audio Dynamite	1:03
9.	"Around the Girl in 80 Ways"	Jones, Letts	3:30

Side two
No.	Title	Writer(s)	Length
10.	"James Brown"	Jones, Letts	5:08
11.	"Everybody Needs a Holiday"	Jones, Letts	5:33
12.	"Mick's a Hippie Burning"	Big Audio Dynamite	2:31
13.	"House Arrest"	Jones, Letts, Roberts, Donovan	3:59
14.	"The Green Lady"	Jones, Letts, Roberts	3:43
15.	"London Bridge"	Jones, Letts, Roberts	3:50
16.	"Stalag 123"	Jones, Letts, Roberts	3:11
17.	"End"	Big Audio Dynamite	0:34
Total length:			59:05

== Samples ==
The album makes copious use of sampling from various musical and other sources. Many of the tracks listed are created mainly from samples. Some of the samples are identified with their source below.

- "Start" – Opening moments of Powell and Pressburger's A Matter of Life and Death
- "Rewind" – Much of what is being tape-rewound during the latter part of the song is from "Stalag 123"
- "Union, Jack" – Rule Britannia, Charlie Watts' drum opening from the Rolling Stones' "Honky Tonk Women", Richard II, "You wouldn't know Karl Marx from a toffee apple" – from the film Britannia Hospital and "Heritage in motion" etc. from The Knack ...and How to Get It
- "Contact" – Brief use of the beginning to "I Can't Explain" by the Who
- "Dragon Town" – George Formby from "Mr Wu's a window cleaner now" and 'aaah aaah' portion of "S.F. Sorrow Is Born" by the Pretty Things
- "Is Yours Working Yet?" – Alfred Hitchcock
- "Around the Girl in 80 Ways" – "Right Said Fred" by Bernard Cribbins
- "James Brown" – "Living in America" by James Brown
- "Mick's a Hippie Burning" – The Hole in the Ground, again by Bernard Cribbins and Withnail and I
- "The Green Lady" – Snippet of instrumental break from "S.F. Sorrow Is Born" by the Pretty Things
- "London Bridge" – "London Pride" by Noël Coward
- "Stalag 123" – The Great Escape Theme Music
- "End" – Listen with Mother

According to the NME review on 2/9/1989, there are also samples of Arthur Scargill and BAD interviews.

== Personnel ==
Big Audio Dynamite

- Mick Jones – vocals, guitar, producer
- Don Letts – sound effects, vocals
- Greg Roberts – drums, vocals
- Leo 'E-Zee-Kill' Williams – bass, vocals
- Dan Donovan – keyboards, photography, vocals

Technical

- Adam "Flea" Newman – sound effects
- Bill Price – producer, engineer, mixing
- George Holt – assistant engineer, mixing assistant
- Andy Strange – compilation assistant
