= Just Play Music! =

Single by Big Audio Dynamite

from the album Tighten Up Vol. 88
- B-side: "Much Worse"
- Released: May 1988
- Recorded: 1988
- Studio: Beethoven St. (West London)
- Genre: Post-punk
- Length: 3:55 (Edit); 4:11 (LP Version)
- Label: CBS
- Songwriters: Mick Jones; Don Letts; Greg Roberts
- Producer: Mick Jones

Big Audio Dynamite singles chronology
"Sightsee M.C!" (1987)	"Just Play Music!" (1988)	"Other 99" (1988)

Music video
- "Just Play Music!" on YouTube

"Just Play Music!" is a song by the English band Big Audio Dynamite, released in May 1988 as the first single from their third studio album, Tighten Up Vol. 88 (1988). The edit of "Just Play Music!" omits Don Letts' rapping from the outro and some of the samples.

In the US, it was the second song to top Billboard's then-new Modern Rock Tracks chart.

A heavily edited version of the single's B-side, "Much Worse", is used as the introduction of WBAI's talk radio programme "Off the Hook".

== Track listing ==
7-inch single (CBS BAAD 4)

1. "Just Play Music!" – 3:55
2. "Much Worse" – 2:45

12-inch single (1) (CBS BAAD T4)

1. "Just Play Music! (Extended Mix)" – 8:08
2. "Much Worse (Extended Mix)" – 6:45

12-inch single (2) (CBS BAAD QT4)

1. "Just Play Music! (Extended Remix)" – 5:51
2. "Much Worse (Extended Mix)" – 5:23

CD single (CBS CD BAAD 4)

1. "Just Play Music! (Extended Mix)" – 8:08
2. "Much Worse (Extended Mix)" – 6:45
3. "The Bottom Line" – 4:38

== Charts ==
Chart (1988)	Peak position
Italy Airplay (Music & Media)	14
New Zealand RIANZ Singles Chart	49
UK Singles Chart	51
US Billboard Modern Rock Tracks	1
US Billboard Hot Dance Club Play	45

== See also ==
- List of Billboard Modern Rock Tracks number ones of the 1980s
