= This Is Big Audio Dynamite =

Studio album by Big Audio Dynamite
- Released: 1 November 1985
- Studios: Sarm West (West London); Redan Recorders (West London)
- Genres: Alternative dance; post-punk; dance-punk; experimental rock; sampledelia
- Length: 43:09
- Label: Columbia
- Producer: Mick Jones

Big Audio Dynamite chronology
This Is Big Audio Dynamite (1985)	No. 10, Upping St. (1986)

Singles from This is Big Audio Dynamite
- 1. "The Bottom Line" Released: October 1985; 2. "E=MC²" Released: March 1986; 3. "Medicine Show" Released: June 1986

Professional ratings
Review scores
Source	Rating
AllMusic	4/5 stars
Christgau's Record Guide	B−
The Encyclopedia of Popular Music	4/5 stars
The Great Rock Discography	7/10
Mojo	3/5 stars
MusicHound	4/5
PopMatters	7/10
Record Mirror	4/5
The Rolling Stone Album Guide	3/5 stars
Smash Hits	7/10

This Is Big Audio Dynamite is the debut studio album by the English band Big Audio Dynamite, led by Mick Jones, the former lead guitarist and co-lead vocalist of the Clash. It was released on 1 November 1985 by Columbia Records. The album peaked at No. 27 on the UK Albums Chart and at No. 103 on the Billboard 200, and was certified gold by the British Phonographic Industry (BPI). Three singles were released from the album, all of which charted in the UK. "The Bottom Line" released a month before the album as the lead single, barely made the Top 100, peaking at No. 97, becoming their lowest charting single, whereas its follow-up single "E=MC²" released in 1986, became their only Top 20 hit, peaking at No. 11, and becoming their best-selling single. The final single from the album, "Medicine Show" also released in 1986, became their last single to chart within the Top 40 under the original line-up, peaking at No. 29. The music video for "Medicine Show", directed by Don Letts, featured two other former members of the Clash, Joe Strummer and Paul Simonon as police officers as well as Neneh Cherry and Andi Oliver of the band Rip Rig + Panic, and John Lydon of the Sex Pistols and Public Image Ltd.

A remastered Legacy Edition was released in 2010 with a second disc composed of alternate mixes and versions. In 2016, independent vinyl reissue label Intervention Records reissued the album on 180-gram vinyl.

== Album cover ==
The album's cover depicts most of the band dressed in cowboy clothing as a four piece band, minus keyboardist Dan Donovan who took and designed the photo.

== Critical reception ==
Lenny Kaye at Spin said, " It's not an easy album and rewards repeated listenings. The beat-box rhythms, the sing-along choruses, the special effects and voice-overs, the impressionistic lyrics whose scattered imagery creates its effect through cumulative force rather than narrative—we are far removed from the Clash's explicit political statements."

== Track listing ==
All tracks are written by Mick Jones and Don Letts, except where noted.

Side one
No.	Title	Writer(s)	Length
1.	"Medicine Show"		6:29
2.	"Sony"		4:30
3.	"E=MC²"		5:54
4.	"The Bottom Line"	Mick Jones	4:35

Side two
No.	Title	Length
5.	"A Party"	6:40
6.	"Sudden Impact!"	5:03
7.	"Stone Thames"	4:05
8.	"BAD"	5:54
Total length:		43:09

2010 Legacy Edition bonus tracks
No.	Title	Length
1.	"Medicine Show" (12-inch remix)	7:10
2.	"Sony Dub"	4:15
3.	"E=MC2" (12-inch remix)	6:31
4.	"The Bottom Line" (12-inch remix, edit version)	7:20
5.	"A Party Dub"	7:01
6.	"Sudden Impact" (12-inch mix)	6:07
7.	"Stone Thames" (12-inch mix)	6:18
8.	"BAD" (Vocoder version)	6:28
9.	"Electric Vandal"	3:22
10.	"Albert Einstein Meets the Human Beatbox"	5:35
11.	"BAD" (US 12-inch remix)	6:16
12.	"This Is Big Audio Dynamite" (7-inch non-LP B-side)	3:44

== Personnel ==
Credits are adapted from the This Is Big Audio Dynamite liner notes.

Big Audio Dynamite

- Mick Jones – vocals, guitars
- Don Letts – vocals, FX
- Dan Donovan – keyboards
- Leo "E-Zee Kill" Williams – bass, backing vocals
- Greg Roberts – drums, drum machine, backing vocals
- Adam "Flea" Newman – "dynamite"

Production and artwork

- Mick Jones – producer
- Paul "Groucho" Smykle – engineer; mixing
- Johnny Shinas – assistant engineer at Redan Recorders
- Renny Hill – assistant engineer at Sarm West Studios
- Dan Donovan – sleeve artwork; photography

== Samples used on the album ==
Medicine Show

Sampled liberally throughout this song are sound bites from four motion pictures, three of them Spaghetti Westerns. This list is based on order of appearance.

- "Get three coffins ready." (Clint Eastwood from 1964's A Fistful of Dollars)
- "Who the hell is that? One bastard goes in and another comes out....I'm innocent of everything!" (Eli Wallach from 1966's The Good, the Bad and the Ugly)
- "You makin' some kinda joke?" (A Fistful of Dollars)
- "I don't think it's nice, you laughin'." (Eastwood from A Fistful of Dollars)
- "Wanted in fourteen counties of this State, the condemned is found guilty of crimes of murder, armed robbery of citizens, state banks and post offices, the theft of sacred objects, arson in a state prison, perjury, bigamy, deserting his wife and children, inciting prostitution, kidnapping, extortion, receiving stolen goods, selling stolen goods, passing counterfeit money, and contrary to the laws of this State, the condemned is guilty of using marked cards and loaded dice. Therefore, according to the powers vested in us, we sentence the accused here before us, Tuco Benedicto Pacifico Juan Maria Ramirez ('Known as The Rat') and any other aliases he might have, to hang by the neck until dead. May God have mercy on his soul. Proceed." (The Good, the Bad and the Ugly; "Known as The Rat" was uttered by Eastwood.)
- Ennio Morricone's main theme to The Good, the Bad and the Ugly.
- "Duck, you sucker!" (James Coburn from 1971's Duck, You Sucker!)
- "I don't have to show you any stinkin' badges!" (Alfonso Bedoya from 1948's The Treasure of the Sierra Madre)
- Laughter from The Treasure of the Sierra Madre.

Sony

- Joe Strummer crowing from the Clash's 1979 song "London Calling"

E=MC²

- Several samples from the cult film Performance (1970) directed by Donald Cammell and Nicolas Roeg. The music video mirrors the reference by using clips from several of Roeg's films, including Don't Look Now (1973) and The Man Who Fell to Earth (1976).

Sudden Impact

- The two note choral motif (Aaah aaah) heard throughout the song is a sample of the Close Encounters of the Third Kind (1977) soundtrack.
