= SecondLight =

Second Light or SecondLight may refer to:

- Second Light, a 1995 album by the British band Dreadzone
- SecondLight, a Microsoft technology that is similar to Microsoft PixelSense
- Second Light, a mission plan for the Kepler space telescope
