= Sound (Dreadzone album) =

Studio album by Dreadzone
- Released: 2001
- Label: Ruff Life
- Producer: Dreadzone

Dreadzone chronology
Biological Radio (1997)	Sound (2001)	Once Upon a Time (2005)

Sound is the fourth studio album by the British electronic music band Dreadzone, released in 2001 by Ruff Life Records.

== Track listing ==
1. "Return of the Dread" - (6:22)
2. "Crazy Knowledge" - (5:20)
3. "Mean Old World" - (6:02)
4. "Black Rock and Roll" - (5:15)
5. "Straight to a Soundboy" - (6:05)
6. "Digital Mastermind" - (5:08)
7. "Different Planets" - (7:19)
8. "Dread'Pon Sound" - (6:42)
9. "Believing in It" - (5:42)
10. "The Last Dance" - (7:25)

== Personnel ==
- Greg Roberts
- Tim Bran
- Leo Williams
- Rob Marche – guitar on "Mean Old World" and "Black Rock and Roll"
- Don Letts
- Sorel Johnson – vocals on "Believing in It"
- Brinsley Forde – vocals on "Return of the Dread"
- MC Spee (Spencer Graham) – vocals on "Return of the Dread"
- MC Det (Joseph Ellington) – vocals on "Black Rock and Roll"
- Earl Sixteen – vocals on "Digital Mastermind", "Different Planets", and "The Last Dance"
- Donna McKevitt – vocals on "Different Planets"
- Steve Roberts – guitar on "Believing in It"
