= Tighten Up Vol. 88 =

Studio album by Big Audio Dynamite
- Released: June 1988
- Recorded: Spring 1988
- Studio: Beethoven St. (West London)
- Genres: Pop rock; alternative dance; post-punk; new wave
- Length: 46:09
- Label: Columbia
- Producer: Mick Jones

Big Audio Dynamite chronology
| No. 10, Upping St. (1986) | Tighten Up Vol. 88 (1988) | Megatop Phoenix (1989) |

Singles from Tighten Up, Vol. 88
- 1. "Just Play Music!" b/w "Much Worse" Released: May 1988; 2. "Other 99" b/w "What Happened to Eddie?" Released: July 1988

Professional ratings
Review scores
| Source | Rating |
|---|---|
| AllMusic | 2/5 stars |
| The Encyclopedia of Popular Music | 3/5 stars |
| The New Rolling Stone Album Guide | 4/5 stars |

Tighten Up Vol. 88 is the third studio album by the English band Big Audio Dynamite, released in June 1988 by Columbia Records. The album peaked at No. 33 on the UK Albums Chart and at No. 102 on the Billboard 200 but was their first not to receive a certification.

The album derives its name from the Tighten Up compilation album series by Trojan Records. The album's cover artwork was designed by musician Paul Simonon, the former bassist for the Clash, of whom Mick Jones was a member. Big Audio Dynamite's keyboardist Dan Donovan took the back cover photo with Josh Cheuse.

== Track listing ==
Side one
| No. | Title | Writer(s) | Length |
|---|---|---|---|
| 1. | "Rock Non Stop (All Night Long)" | Dan Donovan; Mick Jones; Don Letts | 3:38 |
| 2. | "Other 99" | Jones; Letts | 4:49 |
| 3. | "Funny Names" | Jones; Letts | 2:29 |
| 4. | "Applecart" | Jones; Greg Roberts | 4:21 |
| 5. | "Esquerita" | Jones | 2:09 |
| 6. | "Champagne" | Donovan; Jones | 4:40 |

Side two
| No. | Title | Writer(s) | Length |
|---|---|---|---|
| 7. | "Mr. Walker Said" | Jones; Letts; Roberts | 4:31 |
| 8. | "The Battle of All Saints Road" | Jones; Letts | 5:13 |
| 9. | "Hip, Neck & Thigh" | Jones; Letts | 2:44 |
| 10. | "2000 Shoes" | Donovan; Letts; Roberts | 3:20 |
| 11. | "Tighten Up, Vol. 88" | Jones; Letts; Roberts; Leo Williams | 4:04 |
| 12. | "Just Play Music!" | Jones; Letts; Roberts | 4:11 |
| Total length: | | | 46:09 |

== Samples used on the album ==
- "The Battle of All Saints Road" includes "Battle of New Orleans" (Traditional) and "Dueling Banjos" (Arthur Smith)
- The ending of "Champagne" includes an audio sample from the fantasy romantic drama film A Matter of Life and Death (1946) starring David Niven and Kim Hunter. "Tea break! Here we get it at 5!"

== Personnel ==
Credits are adapted from the Tighten Up Vol. 88 liner notes.

Big Audio Dynamite

- Mick Jones — vocals, guitar
- Don Letts — sound effects, vocals
- Dan Donovan — keyboards, vocals
- Greg Roberts — drums, vocals
- Leo "E-Zee Kill" Williams — bass, vocals

Production and artwork

- Mick Jones — producer
- Adam "Flea" Newman — "dynamite"
- Adele — crew
- Josh — Grand Poo-Bah
- Tricia — public relations
- Paul "Groucho" Smykle — engineer
- Paul Simonon — cover painting
