= 1965–1980 =

Studio album by Basement 5
- Released: 1980
- Recorded: August 1980
- Studio: Basing Street Studios, London
- Label: Antilles, Island
- Producer: Martin Hannett

Basement 5 chronology
1965–1980 (1980)	In Dub (1980)

Professional ratings
Review scores
Source	Rating
Christgau's Record Guide	B+
Trouser Press	mixed

1965–1980 is the sole studio album by Basement 5, released in 1980 by record label Antilles. It was produced by Martin Hannett. Original drummer Tony Thompson left the band on the first day of the album sessions. Session musician Charley Charles played drums on the album and got a "special thanks" in the album credits. New drummer Richard Dudanski who joined after the recording got a band member credit.

== Track listing ==
All lyrics and rhythms by Basement 5 (Tony Thompson, Dennis Morris, Herman Ezekiel "Leo" Williams and Humphrey "JR" Murray)

1. "Riot"
2. "No Ball Games"
3. "Hard Work"
4. "Immigration"
5. "Last White Christmas"
6. "Heavy Traffic"
7. "Union Games"
8. "Too Soon"
9. "Omega Man"

== Personnel ==
Basement 5

- Dennis Morris - vocals
- J.R. - guitar
- Leo Williams - bass
- Richard Dudanski - drums
- Charley Charles - drums

Technical

- Chris Nagle - engineer
- Kris Needs - management
- Neil Clitheroe - design coordination
- Dennis Morris - sleeve concept and design, photography

"Special thanks: Charles Charles - Trevor Spencer - Chris Blackwell - Denise Mills - Annie Roseberry - Rob Partridge - Glorious Gloria."
