= 360° (Dreadzone album) =

Studio album by Dreadzone
- Released: 1993
- Recorded: Spring 1993
- Genre: Reggae, dub, trance
- Length: 58:42
- Label: Creation CRECD 162
- Producer: Dread Zone

Dreadzone chronology
360° (1993)	Second Light (1995)

Professional ratings
Review scores
Source	Rating
AllMusic	4/5 stars

360°, also known as Dread Zone... ...360° is the first album by the British band Dreadzone. It was released in 1993 on Creation Records and set forth the combination of dub, trance, and reggae for which Dreadzone was to become well known. Although unsuccessful in the charts, the album attracted the attention of John Peel, who gave it significant airplay.

The album cover is highly similar to the early covers in The Best Dance Album in the World... Ever! series.

== Track listing ==
No.	Title	Writer(s)	Length
1.	"House of Dread"	Letts, Roberts, Williams	5:04
2.	"L.O.V.E."	Roberts, Bran	7:09
3.	"Chinese Ghost Story"	Mah, Roberts	6:09
4.	"The Good the Bad and the Dread"	Morricone, Roberts	6:51
5.	"The Warning"	Roberts, Bran	7:05
6.	"Dream On"	Roberts	7:05
7.	"Far Encounter"	Roberts	8:22
8.	"Skeleton at the Feast"	Roberts	5:38
9.	"Rastafarout"	Roberts, Bran	7:01

== Samples and influences ==
- "L.O.V.E." begins with a sample of dialogue from Night of the Hunter (1955), spoken by Robert Mitchum:

"L-O-V-E! You see these fingers, dear hearts? These fingers has veins that run straight to the soul of man. The right hand, friends, the hand of love. Now watch, and I'll show you the story of life".

The dialogue "We're going to have an orgasm that you can't even comprehend" is an extract from Diane Keaton's documentary Heaven. Piano fragments are sampled from "Moments in Love" by Art of Noise. The closing words "And what is love? ....Love is the inspiration of poets and philosophers. Love is the voice of music" are spoken by Burt Lancaster in the 1960 film Elmer Gantry.

- "The Good, the Bad and the Dread" "When you hear a strange sound, drop to the ground" is spoken by Charles Bronson in the 1968 film Once Upon a Time in the West. Musical samples are taken from Ennio Morricone's score for For a Few Dollars More (1965).
- "The Warning" The opening dialogue section

Don't move.
That's what you get for messin' with the police
Hands behind your heads, interlock your fingers, down on your knees. Let's go

is taken from the 1988 film Colors. A snatch of dialogue from Rocky ("Ooh! Ahh! Come on!") is used as a rhythmic trope.

- "Dream On" samples a cry "Marijuana!" from the 1970 film Woodstock.
- "Skeleton at the Feast": "Like a little grain of gold glittering in sand" and other snatches of dialogue are from the 1936 film The Man Who Could Work Miracles.

== Personnel ==
- Greg Roberts – keyboards, synthesizer, programming
- Tim Bran – keyboards, synthesizer, programming, mixing, engineering
- Melanie Guillaume – vocals
- Deborah Irie – vocals
- Dan Donovan – keyboards
- Alison Goldfrapp – vocals (tracks 4, 7)
- Ted Hayton – editing
