= Terence Donovan (photographer) =

English photographer (1936–1996)

Terence Donovan FRPS
- Donovan in the summer of 1996
- Born: Terence Daniel Donovan; 14 September 1936; Stepney, East London, England
- Died: 22 November 1996 (aged 60); London, England
- Occupations: Photographer; film director
- Children: 3, including Dan and Daisy

Terence Daniel Donovan FRPS (14 September 1936 – 22 November 1996) was an English photographer and film director, noted for his fashion photography of the 1960s. A book of his fashion work, Terence Donovan Fashion, was published 2012. He also directed many TV commercials and oversaw the music videos for Robert Palmer's "Addicted to Love" and "Simply Irresistible". The Guardian labelled “Addicted to Love“ as being "fashion's favourite video" since it was released.

== Early life and education ==
Donovan was born in Stepney in the East End of London to lorry driver Daniel Donovan and (Lilian) Constance Violet (née Wright), a cook. He took his first photo at the age of 15. He had a fractured education, but between the ages of 11 and 15 studied at the London County Council School of Photoengraving and Lithography.

== Career ==
The bomb-damaged industrial landscape of his home town became the backdrop of much of his fashion photography, and he set the trend for positioning fashion models in stark and gritty urban environments. Flats and gasometers were popular settings, and he often had the models adopt adventurous poses. He wedged one model up the side of a building, and photographed another as she posed dangling from a parachute.

Along with David Bailey and Brian Duffy (nicknamed by Norman Parkinson the 'Black Trinity'), he captured, and in many ways helped create, the Swinging London of the 1960s: a culture of high fashion and celebrity chic. The trio of photographers socialised with actors, musicians and royalty, and found themselves elevated to celebrity status. Together, they were the first real celebrity photographers. He joined the Royal Photographic Society in 1963, gaining his Associate in 1963 and Fellowship in 1968.

In the early 1970s Donovan branched out into film production and it was during this period that he moved his studio to 30 Bourdon Street, Mayfair, now marked by a memorial plaque.

Donovan shot for various fashion magazines, including Harper's Bazaar and Vogue, as well as directing some 3000 TV commercials, and the rarely seen 1973 cop film, Yellow Dog starring Jiro Tamiya. He also made documentaries and music videos, and painted.

== Personal life ==
Donovan was married twice. His first marriage to Janet Cohen was short-lived, but he remained married to his second wife, Diana Dare, until his death. He was the father of the musician Dan Donovan, the actress Daisy Donovan and Terry Donovan, a co-founder of Rockstar Games.

He was a black belt in judo and co-wrote a popular judo book, Fighting Judo (1985), with former World Judo Gold medallist Katsuhiko Kashiwazaki.

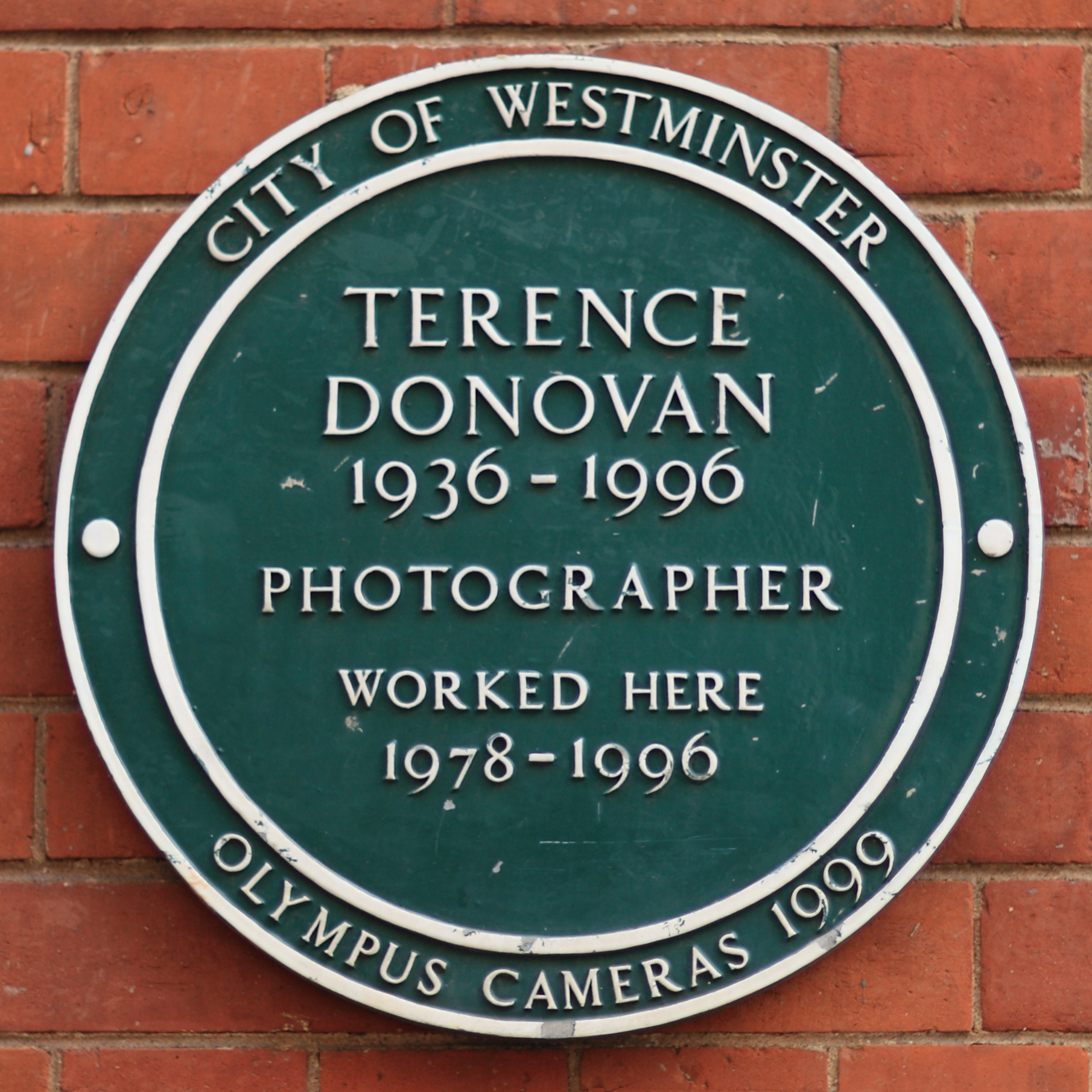
Plaque outside Donovan's former studios

== Death ==
Suffering from depression, Donovan died by suicide by hanging on 22 November 1996. His last interview appeared in a British photography magazine a few weeks after his death.
