= Alimorad Farshchian =

American physician (born 1962)

- Born: April 2, 1962 (age 64); Tehran, Iran
- Other name: A.J. Farshchian
- Education: Spartan Health Sciences University
- Known for: The Center for Regenerative Medicine
- Spouse: Maria Barba (m. 1992–2015)
- Children: 3
- Father: Mahmoud Farshchian

Alimorad Farshchian (born April 2, 1962) is an Iranian-born American medical doctor, medical author, and philanthropist. He is the founding director of The Center for Regenerative Medicine, which opened in 2000 in order to pursue pioneering regimens in the treatment of arthritis and other autoimmune diseases.

He coined the term "orthopedic regenerative medicine" and “Neuroregenesis” to characterize his groundbreaking work. Since the center's creation, he has limited himself to non-surgical orthopedics and sports medicine. For the 2012 London Olympics, Farshchian served as a consulting Orthopedic Regenerative Medicine physician for the Team USA track-and-field team. He lives in Miami, Florida.

== Education and early career ==
Farshchian earned his M.D. degree from Spartan Health Sciences University in St. Lucia in 1987. The following year, he joined the research staff at the State University of New York Downstate Medical Center in Brooklyn, New York, and the New York Research Foundation. He completed his internship at The University of Tennessee College of Medicine.

In 1994, he relocated to Philadelphia and completed additional medical education in a program affiliated with the University of Pennsylvania. He began his private medical practice in Hawaii in 1997. Two years later, he relocated to Miami.

== Career ==
In 2000, he founded The Center for Regenerative Medicine. He received Board certification in 1997. He is a member of the American Academy of Anti-Aging Medicine. Host of The Arthritis Show, the first TV series to chronicle the experiences of patients with chronic arthritis and sports injuries (2011–present).

=== Innovative treatments for neurodegenerative diseases ===
Since July 2016, Farshchian has focused on developing innovative new treatments for major neurodegenerative diseases such as dementia, Parkinson's disease and Alzheimer's disease. Parkinson' stem cells project is a non-invasive treatment he has developed uses the re-injection of stem cells taken from the patient. Preliminary research indicates the therapy can possibly improve the debilitating symptoms caused by neurodegenerative diseases. Since 2011, Farshchian has integrated the use of tai chi, yoga and qigong into his treatment plans for patients with arthritis and sports injuries. His results have demonstrated the effectiveness of additional, non-traditional therapies for many patients.

=== Treatment of Michael Jackson ===
Farshchian is best known on a worldwide basis for his treatment of pop superstar Michael Jackson, from April 2001 until December 2003. He initially treated Jackson for an ankle injury that hampered his ability to perform. Still, after a close personal friendship developed, Farshchian attempted to intervene and cure Jackson of his addiction to Demerol. Farshchian convinced Jackson and his family that an implanted chip of the medication Naltrexone, which inhibits the effects of narcotics such as Demerol, could help the singer wean himself off Demerol. The treatment was successful. During his treatment, Jackson traveled multiple times to Miami, where he stayed in a private room created for him in Farshchian's garage. Farschian also visited Jackson and his family at the celebrity's Neverland Ranch in Southern California.

Jackson's use of the general anesthetic Propofol, administered by Dr. Conrad Murray, eventually led to his death on June 25, 2009. After Jackson's death, the Sheriff of Santa Maria, California, where Neverland Ranch was located, released to the public personal letters Farshchian had sent Jackson, pleading with him to fight his addiction to Demerol. One of the letters included a package that began Jackson detoxification therapy. In March 2003, Jackson and Farshchian zeroed in on the eight-story Victoria Medical Center, a health care condominium, located at 955 N.W. Third St., in the Little Havana area of Miami as a potential location for a planned ventilator hospital project called Michael Jackson international children's hospital.

== Heal the Earth through the Arts ==
In the summer of 2017, inspired by Michael Jackson's Philanthropic work with Heal the World charity organization; Farshchian created a similar concept called "Heal the Earth through the Arts". This charity holds telethons live on Facebook; the telethons help to raise money for the homeless in Miami. Farshchian has stated in several interviews that this is his way of giving back to his community and continuing Michael Jackson's legacy.

== Personal life ==
Farshchian was married from 1992 until 2015 to Maria Barba, a marketing executive and Addy award winner; together they had two children.

In September 2016, Farshchian was engaged to singer and actress Elexis Ansley.
