= E=MC2 (song) =

"E=MC^{2}"

Single by Big Audio Dynamite

from the album This Is Big Audio Dynamite
- Released: March 1986
- Recorded: 1985
- Genre: Synth-pop; new wave
- Length: 5:55
- Label: CBS
- Songwriters: Mick Jones; Don Letts
- Producer: Mick Jones

Big Audio Dynamite singles chronology
"The Bottom Line" (1986)	"E=MC^{2}" (1986)	"Medicine Show" (1986)

Music video
- "E=MC2" on YouTube

"E=MC^{2}" is a 1986 single by the English band Big Audio Dynamite, released as the second single from their debut studio album, This Is Big Audio Dynamite (1985). The song was the band's first Top 40 hit on the UK singles chart, peaking at No. 11. Additionally, it peaked at No. 37 on the US Billboard Hot Dance Club Play chart in the United States. The song features prominent dialogue samples from the crime drama film Performance (1970). The song is also played during the opening titles of the French movie Forces spéciales (2011).

== History ==
This song was inspired by the films of Nicolas Roeg, notably Performance (1970; written and co-directed by Donald Cammell), Walkabout (1971), Don't Look Now (1973), The Man Who Fell to Earth (1976), Eureka (1983), and Insignificance (1985). Its lyrics refer directly to many of them. For example:

- The last four lines of the first verse "Man dies first reel / People ask what's the deal? / This ain't how it's supposed to be / Don't like no Aborigine" are a reference to the adventure survival film Walkabout (1971), which begins with an adult character committing suicide, which then leaves two children to survive a trek across the Australian outback, aided by a young Aboriginal male.
- The second verse (from "Took a trip to Powis Square" to "Insanity Bohemian style") refers to the two main characters in Performance (1970): a retired rock star (played by Mick Jagger) and a gangster on the run (played by James Fox)
- The third verse (from "Met a dwarf who was no good" to "Gets to take the funeral ride") describes Don't Look Now (1973), starring Donald Sutherland.
- "Space guy fell from the sky" – refers to The Man Who Fell to Earth (1976), starring David Bowie
- "Scientist eats bubble gum" – refers to Albert Einstein, a lead character in Insignificance (1985)
- "Hall of fame baseball" – refers to Joe DiMaggio, a lead character in Insignificance (1985)
- "Senator's a hoodlum" – refers to Joseph McCarthy, a lead character in Insignificance (1985)
- "King of brains" – refers to Albert Einstein, a lead character in Insignificance (1985)
- "Queen of the sack" – refers to Marilyn Monroe, a lead character Insignificance (1985)

Included throughout the song are dialogue samples from Performance (1970).

== Music video ==
The music video for the song (directed by Don Letts) features clips from films made by Nicolas Roeg, coupled with scenes of the band performing in a mine.

== Mick Jones and Hard-Fi ==
Indie rock band Hard-Fi have performed "E=MC^{2}" live, being joined by Big Audio Dynamite's lead vocalist Mick Jones on occasion. One such performance was at the Brixton Academy on 15 May 2006, a gig at which Billy Bragg and Paul Weller also appeared. On 18 May 2006, Hard-Fi were again joined onstage by Jones one song into their three-song encore for their final performance of "E=MC^{2}".

== Track listing ==
7" CBS / A 6963 (UK)

1. "E=MC^{2}" – 4:30
2. "This Is Big Audio Dynamite" – 3:39

7" Columbia / 38-06053 (US)

1. "E=MC^{2}" – 4:30
2. "A Party" – 4:44

12" CBS / TA 6963 (UK)

1. "E=MC^{2} (Extended Remix)" – 6:18 (remixed by Paul 'Groucho' Smykle)
2. "This Is Big Audio Dynamite" – 5:53

12" Columbia / 44-05909 (US)

1. "E=MC^{2} (Extended Remix)" – 5:33 (remixed by Bert Bevans)
2. "A Party" – 10:15 (remixed by Paul 'Groucho' Smykle)

== Chart positions ==
Chart (1986)	Peak position
Australia ARIA Singles Chart	47
Irish Singles Chart	11
New Zealand (Recorded Music NZ)	18
UK Singles Chart	11
US Billboard Hot Dance Club Play	37
US Billboard Hot Dance Singles Sales	41
