= Dreadzone =

British electronic music group

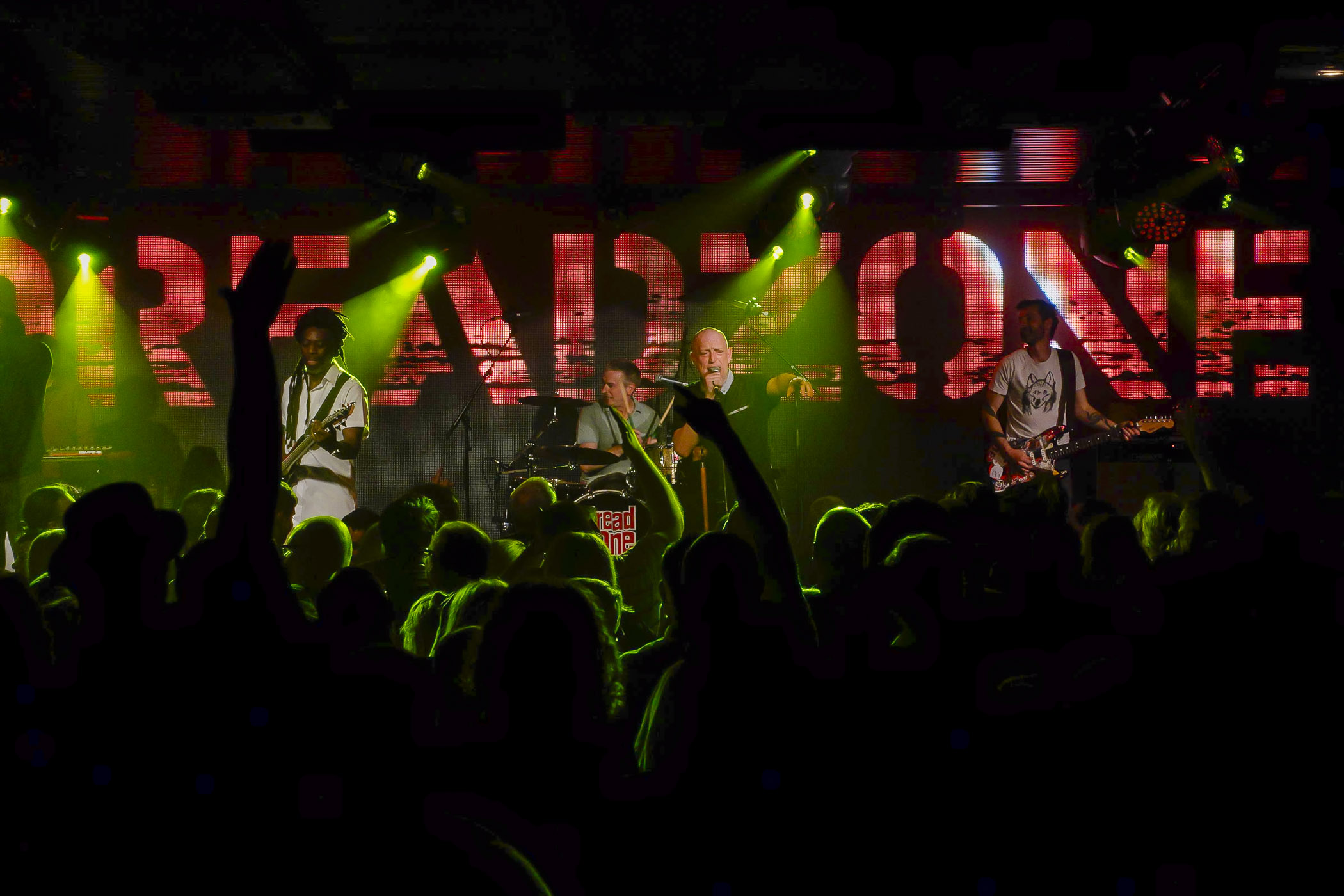
- Dreadzone performing in 2017

Background information
- Origin: London, England
- Genres: Dub; reggae; electronic; trip hop; house
- Years active: 1993–present
- Labels: Virgin; Dubwiser Records
- Members: Greg Roberts; Tim Bran; MC Spee; Earl Sixteen; Leo Williams; James Bainbridge; Blake Roberts
- Past members: Steve Roberts; Dan Donovan; Chris Oldfield; Ben Balafonic; Chris Compton
- Website: dreadzone.com

Dreadzone are a British electronic music group formed in 1993 in London by ex-Big Audio Dynamite drummer Greg Roberts and musician Tim Bran. They have released nine studio albums, two live albums, and two compilations.

They gained a reputation as a live act in 1994 and had their first UK top 40 hit in 1996, with "Little Britain". BBC Radio 1's John Peel championed the group, and they recorded three Peel sessions between 1993 and 2002. The band has experienced several lineup changes, and they have released nine studio albums throughout their career.

== History ==
Dreadzone were formed in London, England in 1993 when ex-Big Audio Dynamite drummer Greg Roberts teamed up with Tim Bran, who had previously worked as a musician and sound engineer for Julian Cope and who has done production work for artists including London Grammar, Birdy, and the Dutch duo HAEVN. The name Dreadzone was suggested to Roberts and Bran by Don Letts.

Bran and Roberts signed to Creation Records in 1993 and released their first album, 360°. They were soon joined by bassist Leo Williams and keyboardist Dan Donovan, also formerly of Big Audio Dynamite. Throughout 1994 they developed a reputation as a live act and released the limited-edition live album Performance, and in June of that year they opened the Pyramid Stage at Glastonbury. During these early years, their backing vocalists included Melanie Blatt and Alison Goldfrapp. The following year, the band signed to Virgin Records and released their second studio album, Second Light. In 1995, Earl Sixteen joined as a vocalist, singing on the single "Zion Youth". Dan Donovan left the group.

In January 1996, the group had their first and so far only Top 40 hit in the UK Singles Chart with "Little Britain", which reached No. 20. The song sampled a line from the 1968 cult British film If.... – "Britain today is a powerhouse of ideas, experiments, imagination".

John Peel championed Dreadzone on BBC Radio 1 and cited Second Light as one of his favourite albums of all time. Tracks from Second Light also dominated Peel's Festive Fifty in 1995, and the band recorded three Peel sessions between 1993 and 2001. In 1997, they released their third studio album, Biological Radio. A track from that album, "Dream Within a Dream", appeared on the soundtrack to the film The Saint.

Between 1998 and 2001, the Dreadzone sound system hosted the Dubwiser club night at Notting Hill Arts Club. During that time Roberts and Bran set up a studio together and recorded and released their fourth album, Sound, which featured Brinsley Forde and MC Spee. In 2000, MC Spee joined as a second vocalist. The album was released on the independent Rufflife label.

In 2001, Ben Balafonic joined, replacing Tim Bran. During the following years, Greg Roberts, Balafonic, Spee, Sixteen, and Steve Roberts recorded and released the fifth studio album, Once Upon a Time, in 2005, on the independent Functional label run by Biff Mitchell. The band also recorded, along with Leo Williams, the Live at Sunrise album released on Functional. In August 2006, Balafonic left the group. On 26 October 2006, Dreadzone guitarist Steve Roberts, the brother of Greg Roberts, died.

In 2007, the band were joined by new members Chris Compton and Chris Oldfield (DJ and lighting designer) and returned to touring. In 2007 and 2008, they played gigs and festivals across the UK and Europe, and signed to a new management company in 2008. In 2010, the band released their sixth studio album, Eye on the Horizon, on their own label Dubwiser.

In 2011, a compilation album was released by Dubwiser Records entitled The Good the Bad and the Dread: The Best of Dreadzone. That same year, Roberts and Williams were part of the Big Audio Dynamite reunion tour playing shows and festivals in Europe and US.

In 2012, the band recorded their seventh studio album in Mick Jones' studio, with Tim Bran returning as musician and co-producer. James 'Bazil' Bainbridge joined the group, replacing Chris Oldfield.

In 2013, a new album, Escapades, was released. In the same year, Dreadzone celebrated 20 years as a band with a short film about their history. A single, "Too Late", featuring Mick Jones, was released.

In 2016, a new album was recorded, and released as Dread Times in February 2017, and included contributions from Don Letts.

In 2022, guitarist Blake Roberts, son of Greg Roberts, joined the band.

== Discography ==
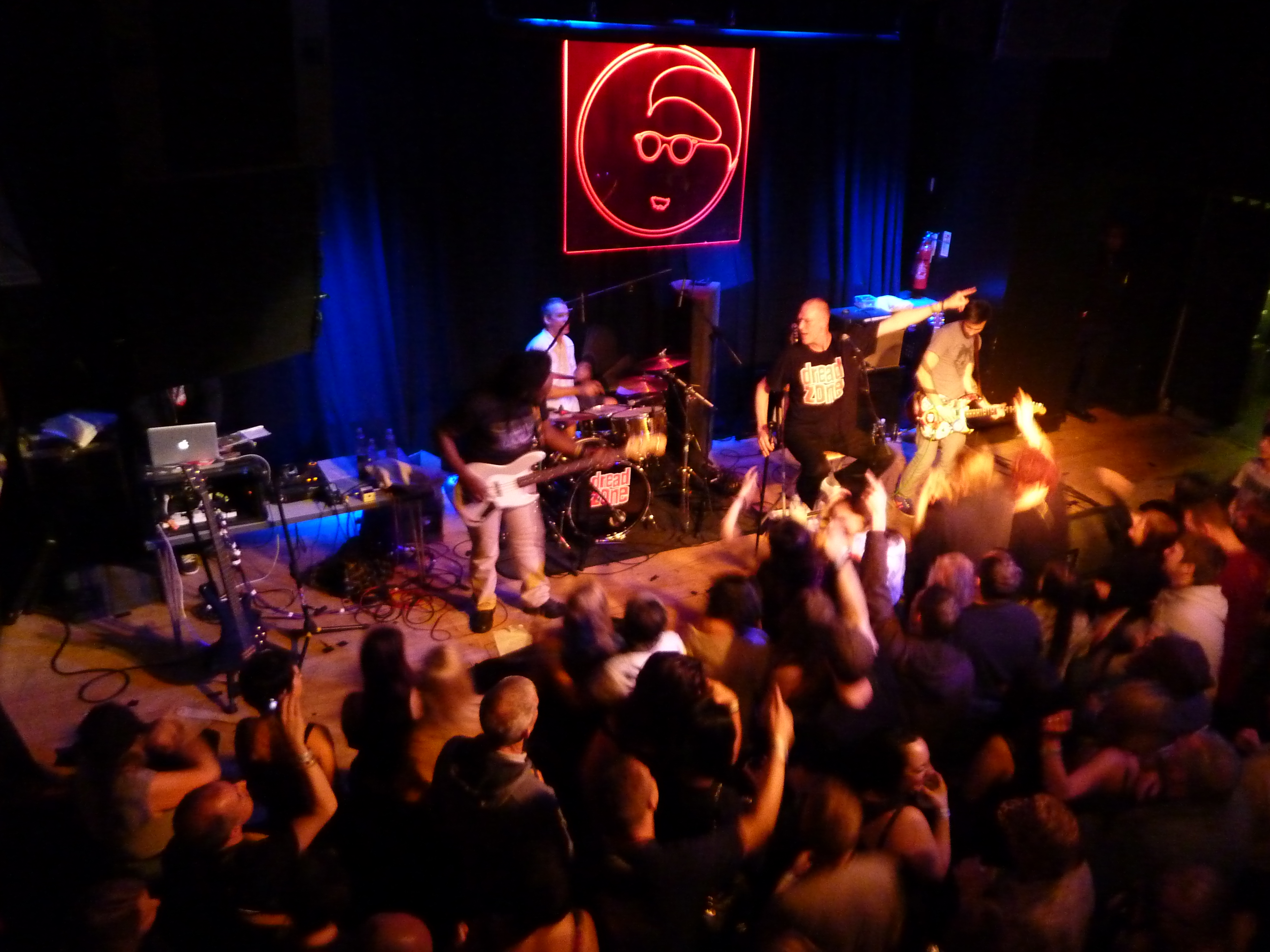
Dreadzone onstage at the Band on the Wall, Manchester, 7 December 2012

=== Studio albums ===
- 360° (1993)
- Second Light (1995)
- Biological Radio (1997)
- Sound (2001)
- Once Upon a Time (2005)
- Eye on the Horizon (2010)
- Escapades (2013)
- Dread Times (2017)
- Nine (2024)

=== EPs ===
- The Warning (1993)
- Maximum (1995)

=== Other releases ===
- Performance (1994)
- The Radio One Sessions (2001)
- Live at Sunrise (2006)
- Dreadzone: The Remixes (2007)
- The Best of Dreadzone – The Good the Bad and the Dread
- Presents Dubwiser Volume One (2019)
- Rare Mixes Vol 1 (2020)
- Dreadzone (Remixes) (2021)
- Presents Dubwiser Volume Two (2022)

=== Singles ===
- "The Good, the Bad and the Dread" (1993)
- "Dream On" / "House of Dread" (1993)
- "Fight the Power" (1994)
- "Zion Youth" (1995)
- "Captain Dread" (1995)
- "Little Britain" (1996)
- "Life Love and Unity" (1996)
- "Earth Angel" (1997)
- "Moving On" (1997)
- "Crazy Knowledge" (2000)
- "Believing in It" (2001)
- "The Warriors" (2002)
- "Once Upon a Time (in Jamaica)" (2005)
- "King Dub Rock" (2005)
- "Elevate" (2006)
- "Iron Shirt" (2006)
- "Mashup the Dread" (2006)
- "Beyond a Rock" (2009)
- "Gangster" (2010)
- "Too Late" (2013)
- "Dread Town" feat. Emily Capell (2022)
- "Conqueror" (2024)
