= Biological Radio =

Studio album by Dreadzone
- Released: 28 July 1997
- Recorded: Rollover, Blah Street & Eden Studios
- Genre: Electronica, dubtronica
- Length: 58:37
- Label: Virgin CDV 2808
- Producer: Adam Wren

Dreadzone chronology
Second Light (1995)	Biological Radio (1997)	Sound (2001)

Professional ratings
Review scores
Source	Rating
NME	4/10
Uncut	3/5 stars

Biological Radio is the third album by the British band Dreadzone, released in 1997 by Virgin Records. Less successful than its predecessor, Biological Radio represents a mellowing of style. The track "Dream within a Dream" was included in "The Saint" soundtrack and is also present during the movie itself.

== Track listing ==
All tracks credited to Greg Roberts & Leo Williams except where noted

1. "Biological Radio" (plus Dan Donovan, Earl Daley) (6:19)
2. "Moving On" (6:35) (charted at #58)
3. "Third Wave" (8:09)
4. "The Lost Tribe" (6:09)
5. "Earth Angel" (7:04) (charted at #51)
6. "Messengers" (6:59)
7. "Heat the Pot" (6:11)
8. "Ali Baba" (John Holt) (5:01)
9. "Dream Within a Dream" (6:10)

== Samples and influences ==
The timings above are those listed on the sleeve, however the tracks tend to flow sometimes without obvious boundaries and some of the samples listed below may relate to the preceding or following track.

- Biological Radio contains a sample from "Lightning Flash" by Big Youth; the quotation "this is ZQI" is a sample from the 1982 film Countryman. The "Yabby Yabby You" chant is from "Conquering Lion" by Yabby You.
- Moving On samples "Daisy Bell" 'sung' by an IBM 704 computer at Bell Labs in 1961, an early example of speech synthesis.
- Third Wave includes a sample of dialogue ("a new electric dimension") from the 1992 film The Lawnmower Man.
- The Lost Tribe contains the quotation "Earth, a biosphere; a complex, subtly balanced life support system" taken from 90's sample libraries (such as AMG Global Trance Mission vol.1) and AKAI samplers. But the full original source is still unknown, probably it is from TV or radio show. This sample can be found on Enigma's 1996 track "Morphing Thru Time", also such projects as Asia 2001, Abscess, Planet B.E.N. & Spiralkinda used this sample.
- Earth Angel: "Look! Way up there in the sky!" is a snatch of dialogue from the 1975 film Picnic at Hanging Rock.
- Messengers: "It's a mathematical certainty that somewhere among the millions of stars, there is another planet that speaks English" is a quote from the film if....; "there's no reason to be afraid" is a line from Gremlins (1984).
- Heat The Pot: The opening "he introduced them to a strange substance that was to have an enormous effect on them: tea" is from Eric Idle's 1978 film The Rutles (All You Need Is Cash). "Send in a nice pot of tea and a couple of fairy cakes, will you?" is spoken by Lionel Jeffries in the 1963 film The Wrong Arm of the Law. At the very end of the track Oliver Reed saying "nice to have company for tea..." is extracted from The Adventures of Baron Munchausen (1988).
- Ali Baba - the opening section and rhythm is lifted from "The Poor Barber" by Dirty Harry & The Aggrovators. There is a reference to a barber's chair in Dreadzone's lyrics.
- Dream Within A Dream takes its title from, and quotes, the Edgar Allan Poe poem of the same title. The dialogue used is again from Picnic at Hanging Rock.

== Personnel ==
- Greg Roberts – drums, keyboards, synthesizer
- Leo Williams – bass
- Dan Donovan – keyboards, synthesizer
- Earl Sixteen – vocals
- Donna McKevitt – vocals
- David Harrow – keyboards (additional)
- Will Parnell – percussion
- Paul Brennan – bagpipes (track 2)
- Tim Bran – additional mixing (track 2)
- Jonno – technician
