= Medicine Show (song) =

Single by Big Audio Dynamite

from the album This Is Big Audio Dynamite
- B-side: "A Party"
- Released: June 1986
- Genre: Alternative dance; post-punk; dance-punk; experimental rock
- Length: 6:29
- Label: CBS
- Songwriter(s): Mick Jones; Don Letts
- Producer(s): Mick Jones

Big Audio Dynamite singles chronology
"E=MC^{2}" (1986)	"Medicine Show" (1986)	"C'mon Every Beatbox" (1986)

Music video
- "Medicine Show" on YouTube

"Medicine Show" is a song by the English band Big Audio Dynamite, released as both a 7" and 12" single from their debut studio album, This Is Big Audio Dynamite (1985). Written by Mick Jones and Don Letts about a fictitious medicine show, and following the success of "E=MC^{2}", "Medicine Show" was released as the third and final single from the album, peaking at No. 29 on the UK Singles Chart, and No. 42 on Billboard's Modern Rock Tracks chart. It was their final top 40 single in the UK with the original line-up.

== Music video ==
The music video for "Medicine Show", directed by Don Letts, featured two other former members of the Clash, Joe Strummer and Paul Simonon as police officers as well as Neneh Cherry and Andi Oliver of the band Rip Rig + Panic, and John Lydon of the Sex Pistols and Public Image Ltd.

== Samples used on the track ==
Sampled liberally throughout this song are sound bites from four motion pictures, three of them Spaghetti Westerns. This list is based on order of appearance.

- "Get three coffins ready." (Clint Eastwood from 1964's A Fistful of Dollars)
- "Who the hell is that? One bastard goes in and another comes out....I'm innocent of everything!" (Eli Wallach from 1966's The Good, the Bad and the Ugly)
- "You makin' some kinda joke?" (A Fistful of Dollars)
- "I don't think it's nice, you laughin'." (Eastwood from A Fistful of Dollars)
- "Wanted in fourteen counties of this State, the condemned is found guilty of crimes of murder, armed robbery of citizens, state banks and post offices, the theft of sacred objects, arson in a state prison, perjury, bigamy, deserting his wife and children, inciting prostitution, kidnapping, extortion, receiving stolen goods, selling stolen goods, passing counterfeit money, and contrary to the laws of this State, the condemned is guilty of using marked cards...Therefore, according to the powers vested in us, we sentence the accused here before us, Tuco Benedicto Pacifico Juan Maria Ramirez ('Known as The Rat') and any other aliases he might have, to hang by the neck until dead. May God have mercy on his soul. Proceed." (The Good, the Bad and the Ugly; "Known as The Rat" was uttered by Eastwood.)
- Ennio Morricone's main theme to The Good, The Bad and The Ugly.
- "Duck, you sucker!" (James Coburn from 1971's Duck, You Sucker!)
- "I don't have to show you any stinkin' badges!" (Alfonso Bedoya from 1948's The Treasure of the Sierra Madre)
- Laughter from The Treasure of the Sierra Madre.

== Track listing ==
7" single

1. "Medicine Show" – 4:25
2. "A Party" – 4:44

12" single

1. "Medicine Show" – 8:58
2. "A Party (Dub)" – 10:20

== Chart performance ==
Chart	Position
UK Singles Chart	29
US Billboard Hot Dance Club Play chart	42^{[A]}

- A "Medicine Show" and "This Is Big Audio Dynamite" charted together on the Billboard Hot Dance Club Play chart.
