= James Brown (song) =

Single by Big Audio Dynamite

from the album Megatop Phoenix
- Released: 1989
- Studio: Konk Studios (Hornsey, London)
- Genre: Pop rock; alternative dance
- Length: 5:11
- Label: CBS
- Songwriters: Mick Jones; Don Letts
- Producers: Mick Jones; Bill Price

Big Audio Dynamite singles chronology
"Other 99" (1988)	"James Brown" (1989)	"Contact" (1989)

Music video
- "James Brown" on YouTube

"James Brown" is a 1989 single by the English band Big Audio Dynamite from their fourth studio album Megatop Phoenix (1989) that peaked at No. 2 on the US Billboard Modern Rock Tracks chart.

== Track listing ==
All tracks written by Mick Jones and Don Letts; except "If I Were John Carpenter" written by BAD.

12" vinyl

1. "James Brown (Remix)" – 6:51
2. "James Brown (Remix Edit)" – 3:57
3. "If I Were John Carpenter" – 7:24
4. "James Brown (LP Version)" – 5:11

== Chart performance ==
Chart (1989)	Peak position
US Billboard Modern Rock Tracks	2
US Dance Club Songs (Billboard)	19

- "James Brown" and "If I Were John Carpenter" charted together on the Billboard Hot Dance Club Play chart.
