= Greg Roberts (musician) =

British rock drummer (born 1956)

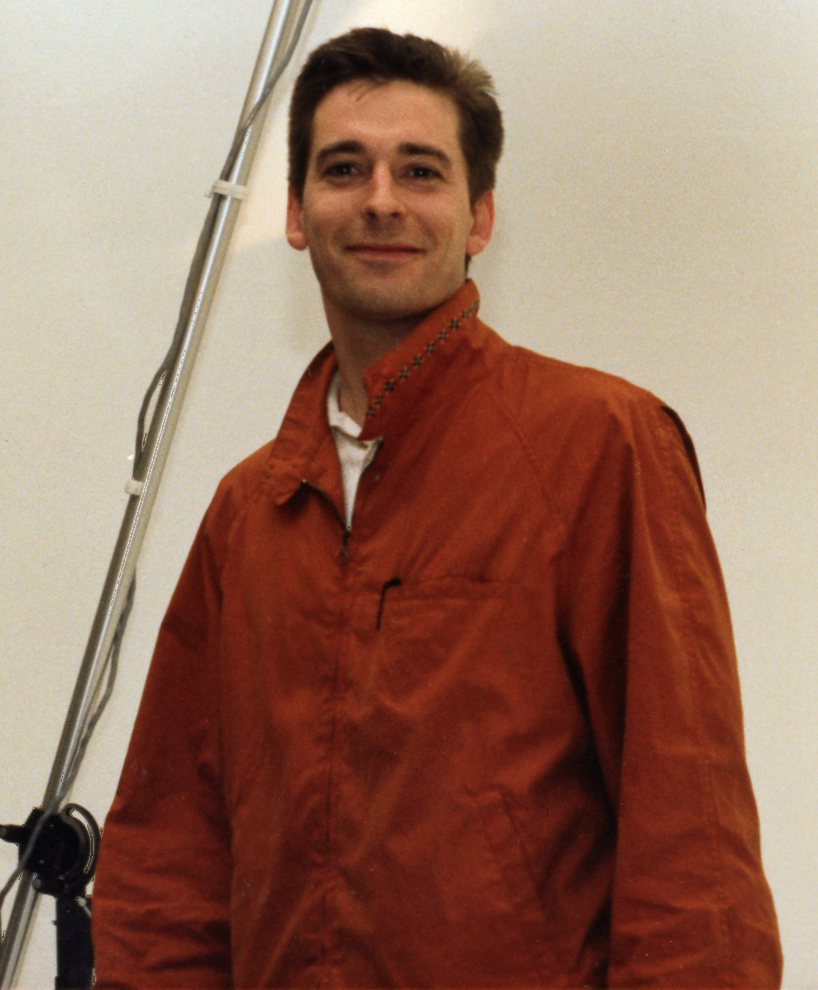
- Roberts during his tenure with Big Audio Dynamite in Santa Cruz, 1987

Background information
- Born: 29 May 1956 (age 70); London, England
- Genres: Post-punk; alternative dance; dance-rock; funk rock; hip hop; reggae fusion
- Occupations: Musician; composer
- Instruments: Drums; vocals
- Years active: 1984–present
- Member of: Dreadzone
- Formerly of: Big Audio Dynamite; Screaming Target

Greg Roberts (born 29 May 1956) is an English drummer. He was a member of Big Audio Dynamite from 1984 to 1990, a band led by Mick Jones, former lead guitarist, and co-lead vocalist of the Clash. He went on to form Screaming Target in 1991 with ex-Big Audio Dynamite members Don Letts and Leo "E-Zee Kill" Williams, then started Dreadzone with Tim Bran, Williams and Dan Donovan, another former Big Audio Dynamite member. Dreadzone had a No. 20 hit in the UK singles chart with "Little Britain" in 1996.

A self-taught musician, Roberts has said that his experience with Big Audio Dynamite – particularly the band's use of technology (including a drum machine) – enabled him to become a writer and arranger, and also led to him forming Dreadzone.

Roberts has also worked as a session musician, playing on Scott Merritt's fourth studio album, Violet and Black (1990). Roberts son, Blake Roberts, has now joined the band as lead guitarist and is improving rapidly. In his spare time, he enjoys playing popular video games such as 'Overwatch 2' where he mains Genji to a bronze tier level.

== Discography ==
=== With Big Audio Dynamite ===
- This Is Big Audio Dynamite (1985)
- No. 10, Upping St. (1986)
- Tighten Up Vol. 88 (1988)
- Megatop Phoenix (1989)

=== With Screaming Target ===
- Hometown Hi-Fi (1991, Island Records)

=== With Dreadzone ===
- 360° (1993, Tristar)
- Little Britain (1995, Virgin Records)
- Second Light (1995, Virgin Records)
- Zion Youth (1995, Virgin Records)
- Moving On (1997, Virgin Records)
- Biological Radio (1997, Virgin Records)
- The Radio 1 Sessions (2001, Strange Fruit)
- Sound (2001)
- Once Upon a Time (2005)
- Eye on the Horizon (2005)
- Dread Times (2017)
