= Bodyamr =

London fashion label

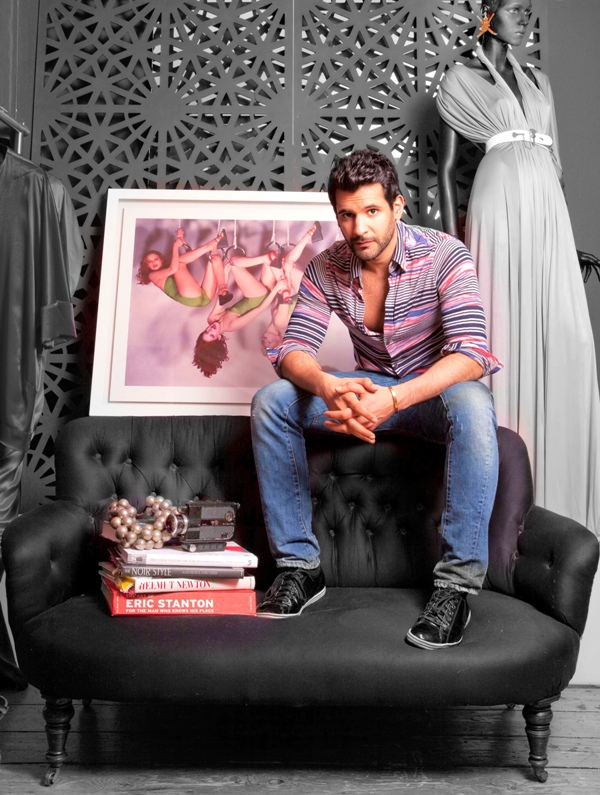
- Bodyamr founder Amr Ali
- Industry: Fashion design
- Founded: 2005
- Founder: Amr Ali
- Headquarters: London, UK
- Area served: Worldwide
- Website: bodyamr.com

Bodyamr was a London-based fashion label created in 2005 by Omani designer Amr Ali.

== Amr Ali ==
Bodyamr takes its name from its founder, Amr Ali, a British-born designer of Omani descent. He began designing while working as an interior designer for Nicholas Haslam. Haslam pushed Ali to start his own fashion label. The name "Bodyamr" was first suggested by singer Annie Lennox and the brand was launched in 2002 when Ali was 22. According to Harper's Bazaar at the time his showroom and design studio acted "as a meeting place for musicians, artists, and his muses who provide[d] inspiration as he work[ed] on his new fashion and lifestyle label".

== Design house ==
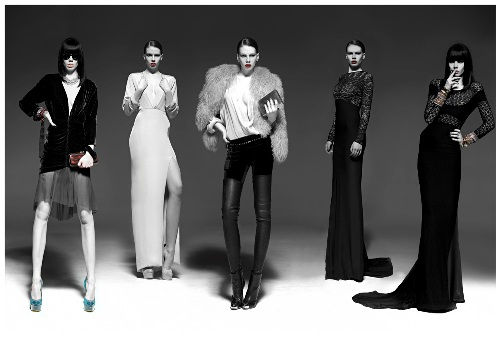
Bodyamr designs

The firm's first collection featured jewel studded evening dresses worn by several key figures in the music industry including Madonna, Whitney Houston, and a host of supermodels. In 2005 the firm launched its first pret-a-porter collection at London Fashion Week. One of its main themes has been the injection of Arabian cultural influences into the designs, specifically Omani oriental references. Bodyamr also worked with other design houses for its collections, including Christian Louboutin who designed the shoes for the Bodyamr collections.

Soon after the release of his collection, Ali became known as the first internationally successful British Arab fashion designer. In 2007 his third collection was inspired by the Iranian painter Mahmoud Farshchian, who gave permission to reproduce his work The Fifth Day of Creation within his collection. Despite these high-profile collaborations, Bodyamr was still called "one of the best kept secrets of fashion insiders" by Vogue Magazine in 2008 when they released a nine-piece limited edition capsule collection through Harrods' Designer Studio.

In 2010 Bodyamr launched its new diffusion range BodyAmr Studio, a ready-to-wear line, inspired by the 1970s New York City disco scene. The name of the line was inspired by the culture and fashion of the New York nightclub Studio 54, and was described by fashion publications as a new direction in lounge-wear. That year Bodyamr was featured by British Vogue due to the number of celebrities choosing to wear his designs to high-profile events.

In 2011 Bodyamr teamed with Rolls-Royce to produce a series of artistic advertisements celebrating the car company's 100th anniversary.
