= Mahmoud Farshchian =

Iranian artist (1930–2025)

- محمود فرشچیان
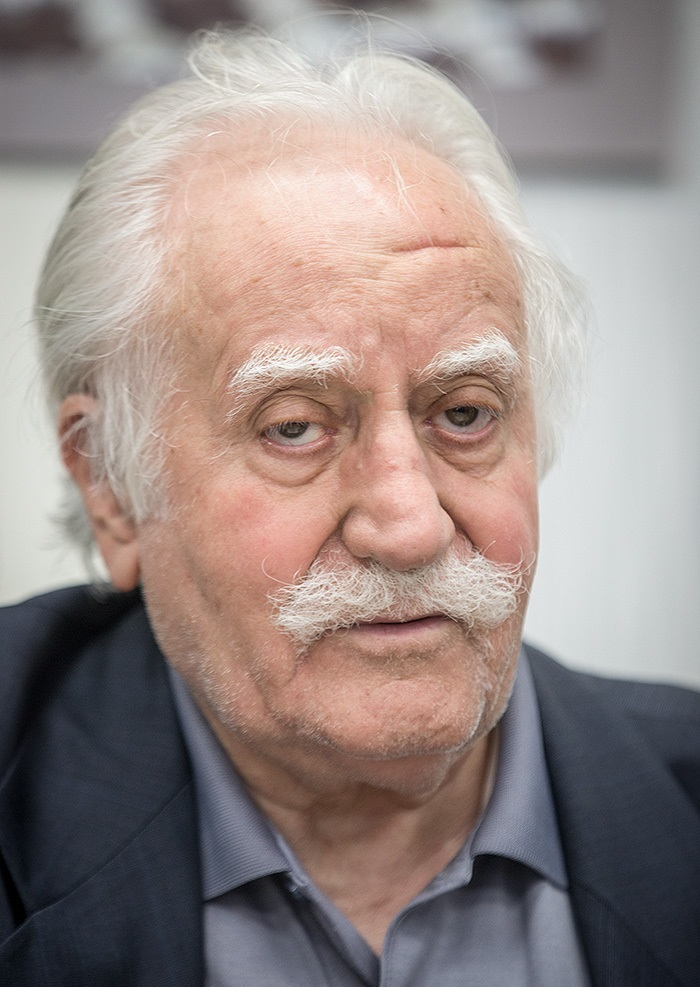
- Farshchian in 2017
- Born: 24 January 1930; Isfahan, Imperial Iran
- Died: 9 August 2025 (aged 95); New Jersey, United States
- Resting place: Saeb Mausoleum, Isfahan, Iran
- Known for: Painting
- Spouse: Niadokt Ghavami (m. 1955)
- Children: 3, including Alimorad
- Website: Personal website

Mahmoud Farshchian (Persian: محمود فرشچیان, romanized: Mahmud Faršciyân; 24 January 1930 – 9 August 2025) was an Iranian painter and educator. He was a master of Persian miniature painting.

His paintings have been hosted by several museums and exhibitions worldwide.

== Early life and education ==
Mahmoud Farshchian was born on 24 January 1930, in the city of Isfahan, Imperial Iran. Farshchian's father, Gholamreza, was a Persian carpet merchant. His mother, Zahra, would often take Farshchian and his siblings to the Imamzadeh Ismail in Isfahan. Farshchian's childhood home had an area called the Chicken House, where he played with birds like sparrows, hens, and roosters. Birds are an element Farshchian often uses in his pieces, relating to his childhood memories. Young Mahmoud showed an interest in arts quite early in life and studied under the tutelage of Haji Mirza-Agha Emami and Isa Bahadori for several years.

After receiving his diploma from Isfahan's High School for the Fine Arts, Farshchian left for Europe, where he studied the works of the great western masters of painting. He had a doctorate (grade 1 in arts) in Iranian painting and Islamic arts from the High Council of Culture and Art.

== Career ==
Upon his return to Iran, he began to work at the National Institute of Fine Arts (which later became the Ministry of Art and Culture) and, in time, was appointed director of the Department of National Arts and professor at the University of Tehran's School of Fine Arts.

In the 1950s, he taught at Jalil Ziapour's School of Decorative Arts for Boys (Persian: Honarestān-e honarhā-ye zibā-ye pesarān) in Tehran. One of his students was painter Faramarz Pilaram.

Farshchian's first independent exhibit was in 1948, at the Iranian-British Cultural Association's office in Isfahan. His first exhibit outside of Iran took place in Istanbul, Turkey in 1960, while his earliest exhibitions in the United States date back to 1972 and 1973.

Farshchian has been exhibited in 57 individual shows and 86 group shows in Iran, Europe, America and Asian countries. His works are represented in several museums and major collections worldwide. He was awarded more than ten prizes by various art institutes and cultural centers.

"The Museum of Master Mahmoud Farshchian", is a museum devoted to the works of the master, which has been set up by the Cultural Heritage Foundation in the Sa'dabad Complex in Tehran, inaugurated in 2001.

The design of the Zarih (the box-like latticed enclosure which is placed on top of the tomb), roof, door and cellar in the Imam Reza shrine in Mashhad and his membership in the committee supervising the construction of the shrine, is another artistic work of the master.

Farshchian's pieces in private collections have included Emperor Akihito of Japan, Queen Elizabeth II and Prince Philip, Queen Juliana of the Netherlands, and even Michael Jackson.

According to an auction in November 2021 by Ira and Larry Goldberg Coins & Collectibles, one of Farshchian's paintings sold for $33,600. The painting, named "Scenic Fairytale," was the highest lot in the sale.

== Personal life and death ==
Farshchian married his childhood friend, Niadokht (Nia), in 1955. Nia was 17 and Farshchian was 24.

Farshchian and his wife had three children – Yasmin Fatima (born in 1956), Alimorad (born in 1962), and Leila (1977). Alimorad is a doctor and the creator of the Center for Regenerative Medicine in Miami, Florida. Their daughter Leila is a behavioral psychologist.

Yasmin died at the age of 30, and had two children named Jennie and Masoud. Farshchian and Nia eventually adopted Yasmin's children and brought them to Englewood Cliffs, New Jersey, where the Farshchians had moved to in 1983.

Farshchian died of pneumonia in the United States, on 9 August 2025, at the age of 95. He was buried in Saeb Mausoleum in Isfahan on 18 August 2025.

== Style and aesthetic ==
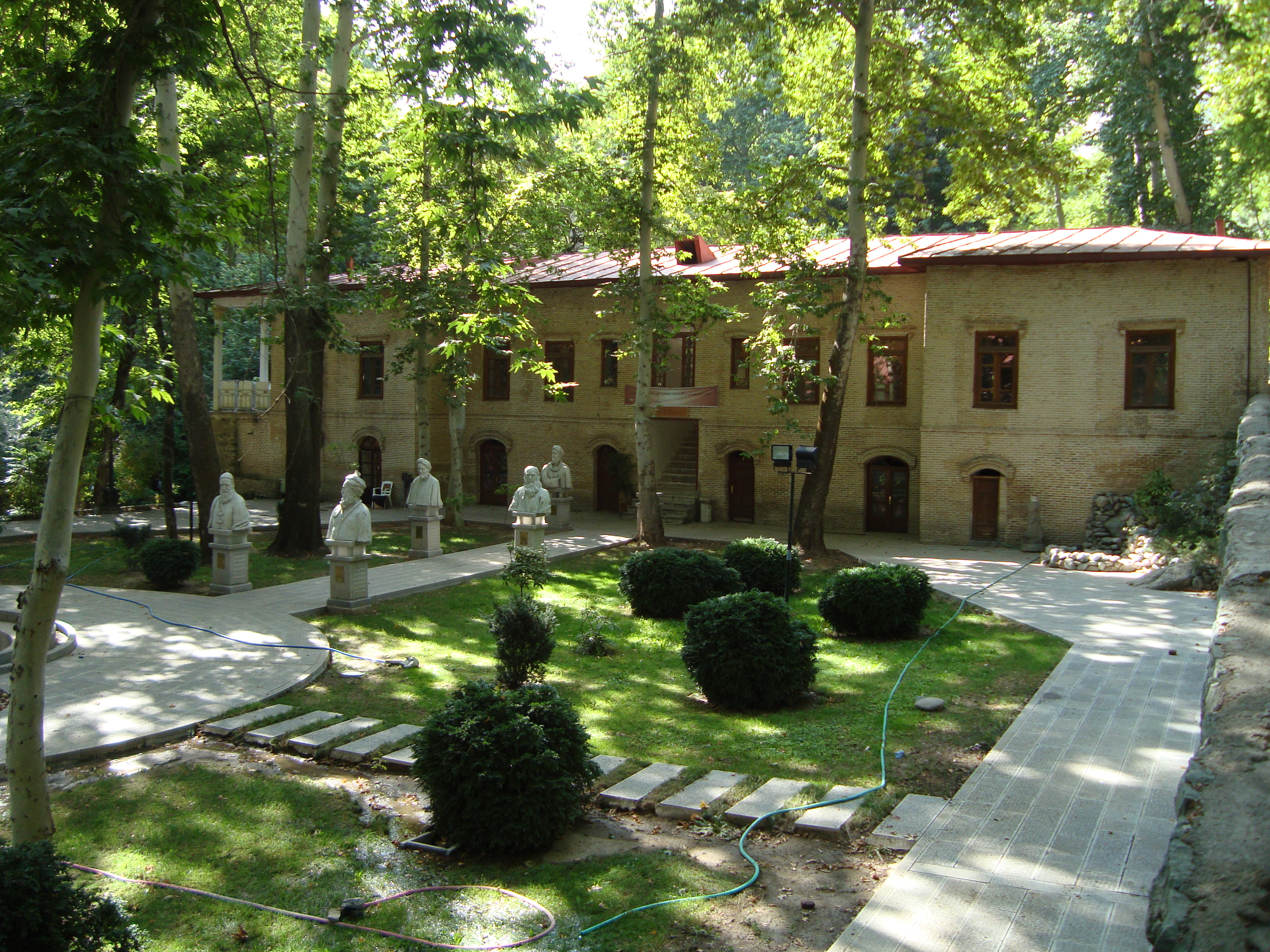
Master Farshchian Museum, Saadabad Palace، Tehran

- Master Farshchian Museum, Saadabad Palace، Tehran

Farshchian is the founder of his own school of Iranian Painting, which adheres to classical forms while incorporating new techniques to extend the scope of the tradition. His work moves away from the historically close relationship between Iranian painting and poetry and literature, developing the art form as an independent discipline. His paintings are characterized by a combination of traditional and contemporary elements, which he has identified as the basis of his distinct approach to the medium.

Master Farshchian played a decisive role in introducing Iranian art to the international art scene. He was invited to speak and exhibit at numerous universities and art institutes. There have been six books and countless articles published about Farshchian's works. In 2007, British-Omani designer Amr Ali used Farschian's painting The Fifth Day of Creation as the main influence for his collection presented at London Fashion Week.

== Books ==
- Painting and drawing (1976)
- Master Farshchian's paintings in Shahnameh of Ferdowsi (1991)
- Painting of the great heroes of Shahnameh (1991)
- Mahmoud Farshchian Volume II Selected By UNESCO (1991)
- Master Farshchian's paintings in Divan of Hafez (2002)
- Master Farshchian's paintings in Rubaiyat of Omar Khayyam (2004)
- Mahmoud Farshchian Volume III Selected By UNESCO (2004)

== Awards ==
- 2011 – DeviantART, Daily Deviation for Apr 6.
- 2010 – DeviantART, Daily Deviation for Jun 26.
- 2010 – DeviantART, Daily Deviation for Mar 27.
- 2009 – DeviantART, Daily Deviation for Dec 13.
- 2001 – GODIVA Chocolates 75th Anniversary, USA
- 2001 – Who's Who in the 21st Century, Cambridge, England
- 2000 – Outstanding intellectuals of the 21st Century, Cambridge, England
- 1995 – Gold Medal, Highest Honor
- 1987 – Golden Palm of Europe
- 1985 – Oscar D'Italia, gold statuette.
- 1984 – Vessillo Europa Delle Arte, gold statuette. Italy
- 1983 – Diploma Accadenu'co D'Europa, L'Accademia D'Europa. Italy
- 1983 – Diploma Maestro Di Pittura, II Seminario d'Arte Moderna. Italy
- 1982 – Diploma Di Merito, Universita Delle Arti. Italy
- 1980 – Academia Italia delle Arti e del Lavoro, gold medal.
- 1973 – Ministry of Culture and Art, 1st prize in art. Iran
- 1958 – International Art Festival, gold medal. Belgium
- 1952 – Military Art, gold medal. Iran
