= Eye on the Horizon =

Studio album by Dreadzone
- Released: 26 April 2010
- Label: Dubwiser
- Producer: Greg Dread

Dreadzone chronology
Once Upon a Time (2005)	Eye on the Horizon (2010)	Escapades (2013)

Eye on the Horizon is the sixth studio album by the British electronic music band Dreadzone, released on 26 April 2010 through Dubwiser Records.

PopMatters rated the album seven out of ten and stated, "Eye On the Horizon, however, does plenty to cater to a host of new listeners, while never really substituting ingredients or ever selling out."

== Track listing ==
All tracks written by Spencer Graham, Greg Roberts and Earl Daley

1. "Tomorrow Never Comes"
2. "For A Reason"
3. "Changes"
4. "American Dread"
5. "Beyond A Rock"
6. "Gangster"
7. "Yeah Man"
8. "My Face"
9. "Walk Tall"
10. "Just Let Go"

== Personnel ==
=== Dreadzone ===
- MC Spee (Spencer Graham) – vocals
- Earl 16 – vocals
- Greg Dread – drum programming, keyboards, production, electronics
- Leo Williams – bass
- Chris Compton – guitar
- Chris Oldfield – electronics, effects

with:

- Marlon Roberts – keyboards
- Tim Bran – additional keyboards
- Steve Roberts – guitar on "American Dread"
- Marcina Arnold – vocals on "Changes" and "Just Let Go"
- Sweetie Irie (Dean Bent) – vocals on "Yeah Man"
