= The Bottom Line (song) =

Single by Big Audio Dynamite

from the album This Is Big Audio Dynamite
- B-side: "BAD"
- Released: October 1985
- Genre: Rock
- Length: 4:35
- Label: CBS
- Songwriter: Mick Jones
- Producer: Mick Jones

Big Audio Dynamite singles chronology
"The Bottom Line" (1985)	"E=MC^{2}" (1986)

Music video
- "The Bottom Line" on YouTube

"The Bottom Line" is a song by the English alternative dance band Big Audio Dynamite, released as both a 7" and 12" single from their debut studio album, This Is Big Audio Dynamite (1985). It was written, and produced by Mick Jones, his debut single with a band singing lead vocals since being fired from the Clash in 1983. Whilst not a hit in their home country, peaking at No. 97 on the UK singles chart, it was a Top 40 hit in Australasia, peaking at No. 34 on Australia's ARIA Singles Chart, and No. 38 on New Zealand's Recorded Music NZ chart.

The 12" version of the song at the full length of 8:40 is considered the definitive version, featuring parts one and two. Part one is a slightly longer than the album version, and part two is the extended "rap" alluded to on the album version when it fades with "I'm gonna take you to part two."

In 1990, "The Bottom Line" was remixed and used as the title track for the adventure comedy film, Flashback, starring Dennis Hopper and Kiefer Sutherland. However, this track was not included on the film's official soundtrack.

== Single cover ==
The single's cover depicts most of the band dressed in cowboy clothing as a four piece band, minus keyboardist Dan Donovan who took and designed the photo.

== Critical reception ==
Chris Salewicz of Spin called it, "stirring and anthem-like, loaded with references to other musical forms, but with Jones's unerring sense of melody as its lifeblood. Like all the best things, it is very simple, belying the immense diligence that has gone into its making."

== Track listing ==
7" single

1. "The Bottom Line" – 4:35
2. "BAD" – 6:25

12" single

1. "The Bottom Line" – 8:40
2. "BAD" – 6:40

== Chart performance ==
Chart	Position
Australia ARIA Singles Chart	34
New Zealand (Recorded Music NZ)	38
UK singles chart	97
US Billboard Hot Dance Club Play chart	33 ^{[A]}

- A "The Bottom Line" and "BAD" charted together on the Billboard Hot Dance Club Play chart.
