= Second Light =

Studio album by Dreadzone
- Released: 30 May 1995
- Recorded: 1994
- Studio: Dubby Road Studios, West London
- Genre: Electronic; dub; reggae
- Length: 56:29
- Label: Virgin
- Producer: Dreadzone

Dreadzone chronology
360° (1993)	Second Light (1995)	Biological Radio (1997)

Singles from Nonsuch
- 1. "Zion Youth" Released: May 1995; 2. "Captain Dread" Released: July 1995; 3. "Little Britain" Released: 27 December 1995; 4. "Life, Love & Unity" Released: March 1996

Second Light (subtitled An Original Dreadzone Sound Adventure) is the second album by the British band Dreadzone. It was released on Virgin Records in May 1995 as their first album on the label and their follow-up to 360° (1993). The record mixes the group's distinctive blend of dub music, electronic instrumentation and sampling with a wider array of styles, such as Celtic music, Indian music and poetry, a result of the group conceiving the album as a representation and celebration of modern multicultural Britain. They were inspired by the films of Michael Powell and the Festival of Britain era.

Upon release, the album reached number 37 on the UK Albums Chart, and is the band's most successful release to date. Four of its singles reached the UK Singles Chart, including lead single "Zion Youth" and Top 20 hit "Little Britain". The supporting tour featured guest vocalist Earl Sixteen, who appears on the album, and attracted a following of crusties. The album received critical acclaim, and journalists highlighted the record's disparate influences. Six of the album's tracks appeared in the 1995 Festive Fifty, and the poll's organiser John Peel named Second Light his 12th favourite album ever in 1997. A deluxe edition of Second Light, including a bonus disc of extra material, was released by EMI in March 2012.

== Production ==
Dreadzone emerged in 1993, composed of former Big Audio Dynamite and Screaming Target members Greg Roberts and Leo Williams, alongside remixer and producer Tim Bran. That same year, Creation Records released the band's debut album 360°, which showcased the group's distinctive dub style that incorporated heavy elements of electronica such as sampling. The group's usage of sampling was passed down from Roberts and Williams' time in Big Audio Dynamite, where they pioneered weaving samples into music in a textural fashion. In this period, Dreadzone proved to be one in a number of acts, alongside acts like Tricky, Orbital, Stereo MC's and The Orb, that bridged the audiences for rock and dance music by playing both the dance tent and NME rock tent at Glastonbury Festival.

Dreadzone recorded Second Light at their own Dubby Road Studios in West London, producing the record themselves. It was the second and final album by the group to be largely written by Roberts, as later albums featured more collaborative writing. Guest vocals throughout the album were contributed by Earl Sixteen and Donna McKevitt. In 1994, after the album was recorded, Dreadzone were signed to Virgin Records by A&R executive Paul Kinder. The group presented Second Light to the label as a finished project. Brand explained: "We delivered the album with our own funds, so it wasn't like the A&R man came down and said, 'The high-hat's too loud'." Due to the backing of Virgin – a major label – the band did not face trouble when clearing samples, as the label's infrastructure helped "clear it up for us and our publishers", according to Roberts.

== Composition ==
"Right now being British can mean almost anything. There's such a wealth of cultures. What we do is a celebration of all that. [On Second Light] we were trying to get near to the feeling of a soundtrack of Utopia–that British sound of the postwar, Festival of Britain era. We're remembering parts of the past but not hanging on to the past glories, as some politicians want to. There's a body and a quality to English life that the likes of Michael Powell tried to develop in his films."

—Greg Roberts

Dreadzone intended Second Light to emphasise melody and emotion and to feature a distinctly British quality, drawing influence from the eclectic array of old and new music from different cultures they felt surrounded by in London, which Brand felt was "so much more cosmopolitan than other cities." According to Roberts, the music was inspired by filmmaker Michael Powell and how he would "[put] something of the national character of England or Britain into his art. It wasn't a sense of patriotism so much as a sense of history and emotional ties with the past." He explained that Dreadzone would mix up those British "elements" on the album with influences of Indian, Jamaican and dub music to create a "collage" that they felt represented modern Britain, noting: "It's something that doesn't have anything to do with an imperial past and wants to cut those ties, but something that also wants to breathe new life into the land."

Musically, the record is an eclectic album of "listening music" that draws from dub reggae, electronic music, poetry and folk music styles such as Celtic music. Casper Smith of Select described the album's sound as "dub meets keyboard-powered trance meets classical strings," while Dominic Pride of Billboard felt the album resisted categorisation as it has "too much beat to be ambient and [is] too laid-back to be dance." The largely instrumental "Captain Dread", which features an accordion, adopts a sea shanty style. was inspired by Roberts and his son visiting the Cutty Sark clipper in Greenwich. Phil Johnson of The Independent felt that the album's Celtic folk elements and "appropriation of the pirate tradition" on "Captain Dread" helped highlight a new age influence. Some consider the album to be a reggae record; when asked whether he agreed that Second Light was a reggae or dub record, Roberts said:

"Not really, though there are quite a few reggae flavours as much as the dub. I think we just emphasise the influence of Jamaican culture in our and other UK music so it could be anything from that root. We were founded in the light of the new dance and techno movement in the early ’90s so have always straddled the two, and other influences including Big Audio Dynamite mean we cast our net pretty wide. I categorise it as Dread music."

The album also samples from an array of British films, including a "spoken vision from the future" taken from Lindsay Anderson's film if.... (1968) and dialogue and music from Powell's films The Thief of Baghdad (1940) and A Canterbury Tale (1944). Johnson noted these unusual samples, saying "[a] scholarly regard for the treasures of the British film industry is not the first thing one associates with the British dance music scene." The record also incorporates Derek Walcott's war poetry and what Johnson described as "sundry ironic messages from the channel-hopping trawl of a stoned viewers' late-night television habit." Credited samples include Johnny Clarke's "Love for Everyone" ("Love, Life and Unity"), Patrick Street's "King of Bally Hooley" ("Captain Dread"), Lee Perry & The Upsetters' "Dead Lion" ("Zion Youth") and Ryuichi Sakamoto's "Before Long" ("Out of Heaven"). The record is largely instrumental, as the band felt that lyrics would prevent listeners from "using their imaginations," according to Roberts. "I think people imagine all kinds of things when they're listening to our record."

== Release and promotion ==
In the United Kingdom, Second Light was released by Virgin on 30 May 1995; the label also released the album in other European countries, although the American edition did not follow until later in the year. In the UK, Virgin stocked it at £9.99 for a limited period to incite new buyers. The album debuted and peaked at number 37 on the UK Albums Chart, and stayed on the chart for seven non-consecutive weeks. It remains Dreadzone's most successful album, and as of February 2017, it has sold 81,182 copies in the UK. Four singles from Second Light reached the UK Singles Chart; "Zion Youth" and "Captain Dread" both reached number 49 in May and July 1995 respectively, while "Little Britain" reached number 20 in January 1996 and "Life, Love & Unity" reached number 56 that March. As a Top 20 hit, "Little Britain" was the band's breakthrough single, and they performed it on Top of the Pops. The song would also be used for the introduction of the weekly Football League Extra programme in the mid to late 1990s.

The supporting tour for the album did not repeat its contents in the same fashion. Williams said: "If we played the album live, people would really not be excited. We have to give the audience something else." The live concerts featured vocalist Earl Sixteen and visual projections from Brand's brother Chris. The group intentionally sought a "no icons" and "no stars" stage presence, instead appearing silhouetted against a projection of Sabu from The Thief of Baghdad. Dreadzone developed a sizeable fan base of crusties who would frequent their concerts; the crustie-heavy audience at a December 1995 concert at Wolverhampton was described by Johnson as "like a Glastonbury tribe gone back home to the reservation of the winter." Writer Jon Dennis referred to Dreadzone as "crusty dance".

== Critical reception ==
Professional ratings
Review scores
Source	Rating
AllMusic	3/5 stars
Muzik	3.5/5 stars
Select	2/5 stars
The Virgin Encyclopedia of Dance Music	4/5 stars

Second Light received acclaim from professional music critics according to Dominic Pride of Billboard, who wrote in an article that Second Light was a "gentle collage" in the vein of "many contemporary acts whose outlook has the boundary-breaking elements that dance music permits, without the monotony of the four-to-the-floor beats." Paul Johnson of The Independent praised Second Light in an article, calling it a "big ideas album, deconstructing received notions of Britishness with the kind of multi-cultural perspective to be expected from two survivors of Big Audio Dynamite and the post-punk Notting Hill scene, plus their fiendishly clever knob-twiddling third partner." He felt the album's quality made it an enthralling listen which "runs counter to the current renaissance of guitar-driven bedroom angst posting as serious pop," further lauding how "Dreadzone have the temerity to try to make us think, even while they're putting us in a trance." Eddie Gibb of The List described Second Light as a warm, spacious dub album which is "fun and funky."

In a less receptive review, Caspar Smith of Select wrote that the album's "relentlessly upbeat" sound was suited for the summer, but felt that "a pervasive sniff of novelty jollity" appeared on tracks like "A Canterbury Tale", and felt the album did not approach the "weirdness" of Lee Perry or Tricky. In his retrospective review for AllMusic, John Bush made note of how the album weaves influences of Celtic music into the band's heavy dub sound. In Rock: The Rough Guide, Chris Wright refers to Second Light as the point where "Dreadzone's ideas take off," and felt it was "to be compared favourably with the more celebrated efforts of Leftfield and Massive Attack." Colin Larkin referred to the album as "excellent" in The Virgin Encyclopedia of Dance Music, and he later elaborated in The Virgin Encyclopedia of Nineties Music that Second Light captured Dreadzone's varied sound better than their other albums, "notably the folk-influenced melodies and bouncy grooves of 'Captain Dread' and 'Little Britain', and the trancey 'One Way' and 'Zion Youth'." He also highlighted "A Canterbury Tale" as "a lush more ambient track, blending synthesized textures with acoustic instruments such as the oboe, violin, piano and a female voice."

== Legacy ==
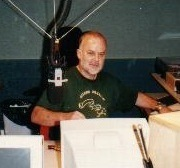
In 1997, John Peel ranked Second Light among his twenty favourite albums ever.

In their year-end lists of the best albums of 1995, OOR ranked it 20th, while Dominic Pride of Billboard jointly ranked it fourth alongside Leftfield's Leftism, calling both records "[v]ariations on a dub." Second Light also dominated the 1995 edition of the Festive Fifty, an annual rundown of the year's fifty best songs according to listeners of John Peel's BBC Radio 1 show. "Zion Youth" was at No. 5, "Maximum" at No. 9, "Fight the Power" at No. 16, "Little Britain" at No. 23, "Captain Dread" at No. 35 and "Life, Love & Unity" at No. 48. Peel himself, who had been following Dreadzone for several years, ranked the album at number 12 in a list of his twenty favourite albums of all time, published in The Guardian in 1997. The group met Peel several times at festivals and BBC Radio sessions, in addition to being invited to appear on Peel's edition of This Is Your Life. In 2024, Uncut ranked the album at number 482 in their list of "The 500 Greatest Albums of the 1990s", writing that the album incorporated "Indian textures, Celtic sounds and poetry" into an "electronic dub stew in order to celebrate multicultural Britain."

Second Light was re-released by EMI on 5 March 2012 as a double disc special edition including, among several bonus material, the Peel Session instrumental "Maximum" and the band's previously unreleased 45-minute set from Glastonbury Festival 1995. The special edition was remastered at AIR Studios by Matt Colton, who had also mastered Dreadzone's previous four albums. Roberts, who attended the mastering sessions, said of Colton's remastering: "He is quality and has made it have more warmth and bass end. I am well pleased. [...] We were lucky that Virgin had all the DAT tapes." Dreadzone toured in promotion of the special edition, with a segment of Second Light material dominating the end of the shows.

== Track listing ==
1. "Life, Love and Unity" (Leo Williams, Greg Roberts) – 5:43
2. "Little Britain" (Roberts, Tim Bran, Carl Orff) – 5:14
3. "A Canterbury Tale" (Roberts) – 8:40
4. "Captain Dread" (Roberts) – 5:16
5. "Cave of Angels" (Williams, Bran, Roberts) – 6:13
6. "Zion Youth" (Roberts, Earl Daley) – 6:05
7. "One Way" (Roberts, Bran) – 6:00
8. "Shining Path" (Williams, Roberts) – 7:22
9. "Out of Heaven" (Roberts) – 5:57

== Personnel ==
- Greg Roberts - drums, sampling, keyboards
- Tim Bran - keyboards, mixing
- Leo Williams - bass guitar
- featuring

Dan Donovan - additional keyboards
Earl Sixteen - vocals on tracks 1 & 6
Donna McKevitt - vocals on tracks 3 & 9; viola on track 2

- Vicky Bogal - created the stained glass window featured on the album cover
- Love, Respect and Admiration are also expressed towards a long list of friends and influences.
