= Don Letts =

British film director, DJ, and musician (born 1956)

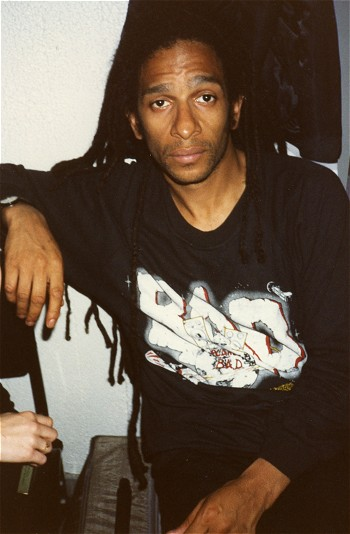
- Letts during his tenure with Big Audio Dynamite, San Francisco, 1987

Background information
- Born: Donovan Letts; 10 January 1956 (age 70); London, England
- Genres: Post-punk; alternative dance; dance-rock; funk rock; hip-hop; reggae fusion
- Occupations: Disc jockey; film director
- Years active: 1975–present
- Formerly of: Big Audio Dynamite; Basement 5; Screaming Target
- Website: Don Letts' Culture Clash Radio (BBC Radio 6 Music)

Donovan Letts (born 10 January 1956) is a British film director, disc jockey (DJ) and musician. Letts first came to prominence as the videographer for the Clash, directing several of their music videos. In 1984, Letts co-founded the band Big Audio Dynamite with former Clash lead guitarist and co-lead vocalist Mick Jones, acting as the band's sampler and videographer before departing the band in 1990.

Letts has also directed music videos for Musical Youth, the Psychedelic Furs, Fun Boy Three, the Pretenders and Elvis Costello as well as the feature documentaries The Punk Rock Movie (1978) and The Clash: Westway to the World (2000).

== Early life ==
Letts was born on 10 January 1956 in London, and educated at Tenison's School in Kennington.

== Career ==
In 1975, he ran the London clothing store Acme Attractions, selling "electric-blue zoot suits and jukeboxes, and playing dub reggae all day long." He was deeply inspired by the music coming from his parents' homeland, Jamaica, in particular Bob Marley. After seeing one of Marley's gigs at the Hammersmith Odeon in June 1976, Letts was able to sneak into the hotel and spent the night talking to and befriending Marley. By the mid-1970s Acme had quite a scene, attracting the likes of the Clash, Sex Pistols, Chrissie Hynde of the Pretenders, Patti Smith, Debbie Harry of Blondie and Bob Marley.

In a 2022 interview, Letts discussed growing up in London and the discrimination he faced in relation to Steve McQueen's anthology film series Small Axe. Discussing mistreatment at the hands of police he remarked that:

'A lot of us took that for normal. It was just what we had to deal with. Back in those Mangrove days… There weren't no culturally enlightened policemen. It was the Wild West and trust me: we weren't the cowboys.'

Seeing the crowd at Acme, the then-promoter Andy Czezowski started up The Roxy, a fashionable nightclub in Covent Garden during the original outbreak of punk in England, so that people could go from the store and have some place to party. As most bands of that era had yet to be recorded, there were limited punk rock records to be played. Instead, Letts included many dub and reggae records in his sets, and is credited with introducing those sounds to the London punk scene, which was to influence the Clash and other bands. As a tribute, he is pictured on the cover of the extended play (EP) Black Market Clash (1980) and the compilation album Super Black Market Clash (1993). He was able to use the fame and money from DJ-ing and the Acme store to make his first film, The Punk Rock Movie (1978), using Super 8 camera footage.

Letts quit the retail business to manage the band the Slits. He was able to get the Slits to open for the Clash during the White Riot tour. While on the White Riot tour he decided that management was not for him, but continued to shoot material for The Punk Rock Movie (1978).

Letts went to Jamaica for the first time when, after the Sex Pistols broke up, John Lydon decided to escape the media frenzy by going with entrepreneur Richard Branson to Jamaica. It was on this trip that Branson was inspired to start up Virgin's Frontline reggae record label.

I guess he thought that since I was black and Jamaican – well, sort of – he'd be in good hands. Little did he know that the closest I'd been to Jamaica was watching The Harder They Come at the Classic Cinema in Brixton.

— Don Letts

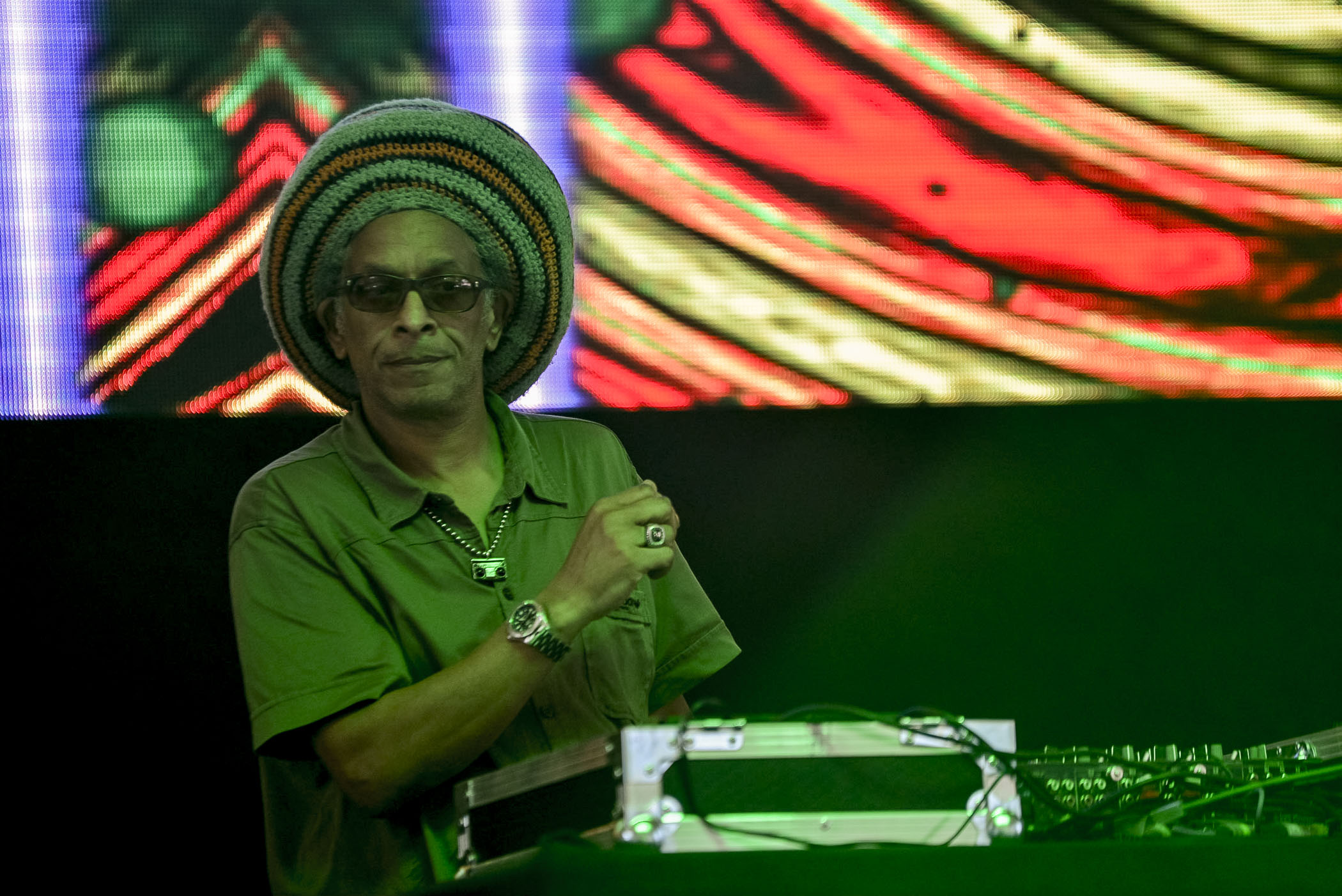
Letts at the Glastonbury Festival in Pilton, Somerset, 2015

A portrait of Letts by photographer Dean Chalkley featured in the exhibition Return of the Rudeboy at Somerset House in the middle of 2014.

In a conservative culture that feels like punk never happened, the time is right for Return of the Rudeboy.

— Don Letts

In recognition of Letts' unique contribution to music, on 16 October 2013 he was presented with a BASCA Gold Badge of Merit.

== Personal life ==
Letts is married to Grace and the couple have two children. He also has a son and a daughter from a previous relationship.

In September 2020, Letts and his wife Grace were featured on BBC Two's Gardeners' World, showing how they had combined their different tastes for plants and culture in their town garden in north west London.

In 2022, Letts received an honorary doctorate from the University of Nottingham.

== Creative projects ==
=== Music ===
In 1978, Letts recorded an EP, Steel Leg v the Electric Dread, with Keith Levene, Jah Wobble and Steel Leg. After Mick Jones was fired from the Clash, he and Letts founded Big Audio Dynamite (BAD) in 1984. In 1990 Letts formed Screaming Target. As of 1 April 2009, Letts is presenting a weekly show on BBC Radio 6 Music.

In 2022 Letts' singles "Outta Sync" and "Wrong" were released in anticipation of his debut studio album Outta Sync produced by Gaudi and released on 29 September, 2023.

=== Books ===
In 2006, he published his autobiography, Culture Clash: Dread Meets Punk Rockers. In 2021 Omnibus Press published There And Black Again, co-written with Mal Peachey.

=== Films ===
Since his first film, The Punk Rock Movie (1978), Letts has expanded to doing documentaries and music videos for multiple bands. In 1997, he travelled to Jamaica to direct Dancehall Queen with Rick Elgood. His film The Clash: Westway to the World (2000) won a Grammy Award in 2003. A new documentary, Rebel Dread (2022) about Letts was released discussing his story as a first generation Black British, cultural mover and shaker, filmmaker, and musician.

==== Filmography (as director) ====
Year	Title	Notes
1978	The Punk Rock Movie	
1997	Dancing in the Streets: Planet Rock	TV movie
1997	Dancehall Queen	
2000	The Clash: Westway to the World	Documentary
2003	The Essential Clash	Video
2003	One Love	
2004	Making of 'London Calling': The Last Testament	Video
2005	Punk: Attitude	TV movie
2005	The Revolution Will Not Be Televised: Gil Scott-Heron	
2005	Brother from Another Planet: Sun Ra	
2006	The Making of All Mod Cons: The Jam	
2006	Tales of Dr. Funkenstein: George Clinton	
2006	Rock It to Rio: Franz Ferdinand	
2007	Soul Britannia	
2008	The Clash Live: Revolution Rock	TV movie
2009	Carnival!	
2010	Strummerville	
2011	Rock 'N' Roll Exposed: The Photography of Bob Gruen	
2012	Subculture	
2016	The Story of Skinhead	

==== Music videos ====
Year	Title	Artist
1977	"White Riot"	The Clash
1978	"Tommy Gun"	The Clash
1979	"London Calling"	The Clash
1980	"Sister Europe"	The Psychedelic Furs
1980	"Bankrobber"	The Clash
1980	"The Call Up"	The Clash
1981	"This Is Radio Clash"	The Clash
1982	"Rock the Casbah"	The Clash
1982	"Should I Stay or Should I Go"	The Clash
1982	"Pass the Dutchie"	Musical Youth
1982	"Back on the Chain Gang"	The Pretenders
1982	"Youth of Today"	Musical Youth
1983	"The More I See (The Less I Believe)"	Fun Boy Three
1983	"Got to Have You Back"	The Undertones
1983	"War Party"	Eddy Grant
1983	"Everyday I Write the Book"	Elvis Costello and the Attractions
1983	"Party Train"	The Gap Band
1984	"One Love"	Bob Marley and the Wailers
1984	"Waiting in Vain"	Bob Marley and the Wailers
1984	"Round and Round"	Ratt
1985	"The Bottom Line"	Big Audio Dynamite
1986	"E=MC2"	Big Audio Dynamite
1986	"Medicine Show"	Big Audio Dynamite
1986	"C'mon Every Beatbox"	Big Audio Dynamite
1987	"V. Thirteen"	Big Audio Dynamite
1988	"Just Play Music!"	Big Audio Dynamite
1989	"James Brown"	Big Audio Dynamite
1989	"She Gives Me Love"	The Godfathers
1990	"Get Up, Stand Up"	The Wailers
1994	"Deep Forest"	Deep Forest
1995	"In the Name of the Father"	Black Grape
1996	"Don't Take My Kindness for Weakness"	The Heads with Shaun Ryder

== Quotes ==
"A good idea attempted is better than a bad idea perfected." – Don Letts to The Guardian
