= V Festival =

British music festival

- Genre: Music
- Frequency: Annually (penultimate weekend in August)
- Locations: Temple Newsham, Leeds; Hylands Park, Essex; Weston Park, Staffordshire
- Years active: 1996–2017, 2020
- Inaugurated: 17 August 1996; 30 years ago
- Founder: Richard Branson
- Most recent: 21 August 2020 – 23 August 2020
- Participants: See lineups
- Attendance: 170,000 (2015)
- Capacity: 90,000
- Organiser: Virgin Group
- Sponsor: Virgin Media
- Website: vfestival.com

V Festival, often referred to as V Fest or simply V, was an annual music festival held in the United Kingdom during the third weekend in August. The "V" represented the Virgin Group, with the event being sponsored by Virgin Media.

The event was held at two parks simultaneously which shared the same bill; artists performed at one location on Saturday and then swapped on Sunday. The sites were located at Hylands Park in Chelmsford and Weston Park in South Staffordshire. In 2017, the final year of this format, the capacity of each site was 90,000.

Richard Branson announced on 30 October 2017 that V Festival would be discontinued but that a new festival would replace it. In 2018, a new festival called "Rize" was held in on the same weekend as the "V Festival" but only at Hylands Park. However, on 5 August 2020, it was announced that the "V Festival" was to return to Hylands Park, without an audience (due to the COVID-19 pandemic), later that month.

It was originally televised by Channel 4 from 1997 to 2013, predominantly on its sister channel 4Music, with the exception of the 2003 event with ITV in charge. It was then televised by MTV from 2014 to 2015, and the 2016 edition of the festival was televised by Channel 5. ITV returned to televising the V Festival upon its return in 2020, with coverage hosted by Joel Dommett and Maya Jama.

== History ==
The idea for V came in 1996 when Pulp's front man Jarvis Cocker said that he would love to play two outdoor venues in two days. Pulp's promoters got together and came up with the idea of putting the gig into Victoria Park Warrington and Hylands Park Chelmsford giving fans in both the North and South a chance to see the band. Then came the idea of adding more bands to the bill, putting on a second stage and letting people camp for the weekend. In the end Victoria Park was just too small for three stages and camping. So in August 1996 there was one day of artists in Victoria Park and two days at Hylands Park with camping. The northern leg of V97 was switched to Temple Newsam, Leeds to provide room for camping and three stages. In 1999 the Northern leg of the festival was moved to Weston Park in Staffordshire, and has remained there since.

Previously it had been held at Temple Newsam in Leeds, before being replaced by Carling's Leeds Festival. Originally, the festival took the name of the current year, with the first festival being named "V96". Since 2003 it has been known as simply the V Festival. Its weekend format, low queuing times and professional organisation have given it a loyal audience. The festival sold out in record time in 2006.

Melanie C, Dido, and N.E.R.D. have all performed at the festival, and both Razorlight and Faithless performed in 2006. V showcases a mix of British and international musicians, from up-and-coming bands such as Coldplay in 2000 and the Kaiser Chiefs in 2003 and 2008, and glam rockers El Presidente in 2005, to veteran crooner Tony Christie. Girls Aloud also performed at the 2006 show, and received rave reviews for their performance. V97 was the first V Festival to be webcast. This was audio-only, and had about 30,000 unique listeners.

== Festivals and line-ups by year ==
=== V96 ===
The first V festival took place on Saturday 17 and Sunday 18 August 1996, and had two stages and one tent.

- V stage: Pulp, Paul Weller, Supergrass, The Charlatans, Cast, Lightning Seeds, Gary Numan, Shed Seven, Stereolab, Incognito, Jonathan Richman, The Mike Flowers Pops, Longpigs, Edge Park
- 2nd Stage: Elastica, Sleeper, Heavy Stereo, Menswear, Fluffy, The Cardigans, Super Furry Animals, The Wannadies, Denim, Kula Shaker, Gorky's Zygotic Mynci, Space, Tiger, Pusherman, Orbital
- Dance Arena: Tricky, The Aloof, Morcheeba, Lamb, Mad Professor, Alan Hale & Helen Welch, Delta

=== V97 ===
This year introduced the NME stage.

- V Stage: Blur, The Prodigy, Kula Shaker, Beck, Dodgy, Foo Fighters, Reef, Placebo, Pavement, Fluke, Teenage Fanclub, Apollo 440, The Supernaturals, Echobelly, Linoleum
- NME Stage: Ash, The Bluetones, Mansun, Gene, The Divine Comedy, Longpigs, Monaco, Echo & the Bunnymen, Symposium, Geneva, Silver Sun, Veruca Salt, Embrace, Hurricane#1, AC Acoustics, Stereophonics, The Driven, Radish
- Virgin High Energy Tent: The Chemical Brothers, Daft Punk, Dreadzone, Propellerheads, Death in Vegas, Sneaker Pimps, GusGus, Lionrock, Jimi Tenor, Olive, Finley Quaye, Bentley Rhythm Ace, Carl Cox, Trademark

=== V98 ===
- V Stage: The Verve, The Charlatans, The Seahorses, Texas, Green Day, Robbie Williams, The Lightning Seeds, Space, Iggy Pop, James, Chumbawamba, Stereophonics, Marion, Feeder, Whale, Rialto, Young Offenders, Headswim
- NME Stage: Underworld, Fun Lovin' Criminals, The Jesus and Mary Chain, Ian Brown, Catatonia, PJ Harvey, Saint Etienne, Morcheeba, Lo Fidelity Allstars, Republica, Gomez, The Dandy Warhols, The Montrose Avenue, theaudience, Midget, One Lady Owner, Superstar, The Smiles
- Dance Tent: James Brown, All Saints, Roni Size, K-Gee, Björn Again, Cornershop, Roachford, 67y, Karen Ramirez, Faithless, Regular Fries, DJ Norman Jay, Tin Star, Lionrock, Dean Thatcher, Moloko, Boom Boom Satellites, Disque Blu, Cuba

=== V99 ===
- V Stage: Manic Street Preachers, Suede, The Beautiful South, Stereophonics, Placebo (withdrew owing to illness, replaced by Kula Shaker), Supergrass, Happy Mondays, Cast, The Levellers, Gomez, Faithless, The Cardigans, Eagle-Eye Cherry, Afro Celt Sound System, The Saw Doctors, Melanie C
- NME Stage: James Brown, Massive Attack, Super Furry Animals, Mercury Rev, Shed Seven, DJ Shadow, Travis, Gay Dad, dEUS, Red Snapper, A, Death in Vegas, Dot Allison, Eve 6, Liz Horman, YY29, Medal, One Lady Owner
- JJB Arena Stage: Orbital, Finley Quaye, lan brown Lamb, Rae & Christian, Freestylers, Sneaker Pimps, The Egg, Groove Armada, Mishka, Richie Hawtin, Luke Slater, Regular Fries, Technique, ManCHILD, Archive
- Reebox Arena: Paul Oakenfold, DJ Sneak, Dave Ralph, Derek Carter, Dope Smugglaz, Justin Robertson, Aphrodite, Dave Angel, Jumping Jack Frost, Andy Weatherall, Layo, Mr. C, Matthew B

=== V2000 ===
- Richard Ashcroft (of The Verve) goes solo and Travis unveil their cover of Britney Spears' "...Baby One More Time" which they had already played at Glastonbury Festival in June 2000.
- V Stage: Travis, Richard Ashcroft, Macy Gray, Paul Weller, Ocean Colour Scene, James, All Saints, Cypress Hill, Morcheeba, Barenaked Ladies, Semisonic, Brand New Heavies, The Bootleg Beatles, Björn Again, Andreas Johnson, Toploader
- MTV Stage: Supergrass, Moby, Mansun, Beth Orton, Bloodhound Gang, Joe Strummer, Saint Etienne, Feeder, Dum Dums, The Dandy Warhols, Soulwax, Coldplay, Hefner, SX 10, Big Leaves, The Webb Brothers, Pacifica
- JJB Puma Arena: Underworld, Leftfield, The Flaming Lips, Death in Vegas, Moloko, Groove Armada, Bentley Rhythm Ace, Kelis, M. J. Cole, Horace Andy, Jamelia, Day One, ManCHILD, LSK (musician), Emilíana Torrini, Hybrid, Dara
- Shockwaves Club Tent: Pete Bromley, Sander Kleinenberg, Guy Ornadel, Sasha, Seb Fontaine, Hybrid, Junkie XL, Lee Burridge, Dean Wilson, Craig Richards

=== V2001 ===
- V Stage: Texas, Red Hot Chili Peppers, The Charlatans, Foo Fighters, Coldplay, David Gray, Faithless, Placebo, Embrace, Neil Finn, Nelly Furtado, Idlewild, The Spooks, Powderfinger, Jimmy Barnes, Witness
- WTV Stage:, Muse, Toploader, JJ72, The Divine Comedy, Shed Seven, Doves, Wheatus, Public Image Limited, Starsailor, Ben Folds, Nina Persson, Spearhead, Webb Brothers, Phoenix, Turin Brakes, Snow Patrol, Ed Harcourt, Ben's Symphonic Orchestra, Lifehouse (Hylands Park only), Santa's Boyfriend (Weston Park only)
- JJB Puma Arena: Kylie Minogue, Ian Brown, The Avalanches, Grandaddy, Mos Def, Tricky, Alabama 3, Sparklehorse, Zero 7, Rae and Christian, Atomic Kitten (Weston Park only both days), Red Snapper (Hylands Park only both days), Hooverphonic, Alfie, Big Dog, The Bush The Tree And Me, Relish
- Slinky Dance Tent: Daniel Bailey, Andy Passman, Garry White, Scott Nuskool, Matt Cassar, Marc Vedo, Dave Lea, John Dale

=== V2002 ===
- V Stage: Stereophonics, The Chemical Brothers (switched to V Stage), Alanis Morissette, Primal Scream, Nickelback, Gomez, Supergrass, Starsailor, Elvis Costello, Counting Crows, The Bluetones, Kosheen, Mull Historical Society, Beverley Knight, Ed Harcourt, Rhianna
- NME Stage: Basement Jaxx, Manic Street Preachers (replaced Travis), Ian Brown, Doves, The Beta Band, Idlewild, Sigur Rós, Elbow, My Vitriol, The Coral, Halo, The Donnas, Athlete, Seafood, The Burn, Phantom Planet (Hyland Park only), The Leaves, Crescent, Longview
- JJB Puma Stage: Badly Drawn Boy, Groove Armada, Turin Brakes, Soft Cell, Paul Heaton, Lamb, Stereo MCs, Röyksopp, McAlmont and Butler, Sugababes, Gemma Hayes, Custom, Damien Rice, Ashton Lane, Kid Galahad, Venus Hum, Montana High Rise, Rachel Mari Kimber
- Strongbow Golden Dance Arena: Stanton Warriors, David Holmes, Adam Freeland, Unkle, Plump DJs, DJ Touché, Ali B, Medicine, Dean Wilson, Pete Bromley, James Camm, Sounds, Freestylers, Tayo, Complete Communion, Dean Wilson

=== V2003 ===
- V Stage: Coldplay, Red Hot Chili Peppers, Foo Fighters, David Gray, Ash, Queens of the Stone Age, The Hives, PJ Harvey, The Cardigans, Morcheeba, Reel Big Fish, Inspiral Carpets, Echo & the Bunnymen, Skin, Eisley, Tom McRae
- NME Stage: Feeder, Underworld, Turin Brakes, The Coral, Killing Joke, Tim Burgess, Athlete, Evan Dando, Damien Rice, The Distillers, The Bees, Shack, The Basement, Spearhead, Martin Grech, Haven, The Futureheads, The Stands, Rachel Mari Kimber, The Zutons Super Furry Animals
- JJB Puma Arena: Lemon Jelly, Kosheen, Moloko, Asian Dub Foundation, Goldfrapp, Appleton, David Holmes, Mint Royale, Misteeq, Dirty Vegas, I Am Kloot, GusGus, Slovo, Jamie Cullum, Uncut, Amy Winehouse, The Rainband, Just Jack, Bell X-1, Speedway, Mankato
- Strongbow Golden Dance Arena: Jon Carter (Hyland Park only), Jacques Lu Cont (Weston Park only), Way Out West, Junior Sanchez, Freq Nasty, West London Deep, Freestylers, Themroc, Barry Ashworth, Will White, Tayo

=== V2004 ===
- V Stage, Muse, The Strokes, Dido, Pixies, The Charlatans, N.E.R.D, Faithless, The Thrills, Pink, Badly Drawn Boy, Athlete, Snow Patrol, The Divine Comedy, Jamie Cullum, Big Brovaz, Kosheen
- NME Stage, Kings of Leon, Massive Attack, Embrace, Starsailor, Elbow, Black Rebel Motorcycle Club, Keane, Scissor Sisters, Dashboard Confessional, The Zutons, The All-American Rejects, Fountains of Wayne, The Killers, Mull Historical Society, Hal, Goldie Lookin Chain, Thirteen Senses, Chikinki, 10,000 Things, Kasabian, Blacklight
- JJB Puma Arena, Basement Jaxx, Primal Scream, Kelis, Groove Armada, Amy Winehouse, Beverley Knight, The Human League, Audio Bullys, Jamelia, Roni Size, Freestylers, Kristian Leontiou, Aqualung, Josh Ritter, Phoenix, Chicane, Rodrigo y Gabriela, Fried, Backlight, Headway
- New Band Stage: The Bees, Delays, Hope of the States, The Stands, Longview, The Concretes, Tim Booth, South, Easyworld, InMe, The Dead 60s, The Infadels, The Crimea, Thea Gilmore, Cath Davey, Jerry Fish & The Mudbug Club, Kevin Mark Trail, Rooster, Polly Paulsuma, The Casuals, Colour of Fire, Magnet, Mohair, Stateless

=== V2005 ===
The 10th V Festival took place from Saturday 20 August to Sunday 21 August 2005, headlining with Oasis, Franz Ferdinand, and Scissor Sisters. Performing acts included:

Chelmsford Saturday/Staffordshire Sunday:

- V Stage: Oasis, The Streets, Maroon 5, The Zutons, Jet, The La's, Goldie Lookin Chain, The Stands, Vulcan
- Channel 4 Stage: The Chemical Brothers, Doves, Kaiser Chiefs, The Bravery, Good Charlotte, KT Tunstall, The Magic Numbers, The Departure, Tom Vek, Road To V Winner
- JJB Puma Arena: Texas, Robert Plant, Sonic Youth, The Polyphonic Spree, Lucie Silvas, The Proclaimers, The Presidents of the United States of America, Tom Baxter, Emilíana Torrini, Tara Blaise

Chelmsford Sunday/Staffordshire Saturday:

- V Stage: Scissor Sisters, Franz Ferdinand, Embrace, Athlete, Joss Stone, Tony Christie, Idlewild, Rooster
- Channel 4 Stage: The Prodigy, The Hives, The Music, Turin Brakes, The Ordinary Boys, Thirteen Senses, I Am Kloot, The Frames, El Presidente, No Hope In New Jersey
- JJB Puma Arena: Ian Brown, The Roots, Dizzee Rascal, Goldfrapp, Natasha Bedingfield, Jem, Estelle, BodyRockers, k-os, Tyler James
- Volvic Stage (across the weekend): Super Furry Animals, Nine Black Alps (replaced 22-20s), The Kooks, Kubb, Morning Runner, Stephen Fretwell, Róisín Murphy, Ray LaMontagne, Tooty Reynolds

=== V2006 ===
The 11th V Festival took place on Saturday 19 August and Sunday 20 August.

Tickets for the festival went on sale on Monday 27 February, exclusively to Virgin Mobile customers, and went on general sale on Friday 3 March.

There were complaints from festival-goers in 2006 due to the excessive price of food and merchandise, and lack of prior information about the band schedules, the only timetable available being a programme sold at the festival. Despite knowing the numbers attending, the print run of programmes was sold out.

The "Road To V" competition for 2006 was won by Bombay Bicycle Club and Keith.

- V Stage: Radiohead, Morrissey, Faithless, Paul Weller, Beck, Keane, Bloc Party, Sugababes, Hard-Fi, The Magic Numbers, The Dandy Warhols, Kubb, Gavin DeGraw, The Divine Comedy, The Dead 60s, Daniel Powter
- Channel 4 Stage: Razorlight, The Charlatans, Starsailor, James Dean Bradfield, Delays, The Feeling, Morning Runner, The Rifles, Dogs, Kasabian, Editors, The Ordinary Boys, We Are Scientists, The Cardigans, Orson, Kula Shaker, Biffy Clyro, The Saw Doctors
- JJB/Puma Arena: Groove Armada, Rufus Wainwright, The Beautiful South, Gomez, Nerina Pallot, Imogen Heap, Richard Hawley, Bic Runga, Lily Allen, Mutemath, The Boy Least Likely To, Fatboy Slim, The Go! Team, Girls Aloud, Kano, Echo & the Bunnymen, Xavier Rudd, Matt Willis, Shack, Phoenix, Pure Reason Revolution, Rushmore
- Virgin Mobile Social: The Cooper Temple Clause, The Dears, Bell X1, The Pipettes (Weston Park only), The Crimea, Oceansize, Liam Frost and the Slowdown Family, Jim Noir, Lorraine, James Morrison, Butch Walker, The Grates, The Dodgems, Love Bites, Sandi Thom, Mew, Regina Spektor, My Morning Jacket, Matisyahu (Hylands Park Only), Art Brut, The Young Knives, Captain, The Upper Room, Paolo Nutini, Seth Lakeman, Director, Milk Teeth

=== V2007 ===
The line-up for V Festival 2007 was revealed on Virgin Radio on Monday 26 February 2007 and tickets went on sale on 1 March.

The line-up was as follows:

- V Stage: The Killers, Foo Fighters, Kasabian, Snow Patrol, Vulcan, James, Pink, The Fratellis, Kanye West, KT Tunstall, Paolo Nutini, James Morrison, Editors, The Goo Goo Dolls, The Proclaimers and Just Jack.
- Channel 4 Stage: The Kooks, Manic Street Preachers, Lily Allen, Mika, Guillemots, The Hours, Basement Jaxx, The Coral, Babyshambles, Jet, The Fray, The Cribs and Captain, as well as Road To V winners Rosalita and The Brightlights. Foo Fighters also performed an acoustic set under the name 606.
- JJB/Puma Arena: Damien Rice, Corinne Bailey Rae, Iggy Pop & The Stooges, Lemar, Willy Mason, Rilo Kiley, McFly, Sophie Ellis-Bextor, Mutya Buena, Seth Lakeman. Primal Scream, Happy Mondays, Jarvis Cocker, Ocean Colour Scene, Dizzee Rascal, Sinéad O'Connor, Beverley Knight, Martha Wainwright, Glenn Tilbrook & The Fluffers, Jesse Malin and Chungking.
- Virgin Mobile Union: Graham Coxon, Robyn, Stephen Fretwell, Bedouin Soundclash, Air Traffic, The Rumble Strips, Remi Nicole, Cherry Ghost, Tiny Dancers, Unklejam, Passenger, The Dodgems, Rodrigo Y Gabriela, Boy Kill Boy, Plan B, The Holloways, Mr Hudson & The Library, Mumm-Ra, Switches, The Wombats, Ghosts, The Hoosiers, Pop Levi and Rebecca.

Amy Winehouse was supposed to play but cancelled due to admittance into rehab. She was replaced by Happy Mondays. Babyshambles were four hours late for their set at Weston Park after being held up by traffic. Robyn replaced The Bravery.

=== V2008 ===
Day	V Stage	4Music Stage	JJB Champion Arena	Virgin Mobile Union	Sessions Stage
Hylands Park Saturday / Weston Park Sunday	Muse; Stereophonics; The Kooks; Maxïmo Park; Lostprophets; Alanis Morissette; The Futureheads; Michael Franti and Spearhead	The Prodigy; The Pigeon Detectives; Newton Faulkner; The Hoosiers; Duffy; Amy Macdonald; The Hold Steady; Shed Seven; Air Traffic	Ian Brown; The Pogues; Michelle Bateman; Jamie T; The Twang; Sugababes; Estelle; David Jordan; The Script; The Presets; Royworld	Richard Hawley; Sia; Siouxsie Sioux; Will Young; The Long Blondes; Roots Manuva; The Dykeenies; Paul Heaton; Tokyo Police Club; Beth Rowley; The Like; Runaway Sons	Carbon/Silicon; Infadels; Bryn Christopher; Team Waterpolo; One Eskimo; Julian Velard; Gary Go; Iglu & Hartly; Sparkadia; The Troubadours
Hylands Park Sunday / Weston Park Saturday	The Verve; Kings of Leon; Amy Winehouse; Lenny Kravitz; The Feeling; Girls Aloud; Squeeze; The Stranglers; Gay Dad	Kaiser Chiefs; The Zutons; The View; Reverend and the Makers; Scouting For Girls; OneRepublic; The Courteeners; Delays; The Rifles; The Rebs	The Chemical Brothers; The Charlatans; Hot Chip; Travis; Calvin Harris; Robyn; Sam Sparro; Alphabeat; Gabriella Cilmi; Taio Cruz; Captain	The Guillemots; Echo & the Bunnymen; The Young Knives; Little Man Tate; Tom Baxter; Drive-By Truckers; Goldie Lookin' Chain; Jack McManus; Passenger; Noah and the Whale; Sam Beeton	SugaRush Beat Company; Attic Lights; Emmanuel Jal; Magistrates; The New York Fund; The Dodos; Das Pop; Animal Kingdom; Arno Carstens; The Rushes; Sons of Albion

Tickets went on general sale on 7 March 2008 at 10 am, and sold out in 90 minutes.

On 26 June 2008 at 10 am, extra tickets for both venues went on sale.

=== V2009 ===
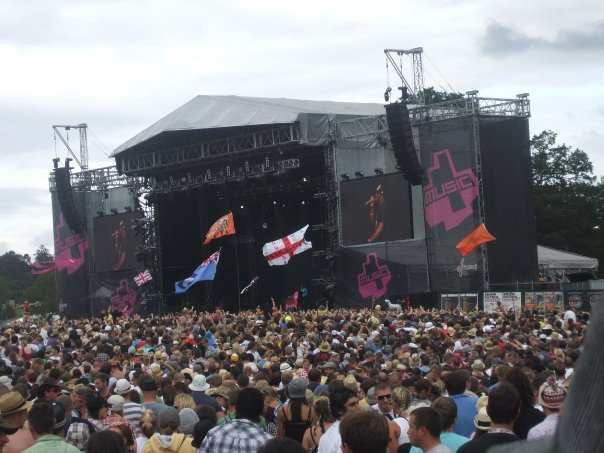
4music stage

Tickets for V 2009 went on general sale on 6 March 2009. A limited number of tickets went on sale at 10 am on 19 August 2008, following the end of the 2008 festival. Weekend tickets were priced at £132.50 (no camping) and £152.50 (with camping) for the weekend. On 2 March 2009 NME confirmed The Killers and Oasis as headliners. However, Oasis did not perform in Chelmsford due to frontman Liam Gallagher having viral laryngitis, as a result Snow Patrol filled in for the band. Oasis split-up as a band just a few days later, making their Staffordshire show their last until their reunion tour more than 16 years later.

The event was held on 22 & 23 August 2009.

Day	V Stage	4Music Stage	The Arena	Virgin Media Union
Hylands Park Saturday / Weston Park Sunday	The Killers; Taylor Swift; The Specials; Lily Allen; The Script; Vulcan; Razorlight; Starsailor; McFly	Fatboy Slim; Pendulum; The Ting Tings; The Wombats; Dizzee Rascal; The Noisettes; Red Light Company; Jet; Mr Hudson; Underline the Sky	2ManyDJs; Calvin Harris; Happy Mondays; The Saturdays; Will Young; Ladyhawke; N-Dubz; Asher Roth; Tinchy Stryder; Pixie Lott; Carolina Liar; Matt Trakker	Pete Doherty; Alphabeat; The Sunshine Underground; Howling Bells; Pete Murray; Goldie Lookin Chain; VV Brown; Kid British; Raygun; Wallis Bird; Zarif; Exit Calm
Hylands Park Sunday / Weston Park Saturday	Oasis; Snow Patrol; Elbow; James; Biffy Clyro; James Morrison; Ocean Colour Scene; Björn Again	Keane; The Enemy; Paolo Nutini; Katy Perry; Athlete; Alesha Dixon; The Proclaimers; The Lightning Seeds; The King Blues; The Last Republic	MGMT; Lady Gaga; The Streets; The Human League; Lemar; Natalie Imbruglia; Daniel Merriweather; Sneaky Sound System; Ben's Brother; The Blizzards	British Sea Power; The Twang; Mystery Jets; Gary Go; Seth Lakeman; Joe Lean and the Jing Jang Jong; Miike Snow; Vagabond; Iain Archer; The Gay Blades; One Eskimo

=== V2010 ===
The 2010 lineup for V Festival was officially announced on 11 March 2010 through the festival's site and on Absolute Radio. The headliners for both days were Kings of Leon and Kasabian. Tickets went on sale on 5 March 2010 at 9 am, with Virgin Media customers pre-sale tickets being available on 2 March, and Essex residents tickets being available on 4 March from 9 am. General sale tickets became available at 9 am on 5 March 2010. Organisers said they sold out in record time, just one and a half hours. Cheryl Cole was supposed to headline the Arena but had to cancel due to Malaria.

Day	V Stage	4Music Stage	Nissan Juke Arena	Virgin Media Union
Hylands Park Saturday / Weston Park Sunday	Kings of Leon; Stereophonics; Paul Weller; The Coral; Editors; The Courteeners; Passion Pit; Feeder	David Guetta; Florence and the Machine; White Lies; Scouting for Girls; The Temper Trap; Newton Faulkner; Paloma Faith; The Divine Comedy (Solo); The Magic Numbers; Daisy Dares You; The Pretty Reckless	Groove Armada; Chase & Status; Ellie Goulding; Robyn; Jason Derulo; Tinie Tempah; The Hoosiers; Joshua Radin; Hurts; Gabriella Cilmi; Diagram of the Heart	The Charlatans; Tricky; Mark Lanegan; Paul Heaton; Matt and Kim; Eli 'Paperboy' Reed; The Parlotones; Lissie; Goldie Lookin Chain; Alex Gardner; The High Wire; Chew Lips; White Belt Yellow Tag
Hylands Park Sunday / Weston Park Saturday	Kasabian(HL); Faithless; The Kooks; Paolo Nutini; Madness; Seasick Steve; Skunk Anansie; Pixie Lott	The Prodigy; Doves; Calvin Harris; Jamie T; Eels; Amy Macdonald; Shed Seven; Plan B; The Saw Doctors; Professor Green; Matthew P	Pet Shop Boys; Mika; Goldfrapp; La Roux; Sugababes; Kate Nash; Chipmunk; Diana Vickers; Example; Peter Andre; Tiffany Page	Air; Imogen Heap; Frightened Rabbit; Cherry Ghost; Rox; Sarah Blasko; Kirsty Almeida; Eliza Doolittle; Detroit Social Club; Jack McManus; Joe Brooks; The Boy Who Trapped the Sun; Joe Brooks; Rachel Furner

Line Up according to the official V Festival programme.

=== V2011 ===
Day	Virgin Media Stage	4Music Stage	Big Blue Tent	Virgin Media Undercover Stage
Hylands Park Saturday / Weston Park Sunday	Arctic Monkeys; Plan B; Kaiser Chiefs; Lostprophets; Bruno Mars; KT Tunstall; Ziggy Marley; Fun Lovin' Criminals	Dizzee Rascal; Razorlight; Tinie Tempah; Jessie J; Example; Olly Murs; Cast; Kids In Glass Houses; Aloe Blacc; Big Country; Kassidy	Chase & Status; Glasvegas; Katy B; Professor Green; Chipmunk; Kele Okereke; Labrinth; Clare Maguire; Wretch 32; Twenty Twenty; Wiz Khalifa	Goldie Lookin' Chain; Gomez; The Airborne Toxic Event; Chromeo; Yasmin; The Enemy; Frankmusik; Beardyman; Maverick Sabre; Alex Winston; Parade; Alice Gold; Morcheeba
Hylands Park Sunday / Weston Park Saturday	Eminem; Rihanna; The Script; Manic Street Preachers; Scouting For Girls; Ellie Goulding; Squeeze; Imelda May	Pendulum; Primal Scream (*); The Courteeners; The Wombats; N-Dubz; Good Charlotte; You Me At Six; Ocean Colour Scene; Noisettes; D12; The Knux	Calvin Harris; Mark Ronson & The Business Intl; Big Audio Dynamite; Hurts; The Saturdays; Eliza Doolittle; The Wanted; Dionne Bromfield; Chiddy Bang; Hanson (band); Slaughterhouse	Jaguar Skills; I Am Kloot; Stornoway; Bellowhead; The Pierces; Fenech-Soler; Hard Fi; The Mummers; Kitty Daisy & Lewis; Fitz and the Tantrums; Morning Parade; Emma's Imagination; Wolf Gang

- Pendulum headlined the 4Music stage but Primal Scream closed the stage.

=== V2012 ===
The final line-up for V Festival 2012 was announced on Tuesday 7 August. In contrast to previous years, some tickets remained on sale until the week of the festival.

Nicki Minaj cancelled her appearance at this weekend's festival because of damage to her vocal cords. LMFAO was moved up to headliner spot whilst DJ Fresh performed in LMFAO's place.

In the week running up to V Festival both Frank Ocean and Dappy were removed from the line up due to undisclosed reasons, they were replaced by The Charlatans and Wiley.

Performers such as Sean Lock and Milton Jones appeared in The Glee Club Comedy Tent.

Pop Artist James Wilkinson was appointed Official Artist to the V Festival. The first person to be appointed in 16 years of the Festival.

Day	Virgin Media Stage	4Music Stage	The Arena Stage	Virgin Media Undercover Stage
Hylands Park Saturday / Weston Park Sunday	The Stone Roses; Noel Gallagher's High Flying Birds; Example; Keane; James Morrison; Emeli Sandé; Rodrigo Y Gabriela; The Proclaimers	David Guetta; Friendly Fires; Ben Howard; Rizzle Kicks; Labrinth; Maverick Sabre; The Charlatans; Reverend and the Makers; Inspiral Carpets; The Twang	Ed Sheeran; Professor Green; Gossip; Sub Focus; Newton Faulkner; The Ting Tings; Wretch 32; Childish Gambino; Jack Beats; Cover Drive; Angel	Propaganda DJ's; Delilah; Niki and the Dove; Ren Harvieu; Tim Minchin; Devlin; Dot Rotten; Marlon Roudette; Aiden Grimshaw; Gabrielle Aplin; Random Impulse; Juan Zelada
Hylands Park Sunday / Weston Park Saturday	The Killers; Snow Patrol; Tinie Tempah; Tom Jones; Madness; Olly Murs; Tulisa; The Stranglers	Nicki Minaj; LMFAO; Noah and the Whale; Frank Turner; The Enemy; Miles Kane; Shed Seven; The Feeling; The Rifles; Dodgy	Nero; Happy Mondays; Pixie Lott; The Human League; Cher Lloyd; Frank Ocean; Beverley Knight; DJ Fresh; Rita Ora; Stooshe; Lawson	Australian Pink Floyd; The Milk; All The Young; Bo Bruce; Minus The Bear; Gentleman's Dub Club; Josh Osho; Conor Maynard; Mull Historical Society; Selah Sue; Lonsdale Boys Club; Nneka; Josh Kumra

=== V Festival 2013 ===
At the 2013 V Festival, Beyoncé made only her second and third European festival appearances of the calendar year. The other main stage headliner was Kings Of Leon, with headliners on other stages including Jamie Cullum, Basement Jaxx and former Swedish House Mafia DJ Steve Angello.

For the 2013 festival, one stage was renamed: the stage previously known as 'Virgin Media Undercover Tent' now became known as 'Futures Stage'. A poster released by the organisers initially seemed to suggest that the stage previously known as '4Music Stage' had been renamed as 'Stage 2', leading to speculation that Channel 4 had ended their sponsorship of the event, however a revised version of the poster released later reinstated the original name of the stage.

Multiple changes were made to the bill in the days leading up to the festival. Beady Eye were scheduled to headline opposite Beyoncé on the 4Music Stage, however they had to cancel all live shows through August 2013 because of the hospitalisation of member Gem Archer. Thus, their headlining slot on the 4Music Stage was taken over by Steve Angello, whose own previous headlining slot on The Arena Stage was taken over by Ocean Colour Scene. Ocean Colour Scene had themselves previously been scheduled to play an earlier timeslot on the main stage on the opposite day - that slot was taken over by Scouting For Girls, whose previous slot on the 4Music Stage was in turn taken over by previously unannounced act Reverend and The Makers. In unrelated developments, Little Mix were removed from the line-up for undisclosed reasons, and their fellow The X Factor winner James Arthur also cancelled his appearance the very day before the festival, citing a throat infection. Finally, on the official V Festival lanyard offered to festival attendees upon their arrival on site, it was confirmed that four previously unannounced acts had been added to the Futures Stage - these were James Bay, Hero Fisher, Gamu Nhengu and Paul McCartney's son James McCartney.

The majority of the line-up, with day and stage splits, was announced on 30 May 2013. With the Comedy Stage line-up announced later, as well as the changed outlines above, the full bill ended up as follows:

Day	Virgin Media Stage	4Music Stage	The Arena Stage	Futures Stage	Glee Club Comedy Tent
Hylands Park Saturday / Weston Park Sunday	Beyoncé; The Script; Jessie J; Two Door Cinema Club; Paloma Faith; James; Deacon Blue; The Fratellis	Steve Angello; The Courteeners; Fun.; Labrinth; Of Monsters & Men; Maverick Sabre; Lissie; Conor Maynard; The Pigeon Detectives	Ocean Colour Scene; DJ Fresh/Live; Travis; Mark Owen; Katy B; Jessie Ware; Netsky Live!; Gabrielle Aplin; Idris Elba; Nina Nesbitt; K-Koke	Benjamin Francis Leftwich; Monsta; Misha B; Hoffmaestro; Sam Smith; Tori Kelly; A*M*E; Goldie Lookin' Chain; Nell Bryden; Ed Drewett; Moya; Silhouette; Vox Empire	Eddie Izzard; Josh Widdicombe; Shappi Korsandi; Katherine Ryan; Andrew Bird; David Fulton; Eddy Brimson; Danny Slim Gray; Suzi Ruffell; Andrew Ryan; Nathan Caton; Justin Moorhouse; MC: Mark Olver
Hylands Park Sunday / Weston Park Saturday	Kings of Leon; Stereophonics; Emeli Sande; The Vaccines; Olly Murs; Jason Mraz; Scouting For Girls; The Saturdays	Calvin Harris; Rita Ora; Kendrick Lamar; Maxïmo Park; Rudimental; Seasick Steve; Tom Odell; Reverend & The Makers; The Heavy; Lawson	Basement Jaxx; Jaguar Skills; Ellie Goulding; Eels; Lianne La Havas; McFly; Everything Everything; Laura Mvula; John Newman; 5ive; The Original Rudeboys	Jamie Cullum; Naughty Boy; Lewis Watson; The Skints; Lucy Spraggan; Diana Vickers; James Skelly & The Intenders; Exit Calm; James Bay; James McCartney; Hero Fisher; Gamu	Jon Richardson; Paul Chowdhry; Rob Beckett; Andrew O'Neill; Ricky Grover; Imran Yusuf; Joel Dommett; Mark Simmons; Elis James; Fredrik Andersson; Peter Johansson; Angela Barnes; MC: Kevin McCarthy

=== V Festival 2014 ===
The 2014 V Festival was the first to be staged with the new shareholders Live Nation and new broadcaster and sponsor MTV, took place over the weekend of 16–17 August 2014. The main stage headliners were Justin Timberlake and The Killers, as announced at 8pm on Monday 3 March 2014, with tickets on general release the following Friday morning. Other high-profile bookings included Paolo Nutini and Ed Sheeran, who had between them released the two biggest-selling albums of the year up to the festival, and festival debutants included Chic featuring Nile Rodgers, Janelle Monáe and Kodaline.

Day	Virgin Media Stage	MTV Stage	The Arena Stage	Futures Stage	Glee Club Comedy Tent
Hylands Park Saturday / Weston Park Sunday	Justin Timberlake; Ed Sheeran; Example; Bastille; Kaiser Chiefs; Tom Odell; Kodaline; The Stranglers	Elbow; Manic Street Preachers**; Blondie; Miles Kane; The Wailers - performing Legend in full; John Newman; Pixie Lott; George Ezra; Starsailor; The Rifles	Alesso; Above & Beyond; Janelle Monáe; The Human League; Sophie Ellis-Bextor; James Arthur; Foxes; Kiesza; All Saints; Fuse ODG	Alex Clare; Birdy; Hoodie Allan; The Strypes; Icona Pop; Josh Record; Neon Trees; To Kill A King; Dan Croll	Alan Carr; Paul Chowdhry; Daniel O'Reilly (comedian); Jimmy McGhie*; Andrew Bird*; Jarlath Regan; Dave Fulton**; Ben Hurley; John Fothergill; Dave Twentyman*; Jim Smallman**; Boothby Graffoe; MC: Kevin McCarthy
Hylands Park Sunday / Weston Park Saturday	The Killers; Paolo Nutini; Lily Allen; Rudimental; Chic feat. Nile Rodgers; Train; Newton Faulkner; M People; The Saturdays	Axwell Λ Ingrosso; Tinie Tempah; Jason Derulo; Rizzle Kicks; Katy B; Childish Gambino; Sam Smith; Aloe Blacc; The Wonder Stuff; Sheppard	Chase & Status (DJ Set); Sub Focus; Rita Ora; Ceelo Green; Nina Nesbitt; Ella Eyre; Jess Glynne; Neon Jungle	Embrace; Howling Bells; Paul Heaton and Jacqui Abbott; Vance Joy; The Magic Numbers; Becky Hill; Chloe Howl; James Bay	Adam Hills; Rob Beckett; Andrew Maxwell; Geoff Norcott**; Phil Nichol; Pat Cahill; Matt Reed; Peter White; Matt Richardson; Keith Farnan; Andrew Askins; Steve Gribbin; MC: Charlie Baker

* Hylands Park only
**Weston Park Only

Manic Street Preachers had to cancel their show at Chelmsford due to being delayed in Budapest, Hungary at the airport after the Sziget Festival.

=== V Festival 2015 ===
==== Lineup ====
Line-up
Saturday 22 August - Hylands Park / Sunday 23 August - Weston Park	Saturday 22 August - Weston Park / Sunday 23 August - Hylands Park
Virgin Media Stage
Kasabian; Sam Smith; Hozier; The Courteeners; Annie Mac; James Bay; Marina and the Diamonds; Imelda May	Calvin Harris; The Script; Ellie Goulding; George Ezra; The Kooks; Ella Henderson; Gregory Porter; The Proclaimers
MTV Stage
Olly Murs; Tom Jones; Chvrches; Labrinth; Jess Glynne; Mark Ronson; Fuse ODG; Reverend and the Makers; Bleachers; The Coronas	Stereophonics; Clean Bandit; Kodaline; The Charlatans; Sigma; Maverick Sabre; Ella Eyre; Echo & the Bunnymen; Scouting for Girls; Hilltop Hoods
Sure Arena
Nero; Andy C; Example + DJ Wire; Pendulum; Tove Lo; MNEK; Aston Merrygold; Sinead Harnett; Seafret	Paloma Faith; Jessie Ware; Duke Dumont; De La Soul; LunchMoney Lewis; Nick Jonas; Wretch 32; Conor Maynard; Lawson; Indiana
The Dance Tent
Hannah Wants; Alex Adair; DJ EZ; MistaJam; Monki; My Nu Leng; Sam Feldt	Oliver Heldens; Goldie; Marvin Humes presents LuvBug; Moxie; Philip George; Toddla T
The Glee Club Comedy Tent
Frankie Boyle; Russell Kane; Nick Helm; Seann Walsh; Shappi Khorsandi; Gary Delaney

=== V Festival 2016 ===
==== Lineup ====
Line-up
Saturday 20 August - Hylands Park / Sunday 21 August - Weston Park	Saturday 20 August - Weston Park / Sunday 21 August - Hylands Park
Justin Bieber; Sia; Zara Larsson; Bastille; Jess Glynne; Troye Sivan; DNCE; Stormzy; Rita Ora; Mike Posner; John Newman; James Morrison; Faithless; Tinie Tempah; Flight Facilities; Foxes; DJ EZ	Rihanna; David Guetta; Little Mix; Kaiser Chiefs; Years & Years; Lukas Graham; Example; Katy B; Craig David; Travis; Big Sean; Sigma; All Saints; Fleur East; Jake Bugg; Tchami; Lethal Bizzle

Most of the line up was released on 22 February 2016.

=== V Festival 2017 ===
The 2017 V Festival Line Up was announced on 31 March 2017 with more acts added on 2 April 2017 and the full lineup poster on 20 April.

==== Lineup ====
Line-up
Saturday 19 August - Hylands Park / Sunday 20 August - Weston Park	Saturday 19 August - Weston Park / Sunday 20 August - Hylands Park
Virgin Media Stage
Pink; Craig David; Jess Glynne; George Ezra; Madness; James Arthur; Ella Eyre; Busted	Jay Z; Ellie Goulding; Stormzy; Emeli Sande; Jason Derulo; Clean Bandit; Jack Savoretti; Scouting For Girls
Second Stage
Rudimental; Sean Paul; Sigma; Anne-Marie; Jonas Blue; The Vamps; Calum Scott; Hey Violet	Pete Tong; Dizzee Rascal; The Wombats; Krept and Konan; JP Cooper; Raye; The Wailers; Giggs
JBL Dance Arena
Steve Aoki; Galantis; Don Diablo; Sigala; Alan Walker; Digital Farm Animals; Lost Kings	Gorgon City; Hannah Wants; Example & DJ Wire; Disciples; Fred V & Grafix; Toddla T; Tom Zanetti; Jama Supernova
The Glee Comedy Tent
Joel Dommett; Lee Nelson; Seann Walsh; Scott Bennett; Inel Tomlinson	Joe Lycett; The Rubberbandits; Dave Hill; Michael Fabbri; Rob Deering

=== V Festival 2020 ===
The 2020 V Festival was announced, alongside the headliners, on 5 August 2020. However, this festival went on hiatus caused by COVID-19 pandemic and a virtual one was held in its place, with performances from the festival's sets being broadcast by ITV2.

==== Lineup ====
Line-up
Friday 21 August - Hylands Park	Saturday 22 August - Hylands Park	Sunday 23 August - Hylands Park
Virgin Media Stage
Olly Murs; Izzy Bizu	Dizzee Rascal; Maisie Peters	Anne-Marie; Donel; Mae Muller

== Criticisms and reputation ==
The festival was noted for its commercial nature in comparison with other British music festivals. The V Festival received criticism for charging £10 to buy a programme - the only way festival-goers can see what time artists are performing - while others have mentioned the fact burgers cost £7 and water bottles are sometimes confiscated at the entrance, costing up to £2 once inside the grounds. Buying four crates on site would cost a person the same price as a ticket. Some fans have referred to the organisers of the event as 'greedy'.

Despite this, the New Statesman argues that the commercial nature has some advantages:
"Yet there are undeniable advantages to the [commercial] environment. V is a remarkably non-threatening festival, with few of the rougher edges prevalent at other large-scale gatherings."

The Evening Standard gave the 2009 festival 3/5 stars after headliners Oasis pulled out of the Hylands Park leg of the festival due to illness. Furthermore, approximately 800 people were injured, mainly due to falls causing sprains and ankle injuries.

In 2012, during Cher Lloyd's performance, the crowd booed and a bottle filled with urine was thrown at her, causing Lloyd to walk off stage. She came back on to finish her set but another bottle was thrown and she ended her set early.

== See also ==
- List of historic rock festivals
- List of music festivals in the United Kingdom
- V Festival (Australia)
- Virgin Festival
- Virgin Radio
