= Pacifica =

Pacifica may refer to:

== Art ==
- Pacifica (statue), a 1938 statue by Ralph Stackpole for the Golden Gate International Exposition

== Places ==
- Pacifica, California, a city in the United States
  - Pacifica Pier, a fishing pier
- Pacifica, a conceivable union of Guam, the Northern Marianas, and a number of the former Trust Territories of the United States in the central Pacific Ocean

== Media ==
- Pacifica Radio, a non-commercial radio network in the United States, founded on the principles of pacifism
- Federal Communications Commission v. Pacifica Foundation, a landmark court case for the regulation of indecency in U.S. broadcasting
- Pacifica, a newsletter published by the Association of Pacific Coast Geographers
- Pacifica (journal), theological journal

== Music ==
- Pacifica (band) trash Indie duo from Argentina
- Pacifica (Fred Frith album), 1998
- Pacifica (The Presets album)
- Pacifica Quartet, an American string quartet
- Yamaha Pacifica, a model of electric guitar

== Fictional ==
- Pacifica, a planet in "Manhunt" (Star Trek: The Next Generation)
- Pacifica Casull, a character in the Scrapped Princess anime
- Pacifica, a state in the Crimson Skies universe
- Pacifica, a state in the video game Shattered Union
- Pacifica, a bonus world in the Game Boy Advance version of Donkey Kong Country 3: Dixie Kong's Double Trouble!
- Pacifica, a nation that rivals the eastern alliance in the video game Fracture
- Pacifica, an underwater city in the TV series Stingray
- Pacifica, an airline in Flight Simulator X
- Pacifica, an underwater city in the 1971 TV movie City Beneath the Sea
- Pacifica Northwest, a character from the 2012 Disney Channel original TV series Gravity Falls

== Other uses ==
- Chrysler Pacifica, a nameplate used by Chrysler for a variety of vehicles
- Gavia pacifica, a species of loon
- Pacifica, a division of French insurance company Crédit Agricole
- Pacifica, the codename for computer x86 virtualization technology from AMD, now known as AMD-V
- Pacifica Forum, a disbanded white supremacist hate group based in Eugene, Oregon
- Pacifica Graduate Institute, an educational institution offering degrees in psychology, mythological studies, and the humanities
- Pacifica Inc., a women's organisation in New Zealand
- Pacifica Mamas, an arts collective based in Auckland, New Zealand
- Pacifica Air, Pacific Shipping, businesses owned by New Zealand entrepreneur Cliff Skeggs

== See also ==
- Pasifika (disambiguation)
- Pacifika, a Canadian world music group
- Pacifica High School (disambiguation)
