= Brydon =

Brydon may refer to:

- Brydon, West Virginia

== People with the name Brydon ==
- Lynne Brydon (PhD 1976), British anthropologist and gender studies academic
- Mary Brydon, British nurse
- Paul Brydon (cyclist) (born 1951), New Zealand road and track cyclist
- Rob Brydon (born 1965), Welsh actor and comedian
- William Brydon (1811–1873), assistant surgeon in the British East India Company Army

== See also ==
- Bryden, a surname
- Brydone, a surname
