= Losing Touch =

Losing Touch may refer to:

- "Losing Touch", 2000 single by My Vitriol from Finelines
- "Losing Touch", song by Barry Manilow from Even Now
- "Losing Touch", song by The Killers from Day & Age 2008
