= Bryden =

Bryden is a surname of Lowland Scots origin. Notable people with the surname include:

- Beryl Bryden (1920–1998), English jazz singer
- Bill Bryden (1942–2022), Scottish actor
- Dave Bryden (1927–2013), Australian footballer
- James Bryden (1877–1917), New Zealand cricketer
- James L. Bryden (1833–1880), British epidemiologist in India
- John G. Bryden (1937–2016), Canadian politician from New Brunswick
- John H. Bryden (born 1943), Canadian historian and politician from Ontario
- Kenneth Bryden (1916–2001), Canadian politician from Ontario
- Lewis Bryden (born 1944), American painter
- Marion Bryden (1918–2013), Canadian politician from Ontario
- Matthew Bryden, Canadian political analyst
- Nell Bryden (born 1977), American singer-songwriter
- Olivia Mary Bryden (1883–1951), English artist
- Philip Bryden, Canadian law professor
- Rod Bryden (born 1941), Canadian businessman and ice hockey team owner
- T. R. Bryden (born 1959), American baseball player
- Robert Alexander Bryden (1841–1906), Scottish architect

== Fictional characters ==
- Bryden Bandweth, a Black female teenager from Project Mc²
