= Brydone =

Brydone is a surname of Scottish origin. Notable people with the surname include:

- James Marr Brydone (1779–1866), Scottish surgeon.
- Patrick Brydone (1736–1818), Scottish traveller and author.
- Thomas Brydone (1837–1904), New Zealand land-company manager.

== See also ==
- Brydone, Southland
- Brydon (disambiguation)
- Bryden
