= Rosalita =

Rosalita may refer to:

- "Rosalita" (Al Dexter song), a 1944 song by Al Dexter
- "Rosalita (Come Out Tonight)", a song by Bruce Springsteen from his 1973 album The Wild, The Innocent & The E Street Shuffle
- "Rosalita", a song by Gomez from their 1999 album Liquid Skin
- Rosalita (band), a post-punk revival band from Ipswich, England
