= Benjamin Bloom (musician) =

British musician

- Born: Benjamin David Groom; 23 August 1982 (age 43); Ipswich, Suffolk, England
- Occupations: Pianist; Singer; Songwriter
- Years active: 2005–present
- Website: www.weirdandwonderfulshow.com

Benjamin Bloom (born Benjamin David Groom; 23 August 1982) is a pianist, singer and songwriter from Ipswich, Suffolk, England, and is a former member of the band Rosalita. He also is known for his football-based YouTube channel where he does match reviews and podcasts.

== Career ==
=== 2005 - 2009: Rosalita ===
As a member of Rosalita, Bloom toured constantly with the outfit until the band's split in 2009 playing and co-writing on each of the band's studio releases during that time. The band won the Channel 4 Road To V show with the final at the Carling Academy Islington on 16 May 2007 filmed and broadcast by Channel 4 in the UK and performed on the Channel 4 stage at V2007, playing directly before the Foo Fighters.

=== 2009 - 2010: Benjamin Bloom solo performer ===
After the breakup of Rosalita, Bloom made his first attempts as a solo songwriter and lead vocalist began performing gigs as a piano vocalist and having his music featured on BBC Introducing.

=== 2011 - 2012: Benjamin Bloom, Full Band ===
Having developed his act as a one-man show, Benjamin Bloom added a full band to his act and again caught the attention of BBC Introducing when he was selected to play at the 2012 Latitude Festival. Bloom and his band followed up their Latitude opportunity with appearances at venues and festivals around the UK.

==== Band members ====
- Joel Kurta - Drums
- Jay Goodrich - Bass
- Tiago Rosado - Guitar

==== Past members ====
- Matt Weston
- Tom Loydal
- Robert Cherowbrier
- Stuart Sale
- Carina Perrera
- Roberto Deliperi
- Andy Clarke

=== 2013 - present: Benjamin Bloom, Weird and Wonderful ===
Having toured the national gig circuit with his band, Benjamin Bloom started work on a theatre-based project named after his most successful single to date, "Weird and Wonderful". The show based around Blooms songbook and featuring cabaret and circus acts, big screen projection debuted at the New Wolsey Theatre in March 2013 to both commercial and critical acclaim, with a sell out performance.

With the success of his debut show, Bloom was asked to perform under The Big Top in Christchurch Park, Ipswich as part of the Ip-Art Festival, in June 2013 with a second sell out show and followed the performance with two nights at the 2013 Edinburgh Fringe festival.

In April 2014, Bloom took an improved version of Weird and Wonderful to the Colchester Arts Centre, again selling out the venue which was now narrated by Hugo Myatt, once the presenter of cult 1980s TV show Knightmare.

Having sold out four successive shows, Bloom was confirmed to play at the Ipswich Corn Exchange on 21 June 2014.

=== Discography ===
- The Benjamin Bloom EP (2011)
- Weird And Wonderful EP (2012)
- Benjamin Bloom Live CD (2013)
- Benjamin Bloom Live DVD (2013)
- Last Man On Earth (TBC)
