= The Brightlights =

UK musical group

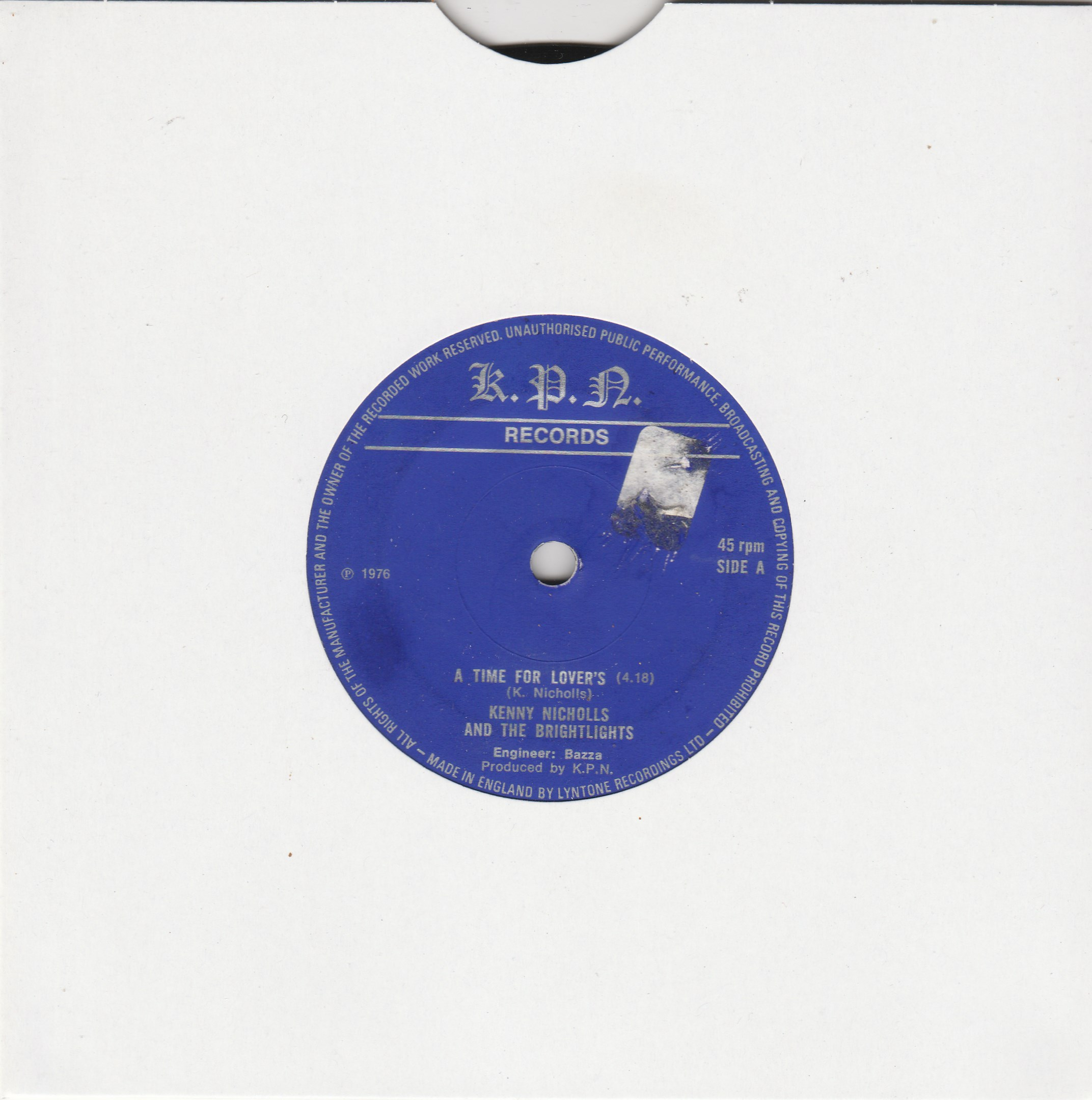

Background information
- Origin: Grimsby, United Kingdom
- Genre: Indie rock
- Years active: 2005–2008; 2022
- Label: Distiller
- Past members: Leon Blanchard; Adam Featherstone; Luke Parker; James Buxton

The Brightlights were a four-piece British indie rock band from Grimsby in North East Lincolnshire. They released their debut single, "Inspired By", on 5 November 2007. The single was produced by Feeder frontman Grant Nicholas.

== Biography ==
The Brightlights were formed in 2005 in the North East Lincolnshire conurbation towns of Grimsby and Cleethorpes, with all four members being from the towns.

=== 2007 ===
They appeared on the V Festival's "Road to V" competition in the summer of 2007. They subsequently won the competition along with Ipswich band Rosalita. They went on to appear regularly on Freshly Squeezed & Channel 4 Music with Alexa Chung & Rick Edwards.

In September 2007, The Guardian newspaper featured them as their 'New Band of the Day', commenting on Blanchard's "bloke-ishly rasping vocals".

In 2007, they featured on Richard Branson's new television project Virgin 1 and played at the launch party at his home in Oxfordshire with support from the band The Enemy.

=== 2008 and break-up ===
In early 2008, the band began recording their only album at The Crypt Studio in London with engineer and producer Matt Sime, who is most well known for producing Feeder's albums. That album has only recently been released 12 years after it was recorded.

The Brightlights were reportedly on the verge of becoming one of the biggest exports in modern UK guitar music and were one of the last bands to be offered a large five album deal advance by Jive/Zomba Records, before the label collapsed in 2011. However, the band were advised by management to hold out for bigger and better offers and in turn the deal was declined. Fashion writers Company Magazine printed a large two page article which predicted the band would become one of the biggest bands in the UK by 2012. With the decline in popularity of indie guitar music, combined with the decline of their most popular fanbase platform Myspace, the band were short lived and disbanded in late 2008.

=== Later years and 2022 reunion ===
The band since gave interviews stating that silent struggles with mental health and well being amongst band members ultimately attributed to the band's demise and they dedicated their album to anybody who suffers mental health conditions. The Brightlights represent one of the quickest and most un-documented rise & fall stories in popular band culture of the early noughties.

There were rumours circulating on social media networks that the band may be organising a comeback gig. On 18 November 2022, The Brightlights reformed for a special gig at KU Bar Stockton as part of their 20th Birthday celebrations. They then played a homecoming gig at Grimsby Docks Academy venue on 22 November that year. They have remained inactive since.

== Releases ==
The Brightlights were the first established band signed to Distiller Records, a label owned by Samuel Dyson, son of James Dyson. They released their debut single, "Inspired By", on 7" vinyl and download on 5 November 2007. Reviews were generally favourable. The video for the single was filmed in the band's hometown of Grimsby on the eastern coast of England. It was directed by Jay Burridge who has also worked on a video for Hot Chip. It features Shane Meadows cult drama This Is England's star Thomas Turgoose.

The Brightlights second single was titled "3". It reached the top 5 in the BBC Indie Charts beating both Kings Of Leon & Arctic Monkeys on weekly vinyl sales.

== Influences ==
The band have cited Arctic Monkeys, Morning Runner, Razorlight, Coldplay, The Kooks and Oasis as their influences - with Channel 4 Music describing them as "explosive melodic rock with a dark edge." They have been compared to the American indie rock band Kings of Leon.

== Members post-Brightlights ==
Adam Featherstone & Luke Parker went on to form a five-piece band called Old Arcadians which were active between 2008 - 2010.

Other associated bands include Casanova and Little Fears which all consisted of The Brightlights band members.

Leon Blanchard remains an active musician, currently performing and recording as Leon Blanchard & The Tiny Giants.

As of 2024, Luke Parker also continues to perform and record as the frontman of indie rock band Kid Spirit.
