= Pasifika =

Pasifika may refer to:

- Pacific Islander people, indigenous peoples of the Pacific Islands
  - Pasifika New Zealanders, Pacific peoples living in New Zealand
- Pacific Islands, including Melanesia, Micronesia and Polynesia
- The Pasifika Festival, an annual festival held in Auckland, New Zealand
- Pasifika TV, a New Zealand company providing television programmes to countries and territories in the Pacific region

== See also ==
- Arts Pasifika Awards, New Zealand
- Pacifica (disambiguation)
- Pacifika, a Canadian world music band
- Urban Pasifika, a style of Polynesian hip hop music
