= Finelines =

Studio album by My Vitriol
- Released: 5 March 2001
- Studios: Linford Manor, Milton Keynes
- Genres: Nu gaze; shoegaze; alternative rock
- Length: 48:02
- Label: Infectious
- Producers: Chris Sheldon; Som Wardner

My Vitriol chronology
Delusions of Grandeur (1998)	Finelines (2001)	A Pyrrhic Victory (2007)

Singles from Finelines
- 1. "Losing Touch" Released: 17 April 2000; 2. "Cemented Shoes" Released: 10 July 2000; 3. "Pieces" Released: 30 October 2000; 4. "Always: Your Way" Released: 12 February 2001; 5. "Grounded" Released: 7 May 2001

Finelines is the debut studio album by the British rock band My Vitriol. It was released on 5 March 2001 through Infectious Records. Initially consisting of a duo, My Vitriol released their debut EP Delusions of Grandeur (1998), before expanding to a four-piece. They signed to Infectious Records in December 1999, and began recording their debut album at Linford Manor in Milton Keynes, with Chris Sheldon, and frontman Som Wardner co-producing. Described as an alternative rock album, Finelines was compared to acts such as the Smashing Pumpkins, My Bloody Valentine, and Foo Fighters.

Between early 2000 and early 2001, My Vitriol released four singles – "Losing Touch", "Cemented Shoes", "Pieces", and "Always: Your Way" – prior to the release of Finelines. Fifth single "Grounded" appeared in May 2001, which was followed by support slots for the likes of Feeder, Ash, and Placebo. My Vitriol went on a headlining tour of the United Kingdom at the end of 2001, and followed it with a series of shows in the United States in early 2002. A remixed version of the album was released in July 2002, combined with the B-sides compilation Between the Lines.

Finelines received generally positive reviews from music critics, some of whom commented on the guitarwork. Finelines reached number 24 in the UK album charts, while all of its singles charted on the UK singles chart.

== Background and production ==
Vocalist/guitarist Som Wardner, formerly of Shock Syndrome, formed My Vitriol when he met drummer Ravi Kesavaram. The pair lived in the residence while attending college. A friend of their, who was studying as an engineer, suggested recording the duo as a project. The result was released as their debut EP Delusions of Grandeur (1998). One copy of the EP was given to BBC Radio 1 DJ Steve Lamacq, who subsequently aired one of the tracks. In the following months, songs from the demo appeared on various artists compilations, and received airplay in Asia, Europe and the UK. Progress with the band was halted due to the duo needing to finish their exams at college.

Following this, guitarist Seth Taylor and bassist Carolyn Bannister were recruited. Wardner met Bannister at college, and came across Taylor when he was playing a farewell show with his band Mint 400. My Vitriol released the double A-side single of "Always Your Way" and "Pieces" in December 1999, through Org Records. Two weeks after the single's release, the band received attention from the music press, airplay on BBC Radio 1, and sold-out shows. Despite only playing 7 shows thus far, My Vitriol signed a record deal with Infectious Records in late December.

My Vitriol recorded their debut album at Linford Manor. Chris Sheldon and Wardner co-produced all of the recordings, with the exception of "Kohlstream", "Ode to the Red Queen", and "Windows & Walls", which were produced solely by Wardner. Sheldon acted as the engineer for all of the songs, except for "Kohlstream", "Ode to the Red Queen", and "Windows & Walls", which were engineered by Toby Bush. Bush recorded the vocals for "The Gentle Art of Choking", and Dave Buchanan recorded the vocals for "Under the Wheels". Sheldon mixed all of the recordings, except for "Kohlstream", "Windows & Walls", and "Under the Wheels", which were co-mixed with Wardner.

== Composition and lyrics ==
Musically, the sound of Finelines has been described as alternative rock, with comparison to Foo Fighters, My Bloody Valentine, and the Smashing Pumpkins. Wardner's lyrics were reminiscent of the words of the Smashing Pumpkins frontman Billy Corgan. The album opens with "Alpha Waves", a two-minute instrumental track that was described as a jet engine taking off. "Always: Your Way" recalled the Foo Fighters' "This Is a Call" (1995). The intro to "The Gentle Art of Choking" recalled Ash. "Cemented Shoes" evokes the sound of Beaster (1993)-era Sugar. "Grounded" is a 1970s-esque power pop song, which followed by "C.O.R. (Critic-Oriented-Rock)", a 38-second-long track that sees Wardner screaming over nu metal guitarwork. "Tongue Tied" starts off slow, before speeding up and becoming heavier. "Losing Touch" comes across as a mix of Placebo, Sugar, and grunge, and is followed by the ballad "Pieces".

== Release ==
In March and April 2000, My Vitriol toured with Dark Star, Cay, and the Crocketts, leading up to the release of the single "Losing Touch" on 17 April. The single included "Tongue Tied", and a live cover of the Eugenius song "Breakfast" as extra tracks. In July, the band played with Wilt and A Perfect Circle, leading up to the single release of "Cemented Shoes" on 10 July. The single included "All of Me", and a cover of the Wipers song "Wait a Minute" as extra tracks. The following month, the band appeared at the Reading and Leeds Festivals, and supported Deftones for a one-off show. In early October, the band toured with King Adora and Crackout, which was followed by a tour later in the month with Mansun and King Adora, lasting until early November.

To coincide with the latter tour, "Pieces" was released as a single on 30 October. Two versions were released on CD: one with a cover of the Jawbox song "Static", and "Safety Zones & Crumple Zones", and the other with "Another Lie", and a live version of "Cemented Shoes". For the rest of November, the band toured with Vast. In February 2001, the band toured the UK with Mo-Ho-Bish-O-Pi, and Thirteen:13. Partway through the stint, "Always: Your Way" was released as a single on 12 February. Two versions were released on CD: one with a cover of the Guided By Voices song "Game of Pricks", and "Spotlights, and the other with "It Came Crashing", and an acoustic version of "Losing Touch".

Finelines was released on 5 March 2001. "Grounded" was released as the fifth single on 2 April 2001. Two versions were released on CD: one with a cover of the Madonna song "Oh Father" (1989), and an acoustic version of "Always: Your Way", and the other with "Deadlines", and a piano version of "Windows & Walls". The music video for the song premiered on NME's website. The release coincides with the band's support slot for Feeder's UK tour later in the month. The following month, the band supported Ash on their European tour; My Vitriol played various festivals across Europe and Japan between June and August.

In mid-July, the band announced they had signed to Epic Records in the United States; Finelines was remixed for release in that territory. In October, the band embarked on a supporting UK tour for Placebo, which was then followed by a headlining UK tour that lasted until early November, with support from Seafood and Queenadreena. On the headlining tour, the band gave away copies of a 7" vinyl single of "Vapour Trails". In March 2002, the band played a handful of shows in the US. In July 2002, the band went on another UK tour, with support from Halo, and Wilt. A week after the tour's conclusion, the remixed version of Finelines was released alongside Between the Lines, a compilation of B-sides, demos and acoustic recordings, in that territory.

== Reception ==
Professional ratings
Aggregate scores
Source	Rating
Metacritic	74/100
Review scores
Source	Rating
AllMusic	3/5 stars
Alternative Press	8/10
Drowned in Sound	10/10
Entertainment Weekly	B+
Exclaim!	Favorable
The Guardian	3/5 stars
NME	3/5 stars
No Ripcord	3/10
Ox-Fanzine	Favourable
Playlouder	Favorable

Finelines was met with generally positive reviews from music critics. At Metacritic, the album received an average score of 74, based on 9 reviews.

Drowned in Sound staff member Pamela Leader noted that while My Vitriol earned comparisons to the likes of Nirvana and the Foo Fighters, she felt they had "an original sound and style of their own ... I think you'll be able to recognise a My Vitriol song, not only by the style of music, but by the sound and charisma of Som Wardner's voice." Entertainment Weekly senior writer Dan Snierson said the band delivered "a compelling collage of urgent and moody alt-rock ... put[ting] their own stomp on the swerving layered-guitar formulas", by the likes of the Smashing Pumpkins and My Bloody Valentine. Ox-Fanzine's Joachim Hiller found it to be "surprisingly wavy and gloomy, but at the same time has that driving guitar sound that I find on the whole homestead I appreciated [in] bands".

Cam Lindsay of Exclaim! said the band merged "the two past movements [of grunge and shoegaze] in a perfect way to create their own brand of guitar rock." He added, "[o]f course, most of it sounds like Nirvana meets Ride, but it could be worse". Dotmusic writer Nichola Browne said the album was full of "deliciously raucous songs, dripping in bittersweet lyrics that'll smart your throat every time you try to sing along." NME's Mark Beaumont wrote that the album had "guitars soaring like hang-gliders, vocals whining like the distant slaughter of pigs, [and] drums plodding like Ann Widdecombe on a donkey ride."

AllMusic reviewer Dean Carlson called the band "elastic and kaleidoscopic as they take their particular screeching rock choruses to something distinctly American." He added, it was the type of debut release that "lurches into the grungy excess befitting trashcan fires, [and] anachronistic outsider idolization". The Guardian arts writer Caroline Sullivan said the songs "tread a catchy path delineated by imploring vocals and shiny choruses". Lee Ward of Playlouder said it "may well be too long and it might stick to its [Nirvana and My Bloody Valentine] blueprint a little too faithfully, but singularity of vision can hardly be criticised on a debut record." No Ripcord's David Coleman referred to it as "one of the most disappointing debut albums I've ever heard."

Finelines reached number 24 in the UK album charts, while the remixed version, with Between the Lines, peaked at number 96. "Losing Touch" charted at number 91 in the UK. "Cemented Shoes" charted at number 65 in the UK. "Pieces" charted at number 56 in the UK. "Always: Your Way" charted at number 31 in the UK. "Grounded" charted at number 29 in the UK.

== Track listing ==
All songs written by Som Wardner.

Finelines track listing
No.	Title	Producer	Length
1.	"Alpha Waves"	Chris Sheldon; Som Wardner	2:16
2.	"Always: Your Way"	Sheldon; Wardner	3:50
3.	"The Gentle Art of Choking"	Sheldon; Wardner	3:29
4.	"Kohlstream"	Wardner	0:26
5.	"Cemented Shoes"	Sheldon; Wardner	3:02
6.	"Grounded"	Sheldon; Wardner	2:31
7.	"C.O.R. (Critic-Orientated-Rock)"	Sheldon; Wardner	0:38
8.	"Infantile"	Sheldon; Wardner	3:48
9.	"Ode to the Red Queen"	Wardner	4:04
10.	"Tongue Tied"	Sheldon; Wardner	5:18
11.	"Windows & Walls"	Wardner	3:29
12.	"Taprobane"	Sheldon; Wardner	1:19
13.	"Losing Touch"	Sheldon; Wardner	3:03
14.	"Pieces"	Sheldon; Wardner	4:25
15.	"Falling Off the Floor"	Sheldon; Wardner	3:22
16.	"Under the Wheels"	Sheldon; Wardner	3:02
Total length:			48:02

== Personnel ==
Personnel per booklet.

My Vitriol

- Som Wardner – vocals, guitar, piano
- Ravi Kesavaram – drums
- Seth Taylor – guitar
- Carolyn Bannister – bass

Production

- Chris Sheldon – producer (all except tracks 4, 9 and 11), engineer (all except tracks 4, 9 and 11), mixing
- Som Wardner – producer, mixing (tracks 4, 11 and 16)
- Toby Bush – vocal recording (track 3), engineer (tracks 4, 9 and 11)
- Dave Buchanan – vocal recording (track 16)
- Kevin Westenberg – photography
- Craig Gentle – design, additional photography
- My Vitriol – design, additional photography

== Charts ==
Chart performance for Finelines
Chart (2001)	Peak position
Scottish Albums (Official Charts)	23
UK Albums (Official Charts)	24
UK Independent Albums (Official Charts)	2
UK Rock & Metal Albums (Official Charts)	2
