= James L. Bryden =

Scottish surgeon and medical statistician

James Lumsdaine Bryden (1833 – 18 November 1880) was a Scottish medical officer who worked in India as a surgeon-major. He was among the first to study the epidemiology of cholera in India and claimed that outbreaks could be predicted on the basis of various factors, most significantly the weather.

Bryden was born in Edinburgh and went to Edinburgh high school before going to the University of Edinburgh from which he received an MD in 1855. He received a gold medal for a thesis on sugar in the liver, as glycogen had then been discovered by Claude Bernard. He joined the East India Company Service as an assistant surgeon and reached Calcutta in December 1856. He escaped the 1857 rebellion from Mundlaisir and returned to Calcutta. He was posted in Lucknow and later in northern Bengal. He then became a statistical officer under the sanitary commissioner J.M. Cuningham working on cholera epidemiology. He believed that cholera was spread by an airborne agent and became an epidemic under specific conditions which he believed he could predict based on the weather. After 1870, the cholera germ theory became more dominant and led to his airborne theory being entirely dismissed later.

Bryden published Vital Statistics of the Bengal Presidency (1866–79), Epidemic Cholera in Bengal (1869), The Cholera History of 1875 and 1876 (1878) and numerous government reports.

He suffered from liver trouble and returned to England in September 1880 and died shortly after from kidney failure at Upper Norwood. He was married to Grace Edith, the daughter of Dr Brougham, Physician-General for Bengal Presidency, had two children. He was buried in Norwood cemetery.
