= Pacifica High School =

Pacifica High School may refer to:

- Pacifica High School (Garden Grove, California)
- Pacifica High School (Oxnard, California)

== See also ==
- Pacifica Christian High School
