= Brydon, West Virginia =

Unincorporated community in West Virginia, United States

Brydon
- Unincorporated community
- Location within the state of West Virginia Brydon (the United States)
- Coordinates: 39°16′48″N 80°3′53″W
- Country: United States
- State: West Virginia
- County: Taylor
- Elevation: 1,053 ft (321 m)
- Time zone: UTC-5 (Eastern (EST))
  - Summer (DST): UTC-4 (EDT)
- GNIS ID: 1549614

Brydon is an unincorporated community in Taylor County, West Virginia, United States.
