= James McNabb Cuningham =

British surgeon-general

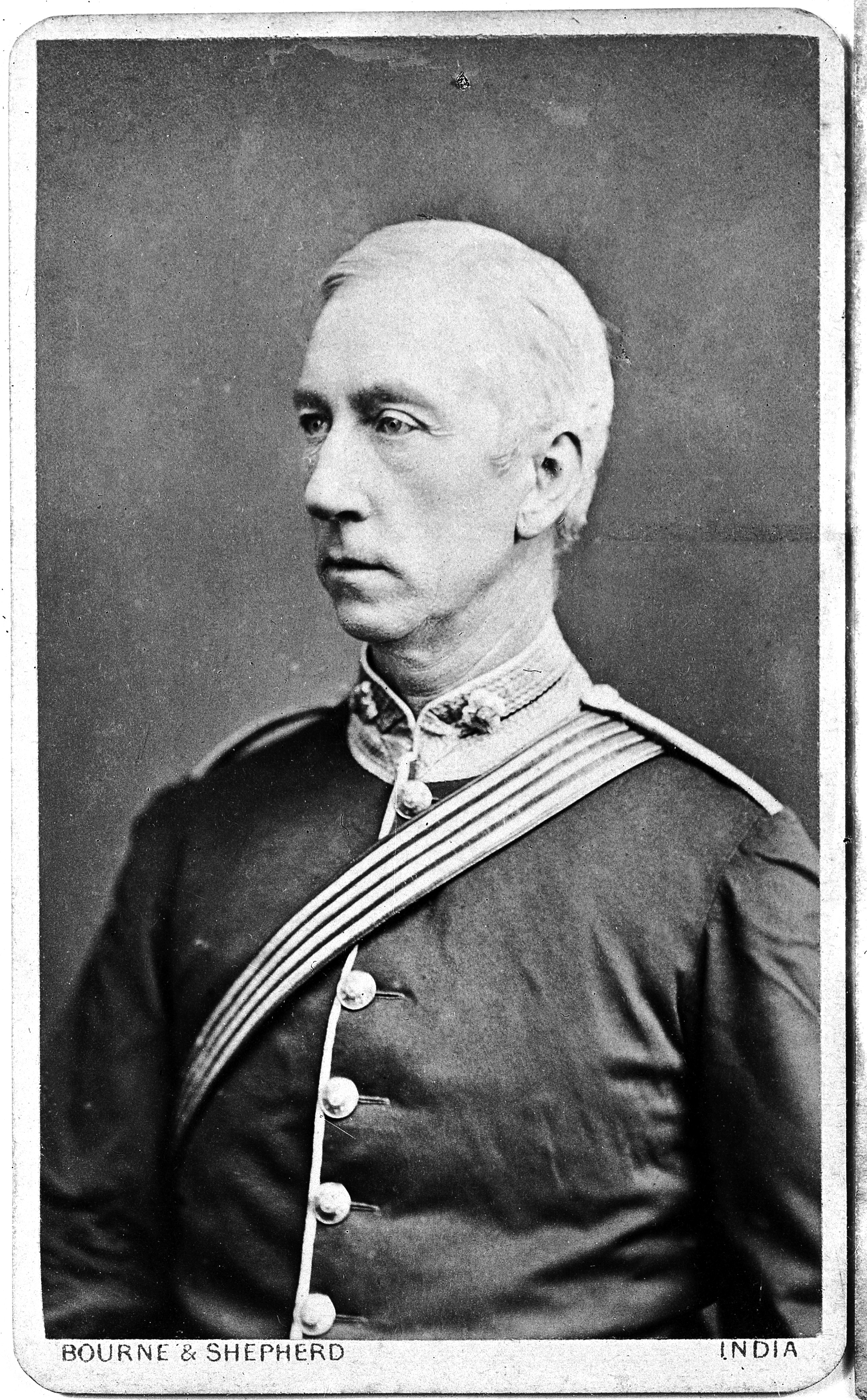
- Born: 2 June 1829
- Died: 26 June 1905 (aged 76); London
- Occupation: Physician

James McNabb Cuningham CSI (2 June 1829 – 26 June 1905) was a British surgeon-general in India.

== Biography ==
Cuningham was born on 2 June 1829. He was son of Major William Cunningham, of the 54th Bengal infantry, who entered the service in 1804 and retired on 18 May 1833. Cuningham, who modified the spelling of his surname, was born at the Cape of Good Hope, when his father was on leave from 1827 to 1829. He received his medical education at Edinburgh University, where he graduated M.D. in 1851, his thesis on the medical conditions of the aorta being commended. In 1892 he was made hon. LL.D. of Edinburgh.

Cuningham joined the Bengal medical service as an assistant surgeon on 20 November 1851; was promoted surgeon on 12 March 1864; surgeon-major on 20 November 1871, and surgeon-general on 29 March 1880, retiring on 31 March 1885. His first important charge in India was as superintendent of the central prison at Bareilly in 1861; he afterwards held a similar position at Meerut, and was appointed superintendent of the government press, north-west provinces, in 1863.

Cuningham was secretary of the sanitary commission appointed in 1866 under Sir John Strachey, first president, to report and advise on the health of European troops and on the sanitary state of India generally. He was made professor of hygiene at the Calcutta medical college in 1866; in 1869, sanitary commissioner for the Bengal presidency, and from 1875 until his retirement for the whole Indian empire. In 1880 he became in addition head of the Bengal medical department, with the rank of surgeon-general.

Cuningham's administrative faculties rather than scientific knowledge enabled him to carry through a great sanitary work. He wrote and spoke well, although his habit of mind tended to scientific agnosticism, and he doubted the value of bacteriological research. In the reorganisation of medical administration in India in 1880 Cuningham played a chief part. With Surgeon-general (afterwards Sir Thomas) Crawford, principal medical officer of the British forces in India, he drew up a report, known as the Crawford-Cuningham commission, for the complete amalgamation of the army medical department and the Indian medical service, which, issued in August 1881, was rejected by the war office. Cuningham left India on 4 April 1885, and on 16 June 1885 he was made C.S.I. He was appointed honorary surgeon to Queen Victoria on 15 August 1888, and from 1891 to 1896 was on the army sanitary committee, representing India in 1894 at the international sanitary conference at Paris.

He died in London on 26 June 1905. He was twice married: (1) on 2 March 1854, to Mary, only daughter of James McRae, and (2) to Georgina Euphemia, daughter of Robert Reid Macredie, on 11 April 1889. He left two sons and a daughter by the first marriage.

Cuningham was author of, besides official sanitary reports: 1. 'A Sanitary Primer for Indian Schools,' Calcutta, 1879. 2. 'Cholera; What the State can do to prevent it,' Calcutta, 1884, translated into German with a preface by Dr. Max von Pettenkofer, Brunswick, 1885.
