= My Vitriol =

British rock band

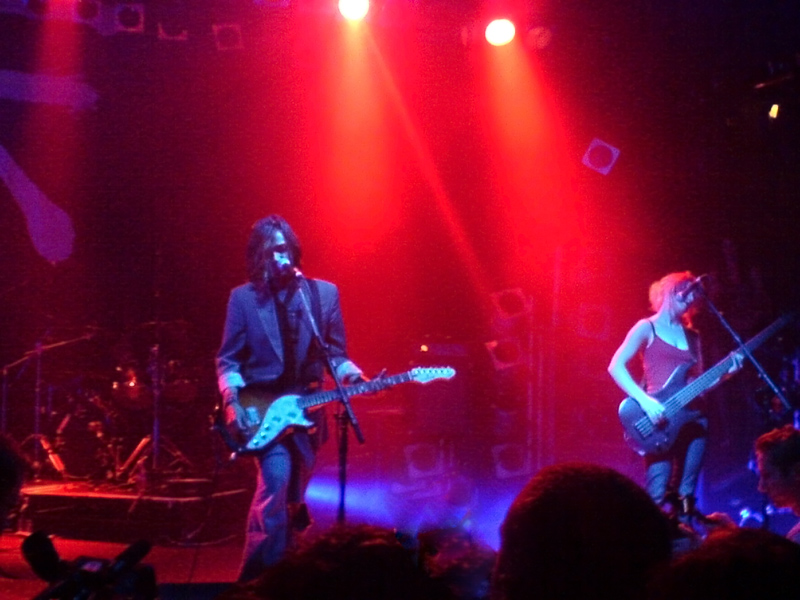
- My Vitriol live at KOKO, 24 November 2006

Background information
- Origin: London, England
- Genres: Alternative rock; nu gaze; alternative metal; shoegaze; noise rock
- Years active: 1998–2002, 2005–present
- Labels: Infectious; Warner; Play It Again Sam; Sony Music Japan; Epic
- Members: Som Wardner; Ravi Kesavaram; Seth Taylor
- Past members: Carolyn Bannister; Laura Salmon; Tatia Starkey
- Website: my-vitriol.com

My Vitriol are a British alternative rock band, formed in 1998 in London. The band currently comprises singer and guitarist Som Wardner, drummer Ravi Kesavaram, guitarist Seth Taylor and bassist Tatia Starkey. The band had success with their debut album Finelines in 2001, which spawned three top-40 hit singles on the UK Singles Chart, before announcing a hiatus in 2002. The band were credited as spearheading a new shoegazing movement, dubbed nu gaze. They released new material in 2007, and released limited fanbase album The Secret Sessions in October 2016. The band name is taken from the Graham Greene novel Brighton Rock.

== Biography ==
=== Formation ===
Ravi Kesavaram and Som Wardner, of Sri Lankan origin, met at UCL where they lived opposite each other in halls, with Wardner studying genetics and Kesavaram studying biochemistry. A year and a half later they began playing together, with Kesavaram playing drums and Wardner playing the rest of the instruments. They recorded an EP, "Delusions of Grandeur", in two days. BBC Radio 1 DJ Steve Lamacq received a copy at a gig and played the band on his Session Unsigned slot, which led to national exposure for the band and various press and record company interest.

The duo recruited former Mint 400 guitarist Seth Taylor and bassist Carolyn Bannister and released their debut single, "Always: Your Way" b/w "Pieces", on Org Records on 6 December 1999.

=== Finelines (2001) ===
The band's first single, "Losing Touch", was released in April 2000 on Infectious Records, peaking at number 91; the second "Cemented Shoes" reached number 65 in the UK Singles Chart in July. Their third single, "Pieces", charted at number 56 and the fourth, "Always: Your Way", broke the UK Top 40, peaking at number 31. Soon after the band’s debut album, Finelines, was released and it reached number 24 in the UK Albums Chart in March 2001. The final single from the album was their biggest hit, "Grounded", which peaked at number 29. The band toured extensively and played UK and international festivals in Europe and Japan.

The band had radio hits in South Africa and Iceland and signed to Epic in the US for a reported $400,000. The album was re-mixed by American producer Steve Thompson for release in the US. The new mix of the album was released in the UK in July 2002 as part of a 2 CD re-issue featuring b-sides and rarities, titled "Finelines/Between The Lines". The re-issue stumbled to number 96 in the charts. "Finelines/Between The Lines" was preceded by the "Moodswings" b/w "The Gentle Art Of Choking" double a-side, which was the band's final Top 40 single.

=== Hiatus (2002–2005) ===
In October 2002, after three years of touring, Wardner announced My Vitriol's hiatus at Kerrang Weekender. Their song "Always Your Way" was voted in 2002 as one of the best alternative songs by Xfm listeners. The band recorded a cover of Elliott Smith's "Bottle Up & Explode!", upon hearing of the singer-songwriter's death in October 2003. It was reported in December 2003 that the band were recording with Colin Richardson, with a view to a 2004 release. In May 2004, Gigwise confirmed that the second album was due for release in 2004 and revealed track titles "War of the Worlds", "My Whole World Implodes" and "Between Mercury and Mars".

=== Post-hiatus (2005–present) ===
In January 2005, the band played a low key show at O2 Academy Islington, London. The band debuted new material and a live album of the show (titled Cast In Amber) was released.

Bassist Carolyn Bannister departed sometime following the show in 2005 and was replaced by Laura Salmon, formerly of the heavy metal band Area 54. The new lineup of the band played KOKO in Camden, London in November 2006.

In March 2007, the band released the limited edition single "This Time" under the pseudonym of 'A Secret Society' via Org Records. The single was followed in July 2007 by "A Pyrrhic Victory EP", released via Xtra Mile Records. The band played several festivals in the UK, including Download, Guilfest and a headlining slot at Offset Festival the following year. The band continued to play live through 2008 and 2009, taking in two UK tours and shows in Europe and Japan. The band played at the final gig to be held at the London Astoria on 14 January 2009.

In May 2013, the band played their first show in nearly four years at KOKO in London. When guitarist Seth Taylor temporarily left the band due to family commitments, Sam Harvey was recruited for the role. Seth Taylor rejoined the band in September 2013, while Salmon was replaced by Tatia Starkey, granddaughter of the Beatles' drummer Ringo Starr.

A PledgeMusic campaign to fund a new album was announced on 5 July 2013, with a proposed release for 2014. It was later clarified on 29 May 2014 that the campaign would fund a limited release fanbase-only album entitled The Secret Sessions. On 26 October 2016, a critical article titled Whatever Happened To My Vitriol? appeared on Drowned In Sound documenting the multiple delays in the follow-up to their debut album Finelines. Two days later, the album was released as part of the limited release for PledgeMusic subscribers. The album was later made available on other streaming services on 7 September 2017. The band embarked on a short UK tour in April/May 2017, though several of the dates were postponed due to illness.

In 2020, The Secret Sessions was made available on Bandcamp.

== Discography ==
=== Studio albums ===
Title	Details	Peak chart positions			
Title	Details	UK	UK Indie	UK Rock	SCO
Finelines	Released: 5 March 2001; Label: Infectious; Formats: CD, LP	24	2	2	23
The Secret Sessions	Released: 28 October 2016; Label: PledgeMusic; Formats: CD	—	—	—	—

=== Live albums ===
- Cast in Amber (2006, My Vitriol)

=== Extended plays ===
Title	EP details
Delusions of Grandeur	Released: 1998; Label: n/a; Formats: CD
A Pyrrhic Victory	Released: 2007; Label: Xtra Mile Recordings (XMREP120); Formats: CD
War of the Worlds	Released: 2007; Label: Xtra Mile Recordings; Formats: CD

=== Singles ===
Title	Year	Peak chart positions			Album
Title	Year	UK	UK Indie	SCO	Album
"Always/Pieces"	1999	—	—	—	Finelines
"Losing Touch"	2000	91	15	—	Finelines
"Cemented Shoes"	2000	65	12	68	Finelines
"Pieces"	2001	56	11	54	Finelines
"Always: Your Way"	2001	31	3	33	Finelines
"Grounded"	2001	29	3	40	Finelines
"Moodswings/The Gentle Art of Choking"	2002	39	5	39	Finelines

== See also ==
- List of UCL alumni
