= Rosalita (band) =

Post-punk revival band from Ipswich, England

- Origin: Ipswich, England
- Genres: Indie rock, post-punk revival, new wave
- Years active: 2005–2009
- Past members: Kris Andrew; Richard Tyler; Jay Goodrich; Ben Groom; John Randall
- Website: www.rosalita.co.uk

Rosalita were a five-piece English post-punk revival band from East Anglia. The band formed in May 2005, and have toured continuously since early 2006. Rosalita play jerky indie pop "with the aim of making people dance". Their songs include pop culture references to things as diverse as Art Attack and Pop-Tarts. The band cite Talking Heads, The Stranglers, The Jam and Devo as influences. They have played as supporting act to Towers of London, Jack Peñate, Air Traffic and The Sounds among others.

At the end of 2006, Rosalita won the Archant newspaper group's "Next Big Thing" competition. As part of the prize the band were given the opportunity to support Bruce Foxton and Rick Buckler of The Jam at the Waterfront in Norwich on 23 May 2007.

In mid-2007 Rosalita took part in the "Road to V" competition to open V2007. As part of the finals of the competition they subsequently played at Carling Academy Islington on 16 May 2007, filmed by Channel 4. They went on to win the competition alongside Grimsby band The Brightlights. Rosalita's performance at V2007 was followed immediately by a surprise early set from the Foo Fighters.

Rosalita's debut single "Manga Girl" was released on 26 November 2007, on the NRONE Records label.

March 2008 saw the band embark on their first UK tour in support of the release of their new EP What Would Your Mother Say? (released on Taste Media). They also recorded a BBC Maida Vale session for BBC Introducing that was subsequently aired on Huw Stephens' Radio 1 show.

July 2009 saw the departure of lead singer Kris Andrew, which led to the disbandment of Rosalita.

September 2009 marked the debut performances of Kris Andrew's new band Jackknife Horsebox; former Rosalita guitar player Richard Tyler joined the fold immediately after the breakup of their old band. John Randell and Jay Goodrich joined with some old friends to form new collective The B.Goodes. Ben Groom has embarked upon a solo career under the pseudonym Benjamin Bloom. Since 2012, Jay Goodrich has played bass for Benjamin Bloom. All three acts show a significant departure in sound and genre when compared to Rosalita.

== Band members ==
- Kris Andrew - Vocals
- Jay Goodrich - Bass
- Ben Groom - Keyboards
- John Randall - Drums
- Richard Tyler - Guitar
