= Lewis Bryden =

American painter (born 1944)

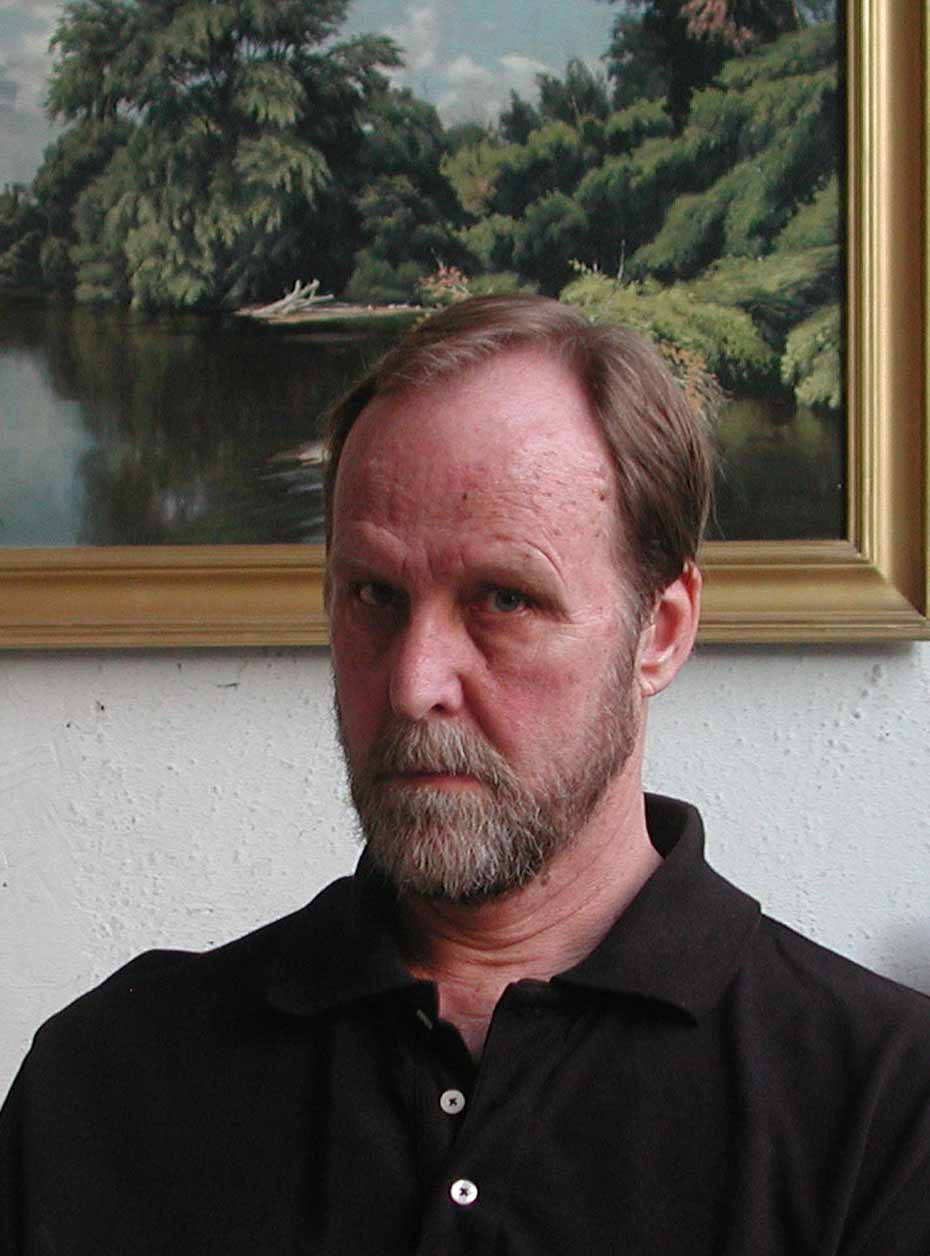
- Born: 1944 (age 81–82)
- Education: Yale University; Harvard University
- Occupation: Painter
- Spouse: Elizabeth
- Children: Nell Bryden

Lewis Bryden (born 1944) is an artist known for naturalistic landscapes – mainly of the Connecticut River valley. He also paints genre scenes and makes realism sculptures. Bryden's plein air paintings include Mexico, Cuba, Alaska, Russia, New York City and the American West. He has exhibited since 1973 at over 20 solo exhibitions and many group shows. Formally trained as an architect, Bryden is self-taught in the fine arts. His style is informed by his interest in rendering different kinds of light. Curator Martha Hoppin describes Bryden's method: “He paints the light in space, and then fills the space with nature.”

Bryden lives in New York City with his wife Elizabeth. His daughter, Nell Bryden, is a singer performing around the UK and Ireland. Bryden maintains studios in New York City and Hadley, Massachusetts. In Hadley, he paints in his home or on a houseboat on the Connecticut River.

== Background ==
From an early age, Bryden knew he wanted to be an artist. When he was nine years old, he won second place in a statewide children's art competition. That same year he sold a watercolor out of a children's exhibit at the Norton Museum of Fine Art in West Palm Beach, Florida. “That sealed it for me,” Bryden remembers. He graduated from Yale (B.A.1966) and from Graduate School of Design at Harvard (M.A. 1970). While making a living as an architectural renderer, Bryden continued to develop his technique as an artist by going to the Metropolitan Museum of Art in New York City where he spent hours copying masterpieces.

“The best place to study the art that interested me was in the museum… I set my easel up in front of one masterpiece after another, copying from Velasquez, Vermeer, Caravaggio, Titian, Hals, and of course Rembrandt. I also copied Renoir, Monet, and Pissarro among the Impressionists. It was here, that I began to see the common thread of art that moved me, and why contemporary art had failed to do so. The subjects of these paintings were people from across the ages who were also like us, and they were captured in believable human moments.”

It wasn't until 1988, when Bryden moved to Massachusetts, that his dream of supporting himself as a professional artist became a reality. He continued to do architectural work but began selling more canvases as area art buyers discovered his paintings of local landscapes. “It’s a beautiful spot and people like to see things they know. That allowed me for the first time to sell enough to live on.”

== Landscapes ==
Bryden paints three basic types of landscapes: panoramic views, waterscapes and architecture in landscape.

Bryden's best-known works are his panoramic views, usually from Mt. Holyoke in Hadley, Mass. In this work, he focuses on nature as a paradox. Bryden says, “Nature up close is wild and brutal, but from a distance it is serene and ordered.” In all of his landscapes he emphasizes nature over man. Carl Little in Paintings of New England says “In his landscapes of the Pioneer Valley of Massachusetts Lewis Bryden has been known to edit out all the accumulated debris of modern life, including cars, telephone poles, and road signs.”

A second focus is waterscapes. Bryden paints scenes of mountain vistas and the shoreline of the Connecticut River from the water's surface. Bryden's "river studio," a houseboat he bought as a place to paint, allows him to maximize his time working in nature and provides a unique viewpoint.

A third category is architecture in landscape. Bryden's background as an architect comes through in these works, but his depictions have a rich style that uses the light, irregular edges, and the texture of the paint to portray the building's character, rather than a strict draftsman-style representation of the form.

Most of Bryden's painting is done outdoors, which presents the obstacles of varied weather conditions and rapidly changing light. In Hadley, Mass. he paints from his 26-foot pontoon boat called "Float des Artistes."

“Usually the studio is where you go back to after you find a spot you like. This way I can take the studio to the spot I like.” Many artists work from a bridge or on the bank. Bryden has always preferred to be in the river. “This allows me to be right in the middle of the water, and allows me to see things in a different way.” When he received a commission from the MD Anderson Cancer Center in Houston for a 47x54-inch painting on the river, he knew he needed to come up with a unique solution. He purchased a houseboat from the owner of the Food Bank Farm in Hadley. After a few upgrades, including replacing the 15-horsepower motor with a 50-horsepower engine and adding some new flooring he was ready to go. “I turned the houseboat into a floating studio.”

Since the light on the river is so variable, he has to work quickly. “In about two hours, the light has changed so much that I really can’t continue any more. I have to start a new painting and wait until the same time of day for the light to come back.” He has developed several methods to overcome the time pressure. He takes 15 minutes to mix his colors and then another 15 to sketch the scene on canvas. He'll spend two or three hours on the river, take a break, and then return in the afternoon.

Another method he uses is to make a pencil sketch from memory of a view that interests him. Later he'll revisit the site to add details. He'll then transfer the drawings to canvas and sketch the composition in sepia paint. Once this is ready, he takes the large canvas outside at the same time of day and in the same light conditions as in his memory, and he captures the colors. Over the summer, Bryden will begin 30-50 paintings. He later finishes his paintings, with the help of his sketches to remind him of the colors, in either his Hadley or Manhattan studio.

=== Vision ===
In an article on Bryden, Martha Hoppin speaks highly of his sensitivity:

"Bryden is a poet. He constructs studies of light and air and space. ‘I am not painting a landscape,’ he says, ‘I am painting a painting.’ Despite the artist's emphasis on the act of painting, he cares deeply about his subject matter. He communicates his own joy at being outside in nature and his sense that the world is a satisfying place to live. He depicts nature's beauty in its serene and comfortable moments. The human element in relation to the landscape does not interest him. He does not seek drama, and he does not strive for ‘higher’ meaning through the use of symbolic motifs. His works are most remarkable for their feeling of harmony and serenity, and above all, for their unaffected naturalness."

== Painting locations ==
=== Havana (2002) ===
In 2002, the US Treasury Department sanctioned Bryden's visit to Cuba on an artistic mission. He spent five days there and completed a series of "plein air" paintings.

I had permission from the Treasury Department to go to Cuba on a kind of cultural exchange, and I intended to use the time to do as many "plein air" paintings as I could, even though I only had five days. My impressions were quick and sketchy; it is hard to say how much they might have changed with more time spent there. Although I do not know a lot about Cuba, it has always formed a part of my imagination. My youth spent in Florida was filled with stories told by people who had visited it as tourists before the Revolution and by refugees after the Revolution who remembered it as their lost homeland. I always had a very vivid image of the island in my mind. My short visit there both confirmed and contradicted that vision. Now, in my mind there are two Cubas—the Cuba imagined or remembered from stories, versus the Cuba seen and experienced. The tension between the two, finally, forms a theme for this series of paintings.

=== Colorado ===
Bryden has taken several painting trips to Colorado and the neighboring states of New Mexico and Arizona. He enjoys the spectacular scenery in the mountains and the dramatic seasons.

=== Glacier Bay Basin. Alaska ===
For an artist who pursues light, Alaska is a natural setting. Bryden has gone to Glacier Bay, Alaska to capture the unusual lighting conditions there. In the Alaskan summer, painting could be done in natural light from very early morning to nearly the middle of the night.

=== Coney Island ===
Bryden has painted a series he calls ‘’Boardwalk Idyll’’ that spans over 30 years of work. The series, which explores the eternal summer of adolescence, was exhibited at the Brooklyn Public Library in 2004 and later at the R. Michelson Galleries in Northampton, Massachusetts. In a talk about this series, he states “Other artists before me have used Coney Island, each in his own way. I started studying the work of Reginald Marsh, David Levine, and the photographer Bruce Davidson. My own particular inspiration was a fascination with people in public places who are acting out their private dramas.”

One collector of Bryden's work, Michael Mao, has four of the series’ near life-size paintings displayed in one small room, creating the illusion of having walked into a cocktail party where people have already gathered. “The figures are friendly, not intimidating, so they are a welcome addition to our home,” said Mao. “When Lewis borrows them for an exhibition it is as if some of the family has gone missing.”

Bryden's method for these pieces was inspired by the “crust of paint” on impressionist Claude Monet’s work “Water Lilies.” Bryden developed his own textured sculptural-style technique to create the surface texture for his Boardwalk paintings. To “mimic the atmospheric conditions of a hot summer day,” Bryden mixes Neo Megilp with 50% stand oil to coat his canvas. He then adds pigment and varnish, “as much as the canvas will take.”

Each painting portrays a moment of interaction or isolation on the boardwalk. Bryden describes them, “They’re [moments] of tranquility, waiting for something to happen.” They tell a story. “Each of one these is a stand-alone story, even though I have no idea what the story is.” He captures people's interactions, “I wanted them to react to each other. He goes after the tension that is built when they “recognize that the other person exists.”

With the bustle of the Boardwalk, Bryden relies on sketches and photographs as well as sessions with live models for his pieces. A few paintings were inspired by a box of Kodachrome slides he found of a couple. The slides captured scenes similar to the ones he had been painting. As there was no way to identify the owners to return the slides, he used the images as an inspiration for several pieces.

=== Mexico and American Southwest ===
Bryden began visiting Mexico annually in 1993. During his visits, he does informal portraits and sketches in the public squares capturing plein air impressions of the moment. In 1994, he put his work together into a series, “Tierra Insolita” which was formally presented in the exhibition at the Galleria Ixcateopan in Acapulco in that same year.

Acapulco is his home base during these visits, but he takes trips with friends to remote, mountainous areas of Guerrero. During one of these trips, he decided to do a series on the average, everyday person living in Mexico.

Writer Stephen Lockwood describes these paintings: “Every picture in the series is very direct, there is little for the eye to focus on, other than the facial characteristic of the subject. The directional gaze of each sitter is varied: some look directly at the viewer, others look off to the left or to the right. The different position of each head has the effect of changing how engaged or disengaged each portrait is with the observer.”

== Art projects ==
=== Portraits ===
While Bryden has done many portraits, he does not consider himself a portrait artist and has never taken a commission for a portrait. He usually paints friends and family and occasional professional models. He has done a few self-portraits, but they have rarely been exhibited.

Bryden is very interested in the relationships and stories of people he paints. He is attracted to stories of artists and the relationships they have with the muses that inspire them.

=== Sculpture ===
As with the rest of his art, Bryden's sculpting technique is mainly self-taught. He has recently been doing more sculpture, having entered this mode after he learned one of his models was allergic to turpentine. His time with the model was limited and he wanted to capture her features, so he turned to the medium of clay. He later learned the process of bronze sculpture and stone carving. His most recent commission, Nature as Muse, is a life-size bronze in the Mallinckrodt Garden at the art center called View in Old Forge, NY.

== Gallery ==
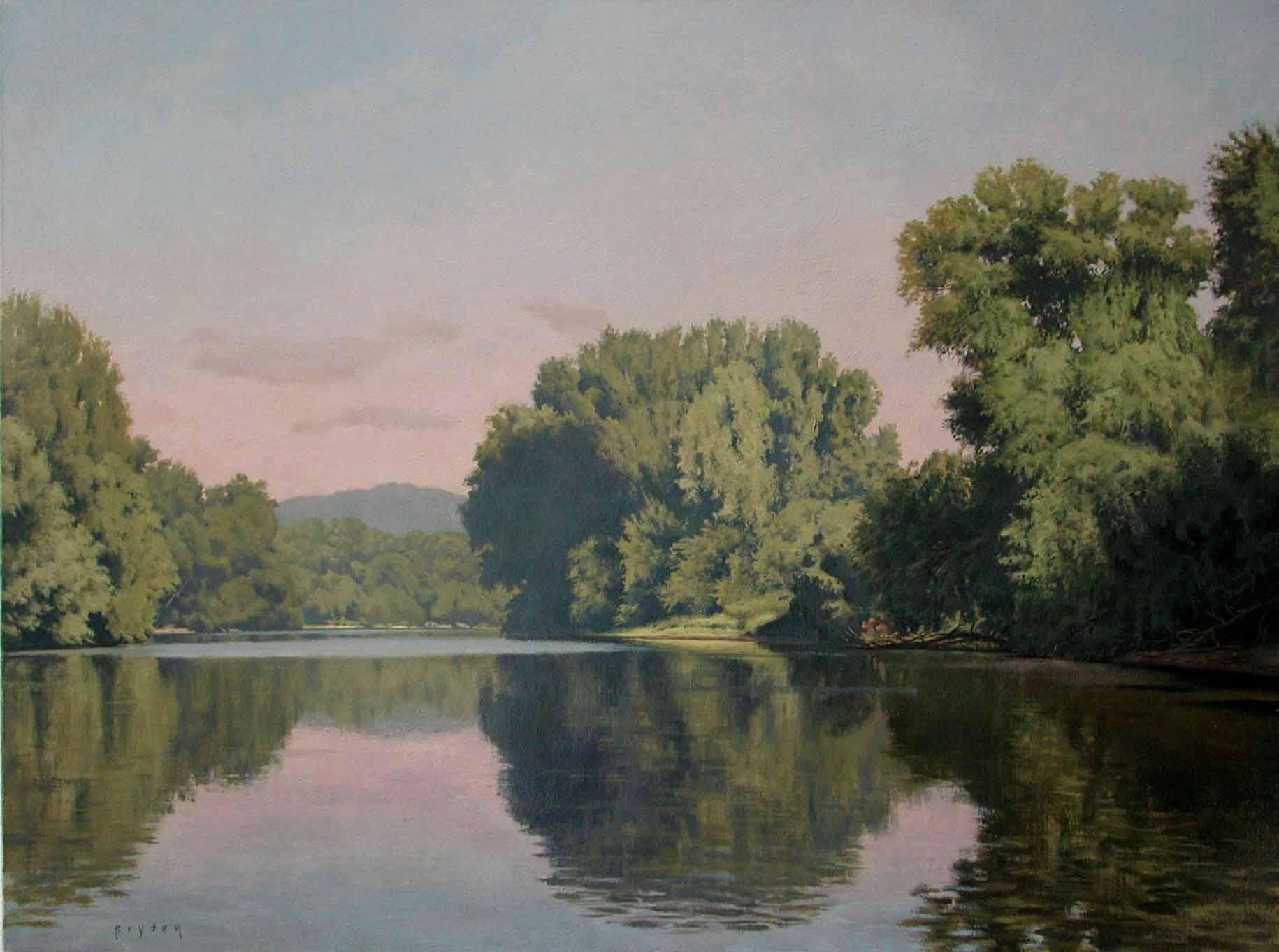
Lewis Bryden painted Beginning of Day in 2001. It was acquired by The Michele and Donald D'Amour Museum of Fine Arts, Springfield, MA in 2009

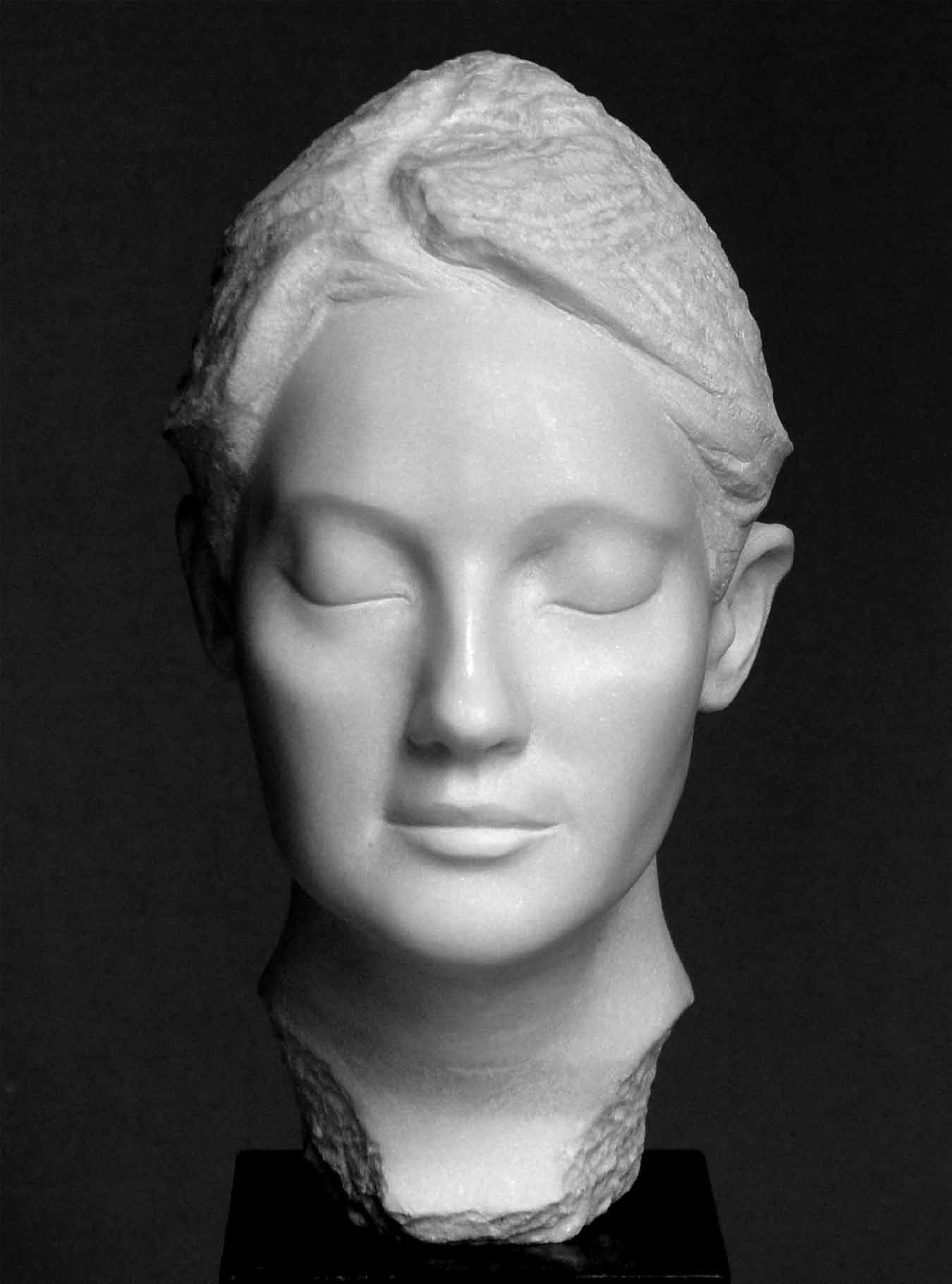
Dream in Stone is a 13 inch high bust.

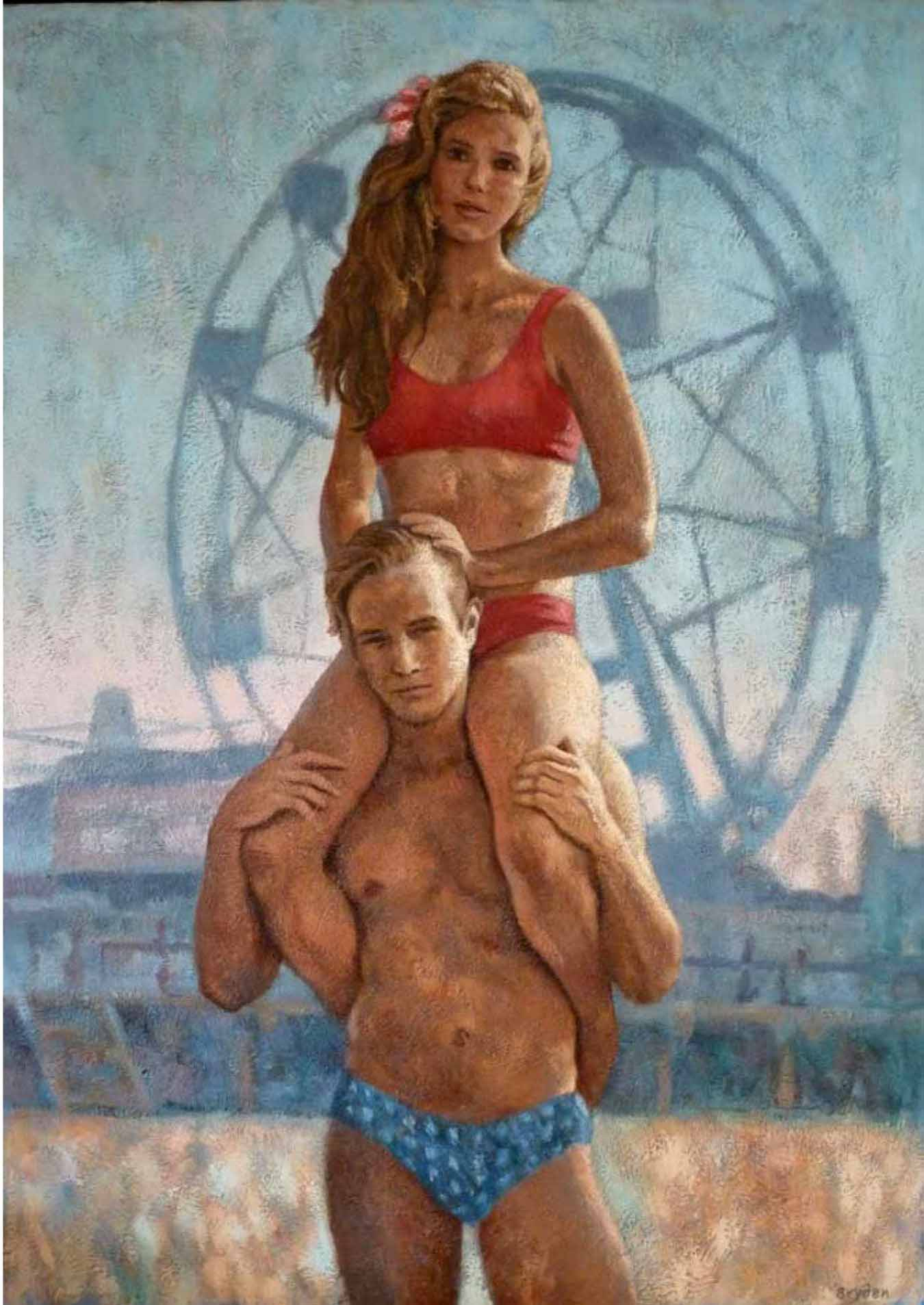
Lewis Bryden painted Ferris Wheel in 1989. It is a 60x40 oil on canvas in the Collection of Michael Mao, New York, NY.

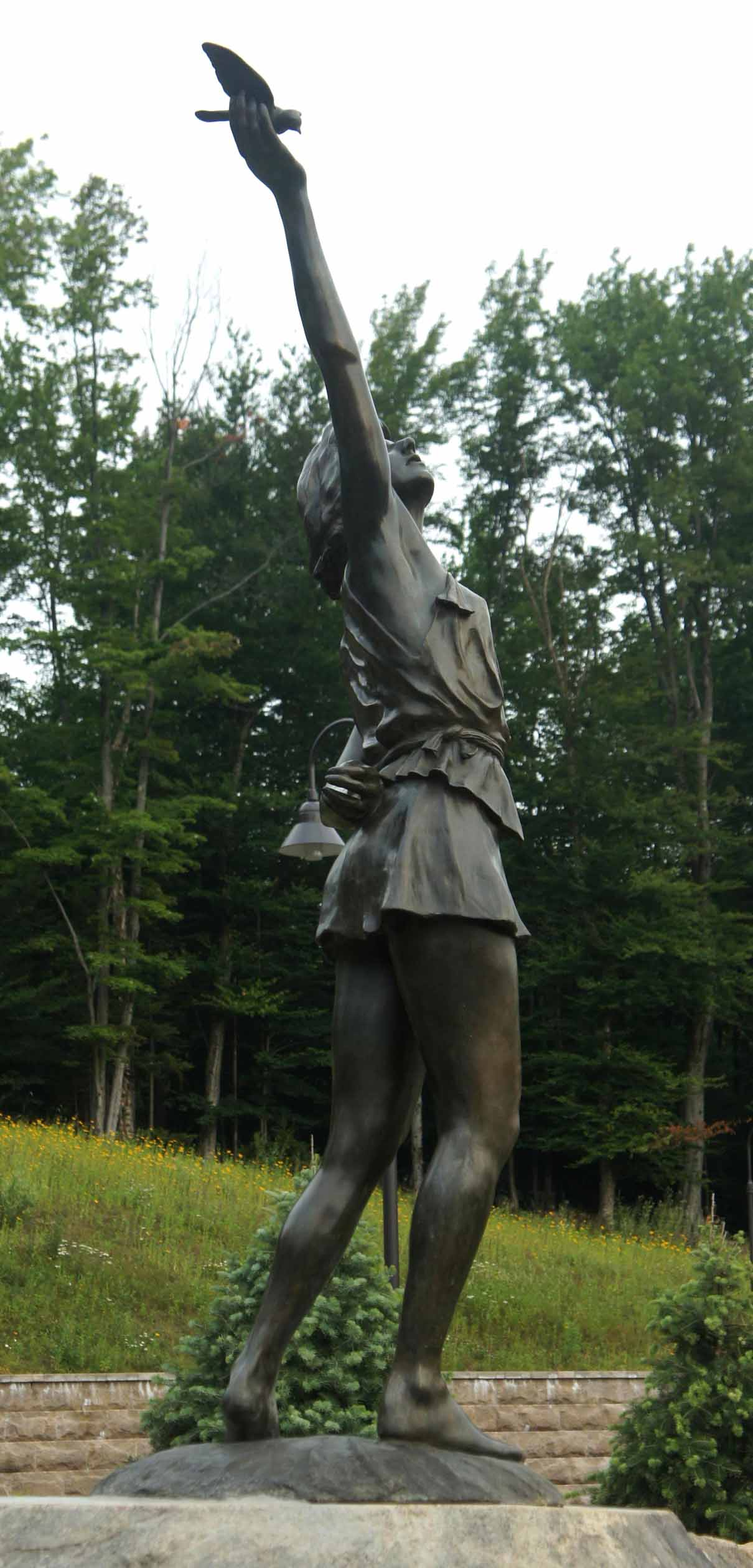
Nature as Muse is a life-size bronze in the Mallinckrodt Garden at the art center called View in Old Forge, NY.

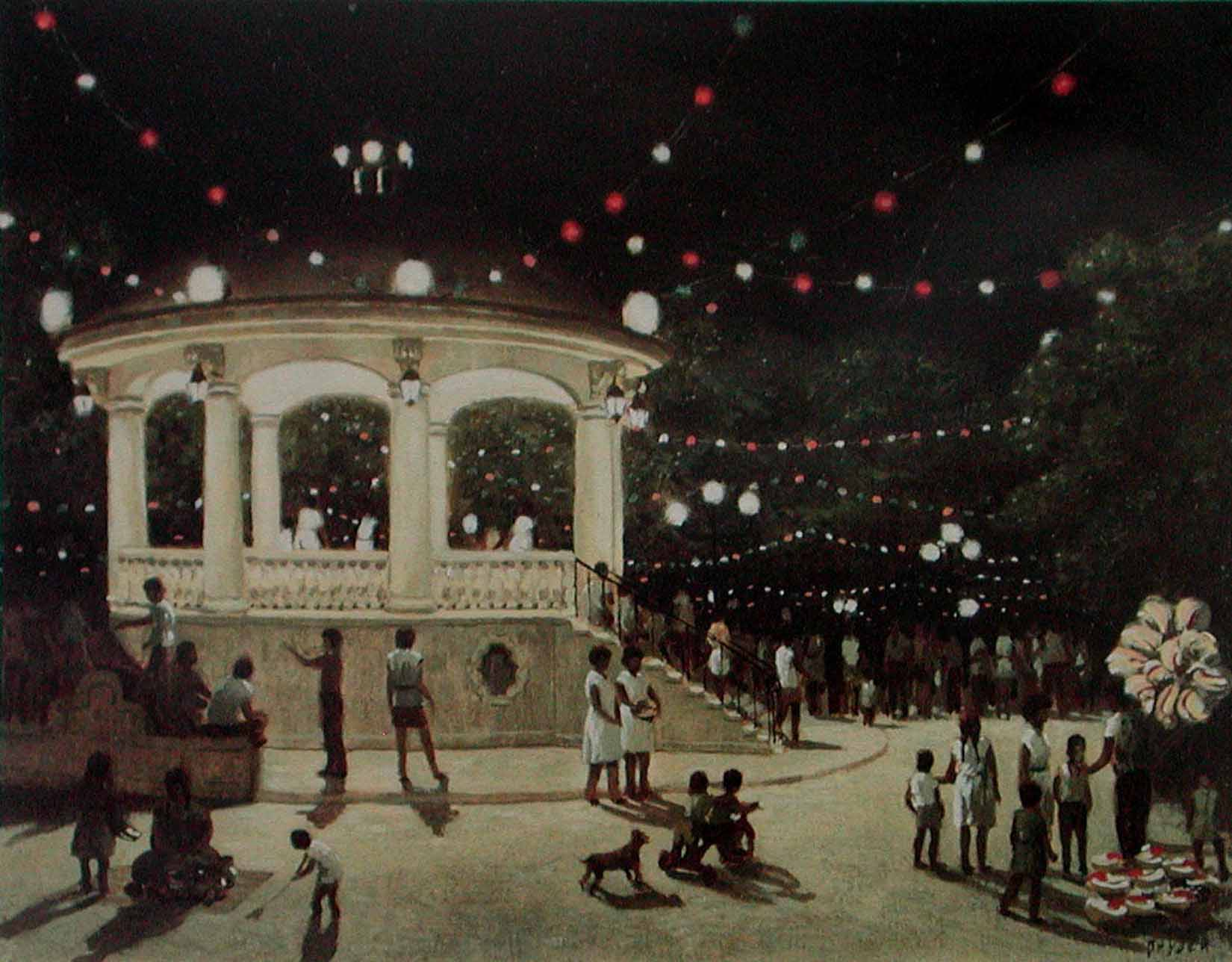
Lewis Bryden painted Zocalo in 1993 and it is part of the Collection of Universidad Americana, Acapulco, Mexico. Zocalo means town square—it is common in Mexican cities, villages and towns.

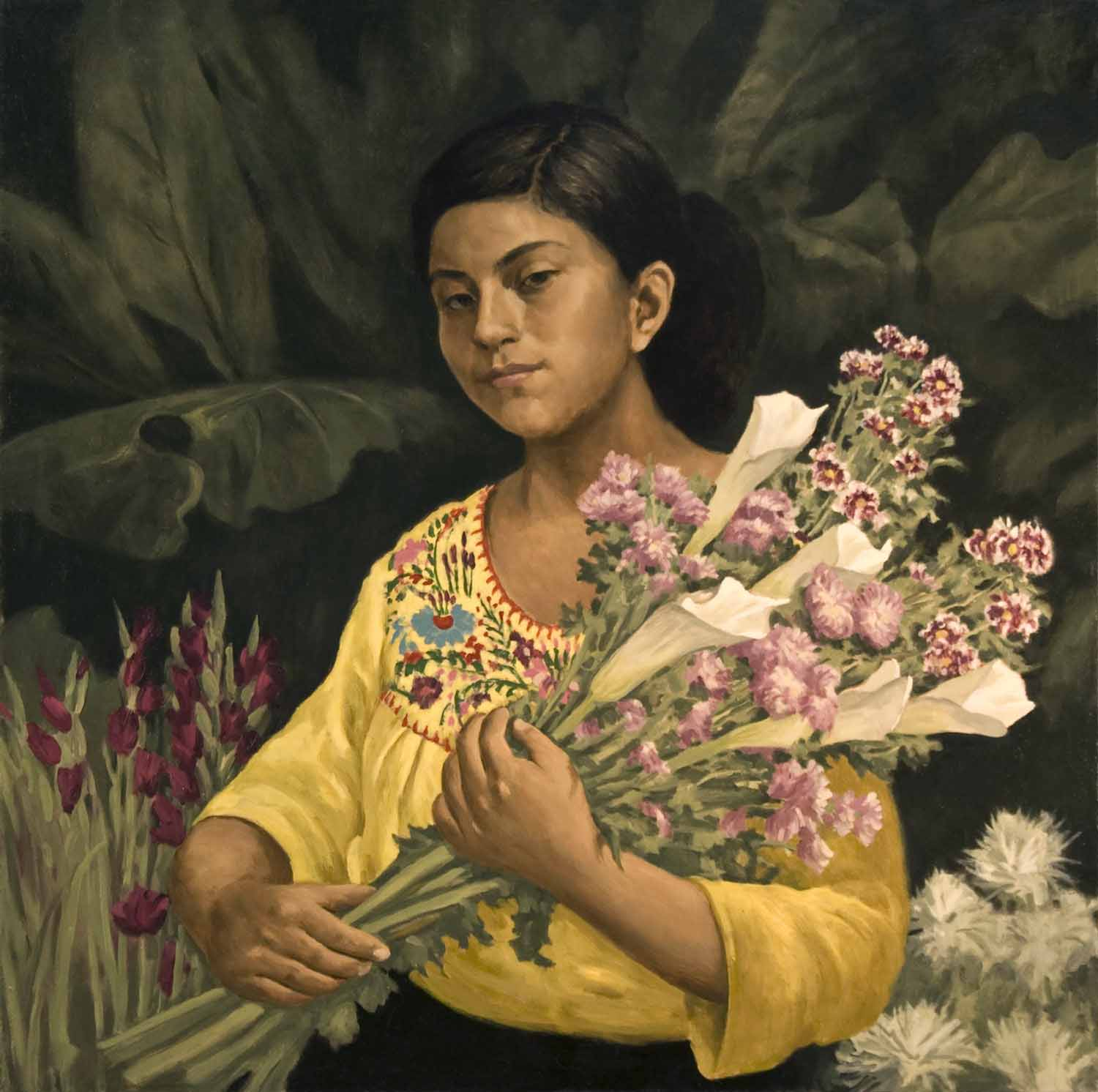
Lewis Bryden painted Rocio in 2007 as a commission for the Chicago Hospital for Women and Children. It is an oil on canvas and is part of the Rostros de Mexico series.

== Exhibitions ==
- R. Michelson Gallery, Northampton, Massachusetts.
- Casa Frela Gallery, New York City.
- Vail International Gallery, Vail, Colorado
- Metropolitan Gallery, Austin, Texas

== Commissions ==
- Nature as a Muse – Mallinckrodt Garden
- Streams of Living Water – MD Anderson Cancer Center
- Rocio – Chicago Hospital for Women and Children

== Awards and collections ==
Beginning early in his career, Bryden received numerous awards, such as the Silvermine Guild Award, first prize 1985 (Carolyn Lanchner, juror) and Mid Hudson Arts Competition 1985, second prize (Barbara Haskell, juror). In 2009 the Springfield Art Museums acquired two Bryden landscapes — "The Beginning of the Day" and "The End of The Day."
