= Nell Bryden =

American singer-songwriter (born 1977)

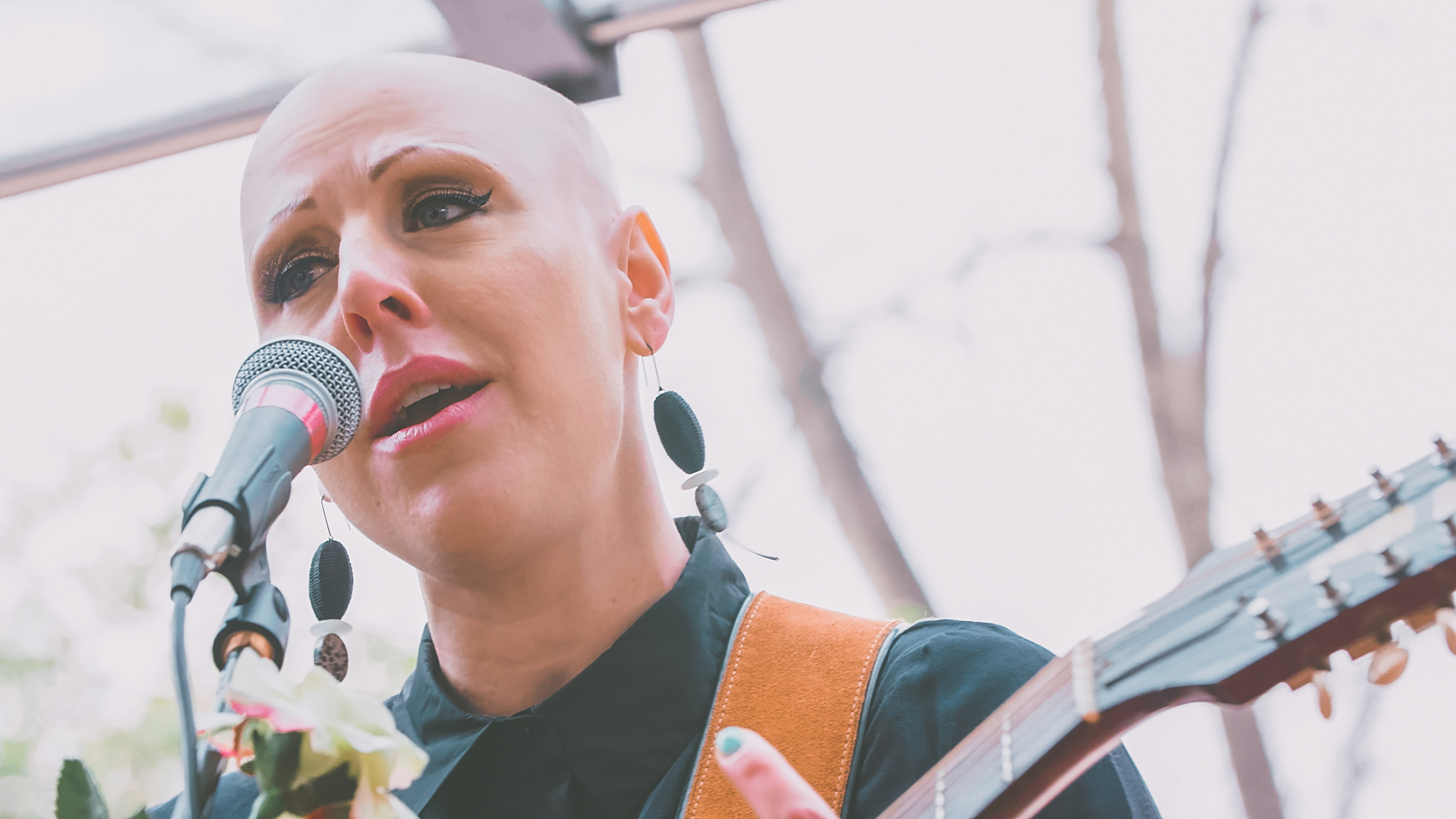
- Bryden performing in 2019
- Born: March 8, 1977 (age 49); Brooklyn, New York, US
- Occupations: Musician; author
- Years active: 2000–present
- Parent: Lewis Bryden (father)
- Musical career
- Instruments: Vocals; guitar
- Website: nellbryden.com

Nell Bryden (born March 8, 1977) is an American singer-songwriter.

== Early life ==
Bryden was born in Brooklyn, New York, to artistic parents. Her father is the painter and sculptor Lewis Bryden, and her mother is a classically trained soprano. It was during this time that she began performing her songs live in the Boston folk and rock clubs.

== Career ==
In 2002, Bryden recorded the album Day for Night in Nashville with producer Fred Mollin and toured the US to promote it. In 2005, she began working on her second record with producer John Hill, though the sessions were aborted when she ran out of money. After auctioning a Milton Avery painting she received from her father, she was able to use the proceeds to rerecord her album, this time with producer David Kershenbaum. The result was What Does It Take, which came out in October 2009.

Her next album, Shake the Tree, was issued in 2012. Following the release of the single "Sirens", Bryden was approached by Take That lead singer Gary Barlow, who asked her to join him as the support act for his UK tour from November to January 2013. During these months, Bryden also supported Jools Holland for several of his UK dates, including at the Royal Albert Hall.

Bryden published the double album Wayfarer in July 2014. It included the Christmas-themed song "May You Never Be Alone", which was later covered by Susan Boyle and released on her 2016 album, A Wonderful World.

In 2016, Bryden worked with producer Andy Wright to record Bloom, her fifth studio album. In 2019, she issued the EP Soundtrack to Little Wing – Part 1 and followed it with the compilation Living Room Sessions. That year, Bryden became a British citizen.

In 2020, she released a compilation titled The Collection. That year, she was the first artist to collaborate remotely with the BBC Concert Orchestra for a House Music Session on Ken Bruce's Radio 2 show; it was broadcast in March, during the COVID-19 lockdown.

== Radio presenting ==
Bryden presented her first radio show, an hour-long dedication to the New York music scene, on BBC Radio 2, in August 2014. It featured some of the artists who had inspired her as a songwriter.

In January 2016, she curated and presented a four-part miniseries, called Nell's Angels, Series 1, again on BBC Radio 2, featuring some of her favorite female artists.. Nell's Angels, Series 2 came out in August of the same year.

In 2017, Bryden presented another four-part mini-series on BBC Radio 2, called Nell's Kitchen, this one an historical exploration of New York City's music scenes.

== Discography ==
=== Studio albums ===
| Album title | Album details |
|---|---|
| Day for Night | Released: August 19, 2003; Label: 157 Records; Format: CD, download |
| What Does It Take | Released: October 12, 2009; Label: Cooking Vinyl; Format: CD, download |
| Shake the Tree | Released: June 18, 2012; Label: Warner, ADA, 157 Records; Format: CD, download |
| Wayfarer | Released: July 28, 2014; Label: Absolute, 157 Records; Format: CD, download |
| Bloom | Released: January 27, 2017; Label: 157 Records; Format: CD, download |
| The Collection | Released: September 4, 2020; Label: 157 Records; Format: CD, download |
| Arms Around the Flame | Released: February 7, 2022; Label: 157 Records; Format: Download |
| I Love You So Much I'm Blind | Released: November 1, 2024; Label: 157 Records; Format: Download |

=== EPs ===
| Album title | Album details |
|---|---|
| Soundtrack to Little Wing – Part 1 | Released: March 8, 2019; Label: Nell Bryden Ltd. |
| Believe Again | Released: December 1, 2023; Label: 157 Records; Format: Download |

=== Live albums ===
| Album title | Album details |
|---|---|
| Live from Iraq | Released: February 7, 2009; Label: 157 Records; Format: CD |
| Live in London | Released: October 25, 2013; Label:157 Records; Format: CD, download |
| Live the Wayfarer Way | Released: December 2015; Label:157 Records; Format: CD, download |
| Living Room Sessions | Released: May 21, 2019; Label:157 Records; Format: CD, download |

=== Singles ===
| Year | Single | Album |
|---|---|---|
| 2009 | "What Does It Take" | What Does It Take |
| 2009 | "Second Time Around" | What Does It Take |
| 2010 | "Not Like Loving You" | What Does It Take |
| 2010 | "Tonight" | What Does It Take |
| 2010 | "Goodbye" | What Does It Take |
| 2011 | "Glory to the Day" | What Does It Take |
| 2012 | "Buildings and Treetops" | Shake the Tree |
| 2012 | "Sirens" | Shake the Tree |
| 2013 | "Shake the Tree" | Shake the Tree |
| 2013 | "Echoes" | Shake the Tree |
| 2013 | "All You Had" | Wayfarer |
| 2014 | "Wayfarer" | Wayfarer |
| 2014 | "May You Never Be Alone" | non-album single |
| 2015 | "Waves" | Wayfarer |
| 2015 | "Wolves" | Wayfarer |
| 2016 | "What Is It You Want" | Bloom |
| 2017 | "Thought I Was Meant for You" | Bloom |
| 2017 | "Dared the World and Won" | Bloom |
| 2017 | "Praying for Time" | non-album single |
| 2019 | "Smoke in My Heart" | Soundtrack to Little Wing – Part 1 |
| 2020 | "Amy" | The Collection |
| 2020 | "These Changes" | The Collection |
| 2021 | "Dancing in Chains" | Arms Around the Flame |
| 2021 | "Gaslight" | Arms Around the Flame |
| 2021 | "Feels Like Rain" | Arms Around the Flame |
| 2022 | "I Am the Storm" | Arms Around the Flame |
| 2022 | "Diamonds and Gold Dust" | Arms Around the Flame |
| 2022 | "Call It What It Is" (feat. Thea Gilmore) | Arms Around the Flame |
| 2023 | "Hail Mary" | Believe Again |
| 2024 | "Cassandra" | I Love You So Much I'm Blind |
