= Pacifica (band) =

Argentine indie rock duo

- Inés Adam and Martina Nintzel performing in Buenos Aires, Argentina, in April 2025

Background information
- Origin: Buenos Aires, Argentina
- Genres: Indie rock; garage rock; post-punk; indie pop
- Years active: 2021–present
- Labels: TAG; The Orchard
- Members: Inés Adam; Martina Nintzel
- Website: pacificaband.app

Pacifica is an Argentine indie rock duo formed in Buenos Aires in early 2021 by Inés Adam (guitar, vocals) and Martina Nintzel (bass, vocals). The project first gained attention for cover versions posted on social media before moving on to original material.

== History ==
=== Formation (2021) ===
Adam and Nintzel met on social media in early 2021, drawn together by a shared interest in the Strokes: Nintzel ran an Instagram fan account devoted to the band, and Adam had been posting her own covers to YouTube since 2013. A mutual follower suggested they get in touch after noticing they were both Argentine. After finding out they lived close to each other in Buenos Aires, they recorded a cover of "12:51" by the Strokes, which drew an immediate response on social media and which was, according to Nintzel, her first musical collaboration with someone else. The duo also recorded covers of songs by Fleetwood Mac, Arctic Monkeys, the Beatles, Alanis Morissette, Talking Heads, Charly García, and Los Abuelos de la Nada, among others.

Late in 2021, Arctic Monkeys tribute act Monopolio invited them to open for them, prompting them to choose a name for the project before the show; the name comes from a Yamaha Pacifica electric guitar owned by Adam. That performance was their live debut, at which they were introduced as "the Strokes girls", a nickname that pushed them to write original material.

=== Not a Cover Band and early steps (2022) ===
In January 2022, at Nintzel's urging, the duo travelled to New York to attend a Strokes concert, funded through a Buy Me a Coffee campaign and with lodging at the apartment of a cousin of Adam's. The concert was cancelled due to a storm; they got a slot at the Bitter End instead, and on 29 January 2022 they performed at Arlene's Grocery. Those performances led to their signing by TAG Music, a joint venture between musician Gabe Saporta (formerly of Cobra Starship) and Atlantic Records, which was already following the duo and sent a representative to one of the shows.

In December 2022 they released their debut EP, Not a Cover Band, made up of covers of Arctic Monkeys, Wet Leg, Los Abuelos de la Nada, and the Strokes.

=== Freak Scene (2023) ===
Through TAG Music, the duo released a series of singles ahead of their debut album: "With or Without You" (April 2023); "Anita", produced by Nicolás De Sanctis; "Premature Rejection" (August 2023); and "Change Your Mind".

Their debut studio album, Freak Scene, was released on 29 September 2023. The eleven-track record drew on 1990s and 2000s garage rock and indie pop, with critics citing acts such as Garbage and the Strokes as touchstones. Adam and Nintzel wrote the material first with guitar, bass, and a computer at Adam's home, later bringing in drums with producer Nicolás De Sanctis (of the band Indios).

On 15 October 2023 they presented Freak Scene at Niceto Club in Buenos Aires. On the 29th of that month they opened for Måneskin at the Movistar Arena in Buenos Aires, as part of the Italian band's Rush! World Tour, and in November they played Primavera Sound Buenos Aires. That December they undertook their first European tour, a six-date run backed live by guitarist Rodri and drummer Andy; shows sold out in Paris and Madrid, and the London venue had to expand capacity due to demand.

In March 2024 they played Lollapalooza Argentina, and on 18 May of that year they opened for Louis Tomlinson at Estadio Vélez Sarsfield in Buenos Aires, as part of his Faith in the Future World Tour. They also released Freak Scene: NAK Sessions, an EP of acoustic reworkings of songs from their debut, and continued touring cities across the Americas—including São Paulo, Toronto, New York, Los Angeles, and Mexico City—and Europe.

On 27 September 2024 they released the live EP Freak Scene (Live), recorded on the rooftop of the space where they rehearsed, featuring live versions of six songs from their debut album—"Closer", "With or Without You", "Premature Rejection", "Away", "Hotel Bar", and "Silent Affection"—plus a cover of "Take On Me" by A-ha. That November they opened for Franz Ferdinand, in April 2025 they played the Quilmes Rock festival, and the following month they opened shows co-headlined by St. Vincent and Kim Gordon.

=== In Your Face! (2025) ===
The duo's second studio album, In Your Face!, was released on 31 October 2025 through TAG Music/The Orchard, with thirteen tracks selected from a pool of 43 songs written during the writing process. The record was recorded partly in the United Kingdom and in Los Angeles—where they worked with producer Sean Silverman on tracks such as "Indie Boyz"—and completed in Argentina with sound engineer Javier Kalwill, who later moved with them to Spain to continue collaborating. Adam described the mixing process as "a drama with the label", the result of re-recording parts of the album to bring it closer to the rock sound they were after. Unlike Freak Scene, which the pair have described as leaning on more fictionalized scenarios, In Your Face! is more autobiographical and personal, with songs addressing breakups, independence, and their experience as young women in the music industry.

Ahead of the album they released the singles "What You Doing", "Fixer Upper", and "Soltame!"—their first original song in Spanish—along with an English-language version of the latter, "Just No Fun". On 30 November 2025 they played what was, at that point, the biggest headline show of their career at Teatro Vorterix in Buenos Aires, presenting In Your Face!. In December 2025 they made their debut in Japan with shows in Tokyo and Osaka, which sold out quickly and had to be expanded with additional dates. Toward the end of that year, Adam and Nintzel relocated to Madrid, Spain.

Between March and December 2026 the duo are touring 43 dates across 17 countries, closing with a show in Buenos Aires on 19 December.

In August 2026 it was announced that they, alongside Usted Señálemelo, would open for Foo Fighters at a show the American band will play on 25 February 2027 at Estadio Monumental in Buenos Aires, as part of their Take Cover Tour.

== Members ==
Pacifica consists solely of Adam and Nintzel, who make up the entirety of the project's creative and songwriting core. Live, they have been backed by supporting musicians, including guitarist Rodrigo Saravia and drummer Andyno Plex, an independent artist and producer who has been the band's most frequent live drummer; since Adam and Nintzel's move to Spain in late 2025, their touring drummer has been Coke Torres.

== Musical style ==
Music writers have placed Pacifica within indie rock and garage rock, with elements of post-punk, indie pop, and "indie sleaze". Stated influences include the Strokes, Arctic Monkeys, the Beatles, Radiohead, Charly García, Phoenix, the Virgins, and Daft Punk; the single "Indie Boyz" leans further into techno and dance-rock, drawing on singer Sombr. The duo have cited kinship with contemporary acts such as Dea Matrona, the Beaches, and Djo.

== Discography ==
=== Studio albums ===
- Freak Scene (2023)
- In Your Face! (2025)

=== EPs ===
- Not a Cover Band (2022)
- Freak Scene (Live) (2024)
- Freak Scene: NAK Sessions (2024)

=== Selected singles ===
- "With or Without You" (2023)
- "Anita" (2023)
- "Premature Rejection" (2023)
- "Change Your Mind" (2023)
- "What You Doing" (2025)
- "Fixer Upper" (2025)
- "Soltame!" (2025)
- "Just No Fun" (2025)
- "Indie Boyz" (2025)
