= Halo (British band) =

- Origin: Bristol, England
- Genres: Alternative rock
- Years active: 1999–2004, 2011–present
- Labels: Sony Music Entertainment
- Members: Graeme Moncrieff; Iain Moncrieff; Steve Yeomans; Jim Davey
- Past members: Blake Davies

Halo are a rock band from Bristol, England, who formed in 1999 and disbanded in 2004. In 2002, they released one album, and had three singles in the UK Singles Chart. They reformed in 2011 and are currently recording their second album.

== History ==
The band's journey began in 1999 when brothers Graeme and Iain Moncrieff joined forces with Jim Davey and then Stevie Yeomans. They developed a unique sound consisting of raw energy, soaring guitars, an unswerving rhythm section, epic songs and rich three-part vocal harmony.

Halo quickly gained a reputation for their electrifying live shows and soon found themselves on the radar of publishing giants Windswept Pacific, who snapped them up immediately after watching the band perform at The Astoria, London. Shortly afterwards new major label offshoot Sony Soho^{2} (which would be rebranded in time as S2 Records) became favourites to sign them and the band promptly put pen to paper with Muff Winwood, head of Sony Europe, to sign a six-album deal.

Halo's first release, the ‘Still Here’ EP, was recorded in London and given away free to their rapidly expanding fan base with rave reviews. Kerrang urged readers not to ‘look this gift stallion in the mouth’ and to join Halo's mailing list pronto.

After a string of festivals and a heavy stint on the road touring with Rachel Stamp, The Strokes, Wheatus, The Cooper Temple Clause, Ocean Colour Scene and P!nk, Halo teamed up with Stereophonics producer Al Clay at ICP studios in Brussels and recorded their debut album ‘Lunatic Ride’ (typeset as LuNAtic riDe), released in 2002

Before the album was released three singles hit the Official Charts Company's UK Top 75 singles chart. The first ‘Cold Light Of Day’ reached 44 in the UK charts, ‘Never Ending’ went to 56 and ‘Sanctimonious’ (which they re-recorded with legendary producer Gil Norton, known from his work with Pixies and Foo Fighters) went to number 41. Mark Radcliffe also made it Radio 1's record of the week on the Mark and Lard show. In September 2002, the album was released by Sony S2 and just missed being a hit in the Top 75 albums chart, reaching number 76.

After a major shake-up of Sony Music, Halo were released from their contract alongside 40% of the labels roster, including chart giants Reef and Toploader, in 2003.

Halo, as a band, ceased soon afterwards.

In 2011, the band and their manager met up for a few nostalgic drinks and decided to do a one-off show in their hometown of Bristol. After playing a sell-out show, they decided the band was too good to lay dormant any longer and made the decision to reform. After a number of high-profile gigs, the band have been writing new material and have started recording their long-awaited second album at Distiller Studios, with producer Stew Jackson, due for release in 2014.

Halo will be touring and playing festivals in 2014 to promote their second album, due for release in the summer.

== Band members ==
=== Current line-up ===
- Graeme Moncrieff - Vocals, Guitar
- Iain Moncrieff - Vocals, Guitar
- Stevie Yeomans - Vocals, Bass, Keyboards
- Jim Davey - Drums

=== Previous members ===
- Blake Davies - Drums (2003–2004)

== Discography ==
=== Album ===
Lunatic Ride (9 September 2002)	1. "Still Here"; 2. "Shine"; 3. "Cold Light Of Day"; 4. "All Or Nothing"; 5. "Only For You"; 6. "Escape"; 7. "Sanctimonious"; 8. "Here I Am"; 9. "Incinerator"; 10. "Feel"; 11. "Never Ending"; 12. "Vampire Song"; 13. "Perfectly Still"

=== Singles ===
		UK Singles Chart
"Cold Light of Day" (4 February 2002)	1. "Cold Light Of Day"; 2. "Bedtime"; 3. "I Confess"	#49
"Sanctimonious" (20 May 2002)	CD1: 1. "Sanctimonious"; 2. "Only For You"; 3. "Lunatic Ride"; CD2: 1. "Sanctimonious"; 2. "Angst"; 3. "Cracked"	#44
"Never Ending" (26 August 2002)	CD1: 1. "Never Ending"; 2. "Flatlined"; 3. The Vampire Song (Acoustic); CD2: 1. "Never Ending"; 2. "Last Request"; 3. "Voice From The Grave"	#56

=== EP ===
Still Here (2001)	1. "Still Here"; 2. "Sanctimonious"; 3. "Echoes"; 4. "Half Formed Thoughts"

== See also ==
- List of Peel sessions
