= Big Audio Dynamite discography =

- Studio albums: 9
- Live albums: 3
- Compilation albums: 7
- Singles: 17
- Video albums: 2

Big Audio Dynamite (later known as Big Audio Dynamite II and Big Audio, and often abbreviated BAD) were an English musical group formed in 1984 by the ex-guitarist and singer of the Clash, Mick Jones. The group is noted for its effective mixture of varied musical styles, incorporating elements of punk rock, dance music, hip hop, reggae, and funk. BAD's one constant throughout frequent shifts in membership and musical direction is the vocals provided by Mick Jones. After releasing a number of well-received albums and touring extensively throughout the 1980s and 1990s, Big Audio Dynamite disbanded in 1997. In 2011, the band embarked on a reunion tour.

== Albums ==
=== Studio albums ===
Title	Album details	Peak chart positions						Certifications
Title	Album details	UK	AUS	CAN	NZ	SWE	US	Certifications
This Is Big Audio Dynamite	Released: 1 November 1985; Label: Columbia; Formats: CD, LP, MC	27	87	—	8	—	103	UK: Gold
No. 10, Upping St.	Released: 27 October 1986; Label: Columbia; Formats: CD, LP, MC	11	85	—	23	49	119	UK: Silver
Tighten Up Vol. 88	Released: 27 June 1988; Label: Columbia; Formats: CD, LP, MC	33	—	—	—	—	102	
Megatop Phoenix	Released: 4 September 1989; Label: Columbia; Formats: CD, LP, MC	26	120	—	—	—	85	
Kool-Aid (as Big Audio Dynamite II)	Released: 22 October 1990; Label: Columbia; Formats: CD, LP, MC	55	145	—	—	—	—	
The Globe (as Big Audio Dynamite II)	Released: 16 July 1991; Label: Columbia; Formats: CD, LP, MC	63	10	69	16	—	76	AUS: Gold; US: Gold
Higher Power (as Big Audio)	Released: 8 November 1994; Label: Columbia; Formats: CD, 2xLP, MC, MD	—	—	—	—	—	—	
F-Punk	Released: 20 June 1995; Label: Radioactive; Formats: CD, 2xLP, MC	—	161	—	—	—	—	
Entering a New Ride	Released: 1999; Label: Self-released; Formats: digital download	—	—	—	—	—	—	
"—" denotes releases that did not chart or were not released in that territory.

=== Live albums ===
Title	Album details
Ally Pally Paradiso (as Big Audio Dynamite II)	Released: 1991; Label: Columbia; Formats: CD, LP; Promo-only release
On the Road Live '92 (as Big Audio Dynamite II)	Released: 1992; Label: Columbia; Formats: CD, MC; EP release
Class of '92 (as Big Audio Dynamite II)	Released: February 2013; Label: Floating World; Formats: CD

=== Compilation albums ===
Title	Album details	Peak chart positions
Title	Album details	AUS
The Lost Treasure of Big Audio Dynamite I & II	Released: 9 November 1993; Label: Columbia; Formats: 2xCD; Australia and Japan-only release	124
Looking for a Song (as Big Audio)	Released: 1994; Label: Columbia; Formats: 2xCD; Promo-only release	-
Planet B.A.D.	Released: 12 September 1995; Label: Columbia; Formats: CD, MC, MD	-
Super Hits	Released: 4 May 1999; Label: Columbia/Legacy; Formats: CD, MC	-
Big Audio Dynamite I & II	Released: 2000; Label: Sony Music; Formats: CD; US-only release	-
Original Album Classics	Released: 2008; Label: Columbia/Sony BMG/Legacy; Formats: 5xCD	-
The Best of Big Audio Dynamite	Released: 5 June 2009; Label: Camden/Sony Music; Formats: CD	-

=== Video albums ===
Title	Album details
BAD I + II	Released: 1992; Label: SMV Enterprises; Formats: VHS
Big Audio Dynamite Live: E=MC2	Released: 2007; Label: Cherry Red Films; Formats: DVD

== Singles ==
Title	Year	Peak chart positions								Certifications	Albums
Title	Year	UK	AUS	CAN	IRE	NZ	US	US Dance	US Alt	Certifications	Albums
"The Bottom Line"	1985	97	34	—	—	38	—	33 (Note: "The Bottom Line" and "BAD" charted together on the Billboard Hot Dance Club Play chart.)	—		This Is Big Audio Dynamite
"E=MC²"	1986	11	47	—	11	18	—	37	—		This Is Big Audio Dynamite
"Medicine Show"	1986	29	—	—	—	—	—	42 (Note: "Medicine Show" and "This Is Big Audio Dynamite" charted together on the Billboard Hot Dance Club Play chart.)	—		This Is Big Audio Dynamite
"C'mon Every Beatbox"	1986	51	—	—	—	—	—	16 (Note: "C'mon Every Beatbox", and "Badrock City" charted together on the Billboard Hot Dance Club Play chart. "Badrock City" also charted at number 66 on the Hot Black Singles chart.)	—		No. 10, Upping St.
"V. Thirteen"	1987	49	—	—	—	—	—	15 (Note: "V. Thirteen" and "Hollywood Boulevard" charted together on the Billboard Hot Dance Club Play chart.)	—		No. 10, Upping St.
"Sightsee M.C!"	1987	94	—	—	—	—	—	—	—		No. 10, Upping St.
"Just Play Music!"	1988	51	—	—	—	49	—	45	1		Tighten Up Vol. 88
"Other 99"	1988	81	—	—	—	—	—	—	13		Tighten Up Vol. 88
"James Brown"	1989	—	—	—	—	—	—	19 (Note: "James Brown" and "If I Were John Carpenter" charted together on the Billboard Hot Dance Club Play chart.)	2		Megatop Phoenix
"Contact"	1989	86	—	—	—	—	—	18 (Note: "Contact" and "In Full Effect" charted together on the Billboard Hot Dance Club Play chart.)	6		Megatop Phoenix
"Free"	1990	—	—	—	—	—	—	47	22		Flashback (soundtrack)
"Rush" (as Big Audio Dynamite II)	1991	— (Note: In some territories, including the UK and Ireland, "Rush" was released as a double A-sided single, with the Clash's re-release of "Should I Stay or Should I Go" designated 'A' and "Rush" designated 'AA'. The official UK charts did not recognise the release as a two-sided hit, however, only listing "Should I Stay or Should I Go" (which reached number 1). "Rush" did not officially chart in the UK.)	1	73	2	1	32	36	1	AUS: Gold; NZ: Gold	The Globe
"The Globe" (as Big Audio Dynamite II)	1991	—	8	—	—	10	72	28	3	AUS: Gold	The Globe
"Innocent Child" (as Big Audio Dynamite II)	1992	—	67	—	—	—	—	—	—		The Globe
"Looking for a Song" (as Big Audio)	1994	68	133	—	—	—	—	—	24		Higher Power
"I Turned Out a Punk"	1995	—	181	—	—	—	—	—	—		F-Punk
"Sunday Best"	1998	—	—	—	—	—	—	—	—		Entering a New Ride
"—" denotes releases that did not chart or were not released in that territory.
