= NME compilation albums =

Since its turnaround in the early-1980s, the New Musical Express (more commonly known as the NME) has occasionally supplied vinyl, cassettes and more recently CDs on its cover. Many popular alternative artists have appeared on NME compilations, including the Smiths, Blur, Franz Ferdinand, The Stone Roses and the Libertines.

The NME have also issued compilation albums for sale, such as In A Field of Their Own and Ruby Trax.

== History ==
NME have included covermount albums for a long time. The Clash's release Capital Radio, which was released 9 April 1977, could only be obtained by sending away a coupon featured in one issue of the NME, and the red sticker from the cover of the band's debut album. The NME also released the much regarded compilation album C86, documenting the birth of jangling indie pop, in 1986. Big Audio Dynamite II released their second album The Globe with a coupon, which had to be sent to the NME, to receive their first live album. In 1992–1993, NME released their own compilations, In a Field of Their Own and Ruby Trax, all containing exclusive recordings. Around this time, they started covermounting cassettes on their magazines, such as the Brat Pack series, and NME Xmas Dust Up in late 1994, a mix by The Chemical Brothers (their fourth and final release using their original The Dust Brothers). In 1997, Beat Up the NME, mixed by Fatboy Slim, was also a covermount. A list of the covermounts is below. In 2005–2007, the NME released more commercially sold compilations like those from 1992 to 1993, The Essential Bands series. Also, NME released a commercially available album, also featuring exclusive recordings like their 1992–1993 albums, NME In Association With War Child Presents 1 Love, as a charity album in 2002.

== Discography ==
=== 1992 ===
Date of Issue	Title (Catalogue No.)	Track listing
1992	In a Field of Their Own: Highlights of Glastonbury 1992 (GLASTON1DCD)	Disc 1: 1. The Orb – A Huge Ever Growing Pulsating Brain that Rules from The Centre of The Ultraworld; 2. Jah Wobble's Invaders of The Heart – Do You Live What You Sing?; 3. Flowered Up – Weekender; 4. James – Gold Mother; 5. Dr Phibes & the House of Wax Equations – Hazy Lazy Holograi; 6. Fat Dinosaur – Love; 7. Senser – The Journey of Life; 8. Curve – Faît Accompli; 9. The Faith Healers – Reptile Smile; 10. The Breeders – Iris; 11. Lush – Starlust; Disc 2: 1. Billy Bragg and The Redstars – Accident Waiting to Happen; 2. Carter USM – Sheriff Fatman; 3. The Levellers – Battle of the Beanfield; 4. Ned's Atomic Dustbin – Grey Cell Green; 5. The Frank And Walters – Walter's Trip; 6. The Family Cat – Steamroller; 7. The Real People – What You Want; 8. Spiritualized – Shine a Light; 9. Kitchens of Distinction – Mad as Snow; 10. Thousand Yard Stare – Seasonstream; 11. Midway Still – Better Than Before; 12. The Senseless Things – Too Much Kissing; 13. Blur – Sunday Sunday

=== 1993 ===
Date of Issue	Title (Catalogue No.)	Track listing
1993	Glastonbury 93: In a Field of Their Own Volume Two - Highlights From The NME Stage (GLASTON2DCD)	Disc 1: 1. Suede – My Insatiable One (3:28); 2. The Auteurs – Early Years (4:38); 3. Dodgy – Stand By Yourself (4:05); 4. Eat – Bellytown (4:02); 5. Adorable – Sistine Chapel Ceiling (3:45); 6. Belly – Angel (2:46); 7. The God Machine – She Said (4:33); 8. Mega City Four – Enemy Skies (4:11); 9. Lemonheads – Hannah And Gabi (2:46); 10. Superchunk – Seed Toss (2:47); 11. Teenage Fanclub – Everything Flows (8:02); Disc 2: 1. The Orb – Blue Room (8:39); 2. Stereo MC's – Fade Away (4:55); 3. Ultramarine – Pansy (6:09); 4. The Verve – Gravity Grave (9:23); 5. Spiritualized – Take Your Time (6:56)

=== 1995 ===
Date of Issue	Title (Catalogue No.)	Track listing
28/01/95	NME Brat Pack '95 (NME BRAT 95)	1. Blur – This Is A Low; 2. Gene Sick, Sober and Sorry; 3. Portishead – Numbed in Moscow; 1. Oasis – (It's Good) To Be Free; 2. Paul Weller – This is No Time
??/??/95	WEA NME^{2}	1. Green Day – No Pride; 2. Red Hot Chili Peppers – Warped; 3. Electrafixion – Lowdown; 4. Better Than Ezra – Good; 5. Lick – Fireboy; 1. The Pretenders – Night In My Veins; 2. The Flaming Lips – Brainville; 3. Suggs – Haunted; 4. k.d. lang – Get Some; 5. Alanis Morissette – You Oughta Know
18/11/95	NME USA Today (NME NOV 95)	1. Sonic Youth – Unwind; 2. Boss Hog – Sam; 1. Garbage – Supervixen; 2. Rocket From The Crypt – Born In '69; 3. The Amps – Empty Glasses

=== 1996 ===
Date of Issue	Title (Catalogue No.)	Track listing
27/01/96	NME Brat Pack '96 (NME BRAT 96)	1. Blur – TOPMAN; 2. Pulp – Ansaphone; 3. Paul Weller – Stanley Road (demo); 1. Oasis – Bonehead's Bank Holiday; 2. Supergrass – I'd Like To Know; 3. The Prodigy – Firestarter (Empirion Mix)
03/02/96	NME Bus '96 (NME B-BUS 96)	1. The Bluetones – Driftwood; 2. Fluffy – Crossdresser; 1. The Cardigans – Seems Hard; 2. Heavy Stereo – Cartoon Moon
??/06/96	Here Comes The Summer (NME FEST 96)	1. Cast – Better Man; 2. Lush – I've Been Here Before; 3. Bis – Secret Vampires; 4. Mansun – Ski Jump Nose; 5. Dodgy – Homegrown; 6. Pusherman – Whole; 1. The Afghan Whigs – My Enemy; 2. Super Furry Animals – Mario Man; 3. Babybird – Losing My Hair; 4. Northern Uproar – Goodbye; 5. Dubstar – A Certain Sadness; 6. Smaller – Giz a Life
??/10/96	Bleeping with the NME (NME MC OCT 96)	1. Orbital – The Box; 2. Underworld – Pearl's Girl (NME Mix); 3. The Chemical Brothers – Loops of Fury; 1. Goldie – This is a Baad (Source Direct Mix); 2. Leftfield – Filler Fish; 3. DJ Shadow – Changeling
??/??/96	WEA NME 3	1. Alanis Morissette – Ironic; 2. Porno for Pyros – Kimberly Austin; 3. Catatonia – Lost Cat; 4. Jaguar – But Tomorrow; 5. You Am I – Mr Milk; 1. Mark Morrison – Crazy; 2. Spacehog – In the Meantime; 3. Nada Surf – Sleep; 4. Elvis Costello – Distorted Angel; 5. The Flaming Lips – Waterbug

=== 1997 ===
Date of Issue	Title (Catalogue No.)	Track listing
February 1, 1997	Creation for the Nation (CREFREE'97)	1. Oasis – Live Forever (demo); 2. Arnold – Twist (demo); 3. The Boo Radleys – C'mon Kids; 4. Teenage Fanclub – I Don't Care; 5. Edward Ball – Trailblaze; 6. Ultra Living – Homesick; 1. 3 Colours Red – Nerve Gas; 2. 18 Wheeler – Prozac Beats; 3. Super Furry Animals – Arnofio/Glo In The Dark; 4. The Diggers – Circles; 5. Hurricane – Just Another Illusion
??? 1997	Beat Up The NME (NME NORM 1)	1. Pierre Henry – Psyche Rock (Fatboy Slim Malpaso Mix); 2. Death In Vegas – GBH; 3. Bassbin Twins – Volume One-Side Two-Track Two; 4. Psychedeliasmith – Fixy Jointy; 5. Basement Jaxx – Fly Life; 6. Elite Force – Saturnalia; 7. Monkey Mafia – Lion In the Hall; 8. Double 99 – RIP Groove; 9. Old Skool Flavas Vol III – Booty Beats; 10. C. J. Bolland vs Hardknox – The Prophet; 1. EPS & 2 Vibe – Big Time; 2. EPS & 2-Vibe – Hype the Funk; 3. 175 – Volume One; 4. Latyrx – Say That; 5. Kaleef – Trials of Life (Fishead Inst); 6. Mr Dan – One Man Banned; 7. Bassbin Twins – Out of Hand; 8. Overseer – Hit The Tarmac; 9. Cut La Roc – Post Punk Progressive; 10. Sensateria – Give Me My Auger Back

=== 1998 ===
Date of Issue	Title (Catalogue No.)	Track listing
31/01/98	NME Brat Pack '98 (NME BRAT 98)	1. Beck – "Deadweight"; 2. Radiohead – "Meeting in the Aisle"; 3. Prodigy – "Smack My Bitch Up"; 4. Stereophonics – "A Thousand Trees"; 5. Death in Vegas – "Dirt"; 6. Blur – I'm Just a Killer for your Love"; 7. Mansun – "The World's Still Open"; 8. Bentley Rhythm Ace – "Why is a Frog too..." 9. Travis – "20"; 10. The Seahorses – "Round the Universe"
21/03/98	NME Clean Sweep (NME AST 98)	1. Super Furry Animals – "Bad Behaviour"; 2. Stereophonics – "Traffic"; 3. Travis – "Good Feeling"; 4. Warm Jets – "Down, Down, Down"; 5. Dawn of the Replicants – "Radars"; 6. Idlewild – "You Just Have to be who you are" 7. Mogwai – "Ex Cowboy"; 8. Lo Fidelity Allstars – "One Man's Fear"; 9. Earl Brutus – "Come Taste my Mind"; 10. The Deftones – "My Own Summer (Shove It)"; 11. Asian Dub Foundation – "Assassin"; 12. Bentley Rhythm Ace – "Running on the Spot"; 13. theaudience – "I Never Have Been Done"; 14. Therapy? – "Tightrope Walker"; 15. Spiritualized with Suicide – "Rocket USA"; All tracks recorded live at the Astoria Theare, London, between 18 and 25 January 1998
??/??/98	NME presents Radio 1 Sound City Newcastle-Upon-Tyne (NME SC 98)	1. Stereophonics – Carrot Cake & Wine (Live); 2. Fatboy Slim – Kalifornia (Simons Edit); 3. Rocket From The Crypt – Lipstick (Radio 1 Session); 4. Six By Seven – Get A Real Tattoo; 5. Neville Marcano – Root Cage; 6. Hefner – Pull Yourself Together; 7. Gorky's Zygotic Mynci – Hush The Warmth; 8. Clinic – Kimberly; 9. Super Furry Animals – Guacamole; 10. Terrorvision – Spanner In The Works; 11. Campag Velocet – Harsh Shark (Live At Reading 1998); 12. Mogwai – I Don't Know What To Say; 13. Plastikman – Are Friends Electrik (NME Edit); 14. Symposium – Circles, Squares & Lines; 15. 3 Colours Red – Be Myself; 16. Gene – Olympian (Live At Royal Albert Hall 1997)
26/09/98	Parlophone: A Flavour of the Label (NME 001)	1. Beastie Boys – Intergalactic; 2. Bentley Rhythm Ace – Madam, Your Carriage Awaits; 3. Mansun – Television; 4. Idlewild – 4 People Do Good; 5. Dr. John – John Gris (j.spaceman mix); 6. Neil Finn – Twisty Bass; 7. Sparklehorse – Hundreds of Sparrows; 8. Liz Horsman – This Is Blue; 9. The Supernaturals – Country Music; 10. The Dandy Warhols – Hard On For Jesus; 11. Sean Lennon – Spaceship; 12. Cecil – Larger than a Mountain to the Ant; 13. Bran Van 3000 – Forest; 14. K-Klass – Live It Up (Perpetual Motion Remix)

=== 1999 ===
Date of Issue	Title (Catalogue No.)	Track listing
??/??/99	Spring Offensive (NME SPR 99)	1. Suede – Popstar; 2. Cast – Dreamer; 3. Pavement – The Hexx; 4. Basement Jaxx – Same Old Show; 5. Regular Fries – Dream Lottery; 6. Underworld – Moaner; 7. Mogwai – Small Children in the Background; 8. Add N To (X) – Robot New York; 9. Mishka – Bring A Man Down; 10. Ultrasound – Fame Thing; 11. Sebadoh – Flame (exclusive acoustic version); 12. Super Furry Animals – Download; 13. The Flaming Lips – The Spark That Bled; 14. Travis – She's So Strange
??/??/99	NME On: 1 (NME ON 1 – 1)	1. Capitol K – Song For Banana; 2. Big Leaves – Sly Alibi; 3. Jim O'Rourke – Woman Of The World; 4. The Donnas – Get U Alone; 5. Younger Younger 28's – We're Going Out; 6. Seafruit – Looking For Sparks; 7. Bellatrix – Silverlight; 8. The Webb Brothers – I'm Over And I Know It (radio edit); 9. To Rococo Rot – Telema; 10. Zan Lyons – Suicide (new version); 11. Jumbo – HON Honey; 12. The New Electrics – Beautiful Mind; 13. Jadell – Keep On; 14. Beber – "Juvenile Delinquent"; 15. Roots Manuva – Juggle Tings Proper
??/??/99	Annual Probe Volume 1 (NME BRATS 99)	1. Manic Street Preachers – This Is Yesterday (Live); 2. Massive Attack – Mezzanine; 3. Placebo – Burger Queen; 4. Stereophonics – T-shirt Suntan (Live); 5. Mansun – Special/Blown It (Delete As Appropriate); 6. Gomez – 78 Stone Wobble (Live); 7. UNKLE – Celestial Annihilation; 8. Chef – Simultaneous; 9. Air – Kelly Watch The Stars (Edit); 10. Fun Lovin' Criminals – All My Time Is Gone; 11. Ash – Numbskull; 12. Embrace – The Good Will Out (Live); 13. Fatboy Slim – Soul Surfing
??/??/99	Annual Probe Volume 2 (NME BRATS II 99)	1. Mercury Rev – Endlessly; 2. Elliott Smith – Pictures Of Me; 3. Arab Strap – Piglet; 4. The Afghan Whigs – Somethin' Hot; 5. Royal Trux – Stevie (For Steven S); 6. Quasi – I Never Want To See You Again; 7. Leila – Won't You Be My Baby, Baby; 8. Third Eye Foundation – A Galaxy Of Scars; 9. Boards of Canada – Roygbiv; 10. Jurassic 5 – Concrete Schoolyard; 11. MDK – Acid Rave (All The Girls Love An); 12. Godspeed You! Black Emperor – The Dead Flag Blues (Edit)
??/??/99	Priceless Creation (NME-CRE 1999)	1. Oasis – Acquiesce; 2. Primal Scream – Star; 3. My Bloody Valentine – Soft As Snow (But Warm Inside); 4. Teenage Fanclub – Mellow Doubt; 5. The Boo Radleys – Free Huey; 6. 3 Colours Red – This Is My Hollywood; 7. Edward Ball – Love Is Blue; 8. Sugar – JC Auto; 9. The Jesus and Mary Chain – Cracking Up; 10. Super Furry Animals – Gathering Moss
??/??/99	The Glastonbury Broadcasts Vol 1 (NME-BBC GLASTO 99)	1. Supergrass – Caught By The Fuzz; 2. Oasis – Rock'n'Roll Star; 3. Ocean Colour Scene – The Day We Caught The Train; 4. Reef – Allotment; 5. Cast – Alright; 6. Jeff Buckley – Eternal Life; 7. The Cure – Just Like Heaven; 8. Pulp – Sorted for E's and Wizz; 9. The Verve – Gravity Grave; 10. Orbital – Chime
Autumn 1999	Bollox To Ibiza (NME AC 99)	1. Campag Velocet – Bon Chic Bon Genre; 2. Leftfield – 6/8 War; 3. Kevin Rowland – I Can't Tell The Bottom From The Top; 4. Royal Trux – Waterpark; 5. LFO/Aphex Twin – Simon From Sydney; 6. Public Enemy – World Tour Sessions; 7. Stereolab – Come and Play in the Milky Night; 8. The High Llamas – Harper's Romo; 9. David Axelrod – Holy Thursday; 10. Death In Vegas – Dirge
??/12/99	Might Club (NME DEC 1999)	1. Basement Jaxx – Don't Give Up; 2. Beastie Boys – Remote Control; 3. Ian Brown – So Many Soldiers; 4. Folk Implosion – My Ritual; 5. Regular Fries – Swimming In Someone Else's Swimming Pool; 6. Suede – Indian Strings; 7. Smog – Held; 8. The Flaming Lips – Race for the Prize; 9. Jim O'Rourke – Ghost Ship In A Storm; 10. Rage Against the Machine – Calm Like a Bomb; 11. Death In Vegas – Flying; 12. Pavement – Major Leagues; 13. Campag Velocet – Only Answers Delay Our Time; 14. Bonnie 'Prince' Billy – Death To Everyone

=== 2000 ===
Date of Issue	Title (Catalogue No.)	Track listing
??/02/00	The Bands Who (NME BRATS 02-2000)	1. Fatboy Slim – Build It Up – Tear It Down; 2. Oasis – Half The World Away; 3. Terris – Searching for the Switches; 4. Blur – Trimm Trabb; 5. Ian Brown – Free My Way; 6. Beth Orton – Central Reservation (Spiritual Life/Ibadan Remix); 7. Mogwai – Cody; 8. Travis – As You Are (Live); 9. Super Furry Animals – Citizen's Band; 10. Death In Vegas – Death Threat; 11. Muse – Sober; 12. The Stone Roses – I Am The Resurrection
12/02/00	Come On Try Young (NME NB12-02-00)	1. Sigur Rós – Svefn-g-englar; 2. Coldplay – High Speed; 3. Clearlake – Something To Look Forward To; 4. Pharoahe Monch – Simon Says; 5. Max Tundra – 6161; 6. Lupine Howl – Sniff the Glue; 7. Amen – Coma America; 8. Goatsnake – Long Gone; 9. Will Haven – Fresno; 10. Mos Def – Hip Hop; 11. Romanthony – Floorpiece; 12. Alpinestars – Cresta La Wave; 13. Zan Lyons – Desolate; 14. Doves – Here It Comes

=== 2001 ===
Date of Issue	Title (Catalogue No.)	Track listing
06/10/01	Exclusives! (NME EX 6-10-01)	1. So Solid Crew Featuring Asher D - Woah; 2. Suede - Another No-One (Live @ El Rey Theatre, Los Angeles, May 22, 1997); 3. Roots Manuva - Dreamy Days (Lotek Bonanza Relick); 4. Oasis - Rock 'N' Roll Star (Live); 5. Aphex Twin - Avril 14th 6. The Charlatans - Shotgun; 7. Mercury Rev - Tides Of The Moon (Live Carling Weekend Festival, Reading, August 2001); 8. Pulp - Party Hard (Live Paleo Festival, Nyon, Switzerland, July 24, 2001); 9. The Music - New Instrumental (Live Leeds Rocket for BBC Radio 1's Lamacq Live, May 24, 2001); 10. ARE Weapons - Saigon Disco (Live); 11. Kurupt - Ride Wit' Us (Remix); 12. The Coral - Shadows Fall; 13. Fatboy Slim - Drop The Hate (Laid Remix); 14. Stanton Warriors - Right Here (Club Mix); 15. Starsailor - Fever (Live Acoustic for Nemone in the BBC Radio 1 Live Lounge, April 19, 2001); 16. Elbow - Coming Second (Live for SBN)
??/12/01	2001 The Album of the Year (NME AOTY DEC 2001)	1. The Strokes – Soma; 2. Spiritualized – The Twelve Steps; 3. Basement Jaxx – Crazy Girl; 4. Mercury Rev – Little Rhymes; 5. Björk – Unison; 6. Elbow – Scattered Black And Whites; 7. Slipknot – The Heretic Anthem; 8. Andrew WK – Party Til You Puke; 9. New Order – Turn My Way; 10. Oxide & Neutrino – Up Middle Finger; 11. N.E.R.D – Bobby James; 12. Clearlake – Jumble Sailing; 13. Kings Of Convenience – Toxic Girl; 14. Gorillaz – New Genius (Brother); 15. Starsailor – Talk Her Down; 16. Jay-Z – Takeover; 17. Beanie Sigel – Think It's A Game; 18. Pulp – The Birds In Your Garden

=== 2002 ===
Date of Issue	Title (Catalogue No.)	Track listing
23/10/02	The New Rock Revolution (NME NRR1)	1. The Libertines – Boys In The Band; 2. Yeah Yeah Yeahs – Miles Away; 3. The Beatings – What You Say; 4. The Von Bondies – My Baby's Cryin'; 5. The Datsuns – Little Bruise (SBN live session); 6. Ikara Colt – At The Lodge; 7. The Cooper Temple Clause – Amber; 8. Black Rebel Motorcycle Club – Waiting Here; 9. Interpol – Specialist; 10. The Thrills – Santa Cruz (You're Not That Far); 11. The Coral – Time Travel; 12. Radio 4 – New Disco; 13. Burning Brides – See You Empty; 14. The D4 – Get Loose (Alternative version); 15. The Music – Jag Tune

=== 2003 ===
Date of Issue	Title (Catalogue No.)	Track listing
??/??/03	NME Rock 'n' Roll Riot 2: Down The Front (NME 03-3B)	1. The Von Bondies – No Regrets; 2. AFI – The Days Of The Phoenix; 3. Franz Ferdinand – Better On Holiday; 4. Josh Homme and PJ Harvey – Powdered Wig Machine; 5. Stellastarr* – Pulp Song; 6. The Ordinary Boys – In Awe Of The Awful; 7. The Stills – Love And Death; 8. Jet – Lazy Gun; 9. My Red Cell – She's Leaving; 10. The Zutons – Zuton Fever; 11. Marc Carroll – Idiot World; 12. The Thrills – Your Love Is Like Las Vegas

=== 2004 ===
Date of Issue	Title (Catalogue No.)	Track listing
2004	NME Awards 2004 Rare & Unreleased (NME CD 04-1)	1. Black Rebel Motorcycle Club – The Hardest Button To Button; 2. Franz Ferdinand – Michael (Live); 3. Outkast – Happy Valentine's Day; 4. The Libertines – Up The Bracket (BBC Radio 1 Live); 5. Coldplay – See You Soon; 6. Jet – Are You Gonna Be My Girl (Live); 7. Radiohead – Paperbag Writer; 8. The Strokes – When It Started; 9. The Thrills – Last Night I Dreamt That Somebody Loved Me; 10. The Rapture – Echoes (Live); 11. Starsailor – Hot Burrito No. 2; 12. Funeral for a Friend – She Drove Me To Daytime Television; 13. Kylie Minogue – Slow (Chemical Brothers Remix); 14. The Von Bondies – Save My Life (BBC Radio 1 Session)
??/??/04	Kurt's Choice - compiled by Kurt Cobain (NME CD 04-2)	
19/06/04	Songs To Save Your Life - compiled by Morrissey (NME CD 04-3)	1. Morrissey – The Never Played Symphonies; 2. The Killers – Jenny Was a Friend of Mine; 3. Gene – Fighting Fit; 4. Sparks – Barbecutie; 5. The Slits – Love Und Romance; 6. New York Dolls – Vietnamese Baby; 7. Franz Ferdinand – Jacqueline (Live); 8. Raymonde – No-One Can Hold A Candle To You; 9. Ludus – Let Me Go Where My Pictures Go; 10. Sack – Colorado Springs; 11. Remma – Worry Young (Demo Version); 12. Pony Club – Single; 13. Jobriath – Morning Star Ship; 14. Damien Dempsey – Factories; 15. The Libertines – Time For Heroes; 16. Sir John Betjeman – A Child III
??/??/04	Declaration of Independence: The Sound of Domino (NME CD 04-4)	1. Franz Ferdinand – Shopping For Blood; 2. The Kills – Fuck The People; 3. Sons and Daughters – Broken Bones; 4. Archie Bronson Outfit – Kangaroo Heart; 5. The Blueskins – Change My Mind; 6. Clinic – The Magician; 7. Clearlake- Almost The Same; 8. Max Tundra – Lysine; 9. Four Tet – As Serious As Your Life; 10. Stephen Malkmus and the Jicks – Animal Midnight; 11. James Yorkston & The Athletes – Banjo #1; 12. U.N.P.O.C. – Amsterdam; 13. Adem – These Are Your Friends; 14. Hood – The Negatives; 15. Elliott Smith – The Ballad Of Big Nothing; 16. Pavement – Range Life
02/10/04	The Live CD – The Best of XFM Sessions 2004 (NME CD 04-5)	1. Razorlight – To The Sea (Live on Music: Response with Ian Camfield 06/11/2004); 2. The Zutons – You Will You Won't (Live on Music: Response with Ian Camfield 22/01/2004); 3. The Ordinary Boys – Maybe Someday (Live on Music: Response with Ian Camfield 04/02/2004); 4. Bloc Party – Little Thoughts (Live on Music: Response with Ian Camfield 27/04/2004); 5. The Others – This Is For The Poor (Live on X-posure Part 2 with John Kennedy 13/04/2004); 6. The Killers – Mr Brightside (Live on Music: Response with Ian Camfield 15/03/2004); 7. Delays – Stay Where You Are (Live on Music: Response with Ian Camfield 19/01/2004); 8. Stellastarr* – Somewhere Across Forever? (Live on Music: Response with Ian Camfield 26/02/2004); 9. 22-20s – Shoot Your Gun (Live on Music: Response with Ian Camfield 07/04/2004); 10. My Red Cell – Going Out For Nothing (Live on Music: Response with Ian Camfield 09/03/2004); 11. Dogs Die In Hot Cars – Lounger (Live on Music: Response with Ian Camfield 06/04/2004); 12. Charlotte Hatherley – Kim Wilde (Live on Music: Response with Ian Camfield 19/08/2004); 13. Keane – We Might as Well Be Strangers (Live on Music: Response with Ian Camfield 02/02/2004); 14. The Bees – Wash In The Rain (Live on Music: Response with Ian Camfield 19/04/2004)

=== 2005 ===
Date of Issue	Title (Catalogue No.)	Track listing
??/01/05	NME Awards 2005 - The Winners (NME CD 0501)	1. Kaiser Chiefs – Na Na Na Na Naa; 2. Franz Ferdinand – Missing You; 3. The Libertines – Can't Stand Me Now; 4. Muse – The Small Print; 5. The Killers – Change Your Mind; 6. Bloc Party – Tulips; 7. The Futureheads – Alms; 8. The Others – In The Background; 9. The Streets – Blinded By The Lights (Mitchell Bros Remix); 10. Graham Coxon – Spectacular; 11. Green Day – She's A Rebel (live); 12. Babyshambles – The Man Who Came To Stay; 13. New Order – I Told You So
18/06/05	Generation Punk – compiled by Green Day (NME CD 05-3)	1. My Chemical Romance – Give 'em Hell, Kid; 2. The Distillers – Drain The Blood; 3. Generation X – Kiss Me Deadly; 4. Operation Ivy – Knowledge; 5. AFI – Days of the Phoenix; 6. The Stooges – I Got a Right; 7. MC5 – The American Ruse; 8. Alkaline Trio – Back to Hell; 9. Deftones – Be Quiet and Drive (Far Away); 10. Dead Kennedys – California über alles 11. Filter – Captain Blight; 12. Stiff Little Fingers – Tin Soldiers; 13. Green Day – Letterbomb
20/08/05	NME Oasis On The Road World Tour 2005 (NME CD 05-4)	1. The Soundtrack of Our Lives – "Confrontation Camp"; 2. The Subways – "Oh Yeah" (Live at Islington Carling Academy); 3. The Zutons – "Dirty Dancehall"; 4. Jet – "Get What You Need"; 5. The Stands – "Turn the World Around"; 6. The Coral – "She Sings the Mourning"; 7. The Bees – "These Are The Ghosts" (Undead Version); 8. The Futureheads – "Banquo"; 9. 22-20S – "Devil In Me"; 10. Secret Machines – "The Road Leads Where It's Led"; 11. Yeti – "Never Lose Your Sense Of Wonder"; 12. Nic Armstrong and The Thieves – "Broken Month Blues"; 13. Oasis – "My Generation" (Live at City of Manchester Stadium)
??/??/05	NME The Soundtrack Of Your Summer	1. Arcade Fire – Neighborhood #3 (Power Out); 2. Kaiser Chiefs – Take My Temperature; 3. Arctic Monkeys – Fake Tales Of San Francisco; 4. Little Flames – Put Your Dukes Up John; 5. Editors – Lights; 6. The Cribs – You Were Always The One; 7. Maxïmo Park – Graffiti (Live In Japan); 8. Boy Kill Boy – Last Of The Great; 9. Juliette and the Licks – American Boy Vol 2; 10. Black Rebel Motorcycle Club – Howl; 11. The Longcut – Dead Man; 12. Art Brut – Formed A Band; 13. British Sea Power – Please Stand Up; 14. The Rakes – 22 Grand Job (Live At Reading)
26/11/05	NME: The Cool List 2005 (NME CD 05-6)	1. We Are Scientists – The Great Escape; 2. The Long Blondes – Lust In The Movies; 3. The Cribs – We Can No Longer Cheat You; 4. Mystery Jets – You Can't Fool Me Dennis; 5. Test Icicles – Maintain The Focus; 6. The Paddingtons – Panic Attack; 7. Antony and the Johnsons – Frankenstein; 8. The Go! Team – Ladyflash; 9. Kano – I Don't Know Why; 10. ¡Forward, Russia! – Thirteen; 11. Cut Copy – Future; 12. Be Your Own Pet – Bunk Trunk Skunk; 13. Dangerdoom – Mince Meat; 14. Dan Sartain – I Could Have Had You; 15. Clap Your Hands Say Yeah – Over And Over Again (Lost And Found); 16. Lupen Crook – Lucky 6

=== 2006 ===
Date of Issue	Title (Catalogue No.)	Track listing
04/03/06	The Shockwaves NME Awards 2006: The Winners (NME CD 06-01)	1. Franz Ferdinand – You Could Have It So Much Better; 2. Editors – Bullets; 3. The Long Blondes – Once and Never Again; 4. We Are Scientists – This Scene is Dead; 5. Oasis – "Rock 'N' Roll Star" (Live); 6. The Cribs – Mirror Kissers (Live); 7. Maxïmo Park – Now I'm All Over the Shop; 8. The Strokes – On the Other Side; 9. Kaiser Chiefs – Saturday Night (Live); 10. Ian Brown – My Star (album version); 11. Mystery Jets – The Tale; 12. Babyshambles – Albion
??/??/06	Best New Bands Showcase 2006 (NME CD 06-02)	1. Dirty Pretty Things – You Fucking Love It; 2. The Like – Too Late; 3. The Cribs – It Happened So Fast; 4. The Spinto Band – Mountains; 5. The Rakes – Binary Love; 6. Larrikin Love – On Sussex Downs; 7. Hot Chip – Careful; 8. ¡Forward, Russia! – Twelve; 9. Wolfmother – White Unicorn; 10. José González – All You Deliver; 11. Two Gallants – Las Cruces Jail; 12. Brakes – I Can't Stand To Stand Beside You; 13. Guillemots – Go Away; 14. The Go! Team – Huddle Flash (Kevin Shields Vs The Go!Team)

== See also ==
- NME Album of the Year

=== NME releases ===
- 1977: Capital Radio
- 1981: C81
- 1986: C86
- 1988: Sgt. Pepper Knew My Father
- 1991: Ally Pally Paradiso
- 1993: Ruby Trax
- 1994: Dog Man Star
- 1997: Beat Up the NME
- 2002: NME In Association With War Child Presents 1 Love
- 2006: NME Presents the Essential Bands 2006
- 2008: NME Awards 2008
- 2008: Violet Hill
- 2008: Dig Out Your Soul Songbook
