= Super Hits (Big Audio Dynamite album) =

Greatest hits album by Big Audio Dynamite
- Released: 4 May 1999
- Genre: Rock, dance-rock, alternative dance, post-punk
- Length: 46:51
- Label: Columbia
- Producer: Bruce Dickinson

Big Audio Dynamite chronology
Entering a New Ride (1997)	Super Hits (1999)

Professional ratings
Review scores
Source	Rating
AllMusic	3/5 stars
The New Rolling Stone Album Guide	3/5 stars

Super Hits is a compilation album by Big Audio Dynamite. The album was released on 4 May 1999.

== Track listing ==
1. "The Bottom Line" (Mick Jones) – 3:46
2. "C'mon Every Beatbox" (Jones, Don Letts) – 4:32
3. "Rush" (Jones) – 4:17
4. "The Globe" (Jones, Gary Stonadge) – 3:47
5. "Just Play Music!" (Jones, Letts, Greg Roberts) – 4:12
6. "V. Thirteen" (Jones, Joe Strummer) – 4:40
7. "Sightsee M.C!" (Jones, Strummer) – 4:54
8. "Contact" (Dan Donovan, Jones) – 4:13
9. "E=MC²" (Jones, Letts) – 5:58
10. "Medicine Show" (Jones, Letts) – 6:32
