= Looking for a Song =

Compilation album by Big Audio
- Released: 1994
- Recorded: 1984–1994
- Genre: Alternative rock
- Length: 60:50 / 31:14
- Label: CBS; 2SK 6567
- Producer: Mick Jones, André Shapps; Joe Strummer, Bill Price; Dan Donovan, Oliver "Olimax" Maxwell

Big Audio chronology
The Lost Treasure of Big Audio Dynamite I & II (1993)	Looking for a Song (1994)	Higher Power (1994)

Looking for a Song is a 2CD promo only compilation album by Big Audio Dynamite released in the US in 1994. The compilation was recorded over the previous decade, starting in 1984. It comprises Greatest Hits - The Radio Edits and Looking for a Song EP and was issued under the shortened band name Big Audio.

== Track listing ==
=== Greatest Hits - The Radio Edits ===
1. "Looking for a Song" (Radio Mix) - 4:46
2. "Innocent Child" (Edit) - 3:55
3. "The Globe" (Edit) - 3:46
4. "Rush" (Edit) - 3:08
5. "Free" (Edit) - 3:30
6. "Contact" (Edit) - 4:12
7. "James Brown" (Remix Edit) - 3:58
8. "Other 99" (Edit) - 4:27
9. "Just Play Music!" (Edit) - 3:56
10. "Hollywood Boulevard" - 3:57
11. "V. Thirteen" - 4:38
12. "C'Mon Every Beatbox" (Edit) - 4:31
13. "E=MC²" (Edit) - 4:32
14. "Medicine Show" (Edit) - 4:27
15. "The Bottom Line" (Edit) - 3:46

=== Looking for a Song EP ===
1. "Looking for a Song" (Album Version) - 3:46
2. "Mirror Man" - 4:19
3. "Looking for a Song" (The Zonka/Shapps Remix) - 7:18
4. "Medicine Show" (Live) - 8:36
5. "RusH" (Live) - 7:08

== Notes ==
- "Mirror Man" (written by Lionel Bart) was previously unreleased and remains exclusive to this release.
- The live versions of "Medicine Show" and "Rush" were recorded at the Mick Ronson memorial concert at the Hammersmith Odeon in April 1994.
