= The Lost Treasure of Big Audio Dynamite I & II =

Compilation album by Big Audio Dynamite
- Released: 9 November 1993
- Genre: Rock
- Label: Alex Records; Sony
- Producer: Mick Jones

Big Audio Dynamite chronology
On The Road Live '92 (1992)	The Lost Treasure of Big Audio Dynamite I & II (1993)	Higher Power (1994)

Professional ratings
Review scores
Source	Rating
AllMusic	2.5/5 stars

The Lost Treasure of Big Audio Dynamite I & II is a compilation album by Big Audio Dynamite. The album was released 9 November 1993 in Japan and Australia only.

The album features 14 remixes of classic Big Audio Dynamite hits, by such pre- and post- acid house remixers as Rick Rubin, Sam Sever, Paul "Groucho" Smykle and Andre Shapps. On Disc 1, the remixes are intended to enhance, rather than to deconstruct, the songs, allowing the hooks to continue to drive the new versions. On Disc 2, many recognizable elements of the songs are stripped away, leaving only a rhythmic shell. The album closes with a new song, "Looking for a Song", a future hit for the band, which in this album has not been subject to remixing.

== Track listing ==
=== CD One ===
No.	Title	Writer(s)	Length
1.	"The Bottom Line" (Def Jam remix)	Mick Jones	7:26
2.	"E=MC²" (Extended remix)	Dan Donovan, Jones, Don Letts	5:35
3.	"This Is B.A.D."	Jones	5:53
4.	"Medicine Show" (12" remix)	Jones, Letts, Leo Williams	8:55
5.	"Badrock City" (remix)	Jones, Letts	7:03
6.	"Hollywood Boulevard" (remix)	Jones, Letts	5:47
7.	"Lovesensi Overture" (remix)	Big Audio Dynamite	5:02

=== CD Two ===
No.	Title	Writer(s)	Length
1.	"Contact" (Club mix)	Donovan, Jones	6:43
2.	"If I Were John Carpenter" (remix)	Jones	7:26
3.	"Free" (WTG 12" mix)	Donovan, Jones	7:16
4.	"In Full Effect" (remix)	Jones, Greg Roberts	7:18
5.	"Rush" (UK White label remix)	Jones	8:48
6.	"The Globe" (Studio 54 mix)	Jones, Gary Stonadge	6:48
7.	"Innocent Child" (Ambient mix)	Jones	5:47
8.	"Looking for a Song"	Jones, Portaluri, Sion, Zefret	3:42

== Charts ==
Chart performance for The Lost Treasure of Big Audio Dynamite I & II
Chart (1993)	Peak position
Australian Albums (ARIA)	124
