= Planet B.A.D. =

Compilation album by Big Audio Dynamite
- Released: 12 September 1995
- Recorded: 1984–1995
- Genre: Alternative dance, rock, experimental rock, dance-rock
- Length: 65:10
- Label: Columbia
- Producer: 1–3 and 7–8: Mick Jones, 4–6: Mick Jones and Joe Strummer, 9–10: Mick Jones and Bill Price, 11–15: Mick Jones and André Shapps

Big Audio Dynamite chronology
F-Punk (1995)	Planet B.A.D. (1995)	Entering a New Ride (1997)

Professional ratings
Review scores
Source	Rating
AllMusic	4.5/5 stars

Planet B.A.D. is a compilation album by Big Audio Dynamite. The album was released 12 September 1995.

This compilation includes all but two of the band's singles tracked in the order they were released from all four major incarnations of BAD. Only "James Brown" and "Innocent Child" are missing, but it does include the single for "Free" which appeared on the Flashback OST.

While most of the songs are single versions, "E=MC²", "Medicine Show", "Sightsee M.C!" and "Just Play Music!" are included in their exact album mixes. In the cases of "Rush" and "The Bottom Line" this condensed the songs into simpler pop song structures. "The Bottom Line" for example in its single edit did not feature the introductory 'Horses are on the track' section. The edit of "Rush" was not the UK edit (that was featured as the b-side to The Clash's "Should I Stay or Should I Go") which faded out briefly before the end of the original album version. The edit featured removes the entire 'Rhythm and Melody' breakdown.

The version of "Harrow Road" here is a mix that is not available anywhere else. Most fans refer to it as the Ska Mix.

== Track listing ==
1. "The Bottom Line" (Mick Jones) – 3:46
2. "E=MC²" (Jones, Don Letts) – 5:58
3. "Medicine Show" (Jones, Letts) – 6:32
4. "C'mon Every Beatbox" (Jones, Letts) – 4:32
5. "V. Thirteen" (Jones, Joe Strummer) – 4:40
6. "Sightsee M.C!" (Jones, Strummer) – 4:54
7. "Just Play Music!" (Jones, Letts, Greg Roberts) – 4:12
8. "Other 99" (Jones, Letts) – 4:28
9. "Contact" (Dan Donovan, Jones) – 4:13
10. "Free" (Dan Donovan, Jones) – 3:32
11. "Rush" (Jones) 3:11
12. "The Globe" (Jones, Gary Stonadge) – 3:47
13. "Looking for a Song" (Jones, Portaluri, Sion, Zefret) – 3:46
14. "Harrow Road" (Ska Mix) (Fisher, Hare, Jones, Stonadge) – 3:42
15. "I Turned Out a Punk" (Jones) – 3:47
