= Kool-Aid (album) =

Studio album by Big Audio Dynamite II
- Released: 22 October 1990
- Recorded: 18 June 1990
- Genre: Rock; alternative dance; alternative rock; dance-rock
- Length: 51:15
- Label: Columbia
- Producer: Mick Jones; Oliver "Olimax" Maxwell; André Shapps

Big Audio Dynamite II chronology
Megatop Phoenix (1989)	Kool-Aid (1990)	The Globe (1991)

Professional ratings
Review scores
Source	Rating
AllMusic	2/5 stars
The Encyclopedia of Popular Music	2/5 stars

Kool-Aid is an album by Big Audio Dynamite II. It was their first album under this name and with this line-up, which had been changed by band leader Mick Jones in 1990. It was only released in the UK, Europe and Australia. Several of the songs appeared on the group's next worldwide release, The Globe, albeit in reworked form. Among them is "Change of Atmosphere", which was reworked into the group's number 1 hit "Rush". The Kool-Aid track "Kickin' In" is a significantly reworked version of "Free", a song Big Audio Dynamite previously recorded for the soundtrack of the 1990 film Flashback.

== Critical reception ==
Trouser Press wrote that "with a relatively loose feel and concept, Kool-Aid is Jones' most diverse outing ever, a limited-edition eight-song stopgap offering two acoustic ballads, acid-dance, techno-rock, Kraftwerk samples and even Laurie Anderson-styled poltergeist vocals, as well as a remixed (and retitled) version of "Free," the band's contribution to the Flashback soundtrack."

== Track listing ==
Side one
No.	Title	Writer(s)	Length
1.	"Change of Atmosphere"	Mick Jones	7:41
2.	"Can't Wait"	Mick Jones	5:04
3.	"Kickin' In"	Dan Donovan, Mick Jones	6:38
4.	"Innocent Child"	Mick Jones	6:38

Side two
No.	Title	Writer(s)	Length
5.	"On One"	Mick Jones	4:52
6.	"Kool-Aid"	Mick Jones, Gary Stonadge	5:30
7.	"In My Dreams"	Nick Hawkins, Mick Jones, Gary Stonadge	8:28
8.	"When the Time Comes"	Mick Jones, Gary Stonadge	7:10

== Personnel ==
Big Audio Dynamite II

- Mick Jones - vocals, guitar
- Nick Hawkins - guitar, vocals
- Gary Stonadge - bass guitar, vocals
- Chris Kavanagh - drums, vocals

Technical

- C.J., Dave Mercer, Mike Campbell - engineer
- Adam "Flea" Newman - "dynamite"
