= Higher Power (Big Audio Dynamite album) =

Studio album by Big Audio
- Released: 8 November 1994
- Genre: Alternative
- Length: 67:03
- Label: Columbia
- Producer: Mick Jones, André Shapps, Arthur Baker

Big Audio chronology
| The Lost Treasure of Big Audio Dynamite I & II (1993) | Higher Power (1994) | F-Punk (1995) |

Singles from Higher Power
- 1. "Looking for a Song" Released: 1994

Higher Power is the seventh album by Big Audio Dynamite (renamed Big Audio), released in 1994. First released in the US on 8 November, it was then released in the UK the following week on 14 November 1994. "Looking for a Song" was released as a single; it peaked at No. 24 on Billboard's Modern Rock Tracks chart. The band supported the album with a North American tour.

== Production ==
Many of its songs are about English middle class life. Mick Jones was inspired by Bob Marley to include uplifting messages in Higher Power's songs.

== Critical reception ==
Professional ratings
Review scores
| Source | Rating |
|---|---|
| AllMusic | 1.5/5 stars |
| Calgary Herald | C− |
| Chicago Tribune | 3/4 stars |
| The Encyclopedia of Popular Music | 2/5 stars |
| Entertainment Weekly | C− |
| Knoxville News Sentinel | 4/5 stars |

Trouser Press wrote that "Higher Power finds Jones and company operating at a decidedly lower level ... The hip dance-music sounds are there, but the tunes most certainly aren't." Entertainment Weekly thought that the album "continues Jones' bid for currency by experimenting with the sounds of London's dance clubs ... The result is neither good rave nor good rock."

The Knoxville News Sentinel called it "an alternative album at the core that absorbs a fun array of funk, pop and hip-hop influences for a distinctive and accessible blend." The Calgary Herald determined that "it just bops along with riffs that are pleasant enough but lack any edge, any passion."

== Track listing ==
Side one
| No. | Title | Writer(s) | Length |
|---|---|---|---|
| 1. | "Got to Wake Up" | Jones | 4:51 |
| 2. | "Harrow Road" | Graham Fisher, Kenneth Hare, Jones, Stonadge | 5:26 |
| 3. | "Looking for a Song" | Jones, Sergio Portaluri, David Sion, Fulvio Zefret | 3:47 |

Side two
| No. | Title | Writer(s) | Length |
|---|---|---|---|
| 4. | "Some People" | Hawkins, Jones | 4:55 |
| 5. | "Slender Loris" | Jones | 6:10 |
| 6. | "Modern Stoneage Blues" | Jones, Stonadge | 3:45 |

Side three
| No. | Title | Writer(s) | Length |
|---|---|---|---|
| 7. | "Melancholy Maybe" | Jones, Stonadge | 5:43 |
| 8. | "Over the Rise" | Jones | 4:57 |
| 9. | "Why Is It?" | Jones, Stonadge | 5:00 |
| 10. | "Moon" | Jones | 6:27 |

Side four
| No. | Title | Writer(s) | Length |
|---|---|---|---|
| 11. | "Lucan" | Hawkins, Jones, Stonadge | 5:49 |
| 12. | "Light Up My Life" | Jones | 4:35 |
| 13. | "Hope" | Jones, Stonadge | 5:38 |

== Personnel ==
=== Big Audio ===
- Mick Jones - vocals, guitar, producer
- Nick Hawkins - guitar, vocals, engineer
- André Shapps - keyboards, producer, engineer
- Gary Stonadge - bass, vocals
- Chris Kavanagh - drums, vocals
- Mickey Custance - DJ, vocals

=== Additional credits ===
- Ranking Roger - vocals
- Aki Omori, Loro Lucan - backing vocals on "Some People"
- Heathcote Williams - biographical editor
- John R.T. Davies - editing
- Arthur Baker - co-producer of track 6
- Würzel - photography
