= F-Punk =

Studio album by Big Audio Dynamite
- Released: 20 June 1995
- Studios: Pavilion Studios, London
- Genres: Alternative rock, post-punk
- Length: 62:17
- Label: Radioactive
- Producers: Mick Jones; André Shapps

Big Audio Dynamite chronology
Higher Power (1994)	F-Punk (1995)	Planet B.A.D. (1995)

Singles from F-Punk
- 1. "I Turned Out a Punk" Released: 1995

Professional ratings
Review scores
Source	Rating
AllMusic	2/5 stars
The Encyclopedia of Popular Music	3/5 stars
MusicHound Rock: The Essential Album Guide	2.5/5 stars
The New Rolling Stone Album Guide	2.5/5 stars

F-Punk is a studio album by Mick Jones' post-Clash band Big Audio Dynamite, released in 1995. It was the first album to be released under the name of Big Audio Dynamite since 1989's Megatop Phoenix. The title is a pun on the funk group P-Funk, and is supposed to imply "Fuck punk." The album cover lettering takes influence from London Calling, one of Mick Jones' albums with The Clash, which in turn was a copy of Elvis Presley's debut album.

== Critical reception ==
Trouser Press called the album "an attempt to cash in on a formidable legacy by largely abandoning dance sounds for unexceptional, straight-ahead rock — it’s emblematic of the band’s stylistic change that 'Push Those Blues Away' drops a promising jungle beat for plain-jane rock." The Hartford Courant wrote that "there's too much that sounds like demo tapes for a future album, fiddling around on keyboards, messing with volume dials, punching up experiments that don't always work." CMJ New Music Monthly thought that B.A.D. "has simply forgotten to draw the line between creative mixing and pure sludge." Entertainment Weekly wrote: "Beginning with a '1,2,3,4' count-off, the low-fi garage hum of 'I Turned Out a Punk' could act as a biography for any of the four members of the Clash."

== Track listing ==
- All songs by Mick Jones unless noted.
1. "I Turned Out a Punk" - 5:24
2. "Vitamin C" - 5:27
3. "Psycho Wing" 7:12
4. "Push Those Blues Away" (Mick Jones, Gary Stonadge) - 6:08
5. "Gonna Try" - 3:55
6. "It's a Jungle Out There" - 5:19
7. "Got To Set Her Free" - 3:51
8. "Get It All From My TV" - 4:04
9. "Singapore" - 5:25
10. "I Can't Go on Like This" (Mick Jones, Lauren Jones) - 5:54
11. "What About Love?" / "Suffragette City" (hidden track) (David Bowie) - 9:44 total

There is also a hidden track 3:47 into "I Turned Out a Punk".

== Personnel ==
=== Big Audio Dynamite ===
- Mick Jones - vocals, guitar, producer
- Nick Hawkins - guitar, vocals
- André Shapps - keyboards, producer
- Gary Stonadge - bass, vocals
- Chris Kavanagh - drums, vocals
- Micky Custance - DJ, percussion, vocals

=== Others ===
- Henery Glover - engineer
- Jason Eyers - engineer
- Tim Burrell - mastering
