= The Globe (album) =

Studio album by Big Audio Dynamite II
- Released: 16 July 1991
- Recorded: 1990–1991
- Genre: Rock, alternative dance
- Length: 50:37
- Label: Columbia
- Producer: Mick Jones; André Shapps; Oliver "Olimax" Maxwell

Big Audio Dynamite II chronology
Kool-Aid (1990)	The Globe (1991)	Ally Pally Paradiso (1991)

Singles from The Globe
- 1. "Rush" Released: June 1991; 2. "The Globe" Released: 12 December 1991; 3. "Innocent Child" Released: 1992

Professional ratings
Review scores
Source	Rating
AllMusic	4/5 stars

The Globe is the sixth album by alternative dance group Big Audio Dynamite II, their second album credited under that name instead of Big Audio Dynamite. It was released on 16 July 1991 in the United States, and in August elsewhere else, just after their limited UK-only album Kool-Aid and includes reworked versions of some of its songs. The Globe was certified Gold by the RIAA. Some CD versions came with the live album Ally Pally Paradiso as an additional disc.

== Cover design ==
The album cover was designed by surfer Shawn Stussy, who earlier founded the eponymous fashion brand.

== Tours ==
Big Audio Dynamite II toured to promote The Globe in late 1992. There was only one stop on the tour in the United States, at Tipitina's in New Orleans. However, they also opened for Public Enemy and U2 on the Achtung Baby tour. Furthermore, they toured in support of the album in the autumn of 1991. On that tour, The Farm opened for them.

== Track listing ==
- All songs written by Mick Jones and Gary Stonadge except as indicated.

Side one
No.	Title	Writer(s)	Length
1.	"Rush"	Jones	4:17
2.	"Can't Wait/Live"	Jones	4:37
3.	"I Don't Know"	Jones	5:59
4.	"The Globe"		6:04
5.	"Innocent Child"	Jones	5:58

Side two
No.	Title	Writer(s)	Length
6.	"Green Grass"	Jones, Stonadge, André Shapps	5:24
7.	"Kool-Aid"		4:05
8.	"In My Dreams"	Jones, Stonadge, Nick Hawkins	4:04
9.	"When the Time Comes"		6:32
10.	"The Tea Party"		3:39

== Personnel ==
Big Audio Dynamite II

- Mick Jones – lead vocals, guitar
- Nick Hawkins – guitar, backing vocals
- Gary Stonadge – bass guitar, backing vocals
- Chris Kavanagh – drums, percussion, backing vocals

Additional personnel

- Gobblebox – vocals on "The Globe"
- Sipho the Human Beatbox – beatbox on "The Globe"
- Lorna Stucki – vocals on "The Tea Party"
- André Shapps – engineer
- Shawn Stussy – artwork, design

== Charts ==
Chart (1991)	Peak position
Australian Albums (ARIA)	10
New Zealand Albums (RMNZ)	16
UK Albums (Official Charts)	63
US Billboard 200	76

== Certifications ==
Region	Certification	Certified units/sales
Australia (ARIA)	Gold	35,000^{^}
United States (RIAA)	Gold	500,000^{^}
^{^} Shipments figures based on certification alone.
