= Lounger =

Lounger may refer to:

- Lounger (horse), a racehorse
- "Lounger" (song), a 2004 song by British band Dogs Die in Hot Cars
- Lounge chair
