= Godhopping =

- CD single version 1 cover

Single by Dogs Die in Hot Cars

from the album Please Describe Yourself
- B-side: "Modern Woman" (live) "Eat Me Don't Eat Me" (demo) "Who Shot the Baby"
- Released: 25 May 2004
- Genre: Pop rock
- Length: 2:44
- Label: V2
- Songwriter(s): Craig Macintosh
- Producer(s): Clive Langer and Alan Winstanley

Dogs Die in Hot Cars singles chronology
"I Love You 'Cause I Have To" (2003)	"Godhopping" (2004)	""I Love You 'Cause I Have To" (re-issue)" (2004)

"Godhopping" is a pop rock song performed by British band Dogs Die in Hot Cars, released as the first single from their debut album, Please Describe Yourself and their second single overall. Written by lead singer and guitarist Craig Macintosh, and produced by Clive Langer and Alan Winstanley, the song was released on 25 May 2004 in the United Kingdom, with a worldwide release following. "Godhopping" reached number 24 on the UK Singles Chart. The song is driven by two very special and heavily syncopated piano riffs that seem to move fast against one another; lyrically, it is about people who change their religion according to what is fashionable.

== Track listings ==
CD single version 1

1. "Godhopping"
2. "Modern Woman" (BBC Radio One live session) (Craig Macintosh, Lee Smith)
3. "Eat Me Don't Eat Me" (original demo) (Macintosh)

CD single version 2

1. "Godhopping"
2. "Who Shot the Baby?" (Laurence Davey, Macintosh, Smith, Lee Worrall)
