= Flashback (1990 film) =

1990 American adventure comedy film

- Theatrical release poster
- Directed by: Franco Amurri
- Written by: David Loughery
- Produced by: Marvin Worth
- Starring: Dennis Hopper; Kiefer Sutherland
- Cinematography: Stefan Czapsky
- Edited by: Carroll Timothy O'Meara
- Music by: Barry Goldberg
- Distributed by: Paramount Pictures
- Release date: February 2, 1990 (United States)
- Running time: 107 minutes
- Country: United States
- Language: English
- Box office: $6,488,144 (US)

Flashback is a 1990 American adventure comedy film starring Dennis Hopper, Kiefer Sutherland, and Carol Kane. The film is written by David Loughery and directed by Franco Amurri.

== Plot ==
Huey Walker is a hippie and a former New Left radical (in the vein of Abbie Hoffman) who has been on the run from the law for 20 years for something he did not do: disconnecting Spiro Agnew's train car in Spokane, Washington. John Buckner is an FBI agent who is set to transport Walker back to Spokane for trial. Their journey forces them to cross paths with a corrupt Sheriff Hightower and the two end up fleeing for their lives. As the story progresses, it is revealed that Buckner was raised on a communal farm and that his given name is Free. As Buckner learns to reconcile his past with his present, Walker does as well.

== Cast ==
- Dennis Hopper as Huey Walker
- Kiefer Sutherland as Free "John" Buckner
- Carol Kane as Maggie
- Paul Dooley as Stark
- Cliff De Young as Sheriff Rand Hightower
- Richard Masur as Barry
- Michael McKean as Hal Cresciman
- Kathleen York as Sparkle
- Jean Gilpin as Elizabeth

== Production ==
Several scenes were filmed in Colorado, including the 16mm home movie sequence at Cattle Creek Canyon in Glenwood Springs, and the Glenwood train station for the fictional station in “Marsden, OR.” Interiors for the train were filmed on sets in a Denver warehouse and there were action sequences filmed in the area of La Veta, Colorado. Colorado billionaire, Philip Anschutz helped produce the film through his ventures, and also owned the Denver & Rio Grande Western and Southern Pacific railroads, providing the film’s locations. Shooting also took place in San Francisco.

== Reception ==
The film received mixed reviews.

Vincent Canby in The New York Times stated,

About 30 minutes before it's over, Flashback begins to go to pieces, like someone who has overdosed on carrot juice and organic marzipan. The movie becomes woozy and sort of distraught. Until then, it's an engaging comedy about the confrontation of a superannuated flower child of the 1960s and a 26-year-old representative of the clean-shaven, cholesterol-conscious, fiercely conservative 1980s.

The Los Angeles Times critic Peter Rainer stated:

In "Flashback" (citywide), the casting of Dennis Hopper as an Abbie Hoffman-like radical prankster is weirdly dislocating. Still primarily identified with "Easy Rider," Hopper is the shaggy archetype of '60s hippie anomie. [...] Despite his scraggly derelict's appearance and screw-loose antics, he is wised-up and politically right on. He is, God help us, the conscience of the '60s. And that's where the dislocation comes in. Hopper represents the fringes of hippiedom for us, yet his character here is also being promoted as a robust politico—an Abbie Hoffman in Rip Van Winkle drag.

Remarked Roger Ebert,

I've heard people complaining recently that once you've seen the coming attractions trailer for a movie, you've seen the movie. That's the way I felt after seeing the trailer for Franco Amurri's Flashback, but the film itself is a pleasant surprise - deeper and more original than the formula that the trailer seems to promise.

The then-new Entertainment Weekly magazine gave the film a B+, stating:

Ever since the mythic ’60s ended, countercultural idealists have been grappling with the loss of what they believed would be their eternal youth. Considering how many serious books and movies have addressed the aging of the Woodstock generation, it’s surprising to find Flashback, a seemingly insubstantial film that has something important to say on the subject. [...] Screenwriter David Loughery cleverly builds this simple role reversal into an affecting vehicle for exploring identity and growth. Against all odds, the movie manages to avoid easy caricatures. [...] Unlike many such voyages through the past, this is one ’60s trip that’s worth repeating.

Based on 16 reviews, the film has a score of 44% on Rotten Tomatoes.

=== Box office ===
The film debuted at number 5.

== Soundtrack ==
The film's soundtrack is made up of a mix of 1960s and 1980s alternative music. The theme song "Free" by the band Big Audio Dynamite is only available on this soundtrack; it was never included in any Big Audio Dynamite album, although the single edit appears on their compilation Planet B.A.D.. A remake of the song, titled "Kickin' In", was later recorded by Big Audio Dynamite II and included on the Kool-Aid album. The film itself (though not the soundtrack album) includes two other Big Audio Dynamite songs, "The Bottom Line" and "C'mon Every Beatbox."

Bob Dylan's version of Curtis Mayfield's "People Get Ready" is also only available on this soundtrack; to date, it has not been released in any Dylan album or any of his many box sets or Bootleg Series releases, although a different version Dylan recorded in 1975 is available on iTunes as a bonus track on Bob Dylan: The Collection.

Track Listing

1. "Free" – Big Audio Dynamite
2. "Fatal Attraction (And It's So Strange...)" – The Ultraviolets
3. "Next Time (I'll Dream of You)" – Flesh for Lulu
4. "Walk on the Wild Side" – Edie Brickell & New Bohemians
5. "It's the End of the World as We Know It (And I Feel Fine)" – R.E.M.
6. "People Get Ready" – Bob Dylan
7. "On the Road Again" – Canned Heat
8. "Born to Be Wild" – Steppenwolf
9. "Comin' Back to Me" – Jefferson Airplane
10. "All Along the Watchtower" – Jimi Hendrix
