= I Love You 'Cause I Have To =

- CD single 1, US CD2

Single by Dogs Die in Hot Cars

from the album Please Describe Yourself
- B-side: "Please Describe Yourself"; "Lightness in Weight"; "Celebrity Sanctum"; "Somewhat Off the Way"; "Queen of Pumpkin Plukes"; "Nobody Teaches Life Anything"; "Godhopping"
- Released: 2003 (original)
- Genre: Ska, new wave
- Length: 2:48
- Label: Radiate (2003); V2 (main)
- Songwriter: Craig Macintosh
- Producers: Clive Langer, Alan Winstanley

Dogs Die in Hot Cars singles chronology
"I Love You 'Cause I Have To" (2003)	"Godhopping" (2004)

Dogs Die in Hot Cars singles chronology
"Godhopping" (2004)	"I Love You 'Cause I Have To" (2004)	"Lounger" (2004)

Alternative cover

"I Love You 'Cause I Have To" is the debut single by British band Dogs Die in Hot Cars. It was initially released in 2003 alongside the tracks "Celebrity Sanctum" and "Somewhat Off the Way" on the label Radiate. The three-track release peaked at number 79 on the UK Singles Chart. Described as "mix of ska rhythms and new wave pop hooks" by AllMusic, "I Love You 'Cause I Have To" gained enough critical and commercial success to gain a recording contract with V2 Records, who re-released the song in 2004 after the band's second single "Godhopping". It was released in both the UK and international territories, and peaked on the UK Singles Chart at number 32 on the week of 17 July 2004, before dropping to number 67 the following week, then exiting the top 100. The song was written by band member Craig Macintosh, and produced by Clive Langer and Alan Winstanley, who also produced the debut album Please Describe Yourself.

== Track listings ==
CD single, US CD single 2

1. "I Love You 'Cause I Have To" – 2:48
2. "Please Describe Yourself" – 5:20 (Macintosh, Gary Smith, Lee Worrall)
3. "Godhopping music video"

International single "I Love You 'Cause I Have To, Pt. 1"

1. "I Love You 'Cause I Have To" – 2:47
2. "Lightness in Weight" – 2:22 (Macintosh)

US CD single 1

1. "I Love You 'Cause I Have To" – 2:33
2. "Celebrity Sanctum" – 4:44 (Macintosh)
3. "Somewhat Off the Way" – 3:43 (Macintosh)

Import CD

1. "I Love You 'Cause I Have To"
2. "Please Describe Yourself"
3. "Queen of Pumpkin Plukes"
4. "Nobody Teaches Life Anything"
5. "Godhopping"
