= Please Describe Yourself =

Studio album by Dogs Die in Hot Cars
- Released: 12 July 2004
- Recorded: 2002–2004
- Genres: Pop rock, alternative rock
- Length: 48:50
- Label: V2
- Producers: Clive Langer, Alan Winstanley

Dogs Die in Hot Cars chronology
Man Bites Man (2004)	Please Describe Yourself (2004)	Pop Nonsense

Singles from Please Describe Yourself
- 1. "Godhopping" Released: 25 May 2004; 2. "I Love You Cause I Have To" Released: 5 July 2004; 3. "Lounger" Released: 28 December 2004; 4. "Celebrity Sanctum" Released: 30 May 2005; 5. "Pastimes and Lifestyles" Released: 2005

Alternative cover
- American album cover

Please Describe Yourself is the only studio album by the British alternative rock band Dogs Die in Hot Cars. It was first released on 12 July 2004 in the United Kingdom on V2 Records. After releasing several limited-edition singles and the extended play Man Bites Man, the band released the album to critical praise.

The album reached number 44 on the UK Albums Chart, and was preceded by the singles "Godhopping" and "I Love You 'Cause I Have To" and "Lounger".

== Background and conception ==
Dogs Die in Hot Cars were formed when secondary school pupils Craig Macintosh (lead vocals, guitar), Gary Smith (vocals, guitar), Lee Worrall (bass) and Laurence Davey (drums) met whilst attending Madras College in St Andrews, Scotland. The band practiced in Davey's basement, slowly graduating from Nirvana cover versions to original songs. After practicing in Wormit, Fife, the band relocated to Glasgow, adding Ruth Quigley (keyboard, vocals) as the final member. The band released their first single "I Love You ’Cause I Have To" on label Radiate, along with "Celebrity Sanctum" and "Somewhat Off The Way." The three-track release peaked at number 79 on the UK Singles Chart. Described as "mix of ska rhythms and new wave pop hooks" by Allmusic, "I Love You 'Cause I Have To" gained enough critical and commercial success to gain a recording contract with V2 Records, and an EP titled Man Bites Man was released by the band in 2004, including the album track "Pastimes & Lifestyles."

The band embarked on an extensive promotional tour, including the British Glastonbury Festival and T in the Park, as well as supporting Eskimo Joe on several dates in Australia.

Macintosh has said of the album title,

"[...] part of the reason why we decided to call the album Please Describe Yourself [is because] it's like those dating channels: everybody goes, 'from London, happy-go-lucky'; nobody says, 'I’m a manic depressive', or 'I think I’m indescribable'. So we’re kind of throwing the question back."

Macintosh has said that they wanted "to write tunes where the song would reach its conclusion and you might even want to play it again" on the record. He also spoke of their willingness to record songs that were "big already" and did not need guitar solos, or what he described as "the new guitar solo" – rap.

== Music ==
=== Style ===
"Variously hailed as the new Dexy’s, XTC, Joe Jackson or Talking Heads, the band ... found themselves bracketed with Franz Ferdinand as leaders of art-rock’s 'new Jock revolution'."

— Dan Cairns, The Times

Please Describe Yourself takes influence from a wide variety of genres. One article in The Times said "Dogs Die don’t slot into any one musical genre — their forthcoming album, Please Describe Yourself, covers everything from ska to summer pop to Talking Heads-type rock", while another said "Please Describe Yourself ... changes styles so often that it’s hard to keep up. The thread is that all ten tracks are catchy, quirky pop-rock with clever, slightly off-kilter lyrics that tend to take a dig at modern living." The New York Times described the band's style on the album as "XTC-meets-Dexy's Midnight Runners sound." However, the band have claimed that they do not list them as an influence, as "none of us has ever owned a single Dexys record." Heather Phares of Allmusic stated that "Instead of just beating one style into the ground, on Please Describe Yourself Dogs Die in Hot Cars mine the past of British pop but find relatively fresh ways of rediscovering it."

Australian newspaper The Age called Craig Mactintosh's vocal delivery "biting social observations in a BBC-friendly accent." Macintosh responded by noting that he was "frustrated with singers who slurred their words and made it hard to make out what they were saying. I've got things I want to say", adding that he wanted people to understand the lyrics that mean something to him.

=== Songs and singles ===
Lyrically, "Godhopping", the opening track, is about people who change their religion according to what is fashionable. It was released as the album's lead single on 25 May 2004 in the UK. Described as "a jauntily piano-driven slip of white funk" by The Independent, the song reached number 24 on the UK Singles Chart, their highest-charting song to date. Speaking of the song's minor success, Lee Worral noted that "It was 17 midweek, so we were like, 'Wow, we could be on Top of the Pops!' But obviously, later on in the week all the kids get their pocket money and go out and buy Britney Spears or whatever. So 24 was great. See if we can better it with the next one."

According to The Independent, the second song on the album, "Lounger", is "a song about an overeducated, lazy bohemian" with lyrics such as "I get up when I want/Don't have to eat my greens/Or keep my bedroom tidy" guaranteed to appeal to students. The song was called the album's "telling moment" by Pitchfork Media, whilst Stylus said that it "fizzes along like no-one’s business, guitar on super-jangle and piano set to hyper-jaunty." It was released as the album's third single, and reached a peak of 43 on the UK Singles Chart. It was the last Dogs Die in Hot Cars single to chart.

The third song and second single from the album is titled "I Love You 'Cause I Have To."

"Celebrity Sanctum", both the fourth track and fourth single from the album, according to Gareth Dobson of Drowned in Sound, is "a song about vicarious love and image obsession." Dobson called the song, which namechecks celebrities such as Lucy Liu and Catherine Zeta-Jones, "a moving sense of ennui rather than attempting to play it for laughs", whilst The Age said that "[Cameron is] losing himself in the thrall of icon obsession."

The final single was "Pastimes and Lifestyles." Described as "the closest the band gets to a fashionably post-punk style."

== Critical reception ==
Professional ratings
Review scores
Source	Rating
Allmusic	4/5 stars
Drowned in Sound	(9/10)
entertainment.ie	4/5 stars
The Independent	2/5 stars
MusicOMH	(positive)
Pitchfork Media	(6.3/10)
Stylus	C+

Please Describe Yourself was critically well received. Allmusic's Heather Phares said: "on Please Describe Yourself Dogs Die in Hot Cars mine the past of British pop but find relatively fresh ways of rediscovering it", whilst Gareth Dobson, giving the album nine out of ten, noted that "rarely does a debut record offer such assuredness, consistency and creative quality." Dobson went on to say "Please Introduce Yourself is the best indie record of the year bar none, for no other band has successfully mixed playful and serious, novel and attention grabbing and hip and super uncool as much as this has." David Peinser of Rolling Stone placed the album at number four on his list of the top ten best albums of 2004, saying: "[The] Scottish five-piece makes a buoyant pop album that nods to a bunch of bands you never knew you missed."

William Swygart of Stylus drew attention to the "frustratingly flimsy feel" of the album, calling it "that of a band that think they’re much better than they really are." However, Swygart went on to acknowledge the "genuinely enjoyable moments", noting that it was the band's first album. Andy Gill of The Independent called it "an oddly hollow experience."

== Chart performance ==
Please Describe Yourself debuted and peaked on the UK Albums Chart at number 44 on the week of 24 July 2004. The album dropped to number 71 the following week before exiting the Top 100.

== Track listing ==
All songs written by Craig Macintosh, except where noted.

British version (V2, #1027142)
No.	Title	Writer(s)	Length
1.	"Godhopping"		2:43
2.	"Lounger"	Macintosh, Gary Smith	2:46
3.	"I Love You 'Cause I Have To"		2:46
4.	"Celebrity Sanctum"		4:50
5.	"Somewhat Off the Way"		3:30
6.	"Apples & Oranges"	Macintosh, Smith	3:48
7.	"Modern Woman"		3:41
8.	"Paul Newman's Eyes"		3:26
9.	"Pastimes & Lifestyles"		3:41
10.	"Glimpse at the Good Life"	Macintosh, Smith	3:22

US edition bonus track (V2, #63881-27204-2)
No.	Title	Writer(s)	Length
11.	"Who Shot the Baby?" ("Godhopping" B-side)	Laurence Davey, Macintosh, Smith, Lee Worrall	5:27

== Personnel ==
Production

- Dogs Die in Hot Cars – Arranger
- Clive Langer – Producer
- Alan Winstanley – Producer

Dogs Die in Hot Cars

- Craig Macintosh
- Gary Smith
- Lee Worrall
- Ruth Quigley
- Laurence Davey

Design

- Steve Crichton – Images
- Craig Macintosh – Design
- Eddie Martin – Design, Images
- Pete Martin – Images
- Elizabeth Ogilvie – Images
- Perou – Images

== Release history ==
Region	Release date	Format(s)	Catalogue	Label
United Kingdom	12 July 2004	CD	1027142	V2
Japan	22 September 2004	CD, DI	2197	V2
Japan	27 September 2004	CD (with bonus tracks)	2194	V2
Russia	27 September 2004	CD	82876 65161 2	BMG Russia
United States	26 October 2004	CD	63881-27204-2	V2
Australia	2004	CD	1027142	Festival Mushroom
