= Man Bites Man =

Man Bites Man EP

EP by Dogs Die in Hot Cars
- Released: 16 February 2004
- Genre: Alternative rock
- Length: 13:10
- Label: V2
- Producer: Various Producers

Dogs Die in Hot Cars chronology
Man Bites Man EP (2004)	Please Describe Yourself (2004)

The Man Bites Man EP was a CD containing 4 tracks that was used to promote Dogs Die in Hot Cars, who were at the time working on their debut album: Please Describe Yourself. The release was limited to 1,000 copies. The third track on this CD was used in an advertising campaign for Boots. Also, the recording of "Pastimes & Lifestyles" found on this EP is different from that of the version found on their debut - the most notable difference being that the bridge before the last chorus on this version is longer.

Clive Langer and Alan Winstanley (who produced the band's debut album) produced the first track on this CD, while Paul Tipler produced tracks 2 and 4, and track 3 was produced by Craig Macintosh - the band's lead singer. Macintosh uploaded many of the band's tracks to SoundCloud.

== Track listing ==
1. "Man Bites Man" - 3:41
2. "Queen of Pumpkin Plukes" - 3:07
3. "Nobody Teaches Life Anything" - 2:19
4. "Pastimes & Lifestyles" - 4:03
