= No. 10, Upping St. =

Studio album by Big Audio Dynamite
- Released: 27 October 1986
- Studio: Trident One (London)
- Genre: Alternative dance; new wave
- Length: 42:29 (Vinyl); 59:50 (CD)
- Label: CBS
- Producer: Mick Jones; Joe Strummer (Uncredited)

Big Audio Dynamite chronology
This Is Big Audio Dynamite (1985)	No. 10, Upping St. (1986)	Tighten Up Vol. 88 (1988)

Singles from No. 10, Upping St.
- 1. "C'mon Every Beatbox" b/w "Badrock City"; 2. "V. Thirteen (Remix)" b/w "Hollywood Boulevard (Remix)"; 3. "Sightsee M.C!" b/w "Another One Rides The Bus"

Professional ratings
Review scores
Source	Rating
AllMusic	4/5 stars
The Encyclopedia of Popular Music	3/5 stars
The Great Rock Discography	6/10
MusicHound	3.5/5
Q	4/5 stars
Record Mirror	4.5/5
The Rolling Stone Album Guide	4/5 stars
Smash Hits	8/10

No. 10, Upping St. is the second studio album by the English band Big Audio Dynamite, led by Mick Jones, the former lead guitarist and co-lead vocalist of the Clash. The album's title is a pun on 10 Downing Street, the residency and office of the prime minister of the United Kingdom. The album reunited Jones for one album with former Clash bandmate Joe Strummer, who was a co-producer of the album and co-writer of 5 of its 9 songs.

== Album artwork ==
The cover painting, based on a still taken from the Brian De Palma film Scarface (1983), was painted by Tim M Jones MA(RCA)

== Track listing ==
Side one
No.	Title	Writer(s)	Length
1.	"C'mon Every Beatbox"	Mick Jones; Don Letts	5:26
2.	"Beyond the Pale"	Joe Strummer; Jones	4:41
3.	"Limbo the Law"	Strummer; Jones; Dan Donovan	4:44
4.	"Sambadrome"	Jones; Letts	4:48

Side two
No.	Title	Writer(s)	Length
5.	"V. Thirteen"	Strummer; Jones	4:54
6.	"Ticket"	Strummer; Jones; Letts; Greg Roberts	3:28
7.	"Hollywood Boulevard"	Jones; Letts	4:29
8.	"Dial a Hitman"	Jones; Letts	5:04
9.	"Sightsee M.C!"	Strummer; Jones	4:55
Total length:			42:29

Bonus tracks
No.	Title	Writer(s)	Length
10.	"Ice Cool Killer" (bonus track on the UK and US CD)	Strummer; Jones; Donovan	5:33
11.	"The Big V" (bonus track on the UK and US CD)	Strummer; Jones; Donovan	4:48
12.	"Badrock City" (bonus track on the US CD)	Jones; Letts	7:00
Total length:			59:50

== Samples used on the album ==
- "Dial a Hitman" contains a spoken-word outro attributed to Matt Dillon and Laurence Fishburne (and with a reference to Jim Jarmusch)
- "C'mon Every Beatbox", "V. Thirteen", and "Sightsee M.C!" were all released as singles in the UK
- "C'mon Every Beatbox" contains samples from the films The Gang That Couldn't Shoot Straight (1971), The Harder They Come (1972), and The Cotton Club (1984)
- "Sambadrome" contains some samples from Brazilian football commentator Osmar Santos
- The original album version of "Hollywood Boulevard" opened with a sample of Peter O'Toole from My Favorite Year (1982)
- "Ice Cool Killer" is an instrumental version of "Limbo the Law"
- "The Big V" is an instrumental version of "V. Thirteen"
- "Badrock City" is an instrumental remix version of "C'mon Every Beatbox" and charted as a single on the US Dance Club Songs chart.
- "V. Thirteen" is named for the territorial tags drawn by members of Venice 13 (V13) is a Mexican-American street gang based in the Oakwood (a.k.a. "Ghost Town") neighborhood of Venice, a section of Los Angeles, California, with a substantial presence in East Venice as well as the Culver City/Los Angeles border, especially around Washington Blvd.
- Later pressings of the album substituted the original versions of "Hollywood Boulevard" and "V. Thirteen" with the remixed versions that were released as a single.

== Personnel ==
Credits are adapted from the No. 10, Upping St. liner notes.

Big Audio Dynamite

- Mick Jones — vocals, guitar, producer
- Don Letts — vocals, effects
- Dan Donovan — keyboards, vocals, photography, artwork
- Leo Williams — bass, vocals
- Greg Roberts — drums, vocals

with:

- Joe Strummer — producer
- Matt Dillon — dialog
- Laurence Fishburne — dialog
- Sipho Josanna Johnson — human beatbox
- Adam "Flea" Newman — "dynamite"
- Sam Sever — remixing; drum programming
- Chep Nuñez — editing
- Alan Moulder, Cenzo Townshend, Dennis Mitchell — assistant editing
- Paul "Groucho" Smykle — engineer
- Mark "Spike" Stent — assistant
- Josh Cheuse — photography

The cover painting, based on a still taken from the Brian De Palma crime drama film Scarface (1983) was painted by Tim Jones.
