= Campag Velocet =

English rock group

Campag Velocet were an English rock group, who were at their peak during the late 1990s.

== Career ==
Formed in London in early 1993, the band's musical style was influenced by bands such as Primal Scream, Public Image Ltd, Gang of Four, Spacemen 3, Public Enemy and at the time were lumped into an indie dance genre which then included bands such as Regular Fries. The name of the band is probably a reference to the Campagnolo groupset, and much of their artwork draws from road bicycle imagery. Another major influence in the Campag vocabulary and artwork is Nadsat, coined by Anthony Burgess in the book A Clockwork Orange. The single "Drencrom Velocet Synthmesc" uses Nadsat words for recreational drugs, with the text being shown in the opening frame of the A Clockwork Orange film.

The band's line-up was Pete Voss (vocals), Ian Cater (guitars, keyboards, programming), Barnaby "Barney" Slater (bass) and Lascelles Lascelle (drums, percussion, samples).

Campag Velocet released their debut album, Bon Chic Bon Genre in 1999, and released three singles off it, "To Lose La Trek", "Vito Satan" and "Drencrom [Velocet Synthmesc]", the latter of which was an NME magazine 'single of the week'. "Vito Satan" peaked at No. 75 in the UK Singles Chart in February 2000. The band was hailed as the 'best new band in Britain' by NME, appearing on the cover of the magazine during 1999 and playing on the NME Tour in 2000 (appearing above Coldplay in the lineup). They later suffered the same fate as some of the other bands to be pushed by the NME (such as Terris and Gay Dad) by losing their recording contract due to poor sales.

The band signed a new recording contract with the record label, Pointy Records, and in 2004, they released their second album, It's Beyond Our Control, featuring two singles "Who Are The Trumping Men" and "Ain't No Funki Tangerine", to mixed reviews.

Campag Velocet broke up in 2005. Voss formed a new band in 2006 called The Count. Pete Voss now owns his own belt company called Voss Belts.

== Discography ==
=== Albums ===
- Bon Chic Bon Genre (1999, PIAS Recordings)
- It's Beyond Our Control (2004, Pointy Records)

=== Singles ===
- "Dust It, Don't Bust It" / "Drencrom (Velocet Synthemesc)" (1997, Fierce Panda Records) (split single with Regular Fries)
- Drencrom EP (1997, Rabid Badger)
- "Sauntry Sly Chic" (1998, Rabid Badger)
- "To Lose La Trek" (1999, PIAS)
- "Bon Chic Bon Genre" (1999, PIAS)
- "Vito Satan" (2000, PIAS)
- "Vindictive Disco" (2004, Pointy)
- "Who Are The Trumping Men?" (2004, Pointy)
