= Dogs Die in Hot Cars =

Scottish band

- Origin: St. Andrews, Fife, Scotland
- Genres: Indie rock
- Years active: 1997–2006; 2008–2009
- Labels: V2 International
- Past members: Craig Macintosh; Gary Smith; Lee Worrall; Ruth Quigley; Ally JB Davey
- Website: dogsdieinhotcars.com

Dogs Die in Hot Cars was a Scottish band from St. Andrews, consisting of members Craig Macintosh (vocals, guitar), Gary Smith (vocals, guitar), Ruth Quigley (vocals, keyboards), Lee Worrall (bass and glockenspiel) and Laurence Davey (drums and percussion).

== History ==
Macintosh, Smith, Worrall and Davey all met at Madras College and began playing together in 1993 at the age of 14. After having performed under various names, they settled on "Dogs Die in Hot Cars" in 1997. In 1999 they moved to Glasgow where they met Ruth Quigley to complete the line up. The band listed their influences among others as Nirvana, Red Hot Chili Peppers, The Beatles and Talking Heads.

Later that year, the band signed a one-off single deal with EMI subsidiary label, Radiate Records. The single included the songs "I Love You 'Cause I Have To", "Celebrity Sanctum" and "Somewhat Off The Way". In the autumn of 2003, the band signed to V2 Records and Chrysalis Publishing.

In July 2004 they released their debut album Please Describe Yourself (Produced by Langer & Winstanley), which included the tracks "I Love You 'Cause I Have To", "Godhopping" and "Lounger". "Godhopping" peaked at No. 24 on the UK Singles Chart and remains the band's biggest hit. "I Love You 'Cause I Have To" peaked at No. 32 on the UK Singles Chart.

The song, "Nobody Teaches Life Anything" (found on the release in 2004 of Man Bites Man EP) was used for four years in television advertising campaign in the United Kingdom by Boots.

In 2006, following the departure of their guitarist Gary Smith, the band entered the studio to record their second album. However, during a break in the recording schedule, the remaining members decided to abandon the album.

In 2008, the band released seventeen demos that they had written for the second album, for people to remix and rewrite how they liked, with the intention being that of the best mixes for each song, they would compile a final record and share any potential royalties from it 50 to 50 with those who contributed. Following this, however, on their website it states that "the band felt there weren't enough mixes to warrant a release as just conclusion to the project and to the band".

== Band members ==
- Craig Macintosh (lead vocals, guitar)
- Gary Smith (guitar, backing vocals)
- Lee Worrall (bass, glockenspiel)
- Ruth Quigley (keyboards, backing vocals)
- Laurence Davey (drums, percussion)

== Discography ==
=== Studio albums ===
Title	Details	Peak chart positions			
Title	Details	UK	UK Indie	SCO	AUS
Please Describe Yourself	Released: 26 October 2004; Label: V2, Sony BMG; Formats: CS CD	44	3	17	82

=== Extended plays ===
Title	Details	Peak chart positions		
Title	Details	UK	UK Indie	SCO
Man Bites Man	Released: 16 February 2004; Label: V2; Formats: CD, LP	82	22	47

=== Singles ===
Title	Year	Peak chart positions					Album
Title	Year	UK	UK Indie	UK Rock	AUS	SCO	Album
"I Love You 'Cause I Have To"	2003	32	4	–	89	18	Please Describe Yourself
"Godhopping"	2004	24	2	–	–	9	Please Describe Yourself
"Lounger"	2004	43	3	5	–	34	Please Describe Yourself

=== Compilations ===
- Nano-Mugen Compilation (with "I Love You 'Cause I Have to", 2005)
- Teachers 4 (Soundtrack to the Channel 4 Television series) (with "Celebrity Sanctum", 2005)
- Keep Pop Loud (with "Beauty US", 2011)
