= V. Thirteen =

1987 single by Big Audio Dynamite

Single by Big Audio Dynamite

from the album No. 10, Upping St.
- Released: 9 February 1987
- Studio: Trident One (London)
- Genre: Alternative dance
- Length: 4:54
- Label: CBS
- Songwriters: Joe Strummer; Mick Jones
- Producers: Joe Strummer; Mick Jones

Big Audio Dynamite singles chronology
"C'mon Every Beatbox" (1986)	"V. Thirteen" (1987)	"Sightsee M.C!" (1987)

Music video
- "V. Thirteen" on YouTube

"V. Thirteen" is a song by the English band Big Audio Dynamite, released as both a 7" and 12" single from their second studio album, No. 10, Upping St. (1986). "V. Thirteen" was one of five tracks that former Clash lyricist and lead vocalist Joe Strummer co-wrote with Mick Jones on the album who also co-produced the album, including this single, with Jones. Following the disappointing sales of "C'mon Every Beatbox", "V. Thirteen" was released as the second single from the album, charting slightly higher by peaking at No. 49 on the UK singles chart, and No. 15 on Billboard's Dance Club Songs.

== Track listing ==
7" single

1. "V. Thirteen"
2. "Hollywood Boulevard (Remix)"
  - Remixed by Sam Sever

12" single

1. "V. Thirteen (Extended Remix)"
2. "Hollywood Boulevard (Club Mix)"
  - Remixed by Sam Sever
3. "Hollywood Boulevard (Dub Mix)"
  - Remixed by Sam Sever

== Chart performance ==
Chart	Position
UK singles chart	49
US Billboard Hot Dance Club Play chart	15

- "V. Thirteen" and "Hollywood Boulevard" charted together on the Billboard Hot Dance Club Play chart.
