= Regular Fries =

UK musical group

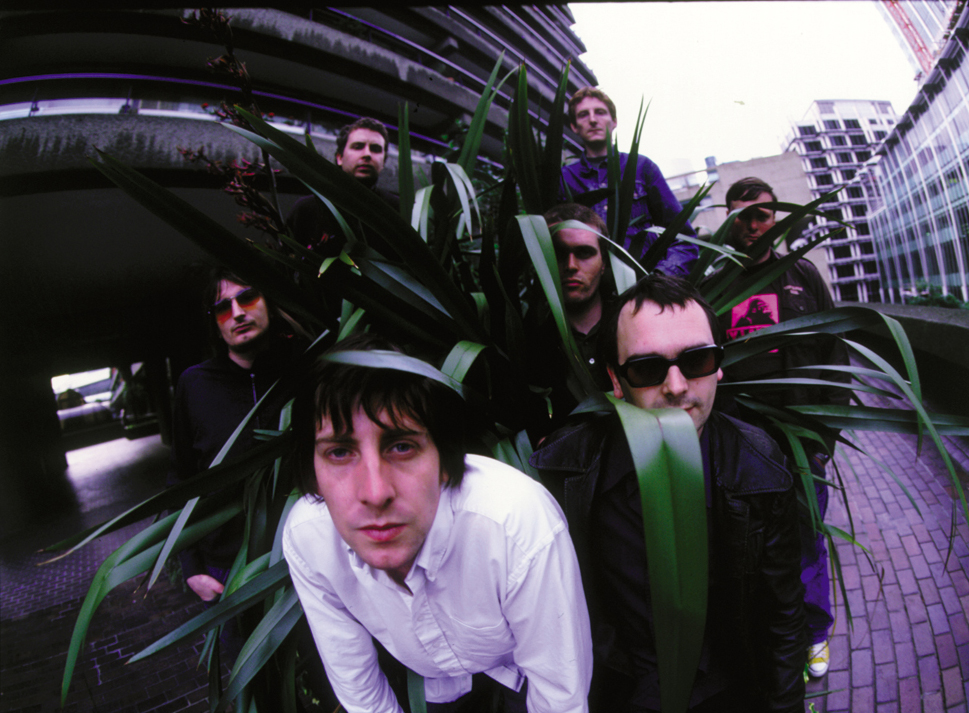
- Regular Fries, War on Plastic Plants, Barbican London

Background information
- Origin: London, England
- Genres: Indie rock, electronica, psychedelic rock, trip hop
- Years active: 1997–2001
- Members: Paul Moody; Andy Starke; Dave Brothwell; Rich Little; Will Beaven; Pat O'Sullivan; Stephen Griffin
- Past members: Ben Halton

Regular Fries were an English electronica/rock group. Their style was surreal and infused with the space age. Although chart success eluded them they received rave reviews in the music media from NME, Rolling Stone and Loaded, who were once moved to call them "the best rock'n'roll band in the world". On their split in March 2001, songwriter Paul Moody announced "We hate the charts and the charts hate us. We're off into the cosmos!".

== History ==
The band was formed in 1997 in North London by graphic designer Will Beaven (keyboards), music journalist Paul Moody (synthesizer, vibes), and film-maker Andy Starke (drums). The line-up was completed by Dave Brothwell (vocals), Rich Little (vocals, percussion), Pat O'Sullivan (bass), and Stephen Griffin (guitar). Sometimes regarded part of the "skunk rock" movement, the band became known for their extravagant live shows. After touring with the Lo Fidelity Allstars, the band's debut album, Accept the Signal, was released in 1999, followed the next year by War on Plastic Plants, which included a collaboration with Kool Keith on "Coke N Smoke (Supersonic Waves)". Their third and final album while together, Blueprint for a Higher Civilization, was released in 2001, the band splitting up the same year.

== Discography ==
=== Albums ===
- Accept the Signal (June 1999) JBO
- War on Plastic Plants (2000) JBO
- Blueprint for a Higher Civilisation (2001) Soft City/Sony
- Phone in Sick (Compilation) (2004)

=== Singles ===
- "Dust It, Don't Bust It" (1997) Fierce Panda (split 7-inch with Campag Velocet)
- "Dust It, Don't Bust It (full version)" 12-inch EP (1998) Rabid Badger
- Free The Regular Fries EP (September 1998) JBO
- Fries Entertainment EP (1998) JBO
- "King Kong" (June 1999) JBO
- "Dust It" (1999) JBO
- Smokin' Cigars with the Pharaohs EP (2000) JBO
- "Supersonicwaves" (2000) JBO
- "Eclipse" (2001) JBO (withdrawn)
- Transmissions From the War Office vol. 1 EP (2001) Soft City
- "Afrika" (2001) Soft City
