= C'mon Every Beatbox =

Single by Big Audio Dynamite

from the album No. 10, Upping St.
- Released: October 1986
- Studio: Trident One (London)
- Genre: Alternative dance
- Length: 5:26
- Label: CBS
- Songwriter(s): Mick Jones; Don Letts
- Producer(s): Joe Strummer; Mick Jones

Big Audio Dynamite singles chronology
"Medicine Show" (1986)	"C'mon Every Beatbox" (1986)	"V. Thirteen" (1987)

Music video
- "C'mon Every Beatbox" on YouTube

"C'mon Every Beatbox" is a song by the English alternative dance band Big Audio Dynamite, released as both a 7" and 12" single from their second studio album, No. 10, Upping St. (1986). Written by Mick Jones and Don Letts, "C'mon Every Beatbox" was released as the lead single from the album, peaking at No. 51 on the UK singles chart, and No. 19 on Billboard's Dance Club Songs. The single features the non-album track, "Badrock City" as its B-side, which was later included as a bonus track on the US CD of the No. 10, Upping St. album.

== Track listing ==
7" single

1. "C'mon Every Beatbox (Edit)"
2. "Badrock City"
3. *Mixed by Sam Sever

12" single

1. "C'mon Every Beatbox (Extended Vocal Version)"
2. "Badrock City"
3. "Beatbox's at Dawn"
4. *Mixed by Sam Sever

== Chart performance ==
Chart	Position
UK singles chart	51
US Billboard Hot Dance Club Play chart	16 ^{[A]}
US Billboard Hot Black Singles chart	66 ^{[B]}

- A "C'mon Every Beatbox and "Badrock City" charted together on the Billboard Hot Dance Club Play chart.
- B "Badrock City" charted at No. 66 on the Hot Black Singles chart.
