= Lounger (song) =

2004 single by Dogs Die in Hot Cars

Single by Dogs Die in Hot Cars

from the album Please Describe Yourself
- B-side: "Mandarins"; "Good Grief"
- Released: 28 December 2004
- Recorded: 2003
- Genre: Pop rock
- Length: 2:44
- Label: V2
- Songwriters: Craig Macintosh, Gary Smith
- Producers: Clive Langer and Alan Winstanley

Dogs Die in Hot Cars singles chronology
| "I Love You 'Cause I Have To" (2004) | "Lounger" (2004) | "Celebrity Sanctum" (2005) |

"Lounger" is a pop rock song performed by British band Dogs Die in Hot Cars, released as the third single from their debut album, Please Describe Yourself. It was written by lead singer and guitarist Craig Macintosh and band member Gary Smith, and, alongside the rest of the album, produced by Clive Langer and Alan Winstanley.

== Reception ==
According to The Independent, it is "a song about an overeducated, lazy bohemian" with lyrics such as "I get up when I want/Don't have to eat my greens/Or keep my bedroom tidy" guaranteed to appeal to students. The song was called the album's "telling moment" by Pitchfork Media, whilst Stylus said that it "fizzes along like no-one’s business, guitar on super-jangle and piano set to hyper-jaunty." It reached a peak of 43 on the UK Singles Chart, thereby becoming the last Dogs Die in Hot Cars single, and indeed release, to chart.

== Track listing ==
UK CD single 1

1. "Lounger" – 3:40

UK CD single 2

1. "Lounger" – 3:40
2. "Mandarins" – 4:50

International CD single

1. "Lounger" – 3:40
2. "Mandarins" – 4:50
3. "Good Grief"

7" picture disc

1. "Lounger" – 3:38
2. "Lounger" (A cappella) – 3:39
