= The Globe (song) =

Single by Big Audio Dynamite II

from the album The Globe
- Released: December 12, 1991
- Recorded: 1990/1991
- Genre: Alternative dance
- Length: 3:50 (single edit); 6:04 (album version)
- Label: Columbia
- Songwriters: Mick Jones; Gary Stonadge
- Producers: Mick Jones; Andre Shapps

Big Audio Dynamite II singles chronology
"Rush" (1991)	"The Globe" (1991)	"Innocent Child" (1992)

"The Globe" is a song by the English electronic group Big Audio Dynamite II. It was released as a single in the United States and is taken from their sixth album, The Globe (1991). It samples the 1981 song "Should I Stay or Should I Go" (which was written by Big Audio Dynamite II singer Mick Jones during his tenure with the Clash) and Lionel Richie's 1983 single, "All Night Long (All Night)".

The song spent 10 weeks on the US Billboard Hot 100, peaking at No. 72 in March 1992.

== Music video ==
A music video for the single edit of the song was released in 1991 through Sony BMG Music Entertainment. It was directed by Nic Hofmeyr and Ralph Ziman. The video features the band playing at the Crossroads of the World tower in Los Angeles, inter-spliced with stock footage of the city, its nightlife and scenery, and a recording of the band performing on stage.

== Track listing ==
1. "The Globe" (Single Edit) – 3:50
2. "The Globe" (Single Remix Edit) – 4:05 *
3. "The Globe" (12" Mix) – 7:42 *
4. "The Globe" (Dub Version) – 5:43 *
5. "The Globe" (By The Orb) – 9:22 **
6. "The Globe" (Instrumental) – 4:54 ***
- * Remix by Danny Rampling, Engineer: Marcus Draws, Programmer: Andy Whitmore, Percussion: Joe Beckett.
- ** Remix and additional production by The Orb.
- *** Mixed by Mick Jones and Andre Shapps.

== Personnel ==
- Mick Jones – vocals
- Nick Hawkins – guitars
- Gary Stonadge – bass guitar
- Chris Kavanagh – drums

== Charts ==
=== Weekly charts ===
Chart (1991–1992)	Peak Position
Australia (ARIA)	8
New Zealand (Recorded Music NZ)	10
US Billboard Hot 100	72
US Hot Dance Club Play (Billboard)	28
US Modern Rock Tracks (Billboard)	3
US Cash Box Top 100	51

=== Year-end charts ===
Chart (1992)	Position
Australia (ARIA)	66

== Certifications ==
Certifications and sales for "The Globe"
Region	Certification	Certified units/sales
Australia (ARIA)	Gold	35,000^{^}
^{^} Shipments figures based on certification alone.
