= Rush (Big Audio Dynamite II song) =

1991 single by Big Audio Dynamite II

Single by Big Audio Dynamite II

from the album The Globe
- B-side: "City Lights"
- Released: June 1991
- Length: 4:17 (album version); 3:11 (7-inch version)
- Label: Columbia
- Songwriter: Mick Jones
- Producers: Mick Jones; Andre Shapps

Big Audio Dynamite II singles chronology
"Free" (1990)	"Rush" (1991)	"The Globe" (1991)

Music video
- "Rush" on YouTube

"Rush" is a song by the English band Big Audio Dynamite II from their fifth studio album, The Globe (1991). A longer version of "Rush", entitled "Change of Atmosphere", had previously appeared on the group's 1990 album Kool-Aid.

The song samples several musical recordings, including the keyboard component of the Who's song "Baba O'Riley", the organ from the introduction to the Deep Purple song "Child in Time", a drum break from Tommy Roe's "Sweet Pea", drums and guitars from a break in Pigmeat Markham's "Here Comes the Judge", a line from the Sugarhill Gang's song "Rapper's Delight" where Big Bank Hank raps "a time to cry, a time to laugh", and a vocal sample from "You Keep Me Swingin'", from Peter Sellers' Songs for Swingin' Sellers. The shorter 7-inch version omits all the samples except for the "Baba O'Riley" keyboard and the "Sweet Pea" drums.

"Rush" was a number-one hit on the US Billboard Modern Rock Tracks chart for four weeks in 1991, becoming the chart's most successful hit of 1991, and it also topped the Australian and New Zealand singles charts. In the United Kingdom, "Rush" was originally released as the B-side to the 1991 re-release of the Clash's "Should I Stay or Should I Go". The A-side was popular due to its inclusion in a Levi Strauss & Co. advert, causing it to climb to number one on the UK singles chart. The sleeve art for the 7-inch and CD singles displayed the Clash on the front, and BAD II on the rear. The record label displays "Should I Stay or Should I Go" as side "A" and "Rush" as side "AA", making it effectively a double A-side release.

== Track listings ==
- UK 7-inch and cassette single
1. "Rush" (7-inch original version) – 3:11
2. "Rush" (New York remix) – 3:55
- UK 12-inch single
1. "Rush" (New York club mix) – 5:50
2. "Rush" (New York instrumental mix) – 5:51
3. "Rush" (New York 12-inch mix) – 7:57
4. "Rush" (7-inch original version) – 3:11
- UK CD single
1. "Rush" (7-inch original version) – 3:11
2. "Rush" (New York club mix) – 5:50
3. "Rush" (New York 12-inch mix) – 7:57
4. "City Lights" (full length) – 7:47
- US cassette single
1. "Rush" (edit)
2. "Kool-Aid"
- US 12-inch single

A1. "Rushdance" – 8:04
A2. "Rush" (club instrumental) – 9:08
B1. "Rush" (album version) – 4:17
B2. "City Lights" – 7:18

- US CD single
1. "Rush" (album version) – 4:17
2. "Rushdance" – 8:04
3. "City Lights" – 7:18
4. "Rush" (live) – 5:45
- Australian 12-inch, CD, and cassette single
1. "Rush"
2. "E=MC2"
3. "Medicine Show"

== Personnel ==
- Mick Jones – vocals, guitar
- Nick Hawkins – guitar
- Gary Stonadge – bass
- Chris Kavanagh – drums
- Andre Shapps – keyboards, sampling

== Charts ==
=== Weekly charts ===
Weekly chart performance for "Rush"
Chart (1991–1992)	Peak position
Australia (ARIA)	1
Canada Top Singles (RPM)	73
New Zealand (Recorded Music NZ)	1
UK Airplay (Music Week)	50
US Billboard Hot 100	32
US Alternative Airplay (Billboard)	1
US Dance Club Songs (Billboard)	36
US Mainstream Rock Airplay (Billboard)	40
US Cash Box Top 100	37

=== Year-end charts ===
1991 year-end chart performance for "Rush"
Chart (1991)	Position
Australia (ARIA)	16
US Modern Rock Tracks (Billboard)	1

1992 year-end chart performance for "Rush"
Chart (1992)	Position
New Zealand (RIANZ)	16

== Certifications ==
Certifications and sales for "Rush"
Region	Certification	Certified units/sales
Australia (ARIA)	Gold	35,000^{^}
New Zealand (RMNZ)	Gold	5,000^{*}
^{*} Sales figures based on certification alone.^{^} Shipments figures based on certification alone.

== See also ==
- List of number-one singles in Australia during the 1990s
- List of Billboard Mainstream Rock number-one songs of the 1990s
- List of number-one singles from the 1990s (New Zealand)
