= Nick Hawkins (musician) =

British musician (1965–2005)

Nick Hawkins (3 February 1965 – 10 October 2005) was a guitarist with Big Audio Dynamite II.

Hawkins, who was born in Luton, England, joined Big Audio Dynamite II in 1990, and went on to receive gold and platinum awards with the band for their hit singles, "Rush" and "The Globe". He left the band in 1997, but continued to write and produce music and moved to the United States. Hawkins scored for films as well as producing his wife, Jo Beng's debut album, which was released on his own record label, P-Phonic Records, distributed by Lightyear/WEA.

Hawkins died of a heart attack at the age of 40. At the time of his death Hawkins was living in Las Vegas, Nevada and working on a solo album entitled Dusk Till Dawn, which was originally due for release in 2006. Beng is currently in talks with PVibe Records regarding the release of that CD.
