= Chris Kavanagh (musician) =

British drummer

- Born: 4 June 1964 (age 62); Woolwich, London, England
- Genres: Alternative rock; post-punk; new wave; breakbeat
- Instrument: Drums
- Years active: 1982–present

Chris Kavanagh (born 4 June 1964) is a British drummer, best known for playing in Sigue Sigue Sputnik and Big Audio Dynamite II.

Kavanagh was asked to join Sigue Sigue Sputnik because of his looks and attitude, and only after that was taught to play drums by other band members. He remained with them until 1989. Later he joined Big Audio Dynamite II after Mick Jones reshuffled the line-up completely. He left the band in 1995.
