= Big Audio Dynamite =

British musical group

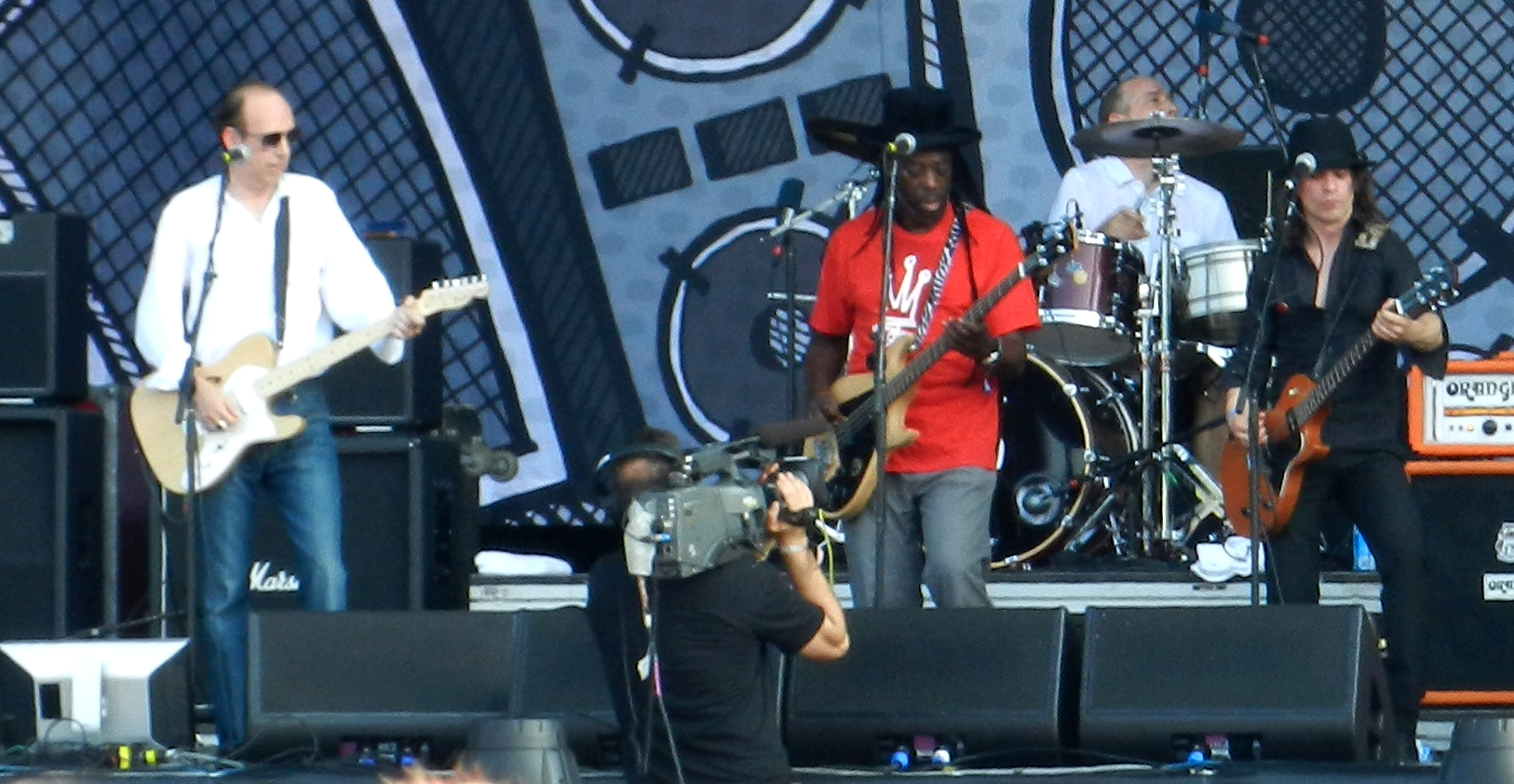
- Big Audio Dynamite performing live at Lollapalooza at Grant Park in Chicago, August 2011

Background information
- Also known as: BAD
- Origin: London, England
- Genres: Post-punk; alternative dance; dance-rock; funk rock; dance-punk; hip-hop; reggae fusion
- Works: Big Audio Dynamite discography
- Years active: 1984–1997; 2011
- Labels: Columbia; Radioactive; MCA
- Past members: Mick Jones; Don Letts; Dan Donovan; Leo Williams; Greg Roberts; Nick Hawkins; Gary Stonadge; Chris Kavanagh; Andre Shapps; Michael 'Zonka' Custance; Daryl Fulstow; Bob Wond; Ranking Roger

Big Audio Dynamite (later known as Big Audio Dynamite II and Big Audio, and often abbreviated to BAD) were an English band formed in London in 1984 by Mick Jones, former lead guitarist and co-lead vocalist of the Clash. The band mixed various musical styles, incorporating elements of punk rock, dance music, hip-hop, reggae, and funk. After releasing a number of well-received studio albums and touring extensively during the 1980s and 1990s, Big Audio Dynamite broke up in 1997. In 2011 the band embarked on a reunion tour.

== History ==
=== T.R.A.C. (1984) ===
After being fired from the Clash in 1983 and following a brief stint with new wave band General Public, Mick Jones formed a new band called Top Risk Action Company (T.R.A.C.). He recruited bassist Leo "E-Zee Kill" Williams, saxophonist John "Boy" Lennard (from post-punk band Theatre of Hate), and former Clash drummer Topper Headon. Headon was quickly fired for his heroin addiction and Lennard either left or was fired and the band folded. Although the band released no material (only demos were recorded, which have yet to be officially released), T.R.A.C. can be seen as a forerunner to Big Audio Dynamite in much the same way that London SS can be seen as an early incarnation of the Clash.

=== Big Audio Dynamite (1984–1990) ===
Jones then formed Big Audio Dynamite with film director Don Letts (maker of the 1978 film The Punk Rock Movie, various Clash music videos, and later the Clash documentary Westway to the World in 2000), bassist Leo Williams (from T.R.A.C.), drummer Greg Roberts, and keyboardist Dan Donovan. In November 1985 the band's debut studio album, This Is Big Audio Dynamite, was released. The album's cover shows the band as a four-piece, minus Donovan who took and designed the photograph.

1986's No. 10, Upping St. reunited Jones for one last album with former Clash lyricist and lead vocalist Joe Strummer, who was credited with co-producing the album and co-writing five of its nine tracks. BAD supported Irish rock band U2 on their Joshua Tree Tour on certain dates, then released 1988's Tighten Up Vol. 88 and 1989's Megatop Phoenix. Tighten Up Vol. 88 contained "Just Play Music!", which was the second No. 1 single on Billboard's Modern Rock Tracks chart.

In 1990, the original line-up wrote and recorded the song "Free" for the soundtrack to the adventure comedy film Flashback, starring Dennis Hopper and Kiefer Sutherland. This would be the final song written with the original line-up, as the band would break up shortly after. "The Bottom Line" from the band's first album was remixed and used as the title track for Flashback. While the track was not included on the film's official soundtrack, it can be found on the 12" or by download. Later in 1990, Jones debuted Big Audio Dynamite II and released the UK-only studio album Kool-Aid. Keyboardist Dan Donovan remained in BAD II for one song, a re-working of the final BAD track "Free" renamed "Kickin' In".

=== Big Audio Dynamite II (1991–1993) ===
For 1991's The Globe, only Jones remained from the original incarnation of Big Audio Dynamite, and the band was now called "Big Audio Dynamite II". This new line-up featured two guitarists. The album sleeve was designed by Shawn Stussy. The Globe (1991) featured the band's most commercially successful single, "Rush", which hit No. 1 on both the US Modern Rock Tracks chart and the Australian National ARIA Chart. "Rush" was also released in the United Kingdom with the 1991 re-release of the Clash's "Should I Stay or Should I Go". The sleeve art for the 7-inch and CD singles displayed the Clash on the front, and BAD II on the rear with the record label displaying "Should I Stay or Should I Go" as side "A" and "Rush" as side "AA". Even though it was effectively a double A-side release, the Chart Information Network/Gallup decided that only the Clash would be credited with a number one hit. "Innocent Child" and "The Globe" were also released as singles.

BAD supported U2 on their Zoo TV Tour, headlined the MTV 120 Minutes tour which also featured Public Image Ltd, Live, and Blind Melon, and released the live EP "On the Road Live '92".

In 1991, while Jones formed Big Audio Dynamite II, the rest of the original line-up briefly formed a band called Screaming Target. They released one studio album Hometown Hi-Fi and two singles "Who Killed King Tubby?" and "Knowledge N Numbers" before disbanding. The title and album cover art were purposely meant as a tribute to Jamaican reggae deejay Big Youth's debut studio album Screaming Target (1972).

In 1993, Greg Roberts formed the electronic band Dreadzone with Tim Bran, with the name suggested to them by Don Letts. Bassist Leo Williams and keyboardist Dan Donovan joined the band before their second studio album Second Light and the single "Little Britain" in 1995. Dreadzone is still active, with Roberts and Williams remaining members.

=== Big Audio (1994) ===
A promotional photo of Big Audio Dynamite in 1995

The band later recruited keyboardist Andre Shapps (co-producer of The Globe, brother of MP Grant Shapps and Mick Jones's cousin) and DJ Michael "Lord Zonka" Custance as DJ and vocalist. Both appeared on the band's seventh studio album Higher Power (1994), which was released under the shortened name "Big Audio".

=== Final years and subsequent activities (1995–2010) ===
After signing a recording contract with Gary Kurfirst's Radioactive Records in 1995, the band reverted to the original "Big Audio Dynamite" moniker and released their least successful studio album to date, F-Punk (1995).

Radioactive Records refused to release the next proposed BAD studio album, Entering a New Ride. The line-up contained MC vocals by Joe Attard of Punks Jump Up, Ranking Roger of the Beat and General Public and drummer Bob Wond of Under Two Flags. In 1998, the band launched a new website, primarily intended as a means to distribute songs from the Entering a New Ride album. In 2001, after having only released 6 songs from the album, the website went down and Big Audio Dynamite disbanded. Their final studio album was never properly released in its entirety, but it has been heavily leaked online for fans who wished to hear it.

Since 2005, Jones has been working on a project with Tony James (formerly of Generation X and Sigue Sigue Sputnik) called Carbon/Silicon.

In early 2007, a live, eight-song DVD from BAD II was released; it is entitled Big Audio Dynamite Live: E=MC².

=== 2011 reunion ===
In 2010, Don Letts revealed to Billboard.com that he and Mick Jones broached the idea of a Big Audio Dynamite reunion in 2011. He explained, "I could lie to you and say 'Not in a million years', but... if Mick wasn't tied up with Gorillaz it might happen this year. (Jones) has looked at me and said, 'Maybe next year', but who knows. I've got to admit that in the past I'm not a great one for reformations; I always think if you're lucky in life, you get a window of opportunity, use it to the best of your ability and then fuck off and let someone else have their turn. But here I am 25 years down the line considering the thing". Besides a Big Audio Dynamite reunion, Letts said he was also hopeful for more Legacy Editions of the band's studio albums after finding more unreleased material—including live recordings—in the vaults. "There's definitely more stuff; whether Sony thinks it's worthwhile, that's another matter. But there seems to be a lot of respect for Big Audio Dynamite. Time has shown that a lot of the things we were dabbling in back then have come to manifest themselves today...so hopefully we'll get to do some more".

The reformation of the original line-up of BAD was confirmed on 25 January 2011 with the announcement of a UK tour. The 9-date tour was a commercial and critical success. The first of their two sold out Shepherd's Bush Empire shows received a 4-star review in The Times ('Not just a reformation - this is their time'), The Observer welcomed BAD's return with a glowing review declaring, 'they remain a joy'. Their headline slot at Beautiful Days festival was favourably reviewed on the Louder Than War music website.

Big Audio Dynamite played sets at the 2011 Outside Lands Music and Arts Festival, Coachella Valley Music and Arts Festival, Glastonbury Festival 2011, Rock en Seine and Lollapalooza.

== Members ==
=== Timeline ===
Big Audio Dynamite (1984–1990, 2011)

- Mick Jones – vocals, guitar
- Don Letts – vocals, samples
- Dan Donovan – keyboards, backing vocals
- Leo Williams – bass, backing vocals
- Greg Roberts – drums, backing vocals

Big Audio Dynamite II (1990–1993)

- Mick Jones – vocals, guitar
- Nick Hawkins – guitar, backing vocals
- Gary Stonadge – bass, backing vocals
- Chris Kavanagh – drums, backing vocals

Big Audio (1994–1995)

- Mick Jones – vocals, guitar
- Nick Hawkins – guitar, backing vocals
- Gary Stonadge – bass, backing vocals
- Chris Kavanagh – drums, backing vocals
- Andre Shapps – keyboards, programming, samples, percussion
- Michael 'Zonka' Custance – DJ, keyboards, samples, percussion, backing vocals

Big Audio Dynamite (1996–1998)

- Mick Jones – vocals, guitar
- Nick Hawkins – guitar
- Andre Shapps – keyboards, programming, samples, percussion
- Michael 'Zonka' Custance – DJ, keyboards, samples, percussion, gang vocals
- Daryl Fulstow – bass
- Bob Wond – drums
- Joe Attard – MC
- Ranking Roger – vocals

	Big Audio Dynamite (1984–1990)	Big Audio Dynamite II (1990–1993)	Big Audio (1994–1995)	Big Audio Dynamite (1996–1998)	Big Audio Dynamite (2011)
Mick Jones	vocals, guitar	vocals, guitar	vocals, guitar	vocals, guitar	vocals, guitar
Don Letts	vocals, samples				vocals, samples
Dan Donovan	keyboards, backing vocals				keyboards
Leo Williams	bass, backing vocals				bass
Greg Roberts	drums, backing vocals				drums, backing vocals
Nick Hawkins		guitar, backing vocals	guitar, backing vocals	guitar	
Gary Stonadge		bass, backing vocals	bass, backing vocals		
Chris Kavanagh		drums, backing vocals	drums, backing vocals		
Andre Shapps			keyboards, samples	keyboards, programming	
Michael 'Zonka' Custance			DJ, percussion, backing vocals	DJ, keyboards, samples	
Daryl Fulstow				bass	
Bob Wond				drums	
Joe Attard				MC	
Ranking Roger				vocals	

== Discography ==
- This Is Big Audio Dynamite (1985)
- No. 10, Upping St. (1986)
- Tighten Up Vol. 88 (1988)
- Megatop Phoenix (1989)
- Kool-Aid (1990)
- The Globe (1991)
- Higher Power (1994)
- F-Punk (1995)
- Entering a New Ride (1997)
