= Gary Stonadge =

British bass guitarist and DJ (born 1962)

Gary Stonadge (born 24 November 1962) is a British bass guitarist and DJ. He started playing in Mick Jones' band Big Audio Dynamite in 1989 when he changed the previous lineup completely and renamed it Big Audio Dynamite II. He left in 1995 after recording 5 albums with them. Since then, he concentrated on DJ sets, playing at clubs and bars mainly in New York and London. He is currently playing with Mick Jones in The Rotten Hill Gang. In January 1991, Gary's partner Cheryl Konteh gave birth to their daughter Femi Stonadge-Konteh.
