= Mick Jones (The Clash guitarist) =

British musician and singer (born 1955)

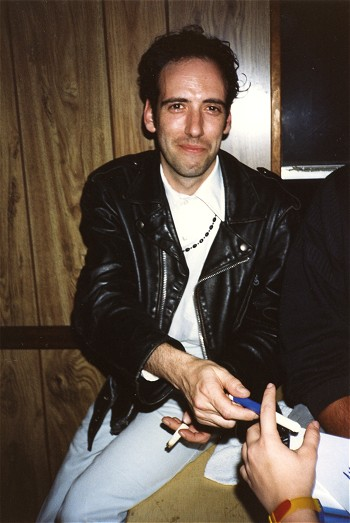
- Jones in New York City in 1987, during his stint with Big Audio Dynamite

Background information
- Born: Michael Geoffrey Jones; 26 June 1955 (age 71); Wandsworth, London, England
- Genres: Punk rock; post-punk; new wave; experimental rock; alternative rock
- Occupations: Musician; songwriter; singer; record producer
- Instruments: Guitar; vocals; keyboards
- Years active: 1975–present
- Labels: CBS; I.R.S.; Radioactive
- Member of: Carbon/Silicon
- Formerly of: The Clash; Rich Kids; General Public; Big Audio Dynamite; Gorillaz; London SS

Michael Geoffrey Jones (born 26 June 1955) is a British musician, singer, songwriter, and record producer best known as co-founder and lead guitarist of punk rock band the Clash, until his dismissal by frontman Joe Strummer in 1983. In 1984, he formed Big Audio Dynamite with Don Letts. Jones has played with the band Carbon/Silicon along with Tony James (formerly of Generation X and Sigue Sigue Sputnik) since 2002 and was part of the Gorillaz live band for a world tour in 2010. In late 2011, Jones collaborated with Pete Wylie and members of the Farm to form the Justice Tonight Band.

== Early life ==
Michael Geoffrey Jones was born on 26 June 1955 in Wandsworth, London, England, to a Welsh father, Tommy Jones, and a Russian Jewish mother, Renee Zegansky. He spent much of his early life living with his maternal grandmother, Stella Class, who was born in 1899 to Jewish parents in Russia and escaped the Russian pogroms by migrating to the United Kingdom. Jones' cousin is Grant Shapps, the former Conservative MP for Welwyn Hatfield. Jones went to Strand School in south London, and the West London School of Art (Chelsea College of Art), because "[he] thought that's how you get into bands and stuff".

But even before the [New York] Dolls, I used to follow bands around. I followed Mott the Hoople up and down the country. I'd go to Liverpool or Newcastle or somewhere—sleep on the Town Hall steps, and bunk the fares on the trains, hide in the toilet when the ticket inspector came around. I'd jump off just before the train got to the station and climb over the fence. It was great times, and I always knew I wanted to be in a band and play guitar. That was it for me.

— Mick Jones to Gibson Backstage Pass Holiday Double Issue 2006

He started gaining recognition as a guitarist in the early 1970s with his glam rock band, the Delinquents. A short time later, he met Tony James and formed the proto-punk band London SS. By 1976, that band had broken up and remaining members Jones, Paul Simonon and Keith Levene were seeking a new direction.

== Career ==
=== The Clash ===
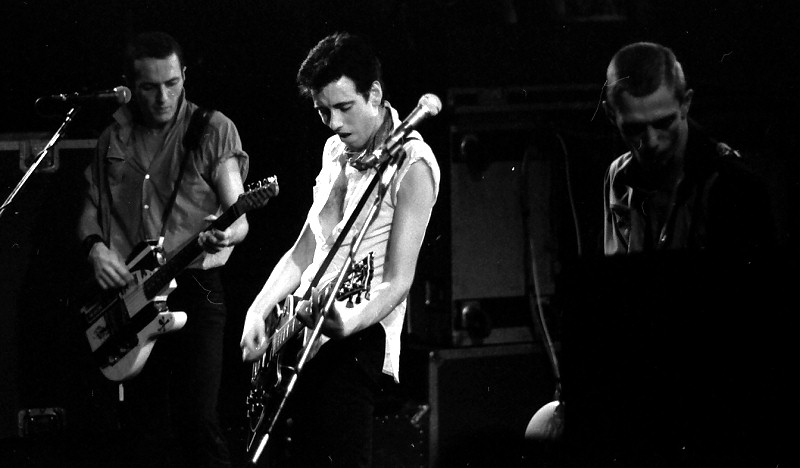
Jones (centre) performing live onstage with the Clash at Chateau Neuf in Oslo, Norway, 1980

When Jones was 21, he and Paul Simonon were introduced to Joe Strummer by Bernie Rhodes in a squat in Shepherd's Bush. The band rehearsed in a former railway warehouse in Camden Town and the Clash was formed. Jones played lead guitar, sang, and co-wrote songs for the band. One of the songs he wrote, "Train in Vain", was allegedly about Jones' relationship with Viv Albertine, guitarist of the Slits. Following the release of Combat Rock, the Clash were at the height of their popularity in 1983, but a "toxic" atmosphere had developed within the band. Jones wanted to take a break and rest, while Strummer and Simonon wished to take advantage of their recent success and continue working. Strummer later described Jones as having become "intolerable" to work with during this time, often failing to show up, and when he did, acting like "Elizabeth Taylor in a filthy mood." Meanwhile, the personal relationship between Jones and Simonon had deteriorated to the point they were not on speaking terms, with Simonon feeling the band had to fire Jones or break up. Strummer and Simonon fired him on 1 September 1983. Jones later expressed remorse for his behavior, stating, "I was just carried away really, I wish I had a bit more control." His departure marked "the beginning of the end" for the Clash, who released one poorly-received album without Jones then disbanded.

For his time with the Clash, Jones, along with the rest of the band, was inducted into the Rock and Roll Hall of Fame in 2003.

While promoting the band's 2013 box set, Sound System, which Jones says will be the final time he works on Clash music, he discussed the band reuniting prior to Strummer's death.

There were a few moments at the time I was up for it (Hall of Fame reunion in 2003), Joe was up for it. Paul wasn't. And neither, probably, was Topper Headon, who didn't wind up even coming in the end. It didn't look like a performance was going to happen anyway. I mean, you usually play at that ceremony when you get in. Joe had passed by that point, so we didn't. We were never in agreement. It was never at a point where all of us wanted to do it at the same time. Most importantly for us, we became friends again after the group broke up, and continued that way for the rest of the time. That was more important to us than the band.

In an October 2013 interview with BBC Radio 6 Music, Jones confirmed that Strummer did have intentions of a Clash reunion and in fact new music was being written for a possible studio album. In the months prior to Strummer's death, Jones and Strummer began working on new music for what he thought would be the next Mescaleros studio album. Jones said "We wrote a batch – we didn't use to write one, we used to write a batch at a time – like gumbo. The idea was he was going to go into the studio with the Mescaleros during the day and then send them all home. I'd come in all night and we'd all work all night." Jones said months had passed following their work together when he ran into Strummer at an event. Jones was curious as to what would become of the songs he and Strummer were working on and Strummer informed him that they were going to be used for the next Clash album.

=== General Public ===
After his expulsion from the Clash, Jones was a founding member of General Public, with vocalists Dave Wakeling and Ranking Roger of the Beat. Though he is listed in the credits of the band's 1984 debut studio album, All the Rage, as a member, Jones left General Public part way through the recording process and was replaced by Kevin White. White's picture appears on the back cover; Jones' picture does not. Jones did play guitar on many of the album's tracks, however, including the North American top 40 single "Tenderness".

=== Big Audio Dynamite ===
Leaving General Public behind, Jones formed Big Audio Dynamite in 1984 with film director Don Letts, who had directed various Clash music videos and later the Clash documentary Westway to the World (2000). The band's debut studio album, This Is Big Audio Dynamite, was released the following year, with the song "E=MC²" getting heavy rotation in dance clubs, and both singles, "Medicine Show" and "E=MC^{2}", charting in the UK.

For Big Audio Dynamite's second studio album, No. 10, Upping St. (1986), Jones reunited with Strummer. Together, the two wrote several songs on the album, including "Beyond the Pale", "V. Thirteen", and "Sightsee M.C!"; Strummer also co-produced the album. Their reunion did not last long, and following that collaboration, the two did not work together again for some time.

Big Audio Dynamite's third studio album, Tighten Up, Vol. 88 (1988), featured album cover art painted by ex-Clash bassist, Paul Simonon. Shortly following its release, Jones developed chickenpox and pneumonia, and spent several months in hospital. After his recovery, Jones released one more studio album with Big Audio Dynamite, Megatop Phoenix (1989), before reshuffling the line-up, renaming the band Big Audio Dynamite II and releasing The Globe (1991) album. The BAD II line-up had an international No. 1 hit with their song "Rush", topping the Billboard Modern Rock charts in the US and singles charts in Australia and New Zealand.

In 1990, Jones was featured on Aztec Camera's song "Good Morning Britain", with Roddy Frame.

The band's line-up was reshuffled again in 1994, and they released the studio album Higher Power (1994) under the name Big Audio. In 1995, a greatest hits album, Planet B.A.D., was released as well as a studio album called F-Punk under the original Big Audio Dynamite name. A further studio album, Entering a New Ride, was recorded in 1997, but was only released on the internet because of a disagreement with Radioactive Records, their then record label. One more "best of" collection, called Super Hits, was released in 1999.

Jones announced the reuniting of Big Audio Dynamite in January 2011, and they performed at the Lollapalooza music festival in 2011.

=== Carbon/Silicon ===
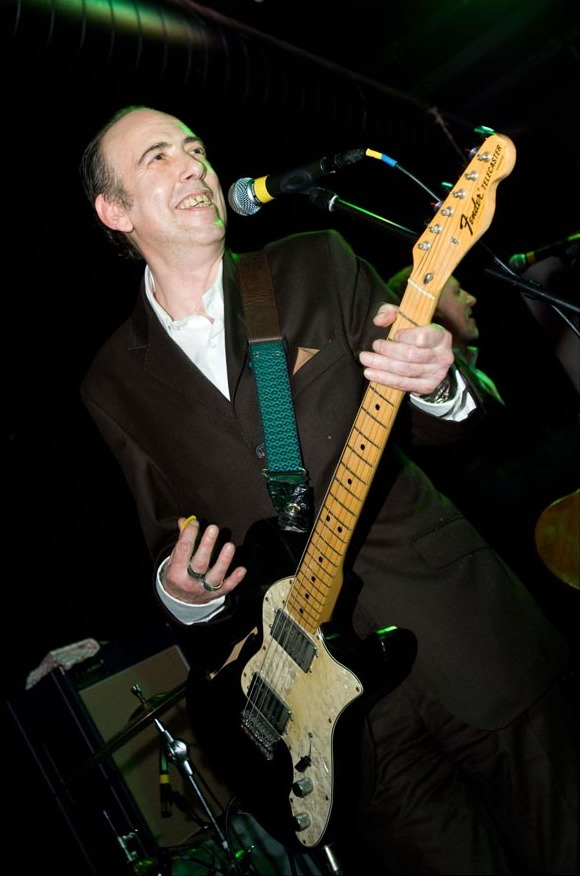
Jones performing live with Carbon/Silicon at the Carbon Casino VI event in London, 2008

In 2002, Jones teamed up with his former London SS colleague, Generation X and Sigue Sigue Sputnik member Tony James to form a new band named Carbon/Silicon. The band has toured the United Kingdom and the United States and has performed a number of anti-fascist benefit concerts; they have also recorded four studio albums: A.T.O.M (2006), Western Front (2006), The Crackup Suite (2007) and The Carbon Bubble (2009), which were available online for free. Their first physical CD release was The News EP. The band encourage their fans to share their music on P2P networks, and allow the audio and video taping of their shows. Their first song, "MPFree", is an anthem for P2P file sharing.

Similar in many respects to Jones' earlier work in Big Audio Dynamite, Carbon/Silicon aims to break the traditional approach to rock and roll. The band was described by Alan McGee as "...the Stones jamming with a laptop", and they make use of samples in their recordings and live shows. The formation of the band was catalysed by the internet and P2P file sharing. The first song written by Jones and James was entitled "MPFree", in which they expressed their willingness to embrace the technology of the internet and file sharing, in the interest of spreading music, rather than profit.

On seven consecutive Friday nights in January and February 2008 Carbon/Silicon played a series of gigs at the Inn on the Green, right under the Westway in Thorpe Close, between Ladbroke Grove and Portobello Road, London. As well as Carbon/Silicon there were many special guests, including appearances by Sex Pistols' Paul Cook and Glen Matlock, former Clash drummer Topper Headon and multi-instrumentalist and former Mescalero Tymon Dogg.

=== Producer ===
Jones has also been an occasional producer. In 1981, he produced Ellen Foley's second studio album, Spirit of St. Louis. Jones was in a relationship with Foley, and co-wrote songs for the album with Strummer and Tymon Dogg. Players on the album included members of the Blockheads, Tymon Dogg and all four members of the Clash.

In 1981, Jones co-produced Ian Hunter's studio album Short Back 'n' Sides with Mick Ronson. He also provided guitars and vocals for several songs on the release. In the same year, he produced Theatre of Hate's debut studio album, Westworld, released in 1982 and written by Kirk Brandon. Jones also played guitar on the title track, "Do You Believe in the Westworld". Jones would also record and produce Aria of the Devil in 1982 by Theatre of Hate at Wessex Studios, which did not get released until 1998, when the master tapes were found by Kirk Brandon.

Jones is also credited with contributing guitar and vocals to "Mal Bicho", the lead track of Los Fabulosos Cadillacs' tenth studio album, Rey Azucar (1995).

He produced the London-based band the Libertines' debut studio album, Up the Bracket (2002); Jones stayed on to produce the band's second studio album, The Libertines (2004). He also produced Down in Albion (2005), the debut studio album of former Libertines lead vocalist and guitarist Pete Doherty's subsequent band, Babyshambles.

He provided the score for Nick Mead's television film, Dice Life – the Random Mind of Luke Rhinehart (2004), a contemporary dance film created by Nick Mead and Wayne McGregor, featuring Luke Rhinehart, author of The Dice Man (1971).

At the NME Shockwave 2007 awards, Jones took to the stage and performed "(White Man) In Hammersmith Palais" with Primal Scream.

In 2014, he produced sibling band Kitty, Daisy & Lewis' third studio album, The Third (2015).

=== Gorillaz ===
Jones reunited with Simonon on the title track of Gorillaz's third studio album, Plastic Beach (2010): both of them performed in the Gorillaz live band supporting Plastic Beach (2010). The band headlined the 2010 Coachella Festival, Glastonbury Festival and Festival Internacional de Benicàssim. Jones later appeared on the Gorillaz's fourth studio album, The Fall (2010), on the track "Amarillo".

=== The Justice Tonight Band ===
In late 2011, Jones agreed to play songs by the Clash live again, collaborating with Pete Wylie and members of the Farm to form the Justice Tonight Band. The band formed with the aim of promoting awareness of the Hillsborough Justice Campaign. The Justice Tonight band have been joined onstage at different gigs by several other musicians sympathetic to the cause, including Billy Bragg and Paul Simonon. Shane MacGowan joined them onstage in Phoenix Park when the Justice Tonight Band supported the Stone Roses as part of their Reunion Tour on 5 July 2012.

=== Dreadzone ===
Jones reunited with ex-Big Audio Dynamite band members Greg Roberts and Leo Williams on Dreadzone's 2013 single "Too Late" from their album Escapades playing a guitar riff taken from Department S's single "Is Vic There?".

=== The Wallflowers ===
Jones collaborated with alternative rock group the Wallflowers as a guitarist and backing vocalist for two tracks on their sixth studio album, Glad All Over (2012).

=== Rachid Taha ===
Jones was a featured guest on Rachid Taha's ninth and final studio album, Zoom (2013), together with Brian Eno, and toured with Taha as part of the Zoom project.

=== The Flaming Lips ===
Jones narrated the Flaming Lips' fifteenth studio album, King's Mouth, released on 20 April 2019, which is Record Store Day. Jones is also featured on the album's cover artwork. The Flaming Lips' lead vocalist, Wayne Coyne, said of Jones "he's on almost every song... it really is quite unbelievable."

=== The Avalanches ===
Jones was featured, along with Cola Boyy, on the Avalanches' single "We Go On" from their third studio album, We Will Always Love You (2020).

== Musical equipment ==
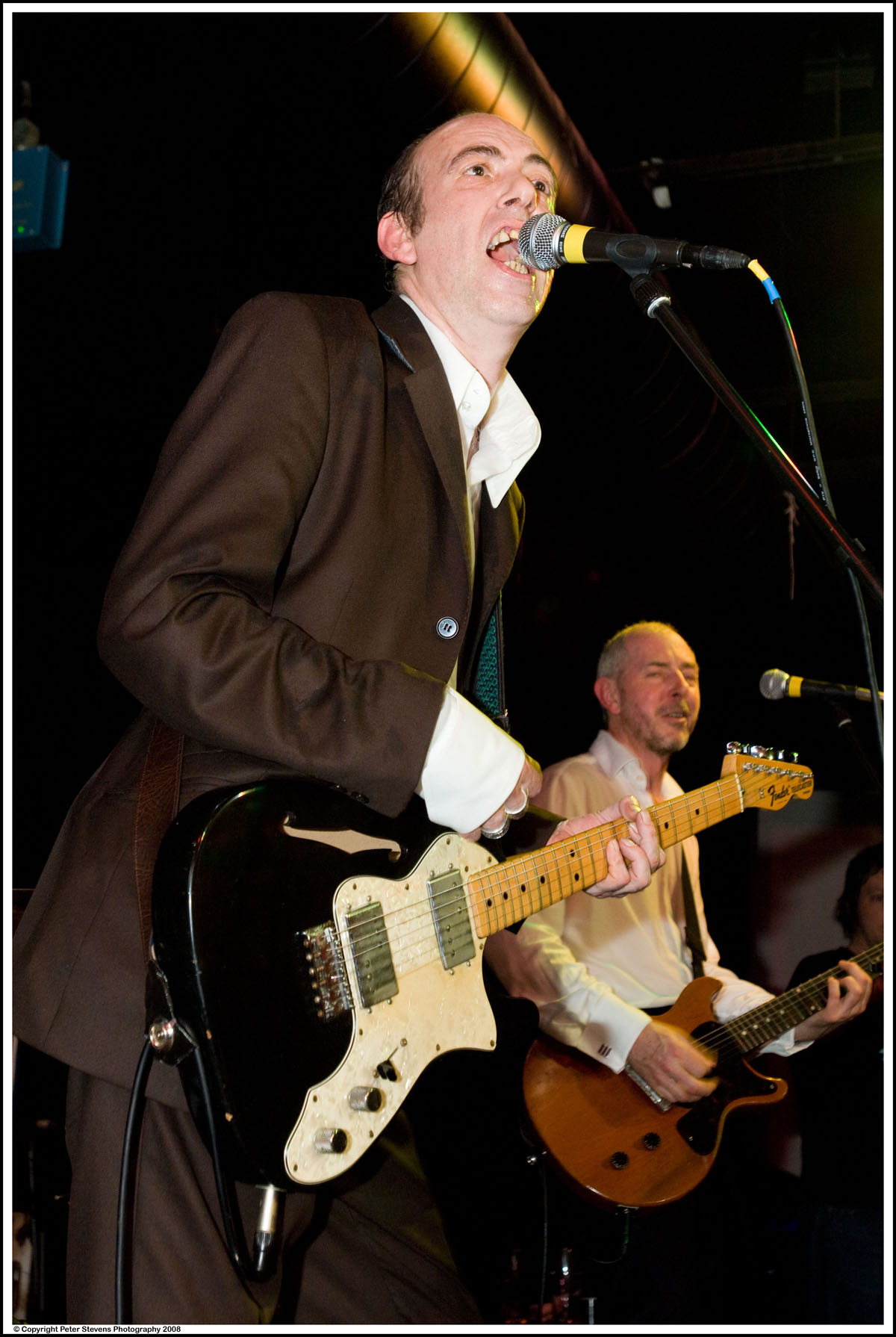
Jones playing his Fender Thinline Telecaster at Carbon Casino VI in London, 2008

Jones' first guitar was a Gibson Les Paul Junior with a P-90 pickup, which he bought because Johnny Thunders used one. The Junior was his main guitar up until late 1977 or early 1978, and after that as a backup and studio guitar. Around the same time he also owned another Les Paul Junior, all black (formerly red) with a black pickguard, which was smashed at a performance in 1977. He then switched to a Gibson Les Paul Standard and later to Gibson Les Paul Custom.

Jones also occasionally played an Olympic White Fender Stratocaster (for live versions of "Straight to Hell") and several Bond Electraglide guitars that were donated to him by Andrew Bond, who made the guitars. For effects Jones mainly uses MXR pedals including a Phase 100, a flanger, an analog delay and a noise gate as well as a Roland chorus or Space Echo effect. During his days with the Clash, Jones used a Marshall Plexi amplifier and occasionally a Fender Twin with a 2×12 cabinet. He later changed to a Mesa/Boogie amplifier with two Marshall 4×12 cabinets that he used throughout the rest of his career with the Clash.
