= Circle Jerks discography =

Discography

- Studio albums: 6
- Live albums: 2
- Singles: 6
- Video albums: 1

This is a comprehensive discography of the Circle Jerks, a California-based punk rock band. They have released six studio albums, one live album, one compilation album, and one video album.

== Biography ==
The Circle Jerks were formed in Southern California in 1979, and originally comprised Keith Morris on vocals, Greg Hetson on guitar, Roger Rogerson on bass and Lucky Lehrer on drums. Their debut album, Group Sex was released in 1980 on the Frontier Records label; its 14 songs totaled out at 15 minutes. It featured two songs that Morris had written while in Black Flag (Black Flag claimed the songs were "theirs") and one song Hetson wrote for his previous band, Redd Kross. That same year, the group was one of several California punk bands to be immortalized in the Penelope Spheeris documentary The Decline of Western Civilization; live versions of five songs from Group Sex appear on the movie's soundtrack.

In 1981, the group signed with IRS Records subsidiary Faulty Products and recorded their second release, Wild in the Streets, the title track of which is a cover version of a Garland Jeffreys tune. Faulty Products ceased operations several months after the release of the album, forcing Circle Jerks to find their third record deal in as many years. They signed a management deal with War producer/manager Jerry Goldstein's Far Out Productions, and recorded their third album, Golden Shower of Hits, in 1983, the album was released on Goldstein's LAX label. One of the songs from the album, "Coup d'État", was used in the soundtrack of Alex Cox's early film Repo Man, and the band makes an appearance playing an acoustic/lounge version of "When The Shit Hits The Fan". Not long after Repo Man had concluded its first-run release schedule, the Circle Jerks experienced its first lineup change, with Rogerson and Lehrer replaced by Earl Liberty and Chuck Biscuits, respectively.

In 1984, Liberty and Biscuits left the Circle Jerks and the band hired Zander Schloss and Keith Clark as Liberty and Biscuits' replacements. The new lineup recorded two more albums before the Circle Jerks split up for the first time in 1990, when Hetson left to tour and record albums with Bad Religion.

A long period of inactivity ended in 1994, when the Circle Jerks reunited and signed a major label deal with Mercury Records, a move that had a few business complications: Hetson was still with Bad Religion, who had signed a long-term contract with Atlantic Records, while Schloss had been part of a band contracted to Interscope. After ironing out these difficulties, the band recorded Oddities, Abnormalities and Curiosities, released in the summer of 1995, but broke up once again. Reasons for this breakup were essentially the same as they were in 1990.

The Circle Jerks reunited once again in 2001, with a new lineup of Morris on vocals, Hetson on guitar, Schloss on bass and Kevin Fitzgerald on drums, but lapsed into inactivity in 2010. According to Hetson, the Circle Jerks may never release a new studio album in the near future, despite the fact that they released one new song "I'm Gonna Live" on their Myspace in 2007.

== Studio albums ==
Year	Title	Label	Format	Other information
1980	Group Sex	Frontier	LP/CD/CS	Debut album
1982	Wild in the Streets	Frontier	LP/CD/CS	Produced by David Anderly and Gary Hirstius
1983	Golden Shower of Hits	Allegiance	LP/CD/CS	Produced by Jerry Goldstein for Avenue Records/Far Out Productions
1985	Wonderful	Combat	LP/CD/CS	
1987	VI	Relativity	LP/CD/CS	Final album before splitting up
1988	Group Sex/Wild in the Streets	Frontier	CD	Rerelease of the first two studio albums; Currently out of print
1995	Oddities, Abnormalities and Curiosities	Mercury	LP/CD/CS	Only reunion album; Major label debut album

== Singles ==
Year	Title	Label	Format
1980	"Wild in the Streets"	Frontier	7"
1983	"Golden Shower of Hits (Jerks on 45)"	LAX Records	7"
1985	"Wönderful"	Combat Core	12"
1990	"Wild in the Streets"	Posh Boy	7"
1995	"Teenage Electric"	Mercury	7"
2007	"I'm Gonna Live"	self-released	download

== Live albums ==
Year	Title	Label	Format
1992	Gig	Combat	CD
2004	Live at the House of Blues	Kung Fu Records	LP/CD/CS
2010	Live at the Fillmore 1982	CD Presents	download

== Compilation and soundtrack appearances ==
Year	Title	Label	Format	Track
1980	The Decline of Western Civilization	Slash Records	LP/CD	"Red Tape", "Back Against the Wall", "I Just Want Some Skank", "Beverly Hills"
1980	Rodney on the ROQ	Posh Boy	LP/CD	"Wild in the Streets"
1981	Let Them Eat Jellybeans!	Alternative Tentacles	LP	"Paid Vacation"
1982	Rat Music for Rat People, Vol. 1	Go! Records/CD Presents	LP/CD	"Live Fast Die Young"
1984	Repo Man (Music from the Original Motion Picture Soundtrack)	San Andreas Records	LP/CD	"Coup D'État", "When The Shit Hits the Fan"
1986	Sid and Nancy: Love Kills (Music from the Motion Picture Soundtrack)	CD Presents	LP/CD	"Love Kills"

== Music videos ==
- "Beverly Hills"/"Wasted" (1985)
- "I Wanna Destroy You" (1995)

== Video albums ==
Year	Title	Label	Format	Other information
2005	The Show Must Go Off!	Kung Fu	DVD	
