= List of Circle Jerks band members =

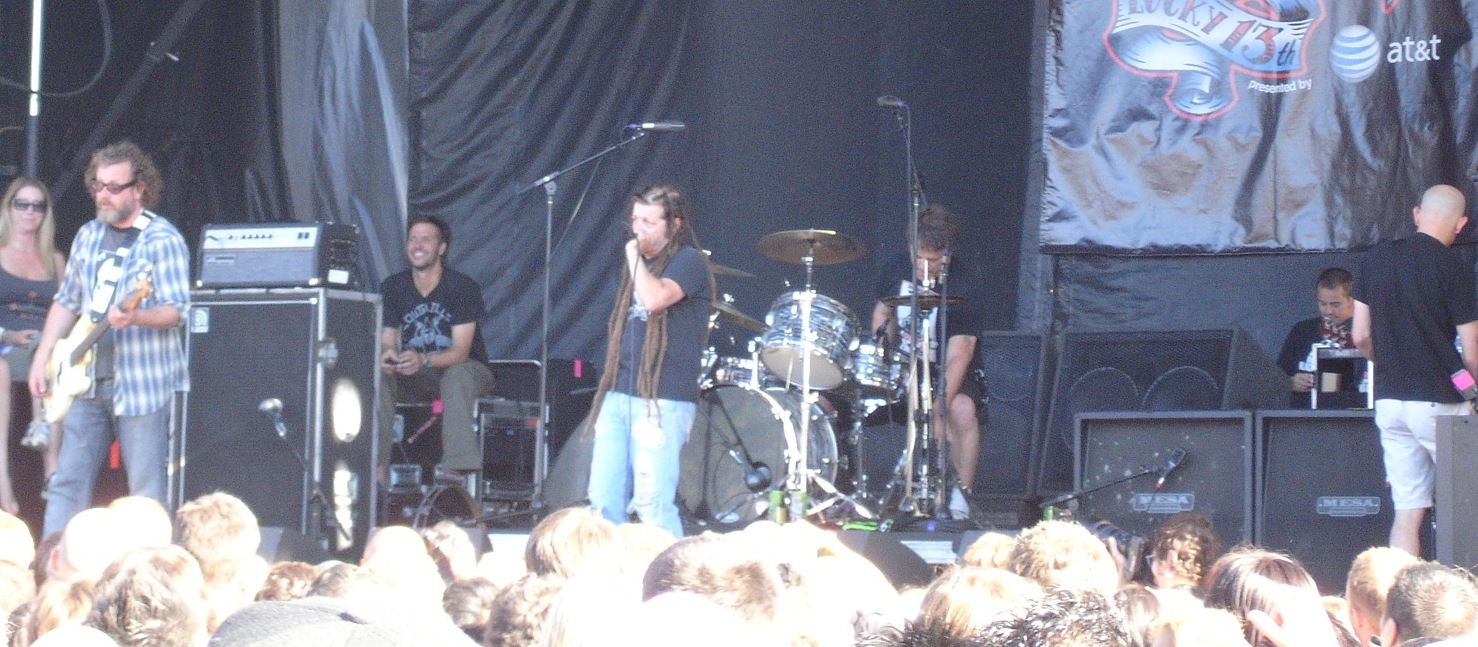
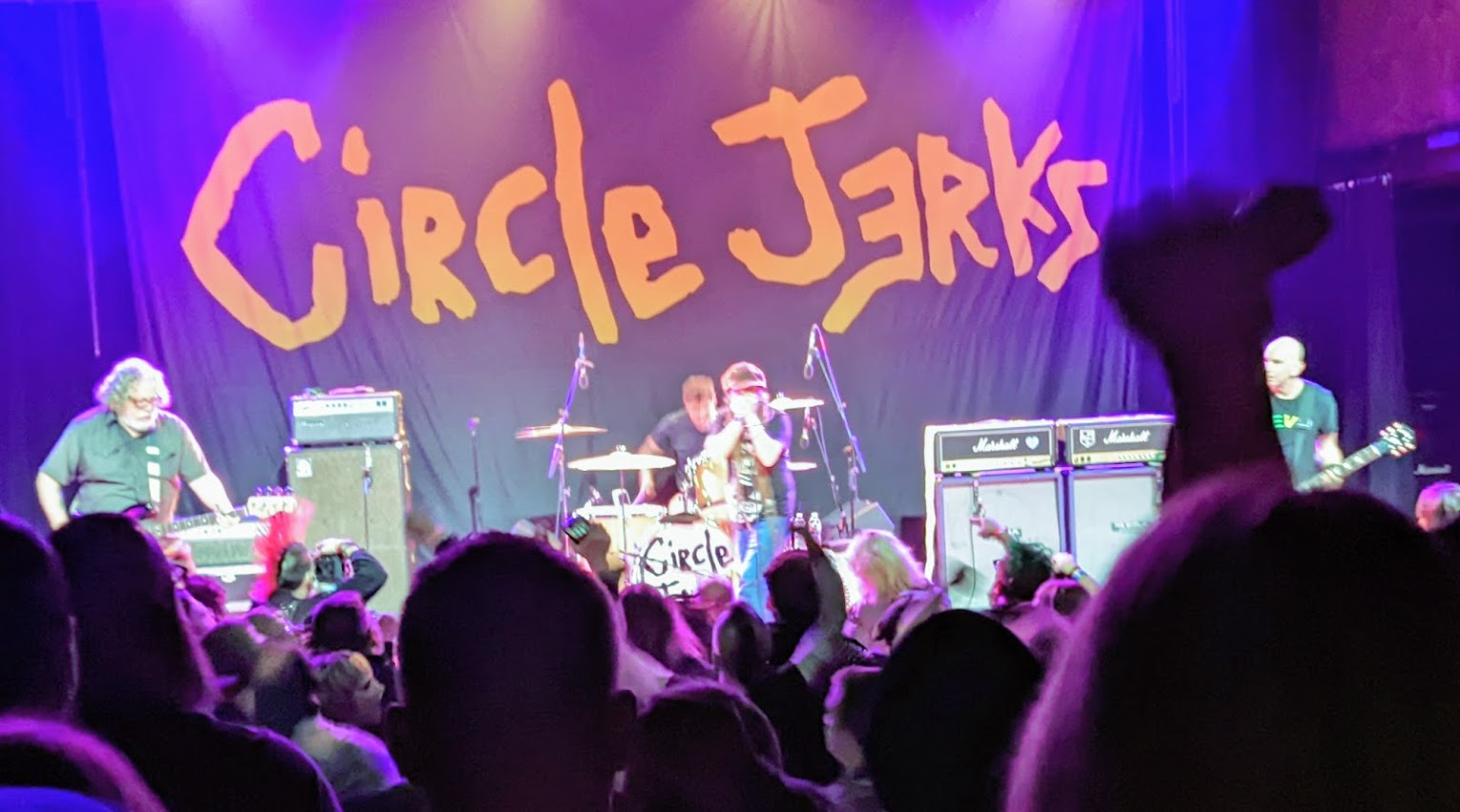
Two line-ups of Circle Jerks in 2007 and 2022

The Circle Jerks are an American punk rock band which consists of vocalist Keith Morris and guitarist Greg Hetson (both since 1979) alongside bassist Zander Schloss (since 1983), and drummer Joey Castillo (since 2019). The band was formed in Southern California in 1979, and originally comprised Morris, Hetson, Roger Rogerson on bass and Lucky Lehrer on drums.

== History ==
The first Circle Jerks lineup released three albums (including their 1980 debut Group Sex), before Rogerson and Lehrer were kicked out of the band in 1983 and replaced by Earl Liberty and Chuck Biscuits respectively. This lineup lasted only a year, and the Circle Jerks hired Zander Schloss and Keith Clark as Liberty and Biscuits' replacements. The new lineup, consisting of Morris, Hetson, Schloss and Clark, recorded two more albums before the Circle Jerks split up for the first time in 1990, when Hetson left to concentrate on Bad Religion, which he had joined a few years before.

A long period of inactivity ended in 1994, when the Circle Jerks, with the 1984-1990 lineup, reunited and signed a major label deal with Mercury Records, a move that had a few business complications: Hetson was still with Bad Religion, who had signed a long-term contract with Atlantic Records, while Schloss had been part of a band contracted to Interscope. After ironing out these difficulties, the band recorded Oddities, Abnormalities and Curiosities and released it in the summer of 1995, but broke up once again. Reasons for this breakup were essentially the same as they were in 1990.

A second Circle Jerks reunion occurred in 2001. Participating this time were Morris, Hetson, Schloss and Kevin Fitzgerald, who filled in on drums for Clark, who at that time had retired from the music business. Tensions among its members and failed attempts to record the follow-up to Oddities, Abnormalities and Curiosities resulted in the Circle Jerks breaking up yet again in 2011. The band announced in November 2019 that they would reunite in 2020 to celebrate the 40th anniversary of Group Sex with live shows.

== Members ==
=== Current ===
Image	Name	Years active	Instruments	Release contributions
	Keith Morris	1979–1990; 1994–1995; 1998; 2001–2011; 2019–present	lead vocals	all Circle Jerks releases
	Greg Hetson	1979–1990; 1994–1995; 1998; 2001–2011; 2019–present	guitar; backing vocals	all Circle Jerks releases
	Zander Schloss	1984-1988; 1989-1990; 1994–1995; 1998; 2001–2011; 2019–present	bass; backing vocals	All Circle Jerks releases since Wonderful (1985)
	Joey Castillo	2019–present	drums	You Got Your Descendents In My Circle Jerks EP (2024)

=== Former ===
Image	Name	Years active	Instruments	Release contributions
	Roger Rogerson	1979–1983 (died 1996)	bass; backing vocals	Group Sex (1980); Wild in the Streets (1982); Golden Shower of Hits (1983)
	Lucky Lehrer	1979–1983	drums	Group Sex (1980); Wild in the Streets (1982)
	John Ingram	1983	drums	Golden Shower of Hits (1983)
	Chuck Biscuits	1983–1984	drums	Repo Man soundtrack (1984)
	Earl Liberty	1983–1984	bass; backing vocals	Repo Man soundtrack (1984)
	Keith Clark	1984–1990; 1994–1995	drums; backing vocals	Wonderful (1985); VI (1987); Gig (1992); Oddities, Abnormalities and Curiosities (1995)
	Kevin Fitzgerald	2001–2010	drums	Live at the House of Blues (2005); I'm Gonna Live - single (2007)

=== Touring ===
Image	Name	Years active	Instruments	Release contributions
	Charlie Quintana	1981 (East Coast tour) (died 2018)	drums	none
	Flea	1984	bass	none
	Chris Poland	1988	bass	none
	Scotty G	1988	bass	none
	Doug Carrion	1989	bass	none
