= Group Sex =

Group Sex may refer to:

- Group sex, sexual activity involving more than two participants
- Group Sex (album), by Circle Jerks, 1980
  - Group Sex/Wild in the Streets, a compilation album, 1988
- Group Sex (film), 2010
