= Golden Shower of Hits =

Studio album by Circle Jerks
- Released: July 21, 1983
- Recorded: December 1982, March 1983
- Studio: Sunset Sound (Hollywood); Capitol (Hollywood)
- Genre: Hardcore punk
- Length: 27:34
- Label: Allegiance, LAX
- Producer: Jerry Goldstein

Circle Jerks chronology
Wild in the Streets (1982)	Golden Shower of Hits (1983)	Wonderful (1985)

Singles from Golden Shower of Hits
- 1. "Golden Shower of Hits (Jerks on 45)" Released: June 1983

Golden Shower of Hits is the third studio album by American hardcore punk band Circle Jerks, released July 21, 1983, by the labels Allegiance and LAX Records. It was the band's last album to feature the band's original bassist Roger Rogerson and their only release to feature drummer John Ingram, who briefly replaced Lucky Lehrer. After the album, the band's music took a different direction on their next studio album, Wonderful (1985).

== Background ==
The album was produced by LAX's owner, Jerry Goldstein, who had signed the band to his Far Out Management company. Goldstein was known for his work as a former member of the Strangeloves, co-writer of the 1963 hit "My Boyfriend's Back", producer/songwriter for War and former manager of Sly and the Family Stone.

The title track, "Golden Shower of Hits (Jerks on 45)", also released as a single, was a riff on the popular "Stars on 45" medley from 1981. It featured a medley of six cover versions ("Along Comes Mary", "Close to You", "Afternoon Delight", "Having My Baby", "Love Will Keep Us Together" and "D-I-V-O-R-C-E") strung together to create a storyline of two people who fall in love, have an unplanned pregnancy, rush into marriage, and end up divorced.

== Reception ==
Professional ratings
Review scores
Source	Rating
AllMusic	4/5 stars
The Rolling Stone Album Guide	2.5/5 stars

Critical reception for Golden Shower of Hits has been mostly positive. Greg Prato of AllMusic claimed that "everything you love about legendary Californian punkers the Circle Jerks is gloriously displayed on Golden Shower of Hits." He added that "obnoxious humor (Keith Morris' vocals, the album cover), disjointed guitars courtesy of Greg Hetson, and sloppy yet excited rhythm work (bassist Roger Rogerson and drummer John Ingram) all add up to perhaps the ultimate punk rock party", and called Golden Shower of Hits an "ultimate introduction to this one-of-a-kind band".

Golden Shower of Hits received another positive review from Jeff Bale of Maximum Rock 'n' Roll, who claimed that the album "ranks somewhere between their great debut and its so-so follow-up, Wild in the Streets". About the album's music, Bale stated that "the songs range from vintage Jerks - short, tuneful blasts like 'In Your Eyes' and 'Coup d'Etat' - to boring mid-tempo rockish numbers (like 'When the Shit Hits the Fan' and 'Rats of Reality') that seem to be aimed at a crossover hard rock/HM audience".

== In popular culture ==
The songs "Coup d'État" and "When the Shit Hits the Fan" were featured on the soundtrack to the 1984 Alex Cox film Repo Man. "When the Shit Hits the Fan" was re-recorded for the soundtrack, with Earl Liberty and Chuck Biscuits replacing Rogerson and Lehrer.

== Track listing ==
No.	Title	Writer(s)	Length
1.	"In Your Eyes"	Keith Morris, Greg Hetson, Roger Rogerson, John Ingram	0:41
2.	"Parade of the Horribles"	Lehrer, Hetson	1:30
3.	"Under the Gun"	Morris, Hetson	2:56
4.	"When the Shit Hits the Fan"	Morris, Hetson	2:34
5.	"Bad Words"	Morris, Rogerson	1:43
6.	"Red Blanket Room"	Morris, Hetson, Rogerson, Ingram	1:32
7.	"High Price on Our Heads"	Rogerson	2:52
8.	"Coup d'Etat"	Morris, Hetson	1:59
9.	"Product of My Environment"	Morris, Rogerson	1:46
10.	"Rats of Reality"	Hetson, Rogerson	3:19
11.	"Junk Mail"	Morris, Rogerson	1:20
12.	"Golden Shower of Hits (Jerks on 45)": 1. "Along Comes Mary"; 2. "Close to You"; 3. "Afternoon Delight"; 4. "Having My Baby"; 5. "Love Will Keep Us Together"; 6. "D-I-V-O-R-C-E"; "	1. Tandyn Almer; 2. Burt Bacharach, Hal David; 3. Bill Danoff; 4. Paul Anka; 5. Neil Sedaka, Howard Greenfield; 6. Bobby Braddock, Curly Putman	5:12
Total length:			27:34

== Personnel ==
- Keith Morris - lead vocals
- Greg Hetson - guitar
- Roger Rogerson - bass
- John Ingram - drums

=== Production ===
- Jerry Goldstein - production
- Steve Barncard; Bobby Lewis; John Fishback - engineering
- Scott Hasson - assistant engineer
- Bill Inglot; Ken Perry - mastering
- Glen E. Friedman - photography
- Mike Dowd - design
