= Midnight Snack Break at the Poodle Factory =

Studio album by Midget Handjob
- Released: September 26, 2000
- Recorded: October 1999 – March 2000
- Genres: Punk jazz; punk blues; spoken word; alternative rock; indie rock
- Length: 60:05
- Label: Epitaph

Midnight Snack Break at the Poodle Factory is the only album by Punk jazz supergroup Midget Handjob, formed by former Black Flag and Circle Jerks singer Keith Morris. Stylistically, the album combines elements of hardcore punk, jazz, and spoken word. It was released on Epitaph Records on September 26, 2000. Personnel included Keith Morris (talking), Brandon Jay (percussion), Kevin Fitzgerald (percussion), Tony Malone (guitar, baritone guitar, bass), John Wahl (alto, tenor, and baritone sax, piano, clavinette, bass), Jean Lebear Haberman (sac, flute, trombone), Chris Bagarozzi (guitar, baritone guitar, lap steel, bass, ebow), Petra Haden (violin), and Tom Grimley (electric macarena machine).

== Track listing ==
No.	Title	Length
1.	"99 Cent Store Blues"	2:31
2.	"Mail Order Revolution"	6:34
3.	"Black Christmas Tree"	4:04
4.	"Jackhammer Floral Arrangement"	3:29
5.	"Zooming Smoothly"	6:17
6.	"Ticket Out"	4:34
7.	"Henry the Dentist"	1:38
8.	"Pornographic Scenes and Smiling Dreams"	5:05
9.	"Hugly Day"	8:01
10.	"Hurricane Morris"	14:41
11.	"...And the Bill Collecters Won't Stop Buggin'"	8:30
