= Group Sex/Wild in the Streets =

Compilation album by Circle Jerks
- Released: 1988
- Recorded: Tracks 1–14: 1980 at Byrdcliffe Studios, Culver City, California; Tracks 15–29: 1981–1982 at A & M Studio D, Hollywood, California
- Genre: Hardcore punk
- Length: 41:17
- Label: Frontier
- Producer: Circle Jerks/Cary Markoff, David Anderly/Gary Hirstius

Circle Jerks chronology
VI (1987)	Group Sex/Wild in the Streets (1988)	Gig (1992)

Professional ratings
Review scores
Source	Rating
AllMusic	link

Group Sex/Wild in the Streets is a compilation album by American hardcore punk band Circle Jerks, released in 1988 by Frontier Records. It is a CD re-release of the band's first two albums, Group Sex (1980) and Wild in the Streets (1982), containing all of the tracks from both releases making it a total of 29 tracks.

== Track listing ==
- Track 1–14: Group Sex.
- Track 15–29: Wild in the Streets.
1. "Deny Everything" (0:27)
2. "I Just Want Some Skank" (1:09)
3. "Beverly Hills" (1:06)
4. "Operation" (1:30)
5. "Back Against the Wall" (1:35)
6. "Wasted" (0:43)
7. "Behind the Door" (1:25)
8. "World Up My Ass" (1:17)
9. "Paid Vacation" (1:28)
10. "Don't Care" (0:35)
11. "Live Fast Die Young" (1:33)
12. "What's Your Problem" (0:57)
13. "Group Sex" (1:03)
14. "Red Tape" (0:56)
15. "Wild in the Streets" (2:33)
16. "Leave Me Alone" (1:18)
17. "Stars and Stripes" (1:39)
18. "86'd (Good as Gone)" (1:54)
19. "Meet the Press" (1:19)
20. "Trapped" (1:39)
21. "Murder the Disturbed" (2:01)
22. "Letter Bomb" (1:13)
23. "Question Authority" (2:00)
24. "Defamation Innuendo" (2:21)
25. "Moral Majority" (0:54)
26. "Forced Labor" (1:16)
27. "Political Stu" (1:36)
28. "Just Like Me" (1:46)
29. "Put a Little Love in Your Heart" (2:12)

== Release and reception ==
In an AllMusic review, Sean Westergaard says "In 1993, Frontier combined the first two albums from the Circle Jerks onto a single cassette and a double-LP set. Group Sex (1980) is their finest album, and together with Wild in the Streets (1982), is an excellent way to check out the beginnings of this important early-'80s SoCal hardcore band.".
