= Peter McCarthy (film producer) =

American film producer, screenwriter, director, and editor

- Born: 1950 or 1951; Chicago, Illinois
- Occupations: Producer; Screenwriter; Director; Editor
- Years active: 1984–2014

Peter McCarthy is an American film producer, screenwriter, director, and editor. He is best known as a producer on the film Repo Man.

Originally from Chicago, McCarthy moved to Los Angeles to attend film school at UCLA. There, he met Alex Cox and Jonathan Wacks, with whom he went on to make Repo Man. McCarthy and Wacks established a production company in Venice Beach and created the film as their first feature release. He continued producing films in the 1980s, including Sid and Nancy, I'm Gonna Git You Sucka, and Tapeheads. McCarthy directed his first film, Floundering, in 1994.
