= VI (Circle Jerks album) =

Studio album by Circle Jerks
- Released: 1987
- Genre: Hardcore punk
- Length: 29:21
- Label: Relativity
- Producer: Circle Jerks, Karat Faye

Circle Jerks chronology
Wonderful (1985)	VI (1987)	Group Sex/Wild in the Streets (1988)

VI is the fifth studio album by American hardcore punk band Circle Jerks, released in 1987 by Relativity Records. Taking into account the Circle Jerks' contribution to the documentary and soundtrack The Decline of Western Civilization, VI is the band's sixth album. It was the band's last album before its five-year hiatus from 1989 to 1994. This album's lineup later reunited in 1995 to record its final studio album to date, Oddities, Abnormalities and Curiosities.

== Background ==
"Fortunate Son" is a Creedence Clearwater Revival cover. Another track, "Love Kills", had been commissioned by Alex Cox for the soundtrack of the 1986 movie Sid and Nancy, and was heard in the film.

== Release and reception ==
Professional ratings
Review scores
Source	Rating
AllMusic	3/5 stars
The Rolling Stone Album Guide	2/5 stars

In his AllMusic review, David Cleary says, "This strong album is one of the band's best. Tempos here are slowed down from that of standard hardcore; as a result, the songs here inhabit the uneasy netherworld between punk and heavy metal traversed most successfully by the Stooges and the Dictators. Only Keith Morris' raspy, growling vocals retain the band's tie with classic hardcore. Songwriting is still inconsistent, but there are a surprisingly large number of strong selections here, and all are performed with fiery energy. Highlights include 'Casualty Vampire', 'I Don't', and the top-notch 'Beat Me Senseless'. There's also a rushed and raw cover of the Creedence Clearwater Revival chestnut 'Fortunate Son'. This platter is well worth hearing."

== Track listing ==
1. "Beat Me Senseless" (Greg Hetson, Keith Clark, Keith Morris) – 1:57
2. "Patty's Killing Mel" (Zander Schloss) – 2:05
3. "Casualty Vampire" (Hetson, Clark, Morris, Schloss) – 2:36
4. "Tell Me Why" (Hetson, Morris, Schloss) – 3:18
5. "Protection" (Clark, Morris, Schloss) – 1:45
6. "I'm Alive" (Clark, Morris, Schloss) – 2:37
7. "Status Clinger" (Clark, Schloss) – 2:43
8. "Living" (Darren Lipscomb, Clark, Schloss) – 2:29
9. "American Way" (Clark, Schloss) – 1:44
10. "Fortunate Son" (John Fogerty) – 2:02
11. "Love Kills" (Clark, Morris, Schloss) – 2:33
12. "All Wound Up" (Hetson, Morris, Schloss) – 1:32
13. "I Don't" (Hetson, Schloss) – 2:00

== Personnel ==
- Keith Morris - vocals
- Greg Hetson - guitar
- Zander Schloss - bass
- Keith Clark - drums
- Karat Faye - production, engineering
- Eddy Schreyer - mastering
- Edward J. Repka - design
- Mark Weinberg - art direction
- Gary Leonard - photography
