= Zander Schloss =

American musician, actor and composer (born 1961)

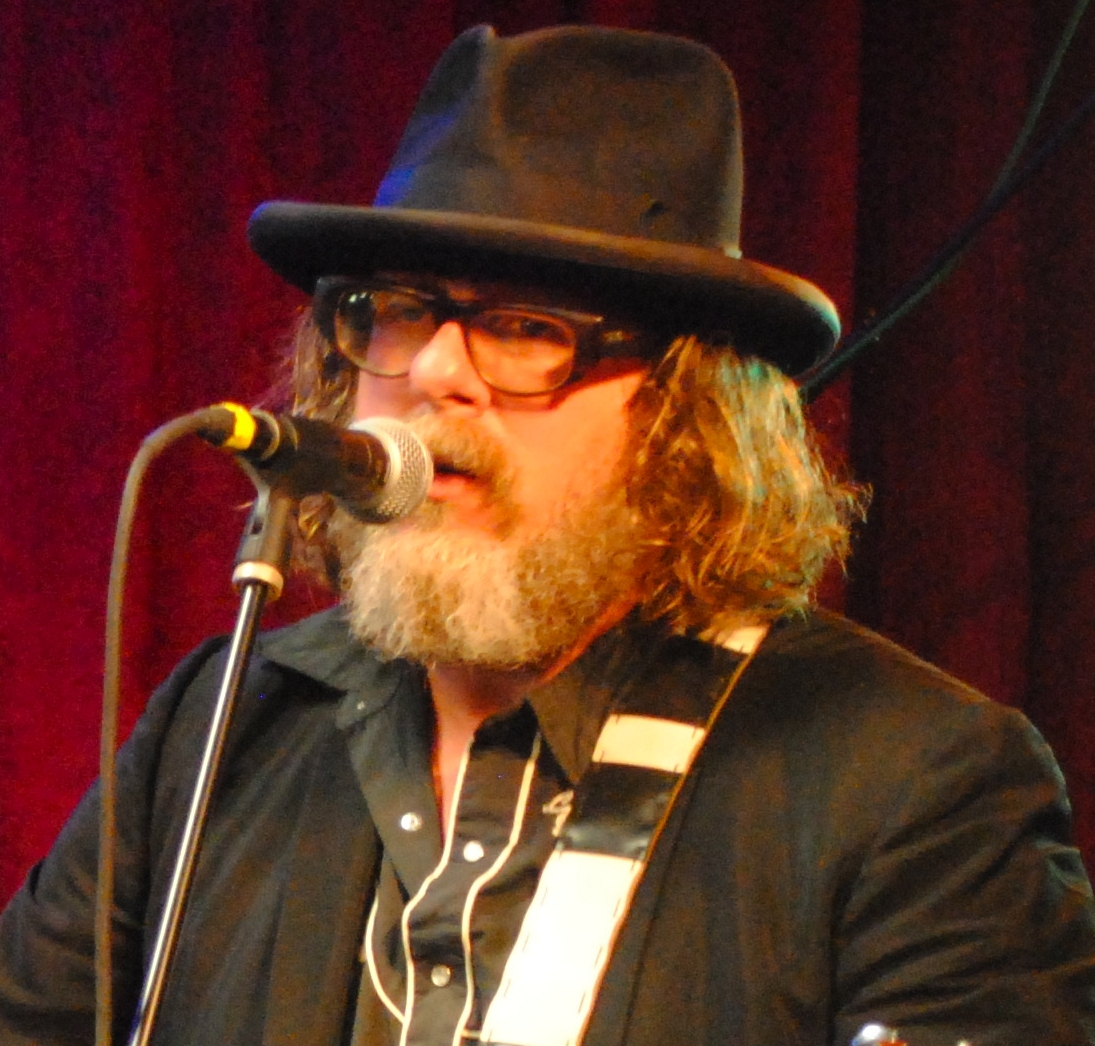
- Schloss in 2010

Background information
- Born: August 7, 1961 (age 64)

Zander Schloss (born August 7, 1961) is an American musician, actor and composer. He is known as bass player for the Circle Jerks, the Weirdos, his many collaborations with Joe Strummer musically and in film and for his contributions to independent feature films.

His first screen appearance was as "Kevin the Nerd" in Repo Man. He went on to appear in a number of Alex Cox films as well as to make significant musical contributions in other Cox features such as Sid and Nancy (1986), Straight to Hell (1987), Walker (1987), El Patrullero (1991) and The Winner (1996).

== Discography ==
- Sean Wheeler and Zander Schloss
  - Walk Thee Invisible (album) (2010, LP)
  - Other Desert Cities (album) (2014, LP)
- with Joe Strummer
  - Walker (1987, LP)
  - Permanent Record (1988, LP)
  - Trash City (1988, LP)
  - Earthquake Weather (1989, LP)
- with Die' Hunns
  - You Rot Me (2006, LP)
- The Gousters (2005, LP)
- with Thelonious Monster
  - Beautiful Mess (1992, LP)
- with Bob Forrest
  - Modern Folk and Blues Wednesday (2006, LP)
- with The Too Free Stooges
  - Roadside Prophets (1992, LP)
- with Magnificent Bastards
  - Working Class Hero (1995, LP)
  - Mockingbird Girl (1995, LP)
  - 12 Bar Blues (1998, LP)
- with Low and Sweet Orchestra
  - Goodbye to All That (1996, LP)
- with Mike Watt
  - Ball-Hog or Tugboat? (1994, LP)
- with Robi Draco Rosa
  - Frio (1991, LP)
  - Vino (2008, LP)
- with Stan Ridgway
  - Floundering (1994, LP)
- with Mike Martt
  - Tomorrow Shines Bright (2003, LP)
- with The Weirdos
  - Live on the Radio (2004, LP)
- with the Circle Jerks
  - Wonderful (1985, LP)
  - Sid & Nancy (1986, LP)
  - VI (1987, LP)
  - Gig (1991, LP)
  - Oddities, Abnormalities and Curiosities (1995, LP)
  - The Show Must Go Off! (2005, DVD)
  - TBA (2008/2009, LP)
- with Pray for Rain
  - Straight to Hell (1987, LP)
- with the Juicy Bananas
  - Repo Man (1984, LP)

=== Soundtracks ===
- Repo Man (1984)
- Sid & Nancy (1986)
- Straight to Hell (1987)
- Walker (1987)
- Tapeheads (1988)
- Permanent Record (1988)
- El Patrullero (1991)
- Roadside Prophets (1992)
- Money for Nothing (1993)
- Floundering (1994)
- Tank Girl (1995)
- The Winner (1996)
- The Beatnicks (1996)

== Filmography ==
- Repo Man: Kevin (1984)
- Straight to Hell: Karl (1987)
- Walker: Huey (1987)
- Tapeheads: Heavy Metal Fan (1988)
- Money for Nothing (1993)
- Floundering (1994)
- Three Businessmen Daddy Z (Poster Art) (1998)
- Desperate But Not Serious (1999)
- Fear of a Punk Planet (2001)
- That Darn Punk (2001)
- Average Man (2005)
- American Hardcore: Himself (2006)
- The Future is Unwritten: Himself (2007)
- Repo Chick (2009)
- Bob and the Monster: Himself (2011)
- Dead Souls: Borracho (2025)
