= Wild in the Streets (Circle Jerks album) =

Studio album by Circle Jerks
- Released: March 4, 1982
- Recorded: December 1981
- Studio: A&M, Hollywood, California
- Genre: Hardcore punk
- Length: 25:37
- Label: Faulty Products; Frontier
- Producer: David Anderle, Gary Hirstius

Circle Jerks chronology
Group Sex (1980)	Wild in the Streets (1982)	Golden Shower of Hits (1983)

Wild in the Streets is the second studio album by American hardcore punk band Circle Jerks. It was released on March 4, 1982, by Faulty Products, a sub-label of I.R.S. Records.

== Background ==
The album featured three cover songs, including the title track, originally by Garland Jeffreys; "Just Like Me", originally performed by Paul Revere & the Raiders; and "Put a Little Love in Your Heart", originally performed by Jackie DeShannon.

The album cover, a photo by punk photographer Ed Colver, featured an image of the band members and others (including Mike Ness of Social Distortion) running in the streets at Columbus Avenue, San Francisco, California.

== Reception ==
Professional ratings
Review scores
Source	Rating
AllMusic	3/5 stars
The Rolling Stone Album Guide	2.5/5 stars

Wild in the Streets received a mixed review from Stephen Thomas Erlewine of AllMusic, who claimed that it does not have "the wild, appealingly offensive mixture of crude lyrics and frenetic riffs that made the Circle Jerks' debut, Group Sex". However, Erlewine added that "there are enough tracks that nearly make the mark -- including a tongue-in-cheek cover of 'Put a Little Love in Your Heart' and the title track, which is a version of the theme song to the '60s teen exploitation flick of the same name -- to make it worthwhile for Orange County punk fanatics".

== Reissues ==
In 1988, the album was remixed and reissued on Frontier Records, both on its own in cassette and vinyl formats, and paired with the band's debut as Group Sex/Wild in the Streets on CD.

A 40th anniversary edition came out in 2022, with a 20-page booklet featuring an album history by L.A. music writer Chris Morris.

== Track listing ==
No.	Title	Writer(s)	Length
1.	"Wild in the Streets"	Garland Jeffreys	2:34
2.	"Leave Me Alone"	Keith Morris, Roger Rogerson	1:19
3.	"Stars and Stripes"	Morris, Greg Hetson	1:39
4.	"86'd (Good as Gone)"	Lucky Lehrer, Hetson	1:54
5.	"Meet the Press"	Lehrer, Rogerson	1:19
6.	"Trapped"	Circle Jerks	1:40
7.	"Murder the Disturbed"	Circle Jerks	2:01
8.	"Letterbomb"	Morris, Hetson	1:11
9.	"Question Authority"	Rogerson	2:00
10.	"Defamation Innuendo"	Morris, Lehrer, Rogerson	2:21
11.	"Moral Majority"	Morris, Hetson	0:55
12.	"Forced Labor"	Rogerson	1:17
13.	"Political Stu"	Circle Jerks	1:34
14.	"Just Like Me"	Rick Dey, Rich Brown	1:46
15.	"Put a Little Love in Your Heart"	Jackie DeShannon, Randy Myers, Jimmy Holiday	2:12
Total length:			25:37

== Personnel ==
- Keith Morris – lead vocals
- Greg Hetson – guitar, backing vocals
- Roger Rogerson – bass
- Lucky Lehrer – drums

Production

- David Anderle; Gary Hirstius – production
- Steve Katz – engineering
- Paul McKenna – assistant engineer
- Frank Deluna – mixing
- John Golden – mastering
- Ed Colver – front cover photo
- Glen E. Friedman – back cover photos
- Carl Grasso; Shawn Kerri – artwork
