= Gig (Circle Jerks album) =

Live album by Circle Jerks
- Released: 1992
- Genre: Punk rock
- Length: 39:23
- Label: Relativity
- Producer: Paul du Gré

Circle Jerks chronology
VI (1987)	Gig (1992)	Oddities, Abnormalities and Curiosities (1995)

Gig is a live album by American punk rock band Circle Jerks, recorded in the late 1980s and released by Relativity Records in 1992.

== Release and reception ==
Professional ratings
Review scores
Source	Rating
AllMusic	4/5 stars
The New Rolling Stone Album Guide	3.5/5 stars

The album was recorded in Los Angeles and Tijuana.

In an AllMusic review, Paul Henderson wrote: "Gig proves yet again that punk rock is meant to be experienced live, and if you missed the Jerks in their heyday, this is the next best thing."

Trouser Press wrote: "Sure it’s fifteen years too late, but the quartet plays ’em like it means ’em, and the hot sound (courtesy producer Paul du Gré) does justice to the spirited performances."

== Track listing ==
1. "Beat Me Senseless" – 2:07
2. "High Price on Our Heads" – 2:19
3. "Letter Bomb" – 1:05
4. "In Your Eyes" – 0:43
5. "Making the Bombs" – 3:26
6. "All Wound Up" – 1:38
7. "Coup d'Etat" – 1:51
8. "Mrs. Jones" – 1:51
9. "Back Against the Wall" – 1:47
10. "Casualty Vampires" – 2:20
11. "I Don't" – 2:06
12. "Making Time" (Creation cover) – 2:23
13. "Junk Mail" – 1:02
14. "I, I & I" – 2:08
15. "World Up My Ass" – 1:15
16. "I Just Want Some Skank" – 1:13
17. "Beverly Hills" – 1:02
18. "The Crowd" – 1:30
19. "When the Shit Hits the Fan" – 2:33
20. "Deny Everything" – 0:36
21. "Wonderful" – 2:32
22. "Wild in the Streets" – 2:58

== Personnel ==
- Keith Morris – lead vocals
- Greg Hetson – guitar
- Zander Schloss – bass
- Keith Clark – drums
- Paul du Gré – producer, mixing
- Carlo Nuccio – mixing
- Eddy Schreyer – mastering
- Michael Webster – digital editing
- David Bett – art direction
- Brian Freeman – design
