= Keith Morris =

American singer

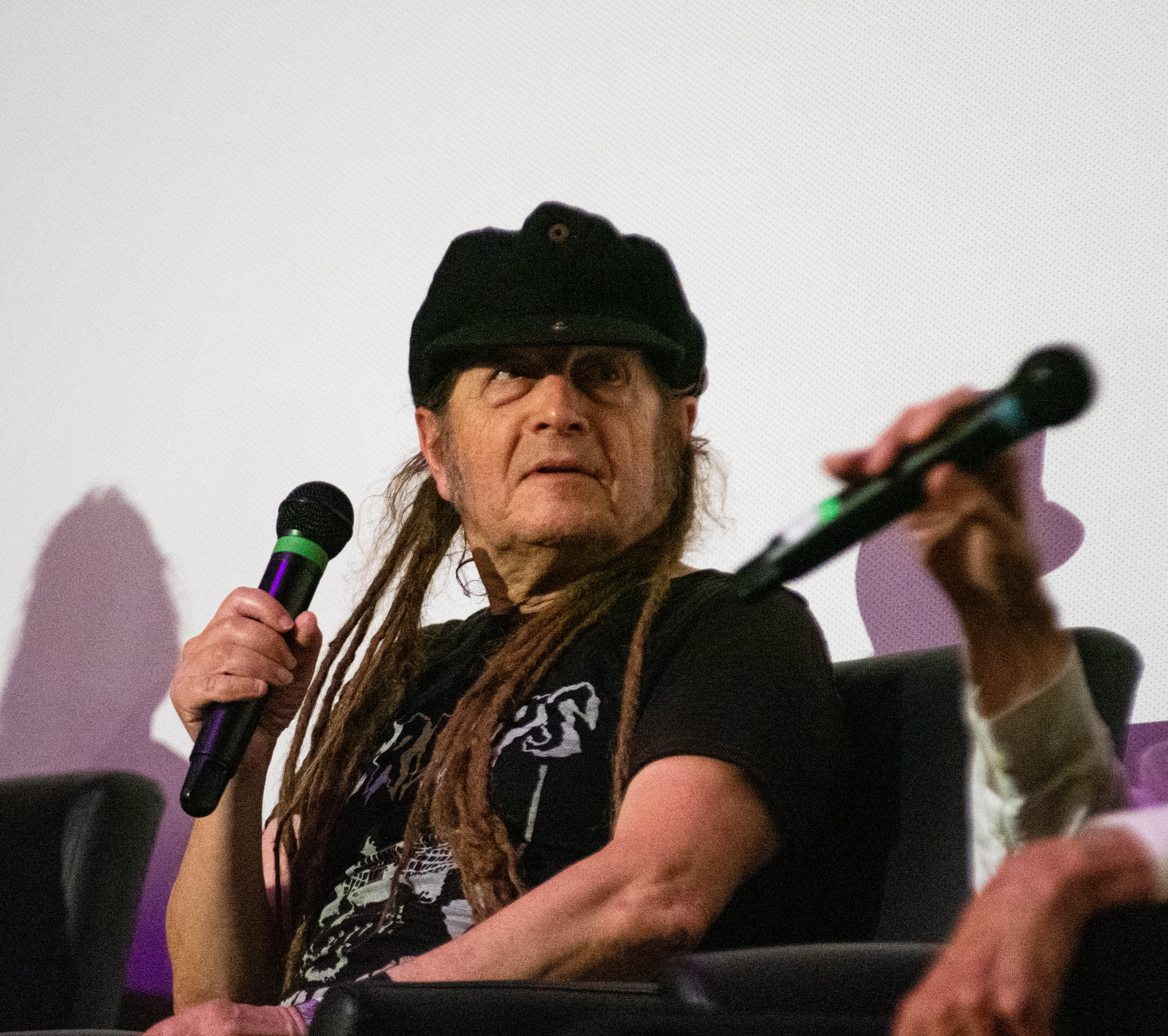
- Morris during a Q&A in 2026

Background information
- Born: September 18, 1955 (age 70); Hermosa Beach, California, United States
- Genres: Hardcore punk
- Occupations: Singer; songwriter
- Instrument: Vocals
- Years active: 1976–present
- Labels: SST; Frontier; Allegiance; Combat; Mercury
- Member of: Circle Jerks; Flag
- Formerly of: Black Flag; Bug Lamp; Midget Handjob; Off!

Keith Brian Morris (born September 18, 1955) is an American singer and songwriter known for his role as frontman of the hardcore punk bands Black Flag, Circle Jerks, and Off!. Born and raised in Hermosa Beach, California, he formed Black Flag at the age of 21 with guitarist Greg Ginn and performed on the band's 1979 debut EP Nervous Breakdown. Shortly after leaving Black Flag in 1979, he formed the Circle Jerks with guitarist Greg Hetson; the band released seven albums between 1980 and 1995 and have broken up and reformed on numerous occasions. In 2009 Morris formed the supergroup Off! with guitarist Dimitri Coats, bassist Steven Shane McDonald, and drummer Mario Rubalcaba. Morris has also appeared as a guest vocalist on several albums by other artists.

== Biography ==
=== Early life ===
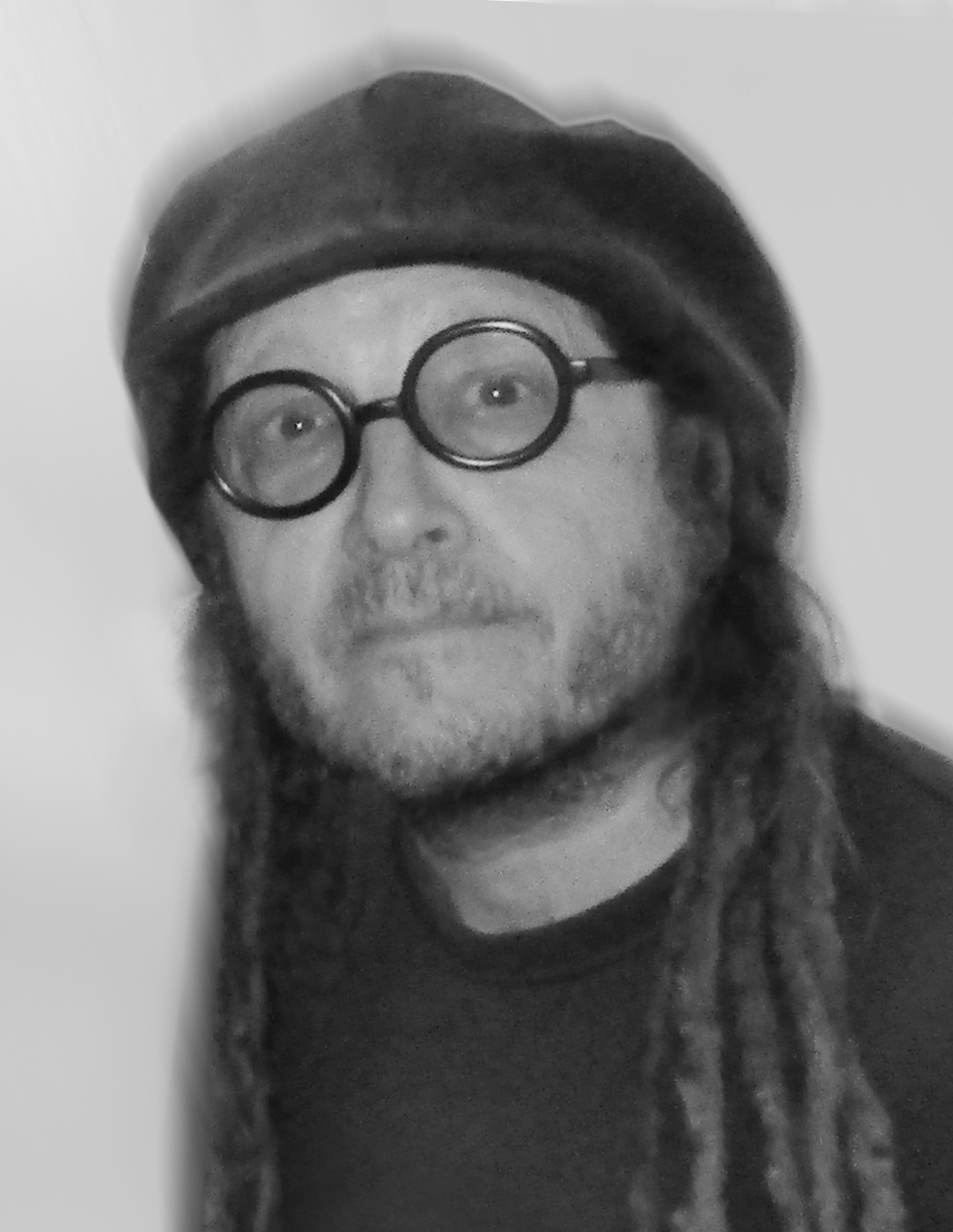
Morris in Los Angeles, 2017

Keith Brian Morris was born September 18, 1955, and grew up in Hermosa Beach, California. Morris is Jewish. His father, Jerry, had been a budding jazz drummer in his youth and practiced with visiting jazz groups at the Lighthouse Café. Jerry later opened a bait shop in the 1970s and struck up a friendship with jazz record producer Ozzie Cadena (both men's sons, Keith and Dez, later became singers in Black Flag). Keith attended Mira Costa High School, where brothers Greg and Raymond Ginn were also students, and graduated in 1973. He then studied fine art and painting at the Pasadena Arts Center while working at his father's bait shop. One of his co-workers at the shop was Bill Stevenson, a Mira Costa student eight years Morris' junior who would also go on to be a member of Black Flag.

Morris and his friends spent their spare time hanging out by the Strand under Hermosa Beach pier, where they took drugs: "I'd get off work, and we'd get up to trouble," he later recalled, "smoking angel dust, snorting elephant tranquilizers. Just real goofy, 'why-would-you-want-to-do-that?' kinda stuff, the kind of thing you get up to when you're young, and into experimenting. If it was a good experience, then cool; if not, well, then it was just a real hard lesson learned." His early musical tastes included various rock acts such as Bob Seger, Foreigner, Montrose, Styx, Deep Purple, Black Sabbath, Queen, Ten Years After, Status Quo, Uriah Heep, UFO, the Scorpions, Aerosmith, Ted Nugent, and the MC5, "any kind of fist-pumping, 'flick-your-bic' rock. I was into anything that was loud". He became a freely opinionated and passionate fan of heavy rock and proto-punk, and took a job working at local record store Rubion Records.

=== Black Flag ===
In 1976, Morris co-founded Black Flag (then-known as Panic) along with guitarist Greg Ginn. Their work ethic proved too challenging for some early members; Ginn and Morris had an especially hard time finding a reliable bass guitarist, and often rehearsed without a bassist, a factor that contributed to the development of Ginn's distinctive, often low-pitched guitar sound. The band went through three bass players before Chuck Dukowski joined and then Robo answered a Pennysaver ad and became their drummer.

After a number of line-up changes, Morris recorded vocals for the first Black Flag EP Nervous Breakdown. After two years in the band, Morris left the band citing, among other reasons, creative differences with Ginn and Dukowski and his own "freaking out on cocaine and speed." Morris stated in his autobiography he had also become disillusioned with what he saw as Black Flag's "militaristic" approach to practicing, despite not getting many shows at the time, and being left "out of the loop" on decisions for the band.

=== Circle Jerks ===
After leaving Black Flag in 1979, Morris founded the Circle Jerks, along with former Redd Kross guitarist Greg Hetson. They were soon joined by Roger Rogerson (bass) and Lucky Lehrer (drums). In contrast to the top-down decision-making of Black Flag, the Circle Jerks agreed on collective decisions for material and performances. Morris and the band increased their global popularity after being featured in the Penelope Spheeris 1981 documentary The Decline of Western Civilization. Cited as one of the most important hardcore punk groups, the Circle Jerks were active until 1990, when Hetson left the band to continue playing guitar and release a number of albums with Bad Religion.

The Circle Jerks reunited in 1994 and released their last studio album to date in 1995. The group performed on and off until 2011, when they went back on hiatus. In November 2019, plans were announced for a 2020 reunion tour in support of the 40th anniversary of their 1980 album, Group Sex, however the tour was postponed until September 2021 due to the COVID-19 pandemic. The band continued touring North & South America with the Descendents in 2023 and 2024 and Europe in 2025.

=== Off! ===
In 2010, Morris formed Off! with Dimitri Coats from Burning Brides when the Circle Jerks could not agree on material for a new album. They were soon joined by bassist Steven Shane McDonald from Redd Kross and drummer Mario Rubalcaba from Earthless/Rocket From The Crypt/Hot Snakes.

Morris stated in a 2011 interview that Off! was asked to open future dates for the Red Hot Chili Peppers, and were agreeable despite potential criticism from their fans. Ultimately, Off! ended up not touring with Red Hot Chili Peppers, though singer Anthony Kiedis wore an Off! hat at every show of the band's I'm with You World Tour, as well as some of their music videos.

Off! released a compilation of their first years' work on Vice Records, followed by three studio albums. Their final album, Free LSD, released in 2022, is to be used as the soundtrack to a science fiction film of the same name due for release in 2024. The film was written and directed by guitarist Dimitri Coats, with band members in starring roles. The band announced their breakup in 2024, performing three farewell shows in July of that year to promote the film and album.

=== FLAG ===
In 2013, Keith Morris, Chuck Dukowski, Dez Cadena, Bill Stevenson and Descendents member Stephen Egerton, created FLAG as an offshoot of Black Flag. As of 2013, they were only touring. No plans for an album have been announced.

FLAG
- Genres: Hardcore punk; Sludge metal; Cover
- Years active: 2013-
- Spinoff of: Black Flag
- Members: Keith Morris; Chuck Dukowski; Dez Cadena; Bill Stevenson; Stephen Egerton

=== Other works ===
Morris briefly replaced singer Anthony Kiedis at a Red Hot Chili Peppers show in 1984 in Los Angeles. Kiedis was late to the show so Morris was a last minute replacement and had to improvise the lyrics as he didn't know them.

After the Circle Jerks' first break-up in 1990, Morris led the bands Bug Lamp and Midget Handjob. He also provided backing vocals on "Operation Rescue", from Bad Religion's album Against the Grain (1990).

Morris led Midget Handjob beginning in the 2000s, releasing one album. Their style has been described as "avant-garde-spoken-word-jazz-punk." Ultimate Guitar called Midget Handjob the 24th "weirdest band name of all time", and Kerrang named it the ninth "most offensive band name of all time." The band has reunited on occasions in recent years.

Morris also narrated Chris Fuller's 2007 Gotham Award-nominated independent film Loren Cass.

Morris appeared as the DJ for the West Coast Punk Rock station Channel X in the video game Grand Theft Auto V released on September 17, 2013.

In 2016, Morris released an autobiography called My Damage: The Story of a Punk Rock Survivor.

== Personal life ==
After years of addiction to drugs and alcohol, Morris has been sober since 1988. In 1999, he was diagnosed with adult-onset diabetes.

On April 13, 2022, it was revealed on the Circle Jerks' Facebook page that Morris had contracted and was recovering from COVID-19.

== Discography ==
=== With Black Flag ===
- Nervous Breakdown (1979)
- Tracks 1-9 Everything Went Black (1982)

=== With Circle Jerks ===
- Group Sex (1980)
- Wild in the Streets (1982)
- Golden Shower of Hits (1983)
- Wonderful (1985)
- VI (1987)
- Gig (1992)
- Oddities, Abnormalities and Curiosities (1995)

=== With Bug Lamp ===
- "Howling at the Moon (Sha-La-La)" on Gabba Gabba Hey: A Tribute to the Ramones (1991)
- "El Dorado" on Roadside Prophets soundtrack (1992)
- "The Ballad of Dwight Fry" on Welcome to Our Nightmare: A Tribute to Alice Cooper (1993)

=== With Midget Handjob ===
- Midnight Snack Break at the Poodle Factory (2000)

=== With Off! ===
- 1st EP (2010)
- First Four EPs (2010)
- "Compared to What" (2011)
- Live at Generation Records (2011)
- Sugar Daddy Live Split Series Vol. 3 (split with the Taylor's) (2012)
- Off! (2012)
- The Music of Grand Theft Auto V ("What's Next) (2013)
- Live at 9:30 Club (2013)
- Wasted Years (2014)
- "Learn to Obey" (2014)
- Live From the BBC (2015)
- The Metallica Blacklist ("Holier than Thou") (2021)
- Free LSD (2022)

=== Guest appearances ===
Year	Artist	Title	Credits		
1990	Bad Religion	Against the Grain	backing vocals on "Operation Rescue"		
1996	Tree	Downsizing the American Dream	backing vocals on "This Land"		
2001	Fu Manchu	California Crossing	lead vocals on "Bultaco"		
2002	Rollins Band	2025	Suburban Rebels Forever	Rise Above: 24 Black Flag Songs to Benefit the West Memphis Three	lead vocals on "Nervous Breakdown"
2003	Alkaline Trio	Good Mourning	backing vocals on "We've Had Enough"		
2004	My Chemical Romance	Three Cheers for Sweet Revenge	backing vocals on "Hang 'Em High"		
2004	Wrangler Brutes	Zulu	backing vocals on "Driving"		
2005	Turbonegro	Party Animals	backing vocals on "Wasted Again"		
2006	The Bronx	Social Club Issue No. One	lead vocals on "Witness (Can I Get A)"		
2008	Chingalera	Dose	backing vocals on "Twenty Three"		
2008	Klover	Dose	backing vocals on "Brain"		
2009	Trash Talk	East of Eden	backing vocals on "East of Eden" and "Son of a Bitch"		
2017	The Shrine	Never More Than Now	lead vocals		
2020	T.S.O.L.	Sweet Transvestite (single)	shared lead vocals		
