= Roadside Prophets =

1992 American comedy film by Abbe Wool

- DVD cover for the film
- Directed by: Abbe Wool
- Written by: Abbe Wool
- Produced by: Peter McCarthy; David Swinson
- Starring: John Doe; Adam Horovitz; David Carradine; John Cusack; Arlo Guthrie; Timothy Leary
- Cinematography: Tom Richmond
- Edited by: Nancy Richardson
- Music by: Pray for Rain
- Distributed by: Fine Line Features
- Release date: March 27, 1992
- Running time: 96 min.
- Country: United States
- Language: English
- Box office: $147,724

Roadside Prophets is a 1992 American comedy film written and directed by Abbe Wool, featuring musicians John Doe of the L.A. punk band X, and Adam Horovitz of the Beastie Boys with cameo appearances by, amongst others, Timothy Leary, Arlo Guthrie, David Carradine, Flea, an uncharacteristic performance by John Cusack as Caspar, a self-styled "Symbionese" rebel, and a very early film performance by Don Cheadle.

== Plot ==
Joe, a Harley-riding factory worker, meets Dave, who tells him about a casino in the town of El Dorado before Dave is electrocuted in a video arcade. Following Dave's cremation, Joe decides to travel to Nevada to find Dave's beloved casino and spread his ashes in the desert to fulfill his last wish. While riding his motorcycle around Nevada, Joe meets Sam, who is traveling on his own motorcycle to find the Motel 9 in which his parents committed suicide. As Sam travels with Joe, the two develop an unlikely friendship and encounter numerous eccentric people during their travels.

== Cast ==
- John Doe as Joe Mosely
- Adam Horovitz as Sam
- John Cusack as Caspar
- David Anthony Marshall as David Coleman
- Arlo Guthrie as Harvey
- Timothy Leary as Salvadore
- David Carradine as Othello Jones
- Don Cheadle as Happy Days Manager
- Flea as Two Free Stooges
- Dick Rude as Two Free Stooges
- Lin Shaye as Celeste
- Bill Cobbs as Oscar
- Stephen Tobolowsky as Ranger Bob
- JD Cullum as Mr. Andrews
- Aaron Lustig as Morning Desk Clerk
- Jennifer Balgobin as Ms. Labia Mirage/Prudence Kierkegaard

== Production ==
Filming locations for Roadside Prophets included Las Vegas, Valley of Fire State Park, and Jackpot, Nevada. Filming also took place in White Pine County, Nevada, including Ely and McGill. The film is named for the eccentric characters that are encountered throughout the story.

== Reception ==
Roadside Prophets was theatrically released on March 27, 1992, and grossed $147,724 during its run. On website Rotten Tomatoes, the film has an 83 percent rating.

Hal Hinson of The Washington Post wrote, "It's a sort of fairy tale, a '90s version of "Easy Rider," but it's so loosely strung together, so aimless and so willfully quirky, it gets lost in its own meanderings. Movies that try as hard to be hip as this one does are an arduous test of one's patience, mainly because the guise of hipness is merely an excuse for the writer-director […] not to bother himself with the basics of character, or motivation, or narrative sense. Things happen, without cause or explanation, and that's that, because to concern yourself with such trivialities would be too conventional, too, well, uncool."

Marc Savlov of The Austin Chronicle gave the film three and a half stars out of five, and praised the performances of Cusack and Horovitz. Savlov also praised the film's rapid pace: "New characters are introduced every few minutes, spit out a few gobbets of weirdness or disgruntled home brew philosophy, and then vanish from the story. Odd as it may sound, it works perfectly, and Wool's film ends up coming across like some sort of treatise on Nineties disaffection and a paean to following your heart and damn the torpedoes of logical lifestyles. It's a good message, and a wonderful film, the type of which I think we'll be seeing more and more of as the decade progresses.

Chris Hicks of Deseret News gave the film two stars out of four and wrote, "A quirky counterculture road picture, which is as aimless as its two protagonists, 'Roadside Prophets' is never quite sure what it wants to be . . . but it's very sure what it doesn't want to be. You'll find no run-of-the-mill, Hollywood happy-talk here. 'Roadside Prophets' is a talky picture, full of goofy introspective ideas, but it has no intention of developing any of them." Hicks stated that the film "has its moments, especially the bits by Guthrie and Cusack, who are gone almost before you realize who they are, and Doe demonstrates a natural acting ability as a disillusioned guy whose life is going nowhere. But the film just meanders pointlessly and some scenes are embarrassingly amateurish in their staging. It's like a home movie in some ways, and it's really not sharp-witted enough to attract anything more than a cult audience."

Andrea LeVasseur of AllMovie gave the film three stars out of five and called it a "lighthearted bit of Americana," and "decent-enough entertainment." LeVasseur further wrote, "This hipster road movie has three things going wrong for it right away: It's coming straight out of the self-indulgent early '90s, it features rock stars as leading men, and most of the other characters are just celebrity cameos. However bad it may seem, this heavy-handed lesson in pop philosophy is harmless enough. At the very least, it's good nostalgia for the grunge era. One major asset is the lovely young Adam Horowitz [sic] as the goofy tagalong sidekick Sam. He's not only a pleasure to look at, but he creates a nice balance with the brooding biker chic of John Doe. The story itself is pretty shallow and easygoing, despite recurring attempts to create deep, existential moments. But the plot is secondary to the good-natured mood and fondness for offbeat characters."

TV Guide gave the film two stars out of five, and called Doe's performance "fairly believable" but noted that Horovitz, "with his whining and goofy grin, seems as if he's about to break into a Jerry Lewis impression; he's more annoying than funny." TV Guide also wrote, "The lack of plot could be overlooked if the folks Sam and Joe met on their journey were remotely memorable, but almost every encounter is the same: they run into some eccentric for four or five minutes (sometimes shorter--don't blink or you'll miss Leary and Guthrie), Sam proclaims that they're insane and drives off." TV Guide concluded, "What could have been a fun, or at least uniquely weird journey is defeated by a lackadaisical screenplay and a lack of imagination. If only the film had been as lively as its soundtrack".
