= Earl Liberty =

- Born: Mark Vidal; September 4, 1960 (age 65)
- Origin: Los Angeles, California, U.S.
- Genres: Hardcore punk, punk rock
- Occupations: Musician, songwriter
- Instruments: Bass, guitar, vocals
- Years active: 1980–present

Earl Liberty (born Mark Vidal on September 4, 1960, in Redondo Beach, California) is an American punk rock bass guitarist and the son of Cuban conga drummer Carlos Vidal Bolado. He is known for playing bass for Saccharine Trust from 1980 to 1982, appearing on the South Bay/San Pedro-based band’s 1981 debut album, Paganicons, and touring with SST labelmates Black Flag. His stage name was coined when Minutemen's D. Boon declared "Jesus Christ, you're fucking huge! You're as big as the Statue of Liberty!" which was then wedded to his earlier nickname of "Earl."

Liberty joined Saccharine Trust when previous bassist Luis Maldonado left the band disenchanted with their move towards jazz. After two years with Saccharine Trust, Liberty was recruited by Circle Jerks lead singer Keith Morris while at a Bangs concert, as then-bassist Roger Rogerson wanted to move from bass to guitar. The band had also recently recruited Chuck Biscuits (formerly of D.O.A. and Black Flag). The addition of Liberty gave the group a fuller sound, but a few shows into their first tour as a five-piece, Rogerson departed, and the remaining members continued on the tour without him. Liberty played his last show with the Circle Jerks at Perkins Palace in Pasadena on April 21, 1984.

In the summer of 2016 Earl joined up with former Saccaharine Trust bandmate Rob Holzman and Guitarist John Mccree to form a Hermosa Beach local band One Square mile Later joining the group was Noel Neville of the Resolutions.

== Sources ==
- Blush, Steven (2001). American Hardcore: A Tribal History. Feral House. ISBN 0922915717.
- Ibarra, Craig (2015). A Wailing Of A Town: An Oral History of Early San Pedro Punk And More 1977-1985. END FWY. ISBN 978-0-9860971-0-2.
- Morris, Keith; Ruland, Jim (2017). My Damage: The Story of a Punk Rock Survivor. Da Capo Press. ISBN 978-0306825804.
