= Wonderful (Circle Jerks album) =

Studio album by Circle Jerks
- Released: 1985
- Recorded: Crystal, Hollywood, California
- Genre: Hardcore punk
- Length: 33:27
- Label: Combat
- Producers: Circle Jerks, Karat Faye

Circle Jerks chronology
Golden Shower of Hits (1983)	Wonderful (1985)	VI (1987)

Wonderful is the fourth studio album by the American hardcore punk band Circle Jerks, released in 1985.

== Critical reception ==
Professional ratings
Review scores
Source	Rating
AllMusic	2/5 stars
The Rolling Stone Album Guide	1.5/5 stars

The Daily Breeze wrote that the album "has the speed and energy that belies [Keith] Morris' disinterest in the punk scene, and the record showcases the band's outrageous sense of humor." The Los Angeles Times noted that "the new rhythm team of bassist Zander Schloss and drummer Keith Clark lends tight support to the slower, more heavy metal-ish tunes."

In an AllMusic review, Alex Ogg wrote: "The Circle Jerks were always a limited band that happened to cover the basics exceptionally well. However, Wonderful is the worst example of the treadmill approach to hard rock/punk that engulfed them in the mid-'80s. Greg Hetson and Keith Morris were trying out yet another rhythm section (Keith Clark and journeyman Zander Schloss), but the real fault lies in their gutless, inconclusive self-production and lackluster songwriting. Dodge this and opt for either their earlier or later work. The one saving grace is the cover artwork by Gary Leonard—featuring your heroes resplendent in tuxedos and cheesy smiles."

== Track listing ==
No.	Title	Writer(s)	Length
1.	"Wonderful"	Greg Hetson, Keith Clark, Keith Morris	2:20
2.	"Firebaugh"	Clark, Zander Schloss	1:37
3.	"Making the Bombs"	Harlan Hollander, Clark, Morris	3:24
4.	"Mrs. Jones"	Morris, Schloss	2:11
5.	"Dude"	Hetson, Schloss	2:24
6.	"American Heavy Metal Weekend"	Hetson, Clark, Morris	3:22
7.	"I, I & I"	Chris Desjardins, Tito Larriva	2:18
8.	"The Crowd"	Schloss	1:35
9.	"Killing for Jesus"	Bob Ricketts, Eddie Muñoz, Hollander	4:44
10.	"Karma Stew"	Schloss	1:32
11.	"15 Minutes"	Clark, Morris, Schloss	4:14
12.	"Rock House"	Hetson, Clark, Schloss	2:31
13.	"Another Broken Heart for Snake"	Clark, Mark Free, Las Palmas-La Canada Childrens Choir	1:15
Total length:			33:27

== Personnel ==
- Keith Morris – vocals
- Greg Hetson – guitars
- Zander Schloss – bass
- Keith Clark – drums, piano on "Another Broken Heart for Snake"

Guest musician

- Jamie Sheriff – strings on "Another Broken Heart for Snake"

Production

- Karat Faye – production, engineering
- Jim McMahon – assistant engineering
- Ken Perry – mastering
- Mark Weinberg – design
- Gary Leonard – artwork
- Peter Oliver – photography
