= Group Sex (album) =

Studio album by Circle Jerks
- Released: October 1, 1980
- Recorded: July 1980
- Studio: Byrdcliffe (Culver City)
- Genre: Hardcore punk
- Length: 15:25
- Label: Frontier
- Producers: Circle Jerks; Cary Markoff

Circle Jerks chronology
Group Sex (1980)	Wild in the Streets (1982)

Group Sex is the debut studio album by American hardcore punk band Circle Jerks. It was released on October 1, 1980, by Frontier Records. The album consists of 14 songs in 15 minutes and is considered to be a landmark album in hardcore punk.

== Background ==
The recording sessions for Group Sex took place in July 1980 at Byrdcliffe Studios in Culver City, California.

Four songs on the album – "Wasted", "Don't Care", "Behind the Door" and "Red Tape" – were originally co-written and performed by vocalist Keith Morris with his previous band Black Flag. "Wasted" had appeared on Black Flag's 1979 extended play Nervous Breakdown. "Don't Care" was recorded during an early recording session for what was supposed to be Black Flag's debut studio album. After Morris left Black Flag, the tapes were shelved. Black Flag's version of "Don't Care" later appeared on the 1982 compilation album Everything Went Black. "Behind the Door" was re-written and released as "Room 13" on Black Flag's 1981 debut studio album, Damaged. Morris and Circle Jerks drummer Lucky Lehrer collaborated on the arrangement of "Red Tape". In a nod to the latter's background as a jazz musician, the jazz principle of "trading fours" was co-opted by Lehrer in an effort to expand the narrow range of musicality that existed at the time in hardcore punk.

Morris recorded and released "I Don't Care" with the Circle Jerks without crediting Black Flag guitarist Greg Ginn, who composed the music. Black Flag responded by rewriting the lyrics, and then recording and releasing the song as "You Bet We've Got Something Personal Against You!" for the Jealous Again 12" EP, which was also released in 1980.

"Live Fast Die Young" is a reworking with new lyrics by Morris of "Cover Band", a song written and composed by Circle Jerks guitarist Greg Hetson (Note: According to Ken Salter, who played in a high school punk rock band called the Mongrels (1978-79) with Falling James Moreland of the Leaving Trains, Greg Hetson, who was in the group for only two weeks, stole the music of his song "Civilization" from 1978, which would be later used, first in Red Cross' song "Cover Band", recorded in October 1979, and subsequently in Circle Jerks' song "Live Fast Die Young", recorded in July 1980. According to George Hurchalla, author of Going Underground: American Punk 1979-1989, there's a demo recording that proves this.) for his previous band, Redd Kross, who recorded it for their 1980 EP Red Cross.

The title track was co-written by Morrison's friend Jeffrey Lee Pierce, as a payment in exchange for Morris naming Pierce's group The Gun Club.

Some CD versions feature the album twice given its short run time. The back cover acknowledges this simply as "program repeats" at the end of the track list.

== Artwork ==
The image used for the cover art of Group Sex is a stylized version by graphic designer Diane Zincavage of a photo taken by punk photographer Ed Colver after a Circle Jerks/Adolescents performance at the Marina del Rey Skatepark. Morris had seen Colver in the audience, and after the show, gathered the members of the crowd into the bowl of the skate park and asked Colver to take a picture. The photo features Casey Royer of the Adolescents; Circle Jerks bassist Roger Rogerson and his girlfriend at the time, Laura Bennett; and various other people of the California hardcore punk scene, two of them wearing Public Image Ltd shirts. Other audience members not appearing in the photo included Darby Crash and Lorna Doom of the Germs, Phoenix (aka Madame Jade), as well as Germs manager Rob Henley. Legendary skater Tony Hawk was present at the skatepark that night, but left just before the photo was taken.

== Reception ==
Professional ratings
Review scores
Source	Rating
AllMusic	4/5 stars
Robert Christgau	B+
The Rolling Stone Album Guide	3/5 stars
Ultimate Guitar	8.7/10

Group Sex was met with generally positive reviews and ratings at the time of its release. Robert Christgau gave it a "B+" (one of his highest ratings at the time) saying, "Like the Angry Samoans, although not as clearly or catchily, these slammers double-time metal riffs behind the rants, yielding such indelible plaints as "Deny Everything" ("I'm being framed"), "Paid Vacation" ("It's Afghanistan!"), and "Group Sex" (sensitive reading from the personals plus screaming title chorus)".

Retrospectively, the album has been called a classic of the hardcore punk genre. Decades after its release, Mark Deming of AllMusic would write, "As such things go, it's tight, reasonably well played, the songs kinda sorta have hooks, and Keith Morris is a pretty good frontman, but if you're looking for nuance, you're pretty much out of luck. Then again, if you were looking for nuance in a Circle Jerks album, you've obviously been misinformed as to how this punk rock stuff works".

== 40th anniversary tour ==
In November 2019, the band announced a tour to celebrate the 40th anniversary of Group Sex scheduled for the following year with the line-up of Keith Morris, Greg Hetson, and Zander Schloss joined by Queens of the Stone Age drummer Joey Castillo. This tour was to be the band's first since going on hiatus in 2011, but was postponed until September 2021 due to the COVID-19 pandemic. In April 2022, six dates were further postponed due to Morris testing positive for COVID-19.

== Track listing ==
No.	Title	Writer(s)	Length
1.	"Deny Everything"	Keith Morris, Roger Rogerson	0:26
2.	"I Just Want Some Skank"	Circle Jerks	1:09
3.	"Beverly Hills"	Morris, Rogerson	1:03
4.	"Operation"	Lucky Lehrer, Rogerson	1:28
5.	"Back Against the Wall"	Circle Jerks	1:32
6.	"Wasted"	Morris, Greg Hetson	0:41
7.	"Behind the Door"	Circle Jerks, Ginn	1:23
8.	"World Up My Ass"	Rogerson, Morris	1:14
9.	"Paid Vacation"	Circle Jerks	1:27
10.	"Don't Care"	Morris, Ginn	0:35
11.	"Live Fast Die Young"	Morris, Hetson	1:33
12.	"What's Your Problem"	Morris, Rogerson	0:57
13.	"Group Sex"	Jeffrey Lee Pierce, Circle Jerks	1:02
14.	"Red Tape"	Morris, Hetson	0:56
Total length:			15:25

== Personnel ==
- Keith Morris – lead vocals
- Greg Hetson – guitar
- Roger Rogerson – bass
- Lucky Lehrer – drums

Production

- Cary Markoff; Circle Jerks – production
- Cliff Zellman – engineering
- Ben Lesko; Ken Lauber – assistant engineers
- Frank DeLuna – mastering
- Diane Zincavage – graphic design
- Shawn Kerri – illustration (inner sleeve comic strip)
- Doug Drug – illustration, band logo
- Ed Colver – photography
- Mackie Osborne – new layout (1997 CD reissue)
