= Circle Jerks =

American punk band

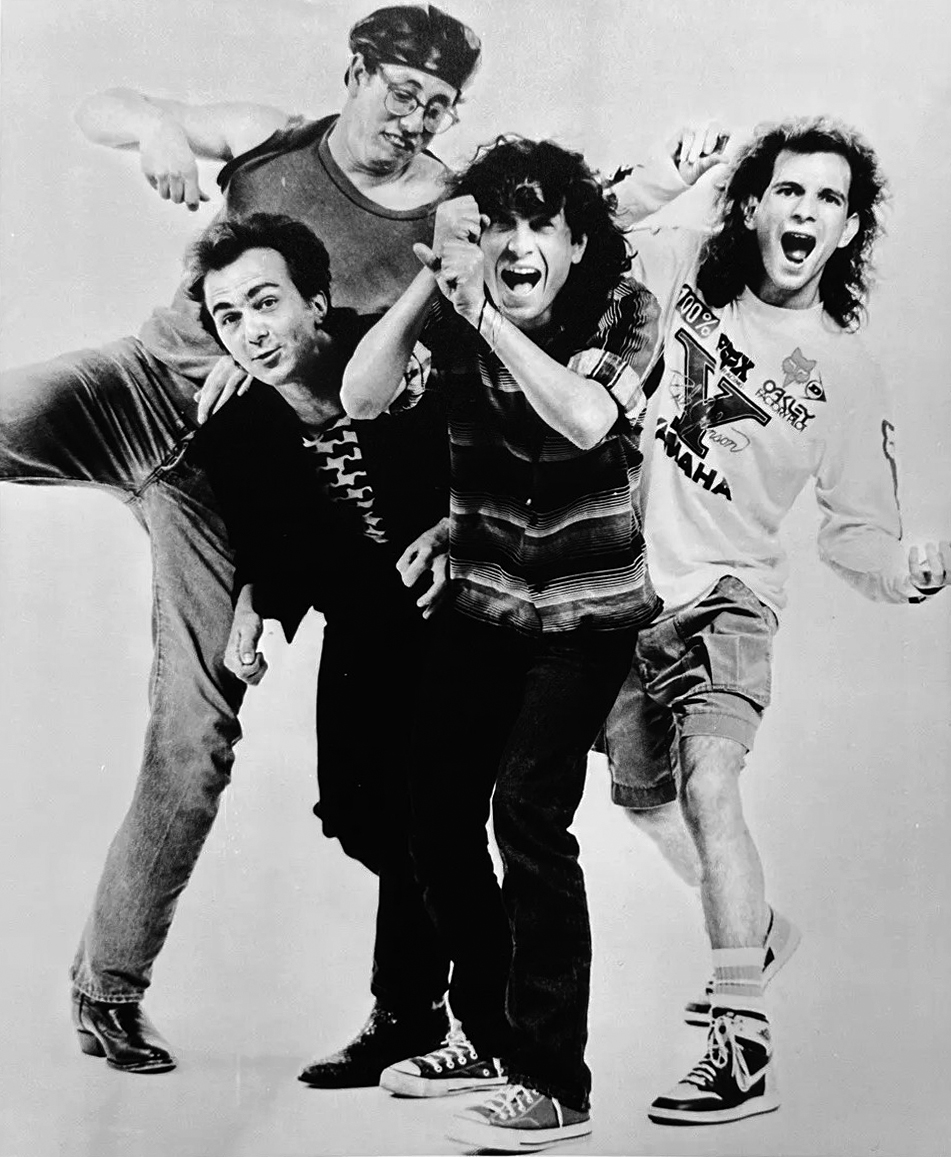
- Circle Jerks c. 1987. L-R: Zander Schloss, Keith Clark, Keith Morris and Greg Hetson.

Background information
- Origin: Hermosa Beach, California, U.S.
- Genre: Hardcore punk
- Works: Discography
- Years active: 1979–1990; 1994–1995; 1998; 2001–2011; 2019–present
- Labels: Frontier; Faulty Products; LAX; Combat; Relativity; Mercury
- Members: Keith Morris; Greg Hetson; Zander Schloss; Joey Castillo
- Past members: Lucky Lehrer; Roger Rogerson; John Ingram; Chuck Biscuits; Earl Liberty; Keith Clark; Kevin Fitzgerald
- Website: CircleJerks.net

The Circle Jerks (stylized as Ciʀcle JƎʀᴋs) are an American hardcore punk band, formed in 1979 in Los Angeles, California. The group was founded by former Black Flag vocalist Keith Morris and Redd Kross guitarist Greg Hetson. To date, the Circle Jerks have released six studio albums, one compilation, a live album and a live DVD. Their debut album, Group Sex (1980), is considered a landmark of the hardcore genre.

The band has broken up and re-formed several times, sometimes with different bassists and/or drummers. They disbanded for the first time after the release of their fifth album VI (1987), allowing Hetson to focus on Bad Religion (which he joined in 1984 and stayed with until 2013) full-time. The Circle Jerks first reunited in 1994 and released their sixth and last studio album to date, Oddities, Abnormalities and Curiosities, the following year before separating for the second time. The band reunited for the second time in 2001 and spent the next ten years performing live periodically; this reunion released only one new song, "I'm Gonna Live", which was posted on their MySpace profile in 2007. Tensions among members and failed attempts to record the follow-up to Oddities, Abnormalities and Curiosities resulted in the Circle Jerks breaking up yet again in 2011. However, the band announced in November 2019 that they would reunite in 2020 to celebrate the 40th anniversary of Group Sex with live shows.

Many groups and artists have cited the Circle Jerks as an influence, including the Red Hot Chili Peppers, Pearl Jam, Anti-Flag, Dropkick Murphys, the Offspring, NOFX, and Pennywise.

== History ==
=== Early days and increasing popularity (1979–1982) ===
Lead vocalist Keith Morris was an original member of Black Flag, co-founding the band with guitarist Greg Ginn and recording the Nervous Breakdown EP with them before suddenly departing the group in December 1979. Morris formed Circle Jerks as the Bedwetters along with guitarist Greg Hetson, bassist Roger Rogerson (a classically-trained guitarist) and drummer Lucky Lehrer (a jazz-trained drummer). Lehrer did not like the name the Bedwetters, so Morris looked through a dictionary of slang words and renamed the band the Circle Jerks.

The band's first recordings took place in spring 1980, including the original version of "Wild in the Streets", which appeared on Posh Boy's first Rodney on the ROQ compilation. In July of that year, the band recorded their debut studio album, Group Sex, which was released in October 1980 on the Frontier Records label; its 14 songs totaled just 15 minutes. The album featured several songs that Morris had written while in Black Flag. That same year, the group was one of several California punk bands to be immortalized in the Penelope Spheeris documentary The Decline of Western Civilization; live versions of five songs from Group Sex appeared on the movie's soundtrack.

In late 1980, the group signed with IRS Records subsidiary Faulty Products and recorded their second album, Wild in the Streets, released in 1982. The title track was a cover version of a song by Garland Jeffreys. Faulty Products ceased operations several months after its release, forcing Circle Jerks to seek their third record deal in as many years. While they regained the copyright to Wild in the Streets, the original stereo master tape was lost, forcing the band to remix it from the multi-track tapes when they reissued the album in 1988.

=== Later years (1983–1989) ===
Lehrer and the Circle Jerks mutually parted ways after Wild in the Streets so Lehrer could pursue a law degree. He was replaced by John Ingram. The band signed a management deal with War producer/manager Jerry Goldstein's Far Out Productions, and recorded their third album, Golden Shower of Hits, in 1983. The album was released on Goldstein's LAX Records label. The title track was a medley of six cover versions (of artists as diverse and unexpected as the Association, the Carpenters and Tammy Wynette) strung together to create a storyline of two people who fall in love, have an unplanned pregnancy, rush into marriage and end up divorced. Another song from the album, "Coup d'État", was used in the soundtrack of Alex Cox's 1984 film Repo Man, which the band appeared in, playing an acoustic lounge version of "When the Shit Hits the Fan", featuring new members Chuck Biscuits (formerly of Black Flag and D.O.A.) on drums and Earl Liberty (formerly of Saccharine Trust) on bass. Just prior to joining Circle Jerks at the suggestion of Biscuits, Liberty worked 10 weeks as a roadie for the Misfits as he became increasingly disillusioned with Saccharine Trust's lack of interest in developing new material, recalling in a 1983 interview that his former bandmates "were just getting too lazy."

Biscuits and Liberty were eventually replaced by Keith Clark and Zander Schloss (who also appeared in Repo Man), respectively. The band also changed labels for the fourth time, signing a deal with Relativity Records' metal imprint Combat Records, which had started a punk sub-label, Combat Core. The newly revamped group recorded Wonderful, released in 1985. Their newfound stability allowed the lineup to record a second album for Relativity, VI, issued in 1987. One track from VI, "Love Kills", had been commissioned by Cox for the soundtrack of the 1986 movie Sid and Nancy, and was heard in the film.

Chris Poland played bass with Circle Jerks briefly circa 1989 after being fired as guitarist for Megadeth (Schloss had left the band by that point).

=== Hiatus (1990–1993) ===
Circle Jerks dissolved in 1990 after Hetson left the band to continue recording with Bad Religion. Live recordings made during what would be their final tour at the time were immortalized in the live album Gig in 1992, their third and last release for Relativity.

During the hiatus, Hetson would continue playing in Bad Religion; Schloss played guitar and bass with various acts; Clark initially retired from music; Morris worked menial jobs and battled health problems (he had kicked a longtime dependence on drugs and alcohol in 1988).

=== Reunions and hiatuses (1994–2011) ===
A long period of inactivity for Circle Jerks ended in 1994, when the Wonderful-era lineup reunited and signed a major label deal with Mercury Records, a move that had a few business complications: Hetson was still with Bad Religion, who had signed a long-term contract with Atlantic Records, while Schloss had been part of a band contracted to Interscope Records. After ironing out these difficulties, the band recorded their final studio album to date, Oddities, Abnormalities and Curiosities, released June 20, 1995. One track on the album, a cover of the Soft Boys' "I Wanna Destroy You", featured backing vocals from pop singer/songwriter Debbie Gibson, who had just finished a solo album with the same producer that Circle Jerks were using. Gibson later made a surprise appearance at Circle Jerks' performance at punk mecca CBGB to perform "I Wanna Destroy You" with the band. Despite such media attention, the group suddenly imploded three weeks into a tour behind the album. The breakup would not be totally permanent, with the Jerks playing sporadically throughout the late 1990s, but Clark left music for good afterward. Original bassist Rogerson died in 1996 of a drug overdose. He was 41 years old.

Further Circle Jerks activity was suddenly held up when Morris announced that he had been diagnosed with adult onset diabetes in 1999. A multitude of punk bands held benefits on his behalf.

The core of Morris, Hetson and Schloss, with drummer Kevin Fitzgerald, continued to tour until 2011, in between other commitments — Hetson was still a full-time member of Bad Religion, Schloss played bass for the reformed first-generation LA punk band the Weirdos, and Morris was an A&R director for V2 Records until the label was suddenly shuttered by its owners in 2007.

In 2004, the Circle Jerks shot a live concert DVD as part of Kung-Fu Records' live DVD series The Show Must Go Off!, in which the band played songs from all six of their studio albums, plus – in nods to Schloss' other current band and Morris' first band, respectively – covers of the Weirdos' "Solitary Confinement" and Black Flag's "Nervous Breakdown". In 2005, Hetson formed another band, Black President.

In late February 2007, the band released their first new song since 1995 on their Myspace page, titled "I'm Gonna Live", adding more anticipation to the possibility of a new album emerging. However, in an April 2008 interview, guitarist Hetson admitted that Circle Jerks would not release any new studio material, saying that he does not know what will happen in the future, "but in the near future, no Circle Jerks stuff will come out".

Circle Jerks were featured on a television commercial for XM Satellite Radio (they were the first band played in the commercial, which included "Operation" from the album Group Sex), and the band also posted a cover of Germs song "The Slave" on their Myspace page.

The Circle Jerks played their final show for nearly a decade at the Bluebird Theater in Denver on January 27, 2011.

From 2011 to 2019, the Circle Jerks were on hiatus due to a dispute between Morris and the rest of the band. The conflict was over songs that were written by Morris and Dimitri Coats. Coats (from Burning Brides), who was supposed to produce a new Circle Jerks album, decided that the songs Hetson had written were not up to par with Circle Jerks' catalog. Morris agreed, and both he and Coats wrote multiple songs intended for the new album. The other members of Circle Jerks believed Coats to be "arrogant, overbearing, egotistical" and called for him to be fired from producing the new record. Morris disagreed, and he and Coats recruited Steven Shane McDonald (from Redd Kross) and Mario Rubalcaba (Rocket from the Crypt, Hot Snakes, 411, Clikatat Ikatowi, Earthless) to start a new band called Off!.

=== Group Sex anniversary shows (2019–present) ===
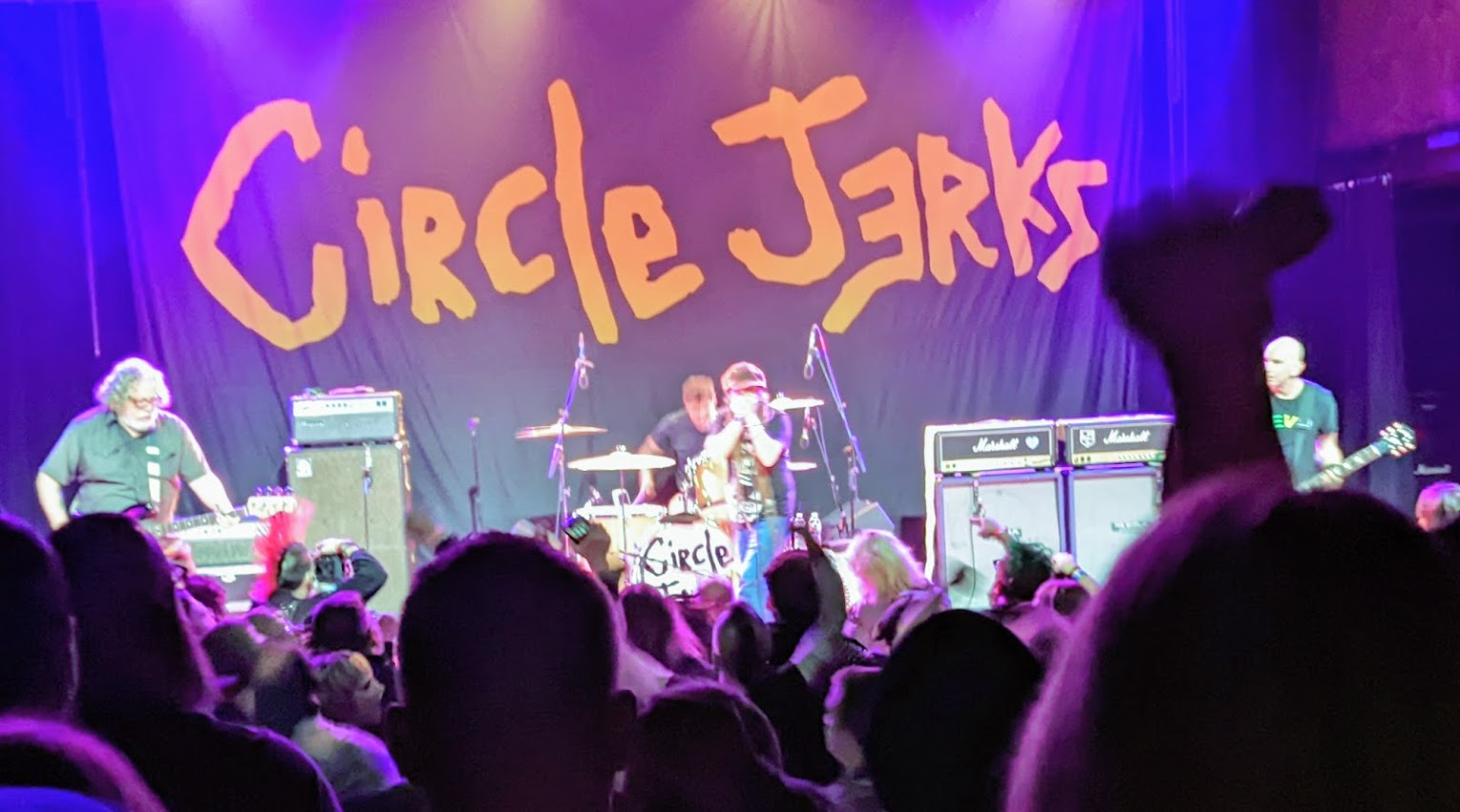
Circle Jerks performing in 2022

On November 22, 2019, the Circle Jerks announced that they were going to reunite in 2020 for a number of shows to celebrate the 40th anniversary of their debut album Group Sex, including that year's Punk Rock Bowling. However, the COVID-19 pandemic caused performances to be postponed until 2021. Three-fourths of the final lineup — Keith Morris, guitarist Greg Hetson, bassist Zander Schloss — were involved in the reunion.

On July 15, 2021 it was announced that former Queens of the Stone Age and Danzig drummer Joey Castillo would be joining the band on drums.

In April 2022, six dates on the anniversary tour were postponed after Morris tested positive for the COVID-19 virus. The band continued touring with the Descendents throughout North & South America in 2023 and 2024 and Europe in 2025.

In October 2026, the band announced their first new release of music in 31 years. An EP titled Revenge of Nervous Breakdown, it was a re-recording of the Black Flag EP Nervous Breakdown, which had featured Morris on vocals. The EP featured new artwork from longtime Black Flag artist Raymond Pettibon.

== Band members ==
=== Current ===
- Keith Morris – vocals (1979–1990, 1994–1995, 2001–2011, 2019–present)
- Greg Hetson – guitars (1979–1990, 1994–1995, 2001–2011, 2019–present)
- Zander Schloss – bass (1984–1988, 1989–1990, 1994–1995, 2001–2011, 2019–present)
- Joey Castillo – drums (2021–present)

== Discography ==
Studio albums

- Group Sex (1980)
- Wild in the Streets (1982)
- Golden Shower of Hits (1983)
- Wonderful (1985)
- VI (1987)
- Oddities, Abnormalities and Curiosities (1995)
