= Repo Man (film) =

1984 film by Alex Cox

- Theatrical release poster
- Directed by: Alex Cox
- Written by: Alex Cox
- Produced by: Jonathan Wacks; Peter McCarthy
- Starring: Harry Dean Stanton; Emilio Estevez
- Cinematography: Robby Müller
- Edited by: Dennis Dolan
- Music by: Steven Hufsteter; Humberto Larriva
- Production company: Edge City Productions
- Distributed by: Universal Pictures
- Release date: March 2, 1984
- Running time: 92 minutes
- Country: United States
- Languages: English; Spanish
- Budget: $1.5 million
- Box office: $2.3 million

Repo Man is a 1984 American science fiction black comedy film written and directed by Alex Cox in his directorial debut. It stars Harry Dean Stanton and Emilio Estevez, with Tracey Walter, Olivia Barash, Sy Richardson, Vonetta McGee, Fox Harris, and Dick Rude among the supporting cast. Set in Los Angeles, the plot concerns a young punk man (Estevez) who is recruited by a car repossession agency and gets caught up in the pursuit of a mysterious Chevrolet Malibu that might be connected to extraterrestrials.

A satire of America under the Reagan administration, consumerism and the Atomic Age, Repo Man was developed by Cox in partnership with his fellow film school graduates from UCLA, independent producers Jonathan Wacks and Peter McCarthy. His inspiration for the film came from his own experiences working with repossession agent Mark Lewis. Originally conceiving of it as a road movie, Cox reconfigured the story to take place mostly in Los Angeles to maintain its budget. Michael Nesmith of the Monkees came on board the project as an executive producer, and secured a negative pickup deal with Universal Pictures. Principal photography ran through summer 1983, during which Cox encouraged improvisation from the cast; the film's ending notably differed from what had originally been written. The soundtrack, headlined by a main theme composed and performed by Iggy Pop, is noted as a snapshot of 1980s hardcore punk; Cox wanted the music to underscore the life of repo men.

Despite a troubled initial release due to Universal's skepticism towards the film's commercial viability, Repo Man received widespread acclaim and many critics named it one of the best films of 1984. It has since gained a cult following, particularly surrounding Cox's re-edited version of the film for television due to its deliberate inclusion of surreal overdubs to replace profanity. A stand-alone sequel based on an unproduced screenplay by Cox, Waldo's Hawaiian Holiday, was published as a graphic novel in 2008, while a spiritual successor, Repo Chick, was released in 2009.

== Plot ==
In the Mojave Desert, a policeman pulls over a 1964 Chevrolet Malibu driven by J. Frank Parnell. The policeman opens the trunk, sees a blinding flash of white light, and instantly vaporizes, leaving only his boots behind.

Otto Maddox, a young punk rocker in L.A., is fired from his job as a supermarket stock clerk. His girlfriend leaves him for his best friend. Depressed and broke, Otto is wandering the streets when a man named Bud drives up and offers him $25 to drive a car out of the neighborhood, supposedly for his wife. Otto follows Bud in the car to the Helping Hand Acceptance Corporation, where he learns the car he drove was being repossessed. He refuses to join Bud as a "repo man" and goes to see his parents. After learning that his burned-out ex-hippie parents have donated the money they promised to reward him for graduating from college to a televangelist, he takes the repo job.

After repossessing a flashy red Cadillac, Otto sees a woman named Leila running down the street. He gives her a ride to her workplace, the United Fruitcake Outlet. On the way, she shows him pictures of aliens that she says are in the trunk of a Chevy Malibu. She says they are dangerous due to the radiation they emit. Meanwhile, Helping Hand is offered a $20,000 bounty notice for the Malibu. Most assume that the repossession is drug-related because the bounty is far above the value of the car.

Parnell arrives in L.A. driving the Malibu but cannot meet his waiting UFO compatriots because of a team of government agents led by a woman with a metal hand. When Parnell pulls into a gas station, Helping Hand's competitors, the Rodriguez brothers, take the Malibu. They stop for sodas because the car's trunk is hot. While they are out of the car, a trio of Otto's punk friends, who are on a crime spree, steal it.

After visiting a nightclub, Parnell appears and tricks the punks into opening the trunk, killing one of them and scaring the other two away. Later, he picks up Otto and drives aimlessly before collapsing and dying from radiation. After surviving a convenience store shootout with the punks that leaves Bud wounded and punk Duke dead, Otto takes the Malibu back to Helping Hand and leaves it in the lot. The car is stolen again, and a chase ensues. By this time, the car is glowing bright green.

Eventually, the Malibu reappears at the Helping Hand lot with Bud behind the wheel. The various groups (government agents, UFO scientists, and even the televangelist and his followers) trying to acquire the car converge on the lot, and Bud is shot by an agent in a helicopter. The glowing car resists anyone trying to approach it with arcs of electricity. Only Miller, an eccentric mechanic at Helping Hand who had explained earlier to Otto that aliens exist and can travel through time in their spaceships, can enter the car. He slides behind the wheel and beckons Otto to join him. After Otto settles into the passenger seat, the Malibu lifts straight into the air, and flies away through the city's skyline. Miller echoes Bud's line from earlier in the film: "The life of a repo man is ALWAYS intense", and the car catapults into outer space.

== Cast ==
- Harry Dean Stanton as Bud
- Emilio Estevez as Otto Maddox
- Tracey Walter as Miller
- Olivia Barash as Leila
- Sy Richardson as Lite
- Vonetta McGee as Marlene
- Richard Foronjy as Arnold Plettschner
- Susan Barnes as Agent Rogersz
- Fox Harris as J. Frank Parnell
- Tom Finnegan as Oly
- Del Zamora as Lagarto Rodriguez
- Eddie Velez as Napoleon "Napo" Rodriguez
- Zander Schloss as Kevin
- Jennifer Balgobin as Debbi
- Dick Rude as Duke
- Miguel Sandoval as Archie
- Helen Martin as Mrs. Parks
- Luis Contreras as Mr. Humphries' Security Guard
- The Circle Jerks as Nightclub Band
- The Untouchables as Scooter Gang

== Production ==
=== Filming ===
Numerous scenes were filmed around the Downtown Los Angeles, such as south of downtown in the Garment/Fashion District and southeast of downtown in the Arts District. Early in the film when Otto was walking along the tracks, the 4th Street bridge over the Los Angeles River was in the background. When Parnell and Leila are in nearby phone booths talking to each other, the scene is located at the corner of Wilson and Violet in Los Angeles.

== Reception ==
Repo Man garnered widespread praise upon its release, and is widely considered to be one of the best films of 1984. In 2008, the film was voted by a group of Los Angeles Times writers and editors as the eighth-best film set in Los Angeles in the last 25 years. (Note: There were two criteria: "The movie had to communicate some inherent truth about the L.A. experience, and only one film per director was allowed on the list".) Entertainment Weekly ranked the film seventh on their list of "The Top 50 Cult Films".

Roger Ebert of The Chicago Sun-Times gave the film 3 stars out of a possible 4, and wrote:

I saw Repo Man near the end of a busy stretch on the movie beat: Three days during which I saw more relentlessly bad movies than during any comparable period in memory. Most of those bad movies were so cynically constructed out of formula ideas and "commercial" ingredients that watching them was an ordeal. Repo Man comes out of left field, has no big stars, didn't cost much, takes chances, dares to be unconventional, is funny, and works. There is a lesson here.

Neil Gaiman reviewed Repo Man for Imagine magazine, and stated that "one of last year's cult movie successes was Repo Man [...] and it's not hard to see why. A lobotomised nuclear scientist is driving around Los Angeles in a car with something in the boot. Dead extraterrestrials, a neutron bomb or something even more bizarre?"

The review aggregator Rotten Tomatoes gives the film a 93% approval rating based on 54 reviews. The site's critical consensus reads, "Repo Man is many things: an alien-invasion film, a punk-rock musical, a send-up of consumerism. One thing it isn't is boring." On Metacritic, the film received a score of 82 based on 21 reviews, indicating "universal acclaim", and was given the "Must-See" badge.

== Accolades ==
Academy of Science Fiction, Fantasy & Horror Films

- Won – Saturn Award for Best Supporting Actor – Tracey Walter
- Nominated – Saturn Award for Best Writing – Alex Cox

American Film Institute Lists

- AFI's 100 Years...100 Laughs – Nominated
- AFI's 10 Top 10 – Nominated Science Fiction Film

== Soundtrack ==
The soundtrack features songs by various punk rock musicians such as The Plugz, Black Flag, the Circle Jerks, Suicidal Tendencies, Iggy Pop (with Steve Jones, Nigel Harrison, and Clem Burke as his backing band) and others. The film score was created by Tito Larriva, Steven Hufsteter, Charlie Quintana and Tony Marsico of The Plugz. Iggy Pop volunteered to write the title song after his manager viewed a screening of the film.

== Sequels ==
=== Waldo's Hawaiian Holiday ===
Chris Bones saw the script on Cox's website and asked, and received, permission to adapt the script into a graphic novel. The book, Waldo's Hawaiian Holiday, was released in March 2008 by Gestalt Publishing.

=== Repo Chick ===
On December 3, 2008, a sequel was reported to be going into development with the working title Repo Chick. The story would be set in 2008 and the resulting boom in repossession that extends far beyond cars and homes. On February 13, 2009, Cox announced on his blog that shooting had finished and the film was in post-production. The bulk of the film was shot in front of a green screen, with backgrounds filmed and composited-in during post-production.

== See also ==
- Generic brand
- List of cult films
