= Oddities, Abnormalities and Curiosities =

Studio album by Circle Jerks
- Released: June 20, 1995
- Recorded: 1995
- Genre: Punk rock
- Length: 34:21
- Label: Mercury
- Producer: Niko Bolas

Circle Jerks chronology
Gig (1992)	Oddities, Abnormalities and Curiosities (1995)

Oddities, Abnormalities and Curiosities is the sixth and final studio album by American hardcore punk band Circle Jerks, released June 20, 1995, by Mercury Records.

Oddities, Abnormalities and Curiosities was the band's only full-length studio recording since their 1990 disbandment and 1994 reformation, and also their only release on a major label. The reunion of the Circle Jerks did not last; after several internal problems and guitarist Greg Hetson's involvement with Bad Religion, they split up again but have since reunited on numerous occasions. The album moves away from the band's usual hardcore punk style and instead features a traditional punk rock style.

== Background ==
The album was produced by Niko Bolas, known for his work with Neil Young, Warren Zevon, Melissa Etheridge and Kiss.

"I Wanna Destroy You," a cover of a song by the Soft Boys, featured backing vocals from pop singer/songwriter Deborah Gibson, who had just finished a solo album with the same producer the Circle Jerks were using. Gibson later made a surprise appearance at a Circle Jerks performance at punk mecca CBGB to perform the song with the band. The video for the song was also featured on an episode of Beavis and Butt-Head.

The lyrics for "Dog" were taken directly from the opening monologue of the 1985 Lasse Hallström film My Life as a Dog, and referenced Soviet space dog Laika.

The cover art is a distorted photo of microcephalic circus performers Zip and Pip (Elvira and Jenny Lee Snow), who were famed for their roles in the controversial 1932 MGM film Freaks.

== Release and reception ==
Professional ratings
Review scores
Source	Rating
AllMusic	3/5 stars
Rolling Stone	2/5 stars
The Rolling Stone Album Guide	3/5 stars

In an AllMusic review, Paul Tinelli called it "an excellent hard rock album with few weak spots along the way." Steve Kuhn of the Washington City Paper criticized the cover of "I Wanna Destroy You" calling it "lackluster" and said "the remaining majority of Oddities, if not exactly revolutionary, is perfectly adequate." Rolling Stone gave the album three stars and called it "a perfectly respectable hard-rock album."

== Track listing ==
No.	Title	Writer(s)	Length
1.	"Teenage Electric"	Keith Morris; Zander Schloss	2:44
2.	"Anxious Boy"	Greg Hetson; Schloss; Morris	2:06
3.	"22"	Hetson; Schloss; Morris	2:43
4.	"Shining Through the Door"	Schloss; John Denney; Morris	3:02
5.	"I Wanna Destroy You"	Robyn Hitchcock	3:06
6.	"Sinking Ship"	Schloss; Hetson; Keith Clark; Morris	3:46
7.	"Brick"	Morris; Schloss	2:14
8.	"Fable"	Clark; Hetson; Schloss; Morris	3:38
9.	"Dog"	Morris; Daniel Rey	2:53
10.	"Grey Life"	Schloss; Dix Denney; Morris	2:49
11.	"Exhaust Breath"	Morris; Schloss	3:00
12.	"Career Day"	Clark; Morris	2:23
Total length:			34:23

== Personnel ==
- Keith Morris – lead vocals
- Greg Hetson – guitars
- Zander Schloss – bass, guitars, sitar
- Keith Clark – drums, backing vocals
- Dix Denney – guitars
- Suzi Gardner – backing vocals
- Debbie Gibson – backing vocals (on "I Wanna Destroy You")
- Niko Bolas – production, engineering, mixing
- John Paterno – engineering
- Brian Soucy – assistant engineer
- Paul Q. Kolderie & *Sean Slade – remixing
- Mary Hogan – production coordination
- Darrin Ehardt – art direction, design

== Sources ==
- Brackett, Bathan; Hoard, Christian David (2004). The New Rolling Stone Album Guide. Simon & Schuster. ISBN 9780743201698.
- Kuhn, Steve (August 18, 1995). "Oddities, Abnormalities and Curiosities". Washington City Paper.
- Morris, Keith; Ruland, Jim (2017). My Damage: The Story of a Punk Rock Survivor. Da Capo Press. ISBN 978-0306825804.
