= Sid and Nancy =

1986 film

- Theatrical release poster
- Directed by: Alex Cox
- Written by: Alex Cox; Abbe Wool
- Produced by: Eric Fellner
- Starring: Gary Oldman; Chloe Webb
- Cinematography: Roger Deakins
- Edited by: David Martin
- Music by: Joe Strummer; Pray for Rain; The Pogues
- Production companies: Embassy Home Entertainment; Initial Pictures; UK Productions Entity; Zenith Entertainment
- Distributed by: Palace Pictures
- Release dates: May 1986 (Cannes); 12 September 1986 (TIFF); 7 November 1986 (United States)
- Running time: 114 minutes
- Country: United Kingdom
- Language: English
- Budget: $4 million
- Box office: $2.8 million

Sid and Nancy (also known as Sid & Nancy: Love Kills) is a 1986 British biographical film directed by Alex Cox, co-written with Abbe Wool, and starring Gary Oldman and Chloe Webb. The film portrays the life of Sid Vicious, bassist of the punk rock band the Sex Pistols, and his destructive relationship with girlfriend Nancy Spungen. The film also features supporting performances from David Hayman, Xander Berkeley, and Courtney Love.

The film premiered at the Cannes Film Festival in May 1986, and was released theatrically in the United States in November of that same year. Although it failed to recoup its production budget at the box office, the film was received positively by most critics and developed a cult following.

== Plot ==
On 12 October 1978, police are summoned to the Hotel Chelsea in New York City, where they find Nancy Spungen dead. Her boyfriend, former Sex Pistols bassist Sid Vicious, is taken into custody. Sid is driven to a police station and told to describe what happened.

A little more than a year earlier, in 1977, close friends and band members Sid and Johnny Rotten meet Nancy, a heroin-addicted American groupie who had come to London to bed the Sex Pistols. Sid dismisses her at first, as her intentions are obvious, but begins dating her after feeling sympathy for the rejection she faces from fellow punk performers. The two swiftly bond over heroin use, and it is implied that Nancy introduces Sid to the drug.

Sid and Nancy fall deeply in love, but their self-destructive, drug-fuelled relationship frays Sid's relationship with the rest of the band. Nancy is distraught when Sid departs on a month-long American tour without her. The tour is notably disastrous, with Sid strung out of his mind, often drunk or on methamphetamine, and physically violent. Phoebe, Sid's friend and road manager, unsuccessfully attempts to help him stop drinking. Meanwhile, Nancy remains in London, staying with her friend Linda, a dominatrix. Although several of Sid's friends and acquaintances warn him of Nancy's devastating effect on his life, Sid stubbornly ignores these warnings. On 17 January 1978, in the midst of the group's American tour, the band breaks up.

Sid reunites with Nancy in New York City, and he attempts to start a solo career with Nancy as his manager. The two visit Paris to begin recording sessions, but the trip is unfruitful. Sid is quickly dismissed in the music industry as a has-been, and he and Nancy descend deeper into heroin addiction; Nancy also begins suffering from severe depression, and the couple eventually make a suicide pact. Nancy brings Sid to Philadelphia to meet her family, who are horrified by the couple's reckless behaviour and physical state. Sid and Nancy return to New York and settle in the Hotel Chelsea, where they live in squalor and depend on opiates supplied by their drug dealer, Bowery Snax.

Their love affair ends tragically one night when, during an argument in which Sid announces his plans to stop using heroin and return to England to restart his life, a suicidal Nancy begs him to kill her. She attacks him and they fight in a drug-induced haze, leading to him stabbing her, although whether it was intentional is left to interpretation. They fall asleep and later Nancy awakes and stumbles into the bathroom, where she collapses and dies, calling Sid for help. Sid is bailed out temporarily by his mother, who is also a heroin addict. After Sid wanders to a restaurant, some street kids convince him to dance with them. A taxi appears and picks Sid up, and he believes he finds Nancy alive in the back seat. The two embrace as the cab drives off.

A postscript says that Vicious died of a heroin overdose, and lastly reads: "R.I.P. Nancy and Sid."

== Cast ==
- Gary Oldman as Sid Vicious
- Chloe Webb as Nancy Spungen
- David Hayman as Malcolm McLaren
- Debby Bishop as Phoebe
- Andrew Schofield as Johnny Rotten
- Xander Berkeley as "Bowery Snax"
- Perry Benson as Paul Cook
- Tony London as Steve Jones
- Courtney Love as Gretchen
- Edward Tudor-Pole as UK Hotelier
- Kathy Burke as Brenda Windzor
- Sara Sugarman as Abby National
- Graham Fletcher-Cook as Wally Hairstyle
- Sy Richardson as Methadone Case Worker
- Anne Lambton as Linda
- Mark Monero as Jah Clive
- Biff Yeager as Detective
- Michele Winstanley as Olive McBollocks
- Andy Bradford as Dick Bent
- Peter Lee-Wilson as Duke Bowman
- Gloria LeRoy as Grandma
- Milton Selzer as Grandpa
- Iggy Pop as Prospective Guest
- Suchi Asano as Prospective Guest
- Fox Harris as Old Stain
- Barbara Coles as Reporter

== Production ==
=== Development ===
The idea for the film began with a 1980 screenplay entitled Too Kool to Die; a fictional story inspired by Nancy Spungen and Sid Vicious, featuring references to current English politics which Cox realised would make it unlikely to be financed. Four years later, after his directorial debut with Repo Man, Cox heard rumour of the possibility of a Hollywood film documenting the relationship of Spungen and Vicious, with Madonna and Rupert Everett in the lead roles - "For anyone who had been vaguely into the Punk movement, this was a troubling idea indeed", Cox wrote in his 2008 autobiography, and it motivated him to re-work his earlier script. "I felt an obligation to struggle against that project, fearing it would be even worse than mine."

Cox's film, originally titled Love Kills, is based on the mutually destructive, drug and sex filled relationship between Sid and Nancy. Nancy's parents, Deborah and Frank Spungen, wanted no part in a film depicting their child's death. (Deborah Spungen had already written a memoir about her daughter's life and death, And I Don't Want to Live This Life, published in 1983.) Sid's mother, Anne Beverley, initially tried to prevent the film from being made, but after meeting with Cox, decided to help the production, even lending Vicious' own heavy metal chain and padlock for Oldman to wear in the film. Some of the supporting characters are composites, invented to streamline the plot.

Sid and Nancy was a co-production with Zenith Productions (an independent film company in London) and Embassy Home Entertainment (a US-based distribution company). The screenplay was written by Alex Cox and Abbe Wool. Cox explained, "We did about four to six drafts... I interviewed a lot of people who had been involved in the scene... I met with [the Sex Pistols], but I didn't spend a lot of time with them. I met Glen Matlock, John Lydon and Paul Cook, but I never met Steve Jones." Cox claimed the film is "pretty accurate to how it all happened, I think. It's enhanced to make things more grandiose and dramatic at times, but it's faithful to the characters."

Work on the film was almost complete when the financers received a letter from a party claiming to own the title Love Kills and threatening legal action. Cox reluctantly changed it at lawyers' insistence, later describing the title Sid and Nancy as "bland". He apparently did like the title given the Mexican video version; Two Lives Destroyed by Drugs.

=== Casting ===
According to director Cox, he had originally considered Daniel Day-Lewis for the part of Sid Vicious; however, Cox offered Oldman the part of Vicious after seeing him play the lead role of Scopey in a 1984 production of Edward Bond's The Pope's Wedding. Oldman twice turned down the role before accepting it, because, in his own words: "I wasn't really that interested in Sid Vicious and the punk movement. I'd never followed it. It wasn't something that interested me. The script I felt was banal and 'who cares' and 'why bother' and all of that. And I was a little bit sort-of with my nose in the air and sort-of thinking 'well the theatre – so much more superior' and all of that." He reconsidered based on the salary and the urging of his agent. - "My agent at the time put a lot of pressure and bullied me into it", according to an Oldman interview, included in an early DVD version of the film. He lost weight to play the emaciated Vicious by eating nothing but "steamed fish and lots of melon", and was briefly hospitalised when he lost too much. Alex Cox stated, "Gary came from the same neighborhood as Sid, Bermondsey, and he had the same understanding and desire to escape, to create a new persona and life for himself. He was good to work with. It was one of his first films and he worked very hard." Oldman later dismissed his performance, saying: "I don't think I played Sid Vicious very well".

Courtney Love rang co-writer Abbe Wool and recorded a video audition for the role of Spungen. Cox was impressed by Love's audition, but has said the film's investors insisted on an experienced actress for the co-leading role. Therefore, instead, Cox wrote the minor role of Gretchen, one of Sid and Nancy's New York junkie friends, specifically for her benefit. Cox would later cast Love as one of the leads in Straight to Hell (1987). Chloe Webb, who had appeared in several small television roles at the time, was instead cast in the role of Spungen.

In his 2007 autobiography, Guns N' Roses guitarist Slash revealed that the casting director hired all five members of Guns N' Roses as extras for a club scene, having coincidentally scouted them in different locations without their knowledge. He said "all of us showed up to the first day of casting, like 'Hey...what are you doing here?'" However, Slash was the only one in the group to stay for the entire shoot.

Webb and Oldman improvised the dialogue heard in the scene leading up to Spungen's death but based it on interviews and other materials available to them. The stabbing scene is fictionalised and based only on conjecture. Cox told the NME: "We wanted to make the film not just about Sid Vicious and punk rock, but as an anti-drugs statement, the turbulent couple definitely falls into the depths of drug addiction."

The original music is by Pray for Rain, Joe Strummer, and The Pogues. A track by Tears for Fears ("Swords and Knives") was also recorded for the film but was rejected by the filmmakers for not being "punk" enough. The track later appeared on the band's Seeds of Love album in 1989.

Prominent musicians made appearances in the film including Circle Jerks, Love, Iggy Pop, Nico and Edward Tudor-Pole of Tenpole Tudor.

=== Filming ===
With principal photography lasting eleven weeks, Sid and Nancy was primarily shot in London and New York City, though additional photography (particularly the sequences of the Sex Pistols' North American tour) was completed in Los Angeles and El Centro, California.

Of the film's Director of Photography, Roger Deakins, Alex Cox recalled,

He was great. A great talent and a great guy to work with. We actually wanted to make the film in black-and-white. When it was clear we wouldn't be able to do it, we discussed how we could photograph the film in a monochromatic way at times, and how we could treat the print. Roger contributed some great ideas. There were two lenses he used on the movie - an 85mm and a 35mm. This was much more reduced than I would normally go for but it worked very well.

Regarding the film's rough cut, Alex Cox stated, "There was tons of material but I had a great editor in David Martin. The first cut of the movie was about three hours long. Everything that got cut out deserved to get cut out."

=== Soundtrack ===
The official soundtrack contains no songs by either the Sex Pistols or Sid Vicious (although it does include one song by former Pistol Steve Jones). Much of the film's soundtrack (as opposed to soundtrack album) was composed by Dan Wool (of Pray for Rain) and Joe Strummer, who was contractually limited to contribute only two songs. Strummer continued to contribute more (unpaid) work because of his interest in the project and composing for film in general. This additional material was credited to fictitious bands in the credits, so as to keep Strummer's label, Epic Records, from knowing what he had done. Another large portion of the music was composed by The Pogues.

Song	Artist
"Love Kills" (Title Track)	Joe Strummer
"Haunted"	The Pogues
"Pleasure and Pain"	Steve Jones
"Chinese Choppers"	Pray for Rain
"Love Kills"	Circle Jerks
"Off the Boat"	Pray for Rain
"Dum Dum Club"	Joe Strummer
"Burning Room"	Pray for Rain
"She Never Took No for an Answer"	John Cale
"Junk"	The Pogues
"I Wanna Be Your Dog"	Gary Oldman
"My Way"	Gary Oldman
"Taxi to Heaven"	Pray for Rain

== Release and reception ==
=== Critical reception ===
From the 71 reviews collected by review aggregator Rotten Tomatoes, the film received an overall approval rating of 87%, with the consensus: "Visceral, energetic, and often very sad, Sid & Nancy is also a surprisingly touching love story, and Gary Oldman is outstanding as the late punk rock icon Sid Vicious." Metacritic, which uses a weighted average, assigned the film a score of 76 out of 100, based on 22 critics, indicating "generally favorable" reviews. Roger Ebert gave Sid and Nancy four-out-of-four in his review for The Chicago Sun-Times, writing that Cox and his crew "pull off the neat trick of creating a movie full of noise and fury, and telling a meticulous story right in the middle of it." Appearing on The Late Show Starring Joan Rivers, Ebert said, to agreement from Rivers and applause from the audience, that Oldman "definitely won't be [Oscar] nominated – and should be", this being for the reason that "Hollywood will not nominate an actor for portraying a creep, no matter how good the performance is". In a subsequent article on Oldman, Ebert referred to the movie's titular couple as "punk rock's Romeo and Juliet." Richard Hell called the film 'depressing' and noted 'I'm glad to have outgrown those days'.

In his book Sid Vicious: Rock N' Roll Star, Malcolm Butt describes Webb's performance as Spungen as "intense, powerful, and most important of all, believable." Oldman's portrayal of Vicious was ranked #62 in Premiere magazine's "100 Greatest Performances of All Time". Uncut magazine ranked Gary Oldman as #8 in its "10 Best actors in rockin' roles" list, describing his portrayal as a "hugely sympathetic reading of the punk figurehead as a lost and bewildered manchild." In 2011, Total Film said of the performance: "It's an early high point in Oldman's varied career that showed just what the young actor was made of. Playing the part of an icon known and beloved by many comes with its own demands and risks, but Oldman more than rises to the challenge, completely transforming into the troubled punk bassist." The magazine described Oldman's rendition of "My Way" as "fantastic – [it] might even be better than Sid's original version." In 2003, Rolling Stone ranked Sid and Nancy as the third-best rock movie ever made, and in 2014, ShortList named it the ninth-greatest music biopic of all time.

Not all reviews of the film were positive. Leslie Halliwell reiterated a line from a review that appeared in Sight & Sound: "Relentlessly whingeing performances and a lengthy slide into drugs, degradation and death make this a solemnly off-putting moral tract."

Andrew Schofield was ranked #1 in Uncut magazine's "10 Worst actors in rockin' roles", which described his performance as Sex Pistols lead singer Johnny Rotten (real name John Lydon) as a "short-arse Scouse Bleasdale regular never once looking like he means it". Commentary on the Criterion DVD dismisses the film's portrayal of Lydon as wholly inaccurate. Paul Simonon of The Clash also criticised the movie for portraying Lydon as "some sort of fat, bean-slurping idiot."

Although not a box office success (generating $2,826,523 in the US on a $4 million budget), Sid and Nancy has become a cult hit; Yahoo! Movies described the film as a "poignant and uncompromising cult classic".

=== Subjects' reactions ===
Lydon commented on the film in his 1994 autobiography, Rotten: No Irish, No Blacks, No Dogs:

I cannot understand why anyone would want to put out a movie like Sid and Nancy and not bother to speak to me; Alex Cox, the director, didn't. He used as his point of reference – of all the people on this earth – Joe Strummer! That guttural singer from The Clash? What the fuck did he know about Sid and Nancy? That's probably all he could find, which was really scraping the bottom of the barrel. The only time Alex Cox made any approach toward me was when he sent the chap who was playing me over to New York where I was. This actor told me he wanted to talk about the script. During the two days he was there, he told me that the film had already been completed. The whole thing was a sham. It was a ploy to get my name used in connection with the film, in order to support it. To me this movie is the lowest form of life. I honestly believe that it celebrates heroin addiction. It definitely glorifies it at the end when that stupid taxi drives off into the sky. That's such nonsense... It was so off and ridiculous. It was absurd. Champagne and baked beans for breakfast? Sorry. I don't drink champagne. He didn't even speak like me. He had a Scouse accent. Worse, there's a slur implied in the movie that I was jealous of Nancy, which I find particularly loathsome. There is that implication that I feel was definitely put there. I guess that's Alex Cox showing his middle class twittery. It's all too glib, it's all too easy.

In a later interview, Lydon was asked the question, "Did the movie get anything right?" to which he replied: "Maybe the name Sid." Cox's attitude toward his subjects was negative; one of the reasons he was attracted to the project was that he was afraid that if someone else made it, it would portray its subjects as "real exemplars of Punk, rather than sold-out traitors to it." He acknowledged that Lydon's hatred of the movie was "understandable, given that it was based on incidents from his life and centred around one of his friends." Lydon claimed that drummer Paul Cook was more upset over the movie than he was, though the latter has not spoken publicly about it. In a 1987 interview on The Late Show when asked by interviewer Elayne Boosler about his thoughts on the movie, guitarist Steve Jones said: "For someone who didn't know anything about the Sex Pistols I guess it was a good way of describing it, but it's really hard for me to be judgemental of it because I was actually there at the time. I mean I didn't like the guy who played me. […] The only thing I liked about it was the way they portrayed where and how drugs take you. That was the best thing I thought about the movie". On his radio show, Jonesy's Jukebox in 2006, Jones said he "hated" the movie. He would later interview Gary Oldman on his show.

In Cox's own 2008 autobiography, he refuted Lydon's claim about not meeting before the film, stating that they enjoyed a 90-minute, alcohol-fuelled, discussion about the script, who should play 'Johnny Rotten', and other aspects of production. Cox stated that Andrew Schofield (who played Lydon in the film) also met with Lydon; and when Lydon noticed Schofield was a Liverpudlian, rather than a Londoner like himself, he encouraged Schofield to play the part as a Scouser, which Cox took as a sign that they agreed it would be better to portray a more fictionalised version of the characters, rather than a strictly accurate re-telling of facts. Cox said he then offered the role to Schofield the following day. He suggested that Lydon's alcohol consumption at the meeting could explain why Lydon did not recall the event.

=== Home media ===
Sid and Nancy was first released on DVD by The Criterion Collection in the late 1990s; this version has since gone out of print. Metro-Goldwyn-Mayer (the video distributor of the catalogue of Embassy Pictures, which released the film on VHS) released the film on DVD in 2000. The Criterion Collection released the film on Blu-ray and DVD on 24 August 2017.

=== Awards and nominations ===
Award	Category	Recipient(s)	Result	Ref.
BAFTA Awards	Best Make-Up Art	Peter Frampton	Nominated	
Boston Society of Film Critics	Best Actress	Chloe Webb	Won	
Evening Standard British Film Awards	Most Promising Newcomer	Gary Oldman	Won	
National Society of Film Critics	Best Actress	Chloe Webb	Won	
New York Film Critics Circle Awards	Best Actress	Chloe Webb	Nominated	
São Paulo International Film Festival	Critics Award	Sid and Nancy	Won	

=== Legacy ===
When Sid and Nancy was re-released to British cinemas for its thirtieth anniversary in 2016, Peter Bradshaw of The Guardian described the film as "Alex Cox's Beckettian masterpiece" and "a welcome corrective to bland punk nostalgia" and Ryan Gilbey of the New Statesman stated, "I have to say, on the evidence of how well it stands up 30 years after it was released, that Sid and Nancy has some claim on being the finest British film of the 1980s." Writing about the re-release of Sid and Nancy, Wendy Ide of The Observer stated, "Here is film-making as abrasive, bratty and antisocial as the characters it follows. And as such, it's a timely reminder of just how much the dangerous idea of punk has been defanged as it has been appropriated into the mainstream. Fascinating as a time capsule and as a showcase for the early work of the great cinematographer Roger Deakins, this love triangle between Sid, Nancy and the heroin that destroyed them both remains a gruellingly tough watch."

A more ambivalent assessment was made by David Jenkins of Little White Lies, who wrote in 2016,

It's strange that a movie about the band who embodied the filth and the fury of the punk movement should be a relatively clean-cut affair. Sure, Gary Oldman...brings as much as he can to the role of [Sid Vicious], but there's something just a little affected about his turn. The rivers of gob and the tipsy stumbling feel too much like a trained actor mimicking a real person, and then dialling a specific set of mannerisms up to as-yet-untested levels. Sure, it's compelling in the same way as watching a drunk man climb a scaffold is, but it's a distancing, revolting performance, a horror show of self-involved wretchedness which borders on the inhuman... [Sid's] sparring partner and bleach-blonde lovergirl is Nancy Spungen (Chloe Webb), potentially the most aggressively shrill character ever to be captured on film. Her regular Noo Yoik shrieks of "Siiiiiiid!!!" are like nails running down a blackboard while a hound-dog yelps in unison. It's quite a feat, as Spungen is presented as almost wholly unpleasant from the very first scene where she's seen as willing to do anything it takes for some drug money… There is a genuine fondness for the period recreation and the punk scene itself, but...Cox's film is best is as a hushed tale of lethargic amour fou... It's a solid film, and definitely interesting as biography. Yet it's the sequences where Cox allows his mind to wander – such as a dream sequence where Sid sings "My Way" and blast holes in the applauding audience – where the film comes into its own.

Interviewed in 2016, Alex Cox complimented "Some very good work by the actors, the cinematographers, the art department, and my co-author Abbe Wool," but described the film as "too long and the end feels bogus... We opted for a touchy-feely way out." Cox also admitted, "Looking back on it now I'm more sympathetic to [John] Lydon's point of view than ever," adding,

Film is a work of art. It should have freedom and liberty. I like the film when it deviates from the true story, for example: the depiction of the concerts. The concerts were never like that. When punks were playing in London the gigs were sparsely attended. There would be some skinny guys doing the punk pogo, but we recreated it like the mosh pits of Southern California: massive crowds of people in there, wading about, because that was what I was used to...

Asked what he would do differently had he remade Sid and Nancy, Cox stated,

I wouldn't have the happy ending, you know, the taxi to heaven stuff, because I think that's very compromised. It's sentimental and dishonest, because we were trying to make a film that condemned Sid and Nancy for their decadence. The punk movement was essentially a positive movement that was supposed to be forward-looking. You can't do that if you're a junkie rock star in a hotel room. The scene in the film that was the important one for my co-writer, Abbe Wool, and I was the scene where they go to the methadone clinic, and the character played by Sy Richardson gives them a lecture. He won't give them the methadone until he tells them that they've completely betrayed the movement and they've betrayed themselves. That was the point of the film, but I think that gets forgotten, and gets undercut by the quasi-happy ending. If I was to remake it, I would end it with Sid dying in a pool of his own vomit.

== See also ==
- List of cult films

== Sources ==
- Cox, Alex (2008). X Films: True Confessions of a Radical Filmmaker. Soft Skull Press. ISBN 978-1-59376-193-6.
