= Greg Hetson =

American musician

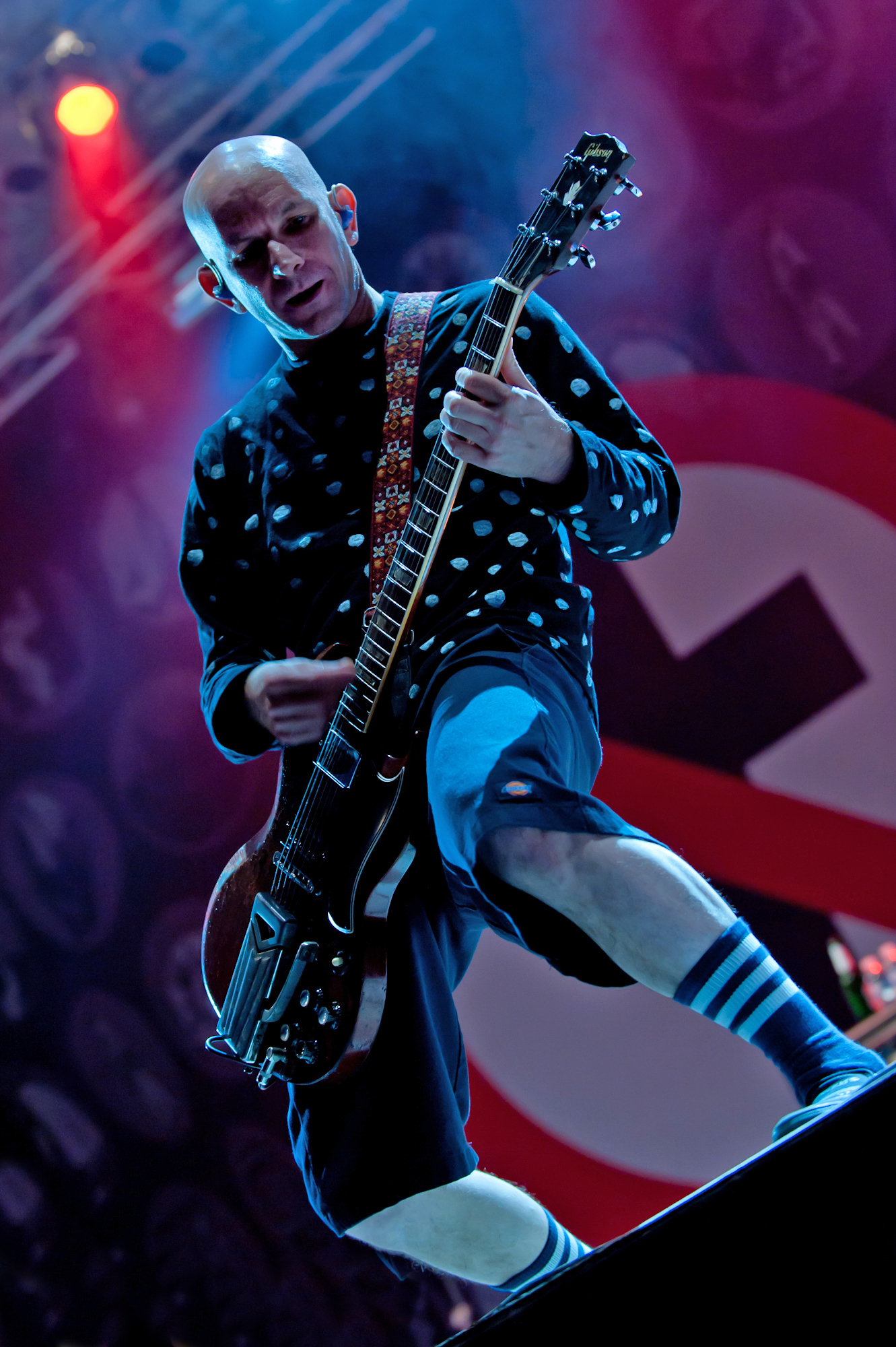
- Hetson performing with Bad Religion in 2010

Background information
- Born: June 29, 1961 (age 65); New York City, U.S.
- Origin: Hawthorne, California, U.S.
- Genres: Punk rock; hardcore punk; melodic hardcore; skate punk
- Occupation: Musician
- Instrument: Guitar
- Years active: 1979–present
- Labels: Epitaph; Atlantic; Sony Music/Dragnet; Porterhouse Records
- Member of: Circle Jerks; G.F.P.; Punk Rock Karaoke
- Formerly of: Redd Kross; Bad Religion; Black President; Rile 9 Collective

Greg Hetson (born June 29, 1961) is an American musician. He is best known as the guitarist for the influential punk rock bands Circle Jerks and Bad Religion. He is known for his high energy stage antics which people have coined the term "The Hetson Leap". Hetson was a founding member of and also plays guitar in another supergroup, Punk Rock Karaoke, and the hardcore punk band G.F.P.

== Career ==
=== The Circle Jerks ===
In 1980, Hetson abandoned his position as guitarist of the punk/alternative band Redd Kross to form The Circle Jerks with former Black Flag vocalist Keith Morris. Soon after, they released their debut LP, Group Sex and in 1980 were featured in the Los Angeles documentary The Decline of Western Civilization along with several other Los Angeles punk bands.

In 1982, The Circle Jerks released their second album Wild in the Streets. This album, while popular, did not sell nearly as much as their third LP Golden Shower of Hits, released in 1983.

While Bad Religion was on hiatus, the Circle Jerks continued touring and recorded two more albums (Wonderful and VI) before breaking up in 1990. However, they reformed in 1994 and released Oddities, Abnormalities and Curiosities, their last album to date, a year later. Hetson would continue to play for both Bad Religion and The Circle Jerks. Despite having not released a full-length album since 1995 (although they did release a new song, "I'm Gonna Live", on MySpace in 2007), the Circle Jerks have been playing live occasionally over the years, with the exception of two more hiatuses, one from 1995 to 2001, and another from 2011 to 2019. In 2019 the band announced plans for a 2020 tour to celebrate the 40th anniversary of Group Sex however the tour was postponed until 2021 due to the COVID-19 pandemic. In 2023 and 2024, Circle Jerks toured with Descendents.

=== Bad Religion ===
Greg Hetson was credited on Bad Religion's album How Could Hell Be Any Worse? for playing the solo for the song Part III. His first (official) release with Bad Religion was the Back to the Known EP, released in 1985, which declared the band's return to their original punk sound after releasing the highly unsuccessful, progressive rock album Into the Unknown, after which the band disbanded.

After the release of Back to the Known, Bad Religion broke up for a second time, but reformed in 1986 with the How Could Hell Be Any Worse? line-up and Hetson was included. Bad Religion recorded their first three highly acclaimed reunion albums, Suffer, No Control and Against the Grain, before drummer Pete Finestone quit the band in 1991.

Bad Religion replaced Finestone with Bobby Schayer, then recorded their next album, Generator. The album was completed in the spring of 1991, but the band was forced to delay its release until a year later. For the album, Bad Religion also filmed their first music video "Atomic Garden", which was also their first song to be released as a single. In 1993, the band left their original label Epitaph Records and signed to Atlantic Records, who released their next album Recipe for Hate. While moderately successful, this was the first Bad Religion album to reach any Billboard charts and two videos for the album, "American Jesus" and "Struck a Nerve", were made.

The band's popularity grew in 1994 with their widely successful album Stranger Than Fiction, including their well-known hits "Infected" and "21st Century (Digital Boy)", which are often considered concert staples. After the album was completed, longtime guitarist Brett Gurewitz soon left Bad Religion to concentrate on the future of Epitaph, citing the increasing amount of time he was spending at Epitaph's offices as The Offspring became one of the biggest bands of the mid-1990s, but it was well known that his departure was not on good terms.

Gurewitz was replaced by former Minor Threat/Dag Nasty guitarist Brian Baker and Bad Religion recorded three more albums without him. He returned to the band in 2001, the line-up consisting of Greg Graffin (vocals), Gurewitz, Hetson, Baker (all on guitar), Jay Bentley (bass) and Brooks Wackerman (drums).

In April 2013, Hetson stopped touring with Bad Religion, supposedly due to divorce, and after briefly playing as a four-piece band (as Gurewitz does not tour with the band due to his commitments with Epitaph), Bad Religion recruited Mike Dimkich of The Cult to fill in for Hetson. Bassist Jay Bentley released the following statement: "Greg Hetson is dealing with some personal issues, if he wishes to make a statement we will support that, if he chooses not to we will support that. Mike Dimkich is indeed helping us out right now, and we are genuinely appreciative. Right now we are just looking forward and getting ready to play our shows." In January 2014, Bentley confirmed that Dimkich is an official member of Bad Religion, meaning that Hetson is no longer a member of the band. In April 2014, Hetson tweeted that he is no longer in Bad Religion, later claiming he was "kicked out" of the band. Singer Greg Graffin writes in his autobiography that Hetson's membership of the band was "revoked" but states no reasons why as he claims that decision was made largely without his input.

=== Punk Rock Karaoke ===
Hetson plays guitar in the all star band Punk Rock Karaoke with Eric Melvin of NOFX, and Steve Soto of The Adolescents, Stan Lee of The Dickies and original Goldfinger drummer Darrin Pfeiffer. Other notable past and recurring members have included Bob Mothersbaugh of Devo, and Mike Watt of Minutemen, Iggy and the Stooges. It was the first interactive live Punk Karaoke band since 1996. The band released DVD/CD set on MVD which has "sing along with" videos as well as a covers album featuring singers such as Matt Skiba, Dave King and Mike Herrera.

=== New Musical Project ===
Hetson is currently working with Loomis Fall, on a side project which include guests Bobby Alt, Chris Vrenna, Christopher Chartrand and engineered by Josh Achziger, though no release date has been stated.
