= Lucky Lehrer =

American musician (born 1958)

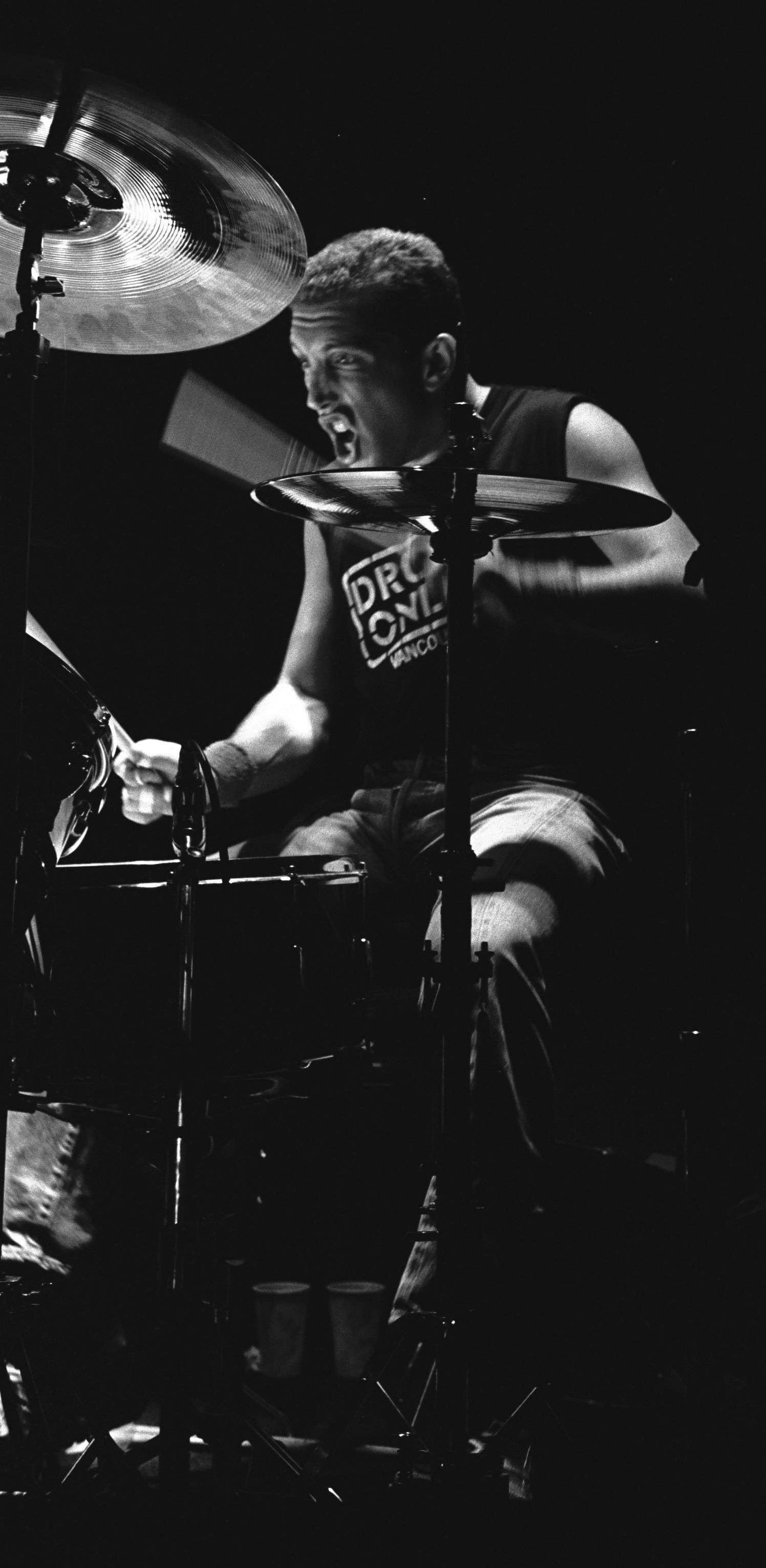
- Lehrer performing in 1981

Background information
- Born: Keith Lehrer; April 18, 1958 (age 68); New York City, New York, United States
- Origin: Los Angeles, California, United States
- Genres: Hardcore punk, punk rock, jazz (early)
- Occupation: Drummer
- Years active: 1977–present
- Formerly of: Circle Jerks; Darby Crash Band; Bad Religion; LA's Wasted Youth; Redd Kross

Keith "Lucky" Lehrer (born April 18, 1958) is a drummer from Los Angeles, California associated with several influential LA punk rock bands. He was originally trained in jazz then played in a number of LA punk rock bands, particularly the Circle Jerks, Redd Kross, Bad Religion, Darby Crash Band and LA's Wasted Youth, among others. Lehrer also appeared in three notable documentary films charting the punk rock music scene. He is the brother of LA's Wasted Youth guitarist Chett Lehrer. Lehrer also teaches drums, with notable students being future Bad Religion drummers Pete Finestone and Bobby Schayer. He was an early developer of hardcore punk drumming and he has been called the "Godfather of hardcore drumming". Lehrer was voted the best punk drummer of all time by fanzine Flipside.

== Career ==
=== Early life ===
Lucky credits his early music start to his mother, who died of cancer. "I quit guitar after 6 weeks and she let me try the drums. Years later, she said that all the racket in the house from hours of practicing drums never bothered her," Lucky remembers. Early birthdays were spent at venues like Shelly's Manne Hole watching Louie Bellson, or at the Brass Ring, where young Lucky got so close to his idol, Buddy Rich, he quipped "get outta here kid, you bother me." They visited jazz clubs until his mother died, such as Jaxx, Vibrato and La Ve Lee, where Lucky met his mentor, Los Angeles session drummer Joey Heredia.

He attributes his innovative, syncopated style to his interpretation of jazz and Latin drumming in a crash collision with speed metal. Early inspirations include jazz legends Buddy Rich and Max Roach. Later influences involve Led Zeppelin drummer John Bonham, session and Flamenco drummer Joey Heredia, and teaching pioneer Murray Spivak. Alternative Press said his jazz influence gave the band a "liquid rhythmic pulse and vicious swing, even as he pushed them well past any land-speed records."

== Equipment ==
=== Drums ===
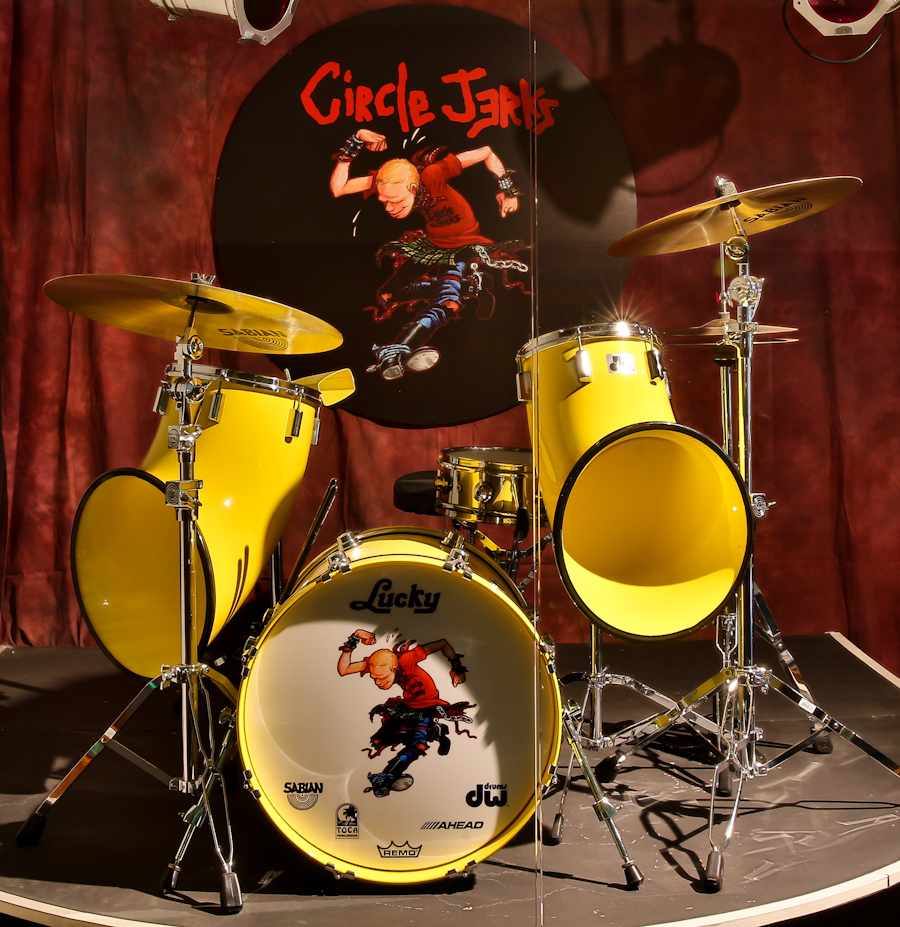
Lucky Lehrer drums at Hard Rock Casino LV

Lucky has a long-time relationship with Drum Workshop (DW) which designed a custom "Speed Demon" kit in 6 ply maple shells that's finished in "Caution" yellow. The kit features a pair of 10" and 12" Piccolo Toms DW designed in conjunction with Terry Bozzio that are positioned in lieu of a floor tom. The standard mounted "rack" tom tom is 10" in diameter (8" in depth). For touring, Lucky uses a 24" diameter bass drum (18" depth) but prefers a smaller drum for recording. For live shows, he uses a one-off prototype 13" diameter custom concrete snare drum by DW (6" in depth) that was a personal gift from DW Senior V.P. John Good. All hardware is heavy duty DW.

Lucky uses a variety of DW drum heads made by Remo. On the batter side of his snare drum, a coated Remo Powerstroke 3; DW Clear Pinstripes on the batter sides of toms, and coated, white Ambassador-type drum heads for the resonant sides. He uses a Pinstripe on the bass drum. The front is a logo head by Remo with a special hole pattern developed by John Good of DW.

=== Sticks ===
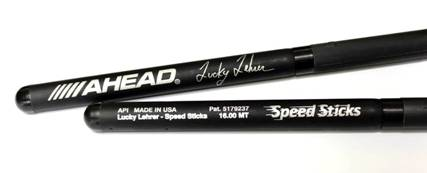
Lucky Lehrer Signature Speed Stick

The Lucky Lehrer signature Speed Stick by Ahead that is distributed by Big Bang Percussion is designed to be lighter to support faster playing. It is made from a composite material. Cymbals

In 2013 Lucky disbanded a long association with Zildjian and joined the roster of sponsored Sabian artists. He added more cymbals both to his live and studio drum kits, currently playing Sabian 16" AAX X-Plosion hi-hats remotely mounted to on a DW x-stacker. He also includes a 10" Sabian O-zone on a kit featuring a 20" AA Metal X-ride and two 16" Sabian crash cymbals and 14" AAX Fusion Hi-hats.

== Political views ==
Lehrer is a supporter of marijuana legalization and decriminalization. He states that the current US system, with different states having different laws is arbitrary, because a person found with marijuana in one state faces no penalties, but goes to jail for the same amount in a different state. He states that marijuana is less dangerous than the combination of alcohol and pills that killed Led Zeppelin's John Bonham and The Who's Keith Moon.

== Film appearances ==
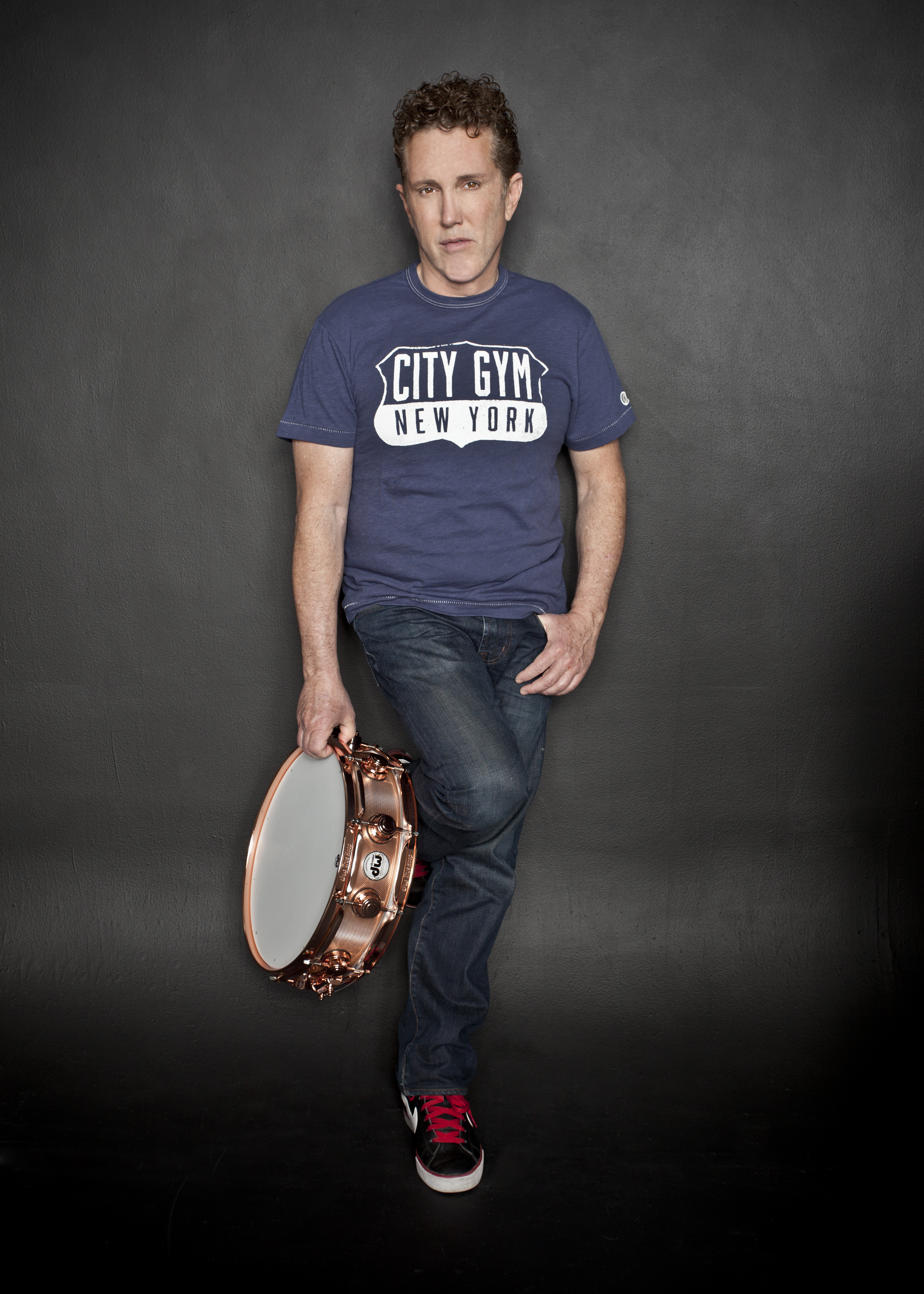
Lehrer in 2014

- The Decline of Western Civilization (1981)
- The Slog Movie (1981)
- American Hardcore (2006)
- My Career As A Jerk (2012)
