= Joe Strummer 001 =

Compilation album by Joe Strummer
- Released: 28 September 2018
- Genre: Alternative rock; reggae rock; punk rock
- Label: Ignition
- Producer: Robert Gordon McHarg III

Joe Strummer chronology
Global a Go-Go (2001)	Joe Strummer 001 (2018)

Singles from Joe Strummer 001
- 1. "London Is Burning"; 2. "Rose of Erin"

Joe Strummer 001 is a career-spanning compilation album by the English musician Joe Strummer. The 32 song album was released on 28 September 2018 by Ignition Records and features 12 previously unreleased songs, as well as known favourites from his recordings with the 101ers, the Mescaleros and his extensive soundtrack work along with alternate versions of previously released songs. The album was preceded by the singles "London Is Burning", one of the last songs Strummer recorded before his death in 2002 (an alternative version titled "Burnin' Street" was posthumously released on Strummer's final studio album, 2003's Streetcore), and "Rose of Erin", an unreleased song used in the 1993 film When Pigs Fly.

== Background ==
Following Strummer's death in December 2002, it was discovered that Strummer had barns full of writings and tapes stored in his back garden. There are now over 20,000 items in the Joe Strummer Archive. The archiving of this material and compiling of Joe Strummer 001 was overseen by Strummer's widow, Lucinda Tait, and compilation producer Robert Gordon McHarg III.

All tracks were restored and mastered by Grammy Award winner Peter J. Moore at the E. Room in Toronto, Canada. Upon going through cassettes and recording tapes it was discovered that Strummer was rather frugal and keen on hiding tracks. On cassettes he would leave 20 minutes between songs. On the 1-inch 8-track recordings it was discovered there were hidden tracks superimposed onto each other. For example, tracks 1–4 were taken by one song and tracks 5–8 by two other songs which were thought, when played back, to be caused by tape dedgradation until the tapes went to Moore, who was able to separate one song from another.

== Track listing ==
=== Disc one ===
1. "Letsagetabitarockin'" — 2:08
  - The 101ers (2005 remastered version originally released on Elgin Avenue Breakdown)
2. "Keys to Your Heart (Version 2)" — 3:08
  - The 101ers (2005 remastered version originally released on Elgin Avenue Breakdown)
3. "Love Kills" — 3:59
  - (Originally released on the soundtrack to the 1986 film Sid and Nancy)
4. "Tennessee Rain" — 2:55
  - (Originally released on the soundtrack to the 1987 film Walker)
5. "Trash City" — 4:11
  - Joe Strummer & The Latino Rockabilly War (Originally released on the soundtrack to the 1988 film Permanent Record)
6. "15th Brigade" — 2:40
7. "Ride Your Donkey" — 2:21
  - Joe Strummer & The Latino Rockabilly War (Originally released the 1989 album Earthquake Weather)
8. "Burning Lights" — 2:43
  - (Originally featured in the 1990 film I Hired a Contract Killer)
9. "Afro-Cuban Be-Bop" — 2:53
  - The Astro-Physicians (Joe Strummer with The Pogues)
10. "Sandpaper Blues" — 4:44
  - Radar (Released as by Joe Strummer and the Mescaleros on the 1999 album Rock Art and the X-Ray Style)
11. "Generations" — 4:44
  - Electric Dog House (Originally released on the 1997 compilation album Generations 1: A Punk Look at Human Rights)
12. "It's a Rockin' World" — 2:25
  - (Originally released on the 1998 album Chef Aid: The South Park Album)
13. "Yalla Yalla" — 6:57
  - Joe Strummer and the Mescaleros (Originally released on the 1999 album Rock Art and the X-Ray Style)
14. "X-Ray Style" — 4:34
  - Joe Strummer and the Mescaleros (Originally released on the 1999 album Rock Art and the X-Ray Style)
15. "Johnny Appleseed" — 4:02
  - Joe Strummer and the Mescaleros (Originally released on the 2001 album Global a Go-Go)
16. "Minstrel Boy" — 5:42
  - Joe Strummer and the Mescaleros (Version with Lyrics - Originally released on the 2001 soundtrack for the film Black Hawk Down)
17. "Redemption Song" — 3:24
  - Johnny Cash and Joe Strummer (Originally released on Cash's 2003 box set Unearthed)
18. "Over the Border" — 3:51
  - Jimmy Cliff and Joe Strummer (Originally released on Cliff's 2004 album Black Magic)
19. "Coma Girl" — 3:48
  - Joe Strummer and the Mescaleros (Originally released on the 2003 album Streetcore)
20. "Silver and Gold" — 2:39
  - Joe Strummer and the Mescaleros (Originally released on the 2003 album Streetcore)

=== Disc two ===
1. "Letsagetabitarockin'" — 1:49
  - Joe Strummer (Unreleased demo)
2. "Czechoslovak Song/Where Is England" — 3:49
  - The Clash (Unreleased version of "This is England")
3. "Pouring Rain (1984)" — 3:29
  - (Unreleased)
4. "Blues on the River" — 4:37
  - (Unreleased)
5. "Crying on 23rd" — 2:52
  - The Soothsayers (Unreleased)
6. "2 Bullets" — 3:11
  - Pearl Harbor (Unreleased)
7. "When Pigs Fly" — 4:06
  - (Song from the 1993 unreleased soundtrack for the film When Pigs Fly)
8. "Pouring Rain (1993)" — 4:06
  - (Song from the 1993 unreleased soundtrack for the film When Pigs Fly)
9. "Rose of Erin" — 4:12
  - (Song from the 1993 unreleased soundtrack for the film When Pigs Fly)
10. "The Cool Impossible" - 4:32
  - (Unreleased, one of the final songs Strummer recorded)
11. "London Is Burning" - 4:32
  - Joe Strummer and the Mescaleros (Unreleased, one of the final songs Strummer recorded, alternate version of "Burnin' Streets" from the 2003 album Streetcore)
12. "U.S. North" - 10:32
  - Joe Strummer and Mick Jones (Unreleased song intended for the movie Candy Mountain)

=== Box set ===
A super deluxe boxset with Wibalin wrap, containing both the deluxe CD book as well as the 4LP vinyl product will also be released. The box set will contain three demos that are exclusives to this set.

- 2CDs and 4LPs containing rare and unheard audio - restored and remastered by Peter J Moore.
- 64-page hardback book featuring rarely seen and previously unpublished memorabilia from Joe's personal collection as well as historical press reviews and technical notes about the albums.
- Additional 7-inch (180 mm) single of previously unreleased demos of "This Is England" (Side A) and "Before We Go Forward" (Side B)
- Cassette of previously unheard and unreleased "Full Moon (Basement Demo)" - with artwork replicated from the original cassette recording from Joes's archive. Originally, this was going to be a cassette with a second demo of US North called "US North (Basement Demo)". However, the people responsible for the compilation vetoed this decision and replaced it with Full Moon.
- Envelope containing a screen print, a high-quality image of Joe, two original art prints, and a sticker sheet.
- Replica of Joe's Californian driving license.
- Enamel Pin badge
1. "This Is England"
  - The Clash (Unreleased demo included only in the limited edition deluxe set on 7" vinyl)
2. "Before We Go Forward" - 2:49
  - The Clash (Unreleased demo included only in the limited edition deluxe set on 7" vinyl)
3. "Full Moon" - 3:02
  - (Unreleased basement demo included only in the limited edition deluxe set as a cassette single)

== Charts ==
Chart (2018)	Peak position
Belgian Albums (Ultratop Flanders)	145
Belgian Albums (Ultratop Wallonia)	98
German Albums (Offizielle Top 100)	68
Irish Albums (IRMA)	93
Italian Albums (FIMI)	90
Scottish Albums (OCC)	11
Spanish Albums (PROMUSICAE)	27
UK Albums (OCC)	30
UK Independent Albums (OCC)	5
US Top Current Albums (Billboard)	100
US Independent Albums (Billboard)	27
US Top Alternative Album Sales (Billboard)	17
US Top Rock Album Sales (Billboard)	37
