= Joe Strummer: The Future Is Unwritten =

- Directed by: Julien Temple
- Produced by: Anna Campeau; Alan Moloney; Amanda Temple; Orlagh Collins; Stephan Mallmann; Susan Mullen
- Cinematography: Ben Cole
- Edited by: Mark Reynolds; Tobias Zaldua
- Music by: Ian Neil; Steve Isles; Amanda Street
- Distributed by: Vertigo Films
- Release date: 20 January 2007 (Sundance Film Festival)
- Running time: 123 minutes (Sundance Film Festival)
- Countries: Ireland; United Kingdom
- Language: English

Joe Strummer: The Future Is Unwritten is a 2007 documentary film directed by Julien Temple about Joe Strummer, the lead singer of the British punk rock band the Clash, that went on to win the British Independent Film Awards as Best British Documentary 2007. The film premiered 20 January 2007 at the 2007 Sundance Film Festival. It was also shown at the Dublin Film Festival on 24 February 2007. It was released in the United Kingdom on 18 May 2007 and in Australia on 31 August 2007. The film opened in limited release in the United States on 2 November 2007.

== Cast ==
- Brigitte Bardot as Herself (archive footage)
- Flea as Himself
- Bono as Himself
- Steve Buscemi as Himself
- Terry Chimes as Himself
- John Cooper Clarke as Himself
- John Cusack as Himself
- Peter Cushing as Winston Smith (archive footage)
- Johnny Depp as Himself
- Matt Dillon as Himself
- Tymon Dogg as Himself (archive footage)
- Joe Ely as Himself
- Antony Genn as Himself
- Bobby Gillespie as Himself
- Alasdair Gillies as Himself
- Iain Gillies as Himself
- Bob Gruen as Himself
- Topper Headon as Himself
- Damien Hirst as Himself
- Mick Jagger as Himself (archive footage)
- Jim Jarmusch as Himself
- Mick Jones as Himself
- Steve Jones as Himself
- Anthony Kiedis as Himself
- Don Letts as Himself
- Keith Levene as Himself
- Courtney Love as Herself
- Bernie Rhodes as Himself
- David Lee Roth as Himself (archive footage)
- Martin Scorsese as Himself
- Melle Mel as Himself
- Roland Gift as Himself
- Joe Strummer as Himself

== Reception ==
=== Critical response ===
The film was well received by critics. As of 18 October 2009 on the review aggregator Rotten Tomatoes, 89% of critics gave the film positive reviews, based on 61 reviews. On Metacritic, the film had an average score of 79 out of 100, based on 19 reviews.

Marc Savlov of The Austin Chronicle named it the 8th best film of 2007. Stephanie Zacharek of Salon named it the 9th best film of 2007.

=== Box office ===
As of 31 January 2008 box office takings totalled $1,108,740.

== Accolades ==
- Nominated Grand Jury Prize in the World Cinema – as Documentary category at the 2007 Sundance Film Festival
- Winner of Best British Documentary at the 2007 British Independent Film Awards
- Nominated Best Single Documentary at the 2008 Irish Film and Television Awards

== Soundtrack ==
The official soundtrack was produced by Ian Neil, Julien Temple, and Alan Moloney. It is a mix of spoken word clips from interviews with Strummer and others, tracks from his various bands (including several rare or unreleased tracks by the Clash), and eclectic selections from other musicians that Strummer played on his BBC World radio show London Calling from 1999–2002 (some of which include his spoken introduction).

No.	Title	Writer(s)	Artist(s)	Length
1.	"Punk Rock Warlord" (spoken word)	Joe Strummer	Joe Strummer, Interview from WOMAD Festival, MTV networks, 1995	0:11
2.	"White Riot" (alternate demo mix)	Joe Strummer, Mick Jones	The Clash	2:22
3.	"Rock The Casbah"	Joe Strummer, Mick Jones, Topper Headon	Rachid Taha	4:30
4.	"BBC World Service" (spoken word)	Joe Strummer	Joe Strummer	0:19
5.	"Crawfish" (from the film King Creole)	Fred Wise, Ben Weisman	Elvis Presley	2:08
6.	"Black Sheep Boy"	Tim Hardin	Tim Hardin	2:00
7.	"Kick Out the Jams"	Michael Davis, Fred "Sonic" Smith, Wayne Kramer, Dennis Thompson	MC5	3:00
8.	"Keys To Your Heart"	Joe Strummer	The 101ers	3:38
9.	"Mick and Paul were different" (spoken word)	Joe Strummer	Joe Strummer, interview with MTV News, 2002	0:11
10.	"I'm So Bored with the USA" (demo version)	Joe Strummer, Mick Jones	The Clash	2:20
11.	"Natty Rebel"	Ewart Beckford, U-Roy / Bob Marley (sample, Soul Rebel)	U-Roy	4:09
12.	"Armagideon Time"	Jackie Mittoo, Willi Williams	The Clash	3:46
13.	"Nervous Breakdown"	Mario Roccuzzo	Eddie Cochran	2:18
14.	"(In The) Pouring Rain" (previously unreleased)	Joe Strummer	The Clash	5:06
15.	"Omotepe" (from the film Walker)	Joe Strummer	Joe Strummer	3:44
16.	"Martha Cecilia"	Cifuentes	Andres Landeros	2:52
17.	"Minuet" ([sic] liner notes list the song as "Minuet", the actual title is "Minuit")	Ernest Ranglin	Ernest Ranglin, Baaba Maal	8:57
18.	"Trash City" (from the film Permanent Record)	Joe Strummer	The Latino Rockabilly War	4:11
19.	"I called him Woody" (spoken word)	Topper Headon	Topper Headon, interview from the film	0:19
20.	"Ranger's Command"	Woody Guthrie	Woody Guthrie	2:48
21.	"Corrina, Corrina"	Bob Dylan	Bob Dylan	2:44
22.	"Johnny Appleseed"	Joe Strummer, Martin Slattery, Tymon Dogg, Scott Shields, Pablo Cook	Joe Strummer and the Mescaleros	4:02
23.	"To Love Somebody"	Barry Gibb, Robin Gibb	Nina Simone	2:38
24.	"Without people, you're nothing." (spoken word)	Joe Strummer	Joe Strummer, interview with MTV news, 2002	0:51
25.	"Willesden To Cricklewood"	Joe Strummer, Antony Genn	Joe Strummer and the Mescaleros	6:46
