= Let's Rock Again! =

Let's Rock Again
- Directed by: Dick Rude
- Produced by: Dick Rude Productions; Joe Strummer; Lucinda Strummer
- Starring: Joe Strummer; Martin Slattery; Scott Shields; Tymon Dogg; Simon Stafford; Luke Bullen
- Edited by: Dick Rude; Arnaud Gerardy
- Music by: Warren Huart
- Distributed by: Image Entertainment
- Release date: 2004
- Running time: 68 minutes
- Language: English

Let's Rock Again! is a music documentary film following Joe Strummer as he tours across the United States and Japan with his band the Mescaleros promoting their second album Global a Go-Go. The memoir was shot by filmmaker and longtime Strummer friend Dick Rude in the 18 months leading up to Strummer's death in 2002.

In light of Strummer's death, the film is "inevitably sad to watch now," as The Guardian wrote in a review, but still inspirational in its portrayal of "a star of rare humility".

== DVD ==
The DVD was released in June 2006. Bonus features include:

- Interviews with Joe Strummer
- Behind-the-scenes footage
- Joe's Suitcase [Slide Show]
- Q & A with director Dick Rude
- Five songs performed live:
1. "Bigger They Come, Harder They Fall"
2. "Quarter Pound an Ishens"
3. "Armagideon Time"
4. "Pressure Drop '72"
5. "Rudie Can't Fail"

Scene selections include:

1. Tom Snyder and The Clash
2. 1977 (The Clash)
3. 1 October 2002, Tokyo, Japan
4. Main Title; Global a Go-Go
5. Bhindi Bhagee
6. Interaction with the Fans
7. Quarter Pound an Ishens
8. Trashman or Doorman?
9. From Hero to Zero
10. London's Burning
11. Word of Mouth
12. Mega Bottle Ride
13. Drumming Up Business
14. Get Down Moses
15. Backstage Shenanigans
16. Shaktar Donetsk
17. Songwriting and Lyrics
18. Cool 'n' Out
19. 9 October 2001, New York, NY
20. Minstrel Boy
21. Going Underground
22. 1969
23. Johnny Appleseed
24. End Credits

== See also ==
- Joe Strummer and the Mescaleros
- Joe Strummer
