= Rock Art and the X-Ray Style =

Studio album by Joe Strummer and the Mescaleros
- Released: 18 October 1999
- Recorded: 1999
- Studios: Battery (Willesden, London)
- Genre: Alternative rock
- Length: 49:44
- Label: HellCat
- Producers: Antony Genn; Richard Norris

Joe Strummer and the Mescaleros chronology
Rock Art and the X-Ray Style (1999)	Global a Go-Go (2001)

Singles from Rock Art & The X-Ray Style
- 1. "Yalla Yalla"; 2. "Tony Adams"

Professional ratings
Review scores
Source	Rating
AllMusic	3/5 stars
Christgau's Consumer Guide	(neither)
NME	5/10
Spin	5/10

Rock Art and the X-Ray Style is the debut studio album by Joe Strummer and the Mescaleros, released on 18 October 1999 by Hellcat Records. This album featured the band in its first incarnation: Joe Strummer and Antony Genn on guitar and vocals, Martin Slattery playing keyboards and guitar, Steve "Smiley" Barnard on drums, Pablo Cook on other percussion instruments, and Scott Shields on bass guitar. Richard Flack also did engineering on the album.

The record marked Strummer's re-emergence from a long absence in the music scene, his last record being 1989's Earthquake Weather, a decade earlier. The album begins with "Tony Adams," a track which sounds not unlike Strummer's previous work with The Clash. Saxophone riffs are juxtaposed with reggae inspired guitar, as Strummer recites lyrics detailing a catastrophe hitting New York City. The rest of the record takes a winding journey, with songs that capture Strummer's genre mixing. "Sandpaper Blues" features hand drums and African chanting, "Techno D-Day" dabbles in electronic instruments, while "Road to Rock and Roll," another song written by Strummer for Johnny Cash combines acoustic guitar with turntables and electronic drums. "Yalla Yalla" Strummer himself once described as "an ancient British folk song....written in the year 1999." The song is rich in layers, which includes keyboards, synths, bass, drums, and a guitar with endless sustain (likely provided via an e-bow). The song "Tony Adams" was named after the football player of the same name.

"Yalla Yalla" and "Tony Adams" were both released as singles with music videos shot for each. The video for "Tony Adams" features Strummer walking down the street of New York City carrying a ghetto blaster. Rancid's Lars Fredriksen makes a brief appearance in the video.

To promote the album, Strummer embarked on his first tour in ten years which included his first North American tour since 1989.

A remastered version of the album along with Strummer's other two Hellcat released albums was released as a special 57 song digital download titled Joe Strummer & the Mescaleros: The Hellcat Years on 21 August 2012 to celebrate what would have been Strummer's 60th birthday. Hellcat also released each remastered album individually on CD and vinyl on 25 September 2012.

== Track listing ==
All lyrics are written by Joe Strummer.

No.	Title	Music	Length
1.	"Tony Adams"	Joe Strummer, Antony Genn	6:35
2.	"Sandpaper Blues"	Strummer, Gary Dyson, Richard Norris	4:28
3.	"X-Ray Style"	Strummer	4:36
4.	"Techno D-Day"	Strummer, Genn	4:09
5.	"The Road to Rock 'n' Roll"	Strummer, Genn	4:00
6.	"Nitcomb"	Strummer, Genn	4:32
7.	"Diggin' the New"	Strummer, Norris	3:09
8.	"Forbidden City"	Strummer	4:48
9.	"Yalla Yalla"	Strummer, Pablo Cook, Norris	6:58
10.	"Willesden to Cricklewood"	Strummer, Genn	6:46
Total length:			49:44

== Personnel ==
- Joe Strummer - vocals (all tracks), guitar (1–2,4–5,7–8), acoustic guitar (3)
- Antony Genn - guitar (1,3–4,6–8,10), bass (1,3,6), backing vocals (1,4,6–8,10), fresh drum re-wire (1), orphan choir (3), acoustic guitar (5), piano (6,10), extra re-wire beats (8), synthesizer (10), strings (10), programming (10)
- Richard Norris - keyboards (2,7,9), drum programming (2,9), E-bow guitar (9)
- Martin Slattery - saxophone (1), Spanish guitar (3), Wurlitzer (6), Hammond organ (8), melodica (9)
- Scott Shields - bass (4–8), backing vocals (7,9), acoustic guitar (8), guitar (8)
- Pablo Cook - percussion (all tracks but 10), urdhu (3), backing vocals (4), drums (6)
- Steve "Smiley" Barnard - drums (8)
- Dave Stewart - acoustic guitar (2)
- Ged Lynch - drums (4,7)
- Gary Dyson - backing vocals (2), African chant (2)
- B. J. Cole - pedal steel guitar (1,5)
- D.J. Pete B. - scratches (5)

Technical

- Joe Strummer - mixing
- Antony Genn - mixing, producer
- Richard Norris - producer
- Richard Flack - engineer, mixing
- Ian Tregoning - engineer
- Damien Hirst - cover art
- Streaky Gee - mastering
