= Joe Strummer & the Mescaleros: The Hellcat Years =

Compilation album by Joe Strummer & the Mescaleros
- Released: August 21, 2012
- Genres: Alternative rock. punk rock, reggae, folk
- Label: HellCat
- Producers: Antony Genn, Richard Norris, Scott Shields, Martin Slattery, Joe Strummer, Rick Rubin, Danny Saber, Richard Flack

Joe Strummer & the Mescaleros chronology
Streetcore (2003)	Joe Strummer & the Mescaleros: The Hellcat Years (2012)	Live at Acton Town Hall (2012)

Joe Strummer & the Mescaleros: The Hellcat Years is a MP3 digital download album consisting of the entire remastered catalog of music that was recorded by Joe Strummer & the Mescaleros during their tenure with Hellcat Records from 1999 to 2003.

The 57 song set was released to celebrate what would have been Strummer's 60th birthday. The set features all three of the group's studio albums along with various B-sides and the entire November 2002 concert titled Live at Acton Town Hall which features one of Strummer's final performances before his death a month later.

== Track listing ==
=== Rock Art & The X-Ray Style ===
1. "Tony Adams"
2. "Sandpaper Blues"
3. "X-Ray Style"
4. "Techno D-Day"
5. "The Road to Rock 'n' Roll"
6. "Nitcomb"
7. "Diggin' the New"
8. "Forbidden City"
9. "Yalla Yalla"
10. "Willesden to Cricklewood"

=== Global a Go-Go ===
1. "Johnny Appleseed"
2. "Cool 'n' Out"
3. "Global a Go-Go"
4. "Bhindi Bhagee"
5. "Gamma Ray"
6. "Mega Bottle Ride"
7. "Shaktar Donetsk"
8. "Mondo Bongo"
9. "Bummed Out City"
10. "At the Border, Guy"
11. "Minstrel Boy"

=== Streetcore ===
1. "Coma Girl"
2. "Get Down Moses"
3. "Long Shadow"
4. "Arms Aloft"
5. "Ramshackle Day Parade"
6. "Redemption Song"
7. "All in a Day"
8. "Burnin' Streets"
9. "Midnight Jam"
10. "Silver and Gold"

=== B-sides and outtakes ===
1. "Time and the Tide" (b-side to "Yalla Yalla")
2. "X-Ray Style" (Live Summer '99) (b-side to "Yalla Yalla")
3. "Yalla Yalla" (Norro's King Dub) (b-side to "Yalla Yalla")
4. "The Harder They Come" (live) (b-side to "Coma Girl")
5. "Rudy, A Message to You" (live) (b-side to "Coma Girl")
6. "Blitzkrieg Bop" (live) (b-side to "Coma Girl")
7. "Yalla Yalla" (live) (b-side to "Coma Girl")
8. "Armagideon Time" (live) (b-side to "Redemption Song")
9. "Pressure Drop" (live) (b-side to "Redemption Song")
10. "Junco Partner" (live) (from Give 'Em the Boot IV)

=== Live at Acton Town Hall ===
1. "Shaktar Donetsk"
2. "Bhindee Bhagee"
3. "Rudie Can't Fail"
4. "Tony Adams"
5. "(White Man) in Hammersmith Palais"
6. "Mega Bottle Ride"
7. "Get Down Moses"
8. "Police and Thieves"
9. "Cool 'N' Out"
10. "Police on My Back"
11. "Johnny Appleseed"
12. "Coma Girl"
13. "I Fought the Law"
14. "Bankrobber" (featuring Mick Jones)
15. "White Riot" (featuring Mick Jones)
16. "London's Burning" (featuring Mick Jones)
