= Global a Go-Go =

Studio album by Joe Strummer and the Mescaleros
- Released: 16 July 2001
- Studios: Battery Studios, Willesden, London
- Genres: Alternative rock; folk rock; reggae rock
- Length: 73:19
- Label: HellCat
- Producers: Scott Shields; Martin Slattery; Joe Strummer; Richard Flack

Joe Strummer and the Mescaleros chronology
Rock Art and the X-Ray Style (1999)	Global a Go-Go (2001)	Streetcore (2003)

Singles from Global a Go-Go
- 1. "Johnny Appleseed" Released: 9 July 2001

Professional ratings
Review scores
Source	Rating
Allmusic	3/5 stars
Christgau's Consumer Guide	(1-star Honorable Mention)
Kerrang!	3/5 stars
Rolling Stone	3.5/5 stars

Global a Go-Go is the second album by Joe Strummer and the Mescaleros, released on 16 July 2001. As the title suggests, there are world music influences on the album, mostly on the title track and "Bhindi Bhagee", a celebration of the "humble" but diverse and exciting ethnic and multi-cultural areas of London and other major cities. The album is heavy on acoustic instruments, especially in the instrumental "Minstrel Boy", a nearly 18-minute-long arrangement of a traditional Irish song. Other topics covered include Strummer's radio show, which was broadcast on the BBC World Service (Global a Go-Go) and left-wing political issues Strummer was well known for expounding as a member of the Clash. The album was well received by critics and fans, making much more of an impact than the group's previous effort Rock Art and the X-Ray Style. The title track, "Global A Go-Go", features backing vocals from longtime friend of Strummer, Roger Daltrey. Pete Townshend is also rumoured to be buried in the mix of "Minstrel Boy", but this has never been positively confirmed. The cover-art for the album was designed by Josh Shoes and Strummer.

The lead track and album's only single, "Johnny Appleseed" was the opening theme to the show John from Cincinnati. A music video for the song was also filmed. A different version of "Minstrel Boy" was used as the closing track on the film Black Hawk Down. This film version, which can also be found on the soundtrack, is significantly shorter and does feature the actual lyrics to the song. The "Minstrel Boy" track is also known as the "Worldcom Dirge" after being featured in a commercial by the soon-to be-bankrupt telecommunications company. Likewise, "Mondo Bongo" is featured in the film Mr. & Mrs. Smith. In Orphan Black, lines from "Bummed Out City" are recited at Sarah Manning's funeral as her eulogy.

A remastered version of the album along with Strummer's other two Hellcat released albums was released as a special 57 song digital download titled Joe Strummer & The Mescaleros: The Hellcat Years on 21 August 2012 to celebrate what would have been Strummer's 60th birthday. Hellcat will also release each remastered album individually on CD and vinyl on 25 September 2012.

== Track listing ==
All lyrics are written by Joe Strummer, except for "Minstrel Boy"; all music is composed by Joe Strummer, Martin Slattery, Pablo Cook, Scott Shields and Tymon Dogg, except where noted.

No.	Title	Writer(s)	Length
1.	"Johnny Appleseed"		4:03
2.	"Cool 'n' Out"	Joe Strummer, Martin Slattery, Scott Shields, Richard Flack, Antony Genn	4:22
3.	"Global a Go-Go"		5:55
4.	"Bhindi Bhagee"		5:47
5.	"Gamma Ray"		6:58
6.	"Mega Bottle Ride"		3:33
7.	"Shaktar Donetsk"		5:57
8.	"Mondo Bongo"		6:14
9.	"Bummed Out City"		5:33
10.	"At the Border, Guy"		7:08
11.	"Minstrel Boy"	Thomas Moore, credited as Traditional; arranged by The Mescaleros	17:49
Total length:			73:19

== Personnel ==
- Joe Strummer – Vocals (1–10), Off Stage Voice (11)
- Martin Slattery – Hammond Organ (1, 5, 6, 10), Wurlitzer (1, 3–5, 7, 9), Flute (1, 4, 8), Drones (1), Backing Vocals (1, 3, 6–8), Synthesizer (2, 3, 7, 9), Saxophone (2), Electric Guitar (3), Acoustic Guitar (3, 4, 6, 11), Piano (3, 6, 10), Russian Choir (3), African Guitar (4), Bedroom Fuzzbox Solo (4), Station Bass (4), Filtered Synthesizer (6), Melodica (6, 10), Hammer Dulcimer (7), French Horn (7), Accordion (8), Warping & Filtration (9), Cardboard Box (9), Twin Speed Electric Guitar (10), Organ (11), Hi-Life Guitar (11)
- Scott Shields – Acoustic Guitar (1, 3–6, 9), Bass (1–8, 10), Backing Vocals (1, 3, 4, 6, 8–10), Guitar (2), Drums (2–4, 6, 7), Vocals (2, 7), Electric Riff (3), Russian Choir (3), Electric Guitar (4, 5), Filtered Guitar (4), Raga Riffs (5), Slide Guitar (6), Hammond Organ (6), Eastern Guitar (7), Homemade Loops (7), 2-String Bass (9), Bongos (9), Witchdoctor Bells (9), Rhythm Guitar (10), Electric Guitar Picking (10), Triple Tracked Drumkit (10), Timbales Break (10), Low Humming Choir (10)
- Pablo Cook – Drums (1), Percussion (1, 7, 9, 11), Weirdo Bank Noises (3), Ayahuesca (3), Rhythm Track (4), Bodhran (4), Wavedrum (4, 6), Congas (5, 6, 11), Bongos (5, 11), Guiro (5), A-Go-Go Bells (5), Shaker (5, 6), Tambourine (6, 10), Udu (6), Multiple Personality Vox (7), Cuban Drum Section (8), Glass Harmonica (8), Whistle (10), Screaming (10), Vibing (10), Gope Rhythm (11)
- Tymon Dogg – Violin (1, 3–5, 7–9, 11), Mandolin (1), Spanish Guitar (3, 8), Electric Guitar (4), Sheep Charmer (5), Acoustic Guitar (11)
- Richard Flack – Crash Cymbals (1), Alter Riff Filter (2), Backing Vocals (2, 7), Sherman Filter (4), Live Echo Plating (10), Sound Destruction (10), Muffled Snare Loops (11)
- Roger Daltrey – Vocals (3)
- Antony Genn – Loops (2), Strings (2)
- Wags Wagstaff – Unusual Plinky Guitar (2)

Technical

- Chris Lasalle – sequencing
- Bob Gruen – photography
- Josh Cheuse – cover-art

== In popular culture ==
The song "Johnny Appleseed" was used as the theme to the short-lived HBO series John from Cincinnati.

The song "Mondo Bongo" is used in the movie Mr & Mrs Smith (scene in Bogota).

== See also ==
- Let's Rock Again! - a documentary shot during the Global a Go-Go tour
