= Live at Acton Town Hall =

Live album by Joe Strummer & The Mescaleros
- Released: 23 November 2012
- Recorded: 15 November 2002
- Genres: Alternative rock, Punk rock, Folk rock, Reggae rock
- Label: HellCat/Epitaph Records

Joe Strummer & The Mescaleros chronology
Joe Strummer & The Mescaleros: The Hellcat Years (2012)	Live at Acton Town Hall (2012)	Joe Strummer 001 (2018)

Live at Acton Town Hall is a live recording of Joe Strummer & The Mescaleros in performance at Acton Town Hall in London in 2002. It was first released in 2012 as a Record Store Day exclusive – a vinyl double LP in a limited number of 2,200 copies. The show was recorded directly off the mixing desk by fans who, with foreknowledge of Mick Jones' plans to attend, anticipated some kind of onstage reunion of the former Clash songwriting partners. The recording circulated for many years just amongst a small group of fans who knew of its existence before surfacing a decade later at Hellcat Records.

The concert, a benefit for striking firefighters, was recorded on 15 November 2002 and features one of the final live performances by Strummer (the last live show being in Liverpool on 22 November 2002), who died due to a heart condition on 22 December 2002. The performance features songs Strummer recorded with The Clash along with songs from Strummer's albums for Hellcat Records including new written songs such as "Coma Girl" and "Get Down Moses" that eventually would appear on Strummer's posthumous album, Streetcore. The highlight of the performance features a reunion with Strummer's former bandmate from The Clash, Mick Jones for the first time in almost twenty years.

The live album was also made available as part of a 57-song digital download-only collection titled Joe Strummer & The Mescaleros: The Hellcat Years.

== Track listing ==
1. "Shaktar Donetsk"
2. "Bhindee Bhagee"
3. "Rudie Can't Fail"
4. "Tony Adams"
5. "(White Man) In Hammersmith Palais"
6. "Mega Bottle Ride"
7. "Get Down Moses"
8. "Police and Thieves"
9. "Cool 'N' Out"
10. "Police on My Back"
11. "Johnny Appleseed"
12. "Coma Girl"
13. "I Fought the Law"
14. "Bankrobber" (featuring Mick Jones)
15. "White Riot" (featuring Mick Jones)
16. "London's Burning" (featuring Mick Jones)
