= Meeting Joe Strummer =

- Original language: English
- Written by: Paul Hodson
- Characters: Nick; Steve
- Genre: Comedy; Drama
- Setting: Various

Premiere
- Date: 2006
- Place: Edinburgh Festival, Edinburgh

Meeting Joe Strummer is a two-handed play by Paul Hodson.

== Introduction ==
The play was an Edinburgh Festival Fringe First winner in 2006. The play originally starred actors Steve North and Nick Miles and was produced by Brighton Theatre Events at The Gilded Balloon. It subsequently toured the UK in autumn 2007 with Steve North and Huw Higginson taking the role of Nick, and in March and April 2010 with Steve North playing Steve and Jason Pitt playing Nick, produced by The Future is Unwritten Theatre Company and directed by Paul Hodson.

== Story ==
Nick and Steve, two men in their forties, meet again for the first time in years at a gig by Joe Strummer and the Mescaleros. As teenagers, they watched The Clash play the Rock Against Racism rally at Victoria Park in 1978, and lived through divorce, class warfare, acid house, the Thatcher years and soap stardom; however, they retain their passions for punk idealism, or "inner Strummer". With a cast of only two, the play is performed with no props on a bare stage in front of a large banner of Strummer. There are rapid jump cuts in time and place between scenes.
