= Acton Town Hall =

Municipal building in London, England

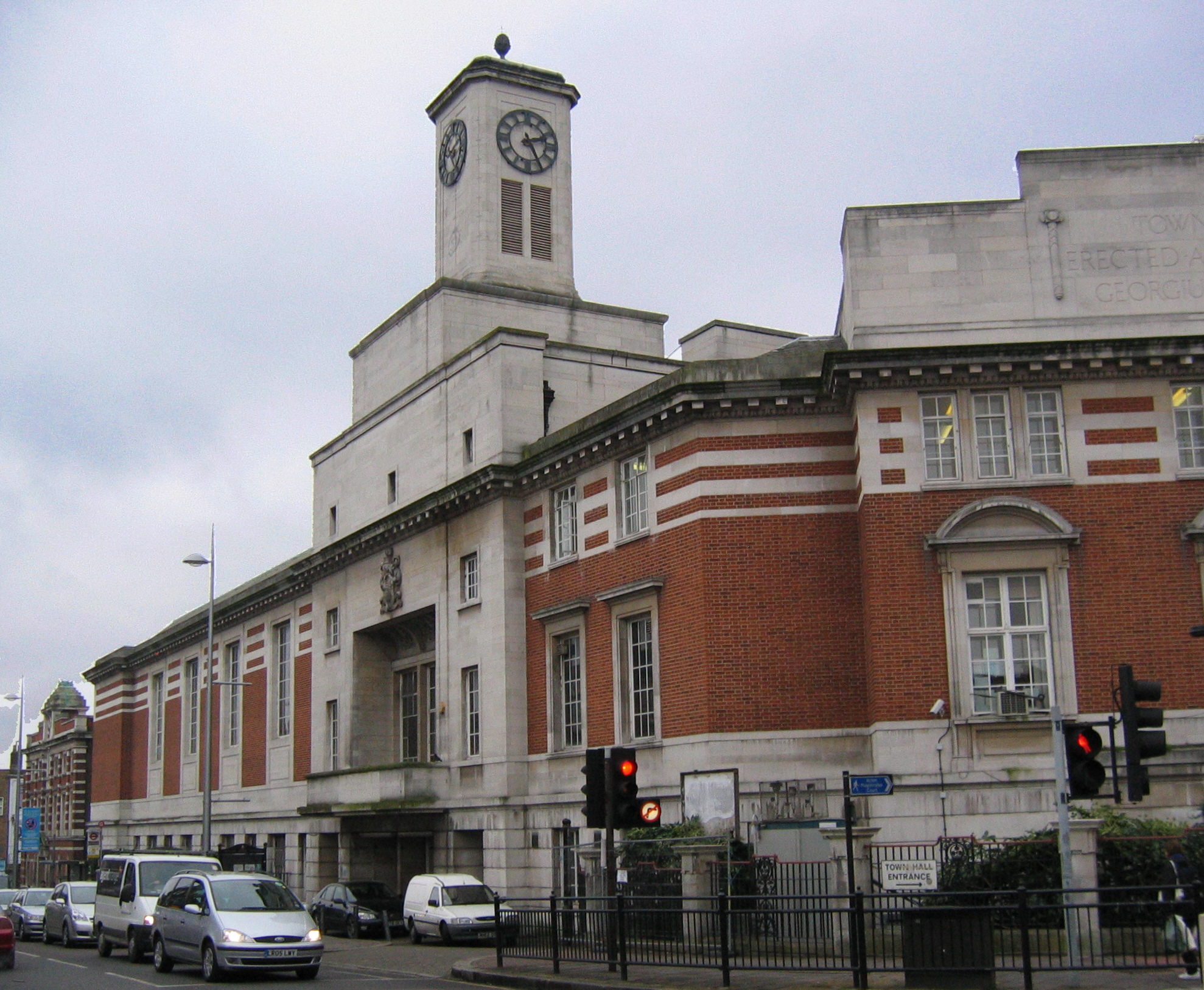
- Acton Town Hall

- Shown in Ealing
- 51.5063°N 0.2677°W
- Location: Acton, London, England

History
- Built: 1910

Site notes
- Architect(s): Raffles and Gridley
- Architectural style: Baroque style

Listed Building – Grade II
- Designated: 20 November 2003
- Reference no.: 1390770

Acton Town Hall is a municipal building in High Street, Acton, London, England. It is a Grade II listed building.

== History ==
The facility was commissioned to replace an existing 19th century town hall in the High Street, which had been designed by Edward Monson in the Italianate style for the local board of health. The site chosen for the new building was to the north of an early 19th century gothic style building known as Berrymead Priory.

The foundation stone for the new building on 3 April 1909. It was designed by Raffles and Gridley in the Baroque style and was built by F.G. Minter of Putney on Acton Lane. It was officially opened by Herbert Nield, the Member of Parliament for Ealing on 10 March 1910. The design involved seven bays with a central arched doorway flanked by Doric order columns on the ground floor; there were sash windows on the first floor and smaller windows on the second floor.

The building was established as the offices of the Acton Urban District Council and went on to become headquarters of the Municipal Borough of Acton when it was granted county borough status in 1921. A separate structure, now known as the "King's Rooms Building", was designed by William Leicester and built further to the east along the High Street: it opened in 1926. The King's Rooms Building was intended to provide access and facilities for the swimming baths.

The main building was extended to the east along the High Street (towards the King's Rooms Building) to the designs of William Leicester in the late 1930s. The enlarged building, which included a large assembly hall with stage and balcony on the High Street frontage, was officially re-opened by Lord Rochdale, the Lord Lieutenant of Middlesex, on 24 June 1939. The design for the extension involved a three-bay central section with the main entrance on the ground floor, a balcony and picture window on the first floor, the coat of arms of the borough on the second floor and a clock tower above. A master clock controlled the tower clock and every other clock in the building.

A Victory Ball to mark the end of the Second World War was held in the concert hall in 1945. The assembly hall continued to serve as an events and concert venue and performers included the band, The Who, in September 1962. The town hall ceased to function as the local of seat of government when the enlarged London Borough of Ealing was formed in 1965. The building subsequently accommodated, amongst other things, a local council information bureau and the local registrar's office.

The assembly hall was the scene of a live recording by Joe Strummer & The Mescaleros, subsequently released as Live at Acton Town Hall, in November 2002. The concert, a fundraiser for the FBU, was one of Joe Strummer's final gigs before his death later that year, as well as the last time he performed with former bandmate Mick Jones, who joined him for the encore.

After becoming surplus to requirements, the complex was converted for residential use in 2018. As part of the conversion, the council chamber was transformed into a large open living space.
