= Redemption Song: The Ballad of Joe Strummer =

2007 biography by Chris Salewicz

- Author: Chris Salewicz
- Genre: Biography
- Publisher: Faber and Faber
- Publication date: May 2007
- Pages: 629
- ISBN: 057121178X
- OCLC: 76794852

Redemption Song: The Ballad of Joe Strummer, originally published in different form in the United Kingdom in 2006 by HarperCollins as Redemption Song: The Authorised Biography of Joe Strummer, is a biographic book by Chris Salewicz released in May 2007. The book documents the life and death of Joe Strummer, the front man of The Clash. Apart from going through the history of the band, the book also goes into deep descriptions of Strummer's relationships with his friends and family; including how his brother's suicide influenced him.
