= Streetcore =

Studio album by Joe Strummer & the Mescaleros
- Released: 21 October 2003
- Studios: 2KHz (London); Rockfield (Wales)
- Genres: Alternative rock, reggae rock
- Length: 41:39
- Label: Hellcat
- Producers: Scott Shields, Martin Slattery, Rick Rubin, Danny Saber

Joe Strummer & the Mescaleros chronology
Global a Go-Go (2001)	Streetcore (2003)	Joe Strummer & The Mescaleros: The Hellcat Years (2012)

Singles from Streetcore
- 1. "Coma Girl"; 2. "Redemption Song"

Streetcore is the third and final studio album by Joe Strummer & the Mescaleros. The album was completed after the death of frontman Joe Strummer, primarily by Martin Slattery and Scott Shields, and released on 21 October 2003. The album marks the band's transition from their previous genre-bending work to a more straightforward rock album, reminiscent of Strummer's early work with the Clash. The album received a positive critical reception and is generally seen as a return to form and a high point for Strummer to have gone out on.

A remastered version of the album along with Strummer's other two Hellcat released albums was released as a special 57 song digital download titled Joe Strummer & the Mescaleros: The Hellcat Years on 21 August 2012 to celebrate what would have been Strummer's 60th birthday. Hellcat also released each remastered album individually on CD and vinyl on 25 September 2012.

== Song information ==
Due to Strummer's death, many of the vocal performances are first takes. "Midnight Jam" is completely without lyrics – instead, samplings of Joe's BBC Radio show Joe Strummer's London Calling are intermixed with the music. Other tracks, such as a cover of Bob Marley's "Redemption Song" and "Long Shadow", were recorded with famed producer Rick Rubin, and it is unclear whether or not these tracks were originally intended to be on this album. Another notable track is "Long Shadow", which was originally written by Strummer for Johnny Cash. Rubin would however get Strummer and Cash, who died a year after Strummer, together in the studio as the two recorded a version of "Redemption Song" that was featured on Cash's posthumously released Unearthed box set.

Music videos were released for the album's two singles, "Coma Girl" and "Redemption Song". The video for "Redemption Song", which was directed by Josh Cheuse, who designed the cover art for Strummer's 1989 album Earthquake Weather and who also appears in the video, is a tribute to Strummer's life and legacy. Filmed in November 2003 in Manhattan in the East Village, the video opens with a clip of Strummer talking from The Clash documentary Westway to the World, with the focus of the video being a mural of Strummer that was painted by graffiti artists Zephyr and Dr. Revolt outside Niagra, a bar owned by musician Jesse Malin. The video also features many New Yorkers, along with some of Strummer's closest famous friends including Malin, Matt Dillon, Steve Buscemi, Jim Jarmusch, Tim Armstrong, Lars Fredriksen, Matt Freeman, Cara Seymour, Sara Driver and Cinqué Lee as they watch the mural being painted. Stock footage and photos of Strummer from his tenure with The Clash and Mescaleros is also featured.

== Reception ==
=== Critical ===
Professional ratings
Aggregate scores
Source	Rating
Metacritic	85/100
Review scores
Source	Rating
AllMusic	4.5/5 stars
Alternative Press	5/5
Entertainment Weekly	B+
The Guardian	5/5 stars
Mojo	4/5 stars
Pitchfork	6.9/10
Q	4/5 stars
Rolling Stone	3/5 stars
Spin	B
Uncut	5/5 stars

The album received a positive critical reception and is generally seen as a return to form for Joe Strummer that sees him going out on a high point. AllMusic wrote "Like Muddy Waters, whose final albums were among the best in his catalog, Streetcore... sends Strummer into rock & roll heaven a roaring, laughing, snarling lion", calling the album "truly the finest, most cohesive work he did after London Calling." Mojo wrote "Streetcore is an amalgam of all that made Joe Strummer, the musician and the man, so great."

=== Impact ===
Strummer's cover of "Redemption Song" was featured as outro music for the Red Hot Chili Peppers during their historic show at Slane Castle and can be heard on their 2003 live DVD, Live at Slane Castle.

The song "Coma Girl" was performed as the opening track at Bruce Springsteen and the E Street Band's performance at the Glastonbury Festival on 27 June 2009. "Coma Girl" was also covered by The Loved Ones on their EP Distractions.

"Arms Aloft" has been covered by American rock band Pearl Jam and a live recording is featured on their 2011 live album, Live on Ten Legs.

"Ramshackle Day Parade", the fifth song of the album, was featured on the acclaimed movie The Diving Bell and the Butterfly.

== Track listing ==
All lyrics are written by Joe Strummer, except where noted.

No.	Title	Lyrics	Music	Length
1.	"Coma Girl"		Scott Shields, Martin Slattery, Strummer	3:48
2.	"Get Down Moses"		Luke Bullen, Shields, Slattery, Simon Stafford, Strummer	5:05
3.	"Long Shadow"		Smokey Hormel, Strummer	3:34
4.	"Arms Aloft"		Bullen, Shields, Slattery, Stafford, Strummer	3:47
5.	"Ramshackle Day Parade"		Bullen, Shields, Slattery, Stafford, Strummer	4:02
6.	"Redemption Song"	Bob Marley	Bob Marley	3:28
7.	"All in a Day"		Danny Saber, Strummer	4:55
8.	"Burnin' Streets"		Shields, Slattery, Strummer	4:32
9.	"Midnight Jam"		Bullen, Shields, Slattery, Stafford, Strummer	5:50
10.	"Silver and Gold" (cover of Bobby Charles' "Before I Grow Too Old")	Dave Bartholomew, Antoine Domino, Bobby Charles (Robert Guidry)	Dave Bartholomew, Antoine Domino, Bobby Charles	2:38

== Personnel ==
The Mescaleros

- Joe Strummer – Vocals (all tracks), Telecaster (1), Guitar (3,6), Vocal Samples (9)
- Martin Slattery – Organ (1,2), Guitar (1,4), Backing Vocals (1,5,8), Synthesizer (2,4,5), Tenor Saxophone (2), Electric Guitar (5,8), Drums (5), Percussion (5), Chamberlain Strings (8–9), Tambourine (8,9), Piano (9), Mellotron (9), Wurlitzer (10)
- Scott Shields – Guitar (1–2,4), Percussion (1–2,5), Backing Vocals (1–2,4–5,8), Drums (2,5,8–9), Small Kit (4), Electric Guitar (5), Acoustic Guitar (5,8,10), Bass (8–10), Slide Guitar (8,10), Synthesizer (8), Cowbell (9), Harmonica (10)
- Simon Stafford – Bass (2,4–5), Cornet (2), Trombone (5), Backing Vocals (5), Guitar (9), Cello (9)
- Luke Bullen – Drums (1–2,4–5), Loops (5), Congas (9)
- Tymon Dogg – Violin (10)

Guest musicians

- Josh Freese – Drums (7)
- Smokey Hormel – Guitar (3,6), Backing Vocals (3)
- Rick Rubin – Piano (6)
- Peter Stewart – Backing Vocals (1,8)
- Benmont Tench – Harmonium (6)
- Danny Saber – Musician (7)

Production

- Joe Strummer – photography, artwork
- Martin Slattery – programming, production, engineering, mixing
- Scott Shields – programming, production, engineering, mixing
- Rick Rubin – production, mixing
- Danny Saber – production, mixing
- Cameron Craig – programming, mixing, engineering
- Tim Bran – programming
- Richard Flack – programming
- Roger Lian – digital editing
- Greg Fidelman – editing
- Howie Weinberg – mastering
- David Ferguson – engineering, mixing
- Niv Adiri – engineering
- Thom Russo – engineering
- Lindsay Chase – production co-ordination
- Lucinda Mellor – project co-ordination
- Paula Woolfe – project co-ordination
- Art Dog – artwork
- Josh Cheuse – photography
- Jill Furmanovsky – photography
- Colin Glen – photography
