= The Latino Rockabilly War =

American musical group

- Origin: Los Angeles
- Genres: Rockabilly, rock and roll
- Past members: Zander Schloss; Lonnie Marshall; Willie MacNeil; Jack Irons

The Latino Rockabilly War was a band most notable for backing the Clash frontman Joe Strummer. The band, which played a fusion of Latin and rock music, was formed by Strummer with meeting Joey Altruda and Willie McNeil of jazz-punk group Tupelo Chain Sex, along with musician Zander Schloss.

With Strummer, the Latino Rockabilly War created the album Earthquake Weather, released through Epic Records. The album was well received by critics, but did not sell well. Led by Strummer, the band also contributed five songs to the soundtrack for the movie Permanent Record, which featured a young Keanu Reeves: "Trash City", "Baby the Trans", "Nothin' 'bout Nothin", "Nefertiti Rock", and the instrumental "Theme from Permanent Record".

In a segment of the documentary film Joe Strummer: The Future Is Unwritten, Anthony Kiedis mentions that during the period in which the band's material was recorded, drummer Jack Irons (formerly of Red Hot Chili Peppers and Pearl Jam) was in residency at a mental institution. Therefore, Strummer had to arrange transportation and leave for Irons in order for him to participate in the band's output.

The band toured with Strummer on the Rock Against The Rich Tour in 1988 with friends in tow, including film director Alex Cox. Their sets included songs spanning Strummer's career to that point, including works from the 101ers and the Clash, material co-written with Mick Jones for Big Audio Dynamite's No. 10, Upping St. album, and a cover of the Pogues' song "If I Should Fall From Grace With God."

== Members ==
- Zander Schloss – lead and rhythm guitar
- Lonnie Marshall – bass guitar
- Joey Altruda – bass guitar (1988 on the Permanent Record-soundtrack)
- Jim Donica – bass guitar (1988 on the Rock Against The Rich Tour)
- Roberto Pla – percussion (1988 on the Rock Against The Rich Tour)
- Willie MacNeil – drums
- Jack Irons – drums
