= Stephen North =

English actor (born 1965)

- Born: 20 January 1965 (age 60); Dorking, Surrey, England
- Occupation: Actor
- Years active: 1989–present

Stephen North (born 20 January 1965) is an English actor. He had his first major role playing firefighter Colin Parrish in the ITV drama London's Burning between 1990 and 1993. He has since appeared in numerous shows on British television, including Doctor Who Christmas Special 2010, EastEnders, The Bill, The Day Britain Stopped, Murphy's Law, Holby City, Midsomer Murders, Doctors, Is Harry on the Boat?, EastEnders: E20 and Casualty. North also played one of the two lead roles in the award-winning stage play Meeting Joe Strummer along with Emmerdale actor Nick Miles. He was the solo performer in the original stage adaptation of Nick Hornby's Fever Pitch, which ran at the Arts Theatre London in 1995. He played the role of Ted Narracott in War Horse (play) at the New London Theatre from May 2013 to March 2014 and also in the National Theatre Live broadcast on 27 February 2014 and subsequent Encore screenings.

He co-wrote the film South West 9 and directed the award-winning short film Cregan for Screen South.

North is a supporter of Brighton and Hove Albion FC, and has co-written two books about the club, Build a Bonfire (Mainstream Publishing 1997). and "We Want Falmer" (Stripe Publishing 2011).
