= Joe Strummer =

British musician (1952–2002)

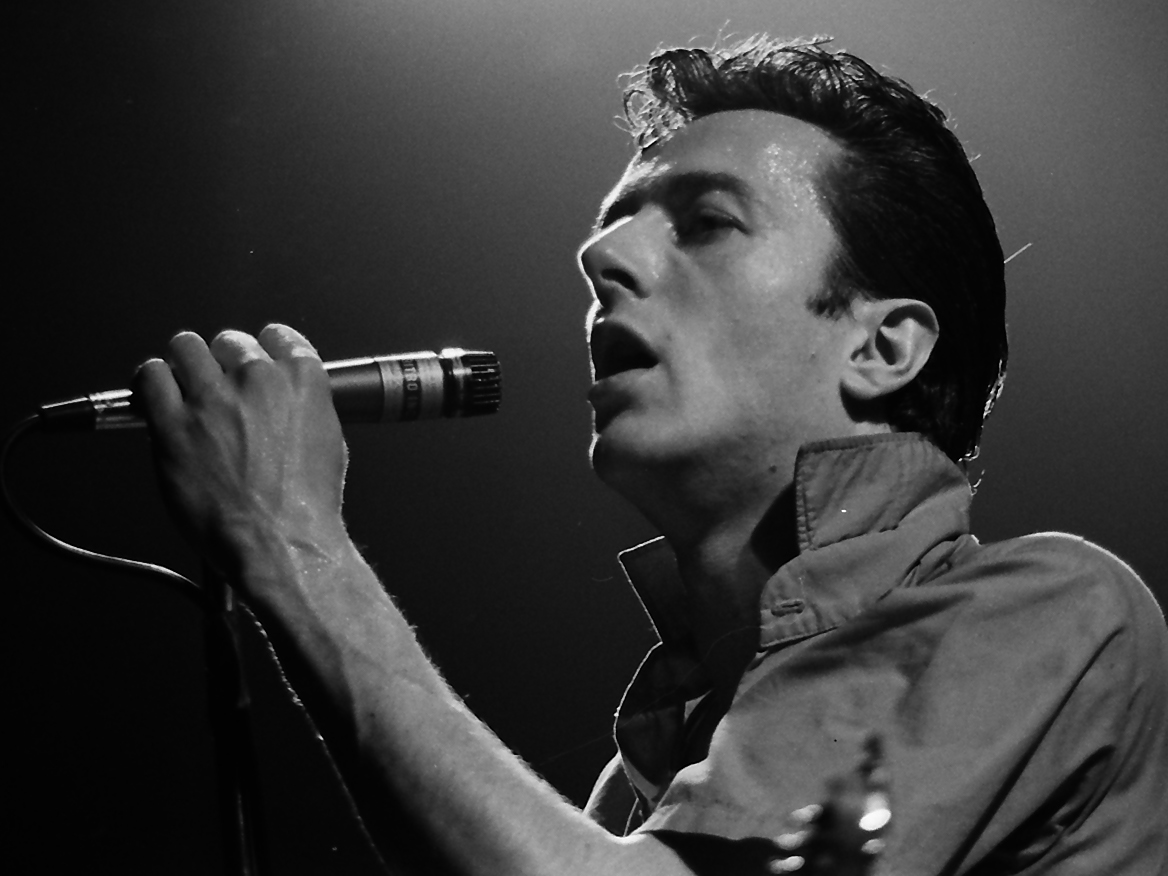
- Strummer performing live with the Clash at the Tower Theater in Upper Darby Township, Pennsylvania, 1980

Background information
- Born: John Graham Mellor; 21 August 1952; Ankara, Turkey
- Died: 22 December 2002 (aged 50) Broomfield, Somerset, England
- Genres: Punk rock; post-punk; reggae; rock and roll; new wave; alternative rock; folk punk
- Occupations: Singer; musician; songwriter
- Instruments: Vocals; guitar; piano
- Years active: 1970–2002
- Labels: CBS; Sony; Hellcat; Mercury
- Formerly of: The Clash; the 101ers; the Pogues; the Mescaleros
- Website: joestrummer.com

John Graham Mellor (21 August 1952 – 22 December 2002), known professionally as Joe Strummer, was a British musician. He was the co-founder, lyricist, rhythm guitarist and lead vocalist of punk rock band the Clash.

Strummer's other career highlights included stints with the 101ers, the Latino Rockabilly War, the Mescaleros and the Pogues, as well as solo music, acting, scoring television shows and films and hosting the BBC Radio show London Calling. Strummer and the Clash were inducted into the Rock and Roll Hall of Fame in March 2003. In his remembrance, Strummer's friends and family established The Joe Strummer Foundation (initially known as Strummerville), a non-profit organisation that gives opportunities to musicians and supports projects around the world to create empowerment through music.

== Early life ==
Strummer was born John Graham Mellor in Ankara, Turkey, on 21 August 1952, the son of a Scottish mother and English father. His mother, Anna Mackenzie (1915–1986), was the daughter of a crofter and was born and raised in Bonar Bridge; she later became a nurse. His father, Ronald Ralph Mellor MBE (1916–1984), was born in Lucknow, India, where his father worked as a railway official; Ronald Mellor became a clerical officer, who later attained the rank of second secretary in the foreign service. Through his father, Strummer had an Armenian great-grandfather who had lived in India and a German Jewish great-grandmother. At the age of nine, Strummer and his 10-year-old brother David began boarding at the City of London Freemen's School in Surrey and rarely saw their parents during the next seven years. He later said, "[A]t the age of nine I had to say good-bye to them because they went abroad to Africa or something. I went to boarding school and only saw them once a year after that – the Government paid for me to see my parents once a year. I was left on my own, and went to this school where thick rich people sent their thick rich kids. Another perk of my father's job – it was a job with a lot of perks – all the fees were paid by the Government."

Strummer developed a love of rock music by listening to records by Little Richard, the Beach Boys and Woody Guthrie. Strummer would even go by the nickname "Woody" for a few years. He would later refer to the Beach Boys as "the reason [he] played music". By 1970, his brother had become estranged from the family. His suicide in July of that year profoundly affected Strummer, as did having to identify his body after it had lain undiscovered for three days. Strummer said, "[David] was a year older than me. Funnily enough, you know, he was a Nazi. He was a member of the National Front. He was into the occult and he used to have these deaths-heads and cross-bones all over everything. He didn't like to talk to anybody, and I think suicide was the only way out for him. What else could he have done[?]"

After finishing his time at the City of London Freemen's School in 1970, Strummer moved on to the Central School of Art and Design in London, where he briefly considered becoming a professional cartoonist and completed a one-year foundation course. During this time, he shared a flat in Palmers Green with friends Clive Timperley and Tymon Dogg. He said, "I bought a ukulele. No kidding. I saved some money, £1.99 I think, and bought it down Shaftesbury Avenue. Then the guy I was busking with taught me to play 'Johnny B. Goode'. [...] I was on my own for the first time with this ukulele and 'Johnny B. Goode'. And that's how I started."

In 1973, Strummer moved to Newport, South Wales. He did not study at Newport College of Art, but he met up with college musicians at the students' union in Stow Hill and became the vocalist for Flaming Youth before renaming the band the Vultures. The Vultures included three former members of Rip Off Park Rock & Roll Allstars, the original college band co-founded by Terry Earl Taylor. For the next year, Strummer was the band's part-time singer and rhythm guitarist. During this time, he also worked as a gravedigger in St Woolos Cemetery. While in Newport, he wrote and recorded on an old reel-to-reel tape recorder "Crumby Bum Blues", which was later used in Julien Temple's 2007 film Joe Strummer: The Future Is Unwritten. In 1974, the band fell apart and Strummer moved back to London, where he met up again with Dogg. He was a street performer for a while and then decided to form another band with his roommates called the 101ers, named after the address of their squat at 101 Walterton Road in Maida Vale. The band played many gigs in London pubs, performing covers of popular American R&B and rock and roll songs. During this period, Strummer worked several occasional temporary jobs to fund the purchase of musical equipment, including time spent as a gardener in Hyde Park "to get the money for the guitar".

In 1975, he stopped calling himself Woody Mellor and adopted the stage name Joe Strummer, subsequently insisting that his friends call him by that name. The surname "Strummer" apparently referred to his role as rhythm guitarist in a self-deprecating way. Strummer was the lead singer of the 101ers and began to write original songs for the group. One song he wrote was inspired by the Slits' drummer Palmolive, who was his girlfriend at the time. The group liked the song "Keys to Your Heart", which they picked as their first single.

== Career ==
=== The Clash (1976–1986) ===
On 3 April 1976, the then-unknown Sex Pistols opened for the 101ers at a venue called the Nashville Room in London and Strummer was impressed by them. Sometime after the show, Strummer was approached by Bernie Rhodes and Mick Jones. Jones was from the band London SS and wanted Strummer to join as lead singer. Strummer agreed to leave the 101ers and join Jones, bassist Paul Simonon, drummer Terry Chimes and guitarist Keith Levene. The band was named the Clash by Simonon and made their debut on 4 July 1976 in Sheffield, opening for the Sex Pistols at the Black Swan (also known as the Mucky Duck, now known as the Boardwalk). On 25 January 1977, the band signed with CBS Records as a three-piece after Levene was fired from the band and Chimes quit. Topper Headon later became the band's full-time drummer.

During his time with the Clash, Strummer, along with his bandmates, became notorious for getting into trouble with the law. On 10 June 1977, he and Headon were arrested for spray-painting the band's name on a wall in a hotel. On 20 May 1980, he was arrested for hitting a violent member of the audience with his guitar during a performance in Hamburg, Germany. This incident shocked Strummer and had a lasting personal impact on him. Strummer said, "It was a watershed—violence had really controlled me for once". He determined never again to fight violence with violence.

Before the album Combat Rock was released in 1982, Strummer went into hiding and the band's management said that he had "disappeared". Bernie Rhodes, the band's manager, pressured Strummer to do so because tickets were selling slowly for the Scottish leg of an upcoming tour. It was planned for Strummer to travel, in secret, to Texas and stay with his friend, musician Joe Ely. Uneasy with his decision, Strummer instead decided to genuinely disappear and "dicked around" in France. During this time, Strummer ran the London Marathon in April 1982. He claimed his training regimen consisted of 10 pints of beer the night before the race. For this period of time, Strummer's whereabouts were a mystery not only to the public, but to the band's management as well. Strummer said later that this was a huge mistake and that you "have to have some regrets". This was in spite of the popular success of the single "Rock the Casbah". During this time, band members began to argue frequently and, with tensions high, the group began to fall apart.

In September 1983, Strummer fired Mick Jones. Topper Headon had earlier been kicked out of the band because of his heroin addiction and Terry Chimes was brought back temporarily to fill his place until the permanent replacement, Pete Howard, could be found. This left the band with only two of its original members, Strummer and Simonon. Rhodes persuaded Strummer to carry on, adding two new guitarists. Under this lineup, they released the album Cut the Crap in 1985. The album was panned by fans and critics alike and Strummer disbanded the Clash.

At the band's induction into the Rock and Roll Hall of Fame, the Clash was said to be "considered one of the most overtly political, explosive and exciting bands in rock and roll history".

Their songs tackled social decay, unemployment, racism, police brutality, political and social repression and militarism in detail. Strummer was involved with the Anti-Nazi League and Rock Against Racism campaigns. He later also gave his support to the Rock Against the Rich series of concerts organised by the anarchist organisation Class War. The Clash's London Calling album was voted best album of the 1980s by Rolling Stone magazine (although it was released in late 1979 in the UK, it was not released until 1980 in the US).

=== Solo career and soundtrack work (1986–1999) ===
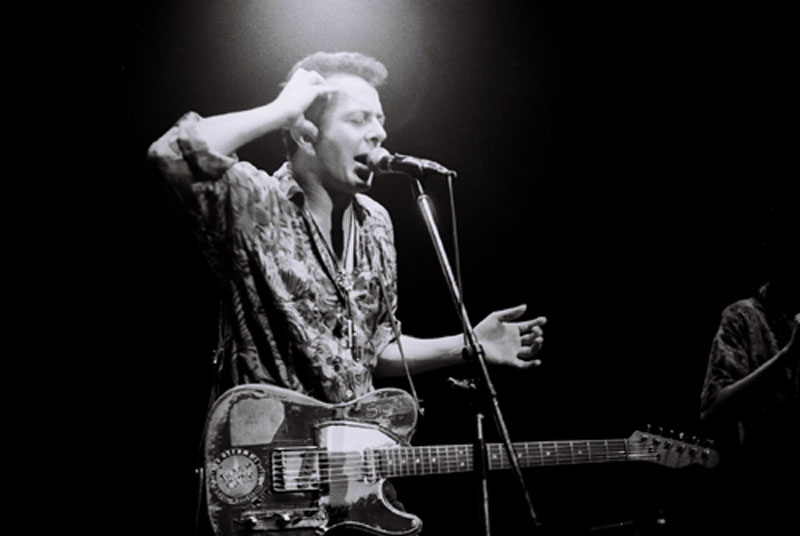
Strummer, backing with the Pogues in Japan

A year later, Strummer worked on several songs for the 1986 film Sid and Nancy, including "Love Kills" and "Dum Dum Club". Strummer also later worked with Mick Jones and his band Big Audio Dynamite, contributing to the band's second studio album, No. 10, Upping St.(1986), by co-writing most of the songs as well as producing the album along with Jones.

In 1987, he played a small part in the film Walker, directed by Alex Cox, as a character named "Faucet", and wrote and performed on the film's soundtrack. He starred in another Cox film that same year called Straight to Hell, as the character Simms. Straight to Hell also featured London-Irish folk/punk band the Pogues, both as actors and contributors to the soundtrack. Strummer joined the Pogues for a tour in 1987/88, filling in for ailing guitarist Philip Chevron, who wrote (in May 2008) on the band's online forum: "When I was sick in late 1987, I taught Joe all the guitar parts in an afternoon and he was on tour in the US as deputy guitarist the next day. Joe wrote all the tabs in his meticulously neat hand on a long piece of paper which he taped to the top of the guitar so he could glance down occasionally when he was onstage." This tour would be the first of several collaborations with the band.

In 1989, Strummer appeared in Jim Jarmusch's film Mystery Train as a drunken, short-tempered drifter named Johnny (whom most characters refer to as Elvis, much to Johnny's dismay). He made a cameo appearance in Aki Kaurismäki's 1990 film I Hired a Contract Killer as a guitarist in a pub, performing two songs ("Burning Lights" and "Afro-Cuban Bebop"). These were released as a promotional 7-inch single limited to a few hundred copies, credited to "Joe Strummer & the Astro Physicians". The "Astro Physicians" were in fact the Pogues ("Afro-Cuban Bebop" got a re-release on the Pogues' 2008 box set). During this time Strummer continued to act, write and produce soundtracks for various films, most notably the soundtrack for Grosse Pointe Blank (1997).

In 1989 Strummer produced a solo record with the band the Latino Rockabilly War. The album Earthquake Weather was a critical and commercial flop and resulted in the loss of his contract with Sony Records. He also did the soundtrack to the movie Permanent Record with this band.

Strummer was asked by the Pogues, who were fracturing as a band, to help them produce their next album, released in 1990 as Hell's Ditch. In 1991, he replaced Shane MacGowan as singer of the Pogues for a tour after MacGowan's departure from the band. One night of this tour was professionally recorded, and three tracks ("I Fought the Law", "London Calling", and "Turkish Song of the Damned") have seen release as B-sides and again on the Pogues' 2008 box set.

On 16 April 1994, Strummer joined Czech-American band Dirty Pictures on stage in Prague at the Repre Club in Obecni Dum at "Rock for Refugees", a benefit concert for people left displaced by the war in Bosnia. Although the set appeared impromptu, Strummer and the band had spent the days leading up to the event rehearsing and "hanging out" in Prague. The show began with "London Calling" and without pause went into "Brand New Cadillac". In the middle of the song, the power went out. Once the power was back on, Strummer asked the audience whether or not they would mind if the band started over. They then began again with "London Calling" and continued on for another half-hour.

After these self-described "wilderness years", Strummer began working with other bands; he played piano on the 1995 UK hit of the Levellers, "Just the One" and appeared on the Black Grape single "England's Irie" in 1996. In 1997, while in New York City, he worked with noted producer and engineer Lee "Scratch" Perry on remixed Clash and 101ers reissue dub material. In collaboration with percussionist Pablo Cook, Strummer wrote and performed the soundtrack to Tunnel of Love (Robert Wallace 1997) that was featured in the Cannes Film Festival in the same year.

In 1997, Strummer played the character of "Brand New Cadillac" songwriter Vince Taylor in F. J. Ossang's road movie Doctor Chance.

In 1998, he made a guest appearance on the animated television show, South Park and appeared on the album Chef Aid: The South Park Album featuring songs from and inspired by the series.

During this time, Strummer was engaged in a legal dispute with the Clash's record label, Epic Records. The disagreement lasted nearly eight years and ended with the label agreeing to let him record solo records with another label. If the Clash were to reunite though, they would have to record for Sony. During the nineties, Strummer was a DJ on the BBC World Service with his half-hour programme London Calling. Samples from the series provide the vocals for "Midnight Jam" on Joe Strummer and the Mescaleros' final album Streetcore.

=== The Mescaleros and other work (1999–2002) ===
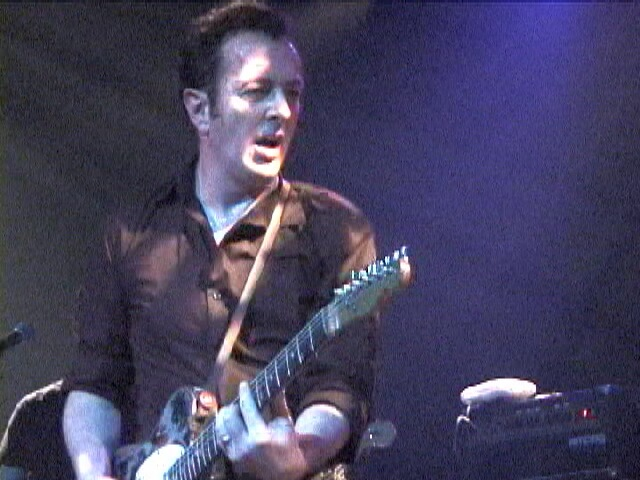
Strummer performing in April 2002

In the mid-to-late 1990s, Strummer gathered well regarded musicians into a backing band he called the Mescaleros. Strummer and the band signed with Mercury Records and released their first album in 1999, which was co-written with Antony Genn, called Rock Art and the X-Ray Style. A tour of England, Europe and North America soon followed.

The Mescaleros expanded on the genre-blending creative renaissance for Strummer had first explored with The Clash, combining punk with world music, reggae and electronica.

This is my Indian summer ... I learnt that fame is an illusion and everything about it is just a joke. I'm far more dangerous now, because I don't care at all.

— Joe Strummer to Chris Salewicz – 2000

In 2001, the band signed with Californian punk label Hellcat Records and released their second studio album, Global a Go-Go. The album was supported with a 21-date tour of North America, Britain and Ireland. Once again, these concerts featured Clash material ("London's Burning", "Rudie Can't Fail", "(White Man) In Hammersmith Palais"), as well as covers of reggae and ska hits ("The Harder They Come", "A Message to You, Rudy") and the band regularly closed the show by playing the Ramones' "Blitzkrieg Bop". He covered Bob Marley's "Redemption Song" with Johnny Cash.

On 15 November 2002, Strummer and the Mescaleros played a benefit show for striking fire fighters in London, at Acton Town Hall. An encore followed with Mick Jones playing guitar and singing on "White Riot" and "London's Burning". This performance marked the first time since 1983 that Strummer and Jones had performed together on stage.

Strummer's final regular gig was at Liverpool Academy on 22 November 2002, yet his final performance, just two weeks before his death, was in a small club venue 'The Palace' in Bridgwater, Somerset, near his home. Shortly before his death, Strummer and U2's Bono co-wrote a song, "46664", for Nelson Mandela as part of a campaign against AIDS in Africa.

== Personal life ==
Strummer became a vegetarian in 1971 and remained so until his death in 2002.

In 1975, Strummer accepted £120 (equivalent to £930 in 2025) to marry South African citizen Pamela Moolman so she could obtain British citizenship (before the British Nationality Act 1981 came into force) by doing so. He used the money to buy his signature Fender Telecaster. In 1978, at the age of 26, he started a relationship with Gaby Salter shortly after her 17th birthday. The couple remained together for 14 years and had two daughters, Jazz and Lola, but did not marry as Strummer had been unable to locate and divorce Moolman. During his relationship with Salter, he had multiple affairs. In 1993, he began an affair with Lucinda Tait, which finally ended his relationship with Salter. He was married to Tait from 1995 until his death in 2002.

Strummer described himself as a socialist and explained, "I believe in socialism because it seems more humanitarian, rather than every man for himself and 'I'm alright Jack' and all those arsehole businessmen with all the loot. I made up my mind from viewing society from that angle. That's where I'm from and there's where I've made my decisions from. That's why I believe in socialism."

Strummer held an interest in the Spanish Civil War.

== Death ==
On 22 December 2002, aged 50, Strummer was found dead by his wife at his home in Broomfield, Somerset. A post mortem showed that he died from a heart attack caused by an undiagnosed congenital heart defect. His estate was valued at just under £1 million and he left all the money to Tait, his wife. Strummer was cremated and his ashes given to his family.

== Legacy ==
At the time of his death, Strummer was working on another Mescaleros album, which was released posthumously in October 2003 under the title Streetcore. The album features a tribute to Johnny Cash, "Long Shadow", which was written for Cash to sing and recorded in Rick Rubin's garage, as well as a remembrance of the terrorist attacks on 11 September 2001 ("Ramshackle Day Parade") and a cover of Bob Marley's "Redemption Song", which Strummer had also recorded as a duet with Cash. The Cash/Strummer duet version appears on the 2003 box set Unearthed. Strummer and the Mescaleros were scheduled to open for Pearl Jam on the 2003 Riot Act Tour.

Memorial to Strummer on 7th Street at Avenue A, New York City

In November 2003, a video for "Redemption Song" was released, featuring graffiti artist REVOLT painting a memorial mural of Strummer on the wall of the Niagara Bar in the East Village of New York City. In 2013, the mural was destroyed due to construction; a new mural was unveiled that September, accompanied by a large celebration with Mick Jones in attendance.

Strummer was instrumental in setting up Future Forests (since rechristened the Carbon Neutral Company), dedicated to planting trees in various parts of the world to combat global warming. Strummer was the first artist to make the recording, pressing and distribution of his records carbon neutral through the planting of trees. In his remembrance, Strummer's friends and family have established the Strummerville Foundation for the promotion of new music, which holds an annual festival with the same name. In December 2016, a blue plaque was erected by Seymour Housing Co-operative at 33 Daventry Street near Marylebone station where he used to live when it was a squat and the Slits and Malcolm McLaren all lived nearby.

In January 2003, the Clash were inducted into the Rock and Roll Hall of Fame. At the Grammy Awards in February 2003, "London Calling" was performed by Elvis Costello, Bruce Springsteen, Steven Van Zandt, Dave Grohl, Pete Thomas and Tony Kanal in tribute to Strummer. In the same month at the rock club Debaser in Stockholm some of Sweden's better known rock musicians paid their tribute to Strummer by performing songs written by the Clash (the exception was Nicke Borg and Dregen from Backyard Babies, who performed "I Fought the Law", which the Clash had covered). At the end of the concert, the Swedish punk band Ebba Grön reunited for the tribute, aided by Mick Jones on guitar.

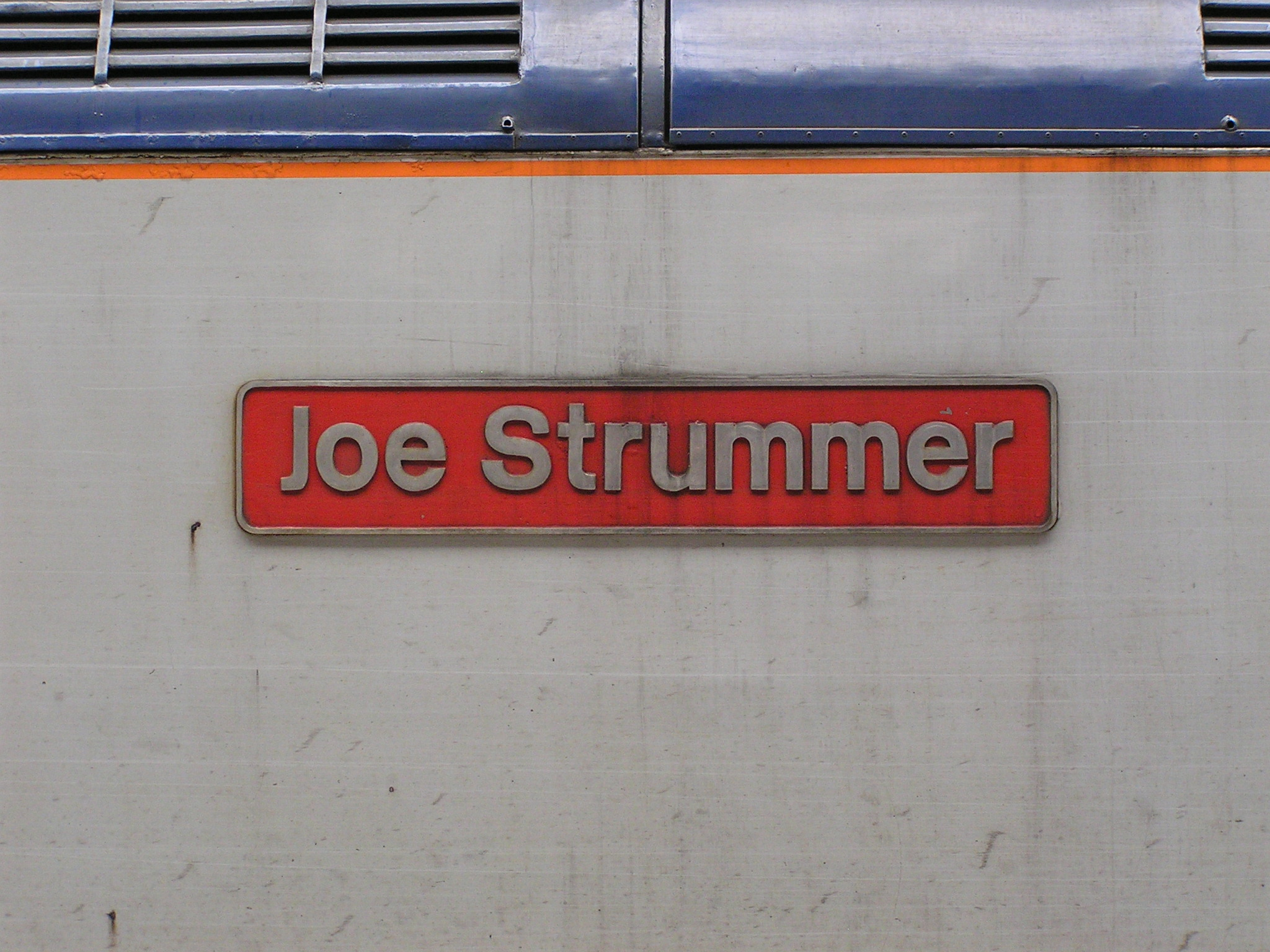
Joe Strummer nameplates on Cotswold Rail locomotive 47828 in June 2009

On 22 December 2003, a year after his death, a tribute show/benefit was held at Irving Plaza in NYC. Bands that played were: Ari Up; Clem Snide; the Detachment Kit; Dirty Mary; Hammel on Trial; Jesse Malin; New Blood Revival; the Realistics; Eugene Hütz; Radio 4; Secret Army; Ted Leo; Vic Thrill & the Saturn Missile.

The Belfast punk rock group Stiff Little Fingers recorded a tribute song "Strummerville" on their 2003 album, Guitar and Drum. In 2004 Al Barr, lead singer of the Boston punk band Dropkick Murphys, named his son Strummer in honour of Strummer. German band Beatsteaks paid tribute to Strummer on their 2004 album Smack Smash with the song "Hello Joe". In 2004, German punk band Die Toten Hosen released an EP called "Friss oder stirb", which included a tribute song for Strummer called "Goodbye Garageland"; it is a lyrical co-production with Matt Dangerfield from London's 77 punk band the Boys. Attila the Stockbroker's Barnstormer released "Comandante Joe" on their 2004 album Zero Tolerance.

In February 2005 Cotswold Rail locomotive 47828 was named Joe Strummer by his widow Lucinda Tait at Bristol Temple Meads railway station. On 22 July 2005 Tait unveiled a plaque on the house in Pentonville, Newport where Strummer lived from 1973 to 1974 and where his first foray into recorded music, "Crummy Bum Blues" was recorded. "That Was Clash Radio", a 2005 short story which Charles de Lint, wrote in response to Strummer's death featuring Strummer in a minor role.

New Orleans–based rockers Cowboy Mouth released a song called "Joe Strummer" on their 2006 album Voodoo Shoppe. The Red Hot Chili Peppers also recorded a tribute song called "Joe" as part of the recording sessions for their album Stadium Arcadium, releasing the outtake as a B-side to their single Desecration Smile in 2007. A play by Paul Hodson called Meeting Joe Strummer premiered at the 2006 Edinburgh Festival and toured the UK the following year.

On-stage Strummer wires himself up into an inhuman dynamo of sweaty, trembling flesh, fearful enough to have one wondering when the ambulance brigade will rush to his rescue with a straitjacket. While he tilts his bullet head at acute angles, his agonising face screwed into an open wound, he wields his Telecaster like a chain saw. His magnetism is totally original – more like an Olympic strong man imploding all his energy into a final record-breaking lift than anything seen on a rock'n'roll stage before.
Off-stage, he's the Clash member with the lowest profile.

— Caroline Coon

In conjunction with the Strummer estate, Fender released the Joe Strummer Tribute Telecaster in 2007, combining elements of Strummer's main guitars, namely an attempt at the "road worn" finish of his 1966 Telecaster, which he used until his death. The neck profile was an exact duplicate of Strummer's '66 Telecaster, while the guitar's finish was an approximation of the wear. The first 1,500 guitars came with a Shepard Fairey designed "Customisation kit" with stickers and stencils, which resembled some of the designs Strummer used on his guitars.

Boston punk rock band Street Dogs recorded a tribute song called "The General's Boombox" on their 2007 album State of Grace. New Jersey's the Gaslight Anthem recorded the song "I'da Called You Woody, Joe" on their 2008 album Sink or Swim. The Hold Steady reference Strummer's impact in the song "Constructive Summer" on their 2008 album Stay Positive, singing "Raise a toast to Saint Joe Strummer. I think he might have been our only decent teacher." In November 2009, Tonara, a town in Sardinia, Italy, dedicated a street to Joe Strummer.

On 22 December 2010, CJAM 99.1 FM, a radio station in Windsor, Ontario, Canada, declared the anniversary of Strummer's death "Joe Strummer Day to confront poverty in Windsor-Detroit." For 24-hours, the station played nothing but Strummer-related music, wrapping the sounds around reports about poverty in the Windsor-Detroit region. CJAM (which is located near the banks of the Detroit River, a kilometre from downtown Detroit) has since decided to make it an annual event and hosted its 10th annual Joe Strummer Day on 22 December 2019.

In January 2011 a motion was started to grant Strummer his own street in the Spanish city of Granada.

On 21 August 2012, which would have been Strummer's 60th birthday, Hellcat Records released an exclusive 57-song digital download album titled Joe Strummer & the Mescaleros: The Hellcat Years. The album features Strummer's three Hellcat albums along with various b-sides and live songs, including Strummer's 15 November 2002 concert with Mick Jones. In September 2012, Hellcat announced the re-release of remastered versions of Strummer's three Hellcat records on both CD and vinyl. Hellcat released Strummer's 15 November 2002 concert, Live at Acton Town Hall on 23 November 2012.

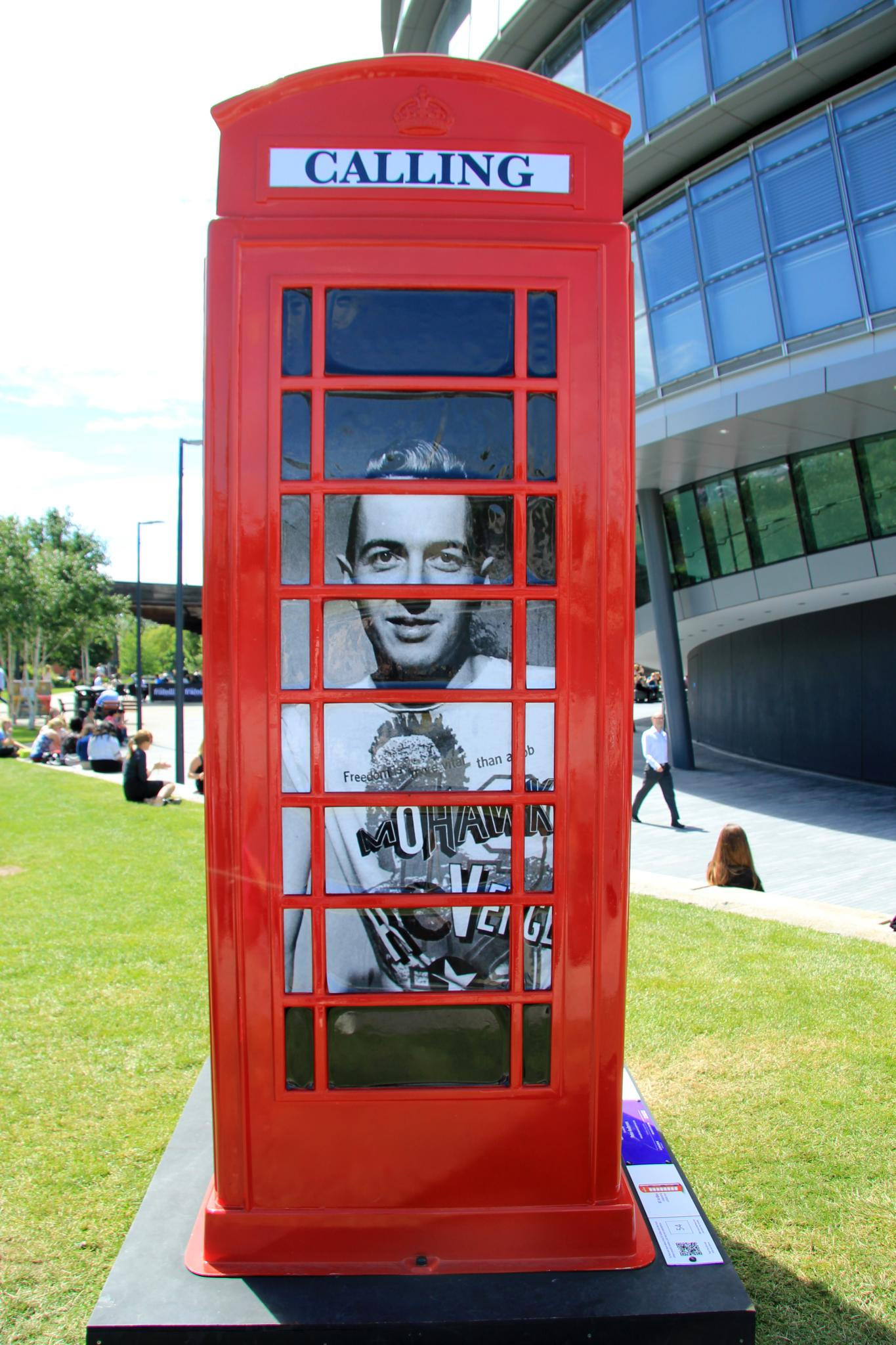
BT-commissioned "London Calling" artwork on a red telephone box in 2012 displaying Strummer

In 2012, marking 25 years of Childline (the free counselling service for children and young people in the UK), BT commissioned artists to design and decorate full-sized K6 red telephone box replicas, with Strummer featuring in an artwork titled "London Calling".

In January 2013 Joe Strummer had a plaza named in his honour, Placeta Joe Strummer, in the Spanish city of Granada, about 650m south of the Alhambra. In June 2013 a mural of Strummer was unveiled on the corner of Portobello Road and Blenheim Crescent and attended by a number of Strummer's former friends including Mick Jones and Ray Gange. In an October 2013 interview, Mick Jones confirmed that Strummer had intentions of reforming the Clash and new music was even being written. In the months prior to Strummer's death, he and Jones got together to write new music. Jones said at the time he assumed the new songs would be used on albums with the Mescaleros. A few months following their work together, Jones ran into Strummer at an event and asked him what he intended to do with those songs. Strummer informed Jones that they were going to be used for the next Clash record.

In 2016, actor Jonathan Rhys Meyers portrayed Strummer in the film London Town which tells the story of a Clash-obsessed teenager who crosses paths with Joe Strummer by happenstance in 1979 and finds his life changing as a result. The film was met with mixed reviews.

It was discovered following Strummer's death that he had maintained a personal archive of his own work stored in his Somerset barn, containing 20,000 items including tapes, lyrics and letters. It formed the basis of a 32-song compilation album titled Joe Strummer 001, released in 2018. The album was curated by producer Robert Gordon McHarg III and Strummer's widow, Lucinda Tait, and features rare, unreleased and remastered recordings spanning his entire career, including work from the 101ers, The Clash, the Mescaleros and solo demos. Critics praised the collection as a comprehensive portrait of Strummer's artistic breadth and a posthumous reaffirmation of his legacy. Notably, it included previously unreleased collaborations with Mick Jones and unreleased Clash material, sparking renewed critical interest in his post-Clash years.

In September 2018, Warner/Chappell Music signed a publishing contract with the Strummer estate. The deal includes Strummer's solo career, Cut the Crap by the Clash, the soundtracks to three films and his compositions with the 101ers and the Mescaleros.

In 2023, Rolling Stone ranked Strummer at number 125 on its list of the 200 Greatest Singers of All Time.

== Musical equipment ==
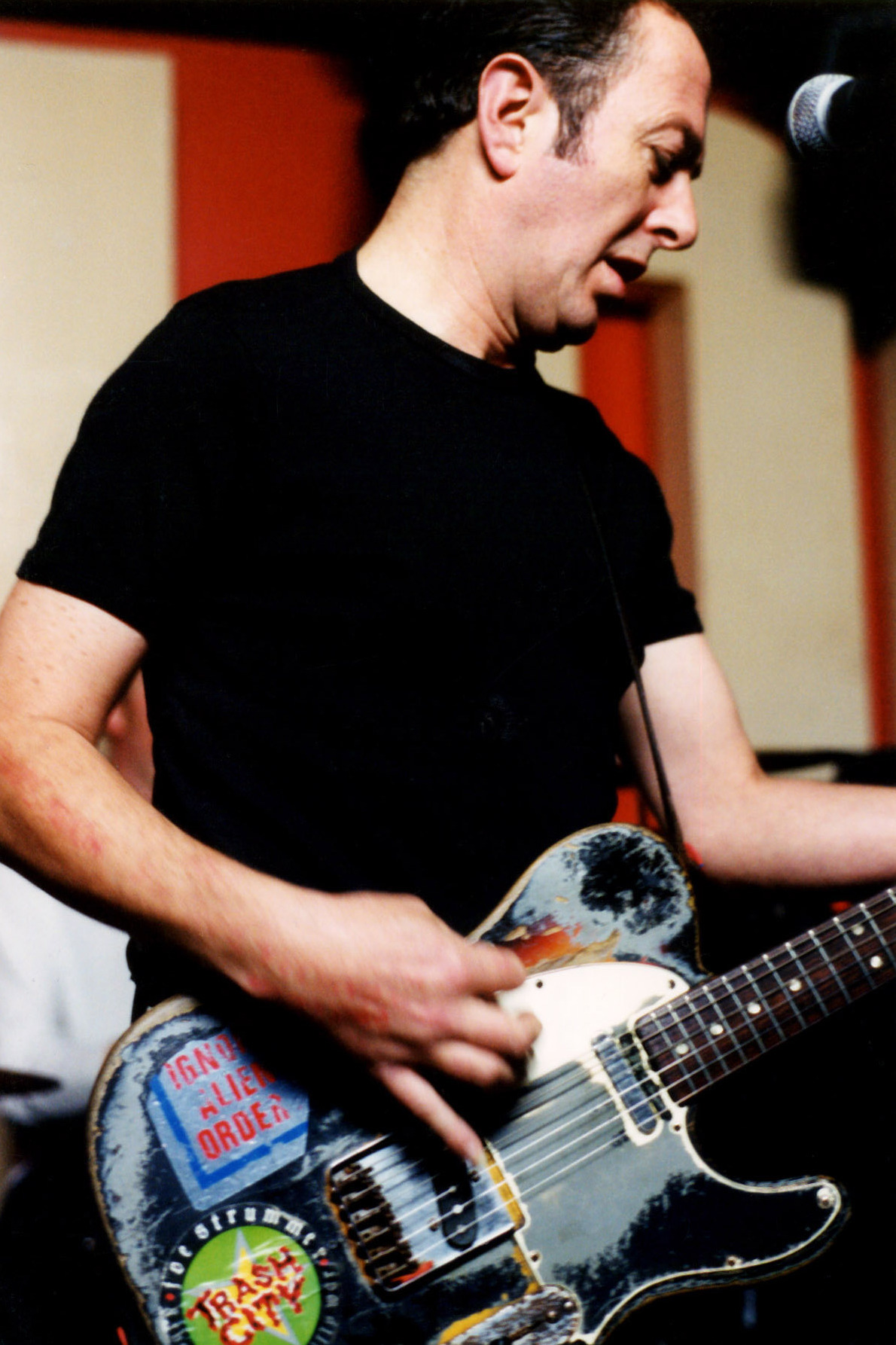
Strummer in 2001 with his guitar

Strummer's main guitar throughout his career was a 1966 Fender Telecaster. Strummer bought the guitar in its original sunburst finish in 1975, with the £120 he was paid to marry Afrikaaner Pamela Moolman, thereby allowing Moolman to remain in Britain. After joining the Clash, the guitar's body and pickguard were refinished in grey auto primer and then painted black. Over the years, the guitar would see numerous sticker configurations, with the most prominent and longest-lasting one stating "Ignore Alien Orders". Years of heavy wear and taped on set lists remain on the guitar to this day, and the only known modifications to it included the installation of an individual, six-saddle bridge and Fender "f-style" tuning machines.

The Fender Custom Shop created a Joe Strummer tribute Telecaster in 2007 with a reliced flat black finish and an exact replica of the neck profile of his '66 Telecaster.

Strummer was naturally left-handed, but was taught to play guitar right-handed by his friend Tymon Dogg. Strummer had reckoned his left-handedness on a right-hand guitar as a drawback and claimed it caused him to be underdeveloped as a guitarist, although his style of playing was unique.

He also used three Fender Esquire models, one from 1952, a white blonde with slab fretboard from the mid-1950s and another from early to mid-1960s with a white pick guard and rosewood fingerboard. The Esquire is a one-pickup version of the Telecaster. Prior to using any Telecaster oriented guitar, before buying his 1966 model, he used as main guitars a Gretsch White Falcon and a 1964 Hofner Verithin. For amplification Strummer was known to use amplifiers such as a Roland Jazz Chorus, a Selmer Bassman while he was in the 101ers, a Vox AC30 and various Marshall amplifiers, but his main amplifier was a Music Man HD 212,150. Strummer commented on his choice of amplifier with "I don't have time to search for those old Fender tube amps. The Music Man is the closest thing to that sound I've found" and that the "plastic motif on the front is repulsive."

== Discography ==
=== The 101ers ===
| Year | Album | Additional information |
|---|---|---|
| 1981 | Elgin Avenue Breakdown | Compilation album with material recorded from 1974 to 1976. |
| 2007 | Joe Strummer: The Future Is Unwritten | Soundtrack to the documentary of the same name |
| 2018 | Joe Strummer 001 | 32-song collection featuring remastered, unreleased and alternate versions of songs from Strummer's career |

=== Solo ===
| Year | Album | Additional information |
|---|---|---|
| 1986 | Sid and Nancy | Soundtrack for the film Sid and Nancy, featuring 2 songs by Strummer. "Love Kills" and "Dum Dum Club" |
| 1987 | Walker (soundtrack) | Soundtrack for the film Walker, scored by Strummer. |
| 1987 | Straight to Hell (soundtrack) | Soundtrack for the film Straight to Hell, featuring 2 songs by Strummer. |
| 1993 | When Pigs Fly (soundtrack) | Unreleased soundtrack for the film When Pigs Fly, scored by Strummer. |
| 1998 | Chef Aid: The South Park Album | Features "It's A Rockin' World", performed by Strummer, Flea, Nick Hexum, Tom Morello, DJ Bonebrake and Benmont Tench. |
| 1999 | Michael Hutchence (guest appearance) | Backing vocals on the first track on Michael Hutchence's solo album, "Let Me Show You" |
| 2000 | Free the West Memphis 3 | Features a cover of "The Harder They Come", performed by Strummer and Long Beach Dub Allstars |
| 2002 | Jools Holland's Big Band Rhythm & Blues (guest appearance) | Features "Return of the Blues Cowboy" performed by Strummer and the Jools Holland Big Band |
| 2003 | Unearthed (guest appearance) | A duet of "Redemption Song" with Johnny Cash. |
| 2004 | Black Magic (guest appearance) | Strummer performed the song "Over the Border" with Jimmy Cliff. |
| 2007 | Joe Strummer: The Future Is Unwritten | Soundtrack to the documentary of the same name |
| 2018 | Joe Strummer 001 | 32-song collection featuring remastered, unreleased and alternate versions of songs from Strummer's career |
| 2021 | Assembly | 16-track compilation features three previously unreleased versions of classic Clash tracks, "Junco Partner (Acoustic)", "Rudie Can't Fail" & "I Fought The Law" (Both tracks are recorded live at Brixton Academy, London, 24 November 2001) |

=== The Latino Rockabilly War ===
| Year | Album | Additional information |
|---|---|---|
| 1988 | Permanent Record Original Soundtrack | Features songs by Strummer and the Latino Rockabilly War. |
| 1989 | Earthquake Weather | Strummer's only studio album with the Latino Rockabilly War. |
| 2007 | Joe Strummer: The Future is Unwritten | Soundtrack to the documentary of the same name |
| 2018 | Joe Strummer 001 | 32-song collection featuring remastered, unreleased and alternate versions of songs from Strummer's career |

=== The Mescaleros ===
| Year | Album | Additional information |
|---|---|---|
| 1999 | Rock Art and the X-Ray Style | Strummer's first album with the Mescaleros. |
| 2001 | Global a Go-Go | Reached number 23 on Billboard's Top Independent Albums chart in the US. |
| 2002 | Black Hawk Down | Soundtrack for the film features a much shorter version of "Minstrel Boy". The longer version appeared on Global a Go-Go |
| 2003 | Streetcore | Strummer's last album, released posthumously. |
| 2003 | Joe Strummer: The Future is Unwritten | Soundtrack of the documentary of the same name |
| 2012 | Joe Strummer & the Mescaleros: The Hellcat Years | Digital download only 57-song set featuring three Hellcat albums, various b-sides and Strummer's 15 November 2002 concert |
| 2012 | Live at Acton Town Hall | Record Store Day exclusive 2-LP vinyl album limited to 2200 copies featuring Strummer's 15 November 2002 concert. Re-released on vinyl & CD in 2023. |
| 2018 | Joe Strummer 001 | 32-song collection featuring remastered, unreleased and alternate versions of songs from Strummer's career |
| 2021 | Assembly | 16-track compilation features three previously unreleased versions of classic Clash tracks, "Junco Partner (Acoustic)", "Rudie Can't Fail" & "I Fought The Law" (Both tracks are recorded live at Brixton Academy, London, 24 November 2001) |
| 2022 | Joe Strummer 002: The Mescaleros Years | Box set featuring remastered editions of all three of the band's studio albums along with 15 rare and unreleased tracks |

== Music videos ==
List of music videos, showing year released and director
| Title | Year | Director |
|---|---|---|
| "Love Kills" | 1986 | —N/a |
| "Trash City" | 1988 | —N/a |
| "Gangsterville" | 1989 | —N/a |
| "Generations" | 1996 | —N/a |
| "Yalla Yalla" | 1999 | —N/a |
| "Tony Adams" | 1999 | —N/a |
| "Johnny Appleseed" | 2001 | —N/a |
| "Coma Girl" | 2003 | —N/a |
| "Redemption Song" | 2003 | —N/a |
| "London is Burning" | 2018 | Kevin Petillo |
| "Junco Partner (Acoustic)" | 2021 | Spencer Ramsey |
| "I Fought the Law (Live)" | 2021 | —N/a |
| "The Road to Rock 'N' Roll (Demo)" | 2022 | —N/a |

== Selected filmography ==
Let's Rock Again! is a 2004 one-hour music documentary, directed by Dick Rude, which follows Strummer touring in America and Japan with the Mescaleros and premiered at the Tribeca Film Festival in New York, May 2004.

Redemption Song: The Ballad of Joe Strummer is a 2006 biography of Strummer by Chris Salewicz.

Joe Strummer: The Future Is Unwritten is a 2007 documentary about Joe Strummer by Julien Temple. It comprises archive footage of him spanning his life and interviews with friends, family and other celebrities. It debuted at the 2007 Sundance Film Festival.

Tribute Concert: Cast a Long Shadow is a recording of the October 2007 tribute and benefit concert held in honour of Joe Strummer in Los Angeles. It features Love & Rockets, Zander Schloss, Hellride and many other artists, released in DVD format in December 2010.

Let Fury Have the Hour is a 2012 documentary directed by Antonino D'Ambrosio, in which the figure of Strummer "looms large in the background". The movie debuted at the 2012 Tribeca Film Festival.

Quiero tener una ferretería en Andalucía is a 2012 documentary about Joe Strummer's relationship with Andalucia.

I Need a Dodge! Joe Strummer on the Run is a 2014 documentary by Nick Hall.

| Year | Title | Role | Other notes |
|---|---|---|---|
| 1980 | Rude Boy | semi-documentary subject | |
| 1983 | Hell W10 | Writer and director | silent film |
| 1983 | The King of Comedy | Street Scum | non-speaking cameo |
| 1987 | Walker | Faucet | |
| 1987 | Straight to Hell | Simms | |
| 1988 | Candy Mountain | Mario | |
| 1989 | Mystery Train | Johnny aka Elvis | |
| 1990 | I Hired a Contract Killer | Himself | by Aki Kaurismäki |
| 1997 | Doctor Chance (French: Docteur Chance) | as Vince Taylor | by F. J. Ossang |
| 2000 | The Clash: Westway to the World | documentary subject | |
| 2003 | End of the Century: The Story of the Ramones | documentary subject | |
| 2004 | Let's Rock Again! | documentary subject | |
| 2007 | Joe Strummer: The Future Is Unwritten | documentary subject | |
| 2008 | The Clash Live: Revolution Rock | documentary subject | |
| 2011 | Quiero Tener Una Ferreteria En Andalucia | documentary subject | |
| 2012 | The Rise and Fall of the Clash | documentary subject | by Danny Garcia |
| 2014 | I Need a Dodge! Joe Strummer on the run | documentary subject | by Nick Hall |
