= The Mescaleros =

British backing band for Joe Strummer (1999–2002)

Background information
- Genres: Alternative rock; post-punk; punk rock; folk rock; reggae rock
- Years active: 1999–2002
- Label: Hellcat
- Spinoff of: The Clash
- Past members: Joe Strummer; Martin Slattery; Scott Shields; Antony Genn; Simon Stafford; Tymon Dogg; John Blackburn; Jimmy Hogarth; Pablo Cook; Luke Bullen; Steve "Smiley" Barnard
- Website: www.myspace.com/themescaleros

The Mescaleros was the British backing band for British singer, musician and songwriter Joe Strummer. Formed in 1999, they issued two albums before Strummer's death from a heart attack in 2002 aged 50, and one posthumously.

Many of the band members were multi-instrumentalists. The original line up consisted of Strummer on vocals and guitar; Antony Genn on guitar; Scott Shields on bass, guitar and drums; Martin Slattery on keyboards, guitar, occasional flute and saxophone; Pablo Cook on percussion; Steve "Smiley" Barnard on drums; and Richard Flack on various instruments.

The name "The Mescaleros" for my new group is something I just stole from a cowboy film I was watching one night. So, um, really, doesn't have any meaning to the direction. But we're moving in a kind of roots reggae, rock thing. I mean, more or less, as if time hadn't passed. But, we're trying to move it into the future as well. Definitely don't wanna stay in the past. Gotta get out of the past! It's a quagmire of treacle.

— Joe Strummer, 1999, Hultsfred Festival, Sweden

The Mescaleros arose from Strummer's work with Pablo Cook and Richard Norris. The three of them originally came together to write the soundtracks for two short films, Tunnel of Love, and Question of Honour. The song "Yalla Yalla" was originally written by this trio, and mixed by Antony Genn. Once Genn was brought on board, a new song "Techno D-Day" was recorded, at which point Strummer, at the behest of Genn, began recording a new record.

The original drummer, Ged Lynch, left the band before recording on the Rock Art and the X-Ray Style album was complete and Steve Barnard, previously with Robbie Williams, was brought in to finish recording. Shields and Slattery were recruited through a number of contacts with the band. Slattery had also appeared on Williams' Life thru a Lens album, and Shields was a friend of Slattery's. Oddly enough, in the initial lineup, only Smiley was playing the instrument which he knew best.

Genn reportedly did not have the ability to play sufficient lead guitar, so multi-instrumentalist Slattery, originally trained on horns and keyboards, was brought in. Strummer once joked that Slattery could play a hole in the windshield of the tour bus. Shields had previously been a drummer but was recruited to play bass, and later played guitar.

== History ==
The Mescaleros' first gig was on 5 June 1999 at the Leadmill in Antony Genn's hometown of Sheffield. They toured extensively for the next six months in the US and Europe, appearing as well at the Glastonbury Festival. In 2000 the band played Big Day Out in Australia and New Zealand, as well as touring Japan.

The band signed with the Californian punk label Hellcat Records, and issued three albums. Following the release of the first, Rock Art and the X-Ray Style, they toured England and North America; sets included several Clash-fan favourites.

Singer-songwriter Tymon Dogg, a longtime friend of Joe Strummer, joined the band in 2000 playing violin and Spanish guitar. He contributed some of the tunes on Global a Go-Go, including "Mondo Bongo".

Honorary Mescaleros include John Blackburn and Jimmy Hogarth, both of whom played bass in place of Scott Shields on the 2000 tour supporting the Who, which was also Tymon Dogg's first tour with the band. Andy Boo, Strummer's guitar tech, also appeared in the Mescaleros line up in place of Pablo Cook on percussion at a gig in Finland 1999.

Following the departure of Genn and Smiley, Scott Shields moved to guitar, Simon Stafford was brought on board to play bass, and Luke Bullen was recruited to play drums. Pablo Cook left in August 2001 to join Moby.

Following the release of Global a Go-Go, Joe Strummer and the Mescaleros mounted a 21-date tour of North America, Britain, and Ireland. Once again, these concerts featured Clash material ("London Calling", "Rudie Can't Fail"), as well as classic covers of reggae hits ("The Harder They Come", "A Message to You, Rudy") and regularly closed the show with a nod to Joey Ramone by playing the Ramones' "Blitzkrieg Bop".

Musically, the Mescaleros continued the genre mixing that Strummer was known for during his time with the Clash. Elements of reggae, jazz, funk, hip-hop, country, and of course punk rock can be found in the three Mescaleros releases.

The band is also the subject of a documentary by Dick Rude titled Let's Rock Again! which was released on 27 June 2006. The band also appear on many DVDs (see full list below) and have had several of their songs appear in major films such as Black Hawk Down and Mr. & Mrs. Smith. One song, "Johnny Appleseed," was used as the theme song to the HBO series John From Cincinnati.

Joe Strummer & the Mescaleros' last concert was on 22 November 2002, in Liverpool. This show is often overlooked however, in favor of citing the 15 November show at Acton Town Hall. It was this show, which was a benefit for striking fire fighters, that Mick Jones joined Strummer on stage for the first time in nearly twenty years, during the Clash song "Bankrobber". An encore followed with both "White Riot" and "London's Burning". The Last Night London Burned, a 64-page book written by George Binette, showing never before published pictures of Joe Strummer and Mick Jones, and a 26-minute film by Gregg McDonald and Alan Miles, were released as a unique visual record of that last London concert by Joe Strummer & the Mescaleros. Following the conclusion of this tour, the band headed straight for the studio, but Strummer died of a congenital heart defect on 22 December 2002 after returning home from walking his dogs.

The band's final album Streetcore was released, after Strummer's death, on 20 October 2003.

The band also made appearances on the Late Show with David Letterman, Late Night with Conan O'Brien, as well as touring on the Hootenany Festival in the summer of 2001.

Various Mescaleros members have performed at numerous tribute concerts in both UK and Europe. Pablo Cook and Smiley together with Mike Peters (the Alarm), Derek Forbes (Simple Minds), Steve Harris (Gary Numan) are members of Los Mondo Bongo, a celebration of the music of Joe Strummer, who together with Ray Gange (DJ) tour whenever possible, performing Mescaleros tunes.

Antony Genn currently fronts the Hours, a band that he and Martin Slattery formed in 2004.

In an October 2013 interview with BBC 6 Music, Mick Jones confirmed that in the months prior to Strummer's death, the two were writing new music together. At the time, Jones assumed the new songs would be on an upcoming Mescaleros album. But months later he ran into Strummer at an event, and Strummer informed him that the music was intended for a new Clash album.

== Members ==
- Joe Strummer – lead vocals, rhythm guitar
- Martin Slattery – guitar, keyboards, saxophone, flute
- Scott Shields – guitar (2000–2002), bass (1999–2000, 2001–2002)
- Antony Genn – guitar, keyboards, backing vocals (1999–2000)
- Simon Stafford – bass, trombone (2001–2002)
- Tymon Dogg – violin, Spanish guitar, keyboards (2000–2002)
- John Blackburn – bass (2000)
- Jimmy Hogarth – bass (2000)
- Pablo Cook – percussion (1999–2001)
- Luke Bullen – drums (2001–2002)
- Steve "Smiley" Barnard – drums (1999–2000)

== Discography ==
Joe Strummer & the Mescaleros discography
- Studio albums: 3
- Soundtrack albums: 1
- Live albums: 1
- Compilation albums: 4
- Singles: 8
- Music videos: 9

=== Studio albums ===
List of studio albums, with selected details and chart positions
Title	Details	Peak chart positions	
Title	Details	UK	US
Rock Art and the X-Ray Style	Released: 19 October 1999; Label: Mercury (UK), Hellcat (US)	71	—
Global a Go-Go	Released: 24 July 2001; Label: Hellcat	68	—
Streetcore	Released: 21 October 2003; Label: Hellcat	50	160
"—" denotes a recording that did not chart or was not released in that territory.

=== Soundtracks, compilations, box sets and live albums ===
List of albums, with selected details and chart positions
Title	Details	Peak chart positions	
Title	Details	UK	US
Joe Strummer: The Future Is Unwritten	Released: 18 May 2007; Label: Hellcat	—	—
Joe Strummer & the Mescaleros: The Hellcat Years	Released: 21 August 2012; Label: Hellcat	58	—
Live at Acton Town Hall	Released: 23 November 2012; Label: Hellcat	66	—
Joe Strummer 001	Released: 28 September 2018; Label: Ignition	—	—
Assembly	Released: 2 February 2021; Label: BMG	—	—
Joe Strummer 002: The Mescaleros Years	Released: 16 September 2022; Label: BMG	—	—
"—" denotes a recording that did not chart or was not released in that territory.

=== Singles ===
List of singles, with selected chart positions, showing year released and album name
Title	Year	Peak chart positions	Album
Title	Year	UK	Album
"Yalla Yalla"	1999	— (Note: Ineligible to chart.)	Rock Art and the X-Ray Style
"Tony Adams"	1999	—	Rock Art and the X-Ray Style
"Johnny Appleseed"	2001	51	Global a Go-Go
"Coma Girl"	2003	33	Streetcore
"Redemption Song" / "Arms Aloft"	2003	46	Streetcore
"London Is Burning"	2018	—	Joe Strummer 001
"The Road to Rock 'N' Roll" (demo)	2022	—	Joe Strummer 002: The Mescaleros Years
"Fantastic"	2022	—	Joe Strummer 002: The Mescaleros Years
"—" denotes a recording that did not chart or was not released in that territory.

=== Music videos ===
List of music videos, showing year released and directors
Title	Year	Director(s)
"Yalla Yalla"	1999	—N/a
"Tony Adams"	1999	—N/a
"Johnny Appleseed"	2001	—N/a
"Coma Girl"	2003	—N/a
"Redemption Song"	2003	—N/a
"London Is Burning"	2018	Kevin Petillo
"Junco Partner" (acoustic)	2021	Spencer Ramsey
"I Fought the Law" (live)	2021	—N/a
"The Road to Rock 'N' Roll" (demo)	2022	—N/a

DVDs on which Joe Strummer & the Mescaleros appear:

- Joe Strummer: The Future Is Unwritten (2007) – directed by Julien Temple
- Viva Joe Strummer – directed by M. Parkinson
- Let's Rock Again! – directed by Dick Rude
- Later with Jools Holland: Legends
- Hootenanny DVD
- Give 'Em the Boot
- Glastonbury the Movie
- Black Hawk Down
- Le scaphandre et le papillon ("The Diving Bell and the Butterfly") (2007)
