= Walker (soundtrack) =

Soundtrack album by Joe Strummer
- Released: 1987
- Genre: World
- Length: 45:45
- Labels: Virgin, Astralwerks, EMI
- Producer: Joe Strummer

Joe Strummer chronology
Walker (1987)	Earthquake Weather (1989)

Singles from Walker
- 1. "Filibustero (1987)"; 2. "Tennessee Rain (2005)"

Professional ratings
Review scores
Source	Rating
Allmusic	link

Walker is a soundtrack by Joe Strummer, released in 1987. It is the soundtrack to the Alex Cox film of the same name. Originally released on LP, Cassette, and CD in 1987 on the Virgin Movie Music label, the album was released, remastered and with bonus tracks, by Astralwerks in 2005.

== Track listing ==
All tracks written by Joe Strummer. Recorded and mixed by Sam Lehmer at Russian Hill Recording San Francisco.

No.	Title	Length
1.	"Filibustero" (Instrumental)	3:57
2.	"Omotepe" (Instrumental)	3:46
3.	"Sandstorm" (Instrumental)	1:56
4.	"Machete" (Instrumental)	3:04
5.	"Viperland" (Instrumental)	2:40
6.	"Nica Libre" (Instrumental)	3:15
7.	"Latin Romance" (Instrumental)	3:52
8.	"The Unknown Immortal"	3:45
9.	"Musket Waltz" (Instrumental)	2:38
10.	"The Brooding Side of Madness" (Instrumental)	3:02
11.	"Tennessee Rain"	2:54
12.	"Smash Everything" (Instrumental)	3:21
13.	"Tropic of No Return"	3:09
14.	"Tropic of Pico" (Instrumental)	4:26

2005 Rerelease Bonus Tracks
No.	Title	Length
15.	"Straight Shooter" (Instrumental)	1:44
16.	"Brooding Six" (Instrumental)	5:16
17.	"Filibustero (Feestyle Mix)" (Instrumental)	3:50

== Musicians ==
- Joe Strummer – Vocals, producer, string arrangements, horn arrangements
- Zander Schloss – Guitar, charango, vihuela, banjo, guitarron, tambour, guitar arrangements
- Rebeca Mauleón – Piano, organ
- Michael Spiro – Congas, bongos, timbales, percussion
- Rich Girard – Bass
- Richard Zobel – Harmonica, vocal, mandolin, banjo
- Mary Fettig – Tenor & soprano sax, flute
- Dick Bright – Country fiddle, violin
- Michael Hatfield – Marimba, vibes, piano organ
- David Bendigkiet – Trumpet
- John Worley – Trumpet
- Dean Hubbard – Trombone
- John Tenney – Violin
- Dean Franke – Violin
- Susan Chan – Viola
- Stephen Mitchell – Snare drum
- Dan Levin – Fast piano
- Sam Lehmer – Special SFX, bass drum
