= Earthquake Weather (album) =

Studio album by Joe Strummer
- Released: 20 September 1989
- Genre: Rock
- Length: 45:24
- Label: Epic
- Producer: Joe Strummer

Joe Strummer chronology
Walker (1987)	Earthquake Weather (1989)	Rock Art and the X-Ray Style (1999)

Singles from Earthquake Weather
- 1. "Gangsterville"; 2. "Island Hopping"

Professional ratings
Review scores
Source	Rating
AllMusic	3/5 stars
Encyclopedia of Popular Music	3/5 stars
The Great Rock Discography	5/10
MusicHound	2/5
NME	5/10
Punknews.org	3.5/5 stars
Record Mirror	3/5
The Rolling Stone Album Guide	2/5 stars
Uncut	8/10
The Village Voice	C

Earthquake Weather is the first non-soundtrack solo album by former frontman of The Clash, Joe Strummer, released on 20 September 1989. The album was well received by critics, but was not a commercial success. The majority of the album was recorded in Los Angeles, California in 1988 and 1989, as evident from the cover photography and design by Josh Cheuse.

It was the first time Strummer had worked on his own musical project. In previous years he had worked with Alex Cox on the soundtracks of his films Sid and Nancy and Walker in 1986 and 1987. He also worked on the production of his former Clash partner Mick Jones' second album with the band Big Audio Dynamite in 1986.

It was the reception and sales of the music score from the film Walker that got Strummer into the right mental state to start working on his own material again. He got a group together which consisted of Zander Schloss, Lonnie Marshall, Jack Irons and Willie MacNeil. The backing band became known as The Latino Rockabilly War. The first project the band worked on was for the film Permanent Record with Keanu Reeves which featured the songs "Trash City", "Baby the Trans", "Nothin' 'bout Nothin", "Nefertiti Rock", and the haunting instrumental "Theme from Permanent Record".

In 2008 the album was re-released although it was not remastered and the version was very bare bones featuring no liner notes and basically a CD-R version of the album.

== Track listing ==
All tracks are written by Joe Strummer, except where indicated.

No.	Title	Writer(s)	Length
1.	"Gangsterville"		4:20
2.	"King of the Bayou"		2:51
3.	"Island Hopping"		2:36
4.	"Slant Six"		3:04
5.	"Dizzy's Goatee"		3:24
6.	"Shouting Street"		3:19
7.	"Boogie with Your Children"	Strummer, Lonnie Marshall, Zander Schloss	3:30
8.	"Leopardskin Limousines"		3:31
9.	"Sikorsky Parts"		3:35
10.	"Jewellers & Bums"		2:48
11.	"Highway One Zero Street"		3:25
12.	"Ride Your Donkey"	Lloyd Campbell & The Tennors	2:21
13.	"Passport to Detroit"		2:50
14.	"Sleepwalk"		4:06
Total length:			45:24

== Personnel ==
- Joe Strummer - vocals, rhythm guitar, piano, percussion
- Zander Schloss - lead guitar, Spanish guitar, organ, banjo, lyre, vocals
- Lonnie Marshall - bass, piano, percussion, vocals
- Jack Irons - drums (tracks 1, 4, 6, 9, 10, 12)
- Willie McNeil - drums (tracks 2, 3, 5, 7, 8, 11, 13, 14)

with:

- Del Zamora, Dick Rude, Rudy Fernandez - male voice trio

Technical

- Mark Stebbeds - recording, mixing
- Josh Cheuse - cover photography, art direction

== Bibliography ==
- Salewicz, Chris (24 May 2007). Redemption Song: The Ballad of Joe Strummer (1st American ed.). New York: Faber and Faber. ISBN 0-571-21178-X. OCLC 76794852.
