= Dick Rude =

American actor

Dick Rude (born 1964) is a director, actor and writer known for his appearances in and contributions to many Alex Cox films including a starring role in 1986's Straight to Hell, for which he also served as a writer and contributed to the soundtrack. Rude directed the Red Hot Chili Peppers music videos "Catholic School Girls Rule", "Fight Like a Brave", and "Universally Speaking" as well as their live concert DVD Off the Map. He has two young daughters, one named Goldie Greenberg and the other, Maybelline.

His most recent film is Let's Rock Again!, a 2004 documentary that documented the final tour of musician Joe Strummer shortly before his death in 2002.

== Filmography ==
=== Actor ===
- Rock 'n' Roll Hotel (1984)
- Repo Man (1984) - Duke
- The Wild Life (1984) - Eddie
- Night of the Comet (1984) - Stock Boy
- Straight to Hell (1986) - Willy
- Sid and Nancy (1986) - Riker's Guard
- Walker (1987) - Washburn
- Tokyo no kyujitsu (1991) - Johnny Elvis Rotten
- Roadside Prophets (1992) - Two Free Stooges
- Lolamoviola: Dead Souls (1993) - Man
- The GoodTimesKid (2005) - Tough Guy
- Dead Souls (2025) - Doctor Stanton

=== Director ===
- Catholic School Girls Rule (1985) (Red Hot Chili Peppers music video)
- Fight Like a Brave (1987) (Red Hot Chili Peppers music video)
- Off the Map (2001) (Red Hot Chili Peppers live DVD)
- Universally Speaking (2003) (Red Hot Chili Peppers music video)
- Let's Rock Again! (2004) (Joe Strummer documentary)
