= The Minstrel Boy =

1813 Irish patriotic song by Thomas Moore

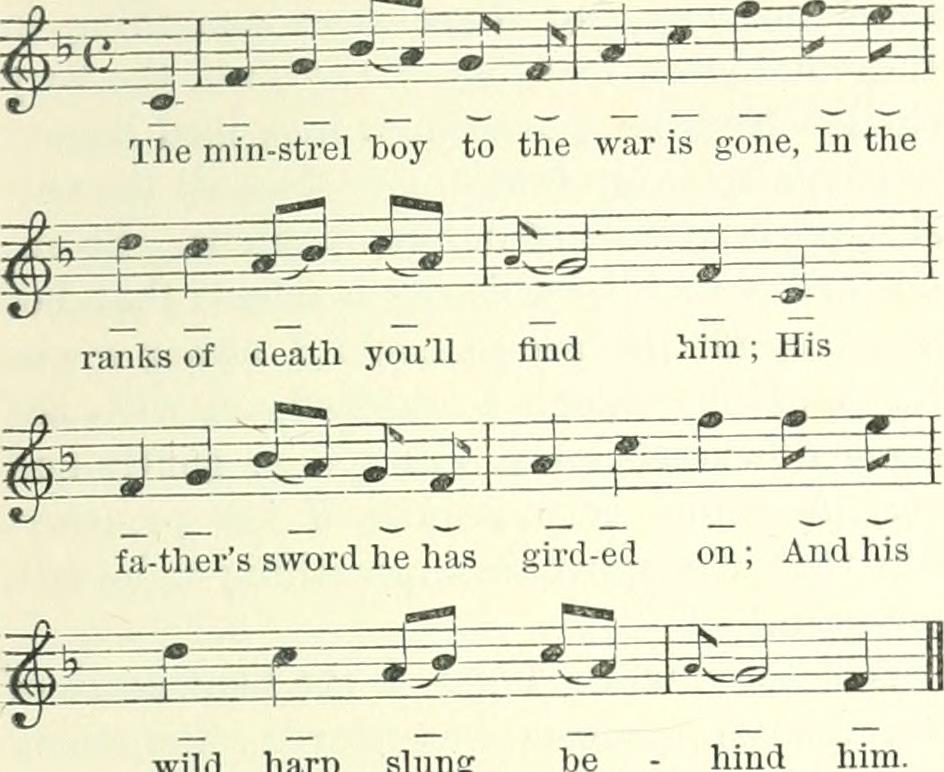
The opening bars of "The Minstrel Boy". By request of Moore to James Power during publication, the harmonized air of the song (as found in the Gibson-Massie collection of the Irish Melodies at Queen's University Belfast) is in the key G major, whilst this, the solo of the song, is (in Moore's words) a "note lower" in F major.

The Minstrel Boy
As played on violin by wikipedian Endersslay

"The Minstrel Boy" is an Irish song written by Irish poet Thomas Moore (1779–1852) and published as part of his Irish Melodies. Moore himself came to be nicknamed "The Minstrel Boy", and indeed it is the title of Leonard Strong's 1937 biography of Moore.

It is Roud Folk Song Index no. 13867.

== Publication, sources and popularity ==
The song was published in 1813 as part of Moore's Irish Melodies project, which spanned the years 1808 to 1834.

The record of the melody to which the song is set, The Moreen, begins in 1813 with Moore's publication of it, which is the sole source of the statement that it is a traditional Irish air. There is no prior record, and no source for it has been firmly traced by the several scholars who have looked into the sources for Moore's work. Charles Villiers Stanford published a "restored" collection of Irish songs in 1895, asserting a source for the tune; but scholars Veronica Ní Chinnéide in the 20th century and Una Hunt in the 21st century think Stanford to have not properly researched things, with corrections to several of his attributions having followed in 1898 in Alfred Moffatt's Minstrelsy of Ireland. Moore, according to Hunt's research, had greater access to manuscripts and to printed sources than previous researchers had believed.

Similarly according to Hunt's research, Aloys Fleischmann mistakenly claimed as sources several works that in fact post-date Moore's own publication. The tune appears in George Thomson's collection of Scottish and Irish airs in 1816, under Moore's title, leading to the suspicion, albeit no documentary evidence for which has been found, that Thomson sent the tune to Moore.

The Irish Melodies were overall immensely popular in Ireland and Great Britain when they were published, reaching a diverse audience, and "The Minstrel Boy" was one of the most famous songs from that collection. After his death, large numbers of special editions of what were later re-titled Moore's Melodies were sold at premium prices, with lavish illustrations, expensive green leather bindings, and embossed images of shamrocks and golden harps. These were also sold in North America, to which Moore's popularity also extended.

== Theme and lyrics ==
Like with several other of the Irish Melodies, "The Minstrel Boy" is melancholy and nostalgic. Its central icon is the image of a harp, which is a romantic symbol for Ireland, torn asunder; but, in contrast to the Irish political songs of some of Moore's contemporaries, with no promise of restoration implied for the future. A "warrior bard" is forced into silence by slavery.

Some of Moore's more subtle expressions of his politics in his songs were lost on early American audiences, who favoured the overt themes of freedom and liberty in "The Minstrel Boy", much in tune with the contemporary romantic notions of democracy that were also popular, and skipped over its references to slavery. Moore himself, who had travelled through the United States and Canada the previous decade, had a low opinion of the slavery still (then) employed in the former, expressing in 1806 his disappointment and his casting aside all "hope for the future energy and greatness of America".

Matthew Campbell, professor of Modern Literature and editor of The Cambridge Companion to Contemporary Irish Poetry (2003), contends that the images of harp, sword, and "Land of song" are "over-egging a double cultural and political symbolism" and that the "histrionic" song's "bathos" contrasts with the "delicacy" of "The Last Rose of Summer". In a contrasting view, George Bernard Shaw called the lyrics "visionary" in his preface to John Bull's Other Island.

The original lyrics are as follows:

I
The Minstrel-Boy to the war is gone,
In the ranks of death you'll find him;
His father's sword he has girded on,
And his wild harp slung behind him.
"Land of song!" said the warrior-bard,
"Tho' all the world betrays thee,
One sword, at least, thy rights shall guard,
One faithful harp shall praise thee!"

II
The Minstrel fell!—but the foeman's chain
Could not bring that proud soul under;
The harp he lov'd ne'er spoke again,
For he tore its chords asunder;
And said, "No chains shall sully thee,
Thou soul of love and bravery!
Thy songs were made for the pure and free,
They shall never sound in slavery."

Rafael María de Mendive translated the whole of the Irish Melodies into Spanish and published them in 1863 in New York as the Melodías irlandesas de Tomás Moore. His translations were informed by his own Cuban nationalism, and "El trovador" (the translation of "The Minstrel Boy") is equally as vehement in tone as Moore's original, translating "proud soul" to "espíritu patriota" (patriotic spirit) and retaining references to "esclavos" (slaves), which was in fact a directly relevant political topic in Cuba, slavery not being abolished there until some two decades later. The last four lines of de Mendive's translation are, for comparison:

¡No mancharán tus cuerdas los esclavos,
Arpa de amor, cuando solemne vibres
Tu acento solo escucharán los bravos
pechos que encierren corazones libres!

A concentrated, single verse version exists:

The minstrel boy to the war is gone,
In the ranks of death ye may find him
His father's sword he hath girded on,
With his wild harp slung along behind him;
Land of Song, the lays of the warrior bard,
May some day sound for thee,
But his harp belongs to the brave and free
And shall never sound in slavery!

During the American Civil War a third verse was written by an unknown author, and is sometimes included in renditions of the song:

The Minstrel Boy will return we pray
When we hear the news we all will cheer it,
The minstrel boy will return one day,
Torn perhaps in body, not in spirit.
Then may he play on his harp in peace,
In a world such as heaven intended,
For all the bitterness of man must cease,
And ev'ry battle must be ended.

== Influences on other works and composers ==
=== Britten ===
Benjamin Britten referenced "The Minstrel Boy" in his opera Owen Wingrave several times, starting with the principal characters Lechmere and Owen not using exactly the original melody, but a slightly distorted version of it, in scene 1. In the analysis of music history professor J. Harper-Scott, Britten's assumption would have been that the opera's audience would either know the theme being referenced, or at least recognize its type.

Lechmere's recital diverges from the original after the first arpeggio and progressively drops in pitch by semitones and tones at various points thereafter, ending a perfect fourth below where the original would have been. Owen's recital is even more divergent, and not only progressively drops in pitch from the original as well to a major third below, but even omits notes. Lechemere uses the original words from Moore's song, given in quotation marks in the score for the opera; but, in contrast, in the final scene of the first act, the character Sir Philip uses the tune and adheres more closely to the original than Owen does, but applies it instead to the final two words of "for right and England".

The tune is also used, distorted, at various other points throughout the opera, including Lechemere's conversation with Kate where he sings "But Kate, does he reject you?" to a less distorted version of the original melody.

=== Stanford and Sousa ===
Charles Villiers Stanford made overt political commentary on contemporary politics in Ireland in his music, including, amongst other places, the quotation of the first verse of "The Minstrel Boy" as preface to his score of his Fourth Irish Rhapsody.

John Philip Sousa, as director of the United States Marine Band, incorporated elements into the "Mother Hubbard March" (1885).

=== Joyce, Yeats, parodies, and burlesque ===
James Joyce parodied the song in Finnegans Wake as "The Leinstrel boy to the wall has gone". In Joyce's Ulysses the character Henry Flower being described as "Steered by his rapier, he glides to the door, his wild harp slung behind him." is in part a direct quotation from the song, alluding to the character (Leopold Bloom under an alias) being like a minstrel who sings of lost loves. Joyce referenced many of Moore's works in his own work, but he also showed them a little disrespect, in which he was not alone; W. B. Yeats did so as well.

William Brough wrote a parody of the lyrics in his 1857 Victorian burlesque Lalla Rookh (named for Moore's Lalla Rookh):

The minstrel boy through the town is known,
In each quiet street you'll find him,
With his master's organ—it is ne'er his own,
And his monkey led behind him.
"Straw laid down!" cries the minstrel boy,
"Some sick man here needs quiet;
'Bobbin around' will this house annoy,
At any rate I'll try it!"

The minstrel grinds, and his victims pay;—
To his claims he's forced compliance!
To the poet's study then he takes his way—
To the men of art and science.
And cries, "My friends, in vain you'd toil
At books, at pen, or easel;
One roving vagabond your work shall spoil,"—
He plays "Pop goes the weasel".

== Notable performances and recordings ==
Over the centuries since publication there have been numerous renditions of the Irish Melodies and of "The Minstrel Boy" in particular. These include, in no particular order, popular recordings and performances by Irish tenor John McCormack, American actor/singer Paul Robeson, Irish folk singer Tom Clancy, Irish singer Shane MacGowan, and British singer Joe Strummer with his band The Mescaleros. Strummer's version was arranged by Hans Zimmer and used in the soundtrack of the movie Black Hawk Down. The others are in various collections of "Irish"/"Favourite" songs by the respective performers.

Other performances of note have been:

- Sir John Pope Hennessy during his time in Hong Kong had the 27th Inniskillings Regiment play "The Minstrel Boy" at formal occasions, including receptions at Government House.
- The song was played at the grand opening of the World Trade Center Memorial on 11 September 2011; the tenth anniversary of the 9/11 attacks.
- The song is featured in the 86th episode of Star Trek: The Next Generation, "The Wounded," and is sung by Miles O'Brien, portrayed by Irish actor Colm Meaney and Bob Gunton, who originated the role of Juan Peron in the original Broadway production of Evita.
- Actors Sean Connery and Michael Caine sing renditions of the song in the 1975 film The Man Who Would Be King.
- Eleanor McEvoy recorded the song on her 2017 album The Thomas Moore Project, a collection of reinterpretations of the songs of Thomas Moore.
