= Tymon Dogg =

English musician (born 1950)

- Also known as: Timon, Step Murray
- Born: Stephen Murray; 1950 (age 75–76); Formby, Lancashire, England
- Origin: London, England
- Genres: Folk; punk; world
- Instruments: Violin; guitar; piano; harmonium; viola; shawm
- Years active: 1967–present
- Website: tymondogg.com

Tymon Dogg (born Stephen John Murray) is an English singer-songwriter and multi-instrumentalist. Dogg's career started early with shows at the Cavern and Peppermint Lounge in Liverpool when he was 15. As well as pursuing a solo career, he collaborated with many bands and musicians including The Clash, and was a member of Joe Strummer's last band, The Mescaleros.

== Career ==
Dogg moved to London at 17, signed to Pye Records (under the name Timon) and recorded a single, "The Bitter Thoughts of Little Jane" featuring then-session musicians Jimmy Page and John Paul Jones. Moving to Apple Records, Dogg recorded tracks produced by Peter Asher featuring Paul McCartney on piano and James Taylor on guitar. Dogg then toured with The Moody Blues and worked closely with Justin Hayward to produce many tracks, "Now She Says She's Young" being released as a single in 1970.

Dogg became part of London's early 1970s underground scene. Moving into a squatted property in Westbourne Grove, Dogg made a living playing in folk clubs and busking with house mate Joe Strummer. Dogg regularly played at the Charlie Pig Dog Club with the 101ers and when Joe Strummer joined The Clash, Dogg was invited to contribute tracks on Sandinista! and Combat Rock.

Other notable housemates from that time included all female punk band The Slits. In 1978, Dogg moved to the North East of England with artist Helen Cherry. Dogg released Battle of Wills during the 1980s. In 2000, Dogg met up with Joe Strummer again at the Poetry Olympics curated by Michael Horovitz. The two performed an impromptu set of songs together, with Lily Allen in her début stage performance as backing singer.

Shortly afterwards, Dogg joined Strummer's band, The Mescaleros, and the two worked together until Strummer's death in 2002 producing songs such as "Mondo Bongo" and "Johnny Appleseed". Dogg has continued to write and record his music. In 2010 Rev-Ola Records released a compilation of songs from 1967 to 2009 called The Irrepressible Tymon Dogg and Thin Man Press produced a CD of Dogg's soundscape settings of extracts from Louis Aragon's A Wave of Dreams in 2012.

== Discography ==
=== Solo recordings ===
Year	Album
1976	Tymon Dogg
1982	Battle of Wills
1987	Frugivores – New Age Songs
1989	Relentless
2007	(EP) Guantanamo
2010	A Wave of Dreams
2010	The Irrepressible Tymon Dogg
2015	Made of Light

=== With Joe Strummer and The Mescaleros ===
Year	Album	Artist	Credit
2001	Global a Go-Go	Joe Strummer and The Mescaleros	Composed tune and played Spanish guitar on "Mondo Bongo"; composed & played violin improvisation on "Minstrel Boy"; violin, mandolin, Spanish guitar, acoustic & electric guitar on most tracks.
2002	Give 'Em the Boot III	Various artists	Violin, Spanish guitar on Joe Strummer & The Mescaleros' "Global A Go-Go"
2003	Streetcore	Joe Strummer and The Mescaleros	Violin on "Silver and Gold"
2004	Give 'Em the Boot IV	Various artists	Violin on Joe Strummer & The Mescaleros "Junco Pardner"

=== Guest appearances ===
Year	Album	Artist	Credit
1980	Sandinista!	The Clash	Composed music & lyrics, sang & played violin on "Lose This Skin"; composed & played violin part on "The Equaliser"; played violin on "Lightning Strikes (Not Once But Twice)" & "Something About England"; played harmonium on "Sound of the Sinners".
1981	Short Back 'n' Sides	Ian Hunter	Violin on "Old Records Never Die"
1981	Spirit of St. Louis	Ellen Foley	Wrote tunes & lyrics, played violin on: "Beautiful Waste of Time," "Game of a Man" and "Indestructible"
1982	Combat Rock	The Clash	Composed & played piano part on "Death Is A Star". Composed & sang out-take track "Once You Know" backed by all members of The Clash
1985	The Price of Grain	Poison Girls	Violin on "The Price of Grain and the Price of Blood" and "Stonehenge 1985"
1995	The Bitter Lie	Doctor Millar	Producer
1998	De Granada a la Luna	Various artists	Violin and guest vocals on "Casida Del Herido Por El Agua" with Lagartija Nick
2000	Once Bitten Twice Shy	Ian Hunter	Violin on "Old Records Never Die"
2007/2008	Screamin	El Doghouse	Violin on "Screamin' Bloody Murder"
2008	Howl	El Doghouse	Violin on "Screamin' Bloody Murder"
2009	This Is Only Me	Jonathan Martin	Production, Violin on Single "This Is Only Me"
2013	Forgive And Forget	Susannah Austin	Producer, composed & performed all instrumental parts except ukulele on "Come Have a Drink".
