= Black Hawk Down (soundtrack) =

Black Hawk Down: Original Motion Picture Soundtrack

Film score by Hans Zimmer
- Released: January 15, 2002
- Studios: Media Ventures, Santa Monica, California; Sony Scoring Stage, Culver City, California
- Length: 66:54
- Labels: Decca, UMG Soundtracks
- Producers: Hans Zimmer, Pietro Scalia, Bob Badami

Professional ratings
Review scores
Source	Rating
SoundtrackNet	3/5 stars
Filmtracks	3/5 stars

Black Hawk Down is the soundtrack accompanying the 2001 film of the same name. The original score was composed and arranged by Hans Zimmer. The music was written in collaboration with several other musicians (including Martin Tillmann, Craig Eastman, Michael Brook, Heitor Pereira and Mel Wesson) in what was referred to as "The War Room" at the Media Ventures studios. Based on jam sessions that were later edited to match the pictures, the score was produced within a few weeks. Because the end result was very experimental, Zimmer was afraid there would not be much music suitable for a listening experience on compact disc. The soundtrack disc was released on January 15, 2002.

== Overview ==
To prepare for the film, composer Hans Zimmer sent then-assistant Marc Streitenfeld to scout various instruments and sounds native to the deserts of Africa. Additionally, several musicians from around the world worked with Zimmer to develop the soundtrack. Among these musicians was Senegalese vocalist Baaba Maal, whose typically positive sound was used in contrast with the film's content, and Denez Prigent, a Breton singer interpreting Gortoz a ran ("I await") with Lisa Gerrard. The score occasionally makes use of the wailing woman technique.

== Track listing ==
No.	Title	Length
1.	"Hunger"	6:35
2.	"Barra Barra" (Performed by Rachid Taha)	5:47
3.	"Vale of Plenty"	2:27
4.	"Chant"	2:33
5.	"Still"	4:48
6.	"Mogadishu Blues"	2:53
7.	"Synchrotone"	8:55
8.	"Bakara"	3:12
9.	"Of the Earth"	2:19
10.	"Ashes to Ashes"	4:43
11.	"Gortoz a ran (Breton) - J'Attends (French)" (Composed and performed by Lisa Gerrard / Denez Prigent)	5:51
12.	"Tribal War"	2:39
13.	"Leave No Man Behind"	6:18
14.	"Minstrel Boy (Film Version)" (Performed by Joe Strummer and the Mescaleros)	5:42
15.	"Still Reprise"	2:12
Total length:		66:54
