= Scott Shields (musician) =

Scottish musician (born 1969)

Scott Shields (born 26 November 1969 in Glasgow) is a Scottish film composer, musician and record producer, best known as a member of Joe Strummer's band The Mescaleros.

== Biography ==
Shields' first band was Gun, in which he was the drummer. Following the departure of Baby Stafford, Shields joined up with his former bandmate as drummer and producer for Stafford's new band. In the mid-1990s, after moving to London to play with Shakespears Sister, Shields formed 'Bond' with Jimmy Hogarth and Steve Eusebe, later bringing onboard Martin Slattery of Black Grape. In early 1999 he joined Joe Strummer & The Mescaleros with Slattery, originally on bass and later as a guitarist. Shields was with The Mescaleros until Joe Strummer's death in December 2002. He co-wrote numerous songs on Global a Go-Go and Streetcore. Shields also co-produced both albums with Martin Slattery, before going on to produce albums for Paul Heaton (The Beautiful South), The Miniatures and The Marble Index.

He has more recently become known as a composer of music for film and television with his work being seen on many films such as Black Hawk Down, Mr. & Mrs. Smith, Stardust, The Young Victoria, Kick-Ass and The Raven. His TV work includes HBO series Strike Back as well as Waking the Dead, The Fixer, Trial and Retribution and Murphy's Law.

== Film scores ==
Shields has produced and written tracks and scores for numerous films, including Mike Bassett: England Manager, Bend It Like Beckham, Mr. & Mrs. Smith, Black Hawk Down, Hannibal Rising, Gypsy Woman, Straightheads and Stardust.
