= Redemption Song =

1980 single by Bob Marley

Single by Bob Marley and the Wailers

from the album Uprising
- B-side: "Redemption Song" (Band version); "I Shot the Sheriff" (Live)
- Released: 7 October 1980
- Genre: Folk
- Length: 3:49
- Label: Island
- Songwriter: Bob Marley
- Producers: Bob Marley, Chris Blackwell

Bob Marley and the Wailers singles chronology
"Three Little Birds" (1980)	"Redemption Song" (1980)	"Reggae on Broadway" (1981)

Music video
- "Redemption Song" on YouTube

"Redemption Song" is a song by Jamaican singer Bob Marley. It is the final track on Bob Marley and the Wailers' twelfth album, Uprising, produced by Chris Blackwell and released by Island Records. The song is considered one of Marley's greatest works. Some key lyrics derived from a speech given by the Pan-Africanist orator Marcus Garvey titled "The Work That Has Been Done", which Marley publicly recited as early as July 1979 during his appearance at the Amandla Festival.

Unlike most of Bob Marley's other tracks, it is strictly a solo acoustic recording, consisting of his singing and playing an acoustic guitar, without accompaniment. The song is in the key of G major.

== History ==
The song is reported to have been written around 1979, appearing for the first time on a demo tape called "Dada Demos" which, amongst other unreleased tracks and re-recordings of older songs, features an early version of "Could You Be Loved?" with drum machine accompaniment. German journalist Teja Schwaner claims to have witnessed Marley playing Redemption Song during a hotel stay in Hamburg on tour in 1976, although he could have confused it with another song.

A few years earlier, Bob Marley had been diagnosed with the cancer in his toe that took his life in 1981. According to Rita Marley, "...he was already secretly in a lot of pain and dealt with his own mortality, a feature that is clearly apparent in the album, particularly in this song."

After its recording for the Uprising album, the song saw its first public performance during the opener show of the Uprising Tour on May 30, 1980, in Zürich, Switzerland, and continued to be featured in every known setlist of that tour's further concerts. There exist at least two music video recordings of the song, one produced by the Jamaica Broadcasting Corporation, featuring Marley and his keyboardist Earl Lindo both accompanying themselves on guitars, and a second one from September 1980 featuring Marley during a rehearsal break and his band members listening. A few more recordings from live concerts exist, both audio and video, amongst them a performance from Dortmund, Germany, on June 13, 1980, which is featured on the official 2014 release Uprising Live.

"Redemption Song" was released as a single in the UK and France in October 1980 and included a full band rendering of the song. This version has since been included as a bonus track on the 2001 reissue of Uprising, as well as on the 2001 compilation One Love: The Very Best of Bob Marley & The Wailers. Although in live performances the full band was used for the song, the solo recorded performance remains the take most familiar to listeners.

In 2004, Rolling Stone placed the song at number 66 among "The 500 Greatest Songs of All Time." An updated list was published on Feb 16, 2024, where the song was placed at number 42.

In 2010, the New Statesman listed it as one of the Top 20 Political Songs.

On 5 February 2020 (on the eve of what would have been his 75th birthday), Marley's estate released an official animated video for the song. This also commemorated the 40th anniversary of the song's release.

The song was reissued on clear 12" vinyl for Record Store Day in 2020.

== Personnel ==
Bob Marley – vocals, acoustic guitar, production

With Bob accompanying himself on guitar, "Redemption Song" was unlike anything he had ever recorded: an acoustic ballad, without any hint of reggae rhythm. In message and sound it recalled Bob Dylan. Biographer Timothy White called it an 'acoustic spiritual' and another biographer, Stephen Davis, pointed out the song was a 'total departure', a deeply personal verse sung to the bright-sounding acoustic strumming of Bob's Ovation Adamas guitar.

— James Henke, author of Marley Legend

== Meaning and influence ==
The song urges listeners to "Emancipate yourself from mental slavery," because "None but ourselves can free our minds." These lines were taken from a speech given by Marcus Garvey at Menelik Hall in Sydney, Nova Scotia (Canada), during October 1937 and published in his Black Man magazine:

We are going to emancipate ourselves from mental slavery because whilst others might free the body, none but ourselves can free the mind. Mind is your only ruler, sovereign. The man who is not able to develop and use his mind is bound to be the slave of the other man who uses his mind ...

In 2009, Jamaican poet and broadcaster Mutabaruka chose "Redemption Song" as the most influential recording in Jamaican music history.

In 2017, "Redemption Song" was featured in series 25 of BBC Radio 4's Soul Music, a documentary series exploring famous pieces of music and their emotional appeal, with contributors including Marley's art director Neville Garrick, Jamaican Poet Laureate Lorna Goodison, Grammy Award-winning artist John Legend, and Wailers guitarist Don Kinsey.

In American Songwriter's 2019 appreciation of the song, Jim Beviglia analyzed the song as being a "departure" from his regular music:

Marley was too much a force of nature to lose his personality just because he was in a new setting. The rhythmic ingenuity that marked his career can be heard in the little instrumental breakdown between verses. His vocal also drips with idiosyncratic power, from the way he hiccups his way through some of the lines to give them some extra flavor to his brilliant phrasing of the word “triumphantly.” Other songwriters might have crammed in a few other words just to fit the meter a bit more snugly, but Marley’s choice gives that word added meaning.

== Certifications ==
Region	Certification	Certified units/sales
Brazil (Pro-Música Brasil)	Gold	30,000^{‡}
Italy (FIMI)	Gold	25,000^{‡}
New Zealand (RMNZ)	2× Platinum	60,000^{‡}
Spain (Promusicae)	Gold	30,000^{‡}
United Kingdom (BPI)	Gold	400,000^{‡}
^{‡} Sales+streaming figures based on certification alone.

== Covers ==
Manfred Mann's Earth Band recorded a version of the song for the album Somewhere in Afrika in 1983.

Stevie Wonder recorded a cover version in 1996, which was released on the soundtrack album Get on the Bus (soundtrack) and his 1996 compilation album Song Review: A Greatest Hits Collection.

Moodswings do a medley of "Redemption Song" & "Oh Happy Day" on their 1997 album Psychedelicatessen with vocals by Tanita Tikaram.

Joe Strummer of the Clash recorded a cover version that was released posthumously on the album Streetcore in 2003, which featured his backing band at the time, the Mescaleros. Strummer also covered the song as a duet with Johnny Cash during the latter's sessions for the American IV: The Man Comes Around album, this version being released later in the box set Unearthed.

Remedy Drive released a cover of the song, on their 2018 studio album The North Star.
