= Permanent Record (film) =

1988 film by Marisa Silver

- Theatrical release poster
- Directed by: Marisa Silver
- Written by: Jarre Fees; Larry Ketron; Alice Liddle
- Produced by: Frank Mancuso, Jr.
- Starring: Pamela Gidley; Michelle Meyrink; Keanu Reeves; Jennifer Rubin
- Cinematography: Frederick Elmes
- Edited by: Robert Brown
- Music by: Joe Strummer
- Distributed by: Paramount Pictures
- Release date: April 22, 1988
- Running time: 92 minutes
- Country: United States
- Language: English
- Budget: $8 million
- Box office: $1 million

Permanent Record is a 1988 American drama film starring Pamela Gidley, Michelle Meyrink, Keanu Reeves, Jennifer Rubin, and Alan Boyce. It was filmed on location in Portland, Oregon and Yaquina Head near Newport on the Oregon Coast. The film primarily deals with the profound effect of suicide, and how friends and family work their way through the grief.

== Plot ==
David Sinclair (Alan Boyce) seems to have everything. He is smart, talented, funny, and popular. He is best friends with Chris Townsend (Keanu Reeves), a quirky outsider. He seems to have it all together, yet as his personal academic expectations and those of his parents become overwhelming, he seemingly is keeping emotional problems a secret to himself.

At a party with his school friends along the coast, he takes a walk to the edge of a cliff overlooking the ocean.

Chris, playful as ever, decides to sneak up on his friend, but when he emerges from behind a rock, David is not there. He has fallen to his death. Originally assumed to be a horrible accident, the situation changes when Chris receives a suicide note in the mail. Chris and David's girlfriend, Lauren (Jennifer Rubin), want to hold some type of memorial, but a reluctant school decides against it, leaving the kids to memorialize their friend in their own way.

== Cast ==
- Keanu Reeves as Chris Townsend
- Alan Boyce as David Sinclair
- Michelle Meyrink as M.G.
- Jennifer Rubin as Lauren
- Barry Corbin as Jim Sinclair
- Kathy Baker as Martha Sinclair
- Pamela Gidley as Kim
- Richard Bradford as Leo Verdell, Principal
- Michael Elgart as Jake
- Dakin Matthews as Mr. McBain, Drama Teacher
- Lou Reed as himself
- Sam Vlahos as Mr. Townsend
- David Selberg as Dr. Moss, School Superintendent
- Ron Jaxon as Woody
- Kevin Brown as Tiny
- Paul Ganus as Randy
- Phil Diskin as Security Guard
- Garrett Lambert as Producer
- Carolyn Tomei as Chemistry Teacher

== Reception ==
Permanent Record received mixed reviews from critics upon its release. The film holds a 47% rating on Rotten Tomatoes based on 15 reviews.

Roger Ebert of the Chicago Sun-Times praised the film as one of the best 1988 had to offer, stating all the performances were appropriate to the material, while also praising Silver for finding authentic ways to portray emotions.

Variety Reviews applauded Reeves' performance in the latter half of the film, citing Boyce's character's suicide as the primary reason, although also criticizing the female characters in the film.

Rob Gonsalves of efilmcritic.com criticized the film, stating it was nothing more than a 'TV-Movie drama film,' while also criticizing the climax of the story. However, he also praised the performance of Keanu Reeves.

== Soundtrack ==
The musical score for Permanent Record was composed by Joe Strummer, former member of the punk rock band The Clash. A soundtrack album was released in 1988 and featured five songs by Joe Strummer and the Latino Rockabilly War with Keanu Reeves guest starring on rhythm guitar for the album's opening track, as well as individual tracks by Lou Reed, The Stranglers, BoDeans, The Godfathers, and JD Souther.

No.	Title	Writer(s)	Recording artist(s)	Length
1.	"Trash City"	Joe Strummer	Joe Strummer, The Latino Rockabilly War & Keanu Reeves	4:12
2.	"Baby the Trans"	Joe Strummer	Joe Strummer & The Latino Rockabilly War	2:19
3.	"Nefertiti"	Joe Strummer	Joe Strummer & The Latino Rockabilly War	2:11
4.	"Nothin' Bout Nothin'"	Joe Strummer	Joe Strummer & The Latino Rockabilly War	2:31
5.	"Theme From Permanent Record - Instrumental Score"	Joe Strummer	Joe Strummer	3:20
6.	"'Cause I Said So"	The Godfathers	The Godfathers	2:46
7.	"Waiting on Love"	Kurt Neumann, Sam Llanas	BoDeans	3:52
8.	"Wishing on Another Lucky Star"	JD Souther	JD Souther	3:45
9.	"All Day and All of the Night"	Dave Davies, Ray Davies	The Stranglers	2:30
10.	"Something Happened"	Lou Reed	Lou Reed	4:00
