= Martin Slattery =

British multi-instrumentalist

Martin Paul Slattery (born 30 December 1973 in Blackburn) is an English multi-instrumentalist and composer.

He plays electric guitar, acoustic guitar, keyboards, saxophone, and flute.

Slattery was first a member of Joe Strummer's backing band The Mescaleros.

He was in the band The Hours alongside Antony Genn from 2004 until 2007. He has worked with a number of artists since then, as vocalist, multi-instrumentalist and composer.
