= Lovedolls Superstar (soundtrack) =

Soundtrack album by Various Artists
- Released: 1986
- Length: 23 at 54:55
- Label: SST (062)

Various Artists chronology
Desperate Teenage Lovedolls Soundtrack (1984)	Lovedolls Superstar (1986)

Professional ratings
Review scores
Source	Rating
Allmusic	2.5/5 stars

Lovedolls Superstar is a soundtrack album to accompany the film of the same name by Dave Markey. Music Score by Jeff McDonald, Abby Travis, Kristian Hoffman, Mario Lalli, Paul Roessler, Andrew Weiss, & Sim Cain Featuring Music by Redd Kross, Sonic Youth, Meat Puppets, Dead Kennedys, Painted Willie, Swa, Lawndale, Annette Zilinskas, Anarchy 6, & The Lovedolls

Soundtrack originally released on SST Records.

A different version of the soundtrack was made available for free download on Dave Markey's We Got Power Films web site.

== Track listing ==
1. Redd Kross - "Lovedoll Superstar" (Jeff McDonald) - 2:47
2. The Lovedolls - "Beer & Ludes" (Jeff McDonald) - 5:54
3. The Lovedolls - "Rex Smith 9 (I Wanna Be a Cholo Chick)" (Jeff McDonald) - 3:09
4. The Lovedolls - "Now That I've Tasted Blood" (K. Pilkington) - 3:15
5. The Lovedolls - "Sunshine Day" (K. Pilkington) - 2:36
6. Black Flag - "Kickin' & Stickin'" (Greg Ginn/Henry Rollins) - 1:24
7. Redd Kross - "Purple Haze" (Jimi Hendrix) - 2:51
8. Annette - "Baby Don't Go" (Sonny Bono) - 3:22
9. Gone - "Slick's Thang" (Gone) - 2:02
10. The Lovedolls - "The Love Machine" (Chuck Dukowski/Greg Ginn/Jordan Schwartz) - 2:32
11. Sonic Youth - "Hallowed Be Thy Name" (Neal "Nervous" Smith) - 2:36
12. Painted Willie - "Darling Shelah" (P. Rince) - 2:37
13. Lawndale - "Wingtips" (Rick Lawndale) - 2:01
14. Gone - "Lord of the Wasteland" (Gone) - 1:07
15. Anarchy 6 - "Slam, Spit, Cut Your Hair, Kill Your Mom!" (Dave Markey/Steven Shane McDonald) - 1:05
16. Gone - "Goodbye Forever" (Gone) - 1:48
17. Meat Puppets - "No Values" (Greg Ginn) - 1:37
18. Gone - "Atomic Jam" (Gone) - 2:26
19. Dead Kennedys - "One-Way Ticket to Pluto" (Jello Biafra/Dead Kennedys) - 1:42
20. Gone - "I Won't Stick Any of You Unless and Until I Can Stick All of You" (Greg Ginn) - 2:09
21. Gone - "March" (Gone) - 1:19
22. Gone - "Material Jam" (Gone) - 2:48
23. Gone - "A Day in India (On Acid)" (Gone) - 1:47

== See also ==
- Desperate Teenage Lovedolls
- Desperate Teenage Lovedolls (soundtrack)
- Lovedolls Superstar (film)
