= Neurotica (album) =

Studio album by Redd Kross
- Released: April 1987
- Studio: American Recorders
- Genres: Garage rock; power pop; punk rock; art rock
- Label: Big Time
- Producer: Tommy Erdelyi

Redd Kross chronology
Teen Babes from Monsanto (1984)	Neurotica (1987)	Third Eye (1990)

Alternate cover art
- 2002 reissue

Professional ratings
Review scores
Source	Rating
AllMusic	4.5/5 stars
Pitchfork	9.0/10

Neurotica is the fourth record and second LP from the band Redd Kross. It was released on Big Time Records (an RCA Records subsidiary) in April 1987. Observed to be a blend of various genres including garage rock, power pop, punk rock, art rock and pop rock, the album was influential to the grunge movement.

== Background and recording ==
The album was recorded at American Recorders in Los Angeles, California, and produced by former Ramones drummer Tommy Erdelyi.

== Promotion and releases ==
To promote the album, Big Time Records issued a promotional-only double album titled Dinner with Redd Kross. The first disc featured an interview with the band conducted by Albert O of WBCN-FM, alongside the album versions of "Peach Kelli Pop", "Love Is You", "Neurotica", "Janus, Jeanie, and George Harrison", "McKenzie", and "Play My Song". The second disc contained a remix of "Play My Song" by Michael Frondelli, pressed on red vinyl. This Frondelli remix was subsequently included on The Big Time Syndrome compilation.

A 2002 reissue on Five Foot Two Records included two bonus tracks: Robert Hecker's "Pink Piece of Peace" and Sonny Bono's "It's the Little Things". A different version of "Pink Piece of Peace" appears on the debut album by It's OK!, featuring Redd Kross members Robert Hecker and Victor Indrizzo. Additionally, Steven McDonald and Jon Auer remixed several tracks for the 2002 reissue.

== Songs ==
"McKenzie" is about Mackenzie Phillips. "Love Is You" appeared in the 1987 film The Allnighter and the 2011 film Losers Take All.

== Track listing ==
All songs written by Jeff McDonald, except where noted.

1. "Neurotica" (Steven Shane McDonald, Robert Hecker, J. McDonald) – 2:57
2. "Play My Song" – 3:37
3. "Frosted Flake" (S. McDonald, J. McDonald) – 2:05
4. "Janus, Jeanie, and George Harrison" – 3:13
5. "Love is You" (R. Hecker) – 2:31
6. "Peach Kelli Pop" – 3:36
7. "McKenzie" – 4:28
8. "Tatum O' Tot and the Fried Vegetables" – 1:27 (CD bonus track)
9. "Ballad of a Love Doll" – 1:55 (from the Desperate Teenage Lovedolls soundtrack)
10. "What They Say" (R. Hecker) – 3:59
11. "Gandhi Is Dead (I'm the Cartoon Man)" – 3:25
12. "Beautiful Bye-Byes" (R. Hecker, J. McDonald, S. McDonald) – 1:48
13. "Pink Piece of Peace" (R. Hecker) – 1:38 (bonus track on 2002 CD version)
14. "It's the Little Things" (Sonny Bono) – 3:53 (bonus track on 2002 CD version)

== Personnel ==
- Roy McDonald – drums
- Steven Shane McDonald – bass, vocals
- Robert Hecker – guitar, vocals
- Jeff McDonald – vocals, guitar
