= Beach Blvd =

Compilation album by various artists
- Released: Summer 1979
- Recorded: November 1978 – July 1979
- Studio: Media Art
- Genre: Punk rock; hardcore punk
- Length: 31:39
- Language: English
- Label: Posh Boy
- Producer: Robbie Fields

Beach Blvd is a seminal compilation album featuring early Californian punk rock bands.

== Overview ==
An influential sampler LP, Beach Blvd helped to usher in the hardcore punk movement in suburban Southern California, (Note: "The Beach Boulevard compilation came out ... just as the suburban hardcore attitude was beginning to kick in ... it sort of documented the rise of suburban punk." – Rik L Rik) aided by DJ Rodney Bingenheimer, who gave the record its first airplay on his weekly radio show.

Conceived by the controversial Robbie "Posh Boy" Fields, (Note: The American-born, British educated Robbie Fields, a former aspiring journalist, was the founder of Posh Boy Records.) the album gathers three acts with quite different musical styles: the Crowd from Huntington Beach, Rik L Rik from West Covina, and the Simpletones from Rosemead.

The record title advertised the music's suburban origins: California State Route 39, named Beach Boulevard in the stretch that crosses Orange County, ran inland from the Crowd's hometown to Rik L Rik's.

== Production ==
Produced by Fields, all songs on Beach Blvd were recorded and mixed between November 1978 and July 1979 at Media Art Studio in Hermosa Beach, California.

The tracks credited to Rik L Rik, are remixes (Note: Done at Media Art Studio in Hermosa Beach, California.) of five demo songs recorded in November 1978 by the third lineup of San Francisco punk rock band Negative Trend, where he was lead singer. These versions feature bass overdubs by Jay Lansford, who also added a new guitar track on "Atomic Lawn".

Beach Blvd was mastered by Lanky Linstrot at Wally Heider's Mobile Recording Truck, based in Hollywood, California.

== Release ==
Only three songs featured on Beach Blvd were previously released: Simpletones' "California" was the lead tune on their eponymous 7-inch single record (Note: Posh Boy #PBS 3) from early 1979; while "Meat House" and "I Got Power" were issued as a Rik L Rik 7-inch single (Note: Posh Boy #PBS 4) in mid-1979.

Accompanied by liner notes provided by Bingenheimer, Beach Blvd was originally released in the summer of 1979 on Posh Boy Records, in 12-inch LP format. (Note: Posh Boy #PBS 102) The album was also the Crowd's recorded debut.

== Reissues ==
In 1981, Posh Boy Records issued a rare edition of Beach Blvd on cassette tape, (Note: Posh Boy #PBC 102) which included, as bonus tracks, the entire Red Cross EP (Note: Posh Boy #PBS 1010) by Redd Kross from Hawthorne, California.

The original release on 12-inch vinyl disc was repressed in 1986.

In 1990, Posh Boy issued a 29-track extended version on CD (Note: Posh Boy #PBCD 88102-2) featuring liner notes by Fields and Tony Cadena. Bonus tracks included almost half of Like It or Not Live!, (Note: Posh Boy #PBS 101) the only album by Rik L Rik's first band, the short-lived West Covina four-piece F-Word!, recorded live at San Francisco's Mabuhay Gardens in the spring of 1978 and released posthumously that same year. The 1990 CD edition also added six more Simpletones songs: "I Like Drugs", the B-side of the single "California" from 1979; "TV Love" from Rodney on the ROQ, (Note: Posh Boy #PBS 106) the first of Bingenheimer's compilations, originally issued in 1980; "Disco Ape" (a.k.a. "You Drive Me (Disco) Ape"), an unreleased Lansford arrangement of the Dickies' "You Drive Me Ape (You Big Gorilla)" from 1978; and tracks 13, 15 and 17, all released for the first time. The 1990 edition closed with three additional cuts by the Crowd: "Right Time", also taken from Rodney on the ROQ, "Desmond and Kathy", and an instrumental rendition of the Archies' "Melody Hill" from 1969, both taken from band's first studio album, A World Apart (Note: Posh Boy #PBS 108) from 1981.

In 1991, the original compilation was included in Richard Elerick's numbered 3-LP box set History of Rik L Rik, (Note: Posh Boy #PBS 88101-1) in conjunction with F-Word!'s album Like It or Not Live! and Rik L Rik's The Lost Album (Note: Posh Boy #PBS 119) from 1991.

In 2004, under license from Posh Boy, the Italian label Get Back re-released the 1979 12-inch LP. (Note: Get Back #GET 114)

The following year, Get Back released a 24-song Digipak CD edition, an abridged version of the 1990 edition.

== Track listings ==
=== 1979 LP release ===
Side A
No.	Title	Writer(s)	Artist	Length
1.	"Kirsty Q"	Jay Lansford	Simpletones	2:50
2.	"I Have a Date"	Lansford, Richard W. Scott	Simpletones	2:29
3.	"Tiger Beat Twist"	Lansford, Eric Kiertzner, David Perry	Simpletones	2:02
4.	"Black and Red"	Craig Gray	Rik L Rik	3:56
5.	"Meat House"	Will Shatter, Craig Gray	Rik L Rik	2:44
6.	"Suzy Is a Surf Rocker"	The Crowd	The Crowd	1:21
7.	"Living in Madrid"	The Crowd	The Crowd	1:20
8.	"Trix Are for Kids"	The Crowd	The Crowd	0:51

Side B
No.	Title	Writer(s)	Artist	Length
1.	"Modern Machine"	The Crowd	The Crowd	1:29
2.	"New Crew"	The Crowd	The Crowd	1:16
3.	"I Got Power"	Rik L Rik, Craig Gray	Rik L Rik	1:31
4.	"Mercenaries"	Shatter, Gray	Rik L Rik	2:36
5.	"Atomic Lawn"	L Rik, Gray	Rik L Rik	2:07
6.	"Don't Bother Me"	Lansford	Simpletones	2:16
7.	"California"	Lansford	Simpletones	2:51
Total length:				31:39

=== 1981 MC edition ===
Side A
No.	Title	Artist	Length
1.	"Kirsty Q"	Simpletones	2:50
2.	"I Have a Date"	Simpletones	2:29
3.	"Tiger Beat Twist"	Simpletones	2:02
4.	"Black and Red"	Rik L Rik	3:56
5.	"Meat House"	Rik L Rik	2:44
6.	"I Got Power"	Rik L Rik	1:31
7.	"Mercenaries"	Rik L Rik	2:36
8.	"Atomic Lawn"	Rik L Rik	2:07

Side B
No.	Title	Writer(s)	Artist	Length
1.	"Suzy Is a Surf Rocker"		The Crowd	1:21
2.	"Living in Madrid"		The Crowd	1:20
3.	"Trix Are for Kids"		The Crowd	0:51
4.	"Modern Machine"		The Crowd	1:29
5.	"New Crew"		The Crowd	1:16
6.	"Cover Band"	Greg Hetson	Red Cross	1:25
7.	"Annette's Got the Hits"	S. McDonald, J. McDonald	Red Cross	1:08
8.	"I Hate My School"	J. McDonald	Red Cross	0:57
9.	"Clorox Girls"	S. McDonald, J. McDonald	Red Cross	0:58
10.	"S & M Party"	Hetson, J. McDonald	Red Cross	0:56
11.	"Standing in Front of Poseur"	J. McDonald	Red Cross	0:58
12.	"Don't Bother Me"		Simpletones	2:16
13.	"California"		Simpletones	2:51
Total length:				38:01

=== 1990 CD edition ===
No.	Title	Writer(s)	Artist	Length
1.	"Introduction" (live spoken language)		Dirk Dirksen (emcee)	1:00
2.	"Do the Nihil" (live)	Rick L Rick, Dim Wanker	F-Word!	1:55
3.	"Out There" (live)	L Rick, Wanker	F-Word!	1:42
4.	"In the Haze" (live)	L Rick	F-Word!	2:11
5.	"Government Official" (live)	L Rick, Wanker	F-Word!	2:37
6.	"Shut Down" (Germs live cover)	Darby Crash	F-Word!	3:39
7.	"Kirsty Q"		Simpletones	2:50
8.	"I Have a Date"		Simpletones	2:29
9.	"Tiger Beat Twist"		Simpletones	2:02
10.	"Don't Bother Me"		Simpletones	2:16
11.	"California"		Simpletones	2:51
12.	"I Like Drugs"	Jay Lansford, Jerry Koskie	Simpletones	2:10
13.	"Dead Meat (Killer Smog)"	Lansford, Koskie	Simpletones	2:23
14.	"TV Love"	Lansford	Simpletones	1:34
15.	"Rock 'n' Roll Star"	Koskie	Simpletones	2:18
16.	"Disco Ape" (The Dickies alternate version)	Chuck Wagon, Stan Lee	Simpletones	1:52
17.	"Nasty Nazi"	Lansford	Simpletones	3:14
18.	"Black and Red"		Rik L Rik	3:57
19.	"Meat House"		Rik L Rik	2:44
20.	"I Got Power"		Rik L Rik	1:32
21.	"Mercenaries"		Rik L Rik	2:37
22.	"Atomic Lawn"		Rik L Rik	2:08
23.	"Modern Machine"		The Crowd	1:29
24.	"New Crew"		The Crowd	1:16
25.	"Suzy Is a Surf Rocker"		The Crowd	1:21
26.	"Living in Madrid"		The Crowd	1:20
27.	"Trix Are for Kids"		The Crowd	0:51
28.	"Right Time"	James Kaa	The Crowd	2:33
29.	"Desmond and Kathy"	James Kaa, Jay Decker	The Crowd	2:34
30.	"Melody Hill" (The Archies instrumental version)	Ritchie Adams, Mark Barkan	The Crowd	1:55
Total length:				1:05:20

=== 2005 Digipak CD edition ===
No.	Title	Artist	Length
1.	"Kirsty Q"	Simpletones	2:50
2.	"I Have a Date"	Simpletones	2:29
3.	"Tiger Beat Twist"	Simpletones	2:02
4.	"Don't Bother Me"	Simpletones	2:16
5.	"California"	Simpletones	2:51
6.	"I Like Drugs"	Simpletones	2:10
7.	"Dead Meat (Killer Smog)"	Simpletones	2:23
8.	"TV Love"	Simpletones	1:34
9.	"Rock 'n' Roll Star"	Simpletones	2:18
10.	"Disco Ape"	Simpletones	1:52
11.	"Nasty Nazi"	Simpletones	3:14
12.	"Black and Red"	Rik L Rik	3:57
13.	"Meat House"	Rik L Rik	2:44
14.	"I Got Power"	Rik L Rik	1:32
15.	"Mercenaries"	Rik L Rik	2:37
16.	"Atomic Lawn"	Rik L Rik	2:08
17.	"Modern Machine"	The Crowd	1:29
18.	"New Crew"	The Crowd	1:16
19.	"Suzy Is a Surf Rocker"	The Crowd	1:21
20.	"Living in Madrid"	The Crowd	1:20
21.	"Trix Are for Kids"	The Crowd	0:51
22.	"Right Time"	The Crowd	2:33
23.	"Desmond and Kathy"	The Crowd	2:34
24.	"Melody Hill"	The Crowd	1:55
Total length:			52:16

== Personnel ==
Simpletones

- Richard W. Scott (aka Snickers) – vocals (tracks A1 to A3, B6), backing vocals (B7)
- Jay Lansford – guitar
- Danny Ruiz – bass
- Ken "Rabbit" Bragger (credited as Rabit) – drums
- Kendall Behnke – vocals (B7)
- Jerry Koskie – backing vocals (B7)

Simpletones (1990 CD edition)

- Snickers – vocals (13, 14, 16)
- Kendall – vocals (13)
- Jerry – vocals (12, 13, 15, 17)

Rik L Rik

- Richard Elerick (best known as Rik L Rik) – vocals
- Craig Gray – guitar (A4, A5, B3, B4)
- Jay Lansford – bass, guitar (B5)
- Tim Mooney – drums

The Crowd

- Jim "Trash" Decker – vocals
- James Kaa (credited as Jim K) – lead guitar
- Tracy Porterfield – guitar
- Jay Decker – bass
- Barry "Cuda" Miranda – drums
- Dennis Walsh – drums (28 to 30 on the 1990 CD edition)

Red Cross (1981 MC edition)

- Jeff McDonald – vocals
- Greg Hetson – guitar
- Steve McDonald – bass
- Ron Reyes – drums

F-Word! (1990 CD edition)

- Rik L Rik (credited as Rick L Rick) – vocals
- Kenny Sercu (a.k.a. Dim Wanker) – guitar
- Steve Effete (a.k.a. Steve Offut) – bass
- David "Dutch" Schultz – drums
- Dirk Dirksen – emcee (1)

Production

- Robbie Fields – production (A4, A5, B3 to B5, B7), co-production (A1 to A3, A6 to B2, B6)
- Jay Lansford – co-production (A1 to A3, B6)
- The Crowd – co-production (A6 to B2)
- Rolf Erickson – engineering
- David Tarling – engineering
- Glen Lockett (best known as Spot) – engineering
- Lanky Linstrot – mastering
- Ginger Canzoneri – graphic design
- Kristina Birrer – photography
- Rodney Bingenheimer – liner notes

Additional production (1981 MC edition)

- Roger Harris – production, engineering (B6 to B11)

Additional production (1990 CD edition)

- Robbie Fields – production (1 to 6, 12), co-production (14 to 17, 28 to 30)
- Michael Corby – production (13)
- Jay Lansford – co-production (14 to 17), arrangement (16)
- The Crowd – co-production (28 to 30)
- Chip Brown – engineering (1 to 6)
- Uvex Reed – engineering (1 to 6)
- David Hines – engineering, mixing (28 to 30)
- Robert Vosgien – mastering
- Christian Witt – graphic design
- Tony Cadena (credited as Tony Montana) – liner notes
- Robbie Fields – liner notes
