= It's OK! (band) =

American musical group

- Origin: South Bay, Los Angeles, California, U.S.
- Genres: Pop, rock, soul, prog, punk
- Years active: 1992-present
- Labels: Econoclast Recordings, Moonlight Graham Records
Formerly of
- Members: Robert Hecker; Ellen Rooney; Dennis McGarry; Dave Peterson
- Past members: Victor Indrizzo; Joey Mancaruso; Roy McDonald; Eric Mitchell; Dave Naz; Bruce Nicholson; Brian Preiss; Matt Smith; Abby Travis; Fred Trujillo; Tom Underhill; Greg White; Chip Zeitgeist
- Website: http://www.itsoktheband.com

It's OK! is a musical group formed by Redd Kross members Robert Hecker (guitar, vocals) and Victor Indrizzo (drums), along with bassist Abby Travis and the late Greg White on vocals. This initial line up of the band released the self-titled debut album It's OK!.

The line up of Robert Hecker (guitar, vocals), Dave Naz (drums), Ellen Rooney (vocals, factotum), and Matt Smith (bass, vocals) recorded the second It's OK! album, Dream.

The line-up of Robert Hecker (guitar, vocals), Ellen Rooney (vocals, factotum), Dennis McGarry (bass, vocals), and Joey Mancaruso (drums, vocals) were signed by Exene Cervenka of X to Moonlight Graham Records.; however, It's OK!'s third album, Cubed, was released on Econoclast Recordings. The quartet's fourth release is aptly titled 4.

It's OK! toured California, Oregon, and Washington with Frightwig in June, 2014.

It's OK! toured California, Arizona, Texas, Oklahoma, New Mexico, and Nevada in September, 2023.

In December, 2023, it was announced that former Muffs / Redd Kross drummer Roy McDonald had joined It's OK!, and that they were working on their fifth album.

It's OK! performed at BeachLife Festival in Redondo Beach, CA on May 5, 2024, on a bill featuring ZZ Top.

The line-up of Robert Hecker, Ellen Rooney, Dennis McGarry, and Roy McDonald recorded the band's fifth album, Product Of California, which was released on Econoclast Recordings.

In January, 2026, it was announced that former Redd Kross drummer Dave Peterson had joined It's OK!.

== Discography ==
- It's OK!
- Dream
- Cubed
- 4
- Product Of California
