= Robert Hecker =

American musician and athlete

Robert Hecker (born March 7, 1965), is a guitarist, singer, and songwriter with the bands Redd Kross and It's OK!

Hecker was born in Hermosa Beach, California. He played lead guitar and sang with Redd Kross from 1984 to 1991, and again from 2005 to 2012, in addition to occasional on-stage reunions throughout the 1990s. He has also played guitar and sang with the band It's OK! since 1992.

== Music ==
=== Equipment ===
With Redd Kross during the Teen Babes from Monsanto era, 1984–1985, Hecker's main guitar was a 1979 Gibson The "SG", played through any number of different amplifiers (Peavey, Acoustic Control Corporation, Sunn, Hiwatt, Traynor, Randall).

In the mid-to-late 1980s, he played a pair of Carvin guitars: first, a red DC125, which would be enshrined at the Hard Rock Cafe in 1987; and after, a green DC200, 'Cal', which had the lower horn removed.

By 1986, and throughout the Neurotica era, he was playing through a Marshall JCM 800 driving a Carvin 4x12 cabinet. In 1988, he switched to a Mesa/Boogie Quad preamp running through a Mesa/Boogie 295 Simul-Class power amp driving a pair of Mesa/Boogie 4x12 cabinets. He would use this set up throughout the Third Eye era.

Since 1990, Hecker's main live guitar has been a custom built Ibanez, 'Ike', built by Mace Baily at the Ibanez Custom Shop in North Hollywood. It is an S body outfitted with a 24 fret Wizard neck, with the lower horn removed to facilitate full access to the 24th fret. This guitar was painted orange in 2006.

During the It's OK! Dream and Redd Kross Researching the Blues eras, his amplifier rig consisted of a Mesa/Boogie Triaxis preamp run through a Mesa/Boogie 20/20 power amp driving a pair of Mesa/Boogie 1x12 EV Thiel cabinets, and a Marshall JMP1 preamp sounding out through a pair of Marshall 1912 1x12 Celestion cabinets. For tours he would often just rent a pair of Marshall JCM 900s driving two Marshall 4x12 cabinets.

Hecker is now an official ZT Amplifiers artist; he plays through a stereo rig consisting of two ZT Lunchbox amps running through two ZT Lunchbox cabs.

=== Albums ===
- Redd Kross – Neurotica
- Redd Kross – Third Eye
- It's OK! – It's OK!
- It's OK! – Dream
- Redd Kross – Got Live if You Must! (DVD)
- Redd Kross – Researching the Blues
- It's OK! – Cubed
- It's OK! – 4
- It's OK! – Product Of California

=== Filmography ===
- Lovedolls Superstar
- Macaroni & Me
- Sheila and the Brainstem
- Citizen Tania
- Judgement Day Theater: Book of Manson
- Filmage: The Story of Descendents/All
- Desolation Center
- Jazz v. Punk: Hermosa Beach
- Born Innocent: The Redd Kross Story

== Athletics ==
In 1983, Robert Hecker ran the 110 meter high hurdles in 14.56 seconds, a Mira Costa High School (Manhattan Beach) school record for 23 years, until Drew Johnston (whom Hecker taught to hurdle) clocked 14.39 seconds at CIF prelims in 2006. Hecker ran the 60 meter hurdles in 8.1 seconds as a member of the El Camino College track team, and was the Exemplary Physical Education Major of the Year at California State University, Dominguez Hills. He was runner-up in the 110 meter high hurdles at the USA Track & Field Masters Western Regionals in 2004. In addition to his career in music, he taught science, physical education, health, and music, and coached track & field (the Daily Breeze called him the 'hurdles guru coach') in the South Bay area of Los Angeles.
