= Abby Travis =

American bassist

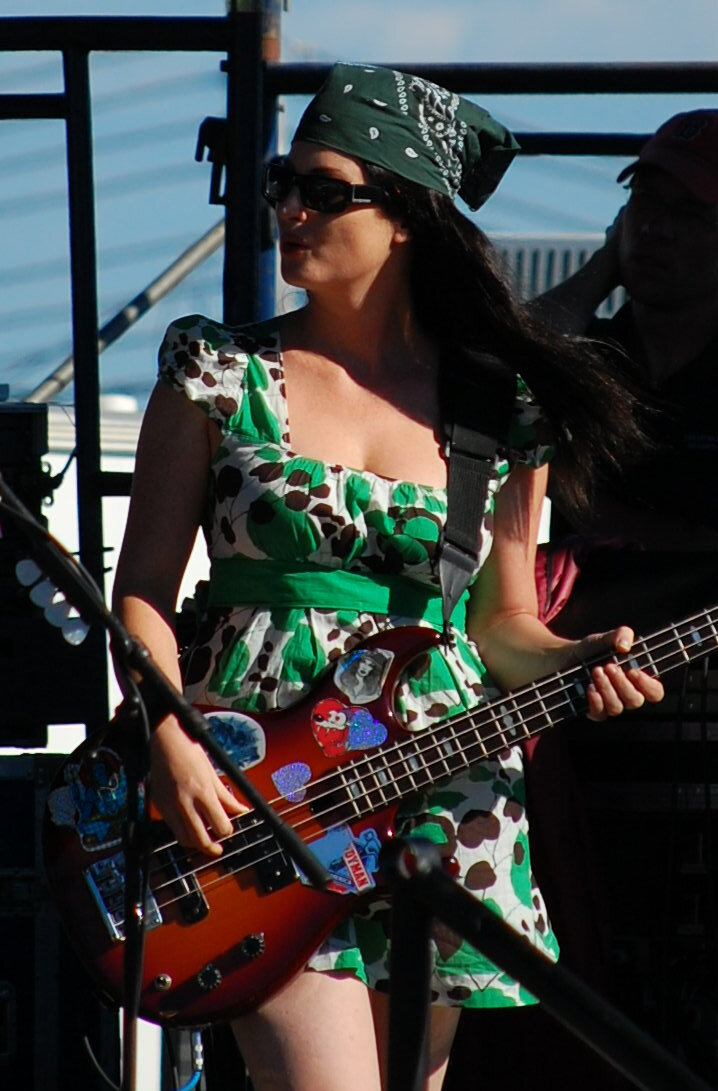
- Travis with The Bangles in 2007

Background information
- Born: November 10, 1969 (age 56); West Hartford, Connecticut, U.S.
- Occupation: Musician
- Instruments: Bass; vocals
- Years active: 1986–present
- Website: abbytravis.com

Abby Travis (born November 10, 1969) is an American musician. In the 1990s, she began working as a touring bass player. She has worked with The Go-Go's, The Eagles of Death Metal, Masters of Reality, The Bangles, KMFDM, Beck, and Elastica.

Abby's first solo record was released under the moniker The Abby Travis Foundation; the rest have been under her own. To date, she has released at total of four solo albums: The Abby Travis Foundation (1998), Cutthroat Standards & Black Pop (2000), GlitterMouth (2006), and IV (2012).

== Early life ==
Travis was born in West Hartford, Connecticut, and grew up with her older brother David. She is the daughter of Alice Travis Germond, the former Secretary of the Democratic National Committee, and Emmy Award-winning cameraman Larry Travis. She was educated at Conard High School and studied music at the Dick Grove School of Music.

== Career ==
Travis began her performance career in 1986 as the bassist in Los Angeles band The Lovedolls, who were inspired by the cult films Desperate Teenage Lovedolls and Lovedolls Superstar directed by Dave Markey. They released the album Love One Another in 1989. In 1989, Travis joined power pop trio The Rails.

Travis has been a touring and studio bass player since the early 1990s, often providing backup vocals as well. One of her first gigs was appearing with Spinal Tap on the Break Like the Wind Tour in 1992, as Promethia Pendragon dancing with elves during "Stonehenge" at the Universal Amphitheater and playing lead bass on "Big Bottom" in Phoenix, AZ. In 1993, she toured France with Vanessa Paradis on her Natural High tour. The year 1995 was particularly noteworthy as she performed with both Beck and Elastica playing back-to-back sets on the Lollapalooza tour both acts were on. She continued playing with Elastica through 1996.

In 1997, Travis played and sang on industrial group KMFDM's album Symbols. She is listed as backup singer on "Megalomaniac", "Stray Bullet", "Mercy", and "Anarchy". She played bass on "Spit Sperm" and "Unfit", and is co-credited with lyrics and co-lead vocals on "Waste" and "Down and Out". The album peaked at #189 on the Billboard 200. Her next major tours as a bass player were with Butthole Surfers singer's band Gibby Haynes and His Problem and Exene Cervenka (X) project Original Sinners in 2004. During this time she released albums in her solo career, as well as working in the studio, playing bass on Go-Go's bassist Kathy Valentine's solo album, Light Years.

She toured as bass player for Tito & Tarantula in 2005 and Eagles of Death Metal in 2010. She toured with Masters of Reality in both 2010 and 2011. Recent highlights include performing at the 2017 Los Angeles Women's March with U2's The Edge, Juliette Lewis, and Rage Against the Machine's Brad Wilke. In 2017, Travis was part of the band backing Cher, playing a residency at the Monte Carlo Resort and Casino in Las Vegas.

She contributed to WaterWays, a project featuring members of Yawning Man and Fatso Jetson, and sang on two of their EPs between 2010 and 2012.

=== The Bangles ===
In 2005, the re-formed Bangles recruited Travis as their bass player to replace longtime bassist Michael Steele who left due to "artistic reasons". The Bangles sang on Travis' song "Lies" (listed as Abby Travis and The Bangles) which was released in January 2008 to benefit New Orleans displaced musicians in January 2008. Later that year, Travis left The Bangles for undisclosed reasons.

=== The Go-Go's ===
In 2012, the Go-Go's website announced that Kathy Valentine had injured her wrist and that Abby Travis would fill in for their remaining tour dates. Valentine was supposed to re-join the band after recovery, but on March 8, 2013, The Go-Go's announced she would not be returning. Travis continued to play bass until Valentine returned in February 2018.

=== Sumo Princess ===
In 2018, Travis announced the formation of Sumo Princess, a bass-and-drums collaboration with Gene Trautmann (Eagles of Death Metal, Queens of the Stone Age). They have released two 7-inch singles and toured with Go-Go Jane Wiedlin's side project Elettrodomestico.

== Solo career ==
In 1997, Travis released her first solo album, entitled The Abby Travis Foundation on You Seem Like a Nice, Well Adjusted Person Records. The album featured Redd Kross, keyboardist Gerre Fennell, and drummer Danny Frankel.

Her second album, entitled Cutthroat Standards and Black Pop, was released in 2000 on Educational Recordings. It was co-produced by keyboardist Kristian Hoffman and was called "an edgy, sophisticated and original musical journey." Her sound has been compared to Roxy Music, Nina Simone and a gothic Marlene Dietrich.

Her third album, entitled Glitter Mouth, was released in 2006 (Educational Recordings). The style was dubbed "Cabaret Pop" and was featured on NPR.

Her fourth solo album, entitled IV, was released by Educational Recordings in 2012. Music critic Steve Hochman (California Report) compared it to glam-era David Bowie. She toured the album nationally with Jon Skibic (guitars), Claude Coleman (drums), and Joe McGinty (keyboards).

== Acting and other credits ==
Travis' first film appearance was as Jane Fonda in Weatherman '69 (1989), written and directed by Raymond Pettibon and called "a strange spoof in the worst taste imaginable" about urban middle-class terrorists, starring Thurston Moore and Kim Gordon of Sonic Youth star. In 1989, she appeared in Pettibon's The Book of Manson as Leslie. She is credited as a Barfly in Bar Girls (1994), a lesbian-themed romantic comedy directed by Marita Giovanni.

Travis played a "Member of a Punk Rock Band" in Shadow Hours (2000), written and directed by Isaac H. Eaton. She played The Torchsinger in The Devil's Muse (2007), a film about The Black Dahlia murder written and directed by Ramzi Abed. She appeared as herself on the first episode of MTV's Fashionably Loud performing with Elastica. Travis is a recurring character on Justin Tanner's web series Ave 43 (2009-). She plays Ondria and has appeared in 40 episodes.
