= Lovedolls Superstar =

Lovedolls Superstar may refer to:

- Lovedolls Superstar (film), a 1986 film
- Lovedolls Superstar (soundtrack), its soundtrack
