= Born Innocent =

Born Innocent may refer to:

- Born Innocent (film), a 1974 NBC television movie
- Born Innocent (The Proclaimers album), the fifth album by The Proclaimers released in 2003
- Born Innocent (Redd Kross album), the debut album by Red Cross released in 1982
- Born Innocent (Alcatrazz album), the fourth album by Alcatrazz released in 2020
