= SIN 34 =

American hardcore punk rock band

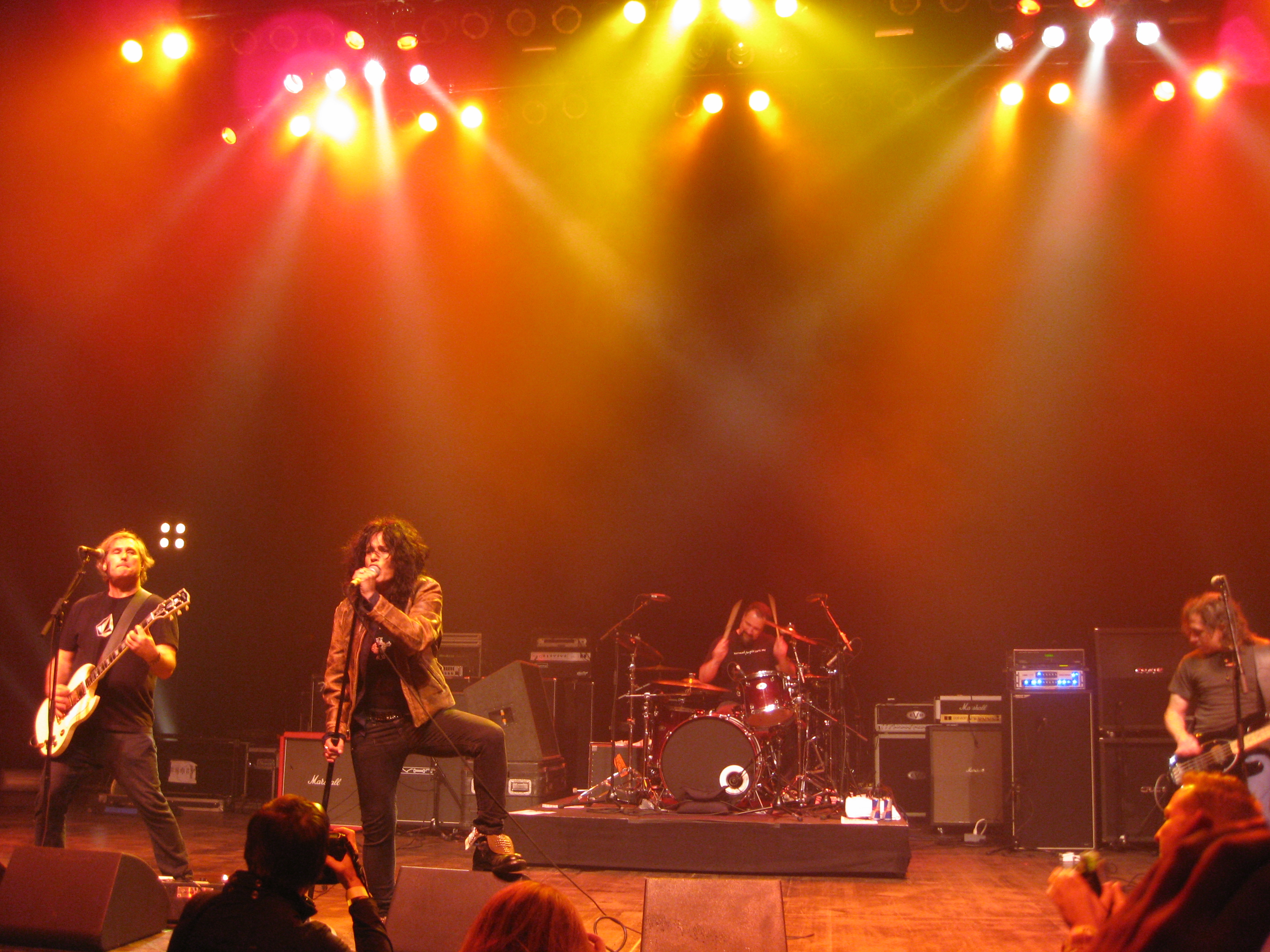
- SIN 34 in 2011

Background information
- Origin: Santa Monica, California, U.S.
- Genres: Punk rock, hardcore punk
- Years active: 1981–1984, 2008–2012
- Labels: Spinhead, Grand Theft Audio, Sinister Torch
- Past members: Julie Lanfeld-Keskin; Dave Markey; Phil Newman; Michael F. Glass; Mike Vallejo; Chris Pedersen; Scott Silverman

SIN 34 was an American hardcore punk rock band formed in 1981 in Santa Monica, California. The band featured a female front-person, Julie Lanfeld-Keskin. The band's rhythm section would go on to form Painted Willie in 1984, and sign with SST Records in 1985, and embark on a six-month national US tour with Black Flag in 1986. Reforming out of the blue in 2008, SIN 34 would once again play shows primarily in their native southern California through 2012. Longtime member and primary songwriter Phil Newman died after an apparent accident on a sail boat, February 22, 2015; the band has no plans to continue. Singer Julie Lanfeld-Keskin died April 4, 2018.

== History ==
=== 1981–1984 ===
SIN 34 was named from the Los Angeles UHF television station Spanish International Network, channel 34. The band was established by vocalist Julie "Jules" Lanfeld and drummer Dave Markey, who met at a Middle Class show at the Starwood in West Hollywood. Realizing their common bond of punk rock and interest in bands like Black Flag and Devo, Dave and Julie decided to form their own. Agreeing that "SIN 34" would be a good name after Julie noticed it written in magic marker on Dave's backpack, Julie asked classmate Phil Newman to join on bass. The band initially rehearsed as a three piece until the introduction of Circle One guitarist Mike Vallejo. Vallejo played a few shows before returning to his main band, soon to be replaced by Chris Pedersen, who went on to star in the 1984 film Suburbia, and finally finding permanence with guitarist Mike Glass.

Sin 34 played shows opening for bands including Dead Kennedys, T.S.O.L., Social Distortion, Fear and Circle Jerks. Their first and earliest recordings were featured on the cassette compilations Meathouse and Charred Remains. In 1982 the band recorded their debut EP, Die Laughing, on Spinhead Records, ran by bassist Phil Newman, a self-produced and promoted record that quickly sold 1,500 copies. The band appeared on a series of local compilations such as Smoke 7's Sudden Death, Life Is Boring So Why Not Steal This Record on Nu Underground Records and the We Got Power: Party or Go Home LP. 1983 saw the band recording a full-length album, Do You Feel Safe, at Mystic Records, under the supervision of Circle Jerks guitarist Greg Hetson, again released by Spinhead Records. The album would sell 2,500 copies in its original pressing.

Sin 34 experienced local and national college radio airplay as well as receiving positive reviews in fanzines. In March 1983, Julie was featured in an article in Thrasher magazine highlighting her skateboarding abilities. The band continued to play shows as well as re-recording the song "12 Hour Trip" for Dave Markey's film Desperate Teenage Lovedolls. (The soundtrack originally released on Gasatanka Records in 1984, was re-issued by SST Records in 1987, re-released in an expanded edition CD by Sympathy for the Record Industry in 1997). Sin 34 was also among several bands released on Mystic Records' Mystic Sampler #1 along with Suicidal Tendencies, Ill Repute, Minutemen, Vox Pop and The Mentors. In September 1984, Sin 34 disbanded due to internal pressures, among other issues.

=== 1995–1996 ===
In March 1995 record label Grand Theft Audio released the CD compilation Die Listening, a play on their earlier EP Die Laughing, containing most of their earlier 4- and 8-track recordings as well as compilation tracks, an interview conducted by Tim Yohannon on Maximum Rocknroll radio, as well as live recordings from L.A.'s Grand Olympic Auditorium. 1995 also saw appearances on two compilation re-releases; Buried Alive (The Best from Smoke Seven Records) 1981–1983 (Bomp! Records) and Teaching Your Bird to Talk (Beat Generation Records). In 1996, Bomp! included them on the Buried Alive Vol. 2 compilation.

=== 2008 ===
In 2008, after a 24-year hiatus, Julie Lanfeld initiated the reformation of the band with the original lineup of Phil Newman, Mike Glass and Dave Markey. The band played a series of shows in the southern California area, and re-released their first EP Die Laughing into the iTunes catalog.

=== 2011 ===
On August 2, 2011, American punk rock group NOFX released an untitled EP of cover versions of hardcore punk songs through Fat Wreck Chords and included a version of SIN 34's "Say We Suck". In December 2011 SIN 34 plays one of the largest shows of the band's reformation at GV30 in which radio station KROQ honored Gary Tovar and Goldenvoice Productions for 30 years as concert promoters. This event took place at Sin 34's hometown of Santa Monica at the Santa Monica Civic Auditorium. Bands on the bill included Bad Religion, T.S.O.L., Youth Brigade and The Grim.

=== 2012 ===
The SIN 34 logo was featured on the cover of Markey's book We Got Power, which chronicled the hardcore punk scene in the 1980.s

The band plays its last show June 2, 2012, at Webers in Reseda, and once again goes on hiatus.

=== 2013 ===
SIN 34 appeared on two different compilation releases: What Have We Wrought? A Benefit for Mike Atta on Burger Records and David Markey & Heavy Friends – Volume Infinite on Thick Syrup Records.

=== 2014 ===
Seattle-based independent record label, Sinister Torch, re-issued the band's only album, Do You Feel Safe, on LP, CD, cassette and digital in late 2014, making the album available commercially for the first time in 30 years.==

== Side projects ==
Glass, Markey, and Newman joined lead singer Steven McDonald of Redd Kross to form Anarchy 6, a hardcore punk parody band. Using the pseudonyms Chemical Warfare (McDonald), Spike Geek (Glass), HC Skinner (Newman) and Mark Davey (Markey), they released the studio LP Anarchy Lives! in 1988 and the live album with cover songs Live Like a Suicidal in 1990.

== Books and fanzines ==
- Flipside fanzine (1982)9

== Film and video ==
- The Slog Movie – (1982)
- SIN 34 – Trip to San Francisco (1982)90.
- Desperate Teenage Lovedolls (1984)
- Flipside Video Fanzine #1

== Former members ==
- Julie Lanfeld-Keskin – vocals
- Phil Newman – bass
- Michael F. Glass – guitar
- Dave Markey – drums

=== Briefly in the band ===
- Mike Vallejo – guitar (1981)
- Chris Pedersen – guitar (1981)
- Scott Silverman – guitar (1981)

== Discography ==
Title	Release	Label	Format
Charred Remains	1981	Version Sound	Compilation cassette
Meathouse	1982	Version Sound	Compilation cassette
Sudden Death	1982	Smoke Seven Records	Compilation LP
Die Laughing	1982	Spinhead	Sin 34 EP
Do You Feel Safe?	1983	Spinhead	Sin 34 LP
Life is Boring So Why Not Steal This Record	1983	New Underground	Compilation LP
We Got Power	1983	Mystic Records	Compilation LP
Mystic Sampler #1	1984	Mystic Records	Compilation LP
Desperate Teenage Lovedolls	1984	Gasatanka Records	Compilation LP
Desperate Teenage Lovedolls	1986	SST Records	Compilation LP
Buried Alive: (The Best from Smoke Seven Records) 1981–1983	1995	Bomp! Records	CD & LP vinyl compilation
Teaching Your Bird to Talk	1995	Beat Generation	CD compilation
Die Listening: 1981–1984 A.D.	1995	Grand Theft Audio	CD
Buried Alive Vol. 2	1996	Bomp! Records	CD, album compilation
Desperate Teenage Lovedolls – Original Motion Picture Soundtrack	1997	Sympathy for the Record Industry	CD
Sudden Death (reissue)	2004	Puke N Vomit Records	CD compilation
Party or Go Home (60 bands)	2004	Mystic Records	CD compilation
Mystic Sampler #1 & 2	2006	Mystic Records	CD compilation
What Have We Wrought? (Benefit for Mike Atta)	2013	Burger Records	Cassette compilation
David Markey & Heavy Friends – Volume Infinite	2013	Thick Syrup Records	CD & digital release
Do You Feel Safe? (re-issue)	2014	Sinister Torch Records	LP, CD, cassette and digital release
