= BeachLife Festival =

Annual music festival

- Status: Active
- Genre: Music festival
- Frequency: Yearly
- Locations: Redondo Beach, Los Angeles County, California, United States
- Years active: 2019 –
- Inaugurated: May 3, 2019
- Website: www.beachlifefestival.com

BeachLife Festival is an annual music festival held on the Redondo Beach waterfront in Los Angeles County, California.

== History ==
BeachLife Festival started in 2019, co-founded by Allen Sanford and Rob Lissner as a celebration of beach culture, recreation and lifestyle. The festival grounds are located at Seaside Lagoon in Redondo Beach.

=== 2019 ===
The first BeachLife Festival was held May 3 to 5 with performances by Bob Weir and Wolf Bros (of the Grateful Dead), Brian Wilson of The Beach Boys, and Willie Nelson as well as an acoustic performance by Slightly Stoopid. Other artists that performed include Ziggy Marley, Steel Pulse, Jason Mars, Violent Femmes, Everclear, Best Coast, Sugar Ray and others.

=== 2020 ===
The festival was originally scheduled to be held May 1 to May 3 but was postponed to September 2021 because of the COVID-19 pandemic.

=== 2021 ===
Held from September 10 to 12 with performances by Jane's Addiction, Counting Crows, Ziggy Marley and Stephen Marley, Cage the Elephant, The Revivalists, Silversun Pickups, Fitz and the Tantrums, Men at Work, The Wallflowers, Ben Harper and the Innocent Criminals, Portugal. The Man, Gary Clark Jr., Thievery Corporation, Sugar Ray, Save Ferris, the English Beat.

=== 2022 ===
Held May 13 to 15 with performances by The Smashing Pumpkins, Weezer, Steve Miller Band, 311, Stone Temple Pilots, Sheryl Crow, Lord Huron, UB40, Vance Joy, Matisyahu, Cold War Kids, Atlas Genius, Long Beach Dub Allstars, Milky Chance.

=== 2023 ===
Held May 5 to 7 with performances by Gwen Stefani, The Black Keys, Pixies, John Fogerty of Creedence Clearwater Revival, The Black Crowes, Modest Mouse, Sublime with Rome, Band of Horses, Tegan and Sara, Kurt Vile and the Violators.

=== 2024 ===
This event was held May 3 to 5 with a number of notable artists like Sting, Incubus, Seal, and more. The event was canceled on May 5th due to High Winds halfway through ZZ Top's set.

=== 2025 ===
This event happened in Redondo Beach on May 1-3 2025. The Lineup included Lenny Kravitz, Sublime, Alanis Morrisette, Train, CAKE, O.A.R, The Struts and many others. 35,000 people attended in 2025 over the three days it happened.

=== 2026 ===
The Event is set to happen on May 1-3 2026. Lineup includes Duran Duran, Offspring, James Taylor, The Chainsmokers, Slightly Stoopid, My Morning Jacket, Sheryl Crow, Joan Jett and the Blackhearts, among many others
