= Beyond the Door (album) =

Beyond The Door

Studio album by Redd Kross
- Released: August 23, 2019
- Genre: Alternative rock
- Label: Merge Records
- Producer: Jeff McDonald, Steve McDonald

Redd Kross chronology
Researching the Blues (2012)	Beyond The Door (2019)	Redd Kross (2024)

Professional ratings
Aggregate scores
Source	Rating
Metacritic	78/100
Review scores
Source	Rating
AllMusic	4/5 stars
Los Angeles Times	3.5/4 stars

Beyond the Door is the seventh album by American rock band Redd Kross, released in 2019 on Merge Records. It features guest appearances by former Redd Kross member Gere Fennelly, Buzz Osborne of The Melvins and Josh Klinghoffer of Red Hot Chili Peppers, plus songs written with Anna Waronker and Kim Shattuck. Redd Kross new members include drummer Dale Crover (The Melvins) and guitarist Jason Shapiro (Celebrity Skin). Beyond the Door features nine original songs plus cover versions of the title track from the 1968 Blake Edwards/Peter Sellers comedy The Party and the Sparks 1994 dance hit "When Do I Get to Sing 'My Way'". Bassist Steven McDonald previously played with Sparks on their 2006 album Hello Young Lovers, as well as on the accompanying tour, which also featured Josh Klinghoffer, who plays lead guitar on the track.

== Track listing ==
All tracks are written by Jeff McDonald, except where noted.

No.	Title	Writer(s)	Length
1.	"The Party"	Henry Mancini	2:10
2.	"Fighting"		2:25
3.	"Beyond The Door"	Jeff McDonald, Steve McDonald	2:33
4.	"There's No One Like You"	Steve McDonald, Anna Waronker	3:06
5.	"Ice Cream (Strange and Pleasing)"		3:43
6.	"Fantástico Roberto"		4:06
7.	"The Party Underground"	Steve McDonald	3:08
8.	"What's A Boy To Do?"		3:23
9.	"Punk II"		1:40
10.	"Jone Hoople"	Jeff McDonald, Kim Shattuck	3:16
11.	"When Do I Get to Sing 'My Way'"	Ron Mael, Russell Mael	4:01
Total length:			33:13

== Personnel ==
Redd Kross

- Jeff McDonald – vocals, guitar
- Jason Shapiro – lead guitar
- Steven McDonald – bass, backing vocals
- Dale Crover – drums

Guest Musicians

- Buzz Osborne – guitar solo (track 7)
- Josh Klinghoffer – lead guitar (track 11)
- Gere Fennelly – keyboards (track 3)

Production

- Steven McDonald – production, mixing
- Jeff McDonald – production, mixing
