= The Spirit of '76 (1990 film) =

1990 film

- Promotional poster
- Directed by: Lucas Reiner
- Written by: Lucas Reiner
- Story by: Roman Coppola; Lucas Reiner
- Produced by: Roman Coppola; Fred Fuchs
- Starring: David Cassidy; Olivia d'Abo; Leif Garrett; Geoff Hoyle; Jeff McDonald; Steve McDonald; Liam O'Brien; Barbara Bain; Julie Brown; Tommy Chong; Devo; Iron Eyes Cody; Don Novello; Carl Reiner; Rob Reiner; Moon Zappa
- Cinematography: Stephen Lighthill
- Edited by: Glen Scantlebury
- Music by: David Nichtern
- Production companies: Castle Rock Entertainment (uncredited); Commercial Pictures
- Distributed by: Columbia Pictures
- Release date: October 12, 1990
- Running time: 82 minutes
- Country: United States
- Language: English
- Box office: $52,310

The Spirit of '76 is a 1990 American comedy film that spoofs American culture of the mid-1970s. Directed by Lucas Reiner, it stars David Cassidy in his final feature film, Leif Garrett, Carl Reiner, Rob Reiner, Olivia d'Abo, and the rock groups Redd Kross and Devo. The film was released on October 12, 1990.

== Plot ==
By the year 2176, a magnetic storm has degaussed all recorded history, causing such valuable documents as the U.S. Constitution and the Declaration of Independence to be lost. Three time travelers, Adam-11 (David Cassidy), Chanel-6 (Olivia d'Abo), and Heinz-57 (Geoff Hoyle) are sent back to July 4, 1776, to retrieve America's heritage, but due to an unnoticed time machine malfunction, end up in 1976 instead, during the United States Bicentennial. While attempting to carry out their mission, the time travelers dress in period costume (e.g., tight bell bottom pants), attend EST, experience the Sexual Revolution, Pop Rocks, disco, long gas lines, the AMC Pacer, and even drug paraphernalia shops.

They are in turn pursued by Rodney Snodgrass (Liam O'Brien), a science whiz and UFO buff, who thinks they are aliens, and plans to use their UFO (their time machine) to win the Bicentennial Science Fair prize at his high school. His self-absorbed, disco-dancing brother, Eddie Trojan (Leif Garrett), pursues Chanel-6 for his own pleasure. Both are foiled by two dimwitted but good-hearted teenage friends, Tommy Sears and Chris Johnson (Steve and Jeffrey McDonald of Redd Kross), who help the time travelers repair their craft and return to 2176, with their 1970s artifacts and a copy of the Constitution, printed on a shirt which was bought off of an EST seminar attendee (Barbara Bain).

== Production ==
Several family members worked together on the production of the film. Roman Coppola co-wrote the script with Lucas Reiner and produced the film, and sister Sofia Coppola designed the era-costumes used for the piece. Lucas Reiner wrote and directed the film, and his father Carl Reiner and brother Rob Reiner both had appearances as actors in bit parts. Lucas Reiner's girlfriend at the time played a waitress in the film, and she and Reiner later married. Barbara Bain, an actress who portrayed one of the "Be Inc, Seminars" attendees, is the mother of Susie Landau, one of the producers and casting director for the film. In the DVD commentary for the 2003 edition of the film, director Lucas Reiner noted that directing the death scene with his father in the beginning of the film was difficult. Carl Reiner also appeared on the DVD commentary, and praised Lucas' job as director, as well as the script to the film.

Lucas Reiner discussed the casting of the film by producer Susie Landau, and noted that once actor David Cassidy of The Partridge Family was successfully signed to the project, other stars from the 1970s signed on as well. Several musicians also played bit roles in the film. Members of the new wave rock band Devo appeared as the "Ministry of Knowledge," Jeff McDonald and Steven Shane McDonald, members of the band Redd Kross played Chris Johnson and Tommy Sears. Martin von Haselberg and Brian Routh of The Kipper Kids portrayed the CIA agents, Tommy Chong appeared in a scene in a head shop along with his wife Shelby, and Moon Zappa had a cameo as "an archetypal zodiac aficionado." Reiner complimented Sofia Coppola on her costuming work for the film, noting that she was only seventeen years old during initial production. Coppola had to research for the 1970s as she was very young through the period, and also developed costumes for two other periods - the future in the year 2176, and the future after the time-travelers returned home and changed the culture. The production budget for the film was tight, and crew members brought in 1970s period items of their own to supplement props in the film. Production designer Danny Talpers designed the prop for the time machine out of two hot tubs - which was a reference to their popularity during the period. Instead of the more expensive cutaway technique, Reiner simply moved the camera back and forth during dialogue to save money.

== Reception ==
The Spirit of '76 received mixed reviews. The Denver Post described it as both "idiotic" and "aggressively bright", and a review in the Chicago Sun-Times did not think it was very funny. The Sacramento Bee called it a "cool comedy of the '70s," noting that it was a bit high-paced, but also "extremely likable." An Entertainment Weekly review wrote that: "References to est and disco, along with someone's mint collection of Kiss posters and other memorabilia, get tossed out willy-nilly; the movie's only unifying force is that smirky irony," and gave the film a rating of "C−". Allmovie wrote positively of the film, calling it a: "lively sci-fi comedy" that makes "great fun of the '70s." The film received two stars from the TLA Video and DVD Guide 2004, which described it as: "lightweight with the occasional laugh." On Rotten Tomatoes, the film has an aggregate score of 80% based on 4 positive and 1 negative critic review.

The film was released in only a limited number of theaters, and the total reported box office gross was $52,310.

== Home media ==
SVS/Triumph Home Video released The Spirit of '76 on VHS on January 22, 1992. It was released on DVD by Warner Home Video on June 3, 2003.

== Soundtrack ==
- Average White Band – "Pick Up the Pieces"
- Chicago – "Saturday in the Park"
- The Carpenters – "Top of the World"
- Grand Funk Railroad – "We're an American Band"
- Starland Vocal Band – "Afternoon Delight"
- Love Unlimited Orchestra – "Love's Theme"
- Maria Muldaur – "Midnight at the Oasis"
- The Hues Corporation – "Rock the Boat"
- Peter Tosh – "Legalize It"
- Blue Öyster Cult – "(Don't Fear) The Reaper"
- Walter Murphy – "A Fifth of Beethoven"
- Bachman–Turner Overdrive – "Takin' Care of Business"
- Van McCoy – "The Hustle"
- Peter Frampton – "Do You Feel Like We Do"
- Sweet – "Fox on the Run"
- Eli's Second Coming – "Love Chant"
- Carl Douglas – "Kung Fu Fighting"
- Wild Cherry – "Play That Funky Music"
- Rick Derringer – "Rock and Roll, Hoochie Koo"
- Vicki Sue Robinson – "Turn the Beat Around"
- Disco-Tex and the Sex-O-Lettes – "Get Dancin'"
- Edgar Winter Group – "Frankenstein"
- The Sylvers – "Boogie Fever"
- The Trammps – "Disco Inferno"
- Bay City Rollers – "Saturday Night"
- Redd Kross – "1976"
- The Dickies – "Spirit of '76"

== See also ==
- 1970s nostalgia
