= Desperate Teenage Lovedolls (soundtrack) =

1984 soundtrack album

Desperate Teenage Lovedolls: Original Motion Picture Soundtrack

Soundtrack album by Redd Kross Nip Drivers Black Flag Greg Graffin and Greg Hetson White Flag Sin 34 Bags Darkside
- Released: 1984
- Genres: Punk, Hardcore punk, Indie, Rock
- Labels: Sympathy for the Record Industry (originally Gasatanka Records and SST Records)

Redd Kross Nip Drivers Black Flag Greg Graffin and Greg Hetson White Flag Sin 34 Bags Darkside chronology
Desperate Teenage Lovedolls: Original Motion Picture Soundtrack (1984)	Lovedolls Superstar (1986)

Desperate Teenage Lovedolls: Original Motion Picture Soundtrack is an album of music from the film Desperate Teenage Lovedolls. The soundtrack was originally released on Gasatanka Records in 1984, re-issued by SST Records in 1987 and re-released again in an expanded edition on CD by Sympathy For The Record Industry in 1997.

== Track listing of the 1997 CD Reissue ==
1. Redd Kross - "Ballad of a Lovedoll" - 1:49
2. Redd Kross - "Legend (Come On Up to Me)" - 2:48
3. Nip Drivers - "Fox on the Run" - 2:33
4. Redd Kross - "Out of Focus" - 3:19
5. Black Flag - "Life of Pain" - 2:55
6. Red Kross - "Self Respect" - 0:48
7. Greg Graffin & Greg Hetson - "Running Fast" - 3:23
8. White Flag - "Johnny Tremaine's Theme" - 2:30
9. SIN 34 - "12 Hour Trip" - 2:23
10. Bags - "Survive" - 2:56
11. Redd Kross - "Charlie" - 1:51
12. Redd Kross - "Stairway to Heaven" - 2:56
13. Redd Kross - "Purple Haze" - 2:54
14. Darkside - "Right's Right" - 2:32
15. White Flag - "You Got Me" - 2:54
16. White Flag - "Hot Bitch (With an Electric Guitar)" - 2:54
17. Redd Kross - "Ballad of a Lovedoll" - 2:22
18. Desperate Teenage Lovedolls - "Desperate Teenage Lovedolls Radio Spot/Dave Markey" - 1:02
19. Desperate Teenage Lovedolls - "Interview With Jeff & Steve McDonald (with Edith Massey & Stella)" - 5:52

== See also ==
- Desperate Teenage Lovedolls (film)
- Lovedolls Superstar (film)
- Lovedolls Superstar (soundtrack)
