= Painted Willie =

American punk rock band (formed 1984)

- Origin: Los Angeles, California, U.S.
- Genres: Punk rock
- Years active: 1984–1987
- Labels: Spinhead, SST, DC-Jam
- Past members: Dave Markey; Phil Newman (R.I.P.); Vic Makauskas; Nick Delaney; Mike Vallejo

Painted Willie was an American punk rock band started in 1984 in Los Angeles by drummer and film-maker Dave Markey after the demise of his first band, Sin 34. They were active from 1984 to 1987 and released one 7", two 12 inch EPs and three LPs.

== History ==
After the demise of SIN 34 the band's rhythm section (drummer Dave Markey and bassist Phil Newman) formed a new band with guitarists Vic Makauskas (formerly of SVDB) and Nick Delaney from Vancouver, Canada's No Exit. Newman chose the name Painted Willie from a 1950s thesaurus he had found in a thrift store which defined it as an old English synonym for homosexual, or more approximately transvestite or drag queen.

Makauskas quit the band just before their first show at Cathay de Grande and Painted Willie became a trio and recorded a three-song (one song each from each member) eponymous 7-inch EP on Phil's own Spinhead Records. After a while, Delaney was expelled from the band because of tensions between him and the other two members. The band then records the My Fellow Americans 12-inch EP as a two-piece, with Newman playing both bass and guitar. For the live shows played in 1984, the band recruited guitar player Mike Vallejo of Circle One, who had also been a member of SIN 34. The band's first two self-produced releases displayed a distinct musical progression from Newman's and Markey's previous hardcore band, employing quirky, experimental and psychedelic elements.

Vic Makauskas was back in the band in 1985 as Painted Willie wrote a new set of material with somewhat of a more straight forward approach. They recorded two demos that got them signed to SST Records in 1985. The band re-recorded the ten songs they had done as demos with Black Flag guitarist Greg Ginn, producing and released it as the Mind Bowling LP. SST also distributes Dave's new Super-8 feature film Lovedolls Superstar, the sequel to Desperate Teenage Lovedolls.

Painted Willie then embarked on a six-month national tour opening for Black Flag in 1986, with Gone as the opening act, which would be Black Flag's last tour. The band recorded and released a live EP recorded during that tour titled simply Live From Van Nuys. Markey filmed nine hours of footage for an eventual documentary of the tour Reality 86'd but Ginn did not want it to be released. Black Flag singer Henry Rollins tried to have it released in 1994 through a distribution deal he struck with Time Warner, but Ginn still refused.

Painted Willie embarked on another US tour in 1987 in support their follow up LP Upsidedowntown, and broke apart soon thereafter while Newman joined the band I Love You. In 1988, SST released a posthumous compilation of Painted Willie's early work on the LP Relics. This would be the band's swan song, along with a cover of Captain Beefheart's "Clear Spot" for The Melting Plot compilation. SST also re-distributed the 7" and 12" EPs Painted Willie released on Spinhead Records. DC-Jam Records re-released Mind Bowling on CD in 2009.

== Members ==
- Dave Markey - Drums, vocals
- Phil Newman - Bass, vocals
- Vic Makauskas - Guitar (Early 1984, 1985–1987)
- Nick "Willie" Delaney - Guitar, vocals (1984)
- Mike Vallejo - Guitar (touring member only, 1984)

== Discography ==
=== Albums ===
- My Fellow Americans LP (Spinhead Records, 1984)
- Mind Bowling LP (SST Records, 1985)
- Live from Van Nuys EP (SST Records, 1986)
- Upsidedowntown LP (SST Records, 1987)
- Relics LP (SST Records, 1988)

=== Singles ===
- "Painted Willie" 7" (Spinhead Records, 1984)

=== Compilation albums ===
- Lovedolls Superstar LP (SST Records, 1986) - features the track "Darling Shelah"
- The Blasting Concept Volume II LP (SST Records, 1986) - features the track "The Big Time"
- SST Godhead Storedude In-Store Play Device No. 2 LP (SST Records, 1986) - features the tracks "Upsidedowntown" and "Subject"
- SST Godhead Storedude In-Store Play Device No. 5 LP (SST Records, 1987) - features the track "My Fellow Americans"
- SST Over 35 Videos Never Before Released LP (SST Records, 1987) - features the tracks "Upsidedownton" and "Little..."
- The Melting Plot LP (SST Records, 1988) - features the track "Clear Spot"
