= Posh Boy Records =

American record label

- Founded: 1978
- Founder: Robbie Fields
- Genre: Punk rock; hardcore punk
- Country of origin: United States
- Location: Hollywood, Los Angeles, California
- Official website: www.poshboy.com

Posh Boy Records is a Hollywood, California-based record label owned by the American-born, British-educated Robbie "Posh Boy" Fields, a sometime high school substitute teacher and former copy boy at the Los Angeles Times who took an interest in the emerging punk rock scene in Orange County, California during the late 1970s.

The label's releases enjoyed substantial airplay on Rodney Bingenheimer's show on KROQ-FM, and some of them, notably the Fields-produced version of "Amoeba" by the Adolescents and the Stephen Hague-produced electronic rock track "Are You Ready for the Sex Girls" by the Sparks offshoot the Gleaming Spires, made it into regular programming on the station.

Social Distortion was one of many bands whose first recordings were issued by Posh Boy. One of the label's most successful releases was Agent Orange's debut, Living in Darkness, containing "Bloodstains", an extreme sports anthem covered by many alternative rock groups (the most notable being the Offspring in 2000 on the Ready to Rumble film soundtrack).

Since 1999, expatriate and now known as Posh Boy Music, the label continued releasing music into the 2020s, the last vinyl release being a 7" by the Willowz of Anaheim, California in 2003. Subsequently, the label transitioned to being digital only with over 700 recordings released digitally, and to sublicense vinyl, Compact Disc and audio cassette rights to other labels, notably Radiation Records (Italy).

More recently, the label entered into a licensing agreement with Netflix for use of its extensive back catalog. Stranger Things 2 has used music by Posh Boy acts Channel 3 and Ill Repute. Channel 3 were also featured in the inaugural season of White Famous on Showtime.

During the COVID lockdown, post 2020, the label pivoted to concentrate on non-punk music with an emphasis on chamber music working with such leading musicians as composer Gene Pritsker, Some Nicholson, the painter David Nicholson, classical guitarist Warren Nicholson, violist Paul Cortese, singer Chanda Rule amongst others. Recent pop music signings include Scottish band The Moon Kids., Phil Proietti and Keysha Veen who scored a bona fide hit on SiriusXM's Velvet Channel with "You Saved My World". Alternative releases include Channel 3, Professor and the Madman, Santa Barbara's The Tearaways and 1980s' comedy icon Nigel Planer.

== Early Releases ==
The label released the following records:

Year	Artist	Title	Format	Type	Catalog #
1978	F-Word!	"Shut Down"	7"	live single	PBS 1
1978	F-Word!	Like It or Not Live	LP	live album	PBS 101
1979	Simpletones	"California"	7"	single	PBS 3
1979	Rik L Rik	"Meat House"	7"	single	PBS 4
1979	various artists	Beach Blvd	LP	compilation album	PBS 102
1980	various artists	The Siren	LP	compilation album	PBS 103
1980	various artists	Rodney on the ROQ	LP	compilation album	PBS 106
1980	Red Cross	Red Cross	12"	EP	PBS 1010
1981	391	391	12"	EP	PBS 1017
1981	CH3	CH3	12"	EP	PBS 1018
1981	various artists	Rodney on the ROQ - Volume 2	LP	compilation album	PBS 123
1981	Agent Orange	"Everything Turns Grey"	7"	single	PBS 12
1981	Black Flag	"Louie Louie"	7"	single	PBS 13
	Bron Area	"You Would Be Amazed"	7"	single	PBS 16
	The Buddy System	"Read My Lips"	7"	single	PBS 35
1981	T.S.O.L.	T.S.O.L.	12"	EP	PBS 1013
1981	U.X.A.	Illusions of Grandeur	LP	studio album	PBS 104
1982	CH3	Fear of Life	LP	studio album	PBS 128
1982	Gothic Hut	self titled	LP	studio album	PBS 143
1982	Baby Buddha	Music for Teenage Sex	LP	studio album	PBS 114
1981	various artists	The Future Looks Bright Ahead	CS	compilation album	PBC 120
1981	Agent Orange	Living in Darkness	LP, CD	studio album	PBS 122
	various artists	Punk and Disorderly	LP, CD	compilation album	PBS 131
1982	Agent Orange	Bitchin' Summer	12"	EP	PBS 1037
1982	Symbol Six	Symbol Six	12"	EP	PBS 1030
1982	various artists	Posh Hits Vol. 1	LP	compilation album	PBS 8138
	The Buddy System	The Buddy System	LP	studio album	PBS 8149
1982	various artists	Rodney on the ROQ Vol. III	LP	compilation album	PBS 140
1987	various artists	The Future Looks Brighter	LP, CD	compilation album	PBS 120, PBCD 120
1991	various artists	History of Rik L Rik	LP	3-LP box set	PBS 88101
1991	various artists	The Posh E.P.s Vol. 1	12"	3-EP box set	PBS 88111
1989	various artists	The Best of Rodney on the ROQ	CD	compilation album	PBCD 88155
1990	various artists	Posh Boy • The Singles Vol. One	LP	compilation album	
	various artists	The Posh Boy Story (More or Less)	CD	compilation album	PBCD 8160
	Tatjana Balazs	The Complete Etudes – Chopin	CD	studio album	PBCD 8161
	various artists	Rikk Agnew: Smash Demos Vol. II	CD	compilation album	PBCD 8163
1990	Adolescents	"Amoeba"	7"	single	PBS 6
1990	Agent Orange	"Eldorado"	7"	single	PBS 30
1994	Mr. Firley	California (45)	LP	studio album	PBS 39
