= Red Cross (EP) =

EP by Red Cross
- Released: 1980, 1981
- Recorded: October 1, 1979
- Studio: The Shelter
- Genre: Punk rock
- Length: 6:22
- Language: English
- Label: Posh Boy
- Producer: Roger Harris

Red Cross chronology
Red Cross (1980)	Born Innocent (1982)

Alternate cover art
- First pressing in a generic sleeve.

Alternative cover
- 1987 reissue as Annette's Got the Hits.

Professional ratings
Review scores
Source	Rating
AllMusic	4/5 stars

Red Cross, a six-song punk rock EP record, is the first stand-alone release by American rock band Red Cross. (Note: "Following the album's release [Born Innocent, 1982], the band was threatened with a lawsuit from the real International Red Cross; as a result, [as of late 1982] the group became Redd Kross...")

== Background ==
On August 29, 1979, the day after Ron Reyes joined them on drums, replacing John Stielow, McDonald brothers' middle school punk rock band, the Tourists, would change their name to "Red Cross". Soon after, on September 6, they would go into a recording studio for the first time, accompanied by Joe Nolte, leader of Los Angeles rock band The Last, who produced their session at Media Art Studio in Hermosa Beach, California. However, when Red Cross signed not long after with Posh Boy Records, its owner, Robbie Fields, (Note: The American-born Englishman who was the founder of Posh Boy Records.) didn't like the Nolte recordings, so, he would get most of the songs to be re-recorded .

Only one of the cuts from the Nolte session would be later released. "Rich Brat" was included on the 1982 New Underground Records compilation album Life Is Ugly So Why Not Kill Yourself. (Note: New Underground Records #NU-11)

"By September [1979], Red Cross had saved up enough money to record a demo, booking some time at Media Arts for their first recording session. "I came home one night, real tired, and all I wanted to do was curl up and go to sleep," ... "They said, 'We're going to the studio tonight, and we don't know what to do.' So I ended up producing the session, after drinking three cups of coffee. We had fun, and they sounded good, and I sorta liked the recordings. Their label, Posh Boy, hated them though, and made them record everything again."

— Joe Nolte as quoted in the book Spray Paint the Walls: The Story of Black Flag

In 1980, six tracks from the Posh Boy recording session were included on The Siren, (Note: Posh Boy #PBS 103) a sampler LP shared with San Francisco power pop band 391, and Salt Lake City punk rock act Spittin' Teeth. Their participation in this album would be the recorded debut for Red Cross; so, their following release, the Red Cross EP, would be but a stand-alone reissue of those same songs.

== Production ==
All songs on Red Cross were originally recorded with producer and engineer Roger Harris at the Shelter Studios in Hollywood, California on October 1, 1979. The mixing was done at Paradise Studios in Burbank, California.

== Release ==
Red Cross was first released in 1980 on Posh Boy Records, in 12-inch vinyl disc format. (Note: Posh Boy #PBS 1010) The first pressing, without any cover art, came with pinkish-red labels and packaged in a generic, multicolored die-cut record sleeve.

== Reissues ==
In 1981, Red Cross was included, in its entirety, on the rare cassette tape version of the Beach Blvd compilation (Note: Posh Boy #PBC 102) issued by Posh Boy Records.

By 1985, Red Cross was re-released featuring its own cover art, and disc labels printed in black and red on a silver background. This same edition would be repressed the year after.

A new repressing was released in 1987, featuring disc labels printed in black on a silver background and packaged in a generic record company sleeve as the original release.

In 1987, Posh Boy repackaged The Future Looks Bright, (Note: Posh Boy #PBC 120) a sampler album originally produced by the label, jointly with SST Records, in 1981. (Note: "[The Future Looks Bright was] Originally a ... cassette only release with 500 white label vinyl versions [Posh Boy #PBS 120] pressed without cover art for radio promotion. Posh Boy supplied the bands for Side A, [and] SST Records the bands for Side B...") Retitled as The Future Looks Brighter, this edition featured only artists from the Posh Boy roster. The complete Red Cross EP was added to the CD version. (Note: Posh Boy #PBCD 120)

In late 1987, the EP was reissued under the title Annette's Got the Hits, featuring alternate cover art but keeping the same catalog number and the old disc labels from the 1985 re-release.

In 1990, Posh Boy issued the single "Cover Band", (Note: Posh Boy #PBS 22) (Note: Credited to the McDonald brothers instead to Greg Hetson.) bundled with "Burn Out" on its flip side.

In 1991, Annette's Got the Hits was included in the numbered 3-EP box set The Posh E.P.'s Vol. 1, (Note: Posh Boy #PBS 88111-1) in conjunction with Stepmothers' 1981 EP All Systems Go (Note: Posh Boy #PBS 1009) and an untitled six-track EP featuring Social Distortion's early songs recorded in 1981. (Note: Posh Boy #PBS 1011. Originally a four-track test pressing, with the working title Posh Boy's Little Monsters, the record was a project intended as Social Distortion's first release, which never materialized. Instead, the band's first recordings were featured on several compilations and one single. In the liner notes for the 1987 compilation The Future Looks Brighter, Robbie Fields commented: "... When Social Distortion recorded for Posh Boy in [April] 1981, it was contemplated that [the label] would release a 12" e.p. ... Somehow PBS 1011 ... never got released and instead there were singles ... and cuts on various compilations...")

In 2020 a 40th Anniversary edition was reissued by Merge Records with the original rejected Joe Nolte (leader of Los Angeles rock band The Last) session tracks from September 1979 added and one live track recorded in July 1979 by 'The Tourists', the original band name before they changed it to Red Cross in August 1979.

== Cover art ==
The original cover art for Red Cross, informally referred to as "the red cover", shows the band's name on a red background, written, with its original spelling, in uppercase white letters resembling strips of medical tape.

On the cover art for Annette's Got the Hits, a photomontage in sepia, portraying the four band members performing live, is displayed on a dark grey background. The original spelling of the group's name is changed to "Redd Kross".

== Re-recordings ==
After Greg Hetson left Red Cross to join the Circle Jerks in December 1979, a controversial alternate version of his song "Cover Band", (Note: According to Ken Salter, who played in a high school punk rock band called the Mongrels (1978-79) with Falling James Moreland of the Leaving Trains, Greg Hetson, who was in the group for only two weeks, stole the music of his song "Civilization" from 1978, which would be later used, first in Red Cross' song "Cover Band", recorded in October 1979, and subsequently in Circle Jerks' song "Live Fast Die Young", recorded in July 1980. According to George Hurchalla, author of Going Underground: American Punk 1979-1989, there's a demo recording that proves this.) reworked with new lyrics by Keith Morris, was featured as "Live Fast Die Young" on his new band's first studio album, Group Sex, (Note: Frontier #FLP 1002) released in October 1980 on Frontier Records.

== Track listing ==
Side A
No.	Title	Lyrics/Music	Length
1.	"Cover Band"	Greg Hetson	1:25
2.	"Annette's Got the Hits"	Steve McDonald/Jeff McDonald	1:08
3.	"I Hate My School"	J. McDonald	0:57

Side B
No.	Title	Lyrics/Music	Length
1.	"Clorox Girls"	S. McDonald/J. McDonald	0:58
2.	"S & M Party"	Hetson/J. McDonald	0:56
3.	"Standing in Front of Poseur"	J. McDonald	0:58
Total length:			6:22

== Personnel ==
Red Cross

- Jeff McDonald – vocals
- Greg Hetson – guitar
- Steve McDonald – bass, vocals
- Ron Reyes – drums

Production

- Robbie Fields – executive in charge of production
- Roger Harris – production, engineering
