= Redd Kross (album) =

Redd Kross AKA The Redd Album

Studio album by Redd Kross
- Released: June 28, 2024
- Genre: Alternative rock
- Label: In the Red
- Producer: Josh Klinghoffer

Redd Kross chronology
Beyond the Door (2019)	Redd Kross AKA The Redd Album (2024)

Professional ratings
Aggregate scores
Source	Rating
Metacritic	84/100
Review scores
Source	Rating
AllMusic	4.5/5 stars
Pitchfork	7.8/10 stars

Redd Kross (also known as The Redd Album) is the ninth studio full length album by American rock band Redd Kross, released in 2024 on In The Red Records.

"Decades deep into a monumental career, you wouldn’t expect Redd Kross to hit a power-pop zenith. But they’ve done just that with their self-titled double album—all in their trademark flying colors. – GRADE: A"

== Track listing ==
All tracks are written by Jeff McDonald/Steve McDonald, except where noted.

No.	Title	Writer(s)	Length
1.	"Candy Coloured Catastrophe"	Jeff McDonald	03:25
2.	"Stunt Queen"		04:16
3.	"The Main Attraction"	Steve McDonald	03:23
4.	"Cancion Enojada"		02:13
5.	"Good Times Propaganda Band"		03:53
6.	"What's In It For You"	Jeff McDonald	03:44
7.	"I'll Take Your Word For It"	Steve McDonald	03:09
8.	"Terrible Band"	Jeff McDonald	04:02
9.	"Stuff"	Steve McDonald	02:37
10.	"Back Of The Cave"		02:39
11.	"Too Good To Be True"		03:00
12.	"Way Too Happy"	Steve McDonald	02:34
13.	"Simple Magic"		02:26
14.	"The Witches Stand"		04:02
15.	"Lay Down and Die"	Steve McDonald	03:00
16.	"The Shaman's Disappearing Robe"		03:15
17.	"Emanuelle Insane"		02:16
18.	"Born Innocent"		03:48
Total length:			57:51

== Personnel ==
Redd Kross

- Jeff McDonald – vocals, guitar, percussion
- Jason Shapiro – lead guitar
- Steven McDonald – vocals, bass, guitar, percussion
- Josh Klinghoffer – drums, guitar, keys, percussion

Guest Musicians

- Josh Klinghoffer – Drums, Guitars, Keyboards, Percussion
- Gere Fennelly – keyboards (track 3)

Production

- Josh Klinghoffer – production
- Michael Craver – engineer, mixing
- Steven McDonald – additional engineering
- Frank Mitaritonna – additional engineering
- Dave Cooley – mastering
