= Phaseshifter =

Studio album by Redd Kross
- Released: October 5, 1993
- Genre: Alternative rock; grunge
- Label: This Way Up/Mercury
- Producer: Redd Kross

Redd Kross chronology
Third Eye (1990)	Phaseshifter (1993)	Show World (1997)

Singles from Phaseshifter
- 1. "Jimmy's Fantasy" Released: 1993; 2. "Lady in the Front Row" Released: 1993; 3. "Visionary" Released: 1994

Phaseshifter is a 1993 album by the American rock band Redd Kross. Three singles were released from the album: "Jimmy's Fantasy", "Lady In The Front Row" and "Visionary".

The album peaked at number 99 on the Australian ARIA albums chart in April 1994. The band supported the album by touring with the Lemonheads.

== Production ==
The album was produced by the band and mixed by John Agnello. Unlike with previous albums, Redd Kross had to scramble to write or find all new songs for Phaseshifter. "Crazy World" was originally recorded by Frightwig. The McDonald brothers brought on three new bandmates for the recording sessions.

== Critical reception ==
Professional ratings
Review scores
Source	Rating
AllMusic	4/5 stars
Pitchfork	6.9/10

Trouser Press wrote: "With the comic relief in the songs kept out of the spotlight ... it's possible to overlook the McDonalds' colorful personalities in the lighthearted songs, hearing only the catchy tunes, the Big Noise and the skilled musicianship." The Vancouver Sun called the album "12 songs of endearing melodies and post-adolescent emotionalism ... enveloped in the fierce energy of the band's live performances." The Virginian-Pilot labeled it "a fully convincing hard-rock record that could have been the follow-up to Cheap Trick at Budokan."

The Press-Telegram deemed the album "a brilliant merger of bubblegum and thrash-punk"; the Fort Worth Star-Telegram considered it "great trash-metal." The Morning Call listed Phaseshifter among the best albums of 1993.

AllMusic wrote that the band "seem more bent on cutting straightforward and driving, power pop/rock anthems than going in for their '80s-style, HR Pufnstuf form of garage psychedelia."

== Track listing ==
All songs written by Jeff McDonald and Steve McDonald, except where noted.

1. "Jimmy's Fantasy" (J. Mcdonald, S. McDonald, Bill Bartell, Eddie Kurdziel) – 3:45
2. "Lady in the Front Row" (J. Mcdonald, S. McDonald, Kurdziel) – 3:20
3. "Monolith" – 4:12
4. "Crazy World" (D. Chirazi) – 4:30
5. "Dumb Angel" (J. Mcdonald, S. McDonald, Bartell, Roger Manning) – 2:57
6. "Huge Wonder" – 5:02
7. "Visionary" – 4:04
8. "Pay for Love" (J. Mcdonald, S. McDonald, Gere Fennelly, Charlotte Caffey) – 4:13
9. "Ms. Lady Evans" – 2:47
10. "Only a Girl" – 3:43
11. "Saragon" – 2:46
12. "After School Special" (J. Mcdonald, S. McDonald, Fennelly) – 2:54
13. "Any Hour, Every Day" (bonus track on UK/Japanese/Australian CD)

== Personnel ==
- Steven Shane McDonald – bass, vocals
- Jeff McDonald – guitar, vocals
- Eddie Kurdziel – lead guitar
- Gere Fennelly – Mellotron, piano, keyboards
- Brian Reitzell – drums, timpani, percussion

== Charts ==
Chart performance for Phaseshiter
Chart (1993)	Peak position
Australian Albums (ARIA)	99
