= Third Eye (Redd Kross album) =

Studio album by Redd Kross
- Released: September 14, 1990
- Studio: Sound City
- Genre: Alternative rock
- Length: 43:59
- Label: Atlantic
- Producer: Michael Vail Blum

Redd Kross chronology
Neurotica (1987)	Third Eye (1990)	Phaseshifter (1993)

Singles from Third Eye
- 1. "Annie's Gone" Released: 1991

Professional ratings
Review scores
Source	Rating
AllMusic	4.5/5 stars
Entertainment Weekly	B
Q	4/5 stars
Rolling Stone	4/5 stars

Third Eye is the third studio album by Redd Kross. It was released by Atlantic Records on September 14, 1990. It includes "Annie's Gone", which peaked at number 16 on Billboard's Alternative Songs chart. The naked masked woman on the cover of the album is Sofia Coppola. The band's guitarist Robert Hecker provided vocals on "1976", doing a Paul Stanley impersonation, which led people to believe Stanley did the singing.

== Critical reception ==
Alex Henderson of AllMusic said: "While some punk enthusiasts missed the old Kross, this decent though not outstanding album proves that the band was still worthwhile at the dawn of the '90s." Greg Sandow of Entertainment Weekly gave the album a grade of B, saying: "Their uncanny '60s echoes have to be taken with a mountain or two of irony, which — take your choice — gives the album depth, or else weighs the group's cute little tunes down with more significance than they can easily bear." Jeremy Clarke in Q described the album as a "potent neo-pop with bright melodies".

== Track listing ==
No.	Title	Writer(s)	Length
1.	"The Faith Healer"	Jeff McDonald	3:52
2.	"Annie's Gone"	J. McDonald, Steven Shane McDonald, Michael Cudahy	3:36
3.	"I Don't Know How to Be Your Friend"	J. McDonald	3:55
4.	"Shonen Knife"	J. McDonald	3:22
5.	"Bubblegum Factory"	J. McDonald	2:50
6.	"Where I Am Today"	S. McDonald	5:03
7.	"Zira (Call Out My Name)"	Robert Hecker	4:09
8.	"Love Is Not Love"	J. McDonald, S. McDonald	4:32
9.	"1976"	J. McDonald, Victor Indrizzo	3:44
10.	"Debbie & Kim"	J. McDonald, S. McDonald, Hecker	4:01
11.	"Elephant Flares"	J. McDonald, S. McDonald, Hecker, Indrizzo	4:03

== Personnel ==
Credits adapted from liner notes.

Redd Kross

- Jeff McDonald – vocals, guitar
- Steven Shane McDonald – bass guitar, vocals
- Robert Hecker – guitar, vocals

Additional musicians

- Victor Indrizzo – drums, vocals
- Peter Levine – keyboards
- Michael Quercio – intro guitar riff (1)
- Susan Cowsill – additional vocals (5, 8), background vocals
- Vanessa Bell Armstrong – vocal solo (7), background vocals
- Mary Bernard – background vocals
- Paula Salvatore – background vocals
- Brian McCloud – percussion
- Charles Davis – trumpet
- Gregory Alper – saxophone

Technical personnel

- Michael Vail Blum – production, engineering
- Brian Jenkins – additional engineering
- Craig Doubet – additional engineering
- Bret Newman – additional engineering
- David Eaton – additional engineering
- Joe Barresi – additional engineering
- Paul McKenna – mixing
- Greg Fulginiti – mastering
- Doug Erb – sleeve design, logo
- Vicki Berndt – cover photo concept, painting, B&W photography
- Mojgan B. Azimi – cover photography
