= Geoff McDonald =

Geoff McDonald may refer to:

- Geoff McDonald, American musician with 2010s indie band Miracles of Modern Science
- Geoff McDonald, a Christian right-wing pundit in New Zealand in the 1980s
- Geoff McDonald (mayor), Australian politician, mayor of Toowoomba, Queensland since 2023

== See also ==
- Geoff Macdonald, American tennis coach
- Jeff MacDonald (disambiguation)
