= Researching the Blues =

Studio album by Redd Kross
- Released: August 7, 2012
- Genres: Alternative rock; power pop
- Length: 31:48
- Label: Merge
- Producer: Steve McDonald

Redd Kross chronology
| Show World (1997) | Researching the Blues (2012) | Beyond the Door (2019) |

Researching the Blues is the sixth album by American rock band Redd Kross, released in 2012 on Merge Records.

== Reception ==
Professional ratings
Aggregate scores
| Source | Rating |
|---|---|
| Metacritic | 81/100 |
Review scores
| Source | Rating |
| AllMusic | 4.5/5 stars |
| The A.V. Club | B+ |
| Beats per Minute | 80% |
| Chicago Tribune | 3/4 stars |
| Consequence of Sound | 3/5 stars |
| The Guardian | 4/5 stars |
| Los Angeles Times | 3/4 stars |
| Paste | 9/10 |
| Pitchfork | 7.1/10 |
| PopMatters | 8/10 |
| Spin | 6/10 |

Researching the Blues received positive reviews from critics. On Metacritic, the album holds a score of 81/100 based on 25 reviews, indicating "universal acclaim".

== Track listing ==
All tracks are written by Jeff McDonald, except where noted.

| No. | Title | Writer(s) | Length |
|---|---|---|---|
| 1. | "Researching the Blues" | | 3:52 |
| 2. | "Stay Away from Downtown" | | 3:37 |
| 3. | "Uglier" | J. McDonald, Charlotte Caffey, Steve McDonald, Anna Waronker | 3:52 |
| 4. | "Dracula's Daughters" | | 3:06 |
| 5. | "Meet Frankenstein" | | 1:48 |
| 6. | "One of the Good Ones" | | 2:32 |
| 7. | "The Nu Temptations" | | 3:37 |
| 8. | "Choose to Play" | | 3:09 |
| 9. | "Winter Blues" | | 2:26 |
| 10. | "Hazel Eyes" | | 3:49 |
| Total length: | | | 31:48 |

== Personnel ==
Redd Kross

- Jeff McDonald – vocals, guitar
- Robert Hecker – lead guitar
- Steven McDonald – bass, backing vocals
- Roy McDonald – drums
- Knut "Euroboy" Schreiner – guitar (track 3)
- Anna Waronker – backing vocals (9)

Production

- Steven McDonald – production, mixing
