= Jeff MacDonald =

Jeff or Jeffrey MacDonald or McDonald may refer to:

- Jeff MacDonald, writer of Capitalist Piglet
- Jeff McDonald, American musician, co-founder of the band Redd Kross
- Jeff MacDonald (curler), in the 2012 Courtesy Freight Northern Ontario Superspiel
- Jeffrey R. MacDonald (born 1943), American convicted for the murders of his pregnant wife and two daughters

== See also ==
- Geoff McDonald (disambiguation)
