= Nip Drivers =

American punk rock band

- Origin: Torrance, California, U.S.
- Genres: Hardcore punk, melodic hardcore, pop punk
- Years active: 1980–2000
- Labels: Bemisbrain, Enigma, New Alliance, Taang!, Slope
- Past members: Mike Webber; Kurt Schellenbach; Janus Jones; Nick Passiglia; Pat Hoed; Neal Ogasawara; Paul Jamison; Robert Hanky Jacobson; Adam Gonzales; Jula Bell; Greg Cameron; Dave Wakefield; John McCree

The Nip Drivers were an American punk rock band formed in 1980 in Torrance, California. The band was the brainchild of lead singer Mike Webber, and for a time included guitarist Kurt Schellenbach, Janus Jones on bass, and Nick Passiglia on drums, though the lineup at any given time was fluid. They played fast hardcore punk, often infused with humor and a total lack of political correctness. In addition to their own compositions, they recorded sometimes improbable covers of pop hits such as Olivia Newton-John’s “Have You Never Been Mellow,” Duran Duran's "Rio," and Sweet’s “Fox on the Run”. The last is heard on the soundtrack of the 1984 film Desperate Teenage Lovedolls. The band also made a cameo appearance in the 1985 film Echo Park starring Susan Dey and Tom Hulce.

After a period of inactivity, Webber emerged with an all-new line-up in the 1990s. In 2000, the eighties LP's were reissued on CD. In 1999, Mike started an acoustic project called the Bob Drivers with Jula Bell (Bulimia Banquet) where Mike played acoustic guitar and Jula played punk rock autoharp. The name was a play on Bobsled+Nip Drivers, henceforth, The Bob Drivers. In 2001 Mike emerged with the last Nip Drivers lineup. He used his other band Marc Spitz Freestyle, as the new band. The other members included Jula Bell on bass and backing vocals, Greg Cameron (SWA, October Faction) on drums, and Dave Wakefield (Sukia) on guitar. They recorded four new songs that were due for release in Winter of 2020. Mike Webber died on November 11, 2006. The last show that the Nip Drivers played was at the Liquid Kitty Punk Rock BBQ in West LA August 13, 2006.

== Discography ==
- Destroy Whitey (12" EP, 1984, New Alliance Records)
- Oh Blessed Freak Show (LP, 1985, Bemisbrain/Enigma)
- Nip Drivers (7” EP, 1990, No Reality—this is sometimes referred to as the ‘’Pretty Face’’ EP)
- Dirt My Hole (7” EP, 1995, Fearless)
- Destroy Whitey/Oh Blessed Freak Show (CD reissue, 2000, Taang! Records)

=== Compilation appearances ===
- Party or Go Home (1983, Mystic Records)
  - Includes "Tang"
- Desperate Teenage Lovedolls (1984, Enigma)
  - Includes "Fox on the Run"
- When Men were Men... and Sheep were Scared (1985, Bemisbrain)
  - Includes “Rio” and “E.Y.O.B.”
