= Born Innocent (Redd Kross album) =

Studio album by Red Cross
- Released: 1982
- Genre: Hardcore punk
- Label: Smoke 7 Frontier
- Producer: Red Cross; Felix Alanis

Red Cross chronology
Red Cross (1980)	Born Innocent (1982)	Teen Babes From Monsanto (1984)

Alternate cover art
- 1986 reissue as Redd Kross.

Born Innocent is the first studio album by Red Cross (later known as Redd Kross), released in 1982 on Smoke 7 Records, and re-released in 1986 on Frontier Records featuring different cover art and three bonus tracks taken from the Sudden Death and American Youth Report compilations. The record was produced by Smoke 7 owner, Felix Alanis, who was also the lead singer of RF7.

In 2007 the album was performed live in its entirety as part of the All Tomorrow's Parties-curated Don't Look Back series.

== Music and lyrics ==
The album's lyrics contain references to Charles Manson and actress Linda Blair. The album contains elements of blues.

== Reception ==
Nathan Bush of AllMusic said: "Though subsequent releases found Redd Kross cleaning up their act, this debut captures them in all their youthful glory; documenting the sound of the McDonalds and company unleashed on an unsuspecting set of guitars, bass, and drums."

== Track listing ==
All tracks written by Jeff and Steve McDonald except where noted.

1. "Linda Blair" – 2:04
  - named for the actress Linda Blair, who starred in the 1973 film The Exorcist, as well as starring in the movie that the album was named after.
2. "White Trash" – 1:27
3. "Everyday There's Someone New" – 1:06
4. "Solid Gold" – 1:13
5. "Burn-Out" – 1:24
6. "Charlie" – 1:47
7. "Tatum O'Tot and the Fried Vegetables" – 1:32 [reissue bonus track]
8. "St. Lita Ford Blues" – 3:28 [reissue bonus track]
9. "Self Respect" – 0:42
10. "Pseudo-Intellectual" – 1:12
11. "Kill Someone You Hate" – 1:26
12. "Look on Up at the Bottom" (Stu Phillips) – 2:11
  - cover from Beyond the Valley of the Dolls
13. "Cellulite City" – 1:59
14. "I'm Alright" – 1:57
  - cover of the Rolling Stones cover of Bo Diddley
15. "Cease to Exist" (Charles Manson) – 2:29
  - Charles Manson cover
16. "Notes and Chords Mean Nothing to Me" – 2:24 [reissue bonus track]

== Personnel ==
- Jeff McDonald – lead vocals, rhythm guitar
- Tracy Lea – lead guitar
- Steven Shane McDonald – bass, backing vocals
- John Stielow – drums
