= Show World =

Studio album by Redd Kross
- Released: February 11, 1997
- Recorded: April 1996
- Genre: Alternative rock
- Label: Mercury; This Way Up
- Producer: Redd Kross; Chris Shaw

Redd Kross chronology
Phaseshifter (1993)	Show World (1997)	Researching the Blues (2012)

Professional ratings
Review scores
Source	Rating
AllMusic	3.5/5 stars
The Encyclopedia of Popular Music	4/5 stars
Entertainment Weekly	A
MusicHound Rock: The Essential Album Guide	3.5/5 stars
Pitchfork	7.7/10

Show World is an album by rock band Redd Kross, released in 1997.

Three singles were issued in the UK: "Get Out of Myself", "Mess Around", and "Secret Life". The US promotional singles were "Stoned", "Get Out of Myself", and "Mess Around".

== Critical reception ==
AllMusic called the album "yet more fun from a band who dedicates themselves to a smart good time." Entertainment Weekly wrote that "in the hands of Redd Kross, bubblegum, glam, and old-school Brit pop sound thoroughly modern and, well, absolutely groovy."

== Track listing ==
1. "Pretty Please Me" (cover of song by the Quick)
2. "Stoned"
3. "You Lied Again"
4. "Girl God"
5. "Mess Around"
6. "One Chord Progression"
7. "Teen Competition"
8. "Follow the Leader"
9. "Vanity Mirror"
10. "Secret Life"
11. "Ugly Town"
12. "Get Out of Myself"
13. "Kiss the Goat"
14. "Sick Love" (hidden track)

== Personnel ==
- Vicki Berndt – photography
- Marina Chavez – photography
- Nick DiDia – engineer
- John Ewing, Jr. – engineer
- Gere Fennelly – keyboards
- Brian Kehew – engineer, string arrangements
- Eddie Kurdziel – guitar
- Jeff McDonald – guitar, vocals
- Steve McDonald – bass
- David Nottingham – engineer
- Redd Kross – producer
- Brian Reitzell – percussion, drums
- Steve Rooke – mastering
- Tannis Root – design
- Chris Shaw – producer, engineer, mixing
