= Dave Markey =

American film director (born 1963)

David Markey
- Born: December 3, 1963 (age 62); Burbank, California
- Occupation: Film director

David Markey (born December 3, 1963, in Burbank, California, United States) is an American film director. A self-taught filmmaker and musician, Markey formed his own band, SIN 34, in 1981 as well as Painted Willie in 1984. He also started We Got Power fanzine in 1981 along with Jordan Schwartz. His film credits include Desperate Teenage Lovedolls (1984) and its 1986 sequel Lovedolls Superstar, which were distributed underground. His 1991: The Year Punk Broke, was released in cinemas in the US and Canada. His 2008 documentary The Reinactors was included in international film festivals around the world. The book We Got Power: Hardcore Punk Scenes From 1980's Southern California was released in 2012, featuring photography by Markey and Schwartz. The book's release was timed with a gallery retrospective of the duo's photos entitled "We Survived The Pit" at Track 16 Gallery in Santa Monica.

== Biography ==
As a self-taught filmmaker and musician, David Markey directed, produced, edited, and photographed most of his films, the majority of which have been self-funded. His work is also noted as documenting the punk scene in Southern California throughout the 1980s, growing to find a larger audience in the 1990s while continuing to produce work throughout the 2000s and 2010s. Markey has worked with Sonic Youth, Nirvana, Dinosaur Jr, Mudhoney, Redd Kross, Bob Mould, Circle Jerks, The Ramones, Black Flag, and the Meat Puppets.

Markey made his first film in 1974 at the age of 11 with his father's hand-wound 8mm Brownie camera, cast from the children of his Santa Monica, California neighborhood. He soon discovered the burgeoning LA punk scene a few years later through bands like X, Black Flag, and Redd Kross in 1980. Markey was driven to form his own band, SIN 34, in 1981 as well as Painted Willie in 1984. He also started We Got Power fanzine in 1981 along with Jordan Schwartz, spawning Markey's cinematic Super-8 cult punk scene document The Slog Movie in 1982. Following closely behind was Desperate Teenage Lovedolls (1984) and its 1986 sequel Lovedolls Superstar. These films were distributed underground and critically well-received, putting Markey on the cinematic punk map before he was of legal age. Markey's work has since been exhibited internationally, including theatrical release in the US and Canada of 1991: The Year Punk Broke, followed by a VHS release by the David Geffen Company. In 2011, Universal Music Group re-released the film in the DVD format with an hour plus of bonus material produced by Markey. Theatrical screenings of his work have taken place in Los Angeles, New York, San Francisco, Seattle, Toronto, Tuscan and elsewhere. His 2008 documentary The Reinactors was included in international film festivals in Argentina, England, Scotland, Sweden, Switzerland, Denmark, Portugal, Angola, China, Korea, Italy and The Netherlands.

David Markey has appeared in the documentary films American Hardcore and We Jam Econo. Markey was interviewed for the 20th Century Fox re-release of Russ Meyer's Beyond The Valley Of The Dolls Special Edition DVD in 2006. He played a bouncer in the 2007 film What We Do Is Secret. He is also seen as an uncredited extra in Suburbia (1983) and Girls Just Want To Have Fun (1985).

In October 2012, he became a published author as Bazillion Points released the book We Got Power: Hardcore Punk Scenes From 1980's Southern California, consisting primarily of the photographic work of Markey and his longtime collaborator Jordan Schwartz. The book's release was timed with a gallery retrospective of the duo's photos from the early 1980s to the early 1990s entitled "We Survived The Pit" at Track 16 Gallery in Santa Monica, blocks away from where Markey and Schwartz grew up.

== Critical reception ==
Of the book, We Got Power: Hardcore Punk Scenes From 1980's Southern California, the LA Times called it " an essential addition to the history of a movement".

== Filmography (as director) ==
- The Secret Lives of Bill Bartell (2025)
- My Career As A Jerk (2012)
- Dinosaur Jr. - Bug Live At 9:30 Club (2012)
- The Reinactors (2008)
- Cut Shorts (2006)
- (This Is Known as) The Blues Scale (2004)
- Corporate Ghost: The Videos: 1990-2002 (2004)
- Blast Off! (1997)
- 1991: The Year Punk Broke (1992)
- Reality 86'd (1991)
- Citizen Tania (1989)
- Macaroni & Me (1988)
- Lovedolls Superstar (1986)
- Desperate Teenage Lovedolls (1984)
- The Slog Movie (1982)
- The Ominous (1980)

== Music video filmography ==
- SIN 34 - Trip to San Francisco - SIN 34 (1982)
- "Slip It In" - Black Flag (1984)
- "Upsidedowntown" - Painted Willie (1987)
- "Macbeth" - Ciccone Youth (1988)
- "Down With the Bass"' - Firehose (1990)
- "Mildred Pierce" - Sonic Youth (1990)
- "Cinderella's Big Score" - Sonic Youth (1990)
- "Redd Kross" - Shonen Knife (1991)
- "Fuzz Gun '91" - Mudhoney (1991)
- "Who You Drivin' Now?" - Mudhoney (1991)
- "Sunshine of Your Love" - Fudge Tunnel (1991)
- "Innocent X" - Pat Smear (1992)
- "Curse Me" - Bulimia Banquet (1992)
- "Accelerator" - Gumball (1993)
- "Lucky Guy" - The Muffs (1993)
- "The Damage Done" - Gumball (1994)
- "Revolution on the Rocks" - Gumball (1994)
- "Superstar" - Sonic Youth (1994)
- "Scum" - Meat Puppets (1995)
- "Ono Soul" - Thurston Moore (1995)
- "The Diamond Sea" - Sonic Youth (1995) contributor
- "Ritchie Dagger's Crime" - The Posies (1996)
- "Explosion!" - Shonen Knife (1997)
- "Everything's Wonderful" - Abby Travis (2000)
- "Alaska" - Eyes Adrift (2002)
- "I Love You Golden Blue" - Sonic Youth (2004)
- "Rotten Shame" - Meat Puppets 2009
- "Stay Away From Downtown" - Redd Kross (2012)
- "Funny" - The Black Lips (2014)
- "The War" - Bob Mould (2014)
- "Doors and Fours" - Nofx (2020)
