= Jason Mars =

American computer scientist

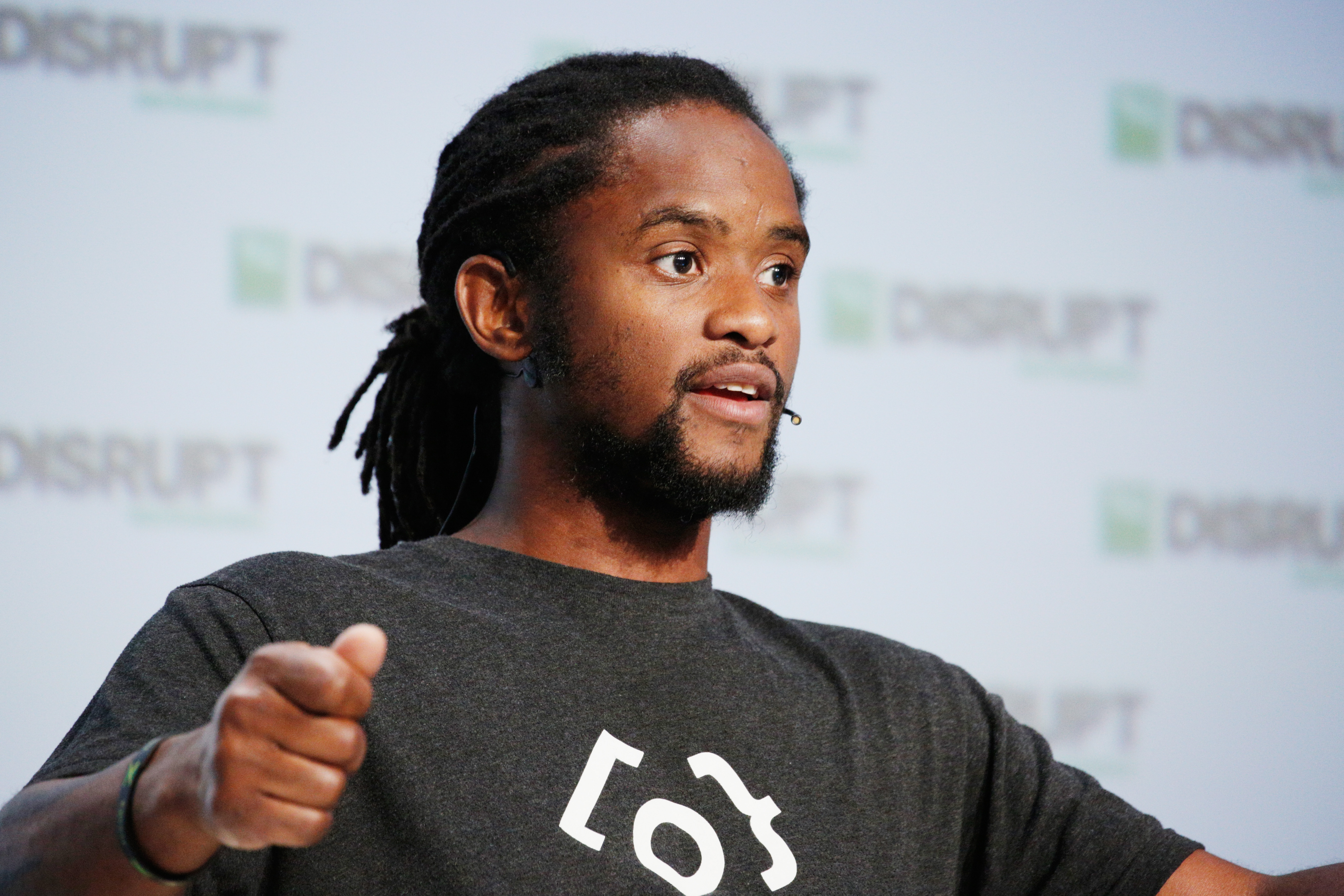
- Jason Mars
- Born: May 27, 1983 (age 43); US
- Education: University of Virginia; University of Pittsburgh
- Known for: computer architecture and artificial intelligence
- Spouse: Lingjia Tang
- Awards: CARAH Vanguard Award by the Institute of Caribbean Studies (2021) Bank Innovations #2 Most Innovative CEO in Banking (2017); Crain’s Detroit Business’ 40 under 40 (2019)
- Scientific career
- Fields: Computer science
- Workplaces: University of Michigan
- Doctoral advisor: Mary Lou Soffa
- Website: jasonmars.org

Jason O. Mars (born May 27, 1983) is an American computer scientist, author, and entrepreneur. He is best known for his research into computer architecture and artificial intelligence, particularly in the design and deployment of conversational AI. The best-selling author of Breaking Bots: Inventing a New Voice in the AI Revolution, he has been involved in multiple AI initiatives and startups over the course of his career, including ZeroShotBot, Jaseci, Clinc, Myca, and ImpactfulAI.

Mars holds a PhD in computer science from the University of Virginia(UVA), and is currently employed as an associate professor of computer science and engineering at the University of Michigan(U-M). He is also acting co-director of U-M's Clarity Lab alongside his wife, Professor Lingjia Tang. There, Mars helps direct advanced research within artificial intelligence, large-scale computing, and coding. Among the lab's most notable projects is the open source Sirius, later rebranded as Lucida.

A virtual assistant capable of understanding both visual and auditory queries, Lucida was intended by Mars and his colleagues as a sandbox that would help programmers explore the complexities of speech recognition. Mars also hoped that it would act as a foundation for the development of hardware better-suited for conversational AI. The project was supported by Google, the Defense Advanced Research Projects Agency (DARPA), and the National Science Foundation.

Jason Mars was one of ten individuals celebrated at the 28th Annual Caribbean American Heritage (CARAH) Awards. Mars received the Vanguard Award from the Institute of Caribbean Studies for his technological impact and "contributions to America and the world." Other winners include Pfizer Principal Scientist for Viral Vaccines Vidia Roopchand and Grammy-winning songwriter Gordon Chambers. Past honorees of the CARAH Awards include former United States attorney general Eric Holder, former United States ambassador to the United Nations Andrew Young and Olympian Usain Bolt.

== Early life ==
=== Childhood and family ===
His father, Pairadeau "Perry" Mars, held a master's degree in international affairs and a Ph.D. in political science.

By his own admission, Mars was often viewed as the "black sheep" of the family. Growing up, he had little interest in academia, instead wanting to do nothing more than code. His brother, Pairadeau Mars Jr., on the other hand, was frequently viewed as a genius, receiving an above-average score on the SAT in eighth grade.

Mars would later be diagnosed with Attention Deficit Hyperactivity Disorder (ADHD).

Mars was thirteen when he first discovered his love of programming. At the time an avid gamer, he was fascinated by the knowledge that there were programs that would allow him to edit the base code of his games. He taught himself everything he could about C++, and created his first AI when he was a high school freshman.

This would eventually lead Mars into the world of hacking and hacker culture. At one point in middle school, he received a suspension for infecting the school's computer network with a virus. When he inadvertently bricked his own computer via the same virus, he taught himself how to repair it.

=== Education ===
Mars attended Southfield High in South Michigan, a school in the bottom-third percentile of high schools in the United States. A quiet loner, Mars found himself frustrated at both the school's discouragement of higher learning and his own disinterest in his studies. He felt that he was wasting his time and his potential, and wanted to drop out on more than one occasion.

In 2002, Mars attended the University of Pittsburgh to study computer science. For the first two years, he found himself just as bored as he was in high school. He skipped nearly half his programming lectures, and didn't bother studying for his exams.

During his sophomore year, Mars met Professor Mary Lou Soffa, who invited him to join her research group. Mars says this ultimately inspired him to pursue a career in research. In 2006, he began attending the University of Virginia, and obtained his PhD in 2012.

== Business career ==
=== Google ===
While pursuing his PhD, Mars also worked as a graduate research intern at Google's Mountain View location. From 2008 to 2011, he contributed to the design and prototyping of multiple algorithms and projects. He also co-authored several research papers which received accolades including:

- Excellent Papers from 2011
- HPCA 2012 Best Papers from Computer Architecture
- IEEE 2011 Top Picks
- CGO 2012 Best Paper Award

Mars also worked as a visiting scientist in 2013, where he performed research into improving the efficiency of Google's backend infrastructure.

=== Intel ===
In Summer 2011, Mars worked as a research intern at Intel Labs in Santa Clara, California. He returned in Summer 2012 as a research scholar. During this time, he helped design and prototype more power-efficient processors.

=== Clinc ===
In 2015, Mars along with wife and colleague Tang, and a team of student researchers founded Clinc. Based in Ann Arbor, Michigan, Clinc built upon the team's previous work with Lucida. By that point, the platform had received inquiries from industries such as finance, automotive, and healthcare for industry-specific AI.

Clinc received $1.2 million in seed funding in March 2016, led by eLab Ventures and with participation from Cahoots Holdings and Hyde Park Venture Partners. In June 2016, it also received a $225,000 grant from the National Science Foundation. This would later be expanded to $750,000 in 2017.

According to Mars, Clinc's core mission involves the application of AI science to solving meaningful, substantial problems in people's daily lives. It launched Finie, its first official product, in 2016. An intelligent personal finance assistant composed of five separate purpose-built AI engines, Finie was marketed as "a Siri for your bank account."

In 2017, Clinc raised an additional $6.3 million in series A funding, which it used to hire new staff and further invest in its product. It raised another $52 million in Series B funding in 2019, making it one of the highest-funded AI startups of the year and valuing the business at $200 million By this point, the company had achieved 300% revenue growth year-over-year since it was founded.

Additionally, in 2017, Mars was nominated as the second most innovative CEO in banking, alongside notable names that included PayPal's Dan Schulman, Clarity Money's Adam Dell, JPMorgan Chase's Jamie Dimon, and more.

Mars resigned from his position as Clinc CEO in 2020 in the wake of employee allegations of inappropriate behavior. Mars did not however go on leave from his appointment at University of Michigan though some of his colleagues called on him to take a leave of absence from teaching. There was also reports of student protests online in late 2020.

=== Jaseci ===
Drawing on the five years he spent at Clinc, Mars concluded that existing computational and programming models were "ill-suited for the emerging set of problems in the AI sphere."

He further concluded that the solution lay in taking a different approach to how computational models operate. He believed that rather than working in isolation from one another, AI systems should instead leverage collective intelligence. With this in mind, Mars in 2021 developed a new computational model, Jaseci, and a programming language to support it, known as Jac. Based on this technology Mars has created a number of products and companies including ZeroShotBot, TrueSelph, and Myca.

== Personal life ==
Mars met his wife, Lingjia Tang, while attending the University of Virginia. At the time he encouraged her to join Professor Soffa's research lab. Mars and Tang have worked together ever since.

== Other activities ==
=== TEDx ===
In April 2020, Mars participated in a TEDx Talk titled "Why conversational AI is taking over our world" hosted at an independently organized TEDx event. Over the course of the keynote, he gave his insights on the current state of artificial intelligence, and detailed what he feels are the reasons behind the popularity of conversational AI.

=== Breaking Bots ===
Published on March 16, 2021, by ForbesBooks, Breaking Bots: Inventing A New Voice In The AI Revolution is an autobiographical work recounting Mars's professional career alongside his insights on the "past, present, and future of AI." In May, it was listed as an Amazon #1 bestseller in both "Artificial Intelligence & Semantics" and "Computer & Technology Biographies."

== Awards and honors ==
- In 2010, Mars was awarded the Google Fellowship in Computer Technology.
- In 2017, Mars was named Bank Innovations' #2 Most Innovative CEO in Banking.
- In 2019, Mars appeared alongside Tang in Crain's Detroit Business 40 under 40.
- In 2020, Mars was inducted into the IEEE/ACM MICRO Hall of Fame.
- Mars is currently inducted into the ISCA Hall of Fame.
- Research briefs authored and co-authored by Mars have been cited over 6100 times.
