= Teen Babes from Monsanto =

EP by Redd Kross
- Released: 1984
- Studio: Kitchen Sync
- Genre: Punk rock; power pop
- Length: 21:36
- Language: English
- Label: Gasatanka
- Producer: Geza X Redd Kross

Redd Kross chronology
Born Innocent (1982)	Teen Babes from Monsanto (1984)	Neurotica (1987)

Professional ratings
Review scores
Source	Rating
AllMusic	4.5/5 stars
Spin Alternative Record Guide	6/10

Teen Babes from Monsanto is an EP of cover songs released by American rock band Redd Kross.

== Release ==
Teen Babes from Monsanto was released in 1984 on Gasatanka Records and Filmworks, on 12-inch vinyl disc (Note: Gasatanka #E-1110. Marketed by Enigma Records.) and Compact Cassette. (Note: Restless #71110-4. Marketed by Restless Records.)

It was their first release after changing their name from Red Cross to Redd Kross due to a threatened lawsuit from the International Red Cross.

== Critical reception ==
AllMusic critic John Dougan said of the album, "The title says it all. Speedy, sloppy pop loaded with fuzzed-up guitars and whiny vocals. Mostly covers (Stooges, Kiss, Bowie), it's a great little statement of purpose from these '70s hard-rock babes-turned-adults."

== Reissues ==
All seven songs were included on the Insipid Vinyl label compilation CD Trance: Australian Tour 1992, released in 1992. (Note: Insipid #IV-11)

In June 2015, the record was reissued as a full-length LP under the title Teen Babes from Monsanto: Versión Especial, (Note: Unlabeled self-release #RK-01) (Note: Spanish for "Special Version".) a numbered limited edition of 250 copies, self-released by the band to commemorate the record's 31st anniversary, featuring three bonus cover versions and alternate double-fronted cover art designed by Jonathan Krop.

== Track listing ==
Side A
No.	Title	Writer(s)	Length
1.	"Deuce" (Kiss cover)	Gene Simmons	3:04
2.	"Citadel" (The Rolling Stones cover)	Mick Jagger, Keith Richards	2:52
3.	"Heaven Only Knows" (The Shangri-Las cover)	Ellie Greenwich, Jeff Barry	2:05
4.	"Ann" (The Stooges cover)	The Stooges	2:56

Side B
No.	Title	Writer(s)	Length
1.	"Savior Machine" (David Bowie cover)	David Bowie	4:05
2.	"Blow You a Kiss in the Wind" (Elizabeth Montgomery's version cover (Note: A cover version of the song "I'll Blow You a Kiss in the Wind" (aka "I'm Gonna Blow You a Kiss in the Wind"), written by Tommy Boyce and Bobby Hart, as it was performed by Elizabeth Montgomery, as Serena, in the Bewitched episode "Serena Stops the Show", aired on February 19, 1970.))	Boyce and Hart	2:03
3.	"Linda Blair 1984"	Jeff McDonald	4:31
Total length:			21:36

=== 2015: Versión Especial ===
Side A
No.	Title	Writer(s)	Length
1.	"Deuce" (Kiss cover)		3:04
2.	"Citadel" (The Rolling Stones cover)		2:52
3.	"Heaven Only Knows" (The Shangri-Las cover)		2:05
4.	"I'll Meet You Halfway" (The Partridge Family cover)	Wes Farrell, Gerry Goffin
5.	"Ann" (The Stooges cover)		2:56

Side B
No.	Title	Writer(s)	Length
1.	"It Won't Be Long" (The Beatles cover; arrangement by The Quick)	John Lennon, Paul McCartney
2.	"Fancy" (The Kinks cover)	Ray Davies
3.	"Savior Machine" (David Bowie cover)		4:05
4.	"Blow You a Kiss in the Wind" (Elizabeth Montgomery's version cover)		2:03
5.	"Linda Blair 1984"		4:31

== Personnel ==
- Jeff McDonald – guitars, lead vocals
- Steven McDonald – fuzz bass and lead bass, backing vocals
- Dave Peterson – drums, piano
- Bruce Duff – Guitar solo on "Deuce"
- Sid Griffin – Harmonica on "Blow You a Kiss in the Wind"
