= Steven Shane McDonald =

American musician

Steven McDonald
- Steven McDonald performing in 2023

Background information
- Born: Steven Shane McDonald; May 24, 1967 (age 59); Hawthorne, California, U.S.
- Origin: Los Angeles
- Genres: Alternative rock; hard rock; hardcore punk; heavy metal
- Occupations: Musician; record producer
- Years active: 1978–present
- Labels: Frontier; Big Time; Vice

Steven Shane McDonald (born May 24, 1967) is an American rock musician, best known as the bass guitarist in the Los Angeles alternative rock/power pop band Redd Kross. He is a founding member of the hardcore punk band OFF! – serving as a member from 2009 to 2021 – as well as bassist for Melvins since 2016. McDonald has appeared in numerous film projects with his older brother Jeff McDonald, including the 1984 film Desperate Teenage Lovedolls and its sequel Lovedolls Superstar; and the 1990 film Spirit of '76.

== Career ==
Steven McDonald began his career in 1978, when he and his brother Jeff were 11 and 14 respectively. During those times, they lived in Hawthorne, California and were discovering underground music through Creem and Rock Scene magazines. Their real inspiration for the punk rock music began with Black Flag. Despite their age, The Flag added them to their member list. Soon after, they formed a band Redd Kross and performed their first show titled "Red Cross" at the eighth-grade graduation of one of their classmates.

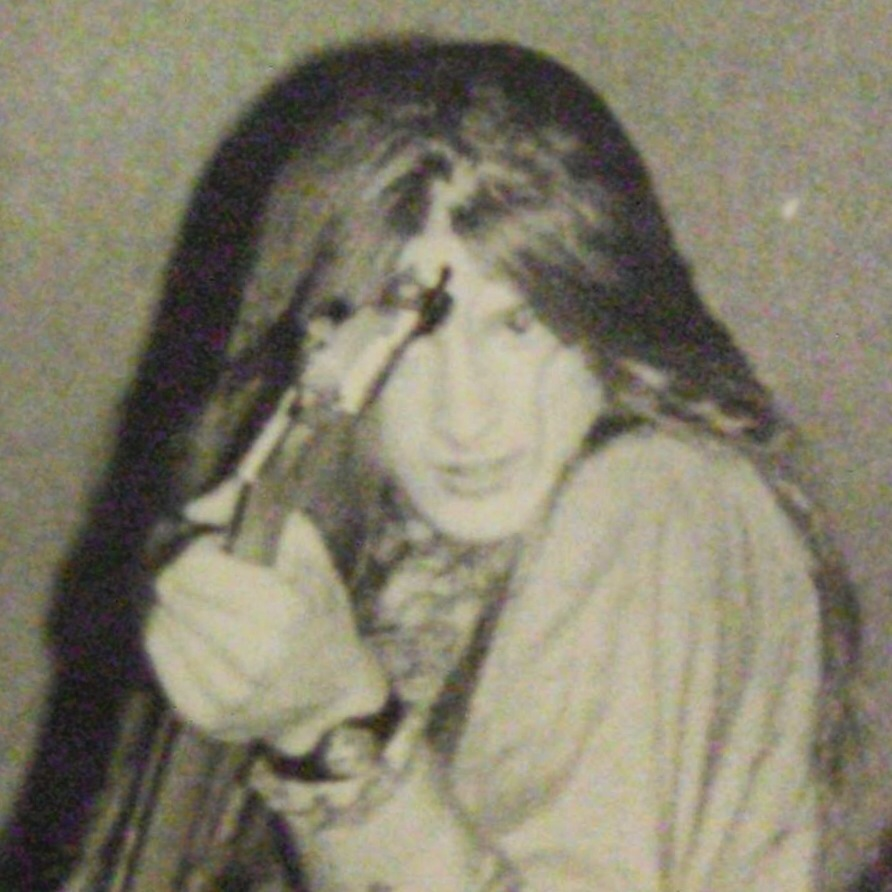
McDonald in 1987

McDonald produced an album by The Format, Dog Problems, on which he played bass and sang backup vocals on a few tracks. He later produced, engineered, and mixed fun.'s debut album, Aim and Ignite, as well as performing as a bassist and backup vocalist on some of the songs. He was also one of the various band members on the original Tenacious D album, along with Dave Grohl; keyboardist Page McConnell of Phish; guitarist Warren Fitzgerald with band frontmen Jack Black and Kyle Gass. He appeared with Tenacious D on MADtv playing "Lee" and "Tribute". McDonald also featured briefly on bass in Kyle Gass' side-project Trainwreck in 2002 and 2003, under the pseudonym "Slim Watkins", before being succeeded by John Spiker.

In the summer of 2002 he became so excited about The White Stripes' new album, White Blood Cells, that he recorded bass lines to two songs of the typically bass-less duo's work. The New York Times, Entertainment Weekly and other outlets reported on it and due to overwhelming demand he added bass to all of the songs, posted the new creation online, and allowed people to download the tracks for free. He called it an art project named Redd Blood Cells which reached a peak of 60,000 downloads in a single day, causing the server to crash from the traffic.

In 2006, McDonald joined Sparks on tour in support of their album Hello Young Lovers. His first collaboration with Sparks was during the 2004 Meltdown Festival in London, curated by Morrissey, where Sparks were invited to play the complete albums "Kimono My House" (1974) and "Lil' Beethoven" (2002). Wilson also played on the 2006 album "Hello Young Lovers".

In 2015, it was announced that McDonald would be joining the Melvins. He recorded four songs with the band, which were first released on the limited edition EP War Pussy and later included on the album Basses Loaded. Their first full release with McDonald, a double album titled A Walk with Love & Death, was released on July 7, 2017.

McDonald co-wrote "Embrace the Rub" with his wife Anna Waronker of that dog. and Josh Klinghoffer of the Red Hot Chili Peppers.

== Personal life ==
Steven is married to that dog. vocalist Anna Waronker.

== Partial discography ==
=== Redd Kross ===
- Red Cross (1980; EP)
- Born Innocent (1982)
- Teen Babes from Monsanto (1984; EP)
- Neurotica (1987)
- Third Eye (1990)
- Phaseshifter (1993)
- Show World (1997)
- Researching the Blues (2012)
- Beyond the Door (2019)
- Redd Kross AKA The Redd Album (2024)

=== OFF! ===
- First Four EPs (2010)
- OFF! (2012)
- Wasted Years (2014)

=== Melvins ===
- Basses Loaded (2016; select songs)
- A Walk with Love & Death (2017)
- Steven McDonald (2017; solo EP)
- Pinkus Abortion Technician (2018)
- Five Legged Dog (2021)
- Bad Mood Rising (2022)
- Tarantula Heart (2024)
