= Desperate Teenage Lovedolls =

- Directed by: David Markey
- Starring: Janet Housden; Jennifer Schwartz; Steven McDonald; Jeff McDonald; Hilary Rubens
- Cinematography: David Markey
- Music by: Redd Kross; Nip Drivers; Black Flag; Greg Graffin and Greg Hetson; White Flag; SIN 34; Bags; Darkside
- Release date: 1984
- Running time: 60 min.
- Language: English
- Budget: ~US$250 plus bus fare (estimated)

Desperate Teenage Lovedolls is a 1984 low budget underground film, shot on super-8 film by David Markey, about a rock band of teenage runaways. The film was released on DVD in 2003. A sequel, Lovedolls Superstar, was released in 1986.

== Plot ==
Two girls rediscover their love for playing rock, find a drummer and begin practicing. When one of their mothers intervenes, they run away from home and are forced to fend for themselves on the streets against gangs and rival bands. Soon they are discovered and taken under the wing of rock manager Johnny Tremaine (played by Steven McDonald) who uses them for sex and his own aspirations of wealth. The Love Dolls set out to get revenge on those who have wronged them, and rise to the top of the rock world.

== DVD release ==
In 2003, the film was released in extended DVD format as Desperate Teenage Lovedolls (20th anniversary edition).

== See also ==
- Desperate Teenage Lovedolls (soundtrack)
- Lovedolls Superstar (film)
- Lovedolls Superstar (soundtrack)
