= Lovedolls Superstar (film) =

- 2006 reissue
- Directed by: David Markey
- Written by: David Markey, Jennifer Schwartz, Jeff McDonald, Steven McDonald
- Produced by: David Markey, Jordan Schwartz
- Starring: Jennifer Schwartz; Steven McDonald; Janet Housden; Kim Pilkington; Jeff McDonald; Tracy Lea; Michael F. Glass
- Cinematography: David Markey
- Music by: Redd Kross; Love Dolls; Black Flag; Annette; Gone; Sonic Youth; Painted Willie; Lawndale; Anarchy 6 Meat Puppets; Dead Kennedys
- Distributed by: Eclectic DVD Distribution (a USA-based distributor)
- Release date: 1986
- Running time: 81 min.
- Language: English
- Budget: ~US$10,000 (estimated)

Lovedolls Superstar is a 1986 low budget underground film, shot on super-8 film.

It is the direct sequel to 1984's Desperate Teenage Lovedolls. It was made on a budget of approximately $10,000. The film was reissued on DVD in 2006 as Lovedolls Superstar Fully Realized (a certified directors cut).

Steven Pulchaski of Shock Cinema Magazine described the film as "one of the greatest music industry movies of the last decade".

== Plot ==
The Lovedolls return from their untimely demise in this sequel to the Super-8 film Desperate Teenage Lovedolls (1984). Patch Kelley (Janet Housden) becomes Patch Christ, the leader of an acid-damaged religious cult who rescues has-been Kitty Karryall (Jennifer Schwartz) from a boozy, wasted life. Once reunited, they recruit Sunset Boulevard hooker Alexandria "Cheetah" Axethrasher (Kim Pilkington) to replace the recently murdered Bunny Tremelo (Hilary Rubens). Rainbow Tramaine (Steve McDonald), from the Freedom School in New Mexico ventures to Hollywood to discover his twin brother Johnny has committed suicide after taking The Lovedolls to the top, as their manager.

The She Devils leader Tanya Hearst's mother, Patricia Ann Cloverfield (Tracy Lea) is back in town to even the score. Meanwhile, obsessed fanatic Carl Celery (Jeff McDonald) lives in his own world of Lovedoll worship, only to carry out an assassination of Brews Springstien (Jordan Schwartz). With special guest appearances by Vicki Peterson (Bangles), Jello Biafra (Dead Kennedys) & Sky Saxon (The Seeds).

== Cast ==
- Jennifer Schwartz as Kitty Karryall
- Steven McDonald as Rainbow Tremaine
- Janet Housden as Patch Kelley
- Kim Pilkington as Alexandria "Cheetah" Axethrasher
- Jeff McDonald as Carl Celery
- Tracy Lea as Patricia Ann Cloverfield
- Jordan Schwartz as Brews Springstien
- Michael F. Glass

Featuring

- Vicki Peterson
- Sky Saxon
- Jello Biafra

== Soundtrack ==
An accompanying soundtrack was released on SST Records, with music by Redd Kross, Love Dolls (the girls in the movie singing and backed by Redd Kross), Sonic Youth, Meat Puppets, Dead Kennedys, Gone, Black Flag, Annette, Painted Willie, Lawndale, and Anarchy 6.

== DVD release ==
In 2006, the film was released in extended DVD format as "Lovedolls Superstar Fully Realized".
