= Redd Kross =

American alternative rock band

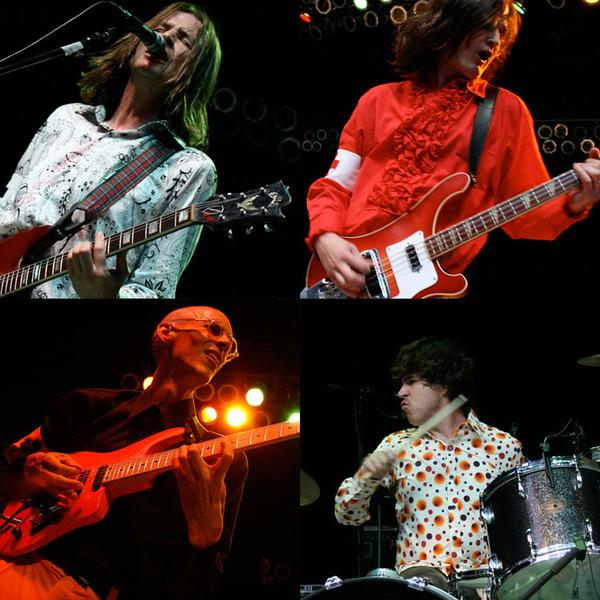
- Redd Kross in 2007

Background information
- Also known as: The Tourists; Red Cross
- Origin: Hawthorne, California, U.S.
- Genres: Alternative rock; power pop; punk rock; pop punk
- Years active: 1980–1997; 2004–present
- Members: Jeff McDonald; Steve McDonald; Jason Shapiro; Dale Crover
- Past members: Dez Cadena; Gere Fennelly; Robert Hecker; Greg Hetson; Janet Housden; Victor Indrizzo; Jack Irons; Eddie Kurdziel; Tracy Lea; Chett Lehrer; Roy McDonald; Dave Peterson; Vicki Peterson; Brian Reitzell; Ron Reyes; Eric Skodis; John Stielow
- Website: https://reddkross.com

Redd Kross is an American rock band from Hawthorne, California, who had their roots in 1978 in a punk rock band called the Tourists, which was started by brothers Jeff and Steve McDonald while Steve was still in middle school. With the addition of friends Greg Hetson on guitar and John Stielow on drums, the band's first gig was opening for Black Flag. The band changed their name to Red Cross in 1979, and in 1982 changed the spelling due to threatened legal action by the charitable organization International Red Cross. The band has since released eight albums and three EPs. Their style was originally hardcore punk, but they have since branched out to touch on various rock and roll styles.

== Career ==
=== Red Cross ===
In April 1979, the band had their first practice in the living room of original drummer, John Stielow's parent's home. They eventually changed the band name to Red Cross, which was allegedly inspired by the masturbation scene in the film The Exorcist. They soon began working on their 1980 debut self-titled EP. Eventually, Hetson left to join the Circle Jerks (and later Bad Religion) and Reyes left for Black Flag. They appeared on the Posh Boy compilation The Siren, and then to complete the lineup on their first full-length album, Born Innocent, they assembled a revolving door of musicians including original drummer John Stielow. Full of the brothers' pop culture obsessions, Born Innocent featured odes to Linda Blair (who starred in a television movie of the same name), a cover of "Look on Up at the Bottom" by the Carrie Nations from Beyond the Valley of the Dolls, and Charles Manson (whose song "Cease to Exist" they covered). The album also contains nods to Jim and Tammy Faye Bakker, Tatum O'Neal, and Lita Ford. Not long after the release of the album, the group was threatened with a lawsuit from the International Red Cross and changed the spelling of their name to Redd Kross.

=== Redd Kross ===
In 1984, Redd Kross returned with drummer Dave Peterson to record Teen Babes from Monsanto, an album featuring covers. Later that year, lead guitarist Robert Hecker joined the band, as they embarked on tour in support of Teen Babes from Monsanto. In that same year, they were featured on the soundtrack of Desperate Teenage Lovedolls with their cover of the Brady Bunch Kids' "It's a Sunshine Day".

In 1987, Redd Kross released Neurotica.

=== 1990s ===
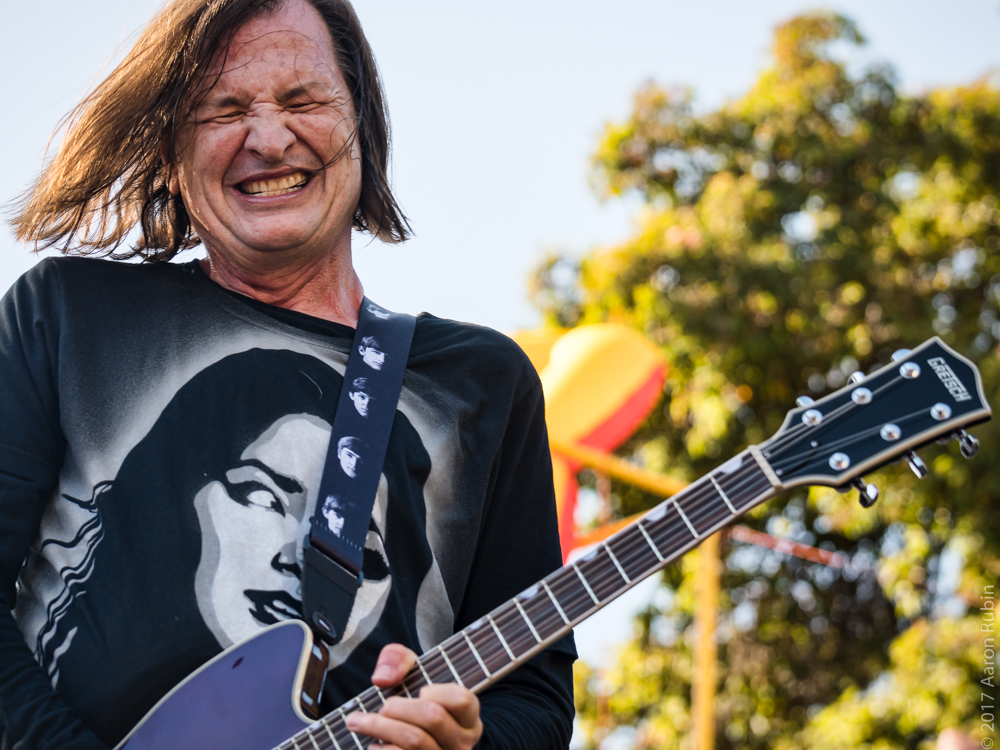
Jeff McDonald at Burger Boogaloo, Mosswood Park, Oakland, California, 2017

On February 20, 1990, Redd Kross appeared on Episode 2 of the cult Public-access television show "Decoupage" with Summer Caprice.

In 1990, Redd Kross signed with Atlantic Records, releasing Third Eye, and appeared with David Cassidy in the film Spirit of '76, and issued several singles, including "Annie's Gone", which had some mild success on college radio.

The album Phaseshifter was released in 1993, with new band members Eddie Kurdziel, Gere Fennelly, and Brian Reitzell. The videos for "Jimmy's Fantasy" and "Lady In The Front Row" were both shown on MTV's 120 Minutes. They toured on Phaseshifter for over a year, headlining their own shows as well as tours supporting The Lemonheads and The Spin Doctors in late 1993 and Stone Temple Pilots in 1994.

In 1997, Redd Kross released Show World, produced by Chris Shaw (who also produced albums for Weezer and Soul Asylum) and toured supporting The Presidents of the United States of America. The band took an indefinite hiatus after the Show World tour, and their future was uncertain after the death of guitarist Eddie Kurdziel on June 6, 1999.

=== 2010s ===
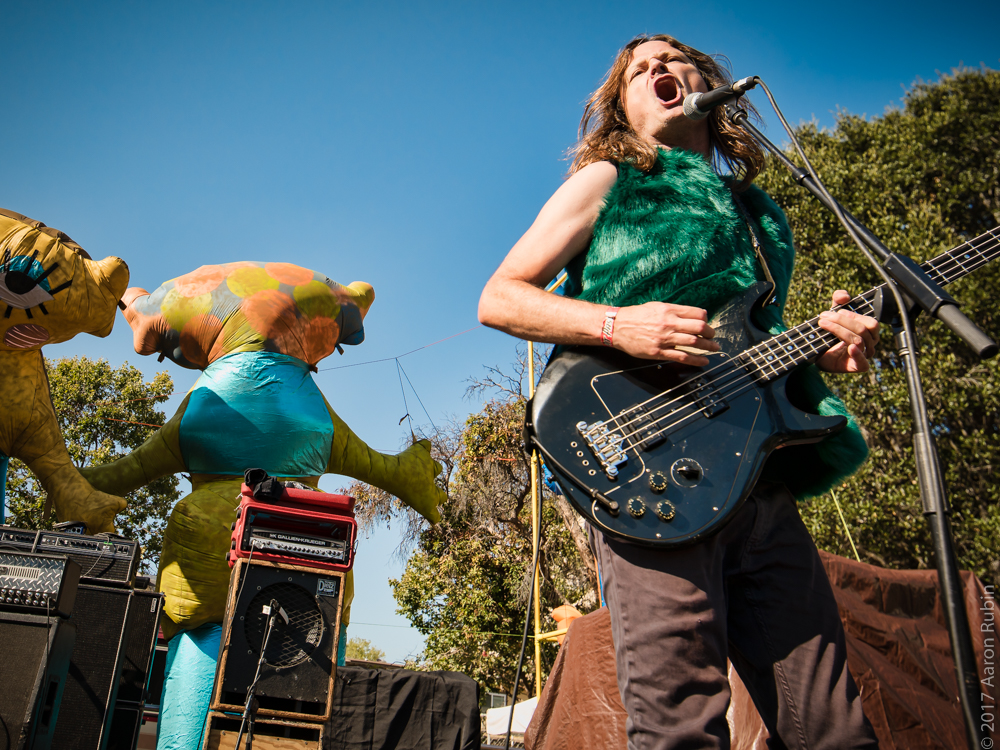
Steve McDonald of Redd Kross at Burger Boogaloo, Mosswood Park, Oakland, California, 2017

In 2019, Emmy Award–winning television comedy writer Andrew Reich, best known as an Executive Producer on Friends, was directing a documentary on the band called Born Innocent: The Redd Kross Story.

Dale Crover joined Redd Kross on drums fulltime.

=== 2020s ===
On June 26, 2020, the band reissued their debut EP on Merge Records.

Steven McDonald and Redd Kross were included in a feature article for the 25th anniversary of TapeOp magazine.

The documentary Born Innocent: The Redd Kross Story received its Los Angeles premiere at the Don't Knock the Rock Festival on May 23, 2024.

On June 28, 2024, Redd Kross released its eighth studio album, a self-titled double album, featuring singles "Candy Coloured Catastrophe" and "Too Good to Be True."

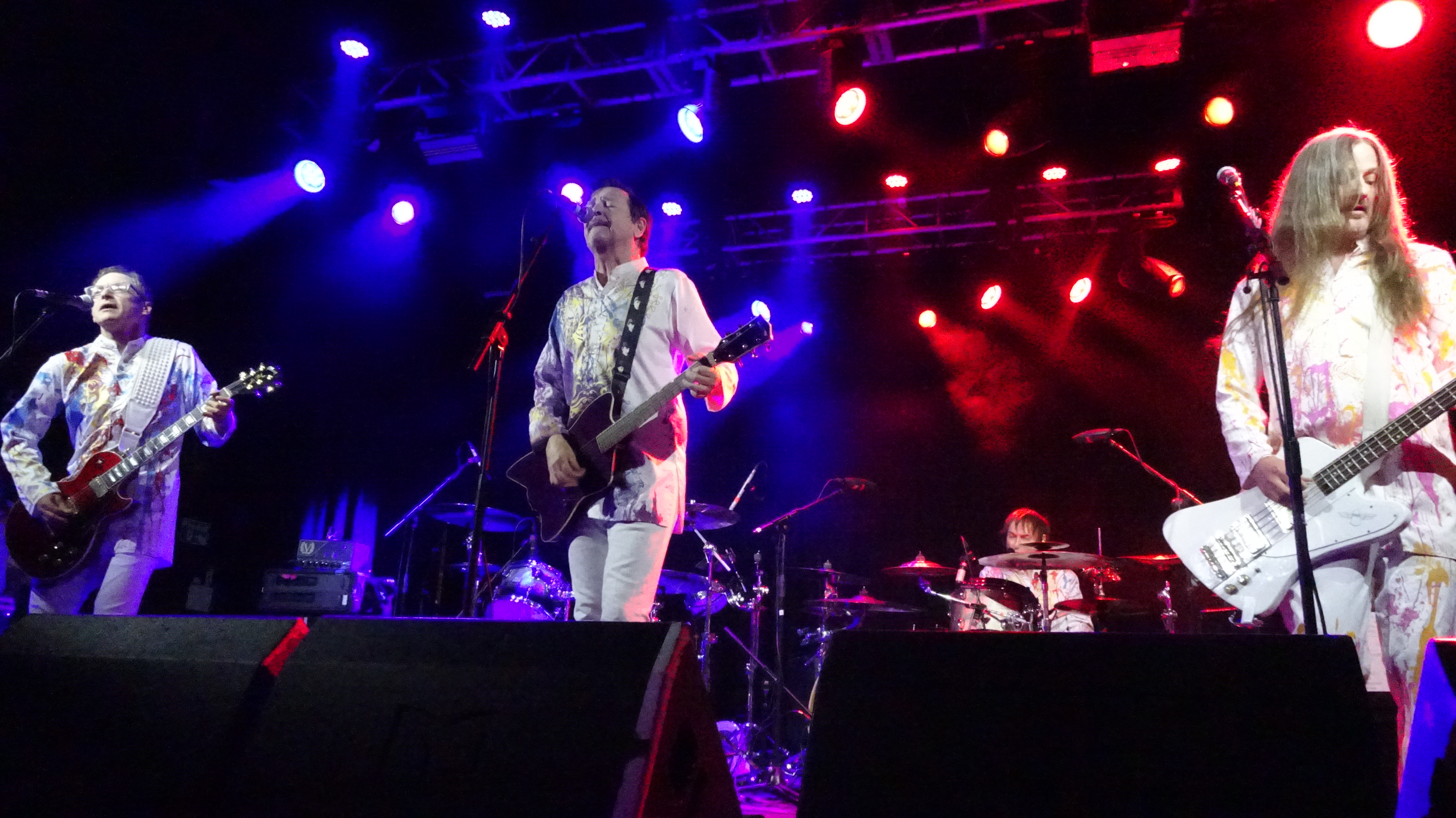
Redd Kross at Electric Ballroom, London (August 12, 2025)

The brothers released a memoir, Now You’re One of Us: The Incredible Story of Redd Kross, in October 2024, co-written with Dan Epstein and published by Omnibus Press.

== Musical style and influences ==
Redd Kross is considered a power pop band. AllMusic states that Red Kross's music represents an intersection between punk rock, heavy metal and bubblegum music. The band's early material was rooted in punk, while later releases took a more accessible direction. Other styles explored by the band include pop metal and post-grunge. AllMusic compared the band's melodies to those of the Beatles. Additionally, the band is known for its affinity towards the popular culture of the 1970s.

== Side projects ==
The McDonald brothers collaborated with Astrid McDonald (Jeff's daughter with wife Charlotte Caffey, guitarist for The Go-Go's) and Anna Waronker (Steve's wife, frontwoman of That Dog) on a side project. Performing as Ze Malibu Kids, they released the album Sound It Out in 2002.

Both McDonald brothers appeared with David Cassidy in the comedy film The Spirit of '76.

== Soundtracks ==
Redd Kross songs appear on the soundtracks to Desperate Teenage Lovedolls, Good Burger, PCU, Bordello of Blood, An American Werewolf in Paris, and Varsity Blues.

Their song "1976" plays over the end credits of the 1990 movie Spirit of '76. They contributed the song "It's a Scream" for the 2000 film Shriek If You Know What I Did Last Friday The Thirteenth but the soundtrack was never released and the song itself wasn't heard until it appeared on Hot Issue in 2016. The song "Uglier" was licensed and used in the film Hits by David Cross.

== Discography ==
=== Albums ===
List of studio albums, with selected chart positions
Title	Year	Label	Peak chart positions
Title	Year	Label	AUS
Born Innocent	1982	Smoke 7/Frontier	—
Neurotica	1987	Big Time	—
Third Eye	1990	Atlantic	—
Phaseshifter	1993	This Way Up	99
Show World	1997	Mercury/This Way Up	—
Researching the Blues	2012	Merge	—
Beyond the Door	2019	Merge	—
Redd Kross AKA The Redd Album	2024	In the Red Records	—

=== EPs ===
- Red Cross (Posh Boy) (1980)
- Teen Babes from Monsanto (Gasatanka) (1984)
- 2500 Redd Kross Fans Can't Be Wrong (Sympathy for the Record Industry) (1993)

=== Compilations ===
- Hot Issue (Redd Kross Fashion Records) (2016)
- Oh Canada! Hot Issue Vol. 2: Show World Tour Live (Redd Kross Fashion Records) (2016)

=== DVDs ===
- Got Live If You Must (Bittersweet)(2008)
- A History Lesson Part 1 - Independent (2010)

=== Singles ===
Year	Title	Chart positions			Album
Year	Title	US Modern Rock	AUS	UK	Album
1990	"Annie's Gone"	16	—	—	Third Eye
1992	"Trance"	—	178	—	-
1993	"Switchblade Sister"	—	—	—	-
1993	"Jimmy's Fantasy"	—	133	—	Phaseshifter
1993	"Lady in the Front Row"	—	97	—	Phaseshifter
1994	"Visionary"	—	—	75	Phaseshifter
1994	"Yesterday Once More"	—	84	45	If I Were a Carpenter
1997	"Get Out Of Myself"	—	—	63	Show World
1997	"Mess Around"	—	—	84	Show World
1997	"Secret Life"	—	—	95	Show World

=== Compilation appearances ===
- The Siren (Posh Boy) (1980)
  - Includes the entire Red Cross EP
- Public Service EP (Smoke 7) (1981)
  - Includes "Cease to Exist", "Everyday There's Someone New" and "Kill Someone You Hate"
- Hell Comes to Your House (Bemin Brain/Time Bomb) (1981)
  - Includes "Puss 'n' Boots"
- American Youth Report (Invasion Records) (1982)
  - Includes "Notes and Chords Mean Nothing to Me"
- Enigma Variations (Enigma/Virgin) (1985)
  - Includes "Citadel"
- The Melting Pot (SST) (1988)
  - Billed as Revolution 409 performs covers of The Osmonds - Crazy Horses & The Sylvers, Boogie Fever.
  - Billed as Ledd Kross performs a cover of Led Zeppelin - Stairway to Heaven
- The Spirit of 76 - Original Soundtrack (Rhino) (1991)
  - Includes "1976"
- Freedom of Choice: Yesterday's New Wave Hits as Performed by Today's Stars (City Slang/Caroline) (1992)
  - Band covers The Go-Gos song "How Much More"
- Shared Vision – The Songs of the Beatles (Hammer and Lace/Mercury) (1993)
  - Band covers Beatles song "It Won't Be Long"
- If I Were a Carpenter (A & M) (1994)
  - Redd Kross performs a cover of "Yesterday Once More"
- Poptopia! Power Pop Classics of the '90s (Rhino) (1997)
  - Includes "Lady in the Front Row"
- KISS Tribute in Japan (Mercury) (1998)
  - With Kanako Nakayama, Redd Kross performs a cover of "Hard Luck Woman"
