= Off! (album) =

Studio album by Off!
- Released: May 8, 2012
- Recorded: February 16–18, 2012
- Genre: Hardcore punk
- Length: 15:44
- Label: Vice
- Producer: Dimitri Coats

Off! chronology
First Four EPs (2010)	Off! (2012)	Wasted Years (2014)

Professional ratings
Aggregate scores
Source	Rating
Metacritic	77/100
Review scores
Source	Rating
AllMusic	4.5/5 stars
Pitchfork Media	(7.1/10.0)
The Silver Tongue	5/5 stars

Off! is the debut studio album by the band Off! It was released on May 8, 2012, by Vice Records on CD and LP and by Burger Records on cassette.

The album was recorded in three days, from February 16–18, 2012, at Kingsize Soundlabs.

== Track listing ==
All tracks are written by Dimitri Coats and Keith Morris.

No.	Title	Length
1.	"Wiped Out"	1:13
2.	"I Got News for You"	0:41
3.	"Elimination"	0:44
4.	"Cracked"	0:52
5.	"Wrong"	0:49
6.	"Borrow and Bomb"	0:46
7.	"Toxic Box"	0:56
8.	"Man from Nowhere"	1:00
9.	"Jet Black Girls"	1:24
10.	"King Kong Brigade"	1:36
11.	"Harbor Freeway Blues"	1:14
12.	"Feelings Are Meant to Be Hurt"	1:05
13.	"Vaporized"	0:48
14.	"503"	0:45
15.	"Zero for Conduct"	0:46
16.	"I Need One (I Want One)"	1:05
17.	"Turpentine Wine" (iTunes bonus track)	1:11

== Personnel ==
Off!

- Dimitri Coats – guitar, production
- Steven Shane McDonald – bass guitar, mixing
- Keith Morris – vocals
- Mario Rubalcaba – drums

Production

- JJ Golden – mastering
- Andrew Lynch – engineering
- Raymond Pettibon – artwork
