= Marcus Henderson =

Marcus Henderson may refer to:

- Marcus Henderson (musician) (born 1973), rock and heavy metal guitarist
- Marcus Henderson (actor), American actor
- Marcus Henderson, a character on the TV series Smart Guy
