= Hang Love =

Studio album by Burning Brides
- Released: June 19, 2007
- Genre: Post-grunge
- Length: 45:03
- Label: Modart/Caroline
- Producer: Dimitri Coats

Burning Brides chronology
Leave No Ashes (2004)	Hang Love (2007)	Anhedonia (2008)

Hang Love is the third album by the American hard rock band Burning Brides. It was released on June 19, 2007, independently by the band.

AllMusic stated in its review of the album, "On their third full-length album, 2007's HANG LOVE, Philadelphia heavies Burning Brides unveil another set of lumbering post-grunge rock."

== Track listing ==
All tracks are written by Dimitri Coats.

No.	Title	Length
1.	"Ring Around The Rosary"	4:43
2.	"San Diego"	4:01
3.	"She Comes To Me"	5:56
4.	"Waring Street"	3:21
5.	"Your Nation Will Die"	4:30
6.	"Unglued"	6:22
7.	"Poor House"	4:16
8.	"Feel No Shame"	3:13
9.	"Hang Love"	4:28
10.	"And I'm Free"	4:43

== Personnel ==
- Dimitri Coats - electric guitar, vocals
- Melanie Coats - bass
- Pat Beeman - drums
