= Wasted Years (album) =

Studio album by Off!
- Released: April 8, 2014
- Recorded: December 2013–January 2014
- Genre: Hardcore punk
- Length: 23:18
- Label: Vice
- Producer: Dimitri Coats

Off! chronology
Off! (2012)	Wasted Years (2014)	Free LSD (2022)

Wasted Years is the second studio album by the band Off! It was released on April 8, 2014 by Vice Records. As with their previous albums, it features 16 tracks and cover art by Raymond Pettibon.

The band recorded 19 songs at their rehearsal space to analog tape, leaving three off of the album. "In Your Arms" appears as a digital bonus track and a 7", released on Record Store Day 2014, features "Learn to Obey" backed by "I See Through You." The first song from the album, "Void You Out", was premiered by Rolling Stone on January 22, 2014.

'Wasted Years' premiered on the Billboard 200 at #67.

Professional ratings
Aggregate scores
Source	Rating
Metacritic	74/100
Review scores
Source	Rating
Allmusic	4/5 stars
Alternative Press	3.5/5 stars
The A.V. Club	B−
Consequence of Sound	B
Exclaim!	8/10
The Guardian	4/5 stars
NME	7/10
Pitchfork Media	6.2/10
Popmatters	6/10 discs
Rock Sound	6/10

== Track listing ==
All tracks are written by Dimitri Coats and Keith Morris.

No.	Title	Length
1.	"Void You Out"	1:10
2.	"Red White and Black"	1:37
3.	"Legion of Evil"	1:20
4.	"No Easy Escape"	1:05
5.	"Over Our Heads"	1:43
6.	"Hypnotized"	2:15
7.	"It Didn't Matter to Me"	1:28
8.	"Exorcised"	1:25
9.	"Death Trip on the Party Train"	1:13
10.	"I Won't Be a Casualty"	1:16
11.	"All I Can Grab"	1:14
12.	"Time's Not On Your Side"	1:37
13.	"Meet Your God"	1:40
14.	"Mr. Useless"	1:07
15.	"You Must Be Damned"	1:50
16.	"Wasted Years"	1:18
17.	"In Your Arms" (digital bonus track)	1:27

== Personnel ==
Band

- Dimitri Coats – guitar, producer
- Steven Shane McDonald – bass guitar
- Keith Morris – vocals
- Mario Rubalcaba – drums

Production

- Raymond Pettibon – artwork
