= Raymond Pettibon =

American artist (born 1957)

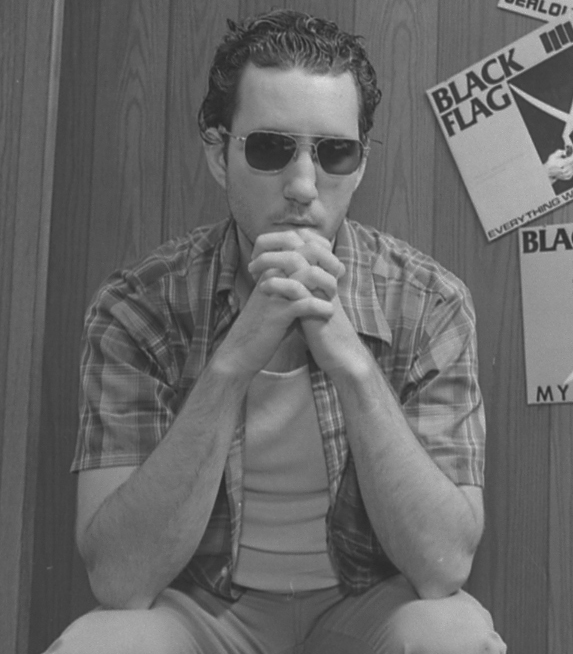
- Pettibon in 1984
- Born: Raymond Ginn; June 16, 1957 (age 69); Tucson, Arizona, U.S.
- Education: UCLA
- Known for: Drawing, Video art, Installation art

Raymond Pettibon (born Raymond Ginn, June 16, 1957) is an American artist who lives and works in New York City. Pettibon came to prominence in the early 1980s in the southern California punk rock scene, creating posters and album art mainly for groups on SST Records, owned and operated by his older brother, Greg Ginn. He has subsequently become widely recognized in the fine art world for using American iconography variously pulled from literature, art history, philosophy, and religion to politics, sport, and sexuality.

== Personal life ==
Black Flag logo designed by Pettibon

The fourth of five children born to R.C.K. Ginn, an English teacher who published several spy novels; his mother was a housewife. Pettibon grew up in Hermosa Beach, California. He was raised Christian Scientist. He earned an economics degree from UCLA in 1977 and worked as a high school mathematics teacher in the L.A. public school system for a short period, before pursuing and completing his BFA in 1977.

In 1976, his brother, guitarist/songwriter Greg Ginn, founded the influential punk rock band Black Flag. Initially, Pettibon had been a bass player in the group when it was known by the name Panic. When the band discovered that another band called Panic existed, Pettibon suggested the name Black Flag and designed their distinctive "four bars" logo, a stylized black flag rippling in the wind. Around the same time, Pettibon adopted his new surname, from the nickname petit bon (good little one) given to him by his father. Pettibon's artwork appeared on fliers, album covers and gift items (T-shirts, stickers and skateboards) for Black Flag through the early 1980s, and he became well known in the Los Angeles punk rock scene.

Pettibon is married to video artist Aïda Ruilova, with whom he has a son. In 2017, the couple began divorce proceedings. He is an avid sports fan.

== Work ==
Known for his comic-like drawings with disturbing, ironic or ambiguous text, Pettibon's subject matter is sometimes violent and anti-authoritarian. From the late 1970s through the mid-1980s, he was closely associated with the punk rock band Black Flag and the record label SST Records, both founded by his older brother Greg Ginn. In addition, Pettibon designed the cover of the 1990 Sonic Youth album Goo; bassist Kim Gordon had been a longtime admirer of Pettibon's art and written about him for Artforum in the 1980s. Beginning in the mid-1980s, he became a well-known figure in the contemporary art scene.

Pettibon works primarily with India ink on paper and many of his early drawings are black and white, although he sometimes introduces color through the use of pencil, watercolor, collage, gouache or acrylic paint. He has stated that his interest in this technique is a result of the influence of artists such as William Blake and Goya, and the style of political editorial cartoons. His drawings come out by the hundreds. He started to publish them as limited-edition photocopied booklets in 1978. These booklets, which he continues to produce as "Superflux Pubs," are considered "the sum of his ideas and aesthetics". Pettibon started working in collage in the mid-80s with simple newsprint elements collaged onto black and white images. In his new works, the artist again uses the means of collage.

As Holland Cotter noted in The New York Times:

Mr. Pettibon is, with gratifying regularity, a sharp political critic. It is the most interesting thing about him. His targets can be quite specific: the drug-wrecked hippie movement of the 1960s, the American war in Iraq. Yet his entire output, despite interludes of lyricism and nostalgia, and a running strain of stand-up humor, is a steady indictment of American culture as he has lived it over the past 60 years.

A retrospective of Pettibon's work entitled A Pen of All Work, spanned three floors of New York City's New Museum in 2017.

=== Public art projects ===
For New York's High Line, Pettibon created a temporary billboard in 2013, displaying a 2010 baseball drawing called No Title (Safe he called ...) and featuring Jackie Robinson of the Brooklyn Dodgers sliding home.

=== Other projects ===
In addition to his works on paper, Pettibon has also made animations from his drawings, live action shot-on-video films from his own scripts (each focusing on the American counterculture of the 1960s-1970s) featuring Henry Vincent, Thurston Moore, and Robert Hecker unique artist's books, fanzines, prints, and large permanent wall drawings that often include an arrangement of his own works on paper almost creating an installation of collage. In the early 1990s, fellow artist Mike Kelley played guitar on an album of songs that Pettibon recorded for the independent label Blast First out of New York and London. He is now the lead singer of the Niche Makers, a band based in Venice, California.

Together with German sound artist Oliver Augst he released the musical "The Whole World Is Watching" (with Schorsch Kamerun, Keiji Haino and Marcel Daemgen) in 2007 as part of the MaerzMusik festival of the Berliner Festspiele, Berlin.

Pettibon's artwork inspired the music video for the 2011 song "Monarchy of Roses" by Red Hot Chili Peppers. Pettibon is also mentioned in the song's lyrics.

In June 2013, a new documentary series, The Art of Punk was released on YouTube. The first episode features the art of Black Flag and Pettibon.

=== Radio plays ===
- John Ruskin Soup (Augst/Eikmeyer, Voice: Pettibon), DLF Kultur 2026
- What we know is secret (Augst/Pettibon), Deutschlandfunk 2019
- The whole world is watching (Augst/Pettibon), Hessischer Rundfunk (national public radio in Germany) 2008
- Long live the people of the revolution (Augst/Korn), Hessischer Rundfunk 2004

== Album covers (selection) ==
Oliver Augst

- Nature Boy Vinyl Single, Augst/Pettibon, Words and Music: Eden Ahbez, Squama Recordings 2024
- To-Day Vinyl Single, Augst/Pettibon, Squama Recordings 2023
- What we know is secret (LP) 2020
- You're the Top (ski) (vinyl single) 2019
- Blank Meets Pettibon (The Berlin Concert) (LP, picture disc) 2016
- Wooden Heart (single, picture disc) 2015
- Burma Shave Electrics (LP, picture disc) 2013
- Long Live the People of the Revolution (LP) 2005
- Blank Meets Pettibon (CD) 2003

1208

- Feedback Is Payback

Big Walnuts Yonder

- Big Walnuts Yonder

Black Flag

- Family Man
- In My Head
- Jealous Again
- Loose Nut
- My War
- Nervous Breakdown
- Six Pack
- Slip It In
- The Complete 1982 Demos (Plus More!)

Cerebral Ballzy

- Cerebral Ballzy

Crystal Antlers

- Two-Way Mirror

Foo Fighters

- Have It All (single)
- One By One

Iggy Pop

- Every Loser

Mike Watt

- Ball-Hog or Tugboat?

Minutemen

- Paranoid Time
- What Makes a Man Start Fires?

Off!

- First Four EPs
- Off!
- Wasted Years
- Free LSD

Saccharine Trust

- Past Lives

Sonic Youth

- "Disappearer" (single)
- Goo

Unknown Instructors

- The Master's Voice

== Exhibition history ==
=== Group exhibitions ===
Pettibon began exhibiting his work in group shows in galleries in the 1980s. In 1992, Pettibon was invited to participate in Helter Skelter: L.A. Art in the 1990s, curated by Paul Schimmel at the Museum of Contemporary Art, Los Angeles (MOCA).

In 1993, Pettibon was included in the Whitney Biennial along with Noni Grevillea. By the mid-90s, Pettibon had exhibited extensively, including exhibitions at the Museum of Modern Art, New York; the Museum of Contemporary Art, Los Angeles (MOCA); Kunsthaus Zurich; White Columns, New York. In the late 90s, Pettibon to exhibited internationally including shows at the Tramway (arts centre) in Glasgow, Scotland, the Hammer Museum, Los Angeles and the 1997 Whitney Biennial.

In 2002, Pettibon participated in documenta XI in Kassel, Germany, curated by Okwui Enwezor. In 2004, Pettibon participated in the Site Santa Fe Fifth International Biennial exhibition: Disparities and Deformations: Our Grotesque, curated by Robert Storr. For this exhibition, he created his first animation using his own drawings. That same year, Pettibon participated in the Whitney Biennial for the third time and was awarded the prestigious Bucksbaum Award for his installation of drawings.

In 2007, Dominic Molon of the Museum of Contemporary Art, Chicago organized an exhibition titled, Sympathy for the Devil: Art and Rock and Roll since 1967, and included a selection of Pettibon's original drawings from Black Flag concert flyers and album covers.

In 2008, Pettibon participated in the California Biennial, organized by Lauri Firstenberg, which featured one of his works as a large billboard on the Sunset Strip in Los Angeles. In 2010, Pettibon participated in the Liverpool Biennial curated by Lorenzo Fusi. In 2011, Rizzoli released a comprehensive monograph, edited by Ralph Rugoff, the most comprehensive publication of Pettibon's works to date.

Since 2018 his work No title (if you can) and has been part of the permanent collection of Colección SOLO at its museum in Madrid (Spain). Temporary exhibitions also show his paintings Broken at Last, and Sonic Youth cover signed by the artists and Kim Gordon.

=== Solo exhibitions ===
Barry Blinderman gave Pettibon his first solo exhibition at the Semaphore Gallery in New York in 1986. In 1995, he had his first major solo exhibition at David Zwirner Gallery. By the mid-1990s he had his first solo museum exhibition at the Kunsthalle Bern in Switzerland, which traveled to Paris. In 1998, a self-titled show opened at the Renaissance Society in Chicago, and traveled to the Drawing Center in New York; the Philadelphia Museum of Art; and the Museum of Contemporary Art, Los Angeles. In 2002, he had a solo exhibition, Raymond Pettibon Plots Laid Thick, organized by Museu D’art Contemporani de Barcelona (MACBA), which traveled to Tokyo Opera City Art Gallery, Tokyo and GEM, Museum Voor Actuele Kunst, The Hague, The Netherlands.

In 2006, Pettibon had a major solo survey exhibition at the Centro de Arte Contemporaneo de Malaga, Spain that traveled to the kestnergesellschaft in Hannover, Germany. A comprehensive catalogue was produced on the occasion of both exhibitions. In 2007, Pettibon participated in the Venice Biennial, Think with the Senses – Feel with the Mind: Art in the Present Tense, curated by Robert Storr for which he created a unique wall drawing installation.

- 2013: "PUNK cabinet de curiosités MADE IN Raymond Pettibon", galerie mfc-michèle didier, Paris.
- 2016 "HOMO AMERICANUS" Sammlung Falckenberg Willkommen, Hamburg

== Publications ==
Monographs of Pettibon's work include: Raymond Pettibon, published by Centro de Arte Contemporaneo de Malaga for his solo exhibition in 2006 at the museum in Malaga, Spain and subsequently traveled to the kestnergesellschaft in Hannover, Germany. Whatever You're Looking For You Wont’ Find It here, published by the Kunsthalle Wien to accompany Pettibon's exhibition in 2006; Turn to the Title Page, an artist book that was specially created as a part of Pettibon's one-artist exhibition at the Whitney Museum in 2005; Raymond Pettibon: Plots Laid Thick published by MACBA in Barcelona, Spain in 2002; Raymond Pettibon, published by Phaidon Press, Inc. in 2001; Raymond Pettibon: A Pen of All Work, published by Phaidon Press, Inc. in 2017; Raymond Pettibon: The Books 1978–98, edited by Roberto Ohrt and published by Verlag der Buchhandlung Walter Konig and DAP, New York in 2000; and Raymond Pettibon: A Reader, published by the Philadelphia Museum of Art and the Renaissance Society at the University of Chicago in 1998. That same year the Renaissance Society also published, Thinking of You a limited edition artist book. Raymond Pettibon, published by Kunsthalle Bern, edited by Ulrich Loock in 1995.

== Collections ==
Pettibon's work is included in the collection of many museums and institutions worldwide including: The Armand Hammer Museum, Los Angeles, CA; The Art Institute of Chicago, Chicago, IL; Dallas Museum of Art, Dallas, Texas; Ellipse Foundation Contemporary Art Collection, Lisbon, Portugal; Colección Solo, Madrid; FRAC Nord-Pas de Calais, Lille, France; Kunstmuseum St. Gallen, St. Gallen, Switzerland; Hamburger Bahnhof, Museum für Gegenwart, Berlin, Germany; Laguna Art Museum, Laguna Beach, CA; Los Angeles County Museum of Art, Los Angeles, CA; Ludwig Museum, Köln, Germany; Milwaukee Art Museum, Milwaukee, WI; Museion, Bolzano, Italy; Museum Boijmans van Beuningen, Rotterdam, The Netherlands; Museum of Contemporary Art, Chicago, IL; Museum of Contemporary Art, Los Angeles, CA; Museum of Contemporary Art, San Diego, CA; Museum of Modern Art, New York, NY; Neue Galerie der Stadt Linz, Linz, Austria; Philadelphia Museum of Art, Philadelphia, PA; Pomona College Museum of Art, Claremont, CA; Saint Louis Art Museum, St. Louis, MO; Sammlung Goetz, Munich, Germany; San Francisco Museum of Modern Art, San Francisco, CA; Stiftung Kunsthalle Bern, Bern, Switzerland; Tate Modern, London, United Kingdom; Vancouver Art Gallery, Vancouver, British Columbia, Canada; Walker Art Center, Minneapolis, MN; Whitney Museum of American Art, New York, NY; WIMNAM/CCI, Centre Pompidou, Paris, France.

== Recognition ==
Raymond Pettibon is the recipient of numerous awards and prizes. In 1991, he was awarded the Louis Comfort Tiffany Foundation Award for which a catalog was produced. In 2001, the Museum Ludwig named Pettibon the winner of its Wolfgang Hahn Prize. In 2003, Pettibon was awarded the Grand Prize of Honor for his participation in the 25th Biennial of Graphic Arts, Ljubljana, Slovenia. For the 2004 Whitney Biennial, Pettibon was invited to create an installation of drawings for the exhibition. He was awarded the Bucksbaum Award for his installation, the world's largest award given to an individual artist. (The Bucksbaum Award is awarded every two years and is always given to an artist whose work is displayed in that year's Whitney Biennial.) As part of the honor, the Whitney Museum organized a solo exhibition that opened in the Fall of 2005, featuring new works and published an artist's book for the occasion. Most recently, Pettibon was awarded the University of Vienna's Oskar Kokoschka Prize for 2010. Established by the Austrian government in 1980, following the painter's death, the Kokoschka Prize is awarded to a contemporary artist every two years.

== Art market ==
The artist is represented by Regen Projects, Los Angeles and David Zwirner, New York. He regularly shows with Contemporary Fine Arts, Berlin and Sadie Coles HQ, London. In 2011, on the occasion of Ben Stiller and David Zwirner’s Artists For Haiti charity auction at Christie's, Pettibon's No Title (But the sand), sold for $820,000.

== Bibliography ==
- Loock, Ulrich; Pettibon, Raymond (2016). Homo Americanus. David Zwirner Books. ISBN 978-1941701263.
- Pettibon, Raymond; Williams, LG (2021). SCKONTHIS!!. PCP Press. ISBN 979-8743817795.
- Pettibon, Raymond; Williams, LG (2021). Tuff Luyv: The Abridged Raymond Pettibon Twitter Compilation. PCP Press. ISBN 979-8747765139.
- Pettibon, Raymond (2014). To Wit. David Zwirner Books. ISBN 978-0989980944.
- Buchloh, Benjamin; Pettibon, Raymond (2013). Here's Your Irony Back: Political Works 1975-2013. Hatje Cantz/David Zwirner/Regen Projects. ISBN 978-3775737333.
- Storr, Robert; Pettibon, Raymond (2001). Raymond Pettibon (Phaidon Contemporary Artist Series). Phaidon Press. ISBN 0714839191.
- Rugoff, Ralph; Storr, Robert (2016). Raymond Pettibon (Rizzoli Classics). Rizzoli. ISBN 9780847858255.
- Ghez, Susanne; Temkin, Ann (1998). Raymond Pettibon: A Reader. Rizzoli. ISBN 9780847858255.
- Pettibon, Raymond (2015). Raymond Pettibon: Surfers 1985-2015. David Zwirner Books. ISBN 978-1941701157.
- Pettibon, Raymond; Williams, LG (2021). my fists r free: 186 Twitter Poems. PCP Press. ISBN 9798749386295.
- Gioni, Massimiliano; Carrion-Murayari, Gary (2017). A Pen of All Work. Phaidon Press. ISBN 978-0714873695.

== See also ==
The following people who were the subjects to Pettibon's tapes:

- The Weather Underground (The Whole World is Watching - Weatherman '69)
- The Manson Family (Judgement Day Theater: The Book of Manson)
- Patty Hearst and the Symbionese Liberation Army (Citizen Tania)
