= First Four EPs =

Compilation album by Off!
- Released: December 14, 2010
- Recorded: January 17 & August 25, 2010
- Genre: Hardcore punk
- Length: 17:36
- Label: Vice
- Producer: Dimitri Coats

Off! chronology
First Four EPs (2010)	Off! (2012)

Professional ratings
Review scores
Source	Rating
Allmusic	4.5/5 stars
Chicago Tribune	3.5/4 stars
Los Angeles Times	3/4 stars
Pitchfork Media	(8.5/10.0)
Punknews.org	4.5/5 stars
Rolling Stone	3.5/5 stars

First Four EPs is a compilation album by the punk band Off!. The album features four 7-inch EP vinyl albums, released on December 14, 2010, by Vice Records. The CD version followed on February 15, 2011, and both contain artwork by Raymond Pettibon. The album was produced by Dimitri Coats and recorded and mixed by Steven Shane McDonald, also the band's bass guitarist.

== Track listing ==
All songs written by Dimitri Coats and Keith Morris, unless noted.

No.	Title	Length
1.	"Black Thoughts"	1:01
2.	"Darkness"	0:48
3.	"I Don't Belong"	1:00
4.	"Upside Down" (Coats, Morris, Greg Hetson)	1:13
5.	"Poison City"	1:33
6.	"Now I'm Pissed" (Coats, Morris, Carlo Nuccio)	1:01
7.	"Killing Away"	0:47
8.	"Jeffrey Lee Pierce" (Coats, Morris, Jeffrey Lee Pierce)	1:21
9.	"Panic Attack"	1:01
10.	"Crawl"	1:15
11.	"Blast"	1:09
12.	"Rat Trap"	1:20
13.	"Fuck People"	1:12
14.	"Full of Shit"	0:34
15.	"Broken"	0:49
16.	"Peace in Hermosa"	1:32

=== Bonus tracks ===
- "Zero Hour" [iTunes exclusive bonus track] (Case) - 1:26
- "Sexy Capitalists" [eMusic exclusive bonus track] - 1:02

== Personnel ==
Band

- Dimitri Coats – guitar, design
- Steven Shane McDonald – bass guitar
- Keith Morris – vocals
- Mario Rubalcaba – drums

Production

- Dimitri Coats – production
- JJ Golden – mastering
- Andrew Lynch – engineering, mixing
- Steven McDonald – engineering, mixing
- Raymond Pettibon – artwork, liner notes
- Sean Peterson – photography
