= Anhedonia (disambiguation) =

Anhedonia is an inability to experience pleasurable emotions from normally pleasurable life events.

Anhedonia may also refer to:

- Anhedonia (Burning Brides album)
- Anhedonia (The Graduate album)
- Ethel Cain (Hayden Silas Anhedönia; born 1998), American singer-songwriter
- Anhedonia, the working title for the 1977 film Annie Hall
