= Roadie Tuner =

Guitar tuner

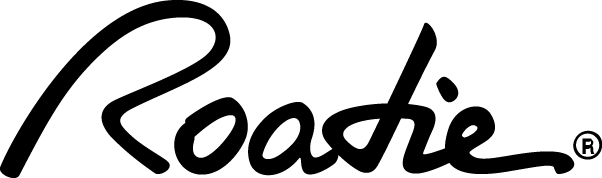
- Industry: Automatic Guitar Tuner
- Founded: 2012
- Founder: Hassane Slaibi, Bassam Jalgha
- Headquarters: Washington, United States
- Products: Roadie Tuner; Roadie 2; Roadie 3; Roadie Bass
- Number of employees: 20
- Website: www.roadietuner.com

Roadie tuners are automatic stringed instrument tuners created and developed by the music-tech startup, Band Industries, Inc. Roadie 3, the last iteration in the Roadie tuner family is compatible with stringed instruments that have a guitar machine head including electric, acoustic, classical and steel guitars, 6-7-12 string guitars, ukuleles, mandolins and banjos. Roadie Bass is designed to tune bass guitars as well as the instruments Roadie 3 can tune.

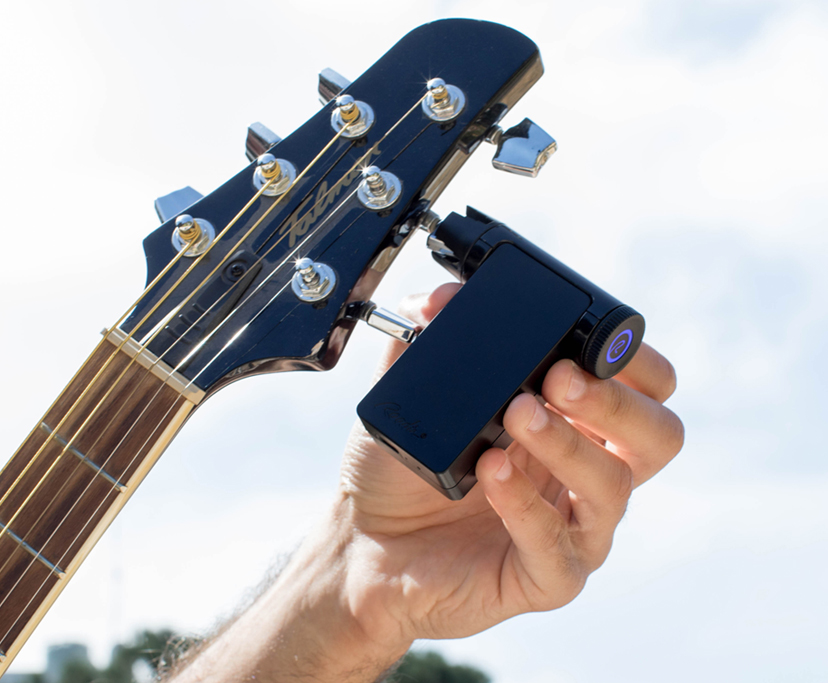
Roadie 2 Automatic Guitar Tuner

== History ==
Roadie Tuner was created by two bandmates, Bassam Jalgha, an Arabic oud player, and Hassane Slaibi, a flute player. The Roadie co-founders were both engineering students at the American University of Beirut when Jalgha wished there was an easier and faster way to tune his twelve-stringed instrument. The idea of Roadie Tuner was then born. The first prototype of Roadie was created in 2009 during a reality TV show in Qatar: Stars of Science, where Jalgha won the first prize of $300,000. In 2012, Jalgha teamed up with Slaibi and started the company Band Industries. The company joined the Haxlr8r accelerator program in Shenzhen during 2013. In 2013, Band Industries launched its first Kickstarter campaign to crowdfund the Roadie Tuner. By January 2014, the Roadie Tuner project tripled its initial goal raising $178,613 from 2,002 backers and the original Roadie Tuner was released to market. In 2016, Band Industries showcased the Roadie Tuner at the NAMM Show in Anaheim and became a NAMM member. Later, in May 2017, the company worked on their next generation products, Roadie 2 and Roadie Bass and raised $502, 931 with this second Kickstarter campaign. In 2020 Band Industries launched Roadie 3, their latest and most advanced tuner to date raising $449,310 in crowdfunding on Kickstarter and Indiegogo.

== Products ==
=== Roadie Tuner ===
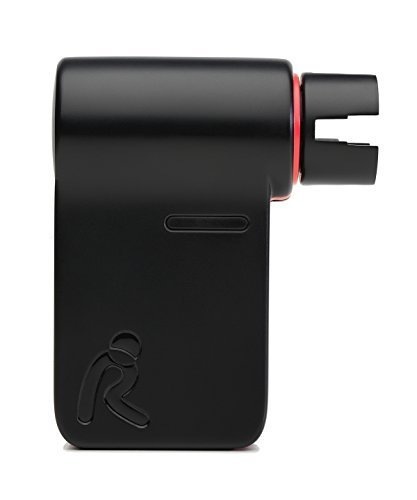
Roadie Tuner

The Roadie Tuner was launched in 2014 and is the first-generation product in the family of Roadie automatic guitar tuners. Roadie Tuner robotically rotates the pegs of stringed instruments to bring them to the desired pitch. To work, the tuner requires to be connected with its free Roadie Tuner mobile application available for both Android and iOS users. Roadie’s rotating head fits over the tuning pegs, and as the user plucks each string, the app will listen and send a bluetooth command to the device to adjust the tuning to the correct setting. Through the mobile application, users can set their tuning of choice, including alternate tunings and create their own custom tunings.

=== Roadie 2 ===
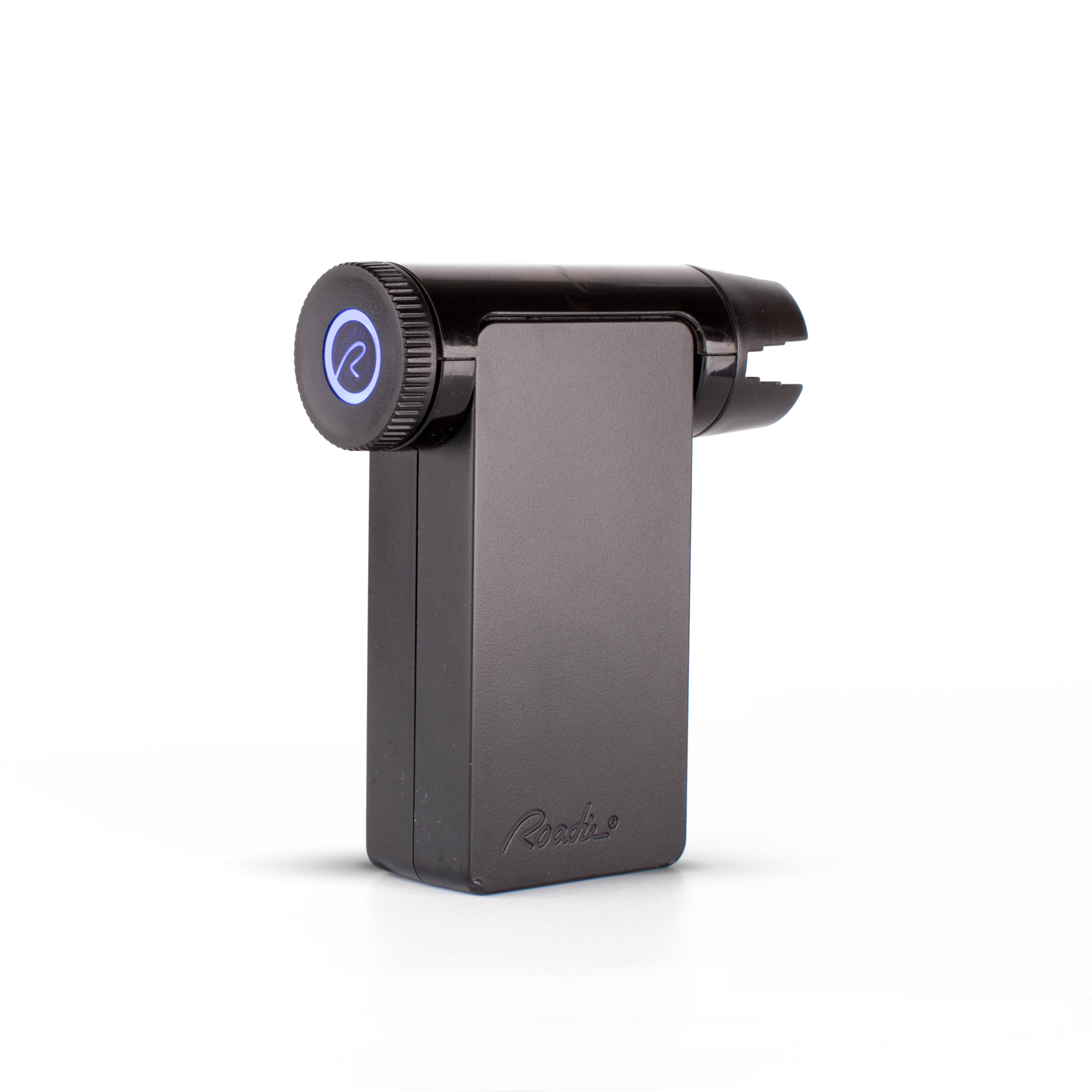
Roadie 2

Roadie 2 is the second-generation product in the family of Roadie automatic guitar tuners. Roadie 2 automatically rotates the pegs of stringed instruments that have a guitar machine head including electric, acoustic, classical and steel guitars, 6-7-12 string guitars, ukuleles, mandolins and banjos. Roadie 2 was upgraded from its predecessor to work as an independent standalone device which does not require the Roadie Tuner mobile application to function. For that, it has a built-in OLED screen and a selection wheel for users to choose their desired tuning out of preset alternate tunings or to access the string-winding mode when changing the strings on an instrument. In contrast to the first-generation product, Roadie 2 uses a vibration sensing technology instead of a microphone, allowing users to accurately adjust their tuning in noisy environments as well. The Roadie Tuner mobile app is an optional tool to use alongside Roadie 2 and enables users to create their own custom tunings and sync them to their Roadie device.

=== Roadie Bass ===
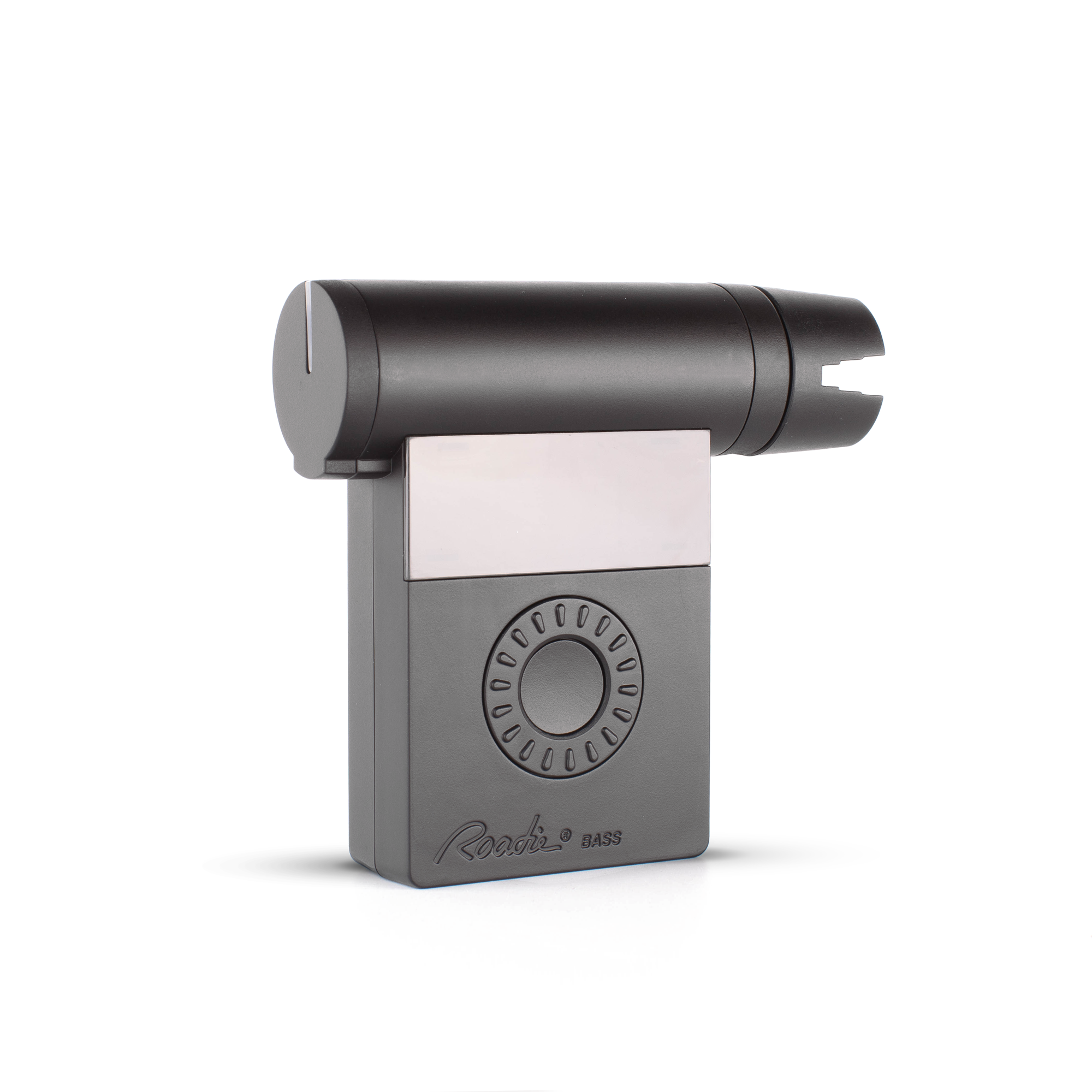
Roadie Bass

In addition to having all the features of Roadie 2, Roadie Bass can also tune bass guitars. It has a more powerful motor than its predecessor, allowing it to tune instruments with a string gauge of up to 140. Like the Roadie 2, it is also an independent standalone device that can be used with the optional Roadie Tuner mobile application for access to additional features such as creating a custom tuning or altering the reference pitch.

=== Roadie 3 ===
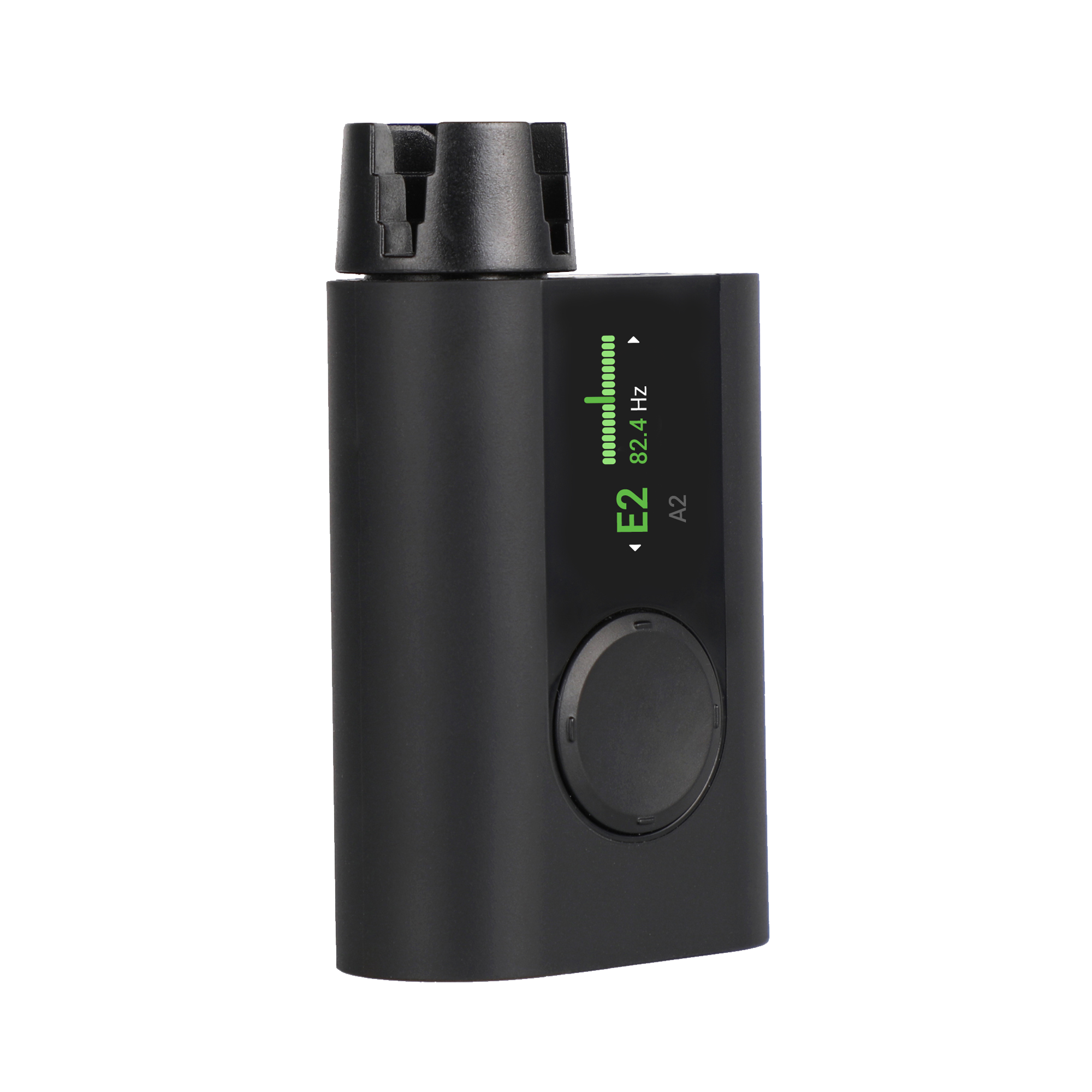
Roadie 3 automatic instrument tuner

Roadie 3 is the latest product release in the family of Roadie automatic guitar tuners. Like Roadie 2, Roadie 3 is compatible with and tunes most stringed instruments with geared pegs (excluding bass guitar). However the new and improved version sports an updated ergonomic design and a full colour high resolution LED screen. Another noteworthy update for Roadie 3 is the quicker peg rotation, greater noise immunity and improved accuracy when tuning. It’s also got 150+ built-in alternate tunings compared to its predecessor which came with 40. A built- in vibrating metronome was also included to help players keep a tight rhythm. Additionally, Roadie 3 makes string changes less tedious allowing users to wind their strings to tension and then tune up, all in one smooth step.

== Accomplishments and awards ==
Band Industries has won several awards since its launch. In 2014, Roadie Tuner won the TechCrunch Disrupt Audience Choice Award in New York. During that same year, Band Industries was featured among the 100 Brilliant Companies by Entrepreneur magazine. Roadie Tuner also won a Gold Medal at the London Design Awards. In May 2018, Band Industries was awarded “Best Music Startup 2018” at the Primavera Pro Startups Competition in Barcelona.

Famous guitarists such as Spike Edney (Queen), Vinnie Moore (UFO), Elliot Easton (The Cars), and Marcus Henderson (Guitar Hero) have tried Roadie, as well as YouTubers and guitar teachers like Marty Schwartz, The Tone King and Scott's Bass Lessons. Roadie was reviewed by publications including Engadget, PC Magazine, TechCrunch and The Verge.
