= Cerebral Ballzy (album) =

Studio album by Cerebral Ballzy
- Released: July 26, 2011 (US)
- Recorded: Los Angeles
- Genre: Hardcore punk
- Length: 19:35
- Label: Williams Street
- Producer: Joby J Ford

Cerebral Ballzy chronology
The Grip (2011)	Cerebral Ballzy (2011)	Live at The Macbeth (2011)

Singles from Cerebral Ballzy
- 1. "Insufficient Fare" Released: November 29, 2010; 2. "Cutting Class" Released: June 19, 2011; 3. "Junky for Her" Released: July 5, 2011

Professional ratings
Aggregate scores
Source	Rating
Metacritic	71/100
Review scores
Source	Rating
Alter The Press!	3/5
Clash	4/10
Drowned in Sound	7/10
entertainment.ie	3.5/5 stars
The Guardian	3/5 stars
NME	7/10
Pitchfork Media	4.8/10
Popmatters	8/10 discs
Punknews.org	1.5/5 stars

Cerebral Ballzy is the debut album from Brooklyn band Cerebral Ballzy. It was released on July 26, 2011, in the United States through Williams Street Records.

Their album was heavily promoted on Adult Swim through a 60-second commercial spot, which is their music video for "Don't Tell Me What to Do". Directed by the film-making duo The Marshall Darlings, the promo is filmed on distorted black and white videotape and starts with a close up of lead singer Honor Titus, as he and his bandmates walk outside a nightclub and on the streets yelling out the lyrics of the song shown on the bottom of the screen.

The artwork for the album was done by Raymond Pettibon, who has previously worked with bands such as Sonic Youth, Off!, Foo Fighters and Black Flag.

== Track listing ==
No.	Title	Length
1.	"On the Run"	2:03
2.	"Office Rocker"	0:59
3.	"Don't Tell Me What to Do"	1:01
4.	"Insufficient Fare"	1:54
5.	"Junkie for Her"	1:58
6.	"Drug Myself Dumb"	1:19
7.	"Puke Song"	1:35
8.	"You're Idle"	1:40
9.	"Don't Look My Way"	1:51
10.	"SK8 All Day"	1:34
11.	"Cutting Class"	2:38
12.	"Anthem"	1:03

US Bonus Tracks
No.	Title	Length
13.	"Nowhere City"
14.	"Causing Havoc (Live at the Macbeth)"
15.	"Return of the Slice (Live at the Macbeth)"

iTunes Bonus Tracks
No.	Title	Length
13.	"Underage Drink Forever"	1:20
14.	"Meet Me at the Spot"	1:24

Deluxe Edition CD2 & iTunes UK Bonus Tracks Tracks
No.	Title	Length
13.	"Causing Havoc (Live at Detroit Bar)"
14.	"Insufficient Fare (Live at Detroit Bar)"
15.	"Drug Myself Dumb (Live at Detroit Bar)"
16.	"Office Rocker (Live at Detroit Bar)"
17.	"All I Ever Wanted (Live at Detroit Bar)"
18.	"Anthem (Live at Detroit Bar)"

== Personnel ==
- Honor Titus - lead vocals
- Melvin Honore (Mel) - bassist
- Mason - guitarist
- Jason - guitarist
- Crazy Abe - drummer
