= Fall of the Plastic Empire =

Studio album by Burning Brides
- Released: April 17, 2001
- Genre: Hard rock
- Length: 35:44
- Label: V2; File 13
- Producer: Dimitri Coats; Brian McTear

Burning Brides chronology
Fall of the Plastic Empire (2001)	Leave No Ashes (2004)

Professional ratings
Review scores
Source	Rating
AllMusic	3/5 stars

Fall of the Plastic Empire is the debut album by the American hard rock band Burning Brides. It was released on April 17, 2001, on File Thirteen Records. The next year, it was re-released on V2 with a new cover. The V2 version is viewable to the right.

== Track listing ==
All tracks are written by Dimitri Coats.

No.	Title	Length
1.	"Plank Of Fire"
2.	"Glass Slipper"
3.	"If I'm A Man"
4.	"Arctic Snow"
5.	"At the Levity Ball"
6.	"Stabbed In The Back Of The Heart"
7.	"Rainy Days"
8.	"Elevator"
9.	"Blood On the Highway"
10.	"Plastic Empire"

== Personnel ==
- Dimitri Coats - electric guitar, vocals
- Melanie Coats - bass
- Mike Ambs - drums
