= Marcus Henderson (musician) =

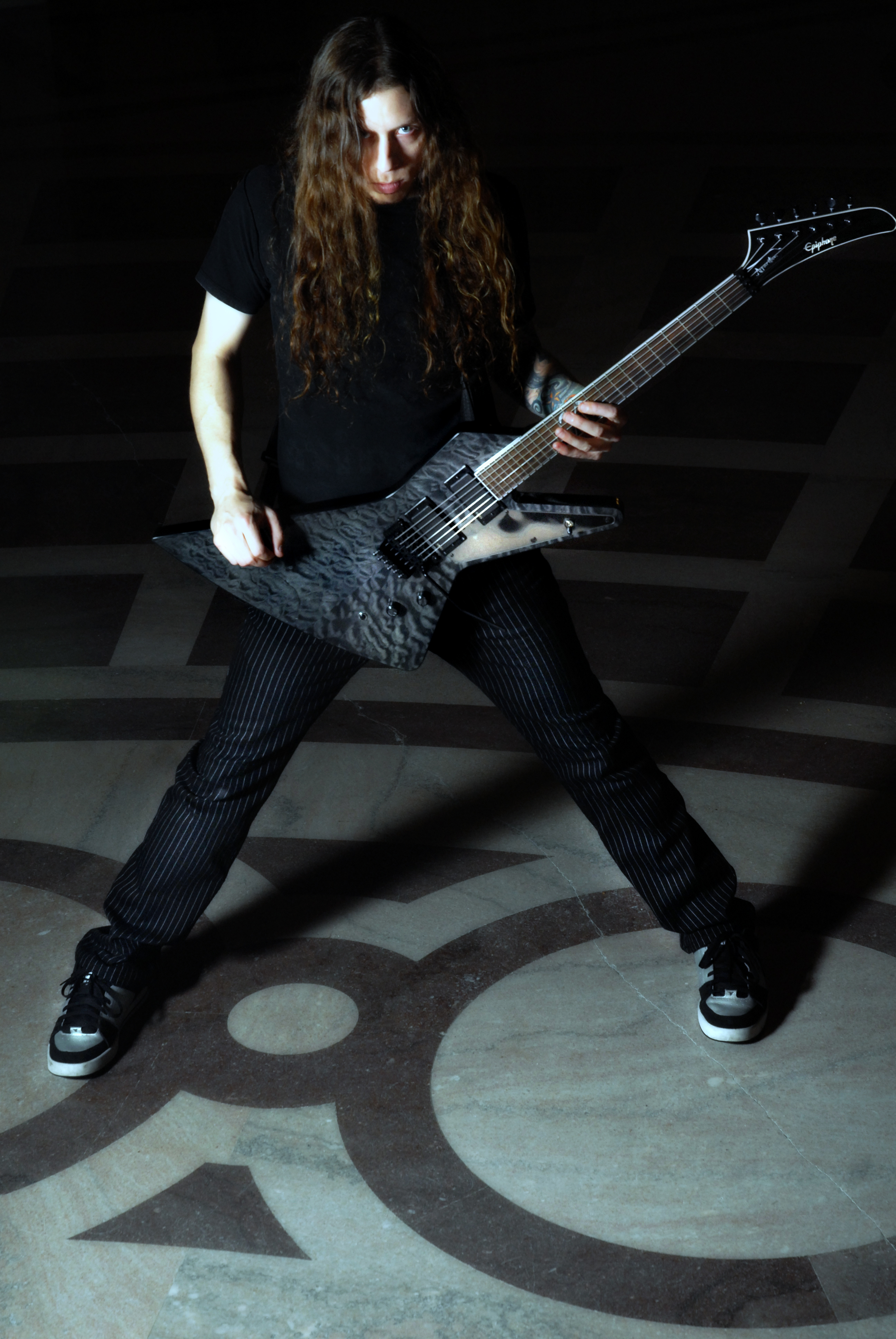

Background information
- Born: March 16, 1973 (age 53)
- Origin: Fremont, California, USA
- Genres: Rock, heavy metal
- Instrument: Guitar
- Years active: 1988–present

Marcus Henderson (born March 16, 1973) is a rock and heavy metal guitarist from the San Francisco Bay area. His previous bands include Drist and Hellbillys as well as work for En Vogue and Simon Stinger. In 2005, he was chosen to take the role as one of the lead guitarists for the Guitar Hero series. Marcus is also the on-screen guitarist for the Hal Leonard DVD books "Metal Guitar" and "Guitar Technique".

In August 2009, Henderson filmed the guitar instructional video, "Rock Guitar Heroics" in Santa Rosa, CA.

== Discography ==
Below is a list of the songs in the Guitar Hero series on which Marcus performed the guitar track.

Title	Band	Game in series
"Ace of Spades"	Motörhead	Guitar Hero
"Arterial Black"	Drist	Guitar Hero II
"Bark at the Moon"	Ozzy Osbourne	Guitar Hero
"Balls to the Wall"	Accept	Guitar Hero Encore: Rocks the 80s
"Beast and the Harlot"	Avenged Sevenfold	Guitar Hero II
"Call Me"	Blondie	Karaoke Revolution Party
"Carry Me Home"	The Living End	Guitar Hero II
"Caught in a Mosh"	Anthrax	Guitar Hero Encore: Rocks the 80s
"Cherry Pie"	Warrant	Guitar Hero II
"Cochise"	Audioslave	Guitar Hero
"Cowboys from Hell"	Pantera	Guitar Hero
"Decontrol"	Drist	Guitar Hero
"Fat Lip"	Sum 41	Guitar Hero
"Freya"	The Sword	Guitar Hero II
"Godzilla"	Blue Öyster Cult	Guitar Hero
"Hangar 18"	Megadeth	Guitar Hero II
"Headstrong"	Trapt	Karaoke Revolution Party
"Heart-Shaped Box"	Nirvana	Guitar Hero II
"Heart Full of Black"	Burning Brides	Guitar Hero
"Hey You"	The Exies	Guitar Hero
"I Love Rock 'n' Roll"	Joan Jett and the Blackhearts	Guitar Hero
"Infected"	Bad Religion	Guitar Hero
"Institutionalized"	Suicidal Tendencies	Guitar Hero II
"Iron Man"	Black Sabbath	Guitar Hero
"I Wanna Be Sedated" (Also sang)	Ramones	Guitar Hero
"Killing in the Name"	Rage Against the Machine	Guitar Hero II
"Laid to Rest"	Lamb of God	Guitar Hero II
"Madhouse"	Anthrax	Guitar Hero II
"Monkey Wrench"	Foo Fighters	Guitar Hero II
"No One Knows"	Queens of the Stone Age	Guitar Hero
"Pain"	Jimmy Eat World	Karaoke Revolution Party
"Stellar"	Incubus	Guitar Hero
"Symphony of Destruction"	Megadeth	Guitar Hero
"Take It Off"	The Donnas	Guitar Hero
"Takin' Care of Business"	Bachman-Turner Overdrive	Karaoke Revolution Party
"Them Bones"	Alice in Chains	Guitar Hero II
"The Trooper"	Iron Maiden	Guitar Hero II
"Thunder Kiss '65"	White Zombie	Guitar Hero
"Trippin' on a Hole in a Paper Heart"	Stone Temple Pilots	Guitar Hero II
"Unsung"	Helmet	Guitar Hero
"War Pigs"	Black Sabbath	Guitar Hero II & Rock Band
"Who Was In My Room Last Night?"	Butthole Surfers	Guitar Hero II
"You've Got Another Thing Comin'"	Judas Priest	Guitar Hero
"Woman"	Wolfmother	Guitar Hero II

== Further video game work ==
Marcus Henderson has also contributed other works to various games, most notably vocals in "I Wanna Be Sedated" by the Ramones, as well as the bass track in Pantera's "Cowboys From Hell" from Guitar Hero. He is credited on the Halo suite with Steve Vai for the Video Games Live Vol 1 CD. He was also one of the four main consultants on song selection for the Guitar Hero II setlist. He also recorded the guitar tracks for the EA game 1louderthan10 2011 update as the "Bergen Hammer" and provided Heavy Metal guitar sounds for the game as well as providing various video lesson and audio licks for BandFuse: Rock Legends.

== Epiphone Apparition/Marcus Henderson Signature Model ==
"The Apparition" is an electric guitar designed and endorsed by Marcus Henderson. It is built by the Epiphone Guitar Company. The Marcus Henderson Signature Model has several features that are built to increase tonal capabilities by including a "kill" button to open the pickup circuit, creating a staccato or choppy sound depending on how fast you press it, as well as a Floyd Rose double locking tremolo system.

== Philanthropy ==
In 2007, Henderson signed on as an official supporter of Little Kids Rock, a nonprofit organization that provides free musical instruments and instruction to children in under-served public schools throughout the USA. He sits on LKR's Honorary Board of Directors. Other charitable endeavors include providing signed auction items for the Grammy foundation and musicares.
