= Low (Foo Fighters song) =

- Standard artwork

Single by Foo Fighters

from the album One by One
- B-side: "Never Talking to You Again"
- Released: June 23, 2003
- Recorded: May 2002
- Genre: Hard rock; grunge
- Length: 4:28; 4:35 (live)
- Label: RCA
- Songwriters: Dave Grohl; Taylor Hawkins; Nate Mendel; Chris Shiflett
- Producers: Foo Fighters; Nick Raskulinecz

Foo Fighters singles chronology
"Times Like These" (2003)	"Low" (2003)	"Have It All" (2003)

Music video
- "Low" on YouTube

"Low" is a song by American rock band Foo Fighters from their fourth studio album, One by One (2002). It was released as the third single from the album on June 23, 2003, by RCA Records. Dave Grohl described "Low" as "the kind of song that you pray would be a single. (...) It’s the one that everybody likes, but there’s just no way ’cause it’s too weird." The song began as an instrumental demo written by Grohl and drummer Taylor Hawkins in Hawkins' home studio in Topanga, California, some time after the 2002 Coachella Valley Music and Arts Festival.

The official music video features Grohl and Jack Black entering a motel, where they proceed to get drunk, cross-dress and wreck the motel room. Originally, Grohl wanted to just film Black dancing in drag for four minutes with no edits, but director Jesse Peretz convinced him otherwise, instead creating the storyline about rednecks in lingerie at a motel room. The video was banned on MTV for its content.

A live version recorded on December 4, 2002, at the Oslo Spektrum was released with the Special Norwegian Edition of the One by One album.

The B-Side, "Never Talking to You Again", is a Hüsker Dü cover, originally from the album Zen Arcade.

== Track listing ==
=== CD (Australia) ===
1. "Low" - 4:33
2. "Enough Space" (Live in Copenhagen, Denmark, 5 December 2002)
3. "Never Talking to You Again" (Hüsker Dü cover) (Live in Hamburg, Germany 1 Dec 2002)

"Low" video (CD-ROM)
CD-ROM bonus clip "Chris' Hair"
NOTE: The track listing on the Australian single is incorrectly labelled, with Enough Space and Never Talking to You Again in switched play order

=== DVD/EP (U.S./Canada) ===
1. "Low" (Video)
2. "Times Like These" (Video)
3. "Times Like These" (UK video)
4. "Times Like These" (Acoustic video)

=== CD1 (UK) ===
1. "Low"
2. "Never Talking to You Again" (Hüsker Dü cover) (Live in Hamburg, Germany, 1 Dec 2002)

CD-ROM bonus clip "Chris' Hair"

=== CD2 (UK) ===
1. "Low"
2. "Enough Space" (Live in Copenhagen, Denmark, 5 December 2002)

"Low" video (CD-ROM)

=== 7-inch (UK) ===
1. "Low"
2. "Never Talking to You Again" (Hüsker Dü cover) (Live in Germany 1 Dec 2002)

== Chart positions ==
Chart (2003)	Peak position
Australia (ARIA)	40
Canadian Singles Chart (Physical) (Billboard)	30
Ireland (IRMA)	44
UK Singles (Official Charts)	21
UK Rock & Metal (Official Charts)	6
US Hot Singles Sales (Billboard)	10
US Alternative Airplay (Billboard)	15
US Mainstream Rock (Billboard)	23
US Top Music Videos (Billboard)	4

== Release history ==
Release dates and formats for "Like a Stone"Release dates and formats for "Low"
Region	Date	Format(s)	Label(s)	Ref.
United Kingdom	June 23, 2003	7-inch vinyl; CD	RCA	
United States	June 30–July 1, 2003	Mainstream rock; active rock; alternative radio	Roswell; RCA	
