= Anhedonia (Burning Brides album) =

Studio album by Burning Brides
- Released: June 10, 2008
- Genre: Hard rock
- Length: 38:30
- Label: Cobraside
- Producer: Dimitri Coats

Burning Brides chronology
Hang Love (2007)	Anhedonia (2008)

Anhedonia is the fourth album by the American hard rock band Burning Brides. It was released independently on June 10, 2008 by the band. The 2009 rock and roll vampire film Suck features two songs from Anhedonia, "If One Of Us Goes Further" and "Flesh And Bone." Brides frontman Dimitri Coats stars in the movie alongside Malcolm McDowell, Alice Cooper, and Iggy Pop.

== Track listing ==
All tracks are written by Dimitri Coats.

No.	Title	Length
1.	"Lovesick"	3:06
2.	"Summer Leaves"	2:00
3.	"If One of Us Goes Further"	3:05
4.	"Hurry Up"	2:44
5.	"Flesh and Bone"	3:52
6.	"Comfortably Dumb"	2:27
7.	"This Is a Wave"	2:50
8.	"Heavy Rocks"	4:07
9.	"Start Your Own Religion"	1:51
10.	"So What"	2:43
11.	"Fire Escape"	2:46
12.	"Flood Lights"	2:38
13.	"Anhedonia"	4:21

== Personnel ==
- Dimitri Coats – electric guitar, vocals
- Melanie Coats – bass
- Jeff Watson – drums
