= Times Like These (Foo Fighters song) =

2003 single by Foo Fighters

- Artwork for CD1 single

Single by Foo Fighters

from the album One by One
- B-side: "A Life of Illusion"; "Planet Claire"; "Normal"
- Released: January 6, 2003
- Recorded: May 2002
- Studio: 606 (Alexandria, Virginia)
- Genre: Alternative rock; hard rock
- Length: 4:26
- Label: Roswell; RCA
- Songwriters: Dave Grohl; Taylor Hawkins; Nate Mendel; Chris Shiflett
- Producers: Foo Fighters; Nick Raskulinecz

Foo Fighters singles chronology
"All My Life" (2002)	"Times Like These" (2003)	"Low" (2003)

Music videos
- "Times Like These" (Version 1) on YouTube; "Times Like These" (Version 2) on YouTube

"Times Like These" is a song by American rock band Foo Fighters. It is the fourth track from their fourth album One by One (2002), and was released as its second single on January 6, 2003.

== Composition ==
The lyrics discuss how Dave Grohl felt "like I wasn't entirely myself" during the three-month hiatus the Foo Fighters entered following the tense and unsatisfying first recording sessions for One by One, as well as his uncertainty about the future of the band. The lyric "I'm a new day rising" is a reference to the album New Day Rising by Hüsker Dü, one of Grohl's favorite groups.

"Times Like These" is in D Mixolydian mode and the section that begins at 0:13 is in 7/4 time. The chorus of the song is also grouped in bars of 3 rather than the regular bars of 4. The intro starts in 8/4 time for 4 bars, then switches to 7/4 for 8 bars and then 3 bars of 8/4 again before leading into the first verse, which is also in 8/4. It is set at 145 BPM.

After the album version ended its run on the charts, a solo acoustic version of the song performed by Grohl was released. The acoustic version had some success on pop and adult contemporary radio; generally, it enjoyed great success on rock and alternative radio just like the original electric version.

== Music videos ==
Two music videos were made for the studio version of the song and a third music video was made for an acoustic version of the song. All three versions were made available via the DVD release "Low/Times Like These"(2003):

=== Version 1 ===
Directed by Liam Lynch. The band is shown performing the song against changing backgrounds, consisting mainly of brightly colored kaleidoscopic forms similar to those found in music visualization, giving the video a psychedelic, hopeful, joyful mood. In the end, the backgrounds blink out to reveal that the band are performing against a greenscreen in a studio. This version is often referred to as the "UK version" and received little airplay in the US as the band ultimately opted to film another video shortly afterward.

=== Version 2 ===
Directed by Marc Klasfeld. The video was shot on the Rainbow Bridge in Victorville, CA (15597 Mineral Rd, Victorville, CA) and shows the band performing the song on location, below and in front of a bridge. A girl wanders onto the bridge and eventually tosses her Game Boy Advance at them. Gradually, more and more people arrive at the bridge and start throwing other inanimate objects (including appliances, instruments, and furniture) behind and around the oblivious band members. The items never hit any of them, though they come close. The actions of the participants would suggest that their motivations and intentions are to cast off the material trappings of society which prohibit them from living freely.

Two cars (a Chevrolet Camaro and an MGB) are then simultaneously dropped off the bridge and behind the band, resulting in clouds of smoke and fire. This is followed by an entire house (only with walls and roof) being dropped onto the band by a crane, and the walls falling onto the ground without anyone getting hurt.

Some of the extras featured in the video were fans selected through the band's official web site.

The music videos were shown on MTV, VH1, and Fuse in the US, MuchMusic in Canada, and MTV Europe. It was also shown on MTV in the UK, The Music Factory in the Netherlands, MTV in Spain, MTV Central in Germany, and MTV Nordic.

=== Acoustic version ===
A music video was produced for the acoustic version. It consists solely of clips of Grohl recording the song's vocal, guitar, and piano tracks in the studio. It was co-directed by Grohl and Bill Yukich.

== Live performances ==
- An acoustic version recorded on November 29, 2002 at the BBC Radio 1 studio during The Jo Whiley Show's "Live Lounge" segment was released on the Radio 1's Live Lounge – Volume 2 compilation.
- A live version recorded on December 4, 2002 at the Oslo Spektrum in Oslo, Norway was released on the special Norwegian edition of One by One.
- The band performed the song with jazz pianist Chick Corea at the 2004 Grammy Awards.
- A live version filmed at Hyde Park on June 17, 2006 was released on the Live at Hyde Park DVD.
- An acoustic version recorded in August 2006 at Pantages Theatre was released on Skin and Bones.
- A live version recorded on July 7, 2007 at Wembley Stadium in London during Live Earth was released on the Live Earth: The Concerts for a Climate in Crisis CD.
- A live version filmed at Wembley Stadium on June 7, 2008 was released on the Live at Wembley Stadium DVD.
- The band performed the song live at the iPhone 5 launch event on September 21, 2012.
- After Dave Grohl had broken his leg in 2015, and was unable to perform at Glastonbury Festival, Florence and the Machine stepped in for the Foo Fighters and sang a rendition of the song in Grohl's honor. The Foo Fighters later managed to perform the song at Glastonbury in 2017, opening their set and dedicated it to Florence Welch.
- Foo Fighters performed the song for their second number during their 2020 appearance on Saturday Night Live.
- Performed as part of the Celebrating America broadcast for President Joe Biden's inauguration celebration on January 20, 2021.
- Performed as part of the Taylor Hawkins Tribute Concert on September 3, 2022, at Wembley Stadium. During the lyric, "It's times like these you learn to love again," Dave Grohl paused to collect his emotions.

== In media ==
The acoustic version of this song was used in episode 20 of season 4 ("The Birth and Death of the Day") of One Tree Hill during the graduation scene, which is also when Haley's water breaks.

This is also used as the theme song for a video montage showing memorable past goals at Turf Moor for all of Burnley FC's home games from 2009 to the present.

It was used by George W. Bush for his 2004 re-election campaign without the band's knowledge. "That was weird," Grohl remarked. "And to me it just seemed like a pretty good example of how completely out of touch he was. You read those lyrics: they're about hope and love and compassion. And look at his administration: war and fear and death. It was laughable. You couldn't have picked a worse song. That's why I jumped on the John Kerry campaign. I thought, 'I guess the right thing to do is to go play the song where it's needed – where it makes sense.'"

The acoustic version was used at the end of episode 21 ("Coalition of the Willing") of the American television series Jericho.

The acoustic version was used by the Calgary Flames as their opening during the team's 2003–04 NHL season cup run.

It was released as a Rock Band and Rock Band 2 DLC track on Xbox Live and PSN on December 23, 2008.

It was featured in the 2003 film American Wedding.

The song has also been featured in the trailer for the 2006 sports-comedy The Benchwarmers.

The song and the acoustic version were both featured in the 2012 ESPY Awards in a montage to commemorate the past 20 years in sports.

The song was featured in the 2007 annual WWE Tribute to the Troops.

The Washington Nationals Radio Network plays part of the track as the bridge to the post-game show after any game the Nationals win.

The Seattle Kraken of the NHL use the song when they win games at Climate Pledge Arena.

== Track listings ==
UK CD1

1. "Times Like These"
2. "A Life of Illusion" (Joe Walsh cover)
3. "Planet Claire" (The B-52's cover) (Live at New York City, New York, 31 Oct 2002 with Fred Schneider)

Enhanced Section ("Nice Hat")
Enhanced Section ("Back Slapper")

UK CD2

1. "Times Like These"
2. "Normal"
3. "Learn to Fly" (Live in Los Angeles, California, 22 Oct 2002)

Enhanced section ("Japanese Grunge")

Japan EP

1. "Times Like These"
2. "A Life of Illusion" (Joe Walsh cover)
3. "The One"
4. "Normal"
5. "Planet Claire" (The B-52's cover) (Live in New York City, New York, 31 Oct 2002 with Fred Schneider)
6. "Learn to Fly" (Live at Los Angeles 22 Oct 2002)

7" Vinyl

1. "Times Like These"
2. "A Life of Illusion" (Joe Walsh cover)

== Personnel ==
Personnel based on band members' de facto primary roles in the group.

- Dave Grohl – vocals, rhythm guitar
- Chris Shiflett – lead guitar
- Nate Mendel – bass
- Taylor Hawkins – drums

== Charts ==
=== Weekly charts ===
Chart performance for "Times Like These"
Chart (2003)	Peak position
Australia (ARIA)	22
Ireland (IRMA)	27
Netherlands (Single Top 100)	90
Quebec Airplay (ADISQ)	32
Scottish Singles Sales (Official Charts)	12
UK Singles (Official Charts)	12
UK Rock & Metal (Official Charts)	1
US Billboard Hot 100	65
US Alternative Airplay (Billboard)	5
US Mainstream Rock (Billboard)	5

== Certifications ==
Certifications for "Times Like These"
Region	Certification	Certified units/sales
Australia (ARIA)	3× Platinum	210,000^{‡}
Brazil (Pro-Música Brasil)	Gold	30,000^{‡}
Mexico (AMPROFON)	Platinum	60,000^{‡}
New Zealand (RMNZ)	Gold	15,000^{‡}
United Kingdom (BPI)	Platinum	600,000^{‡}
United States (RIAA)	Platinum	1,000,000^{‡}
^{‡} Sales+streaming figures based on certification alone.

== Release history ==
Release dates and formats for "Like a Stone"Release dates and formats for "Times Like These"
Region	Date	Format(s)	Label(s)	Ref.
United Kingdom	January 6, 2003	7-inch vinyl; CD	RCA	
United States	January 20–21, 2003	Mainstream rock; active rock; alternative radio	Roswell; RCA	

== Live Lounge Allstars charity single ==
"Times Like These"

Single by Live Lounge Allstars
- Released: 23 April 2020
- Venue: Households of various artists
- Length: 4:16
- Label: BBC; Columbia
- Songwriters: Dave Grohl; Taylor Hawkins; Nate Mendel; Chris Shiflett
- Producers: Fraser T. Smith (primary); Chris Price (executive)

Music video
- "Times Like These" (BBC Radio 1 Stay Home Live Lounge) on YouTube

As a response to the COVID-19 pandemic in the United Kingdom, BBC Radio 1 organised the "biggest ever" Live Lounge cover version as part of their Stay at Home project. The track was produced by Fraser T. Smith and was performed by the charity supergroup Live Lounge Allstars. Each member recorded and filmed their contribution to the song from their respective households in order to encourage social distancing. The song was released on 23 April 2020 and the video premiered as part of The Big Night In telethon.

Among various charities worldwide, profits from the single will primarily go to Children in Need and Comic Relief, as well as WHO's COVID-19 Solidarity Response Fund. Within 12 hours of the song's initial release, it gained 43,000 digital downloads and entered the top 5 on the UK Singles Chart. The song reached number 1 on its second week, earning 66,000 chart sales (78% of which were downloads). This song also became the first song produced by BBC Radio 1 to top the chart, and the first BBC release to reach number one since "Perfect Day" in 1997. A lyric video of the cover version was released on 29 April 2020.

=== Artists ===
The song was performed by the following artists (in alphabetical order):

==== Vocals ====
- AJ Tracey
- Anne-Marie
- Ben Johnston (of Biffy Clyro)
- Celeste
- Chris Martin (of Coldplay)
- Dan Smith (of Bastille)
- Dave Grohl (of Foo Fighters)
- Dermot Kennedy
- Dua Lipa
- Ellie Goulding
- Grace Carter (chorus)
- Hailee Steinfeld (chorus)
- Jess Glynne
- Luke Hemmings (of 5 Seconds of Summer)
- Mabel
- Mike Kerr (of Royal Blood)
- Paloma Faith
- Rag'n'Bone Man
- Rita Ora
- Simon Neil (of Biffy Clyro)
- Sam Fender
- Sean Paul
- Sigrid
- Yungblud
- Zara Larsson

==== Instruments ====
- Ben Johnston (of Biffy Clyro) – percussion
- Ben Thatcher (of Royal Blood) – percussion
- Chris Martin (of Coldplay) – piano
- Chris Wood (of Bastille) – glockenspiel
- Dave Grohl (of Foo Fighters) – drums
- Ellie Goulding – acoustic guitar
- Fraser T. Smith – guitar, percussion, piano
- James Johnston (of Biffy Clyro) – bass
- Luke Hemmings (of 5 Seconds of Summer) – acoustic guitar
- Sigrid – piano
- Simon Neil (of Biffy Clyro) – acoustic guitar, electric guitar, violin
- Taylor Hawkins (of Foo Fighters) – drums, percussion
- Yungblud – acoustic guitar

=== Charts ===
Chart performance for "Times Like These"
Chart (2020)	Peak position
Belgium (Ultratip Bubbling Under Flanders)	39
Canada (Hot Canadian Digital Songs)	8
Euro Digital Song Sales (Billboard)	2
Ireland (IRMA)	64
Netherlands (Dutch Top 40 Tipparade)	15
New Zealand Hot Singles (RMNZ)	5
Scottish Singles Sales (Official Charts)	1
UK Singles (Official Charts Company)	1
US Hot Rock & Alternative Songs (Billboard)	12
US Digital Song Sales (Billboard)	18
US Rock & Alternative Airplay (Billboard)	31

=== Certifications ===
Certifications for "Times Like These"
Region	Certification	Certified units/sales
United Kingdom (BPI)	Silver	200,000^{‡}
^{‡} Sales+streaming figures based on certification alone.

== Other notable covers ==
- Glen Campbell recorded the song for his 2008 album Meet Glen Campbell.
- Ryan Adams performed acoustic covers of the song during a 2008 tour of Europe, and has continued to occasionally cover it live both with a backing band and solo since.
- R&B singer JoJo performed an acoustic cover on BBC Radio 1 Live Lounge, playing the verses and chorus without the sections in 7/4 time.
- American band Shinedown covered the song on their 2011 live album Somewhere in the Stratosphere.
- Florence and the Machine performed a cover during Glastonbury 2015 as a tribute to the Foo Fighters, whom they'd replaced as headliners after Dave Grohl broke his leg.
- Trance DJ and producer Ciaran McAuley recorded the song in collaboration with vocalist Roxanne Emery under their HØLY WATERS alias.
