= Have It All (Foo Fighters song) =

- Standard artwork

Single by Foo Fighters

from the album One by One
- B-side: "Darling Nikki"
- Released: September 22, 2003
- Recorded: May 2002
- Length: 4:58
- Label: Roswell/RCA
- Songwriters: Dave Grohl; Taylor Hawkins; Nate Mendel; Chris Shiflett
- Producers: Foo Fighters; Nick Raskulinecz

Foo Fighters singles chronology
"Low" (2003)	"Have It All" (2003)	"Best of You" (2005)

"Have It All" is a song by American rock band Foo Fighters from their fourth studio album, One by One (2002). It was released as the fourth and final single from the album on September 22, 2003, by RCA Records. Its B-side, a cover of Prince's "Darling Nikki", became successful at US alternative radio, peaking at number 15 there. The single artwork was designed by artist Raymond Pettibon.

== Live performances ==
"Have It All" was played often on the One by One tour. It was played occasionally on the In Your Honor tour before disappearing entirely. It was not played again until the Sonic Highways tour in 2015. The song once again disappeared from sets until 2025 where it made a few appearances.

== Track listing ==
1. "Have It All"
2. "Darling Nikki" (Prince cover)
3. "Disenchanted Lullaby" (live, acoustic Radio1 UK, 19 August 2003)
4. "Weenie Beenie" (live)
- "Weenie Beenie" (live) was a misprint on the inlay on the US version of the CD, meaning all CDs only include "Have It All", "Darling Nikki", and "Disenchanted Lullaby" (live, acoustic Radio1 UK, 19 August 2003).

== Personnel ==
Personnel based on the band members' de facto primary roles in the group.

- Dave Grohl – vocals, rhythm guitar
- Chris Shiflett – lead guitar
- Nate Mendel – bass
- Taylor Hawkins – drums

== Chart positions ==
A-side: "Have It All"

Chart (2003)	Peak position
Australia (ARIA)	71
Australia Heavy Rock & Metal (ARIA)	5
UK Singles (Official Charts)	37
UK Rock & Metal (Official Charts)	8

B-side: "Darling Nikki"

Chart (2003)	Peak position
US Alternative Airplay (Billboard)	15

== Release history ==
Release dates and formats for "Like a Stone"Release dates and formats for "Have It All"
Region	Date	Format(s)	Label(s)	Ref.
United Kingdom	September 22, 2003	CD	RCA	
