= Leave No Ashes =

Studio album by Burning Brides
- Released: June 29, 2004
- Genre: Hard rock
- Length: 44:05
- Label: V2
- Producer: George Drakoulias; Dimitri Coats

Burning Brides chronology
Fall of the Plastic Empire (2001)	Leave No Ashes (2004)	Hang Love (2007)

Professional ratings
Review scores
Source	Rating
AllMusic	4/5 stars
Stylus Magazine	B−

Leave No Ashes is the second album by the American hard rock band Burning Brides. It was released on June 29, 2004, on V2.

== Track listing ==
All tracks are written by Dimitri Coats.

No.	Title	Length
1.	"Heart Full of Black"	3:15
2.	"Come Alive"	3:35
3.	"Alternative Teenage Suicide"	2:43
4.	"King of the Demimonde"	5:31
5.	"Century Song"	3:12
6.	"Dance With the Devil"	4:23
7.	"Leave No Ashes"	3:27
8.	"To Kill a Swan"	4:55
9.	"Pleasure in the Pain"	3:55
10.	"From You"	2:29
11.	"Last Man Standing"	2:45
12.	"Vampire Waltz"	4:45

== Personnel ==
- Dimitri Coats - electric guitar, vocals
- Melanie Coats - bass
- Jason Kourkounis - drums
