= Free LSD =

Studio album by Off!
- Released: September 30, 2022
- Genres: Hardcore punk; psychedelic punk; stoner rock
- Length: 38:13
- Label: Fat Possum

Off! chronology
Wasted Years (2014)	Free LSD (2022)

Singles from Free LSD
- 1. "War Above Los Angeles" Released: July 30, 2022

Free LSD is the third and final studio album by hardcore punk band Off!. It was released on September 30, 2022, by Fat Possum Records. It is their first album in eight years, and the follow-up to 2014's Wasted Years.

The album is used as the soundtrack to a science fiction movie of the same name released in 2023, written and directed by guitarist Dimitri Coats, with band members in starring roles.

== Background ==
On July 30, 2022, Off! announced the release of their first album in eight years, along with the single "War Above Los Angeles". The single's music video features appearances by David Yow, Don Nguyen, Chloe Dykstra, James Duval, and D.H. Peligro in his final recording before his death.

== Tour ==
In support of the album, the band announced a North American tour, starting on October 24, 2022, at the Valley Bar in Phoenix, Arizona, and finishing on December 17, 2022, at the Lodge Room in Los Angeles, California.

However, on October 24, 2022, Off! announced they had to postpone the tour due to drummer Justin Brown having to be hospitalized.

== Critical reception ==
Professional ratings
Aggregate scores
Source	Rating
Metacritic	85/100
Review scores
Source	Rating
AllMusic	4/5 stars
Metal Injection	8.5/10
Under the Radar	8/10
Punknews.org	4.5/5 stars

Free LSD was met with "universal acclaim" reviews from critics. At Metacritic, which assigns a weighted average rating out of 100 to reviews from mainstream publications, this release received an average score of 85, based on 5 reviews.

== Track listing ==
All tracks are written by Dimitri Coats and Keith Morris.

Free LSD track listing
No.	Title	Length
1.	"Slice Up the Pie"	2:38
2.	"Time Will Come"	2:28
3.	"War Above Los Angeles"	2:55
4.	"Kill to Be Heard"	1:36
5.	"F"	1:18
6.	"Invisible Empire"	2:04
7.	"Circuitry's God"	1:45
8.	"Ignored"	2:42
9.	"Black Widow Group"	1:50
10.	"L"	1:04
11.	"Muddy the Waters"	1:13
12.	"Murder Corporation"	2:25
13.	"Behind the Shifts"	1:52
14.	"Worst Is Yet to Come"	2:11
15.	"S"	0:57
16.	"Suck the Bones Dry"	2:01
17.	"Smoking Gun"	2:01
18.	"Peace or Conquest"	1:35
19.	"Free LSD"	2:30
20.	"D"	1:08

== Personnel ==
Band

- Keith Morris – vocals
- Dimitri Coats – guitar, electronics, producer
- Autry Fulbright II – bass guitar
- Justin Brown – drums

Production

- Pete Lyman – mastering
- Chad Bamford – mixing
- Raymond Pettibon – artwork
