= One by One (Foo Fighters album) =

2002 studio album by Foo Fighters

Studio album by Foo Fighters
- Released: October 22, 2002
- Recorded: May 6–18, 2002
- Studio: 606 (Alexandria, Virginia)
- Genres: Alternative rock; post-grunge; hard rock
- Length: 55:11
- Labels: Roswell; RCA
- Producers: Foo Fighters; Adam Kasper; Nick Raskulinecz

Foo Fighters chronology
There Is Nothing Left to Lose (1999)	One by One (2002)	In Your Honor (2005)

Singles from One by One
- 1. "All My Life" Released: September 24, 2002; 2. "Times Like These" Released: January 2003; 3. "Low" Released: June 23, 2003; 4. "Have It All" Released: September 22, 2003

One by One is the fourth studio album by American rock band Foo Fighters, released on October 22, 2002, through Roswell and RCA Records. Production on the album was troubled, with initial recording sessions considered unsatisfying and raising tensions between the band members. They eventually decided to redo the album from scratch during a two-week period at frontman Dave Grohl's home studio in Alexandria, Virginia. The album, which includes the successful singles "All My Life" and "Times Like These", has been noted for its introspective lyrics and a heavier, more aggressive sound compared to the band's earlier work, which Grohl said was intended to translate the energy of the Foo Fighters' live performances into a recording. This was the first Foo Fighters album recorded with guitarist Chris Shiflett as part of the band, and the first in which Grohl did not play drums, as drum duties were permanently assigned to Taylor Hawkins.

The album was a commercial success, topping the charts in Australia, Ireland, and the United Kingdom, and sold over one million copies in the United States. One by One was positively received by critics, who praised its sound and production, and won a Grammy Award for Best Rock Album in 2004, the second for the band.

== Production ==
Frontman Dave Grohl began working on new material for the band's next album as early as 2000 during the band's tour promoting There Is Nothing Left to Lose. Following the tour, the band started to compose songs for their next album in early 2001. After demo work in drummer Taylor Hawkins' home studio in Topanga, the band used the second quarter of 2001 to perform in European festivals. In August, after performing in Chelmsford's V Festival, Hawkins suffered a heroin overdose that left him in a coma for two weeks. After taking time off to recover, during which Grohl accepted an offer to play drums for the Queens of the Stone Age on their album Songs for the Deaf, the band got together in October 2001 to continue composition. During November and December, they had been recording at Grohl's Studio 606 in Alexandria, Virginia, working with both the producer for their previous album, Adam Kasper, and recording engineer Nick Raskulinecz, whom they met after he had engineered "A320" for Godzilla: The Album. Raskulinecz had just left his job at Sound City Studios, and speculated that Grohl, having found difficulty in 'finding a guy who would commit to sitting in his basement for four months', picked him for his energetic and enthusiastic nature.

The progress of the Virginia sessions started to become stale, so with six tracks finished, in January 2002 the band moved to Los Angeles' Conway Studios for a "change of scenery". 29 songs were recorded, including "The One"—featured in the film Orange County and released as a standalone single— and ten finished tracks that were considered for the upcoming album. The sessions took four months and were at the cost of over US$1,000,000. It was the first Foo Fighters album produced with Pro Tools and on which the band members have recorded separately.

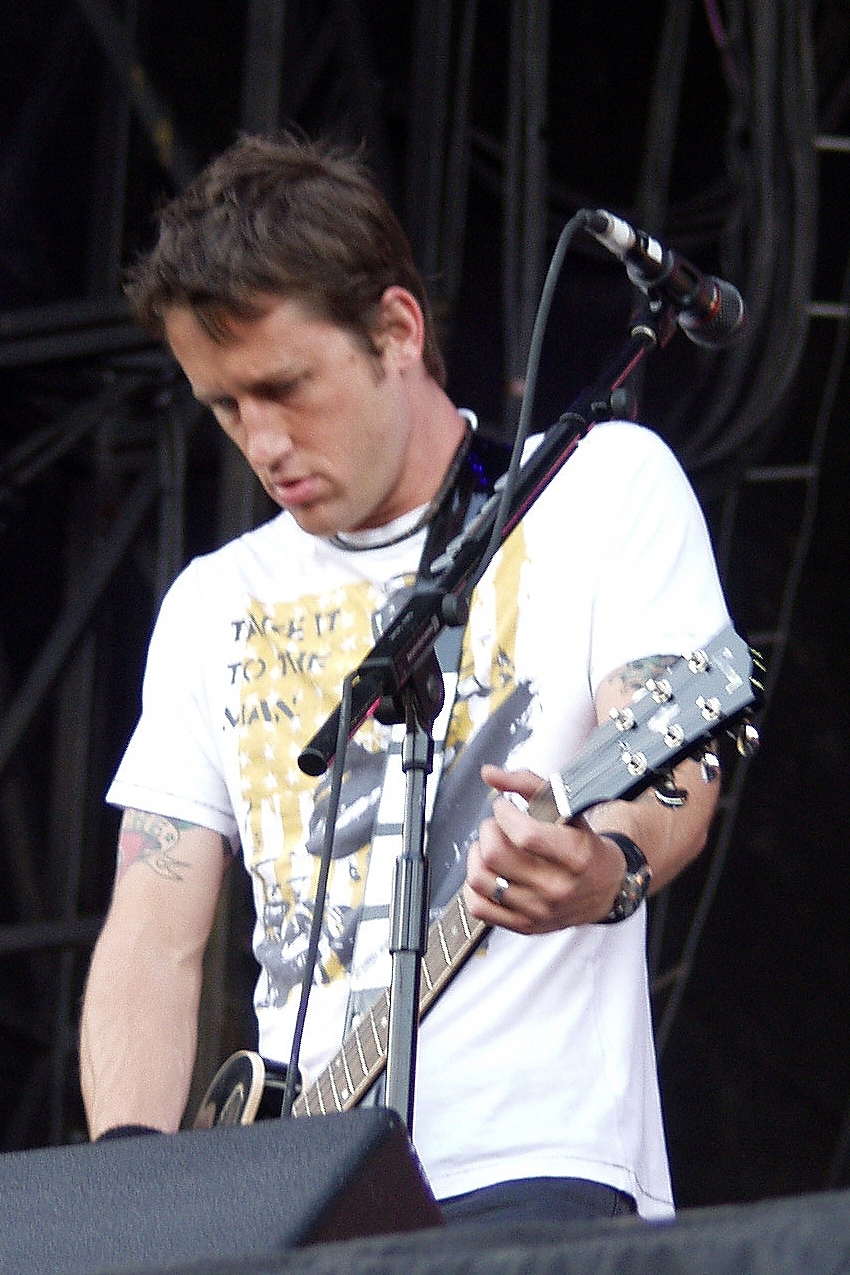
Chris Shiflett, who was making his studio debut with the Foo Fighters, described the production, which included a discarded version replaced by one done in just two weeks, as "a weird way to make a record."

The recording sessions were considered unsatisfying; Hawkins said that "nobody had their studio chops together", and Grohl considered that the band was lacking enthusiasm and were too focused on production, adding that he felt the rough mixes "sucked a lot of the life out of the songs" and "sound[e]d like another band playing our songs." Tensions were escalating, as arguments broke out at the studio, and Hawkins said he "didn't feel we were much of a band" as there was much animosity among the bandmembers. Bassist Nate Mendel said that he was in a bad attitude during the sessions due to disagreements with Grohl, and guitarist Chris Shiflett added that he felt he would at times spend whole days in the studio without playing anything.

The band also showed disappointment with the ten songs that emerged from the sessions, as Hawkins described the finished tracks as "million-dollar demos", and Grohl considered the recordings "far too clean, too tame and boring". The band only liked five of the ten songs, and thought that listeners would enjoy the other five anyway. Grohl was afraid to promote the album because of his lack of confidence in it. After manager John Silva listened to the recordings, he agreed that it was not a work that represented the band well, and that "we can release it now, but I don't know if anyone would want to buy it".

In April 2002, the band discarded the recordings and took a break. The members then each started individual projects: Grohl became the full-time Queens of the Stone Age drummer for a tour, Shiflett started the Viva Death and Jackson projects with his brother Scott and rejoined his former band Me First and the Gimme Gimmes, Hawkins played with Jane's Addiction bassist Eric Avery, and Mendel both played with Juno and reunited with his former bandmate William Goldsmith in the Fire Theft. Later on April, they reunited for the Foo Fighters' scheduled concert at the 2002 Coachella Valley Music and Arts Festival, which Grohl felt could be the last the band would perform. During the rehearsals, the tensions broke out in huge fights, especially between Grohl and Hawkins. The musicians decided to at least perform in Coachella before deciding whether to continue playing together or end the band. After enjoying their performance, the bandmembers decided to remain united and returned to re-recording the album.

"We had already spent three months and a million dollars on something that we threw away. The difference between (the original) "All My Life" and (the album version of) "All My Life" was that this one cost a million dollars and sounded like crap, [while] this one we did in my basement for half an hour and became the biggest fucking song the band ever had."

— Dave Grohl on remaking the album

Grohl decided to take a two-week period before Queens of the Stone Age went on tour to work on the Foo Fighters record, and after consulting Raskulinecz decided to promote him to producer. First, Grohl visited Hawkins in Topanga to rework the songs that had already been done and show new compositions, such as "Times Like These", "Low", and "Disenchanted Lullaby". Then Grohl and Hawkins went to Virginia to redo the drum, vocal and guitar tracks across a twelve-day period, and Mendel and Shiflett were later called to record their parts in Los Angeles' The Hook Studios, which were mostly done with the supervision of Raskulinecz, as Grohl had to go back to Queens of the Stone Age. The only remaining track from the original sessions was "Tired of You", which features a guest appearance by Queen guitarist Brian May. Two of the demos would leak online in 2012.

The title One by One—taken from a lyric on "All My Life", and for which the spelling 1 X 1 was also considered—was chosen according to Grohl because "it somehow made sense", and even worked as a reference to relationships—"one person by another person, or one after another". The singer added that the word one is frequently used in the album's lyrics, meaning either loneliness or continuation.

== Composition ==
Upon its release, One by One was considered the band's heaviest album, as Grohl described the sound as a darker and more aggressive approach as opposed to the band's usual work. Grohl said that the album mainly focused on the energy of live performances, which he attributed to both the extensive touring preceding the compositions, and the short period during which the re-recordings were done. The frontman added that although the previous albums had songs which were never played live, the track listing on One by One was compared to a set list where he would play all songs every night. The early recording sessions had manager John Silva complimenting the songs that did not sound like the band's previous work, and suggesting that Grohl "stop trying to write hit singles and go back to being weird", the band decided to be more experimental in addition to writing music meant to be played in full arenas. The variety included moody songs such as "Have It All" and "Tired of You", the seven-minute "epic opus" album closer "Come Back", and the alternating dynamics of "Halo", which drew inspiration from Tom Petty, Cheap Trick and Guided by Voices. Grohl added that the sonority tried to blend dissonance and melody: "We figured we're gonna get mean, we're gonna get ugly. And then I end up putting this four-part harmony on it, and all of sudden it's beautiful. Like 'wait a second, it was supposed to be gross, and now it's gorgeous'."

While in previous records Grohl tried to not get introspective in his lyrics, for One by One he found himself writing lyrics that matched the "emotional level we were hinting with the music", such as "Come Back", with words "revealing all these dark, shitty sides of myself". The lyrics to a song were usually done after finishing the vocal track for another. Grohl described the track listing as "11 tortured love songs", with a major theme of "surrendering to yourself", and a sequencing that described the difficult beginnings of falling in love, and then the relief of feeling comfortable in love. A major inspiration was Grohl's new girlfriend Jordyn Blum, as well as the troubled times with the band, demonstrated in "Times Like These", which laments the absence of the Foo Fighters and ponders about their future. Grohl also described "All My Life", released as a single, as representative of the album's sound for being "much more aggressive" as well as "a little darker, more romantic, creepier than anything we have done".

== Packaging and formats ==
The album artwork was done by Raymond Pettibon, who came to prominence creating album art, posters and other designs for 1980s punk bands such as Black Flag and Minutemen. Grohl was introduced to Pettibon by bassist Mike Watt and, after visiting the artist’s house, decided to hire him for the artwork because "we had to somehow pay tribute to Pettibon as a hero, because his stuff, those images just stuck with me my whole life." Grohl came up with the heart theme used in the booklet and related singles. The album was issued with two different covers, black and white. The first 575,000 units comprised a limited edition with a bonus DVD.

A limited international edition features seven bonus tracks: the outtake "Walking a Line", three live songs, and three covers, The Psychedelic Furs' "Sister Europe", the Ramones' "Danny Says"—with Shiflett on the vocals—and Joe Walsh's "Life of Illusion"—sung by Hawkins. A Norwegian version had an extra album with tracks recorded at the Oslo Spektrum on December 4, 2002. One by One was also issued as a double vinyl LP record, and a DVD-Audio with 5.1 surround sound mixes.

An Enhanced CD edition was released with weblinks to their official website and where to download free music.

== Critical reception ==
Professional ratings
Aggregate scores
Source	Rating
Metacritic	75/100
Review scores
Source	Rating
AllMusic	3/5 stars
Entertainment Weekly	A−
The Guardian	4/5 stars
Los Angeles Times	3/4 stars
NME	4/5 stars
Pitchfork	5.4/10
Q	3/5 stars
Rolling Stone	4/5 stars
Uncut	4/5 stars
The Village Voice	B−

One by One received generally positive reviews from contemporary music critics. At Metacritic, a website that assigns a normalized rating out of 100 to reviews from mainstream critics, the album received an average score of 75, based on 19 reviews. Reviewer Jon Pareles of Rolling Stone praised the "potent guitar riffs" and the introspective themes, which he called "stronger and broader than autobiography". NME's April Long felt that "even the quieter moments bristle" and considered the album an affirmation of the band's quality. Michael Paoletta of Billboard considered the album "among the band's best work" and that the themes gave the record "an emotional intimacy that makes it all more satisfying". Entertainment Weekly's Ken Tucker rated the album A−, calling it full of "unexpected exhilaration" and liking the "exploration of various relationships" on the lyrics. The Austin Chronicle reviewer praised the heavy sound of the album, saying it drifted from the light-hearted tone of songs such as "Big Me" while "retaining their melodic instincts".

However, many reviewers felt that the album was not up to the standards of the Foo Fighters' previous work. AllMusic's Stephen Thomas Erlewine said that although One by One was well-produced and played, it was too polished to "hit at a gut-level" and that the songs were "not as immediate or memorable" as the band's earlier compositions. Writing for PopMatters, Margaret Schwartz considered the album "ultimately unsatisfying" despite its quality writing and production, particularly for not drifting much from the band's typical style. Stephen Thompson of The A.V. Club described One by One as "mostly middling, sticking to slick, pounding, functional rock that doesn't dig much deeper than the usual spleen-venting and loud-quiet brooding-to-bluster formula". BBC's Nick Reynolds found the record inconsistent, praising the first four tracks but saying the following songs did not maintain the same quality, and concluding that although One By One is a good record, it may frustrate a listener. Eric Carr of Pitchfork was very critical of the album, saying it was overproduced and the songs are "weightless, antiseptic cuts" with "skillful composition" but "lacking strength and character".

In 2004, One by One won the Grammy Award for Best Rock Album, while one year earlier at the 45th Grammy Awards "All My Life" was chosen as Best Hard Rock Performance. While the band had a positive opinion about the record following release, as Grohl said the songs were "the best we've ever written", he and the rest of the Foo Fighters eventually grew distasteful about the results. Grohl stated that he was frustrated at himself for rushing on the album: "four of the songs were good, and the other seven I've never played again in my life." Hawkins said that "if you think about things too much, they kinda get sterile, as we found out there", and Shiflett declared that "there are great songs [on One by One], and then there are... parts of great songs".

== Awards ==
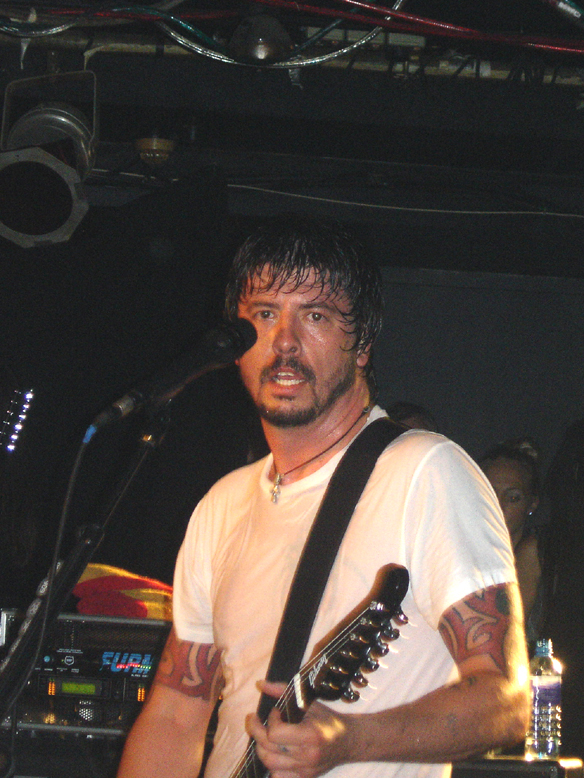
Dave Grohl (pictured) was pleased and enthusiastic with the album upon release, but he and the rest of the band changed their opinions over time.

Grammy Awards

Year	Winner	Category	Result
2003	"All My Life"	Best Hard Rock Performance	Won
2004	One by One	Best Rock Album	Won

== Commercial performance ==
One by One was released on October 22, 2002. That same day, the band began the One by One Tour with a concert at the Los Angeles Wiltern Theatre. The lead single "All My Life" had been released on September 7, and the band issued three more songs as singles in 2003: "Times Like These", "Low", and "Have It All". BMG became partners with telecom firm O2 and music provider Musiwave to promote the album in Europe with a special campaign focused on cellphones.

The album debuted at third place on the Billboard 200, with 122,000 copies sold in its first week, and spent 50 overall weeks on the chart. By 2011, One by One had sold 1.333 million units in North America, being certified Platinum by the RIAA. The international release was also successful, with RCA announcing One by One had surpassed two million copies worldwide in January 2003. The album debuted at number one in the United Kingdom, Ireland, and Australia, and outsold predecessor There Is Nothing Left to Lose in Australia, Japan and various Asian markets.

== Track listing ==
All tracks are written by Dave Grohl, Taylor Hawkins, Nate Mendel, and Chris Shiflett, except where noted.

Original release
No.	Title	Length
1.	"All My Life"	4:23
2.	"Low"	4:28
3.	"Have It All"	4:58
4.	"Times Like These"	4:26
5.	"Disenchanted Lullaby"	4:32
6.	"Tired of You"	5:12
7.	"Halo"	5:06
8.	"Lonely as You"	4:36
9.	"Overdrive"	4:30
10.	"Burn Away"	5:00
11.	"Come Back"	7:50
Total length:		55:11

Japanese Edition bonus track
No.	Title	Writer(s)	Length
12.	"Danny Says" (Ramones cover)	Joey Ramone	2:58

Special Fan-Package bonus tracks
No.	Title	Writer(s)	Length
12.	"Walking a Line"		3:56
13.	"Sister Europe" (The Psychedelic Furs cover)	John Ashton, Tim Butler, Richard Butler, Vince Ely, Duncan Kilburn, Roger Morris	5:10
14.	"Danny Says" (Ramones cover)	Joey Ramone	2:58
15.	"Life of Illusion" (Joe Walsh cover)	Joe Walsh, Kenny Passarelli	3:40
16.	"For All the Cows" (live in Amsterdam)	Grohl	3:40
17.	"Monkey Wrench" (live at The Chapel – Melbourne, Australia)	Grohl, Mendel, Pat Smear	4:02

Special limited edition bonus disc
No.	Title	Writer(s)	Length
1.	"Walking a Line"		3:56
2.	"Sister Europe" (The Psychedelic Furs cover)	John Ashton, Tim Butler, Richard Butler, Vince Ely, Duncan Kilburn, Roger Morris	5:10
3.	"Danny Says" (Ramones cover)	Joey Ramone	2:58
4.	"Life of Illusion" (Joe Walsh cover)	Joe Walsh, Kenny Passarelli	3:40
5.	"For All the Cows" (live in Amsterdam)	Grohl	3:40
6.	"Monkey Wrench" (live at The Chapel – Melbourne, Australia)	Grohl, Mendel, Smear	4:02
7.	"Next Year" (live at The Chapel – Melbourne, Australia)	Grohl, Mendel, Hawkins	4:12

Special Norwegian edition bonus disc
No.	Title	Writer(s)	Length
1.	"Snoof" (live in Norway, 2002)		4:23
2.	"Times Like These" (live in Norway, 2002)		4:32
3.	"Low" (live in Norway, 2002)		4:38
4.	"Aurora" (live in Norway, 2002)	Grohl, Mendel, Hawkins	9:06
5.	"Monkey Wrench" (live in Norway, 2002)	Grohl, Mendel, Smear	8:21

=== Special edition DVD ===
The album was also originally released with a limited edition bonus DVD which contains:

- "All My Life" video / 5.1 audio / stereo audio versions
- "Walking a Line" video / 5.1 audio / stereo audio versions
- "The One" 5.1 audio / stereo audio versions
- Extras – making of video + other clips
- DVD-ROM – screensavers, buddy icons & weblinks
- Photo gallery

== Personnel ==
Adapted from the liner notes. (Note: The band members' instruments are not credited in the album's liner notes. Their primary instruments are listed based on their de facto primary roles in the group.)

=== Foo Fighters ===
- Dave Grohl – vocals, rhythm and lead guitar, production
- Taylor Hawkins – drums, production, lead vocals on "Life of Illusion"
- Nate Mendel – bass guitar, production
- Chris Shiflett – lead and rhythm guitar, production, lead vocals on "Danny Says"

=== Additional musicians ===
- Brian May – guitar on "Tired of You"
- Krist Novoselic – backing vocals on "Walking a Line"
- Gregg Bissonette – drums on "Danny Says"

=== Production ===
- Nick Raskulinecz – producer and engineer (all except "Tired of You")
- Adam Kasper – producer and engineer on "Tired of You"
- Jim Scott – mixing
- A.J. Lara – mastering
- Bob Ludwig – mastering, mixing
- Bob Michaels – mastering
- A.J. Lara – digital editing
- Eddie Escalante – authoring
- Rupesh Pattni – graphic design
- Anton Corbijn – photography
- Joshua White – photography, illustrations
- Raymond Pettibon – artwork, illustrations
- Hiro Arishima – liner notes

== Charts ==
=== Weekly charts ===
2002–2003 weekly chart performance
Chart (2002–2003)	Peak position
Australian Albums (ARIA)	1
Austrian Albums (Ö3 Austria)	19
Belgian Albums (Ultratop Flanders)	22
Belgian Albums (Ultratop Wallonia)	24
Canadian Albums (Billboard)	3
Danish Albums (Hitlisten)	20
Dutch Albums (Album Top 100)	12
European Albums (Music & Media)	4
Finnish Albums (Suomen virallinen lista)	5
French Albums (SNEP)	26
German Albums (Offizielle Top 100)	5
Irish Albums (IRMA)	1
Italian Albums (FIMI)	35
Japanese Albums (Oricon)	9
New Zealand Albums (RMNZ)	3
Norwegian Albums (VG-lista)	2
Scottish Albums (Official Charts)	1
Swedish Albums (Sverigetopplistan)	3
Swiss Albums (Schweizer Hitparade)	28
UK Albums (Official Charts)	1
US Billboard 200	3
US Billboard Top Internet Albums	3

=== Year-end charts ===
2002 year-end chart performance
Chart (2002)	Position
Australian Albums (ARIA)	46
Canadian Albums (Nielsen SoundScan)	118
Canadian Alternative Albums (Nielsen SoundScan)	35
Canadian Metal Albums (Nielsen SoundScan)	17
UK Albums (OCC)	56

2003 year-end chart performance
Chart (2003)	Position
Australian Albums (ARIA)	37
Belgian Alternative Albums (Ultratop Flanders)	47
UK Albums (OCC)	62
US Billboard 200	95

== Certifications ==
Certifications for One by One
Region	Certification	Certified units/sales
Australia (ARIA)	2× Platinum	140,000^{^}
Brazil (Pro-Música Brasil)	Gold	50,000^{*}
Canada (Music Canada)	Platinum	100,000^{^}
Finland (Musiikkituottajat)	Gold	15,091
Germany (BVMI)	Gold	150,000^{‡}
Japan (RIAJ)	Gold	100,000^{^}
New Zealand (RMNZ)	Gold	7,500^{^}
Norway (IFPI Norway)	Gold	20,000^{*}
Sweden (GLF)	Gold	30,000^{^}
United Kingdom (BPI)	3× Platinum	892,000
United States (RIAA)	Platinum	1,000,000^{^}
^{*} Sales figures based on certification alone.^{^} Shipments figures based on certification alone.^{‡} Sales+streaming figures based on certification alone.
