= Burning Brides =

American band

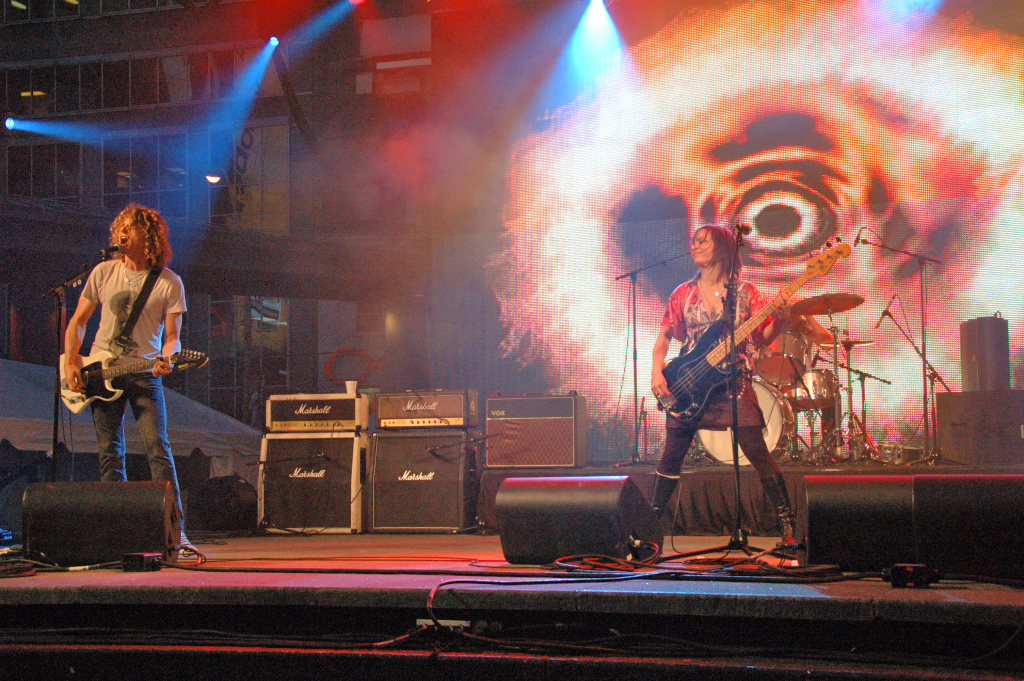
- The band in 2009 at NXNE Music Festival in Toronto.

Background information
- Origin: Philadelphia, Pennsylvania
- Genres: Hard rock, heavy metal, stoner rock
- Years active: 1999–2014
- Labels: V2, Caroline, Cobraside, File 13
- Past members: Dimitri Coats; Melanie Coats; Mike Ambs; Jason Kourkounis; Pete Beeman

Burning Brides was an American hard rock band. They were partially known for their live performances, such as selected dates as the opening band for The White Stripes in 2000. In 2002 they toured with …And You Will Know Us by the Trail of Dead and Queens of the Stone Age, in 2003 with Audioslave, in 2004 with A Perfect Circle, in 2005 with Mastodon, and in 2006 with Eagles of Death Metal and Peaches. They also opened for both Melvins and Marilyn Manson in their home town of Philadelphia, Pennsylvania.

== History ==
Burning Brides formed in Philadelphia in early 1999. Dimitri Coats and future wife and musical partner Melanie Coats joined together after Melanie graduated from The Juilliard School for modern dance. Dimitri dropped out of the acting program two years earlier to pursue music. They spent several years traveling the country together, living in Portland, Oregon and Boston before settling in Philadelphia.

The couple soon found drummer Mike Ambs and headlined their first concert May 11, 1999 at The Khyber in Philadelphia. The Brides saw popularity from their local live performances, and record companies began scouting them in order to sign them to a label. They first signed with File Thirteen Records, a local independent label. Burning Brides then took U.S. tours with such acts as Mike Watt, J. Mascis, Royal Trux, and The White Stripes. The band began to build a steady fan base from their energetic live shows.

Burning Brides' first album, Fall of the Plastic Empire was released on April 17, 2001. The album grabbed the attention of a few music magazines, writing that Burning Brides were a garage rock band on the verge. After a successful showcase at SXSW in 2002, the band found themselves in a major label bidding war. Mike Ambs departed the band during this time, and subsequently joined Philadelphia garage rockers, The Three 4 Tens. With a new drummer, Jason Kourkounis, formerly of The Delta 72 and Hot Snakes, they eventually signed with V2 Records who re-released Fall of the Plastic Empire in 2002, giving it much more media attention, thus giving the Brides some international popularity. The New Musical Express rated the album five out of five. The biggest hit off the album was "Arctic Snow," the band's first single, which they performed on Late Night with Conan O'Brien. The Brides continued touring with such bands as My Morning Jacket, Audioslave, and joined 2003's Lollapalooza traveling music festival.

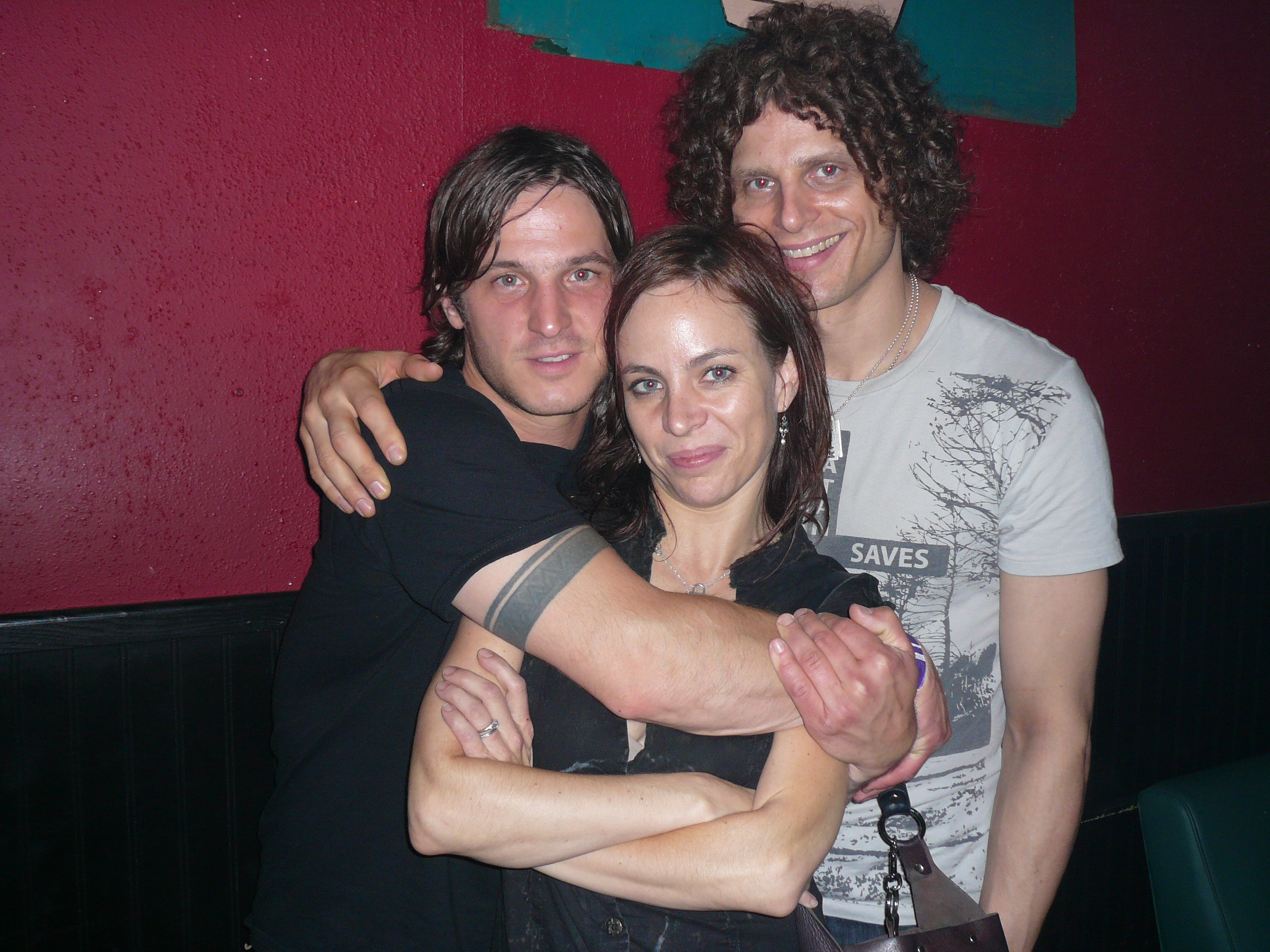
Left to right: Pete Beeman, Melanie Coats, and Dimitri Coats in 2007

Burning Brides' second album Leave No Ashes was released on June 29, 2004. It was produced by George Drakoulias (Tom Petty, Black Crowes). The most successful song off the album, "Heart Full of Black" received some radio airplay and was featured in three video games, Guitar Hero, Burnout 3: Takedown and NHL 2005. The band also returned to Late Night with Conan O'Brien to perform the song. The Brides went on to tour with such bands as A Perfect Circle, and Mastodon.

After the collapse of V2 Records the band moved to Los Angeles and released their third album, Hang Love, independently on June 19, 2007 to some critical acclaim. Pete Beeman, formerly of Guzzard, became the band's new drummer. Dimitri Coats produced the album. The band teamed with engineer Mathias Schneeberger (Joseph Arthur, St. Vitus, Mark Lanegan), whom Dimitri and Melanie met while contributing tracks to Lanegan’s 2004 Bubblegum album. Hang Love was recorded at Shneeberger’s Arcadia, CA studio.

Dimitri and Melanie Coats married in 2006. Dimitri played guitar on Chris Cornell's 2007 album Carry On and performed with Chris on The Tonight Show with Jay Leno. Burning Brides' fourth album Anhedonia was released independently on June 10, 2008. It was produced by Dimitri Coats and mixed by Matt Hyde (Monster Magnet, Slayer). Two songs from the album, "If One Of Us Goes Further" and "Flesh And Bone" are featured in the 2009 film Suck, a rock and roll vampire comedy starring Malcolm McDowell, Alice Cooper, and Iggy Pop. Dimitri Coats plays the role of Queeny, the lead villain vampire. Dimitri also acted in the independent film Passenger Side, which premiered at the 2009 Los Angeles Film Festival.

In November 2008, Dimitri and Melanie announced the arrival of their first child, Veronica Coats. In the summer of 2009, The Brides played several showcases at North by Northeast and toured Quebec to support the Canadian release of Anhedonia.

At the end of 2009, Dimitri formed the hardcore punk band Off! with Keith Morris, Steven Shane McDonald, and Mario Rubalcaba.

In early 2010, Dimitri and Melanie welcomed the arrival of their second child, Charles Coats.

In 2014, Dimitri and Melanie separated and ended the band.

== Personnel ==
=== Former members ===
- Dimitri Coats – guitar, vocals (1999–2014)
- Melanie Coats – bass guitar (1999–2014)
- Mike Ambs – drums (1999–2002)
- Jason Kourkounis – drums (2002–05)
- Pete Beeman – drums (2005–08)

== Discography ==
- Fall of the Plastic Empire (2001)
- Leave No Ashes (2004)
- Hang Love (2007)
- Anhedonia (2008)

=== Singles ===
List of singles, with selected chart positions, showing year released and album name
Title	Year	Peak chart positions	Album
Title	Year	US Rock	Album
"Heart Full of Black"	2004	32	Leave No Ashes
