= Off! =

American hardcore punk supergroup

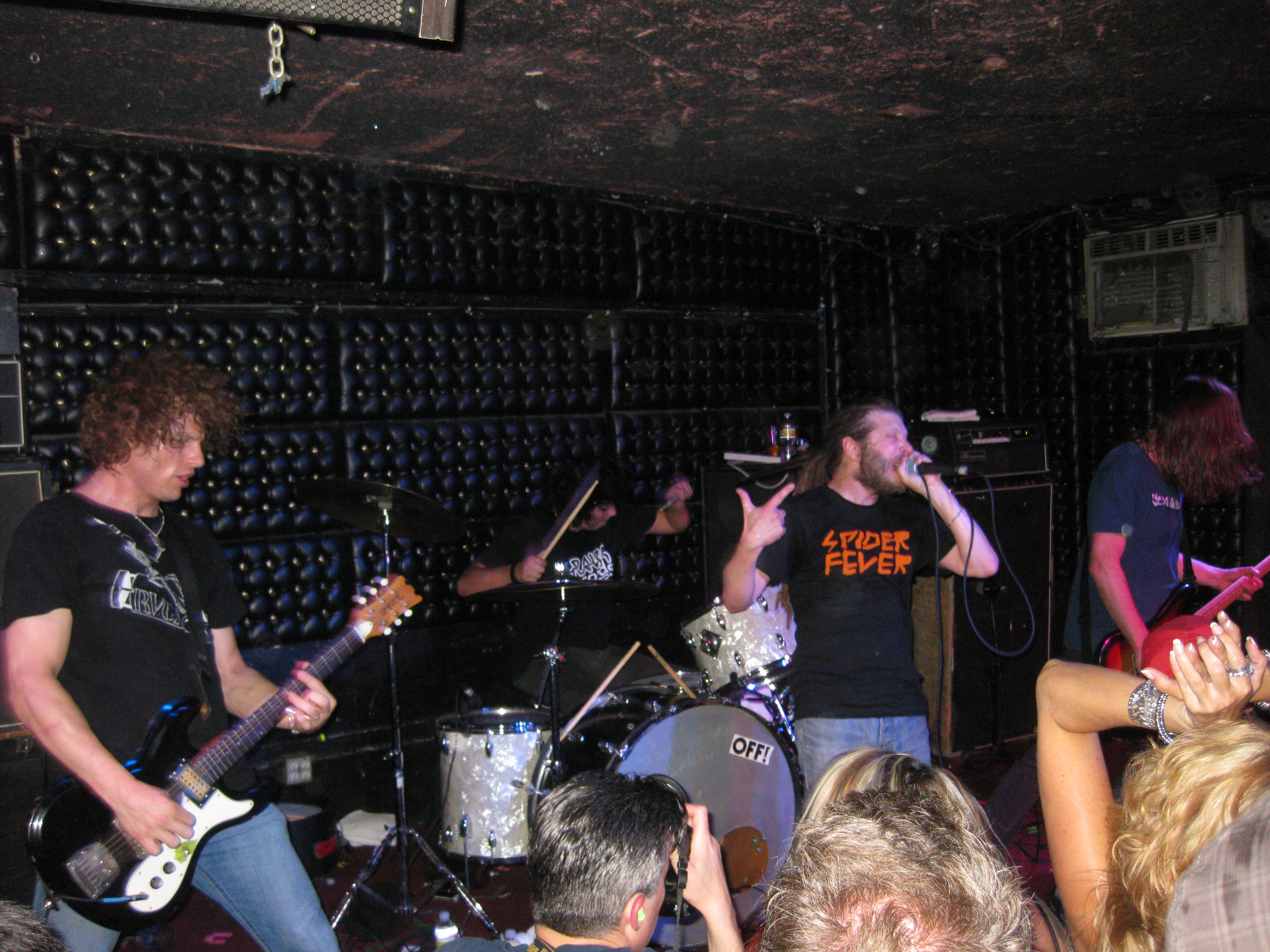
- Left to right: Coats, Rubalcaba, Morris, and McDonald in 2012

Background information
- Origin: Los Angeles, California, U.S.
- Genres: Hardcore punk
- Years active: 2009–2024
- Labels: Fat Possum; Vice
- Spinoff of: Black Flag, Circle Jerks, Redd Kross, Burning Brides, Rocket From The Crypt, Hot Snakes
- Past members: Keith Morris; Dimitri Coats; Autry Fulbright II; Mario Rubalcaba; Steven Shane McDonald; Justin Brown

Off! (stylized as OFF!) was an American hardcore punk supergroup, formed in Los Angeles, California in late 2009 by Circle Jerks/Black Flag singer Keith Morris, Burning Brides frontman Dimitri Coats, Redd Kross bassist Steven Shane McDonald, and Rocket From The Crypt/Hot Snakes drummer Mario Rubalcaba. In 2021, it was announced that the line-up had changed, with McDonald and Rubalcaba replaced by Autry Fulbright II and Justin Brown, respectively. The band were known for playing short, intense punk songs, with Pitchfork describing the band as "a vital blast of classic hardcore."

== History ==
The idea to form the band came after Coats had worked as producer on a prospective Circle Jerks album which ultimately fell apart. During that time, Coats and Morris had written several songs together which they used to start Off!. The group made its live debut at the 2010 South By Southwest Music Festival in Austin, Texas. Off!'s first Los Angeles show featured an original art installation by Raymond Pettibon at a downtown warehouse space.

The first release by Off! was a 7" vinyl EP called 1st EP, which came out on October 13, 2010. That EP, along with three more EPs, were later released as a four 7" vinyl box set entitled First Four EPs on December 14, 2010. The collection contains sixteen songs, and featured artwork by Raymond Pettibon.

In 2012, Off! released a full-length self-titled album. In April 2014, the band released their third album, Wasted Years. Each of their albums has featured cover art by Pettibon, and each is 16 tracks long.

Anthony Kiedis of the Red Hot Chili Peppers has been one of Morris' friends for over 30 years. Morris, at one point in the '80s, filled in for Kiedis at one of the band's shows. At every date on the Red Hot Chili Peppers' I'm with You World Tour, Kiedis wore an Off! hat to promote the band. He also sported the hat in some of the band's music videos. Off! have also opened a few shows for the band. On their relationship, Morris said: "I've known Anthony since the beginning of the Red Hot Chili Peppers. Anthony and Flea are my friends, and if I want to go out and play shows with some of my friends, I'm going to. I've been playing music for over 33 years, and I have some friends that are in extremely large bands. We could go out night after night and play to people who know who we are, and that's all fan-fucking-tastic, but part of our job is to take it up a couple of notches. Those people may hate us, but maybe they'll love us. There's only one way to find out and that's to do it."

In 2019, the band announced a new feature film and accompanying soundtrack album called Watermelon. The film was scheduled to start shooting in early 2020. The film's Kickstarter, however, was ultimately unsuccessful, falling short of its $175,000 goal.

In July 2021, after over a year without any updates, the band announced via Facebook that the film was still in production but that the band has "a new rhythm section." The band at that same time released their first new song in seven years: a cover of Metallica's "Holier than Thou," which subsequently appeared on The Metallica Blacklist tribute album. A music video for the song was released, and featured appearances by David Yow of The Jesus Lizard, Angelo Moore of Fishbone, cosplayer/actress Chloe Dykstra, and writer/director/comedian Derrick Beckles, among others. The new music video also revealed the new members of the band to be Autry Fulbright II (...And You Will Know Us by the Trail of Dead) on bass and Justin Brown (Thundercat) on drums. The band also announced that they were still working on the new album, and signed with Fat Possum Records who along with their next album, also re-released their back catalog.

Off! released their fourth album, Free LSD, in September 2022. The band announced in September 2023 that Mario Rubalcaba was re-joining the band as drummer. Off! later announced the following year that they would perform three farewell shows in July 2024 to promote the studio album and the theatrical release of their feature film, now also titled Free LSD.

== Band members ==
Final line-up

- Keith Morris – vocals (2009–2024)
- Dimitri Coats – guitar (2009–2024)
- Autry Fulbright II – bass (2021–2024)
- Mario Rubalcaba – drums (2009–2021, 2023–2024)

Former

- Steven Shane McDonald – bass (2009–2021)
- Justin Brown – drums (2021–2023)

== Discography ==
=== Studio albums ===
- Off! (2012)
- Wasted Years (2014)
- Free LSD (2022)

=== Compilation albums ===
- First Four EPs (2010)

=== Live albums ===
- Live at 9:30 Club (limited edition vinyl release) (2013)
- Live From the BBC (2015)

=== Singles ===
- 1st EP (2010)
- "Compared to What" (2011)
- Live at Generation Records (2011)
- Sugar Daddy Live Split Series Vol. 3 (split with the Taylor's) (2012)
- "Learn to Obey" (2014)
- "War Above Los Angeles" (2022)

=== Compilation appearances ===
- The Music of Grand Theft Auto V (2013)
  - Features the exclusive track "What's Next?"
- The Metallica Blacklist (2021)
  - Features the exclusive track "Holier Than Thou"

=== Music videos ===
Sept. 23, 2010	"Upside Down"	First Four EPs
Sept. 27, 2010	"Darkness"	First Four EPs
Oct. 7, 2010	"Black Thoughts"	First Four EPs
Oct. 19, 2010	"I Don't Belong"	First Four EPs
April 14, 2012	"Wiped Out"	Off!
June 10, 2012	"Cracked"	Off!
July 11, 2012	"Borrow and Bomb/I Got News For You"	Off!
Oct. 12, 2012	"Wrong"	Off!
Feb. 14, 2014	"Void You Out"	Wasted Years
March 7, 2014	"Hypnotized"	Wasted Years
May 5, 2014	"Red White and Black"	Wasted Years
July 7, 2021	"Holier Than Thou"	The Metallica Blacklist
July 27, 2022	"War Above Los Angeles"	Free LSD
