= Cerebral Ballzy =

American punk rock band

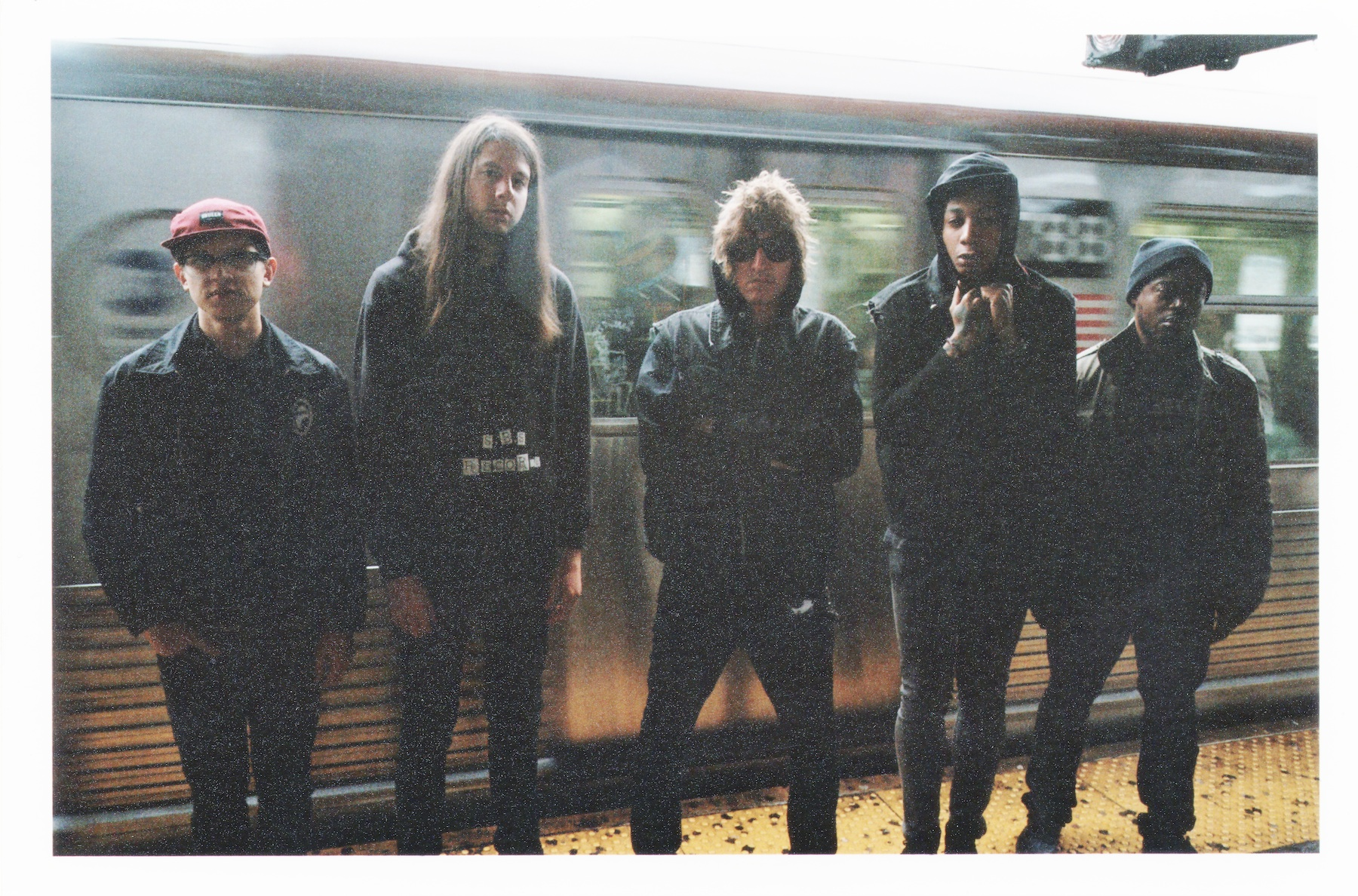
- Cerebral Ballzy

Background information
- Origin: Brooklyn, New York, United States
- Genres: Hardcore punk, skate punk
- Years active: 2008–2015
- Labels: Williams Street; Dine Alone; Moshi Moshi; Cooking Vinyl; Vinyl Junkie; Cult Records
- Past members: Honor Titus; Melvin "Mel" Honore; Mason; Jason Bannon; Tom Kogut
- Website: cerebralballzy.com

Cerebral Ballzy is an American punk rock band from Brooklyn, New York, United States. The band was formed in 2008 and released their debut, self-titled, album on 26 July 2011. The album was released in full as an online preview on the Revolver magazine website.

Cerebral Ballzy are known for their love of 1980s punk, along with a keen interest in drinking, girls, pizza and skateboarding. The band has received praise for their debut single "Insufficient Fare" and their energetic live performances. According to lead singer Honor Titus, the name Cerebral Ballzy came from a friend who dropped a slice of pizza on a train track and picked it up. Honor said "That was ballsy" and his friend replied "Cerebral Ballsy!", a play on the congenital disorder cerebral palsy. Titus is the son of rapper Andres "Dres" Titus, of the acclaimed alternative hip hop duo Black Sheep.

The band has completed a tour of the United States and played major European festivals including Hevy Music Festival, Sonisphere Festival, Lowlands, Pukkelpop, Soundwaves, Roskilde, Eurockéennes and Latitude. They played at the Summer Sonic Festival in Japan and the Reading and Leeds festivals in the United Kingdom in August 2011, headlined the 2013 NME Radar Tour, and have played with Flag, Black Lips, The Horrors, Japanther, GBH, The King Blues and FEAR. In 2013, Cerebral Ballzy were signed to Julian Casablancas's label Cult Records.

The band disbanded in 2015.

== Discography ==
=== Albums ===
==== Studio albums ====
Title	Album details	Notes
Cerebral Ballzy	Released: 26 July 2011; Label: Williams Street Records; Format: CD, LP, digital download	
Jaded & Faded	Released: 17 June 2014; Label: Cult Records	Produced by Dave Sitek

==== Extended plays ====
Title	Album details	Notes
You're Idle	Released: 2010; Format: 7" vinyl	4-track limited to 500 copies
Return of the Slice	Released: 9 March 2011; Format: CD, digital download	9-track Japanese EP
The Grip (EP)	Released: 12 April 2011; Format: Audio cassette	6-track limited to 1000 copies

==== Live albums ====
Title	Album details	Notes
Live in Toronto 06/19/09	Released: 2009; Format: Audio cassette	9-track limited to 100 copies
Live at the Macbeth, London 7th May 2011	Released: 2011; Format: Audio cassette	13-track limited to 100 copies
Live at the Detroit Bar, Costa Mesa, CA 7th February 2011	Released: 2011; Format: 7" Vinyl	6-track limited to 700/200/100

=== Singles ===
Release date	Title	Format	Released In		From Album
Release date	Title	Format	US	UK	From Album
29 November 2010	"Insufficient Fare" (Still in Love)	7" Vinyl		*	Cerebral Ballzy
7 June 2011	"Insufficient Fare"	Digital Download	*		Cerebral Ballzy
19 June 2011	"Cutting Class"	Digital Download		*	Cerebral Ballzy
5 July 2011	"Junky For Her"	Digital Download	*		Cerebral Ballzy
6 August 2013	"Another Day"	Digital Download	*	*	Jaded & Faded
6 August 2013	"City's Girl"	7" Vinyl	*	*	Jaded & Faded

== Music videos ==
Released	Title	Director
24 May 2010	"Insufficient Fare"	Mason James/Evan Wunsch
12 April 2011	"Don't Tell Me What To Do"	The Marshall Darlings
6 June 2011	"Drug Myself Dumb"	Mason & Julian Gilbert
2 August 2011	"Junky For Her"	Vice Cooler
2 August 2011	"Cutting Class"	The Marshall Darlings
August 2011	"On The Run"	
14 August 2013	"Another Day"	

== Past members ==
- Honor Titus – lead vocals
- Melvin Honore (Mel) – bassist
- Jason Bannon – guitarist
- Tom Kogut – drummer
- Abraham Sanabria – drummer
