= Dimitri Coats =

Musician

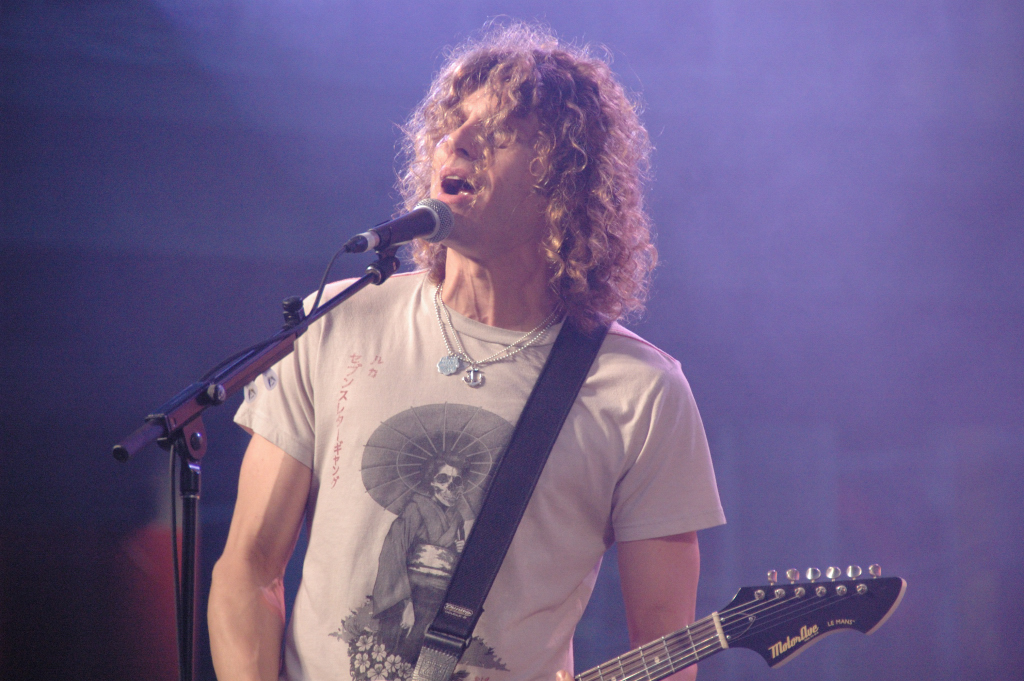
- Dimitri Coats performing with Burning Brides on September 11, 2009.

Background information
- Genres: Rock, punk rock
- Occupations: Musician, songwriter, producer, filmmaker, actor
- Instruments: Vocals, guitar
- Years active: 1990s–present

Dimitri Coats is an American musician, songwriter, producer, filmmaker, and actor.

== Music ==
Coats fronted the rock band Burning Brides and is the guitarist in the hardcore punk band Off!. The Brides released four critically acclaimed albums and toured with a variety of well-known acts ranging from the White Stripes and My Morning Jacket to Mastodon and Queens of the Stone Age. Dimitri was the songwriter and producer of the band which he formed with bass player Melanie Campbell in 1999, a few years after he dropped out of the Juilliard School's acting program.

Coats twice performed on Conan O'Brien with Burning Brides and his songs have been featured in several films, TV shows, and video games such as Guitar Hero and Grand Theft Auto V.

Dimitri played guitar on Chris Cornell's 2007 album, Carry On and performed the theme song to the 2006 James Bond film, Casino Royale with Chris on The Tonight Show with Jay Leno. Coats also played drums, guitar, and piano on two songs on Mark Lanegan's Bubblegum album.

In late 2009, Dimitri and Circle Jerks/Black Flag frontman Keith Morris formed the punk rock supergroup Off!. After three records, the band released the critically acclaimed album, Free LSD in 2022, along with news of a feature film counterpart of the same name. Coats has produced all of the band's releases, which he and Morris co-wrote.

Dimitri also joined Matt Cameron and Ben Shepherd from Soundgarden and Alain Johannes (Eleven) for a 2015 album project called Ten Commandos.

== Film ==
Coats' acting debut was Passenger Side (2009), which was chosen as one of Canada's top ten feature films of 2009 by the Toronto International Film Festival and also official selections of both the 2009 Los Angeles Film Festival and the 2009 London Film Festival.

His next role was Queeny, the lead villain in the rock and roll vampire comedy, Suck (2009). The film, which also stars writer/director Rob Stefaniuk, Malcolm McDowell, Dave Foley, Alice Cooper, Iggy Pop, Henry Rollins, Jessica Paré and Moby, premiered at the 2009 Toronto International Film Festival and won the People's Choice Award at the 2009 Whistler Film Festival. Two songs from the Burning Brides album, Anhedonia, are featured in the movie.

Coats wrote, directed, produced, and stars in the feature film, Free LSD, which closed the 2023 Slamdance Film Festival. The movie also stars Jack Black, Keith Morris, Autry Fulbright II, DH Peligro, David Yow, Chelsea Debo, Dana Gould, James Duval, and several actors and non-actors from the L.A. music scene. It is a sci-fi comedy about the band Off! that was released in 2024.
