= 5 Album Studio Set =

Box set by The Clash
- Released: 9 September 2013
- Recorded: 1977–1982
- Genre: Punk rock
- Label: Sony Legacy
- Producers: The Clash, Micky Foote, Sandy Pearlman, Bill Price, Guy Stevens, Jose Unidos, Lee "Scratch" Perry, Julien Temple, Don Letts

The Clash compilations and lives chronology
The Clash Hits Back (2013)	5 Album Studio Set (2013)

5 Album Studio Set is a box set collection by the Clash released in September 2013. The box contains newly re-mastered by Mick Jones of the band's first five albums on eight discs minus their final album, Cut the Crap. The albums came in vinyl replica packaging and the box was designed exclusively by the band.

The set was released simultaneously with an expanded eleven-disc box set titled Sound System and a greatest hits package titled The Clash Hits Back. They are expected to be the final releases to involve Mick Jones, who said: "I'm not even thinking about any more Clash releases. This is it for me, and I say that with an exclamation mark."

== Remastering ==
Jones said "The concept of the whole thing is best box set ever. Re-mastering's a really amazing thing. That was the musical point of it all, because there's so much there that you wouldn't have heard before. It was like discovering stuff, because the advances in mastering are so immense since the last time [the Clash catalogue] was remastered in the 90s."

All the music has been remastered from the original tapes, Jones said. "We had to bake the tapes beforehand – the oxide on them is where the music is, so if you don't put them in the oven and bake them, that all falls off, because they're so old."

The Clash's bassist Paul Simonon highlighted a guitar line on "Safe European Home", from the band's second album, Give 'Em Enough Rope, saying he'd never even heard it before. "It's probably some session musician, while I was asleep", Jones joked.

== Track listing ==
All tracks are written by Joe Strummer and Mick Jones, except where noted.

The Clash (UK Version) (1 CD)
No.	Title	Lead vocals	Length
1.	"Janie Jones"	Strummer	2:03
2.	"Remote Control"	Jones, Strummer	3:00
3.	"I'm So Bored with the USA"	Strummer	2:25
4.	"White Riot"	Strummer	1:56
5.	"Hate & War"	Jones, Strummer	2:05
6.	"What's My Name?" (written by Strummer, Jones, Keith Levene)	Strummer	1:40
7.	"Deny"	Strummer	3:03
8.	"London's Burning"	Strummer	2:12
9.	"Career Opportunities"	Strummer	1:52
10.	"Cheat"	Strummer	2:06
11.	"Protex Blue"	Jones	1:42
12.	"Police & Thieves" (written by Junior Murvin, Lee Perry)	Strummer	6:01
13.	"48 Hours"	Strummer	1:34
14.	"Garageland"	Strummer	3:12

All tracks are written by Joe Strummer and Mick Jones, except where noted. All lead vocals by Strummer, except "Stay Free" by Jones.

Give 'Em Enough Rope (1 CD)
No.	Title	Length
1.	"Safe European Home"	3:50
2.	"English Civil War" (Traditional; arranged by Jones and Strummer)	2:35
3.	"Tommy Gun"	3:17
4.	"Julie's Been Working for the Drug Squad"	3:03
5.	"Last Gang in Town"	5:14
6.	"Guns on the Roof" (written by Topper Headon, Jones, Paul Simonon, Strummer)	3:15
7.	"Drug-Stabbing Time"	3:43
8.	"Stay Free"	3:40
9.	"Cheapskates"	3:25
10.	"All the Young Punks (New Boots and Contracts)"	4:55

All tracks are written by Joe Strummer and Mick Jones, except where noted.

London Calling (2 CD)
No.	Title	Lead vocals	Length
1.	"London Calling"	Strummer	3:19
2.	"Brand New Cadillac" (written and originally performed by Vince Taylor)	Strummer	2:09
3.	"Jimmy Jazz"	Strummer	3:52
4.	"Hateful"	Strummer	2:45
5.	"Rudie Can't Fail"	Strummer, Jones	3:26
6.	"Spanish Bombs"	Strummer, Jones	3:19
7.	"The Right Profile"	Strummer	3:56
8.	"Lost in the Supermarket"	Jones	3:47
9.	"Clampdown"	Strummer, Jones	3:49
10.	"The Guns of Brixton" (written by Paul Simonon)	Simonon	3:07
11.	"Wrong 'Em Boyo" (written by Clive Alphonso; originally performed by the Rulers; including Stagger Lee)	Strummer	3:10
12.	"Death or Glory"	Strummer	3:55
13.	"Koka Kola"	Strummer	1:46
14.	"The Card Cheat"	Jones	3:51
15.	"Lover's Rock"	Strummer	4:01
16.	"Four Horsemen"	Strummer	2:56
17.	"I'm Not Down"	Jones	3:00
18.	"Revolution Rock" (written by Jackie Edwards, Danny Ray; originally performed by Danny Ray and the Revolutionaries)	Strummer	5:37
19.	"Train in Vain"	Jones	3:09

All tracks are written by The Clash, except where noted.

Sandinista! (3CD)
No.	Title	Lead vocals	Length
1.	"The Magnificent Seven"	Joe Strummer	5:28
2.	"Hitsville U.K."	Mick Jones, Ellen Foley	4:20
3.	"Junco Partner" ("writer, at present, unknown" on liner notes)	Joe Strummer	4:53
4.	"Ivan Meets G.I. Joe"	Topper Headon	3:05
5.	"The Leader"	Joe Strummer	1:41
6.	"Something About England"	Mick Jones, Joe Strummer	3:42
7.	"Rebel Waltz"	Joe Strummer	3:25
8.	"Look Here" (written by Mose Allison)	Joe Strummer	2:44
9.	"The Crooked Beat"	Paul Simonon	5:29
10.	"Somebody Got Murdered"	Mick Jones	3:34
11.	"One More Time" (written by The Clash and Mikey Dread)	Joe Strummer	3:32
12.	"One More Dub" (Dub version of "One More Time"; written by The Clash and Dread)	Instrumental	3:34
13.	"Lightning Strikes (Not Once but Twice)"	Joe Strummer	4:51
14.	"Up in Heaven (Not Only Here)"	Mick Jones	4:31
15.	"Corner Soul"	Joe Strummer	2:43
16.	"Let's Go Crazy"	Joe Strummer	4:25
17.	"If Music Could Talk" (written by The Clash and Dread)	Joe Strummer	4:36
18.	"The Sound of Sinners"	Joe Strummer	4:00
19.	"Police on My Back" (written by Eddy Grant; originally performed by The Equals)	Mick Jones	3:15
20.	"Midnight Log"	Joe Strummer	2:11
21.	"The Equaliser"	Joe Strummer	5:47
22.	"The Call Up"	Joe Strummer	5:25
23.	"Washington Bullets"	Joe Strummer	3:51
24.	"Broadway" (Features an Epilogue of "The Guns of Brixton" sung by Maria Gallagher)	Joe Strummer	5:45
25.	"Lose This Skin" (written by Tymon Dogg)	Tymon Dogg	5:07
26.	"Charlie Don't Surf"	Joe Strummer, Mick Jones	4:55
27.	"Mensforth Hill" ("Something About England" backwards with overdubs)	Instrumental	3:42
28.	"Junkie Slip"	Joe Strummer	2:48
29.	"Kingston Advice"	Joe Strummer	2:36
30.	"The Street Parade"	Joe Strummer	3:26
31.	"Version City"	Joe Strummer	4:23
32.	"Living in Fame" (Dub Version of "If Music Could Talk"; written by The Clash and Dread)	Mikey Dread	4:36
33.	"Silicone on Sapphire" (Dub version of "Washington Bullets")	Joe Strummer	4:32
34.	"Version Pardner" (Dub version of "Junco Partner")	Joe Strummer	5:22
35.	"Career Opportunities"	Luke Gallagher, Ben Gallagher	2:30
36.	"Shepherds Delight" (Dub Version of "Police & Thieves")	Instrumental	3:25

All tracks are written by The Clash, except where noted.

Combat Rock (1 CD)
No.	Title	Lead vocals	Length
1.	"Know Your Rights" (Strummer/Jones)	Joe Strummer	3:39
2.	"Car Jamming"	Joe Strummer	3:58
3.	"Should I Stay or Should I Go"	Mick Jones	3:06
4.	"Rock the Casbah" (Headon/The Clash)	Joe Strummer	3:44
5.	"Red Angel Dragnet"	Paul Simonon/Kosmo Vinyl	3:48
6.	"Straight to Hell"	Joe Strummer	5:30
7.	"Overpowered by Funk"	Joe Strummer/Futura 2000	4:55
8.	"Atom Tan"	Mick Jones/Joe Strummer	2:32
9.	"Sean Flynn"	Joe Strummer	4:30
10.	"Ghetto Defendant"	Joe Strummer/Allen Ginsberg	4:45
11.	"Inoculated City"	Mick Jones	2:43
12.	"Death Is a Star"	Joe Strummer/Mick Jones	3:13
