= The Clash Hits Back =

Greatest hits album by The Clash
- Released: 9 September 2013 (UK); 10 September 2013 (US)
- Recorded: 1977–1982
- Genre: Punk rock
- Label: Sony Legacy
- Producers: The Clash, Micky Foote, Sandy Pearlman, Bill Price, Guy Stevens, Jose Unidos, Lee "Scratch" Perry

The Clash compilations and lives chronology
Sound System (2013)	The Clash Hits Back (2013)	5 Album Studio Set (2013)

The Clash Hits Back is a 2-CD, 3-LP best of collection by the Clash released in September 2013.

The set was released simultaneously with an eleven disc box set titled Sound System along with 5 Album Studio Set, which contains the band's first five studio albums. They are expected to be the final releases to involve Mick Jones who said "I'm not even thinking about any more Clash releases. This is it for me, and I say that with an exclamation mark", Jones said.

== Background ==
The best of album is sequenced to copy the set played by the band at the Brixton Fair Deal on 10 July 1982, rounded out with big numbers that failed to make the set that night.

The Fair Deal was a special venue for the Clash, Paul Simonon told the Guardian, because of the memories it held as the cinema he and Mick Jones went to as children. "It's actually where I saw my first ever pop show", Simonon said. "We all turned up as 10-year-olds, and they said: 'Right, boys and girls, we've got a special surprise for you—we're not going to show you a film!' So everyone was: 'Booooo.' 'No. we've got a special surprise—we have Sandie Shaw!' And Sandie Shaw came on, and she was going on about not having any shoes. So we had an hour set from her, and that was my first pop concert."

The actual set the band played that evening has the song "Bankrobber" as the fifth tune, not the eighth. This is verified by audience recordings from the show. The band entered the stage to the sound of "La Resa Dei Conti (For A Few Dollars More)" by Ennio Morricone.

== Track listing ==
All songs written by Joe Strummer and Mick Jones unless otherwise noted:

=== Disc one ===
1. "London Calling" – 3:20
2. "Safe European Home" – 3:51
3. "Know Your Rights" – 3:39
4. "(White Man) In Hammersmith Palais" – 4:01
5. "Janie Jones" – 2:05
6. "The Guns of Brixton" (Paul Simonon) – 3:10
7. "Train in Vain" – 3:11
8. "Bankrobber" – 4:35
9. "Wrong 'Em Boyo" (written by Clive Alphonso; originally performed by the Rulers; including Stagger Lee) – 3:10
10. "The Magnificent Seven" (The Clash) – 5:33
11. "Police on My Back" (Grant) – 3:17
12. "Rock the Casbah" (Bob Clearmountain Mix) (Topper Headon/The Clash)– 3:42
13. "Career Opportunities" – 1:52
14. "Police & Thieves" (Junior Murvin, Lee "Scratch" Perry) – 6:00
15. "Somebody Got Murdered" (The Clash) – 3:34
16. "Brand New Cadillac" (Vince Taylor) – 2:09
17. "Clampdown" – 3:50

=== Disc two ===
1. "Ghetto Defendant" (The Clash) – 4:44
2. "Armagideon Time" (Willi Williams, Jackie Mittoo) – 3:50
3. "Stay Free" – 3:40
4. "I Fought the Law" (Sonny Curtis) – 2:39
5. "Straight to Hell" (The Clash) – 5:30
6. "Should I Stay or Should I Go" (The Clash) – 3:08
7. "Garageland" – 3:13
8. "White Riot" – 1:59
9. "Complete Control" – 3:13
10. "Clash City Rockers" – 3:56
11. "Tommy Gun" – 3:17
12. "English Civil War" (traditional, arranged by Strummer-Jones) – 2:36
13. "The Call Up" (The Clash) – 5:25
14. "Hitsville U.K." (The Clash) – 4:20
15. "This Is Radio Clash" (The Clash) – 4:11
16. "London's Burning" – 2:10 (Japan bonus track)
17. "City of the Dead" – 2:23 (Japan bonus track)

== Charts ==
Chart (2013)	Peak position
Belgian Albums (Ultratop Flanders)	120
Belgian Albums (Ultratop Wallonia)	129
French Albums (SNEP)	174
New Zealand Albums (RMNZ)	27
Scottish Albums (Official Charts)	12
UK Albums (Official Charts)	13

== Certifications ==
Region	Certification	Certified units/sales
United Kingdom (BPI)	Gold	100,000^{‡}
^{‡} Sales+streaming figures based on certification alone.
