= Rude Boy (film) =

- Directed by: Jack Hazan, David Mingay
- Written by: David Mingay, Ray Gange, Jack Hazan
- Starring: Ray Gange, The Clash
- Release date: 13 March 1980
- Running time: 133 mins 127 mins (US ver.)
- Country: United Kingdom
- Language: English

Rude Boy is a 1980 British film directed by Jack Hazan and David Mingay and filmed in 1978 and early 1979.

The film, part fiction, part rockumentary, tells the story of Ray Gange, a young Clash fan who leaves his dead-end job in a sleazy Soho sex shop to become a roadie for the band. The film also includes extensive footage of the Clash at a Rock Against Racism concert at Victoria Park, on their On Parole and Sort It Out tours, and in the studio recording the album Give 'Em Enough Rope. The film was named after the rude boy subculture and over the years won a cult following.

== Release and reception ==
It was publicly released in the UK in March 1980 with limited screenings, primarily at independent art cinemas. Although meeting with a generally unfavourable critical response, the film won the Honorable Mention, and was nominated for the Golden Bear, at the 30th Berlin International Film Festival in 1980.

It was re-released on DVD the UK in 2003 by Fremantle Media with a number of special features including interviews with 'Rude Boy' lead actor Ray Gange, the Clash's road manager Johnny Green and film makers Jack Hazan and David Mingay. There was a Blu-ray release of the film in 2015.

== Clash reaction ==
Although initially interested in the film, after having seen the rough cut, the members of The Clash became so disenchanted with it that, for its official cinema release, they had Better Badges make badges stating 'I don't want Rude Boy Clash Film'. Joe Strummer told Melody Maker in 1980: "It wasn't any good. We didn't like what they were doing with the black people, because they were showing them dipping into pockets and then they were shown being done for something and that was their only role in the film ... Who wants to propagate that? That's what the right wing use, 'all blacks are muggers' which is a load of rubbish. After that rough showing I've never seen it since and nor have any of the Clash." Strummer added that the band had no further contact with directors Dave Mingay and Jack Hazan after the film was shot, and never received any payments from them. Strummer's view changed with time, saying; "[t]hat film looks pretty good today, although at the time we fell out pretty badly with the filmmaker. After we saw it I don't think we really understood what he was going on about - maybe we got fed up with him, maybe we were all fed up with each other, having to travel around together. It all became messy in the end. But I think the film stands up well." The Clash (2008). Original Clash Book at 174,175. Dorisimo Limited. ISBN 978-0-446-53973-9.

== Cast ==
The cast included (in alphabetical order):

- Dave Armstrong as Police officer
- Barry Baker as Drum roadie
- Elsie Barnes as Fan
- Terry Barry as Police officer
- Reg Bazell as Police officer
- Lutz Becker as Sex shop customer
- Stephen Behan as Fan
- Graham Brown as Fan
- Lizard Brown as Byron, a suspect.
- Colin Bucksey as CID officer
- The Clash as Themselves
- Caroline Coon as Caroline, a Band representative.
- Cathy Crawford as Fan
- John Daly as Bouncer
- Hicky Etienne as Suspect
- Plaxy Exton as Fan
- Tig Exton as Fan
- Ian Galland as Police officer
- Ray Gange as Ray (Rude Boy)
- Ben Gaze as Police officer
- Boss Goodman as Bouncer
- John Goodridge as Police officer
- Inch Gordon as Inch, a suspect.
- Willy Graham as Fan
- Johnny Green as Johnny, the Road manager.
- Sarah Hall as Ray's girlfriend
- Vic Hardwick as Bouncer
- Topper Headon as Drummer
- Jerry Healey as Fan
- Dave Johnson as Police officer
- Mick Jones as Lead guitarist / Dicky Swindell
- Kenny Joseph as Solicitor's clerk
- Tony Martin as Police officer
- David McDonald as Fan
- Patrick McDonnell as Police officer
- Terry McQuade as Terry, Ray's mate
- Roy Menuir as Bouncer
- Berry Myers as DJ
- Tommy O'Reilley as Fan
- Lee Parker as Eel, a suspect.
- Julia Phelps as Fan
- Clare Pollock as Fan
- Jimmy Pursey as himself, guest musician on "White Riot".
- Howard Rainey as Bouncer
- Colin Richards as Sex shop customer
- Paul Simonon as Bassist
- Charlotte Smith as Fan
- Tony Smith as Fan
- Alan Stanleye as Fan
- Joe Strummer as Rhythm guitarist
- Ken Tillock as Fan
- Dave Wakefield as Police officer
- John Woods as Police officer
- John Yates as Police officer
- Elizabeth Young as Ray's girlfriend

== Songs performed ==
1. "Revolution Rock" (Jackie Edwards, Danny Ray)
  Instrumental version of album track; title song
2. "Police and Thieves" (Junior Murvin/Lee "Scratch" Perry)
  Performed by The Clash at Barbarellas, Birmingham on 1 May 1978; audio tracks re-recorded at Wessex Studios.
3. "Police and Thieves" sung by Junior Murvin (Island Records)
4. "Career Opportunities" (from The Clash album)
5. "Garageland"
  Performed by The Clash at Rehearsal Rehearsals; audio tracks re-recorded at Wessex Studios.
6. "Rudi" sung by Bob Marley (Coxsone Records)
7. "London's Burning"
  Performed live by The Clash at Open Air Carnival, Victoria Park, London on 30 April 1978; audio tracks re-recorded at Wessex Studios.
8. "White Riot"
  Performed live by The Clash at Open Air Carnival, Victoria Park, London on 30 April 1978 and featuring Jimmy Pursey from Sham 69 on vocals; audio tracks re-recorded at Wessex Studios.
9. "(White Man) In Hammersmith Palais"
  Performed live by The Clash at the Apollo, Glasgow on 4 July 1978; audio tracks re-recorded at Wessex Studios.
10. "I'm So Bored with the USA"
  Performed live by The Clash at the Apollo, Glasgow on 4 July 1978; audio tracks re-recorded at Wessex Studios.
11. "Janie Jones"
  Performed live by The Clash at the Apollo, Glasgow on 4 July 1978; audio tracks re-recorded at Wessex Studios.
12. "White Riot"
  Performed live by The Clash at the Apollo, Glasgow on 4 July 1978; audio tracks re-recorded at Wessex Studios.
13. "The Prisoner"
  Performed live by The Clash at the Civic Music Hall, Aberdeen on 5 July 1978; audio tracks re-recorded at Wessex Studios.
14. "Johnny Too Bad" sung by The Slickers (Island Records)
15. "Tommy Gun"
  Performed live by The Clash at the Kinema Ballroom, Dunfermline on 6 July 1978; audio tracks re-recorded at Wessex Studios.
16. "All the Young Punks"
  Performed by The Clash at Wessex Studios.
17. "Stay Free"
  Performed by The Clash at Wessex Studios.
18. "Complete Control"
  Performed by The Clash at the Music Machine, Camden, London on 27 July 1978; audio tracks re-recorded at Wessex Studios.
19. "Safe European Home"
  Performed by The Clash at the Music Machine, Camden, London on 27 July 1978; audio tracks re-recorded at Wessex Studios.
20. "What's My Name"
  Performed by The Clash at the Music Machine, Camden, London on 27 July 1978; audio tracks re-recorded at Wessex Studios.
21. "No Reason" (piano song)
  Performed solo by Joe Strummer at Rehearsal Studio.
22. "Let the Good Times Roll" (piano song)
  Performed solo by Joe Strummer at Rehearsal Studio.
23. "I Fought the Law" (Sonny Curtis)
  Performed live by The Clash at The Lyceum, West End, London on 28 December.
24. "Rudie Can't Fail" (from London Calling album)
  A brief extract is heard toward the end of the film, which sounds like an unfinished take of the London Calling song.
25. Also heard on soundtrack: "Wreck A Buddy" performed by The Soul Sisters.
