= Baby, Come Back (album) =

Compilation album by the Equals
- Released: 1968
- Genres: Beat music, pop rock, psychedelic funk, psychedelic soul, psychedelic pop, psychedelic rock, funk rock
- Labels: RCA Victor; LSP-4078
- Producer: Edward Kassner

Singles from Baby, Come Back
- 1. "Baby, Come Back b/w Hold Me Closer RCA Victor 47-9583 RCA Victor 47-9186 (radio station copies)"

Baby, Come Back is an album by British group the Equals, which was released in the U.S. by RCA Victor, who had obtained the rights to manufacture and distribute the album in all of the Americas from the band's British label, President Records.

The record contains tracks culled from their first three UK albums, Unequalled Equals (1967), Explosion (1968), and Sensational Equals (1968). Two of the tracks were taken from Unequalled: the UK chart-topping single "Baby, Come Back", and "Hold Me Closer". Three tracks came from Explosion: "Police On My Back", "Teardrops", and "Leaving You Is Hard To Do". The remaining six tracks came from the band's third British album, Sensational.

Because it was built around the group's biggest hit, "Baby, Come Back", this was the group's most commercially successful album in the U.S. The album is a showcase of British Invasion–era beat music.

== Track listing ==
=== Side One ===
1. "Baby, Come Back" (Eddy Grant)
2. "Reincarnation" (Derv Gordon, Grant)
3. "Police on My Back" (Grant)
4. "Teardrops" (Grant, Derv Gordon, Lincoln Gordon)
5. "The Guy Who Made Her a Star" (Tony Clarke)

=== Side Two ===
1. "Laurel and Hardy" (Grant)
2. "Soul Groovin'" (Grant)
3. "Good Times Are Gone Forever" (Grant, Patrick Lloyd)
4. "Leaving You Is Hard to Do" (Derv Gordon, Lincoln Gordon)
5. "The Skies Above" (Grant)
6. "Hold Me Closer" (Grant, Lincoln Gordon)

== Personnel ==
The Equals

- Eddy Grant - lead guitar, vocals
- Derv Gordon - lead vocals
- Lincoln Gordon - bass guitar, vocals
- Patrick Lloyd - rhythm guitar
- John Hall - drums

All song and personnel information gathered from the liner notes.

== See also ==
- Beat-Club
