= Career Opportunities =

Career Opportunities may refer to:

- "Career Opportunities" (song), a 1977 song by The Clash
- Career Opportunities (film), a 1991 American romantic comedy film
