= Viva Bobby Joe =

- Swedish picture sleeve

Single by the Equals

from the album Equals Strike Again
- B-side: "I Can’t Let You Go"
- Released: July 1969
- Genre: Pop
- Length: 3:07
- Label: President
- Songwriter: Eddy Grant
- Producer: Edward Kassner

"Viva Bobby Joe" is a hit single written by Eddy Grant and performed by the Equals and released in 1969 from the album Equals Strike Again.

The lyrics mention the titular Bobby Joe and his undefined, "funk machine" which is going to be a "sensation".

The song was taken up by football crowds in the UK who changed the lyrics to "Viva Bobby Moore" in reference to the captain of West Ham United and England at the time.

== Reception ==
In an 23 August interview with New Musical Express, Grant told Gordon Coxhill, "The record started selling so quickly that it took everybody by surprise. The factory that presses our records had gone on holiday and there was a danger that there would be a shortage for the shops." In an interview published on the same day, drummer John Hall told Melody Maker, "This chart business has really got us puzzled... I don't think 'Bobby Joe' is nearly as commercial as 'Michael [and the Slipper Tree]', but it's doing a lot better." The single debuted on the UK Singles Chart on 2 August, reaching No. 6 and staying in the chart for 14 weeks.
