= Rudie Can't Fail =

- Dutch single release

Song by the Clash

from the album London Calling
- B-side: "Bankrobber" / "Rockers Galore... UK Tour"
- Released: 14 December 1979
- Recorded: June–July 1979
- Studio: Wessex (London)
- Genre: Reggae; ska
- Length: 3:26
- Label: CBS
- Songwriters: Joe Strummer; Mick Jones
- Producer: Guy Stevens

"Rudie Can't Fail" is a song by the English rock band the Clash, featured on their third studio album London Calling (1979). The song was written by Joe Strummer and Mick Jones, who sing it as a duet.

== Composition ==
Like some songs on London Calling, "Rudie Can't Fail" has a strong reggae and rocksteady influence. Donald A. Guarisco of Allmusic described it as "an exuberant, horn-driven number that mixes pop and soul elements in to spice up its predominantly reggae sound".

== Lyrics ==
"Rudie Can't Fail" praises the rude boys of Jamaica in the 1960s who challenged their elders' status quo. The song is about a fun-loving young man who is criticised by his elders for not acting as a responsible adult, drinking beer at breakfast, and describe him as being "so crude and feckless", to which he responds "I know that my life make you nervous, but I tell you I can't live in service." The song's title derives from Desmond Dekker's 1967 song "007 (Shanty Town)", and is in homage to Ray Gange, who had portrayed a roadie who quits his job to follow the Clash around in the 1980 film Rude Boy. Rudie Can't Fail was the working title of a planned second movie for which the Clash would provide the soundtrack. Reference is made also to Dr Alimantado and his 1977 song "Born for a Purpose" in the line "Like the doctor who was born for a purpose". The line "You're looking pretty smart in your chicken skin suit", may refer to Alimantado's debut album, Best Dressed Chicken in Town.

== Live versions ==
The Clash performed the song live during their 1979-1980 London Calling tour. Joe Strummer & the Mescaleros also performed the song during the final years of Strummer's life. In 2012, Live at Acton Town Hall, a Record Store Day exclusive album, was released that featured "Rudie Can't Fail". The show was one of Strummer's final performances before his death. That same performance was also released on their Joe Strummer & the Mescaleros: The Hellcat Years 57-song digital download set in 2012. Another live version of the song from 2001 can be found on their 2021 compilation album Assembly.

== Cover versions ==
- In 1999, The Mighty Mighty Bosstones covered the song for the Burning London: The Clash Tribute tribute album.
- In 2009, Vic Ruggiero covered the song on the Meatball And Sushi Party EP.
- In 2026, Jesse Malin covered the song for his "Hollywood Forever" single.

== See also ==
- Rudy's Can't Fail Cafe, a diner in California named after the song
