= Elizabeth Young (journalist) =

English literary critic and author

Elizabeth Jesse Young (6 February 1950 – 18 March 2001) was a London-based literary critic and author, who wrote principally on cult writers for a range of British newspapers and magazines. In particular she championed transgressive fiction, for which she received some criticism in the press, not least for her defence of A. M. Homes' The End of Alice, which dealt with themes of paedophilia from what was seen as an uncomfortably neutral perspective.

== Biography ==
Born to Scottish parents in Lagos, Nigeria where her father was an executive for Rowntrees, Elizabeth Young's parents were members of the Free Church of Scotland (sometimes referred to as the Wee Frees) and she was educated at The Mount School, York where she boarded. Young discovered at the age of 11 the works of Nelson Algren, Allen Ginsberg and Jack Kerouac when an uncle sent her some books by these writers. The enduring fascination with the Beats was to stay with her. Young studied English at York University. She moved to London in the 1970s to attend a demonstration and never left.

Before becoming a literary critic, Young worked in Compendium Books in Camden Town and was noted for her Goth appearance. In addition to literary criticism, Young's attraction to the counterculture saw her pen articles on drugs, music and pornography. She also appeared as Ray Gange's girlfriend in Rude Boy, the 1980 film about a roadie for The Clash.

Young was a champion for the US cult literary scene, with authors such as Bret Easton Ellis, Dennis Cooper and A. M. Homes receiving regular praise in her reviews. She also promoted the early talents of Poppy Z. Brite. In 1992, she and Graham Cavaney published Shopping in Space: Essays on American 'Blank Generation' Fiction (Serpent's Tail), which dealt extensively with the US literary underground, from Joel Rose, David Wojnarowicz, Dennis Cooper, Catherine Texier, Mary Gaitskill, Poppy Z Brite and exploitation films. In terms of UK writers, she acted as an enthusiastic supporter of the talents of Stewart Home, Alasdair Gray, Alan Warner and Irvine Welsh.

In 2001, Young died from Hepatitis C. Later that year, a selection of her reviews and articles were collated in a volume published by Serpent's Tail, Pandora's Handbag: Adventures in the Book World, for which her friend Will Self penned the introduction. Young was buried in the family plot in the graveyard in Tighnabruaich, a village on the Kyles of Bute in Argyll and Bute, Scotland where she also owned a small cottage in the later years of her life.
