= Best dressed =

Best dressed may refer to:

- MTV Movie Award for Best Dressed
- International Best Dressed List
- Best Dressed Chicken in Town

== See also ==
- Worst dressed
