= Sandinista! =

Studio album by the Clash
- Released: 12 December 1980
- Recorded: February–May 1980; August 1980
- Studios: Pluto (Manchester); Power Station (New York City); Electric Lady (New York City); Channel One (Kingston, Jamaica); Wessex (London)
- Genres: Post-punk; experimental; dub; world; reggae punk
- Length: 144:09
- Labels: CBS; Epic
- Producer: The Clash

The Clash chronology
London Calling (1979)	Sandinista! (1980)	Combat Rock (1982)

Singles from Sandinista!
- 1. "The Call Up" Released: 28 November 1980; 2. "Hitsville UK" Released: 16 January 1981; 3. "The Magnificent Seven" Released: 10 April 1981

Sandinista! is the fourth studio album by the English rock band the Clash. It was released on 12 December 1980 as a triple album containing 36 tracks, with 6 songs on each side. It crosses various genres including funk, reggae, jazz, gospel, rockabilly, folk, dub, rhythm and blues, calypso, disco, and rap. For the first time, the band's songs were credited to the Clash as a group, rather than to Joe Strummer and Mick Jones. The band agreed to a decrease in album royalties in order to release the 3-LP at a low price.

Sandinista! was mostly well received, though there was criticism towards the large size of the triple album. Sandinista! is the lowest charting album for the Clash in their native United Kingdom. The album was influential in the punk rock movement with its experimental sound and was voted best album of the year in the Pazz & Jop critics poll in The Village Voice. In 2020 it was ranked number 323 on the Rolling Stone list of "The 500 Greatest Albums of All Time" and Slant Magazine listed the album at number 85 on its "Best Albums of the 1980s" list.

== Background and recording ==
The album was recorded over most of 1980, in London, Manchester, Jamaica and New York. It was produced by the band (primarily Mick Jones and Joe Strummer), recorded and mixed by Bill Price, and engineered by Jeremy "Jerry" Green (Wessex Sound Studios), J. P. Nichols (Electric Lady Studios), Lancelot "Maxie" McKenzie (Channel One Studios), and Bill Price (Pluto + Power Station Studios). Dub versions of some of the songs and toasting was done by Mikey Dread, who had first worked with the band for their 1980 single "Bankrobber". With Sandinista! the band reached beyond punk and reggae into dub, rhythm and blues, calypso, gospel, Jazz, and other genres. The album clearly displays the influence of reggae musician and producer Lee "Scratch" Perry (who had worked with the band on their 1977 single "Complete Control" and who had opened some of the band's shows during its stand at Bond's in New York in 1980), with a dense, echo-filled sound on even the straight rock songs.

When recording began in New York, bass guitarist Paul Simonon was busy making a film called Ladies and Gentlemen, The Fabulous Stains, and he was replaced briefly by Ian Dury and the Blockheads bassist Norman Watt-Roy; this later caused some bad feeling when Watt-Roy and keyboard player Mickey Gallagher, a fellow Blockhead, claimed they were responsible for co-composing the song "The Magnificent Seven", as the song was based on a tune of theirs. Watt-Roy and Gallagher would subsequently be given a co-writing credit. Dread, too, was upset that he was not credited as the album's producer, although he was credited with "Version Mix". Other guests on the album include singer Ellen Foley (Jones' partner at the time), guitarist Ivan Julian formerly of the Voidoids, harmonica player Lew Lewis (formerly of Eddie and the Hot Rods), and Strummer's old friend and musical collaborator Tymon Dogg, who plays violin, sings on and wrote the track "Lose This Skin"; he later joined Strummer's band the Mescaleros. Gallagher's children also made appearances: his two sons, Luke and Ben, singing a version of "Career Opportunities" from the band's first album, and his daughter Maria singing a snippet of "The Guns of Brixton", from London Calling, at the end of the track "Broadway".

This is also the only Clash album on which all four members have a lead vocal. Drummer Topper Headon made a unique lead vocal contribution on the song "Ivan Meets G.I. Joe", and Simonon sings lead on "The Crooked Beat".

The song "Up in Heaven (Not Only Here)" borrowed some lyrics from the Phil Ochs song "United Fruit" featured on the album Sings for Broadside (released 1976).

The title refers to the Sandinistas in Nicaragua, and its catalogue number, 'FSLN1', refers to the abbreviation of the party's Spanish name, Frente Sandinista de Liberación Nacional. The album title was chosen in response to a statement by British prime minister Margaret Thatcher advocating for a ban on public use of the Sandinistas' name.

== Release ==
According to Joe Strummer, the decision to release a triple-LP was their way of mocking CBS for resisting their desire to release London Calling as a double album, then releasing Bruce Springsteen's double album The River less than a year later. Strummer took pleasure in the abundance, saying "It was doubly outrageous. Actually, it was triply outrageous." Mick Jones said, "I always saw it as a record for people who were, like, on oil rigs. Or Arctic stations. People that weren't able to get to the record shops regularly."

The band's wish to release the album at a low price was also met with resistance, and they had to forgo any royalties on the first 200,000 copies sold in the UK and a 50% cut in royalties elsewhere.

Four singles were released from the Sandinista! sessions in the UK: "Bankrobber" (which did not appear on the album), "The Call Up", "Hitsville UK", and "The Magnificent Seven". A single disc promotional sampler called Sandinista Now! was sent to press and radio. The side one track listing was "Police on My Back", "Somebody Got Murdered", "The Call Up", "Washington Bullets", "Ivan Meets G.I. Joe" and "Hitsville U.K.". The side two track listing was "Up in Heaven (Not Only Here)", "The Magnificent Seven", "The Leader", "Junco Partner", "One More Time" and "The Sound of Sinners".

The song "Washington Bullets" was lyricist Joe Strummer's most extensive—and most specific—political statement to date. In it, Strummer name checks conflicts or controversies from around the world, namely in Chile, Nicaragua, Cuba, Afghanistan and Tibet. The Rolling Stone review of Sandinista! calls "Washington Bullets", along with "The Equaliser" and "The Call Up", "the heart of the album".

The original, 3-disc vinyl release of Sandinista! included a tri-fold lyric sheet titled The Armagideon Times, no. 3 (a play on "Armagideon Time", the B-side from the single London Calling.) Armagideon Times, nos. 1 and 2 were Clash fanzines. The lyric sheet featured cartoons credited to Steve Bell, as well as hand-written (but still legible) lyrics of all the original songs. The 2-CD release contains a facsimile of the lyric sheet considerably reduced in size.

The cover photo of the band was taken by Pennie Smith, in Camley Street, behind St Pancras railway station.

== Reception ==
Professional ratings
Review scores
Source	Rating
AllMusic	3.5/5 stars
Alternative Press	4/5
The Baltimore Sun	3/4 stars
Blender	5/5 stars
Q	4/5 stars
Rolling Stone	5/5 stars
The Rolling Stone Album Guide	4/5 stars
Select	3/5
Spin Alternative Record Guide	8/10
The Village Voice	A−

In the UK, initial reviews were mostly poor. In the NME Nick Kent wrote that "the record simply perplexes and ultimately depresses". Upset, the Clash approached editor Neil Spencer to have the record re-reviewed. The request was denied. "None of the other reviews in the music press, bar Robbi Millar's in Sounds, thought much of the record, either. The Face magazine mercilessly took the piss out of it."

In the US, the story was a bit different. John Piccarella, in a review for Rolling Stone headlined "The Clash Drop the Big One", argued that in effect, the band said "to hell with Clash style, there's a world out there." Some critics have argued that the album would have worked better as a less ambitious, smaller project, while Piccarella (in his Rolling Stone review) and others think of the album as a breakthrough that deserves comparison to the Beatles' "White Album". Robert Christgau wrote in The Village Voice, "If this is their worst—which it is, I think—they must be, er, the world's greatest rock and roll band".

The triple album was included in several "best of the year" critics' polls in 1981. It was voted first place in The Village Voice's 1981 Pazz & Jop critics' poll. According to CMJ, Sandinista! was the second most-played album of 1981 on American college radio. Dave Marsh noted that it was a record whose topic was as many years ahead of its time as its sound. Alternative Press included Sandinista! on its 2000 list of the "10 Essential Political-Revolution Albums". In 2018, Sandinista! was ranked at number 144 on Pitchfork's list of the 200 best albums of the 1980s. In 2020, the album was ranked at number 323 on Rolling Stone's list of the 500 greatest albums of all time.

The Sandinista! Project, a tribute to the album featuring the Smithereens, Camper Van Beethoven, Jon Langford and Sally Timms (Mekons), Amy Rigby, Katrina Leskanich (of Katrina and the Waves), Wreckless Eric, Willie Nile, Matthew Ryan, Stew, Mark Cutler, Sex Clark Five, Sid Griffin & Coal Porters, Haale, the Blizzard of 78 featuring Mikey Dread, Ruby on the Vine, and many others, was released on 15 May 2007, on the 00:02:59 Records (a label named after a lyric from the Sandinista! song "Hitsville U.K."). The album also features a collaboration by Soul Food and Mickey Gallagher on "Midnight Log".

Sandinista! is remembered as an important influence for the Chilean rock band Los Prisioneros. The band members discovered the album in the austral summer of 1981 through a special report in Radio Concierto. Jorge González recalls he found it "advanced" and "Martian" and that "it taught me to do music". In 1989, Joyce Millman of The San Francisco Examiner named Sandinista! as one of the ten best albums of the 1980s, describing it as "a world-music party that anticipated by years the eclecticism of albums like Paul Simon's Graceland and U2's Rattle and Hum." Millman believed the album "still adds up to a great open-hearted multicultural adventure."

Kurt Cobain of Nirvana referenced the album negatively as his first introduction to punk rock stating, "I went to borrow the Clash's Sandinista! from the library [...] 'if this is punk rock, I'm not sure I like it.'" Musicians who consider Sandinista! one of their favourite albums include ex-Galaxie 500 frontman Dean Wareham, Adam Franklin of Swervedriver, and Willy Vlautin of Richmond Fontaine, Frankin comments that the album works better on shuffle, as it is uncertain "where it's going to land". Tim Burgess of the Charlatans said: "before I was in a band, Sandinista! by The Clash let me know the possibilities of what could be done by going back to the drawing board as far as albums were concerned."

== Track listing ==
The compact disc release has the first three sides on the first CD and the latter three sides on the second CD.

All lead vocals by Joe Strummer, except where noted.

All tracks are written by the Clash, except where noted.

Side one
No.	Title	Writer(s)	Lead vocals	Length
1.	"The Magnificent Seven"	Mick Jones, Strummer, Topper Headon, Norman Watt-Roy, Mickey Gallagher		5:28
2.	"Hitsville UK"		Jones, Ellen Foley	4:20
3.	"Junco Partner"	Bob Shad aka Robert Ellen		4:53
4.	"Ivan Meets G.I. Joe"		Headon	3:05
5.	"The Leader"			1:41
6.	"Something About England"		Jones, Strummer	3:42
Total length:				23:09

Side two
No.	Title	Writer(s)	Lead vocals	Length
1.	"Rebel Waltz"			3:25
2.	"Look Here"	Mose Allison	The Clash, Mikey Dread	2:44
3.	"The Crooked Beat"		Paul Simonon	5:29
4.	"Somebody Got Murdered"		Jones	3:34
5.	"One More Time"	The Clash, Mikey Dread		3:32
6.	"One More Dub" (dub version of "One More Time")	The Clash, Dread		3:34
Total length:				22:18

Side three
No.	Title	Writer(s)	Lead vocals	Length
1.	"Lightning Strikes (Not Once but Twice)"			4:51
2.	"Up in Heaven (Not Only Here)"	The Clash, Phil Ochs	Jones	4:31
3.	"Corner Soul"			2:43
4.	"Let's Go Crazy"			4:25
5.	"If Music Could Talk"	The Clash, Dread		4:36
6.	"The Sound of Sinners"			4:00
Total length:				25:06

Side four
No.	Title	Writer(s)	Lead vocals	Length
1.	"Police on My Back"	Eddy Grant; originally performed by the Equals	Jones	3:15
2.	"Midnight Log"			2:11
3.	"The Equaliser"			5:47
4.	"The Call Up"			5:25
5.	"Washington Bullets"			3:51
6.	"Broadway" (features an epilogue of "The Guns of Brixton" sung by Maria Gallagher)			5:45
Total length:				26:14

Side five
No.	Title	Writer(s)	Lead vocals	Length
1.	"Lose This Skin"	Tymon Dogg	Tymon Dogg	5:07
2.	"Charlie Don't Surf"		Strummer, Jones	4:55
3.	"Mensforth Hill" ("Something About England" backwards with overdubs)		Instrumental	3:42
4.	"Junkie Slip"			2:48
5.	"Kingston Advice"		Strummer, Jones	2:36
6.	"The Street Parade"			3:26
Total length:				22:34

Side six
No.	Title	Writer(s)	Lead vocals	Length
1.	"Version City"		Jones and Strummer	4:23
2.	"Living in Fame" (dub version of "If Music Could Talk")	The Clash, Dread	Dread	4:36
3.	"Silicone on Sapphire" (dub version of "Washington Bullets")			4:32
4.	"Version Pardner" (dub version of "Junco Partner")			5:22
5.	"Career Opportunities" (Re-recorded version sung by as credited)		Luke Gallagher, Ben Gallagher	2:30
6.	"Shepherds Delight"	The Clash, Dread	Instrumental	3:25
Total length:				24:48 (144:09)

== Personnel ==
=== The Clash ===
- Joe Strummer – lead and backing vocals, guitar, keyboards
- Mick Jones – guitar, keyboards, lead and backing vocals
- Paul Simonon – bass guitar, backing vocals, lead vocals on "The Crooked Beat"
- Topper Headon – drums, lead vocals on "Ivan Meets G.I. Joe", backing vocals on "The Sound of Sinners"

=== Additional musicians ===
- Tymon Dogg (credited as 'Timon Dogg') – vocals and violin on "Lose This Skin", violin on "Lightning Strikes (Not Once but Twice)", "Something About England", "Mensforth Hill", "Junco Partner" and "The Equaliser", keyboard on "The Sound of Sinners"
- Mickey Gallagher (Blockheads) – keyboards
- Norman Watt-Roy (Blockheads) – bass guitar on "The Magnificent Seven", "Hitsville UK", "One More Time", "Look Here", "Something About England", "The Call Up", "Lose This Skin", "Charlie Don't Surf", and "Lightning Strikes (Not Once but Twice)"
- J.P. Nicholson – bass guitar
- Ellen Foley – co-lead vocal on "Hitsville U.K.", backing vocals on "Corner Soul" and "Washington Bullets"
- Davey Payne (Blockheads) – saxophone on "Ivan Meets G.I. Joe", "Something About England", "The Crooked Beat", "If Music Could Talk", "Lose This Skin" and "Mensforth Hill"
- Rick Gascoigne – trombone on "Ivan Meets G.I. Joe", "Something About England", "Lose This Skin", "Mensforth Hill" and "The Street Parade"
- Band Sgt. Dave Yates – drill sergeant on "The Call Up"
- Den Hegarty (Darts) – vocals on "The Sound of Sinners"
- Luke & Ben Gallagher – vocals on "Career Opportunities"
- Maria Gallagher – coda vocals on "Broadway" (singing "The Guns of Brixton")
- Gary Barnacle – saxophone on "Ivan Meets G.I. Joe", "Something About England", "The Crooked Beat", "Lose This Skin", "Mensforth Hill" and "The Street Parade"
- Arthur Edward "Bill" Barnacle (Gary's father) – trumpet on "Ivan Meets G.I. Joe", "Something About England", "Lose This Skin" and "The Street Parade"
- Jody Linscott – percussion
- Ivan Julian (Voidoids) – guitar on "The Call Up"
- Noel "Tempo" Bailey (aka Sowell, reggae artist/session man) – guitar
- Anthony Nelson Steelie (Wycliffe Johnson of Steely and Clevie) – keyboards
- Lew Lewis (Eddie and the Hot Rods) – harmonica on "Junco Partner", "Look Here", "Corner Soul", "Midnight Log", "The Equaliser", "Version City" and "Version Pardner"
- Gerald Baxter-Warman
- Terry McQuade (had a small role in Rude Boy)
- Rudolph Adolphus Jordan
- Battersea (Topper Headon's dog) – barking on "Somebody Got Murdered"
- Mikey Dread – vocals on "The Crooked Beat", "One More Time", "Living in Fame" and "Look Here"
- Style Scott – drums on "Junco Partner" and "Version Pardner"

A recording of Habte Selassie, host of the WBAI radio show Labbrish, can be heard at the beginning of "Lightning Strikes (Not Once But Twice)".

=== Production ===
- The Clash – producers
- Bill Price – chief engineer
- Jerry Green – engineer
- J. P. Nicholson – engineer
- Lancelot "Maxie" McKenzie – engineer
- Mark Freegard – assistant engineer
- Mikey Dread – version mix
- Pennie Smith – photography
- Steve Bell – cartoonist

== Charts ==
Chart performance for Sandinista!
Chart (1980–1981)	Peak position
Australian Albums (Kent Music Report)	36
Canada Top Albums/CDs (RPM)	3
Finnish Albums (The Official Finnish Charts)	18
Italian Albums (Musica e Dischi)	11
New Zealand Albums (RMNZ)	3
Norwegian Albums (VG-lista)	8
Swedish Albums (Sverigetopplistan)	9
UK Albums (Official Charts)	19
US Billboard 200	24

== Certifications ==
Certifications for Sandinista!
Region	Certification	Certified units/sales
France (SNEP)	Gold	100,000^{*}
United Kingdom (BPI) 1999 release	Silver	60,000^{^}
United States (RIAA)	Gold	500,000^{^}
^{*} Sales figures based on certification alone.^{^} Shipments figures based on certification alone.
