= Rudy's Can't Fail Cafe =

Northern Californian diner

Coordinates: 37.830960°N 122.285993°W

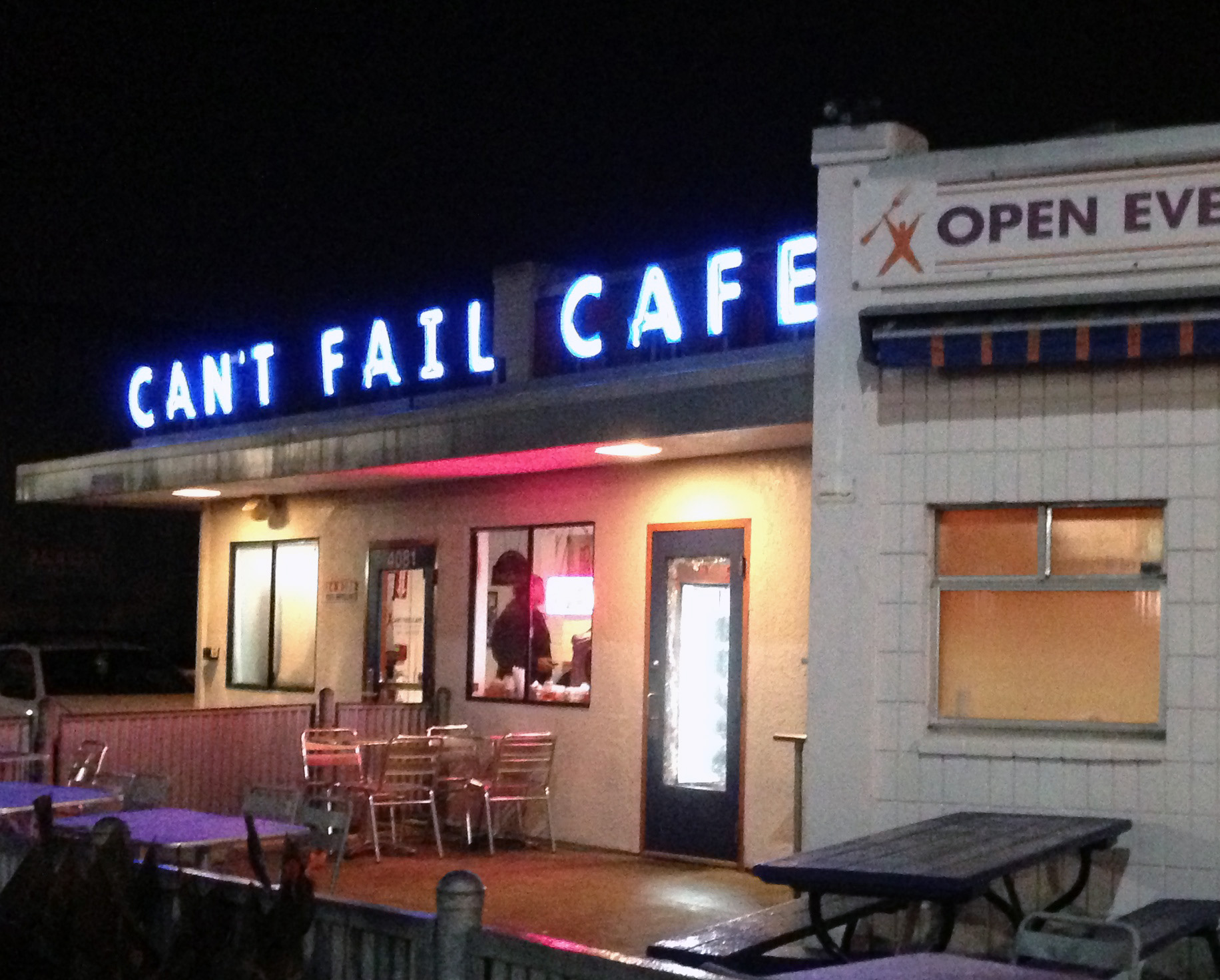
Rudy's Can't Fail Cafe, Emeryville

Rudy's Can't Fail Cafe is a diner in northern California named after the Clash song "Rudie Can't Fail". Rudy's is part-owned by Mike Dirnt from Green Day, and was featured on the Food Network show Diners, Drive-Ins and Dives.

== History ==
Rudy's Can't Fail Cafe opened in 2002 in Emeryville, and a second location in Uptown Oakland near the Fox Oakland Theatre followed in 2011. The location in Emeryville was originally Eugene's Ranch, which was open for 36 years under Eugene Lee and was still serving its $1.95 two-egg breakfast in 1990. Eugene's daughter Priscilla approached Jeffery Bischoff, a customer, to see if he would like to purchase the restaurant. Thirteen years later, Rudy's is an institution in Emeryville and a well known Bay Area diner.

In 2010, Rudy's original location was featured on an episode of Food Network's Diners, Drive-Ins, and Dives.

Rudy's closed their Oakland location on Thursday, July 26, 2018.

Rudy's BLAT sandwich (a BLT with avocado) was featured on Lonely Planet's A field guide to 20 great American sandwiches.

On August 8, 2022, Rudy's Can't Fail Cafe announced their permanent closure. In October 2022, they re-opened for business under mostly new ownership.

== Awards ==
- 2004 KPIX Channel 5 Evening Magazine - Best Diner in the East Bay
- 2004 East Bay Express Best of the East Bay - Best French Fries
- 2005 Best of Citysearch/ Oakland - Best Breakfast, Best Hamburger
- 2006 Best of Citysearch/Oakland - Best Breakfast, Best Hamburger
- 2007 Best of Citysearch/ Oakland - Best Family Friendly Dining
- 2008 East Bay Express Best of the East Bay - Best Waiter/Waitress Outfits
- 2008 East Bay Express Best of the East Bay - Winner - Best Diner
- 2009 Best of Citysearch/Oakland - Winner - Best Breakfast, Best Brunch
- 2009 SF Gate-SF Chronicle Winner - Best Diner in San Francisco Bay Area
- 2010 SF Gate-SF Chronicle Winner - Best Diner in San Francisco Bay Area
