= Fox Oakland Theatre =

Concert hall, in Oakland, California

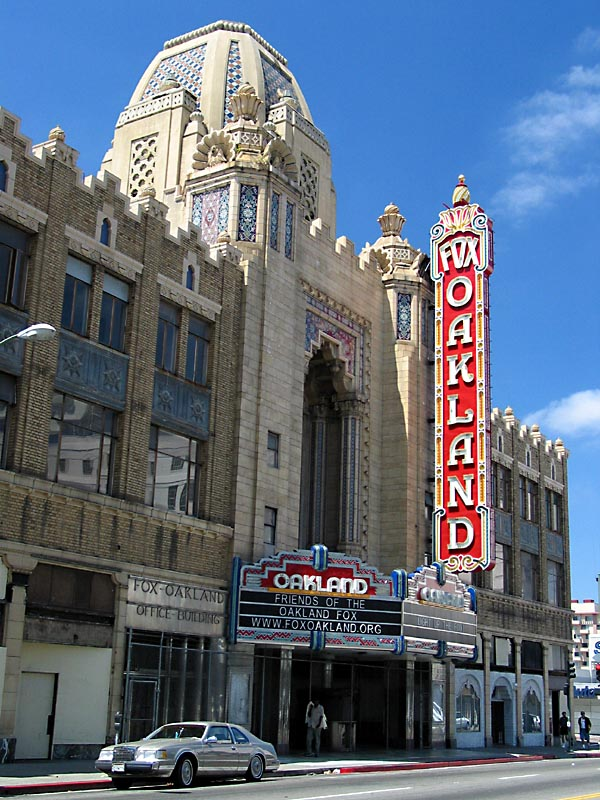
- Fox Oakland Theatre 2002
- Interactive map of Fox Oakland Theatre
- Location: 1807 Telegraph Avenue; Oakland, California, US
- Coordinates: 37°48′28″N 122°16′12″W
- Owner: City of Oakland
- Operator: Another Planet Entertainment
- Seating type: Orchestra, Balcony
- Capacity: 2,800
- Type: Indoor theatre
- Public transit: 19th Street Oakland; Uptown Transit Center

Construction
- Opened: 1928
- Renovated: February 5, 2009
- Closed: 1973

Website
- thefoxoakland.com
- Fox-Oakland Theatre
- U.S. National Register of Historic Places
- Oakland Designated Landmark
- Location within Oakland, California Location within California Location within the United States
- Location: 1807–29 Telegraph Ave., Oakland, California
- Coordinates: 37°48′32″N 122°16′9″W
- Built: 1928
- Built by: Maury L. Diggs
- Architect: Weeks and Day
- Architectural style: Art Deco architecture
- NRHP reference No.: 79000468
- ODL No.: 23

Significant dates
- Added to NRHP: February 2, 1979
- Designated ODL: 1978

The Fox Oakland Theatre is a 2,800-seat concert hall, a former movie theater, located at 1807 Telegraph Avenue in Downtown Oakland It originally opened in 1928, running films until 1970. Designed by Weeks and Day, the theatre is listed on the National Register of Historic Places. It was refurbished in the 2000s and reopened as a concert venue on February 5, 2009.

== History ==
Originally intended to be named "The Bagdad" because of its Middle Eastern influenced architecture, the theater instead displayed the name "The Oakland" on the marquee, with the word "Oakland" forming the main portion of the vertical blade sign above the marquee. It was also known as the "West Coast Oakland". The Oakland became the 251st theater to open in the West Coast Theater chain. Opening day was October 27, 1928, after two years of construction. The opening celebration was highly anticipated by the Bay Area residents, as the theater's 3,200 seats made it the largest in Oakland, more than the nearby Orpheum Theatre in San Francisco which held 2,561, and more than the new 1,075-seat Dufwin which had opened three weeks earlier. The first film shown at the Oakland was Fox's The Air Circus, an early sound film. Live performances took place on stage between films and newsreels, including "King of the Banjo" Eddie Peabody. House Music was provided by the Hermie King band with 20 members, and by an organist playing the house organ, a Wurlitzer Opus 1960 with 3 manuals and 15 ranks of pipes. A staff of 150 was required to run the theater.

In March 1929, the theater was renamed the "Fox Oakland" when William Fox bought the West Coast Theatres chain and merged it with his Fox Theatres chain. The launch of the Fox was expected to earn high earnings in the downtown district. Reestablishing the movie industry, the Fox offered the opportunity to stray from the silent films and helped introduce the "talkies" by having a live stage show.

== Years of Closure ==
Attendance significantly dropped in the 1960s and on September 14, 1965 the Fox closed, "temporarily," according to the San Francisco Chronicle, "The movie ... which will be shown on the Fox Oakland's last day is the Marlon Brando spy melodrama, Morituri". During the next seven years the theater opened sporadically for movies and special events, but never found a market that could support the required overhead and maintenance. In 1973 the theater building was twice the victim of arson after the owner refused to hire a quota of Black Panthers and pay for their "protection". In 1977 the theater was used during the filming of the horror film Nightmare in Blood directed by John Stanley. In 1983 and 1984 the Dickens Fair used the theater for Victorian England reenactments, setting up a mock village.

By 1975 the building was in such disrepair that the City's Public Works Department presented a plan for the City to purchase the property, demolish the building, and create a parking lot. However, their plans floundered and on Jan. 24, 1978 the Mann Theater Group sold the theater at auction to Mario and Erma DeLucchi for $340,000. A few months after the purchase, Mr. DeLucchi died of a heart attack and plans for a restoration of the theater never took off. With the support of then-Oakland Mayor Lionel Wilson the building was designated an Oakland City Landmark in 1978 and was listed on the National Register of Historic Places the following year.

== Restoration ==
In 1996, the Oakland Redevelopment Agency bought the building for $3 million. In 1999 a group of concerned citizens formed the Friends of The Oakland Fox and some badly needed restoration work began. In December 2004, the Oakland Redevelopment Agency received a $2.9 million grant for further restoration of the theater.

When mayor Jerry Brown needed to find a new home for the Oakland School for the Arts, a charter high school dedicated to the arts, the task fell to the Redevelopment Staff who conceived of the idea of placing the school in the retail and office space that surrounded, and were part of, the Fox Theatre building. Restoring and reopening the theater in a shared use plan with the school was quickly championed by local developer Phil Tagami. Friends of the Oakland Fox played a role with the Oakland Redevelopment Agency in raising funding for the elaborate $75 million restoration process.

== Reopening ==
February 2009 marked the beginning of a new era for the Fox. After being neglected for forty years, the once glamorous theater made its comeback as a 2,800-seat concert hall. Accentuating its revival, the theater's grand opening night featured a "roaring twenties" theme celebrating the newly renovated theater MC'ed by Oakland native, comedian Don Reed (East 14th, The Tonight Show with Jay Leno, Snap Judgment). The first paid performance after reopening was Social Distortion. The Oakland Fox Theatre now serves as a school, restaurant, and prominent live concert venue. It has hosted many concerts by artists such as The Avett Brothers, B.B. King, Paul Simon, Korn, Kylie Minogue, the Allman Brothers, Widespread Panic, Bob Dylan, Green Day, Twenty One Pilots, Charli XCX, Marina and the Diamonds, King Crimson, Metallica, Marilyn Manson, Primus, Alice in Chains, Atoms For Peace, Black Star, Lorde, Animal Collective, X Japan, the Decemberists, and Van Morrison since 2009. President Barack Obama spoke at the Fox during his 2012 Reelection Campaign.

== New Features ==
The Oakland Fox Theatre is the home of the Oakland School for the Arts, a charter school founded in 2002 which enrolls students from 6-12th grade specializing in the arts. In 2011 Rudy's Can't Fail Cafe opened their second location in the building: it is co-owned by Green Day's Mike Dirnt. Rudy's closed on Thursday, July 26, 2018.

== Architecture ==
With terra cotta, rich colors, intricate gold accents, and distinctive dome, the theater's design redefined architecture in the 1920s. The interior of the Fox Theatre was delicately crafted and said to be described as "mystical". With its intriguing resemblance of an Indian temple, the Fox Theatre was a fascinating attribute to downtown Oakland. At this time, theaters across the nation strived to be more than just a typical building. The designs of various theaters were inspired greatly by Middle Eastern and Indian architecture.

== See also ==
- Fox Theater (disambiguation) for Fox Theatres in other U.S. cities
- Grand Lake Theatre
- Paramount Theatre (Oakland, California)
