= Explosion (The Equals album) =

Studio album by the Equals
- Released: 3 December 1967
- Genre: Pop rock
- Producer: Edward Kassner

The Equals chronology
| Unequalled Equals (1967) | Explosion (1967) | Sensational Equals (1968) |

Singles from Explosion
- 1. "Police on My Back" Released: 6 October 1967 (Europe); 2. "Give Love a Try" b/w "Another Sad and Lonely Night" Released: 13 October 1967

Explosion, also known as Equals Explosion, is the second album by the Equals, released on 3 December 1967.

Two songs on the album were originally written by Bobby Fuller for his group the Bobby Fuller Four. The opening track, "Giddy Up a Ding Dong" was originally a 1950s number by Freddie Bell and the Bellboys. All of their original numbers were written by either Eddy Grant, Derv Gordon, or Lincoln Gordon.

== Reception ==
The album debuted at No. 32 in the UK for 1 week before dropping off by the next.

== Track listing ==
Side A

1. Giddy-Up-A-Ding-Dong (written by Freddie Bell and Pep Lattanzi)
2. Another Sad And Lonely Night (written by Bobby Fuller)
3. I've Got To Have A Little (written by Derv Gordon, Eddy Grant, and Lincoln Gordon)
4. Granny, Granny (written by Derv Gordon and Eddy Grant)
5. Police On My Back (written by Eddy Grant)
6. Give Love A Try (written by Eddy Grant)

Side B

1. You Got Too Many Boyfriends (written by Derv Gordon, Eddy Grant, and Lincoln Gordon)
2. Teardrops (written by Derv Gordon, Eddy Grant, and Lincoln Gordon)
3. Let Her Dance (written by Bobby Fuller)
4. Leaving You Is Hard To Do (written by Derv Gordon and Lincoln Gordon)
5. You'd Better Tell Her (written by Derv Gordon, Eddy Grant, and Lincoln Gordon)
6. She Reminds Me Of Spring In The Winter (written by Derv Gordon and Lincoln Gordon)

== Personnel ==
The Equals

- Derv Gordon – lead vocals
- Eddy Grant – lead guitar
- Pat Lloyd – rhythm guitar
- Lincoln Gordon – bass guitar, guitar
- John Hall – drums

Additional

- Alan Smith – sleeve notes
