= Police and Thieves (album) =

Studio album by Junior Murvin
- Released: April 1977
- Studios: Black Ark, Washington Gardens, Kingston, Jamaica
- Genre: Reggae
- Length: 37:59
- Label: Island
- Producer: Lee 'Scratch' Perry

Junior Murvin chronology
Police and Thieves (1977)	Tedious (1978)

Professional ratings
Review scores
Source	Rating
AllMusic	5/5 stars
Christgau's Record Guide	B
The Daily Telegraph	5/5 stars
The Independent	(very favorable)

Police and Thieves is an album by Junior Murvin and backing band the Upsetters, released in 1977. Along with the Heptones' Party Time and Max Romeo's War Ina Babylon, this album is considered part of a Black Ark Lee 'Scratch' Perry-produced "holy trinity".

== Track listing ==
All tracks composed by Junior Murvin and Lee "Scratch" Perry; except where indicated

=== Original LP ===
1. "Roots Train"
2. "Police and Thieves"
3. "Solomon" (Murvin)
4. "Rescue Jah Children"
5. "Tedious"
6. "False Teachin" (Perry)
7. "Easy Task" (Murvin)
8. "Lucifer"
9. "Workin' in the Cornfield" (Perry)
10. "I Was Appointed" (Murvin)

=== 2003 CD re-release ===
1. "Roots Train"
2. "Police and Thieves"
3. "Solomon"
4. "Rescue Jah Children"
5. "Tedious"
6. "False Teachin"
7. "Easy Task"
8. "Lucifer"
9. "Working in the Cornfield"
10. "I Was Appointed"
11. "Childhood Sweetheart" (Murvin)
12. "Bad Weed" (Discomix)
13. "Roots Train" (Discomix)
14. "Memories" (B-side of "Police and Thieves")
15. "Rasta Get Ready" (Curtis Mayfield's "People Get Ready")

== Personnel ==
- Junior Murvin – vocals
- Cedric Myton, George Faith – vocals
- Robert "Billy" Johnson – guitar
- Boris Gardiner – bass
- Winston Wright, Errol "Tarzan" Nelson – keyboards
- "Dirty" Harry Hall, Herman Marquis, "Deadly" Headley Bennett – horns
- Dillinger – additional vocals on "Roots Train" discomix
- Tony Wright – cover illustration
