= Dr Alimantado =

Jamaican reggae singer, DJ, and producer (born 1952)

- Also known as: The Ital Surgeon
- Born: Winston James Thompson; 1952 (age 73–74); Kingston, Jamaica
- Genres: Reggae, Dancehall
- Instruments: Vocalist, producer

Dr Alimantado (born Winston James Thompson; 1952), also known as The Ital Surgeon, is a Jamaican reggae singer, deejay, and producer.

== Life and career ==
Thompson adopted the Rastafarian faith at an early age. He honed his talents on local sound systems such as Coxsone Dodd's 'Downbeat' and 'Lord Tippertone', and started to record very young under various names (Winston Price, Winston Cool, Ital Winston, or Youth Winston). His first recordings were for Lee "Scratch" Perry and Bunny Lee - "Place Called Africa Version 3" and "Maccabees Version". He returned to Lee "Scratch" Perry in 1976, recording the DJ portion of Devon Irons' 12" "Ketch Vampire". Between 1971 and 1977 his singles were unreleased outside Jamaica, only being available in the UK on import. He built his reputation with tunes such as "Oil Crisis" (versioning Horace Andy's "Ain't No Sunshine", originally by Bill Withers), "Sons of Thunder", (toasting over Jackie Brown's "Wiser Dread"), "Gimme Mi Gun" on Gregory Isaacs' "Thief a Man" and "Poison Flour", on a recut of The Paragons "Man Next Door" rhythm. He achieved more stable success and renown in the mid to late 1970s, with his best-known album being Best Dressed Chicken in Town (1978), a Greensleeves Records collection of tracks recorded in the mid-1970s, featuring Alimantado toasting over singers such as John Holt, Gregory Isaacs, Jackie Edwards and Horace Andy. His tunes mixed his Rastafari movement beliefs with commentary on events then going on in his community; "Poison Flour" referenced a January 1976 incident when 79 people in Jamaica were acutely poisoned by consuming flour, contaminated by leakage of the insecticide parathion in a ship's hold. Some reports at the time attributed the contamination to the two products being in the same delivery truck. In total, 17 victims died.

In 1978, he appeared as himself in the film Rockers, directed by Ted Bafaloukos.

Alimantado became popular with punk rockers in the 1970s following Johnny Rotten praising him in an interview. He was mentioned in the 1979 song "Rudie Can't Fail" by The Clash in the line "Like the doctor who was born for a purpose".

He recorded "Born for a Purpose" in 1977 at Channel One Studios, one of Alimantado's biggest hits (along with "A Place Called Africa"). "Born for a Purpose" was originally released on his Vital Food label, and told of his Rastafarian faith supporting him after a bus hit him in Kingston on 26 December 1976, causing serious injuries. Bim Sherman provided backing vocals on the track. The musicians who played on the record did so without payment. The single, and its accompanying version "Still Alive" were released in the UK firstly as two 7" 45s, then as a 12", featuring the full extended mixes. By 1977, he had largely abandoned his toasting style, apart from occasional records such as "Go Deh Natty Go Deh" on a heavily dubbed mix of Delroy Wilson's "Trying to Conquer Me", preferring to release singing tunes, including "Mama (I Thank You)", "Jah Love Forever", and a cover of Billy Stewart's "Sitting in the Park".

Following the success of Best Dressed Chicken and its follow-up compilation Sons of Thunder he signed to Virgin Records as a singer. While not without vocal talent, his singing records never captured the public imagination to the extent that his "toasting" records did.

His last recording appears to be "Stop Your Fighting" for the Mad Professor's Ariwa label, on a Channel One Studios remake of Horace Andy's "Fever" rhythm.

The film Hancock used the song "Best Dressed Chicken in Town".

2009 marked the 30th anniversary of the issue of Best Dressed Chicken in Town. To mark the occasion, Alimantado re-released the album in its original sleeves with a bonus DVD on his own Keyman Records label.
