= I'm So Bored with the USA =

"I'm So Bored with the U.S.A."

Song by the Clash

from the album The Clash
- Released: 8 April 1977 (UK); July 1979 (US)
- Recorded: March 1977
- Genre: Punk rock
- Length: 2:25
- Label: CBS
- Songwriters: Joe Strummer; Mick Jones
- Producer: Mikey Foote

"I'm So Bored with the U.S.A." is a song by the English rock band the Clash, featured on their critically acclaimed 1977 eponymous debut studio album, which was released in the United States in July 1979 as their second studio album after Give 'Em Enough Rope. It was the album's third track in the original version and second in the US version.

== Song information ==
The song was originally titled "I'm So Bored with You", a song written by Mick Jones. According to Keith Topping's book The Complete Clash, the song was about Jones's girlfriend at the time, the same woman who was the topic of "Deny".

According to the story often told by the song's authors, Joe Strummer and Jones, including on the documentary Westway to the World, the change came about by Strummer mishearing the song's title when Jones played it to him during their first meeting at their Davies Road squat. The band's early recordings, including the popular live bootleg 5 Go Mad at The Roundhouse, include the song in its original form. However, by the time of the concert on 20 September 1976 at the Roundhouse, Camden, the song was performed using its new title. The intro to the song is a variant on the intro to "Pretty Vacant" by the Sex Pistols.

=== Themes ===
Originally demoed with slightly different lyrics during the Clash's second demo session with their soundman Mickey Foote as producer, "I'm So Bored with the U.S.A."'s lyrics do exactly what its title suggests, condemning several aspects of the American society, such as drug problems in the US Army (particularly heroin), support of American government backed dictatorships in the Third World (a theme later repeated on the Sandinista! track "Washington Bullets"), and popular series Starsky and Hutch and Kojak. It also criticises Richard Nixon, mentioning the Watergate scandal's tapes.

== Personnel ==
- Joe Strummer – rhythm guitar, lead vocal
- Mick Jones – lead guitars, backing vocal
- Paul Simonon – bass guitar
- Terry Chimes – drums

== Covers ==
- Canadian band Arcade Fire have played the song as part of their setlist on the "Reflektors" tour.
- Canadian punk band the Subhumans sang the song using the lyrics "I'm so bored with DOA" when opening for their fellow Vancouver punkers DOA at the Commodore ballroom in 1982.
- Ex-Stone Roses guitarist John Squire performed the song live. A recording was released on Time Changes Everything 8 Track Live.
