= Compendium Books =

Independent bookstore in London, England

Coordinates: 51°32′28″N 0°8′40″W

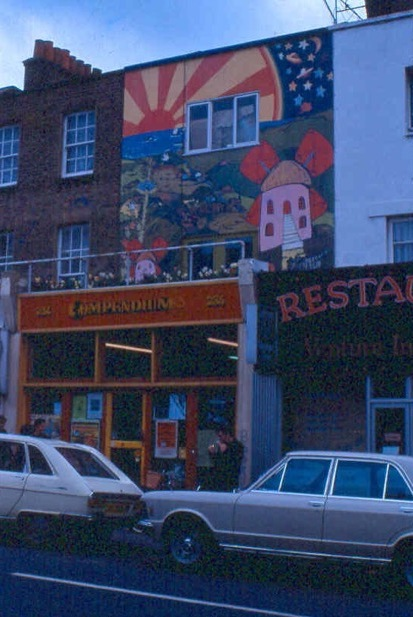
- The shop's front in 1978
- Company type: Book shop
- Founded: 1968 in London, England
- Founders: Diana Gravill and Nicholas Rochford
- Defunct: 2000

Compendium Books was an independent bookstore in London specialising in experimental literary and theoretical publications, from 1968 until its closure in 2000. The Guardian's John Williams described it as "Britain's pre-eminent radical bookstore. Whether you wanted books on anarchism, drugs, poststructuralism, feminism or Buddhism, Compendium was the place to go."

== History ==
The shop was founded by Diana Gravill and Nicholas Rochford and was originally located at 240 Camden High Street, with an offshoot added across the road at 281 Camden High Street in the early 70s. 281 housed the burgeoning humanistic psychology & esoteric books department, what later became known as 'mind, body. spirit'. After financial problems, the shop was eventually consolidated into 234 Camden High Street, London. The premises at 240 Camden High Street opened in August 1968. The establishment of Compendium Books was initially encouraged by feminist psychoanalyst Juliet Mitchell, whom Diana Gravill had met as part of her involvement with the Antiuniversity of London in 1968.

Following the closures of Better Books and Indica Bookshop, Compendium was for many years the main place for "the London literary avant-garde". It was a key venue for the British Poetry Revival and for availability of the texts of post-1968 political and cultural theory. There was a large music section, with many imported US titles on blues, soul, jazz and rock and roll. Compendium also had sections for left-wing politics, philosophy, feminist books & the aforementioned 'mind, body, spirit' department, invariably referred to as 'the back desk'. This was run from 1971 by Anne Shepherd, the company secretary, who was also a director of the limited company Cherrybay Ltd trading as Compendium Books, inaugurated in the late 1970s. The back desk was the most financially successful part of the shop & subsidised much of the rest of the departments.

The staff at Compendium included Nick Kimberley, now the opera critic for the London Evening Standard, and the critic and writer Elizabeth Young, whose The Guardian obituary described the shop in the late 1970s: "In the 1970s, she worked in London's finest alternative bookstore, the late-lamented Compendium Books, in Camden Town. More than simply a bookshop, Compendium was also a cultural centre for the punk-rock scene... The Clash, in particular, were regular visitors, writing The Prisoner about the shop's patriarch Nick Rochford."

In the 1980s, the fiction and poetry department was run by Mike Hart, whose The Guardian obituary recalls, "To walk into Compendium, survey the novels on display and ask Mike's advice was to enter a new world of fiction. The shop became the haunt of an unlikely mixture of more or less literary luminaries, from Nick Cave to Ben Okri, Ivor Cutler to Kathy Acker. Thanks to Mike, and others, Camden Town in the 1980s became a kind of counter-cultural nexus: a place where you could drift from record shop to caff to Compendium and thence to the pub. There you would find Mike at the heart of a group of autodidacts, musicians, writers, lowlifes and drunks whose house band was the Pogues and whose cultural heroes were Jim Thompson, Hank Williams, Tom Raworth and Little Willie John....As the 1980s moved into the 1990s, Camden became a magnet for the world's teenagers and Compendium underwent a facelift. Mike formalised its literary scene by initiating regular readings in the bookshop, something of an innovation at the time. Visiting Americans, from old beat heroes like Lawrence Ferlinghetti to new literary lions like Walter Mosley, read there; so too did the London writers Iain Sinclair, Martin Millar and Derek Raymond."

Another key member of the Compendium team was Chris Render, who ran the music section of the shop until it closed. He was often to manning the front desk and, in the back basement, unpacking stock. In Render's The Guardian obituary, his friend Philip Derbyshire recalls the William Burroughs book signing that Chris masterminded. Also a key person in the early years of Compendium was Don Skirving, who went on to run the very successful Airlift Books with his partner Beth. Airlift continued to distribute the type of books that Compendium sold after the demise of Compendium.

By the end of the 1990s, Camden Town was thoroughly commercialised, "its last remaining outposts of bohemianism swamped by endless leather jacket stores." Compendium Books closed in October 2000. Dave Davies from The Kinks cited Compendium as one of his favourite London spots.
