= Complete Control =

Single by the Clash

from the album The Clash (US version)
- B-side: "City of the Dead"
- Released: 23 September 1977
- Recorded: July 1977
- Studio: A: Sarm East Studios; B: CBS Studios, London
- Genre: Punk rock
- Length: 3:10
- Label: CBS
- Songwriters: Joe Strummer; Mick Jones
- Producer: Lee "Scratch" Perry

The Clash singles chronology
"Remote Control" (1977)	"Complete Control" (1977)	"Clash City Rockers" (1978)

The Clash reissued singles chronology
"Train in Vain" (1991)	"Complete Control" (1999)

Music video
- "Complete Control" on YouTube

"Complete Control" is a song by the English rock band the Clash, released as a 7" single and featured on the US release of their eponymous debut studio album.

== Background ==
The song is a polemic on record companies, managers and the state of punk music itself, the motivation for the song being the band's label (CBS Records) releasing "Remote Control" without asking them, which infuriated the group. Stereogum described it as "this extraordinary airing of grievances, a desperately catchy cataloguing of the many ills visited upon a young band experiencing its first forays into corporate culture".

The song also refers to managers of the time who sought to control their groups – Bernie Rhodes (of the Clash) and Malcolm McLaren (the Sex Pistols) – the song's title is derived from this theme. Bernie Rhodes had arranged a band meeting at the Ship, a pub in Soho's Wardour Street, where he said he wanted "complete control".

He said he wanted complete control. I came out of the pub with Paul collapsing on the pavement in hysterics over those words.

— Joe Strummer

The track also refers to the band's run-ins with the police, their practice of letting fans into gigs through the back door or window for free and a punk idealism seemingly crushed by the corporate reality they had become part of and the betrayal and anger they felt.

This message was scorned by some critics as naïveté on the part of the band – the DJ John Peel was one of those, suggesting that the group must have realised CBS were not "a foundation for the arts" – while others were strong in their support of the single.

Instead of a piece of cynicism, Complete Control becomes a hymn to Punk autonomy at its moment of eclipse.

— Jon Savage, England's Dreaming

The track was recorded at Sarm East Studios in Whitechapel, engineered by Mickey Foote and produced by Lee "Scratch" Perry. Perry had heard the band's cover of his Junior Murvin hit "Police and Thieves" and was moved enough to have put a picture of the band (the only white artist accorded such an honor) on the walls of his Black Ark Studios in Jamaica. When the Clash learned that Perry was in London producing for Bob Marley & the Wailers, he was invited to produce the single. "Scratch" readily agreed.

During the tracking session, some Clash and Perry biographies claim, Perry blew out a studio mixing board attempting to get a deep bass sound out of Paul Simonon's instrument, while a 1979 New Musical Express and Hit Parader article penned by Strummer and Jones stated that Perry had complimented Jones' guitar playing, saying he "played with an iron fist". Perry's contribution to the track, however, was toned down – the band went back and fiddled with the song themselves to bring the guitars out and played down the echo Perry had dropped on it. The song was also Topper Headon's first recording with the band, following the departure of Terry Chimes.

"Complete Control" reached number 28 on the singles chart, making it the Clash's first Top 30 release. It immediately became one of the Clash’s most popular songs. Listeners to the John Peel show voted "Complete Control" number 2 in 1978’s Festive Fifty.

In 1999, CBS Records reissued the single with a live version of "Complete Control". In 2004, Rolling Stone rated the song as No. 361 on its list of the 500 Greatest Songs of All Time. The song is featured as a playable track in the video games Guitar Hero: Aerosmith and as DLC in Rock Band. The Guardian described it as "the high watermark of the Clash’s punk period".

In 1980, guitarist Chuck Berry was asked to review some modern records by the St. Louis Jet Lag fanzine. After reviewing the Sex Pistols' "God Save the Queen", the next song to be reviewed was "Complete Control", his review read: "Sounds like the first one. The rhythm and chording work well together. Did this guy have a sore throat when he sang the vocals?"

== Track listing ==
All tracks written by Joe Strummer/Mick Jones.

7" vinyl

1. "Complete Control" – 3:15
2. "City of the Dead" – 2:22

== Personnel ==
=== "Complete Control" ===
- Joe Strummer – lead vocals, rhythm guitar
- Mick Jones – lead and rhythm guitars, backing vocals
- Paul Simonon – bass guitar
- Topper Headon – drums

=== "City of the Dead" ===
- Joe Strummer – lead vocal, backing vocal, organ, rhythm guitar
- Mick Jones – backing vocal, lead guitar
- Paul Simonon – bass guitar
- Topper Headon – drums
- Gary Barnacle – saxophones

== Charts ==
Chart performance for "Complete Control"
Chart (1977)	Peak position
UK Singles (Official Charts)	28
