= Hitsville UK =

"Hitsville U.K."
- Sleeve for the UK and Dutch single releases

Single by the Clash

from the album Sandinista!
- B-side: "Radio One"
- Released: 16 January 1981
- Recorded: 1980
- Genre: Post-punk; pop punk
- Length: 4:21
- Label: CBS
- Songwriter: The Clash
- Producer: The Clash

The Clash singles chronology
"The Call Up" (1980)	"Hitsville U.K." (1981)	"The Magnificent Seven" (1981)

"Hitsville U.K." is a song by the English punk rock band the Clash from their 1980 album Sandinista!. A duet between lead guitarist Mick Jones and his then-girlfriend Ellen Foley, it is the second single released from the album.

== Composition ==
The song's title is a nod to Motown Records, which used the moniker "Hitsville U.S.A." in its advertising and to refer to the label's first headquarters in Detroit.

The lyrics refer to the emerging indie scene in British music in the late 1970s and early 1980s, which is held in contrast to the "mutants, creeps and musclemen" of the major labels with their "expense accounts" and "lunch discounts", making "AOR" and using "chart-hyping" to sell their records. References are made to a number of UK independent labels (Lightning, Small Wonder, Rough Trade, Fast Product and Factory).

== Release ==
The original UK single release included "Radio One" by Mikey Dread as the B-side. A second issue, released later in 1981 in the US, replaced "Radio One" with "Police on My Back" as the B-side.

Like all other Clash singles, the song is available on the 1991 compilation The Singles and the 2013 remastered compilation The Clash Hits Back.

== Track listing ==
7" vinyl

1. "Hitsville UK" (The Clash) – 4:23
2. "Radio One" (Mikey Dread) – 6:20

7" vinyl (North America)

1. "Hitsville UK" (The Clash) – 4:23
2. "Police On My Back" (Eddy Grant) – 3:16

== Personnel ==
- Ellen Foley – lead vocals
- Mick Jones – lead vocals, piano, organ
- Joe Strummer – guitar
- Norman Watt-Roy – bass guitar
- Topper Headon – drums
- Jody Linscott – percussion, marimba

== Charts ==
Chart	Peak position	Date
UK Singles Chart	56	January 1981
U.S. Mainstream Rock	53	April 1981
