= Remote Control (The Clash song) =

Single by the Clash

from the album The Clash
- B-side: "London's Burning" (live)
- Released: 13 May 1977 (UK)
- Recorded: 1977
- Genre: Punk rock
- Length: 3:00
- Label: CBS
- Songwriters: Joe Strummer; Mick Jones
- Producers: Mickey Foote; The Clash; Bill Price

The Clash singles chronology
"White Riot" (1977)	"Remote Control" (1977)	"Complete Control" (1977)

Audio video
- "Remote Control" on YouTube

"Remote Control" is a song by the English rock band the Clash, featured on their eponymous debut studio album, and is written against oppression and conformity.

== Background ==
The song was written by Mick Jones after the disastrous Anarchy Tour and contains pointed observations about the civic hall bureaucrats who had cancelled concerts, the police, big business and especially record companies. The song mentions a "meeting in Mayfair" which is thought to refer to the EMI shareholders' meeting held on 7 December 1976, which effectively withdrew all support for the Anarchy Tour. Also alluded to in the song are the 'old-boy' peerage networks and hapless politicians.

Writing for the A.V. Club, Jason Heller said that the song "imagines a deliberately, dramatically exaggerated England circa 1977, one where urban claustrophobia, totalitarian authority, and a robotic kind of daily routine".

== Single release ==
The band virtually disowned the song, following their record label CBS's decision to release the song as a single without consulting the band. The band had already told Melody Maker magazine that their next single would be "Janie Jones", and were irate that CBS had undermined them and made a decision to release "Remote Control" instead without the band's permission. To the band, the song became a symbol of everything they were fighting against. The incident was referred to in the first lines of a later song, "Complete Control", which is on the 1979 US release of the album:

They said, 'Release "Remote Control", but we didn't want it on the label ...

The B-side is a mono live version of "London's Burning".

The band re-recorded the song in 1979 during rehearsals for London Calling, at Vanilla Studios in Vauxhall. This version was eventually released in 2004, on the second disc of the London Calling: 25th Anniversary Legacy Edition, known as The Vanilla Tapes. In the liner notes, Mick Jones is quoted as saying:

I think Joe [Strummer] disliked it on a symbolic level, because of what happened with the release. But we always liked the tune.

== Track listing ==
All tracks written by Joe Strummer/Mick Jones.

7" vinyl (UK)

1. "Remote Control" – 3:02
2. "London's Burning (Live at Dunstable)" – 2:12

7" vinyl (Netherlands)

1. "Remote Control" – 3:02
2. "London's Burning" – 2:10

== Personnel ==
- Joe Strummer – lead vocals, rhythm guitar
- Mick Jones – lead vocals, lead guitar and rhythm guitar
- Paul Simonon – bass guitar
- Terry Chimes – drums
- Topper Headon – drums on "London's Burning"
