= The Equals =

English rock band

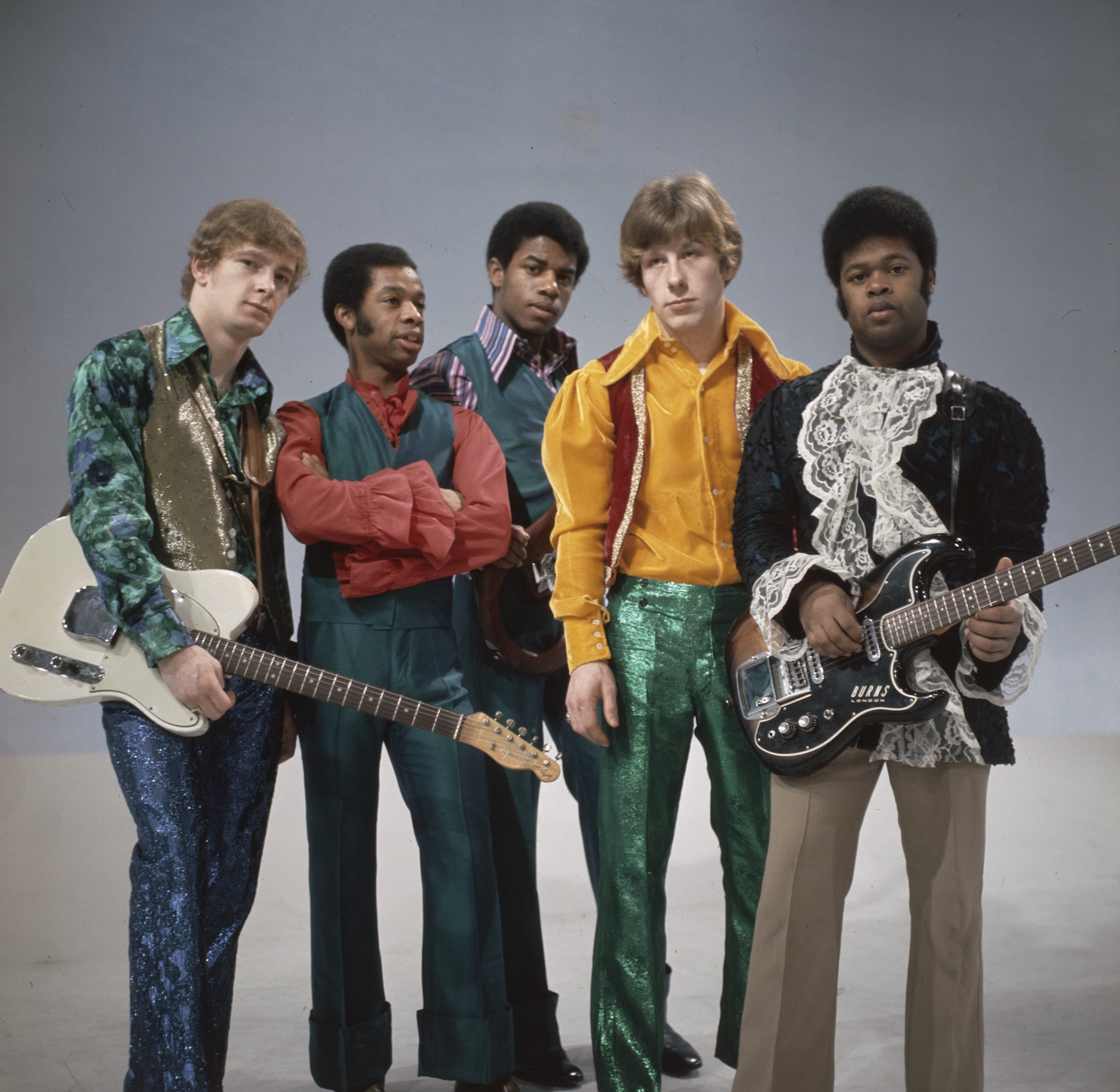
- The Equals in 1968. From left: Pat Lloyd, Derv Gordon, Eddy Grant, John Hall, Lincoln Gordon

Background information
- Origin: North London, England
- Genres: Rock; soul; pop; beat
- Years active: 1964–1979; 1982–present
- Label: President/RCA
- Members: Pat Lloyd; Ronnie Telemaque; Decosta Boyce; Keeling Lee
- Past members: Eddy Grant; Derv Gordon; Lincoln Gordon; John Hall; Jimmy Haynes; Rob Hendry; Dave Lennox; Frankie Hepburn; Dzal Martin; Mark Haley
- Website: theequals.co.uk

The Equals are an English rock band. They are best remembered for their million-selling chart-topper "Baby, Come Back", though they had several other chart hits in the UK and Europe. Drummer John Hall founded the group with Eddy Grant, Pat Lloyd, and brothers Derv and Lincoln Gordon, and they were noted as being "the first major interracial rock group in the UK" and "one of the few racially mixed bands of the era".

== History ==
=== Early career ===
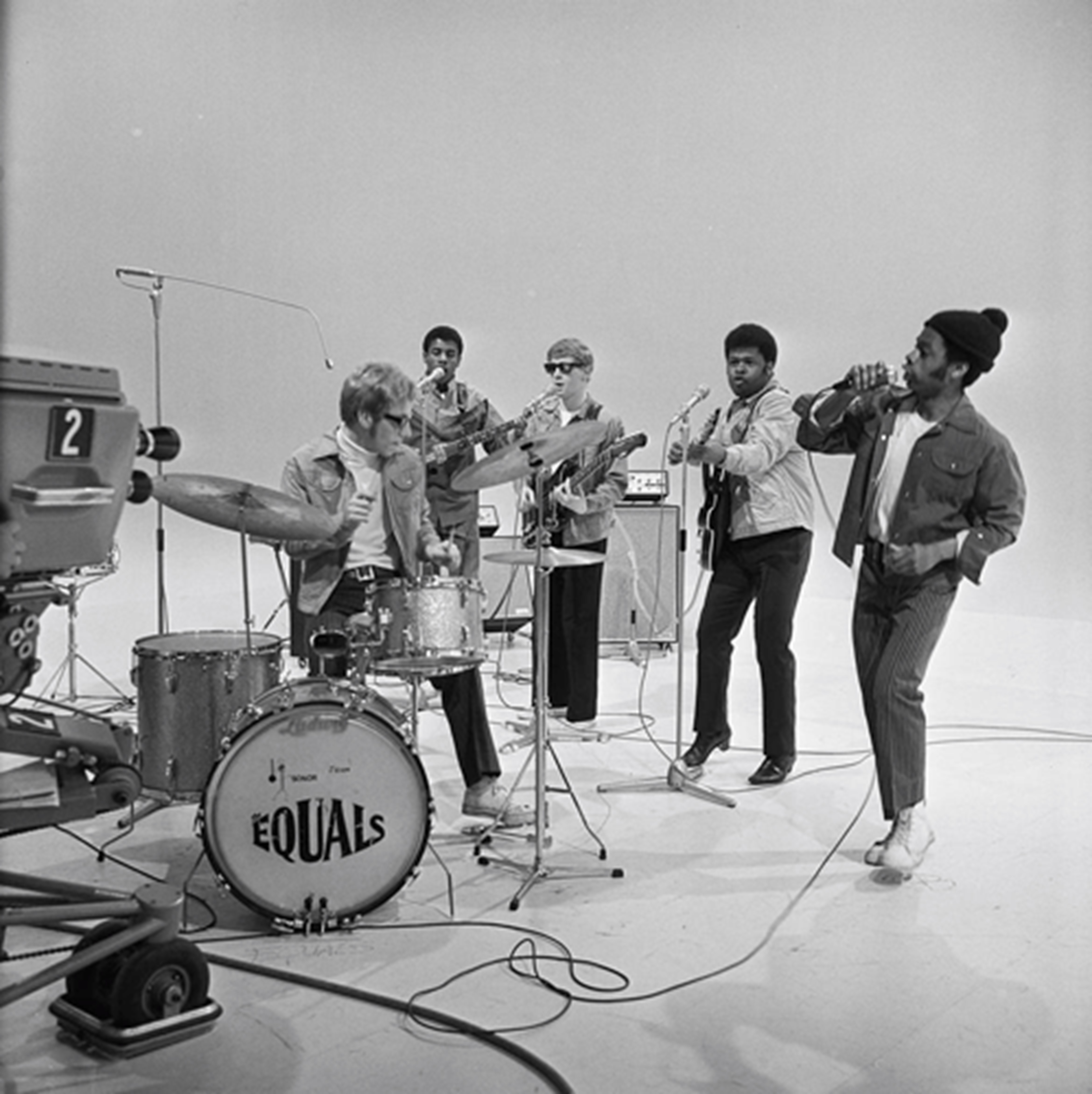
The Equals performing on the Dutch TV programme Fenklup on 27 May 1967

The group's members met on a Hornsey Rise council estate, where Grant, Lloyd, and Hall were school friends at Acland Burghley. In late 1964, Hall suggested that they form a band. John Hall (drums), Eddy Grant (lead guitar), Pat Lloyd (rhythm guitar), Derv Gordon (vocals), and Lincoln Gordon (rhythm guitar) became the Equals. The three-guitar lineup continued until 1969, when Lincoln Gordon switched from rhythm guitar to bass.

At first the Equals performed in London and gained a following "with their apparently limitless energy and a distinct style fusing pop, blues, and R&B plus elements of ska and bluebeat." They often opened the bill at shows by visiting American R&B and soul artists such as Bo Diddley, Solomon Burke, and Wilson Pickett. A neighbour of Grant's, singer Gene Latter, put them in touch with President Records, whose boss Edward Kassner heard them and agreed to sign them.

=== Commercial success, 1966–70 ===
The Equals released their first single "I Won’t Be There" in 1966, followed by "Hold Me Closer", with "Baby, Come Back" as the B-side. It did not do well in the United Kingdom, but after DJs in Europe began playing "Baby, Come Back", it went to the number one position in Germany and the Netherlands.

1968 saw the release of "I Get So Excited", which reached the Top 50 of the UK Singles Chart. The subsequent re-issue of "Baby, Come Back" in early 1968 reached the top position in the UK, giving President Records its only number one hit. The song reached one million sales in June 1969, and was certified gold. Several of their later singles charted in the UK, including two further top 10 hits, "Viva Bobby Joe" (1969) and "Black Skin Blue Eyed Boys" (1970).

Their main songwriter was Eddy Grant, with contributions from the Gordon brothers, Pat Lloyd and John Hall. Though the majority were on traditional teenage pop themes, some, such as "Stand Up and Be Counted", "Police on My Back", and the funky "Black Skin Blue Eyed Boys", touched on social and political issues.

The band also released several studio albums on President in quick succession, six in four years, including Unequalled Equals (1967) and Explosion (1968), both of which reached the UK Albums Chart. Several of their albums were repackaged by RCA, President's distributors, for the American market. According to the band, Kassner did not allow the band to tour the U.S. because of problems that might have arisen because of their multiracial line-up, though the band did tour other parts of the world, including Africa.

They made regular TV appearances on programmes including Top of the Pops in Britain and Beat-Club in Germany. The band also gained attention for their colourful clothes, presaging the glam rock style, and for Grant's occasional dyeing of his hair blonde, and wearing a woman's blonde wig. Writer Jason Heller commented: “The Equals were effectively code-switching between two audiences—immigrant rude boys and white pop fans—in the same song, if not the same line."

=== Break-up ===
In September 1969, all five group members were injured in a motorway car accident in Germany. Grant was the most severely injured and as a result left the touring version of the Equals while initially continuing to write songs for them. In January 1971, Grant suffered a collapsed lung and heart infection, following which he returned to Guyana. He soon started to pursue a solo career. John Hall left the band in 1974. The Equals disbanded in 1979.

=== Reformation and subsequent activities ===
In 1982 Pat Lloyd reformed The Equals with a modified lineup: Derv Gordon (vocals), Rob Hendry (lead guitar), Ronnie Telemacque (drums), Lincoln Gordon (rhythm guitar) and Pat Lloyd (bass) swapping instruments from the original lineup. In 1984 Lincoln Gordon left the band, and was replaced by David "Dzal" Martin, another guitarist who had filled in between 1973 and 1975 during Grant's absence.

In 2017, Derv Gordon left the Equals. Decosta Boyce, formerly of Heatwave, joined the group on lead vocals, and Mark Haley, previously with the Kinks, was added on keyboards. In March 2019, Keeling Lee, previously with Groove Armada, replaced Martin.

The Equals produced a new album in May 2022, and re-released the single "Nobody's Got Time", originally written by Eddy Grant. "Nobody's Got Time" reached No.15 in the Heritage Charts.

== Original line-up ==
- Eddy Grant (born 5 March 1948, Plaisance, Guyana) – lead guitar
- John Hall (born 25 October 1946, Islington, London) – drums
- Dervan "Derv" Gordon (born 29 January 1946, Jamaica) – vocals
- Patrick "Pat" Lloyd (born 17 March 1949, Holloway, London) – rhythm guitar
- Lincoln Gordon (born 29 June 1948, Jamaica) – bass, guitar

== Discography ==
=== Albums ===
Year	Album	UK
1967	Unequalled Equals	10
1968	Explosion	32
1968	Sensational Equals	—
1968	Equals Supreme	—
1969	Equals Strike Again	—
1970	Equals at the Top	—
1973	Rock Around the Clock Vol. 1	—
1976	Born Ya!	—
1977	Mystic Syster	—
1996	Roots	—
"—" denotes releases that did not chart.

==== Compilation albums ====
- Baby, Come Back (US compilation, 1968)
- Doin' the 45's (1975)
- First Among Equals – The Greatest Hits (1996)
- Black Skin Blue Eyed Boys – The Anthology (1999)

=== Singles ===
Year	Titles (A-side, B-side)	Peak chart positions							UK Album	US Album
Year	Titles (A-side, B-side)	UK	US	AUS	NOR	IRL	GER	SA	UK Album	US Album
1966	"I Won't Be There" b/w "Fire"	—	—	—	—	—	39	—	Unequalled	Unequalled
1967	"Give Love a Try" b/w "Another Sad and Lonely Night"	52 (Note: Chart position is from the official UK "Breakers List".)	—	—	—	—	—	—	Explosion	Non-album tracks
1967	"My Life Ain't Easy" b/w "You Got Too Many Boyfriends"	—	—	—	—	—	—	—	A: Unequalled; B: Explosion	A: Unequalled; B: Non-album track
1968	"I Get So Excited"; UK B: "The Skies Above"; US B: "Giddy Up a Ding Dong"	44	—	—	—	—	28	—	A & UK B: Sensational; US B: Explosion	A & US B: Unequalled; UK B: Baby, Come Back
1968	"Baby, Come Back" b/w "Hold Me Closer"	1	32	10	4	2	11	—	Unequalled	Baby, Come Back
1968	"Laurel and Hardy" b/w "The Guy Who Made Her a Star"	35	—	—	—	—	—	—	Sensational	Baby, Come Back
1968	"Softly Softly" b/w "Lonely Rita"	48	—	—	—	—	6	8	Supreme	Supreme
1969	"Michael and the Slipper Tree" b/w "Honey Gum"	24	—	68	—	—	7	—	Equals Strike Again	Non-album tracks
1969	"Viva Bobby Joe" b/w "I Can't Let You Go"	6	—	79	—	3	12	9	A: Equals Strike Again; B: Non-album track	Non-album tracks
1969	"Rub a Dub Dub" b/w "After the Lights Go Down Low"	34	—	—	—	—	4	—	A: Equals at the Top; B: Equals Strike Again	Non-album tracks
1970	"Soul Brother Clifford" b/w "Happy Birthday Girl"	—	—	—	—	—	14	—	Equals at the Top	Non-album tracks
1970	"I Can See But You Don't Know" b/w "Gigolo Sam"	—	—	—	—	—	22	—	A: Doin' the 45's B: Equals at the Top	Non-album tracks
1970	"Black Skin Blue Eyed Boys" b/w "Ain't Got Nothing to Give You"	9	—	—	—	—	35	—	A: Doin' the 45's B: Equals Strike Again	Non-album tracks
1971	"Help Me Simone" b/w "Love Potion"	—	—	—	—	—	49	—	A: Equals at the Top; B: Supreme	A: Non-album track B: Supreme
1972	"Stand Up and Be Counted" b/w "What Would You Do to Survive"	—	—	—	—	—	—	—	Non-album tracks	Non-album tracks
1972	"Have I the Right" b/w "Lover Let Me Go"	—	—	—	—	—	—	—	A: The Equals Greatest Hits; B: Non-album track	Non-album tracks
1973	"Honey Bee" b/w "Put Some Rock and Roll in Your Soul"	—	—	—	—	—	—	—	Rock Around the Clock Volume 1	Non-album tracks
1973	"Diversion" b/w "Here Today, Gone Tomorrow"	—	—	—	—	—	—	—	A: Rock Around the Clock Volume 1 B: Non-album track	Non-album tracks
1975	"Georgetown Girl" b/w "We've Got It All Worked Out"	—	—	—	—	—	—	—	Non-album tracks	Non-album tracks
1976	"Kaywana Sunshine Girl" b/w "Soul Mother"	—	—	—	—	—	—	—	Born Ya!	Non-album tracks
1976	"Funky Like a Train" b/w "If You Didn't Miss Me"	—	—	—	—	—	—	—	Born Ya!	Non-album tracks
1977	"Irma La Douce" b/w "Ire Harry"	—	—	—	—	—	—	—	Born Ya!	Non-album tracks
1977	"Beautiful Clown" b/w "Daily Love"	—	—	—	—	—	—	—	Non-album tracks	Non-album tracks
1978	"Red Dog" b/w "Something Beautiful"	—	—	—	—	—	—	—	Mystic Syster	Non-album tracks
1983	"No Place to Go" b/w "Back Streets"	—	—	—	—	—	—	—	All the Hits Plus More	Non-album tracks
1987	"Funky Like a Train" b/w "Born Ya!"	82	—	—	—	—	—	—	Born Ya!	Non-album tracks
2022	"Nobody's Got Time"	—	—	—	—	—	—	—	–	
"—" denotes releases that did not chart or were not released in that territory.

== See also ==
- List of artists who reached number one on the UK Singles Chart
- List of number-one singles from the 1960s (UK)
- UK No.1 Hits of 1968
- List of 1960s one-hit wonders in the United States
- List of performances on Top of the Pops
- List of performers on Top of the Pops
- Caribbean music in the United Kingdom
- IBC Studios
- Laurie Records
