= Garageland (song) =

Song by the Clash

from the album The Clash
- Language: English
- Released: 8 April 1977
- Recorded: 27 February 1977, London
- Genre: Punk rock
- Length: 3:12
- Label: CBS
- Composer: Mick Jones
- Lyricist: Joe Strummer
- Producer: Mickey Foote

"Garageland" is a song by the English rock band the Clash featured as the final track for their debut studio album, The Clash (1977).

The song was written by Joe Strummer as a response to music journalist Charles Shaar Murray, who, after a gig in 1976, wrote a review saying that they were "the kind of garage band who should be returned to the garage immediately". It also served as a declaration to their fans – and their new record company, with which they had signed a contract for £100,000 on 25 January 1977, – that they would still remain the same as they were before the signing.

== Writing and recording ==
The Clash "Garageland" (1977)
27-second sample from The Clash's "Garageland".

I never want that to happen. After our second gig a critic in New Musical Express wrote that we should be returned to the garage and locked in with a motor running so that we died. "Garageland" is about that. I was trying to say that this is where we come from and we know it, and we're not going to get out of our depth. Even though we've signed with C.B.S. we aren’t going to float off into the atmosphere like the Pink Floyd or anything.

— Joe Strummer

Joe was really excited about this idea of a garage band, that led to the song "Garageland". He really thought, ‘We belong in a garage.’ He'd hit on something like that and get very, very excited and live off that for a few days. Then he'd be depressed about something else and he'd come in and say, ‘We're not really a garage band at all.’

— Terry Chimes

Joe would go into everything at a million miles an hour and then change his mind.

— Bernard Rhodes

Upon the Clash's early appearance at the Sex Pistols Screen on the Green concert, Charles Shaar Murray, an NME critic, produced a damning review of the band:

The Clash are the kind of garage band who should be returned to the garage immediately, preferably with the engine running, which would undoubtedly be more of a loss to their friends and families than to either rock or roll.

Followed by:

Their guitarist on the extreme left, allegedly known as Joe Strummer, has good moves but he and the band are a little shaky on ground that involves starting, stopping and changing chords at approximately the same time.

The Clash reacted immediately by writing the song "Garageland", whose opening verses are: "Back in the garage with my bullshit detector / Carbon monoxide making sure it's effective", followed by the chorus: "We're a garage band / We come from garageland", and concluding with "Back in the garage".

Another theme in the song is about the band signing to CBS Records on 25 January 1977 for £100,000. The music press and fans criticized the Clash for having "sold out" to the establishment. Mark Perry, founder of the leading London punk periodical, Sniffin' Glue, let loose with what he would later call his "big quote": "Punk died the day The Clash signed to CBS." This was evidenced in the verses: "Meanwhile things are hotting up in the West End alright / Contracts in the offices and groups in the night / My bumming slumming friends have all got new boots / And someone just asked me if the group would wear suits", and, after the chorus, with the following lines: "I don't want to hear about what the rich are doing / I don't want to go to where the rich are going / They think they're so clever, they think they're so right / But the truth is only known by gutter snipes".

"Garageland", as well as the majority of the band's debut studio album, was conceived on the 18th floor of a council high rise on London's Harrow Road, in a flat that was rented by Jones' grandmother, who frequently went to see the band rehearsing. The song was recorded at CBS Whitfield Street Studio No. 3 on 27 February 1977. The tapes for the entire album were delivered to CBS at the start of March and the recording was released in the United Kingdom through CBS Records on 8 April 1977. The album was engineered by CBS staff engineer Simon Humphrey and produced by Clash live soundman Mickey Foote.

== Personnel ==
- Joe Strummer – lead vocal, lead guitar
- Mick Jones – backing vocal, lead guitar, rhythm guitar, harmonica
- Paul Simonon – bass guitar
- Terry Chimes – drums

== Appearances ==
The song made its live debut on 10–11 March 1977, on the first and second night of an early gig at The Coliseum in Harlesden, London, where the band was supported by Subway Sect, Buzzcocks, and the Slits. From that moment to 1985, the song has become a stable part of the setlists of their future tours and concerts, and has graced stages all over the world. Among the most important venues, concert halls and arenas there were:

- De Montfort Hall in Leicester (1977),
- the Lyceum Theatre, London (1978),
- the Agora in Cleveland (1979),
- the New York Palladium (1979),
- the Capitol Theatre in Passaic, New Jersey (1980),
- the Orpheum Theatre in Boston (1980),
- the Hammersmith Palais in London (1980),
- the Théâtre Mogador in Paris (1981),
- the Brixton Academy in London (1982 & 1985),
- the Saint Paul Civic Center Arena in St Paul, Minnesota (1982),
- the Johanneshovs Isstadion in Stockholm (1984),
- the Éspace Ballard in Paris (1984),
- the Orange arena at the Roskilde Festival of 1985 in Denmark.

"Garageland" was first featured as the last track of the band's debut album as well as in its 1979 US release. It also is featured in many unofficial and semi-official bootlegs such as the 1992 release of U.S.A. 1979. It was featured in the 1980 film release Rude Boy, where it was performed live at Rehearsal Rehearsals, but the audio was re-recorded at Wessex Studios, and on The Punk Rock Movie, directed and filmed by Don Letts mainly at The Roxy club in Super 8 in the autumn of 1977 during the Clash's White Riot tour, and published in DVD format in 1992. "Garageland" is also featured on some live and compilation albums, most notably on Clash on Broadway and The Essential Clash, both released in 2003, Rarities released in 2003, and Pearl Harbour '79 released in 1979 in Japan and in 2004 worldwide.

== Reception ==
Ironically, only two years after the 1976 review that inspired the band to write "Garageland", in NME Murray called the Clash "the greatest rock band in the world".

== Tributes ==
"Garageland" is also featured on tribute albums such as City Rockers: A Tribute To The Clash, released on 6 July 1999 by various artists throughout Chord Records where the song was performed by the Sick. White Riot: A Tribute To The Clash (Vol. Two) released in 2003 by various artists and performed by Billy Bragg with Wiggy, the Neurotics, and Attila & The Stockbroker, Charlie Does Surf: A Tribute To The Clash released in 2004 by various artists where the song was performed by the Glasgow Tiki Shakers with Bill McGlynnon guitar, Joyce Seko on bass, and Bruce Graham on drums, and Revolution Rock: Joe Strummer Memorial Night At Klubi, Tampere Finland released in December 2006 by various artists throughout LampLite Ltd. and performed by the Control with ex-Hanoi Rocks' Stefan Piesnack and Tumppi Varonen on vocals.

The New Zealand indie rock band Garageland, as well as a UK magazine published by Transition Edition, (and a tribute band from Dublin Ireland) are named after this song.

== Covers ==
"Garageland" has been performed by a number of bands, including :

- Welsh band The Oppressed (Oi!)
- English band The Housemartins (indie pop)
- British band Chumbawamba (punk rock, world, folk). Chumbawamba guitarist Boff Whalley ('Boffo') also performs an ironic solo version of the song on the Crass Records released Bullshit Detector 2 compilation album (released 1982)
- New York band Urban Blight (ska, reggae, new jack swing)
- Californian band Manic Hispanic (punk rock, chicano rock)
- Finnish musician Pelle Miljoona (punk rock)
- Italian band Gang (in Italian) (acoustic version)
- Italian band Linea (in Italian)
