= Washington Bullets (song) =

Song by the Clash

from the album Sandinista!
- Released: 12 December 1980
- Genre: Post-punk
- Length: 3:51
- Label: CBS
- Songwriters: Mick Jones; Joe Strummer

"Washington Bullets" is a song from the Clash's fourth studio album Sandinista! (1980). A politically charged song, it is a simplified version of imperialist history from the 1959 Cuban Revolution to the Nicaraguan Sandinistas of the 1980s, with mention of the Bay of Pigs Invasion, the Dalai Lama, Salvador Allende and Víctor Jara, referencing his death at the hands of the Chilean military dictatorship in the stadium that now bears his name. Although mainly a criticism of the foreign policy of the United States, the song's final stanza also delivers a criticism of Communist states by making reference to the treatment of pacifist Buddhist monks in the People's Republic of China during the Cultural Revolution and the Soviet Union's Invasion of Afghanistan.

The song's title is often thought to have been a pun on the name of Washington DC's basketball team, the Washington Bullets (now called the Washington Wizards), but frontman Joe Strummer denied any knowledge of the basketball team prior to the song's release.

The song is one of the Clash's more experimental, in the reggae style, with a marimba and lyrics that are almost spoken rather than sung.

On the tribute album The Clash Tribute: The Never Ending Story, the song was covered by Attila the Stockbroker, with new lyrics to the later verses, omitting the reference to Afghanistan and the Clash's subtle attack on communism. The new verses are critical of US involvement in the end of the Soviet Union, and Boris Yeltsin's embrace of western-style capitalism, making particular disparaging references to the new world order following the end of the Cold War.

Filmmaker Martin McDonagh has said that he first learned about the 1973 Chilean coup, and the torture and murder of detainees at Estadio Chile – events referenced throughout his film Wild Horse Nine – in "Washington Bullets".

== See also ==
- List of anti-war songs
