= Best Dressed Chicken in Town =

Compilation album by Dr. Alimantado
- Released: 1978
- Recorded: 1972–78
- Studios: Black Ark, King Tubby's Studio, Channel One Studios, Randy's Studio
- Genre: Reggae
- Label: Greensleeves/Barclay/Keyman
- Producer: Dr. Alimantado

Dr. Alimantado chronology
Best Dressed Chicken in Town (1978)	Sons of Thunder (1981)

Professional ratings
Review scores
Source	Rating
Allmusic	4.5/5 stars

Best Dressed Chicken in Town is the debut album by Jamaican deejay Dr. Alimantado. It was first released in 1978, and collects many of his self-produced singles from 1972 to 1978, employing the engineering talents of Lee "Scratch" Perry, King Tubby, and Scientist. It was the first album released by Greensleeves Records, and found favour with followers of both reggae and punk rock in the United Kingdom. The album employed several major hits as the basis for the tracks, including Horace Andy's versions of "Ain't No Sunshine" (on the title track) and "A Quiet Place" ("Poison Flour" and "I Shall Fear No Evil"), John Holt's "Ali Baba" ("I Killed the Barber"), and Gregory Isaacs' "Thief a Man" (on "Gimmie Mi Gun") and "My Religion" ("Unitone Skank"). The album was described by The Independent as "one of the finest albums from reggae's golden age".

The front cover photography is credited to D.K. James and the back cover artwork and photography to David Hendley.

== Release history ==
The album was originally issued in 1978 on Greensleeves and on the Barclay label. The album was reissued on Alimantado's own Keyman label on vinyl and CD in 1987, with extra tracks from that era, and reissued in 2001 by Greensleeves as part of their reissue programme of classic albums. In 2007 the album was reissued again to mark Greensleeves' 30th anniversary.

== Track listing ==
All tracks composed and arranged by Winston Thompson

=== Original album release ===
1. "Best Dressed Chicken in Town" engineer - Upsetter at Black Ark, 1974
2. "Just The Other Day" vocals - Droopy; engineer - King Tubby at King Tubby's, 1973
3. "Poison Flour" vocals - Horace Andy; engineer - Philip Smart at King Tubby's, 1975
4. "Gimmie Mi Gun" vocals - Gregory Isaacs; engineer - Lancelot "Maxie" McKenzie at Channel One, 1976
5. "I Killed The Barber" vocals - Jackie Edwards; engineer - Philip Smart at King Tubby's, 1975
6. "Unitone Skank" vocals - Gregory Isaacs; engineer - Pat Kelly at Randy's, 1976
7. "Can't Conquer Natty Dreadlocks" engineer - Upsetter at Black Ark, 1974
8. "Ride On" vocals - Jah Woosh and Jimmy Radwell; engineer - Upsetter at Black Ark, 1973
9. "Plead I Cause" engineer - King Tubby at King Tubby's, 1973
10. "I Shall Fear No Evil" engineer - Philip Smart at King Tubby's, 1975

=== 1987 Keyman/2001 Greensleeves releases ===
1. "Best Dressed Chicken in Town"
2. "Just The Other Day"
3. "Poison Flour"
4. "Gimmie Mi Gun"
5. "I Killed The Barber"
6. "Ital Galore" engineer - King Tubby
7. "I am the Greatest Says Muhammad Ali" engineer - Upsetter
8. "Johnny Was a Baker" engineer - Augustus "Gussie" Clarke
9. "Tribute to the Duke"
10. "Unitone Skank"
11. "Can't Conquer Natty Dreadlocks"
12. "Ride On"
13. "Plead I Cause"
14. "I Shall Fear No Evil"

=== 2007 Greensleeves 30th anniversary release ===
1. "Best Dressed Chicken in Town"
2. "Just The Other Day"
3. "Poison Flour"
4. "Gimmie Mi Gun"
5. "I Killed The Barber"
6. "Unitone Skank"
7. "Can't Conquer Natty Dreadlocks"
8. "Ride On"
9. "Plead I Cause"
10. "I Shall Fear No Evil"
11. "Ital Galore"
12. "I am the Greatest Says Muhammad Ali"
13. "Johnny Was a Baker"
14. "Tribute to the Duke"
