= The Clash (album) =

1977 studio album by The Clash

- Standard UK edition

Studio album by the Clash
- Released: 8 April 1977
- Recorded: 10–27 February 1977
- Studios: CBS, London; National Film and Television School, Beaconsfield, England
- Genre: Punk rock
- Length: 35:18
- Label: CBS
- Producer: Mickey Foote

The Clash chronology
The Clash (1977)	Give 'Em Enough Rope (1978)

Singles from The Clash
- 1. "White Riot" Released: 18 March 1977; 2. "Remote Control" Released: 13 May 1977

The Clash is the debut studio album by the English punk rock band the Clash, released on 8 April 1977 through CBS Records. Recorded and mixed over three weeks in February 1977 for £4,000, it would go on to reach No. 12 on the UK charts, and has been included on many retrospective rankings as one of the greatest punk albums of all time.

Songs on the album were composed by guitarists Joe Strummer and Mick Jones, with the exception of the reggae cover "Police and Thieves". The song "What's My Name" is co-credited to Clash founding member Keith Levene, who left the band in September 1976.

Several songs from the album's recording sessions, including "Janie Jones", "White Riot", and "London's Burning" became classics of the punk genre and were among the first punk songs to see significant presence on singles charts. The Clash featured Jones and Strummer sharing guitar and vocal duties, with Paul Simonon on bass and Terry Chimes on drums, his only studio appearance with the band (Chimes and Rob Harper drummed intermittently with the Clash until Topper Headon joined the band as permanent drummer in May 1977). Chimes was credited as "Tory Crimes" on the album's original sleeve.

The Clash was not released in the US until 1979, making it the band's second US release. The US version also included a significantly different track listing, changing the track order and swapping out several songs for non-album tracks recorded in the interim.

== Background ==
Most of the album was conceived on the 18th floor of a council high rise on London's Harrow Road, in a flat that was rented by Mick Jones's grandmother, who frequently went to see their live concerts. The album was recorded over three consecutive Thursday-to-Sunday sessions at CBS Studio 3 in February 1977. By the third of these sessions, the album was recorded and mixed to completion, with the tapes being delivered to CBS at the start of March and the album released on 8 April 1977. It cost £4,000 to produce.

=== Album cover ===
The cover artwork was designed by Polish artist Rosław Szaybo. The album's front cover photo, shot by Kate Simon, was taken in the alleyway directly opposite the front door of the band's 'Rehearsal Rehearsals' building in Camden Market. Drummer Terry Chimes, though a full member of the Clash at the time, did not appear in the picture as he had already decided to leave the group. Another picture from the same Kate Simon photoshoot appears on the UK Special Edition DVD of Rude Boy, released in 2003. The picture of the charging police officers on the rear, shot by Rocco Macauly, was taken during the 1976 riot at the Notting Hill Carnival—the inspiration for the track "White Riot".

=== Songs ===
The subject of the opening track, "Janie Jones", was a famous brothel keeper in London during the 1970s. "Remote Control" was written by Mick Jones after the Anarchy Tour and contains pointed observations about the civic hall bureaucrats who had cancelled concerts, the police, big business and especially record companies. CBS decided to release the song as a single without consulting the band. "I'm So Bored with the USA", developed from a Mick Jones song titled "I'm So Bored with You", condemns the Americanization of the UK. "Hate and War", the inverse of the hippy greeting "Peace and Love" is a slogan on the back of Strummer's jacket in a photograph of the band taken by Caroline Coon in November 1976.

"Career Opportunities", the opening track of the second side of the album, attacks the political and economic situation in England at the time, citing the lack of jobs available, and the dreariness and lack of appeal of those that were available.

"Protex Blue", sung by Mick Jones, is about a 1970s brand of condom. It was inspired by the contraceptive vending machine in the Windsor Castle's toilets. The song ends with the shouted phrase "Johnny Johnny!", johnny being a British slang term for a condom.

"White Riot" was a different recording of the Clash's debut single. The song is short and intense, with a chorus of two chords played very fast (five chords are used in the whole song). Lyrically, it is about class economics and race. The version featured on the album was not recorded for the album; the original demo (recorded at Beaconsfield Studios before the band signed to CBS) was used instead.

"Police & Thieves" was added to the album when the group realised that the track listing was too short. Another cover the band played at these sessions was The Wailers' "Dancing Shoes". "Garageland" was written in response to Charles Shaar Murray's damning review of the Clash's early appearance at the Sex Pistols Screen on the Green concert – "The Clash are the kind of garage band who should be returned to the garage immediately, preferably with the engine running". It was the final track recorded for the album.

== Release ==
The Clash was released in the United Kingdom through CBS Records on 8 April 1977, engineered by CBS staff engineer Simon Humphrey and produced by Clash live soundman Mickey Foote, at the (since demolished) CBS Whitfield Street Studio No. 3. The Clash was unusually musically varied for a punk band, with reggae and early rock and roll influences plainly evident.

=== Reception ===
Retrospective professional ratings
Review scores
Source	Rating
AllMusic	5/5 stars
Alternative Press	5/5
The Baltimore Sun	4/4 stars
Classic Rock	5/5 stars
The Encyclopedia of Popular Music	5/5 stars
Q	5/5 stars
Rolling Stone	5/5 stars
The Rolling Stone Album Guide	5/5 stars
Select	5/5
Spin Alternative Record Guide	10/10

The Clash received critical acclaim and peaked at number 12 in the UK charts.

When the album was released in April 1977, Tony Parsons wrote in the New Musical Express: “Jones and Strummer write with graphic perception about contemporary Great British urban reality as though it’s suffocating them … Their songs don’t lie … The Clash have made an album that consists of some of the most exciting rock’n’roll in contemporary music.” Mark Perry declared in Sniffin’ Glue: “The Clash album is like a mirror. It reflects all the shit. It shows us the truth. To me, it is the most important album ever released.” The review by Kris Needs in April 1977's Zigzag announced: “This is the most exciting album I’ve heard in years … it’s one of the most important records ever made.”

In his 1979 consumer guide for The Village Voice, critic Robert Christgau gave the album's US release an "A" grade and stated, "Cut for cut, this may be the greatest rock and roll album (plus limited-edition bonus single) ever manufactured in the U.S. It offers 10 of the 14 titles on the band's British debut as well as 7 of the 13 available only on 45. [...] The U.K. version of The Clash is the greatest rock and roll album ever manufactured anywhere". In his decade-end list for the newspaper, he ranked the UK version as the best album of the 1970s.

In 1993, the New Musical Express ranked the album number 13 on its list of the greatest albums of all time. NME also ranked The Clash number three on its list of the Greatest Albums of the '70s, and wrote in the review that "the speed-freaked brain of punk set to the tinniest, most frantic guitars ever trapped on vinyl. Lives were changed beyond recognition by it".

In 1999, Q magazine wrote that the Clash "would never sound so punk as they did on 1977's self-titled debut", calling it a "lyrically intricate" album that "still howled with anger". In 2000, Alternative Press described The Clash as "the eternal punk album" and "a blueprint for the pantomime of 'punkier' rock acts", concluding that "for all of its forced politics and angst, The Clash continues to sound crucial."

The Clash was voted number 180 in Colin Larkin's All Time Top 1000 Albums (2000). Q placed The Clash at number 48 on its list of the "100 Greatest British Albums Ever" in 2000, and included the album in its "100 Best Punk Albums of All Time" list in 2002. Spin ranked the album at number three on its 2001 list of the "50 Most Essential Punk Records", calling it "punk as alienated rage, as anticorporate blather, as joyous racial confusion, as evangelic outreach and white knuckles and haywire impulses". In 2003, Mojo ranked The Clash at second place on its list of the "Top 50 Punk Albums", deeming it "the ultimate punk protest album". The same year, the US version was ranked number 77 on Rolling Stone's list of the 500 greatest albums of all time. The album was re-ranked at number 81 in 2012, and at number 102 in the 2020 update. The album was included in Robert Dimery's 1001 Albums You Must Hear Before You Die.

== Track listing ==
All lead vocals by Joe Strummer, except where noted.

All tracks are written by Strummer and Mick Jones, except where noted.

Side one
No.	Title	Writer(s)	Lead vocals	Length
1.	"Janie Jones"			2:03
2.	"Remote Control"		Jones; Strummer	3:00
3.	"I'm So Bored with the USA"			2:25
4.	"White Riot"			1:56
5.	"Hate and War"		Jones; Strummer	2:05
6.	"What's My Name"	Strummer; Jones; Keith Levene		1:40
7.	"Deny"			3:03
8.	"London's Burning"			2:12

Side two
No.	Title	Writer(s)	Lead vocals	Length
1.	"Career Opportunities"			1:52
2.	"Cheat"			2:06
3.	"Protex Blue"		Jones	1:42
4.	"Police & Thieves"	Junior Murvin; Lee Perry		6:01
5.	"48 Hours"			1:34
6.	"Garageland"			3:12

== 1979 US version ==
The Clash (US version)

Studio album by the Clash
- Released: 26 July 1979
- Recorded: 1976–1979
- Genre: Punk rock
- Length: 43:20
- Label: Epic
- Producers: Mickey Foote; Lee Perry; The Clash; Sandy Pearlman; Bill Price

The Clash US chronology
Give 'Em Enough Rope (1978)	The Clash (US version) (1979)	London Calling (1979)

Singles from The Clash
- 1. "Complete Control" Released: 23 September 1977; 2. "Clash City Rockers" Released: 17 February 1978; 3. "(White Man) In Hammersmith Palais" Released: 17 June 1978; 4. "I Fought the Law" Released: 26 July 1979

Retrospective professional ratings
Review scores
Source	Rating
The Baltimore Sun	3.5/4 stars
Blender	5/5 stars
Christgau's Record Guide	A
The Rolling Stone Album Guide	5/5 stars
Spin Alternative Record Guide	10/10

In the United States, the Clash's debut studio album was released one year after Give 'Em Enough Rope, making it their second release in the US. CBS in America had decided that the album was 'not radio friendly', so it was initially only available in the States during 1977–1978 as an import, and as such became the best-selling import of the year, selling over 100,000 copies.

In July 1979, Epic released a modified version of the album for the United States market. This version replaced four songs from the original version with five non-album singles and B-sides, some of which were recorded and released after the Clash's second studio album, Give 'Em Enough Rope (1978). It also used the re-recorded single version of "White Riot", rather than the original take featured on the UK version. Owing to its inclusion of non-album singles, the US edition of The Clash could be considered a de facto compilation album.

Omitted from the US version of The Clash were the following tracks:

- "Deny"
- "Cheat"
- "Protex Blue"
- "48 Hours"
- "White Riot" (original version)

Added were the following tracks:

- "Clash City Rockers" – Initially released as a single (A-side) in the UK in February 1978
- "Complete Control" – Initially released as a single (A-side) in the UK in September 1977
- "White Riot" (re-recorded version) – Initially released as a single (A-side) in the UK in March 1977
- "(White Man) In Hammersmith Palais" – Initially released as a single (A-side) in the UK in June 1978
- "I Fought the Law" – Initially released as a track on the Clash EP The Cost of Living in the UK in May 1979
- "Jail Guitar Doors" – Initially released as the B-side to "Clash City Rockers" in the UK in February 1978

Initial copies of the US version also came with a bonus 7-inch single which featured "Groovy Times" and "Gates of the West". The liner notes incorrectly credit new drummer Nicky Headon for "White Riot".

It was another moderately successful album for the Clash in the United States, even though the sales were likely diluted by the longstanding popularity of the UK version on the import market. The Clash peaked at number 126 on the Billboard charts, setting the stage for the commercial breakthrough of London Calling later that year.

Since the Clash's first UK album had already been released in Canada by CBS Records, when CBS Canada released the US version, they changed the cover art so as to not confuse the record-buying public. The CBS Canada version of the LP has a dark blue border instead of green. Initial copies also contained the bonus "Groovy Times" 7". Some original cassette pressings of the US version featured "What's My Name?" as track 4 and "Complete Control" as track 11. Though the back of these original pressings list the two songs as they are featured on recent versions of the album. The US edition of the album was also released in Japan, retitled Pearl Harbour '79 and with the "Gates of the West" b/w "Groovy Times" single attached.

=== Track listing ===
All tracks are written by Strummer and Jones, except where noted.

Side one
No.	Title	Writer(s)	Lead vocals	Length
1.	"Clash City Rockers"		Strummer	3:56
2.	"I'm So Bored with the USA"		Strummer	2:25
3.	"Remote Control"		Jones, Strummer	3:00
4.	"Complete Control"		Strummer	3:14
5.	"White Riot"		Strummer	1:59
6.	"(White Man) In Hammersmith Palais"		Strummer	3:59
7.	"London's Burning"		Strummer	2:12
8.	"I Fought the Law"	Sonny Curtis	Strummer	2:41

Side two
No.	Title	Writer(s)	Lead vocals	Length
1.	"Janie Jones"		Strummer	2:03
2.	"Career Opportunities"		Strummer	1:52
3.	"What's My Name"	Strummer, Jones, Levene	Strummer	1:40
4.	"Hate & War"		Jones, Strummer	2:05
5.	"Police & Thieves"	Murvin, Perry	Strummer	6:01
6.	"Jail Guitar Doors"		Jones	3:05
7.	"Garageland"		Strummer	3:12

== Personnel ==
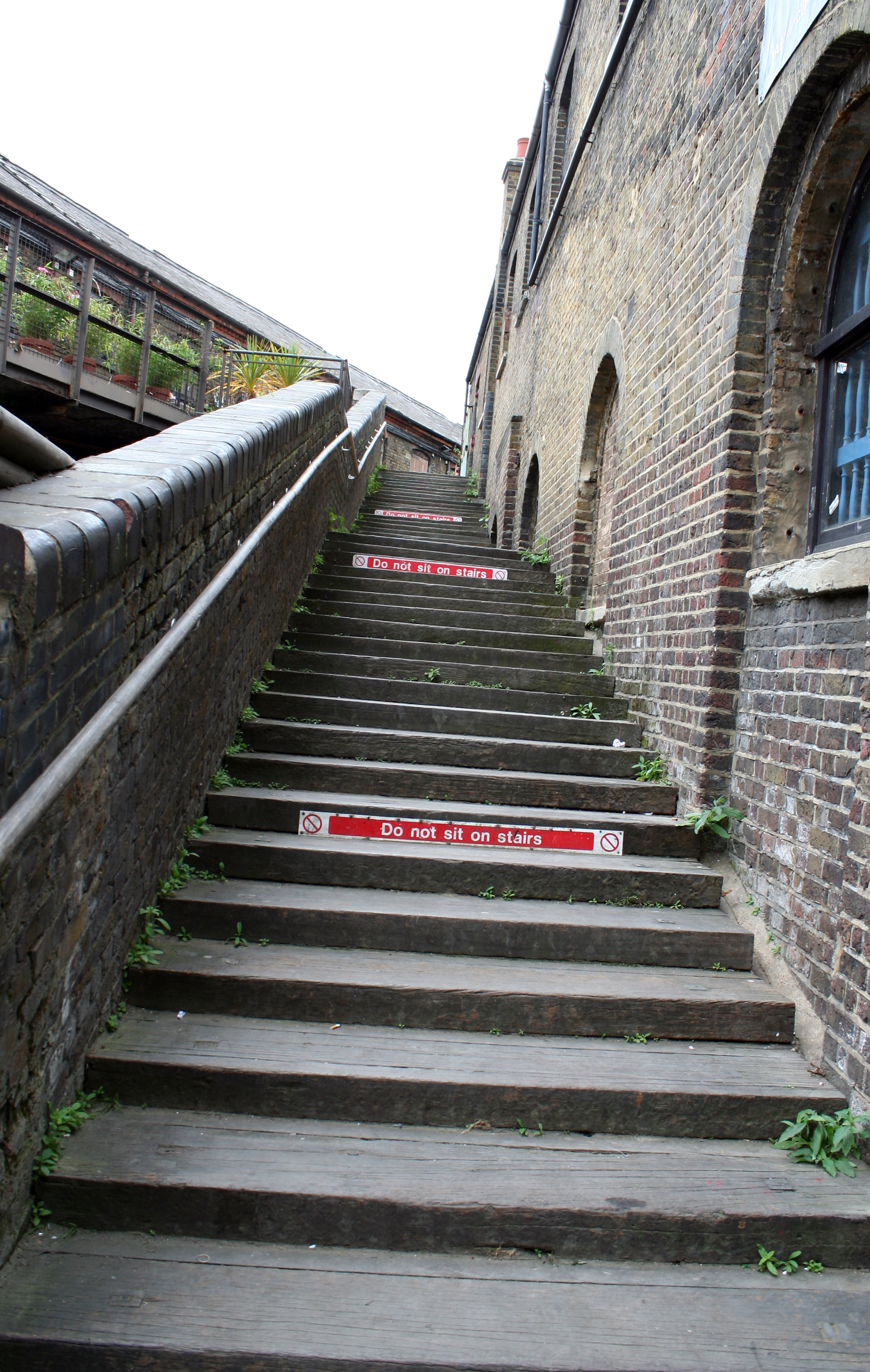
The stairway where the Clash posed for the cover photo, in 2008

=== The Clash ===
- Joe Strummer − vocals, rhythm guitar, lead guitar on "48 Hours", piano and production on US version
- Mick Jones − lead guitar, vocals, production on US version
- Paul Simonon − bass guitar, production on US version
- Terry Chimes (listed as "Tory Crimes") − drums, production on UK version
- Topper Headon − drums on side one tracks 1, 4, 6, and 8 and side two track 6 on US version, production on US version

=== Production ===
- Mickey Foote − production, engineering on US version
- Simon Humphrey − engineering
- Kate Simon − cover art
- Rocco Macauly − back cover photo
- Lee "Scratch" Perry – production on US version
- Sandy Pearlman – production on US version
- Bill Price – production on US version

== Charts ==
=== UK version ===
Chart (1977)	Peak position
Swedish Albums (Sverigetopplistan)	42
UK Albums (Official Charts)	12

2024 weekly chart performance for The Clash
Chart (2024)	Peak position
Greek Albums (IFPI)	10

=== US version ===
Chart (1979)	Peak position
US Billboard 200	126

== Certifications ==
Region	Certification	Certified units/sales
United Kingdom (BPI) UK original release	Gold	100,000^{^}
United Kingdom (BPI) UK re-release	Gold	100,000^{‡}
United Kingdom (BPI) US release	Silver	60,000^{^}
United States (RIAA)	Gold	500,000^{^}
^{^} Shipments figures based on certification alone.^{‡} Sales+streaming figures based on certification alone.
