= Ray Gange =

British actor

Ray Gange (born 1957 or 1958) is a former actor from London, England, best known for his portrayal of the roadie who starred in the film Rude Boy. The film won various awards, but Gange did not continue his film career.

== Rude Boy ==
Before starring in Rude Boy, Ray Gange worked in a record shop in Soho, London, England. Gange knew of The Clash and was friends with Joe Strummer. The two met in a pub in Putney at a time when Strummer lived by Regent's Park.

While working at the record shop, Gange met David Mingay and learned that he was planning to make a film on the band. Mingay invited him to be in the film, but Gange was hesitant to join. Gange went to Strummer to ask about the film and learned that filming would indeed take place. After confirming the plans and receiving Strummer's own invitation, Gange finally agreed to participate in the film.

Gange was signed on to play a roadie. Since he had no prior experience, Bernie Rhodes gave him a job as a roadie on a Subway Sect tour for two weeks.

== Other work ==
During the early 1980s, Gange formed the short-lived record label Gange's Records in order to release records for punk-blues band the Folk Devils, a band which he was then managing. The label managed to release two singles.

In 1997 he obtained a Fine Arts degree from Chelsea School of Art and has since been working in the fields of sculpture and painting with many works in the hands of private collectors.

In 2009, he toured with the Alarm, Los Mondo Bongo and the Mahones as DJ.

In 2010, he toured with Dropkick Murphys, Sick Of It All and the Mahones as DJ.

== Personal life ==
Gange was romantically involved with film director Penelope Spheeris before she went on to direct Wayne's World.

He has a son.
