= Police on My Back =

1967 song by the Equals

Single by the Equals

from the album Explosion
- B-side: "You Got Too Many Boyfriends"
- Released: 6 November 1967
- Recorded: 1967
- Genre: Funk; soul
- Songwriter: Eddy Grant

Official audio
- "Police on My Back" on YouTube

"Police on My Back" is a song written by the British singer Eddy Grant and recorded by his band the Equals for their second studio album Explosion in December 1967.

"Police on My Back"

Single by the Clash

from the album Sandinista!
- A-side: "Hitsville U.K." (US)
- B-side: "The Crooked Beat" (Australia)
- Recorded: 12 December 1980
- Genre: Punk rock

The Clash singles chronology
"The Call Up" / "Stop the World" (1980)	"Police on My Back" / "The Crooked Beat" (1980)	"Hitsville UK" / "Radio One" (1981)

Official audio
- "Police on My Back" on YouTube

The song was described as being: "an expression of Jamaican rude boy culture".

== Covers ==
In 1980, the rock band the Clash recorded a cover version of the song for their fourth studio album Sandinista!, and turned "the mid-paced soul-pop song into a charged-up, full-powered rocker". Their version featured guitarist Mick Jones on lead vocals, and was released as a single, but only in Australia. It was described as a "punk anthem at a time of political and social repression", and as their "most full-throated rock song since 'I Fought the Law'." The Clash version was sampled by Lethal Bizzle for his version of the song, which was released as a single and included on his 2007 album Back to Bizznizz. His version reached number 37 on the UK Singles Chart. Other covers of the song include a Spanish-language version recorded by Amparanoia titled "La semana", released on her debut album El Poder de Machín, and a version performed as a collaboration between Asian Dub Foundation and Zebda for the French TV programme Music Planet 2Nite in February 2003 which was included as a bonus track on ADF's 2003 album Enemy of the Enemy. It was also covered by punk band Culture Abuse in 2018, as well as the American musician Billie Joe Armstrong of Green Day in 2020, during the COVID-19 lockdowns.

== Personnel ==
The Equals

- Derv Gordon – lead vocals
- Eddy Grant – lead guitar
- Pat Lloyd – rhythm guitar
- Lincoln Gordon – rhythm guitar, bass
- John Hall – drums

The Clash

- Joe Strummer – lead and backing vocals, guitar, keyboards
- Mick Jones – guitar, keyboards, lead and backing vocals
- Paul Simonon – bass guitar, backing vocals
- Topper Headon – drums
