= Edward Kassner =

Edward Kassner (28 February 1920 – 19 November 1996) was an Austrian-born music industry executive and songwriter who was responsible for establishing the music publisher Kassner Music and the President record label. He lived and worked in both Britain and the United States.

== Life and career ==
He was born in Vienna to Jewish parents, and aspired to be a composer from an early age. At the time of the German invasion of Austria in 1938, he escaped through Germany, Belgium and the Netherlands to England. His parents both were murdered at Auschwitz. He initially worked in London cutting felt for hats, but began working as a songwriter with lyricist Peter Mulroney. He was then deported as an alien to Australia but, after being allowed to return to the UK, joined the British Army in which he served as an interpreter attached to a Canadian tank corps regiment in France and Germany.

He married in 1944, and with his wife Eileen set up his own music publishing company, the Edward Kassner Music Co. Ltd, at 25 Denmark Street in London. He wrote songs under the name Eddie Cassen, and had his first success in 1946 as co-writer of Vera Lynn's hit recording of "How Lucky You Are". By the early 1950s, he had acquired rights to songs recorded by many leading singers of the day including Frank Sinatra, Perry Como, Nat King Cole and the Inkspots, and opened an office in New York City in 1951. He expanded the business by acquiring several other publishing companies, including Broadway Music Corp. which held the rights to a number of pop standards including "You Made Me Love You", "I'll Be With You In Apple Blossom Time" and "Take Me Out To The Ball Game". He also bought, for $250, the rights to the song "Rock Around The Clock", which became one of the most recorded songs of all time and reportedly sold over 170 million copies.

In 1955, he and his business partners formed President Records in New York, but it had little success and was amalgamated into a larger company by 1961. He then formed another company, Seville Records, which had hits with "Shout! Shout! (Knock Yourself Out)" by Ernie Maresca and "Bobby's Girl" by Marcie Blane, but failed to capitalise on its early successes. He decided to reactivate the President label, partly inspired by the memory of John F. Kennedy after his assassination. Soon afterwards, in 1964, his London office acquired a management and publishing deal with a new group, the Kinks, who had a string of successful releases in both the UK and US starting with "You Really Got Me".

With the British Invasion, Kassner decided to prioritise his activities in the UK, and launched the President label in Britain in 1966. The label's early successes were "Bye Bye Baby" and "The Best Part of Breaking Up" by the Symbols, a London band, and "I Feel Love Comin' On" by Felice Taylor. In 1968 the company had greater success with "Baby, Come Back" by the Equals, a UK no. 1 which also made the US chart and was followed up by a string of hits for the group in the UK. The company also set up a subsidiary label, Jay Boy, for releasing US singles on the TK and other labels in the UK, and had a series of hits in the 1970s with recordings by George McCrae and KC and the Sunshine Band. From the 1980s onwards, Kassner's company had particular success through its association with Rick Wakeman. In 1987 Edward Kassner signed up a young English band leader, Graham Dalby and his band the Grahamophones. Four albums followed plus a Children in Need single on the President label. One of the published songs by Dalby was used as the title of a BBC 2 documentary I'd Sooner Be A Crooner in 1988.

Edward Kassner continued as head of his companies until his death in London in 1996 at the age of 76. His family, in particular his son David Kassner, continue to operate the companies.
