= London's Burning (The Clash song) =

1977 song by the Clash

Song by the Clash

from the album The Clash
- Released: 8 April 1977
- Recorded: March 1977
- Genre: Punk rock
- Length: 2:13
- Label: CBS
- Songwriters: Joe Strummer; Mick Jones
- Producer: Mikey Foote

"London's Burning" is a song by the English rock band the Clash from their eponymous debut studio album. It is the eighth track in the UK version of this album, and the seventh track in the US version, from 1979.

It is sung by Joe Strummer (and Mick Jones, with Paul Simonon in the chorus), who starts the song shouting "London's Burning!" two times. The song continues talking about London's automobile traffic, where young people try to get their kicks driving around in their cars through the night, feeling bored and far from happy.

The song's name came from popular nursery rhyme about the Great Fire of London (1666).

Strummer described his composition of the song and its meaning as follows:

I wrote it in an old sort of disused house, near the Westway. And then I went up to see Mick Jones in the block. That night we kind of whipped it into shape up in his flat. And it was kind of a like a quick one, you know, like 'Think of it, write it, finish it.' And it was all over quick. It's just like not having anything to do. Like not having no place to go. And you just think of a desert. The only activity that I could see was like the moving lights going up and down the motorway like going down the subways and looking at the writing. It's like Wednesday night and it’s the same as Thursday night or Friday night. I just felt the whole place was like bored as hell driving about and watching TV and stuff. So it's like London is burning with boredom. I wrote it to get rid of that feeling.

It was first recorded at CBS Studios London for the sessions for the debut album. An alternative version taken from the "White Riot" promo film in April 1977 was released on the B-side of the controversial "Remote Control" single in May 1977.

== Personnel ==
- Joe Strummer – lead vocals, lead guitar
- Mick Jones – backing vocals, lead guitar
- Paul Simonon – bass guitar
- Terry Chimes – drums
