= Police and Thieves =

Single by Junior Murvin

Single by Junior Murvin

from the album Police and Thieves
- B-side: "Grumbling Dub"
- Released: May 1976 (JA)/July 1976 (UK)
- Recorded: May 1976
- Studio: Black Ark, Kingston, Jamaica
- Genre: Reggae
- Length: 4:04
- Label: Wild Flower; Island WIP 6316
- Songwriters: Junior Murvin; Lee "Scratch" Perry
- Producer: Lee "Scratch" Perry

Official audio
- "Police and Thieves" on YouTube

"Police and Thieves" (a.k.a. "Police and Thief") is a reggae song first recorded by the falsetto singer Junior Murvin in 1976. It was covered by the English rock band the Clash and included on their eponymous debut studio album released in 1977.

== Junior Murvin original version ==
The song was originally written by Junior Murvin. Murvin approached Lee "Scratch" Perry in May 1976 and auditioned the song at Perry's Black Ark studio; Perry decided to record the song the same afternoon, and altered the lyrics slightly. Players on the track included Boris Gardiner (bass), Ernest Ranglin (guitar), Sly Dunbar (drums), Keith Sterling (keyboards), and Joe Cooper (organ), with backing vocals provided by Barry Llewellyn and Earl Morgan of the Heptones.

The next day dub versions were mixed and versions with different lyrics recorded. The song, about gang war and police brutality, was out on the street in a couple of days, backed by the Upsetters' dub version "Grumbling Dub", and became a big hit in Jamaica. Released in Jamaica on Federal Records' Wild Flower subsidiary label (as "Police and Thief"), it was issued in the UK by Island Records in July, and proved to be a bigger sales and club hit in the United Kingdom than in Murvin's and Perry's native Jamaica. It was also successful in the US, where it was issued on the Mango label. Island also issued a 12-inch version with Jah Lion's deejay version "Soldier and Police War", and Glen DaCosta's saxophone version "Magic Touch" added. The song was included as the title track on Murvin's 1977 album.

The song became an anthem in the UK in 1976 as the Notting Hill Carnival erupted into a riot. Joe Strummer and Paul Simonon of the Clash were involved in the rioting, which inspired them to cover the song on their debut album, in a style that they called "'punk reggae', not 'white reggae'".

It appeared in Ted Bafaloukos' 1978 film Rockers, and also in Guy Ritchie's 1998 film Lock, Stock and Two Smoking Barrels. The song has since been re-recorded by Murvin several times; a digital version appeared on a 1987 single produced by Prince Jammy, an acoustic version was included on the 2007 album Inna de Yard, and a new version was released in 2008 on a Ralston Brown-produced single. In 2019, French label Broken Stick Records released a 12-inch with a new vocal version by Murvin himself (recorded in 2006), a brand new deejay cut by U Roy, a melodica version and a dub version.

=== Certifications ===
Region	Certification	Certified units/sales
New Zealand (RMNZ)	Gold	15,000^{‡}
United Kingdom (BPI)	Silver	200,000^{‡}
^{‡} Sales+streaming figures based on certification alone.

== Reception ==
Murvin's version became a Top 30 UK hit in 1980, peaking at no. 23. It was named 'Reggae Single of the Year' by Black Echoes, and placed sixth in the NME's end of year singles chart.

In 2022, Pitchfork named it the 188th best song of the 1970s, saying "Falsetto is frequently used in reggae, but not often is there a track as gently piercing. There's that perfect amount of echo, carrying Murvin's vocal improvisations and the humming chorus along, making them bounce off the walls and charge ever forward."

== The Clash version ==
"Police & Thieves"

Song by the Clash

from the album The Clash
- Released: 8 April 1977
- Recorded: March 1977
- Genre: Punk rock; reggae
- Length: 6:04
- Label: CBS
- Songwriters: Junior Murvin; Lee "Scratch" Perry
- Producer: Micky Foote

The English punk rock band Clash's punk/reggae version appeared on their eponymous debut album. The Clash's version, which is six minutes in length, is an example of a rock band incorporating reggae into their repertoire. Murvin's first commentary was "They have destroyed Jah work!" Perry considered that the Clash had "ruined" the song with their version, but later agreed to work with them nonetheless.

The Clash "Police and Thieves" (1977)
30-second sample—with applied 1-second fadeout—of "Police and Thieves" taken from The Clash

The song had been a rehearsal room favourite of the band. It had not originally been planned for inclusion on The Clash, but an impromptu version the band started playing during a break in a recording session spurred the decision to finalize their own arrangement, record it, and include the finished article on their album.

In the beginning of the song, Joe Strummer reinterprets the line "They're going through a tight wind" as a tribute to the Ramones, already an established American punk band and an influence on the Clash. The lyric line appears in the Ramones' "Blitzkrieg Bop".

Bob Marley was inspired to write his song "Punky Reggae Party" after hearing the Clash's version – his reaction after hearing it for the first time was "It is different, but me like how him feel it".

== Other versions ==
The Clash's version appears on the soundtrack for the Wes Anderson film The Royal Tenenbaums. The song also appears in the Reno 911!: Miami movie where it is performed by Dave Grohl, who is listed in the credits under the pseudonym "Sprechen Sie Deutsch".

Several other versions have been recorded, including several on tribute albums to the Clash. Jazz musician Billy Iuso covered it on his 2015 album Overstanding. The British post-punk band Idles recorded a cover for the soundtrack of Darren Aronofsky's 2025 film Caught Stealing.
