= Junior Murvin =

Jamaican reggae musician (died 2013)

Background information
- Born: Murvin Junior Smith c. 1946; Saint James, Jamaica
- Died: 2 December 2013 (aged 67) Port Antonio, Jamaica
- Genre: Reggae
- Occupation: Musician
- Years active: 1965–2013

Junior Murvin (born Murvin Junior Smith, circa 1946 – 2 December 2013) was a Jamaican reggae musician. He is best known for the single "Police and Thieves", produced by Lee "Scratch" Perry in 1976.

== Early life ==
He was born in Saint James Parish, Jamaica, probably in 1946 though some sources state 1949, and moved to Port Antonio after his father's death. He began singing as a child, influenced particularly by Curtis Mayfield, and began performing in public after his family moved to Montego Bay. He studied mechanics at the Montego Bay Technical High School, and then moved to Trenchtown in Kingston, where he lived with his aunt and auditioned unsuccessfully for Lee Perry and Coxsone Dodd.

== Music career ==
He first recorded under the name Junior Soul for Sonia Pottinger's Gayfeet label, and then began recording regularly for the Crystal label owned by Derrick Harriott, where he had a minor hit with "Solomon" in 1972. He also performed as a member of the Hippy Boys, and later the Mighty Falcons and the Tornadoes, in Kingston's nightclubs and tourist hotels.

In 1976, he auditioned again for Perry with his own song, "Police and Thieves". This time Perry agreed to record him, and the single was released to international commercial success in Jamaica, Britain and elsewhere. Though written in the context of Jamaica's turf wars and police violence, it became closely associated with the rioting at London's Notting Hill Carnival that year. Murvin and Perry co-wrote more songs together and completed an album for Island Records, Police and Thieves, released in 1977 and regarded as one of Perry's best productions. The title song was heard by British punk rock band The Clash, whose version appeared on their debut album released in April 1977. Murvin continued to record singles with Perry, including several versions of Curtis Mayfield songs, and also made recordings with producers Joe Gibbs and Alvin Ranglin. In 1980, Murvin's "Police and Thieves" finally reached the UK Singles Chart, peaking at number 23 after being used in the film, Rockers.

Murvin continued to record through the 1980s, but his singles had less success. However, he sang with one of Jamaica's top bands, Jah Postles, and toured widely in Europe. He recorded with various producers and musicians, including Joe Gibbs, Errol Thompson, Mikey Dread with whom he recorded the 1982 album Bad Man Posse, Henry "Junjo" Lawes, Prince Jammy, and King Tubby. His other local hits included "Miss Kushie", "Cool Out Son", "I'm in Love", "Bad Man Posse", and "Muggers in the Street". He released his last album, Signs and Wonders, in 1989, but continued to record and release singles locally in Jamaica, some of them on his small Murvin label in Port Antonio. His last released recording was a single entitled "Wise Man", released on the London-based Dubwise record label in 1998.

== In popular culture ==
His song “Cool Out Son” was featured on the soundtrack of Skate 3.

== Death ==
Murvin died on 2 December 2013, in a hospital in Port Antonio. His age was reported to be 67 or 64. He had been suffering from diabetes and hypertension.

== Discography ==
=== Albums ===
- Police and Thieves (1977), Island
- Tedious (1978), Mango
- Bad Man Posse (1982), Dread at the Controls
- Muggers in the Street (1984), Greensleeves
- Apartheid (1986), Jammy's
- Signs and Wonders (1988), Live & Learn
- World Cry (1995), Sunvibes
- Inna de Yard (2007), Makasound

== See also ==
- List of reggae musicians
- List of roots reggae artists
- Caribbean music in the United Kingdom
- Island Records discography
