= Career Opportunities (song) =

Song by The Clash

Song by the Clash

from the album The Clash
- Released: 8 April 1977
- Recorded: March 1977
- Genre: Punk rock
- Length: 1:52
- Label: CBS
- Songwriters: Joe Strummer; Mick Jones
- Producer: Mikey Foote

"Career Opportunities" is a song by the English rock band the Clash, recorded for their debut studio album, The Clash, in 1977.

== Background ==
The song attacks the political and economic situation in England at the time, citing the lack of jobs available, particularly to youth, and the dreariness and lack of appeal of those that were available. They specifically mention service in the police forces in addition to jobs that are often perceived as being 'menial' such as a bus driver or ticket inspector, as well as "making tea at the BBC". The song also mentioned service in the military with "I don't wanna go fighting in the tropical heat." Later, the band would change the lyrics during concerts, replacing "tropical heat" with "Falklands Strait". This version of lyrics can be heard on Live at Shea Stadium.

The line "I won't open letter bombs for you" is a reference to a former job of Clash guitarist Mick Jones, opening letters for a British government department to make sure they weren't rigged with mailbombs. The song was named by bassist Paul Simonon.

== Sandinista! version ==
"Career Opportunities"

Song by the Clash

from the album Sandinista!
- Released: 12 December 1980
- Length: 2:30
- Label: CBS, Epic
- Songwriter: the Clash
- Producers: Mikey Dread, the Clash

The song was re-recorded as one of the last songs on the album Sandinista!, with vocal tracks by the very young Luke and Ben Gallagher (keyboardist Mickey Gallagher's sons) over a simple keyboard melody.

== Personnel ==
- Joe Strummer – lead vocals, rhythm guitar
- Mick Jones – lead guitar, backing vocals
- Paul Simonon – bass
- Terry Chimes – drums, percussion
