= Eddy Grant discography =

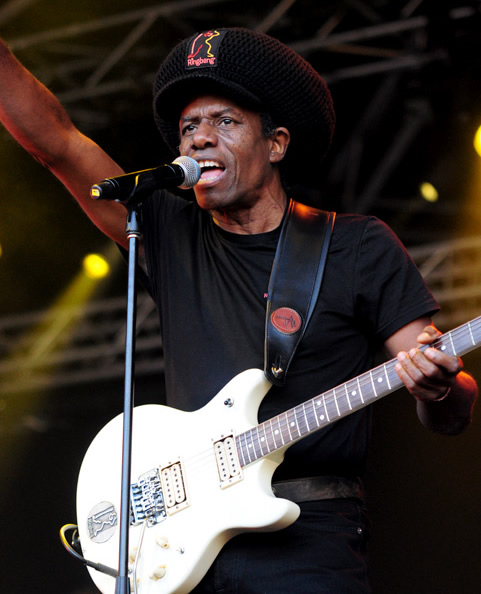
- Studio albums: 15
- Live albums: 1
- Compilation albums: 13
- Singles: 19

Eddy Grant has released 15 studio albums, 13 compilation albums and 19 singles. His album Killer on the Rampage peaked at number 10 on the Billboard 200 chart in the US and was certified gold. His single "Electric Avenue" received Platinum accreditation in the US, and "I Don't Wanna Dance" topped the charts in five countries including Belgium, Ireland and the UK. In 2001, his ringbang remix of "Electric Avenue" reached number 5 in the UK Singles Chart.

== Albums ==
=== Studio albums ===
Title	Album details	Peak chart positions								Certifications (sales thresholds)
Title	Album details	AUS	GER	NZ	NED	SWE	SWI	UK	US	Certifications (sales thresholds)
Eddy Grant	Released: 1975; Label: Torpedo	–	–	–	–	–	–	–	–	
Message Man	Released: 1977; Label: Ice Records	–	–	–	–	–	–	–	–	
Walking on Sunshine	Released: 1979; Label: Ice Records	–	–	–	–	–	–	–	–	
Love in Exile	Released: 1980; Label: Ice Records	–	–	–	–	–	–	–	–	
Can't Get Enough	Released: 1981; Label: Ice Records	–	41	43	–	–	–	39	–	
Killer on the Rampage	Released: 1982; Label: Ice Records	11	11	9	45	30	–	7	10	UK: Silver; US: Gold
Going for Broke	Released: 1984; Label: Ice Records	–	48	–	–	–	–	–	64	
Born Tuff	Released: 1986; Label: Ice Records	–	–	–	–	–	–	–	–	
File Under Rock	Released: 1988; Label: Parlophone & Blue Wave Records	–	48	24	36	–	–	–	–	
Barefoot Soldier	Released: 1990; Label: Enigma Records	–	–	–	–	–	–	–	–	
Paintings of the Soul	Released: 1992; Label: MG Records	–	–	–	–	–	33	–	–	
Soca Baptism	Released: 1993; Label: Ice Records	–	–	–	–	–	–	–	–	
Hearts and Diamonds	Released: 2000; Label: Ice Records	–	–	–	–	–	–	–	–	
Reparation	Released: 2006; Label: Ice Records	–	–	–	–	–	–	–	–	
Plaisance	Released: 2017; Label: Ice Records	–	–	–	–	–	–	–	–	

=== Live albums ===
Title	Album details	Peak chart positions							Certifications (sales thresholds)
Title	Album details	AUT	GER	NZ	NDL	SWE	SWI	UK	Certifications (sales thresholds)
Live at Notting Hill	Released: 1981; Label: Ice Records	–	–	–	–	–	–	–	

=== Compilation albums ===
Title	Album details	Peak chart positions							Certifications (sales thresholds)
Title	Album details	AUT	GER	NZ	NDL	SWE	SWI	UK	Certifications (sales thresholds)
The Killer at His Best – All the Hits	Released: 1984; Label: K-Tel	–	–	–	–	–	–	23	UK: Silver
At His Best POL release only	Released: 1985; Label: Tonpress	–	–	–	–	–	–	–	
Eddy Grant GDR release only	Released: 1986; Label: Amiga	–	–	–	–	–	–	–	
Walking on Sunshine – The Very Best of Eddy Grant	Released: 1989; Label: Parlophone & Blue Wave Records	–	22	–	–	–	–	20	UK: Silver
The Very Best of... Canada release only	Released: 1993; Label: Quality Records	–	–	–	–	–	–	–	
The Best of Eddy Grant	Released: 1995; Label: Music for Pleasure	–	–	–	–	–	–	–	
Greatest Hits	Released: 1996; Label: EMI Gold	–	–	–	–	–	–	–	
The Complete Collection DEN release only	Released: 1998; Label: CMC Special	–	–	–	–	–	–	–	
Grant's Greatest	Released: 1999; Label: Arcade	–	–	–	–	–	–	–	
Greatest Hits Collection	Released: 1999; Label: Sequel Records	–	–	–	–	–	–	–	
Hits from the Frontline	Released: 1999; Label: Sequel Records	–	–	–	–	–	–	–	
The Greatest Hits	Released: 2001; Label: East West Records & Ice Records	19	78	2	61	24	69	3	UK: Platinum
The Very Best of Eddy Grant Road to Reparation	Released: 2008; Label: Universal Records	–	–	–	–	–	–	14	UK: Silver

== Singles ==
Year	Single	Chart Position										Certifications	Album
Year	Single	AUS	BEL	CAN	GER	IRE	NED	NZ	SWI	UK	US	Certifications	Album
1978	"Say I Love You"	—	—	—	—	—	—	—	—	—	—		Walking on Sunshine
1979	"Walking on Sunshine"	—	—	—	—	—	—	—	—	—	—		Walking on Sunshine
1979	"Living on the Front Line"	—	29	—	—	—	—	—	—	11	—		Walking on Sunshine
1979	"Grandma"	—	—	—	—	—	—	—	—	—	—		Non-album single
1980	"My Turn to Love You"	—	—	—	—	—	18	—	—	—	—		Love in Exile
1980	"Do You Feel My Love"	35	8	—	12	16	8	3	3	8	—	UK: Silver	Can't Get Enough
1981	"Can't Get Enough of You"	—	—	—	22	19	—	26	12	13	—		Can't Get Enough
1981	"I Love You, Yes I Love You"	—	—	—	58	—	—	—	—	37	—		Can't Get Enough
1981	"Time to Let Go"	—	—	—	—	—	—	—	—	—	—		Can't Get Enough
1982	"I Don't Wanna Dance"	21	1	15	7	1	2	1	1	1	53	UK: Gold	Killer on the Rampage
1983	"Electric Avenue"	2	3	1	9	3	8	32	6	2	2	UK: Silver; US: Platinum	Killer on the Rampage
1983	"War Party"	—	—	—	47	7	—	—	11	42	—		Killer on the Rampage
1983	"Till I Can't Take Love No More"	94	37	—	26	—	—	—	14	42	—		Going for Broke
1984	"Romancing the Stone"	50	—	7	42	—	—	28	—	52	26		Going for Broke
1984	"Boys in the Street"	—	—	—	—	—	—	—	—	78	—		Going for Broke
1984	"Baby Come Back"	—	—	—	58	—	—	—	—	—	—		The Killer At His Best – All the Hits
1986	"Dance Party"	—	—	—	—	—	—	—	—	—	—		Born Tuff
1988	"Gimme Hope Jo'anna"	79	1	—	4	—	1	3	2	7	—		File Under Rock
1988	"Harmless Piece of Fun"	—	30	—	—	—	76	—	—	90	—		File Under Rock
1988	"Put a Hold on It"	—	—	—	—	—	—	—	—	79	—		File Under Rock
1989	"Walking on Sunshine" (Tim Simenon remix)	—	—	—	—	—	—	—	—	63	—		Walking on Sunshine – The Very Best of Eddy Grant
1989	"Baby Come Back" (Summer mix)	—	—	—	—	—	—	—	—	—	—		Walking on Sunshine – The Very Best of Eddy Grant
1990	"Restless World"	—	—	—	—	—	—	—	—	—	—		Barefoot Soldier
2001	"Electric Avenue" (remix)	—	54	—	68	11	31	—	100	5	—		The Greatest Hits
2001	"Walking on Sunshine" (remix)	—	—	—	—	—	—	—	—	57	—		The Greatest Hits
"—" denotes releases that did not chart
