= The Greatest Hits (Eddy Grant album) =

Greatest hits album by Eddy Grant
- Released: 2001
- Label: East West; Ice; London
- Producer: Eddy Grant

Eddy Grant chronology
Hearts and Diamonds (2000)	The Greatest Hits (2001)	Reparation (2006)

The Greatest Hits is a greatest hits album by Guyanese-British singer, songwriter and musician Eddy Grant, released in 2001. It includes singles and album tracks mostly taken from seven of Grant's solo studio albums, plus a remix of "Electric Avenue" which was released as a single prior to the release of The Greatest Hits, reaching number five in the UK singles chart.

== Critical reception ==
In a review for AllMusic, Stephen Thomas Erlewine wrote that The Greatest Hits "opens up with a 2001 remix of "Electric Avenue," which signals that it is targeted at a younger, newer audience. He went on to opine that "Perhaps it would have been better if [the album] had been more logically assembled, but this has the hits and is quite entertaining, thereby serving the needs of most listeners."

== Track listing ==
All tracks written by Eddy Grant.

No.	Title	Origin	Length
1.	"Electric Avenue" (Ringbang Remix Radio Edit)	new version (2001)	3:09
2.	"I Don't Wanna Dance"	Killer on the Rampage (1982)	3:38
3.	"Killer on the Rampage"	Killer on the Rampage	3:28
4.	"Can't Get Enough of You"	Can't Get Enough (1981)	4:16
5.	"Living on the Frontline"	Walking on Sunshine (1978)	5:56
6.	"Hello Africa"	Message Man (1977)	5:47
7.	"Gimme Hope Jo'anna"	File Under Rock (1988)	3:42
8.	"Another Revolutionary"	Killer on the Rampage	5:13
9.	"Latin Love Affair"	Killer on the Rampage	4:18
10.	"Do You Feel My Love"	Can't Get Enough	2:58
11.	"Baby Come Back"	re-recording of song by Grant's band The Equals (1984)	3:14
12.	"War Party"	Killer on the Rampage	3:36
13.	"Walking on Sunshine"	Walking on Sunshine	5:18
14.	"Nobody's Got Time"	Love in Exile (1980)	7:17
15.	"Electric Avenue" (original version)	Killer on the Rampage	3:42
16.	"Ten Out of Ten"	Hearts and Diamonds (2000)	3:55

Note

- The US version of The Greatest Hits contains 17 tracks, adding "Romancing the Stone" (4:50) as track 4, from the album Going for Broke (1984).

== Charts ==
Chart performance for The Greatest Hits
Chart (2001)	Peak position
Austrian Albums (Ö3 Austria)	19
Dutch Albums (Album Top 100)	61
German Albums (Offizielle Top 100)	78
New Zealand Albums (RMNZ)	2
Swedish Albums (Sverigetopplistan)	24
Swiss Albums (Schweizer Hitparade)	69
UK Albums (Official Charts)	3

== Certifications ==
Region	Certification	Certified units/sales
United Kingdom (BPI)	Platinum	300,000^{^}
^{^} Shipments figures based on certification alone.
