= Born Tuff =

Studio album by Eddy Grant
- Released: August 1986
- Studios: Blue Wave Studios, St. Philip, Barbados
- Genres: Pop rock; reggae; R&B
- Length: 52:09 (Initial CD version); 42:13 (Abridged version)
- Labels: Ice; Portrait
- Producer: Eddy Grant

Eddy Grant chronology
Going for Broke (1984)	Born Tuff (1986)	File Under Rock (1988)

Singles from Born Tuff
- 1. "Dance Party" Released: 21 July 1986; 2. "Baby Come Back (Summer Mix)" Released: 1989 (UK)

Born Tuff is the eighth studio album by British-Guyanese singer-songwriter Eddy Grant, released in 1986 through Portrait Records in the US and Grant's own label Ice Records elsewhere. The album was recorded to completion at Grant's self-owned Blue Wave Studios in St. Philip, Barbados. The engineering duties were shared between Alan Smart, Frank Aggarrat, Ray Bardani, and on the closing track "Water" (from the film of the same name), Grant himself. It for the most part failed to replicate the success of Grant's previous two albums, and neither the album nor either of its singles charted anywhere in the world.

== Background ==
The opening track "Dance Party" was announced for release as a single on Music Week and Record Mirror on 12 July 1986, and was backed with "Rock You Good", a track from Grant's previous album, Going for Broke. The 12" version included an extended mix of "Dance Party". By 30 August, the song had been playlisted by 15 radio stations in Britain. A music video for the song entered rotation on MTV the week of 10 September, and the song was later referenced in a 2023 article for the Ugandan newspaper Daily Monitor. The album was announced as a "new release" on the 30 August 1986 issue of Billboard.

"Melody of the Night" was inspired by Grant's childhood home in Plaisance, Guyana.

The title track is dedicated to anti-Apartheid activist Nelson Mandela, who at the time of this album's release, had been imprisoned since 1964.

"Baby Come Back" is a re-recording of the Equals' hit, which was penned by Grant during his time with that band. The version released on this album is about a minute longer than his previously released 1984 recording, which clocked in at 4:06, and was reissued as a single in 1989 as the "Summer Mix."

"Water" was released prior to the album on the soundtrack for the film of the same name, and the version on this album, like "Baby Come Back," runs about a minute longer than its previous iteration, which had a duration of 3:56.

== Reception ==
Professional ratings
Review scores
Source	Rating
AllMusic	2.5/5 stars
Billboard	(favorable)
Cashbox	(favorable)

Billboard gave a favorable review, calling "Blood Money" and "Village Life" standouts, but noted "there's nothing to ignite the commercial fire sparked by 'Electric Avenue.'" In their "Feature Picks" section, Cashbox said of the album, "Grant crosses the reggae/pop fence about as well as any. The first single, 'Dance Party,' should stir interest in the LP." "Dance Party" was also a "Feature Pick" on Cashbox, which described it, "With Jamaican rhythms and inflections, Grant is back with an infectious and appealing dance single." In a retrospective review, AllMusic's Jo-Ann Greene describes "Blood Money" as "a vitriolic indictment of the IMF, the Jamaican government, and American complicity in it all", "Village Life" as "a perky little number, Afro-beat driven and boasting a superb faux-sax solo", and "Funny Little Groove" as being "built around a particularly tough, funky rhythm." Despite these favorable reviews, however, neither Born Tuff nor "Dance Party" charted in the US or UK.

== Track listing ==
All tracks are written by Eddy Grant.

No.	Title	Engineer	Length
1.	"Dance Party"	Aggarrat	4:20
2.	"Next Time Around"	Smart	3:18
3.	"Come Along to My Place"	Aggarrat	4:05
4.	"Melody of the Night"	Smart	4:19
5.	"Born Tuff"	Smart	5:07
6.	"Baby Come Back"	Bardani	4:59
7.	"Blood Money"	Smart	4:32
8.	"Village Life"	Aggarrat	4:00
9.	"Funny Little Groove"	Smart	4:19
10.	"In L.A."	Bardani	4:23
11.	"She's Standing at the Corner"	Bardani	3:54
12.	"Water"	Grant and Smart	4:53
Total length:			52:09

*Tracks 6 and 12 were omitted from worldwide LP and cassette releases, all US releases, and reissues after 1987.

== Personnel ==
Adapted from the liner notes:

Musicians

- Eddy Grant - all instruments and vocals except:
- Tom Bailey and Alannah Currie - backing vocals (track 1)
- Alan Smart - news announcer (track 7)

Technical

- Eddy Grant - production, engineering (track 12)
- Ray Bardani, Alan Smart, Frank Aggarrat - engineering
- Martyn Goddard - lenswork
- Mainartery - sleeve assembly
