= Can't Get Enough of You (Eddy Grant song) =

- German picture sleeve

Single by Eddy Grant

from the album Can't Get Enough
- B-side: "Neighbour, Neighbour" (7" & 12"); "Time Warp" (12")
- Released: 27 March 1981
- Recorded: 1981
- Studio: The Coach House Recording Studios, Stamford Hill, London
- Genre: Reggae
- Length: 4:22; 3:58 (single)
- Label: Ensign; Ice
- Songwriter: Eddy Grant
- Producer: Eddy Grant

Eddy Grant singles chronology
"Do You Feel My Love" (1980)	"Can't Get Enough of You" (1981)	"I Love You, Yes I Love You" (1981)

"Can't Get Enough of You" is a song written, recorded, and produced by British-Guyanese singer-songwriter Eddy Grant, released as the second single from his fourth solo studio album in 1981. The song was Grant's third UK top 15 single, and was a precursor to the more widespread success he would gain in the near future with his subsequent album, Killer on the Rampage. AllMusic's Jo-Ann Greene says of the song, "While '[Living on the] Front Line' edged toward funk, and '[Do You Feel My] Love' toward roots, "Enough" leans toward pop/rock, melded, of course, to that ever potent rhythm. A love song with punch."

The single's B-side is an edited version of "Neighbour, Neighbour", the closing track of Grant's 1977 album Message Man. The 12" version added a lengthy non-album instrumental called "Time Warp", which is a slightly reworked instrumental of the 1980 Love in Exile version of "Nobody's Got Time", a song which first appeared on his eponymous 1975 debut solo album. "Time Warp" would subsequently be released on the B-side of his later hit "Electric Avenue" in certain regions.

== Charts ==
Chart (1981)	Peak position
Germany (GfK)	22
Ireland (IRMA)	19
New Zealand (Recorded Music NZ)	26
Switzerland (Schweizer Hitparade)	12
UK Singles (OCC)	13
