= It's Our Time =

It's Our Time may refer to:

- It's Our Time, album by Four Year Strong
- "It's Our Time", song by Eddy Grant from the album Message Man
