= Time to Let Go =

Time to Let Go may refer to:

- "Time to Let Go", a song by Eddy Grant from Can't Get Enough
- "Time to Let Go", a novel by Lurlene McDaniel
