= YOP =

YOP may refer to:

- Rainbow Lake Airport, airport located adjacent to Rainbow Lake, Alberta, Canada
- Youthful Offender Program, a US program for youth offenders under 22 to be moved to lower security prisons for rehabilitation
- Youth Opportunities Programme, a UK government scheme for helping 16- to 18-year-olds into employment
- Yop, a yogurt drink by Yoplait

== See also ==
- YOPHD
