= List of number-one singles of 1982 (Ireland) =

This is a list of singles which have reached number one on the Irish Singles Chart in 1982.

Week ending	Song	Artist	Ref.
2 January	"One of Us"	ABBA	
9 January	"One of Us"	ABBA	
16 January	"One of Us"	ABBA	
23 January	"The Land of Make Believe"	Bucks Fizz	
30 January	"The Land of Make Believe"	Bucks Fizz	
6 February	"Oh Julie"	Shakin' Stevens	
13 February	"Oh Julie"	Shakin' Stevens	
20 February	"Oh Julie"	Shakin' Stevens	
27 February	"The Lion Sleeps Tonight"	Tight Fit	
6 March	"The Lion Sleeps Tonight"	Tight Fit	
13 March	"The Lion Sleeps Tonight"	Tight Fit	
20 March	"The Lion Sleeps Tonight"	Tight Fit	
27 March	"The Lion Sleeps Tonight"	Tight Fit	
3 April	"Seven Tears"	Goombay Dance Band	
10 April	"Seven Tears"	Goombay Dance Band	
17 April	"Seven Tears"	Goombay Dance Band	
24 April	"Ebony and Ivory"	Paul McCartney featuring Stevie Wonder	
1 May	"Ebony and Ivory"	Paul McCartney featuring Stevie Wonder	
8 May	"Ebony and Ivory"	Paul McCartney featuring Stevie Wonder	
15 May	"A Little Peace"	Nicole	
22 May	"A Little Peace"	Nicole	
29 May	"A Little Peace"	Nicole	
5 June	"A Little Peace"	Nicole	
12 June	"A Little Peace"	Nicole	
19 June	"House of Fun"	Madness	
26 June	"I've Never Been to Me"	Charlene	
3 July	"I've Never Been to Me"	Charlene	
10 July	"I've Never Been to Me"	Charlene	
17 July	"Happy Talk"	Captain Sensible	
24 July	"Fame"	Irene Cara	
31 July	"Fame"	Irene Cara	
7 August	"Fame"	Irene Cara	
14 August	"Come On Eileen"	Dexys Midnight Runners and the Emerald Express	
21 August	"Come On Eileen"	Dexys Midnight Runners and the Emerald Express	
28 August	"Come On Eileen"	Dexys Midnight Runners and the Emerald Express	
4 September	"Come On Eileen"	Dexys Midnight Runners and the Emerald Express	
11 September	"Eye of the Tiger"	Survivor	
18 September	"Eye of the Tiger"	Survivor	
25 September	"Eye of the Tiger"	Survivor	
2 October	"Hard to Say I'm Sorry"	Chicago	
9 October	"Hard to Say I'm Sorry"	Chicago	
16 October	"Pass the Dutchie"	Musical Youth	
23 October	"Pass the Dutchie"	Musical Youth	
30 October	"Starmaker"	The Kids from "Fame"	
6 November	"Do You Really Want to Hurt Me"	Culture Club	
13 November	"Starmaker"	The Kids from "Fame"	
20 November	"I Don't Wanna Dance"	Eddy Grant	
27 November	"I Don't Wanna Dance"	Eddy Grant	
4 December	"Mirror Man"	The Human League	
11 December	"Save Your Love"	Renée and Renato	
18 December	"Save Your Love"	Renée and Renato	
25 December	"Save Your Love"	Renée and Renato	

- 20 Number Ones
- Most weeks at No. 1 (song): "The Lion Sleeps Tonight" - Tight Fit, "A Little Peace" - Nicole (5)
- Most weeks at No. 1 (artist): Tight Fit, Nicole (5)
- Most No. 1s: all artists 1 Number One

== See also ==
- 1982 in music
- Irish Singles Chart
- List of artists who reached number one in Ireland
