= Hearts and Diamonds =

Hearts and Diamonds may refer to:

- Hearts and Diamonds (1912 film), 1912 silent film directed by Harold M. Shaw
- Hearts and Diamonds (1914 film), 1914 silent film directed by George D. Baker
- Hearts and Diamonds, 2000 album by Eddy Grant
