= Boys in the Street =

Boys in the Street may refer to:

- "Boys in the Street", song by Eddy Grant from the album Going for Broke
- "Boys in the Street", song by Greg Holden
