= Square One (band) =

1990s Barbados-based soca band

- Origin: Barbados
- Genres: Soca
- Years active: 1987-2004, 2010-present
- Labels: Ice, I-Man/Gator
- Past members: Anderson Armstrong, Cecil O'Shaka Riley, Paul Slater, George Jones, Winston Beckles Alison Hinds, Terry " Mexican" Arthur, Keann Walters and Janell Katalyst Waithe

Square One is a Bajan soca band formed in December 1987. It continued until 2004, when singer Alison Hinds left the group, then re-formed in 2010.

== History ==
Square One was formed in 1987 by Anderson "Youngblood" Armstrong (vocals), Cecil "O Shaka" Riley (vocals), Paul Slater (bass guitar), George Jones (keyboards/vocals), Winston Beckles (drums) and Terry Mexican Arthur (steel pan) . Armstrong had begun performing in local calypso competitions in 1983, and was the youngest finalist in the Pic-O-De-Crop Calypso Monarch competition. Alison Hinds joined as co-vocalist in 1987 while Square One was performing at the graduation ceremony of the Christ Church Foundation School Alison's alma mater, and the band took the name Square One that year. Their début album, Eat Drink and Be Merry, was released in 1988, and they were named 'Hotel Band of the Year' by the Musicians & Entertainers Guild of Barbados the same year, winning it again in the following two years. In 1990 they were joined by keyboardist George Washington Jones and steel panist Terry Mexican Arthur, and toured Europe for the first time. They built an international fanbase, with Hinds singing in French, Portuguese and Caribbean Patois. They were signed to Eddy Grant's Ice Records, releasing Special in 1992. Square one became the first representatives from Barbados as the Caribbean Music Awards at the Harlem Apollo in 1993. After a further album, Square Roots, they parted ways with Ice Records in 1995. Their next album 4 Sides spawned the hit single "Raggamuffin", which topped the charts in Guatemala for 49 weeks, and also Landed Alison Hinds her first Road March crown in 1996 and further hits followed with the Sweetness album and "Aye Aye Aye", "Turn it Around", "Ju Ju", and Sugar (Sweet)". Alison Hinds won the Road March competition at the Barbados Crop Over in 1997 with "In the Meantime". Their 1998 single "DJ Ride" topped St. Lucia's Radio Caribbean chart for four weeks, only knocked off the top spot by the band's next single, "Faluma". They also had a number-one hit in Barbados with "Bandit Dance", and had several hits in Trinidad and Tobago. In 1999 they won a Sunshine Award for 'Best Group Recording' ("Kitty Kat"). The band performed at the Negril Getaway festival in 2002.

Hinds left the band in 2004 after her daughter was born, having first taking a break in 2003 with Walters and Waithe taking her place, but has since enjoyed a successful solo career. Alison Hinds and her fiance Edward Walcott Junior got married on Thursday February 26 2004 and she gave birth to her daughter on May 4 of the same year Pareles.

Square One split up in 2004 but reformed in 2010, headlining the 'Soca On De Hill' festival in 2010. Anderson won the Party Monarch title in 2010 with his song "Foot On Fire".

== Discography ==
- Eat Drink and Be Merry(1988)
- Special (1992), Ice
- Square Roots (1993), Ice
- 4 Sides (1996)
- Sweetness (1997), Square One
- In Full Bloom (1998), I-Man/Gator
- Fast Forward (1999), I-Man/Gator
- Champion (2001), Square One
- Higher Heights (2001), Musicrama/Koch
- Walk of Life (2016), Showdown Records

Compilations

- Square One, A3
- Missing Files Collections (2001)

== See also ==
- Ringbang
