= Rudy Grant =

- Born: Rudolph Grant; 1950s Plaisance, British Guiana (now Guyana)
- Genres: Reggae, soca
- Occupation: Musician
- Years active: 1969–present
- Labels: Ice, Ensign, RAK

Rudolph Grant, also known as Little Brother Grant, Rudy Grant and The Mexicano, is a reggae deejay and singer.

== Biography ==
Born in Plaisance, Guyana, Grant settled in the United Kingdom with his family in 1960. His brother, Eddy Grant, was a member of The Equals in the late 1960s, and Rudolph also recorded in this era, as Little Brother Grant, releasing the single "Let's Do It Tonight". In the 1970s, he recorded as a reggae deejay under the name The Mexicano, releasing singles such as "Gorilla in Manilla", and "Cut Throat". Grant had his biggest success in 1978, with his Starsky & Hutch-inspired single "Move Up Starsky", on which he deejayed over Delroy Wilson's "I'm Still Waiting" rhythm. The single topped the UK reggae chart, with an album of the same name following it, and inspired the less successful "Move Up Hutch" by Superstar. Grant followed this with several other singles, including "Lover's Conversation", but none matched the success of "Move Up Starsky". Another 1977 single, "Every Step I Made", found a wider audience by way of inclusion in Eddy Grant's "Smash Disco Hits on ICE" compilation.

By 1981, Grant had abandoned the Mexicano alias and began recording as a singer under his own name, recording cover versions of songs including John Lennon's "Woman", and, most successfully Stevie Wonder's "Lately", with which he had a minor UK Singles Chart hit in February that year. The single's success led to a contract with Stiff Records, although he failed to score any further hits.

Grant's 1987 single "Mash in Guyana" proved a major success in his country of birth, and has been described as "the unofficial anthem of Mashramani". He wrote the song on a visit to Guyana in 1986 and recorded it at his brother Eddy's Coach House Studios on his return to London. Grant performed the song at the Notting Hill Carnival and it went on to top the first soca chart in London, published by the Black Echoes music paper.

In 2002, Grant's version of "Lately" was included on the Dynamite Reggae Classics album.

== Discography ==
=== Singles ===
==== As Little Brother Grant ====
- "Let's Do It Tonight" (1969)

==== As The Mexicano ====
- "Gorilla in Manilla"
- "Cut Throat"
- "The Mexicano v. The Dreadlocks at O.K. Corral" (1977) Serious Business
- "Every Step I Made" (1977) Ice
- "First of May" (1977) Ice
- "Move Up Starsky" (1977)
- "Lover's Conversation" (1978) Ice
- "Annie's Song" (1978) Ice
- "Treasure the Moments" (1978) Ice
- "Move Up Starsky" (1979) Ice
- "Harry the Fool"
- "Rock It"
- "Lonely Street"
- "The Israelites Can Dance Some More" (1980) Ice
- "Better Love Next Time" (1980) Ice (Jackie Robinson featuring The Mexicano)
- "Dallas" (1980) Mercury
- "Jamaican Child" (1980) Stiff Records
- "Gimme Little Loving" 1977 (Golden age records)

==== As Rudy Grant ====
- "Woman" (1981) Ice
- "Lately" (1981) Ensign UK No. 58
- "Space Oddity" (1981) Ensign/Ice
- "Funny Girl" (1982) Ice
- "Without Your Love" Ice
- "Trial by Television" Stiff
- "Everyday People" (1983) RAK
- "Get Ready Get Right" (1984) RAK
- "Mash in Guyana" (1987) Seara
- "You Got to Be Drunk" Seara
- "Melvina"
- "Jump and Play Mas" Seara

=== Albums ===
==== The Mexicano ====
- Move Up Starsky (1977) Pioneer
- Goddess of Love (1978) Ice
- The Best of The Mexicano (1980), Ice

==== Rudy Grant ====
- Sings the Hits (1982) Pinnacle
- Soca For Lovers volume 1 Seara
- Reggae and Soca for Lovers vol. 2
- Soca For Lovers Part 4 Seara
- Hello Africa Tabansi
- Peace and Love (2005) Seara
