= Water (1985 film) =

- US Theatrical release poster
- Directed by: Dick Clement
- Written by: Dick Clement; Ian La Frenais; Bill Persky
- Based on: story by Bill Persky
- Produced by: Ian La Frenais
- Starring: Michael Caine; Valerie Perrine; Brenda Vaccaro; Leonard Rossiter; Billy Connolly; Eric Clapton; George Harrison; Ringo Starr; Stefan Kalipha
- Cinematography: Douglas Slocombe
- Music by: Mike Moran; Eric Clapton; Eddy Grant; George Harrison
- Production company: HandMade Films
- Distributed by: Rank Film Distributors
- Release date: 11 January 1985
- Running time: 98 minutes
- Country: United Kingdom
- Language: English
- Box office: $1,256,862

Water is a 1985 British comedy film directed by Dick Clement and starring Michael Caine. It was scripted by Clement and Ian La Frenais. The plot spoofs elements of the comedies Carlton-Browne of the F.O. (1958) and Passport to Pimlico (1948) and the then-recent invasions of the Falkland Islands and Grenada. Caine plays Baxter Thwaites, a Governor who has 'gone native' (similar to his role in The Honorary Consul), and Billy Connolly as local biracial activist Delgado, supported by the last performance of Leonard Rossiter, as Sir Malcolm Leveridge, and one of the last performances of Fulton Mackay.

== Plot ==
The story is set in the fictional Caribbean island and British colony of Cascara. Widely ignored by the British Government, media, and general public, local Governor Baxter Thwaites is having an easy life in his small and peaceful colony. That peace is disturbed when an abandoned oil rig starts delivering water - at the standard of the finest table water brands (and laxative companies, as it contains a substance that makes you "shit like clockwork"). Different parties, including Downing Street, the Cascara Liberation Front, the White House, French bottled water producers, and Cuban guerrillas take interest in the future of the island and threaten to destroy the cosy way of life enjoyed by the island's inhabitants.

== Cast ==
- Michael Caine as Governor Baxter Thwaites
- Valerie Perrine as Pamela Weintraub
- Brenda Vaccaro as Dolores Thwaites
- Leonard Rossiter as Sir Malcolm Leveridge (final film appearance, released posthumously)
- Billy Connolly as Delgado Fitzhugh
- Chris Tummings as Garfield Cooper
- Dennis Dugan as Rob Waring
- Fulton Mackay as Reverend Eric McNab
- Jimmie Walker as Jay "Jay-Jay"
- Dick Shawn as Deke Halliday
- Fred Gwynne as Franklin Spender
- Trevor Laird as Pepito
- Alan Igbon as Cuban
- Maureen Lipman as Margaret Thatcher
- Alfred Molina as Pierre
- Bill Persky as TV Director
- Ruby Wax as Spenco Executive
- Eric Clapton as himself
- George Harrison as himself
- Ringo Starr as himself
- Chris Stainton as himself
- Jon Lord as himself
- Ray Cooper as himself
- Michael Moran as himself
- Stefan Kalipha as Cuban #1

== Production ==
=== Development ===
The film was one of three movies that HandMade Films intended to shoot in 1984, the others being A Private Function and a comedy from John MacKenzie, The Travelling Man (which ultimately would not be made). It was written by the experienced comedy duo Ian La Frenais and Dick Clement, who had just made Bullshot (1983) for HandMade. "I guess it was like an Ealing film," said Clement, "but it was not a conscious effort to recreate that style. I can see the analogies with something like Passport to Pimlico."

=== Writing ===
Le Frenais and Clement had made a television pilot in the US with Bill Persky who came up with the idea of a fictional British colony in the Caribbean which sought independence. The three of them wrote a screenplay which Persky wanted to direct (he had made the film Serial (1980)) but they were unable to raise finance. Then when Clement and Le Frenais made Bullshot for Handmade they showed the script to Denis O'Brien, head of the studio. "It was Denis who absolutely loved the script and really responded to it and said, 'Let's do it'," said Clement. The fictional island of Cascara, which was the Caribbean island of Saint Lucia, is a play on Cascara, a plant which has laxative properties because in the film a re-opened oil well is discovered to produce mineral water with a 'slight laxative effect'. After Clement and Le Frenais wrote another draft of the script, they sent it to Michael Caine, who loved it and wanted to be in the film. Clement says, "We were thrilled because we knew that meant we would get the film made, and suddenly it was a go project."

=== Casting ===
Denis O'Brien liked to use members of Monty Python in HandMade films and offered the role of Sir Malcolm Leveridge to John Cleese. Cleese read the script and turned it down; Leonard Rossiter played the role instead, in what turned out to be Rossiter's last film.

At the time Billy Connolly was an emerging comedian, much admired by Denis O'Brien. "They were always trying to put him into a movie because Denis was convinced that Billy Connolly was the funniest man in Britain," said Clement. "He was way ahead of the pack there." O'Brien insisted that Connolly be in Bullshot and Water. "He was actually cast before anybody else," said Clement.

O'Brien offered the lead role of Baxter to Michael Palin who turned it down. Palin wrote in his diary about the script, "First 16 pages are wonderfully funny, but it all falls apart and there isn’t a laugh after that. No characters are developed, new characters are thrust in instead and the jokes become stretched and laboured." Clement called Palin, who called the director "intelligent and tactful and is, after all, a TV writer with an impressive record — Likely Lads, etc. We can understand each other’s language. He professes his liking for naturalistic comedy, and yet sees Water as an international film. I tell him that I think ‘international’ comedy a very dangerous concept." Palin also felt the casting of Connolly "to play the black revolutionary a real commercial cop out... 'Well, he'll be sort of brown,' Dick reassures."

O'Brien tried to persuade Palin to change his mind but two months later Palin wrote in his diary, "having re-read the script I know it’s going to be only a slightly more exciting version of Yellowbeard and Bullshot." Palin made A Private Function instead. Michael Caine played the lead role.

Billy Connolly later recalled the making of the movie. "We went to Heathrow to fly out, and fly out we did. Not knowing that - there were no mobile phones then of course - they were racing up to tell us not to go. That the money had fallen through. But by the time the plane landed in Saint Lucia, they'd got the money again!"

The television presenter Paul Heiney played a small role in the film for an episode for the BBC series In at the Deep End.

=== Filming ===
The movie started filming in May 1984. The same month A Private Function also went into production and people who worked on that film felt their budget was sacrificed in order to fund Water.

Shooting took place mostly on Saint Lucia. There were few filmmaking facilities so items had to be shipped there by sea. Studio work was done at Shepperton Studios in London and the oil rig scenes were shot in Devon.

Dick Clement later said, "We were rewriting the ending as we went along and that's never good... In hindsight, I always think you need to get those decisions out of the way before you get on the set. But, on the whole, it was a good shoot. Michael Caine was a fantastic trouper on the film, he was really a joy to work with, enormously supportive. I can’t be more appreciative of his work on it and how professional he was. In a way, Michael had the straightest part in the film, he was almost the straight man. He kept saying to me, 'You realise I'm having to carry all the plot here?'"

Connolly said Caine "taught me so much, about how to be generous to other actors. We were climbing up a hill and we were being filmed from the top. Suddenly he went, oh! My leg! And he spoiled a whole take. So they said we're doing it again, and he whispered to me 'next time, move further to the right, they can't see you'. He was lovely."

George Harrison normally did not get too involved in production of HandMade's films. However, he helped out on Water by appearing in the concert at the end and getting his friends Eric Clapton, Ringo Starr, Jon Lord and Ray Cooper to appear. "George was very leery of appearing in his own company's movies," says Clement, "that was a big help to the film. We called in a few favours and, obviously, the Harrison connection didn't hurt. We hoped that scene would be a big selling tool for the movie... didn't work out that way but it was a good idea."

The concert scene was shot in a single day at Shepperton Studios. Clapton, Starr and Harrison were paid the musician's minimum rate for a playback session on set.

== Soundtrack ==
The soundtrack principally featured reggae music by Eddy Grant and was released by Ariston Records.

Side 1
No.	Title	Writer(s)	Artist	Length
1.	"Water"	Eddy Grant	Eddy Grant	3:56
2.	"Walking on Sunshine"	Eddy Grant	Eddy Grant	3:50
3.	"All As One"	Ian La Frenais, Mike Moran	Lance Ellington	3:50
4.	"The Cascaran National Anthem"	Bill Persky, Dick Clement, Ian La Frenais, Mike Moran		0:59
5.	"Instrumental"	Mighty Gabby	Mighty Gabby	2:55
6.	"Focus of Attention"	Dick Clement, George Harrison, Mike Moran	Jimmy Helms	2:10

Side 2
No.	Title	Writer(s)	Artist	Length
1.	"Living on the Frontline"	Eddy Grant	Eddy Grant	3:40
2.	"Cascara"	Mike Moran	Lance Ellington	3:48
3.	"Jack"	Mighty Gabby	Mighty Gabby	4:45
4.	"Celebration"	George Harrison, Mike Moran	Jimmy Helms	3:46
5.	"Freedom"	Eric Clapton, Ian La Frenais	Billy Connolly, Chris Tummings, The Singing Rebel's Band	4:40
6.	"Water (Instrumental)"	Eddy Grant	Eddy Grant	2:18

The Singing Rebel's Band consists of Eric Clapton, George Harrison, Ray Cooper, Jon Lord, Mike Moran, Chris Stainton and Ringo Starr, with backing singers Jenny Bogle and Anastasia Rodriguez. It spoofs The Concert for Bangladesh organised by Harrison in 1971.

== Release ==
The film premiered in London in January 1985. It was briefly in the top ten box office listing - along with A Private Function - but soon dropped out. It failed to recoup its costs and could not find an American distributor. When it was released there in April 1986 it failed at the box office there too.

=== Reception ===
The film received a mixed review in the New York Times, which read in part "The folks who packaged this put-on operated on the theory that a lot of eccentric people doing nutty things produce hilarity. The ingredient missing from the fitfully amusing conglomeration of characters is a character for the whole. In kidding everything, the movie leaves us uncertain about whether anything is being seriously kidded."

The Los Angeles Times called it "so refreshingly funny that you're tempted to forgive its tendency to run dry in its last half-hour... boasts some of the wittiest lines heard on screen since A Private Function."

Rob Salem of the Toronto Star described Water as "an eccentric delight from beginning to end, a perfect combination of casting and script ... completely irresistible."

Dick Clement later reflected:

I'm happier with Bullshot than I am with Water. I think Water just misses. I feel it's not quite connecting in the right way. I look back on it and I'm fairly uncomfortable. For me I always did have a problem with fictional countries or places, I always like things rooted a little bit more in reality. I have a feeling that kind of thing works perhaps in fiction, but I always find that film is a very literal medium, you've got to sell stuff on the screen and I think it was larger than life in a way that isn't quite comfortable on screen and I don't think I pulled it off... And again in hindsight as much as I love Billy Connolly I think a black guy in that part would have been better. I think that would've helped the credibility of making it a Caribbean island.

Michael Palin later said the financial failure of the film "was a bit of a turning point in HandMade Films, that Water was such a disaster and yet so much money was put into it. Somehow the luck ran out because judgement up to that time had been pretty good."

Filmink wrote "In most accounts of Handmade Films... Water is a sort of bastard stepchild. It’s been called the film that marked a turning point in the company, a project which cost too much, a movie no one liked, which wasted a George Harrison and Ringo Starr cameo, that’s been criticised by its own makers, Dick Clement and Ian Le Frenais, as well as those involved in Handmade’s A Private Function (1984), who whinged that their budget was cut to pay for Water; cuddly Leonard Maltin gave it a ‘BOMB' rating. We actually really like Water. Maybe we’re the only people who do, but we think that it’s funny, charming, full of great gags and performances, and has a satisfying ending." The magazine noted the film was the first in a series of unsuccessful comedies set in the Caribbean, others including Club Paradise and The Last Resort.

=== Home media ===
Water was first released on home video by Paramount Home Video on 1 February 1987. The film received its first DVD edition in North America in 2006, courtesy of Anchor Bay Entertainment.

== Notes ==
- Palin, Michael (2014). Halfway to Hollywood : diaries 1980-1988. Phoenix.
- Sellers, Robert (2003). Always Look on the Bright Side of Life: The Inside Story of HandMade Films. John Blake.
