= Guyanese in the United Kingdom =

Guyanese people in the United Kingdom
Total population
- 20,872 Guyanese-born (2001 Census); 21,417 Guyanese-born (2011 Census)

Regions with significant populations
- London, Birmingham, Manchester

Languages
- English (British English, Guyanese Creole), Guyanese Hindustani, Akawaio, Macushi, Wai-Wai, Arawakan, Cariban

Religion
- Hinduism, Pentecostalism, Roman Catholic, Islam, Anglicanism

Related ethnic groups
- Guyanese people, British African-Caribbean community, British Indo-Caribbean community, Black British, Black African, Multiracial, Indo-Caribbean, Indo-Guyanese, Amerindian, British Indians, British Chinese
- * Please note that in 2001 only 40.4% of Afro-Caribbeans in the UK were actually born in the Caribbean, 59.6% were born elsewhere (of which 57.9% of the total ethnic groups population was born in the UK)

Citizens or residents of the United Kingdom whose origins lie in Guyana are a part of the country's British Caribbean community. Guyana was a former British colony, British Guiana, responsible for moving large numbers of Africans and Indians for labour in the sugar industry. British Guyanese are notable for their contributions to literature and music.

== Demographics ==
=== Population ===
At the time of the 2001 UK Census there were 20,872 Guyanese-born people in the UK. In 2001, Guyana was the sixth most common birthplace within the Americas for people in the UK and on a global scale ranked as the 51st most common birthplace of people resident in the UK. Estimates published by the Office for National Statistics suggest that the Guyanese-born population of the UK was 24,000 in 2009.

== Culture and community ==
=== Literature ===
Guyanese immigrants have had an influence on recent literature in the UK, and significant numbers of writers and poets have made their footprint on current British culture and have become everyday household names. It is, however, claimed that this trend of success in the field has not continued through to the second- and third-generation Guyanese Britons. The late Beryl Gilroy was a significant figure within the Afro-Caribbean diaspora in the UK. This highly respected Guyanese-born novelist became the first black headteacher of any school in the country. Another important literary figure of the Guyanese British community in the UK as a whole is John Agard, who is probably the most famous Black British poet and has been recognised with many awards. Pauline Melville's output of work has led to such awards as Guardian Fiction Prize, the Macmillan Silver Pen Award and the Commonwealth Writers' Prize for best first book. Wilson Harris, who received the first ever Guyana Prize for Literature, has like many other Guyanese writers in the UK has been heavily influenced and inspired by the culture and history of his homeland. Indo-Guyanese writer David Dabydeen, a UK resident, has interests that encompass the slave-trading history of Guyana as well as contemporary Caribbean culture in the UK.

The pioneering black publishing company Bogle-L'Ouverture was founded in London in the late 1960s by Jessica Huntley and Eric Huntley from Guyana, their first publication being Walter Rodney's The Groundings with My Brothers (1969).

=== Music ===
The music of Guyana is a mix of African, Indian, European and native elements. It is similar to the music of various other Caribbean nations, where reggae, soca and calypso prove the most popular. These forms of music have worked their way into British life by the Guyanese community of the UK and even by several famous Guyanese musicians who have migrated to the UK. The influence of Caribbean music in the United Kingdom is evident in many walks of life; the work of many contemporary artists is based in the reggae and calypso styles. Eddy Grant, a Guyanese-born immigrant to the UK, helped popularise such genres as reggae through his global hits such as "Electric Avenue" and "I Don't Wanna Dance". Reggae has proven the most successful sub-category of Guyanese music (and Caribbean music in general) in the UK and Grant himself is noted as saying: "in my heart, I know that Soca and Ringbang have the same potential as reggae to achieve great popularity… but there has never been any proper commitment to marketing these artists and their music. We are not Sony, and the artists on board realise it will take time. It is an upliftment process." Another Guyanese-born musician who developed a successful musical careers in Great Britain is Mad Professor (Neil Fraser). Fraser established Ariwa Records in the 1980s and became a central figure in the UK dub scene as a prolific producer of dub, reggae and an originator of the "Lovers Rock" genre.

As the Guyanese community in the UK has advanced into its second and third generations, evidence of traditional Guyanese elements in the music has begun to decrease. British-born individuals of Guyanese origin have in particular become more mainstream and modernised. The most recent success story of a British singer of Guyanese origin is Leona Lewis, the Londoner whose music is largely pop and R&B won series three of the talent contest The X Factor. She has attained three number one hits in the UK and it the only solo British female in over two decades to have reached the top spot on the Billboard Hot 100. Another example of a successful British-Guyanese artists is Wretch 32, a rapper from Tottenham, London who has led on to release 4 UK top 10 singles, a number 1 single and an album which topped the UK R&B chart selling nearly 25,000 copies in its first week. Haring Traditional Guyanese acts and British acts influenced by such genres as reggae, soca and calypso can be found in festivals across the country, the most famous being the Notting Hill Carnival (the world's second largest street festival).

== See also ==
- Black British
- British Mixed
- British African-Caribbean community
- British Indo-Caribbean community
- Guyanese Canadians
- Demographics of Guyana
- British Chinese
