= Gimme Hope Jo'anna =

1989 single by Eddy Grant

Single by Eddy Grant

from the album File Under Rock
- B-side: "Say Hello to Fidel"
- Released: 11 January 1988
- Recorded: Blue Wave (Saint Philip, Barbados)
- Genre: Worldbeat
- Length: 4:04
- Label: Parlophone, EMI
- Songwriter: Eddy Grant
- Producer: Eddy Grant

Eddy Grant singles chronology
"Dance Party" (1986)	"Gimme Hope Jo'anna" (1988)	"Harmless Piece of Fun" (1988)

Music video
- "Gimme Hope Jo'anna" on YouTube

Professional ratings
Review scores
Source	Rating
Number One	3/5 stars

"Gimme Hope Jo'anna" is an anti-apartheid song written and originally released by Guyanese-British singer, songwriter and multi-instrumentalist Eddy Grant on 11 January 1988, during the apartheid era in South Africa. The song was banned by the South African government when it was released, but was widely played there nonetheless. It reached No. 7 on the UK Singles Chart, becoming Grant's first British top 10 hit for five years.

== Background ==
Eddy Grant is a Guyanese-British singer. He had chart hits in the 1980s, his most recent one prior to this single in 1984. "Gimme Hope Jo'anna" was targeted at the South African apartheid National Party government and apartheid culture after Grant had visited Africa. It included several references to South African culture. The song ends on an optimistic note of hope that the apartheid system would end soon, which it ultimately did in 1991. The song was Grant's first release in over a year.

== Lyrics ==
While the lyrics are worded as though the singer is addressing an individual, the titular "Jo'anna" is actually a metaphor for the South African apartheid administration, personified through the city of Johannesburg. The lyrics mention Durban, Transvaal, and Soweto. "The preacher who works for Jesus, the Archbishop who's a peaceful man" is a reference to the Anglican Archbishop of Cape Town Desmond Tutu, who received the 1984 Nobel Peace Prize for his fight against apartheid. and was declared as the "national anthem of Mitchells Plain". It expressed hope for change in South Africa.

== Reception ==
"Gimme Hope Jo'anna" gained international attention and charted at No. 7 in the UK Singles Charts and at No. 1 in a number of European countries. It did not chart in the United States. It gained widespread popularity in the United Kingdom. The National Party government banned the song in South Africa upon release.

Bill Coleman from Billboard described the song as "sprightly pop with a meaningful anti-apartheid message". Kate Davies from Number One noted that here, "he's taken the exquisite flavour of southern African music and shaped it into a bouncy song which no one will be able to hear without singing along to. Listen carefully to the lyrics—thought provoking stuff." Its inclusion on Grant's 1990 album, Barefoot Soldier, was considered by Pensacola News Journal as a good song on a "pedestrian" album. Roger Morton from Record Mirror wrote, "Eddy is still proving that he's got balls by re-entering the pop fray with an anti-apartheid single ('Jo'Anna' as in Johannesburg) which will no doubt be considered 'too political' by radio. Seek it out then, for as well as being right-on-brother it's a grinning piece of Afro-dance blessed as ever with Sir Edmond's infectious pop touch." The song was Grant's last major hit to date.

It was sung at an African National Congress (ANC) rally at Green Point Stadium in Cape Town before the 1994 South African general election, despite the ANC DJ attempting to get people to sing other peace hymns. The National Party used it during their campaign for the 1994 South African general election, despite having previously banned it. In 2008 Grant was invited to perform the song at the Nelson Mandela 90th Birthday Tribute, held in Hyde Park, London, Grant's first live stage performance for twenty years. He said that though the lyrics were outdated for their original meaning, they were still relevant due to cases of black South Africans attacking black Zimbabwean immigrants in the Alexandra township. Later in the year, he was invited to perform the song in Hindi for the final of the Indian Premier League cricket tournament. In 2021, Grant said that "Gimme Hope Jo'anna" was the song he was the most proud of due to its widespread recognition and that people understood what it was about. A reviewer in The Age said the song was "possibly the most appealing anti-apartheid song since The Special AKA's "Free Nelson Mandela". On release, The Guardian said it "promises moderately well" and that "it's not quite Electric Avenue", Grant's earlier release, "but he can still bash out a good tune".

== Later adaptions ==
In 2004, McCann-Erickson adopted a version of "Gimme Hope Jo'anna" as an advertising jingle for Yoplait's Yop yoghurt drink in the United Kingdom, adapted to "Gimme Yop, Me Mama", sung with Jamaican accents. There was criticism for Grant allowing his song to be used in such a way, with The Telegraph saying it had been "bastardised". The Guardian stated they felt some might find it inappropriate that an anti-apartheid anthem had been appropriated to sell yoghurts but acknowledged the main reason for the song was no longer relevant. One reporter theorized that Grant may have used the money from the campaign to help bolster his ongoing mentorship of Caribbean musicians under his record label Ice Records. Grant stated in 2018 it was easier to gain money from advertising than from record sales in modern times. The company later used the same advert in Canada.

The song was adopted by fans of the Wales national football team as a football chant, for their midfielder Joe Allen, titled "Give Me Hope Joe Allen", during their UEFA Euro 2016 campaign. In 2017, the British tabloid newspaper The Sun adapted the lyrics of the song into "Give Us Hope Johanna", to support the British tennis player Johanna Konta at Wimbledon and encouraged people to sing the new lyrics. The Namibian Sun also did the same for the Namibian Paralympic athlete Johanna Benson in 2020, in preparation for the 2020 Summer Paralympics, which were later postponed.

== Track listings ==
- 7-inch single
1. "Gimme Hope Jo'Anna" – 3:47
2. "Say Hello to Fidel" – 4:41
- 12-inch maxi
1. "Gimme Hope Jo'Anna"
2. "Say Hello to Fidel"
3. "Living on the Frontline" (live version)

== Charts ==
=== Weekly charts ===
Chart (1988)	Peak position
Australia (Australian Music Report)	81
Austria (Ö3 Austria Top 40)	2
Belgium (Ultratop 50 Flanders)	1
Denmark (IFPI)	14
Europe (Eurochart Hot 100)	8
Europe (European Airplay Top 50)	2
Finland (Suomen virallinen lista)	5
France (SNEP)	8
Italy (Musica e dischi)	1
Italy Airplay (Music & Media)	4
Netherlands (Dutch Top 40)	1
Netherlands (Single Top 100)	1
New Zealand (Recorded Music NZ)	3
Spain (AFYVE)	1
Sweden (Sverigetopplistan)	8
Switzerland (Schweizer Hitparade)	2
UK Singles (Official Charts)	7
West Germany (GfK)	4
Zimbabwe (ZIMA)	1

=== Year-end charts ===
Chart (1988)	Position
Austria (Ö3 Austria Top 40)	20
Belgium (Ultratop)	5
Europe (Eurochart Hot 100)	9
Europe (European Airplay Top 50)	1
France (SNEP)	50
Netherlands (Dutch Top 40)	10
Netherlands (Single Top 100)	4
New Zealand (RIANZ)	14
Switzerland (Schweizer Hitparade)	2
UK Singles (OCC)	67
West Germany (Media Control)	14

== Certifications ==
Region	Certification	Certified units/sales
France (SNEP)	Silver	250,000^{*}
^{*} Sales figures based on certification alone.
