= Plaisance (album) =

Studio album by Eddy Grant
- Released: September 15, 2017
- Genre: Reggae, pop
- Length: 63:00
- Label: Greenheart Music
- Producer: Eddy Grant

Eddy Grant chronology
Reparation (2006)	Plaisance (2017)

Plaisance is an album by musician Eddy Grant. The title of this album is a reference to the town of Plaisance, Guyana, where Eddy Grant was born in 1948.

== Track listing ==
1. "Down the Road Again" – 4:33
2. "I'm the One" – 3:15
3. "Key to Your Heart" – 3:46
4. "Now We're All Together" – 3:22
5. "Mind the Gap" – 5:38
6. "Heroes on the Run" – 4:16
7. "Up Against the Wall" – 4:08
8. "Real Black and Blue" – 5:28
9. "True to You" – 3:37
10. "Shak-Shak" – 7:54
11. "Is Carol King Here" – 5:41
12. "Let's Get Started" – 4:22
13. "The Perfect One" – 3:15
14. "I Belong to You" - 4:29
