= British Homophone =

Record pressing company

British Homophone was a record company, based in Great Britain that operated between 1921 and 1985. Incorporated on 3 August 1921 as a private company, it originally owned the label Homochord, and the respective company called The British Homochord Co., Ltd, which had its roots in The Homophone Disc Record Co. established in 1908 by Bernhard Andres & Co. on behalf of Homophone Company GmbH, and operated until 1917. Around 1935, the company was purchased by Crystalate.

British Homophone pressed some of the early Island Records releases around 1962, and the name British Homophone continued to be used until 1985.

== History ==
On 3 August 1921 British Homophone became an incorporated company.

In May 1928, British Homophone is announced as a public limited company with a share capital of £150k and subsequently purchased assets from William Sternberg's Sterno Manufacturing Company, which included the label Sterno. The acquisition was bolstered in November of the same year by the takeover of Gramophone Records Ltd., founded in March 1928, including a recording studio in Kilburn.

In January 1929, the former Pathe Frères Pathephone Ltd. factory in Stonebridge was purchased from Columbia Graphophone by British Homophone. This factory was notable as one of the first companies in Britain to process and press vinyl records for both their own labels (Homochord and Sterno) as well as for independent labels and customers. During the 1930s, British Homophone received recordings sent from the British Broadcasting Corporation's Maida Vale Studios via telephone line, which were then recorded onto wax discs overnight for programme repeats. This practice preceded the use of acetates, which only emerged in the mid-1930s. The company found itself in a challenging financial situation throughout the 1930s due to falling share prices and low record sales, despite setting up new labels and record formats and slashing record prices. Consequently, the firm's head office was moved from central London to a site on Barry Road in 1931.

In 1935 the company was purchased by Crystalate, which in turn was later purchased by The Decca Record Company Limited in 1937 for £200,000.

In May 1937, British Homophone signed over their Sterno label in an agreement with Decca and Electric & Musical Industries Ltd. As part of the agreement, British Homophone was to cease producing records for sale to the public over the course of the following 20 years. As a result, British Phonograph Records Ltd., a joint venture between the Decca and EMI, took possession of all metal matrices, copyrights, trademarks, designs and finished records. British Homophone shifted its focus solely to non-public recording business.

Between 1938 and 1939, the organisation was under the charge of Crystalate Ltd., the proprietor of The Crystalate Gramophone Record Manufacturing Co. Ltd.. By 1939, the production sites located in Kilburn and Stonebridge were closed and moved to a newly refurbished site at New Cross. At the new site, British Homophone primarily specialised in pressing records for independent record labels such as Chris Blackwell's Island Records and R&B Discs Ltd.

In 1971, President Records Executive Edward Kassner, a refugee from Nazi Austria, purchased a 50% stake in British Homophone. This allowed the company to expand and modernise its facilities. However, by the late 1970s, the company had suffered bankruptcy, leading to the plant falling into a dilapidated state. Peter Newbrook, in a 1996 interview, recalled that the plant's condition was heartbreaking, noting the admittedly great potential it could have had.

In 1979, Eddy Grant, long-time associate of President Record through his band known as the Equals, obtained control of the record manufacturing plant, which was believed to be part of a tax settlement. This plant, operating as Ice Records, was the first black-owned record plant in Europe. It was primarily used to press records for Grant's ICE record label, in addition to overruns from a major label from Kassner's tenure of the business. Despite Grant's ownership and endeavours, the facility failed to maintain its quality, and in 1985 the company closed.
