= Love in Exile (Eddy Grant album) =

Studio album by Eddy Grant
- Released: 30 May 1980
- Studios: Coach House Recording Studios, Stamford Hill
- Genre: Reggae
- Length: 47:14
- Labels: Ice; Epic
- Producer: Eddy Grant

Eddy Grant chronology
Walking on Sunshine (1978)	Love in Exile (1980)	Can't Get Enough (1981)

Alternative cover
- US cover, retitled My Turn to Love You

Singles from Love in Exile
- 1. "My Turn to Love You" / "Use It or Lose It" Released: 16 May 1980; 2. "Everybody Dance" / "Feel the Rhythm (of You and I)" Released: 1980 (US only)

Love in Exile (Note: Renamed to My Turn to Love You in the US and select other countries) is the fourth studio album by British-Guyanese singer-songwriter Eddy Grant. Its performance was not as desirable as its predecessor, Walking on Sunshine, which amassed a cult following in Africa and the UK following the success of "Say I Love You" and "Living on the Frontline." Its only single was a double A-side of "My Turn to Love You" and "Use It or Lose It," though this marketing was mostly used in the UK, with other countries favoring "My Turn to Love You." The single was released on 16 May and became a hit in the Netherlands, charting at No. 18.

== US release ==
Grant had previously signed with Epic Records to release his music in the US, having already done so with his previous album. This album would prove to be the last of Grant's Epic would distribute, releasing in June 1980. The art direction underwent a major revision, with the cover art showing a white-clad Grant standing next to a piano, and the back showing only one picture of him playing guitar, rather than the on-stage photo on the front and two guitar-playing pictures on the back, respectively. The album also sported a new name — My Turn to Love You. Along with the new title track, Epic also issued the single "Everybody Dance" / "Feel the Rhythm," which also failed to chart.

== Reception ==
Professional ratings
Review scores
Source	Rating
AllMusic	2/5 stars

Billboard said the record consists mostly of "slick r&b", calling "Preachin' Genocide," "Exiled," and "Everybody Dance" the best cuts. Record World favored the LP, giving positive feedback to "Use It or Lose It" and "Feel the Rhythm." Record Mirror, however, was critical of "My Turn to Love You," remarking that "this single enters one ear and flows out of the other without tickling whatever grey matter there is in between."

== Track listing ==
All tracks are written by Eddy Grant.

Side one
No.	Title	Length
1.	"My Turn to Love You"	4:33
2.	"Feel the Rhythm (of You and I)"	6:11
3.	"Use It or Lose It"	3:54
4.	"Nobody's Got Time"	7:24

Side two
No.	Title	Length
5.	"Preachin' Genocide"	6:48
6.	"Exiled (from the Love I Know)"	9:35
7.	"Everybody Dance"	6:29
Total length:		47:14

== Personnel ==
Personnel is listed in order of first appearance in the liner notes.

Adapted from the liner notes from the original LP and the 1992 CD reissue:

Musicians

- Eddy Grant - horn arrangements (track 1), all instruments and vocals except:
- Winston Henry - bass (track 1)
- Marcus James - guitar (track 1)
- Pamela Robertin, Rose Hibbert, Sandra Maeyers - backing vocals (tracks 1-2)
- The Coach House Horn Section - horns (tracks 1-2, 5)
- The Coach House String Section - strings (tracks 1-3, 6)
- Ken Goodman - horn arrangements (tracks 1-2), string arrangements (tracks 1-2)
- Sonny Akpan - congas (tracks 1-2, 5)
- Cecil "Jimmy" Haynes - bass (track 2)
- Peter Nelson - electric piano (track 2)
- Len Meade - bass (track 3)
- Tony "Zap" Edmonds - electric piano (track 3)
- Tony King - string arrangements (tracks 3, 6)
- Ron Telemacque - drums (track 4)
- Bill Summers - congas (track 5)
- Herschell Holder, Noel Norris, Pat Daniels - horns (track 5)
- Gaspa Lawal - congas (track 6)
- Liza Strike, Ruby James, Sylvie Mason-James - backing vocals (track 6)
- Kofi Ayivor - congas (track 7)
- Lloyd "T-Charm" Charmers, Marcus James, Ron Telemacque, Hughes "T-Zap" Edmonds - handclaps (all tracks)

Technical

- Eddy Grant - production, engineering
- Pete Walters, Ron Telemacque, Steven Aaron - engineering
- Patrick Grant - assistant engineer
- Gary Merrin - photography (front)
- Winston Carbon - photography (back)
- Herb Schmitz - photography (US front)
