= Grynner =

Barbadian calypsonian

Grynner (born MacDonald Blenman on 10 February 1946), is a popular calypsonian from Barbados. Like his compatriot Mighty Gabby, his songs often feature political and social commentary. He has been named the Barbados Crop Over Road March "Tune of the Crop" winner seven times (1983–85, 1988–90, and 1998, he was supposed to win Road March nine times but he had to settle for third in both 1996 and 1997)

== See also ==
- Ice Records
- Ringbang
