= Reparation (album) =

Studio album by Eddy Grant
- Released: April 18, 2006
- Genre: Reggae, funk, soca, rock, ringbang
- Length: 55:35
- Label: Greenheart Music
- Producer: Eddy Grant

Eddy Grant chronology
The Greatest Hits (2001)	Reparation (2006)	Plaisance (2017)

Professional ratings
Review scores
Source	Rating
Allmusic	4/5 stars

Reparation is an album by musician Eddy Grant. The title of this album is a call for restitution for the transatlantic slave trade.

== Track listing ==
1. "Concern Number One" – 4:14
2. "Everything Irie" – 3:56
3. "Everybody Rappin'" – 3:33
4. "(Gotta Be) Positive" – 3:40
5. "The Struggle" – 4:10
6. "Reparation" – 4:26
7. "Ringbang Man" – 4:03
8. "Tit for Tat" – 4:45
9. "Long Night" – 4:35
10. "Going Back Deh" – 4:33
11. "Love Weself" – 4:25
12. "Free My Soul" – 4:05
13. "Jesus Got a Face" – 5:10
