= Walking on Sunshine (Eddy Grant album) =

Studio album by Eddy Grant
- Released: 1978
- Studios: The Coach House Recording Studio, Stamford Hill, London
- Genres: Caribbean music; reggae; dance; calypso; soul
- Length: 41:53
- Labels: Ice; Epic
- Producer: Eddy Grant

Eddy Grant chronology
Message Man (1977)	Walking on Sunshine (1978)	Love in Exile (1980)

Singles from Walking on Sunshine
- 1. "Say I Love You" Released: 14 July 1978; 2. "Walking on Sunshine" Released: 16 March 1979; 3. "Living on the Frontline" Released: 11 May 1979

Walking on Sunshine is the third studio album by Guyanese-British musician Eddy Grant, originally released in 1978 by Ice Records. Recorded at Grant's Stamford Hill recording studio, the album was the follow-up to Message Man (1977) and fuses styles of Caribbean music like reggae, soca and calypso with other genres, including funk and pop. The musician played most of the album's instrumentation himself, and described the record as reflecting his joyousness. However, some songs feature tough cultural themes, particularly those on the first side.

The album was only originally released in Africa and the Caribbean, markets Grant was popular in since his British success had dwindled in the years before, and proved particularly successful in Nigeria. However, the Nigerian government banned exported records during the album's high sales peak, leaving Grant with 10,000-20,000 further copies he was unable to send. Thus, he and his brother sold the remaining copies to British retailers and discos, especially those in London. Nightclub disc jockeys began playing the song "Living on the Frontline" and the song gradually rose in popularity among British discos, leading to a one-off distribution deal with Ensign Records to release it commercially, and it reached number 11 on the UK Singles Chart. Unsold copies of the album were bought back from shops by Grant's brother for a major album relaunch.

Now distributing with Virgin Records in Britain and Epic Records in the United States, Ice released Walking on Sunshine anew in major markets on 1 October 1979. The title track was chosen as the next single but was commercially unsuccessful, as was the album itself. Critics generally complimented the album's genre fusions and uplifting sound. In 1989, the title track was re-released to promote Walking on Sunshine - The Very Best of Eddy Grant and reached number 63 in the UK, while in 2008, a deluxe edition of Walking on Sunshine was released by Ice and Universal Records.

== Background and recording ==
After leaving the Equals in 1971–72, Eddy Grant prioritised his productions of other artists, which he released through his own label Ice Records, and recorded the solo albums Eddy Grant (1975), which was only released in Britain and Trinidad and Tobago, and Message Man (1977), on which he began creating his own reggae style, and explored what soon became soca music. Contrary to Grant's earlier success with the Equals, he was by this point unpublicised in the British press and ignored by the British music industry, ensuring the album was a commercial failure in his home country. However, he found success in other countries, most notably in Africa and the Caribbean, and the album achieved a Gold certification in Nigeria. Grant explained of his overseas successes in 1978: "I'm not like all the other guys who have small record companies – not to decry them, but I think I can be of more assistance to more people by aiming at an international market."

Grant recorded Walking on Sunshine in Coach House Recording Studios, Stamford Hill, London, a popular studio with Black British musicians which the musician built in 1973 and recently expanded to include a 24-track recorder. Unlike Message Man, Grant played almost all the instruments himself, excluding congas, which were played by Kofi Ayivor and Sonny Akpan, and drums on two songs by Conrad Isedore. Aside from Frank Aggarat's engineering work on "Say I Love You So", Grant engineered the rest of the album himself, in addition to producing it. Aggart had left the sessions to depart for Iran, and Grant would describe the rest of the sessions as a "test" for himself. Considering his albums to be "experiments", he found the degree of experimentation on Walking on Sunshine "to be total. It felt like I was able to give flight to an idea, regardless of the end result, whether it was commercial or not." Having found the album's tracks to be "a group of recordings that just came together", the musician felt no need to record potential extra songs for inclusion.

Since building Coach House, Grant had regularly worked with tape loops due to a shortage of drum machines, and would typically set these up before adding drums and other instruments. This approach is particularly exemplified with "Living on the Frontline", in which "the loop was set forever", as he later explained: "I did a little bit of the of song to make people comfortable but, in my mind, I could hear the synthesisers that no one liked at the time. Everyone was asking 'Is that the bass or a synthesiser?' It kind of got on my tits. You either like it or you don't." The musician decided to draw the song out and create "The Frontline Symphony." Ian Shirley of Record Collector wrote that Grant was "ahead of the curve" by using synths and loops and "playing everything". When the album was mixed at Morgan Studios, Willesden, Grant became aware of the music's bright, crisp top end, finding this to be a welcome change from his earlier solo works, further reminding him of George McRae's 1974 hit "Rock Your Baby". In this period, Grant also recorded a comeback album by the Equals for Ice, Mystic Syster (1978).

== Composition ==
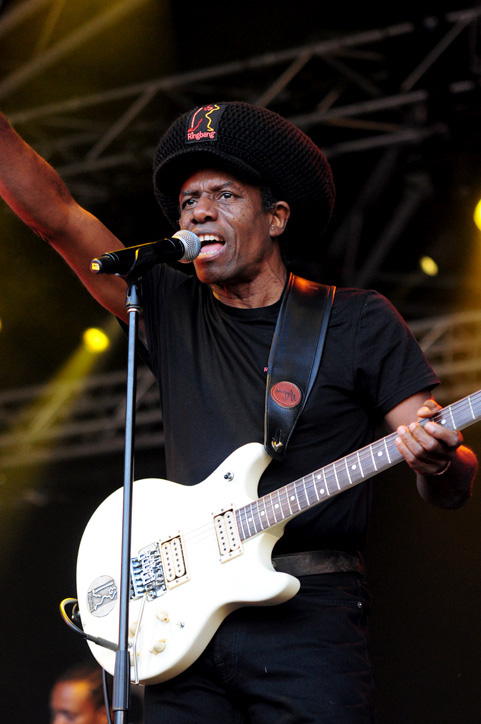
Eddy Grant (pictured 2009) wrote Walking on Sunshine as a reflection on his joyfulness.

Walking on Sunshine blends numerous forms of Caribbean music with styles of funk, rock, pop and new wave. Press advertisements referred to it as a rhythmic fusion of reggae, pop, R&B and African music. While the first side features tough, culturally-themed songs, the second side is more pop-based and, according to writer Jo-Ann Greene, explores unique musical hybrids like Motown-inspired, calypso-styled disco, Latin-style "skankers" and "romantic swayers". Cliff White of Smash Hits referred to it as a "black 'symphony' album". The songs with reggae, funk and calypso rhythms are a musical continuation of Message Man, and Grant's synthesiser parts exude calypso-styled steel drum and orchestral-style sounds. He said the album reflected his joyousness, adding: "I'll try to show all people, black or white or whatever, that it's possible to seize a chance and make some use of it. I've never been a great one for talking about something, I've always believed in doing it."

The funky title track, featuring ethnic-style bass, subdued chanting and a synthesizer part, opens the album. "Living on the Frontline" features fiery, anti-oppression lyrics and fuses danceable electronic beats and 'tinkling' synthesiser with funk and reggae, leading to an "electronic-reggae" sound. The song extends into the lengthy "Frontline Symphony", which features a quasi-classical vocal section and heavy usage of keyboards. Writer David Thompson described the song as a "freakish chorale dub. "My Love, My Love" is a fusion of calypso and pop and was referred to by Grant as "real soca, the guts of my music". He intended for a horn section to play on the song, but the hired session musicians had issues with the tuning, so Grant played the part on a synth. He infused socially conscious themes into the love song "Just Imagine I'm Loving You", while "Dancing in Guyana" is a tribute to his native country. "Say I Love You" is another love song, which began life as a melody played on a Fender Rhodes, while "We Are" was intended more as a chant – "we are the sunshine, we are the light" – than a traditional song. The rootsy song closes the record, which according to Greene can segue back into the title track, "assuming you flip the album over fast enough."

== Release and promotion ==
The original 1978 Ice Records release of Walking on Sunshine was marketed specifically to African countries, especially Nigeria, where it became Grant's third Gold-certified album, and where "Say I Love You" became a hit single. To avoid the monetary expenses of using other British companies to export records to the regions, as had been the case with his previous Ice releases, the singer bought the first British pressing plant, British Homophone, to press copies of Walking on Sunshine for this purpose. However, early during its success, the Nigerian government banned the importation of records as it was harmful to their economy. This prevented Grant from sending a further 10,000-20,000 copies he had pressed, and he and his brother sold some of these copies to British retailers, especially in London, to clear their stock. Grant also delivered copies to several nightclubs, some of which began playing "Living on the Frontline". Over time, goers at these clubs began demanding to hear the song, and its popularity spread to other clubs, ultimately leading to promotional white label copies of the song being distributed among the most popular discos.

"Despite its breakthrough to the charts via discos, 'Living on the Frontline' isn't a conventional disco record. It wasn't written with discos in mind. It wasn't recorded or mixed with discos in mind. It wasn't even originally intended for release in Britain!"

— Cliff White, Smash Hits

Planning to release the song commercially in Britain if he could secure a distributor, Grant sent his brother to buy back copies all remaining copies of Walking on Sunshine from shops, who now priced it at £20, to increase demand for the song, and to relaunch the album majorly at a later date. The musician secured a one-time distribution deal with Ensign Records for the song, who released the song under a split-logo deal with Ice. It spent eleven weeks on the UK Singles Chart in summer 1979, peaking at number 11 in July. Due to the combination of its unusual success story and unconventional sound, Cliff White from Smash Hits felt it was "the most left-field smasharoonie for a long time," while Grant described how it would have never become a hit through the means of regular media, instead only becoming possible because of "the people in the street", explaining: "Those kids in the discos, they went and got an obscure record, issued through an obscure record company, and they commanded the disc jockeys to play it. I've always dreamed of something like that happening, and I think this record is adequate proof that it's possible."

Ice signed with WEA for a longer distribution deal, as announced in early August 1979 by Music Week in an article showing Grant and WEA's Tony Calder toasting the deal. However, a major clause in the contract displeased Grant and he instead signed over Ice's distribution to Virgin Records in the middle of the month, delaying Ice's schedule by a week. The title track was rush-released as a single in August 1979, and was playlisted by Plymouth Sound FM, as well as receiving additional play on Radio 1. However, the song – with its "hidden almost Hi-Tension power", according to James Hamilton – was less immediate than "Frontline", and failed to chart. After signing an American distribution deal with Epic Records, Ice released Walking on Sunshine anew in the UK, US and Europe on 1 October 1979. Grant felt that some listeners may be disgruntled that the record contains no further material that sounds like the hit single, and the album ultimately did not chart.

== Critical reception and legacy ==
Professional ratings
Review scores
Source	Rating
AllMusic	4.5/5 stars
Christgau's Record Guide	B−
Encyclopedia of Popular Music	3/5 stars
Music Week	3/4 stars
Reggae & Caribbean Music	9/10
The Rolling Stone Album Guide	3/5 stars

Among contemporary reviews of the 1979 release, a writer for The Press and Journal felt that the "talented" Grant "can make reggae sound interesting", and praised Walking on Sunshine for its accessible, melodic material. Billboard praised the "imaginative" album for spotlighting Grant's "considerable talent", and described the blend of funk and reggae on "Living on the Front Line" as providing "a pointer to the way the two forms can successfully combine in the '80s". In an article on Grant for Sounds, Vivien Goldman wrote how "the whole album grows on me more and more – even the alien calypso rhythms have me hooked after a few spins." "Living on the Frontline" was ranked 22nd by NME in their year-end 1979 best singles list. In Christgau's Record Guide (1981), Robert Christgau noted the synthesiser's calypsonian, steel-drum feel and attractive orchestral sounds and praised the "dancey and more" first side, but felt the second side was "thrown away" with "quite uncalypsonian" lyrics.

In a retrospective review, Jo-Ann Greene of AllMusic praised the album, "a labor of love and self-confidence", as "one of the most powerful records of its time," highlighting Grant's "faith in himself and the human race" and the album's numerous sonic innovations. In her AllMusic biography on Grant, she called it "one of the greatest albums of the decade." Jim Green of Trouser Press, who described Message Man as a flawed debut with promise, felt Walking on Sunshine showed Grant's potential "in full flower" and was "well worth owning". In his book Reggae & Caribbean Music, critic Dave Thompson praised the album as a "seamless tapestry of Caribbean sounds", praising the "effortless pop" of the title track and the tough sound and themes of the remaining songs on side one, and while conceding the second side to be "perhaps weaker", praised "Dancing Guyana" as a suitable tribute to the country. The title track was re-released in May 1989 to promote the compilation Walking on Sunshine (The Best of Eddy Grant) and reached number 63 in the UK. In 2008, a "Deluxe Edition" of Walking on Sunshine was released by Ice and Universal Records, containing bonus tracks and a live bonus DVD.

== Track listing ==
All tracks composed and arranged by Eddy Grant

=== Side one ===
1. "Walking on Sunshine" – 5:22
2. "Living on the Frontline" – 5:57
3. "The Frontline Symphony" – 7:23

=== Side two ===
4. "My Love, My Love" – 4:35
5. "Just Imagine I'm Loving You" – 6:35
6. "Dancing in Guyana" – 3:21
7. "Say I Love You" – 3:55
8. "We Are" – 4:42

=== Deluxe Edition bonus tracks (2008) ===
10. "Say I Love You" (Disco Version) – 6:04
11. "Nobody's Got Time (Coach House Rhythm Section Pts. 1 & 2)" [Ice Single Version 1978] – 6:04
12. "Say I Love You (Wipe Mo Nfe E)" [Yoruba Version] – 15:37

=== Bonus DVD (2008) ===
==== Live at Luna Park, Buenos Aires: 29th April 1982 ====
1. "Intro: Living on the Frontline"
2. "Say I Love You"
3. "Jamaican Child"
4. "Neighbour, Neighbour"
5. "Cockney Black"
6. "Do You Feel My Love"
7. "Living on the Frontline"

==== Live in Milan, 1979 ====
1. "Jamaican Child"
2. "Curfew"
3. "Walking on Sunshine"
4. "Living on the Frontline"

== Personnel ==
Adapted from the liner notes of Walking on Sunshine

Musicians

- Eddy Grant - vocals, multiple instruments, backing vocals, engineer
- Jackie Robinson – backing vocals (track 8)
- Kofi Ayivor – congas (tracks 4, 5 and 8)
- Sonny Akpan – congas (tracks 5 and 8)
- George Agard – backing vocals (track 8)
- Conrad Isidore – drums (tracks 5 and 6), backing vocals (track 5)
- Roy "Spartacus R" Bedeau – backing vocals (track 5)
- Tony "Zap" Edmonds – piano (track 5)

Additional

- Jackie Mills – engineer
- Pete Walters – engineer
- Ron Telemaque – engineer
- Roy Marshall – engineer
- Herb Schmitz – photography
- Cooper/Stevens – design
