= Mighty Gabby =

Barbadian calypsonian (born 1948)

- Gabby performing live, February 2012

Background information
- Born: Anthony Carter; 30 March 1948 (age 78); Emmerton, Barbados
- Genres: Folk, ringbang, calypso
- Years active: 1968–present
- Label: Ice
- Website: www.facebook.com/MightyGabby

Anthony Carter (born 30 March 1948), better known as Mighty Gabby or simply Gabby, is a Barbadian calypsonian and folk singer, and a Cultural Ambassador for the island of Barbados.

== Career ==
Born in Emmerton, Carter was given the nickname "Gabby" as a child, and first had success as a calypsonian in 1968, when his "Heart Transplant" won him the title of Barbados Calypso Monarch. He won the title again in 1969 with "Family Planning", Rather than build on this success, he instead concentrated on acting for the next few years, joining the Barbados Theater Workshop and composing much of the music for its play Under the Duppy Parasol, which had a successful run in New York.

He returned to music, and carnival success, in 1976, his "Licks Like Fire" giving him the first of a string of victories at Crop Over. He was awarded the "Folk Singer of the Year' for three successive years from 1977 to 1979 for "Riots in the Land", "Bridgetown", and "Bajan Fisherman". In 1979, he won the Crop Over Road March title with "Burn Mr Harding", and went on to tour Cuba.

Gabby courted controversy in 1985 with "Cadavers", a commentary on the Barbados government's decision to allow dead bodies from the US to be stored on the island; he was sued by the government, but Prime Minister Tom Adams died before the case came to court, and the plan was subsequently shelved. He continued to produce controversial material, including "The List", which dealt with AIDS, "Jack" which criticised the local tourist industry for giving preferential treatment to foreign visitors, and "Boots", an attack on the government's assistance in the US invasion of Grenada.

He won the Calypso Monarch title for a third time in 1985 with ""West Indian Politician".

In the late 1980s, he began an association with singer and producer Eddy Grant, who owned the Blue Wave studio, helping to break through to a wider audience.

He won the Calypso Monarch title on four more occasions: in 1997, 1999, 2000, and 2010.

In 2004, he was named Cultural Ambassador of Barbados.

In November 2011, The Mighty Gabby was one of many Barbadian entertainers shown on the "Where in the World is Matt Lauer?" segment on NBC.

In 2012, he was awarded an honorary Doctor of Letter degree by the University of the West Indies.

In 2007, Gabby was named a Nigerian chief in a service at the Sons of God Apostolic Spiritual Baptist Church in Ealing Grove, Christ Church, Barbados. Gabby, who had recently visited Nigeria, was given the name Omowale, which means "our son has returned". The service was also to coincide with the United Nations designated Black Civilisation Day.

His song "Jack", which is an anthem against privatization of public beaches (mostly for the use of foreign tourists), has been sung at protests around the Caribbean.

Gabby is regarded as the "foremost folk singer in Barbados".

== Titles ==
- Calypso Monarch: 1968, 1969, 1985, 1997, 1999, 2000, 2010
- Crop Over: 1976, 1977, 1985
- Folk Singer of the Year: 1977, 1978, 1979
- Crop Over Road March: 1979, 1982

== Discography ==
- Across the Board (1989), Ice
- Large And In Charge (1991), Ice – with Grynner and Square One
- 500 Blue (1992), Ice – with Grynner
- Soca Trinity (1993), Ice – with Grynner and Bert "Panta" Brown

Compilations

- 'Til Now (1996), Ice
