= Romancing the Stone (song) =

Single by Eddy Grant

from the album Going for Broke
- B-side: "My Turn to Love You" (live)
- Released: 14 May 1984
- Genre: Reggae fusion, synth-pop, funk, rock
- Length: 3:30
- Label: Portrait; Parlophone; EMI
- Songwriter: Eddy Grant
- Producer: Eddy Grant

Eddy Grant singles chronology
"Till I Can't Take Love No More" (1983)	"Romancing the Stone" (1984)	"Boys in the Street" (1984)

Music video
- "Romancing the Stone" on YouTube

"Romancing the Stone" is a song written, recorded and produced by Eddy Grant, who released it from his 1984 album Going for Broke. It was intended for the 1984 feature film of the same name, and announced by Casey Kasem on the 30 June 1984 edition of American Top 40 as the title song to the movie, but ultimately was used only briefly in the film. Clips from the film appeared in at least one official music video for the song, which is also mentioned in the film's closing credits.

The single's B-side, "My Turn to Love You," was a live recording of a song Grant had previously written and made a hit in the Netherlands. The recording was taken from Eddy Grant's first and only live album, Live at Notting Hill, which documented his 1981 performance at London's Notting Hill Carnival.

In the United States, the song reached number 26 on the Billboard Hot 100 and number 22 on Cash Box during the summer of that year. It was a bigger hit in Canada, where it reached number seven. It was also a hit internationally, narrowly missing the Top 40 in Germany and the UK, but reaching number 28 in New Zealand.

"Romancing the Stone" was a hit on two other US charts. On the soul chart it went to No. 68, and on the dance charts, it peaked at No. 12.

== Chart history ==
=== Weekly charts ===
Chart (1984)	Peak position
Canada Top Singles (RPM)	7
Germany (GfK)	42
New Zealand (Recorded Music NZ)	28
South Africa (Springbok Radio)	20
UK Singles (Official Charts)	52
US Billboard Hot 100	26
US Billboard Hot Black Singles	68
US Billboard Hot Dance Club Play	12
US Billboard Top Rock Tracks	39
US Cash Box Top 100	22

=== Year-end charts ===
Chart (1984)	Rank
Canada Top Singles (RPM)	63
US Billboard (R&B)	78
US (Joel Whitburn's Pop Annual)	161
