= Do You Feel My Love =

- German picture sleeve

Single by Eddy Grant

from the album Can't Get Enough
- B-side: "Symphony for Michael Opus 2"
- Released: 7 November 1980
- Recorded: 1980
- Studio: The Coach House, Rockfield Studios, Monmouthshire, Wales
- Genre: Reggae
- Length: 3:01; 4:42 (12" version)
- Label: Ensign; ICE
- Songwriter: Eddy Grant
- Producer: Eddy Grant

Eddy Grant singles chronology
| "My Turn to Love You" (1980) | "Do You Feel My Love" (1980) | "Can't Get Enough of You" (1981) |

"Do You Feel My Love" is a song by British-Guyanese musician Eddy Grant from his album Can't Get Enough. It was his first major hit in many countries, and peaked at number 8 on the UK Singles Chart. Its B-side, "Symphony for Michael Opus 2," is a slightly reworked instrumental version of the A-side.

== Charts ==
| Chart (1980–1981) | Peak position |
|---|---|
| Australia (Kent Music Report) | 35 |
| Belgium (Ultratop 50 Flanders) | 8 |
| Finland (Suomen virallinen lista) | 11 |
| France (IFOP) | 5 |
| Germany (GfK) | 12 |
| Ireland (IRMA) | 16 |
| Israel (Israeli Singles Chart) | 9 |
| Netherlands (Dutch Top 40) | 12 |
| Netherlands (Single Top 100) | 8 |
| New Zealand (Recorded Music NZ) | 3 |
| South Africa (Springbok Radio) | 6 |
| Spain (AFYVE) | 9 |
| Sweden (Sverigetopplistan) | 5 |
| Switzerland (Schweizer Hitparade) | 3 |
| UK Singles (Official Charts) | 8 |
| Zimbabwe (ZIMA) | 13 |
