= I Don't Wanna Dance (Eddy Grant song) =

- British picture sleeve

Single by Eddy Grant

from the album Killer on the Rampage
- B-side: "I Don't Wanna Dance" (Acapella)
- Released: 24 September 1982
- Genre: Reggae, pop rock
- Length: 3:40 (album version); 3:20 (UK single version); 5:40 (12" version)
- Label: Ice
- Songwriter: Eddy Grant
- Producer: Eddy Grant

Eddy Grant singles chronology
"I Love You, Yes I Love You" (1981)	"I Don't Wanna Dance" (1982)	"Electric Avenue" (1983)

Music video
- "I Don't Wanna Dance" on YouTube

"I Don't Wanna Dance" is a 1982 single by Guyanese-British singer-songwriter Eddy Grant. It went to number one on the UK Singles Chart and held there for three weeks in November 1982. It was later released in the United States, but only reached No. 53 on the Billboard Hot 100 in late 1983. It was later reissued on a 1991 single with "Electric Avenue", a song from the same album.

The song expresses Eddy's farewell to Britain being a land of class and colour divisions. Grant explained to the Daily Telegraph on 27 June 2008: "I Don't Wanna Dance can mean that you don't want to go out on the dancefloor or it could mean that you don't want to go along with an idea. That's how I try to write: you take it how you want, but I am basically a writer of protest."

In a 1988 interview for Yugoslav RTV Revija, Grant said: "I Don't Wanna Dance was created during a tour. I was sitting in the dressing room, waiting for my concert to begin. Suddenly I put together the chords and, tone by tone, the outline of the song was born. Since I'm not an exclusively reggae, rock or pop musician, I'm not limited in my songwriting."

Written and produced by Grant, it was the most successful of his solo singles in the United Kingdom, and his first number one since "Baby Come Back" by The Equals in 1968.

== Charts ==
=== Weekly charts ===
Chart (1982–1983)	Peak position
Australia (Kent Music Report)	21
Austria (Ö3 Austria Top 40)	2
Belgium (Ultratop 50 Flanders)	1
Canada (CHUM)	17
Canada Top Singles (RPM)	15
Ireland (IRMA)	1
Netherlands (Dutch Top 40)	2
Netherlands (Single Top 100)	2
New Zealand (Recorded Music NZ)	1
South Africa (Springbok Radio)	1
Sweden (Sverigetopplistan)	18
Switzerland (Schweizer Hitparade)	1
UK Singles (Official Charts)	1
US Billboard Hot 100	53
West Germany (GfK)	7

=== Year-end charts ===
Chart (1982)	Position
Netherlands (Dutch Top 40)	59
Netherlands (Single Top 100)	27

Chart (1983)	Position
Australia (Kent Music Report)	75
Austria (Ö3 Austria Top 40)	11
Belgium (Ultratop Flanders)	80
West Germany (Official German Charts)	23

== See also ==
- List of UK Singles Chart number ones of the 1980s
- List of number-one singles of the 1980s (Switzerland)
- List of number-one singles of 1982 (Ireland)
