= Killer on the Rampage =

- Original European cover

Studio album by Eddy Grant
- Released: November 1982 (UK); March 1983 (US)
- Recorded: 1982
- Studios: Blue Wave Studios, St. Phillip, Barbados
- Genres: Rock; funk; pop; reggae; disco; new wave
- Length: 41:39
- Labels: Ice; Portrait/CBS
- Producer: Eddy Grant

Eddy Grant chronology
Can't Get Enough (1981)	Killer on the Rampage (1982)	Going for Broke (1984)

Alternative cover
- US cover

Singles from Killer on the Rampage
- 1. "I Don't Wanna Dance" Released: 24 September 1982; 2. "Electric Avenue" Released: 3 January 1983; 3. "War Party" Released: 15 April 1983 (Europe only)

Killer on the Rampage is the sixth studio album by British musician Eddy Grant. It was released in November 1982 in the UK through Ice Records and March 1983 in the US, on Portrait Records. It remains his most successful album, reaching the top 10 in the US and the UK. It features the hits "Electric Avenue" (which became a hit in the US and UK at No. 2), "I Don't Wanna Dance" (a UK No. 1 hit) and "War Party" (a UK No. 42).

== Background ==
Following the British success of his previous album Can't Get Enough, Grant decided to move from England to Barbados and continue recording at his soon-to-be-built Blue Wave Studios. During the flight to his new home, Grant's luggage containing all of the songs he had written to be recorded for his next album were lost, never to be recovered. Forced to write an entire album from scratch, among the new songs were two of his biggest hits, "Electric Avenue" and "I Don't Wanna Dance".

== Reception ==
Billboard recommended the album in their 26 March 1983 issue, saying, "What keeps Grant from falling into a non-commercial reggae bag, while adding something fresh to reggae-rock blends, is his highly electric approach, stinging guitars and ringing vocals." A week later, Brian Chin, with Billboard, noted standout tracks on the album, saying "the love songs, 'Too Young To Fall' and 'Latin Love Affair,' have intense, euphoric sway to them, and 'Funky Rock And Roll' is the latest in Grant's string of ingenious keyboard arrangements. Cashbox said "the LP contains elements of pop, techno-funk, rock and reggae within a commercially viable, streamlined framework." In a retrospective review for AllMusic, Jo-Ann Greene noted that "'Funky Rock'N'Roll' headed more toward rock while tossing in a solid dance beat, while the tough 'War Party' melded together funk and deep roots."

== Track listing ==
All tracks are written by Eddy Grant.

Side One
No.	Title	Length
1.	"Electric Avenue"	3:48
2.	"I Don’t Wanna Dance"	3:40
3.	"It's All in You"	4:26
4.	"War Party"	3:54
5.	"Funky Rock ’N’ Roll"	4:30

Side Two
No.	Title	Length
6.	"Killer on the Rampage"	3:29
7.	"Too Young to Fall"	4:28
8.	"Latin Love Affair"	4:18
9.	"Another Revolutionary"	5:16
10.	"Drop, Baby, Drop"	3:33

- Track 6 is moved down to track 10 on some releases.

=== Bonus tracks ===
US cassette release
No.	Title	Original release	Length
6.	"Electric Avenue" (Extended Version)	"Electric Avenue" 12" single	6:18
12.	"Time Warp"	12" B-side for "Can't Get Enough of You" – also released on the US B-side of "Electric Avenue"	5:56

Deluxe edition
No.	Title	Original release	Length
11.	"Electric Avenue" (Extended Version)	See above	6:18
12.	"I Don't Wanna Dance" (Extended Version)	"I Don't Wanna Dance" 12" single	5:41
13.	"War Party" (Bajan Remix Extended Version)	"War Party" 12" single	8:28

== Personnel ==
Musicians

- Eddy Grant - vocals, guitars, synthesizers, drums

Technical

- Eddy Grant - production
- Frank Aggarat - engineer
- Tim "TimTom" Young - mastering
- Simon Fowler - photography

== Charts ==
=== Weekly charts ===
Chart (1982–1983)	Peak position
Australian Albums (Kent Music Report)	11
Austrian Albums (Ö3 Austria)	16
Canada Top Albums/CDs (RPM)	4
Dutch Albums (Album Top 100)	45
German Albums (Offizielle Top 100)	11
New Zealand Albums (RMNZ)	9
Swedish Albums (Sverigetopplistan)	30
UK Albums (Official Charts)	7
US Billboard 200	10

=== Year-end charts ===
Chart (1983)	Position
Canada Top Albums/CDs (RPM)	13
German Albums (Offizielle Top 100)	55
US Billboard 200	51
