= Yop =

Yogurt drink

Yop, created and marketed by Yoplait, is a semi-liquid yogurt sold in supermarkets and convenience stores in Belgium, Canada, France, Ireland, Switzerland, the United Kingdom, and occasionally in the Netherlands, Portugal, Spain and the United States. The Yoplait's Smoothie drink in Sweden and Norway is called Safari.

Yop is available in a variety of flavours including: banana, blueberry, chocolate, coconut, energy (peach/pineapple/cereal), lemon, mango, peach, raspberry, red fruits, strawberry, strawberry-banana, tropical and vanilla. Different flavours are available in different markets.

== History ==
Yop is a product originally from France, and is produced by the yogurt manufacturer Yoplait. Later Yop was marketed to different countries worldwide. Yoplait claims that Yop was the first drinkable yogurt in Canada.

== Advertising ==
=== UK relaunch ===
Yoplait commissioned an advertising campaign, from McCann-Erickson, when they re-launched Yop as the "smoother way to start the day" in April 2004. The campaign targeted teenagers with the television advert featuring teenagers singing a parody of the Eddy Grant song, "Gimme Hope Jo'anna". The song was reworked into "Gimme Yop, Me Mama" and the teenagers, who are seen asleep against a toilet-roll holder or propped up in the bathroom, demand that their mothers give them the drink to wake them up.

=== Availability ===
Yop comes within and between countries in different bottle sizes. In some countries the bottle size is indicated in litres in others in grams. Smaller bottles are in some countries called: Yop baby (100 g France), Yop mini (180 g Belgium and France) and YOP & GO (300 g Belgium, 330 g France, 30 cl Switzerland)

	Yop					Safari
	Belgium	Canada	France	Switzerland	United Kingdom	Sweden
Banana		200 ml				
Blueberry		200 ml				
Chocolate	180 g^{2} 800 g		180 g^{2}		~~500 g~~ 825g	
Coconut	800 g	200 ml	850 g		~~500 g~~	
Energy (peach/pineapple/cereal)	800 g		850 g			
Lemon	800 g		850 g			
Mango	800 g	200 ml	850 g			
Peach		200 ml				
Raspberry	180 g^{2} 300 g^{3}	200 ml	180 g^{2} 330 g^{3} 750 g		~~100 g~~ 330 g 500 g ~~750 g~~	180 g
Red fruits/ Forest fruits	800 g		850 g		~~100 g~~ ~~180 g~~ ~~207 g~~ ~~330 g~~ ~~400 g~~	
Strawberry	180 g^{2} 300 g^{3} 800 g	200 ml	100 g^{1} 180 g^{2} 330 g^{3} 850 g	30 cl^{2}	825g 180g ~~207 g~~ ~~330g~~ 500 g ~~750 g~~	180 g 300 g
Strawberry-banana	800 g	200 ml	180 g^{2} 850 g			
Strawberry-vanilla					~~180 g~~ ~~207 g~~ ~~400 g~~	
Tropical	180 g^{2}	200 ml			500 g	
Cookies & Cream		200 ml				
Creamsicle		200 ml				
Vanilla	180 g^{2} 300 g^{3} 800 g	200 ml	180 g^{2} 330 g^{3} 850 g		500 g, 825g	300 g

˄1: Mini Yop
˄2: P'tit Yop
˄3: YOP & GO

== Product information ==
=== Storage ===
Keep refrigerated between 2 °C and 5 °C. It is best to consume shortly after opening. Mini Yop, P'tit Yop and YOP & GO keeps for up to 8 hours outside the fridge.

=== Ingredients ===
Skim milk, water, sugar, cream, fruit puree, active bacterial cultures, natural and artificial flavours, modified milk ingredients, concentrated lemon juice, modified corn starch, pectin, locust bean gum, colour, vitamin D3, potassium sorbate, sodium and calcium citrate.

=== Average nutritional values ===
	Per bottle (200 mL)
Energy	333kJ / 79kcal
Protein	5 grams
Fat, total	7%
saturated	15%
Carbohydrates	22 g
sugars	22 g
Fibre	0%
Sodium	2%
Calcium	15%
Magnesium	
Phosphorus	
Iron	0%
Vitamins (A, B2, B5, B12, C, D)	total: 40%
