= Can't Get Enough (Eddy Grant album) =

Studio album by Eddy Grant
- Released: May 1981
- Recorded: 1981
- Studios: The Coach House Recording Studios, Stamford Hill, London
- Genres: Reggae, funk, synth-pop, new wave
- Length: 39:43
- Label: Ice
- Producer: Eddy Grant

Eddy Grant chronology
Love in Exile (1980)	Can't Get Enough (1981)	Killer on the Rampage (1982)

Singles from Can't Get Enough
- 1. "Do You Feel My Love" Released: 7 November 1980; 2. "Can't Get Enough of You" Released: 27 March 1981; 3. "I Love You, Yes I Love You" Released: 3 July 1981; 4. "Time to Let Go / California Style" Released: 13 November 1981

Professional ratings
Review scores
Source	Rating
AllMusic	3/5 stars

Can't Get Enough is the fifth studio album by British-Guyanese musician Eddy Grant. It was released in 1981 on Grant's own label Ice Records. Sales were lifted by Grant's one-off distribution deal with RCA Records, which helped it become his UK album chart debut, peaking at No. 39. The album was also available as a 2-in-1 cassette, with one side containing Can't Get Enough and the other containing Message Man. It features the UK hits "Do You Feel My Love", "Can't Get Enough of You" and "I Love You, Yes I Love You". "Time to Let Go" was also released as a single but did not chart; however, its B-side, "California Style", was later included on Grant's first compilation album, The Killer at His Best – All the Hits. The cover photo was taken by David Bailey.

== Track listing ==
All tracks are written by Eddy Grant.

Side one
No.	Title	Length
1.	"Do You Feel My Love"	3:00
2.	"Time to Let Go"	4:52
3.	"That Is Why"	5:01
4.	"I Love to Truck"	6:18

Side two
No.	Title	Length
1.	"Can't Get Enough of You"	4:22
2.	"Give Yourself to Me"	3:37
3.	"I Love You, Yes I Love You"	3:56
4.	"Kill 'Em with Kindness"	4:30
5.	"California Style"	4:07
Total length:		39:43

== Personnel ==
Adapted from the liner notes:

- Eddy Grant - lead vocals, backing vocals, bass guitar, electric guitar, drums, percussion, keyboards, piano, synthesizer
- Sonny Akpan - congas
- Jimmy Haynes - bass guitar on "That Is Why"
- Marcus James - bass guitar on "Give Yourself to Me"
- Doreen Henry, Rosemary Hibbert - backing vocals on "That Is Why" and "Give Yourself to Me"

Technical

- Eddy Grant - production
- Frank Aggarat - engineering
- Dave Field - artwork
- David Bailey - photography (front)
- Saddri Derradji - photography (back)
