= File Under Rock =

Studio album by Eddy Grant
- Released: April 1988
- Recorded: Blue Wave Studios
- Genres: Rock, reggae
- Length: 38:29
- Labels: Parlophone, Blue Wave
- Producer: Eddy Grant

Eddy Grant chronology
Born Tuff (1986)	File Under Rock (1988)	Barefoot Soldier (1990)

Singles from File Under Rock
- 1. "Gimme Hope Jo'anna" Released: 11 January 1988; 2. "Harmless Piece of Fun" Released: 12 April 1988; 3. "Put a Hold on It" Released: October 1988

File Under Rock is the ninth studio album by Guyanese-British musician Eddy Grant, released in April 1988. The album includes the song "Gimme Hope Jo'anna" which was a hit in Switzerland and New Zealand as well as "Harmless Piece of Fun" which was a minor hit in the Netherlands, and "Put a Hold on It," which charted at No. 79 in the UK. The album was titled File Under Rock in response to years of Eddy Grant being incorrectly described as a reggae artist.

== Reception ==
Music Week gave a lukewarm review, saying "Fans of Grant's recent singles will buy this record but only half of the material will please." In Germany, the album charted for 10 weeks reaching number 48 in 1988. The album was a larger success in New Zealand where it reached number 24 on the charts and charted for 13 weeks. In the Netherlands the album reached number 36, but was only on the charts for 4 weeks. AllMusic's Alex Henderson described the album as being mostly pop rock with slight reggae influences.

== Track listing ==
All tracks are written by Eddy Grant.

Side one
No.	Title	Length
1.	"Harmless Piece of Fun"	4:19
2.	"Don't Talk to Strangers"	4:05
3.	"Hostile Country"	4:23
4.	"Win or Lose"	4:20
5.	"Gimme Hope Jo'anna"	4:04

Side two
No.	Title	Length
6.	"Another Riot"	4:49
7.	"Say Hello to Fidel"	4:42
8.	"Chuck (Is the King)"	4:26
9.	"Long as I'm Wanted by You"	4:35
10.	"Put a Hold on It"	4:00
Total length:		38:29

== Sales and certifications ==
Certifications for File Under Rock
Region	Certification	Certified units/sales
Spain (Promusicae)	Gold	50,000^{^}
^{^} Shipments figures based on certification alone.
