= Plaisance, Guyana =

Plaisance
- town
- Location in Guyana
- Coordinates: 6°48′N 58°06′W
- Country: Guyana
- Region: Demerara-Mahaica

Population (2012)
  - Total: 2,854
- Time zone: UTC-4
- Climate: Af

Plaisance is a village in Guyana between Better Hope and Goedverwagting. It was purchased by freed slaves from cattle farmer A J Watershodt for $39,000 after the abolition of slavery in 1838. It was officially declared a village in 1892.

Famous people associated with the village include musician brothers Eddy Grant and Rudy Grant, as well as footballer Alex Bunbury who were born there.
