= Ringbang =

Caribbean music genre

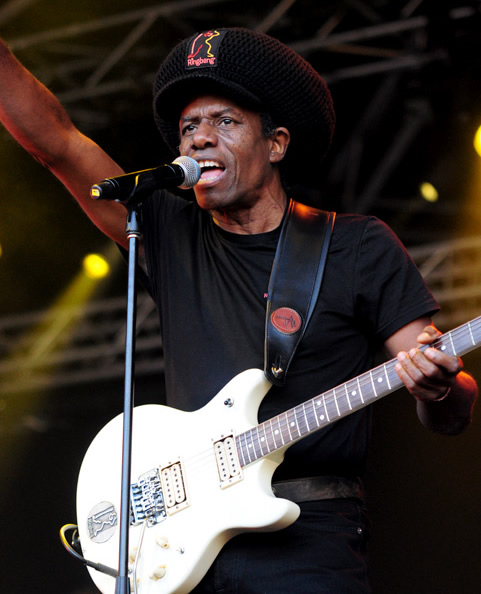
- Eddy Grant, proponent of Ringbang
- Stylistic origins: Calypso; reggae; soca; tuk bands; zouk
- Cultural origins: Mid-1990s
- Typical instruments: Vocals; electric guitar; bass guitar; acoustic guitar; steelpan; drums; piano; synthesizer; keyboards

Other topics
- Pop music; Caribbean music

Ringbang is a Caribbean fusion of music genres propounded by Eddy Grant in 1994.

In an interview circa 2000, Grant defined ringbang like this:

Ringbang is the thing that makes the soul quiet. That in a musical concept is rhythm. A child is given ringbang when a mother rocks it in her arms. Ringbang allowed the slaves to communicate. Ringbang is a bridge that allows us to stop being insular; it is a concept predicated on our being able to communicate with one another.

In applying ringbang to music, Grant attempted to define a meta-style to encompass all Caribbean rhythms; it was to be a musical lingua franca. He wished this multicultural style to place no restrictions on instrumentation, and he said that he wanted no single country or culture to lay claim to it. Among ringbang's stylistic influences are calypso, reggae, soca, tuk, and zouk.

Grant says that the word "ringbang" comes from vocalists scat singing "Ringa-ringa-ringbang!". He chose the word one day in 1993, while standing in recording engineer Frank Agarrat's backyard in Trinidad.

== Ringbang music ==
In an attempt to popularise ringbang music and its underlying philosophy, Grant asked various recording artists to apply the word (which he trademarked) to some of their songs. Barbadian recording artists Grynner, Square One, Viking Tundah, and others recorded ringbang tracks for Grant's record labels, Ice Records and Blue Wave Records. Among the ringbang albums on these labels were Fire in de Wave (1994), Ringbang Rebel Dance (1995), Ringbang Souljah (1996), and Ringbang Revolution (1997).

On New Year's Eve 1999, Grant hosted a concert in Tobago called Ringbang Celebration 2000, at which he performed with the Frontline Orchestra. The event drew approximately 11,000 people, and featured performances by artists from Antigua, Barbados, and Trinidad and Tobago. Calypso musician Lord Kitchener's brief appearance at the event was his final time onstage, as he died the following February.

In March 2003, Ice Records published Ringbang 4 Kids, a selection of songs intended for children of primary school age. The songs were performed by Barbadian singer Indra Rudder, who had previously sung backing vocals for several Ice Records tracks.

== See also ==
- African aesthetic
- Caribbean Carnival
- List of Caribbean music genres
