= Going for Broke (album) =

Studio album by Eddy Grant
- Released: June 1984
- Genres: Reggae, synth-pop, funk
- Length: 39:30
- Label: Portrait/CBS
- Producer: Eddy Grant

Eddy Grant chronology
Killer on the Rampage (1982)	Going for Broke (1984)	Born Tuff (1986)

Singles from Going for Broke
- 1. "Till I Can't Take Love No More" Released: 7 October 1983; 2. "Romancing the Stone" Released: 14 May 1984; 3. "Boys in the Street" Released: 6 October 1984

Professional ratings
Review scores
Source	Rating
AllMusic	3/5 stars

Going for Broke is the seventh studio album by Eddy Grant, released in June 1984. Following the major success of the previous Killer on the Rampage, this album takes a similar approach but was not as successful. It featured the U.S. hit "Romancing the Stone", as well as the singles "Till I Can't Take Love No More" and "Boys in the Street".

"Romancing the Stone" was intended for the 1984 feature film of the same name, and was announced by Casey Kasem on the 30 June 1984 edition of American Top 40 as the title song of the movie, but ultimately was used only briefly, though clips from the film appeared in at least one official music video for the song, and the song is mentioned in the film's closing credits.

A music video for "Boys in the Street" entered rotation on MTV in mid-October 1984.

== Reception ==
The LP debuted on Billboard's Rock Albums & Top Tracks chart on 23 June and stayed on it for 3 weeks, peaking at No. 45. On the same magazine's Black LPs chart, it debuted at No. 60 on 21 July, peaking at No. 53 on 11 August. It fared the worst on the Billboard 200, only peaking at No. 64. It was also a "Feature Pick" on Cashbox, which described the record as "a well-honed package of danceable pop cuts that lead off with his latest hit, the title track from the film Romancing The Stone." In the UK, Music Week stated, "Although his punchy reggae pop is by no means original, it makes for entertaining, undemanding airplay music, and thus, hit singles." Record Mirror, however, was less fond of the album, with Steven Gray commenting, "each song is an overweight synthetic pseudo-Caribbean stomp, featuring repetitive nonsense lyrics and, halfway through (cue glossy white axe and grin to match), THAT heavy metal guitar solo."

== Track listing ==
All tracks are written by Eddy Grant.

Side one
No.	Title	Length
1.	"Romancing the Stone"	4:54
2.	"Boys in the Street"	4:17
3.	"Come On Let Me Love You"	3:39
4.	"Till I Can't Take Love No More"	2:47
5.	"Political Bassa-Bassa"	5:06

Side two
No.	Title	Length
1.	"Telepathy"	3:37
2.	"Only Heaven Knows"	3:55
3.	"Ire Harry"	4:05
4.	"Rock You Good"	3:06
5.	"Blue Wave"	4:01
Total length:		39:30

== Charts ==
Chart (1984)	Peak position
Canada Top Albums/CDs (RPM)	34
German Albums (Offizielle Top 100)	48
US Billboard 200	64
US Billboard Black LPs	53
US Billboard Rock Albums & Top Tracks	45
