= Message Man =

Studio album by Eddy Grant
- Released: 1977
- Studio: The Coach House Recording Studio, Stamford Hill, London
- Genre: Reggae, funk, soca, pop
- Length: 46:32
- Label: Ice
- Producer: Eddy Grant

Eddy Grant chronology
Eddy Grant (1975)	Message Man (1977)	Walking on Sunshine (1979)

Professional ratings
Review scores
Source	Rating
Allmusic	link

Message Man is the second album by Eddy Grant. He plays almost every instrument and sings every voice on this album. The uncredited backing band was 90° Inclusive. The album is significant for its socio-political stance in songs such as "Race Hate" and "Cockney Black". The track, "Hello Africa", is considered a major highlight of this album with Grant creating a unique genre that remains difficult to categorize to this day.

== Track listing ==
All tracks composed and arranged by Eddy Grant

1. "Curfew" – 5:47
2. "It's Our Time" – 4:33
3. "Cockney Black" – 3:56
4. "Jamaican Child" – 3:20
5. "Get Down Soweto" – 4:38
6. "Hello Africa" – 11:55
7. "Race Hate" – 4:47
8. "Neighbour Neighbour" – 7:33

== Personnel ==
- Eddy Grant - lead vocals, all other instruments
- Winston Henry - bass on "Curfew", "Jamaican Child" and "Race Hate"
- Wayne Bonaparte - bass on "Neighbour Neighbour"
- Webster Dyer - organ on "Curfew", "Jamaican Child" and "Race Hate"
- Peter Nelson - acoustic piano on "Cockney Black"
- Delford Davis - drums on "Curfew", "Jamaican Child" and "Race Hate"
- Ron Telemaque - drums on "Hello Africa"
- Errol Wise - drums on "Neighbour Neighbour"
- Kofi Ayivor - congas on "Hello Africa"
- George Agard, Jackie Robinson - backing vocals on all tracks except "Hello Africa" and "Neighbour Neighbour"
- Herschell Holder, Lloyd Smith - horns on "It's Our Time"
- 90° Inclusive was Delford Davis, Henry Barnes, Hugh Francis, Webster Dyer, Winston Henry

Technical

- Frank Aggarat - engineer
- Dave Field - sleeve design, illustration

"Thanks to Akwila Simpasa for making me the Message Man, and to Victor Olakau for helping with the translations."
