= Baby, Come Back (The Equals song) =

1966 single by the Equals

- One of side labels of the UK single

Single by the Equals

from the album Unequalled Equals
- B-side: "Hold Me Closer"
- Released: 1 May 1968
- Studio: Regent Sound, London
- Genre: Garage rock; bubblegum pop
- Length: 2:37
- Label: President
- Songwriter: Eddy Grant
- Producer: Ed Kassner

Performance video
- "Baby, Come Back" on YouTube

"Baby, Come Back" is a song by English band the Equals from their 1967 album Unequalled Equals. Written by Eddy Grant, the song was originally released as a B-side in 1967 and was later released as a single in continental Europe before being released as a single in the UK in 1968. "Baby, Come Back" charted in multiple countries, including number 1 on the Belgian, Rhodesian and UK charts in 1967 and 1968.

The song has influences from Motown and ska. In the 1990s, Pato Banton and London Boys recorded cover versions of "Baby, Come Back" that were hits in their own right; Banton's version reached number 1 on the UK Singles Chart in 1994.

== The Equals version ==
=== Background and composition ===
The Equals were a group from North London, England formed in 1965 whose music was said to fuse pop, blues, ska, and beat.

"Baby, Come Back" has a 4/4 time signature compared to Motown and a beat driven by three guitars. Towards the end of the song, the band beatboxes in the style of ska. It was recorded at Regent Sound Studios on Denmark Street in London together with producer Ed Kassner and audio engineer Adrian Ibbetson.

=== Release ===
The song was first released on 9 June 1967 as a B-side to "Hold Me Closer". However, after impressive sales in the rest of Europe (it reached the top 10 in Belgium and the Netherlands) the song was re-issued in the UK on 1 May 1968 and reached number 1 on the UK Singles Chart for three consecutive weeks beginning 9 July 1968. In all the song stayed in the UK Top 75 for 18 weeks. In the US, the song charted at number 32 on the Billboard Hot 100 on 28 September 1968 and was the Equals' only track to chart in the US top 40.

=== Critical reception ===
For AllMusic, Steve Leggett called the song "impossibly catchy." In a 2006 review, Freaky Trigger called the song an "excellent pop track that happens to have been made by a mixed-race, mixed-birthplace British-Caribbean band."

In his 2005 book Turn the Beat Around: The Rise and Fall of Disco, Peter Shapiro wrote that "Baby, Come Back" was "a big influence on disco."

=== Charts ===
Chart (1967–68)	Peak position
Australia (Go-Set Top 40)	11
Belgium (Ultratop Flanders)	1
Belgium (Ultratop Wallonia)	3
Canada Top Singles (RPM)	9
France (SNEP)	2
Ireland (IRMA)	2
Netherlands (Dutch Top 40)	6
Netherlands (Single Top 100)	6
New Zealand (Listener)	4
Norway (VG-lista)	4
Rhodesia (Lyons Maid Hits of the Week)	1
South Africa (Springbok)	1
UK Singles (Official Charts)	1
US Billboard Hot 100	32
US Cash Box Top 100	26
West Germany (Official German Charts	11

=== Personnel ===
- Derv Gordon – lead vocals
- Eddy Grant – lead guitar, backing vocals
- Pat Lloyd – rhythm guitar, backing vocals
- Lincoln Gordon – rhythm guitar, bass, backing vocals
- John Hall – drums

== Eddy Grant version ==
Eddy Grant himself recorded a new version of the song in 1984, which was exclusive to his first compilation album, The Killer at His Best – All the Hits. The circumstances under which Grant recorded the song are disputed. According to the 3 November 1984 issue of Music Week, Grant recorded it specifically for the compilation, but in the liner notes for All the Hits, Grant states he had already finished recording the song when he was asked to select the tracklist for the album. The single was released on 30 December but only charted in Germany, peaking at No. 58.

== London Boys version ==
"Baby Come Back"

Single by London Boys

from the album Love 4 Unity
- B-side: "Baby Come Back" (Instrumental)
- Released: 1993
- Genre: Europop; disco
- Length: 3:24
- Label: EastWest
- Songwriter: Eddy Grant
- Producer: Ralf René Maué

London Boys singles chronology
"Moonraker" (1992)	"Baby Come Back" (1993)	"Gospel Train to London" (1995)

In 1993, Europop duo London Boys released their version of "Baby Come Back" as the second single from their third album, Love 4 Unity (1993). The single was produced by Ralf René Maué. It was released by East West Records in Germany and Austria, peaking at number 27 in Austria. This was the last single under the name London Boys. The next and last two were recorded under the name the New London Boys.

=== Formats and track listings ===
- 7-inch single
1. "Baby Come Back" – 3:24
2. "Baby Come Back" (instrumental) – 3:23
- 12-inch single 1
1. "Baby Come Back" (Please Come Home extended version) – 6:05
2. "Baby Come Back" (Cavallino 12-inch remix Rapino Brothers) – 5:06
3. "Baby Come Back" (Affinity Tranceuro remix) – 5:38
- 12-inch single 2
1. "Baby Come Back" (Teryiaky with the Rapino Bros club mix) – 6:25
2. "Baby Come Back" (Teryiaky instrumental) – 6:28
3. "Baby Come Back" (Rapino 12-inch Handbag mix) – 5:20
4. "Baby Come Back" (Affinity Tranceuro mix) – 5:40
- CD single 1
1. "Baby Come Back" (radio edit) – 3:24
2. "Baby Come Back" (Please Come Home mix extended version) – 5:29
3. "Baby Come Back" (Cavallino 12-inch remix Rapino Brothers) – 5:06
4. "Baby Come Back" (Affinity Tranceuro remix) – 5:38
5. "Bob Marley" (Reggae Reggae Rasta Rasta) – 2:10
- CD single 2
1. "Baby Come Back" (original version) – 3:24
2. "Baby Come Back" (Rapino 7-inch Handbag mix) – 3:25
3. "Baby Come Back" (Teryiaky with the Rapino Bros club mix) – 6:25
4. "Baby Come Back" (Rapino 12-inch Handbag mix) – 5:20
5. "Baby Come Back" (Affinity Tranceuro mix) – 5:40

=== Personnel ===
- Edem Ephraim – vocals
- Dennis Fuller – choreographer, backing vocals
- Ralf René Maué – writer, producer
- The Rapino Brothers – remixes

=== Charts ===
Chart (1993)	Peak position
Austria (Ö3 Austria Top 40)	27
Finland (Suomen virallinen lista)	13
UK Singles (OCC)	95

== Pato Banton version ==
"Baby Come Back"

Single by Pato Banton featuring Ali and Robin Campbell

from the album Collections
- Released: 19 September 1994
- Genre: Reggae; ska
- Length: 3:55
- Label: Virgin
- Songwriter: Eddy Grant
- Producers: Susan Stoker; Michael Railton

Pato Banton singles chronology
"Come Again" (1988)	"Baby Come Back" (1994)	"This Cowboy Song" (1995)

"Baby Come Back" was covered by English reggae singer and toaster Pato Banton in 1994, who was joined by Robin and Ali Campbell of UB40. This version was different from the original in that it was in a more conventional, commercial reggae style and Banton added his own verses between the Campbells singing the original hook and chorus. It was produced by Susan Stoker and Michael Railton. Released in September 1994 by Virgin Records, the song peaked at number one on the UK Singles Chart.

=== Critical reception ===
In his weekly UK chart commentary, James Masterton wrote, "The new version is to be honest not half bad with toasting from newcomer Pato Banton and singing supplied by Ali and Robin Campbell from UB40, following Bitty McLean as the second protege they have helped into the charts. Easily a hit then and a possible contender for a Top 10 placing." Alan Jones from Music Week gave it a score of three out of five, adding, "A remake of the old Equal' hit, updated and reggafied by Banton in a jittery ska style, with vocal support from UB40's Campbell brothers Ali and Robin. A happy sound, and a minor hit."

=== Release and chart performance ===
Banton's version of "Baby Come Back" was released on 19 September 1994. It entered the UK Singles Chart at number 16, reaching number one during its fifth week on the chart, where it stayed for four weeks. It was the fourth-biggest-selling single of 1994 in the UK. In New Zealand, the song entered the chart on 30 October 1994 at number three, then rose to number two the following week, before beginning a four-week reign at number one from 13 November to 4 December 1994. In Australia, the single was released on 31 October 1994 and peaked at number 11 in January 1995. According to Virgin Records, about 750,000 copies were sold as of March 1995.

=== Music video ===
The accompanying music video for "Baby Come Back" was directed by Duncan Smith and produced by Julian Caidan for Telegram Productions. It was released on 19 September 1994 and is a pastiche of a 1960's music show featuring the brothers Robin and Ali Campbell from UB40 backing Pato Banton. The video was a Box Top on British music television channel The Box in November 1994. Later same month, it was B-listed on Germany's VIVA and received active rotation on MTV Europe.

=== Track listing ===
- UK CD single
1. "Baby Come Back" – 3:52
2. "Baby Come Back" (dub) – 6:03
3. "Niceness" (live) – 5:40
4. "Gwarn!" (new version) – 4:21

=== Charts ===
==== Weekly charts ====
Chart (1994)	Peak position
Australia (ARIA)	11
Austria (Ö3 Austria Top 40)	17
Belgium (Ultratop 50 Flanders)	6
Europe (Eurochart Hot 100)	4
Europe (European AC Radio)	7
Europe (European Dance Radio)	7
Europe (European Hit Radio)	4
Finland (Suomen virallinen lista)	19
France (SNEP)	26
Germany (GfK)	33
Iceland (Íslenski Listinn Topp 40)	18
Ireland (IRMA)	2
Israel (Israeli Singles Chart)	27
Netherlands (Dutch Top 40)	3
Netherlands (Single Top 100)	3
New Zealand (Recorded Music NZ)	1
Scottish Singles Sales (Official Charts)	1
Sweden (Sverigetopplistan)	26
Switzerland (Schweizer Hitparade)	20
UK Singles (Official Charts)	1
UK Airplay (Music Week)	1
UK Dance Singles (Music Week)	26
US Alternative Airplay (Billboard)	39

==== Year-end charts ====
Chart (1994)	Position
Belgium (Ultratop)	94
Europe (Eurochart Hot 100)	41
Netherlands (Single Top 100)	55
New Zealand (RIANZ)	23
UK Singles (OCC)	4

=== Certifications ===
Region	Certification	Certified units/sales
Australia (ARIA)	Gold	35,000^{^}
New Zealand (RMNZ)	Platinum	10,000^{*}
United Kingdom (BPI)	Platinum	600,000^{^}
^{*} Sales figures based on certification alone.^{^} Shipments figures based on certification alone.

== See also ==
- List of number-one singles from the 1960s (UK)
- List of number-one singles from the 1990s (UK)
