= Electric Avenue =

1983 single by Eddy Grant

- UK cover

Single by Eddy Grant

from the album Killer on the Rampage
- B-side: "Time Warp" (US); "Walking on Sunshine" (UK)
- Released: 3 January 1983 (7"); 10 January 1983 (12")
- Recorded: 1982
- Studio: Blue Wave (Barbados)
- Genre: Funk; reggae fusion; rock; new wave
- Length: 3:47 (album version); 3:12 (radio edit); 6:18 (12" version)
- Label: Ice
- Songwriter: Eddy Grant
- Producer: Eddy Grant

Eddy Grant singles chronology
"I Don't Wanna Dance" (1982)	"Electric Avenue" (1983)	"War Party" (1983)

Audio sample
- "Electric Avenue": file; help

Music video
- "Electric Avenue" on YouTube

"Electric Avenue" is a song by Guyanese-British musician Eddy Grant. Written and produced by Grant, it was released on his 1982 studio album Killer on the Rampage. In the United States, with the help of the MTV music video he made, it was one of the biggest hits of 1983. The song refers to Electric Avenue in London during the 1981 Brixton riot.

== Composition ==
The title of the song refers to Electric Avenue in the south London district of Brixton, the first market street to be lit by electricity. According to Grant, he first became aware of the existence of the street during a stint acting at the Black Theatre of Brixton. The area is now known for its high population of Caribbean immigrants. At the beginning of the 1980s, as identified by the Scarman Report, tensions over unemployment, racism and poverty exacerbated by racist policing culminated in the street events now known as the 1981 Brixton riot. Grant, horrified and enraged, wrote and composed a song in response to these events. Shortly after, Grant left the UK to live in Barbados, and his most recent batch of songs was lost during baggage transit. "Electric Avenue" was one of the songs he wrote immediately afterwards to make up for the lost material.

== Music video ==
Filmed in Barbados, the song's music video helped it to gain popularity in the United States. In the early years of MTV, the network ran music videos almost exclusively by white artists and was criticized by famous musicians, such as David Bowie, for not having black artists on the network. After Michael Jackson's "Billie Jean" aired and was highly successful, MTV scrambled to get other black artists into their rotation. Aided by its video's success, "Electric Avenue" quickly climbed up to the No. 2 spot on the Billboard Hot 100.

== Other release information ==
The original B-side to this song was a non-LP track titled "Time Warp", itself a stripped-down instrumental of "Nobody's Got Time", originally released in 1977. In the UK, the B-side was "Walking on Sunshine", the title track of his 1978 album. The 45 sold more than one million copies in the United States, earning a platinum certification. It was later re-issued with "I Don't Wanna Dance" as the flip side.

In 2001, Peter Black remixed "Electric Avenue" as the "Ringbang Remix", which was released on 28 May 2001. The single featured and reached number five on the UK Singles Chart in June 2001, as well as number 16 on the US Billboard Dance Club Play chart.

Until 2024, Eddy Grant's songs, including "Electric Avenue", were not available on music streaming platforms. Grant had refused to allow his music onto streaming sites because of his dislike of how the platforms pay artists, but relented in early 2024, saying he wanted his music to reach new listeners.

== Reception ==
Grant initially released it as a single in 1983, and it reached No. 2 on the UK Singles Chart. In 1983, Portrait/CBS decided to launch the single in the US, where it spent five weeks at number two on Billboard magazine's Hot 100 chart and hit number one on Cash Box magazine's chart. "Electric Avenue" was a hit on two other US charts: on the Hot Black Singles chart, it went to No. 18, and on the Dance/Disco Top 80 chart, it peaked at No. 6. It was nominated for a Grammy Award as Best R&B Song of 1983 but lost to Michael Jackson's "Billie Jean". Jamaican singer Bunny Wailer stated that "Electric Avenue" inspired the song "Electric Boogie", which he wrote for Marcia Griffiths in 1982.

== Charts ==
=== Weekly charts ===
==== Original version ====
Chart (1983)	Peak position
Australia (Kent Music Report)	2
Austria (Ö3 Austria Top 40)	6
Belgium (Ultratop 50 Flanders)	3
Canada (The Record)	1
Canada Top Singles (RPM)	1
France (IFOP)	37
Ireland (IRMA)	3
Netherlands (Dutch Top 40)	6
Netherlands (Single Top 100)	8
New Zealand (Recorded Music NZ)	32
South Africa (Springbok Radio)	9
Sweden (Sverigetopplistan)	9
Switzerland (Schweizer Hitparade)	6
UK Singles (Official Charts)	2
US Billboard Hot 100	2
US Dance/Disco Top 80 (Billboard)	6
US Hot Black Singles (Billboard)	18
US Top Rock Tracks (Billboard)	12
US Cash Box Top 100	1
West Germany (GfK)	9

Chart (2001)	Peak position
Austria (Ö3 Austria Top 40)	56
Denmark (Tracklisten)	20
Sweden (Sverigetopplistan)	26

==== Ringbang remix ====
Chart (2001)	Peak position
Belgium (Ultratip Bubbling Under Flanders)	4
Canada (Nielsen SoundScan)	27
Europe (Eurochart Hot 100)	23
Germany (GfK)	68
Ireland (IRMA)	11
Ireland Dance (IRMA)	3
Netherlands (Dutch Top 40)	22
Netherlands (Single Top 100)	31
Scottish Singles Sales (Official Charts)	5
Switzerland (Schweizer Hitparade)	100
UK Singles (Official Charts)	5
UK Dance (Official Charts)	12
US Dance Club Play (Billboard)	16

=== Year-end charts ===
Chart (1983)	Rank
Australia (Kent Music Report)	20
Belgium (Ultratop 50 Flanders)	46
Canada Top Singles (RPM)	6
Netherlands (Dutch Top 40)	76
UK Singles (OCC)	37
US Billboard Hot 100	22
US Cash Box Top 100	9
West Germany (Media Control)	63

Chart (2001)	Rank
Canada (Nielsen SoundScan)	122
UK Singles (OCC)	99

== Certifications ==
Region	Certification	Certified units/sales
Canada (Music Canada)	Platinum	100,000^{^}
United Kingdom (BPI)	Silver	250,000^{^}
United States (RIAA)	Platinum	1,000,000^{^}
^{^} Shipments figures based on certification alone.

== Cover versions ==
=== Refugee Camp All-Stars version ===
"Avenues"

Single by Refugee Camp All-Stars featuring Pras and Ky-Mani Marley
- Released: 1997
- Length: 3:56 (single version); 3:59 (album version)
- Label: Motor Music
- Songwriter: Eddy Grant
- Producers: Pras; Jerry Duplessis; Wyclef Jean

In 1997, Refugee Camp All-Stars covered the song for the original soundtrack of the film Money Talks. This version is titled "Avenues" and features Pras and reggae artist Ky-Mani Marley.

==== Charts ====
===== Weekly charts =====
Chart (1997)	Peak position
Belgium (Ultratip Bubbling Under Flanders)	7
Belgium (Ultratop 50 Wallonia)	32
Finland (Suomen virallinen lista)	12
Germany (GfK)	51
Netherlands (Dutch Top 40)	10
Netherlands (Single Top 100)	14
New Zealand (Recorded Music NZ)	4
Norway (VG-lista)	2
Sweden (Sverigetopplistan)	7
US Billboard Hot 100	35

===== Year-end charts =====
Chart (1997)	Position
Netherlands (Dutch Top 40)	86
Netherlands (Single Top 100)	69
Sweden (Topplistan)	22

=== Skindred version ===
Welsh alternative metal band Skindred released a cover of the song as a single in 2009. It was included on their album Shark Bites and Dog Fights.

== Usage in politics ==
The premier of the Canadian province of Ontario, Doug Ford, declared "Electric Avenue" to be Ontario's new "theme song" and then danced to the song during a visit to Oshawa on May 12, 2023, following a conference where he announced the creation of two new electric GO Transit buses for Oshawa and the Greater Toronto Area. The new buses opened for passengers to ride as of the following Monday.

US president Donald Trump, while running for re-election in 2020, tweeted out a 55-second commercial which used the song as background. Grant sued for copyright infringement as a result. On 15 September 2024, a federal judge in Manhattan ruled Trump had breached Grant's copyright for the song, and is now liable for damages as well as the singer's legal fees.

== See also ==
- List of Cash Box Top 100 number-one singles of 1983
- List of number-one singles of 1983 (Canada)
