= Eddy Grant =

British singer (born 1948)

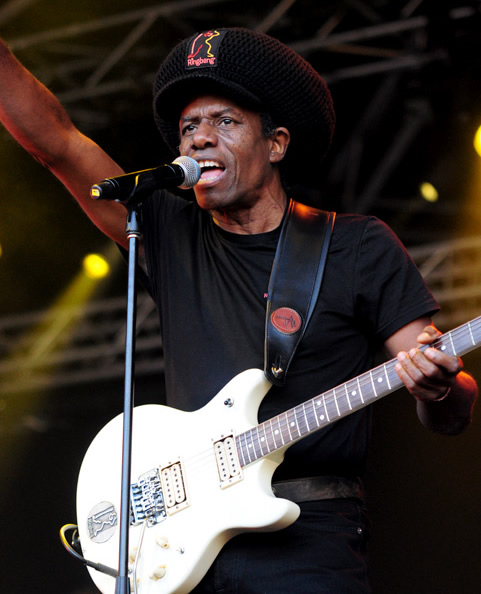
- Grant performing in July 2009

Background information
- Born: Edmond Montague Grant; 5 March 1948 (age 78); Plaisance, British Guiana
- Origin: London, England
- Genres: Reggae; calypso; soca; rock; ringbang; pop
- Occupations: Singer; songwriter; musician; record producer
- Instruments: Vocals; guitar; bass; drums; keyboards
- Years active: 1965–present
- Labels: Ice; Portrait; Epic; Enigma; Parlophone
- Formerly of: The Equals

Edmond Montague Grant (born 5 March 1948) is a Guyanese-born British singer, songwriter, multi-instrumentalist, and record producer. Noted for his genre-blending style and socially conscious lyrics, he is the creator of the musical genre known as ringbang.

Grant rose to prominence as a founding member of the Equals, one of the UK's first racially mixed bands who are best remembered for the hit song "Baby, Come Back" (1967), which Grant wrote and performed lead guitar and backing vocals on. His subsequent solo career spawned songs such as "I Don't Wanna Dance" (1982), "Electric Avenue" (1983), and the anti-apartheid anthem "Gimme Hope Jo'anna" (1988). "Electric Avenue" reached platinum status, became his biggest international hit, and earned a Grammy Award nomination.

== Early life ==
Edmond Montague Grant was born in Plaisance, British Guiana (now Guyana) on 5 March 1948. He later moved to Linden. His father, Patrick, was a trumpeter who played in a band called Nello and the Luckies. He has a younger brother named Rudy, who is also a musician. His parents lived and worked in England while he was at school, and they would send money back to Guyana for his education. In 1960, he and his brother joined their parents in the Kentish Town area of London. He attended Acland Burghley Secondary Modern in Tufnell Park, where he learned to read and write music. He became an avid fan of American musician Chuck Berry, and decided on a career in music after seeing Berry perform at the Finsbury Park Astoria.

== Career ==
=== The Equals ===
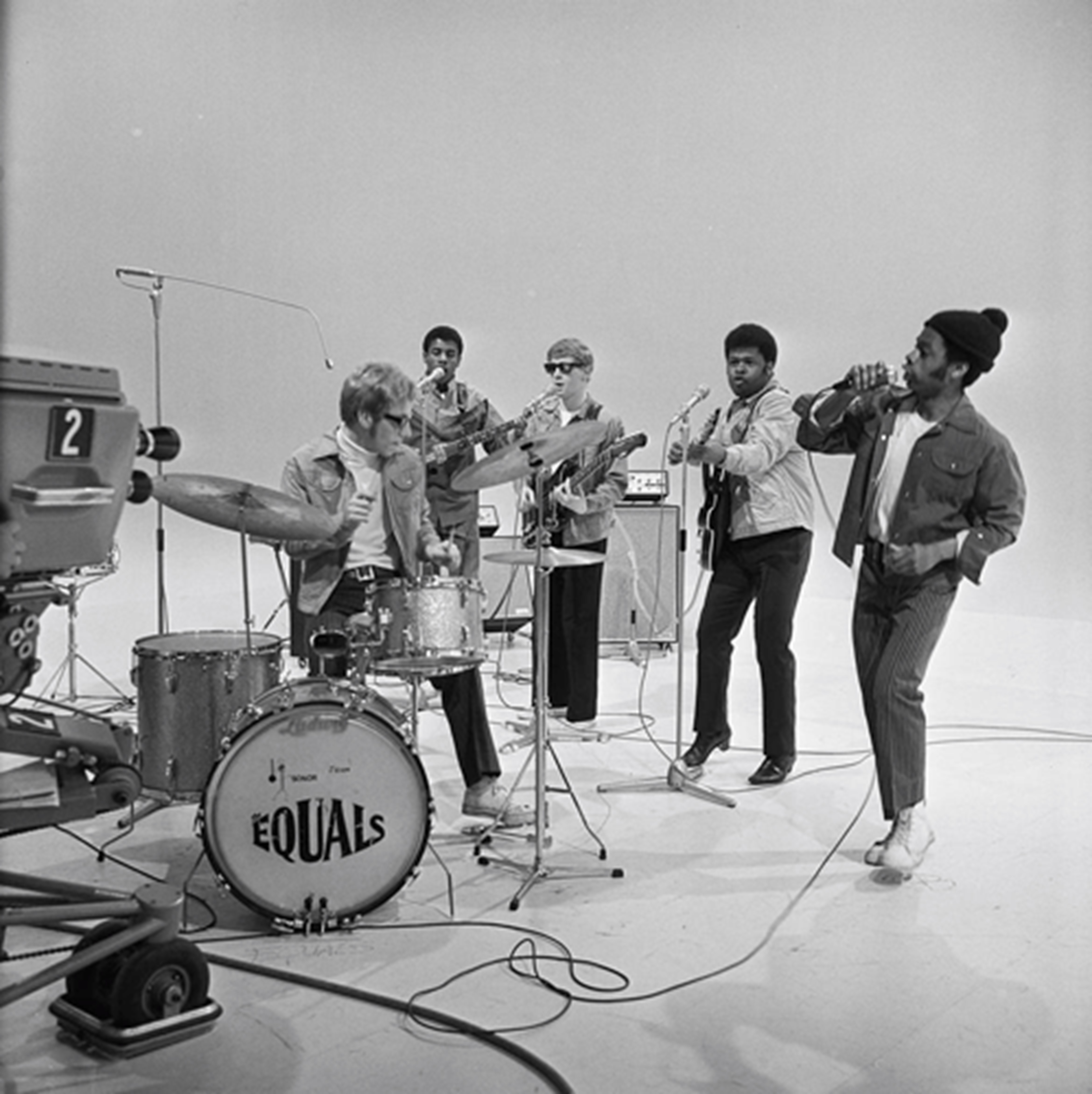
The Equals performing on Dutch TV, May 1967

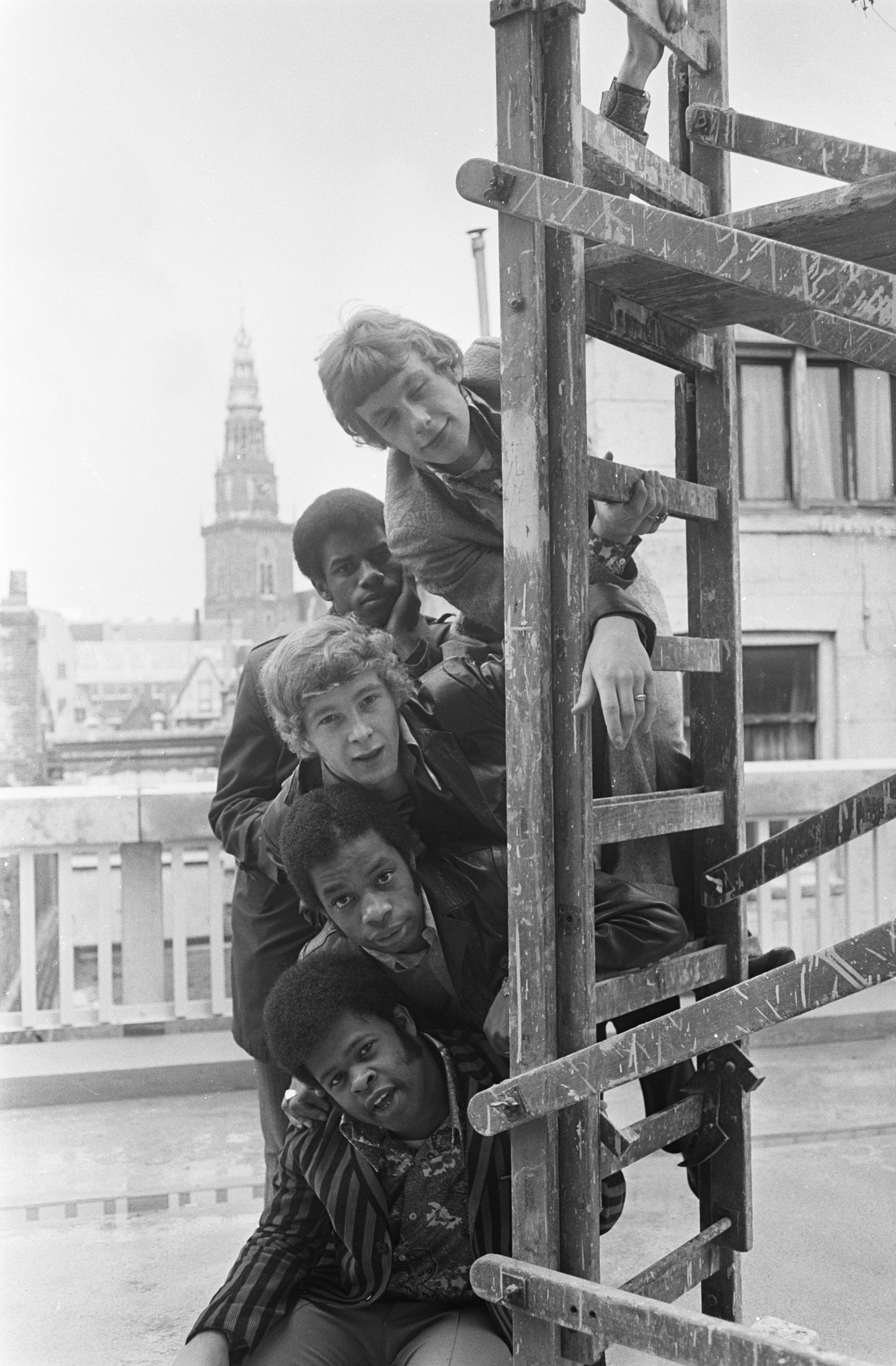
Grant (second from top) in Amsterdam with the Equals, April 1968

In 1964, at the age of 16, Grant formed the Equals with some schoolmates. They were one of the UK's first racially mixed bands. He played lead guitar and sang background vocals, and the band had two hit albums and a minor hit single with the song "I Get So Excited". Their most famous work came when Grant wrote their No. 1 hit song "Baby, Come Back" in 1968. The song later topped the UK Singles Chart in 1994, when it was covered by Pato Banton featuring Robin and Ali Campbell of the reggae group UB40. The Equals had five further top 40 hits in the UK until the end of 1970.

The Baby Come Back album featured a song by Grant titled "Police on My Back", which was covered by the Clash for their 1980 album Sandinista! Willie Nile also released his version of "Police on My Back" on his Streets of New York CD. The Equals' song "Green Light", co-written by Grant from their 1968 album Supreme, was later covered by the Detroit Cobras for their 2007 album Tied & True.

During his time in the band, Grant worked as a songwriter and producer for other artists, including the Pyramids (producing their debut single "Train Tour to Rainbow City") and Prince Buster, for whom he wrote "Rough Rider". He also started a record label called Torpedo, which released British-made reggae songs.

=== Ice Records ===
On 1 January 1971, Grant suffered a heart attack and collapsed lung, leading to his departure from the Equals to concentrate on production, opening his own Coach House Studios in the grounds of his Stamford Hill home in 1972. He started the record label Ice Records in 1974, with its work initially distributed by Pye Records and later by Virgin Records. He produced the Pioneers' 1976 album Feel the Rhythm, as well as early recordings by his younger brother Rudy, working under the name the Mexicano. He also spent time branching out of music; he learned to tap dance and, at the behest of fellow Guyanese-British actor Norman Beaton, briefly worked as an actor.

=== Solo career ===
A self-titled solo album released in 1975 made little impact, as did the proto-soca album Message Man, completed and released in 1977, on which Grant played all the instruments himself. "Hello Africa", a song from the Message Man album, is considered among the very first soca songs ever recorded. Grant began incorporating elements of rock, pop, soul, calypso, and African music into his sound. His breakthrough as a solo artist came two years later with the album Walking on Sunshine, which spawned the UK top 20 hit "Living on the Frontline". He returned to the charts in 1980 with the top 10 hit "Do You Feel My Love", the opening track of Can't Get Enough, the 1981 album that gave him his first entry in the UK Albums Chart. The album included two further hit singles with "Can't Get Enough of You" and "I Love You, Yes I Love You".

Grant moved to Barbados in 1982 and opened his Blue Wave Studios. Later that year, he released his most successful album, Killer on the Rampage, which included his two biggest solo hits "I Don't Wanna Dance" (which spent three weeks at No. 1 in the UK as well as selling well internationally) and "Electric Avenue" (which reached No. 2 in both the UK and the US). "Electric Avenue" was nominated for a Grammy Award at the 26th Annual Grammy Awards. He also began producing and promoting local artists such as David Rudder, Mighty Gabby, and Grynner. A lean period followed; his 1984 title song for the film Romancing the Stone was cut from the final film and stalled outside the UK top 50 when it was released as a single, although it fared better in the US and Canada. His albums Going for Broke (1984), Born Tuff (1986), and File Under Rock (1988) failed to chart and produced no further hit singles. He participated in Prince Edward's charity television special The Grand Knockout Tournament (1987).

Grant returned to the charts in 1988 with the anti-apartheid single "Gimme Hope Jo'anna", a No. 7 hit in the UK. The song was banned by the South African government. In the late 1980s, he pursued other business interests including music publishing and owning a nightclub, and built up the success of his Blue Wave studio, which was used by The Rolling Stones, Sting, Cliff Richard and Elvis Costello.

Grant continued releasing albums in the 1990s, including Barefoot Soldier (1990), Paintings of the Soul (1992), Soca Baptism (1993) and Hearts and Diamonds (1999). In 1994, he introduced a new genre called ringbang at the Barbados Crop Over festival. He said, "What ringbang seeks to do is envelop all the rhythms that have originated from Africa so that they become one, defying all geographical boundaries." In 2000, he organised the Ringbang Celebration festival in Tobago. In 2001, a remix of "Electric Avenue" reached No. 5 in the UK and an attendant Greatest Hits album reached No. 3 in the UK.

In 2004, Grant created parody of his own song "Gimme Hope Jo'anna" called "Gimme Yop Me Mama", which was used in television adverts for the yoghurt-based drink Yop. On 18 April 2006, he released the album Reparation. The title is a call for restitution for the transatlantic slave trade. There was an 11-year gap before his next album, when he released his 2017 album Plaisance.

In 2008, Grant performed at Nelson Mandela's 90th birthday concert, and also played several dates in the UK, including the Glastonbury Festival. Until 2024, he refused to allow his music on streaming platforms such as Apple Music and Spotify out of protest for how the platforms pay artists. However, in February 2024, his album Killer on the Rampage became available on the aforementioned streaming services again as he wanted to allow his music to reach a wider audience. He has since also made available Walking on Sunshine, Message Man, File Under Rock, Love in Exile and Can't Get Enough as of September 2026.

== Musical style ==
Grant is known for his unique style that blends various Western, African, and Caribbean musical traditions. Grant's music is primarily classified as reggae rock and soca, but his sound has blended various musical elements, such as pop, electro-pop, funk, disco, soul, calypso, ringbang (which he invented), and world music elements such as African polyrhythms and samba.

== Lawsuit against Donald Trump ==
In September 2020, Grant sued U.S. President Donald Trump for unauthorised use of Grant's song "Electric Avenue" in an August 2020 presidential campaign video. Trump posted the video on Twitter where it was viewed more than 13 million times before Twitter took it down after Grant's copyright complaint. Grant's song plays during 40 seconds of the animated 55-second video. Trump unsuccessfully attempted to have the suit dismissed, citing fair use and "absolute presidential immunity". Grant asked for $300,000 in damages.

Trump's attorney told the court that the deposition contained sensitive information about Trump's presidential campaign strategy, and asked that Trump and campaign advisor Dan Scavino's testimony be permanently sealed because it would give an "unwarranted competitive advantage" to his opponents in the 2024 presidential election and because it "could be used against them in other, parallel, litigations unrelated to this matter". On 13 September 2024, the court ruled that fair use policy did not apply to the campaign video and that Trump had to pay Grant damages in an amount to be determined by a jury, as well as Grant's legal fees. Copyright Lately noted that "with liability established, the case will now focus on determining damages".

On 20 November 2024, the court issued an order stating that the two sides had settled the lawsuit and that the case would be discontinued, with no terms of the settlement being made public.

== Personal life ==
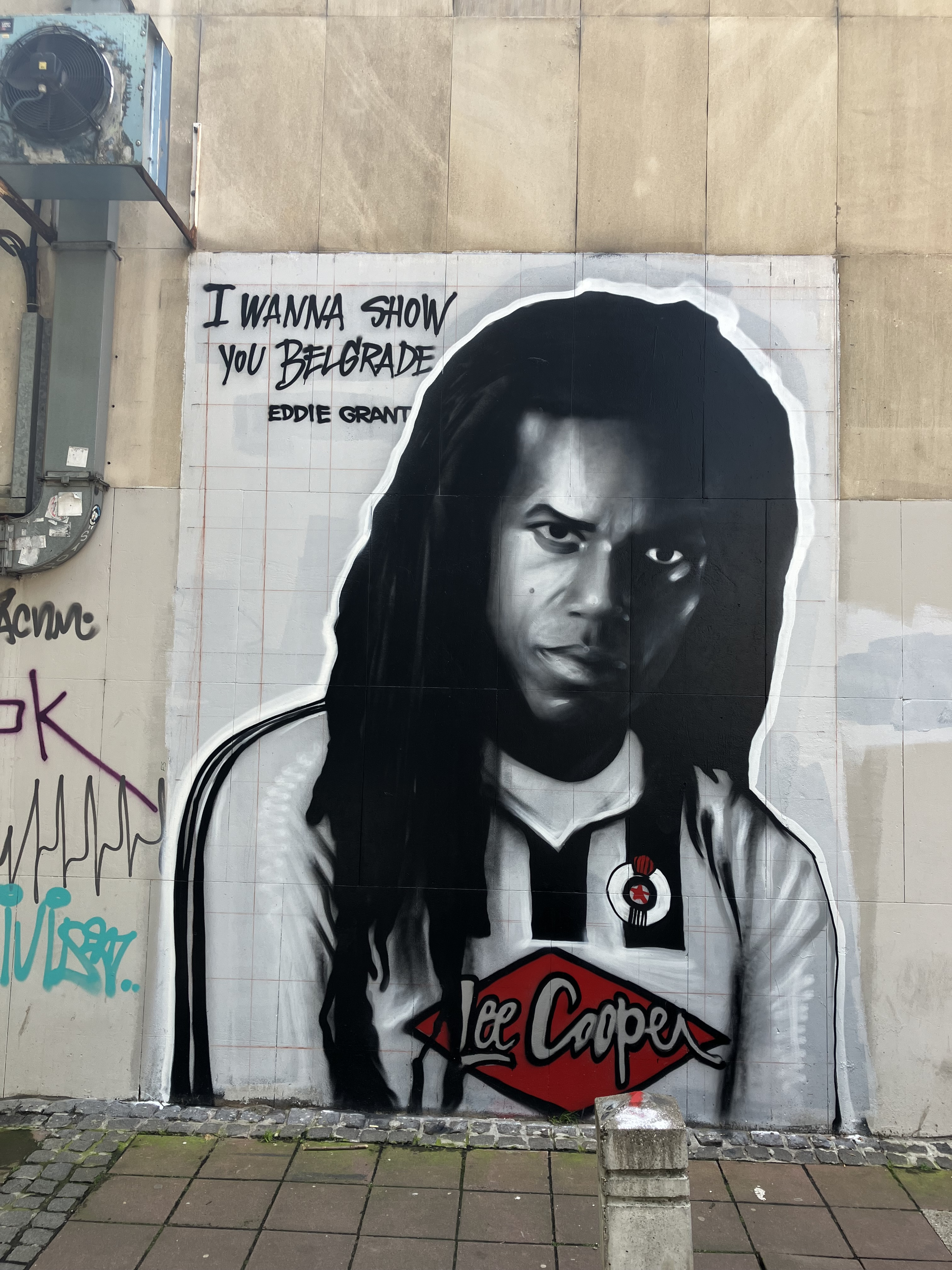
Eddy Grant mural in Belgrade

Grant has lived in Barbados since 1982.

In 2016, it was announced that Grant would receive a Lifetime Achievement Award from the government of Guyana. He had previously been honoured with a postage stamp featuring his likeness and the ringbang logo by the Guyana Post Office Corporation in 2005. In 2018, Grant was bestowed with an honorary doctorate from the University of Guyana. He was then awarded, in February 2020, the Cacique Crown of Honor, by the Guyanese government. On 30 November 2024, Grant also obtained an Honorary Order of Freedom, at Barbados' Kensington Oval.

Grant has advocated for the teaching of calypso music in schools and the establishment of a calypso college in Barbados.

== Discography ==
- Eddy Grant (1975)
- Message Man (1977)
- Walking on Sunshine (1979)
- Love in Exile (1980)
- Can't Get Enough (1981)
- Killer on the Rampage (1982)
- Going for Broke (1984)
- Born Tuff (1986)
- File Under Rock (1988)
- Barefoot Soldier (1990)
- Paintings of the Soul (1992)
- Soca Baptism (1993)
- Hearts and Diamonds (1999)
- Reparation (2006)
- Plaisance (2017)

== Bibliography ==
- Lloyd Bradley, Sounds Like London: 100 Years of Black Music in the Capital (contributor), Serpent's Tail, 2013, ISBN 978-1846687617

== See also ==
- Black British people
- Music of Guyana
- Caribbean music in the United Kingdom
