= Ice Records =

- Founder: Eddy Grant
- Genre: Calypso, soca
- Country of origin: Barbados

Ice Records is a record label based in Barbados owned by musician Eddy Grant. In addition to Grant's music, the label also seeks "to record, promote and market classic calypso, soca and ringbang (Grant's fusion of various Caribbean music forms)." Ice Records lays claim to owning the largest catalog of Caribbean music in the world.

== Artist roster ==
- Black Stalin
- Calypso Rose
- Grynner
- Lord Kitchener
- Mighty Gabby
- Mighty Sparrow
- Roaring Lion
- Square One
- Superblue

== See also ==
- List of record labels
