= Cathy Dennis discography =

- Studio albums: 3
- EPs: 1
- Compilation albums: 2
- Singles: 16
- Video albums: 1
- Music videos: 14

Cathy Dennis is a British singer-songwriter, record producer and actress. She was born on March 25, 1969, in Norwich, England. After a moderately successful international solo career, Dennis later received great success as a writer of pop songs, scoring eight UK number ones and winning five Ivor Novello Awards. Together, her first two albums sold more than 2 million copies worldwide.

== Albums ==
=== Studio albums ===
Title	Album details	Peak chart positions				Certifications
Title	Album details	UK	AUS	CAN	US	Certifications
Move to This	Released: December 1990; Label: Polydor	3	32	44	67	BPI: Gold; MC: Gold
Into the Skyline	Released: September 1992; Label: Polydor	8	135	—	—	
Am I the Kinda Girl?	Released: October 1996; Label: Polydor	78	183	—	—	
"—" denotes items that did not chart or were not released in that territory.

=== Compilation and remix albums ===
Title	Album details
Everybody Move (To the Mixes)	Released: April 1991; Label: Polydor
Move to This - Remix Album	Released: 21 November 1991; Label: Polydor; Japan-exclusive release
The Irresistible Cathy Dennis	Released: September 2000; Label: Spectrum Music

== Singles ==
Year	Title	Peak chart positions										Album
Year	Title	UK	AUS	CAN	GER	IRE	NED	NZ	US	US Adult	US Dance	Album
1989	"C'mon and Get My Love" (with D Mob)	15	35	45	—	16	—	22	10	—	1	Move to This
1989	"Just Another Dream"	93	—	—	—	—	—	—	—	—	—	Move to This
1990	"That's the Way of the World"	48	98	—	—	28	—	35	59	—	1	A Little Bit of This, a Little Bit of That (D Mob album)
1990	"Just Another Dream" (1st re-issue)	95	14	20	—	—	—	—	9	—	2	Move to This
1991	"Touch Me (All Night Long)"	5	16	9	39	3	26	34	2	32	1	Move to This
1991	"Just Another Dream" (2nd re-issue)	13	—	—	47	17	—	38	—	—	—	Move to This
1991	"Too Many Walls"	17	57	10	58	17	—	—	8	1	—	Move to This
1991	"Everybody Move"	25	85	—	—	—	38	—	90	—	41	Move to This
1992	"You Lied to Me"	34	112	46	—	—	—	—	32	—	12	Into the Skyline
1992	"Irresistible"	24	103	23	—	—	—	—	61	6	—	Into the Skyline
1993	"Falling"	32	—	—	—	—	—	—	—	—	—	Into the Skyline
1993	"Moments of Love"	—	—	52	—	—	—	—	—	8	—	Into the Skyline
1994	"Why" (with D:Mob)	23	193	—	—	—	—	—	—	—	—	Into the Skyline
1994	"It's My Style" (Japan only)	—	—	—	—	—	—	—	—	—	—	Into the Skyline
1995	"Love's a Cradle" (Japan only)	—	—	—	—	—	—	—	—	—	—	One voice – The songs of Chage & Aska
1996	"West End Pad"	25	172	—	—	—	—	—	—	—	—	Am I the Kinda Girl?
1997	"Waterloo Sunset"	11	—	—	—	—	—	—	—	—	—	Am I the Kinda Girl?
1997	"When Dreams Turn to Dust"	43	—	—	—	—	—	—	—	—	—	Am I the Kinda Girl?
"—" denotes items that did not chart or were not released in that territory.

== Other appearances ==
These songs have not appeared on a studio album or single released by Dennis.

Year	Title	Album / Single
1991	"Find the Key to Your Life"	Teenage Mutant Ninja Turtles II The Secret of the Ooze: The Original Motion Picture
1993	"Looking Through Patient Eyes"	The Bliss Album... (PM Dawn)
1994	"Marian (Duet Version)"	Robin Hood, Men in Tights OST
1994	"SOS"	Beverly Hills 90210, The College Years
1995	"Temptation For Love"	Ridiculous (Squeeze)
2013	"You Control Me"	Human Feel, Chris Braide feat. Cathy Dennis
2014	"Don't Be Gone Too Long (Album version)	X (Chris Brown)
2014	"Runaway (U & I)"	Pharmacy (Galantis)
2015	"Louder, Harder, Better"	Pharmacy (Galantis)
2018	"Emoji"	Non-album single
2019	"Holy Water"	Church (Galantis)
2020	"Steel"	Church (Galantis)
2020	"Unless It Hurts"	Church (Galantis)
2020	"Stella"	Church (Galantis)
2020	"F**k Tomorrow Now"	Church (Galantis)
2020	"Wild Hearts" (with Will Gregory)	Serengeti (Soundtrack)
2020	"Lost Zebra Song" (with Will Gregory)	Serengeti (Soundtrack)
