= Everybody Move (To the Mixes) =

Remix album by Cathy Dennis
- Released: 1991
- Recorded: 1989–1991
- Genre: Dance-pop
- Length: 58:48
- Label: Polydor
- Producer: Dancin' Danny D; Shep Pettibone; Cathy Dennis; Phil Bodger

Cathy Dennis chronology
Move to This (1990)	Everybody Move (To the Mixes) (1991)	Into the Skyline (1992)

Everybody Move (To the Mixes) is a dance remix album by British singer-songwriter Cathy Dennis, released through Polydor Records in 1991. The album features remixes of the singles from her debut album, Move to This, 1990), some of which had not been commercially available prior to its release. It was also included as the second disc in a special edition of Dennis' 1992 album Into the Skyline.

== Track listing ==
No.	Title	Writer(s)	Producer(s)	Length
1.	"C'mon and Get My Love" (Dance Hall Mix)	Daniel Kojo Poku	Dancin' Danny D	7:36
2.	"Just Another Dream" (12" Mix)	Cathy Dennis; Poku	Dancin' Danny D	6:32
3.	"Everybody Move" (Everybody's House Mix)	Terry Britten; Dennis; Mike Leeson	Shep Pettibone	7:36
4.	"Touch Me (All Night Long)" (Club Mix)	Dennis; Carmichael Gregory; Patrick Adams	Dennis; Phil Bodger; Pettibone	7:17
5.	"Too Many Walls" (L'Autre Mix)	Dennis; Anne Dudley	Dennis; Bodger	4:05
6.	"C'mon and Get My Love" (Spaghetti Western Mix)	Poku		7:50
7.	"Everybody Move" (Club Mix)	Britten; Dennis; Leeson	Dennis; Bodger	8:10
8.	"Just Another Dream" (Funky Love Mix)	Dennis; Poku		9:20
Total length:				58:48
