= Into the Skyline =

Studio album by Cathy Dennis
- Released: 22 September 1992 (North America); 11 January 1993 (UK)
- Recorded: 1992
- Genre: House; pop
- Length: 57:12
- Label: Polydor
- Producer: Shep Pettibone; Cathy Dennis; Dancin' Danny D

Cathy Dennis chronology
Everybody Move (To the Mixes) (1991)	Into the Skyline (1992)	Am I the Kinda Girl? (1996)

Singles from Into the Skyline
- 1. "You Lied to Me" Released: 17 August 1992; 2. "Irresistible" Released: 9 November 1992; 3. "Falling" Released: 25 January 1993; 4. "Moments of Love" Released: 1993; 5. "Why" Released: 31 January 1994; 6. "It's My Style" Released: 1994

Into the Skyline is the second studio album by English singer-songwriter Cathy Dennis, released in September 1992 in North America, and January 1993 in the UK. Written with an aim toward the US market, the album features the singles "You Lied to Me", "Irresistible", "Moments of Love", "Falling", and "Why" – the latter was credited to D Mob with Cathy Dennis. The album peaked at number 8 in the UK Albums Chart, whilst on the US Billboard Hot 100, "You Lied to Me" was a Top 40 hit, and "Irresistible" made the Adult Contemporary top ten; however, the album descended the chart rapidly.

Dennis experienced a brief peak of fame, making a cameo in Beverly Hills, 90210 singing the song "Moments of Love" (a minor US Adult Contemporary chart hit), "Why" (in the episode, without D Mob) and "Touch Me (All Night Long)", a single from her previous album, Move to This. The Japanese edition of Into the Skyline had a second release, which was called Into the Skyline +1, and featured three extra tracks: "Nothing Moves Me", a previous B-side, and "It's My Style" were released as singles.

== Critical reception ==
Professional ratings
Review scores
Source	Rating
AllMusic	2/5 stars
Calgary Herald	C+
Entertainment Weekly	B
The Guardian	(favorable)
NME	5/10
The Philadelphia Inquirer	3/4 stars

David Browne of Entertainment Weekly noted that "You Lied to Me" matches the quality of Cathy Dennis's earlier hits and that the album's ballads approach the melodic refinement of Burt Bacharach. He also praised Dennis for writing and co-producing the album, while pointing out that some lyrics still show a degree of immaturity. In contrast, William Cooper of AllMusic wrote that although Cathy Dennis had previously found success with her catchy, dance-pop debut, the follow-up album failed to match its predecessor. He argued that Into the Skyline tried to replicate the earlier formula but with weaker material, and despite contributions from Dancin' Danny D and producer Shep Pettibone, the album underperformed commercially and produced no major hits.

Nancy Culp of NME argued that Cathy Dennis appeared more like a manufactured image than a confident artist, and that the album's production — from its glam-styled visuals to its heavily double-tracked vocals — felt forced. Culp wrote that Dennis seemed uneasy with adult themes and at times retreated from the album's more mature material. Although she acknowledged a few stronger moments, including "You Lied to Me" and the haunting quality of "Moments in Love", she ultimately described the record as an overproduced pop confection with limited artistic depth.

== Track listing ==
All tracks are written by Cathy Dennis, Shep Pettibone, and Tony Shimkin, except where noted. All tracks are produced by Shep Pettibone and Cathy Dennis, except "Why", produced by Dancin' Danny D.

No.	Title	Writer(s)	Length
1.	"You Lied to Me"		5:27
2.	"Why" (with D Mob)	Dennis; Danny Poku	4:54
3.	"Falling"		4:39
4.	"Moments of Love"	Dennis; Terry Britten	3:56
5.	"Being With You"	Dennis	4:21
6.	"For Your Love"		4:06
7.	"Irresistible"		3:48
8.	"We've Got to Fight"		4:18
9.	"Change Will Come"	Dennis	3:37
10.	"Our True Emotions"	Dennis	5:23
11.	"Everybody Get Up"	Dennis	3:43
12.	"You Lied to Me" (Sprayed with Shep's Attitude Mix)		4:07
Total length:			57:12

Japanese edition
No.	Title	Length
12.	"One Life"	4:37
13.	"Nothing Moves Me"	4:33
14.	"You Lied to Me" (Sprayed with Shep's Attitude Mix)	4:07

Japanese reissue: Into the Skyline + 1
No.	Title	Writer(s)	Length
15.	"It's My Style"	Dennis	3:51
Total length:			65:27

UK limited edition CD2: Move to This: The Album Remixes
No.	Title	Writer(s)	Producer(s)	Length
1.	"C'mon and Get My Love" (Dance Hall Mix)	D Mob	Dancin' Danny D	7:36
2.	"Just Another Dream" (12" Mix)	Dennis; D Mob	Dancin' Danny D	6:32
3.	"Everybody Move" (Everybody's House Mix)	Dennis; Anne Dudley	Pettibone	7:36
4.	"Touch Me (All Night Long)" (Club Mix)	Dennis; Greg Carmichael; Patrick Adams	Dennis; Phil Bodger; Pettibone	7:17
5.	"Too Many Walls" (L'Autre Mix)	Dennis; Dudley	Dennis; Bodger	4:05
6.	"C'mon and Get My Love" (Spaghetti Western Mix)	D Mob	Dancin' Danny D	7:50
7.	"Everybody Move" (Club Mix)	Dennis; Dudley	Dennis; Bodger	8:10
8.	"Just Another Dream" (Funky Love Mix)	Cathy Dennis, D Mob	Dancin' Danny D	9:20
Total length:				58:48

== Personnel ==
- Cathy Dennis – backing vocals on tracks 1, 6, 7, 8 and 12; keyboards on tracks 4, 5, 9 to 11
- Shep Pettibone – keyboard and programming

=== Additional personnel ===
- Cindy Mizelle – backing vocals on tracks 1, 6, 7 and 12
- Craig Derry – backing vocals on tracks 1, 6, 7 and 12
- Roberta Gilliam – backing vocals on tracks 1, 6 and 12
- Sonset – backing vocals on tracks 2, 9 and 11
- Robin Hancock – engineer on tracks 4, 5, 9, 10 and 11
- Alan Jenkins – assistant engineer on tracks 4, 5, 9 to 11
- Alan Gregorie – mixing engineer on tracks 4 to 6
- Bonzai Jim Caruso – mixing engineer on tracks 1, 8 and 12
- P. Dennis Mitchell – recording engineer on tracks 1, 3, 6, 7, 8 and 12
- Paul Gendler – guitar on tracks 4, 5, 9 and 10
- Terry Burrus – keyboards on tracks 1, 6 and 12
- Zanna – photography
- Mixing – Cathy Dennis (tracks 7, 9 to 11), Shep Pettibone (tracks 1 to 4)
- Programming, keyboards – Scott Davidson (tracks 5, 9 to 11)
- Sequencing, keyboards, programming – Shep Pettibone (tracks 1, 3, 6 to 8, 12), Tony Shimkin (tracks 1, 3, 6 to 8, 12)

== Charts ==
Chart (1993)	Peak position
Australia (ARIA)	135
European Top 100 Albums (Music & Media)	79
UK Albums (OCC)	8
