= When Dreams Turn to Dust =

Single by Cathy Dennis

from the album Am I the Kinda Girl?
- Released: 1997
- Label: Polydor
- Songwriter(s): Guy Chambers; Cathy Dennis

Cathy Dennis singles chronology
"Waterloo Sunset" (1997)	"When Dreams Turn to Dust" (1997)

"When Dreams Turn to Dust" is a 1997 single by British dance-pop singer-songwriter Cathy Dennis. The song was the final single from her third album, Am I the Kinda Girl? (1996), and the last to be released by Dennis. The single was only released in the UK and reached No. 43 in June 1997. The accompanying music video featured a then unknown Vernon Kay.

== Critical reception ==
British magazine Music Week rated the song four out of five, writing, "Following up Waterloo Sunset was never going to be easy, but Dennis pulls it off with this simple yet charming song penned with Guy Chambers."

== Track listings ==
- UK CD 1 single
1. When Dreams Turn To Dust (Radio Edit) – 3:37
2. Fade Away (Non-LP B-Side) – 3:48
3. Roller Coaster (Non-LP B-Side) – 4:16
4. Falling (Re-recorded version with new vocals) – 3:59
- UK CD 2 single
1. When Dreams Turn To Dust (Radio Edit) – 3:37
2. Touch Me (All Night Long)
3. Just Another Dream
4. Too Many Walls

== Charts ==
Weekly chart for "When Dreams Turn to Dust"
Chart (1996)	Peak position
UK Singles (OCC)	43
