= Now That's What I Call 80s Dance =

Compilation album by Various Artists
- Released: 11 October 2013
- Recorded: 1980–1989
- Genre: Pop, dance
- Label: Sony Music Entertainment, EMI, Virgin Music Group, UMG, Warner Music Group

Various Artists chronology
Now That's What I Call Disco (2013)	Now That's What I Call 80s Dance (2013)	Now That's What I Call Music! USA (2013)

Now That's What I Call 80s Dance or Now 80s Dance is a triple-disc compilation album which was released in the United Kingdom on 14 October 2013. It includes nearly 60 of the biggest dance anthems of the 1980s era.

== Track listing ==
=== CD 1 ===
1. Black Box – Ride on Time
2. S'Express – Theme from S-Express
3. Yazz & the Plastic Population – The Only Way is Up
4. MARRS – Pump Up the Volume
5. Technotronic – Pump Up the Jam
6. Coldcut feat. Lisa Stansfield – People Hold On
7. Steve "Silk" Hurley – Jack Your Body
8. Miami Sound Machine – Doctor Beat
9. Beatmasters feat. Betty Boo – Hey DJ / I Can't Dance to That Music You're Playing
10. Farley Jackmaster Funk & Jesse Saunders feat. Darryl Pandy – Love Can't Turn Around
11. Bomb the Bass – Beat Dis
12. Coldcut feat. Yazz & the Plastic Population – Doctorin' the House
13. Mantronix – Got to Have Your Love
14. Afrika Bambaataa & The Soulsonic Force – Don't Stop... Planet Rock
15. Malcolm McLaren – Double Dutch
16. Rock Steady Crew – (Hey You) The Rock Steady Crew
17. Salt-n-Pepa – Push It
18. Neneh Cherry – Buffalo Stance
19. Stakker – Stakker Humanoid
20. D-Mob feat. Gary Haisman – We Call It Acieed

=== CD 2 ===
1. Frankie Goes to Hollywood – Relax
2. Soft Cell – Tainted Love
3. Heaven 17 – Temptation
4. Spandau Ballet – Chant No. 1 (I Don't Need This Pressure On)
5. The Human League – Love Action (I Believe in Love)
6. Dead or Alive – You Spin Me Round (Like a Record)
7. Erasure – A Little Respect
8. Communards & Sarah Jane Morris – Don't Leave Me This Way
9. Wham! – Wake Me Up Before You Go-Go
10. Rick Astley – Never Gonna Give You Up
11. Blondie – Rapture
12. Grace Jones – Pull Up to the Bumper
13. Kid Creole and the Coconuts – Annie, I'm Not Your Daddy
14. The Weather Girls – It's Raining Men
15. Was (Not Was) – Walk the Dinosaur
16. Kylie Minogue – The Loco-Motion
17. Mel & Kim – Respectable
18. Kelly Marie – Feels Like I'm in Love
19. Sinitta – So Macho
20. Taylor Dayne – Tell It to My Heart

=== CD 3 ===
1. Soul II Soul – Back to Life (However Do You Want Me)
2. Inner City – Good Life
3. Womack & Womack – Teardrops
4. Chaka Khan – I Feel for You
5. Bobby Brown – My Prerogative
6. Cameo – Word Up!
7. Freeez – I.O.U
8. Colonel Abrams – Trapped
9. Gwen Guthrie – Ain't Nothin' Goin' on But the Rent
10. Luther Vandross – Never Too Much
11. Alexander O'Neal – Criticize
12. Deniece Williams – Let's Hear It for the Boy
13. Jermaine Jackson – Let's Get Serious
14. Earth, Wind & Fire – Let's Groove
15. Odyssey – Use It Up and Wear It Out
16. The Pasadenas – Tribute (Right On)
17. Terence Trent D'Arby – Dance Little Sister
18. Paula Abdul – Straight Up
19. Indeep – Last Night a D.J. Saved My Life

== Charts ==
Chart (2013)	Peak Position
UK Compilations Chart	1
UK Download Albums Chart	16

== Release history ==
Country	Release date
Ireland	11 October 2013
United Kingdom	14 October 2013
