= Shep Pettibone =

American record producer and songwriter

- Born: Robert E. Pettibone, Jr. July 10, 1959 (age 67); Ocean Grove, New Jersey, U.S.
- Genres: House; dance-pop
- Occupations: DJ; record producer; remixer
- Years active: 1980s–present

Robert "Shep" Pettibone (born July 10, 1959) is an American record producer, remixer, songwriter and club DJ, one of the most prolific of the 1980s.

== Career ==
Shep Pettibone surfaced in 1981 after his work with Arthur Baker on Afrika Bambaataa & the Jazzy 5's "Jazzy Sensation" and as an in-house mix engineer for Prelude Records. During his recording career, he launched innovative "mastermixes" for New York's KISS FM. The popularity of these mixes persuaded Prelude Records to release some of them commercially.

Pettibone built his brand through a personal approach to remixing tracks that were specially crafted for the dancefloor. Acclaimed by DJs worldwide, he became a "go-to" figure for labels and artists seeking to achieve both club and chart success. His production and mixing prowess led him to work with such artists as Madonna, George Michael, Janet Jackson, Pet Shop Boys, and New Order in the late 1980s. His influence remains perceivable in contemporary music.

The works of Pettibone, Arthur Baker and [John] Luongo pushed the boundaries of dance music even further than the '70s disco boom; they delivered cutting-edge studio wizardry and club sensibility to mainstream pop and even rock acts, injecting the airwaves with style and craft that elicits deep nostalgia for those who bought 7″ and 12″ singles in this era.

— Mike Duquette, The Second Disc

Pettibone is the subject of the first volume of the Arthur Baker Presents Dance Masters series, Shep Pettibone: The Classic 12" Master-Mixes, a 47-song box set with highlights from his career.

== The "Vogue" case ==
Pettibone, co-writer and co-producer of Madonna's 1990 hit "Vogue", sued Warner Music in a dispute over withholding royalty payments. An appeals court ruled that the music producer was not responsible for paying the publishing giant's legal fees in a previous case.

== Discography ==
=== Selected credits ===
The following is a list of productions, writing, and remixes by Shep Pettibone.

Artist	Title	Year	Role
Aftershock	"She Loves Me, She Loves Me Not"	1990	Remix
Afrika Bambaataa & the Jazz 5	"Jazzy Sensation"	1982	Remix
Alisha	"All Night Passion"	1985	Remix
Alisha	"Baby Talk"	1985	Remix
Alisha	"Boys Will Be Boys"	1985	Remix
Alisha	"One Little Lie"	1985	Remix
Alisha	"Too Turned On"	1985	Remix
Alisha	"Stargazing"	1986	Remix
Alyson Williams	"Yes We Can"	1986	Remix
Arnie's Love	"Date with the Rain"	1985	Remix
Apollo Smile	"Dune Buggy"	1991	Remix
Arcadia	"Say the Word"	1985	Remix
Art of Noise	"Beat Box"	1984	Remix
Aurra	"Baby Love"	1982	Remix
Aurra	"Checking You Out"	1982	Remix
Aurra	"Such a Feeling"	1982	Remix
The B-52's	"Summer of Love"	1986	Remix
The B-52's	"The Girl from Ipanema Goes to Greenland"	1986	Remix
Bananarama	"Preacher Man"	1991	Remix
Bang	"Holding My Heart"	1990	Remix
Barbara Fowler	"Knockin' on My Door"	1985	Remix
Barone	"Shake It Up ('Til Ya Drop)"	1985	Remix
BB&Q Band	"Dreamer"	1984	Remix
Bee Gees	"You Win Again"	1988	Remix
Belinda Carlisle	"Heaven Is a Place on Earth"	1988	Remix
Belinda Carlisle	"I Get Weak"	1988	Remix
The Belle Stars	"World Domination"	1986	Remix
Betty Boo	"Doin' the Do"	1990	Remix
Betty Boo	"Where Are You Baby"	1990	Remix
Bianca	"My Emotions"	1989	Remix
Bobby "O" & His Banana Republic	"Somebody"	1985	Remix
Boogie Box High	"Nervous"	1989	Remix
Boys Don't Cry	"Cities on Fire"	1986	Remix
Breakfast Club	"Express Away to Your Heart"	1988	Remix
Breakfast Club	"Never Be the Same"	1987	Remix
Bros	"Drop the Boy"	1988	Remix
Bros	"I Owe You Nothing"	1988	Remix
Candido	"Jingo"	1983	Remix
Carl Bean	"I Was Born This Way"	1986	Remix
Carol Jiani	"Touch and Go Lover"	1984	Remix
Carol Williams	"No One Can Do It (Like You)"	1981	Remix
Casanova	"Eye Contact"	1983	Remix
Cathy Dennis	"Everybody Move"	1991	Remix
Cathy Dennis	Everybody Move (To the Mixes)	1991	Production
Cathy Dennis	"Just Another Dream"	1991	Remix
Cathy Dennis	"Touch Me (All Night Long)"	1991	Remix
Cathy Dennis	"You Lied to Me"	1992	Remix
Cathy Dennis	Into the Skyline	1992	Production
Cathy Dennis	The Irresistible Cathy Dennis	2000	Production
Cat Miller	"Ready or Not"	1985	Remix
Cheri	"So Sure"	1983	Remix
Cheri	"Working Girl"	1983	Remix
Clair Hicks and Love Exchange	"Push (In the Bush)"	1984	Remix
Claudja Barry	"Down and Counting"	1986	Remix
Colors	"Am I Gonna Be the One"	1983	Remix
The Communards	"Never Can Say Goodbye"	1987	Remix
Conquest	"Give It to Me (If You Don't Mind)"	1982	Remix
Cyndi Lauper	"Change of Heart"	1986	Remix
Cyndi Lauper	"What's Going On"	1987	Remix
Daryl Hall	"Foolish Pride"	1986	Remix
Daryl Hall & John Oates	"Everything Your Heart Desires"	1988	Remix
David Bowie	"Day-In Day-Out"	1987	Remix
David Essex	"Rock On"	1989	Remix
David McPherson	"You Can't Stop"	1982	Remix
Debbie Gibson	"Electric Youth"	1989	Remix
Debbie Harry	"Heart of Glass" (re-recorded solo version)	1988	Remix
Depeche Mode	"Behind the Wheel"	1987	Remix
Diana Ross	"Paradise"	1989	Remix
Diana Ross	"Shock Waves"	1987	Remix
Donna Garraffa	"Let Me Be Your Fantasy"	1985	Remix
D-Train	"Keep On"	1982	Remix
D-Train	"You're the One for Me"	1981	Remix
Duran Duran	"All She Wants Is"	1988	Remix
Duran Duran	"I Don't Want Your Love"	1988	Remix
Dusty Springfield	"In Private"	1989	Remix
Dusty Springfield	"Reputation"	1989	Remix
Eleanor	"Adventure"	1988	Remix
Elton John	"I Don't Wanna Go on with You Like That"	1988	Remix
Elton John	"Healing Hands"	1989	Remix
Empress	"Dyin' to Be Dancin'"	1982	Remix
Erasure	"Blue Savannah"	1989	Remix
Erasure	"Chains of Love"	1988	Remix
Falco	"Do It Again"	1988	Remix
First Choice	"Dr. Love"	1983	Remix
First Choice	"Let No Man Put Asunder"	1983	Remix
Five Star	"Are You Man Enough"	1987	Remix
Five Star	"The Slightest Touch"	1987	Remix
Five Star	"Somewhere Somebody"	1987	Remix
Five Star	"Treat Me Like a Lady"	1990	Remix
Five Star	"Find the Time"	1986	Remix
Five Star	"If I Say Yes"	1986	Remix
The Flirts	"You & Me"	1985	Remix
The Flirts	"New Toy"	1986	Remix
Four in Legion	"Party in My Pants"	1984	Remix
Fox the Fox	"Precious Little Diamond"	1984	Remix
France Joli	"Does He Dance"	1985	Remix
France Joli	"Gonna Get Over You"	1982	Remix
France Joli	"I Wanna Take a chance on Love"	1982	Remix
Gary Barlow	"Love Won't Wait"	1997	Production
Gayle Adams	"Love Fever"	1982	Remix
George Benson	"Twice the Love"	1988	Remix
George Michael	"Hard Day"	1987	Remix
Gloria Gaynor	"I Am What I Am"	1983	Remix
Gloria Gaynor	"I Will Survive"	1990	Remix
Howard Hewett	"Stay"	1986	Remix
Huey Lewis & the News	"Hip to Be Square"	1986	Remix
Information Society	"Walking Away"	1988	Remix
Inner Life	"I Like It Like That"	1982	Remix
Inner Life	"Moment of My Life"	1982	Remix
Instant Funk	"(Just Because) You'll Be Mine"	1986	Remix
Jaki Graham	"From Now On"	1989	Remix
The Jammers	"And You Know That"	1982	Remix
The Jammers	"Be Mine Tonight"	1982	Remix
The Jammers	"Let's B-B Break"	1984	Remix
Jane Child	"Don't Wanna Fall in Love"	1989	Remix
Janet Jackson	"Alright" (featuring Heavy D)	1990	Remix
Janet Jackson	"Escapade"	1990	Remix
Janet Jackson	"Love Will Never Do (Without You)"	1989	Remix
Janet Jackson	"Miss You Much"	1989	Remix
Janet Jackson	"Rhythm Nation"	1989	Remix
Janet Jackson	"State of the World"	1989	Remix
Janet Jackson	"The Pleasure Principle"	1987	Remix
Jeannette "Lady" Day	"Come Let Me Love You"	1982	Remix
Jeffrey Osborne	"Room with a View"	1986	Remix
Jennifer Holliday	"No Frills Love"	1985	Remix
Jennifer Lopez	"First Love"	2014	Remix
Jermaine Jackson	"I Think It's Love"	1982	Remix
The Jets	"Cross My Broken Heart"	1987	Remix
Junk Yard Dog	"Grab Them Cakes"	1985	Remix
Karyn White	"Romantic"	1991	Remix
Katunga	"El Negro No Puede"	1984	Remix
Keyna	"Tell It to Me"	1989	Remix
Kim Wilde	"You Came"	1988	Remix
Laid Back	"I'm Hooked"	1985	Remix
Laid Back	"It's the Way You Do It"	1985	Remix
Laid Back	"One Life"	1985	Remix
Labelle	"Turn It Out"	1995	Production
Labelle	"Turn It Out"	2000	Remix
The Latin Rascals	"Don't Let Me Be Misunderstood"	1988	Remix
Level 42	"Lessons in Love"	1987	Remix
Level 42	"Something About You"	1985	Remix
Level 42	"World Machine"	1985	Remix
Leroy Burgess	"Heartbreaker"	1983	Remix
Leroy Burgess	"Stranger"	1983	Remix
Linda Taylor	"You and Me Just Started"	1982	Remix
Lionel Richie	"Love Will Conquer All"	1986	Remix
Lisa Lisa and Cult Jam	"I Wonder If I Take You Home"	1985	Remix
Lisa Stansfield	"This Is the Right Time"	1990	Remix
Loleatta Holloway	"Crash Goes Love"	1986	Remix
Loleatta Holloway	"Love Sensation"	1983	Remix
Louie Louie	"Sittin' in the Lap of Luxury"	1990	Remix
Love and Money	"Candy Bar Express"	1986	Remix
Luther Vandross	"Power of Love/Love Power"	1991	Remix
Madonna	"True Blue"	1986	Remix
Madonna	"Where's the Party"	1986	Remix
Madonna	"Causing a Commotion"	1987	Remix
Madonna	"Express Yourself"	1989	Remix
Madonna	"Like a Prayer"	1989	Remix
Madonna	"Keep It Together"	1990	Remix
Madonna	"Vogue"	1990	Remix
Madonna	I'm Breathless	1990	Production
Madonna	The Immaculate Collection	1990	Production
Madonna	"Rescue Me"	1991	Remix
Madonna	"Deeper and Deeper"	1992	Remix
Madonna	"Erotica"	1992	Writing / Remix
Madonna	Erotica	1992	Writing / Production
Madonna	"In This Life"	1992	Writing / Remix
Madonna	"Thief of Hearts"	1992	Writing / Remix
Madonna	"This Used to Be My Playground"	1992	Writing / Remix
Madonna	"Why's It So Hard"	1992	Writing / Remix
Madonna	"Words"	1992	Writing / Remix
Madonna	"Bad Girl"	1993	Writing / Remix
Madonna	"Bye Bye Baby"	1993	Writing / Remix
Madonna	"Fever"	1993	Remix
Madonna	"Rain"	1993	Writing / Remix
Mahogany	"Ride on the Rhythm"	1983	Remix
Mariah Carey	"Someday"	1991	Remix
Mariah Carey	"There's Got to Be a Way"	1991	Remix
MC Hammer	"Pray"	1990	Remix
Metallica	"Enter Sandman"	1991	Remix
Miami Sound Machine	"Bad Boy"	1986	Remix
Michael Bolton	"Can I Touch You... There?"	1995	Remix
Michael McDonald	"All We Got (It's Not Enough, Never Enough)"	1990	Remix
Mico Wave	"Star Search"	1987	Remix
Mike & Brenda Sutton	"Don't Let Go of Me (Grip My Hips & Move Me)"	1982	Remix
Mitsou	"Bye Bye Mon Cowboy"	1988	Remix
Morris Day	"Are You Ready"	1988	Remix
Natalie Cole	"The Urge to Merge"	1987	Remix
Narada	"Divine Emotions"	1988	Remix
New Order	"Bizarre Love Triangle"	1986	Remix
New Order	"True Faith"	1987	Remix
Nia Peeples	"Street of Dreams"	1991	Remix
Nia Peeples	"Trouble"	1988	Remix
Nick Kamen	"Each Time You Break My Heart"	1986	Remix
Nick Scotti	"Get Over"	1993	Remix
The Nick Straker Band	"A Little Bit of Jazz"	1982	Remix
Nu Shooz	"Don't Let Me Be the One"	1986	Remix
Nu Shooz	"Lost Your Number"	1986	Remix
Nu Shooz	"Point of No Return"	1986	Remix
NV	"It's Alright"	1983	Remix
NV	"Let Me Do You"	1984	Remix
Olivia Newton-John	"The Rumour"	1988	Remix
Paul McCartney	"Où est le soleil?"	1989	Remix
Paula Abdul	"Forever Your Girl"	1990	Remix
Paula Abdul	"Knocked Out"	1990	Remix
Paula Abdul	"Opposites Attract"	1990	Remix
Paul Lekakis	"Tattoo on Me"	1990	Remix
Paul Lekakis	"You Blow Me Away"	1989	Remix
Pebbles	"Giving You the Benefit"	1990	Remix
Pet Shop Boys	"Love Comes Quickly"	1986	Remix
Pet Shop Boys	"Opportunities (Let's Make Lots of Money)"	1986	Remix
Pet Shop Boys	"Was That What It Was?"	1986	Remix
Pet Shop Boys	"I Want to Wake Up"	1987	Production / Remix
Pet Shop Boys	"You Know Where You Went Wrong"	1987	Production / Remix
Pet Shop Boys	"What Have I Done to Deserve This?"	1987	Remix
Pet Shop Boys	"Always on My Mind"	1988	Remix
Pet Shop Boys	"Heart"	1988	Remix
Pet Shop Boys	"Left to My Own Devices"	1988	Remix
Pet Shop Boys	"West End Girls"	1988	Remix
Pet Shop Boys	"Heart"	2001	Production
Phil Collins	"Hang in Long Enough"	1990	Remix
Phyllis Nelson	"I Like You"	1985	Remix
Pia Zadora	"Dance Out of My Head"	1988	Remix
Pierre	"Just Right"	1984	Remix
Pilot	"You Are the One"	1984	Remix
Pointer Sisters	"Friends' Advice (Don't Take It)"	1990	Remix
Pointer Sisters	"Goldmine"	1986	Remix
Pretty Poison	"Nighttime"	1988	Remix
Prince	"Hot Thing"	1987	Remix
Prince	"Glam Slam"	1988	Remix
Prince	"Strange Relationship"	2020	Remix
Psychedelic Furs	"Shock"	1989	Remix
Rafael Cameron	"Desires"	1982	Remix
Ramsey Lewis	"This Ain't No Fantasy"	1985	Remix
Raw Silk	"Do It to the Music"	1983	Remix
Redhead Kingpin and the F.B.I.	"Get It Together"	1991	Remix
Robey	"Bored & Beautiful"	1984	Remix
Robey	"One Night in Bangkok"	1984	Remix
Robey	"Killer Instinct"	1985	Remix
Rockers Revenge	"Walking on Sunshine"	1987	Remix
Run-D.M.C.	"Ghostbusters"	1989	Remix
Run-D.M.C.	"It's Tricky"	1987	Remix
The Salsoul Orchestra	"Ooh, I Love It (Love Break)"	1983	Remix
The Salsoul Orchestra	"Seconds"	1982	Remix
S'Express	"Hey Music Lover"	1988	Remix
Seal	"The Beginning"	1991	Remix
Secret Weapon	"Must Be the Music"	1982	Remix
Shakespears Sister	"Break My Heart"	1988	Remix
Sharon Redd	"Can You Handle It"	1982	Remix
Sheena Easton	"Eternity"	1987	Remix
Shirley Lewis	"You Can't Hide"	1989	Remix
Siedah Garrett	"K.I.S.S.I.N.G."	1988	Remix
Sinnamon	"Thin Line"	1984	Remix
Sinnamon	"He's Gonna Take You Home"	1982	Remix
Sinnamon	"Thanks to You"	1982	Remix
Sister Sledge	"Here to Stay"	1986	Remix
Skyy	"Call Me"	1982	Remix
Skyy	"Let Love Shine"	1982	Remix
Skyy	"Let's Celebrate"	1982	Remix
Skyy	"Show Me the Way"	1987	Remix
Slade	"Slam the Hammer Down"	1984	Remix
Slay Cabell	"Feelin' Fine"	1982	Remix
Stacey Q	"Don't Make a Fool of Yourself"	1988	Remix
The Springsteen Brothers	"She's Fine"	1984	Remix
Steve Shelto	"Don't You Give Your Love Away"	1983	Remix
Stewart Copeland	"Love Lessons"	1987	Remix
The Strangers	"Step Out of My Dream"	1983	Remix
The Strikers	"Body Music"	1982	Remix
Surface	"Falling in Love"	1983	Remix
Taylor Dayne	"I'll Wait"	1993	Remix
Taylor Dayne	Soul Dancing	1993	Production
Taylor Dayne	"Say a Prayer"	1995	Remix
Taylor Dayne	Greatest Hits	1995	Production
Taylor Dayne	Dance Diva: Remixes & Rarities	2005	Production
Technotronic	"Techno Medley"	1990	Remix
Terence Trent D'Arby	"Dance Little Sister"	1987	Remix
Terence Trent D'Arby	"If You Let Me Stay"	1987	Remix
Terry Lewis	"Can You Feel It"	1984	Remix
Third World	"One to One"	1985	Remix
Third World	"Sense of Purpose"	1985	Remix
Thompson Twins	"In the Name of Love"	1988	Remix
Thompson Twins	"Sugar Daddy"	1989	Remix
Timex Social Club	"Rumors"	1986	Remix
Timex Social Club	"Thinkin' About Ya"	1986	Remix
Tina Turner	"Foreign Affair"	1989	Remix
TKA	"I Won't Give Up on You"	1989	Remix
Toney Lee	"Reach Up"	1986	Remix
Tracie Spencer	"This Time Make It Funky"	1990	Remix
2 Brave	"After Midnight"	1989	Remix
Unlimited Touch	"Reach Out (Everlasting Lover)"	1984	Remix
Unlimited Touch	"Searching to Find the One"	1982	Remix
Unique	"You Make Me Feel So Good"	1984	Remix
Vaughan & Butch Dayo Mason	"Party on the Corner"	1983	Remix
Vaughan & Butch Dayo Mason	"You Can Do It"	1982	Remix
Visual	"The Music Got Me"	1985	Remix
The Wally Jump Jr. & the Criminal Element	"Don't Push Your Luck"	1986	Remix
The Wally Jump Jr. & the Criminal Element	"Jump Back"	1986	Remix
Wang Chung	"Let's Go!"	1986	Remix
Warp 9	"Light Years Away"	1983	Remix
Weeks & Co.	"Going Out of My Dream"	1983	Remix
Weeks & Co.	"Good to the Last Drop"	1983	Remix
Weeks & Co.	"If You're Looking for Fun"	1983	Remix
Weeks & Co.	"Knock, Knock"	1983	Remix
Weeks & Co.	"Rock Candy"	1983	Remix
Weeks & Co.	"Rockin' It in the Pocket"	1983	Remix
Weeks & Co.	"Rock Your World"	1983	Remix
Weeks & Co.	"Tunnel of Love"	1983	Remix
Weeks & Co.	"Your Next Door Neighbor"	1983	Remix
Wild Party	"No One Knows"	1987	Remix
Will to Power	"Fading Away"	1988	Remix
The Wrestlers	"Land of a Thousand Dances?!!?"	1985	Remix
Whitney Houston	"I Belong to You"	1991	Remix
Whitney Houston	"So Emotional"	1987	Remix

== See also ==
- Club Zanzibar
- The Empress Hotel
- Paradise (nightclub)
