= Move to This =

Studio album by Cathy Dennis
- Released: 22 October 1990
- Recorded: 1989–1990
- Genres: Pop; dance-pop
- Length: 42:10
- Label: Polydor
- Producers: Cathy Dennis; Dancin' Danny D; Phil Bodger; Nile Rodgers; Shep Pettibone

Cathy Dennis chronology
Move to This (1990)	Everybody Move (To the Mixes) (1991)

Singles from Move to This
- 1. "C'mon and Get My Love" Released: 2 October 1989; 2. "Just Another Dream" Released: 6 November 1989; 3. "All Night Long (Touch Me)" Released: 14 January 1991; 4. "Too Many Walls" Released: 23 September 1991; 5. "Everybody Move" Released: 25 November 1991

Move to This is the debut studio album by British singer-songwriter Cathy Dennis. It was released on 22 October 1990 through Polydor Records. Dennis was discovered by her manager Simon Fuller in 1986, and worked on the record for three years with Daniel Poku. Together they released the single "C'mon and Get My Love" in 1989, which jump started her career.

A dance-pop record, Move to This was primarily produced by Dennis with Phil Bodger, and features contributions by Poku and Nile Rodgers. Two of its tracks, "Just Another Dream" and "All Night Long (Touch Me)", were remixed for single release by Shep Pettibone.

Move to This peaked at number three on the Official Albums Chart in the United Kingdom, where it was certified gold. Despite four of its five singles reaching top ten on the Billboard Hot 100, the album was only a minor success, stalling at number 67 on the Top Pop Albums chart in the United States.

== Promotion ==
Polydor promoted Move to This in Italy with appearances at the San Remo International Festival and on television, alongside radio airplay prior to its national release. A coordinated TV and radio campaign supported the album, and the single "All Night Long (Touch Me)" entered the Sorrisi e Canzoni Top 50 singles chart. According to Music & Media, the singer received significant radio support in Italy for her singles, and while her domestic sales were modest, her exposure led to the formation of a fan club and helped establish her presence in the Italian market ahead of her second album Into the Skyline.

== Singles ==
Move to This spawned five singles which were spread out over a period of two years. The first single, "C'mon and Get My Love", which also appeared on the D Mob album A Little Bit of This, a Little Bit of That and was credited to either D Mob or "D Mob introducing Cathy Dennis", was released in 1989. It peaked at number 15 on the UK Singles Chart, number 35 on Australia's ARIA Charts, number one on Billboard's Dance Club Songs chart, and number 10 on the Billboard Hot 100 in the U.S.

"Just Another Dream" was released as the second single in 1989. The initial release peaked at number 93 on the UK Singles Chart. It was re-released twice, first in 1990, and again in 1991. The first reissue only made it to number 95 on the UK chart, but reached number 9 on the Billboard Hot 100 in the U.S. The second reissue performed much better, peaking at number 13 in the UK, number 2 on the U.S. Dance Club Songs chart, and number 14 on the ARIA Charts, becoming Dennis' best chart performance in Australia.

The third single was "Touch Me (All Night Long)", a lyrical reworking of the 1984 song by Fonda Rae. Released in 1991, the single became Dennis' most successful to date. It hit number one on the U.S. Dance Club Songs chart and peaked at number 2 on the Billboard Hot 100 chart. The single also reached number 5 in the UK and number 16 in Australia.

"Too Many Walls" was the fourth single, hitting number 1 on the Billboard Adult Contemporary chart and peaking at number 8 on the Billboard Hot 100 chart. It also reached number 17 in the UK and number 57 in Australia.

"Everybody Move" was the final single, reaching number 40 on the U.S. Dance Club Songs chart and stalling at number 90 on the Billboard Hot 100 chart. The single also reached number 25 in the UK.

== Critical reception ==
Professional ratings
Review scores
Source	Rating
AllMusic	4.5/5 stars
Chicago Tribune	3/4 stars
Encyclopedia of Popular Music	3/5 stars
Entertainment Weekly	B+
NME	6/10
Teen Ink	(mixed)
The Vancouver Sun	3.5/5 stars

According to critic Alex Henderson from AllMusic, the album shows more strengths than weaknesses, presenting Cathy Dennis as an interesting addition to the British R&B scene of the 1990s. In his view, even without a wide vocal range, she stands out for her charisma and warm delivery on danceable and infectious tracks, which mark the album's strongest moments. However, Henderson points out that the record loses impact on the adult contemporary-style ballads, which he considers uninspired. Still, he concludes that the work reinforces England's relevance in the dance music scene of that period.

Betty Page of NME points out Dennis determination in collaborating with major names such as Nile Rodgers, Shep Pettibone, and Danny D, along with renowned American songwriters. According to the review, the album strikes a balance between upbeat pop-dance tracks and smoother ballads, though the latter tend to follow predictable formulas. Dennis's songs are described as light and accessible, recalling Madonna's early work but with a vocal strength compared to Sheena Easton. In conclusion, the critic notes that for Cathy to achieve long-term artistic success, she will need to infuse more individuality into her music, rather than simply repeating established models.

== Commercial performance ==
Move to This entered the US Billboard 200 on the week of 15 December 1990 at number 173. It spent 40 weeks on the chart, peaking at number 67 on the week of 11 May 1991. The album was certified Gold in the UK, and according to Music Week (21 September 1991), by that date it was about to replicate the achievement in Japan and Australia.

In 1992, Billboard reported that Cathy Dennis was among the first artists signed to the newly formed PolyGram Label Group (PLG). Her debut album generated three U.S. top-10 singles but failed to achieve gold certification in the U.S., partly because the radio remixes differed substantially from the album versions. In a retrospective analysis, the website Talk About Pop Music estimates that the album sold over 400,000 copies in the United States, where it spent 40 weeks among the top 200 albums, and 250,000 in the United Kingdom.

== Track listing ==
No.	Title	Writer(s)	Producer(s)	Length
1.	"Just Another Dream"	Cathy Dennis; Daniel Kojo Poku	Dancin' Danny D	4:26 (Note: Many album releases featured a 4:03 edit of "Just Another Dream"; on later expanded versions of the album, this was included as the "US 7″ Mix".)
2.	"All Night Long (Touch Me)"	Dennis; Carmichael Gregory; Patrick Adams	Dennis; Phil Bodger	4:09
3.	"C'mon and Get My Love" (with D Mob)	Poku	Dancin' Danny D	3:50
4.	"Too Many Walls"	Dennis; Anne Dudley	Dennis; Bodger	4:38
5.	"Tell Me"	Dennis	Dennis; Bodger	4:13
6.	"Everybody Move"	Terry Britten; Dennis; Mike Leeson	Nile Rodgers	5:16
7.	"Move to This"	Garry Bell; Dennis	Dennis; Bodger	3:34
8.	"My Beating Heart"	Dennis; Susan Schiffron	Rodgers	4:43
9.	"Got to Get Your Love"	Dennis	Dennis; Bodger	3:41
10.	"Taste My Love"	Dennis; Poku	Dennis; Bodger; Dancin' Danny D	3:40
Total length:				42:10

Japan bonus tracks
No.	Title	Writer(s)	Length
11.	"Just Another Dream" (12″ Mix)	Dennis; Poku	6:32
12.	"Just Another Dream" (Alternative Bass Dub Version)	Dennis; Poku	5:47
Total length:			54:29

Japan edition Move to This: Remix Album bonus disc
No.	Title	Writer(s)	Length
1.	"Just Another Dream" (12″ Mix)	Dennis; Poku	6:33
2.	"Touch Me (All Night Long)" (Remix)	Dennis; Gregory; Adams	4:00
3.	"C'mon and Get My Love"	Poku	3:49
4.	"Too Many Walls" (L'autre Mix)	Dennis; Dudley	4:06
5.	"Tell Me"	Dennis	4:13
6.	"Everybody Move" (Pop Mix)	Britten; Dennis; Leeson	5:14
7.	"Move to This"	Bell; Dennis	3:35
8.	"My Beating Heart"	Dennis; Schiffron	4:43
9.	"Got to Get Your Love"	Dennis	3:42
10.	"Taste My Love"	Dennis; Poku	3:22
11.	"Touch Me (All Night Long)" (Club Mix)	Dennis; Gregory; Adams	7:19
12.	"Love Is"	Dennis	3:35
13.	"Everybody Move" (Everybody's Club Mix)	Britten; Dennis; Leeson	8:13
Total length:			60:48

=== 2014 Remastered Expanded Edition ===
Disc 1 bonus tracks
No.	Title	Writer(s)	Length
11.	"Just Another Dream" (Danny D 7″ Edit)	Dennis; Poku	3:41
12.	"Touch Me (All Night Long)" (7″ Mix)	Dennis; Gregory; Adams	3:28
13.	"That's the Way of the World" (D Mob featuring Cathy Dennis)	D. Mob; Dennis	3:53
14.	"Too Many Walls" (Acoustic Version)	Dennis; Dudley	3:42
15.	"Love Is"	Dennis	3:34
16.	"Everybody Move" (7″ Shep Pettibone Mix)	Britten; Dennis; Leeson	3:36
17.	"Just Another Dream" (7″ US Mix)	Dennis; Poku	4:01
18.	"Everybody Move" (Padapella Mix)	Britten; Dennis; Leeson	4:55
19.	"Just Another Dream" (Paul Simpson U.S. Remix)	Dennis; Poku	6:22

Disc 2
No.	Title	Writer(s)	Length
1.	"C'mon and Get My Love" (Dance Hall Mix)	Poku	7:36
2.	"Just Another Dream" (12″ Mix)	Dennis; Poku	6:32
3.	"Everybody Move" (Everybody's House Mix)	Britten; Dennis; Leeson	7:36
4.	"Touch Me (All Night Long)" (Club Mix)	Dennis; Gregory; Adams	7:17
5.	"Too Many Walls" (L'Autre Mix)	Dennis; Dudley	4:05
6.	"C'mon and Get My Love" (Spaghetti Western Mix)	Poku	7:50
7.	"Everybody Move" (Club Mix)	Britten; Dennis; Leeson	8:10
8.	"Just Another Dream" (Funky Love Mix)	Dennis; Poku	9:20
9.	"C’mon and Get My Love" (Dedication Mix)	Poku	6:57
10.	"Just Another Dream" (Nightlife Mix)	Dennis; Poku	6:02
11.	"Just Another Dream" (Dream Mix (Note: The Dream Mix of "Just Another Dream" is incorrectly labeled as the Alternative Bass Mix.))	Dennis; Poku	7:34

== Personnel ==
- Cathy Dennis – lead and harmony vocals, backing vocals (5)
- Garry Hughes – programming (1, 2, 3, 6, 7, 9, 10)
- Marius de Vries – programming (1, 3, 4, 5, 9, 10)
- Alan Schwartz – additional programming (1)
- Eric Cody – keyboards, keyboard programming (8)
- Paul Taylor – programming (4)
- Paul Ellis – programming (5)
- Richard Hilton – keyboards (6, 8), drum programming (6), keyboard programming (8)
- Tony Plater – guitars (2)
- Nile Rodgers – guitars (6, 8)
- Bernard Edwards – bass (6)
- Ivan Hampden Jr. – drums (6)
- Anne Dudley – string arrangements (3, 4)
- Mike Stevens – brass (4)
- Dancin' Danny D. – backing vocals (1)
- Juliet Roberts – backing vocals (2)
- D Mob – backing vocals (3)
- Curtis King – backing vocals (6)
- Fonzi Thornton – backing vocals (6)
- Michelle Cobbs – backing vocals (6)
- Lamya – backing vocals (6)

== Production ==
- Bruce Carbone – executive producer
- Dancin' Danny D. – producer (1, 3)
- Shep Pettibone – co-producer (1), mixing (1, 2)
- Phil Bodger – producer (2, 4, 5, 7, 9, 10), engineer, mixing (8)
- Cathy Dennis – producer (2, 4, 5, 7, 9, 10), mixing (8)
- Nile Rodgers – producer (6, 8)
- Alan Gregorie – remix engineer (1)
- Dave Burnham – assistant engineer (4)
- Tom Duarte – mixing (6)
- Budd Tunick – production manager
- Michael Nash Associates – album design
- Zanna – photography

== Charts ==
=== Weekly charts ===
Chart (1990–91)	Peak position
Australian Albums (ARIA)	32
Canada (RPM)	44
UK Albums (Official Charts)	3
US Billboard 200	67

=== Year-end charts ===
Year-end chart performance for Move to This
Chart (1991)	Position
UK Albums (OCC)	59

== Certifications and sales ==
Region	Certification	Certified units/sales
Canada (Music Canada)	Gold	50,000^{^}
Italy	—	10,000
United Kingdom (BPI)	Gold	250,000
United States	—	400,000
Summaries
Worldwide	—	1,000,000
^{^} Shipments figures based on certification alone.
