= Walking on Sunshine =

Walking on Sunshine may refer to:

- Walking on Sunshine (Eddy Grant album), 1978
  - "Walking on Sunshine" (Eddy Grant song), a hit for Rockers Revenge in 1982
- Walking on Sunshine (Katrina and the Waves album), 1983
  - "Walking on Sunshine" (Katrina and the Waves song)
- "Walking on Sunshine" (Jennifer Lopez song), 2001
- Walking on Sunshine (film), a 2014 film
