= Am I the Kinda Girl? =

Studio album by Cathy Dennis
- Released: 14 October 1996 (Australia); March 1997 (UK)
- Genre: Alternative pop; rock; Britpop
- Length: 40:27
- Label: Polydor
- Producer: Cathy Dennis; Mark Saunders

Cathy Dennis chronology
Into the Skyline (1992)	Am I the Kinda Girl? (1996)	The Irresistible Cathy Dennis (2000)

Singles from Am I the Kinda Girl?
- 1. "West End Pad" Released: 1996; 2. "Waterloo Sunset" Released: 1997; 3. "When Dreams Turn to Dust" Released: 1997

Professional ratings
Review scores
Source	Rating
AllMusic	4/5 stars

Am I the Kinda Girl? is the third and final studio album by British singer-songwriter Cathy Dennis. It was released through Polydor Records in October 1996 in Australia, and in March 1997 in the UK. Dennis abandoned the dance-pop sound of previous releases and switched to a more traditional singer-songwriter approach. The resulting album, Am I the Kinda Girl?, was more in keeping with the Britpop sound of bands such as Blur and performers such as Stephen Duffy, and features collaborations with Guy Chambers of The Lemon Trees and Andy Partridge of XTC. The album features the singles "West End Pad", "When Dreams Turn to Dust", and a cover of The Kinks' 1967 hit "Waterloo Sunset".

== Track listing ==
No.	Title	Writer(s)	Length
1.	"West End Pad"	Cathy Dennis; Mark Saunders	3:03
2.	"Fickle"	Guy Chambers; Dennis	3:15
3.	"When Dreams Turn to Dust"	Chambers; Dennis	4:07
4.	"Stupid Fool"	Dennis; Saunders	4:17
5.	"Am I the Kinda Girl?"	Dennis; Andy Partridge	3:26
6.	"Homing the Rocket"	Dennis; Saunders	3:34
7.	"That Is Why You Love Me"	Chambers; Dennis	3:16
8.	"Waterloo Sunset"	Ray Davies	3:39
9.	"Don't Take My Heaven"	Chambers; Dennis	4:15
10.	"The Date"	Davies; Dennis	4:35
11.	"Crazy Ones"	Dennis; Saunders	3:00
Total length:			40:27

Japan bonus tracks
No.	Title	Writer(s)	Length
12.	"Run Like a River"	Dennis; C. Braide	3:37
13.	"I Just Love You"	Dennis; F. Dunnery	4:46
Total length:			48:54

== Personnel ==
Personnel as per Discogs.

- Cathy Dennis – vocals, keyboards, harmonica on "Crazy Ones"
- Guy Chambers – guitar, keyboards, accordion on "Stupid Fool"
- Mark Saunders – guitar, bass, keyboards, drum programming
- Neil Conti, Tam Johnstone – drums
- Melvin Duffy – steel guitar on "Fickle"
- Yolanda Charles – bass guitar on "When Dreams Turn to Dust"
- Dave Gregory – guitar on "Am I the Kinda Girl?"

Technical

- Mark Saunders – engineer, mixer
- Danton Supple – engineer
- Dave Burnham, Glenn Skinner – drum recordings
- Mark "Spike" Stent – mixing
- Ellen von Unwerth – cover photography

== Charts ==
Chart (1996–1997)	Peak position
Australian Albums (ARIA)	183
UK Albums (OCC)	78

== Non-album tracks ==
Recorded as part of the same sessions, Dennis released the following as B-sides to the singles for the album.

- Fade Away
- Roller Coaster
- Consolation
- Sunny Afternoon
- I Just Love You
- Baggage
- Run Like A River
- Falling (new recording)
- Too Many Walls (new recording)

=== Unreleased tracks ===
In May 2021, Mark Saunders, who worked with Dennis on the album, post short samples of further tracks indicating that there was more unreleased material. Further discussion revealed more content is unreleased than the tracks Mark Saunders has given in the sample/worked on.

The track titles of the songs

- Cars And Boats
- Somebody
- Nothing I Can Do
- Stop
- Half Of Me Is Reality
- These Arms
- Keep You For Myself
- Conscious Of Myself
- I'm A Sailor
- Tempted To Stray
- Yesterday's News
