= Put Your Hands Together =

Put Your Hands Together may refer to:

- "Put Your Hands Together" (D Mob song), 1990
- "Put Your Hands Together" (The O'Jays song), 1973
