= You Lied to Me =

Single by Cathy Dennis

from the album Into the Skyline
- Released: 17 August 1992
- Genre: Dance-pop; house
- Length: 4:09
- Label: Polydor
- Songwriters: Cathy Dennis; Greg Carmichael; Patrick Adams
- Producers: Cathy Dennis; Phil Bodger

Cathy Dennis singles chronology
"Everybody Move" (1991)	"You Lied to Me" (1992)	"Irresistible" (1992)

Licensed audio
- "You Lied to Me" on YouTube

"You Lied to Me" is a song by British dance-pop singer-songwriter Cathy Dennis, released in August 1992 by Polydor Records as the first single from her second album, Into the Skyline (1992). The song was written by Dennis with Greg Carmichael, Patrick Adams, and produced by her with Phil Bodger. It received favorable reviews from music critics. In the US, it was a top-40 hit on the Billboard Hot 100, while peaking at number 12 on the Billboard Hot Dance Club Play chart. In the UK, the song peaked at number 34 on both the UK Singles Chart and the Music Week Dance Singles chart, and number 19 on the UK Club Chart.

== Critical reception ==
Larry Flick from Billboard magazine wrote that Dennis "twirls back onto the dance floor with an aggressive, attitudinal pop/houser". He explained, "Teaming her up with club kingpin Shep Pettibone was an inspired move. He dresses her lovely voice with vigorous beats, layers of intricate keyboard effects, and an unshakable chorus. [...] Totally fierce." Another Billboard editor stated that Dennis' vocal range "has grown considerably, as proven on 'You Lied to Me', which casts her as a swaggering diva". Randy Clark from Cash Box described it as a "dance beat track" where Dennis is "keeping her dance roots alive". David Browne from Entertainment Weekly stated that it "is worthy of 'Touch Me (All Night Long)' and her whooshing club hits".

Dave Sholin from the Gavin Report commented, "It's clear by her track record this multitalented singer, producer, writer has a magic touch when it comes to putting together hits for Top 40 radio. Once again, Cathy delivers a house pleaser that's sure to pump non-stop excitement onto the airwaves." A reviewer from Music & Media called it "jubilant". Nancy Culp from NME wrote that it "stomps along with a healthy amount of conviction". Sam Wood from Philadelphia Inquirer felt "You Lied to Me" "do recall the bouncy ebullience of 'Just Another Dream', Dennis' breakthrough hit." Mark Frith from Smash Hits praised the track, giving it a full score of five out of five. He stated that Dennis "gives the vocal performance of a lifetime about her two-timing man who's on his way out of her door. A triumphant return to form and runner-up best new single."

== Track listings ==
- UK CD single
1. "You Lied to Me" (Radio Edit)
2. "You Lied to Me" (Dan's Club Mix)
3. "You Lied to Me" (Sprayed With Shep's Attitude Mix)
4. "You Lied to Me" (Pathological Mix)
5. "You Lied to Me" (Dan's Dub Mix)
- US CD single
1. "You Lied to Me"
2. "Nothing Moves Me"
3. "You Lied to Me" (Sprayed With Shep's Attitude Dub 1)
4. "You Lied to Me" (Sprayed Extended Mix)

== Charts ==
Chart (1992)	Peak position
Australia (ARIA)	112
Canada Top Singles (RPM)	46
Europe (European Dance Radio)	8
Finland (Suomen virallinen lista)	19
UK Singles (Official Charts)	34
UK Airplay (Music Week)	18
UK Dance (Music Week)	34
UK Club Chart (Music Week)	19
US Billboard Hot 100	32
US Dance Club Songs (Billboard)	12
US Dance Singles Sales (Billboard)	6
US Pop Airplay (Billboard)	28
US Rhythmic Airplay (Billboard)	22
US Cash Box Top 100	27
