= Adventure (Eleanor song) =

Single by Eleanor

from the album Jungle Wave
- B-side: One Dot World (7")
- Released: 1988
- Recorded: 1988
- Genre: House
- Length: 8:00 (Extended); 4:00 (Radio edit)
- Label: Columbia Records
- Songwriter(s): Eleanor Academia
- Producer(s): Eleanor Academia; Shep Pettibone

Eleanor singles chronology
"Better Safe Than Sorry" (1987)	"Adventure" (1988)

"Adventure" is a song by American singer Eleanor issued as a single in 1988 on Columbia Records. The single rose to number one on the Billboard Dance Club Songs chart.

== Overview ==
Adventure was produced by Eleanor and Shep Pettibone. Also guesting on the song was singer Jim Gilstrap.

The track sampled D Train's 1982 single "You're the One for Me" and Rockers Revenge's bassline riff from "Walking On Sunshine".

== Track listings ==
7" (US)

- A. "Adventure" 4:00
- B. "One Dot World" 5:39

12" (US)

- A1. "Adventure" (Extended Mix) 8:00
- A2. "Adventure" (Dub Mix) 7:45
- B1. "Adventure" (Edited Version) 4:00
- B2. "Adventure" (Bonus Beats) 4:44
