= Irresistible (Cathy Dennis song) =

1992 single by Cathy Dennis

Single by Cathy Dennis

from the album Into the Skyline
- Released: 9 November 1992
- Genre: Dance-pop
- Length: 3:48
- Label: Polydor
- Songwriters: Cathy Dennis; Greg Carmichael; Patrick Adams
- Producers: Cathy Dennis; Phil Bodger

Cathy Dennis singles chronology
| "You Lied to Me" (1992) | "Irresistible" (1992) | "Falling" (1993) |

Licensed audio
- "Irresistible" on YouTube

"Irresistible" is a song by British dance-pop singer-songwriter Cathy Dennis, released in November 1992 by Polydor Records as the second single from her second album, Into the Skyline (1992). The song was co-written and co-produced by Dennis, but failed to make the success of the previous singles. In the US, the single had three different promo CD singles, each with their own remixes each with a more acoustic song. The song's accompanying music video was directed by London-based photographer and art director Zanna, depicting Dennis walking and singing and displaying sea creatures, especially starfish, on the seashore.

== Critical reception ==
Larry Flick from Billboard magazine complimented the song as "another moment of dance/pop pleasure". He noted that "a rolling, funk-style beat supports an infectious chorus and a glistening wash of synths. Dennis' playful vocal gives the tune a necessary lighthearted quality." Randy Clark from Cashbox commented, "Although most would think with the 'Material Girl''s Shep Pettibone and Tony Shimkin as co-writers the effort would take on a heavy Madonna slant, but out of the left field, this song comes off more like Amy Grant's 'Baby Baby'."

A reviewer from Music & Media wrote, "Shopping for sensual dance music, with the ambient tone of Madonna's 'Erotica'? Try something else from the ladies department, where producer Pettibone is the latest fashion." Ian McCann from NME said, "Absolutely sexy and cutely delightful." Peter Stanton from Smash Hits gave the song a score of four out of five, writing, "A fine return to form for Ms Dennis that should get chart land quaking in its boots again. A glorious singalonga chorus with a sexy groove".

== Track listing ==
- UK CD single
1. "Irresistible"
2. "Irresistible" (Xtended mix)
3. "Touch Me" (alternative 12-inch)
4. "You Lied to Me" (Domination mix)

== Charts ==
=== Weekly charts ===
| Chart (1992–1993) | Peak position |
|---|---|
| Australia (ARIA) | 103 |
| Canada Top Singles (RPM) | 23 |
| Europe (European Dance Radio) | 24 |
| UK Singles (Official Charts) | 24 |
| UK Airplay (Music Week) | 21 |
| UK Dance (Music Week) | 26 |
| UK Club Chart (Music Week) | 63 |
| US Billboard Hot 100 | 61 |
| US Adult Contemporary (Billboard) | 6 |
| US Pop Airplay (Billboard) | 36 |

=== Year-end charts ===
| Chart (1993) | Position |
|---|---|
| US Adult Contemporary (Billboard) | 42 |
