= West End Pad =

Single by Cathy Dennis

from the album Am I the Kinda Girl?
- Released: 1996
- Length: 4:09
- Label: Polydor
- Songwriter(s): Cathy Dennis; M Saunders

Cathy Dennis singles chronology
"Why" (1994)	"West End Pad" (1996)	"Waterloo Sunset" (1997)

"West End Pad" is a song by British dance-pop singer-songwriter Cathy Dennis, released in 1996 by Polydor as the first single from her third album, Am I the Kinda Girl? (1996). It was co-written by Dennis and reached number 25 on the UK Singles Chart in August 1996.

== Critical reception ==
Daniel Booth from Melody Maker wrote, "It is a summery delight, with some wonderfully audacious lyrics dismissing the luxuries of life for the simple pleasure of a love life: I tried a West End pad and a classic car/My favourite drink in my favourite car/A few close friends and a movie star..."

== Music video ==
A promotional video was filmed for the song. It begins with Dennis racing back and forth, setting up the microphone, as she prepares to sing the song. Behind her is a video wall consisting of thirty-six screens. Dennis' disembodied lips fill up these screens, as they, too, sing the song.

== Track listings ==
- UK CD 1 single
1. "West End Pad"
2. "Baggage"
3. "West End Pad" (Extended Mix)
- UK CD 2 single
1. "West End Pad"
2. "Crazy Ones"
3. "Run Like a River"
4. "Too Many Walls" (Acoustic Mix)

== Charts ==
Chart (1996)	Peak position
Australia (ARIA)	172
UK Singles (OCC)	25
