= Now That's What I Call Disco =

Compilation album by Various Artists
- Released: 23 August 2013 (Republic of Ireland); 26 August 2013 (United Kingdom)
- Recorded: 1974, 1975, 1976, 1977, 1978, 1979, 1980, 1981, 1982, 1983, 1988, 2009
- Genre: Pop; disco; funk
- Label: Sony Music Entertainment; EMI; Virgin Music Group; UMG; Warner Music Group

Various Artists chronology
Now That's What I Call 30 Years (2013)	Now That's What I Call Disco (2013)	Now That's What I Call 80s Dance (2013)

Now That's What I Call Disco or Now Disco is a triple-disc compilation album which was released in the United Kingdom on 26 August 2013. It includes 62 classic hits from the disco era.

== Track listing ==
=== CD 1 ===
1. Chic - Good Times
2. The Jacksons - Shake Your Body (Down to the Ground)
3. Sister Sledge - We are Family
4. The Trammps - Disco Inferno
5. Earth, Wind & Fire - Boogie Wonderland
6. Donna Summer - I Feel Love
7. Diana Ross - Upside Down
8. Village People - Y.M.C.A.
9. Kool & the Gang - Celebration
10. Boney M. - Rasputin
11. Gloria Gaynor - I Will Survive
12. ABBA - Dancing Queen
13. Tavares - More Than a Woman
14. Ottawan - D.I.S.C.O.
15. The Ritchie Family - The Best Disco in Town
16. KC & the Sunshine Band - Get Down Tonight
17. Shalamar - A Night to Remember
18. Lipps Inc. - Funkytown
19. Evelyn "Champagne" King - Shame
20. Candi Staton - Young Hearts Run Free
21. Rose Royce - Is It Love You're After

=== CD 2 ===
1. Sister Sledge - He's the Greatest Dancer
2. KC & the Sunshine Band - That's the Way (I Like It)
3. Donna Summer - Hot Stuff
4. Diana Ross - I'm Coming Out
5. Rufus & Chaka Khan - Ain't Nobody
6. Labelle - Lady Marmalade
7. Gibson Brothers - Cuba
8. Village People - In the Navy
9. Kool & the Gang - Ladies' Night
10. The Real Thing - Can You Feel the Force
11. The Gap Band - Oops Up Side Your Head
12. Heatwave - Boogie Nights
13. Michael Zager Band - Let's All Chant
14. The Hues Corporation - Rock the Boat
15. Barry White - You're the First, the Last, My Everything
16. George McCrae - Rock Your Baby
17. Van McCoy & the Soul City Symphony - The Hustle
18. The Whispers - And the Beat Goes On
19. McFadden & Whitehead - Ain't No Stoppin' Us Now
20. Narada Michael Walden - I Shoulda Loved Ya
21. Stacy Lattisaw - Jump to the Beat

=== CD 3 ===
1. The Jacksons - Blame It on the Boogie
2. Chic - Le Freak
3. Rose Royce - Car Wash
4. Earth, Wind & Fire - September
5. Odyssey - Native New Yorker
6. Sheila B. Devotion - Spacer
7. Sylvester - You Make Me Feel (Mighty Real)
8. A Taste of Honey - Boogie Oogie Oogie
9. Silver Convention - Get Up and Boogie
10. Yvonne Elliman - If I Can't Have You
11. Anita Ward - Ring My Bell
12. Cheryl Lynn - Got to Be Real
13. Alicia Bridges - I Love the Nightlife (Disco 'Round)
14. Chaka Khan - I'm Every Woman
15. Thelma Houston - Don't Leave Me This Way
16. Yarbrough & Peoples - Don't Stop the Music
17. Dan Hartman - Relight My Fire
18. Patrice Rushen - Forget Me Nots
19. Quincy Jones feat. Dune - Ai No Corrida
20. Cerrone - Supernature
21. Two Man Sound - Que Tal America

== Charts ==
Chart (2013)	Peak Position
UK Compilations Chart	4
UK Download Albums Chart	7
