= That's the Way of the World (D Mob song) =

Single by D Mob featuring Cathy Dennis

from the album A Little Bit of This, a Little Bit of That
- Released: 19 March 1990
- Genre: House
- Label: FFRR
- Songwriters: D Mob; Cathy Dennis
- Producer: D Mob

D Mob singles chronology
"Put Your Hands Together" (1990)	"That's the Way of the World" (1990)	"Why" (1994)

Cathy Dennis singles chronology
"Just Another Dream" (1989)	"That's the Way of the World" (1990)	"Touch Me (All Night Long)" (1991)

Music video
- "That's the Way of the World" on YouTube

"That's the Way of the World" is a song by British dance producer D Mob featuring singer Cathy Dennis. Released on 19 March 1990 by FFRR Records, it went to number-one on the US dance charts for one week and was the second number-one single for D Mob in which Cathy Dennis performed the vocals, and the fourth and final release to reach number-one for D Mob. The accompanying music video was directed by British director Howard Greenhalgh.

== Critical reception ==
Alex Henderson from AllMusic stated that "the more melodic and accessible nature of "deep house" is evident" on the song, adding it as a "very addictive" club hit that feature "likeable dance diva" Cathy Dennis. Bill Coleman from Billboard magazine wrote, "Rack up another No. 1 for the D. Tasty new mixes of the infectious pop/dance nugget are sure to make this a programming staple." Ernest Hardy from Cash Box commented, "This was immediately one of my favorite cuts off the album, A Little Bit of This, A Little Bit of That. Lyrically, it's one of the more cynical efforts out right now ("Nothing matters 'til you make it... nothing matters in the end") and though it has that D-Mob sound, it also manages to lean more toward club than pop. Cathy Dennis' performance is both detached [sic] and aching." David Giles from Music Week described it as "a fairy standard Brit-house track." He added, "You're familiar with the formula by now I'm sure—stuttering piano, a beat that fades into the background after a while like a ticking clock, and throwaway bluesy soul female vocals."

== Track listings ==
- UK CD single
1. "That's the Way of the World" (7")
2. "That's the Way of the World" (Essential Beat mix)
3. "That's the Way of the World" (instrumental version)
4. "That's the Way of the World" (accapella version)

== Charts ==
Chart performance for "That's the Way of the World"
Chart (1990)	Peak position
Australia (ARIA)	98
Ireland (IRMA)	28
UK Singles (Official Charts)	48
US Billboard Hot 100	59
US Dance Club Songs (Billboard)	1
US Cash Box Top 100	55
