= Gary Haisman =

English singer

- Born: Gary Haisman; 29 January 1958; Buckinghamshire, England
- Died: 28 November 2018 (aged 60)
- Occupation: Musician

Gary Haisman (29 January 1958 – 28 November 2018) was an English singer and one of three acts whose No. 1 songs on the Billboard Hot Dance Music/Club Play chart were featured on D Mob's A Little Bit of This, a Little Bit of That album (the others being Cathy Dennis and LRS). His contribution to the set was the two-sided single "We Call It Acieed"/"Trance Dance", which was the first of D Mob's four straight No. 1 hits on the Dance chart in 1989.

Haisman initially worked as a club promoter, as well as a prominent club "face" and dancer in London. On a local scale, he organized events like Raid at various clubs in London, including Shoom, and became one of the most recognizable figures in the acid house club scene during the late '80s. He was also the PR manager for Spectrum, London's first acid house club, and a part of the Boys Own fanzine crew, alongside Terry Farley, Andrew Weatherall and others.

Haisman was also behind the popular clubbing phrase "It’s all gone Pete Tong", which later inspired the title of a major dance music film and was eventually embraced by Pete Tong for his Ibiza nights.

Haisman lived in Spain for many years, where he contracted deep vein thrombosis and came close to death. Later, he returned to the UK, reconnecting with many figures from the old acid house scene.

== See also ==
- List of number-one dance hits (United States)
- List of artists who reached number one on the US Dance chart
