= Why (D Mob song) =

1994 single by D Mob

Single by D Mob featuring Cathy Dennis

from the album Into the Skyline
- Released: 31 January 1994
- Genre: Dance-pop; garage house
- Length: 4:54
- Label: FFRR
- Songwriters: Cathy Dennis; Danny Poku
- Producer: D Mob

D Mob singles chronology
"That's the Way of the World" (1990)	"Why" (1994)	"One Day" (1994)

Cathy Dennis singles chronology
"Falling" (1993)	"Why" (1994)	"West End Pad" (1996)

"Why" is a song by British music producer and remixer D Mob featuring British singer-songwriter Cathy Dennis. It was produced and co-written by D Mob with Dennis and released in January 1994, by FFRR Records, as the fourth single from Dennis's second album, Into the Skyline (1992), a full year after her previous single from the album. In the UK, it reached number 23 on the UK Singles Chart, number seven on the Music Week Dance Singles chart and number one on the UK Club Chart, making it the most successful single from the album. "Why" was dedicated in memory of Philip Hall, who died in December 1993.

== Critical reception ==
Larry Flick from Billboard magazine wrote, "Dancin' Danny D's long-dormant brainchild D-Mob has finally resurfaced with 'Why', a smokin' pop/houser first heard last year on Cathy Dennis Into the Skyline album. The pixie-ish singer still fronts the wildly contagious tune, which has been revamped to excellent effect on a nicely sequenced double-record set by Danny D and Todd Terry that carefully tries to offer something for everyone (without alienating the act's hardcore fans in the process). No solid word on when a full D-Mob album will see the light of day, but this single provides more than ample reason to be cheerful." Peter Paphides from Melody Maker noted, "This time around, he's twiddling the knobs while Cathy Dennis sings things like "baby, baby, baby" and this ace piano motif ascends through the chorus bearing a torch for every Detroit stomper since 'Love Can't Turn Around'."

Andy Beevers from Music Week gave the song a top score of five out of five, naming it "a catchy song delivered in a variety of strong club mixes, ranging from swing to house." Sam Wood from Philadelphia Inquirer felt it "do recall the bouncy ebullience" of "Just Another Dream", which was Dennis' breakthrough hit. Tim Jeffery from the Record Mirror Dance Update complimented it as a "bright, chirpy pop garage number that chugs along nicely." He concluded that Dennis' voice "is so distinctive that everyone will think this is her own single." Another RM editor, James Hamilton, named it a "plaintively insistent lurching jiggly ditty" in his weekly dance column.

== Track listing ==
- UK CD single
1. "Why" (radio edit)
2. "Why" (Tee's radio edit)
3. "Why" (R&B edit)
4. "Why" (Monster club mix)
5. "Why" (Tee's club mix)
6. "Why" (Dean Street mix)

== Charts ==
Chart performance for "Why"
Chart (1994)	Peak position
Australia (ARIA)	193
Europe (Eurochart Hot 100)	63
UK Singles (OCC)	23
UK Airplay (Music Week)	15
UK Dance (Music Week)	7
UK Club Chart (Music Week)	1
