= Walking on Sunshine (Eddy Grant song) =

1979 song by Eddy Grant

Single by Eddy Grant

from the album Walking on Sunshine
- B-side: "Sunshine Jam"
- Released: 16 March 1979
- Recorded: 1979
- Studio: The Coach House Recording Studio, Stamford Hill, London
- Genre: Disco; funk
- Length: 5:20; 3:00 (single version)
- Label: Ice
- Songwriter: Eddy Grant
- Producer: Eddy Grant

Eddy Grant singles chronology
"Say I Love You" (1978)	"Walking on Sunshine" (1979)	"Living on the Frontline" (1979)

"Walking on Sunshine" is a song by Eddy Grant, and the title track of his third studio album. It was released as a single in 1979, backed with an instrumental jam version of the song titled "Sunshine Jam". Grant's original version was not a hit, but the song was remade three years later by Rockers Revenge, a studio project assembled by producer Arthur Baker, which became the hit version.

Grant's version was later remixed by Tim Simenon, who added to the track many elements of African music. It was aptly titled the "Zulu Mix" and was released in promotion of Grant's second compilation album, Walking on Sunshine – The Very Best of Eddy Grant. This version charted at No. 63 in the UK.

== Rockers Revenge version ==
"Walking on Sunshine"

Single by Rockers Revenge featuring Donnie Calvin
- B-side: "Rockin' on Sunshine"; "Acappella Sunshine" (12" only)
- Released: 1982
- Genre: Post-disco
- Length: 3:44 (7"); 9:30 (Vocal, 12")
- Label: Streetwise (US); London (UK)
- Songwriter: Eddy Grant
- Producer: Arthur Baker

Rockers Revenge singles chronology
"Sunshine Partytime" (1982)	"Walking on Sunshine" (1982)	"The Harder They Come" (1982)

Rockers Revenge released their version as a single in 1982, with vocals by Donnie Calvin. It peaked at number four on the UK Singles Chart and reached the top thirty in Belgium, the Netherlands, and New Zealand. The single did not chart on the Billboard Hot 100, but was number one on the Billboard Hot Dance Club Play chart for one week and also peaked at number 63 on the Billboard Hot Black Singles chart. The song's bassline would later be sampled in Eleanor's 1988 song "Adventure", itself a number-one Dance Club Play hit in 1988.

=== Personnel ===
- Fred Zarr – bass guitar, keyboard instrument
- Donnie Calvin – vocals
- Bashiri Johnson – percussion
- Jellybean Benitez and Arthur Baker – mixers

=== Chart performance and certifications ===
==== Weekly charts ====
Chart (1982)	Peak position
Belgium (Ultratop 50 Flanders)	19
Netherlands (Single Top 100)	20
New Zealand (Recorded Music NZ)	30
UK Singles (Official Charts)	4
Billboard Hot Dance Club Play	1
Billboard Hot Black Singles	63

==== Certifications ====
Region	Certification	Certified units/sales
United Kingdom (BPI)	Silver	250,000^{^}
^{^} Shipments figures based on certification alone.
