= Put Your Hands Together (D Mob song) =

Single by D Mob featuring Nuff Juice

from the album A Little Bit of This, a Little Bit of That
- Released: 1 January 1990
- Genre: Hip house

D Mob singles chronology
"C'mon and Get My Love" (1989)	"Put Your Hands Together" (1990)	"That's the Way of the World" (1990)

"Put Your Hands Together" is a hip house song by British music producer and remixer D Mob featuring Nuff Juice. Released as the fourth single from his only album, A Little Bit of This, a Little Bit of That (1989), it made the UK top 10, peaking at number seven. The song also reached the top 40 in several other charts across Europe, as well as reaching number 71 in Australia. It heavily samples a song by the O'Jays, though not their 1973 hit of the same name, but their 1983 recording "Put Our Heads Together" from the album When Will I See You Again.

== Charts ==
=== Weekly charts ===
Chart (1990)	Peak position
Australia (ARIA)	71
Austria (Ö3 Austria Top 40)	22
Europe (Eurochart Hot 100)	25
Finland (Suomen virallinen lista)	19
Luxembourg (Radio Luxembourg)	6
Netherlands (Dutch Top 40)	19
Netherlands (Single Top 100)	16
Switzerland (Schweizer Hitparade)	28
UK Singles (OCC)	7
West Germany (Official German Charts)	23

=== Year-end charts ===
Chart (1990)	Position
UK Club Chart (Record Mirror)	82
