= A Little Bit of This, a Little Bit of That =

Studio album by D Mob
- Released: 1989
- Recorded: 1988–1989
- Studio: Audio One; Matrix; Roundhouse; Music Works
- Genre: Hip house; acid house; dance-pop; R&B
- Length: 56:48
- Label: FFRR; London
- Producer: Dancin' Danny D.; Dave Dorrell; C. J. Mackintosh

Singles from A Little Bit of This, a Little Bit of That
- 1. "We Call It Acieed" Released: 3 October 1988; 2. "It Is Time to Get Funky" Released: 3 March 1989; 3. "C'mon and Get My Love" Released: 2 October 1989; 4. "Put Your Hands Together" Released: 1 January 1990; 5. "That's the Way of the World" Released: 19 March 1990

Professional ratings
Review scores
Source	Rating
AllMusic	4.5/5 stars
The Encyclopedia of Popular Music	3/5 stars
The Rolling Stone Album Guide	3/5 stars

A Little Bit of This, a Little Bit of That is the only studio album British music producer D Mob, released on FFRR Records in 1989. The album peaked at No. 46 on the UK Albums Chart, No. 72 in Australia, and No. 82 on the Billboard 200 in the US.

British singer and songwriter Cathy Dennis sings vocals for two songs, one of which, "C'mon and Get My Love", became a top 10 hit in the United States, peaking at number 10, and reaching number 15 in the UK.

== Critical reception ==
AllMusic wrote, "Those who consider house music one-dimensional must give a serious listen to D-Mob's unpredictable and appropriately titled A Little Bit of This, A Little Bit of That." Bill Coleman from Billboard commented, "Coming off three No. 1 club hits, D-Mob finally unleashes its album debut [...] and it grooves. D-Mob brainchild, popular U.K. remixer Dancin' Danny D (aka Danny Poku) lays it out on the line and proves himself a more-than-able producer/songwriter/artist who has got quite a few tricks up his sleeve. Featuring a varied assemblage of performers, A Little Bit tackles a number of styles with ease and personality."

== Track listing ==
No.	Title	Writer(s)	Vocals	Length
1.	"C'mon and Get My Love"	Daniel Kojo Poku	Cathy Dennis	3:51
2.	"All I Do"	Stevie Wonder; Clarence Paul; Morris Broadnax	Danny Madden	5:56
3.	"It Really Don't Matter"	Poku	Dancin' Danny D	4:19
4.	"That's the Way of the World"	Poku; Cathy Dennis	Cathy Dennis	4:03
5.	"It Really Don't Matter" (Reprise)	Poku		2:49
6.	"It Is Time to Get Funky"	Poku; Courtney Coulson; Basil Reynolds; Charlie Scarlett	LRS and DC Sarome	3:31
7.	"Put Your Hands Together"	Poku; Kenneth Gamble; Leon Huff; Scarlett; Gary Stennet	Nuff Juice	4:09
8.	"A Rhythm from Within"	Poku; Marius de Vries		4:41
9.	"Trance Dance"	Poku	Gary Haisman	4:13
10.	"We Call It Acieed"	Poku	Gary Haisman	3:51
11.	"C'mon and Get My Love" (Spaghetti Western Mix)	Poku	Cathy Dennis	7:51
12.	"It Is Time to Get Funky" (The Casualty Mix)	Poku; Coulson; Reynolds; Scarlett	LRS and DC Sarome	8:10
Total length:				56:48
