= Falling (Cathy Dennis song) =

1993 single by Cathy Dennis

Single by Cathy Dennis

from the album Into the Skyline
- B-side: "Nothing Moves Me"
- Released: 25 January 1993
- Length: 4:39 (album version); 4:01 (PM Dawn remix)
- Label: Polydor
- Songwriters: Cathy Dennis; Shep Pettibone; Tony Shimkin
- Producers: Shep Pettibone; Cathy Dennis

Cathy Dennis singles chronology
"Irresistible" (1992)	"Falling" (1993)	"Why" (1994)

"Falling" is a song by British singer-songwriter Cathy Dennis, released in the United Kingdom in January 1993 by Polydor Records as the third single from her second album, Into the Skyline (1992). The song was written by Dennis with Shep Pettibone and Tony Shimkin, and she co-produced it with Pettibone. The single version was remixed by American hip hop and R&B act PM Dawn, peaking at number 32 on the UK Singles Chart and number 15 on the European Dance Radio Chart. This recording lead to Dennis singing backing vocals on their hit single "Looking Through Patient Eyes".

== Critical reception ==
Paul Verna from Billboard described the song as "a seductive love-call". In his weekly UK chart commentary, James Masterton wrote, "The lass from Norwich who has achieved the remarkable feat of becoming a superstar all over the world except in her home country. As a result, predicting the path of this, the third single from her latest album, is a little difficult. The single version is however billed as 'The PM Dawn Version' which may give it a slightly better chance than in its original Shep Pettibone mix." Pan-European magazine Music & Media declared it as a "stomper" and named it a "potential hit". Andy Beevers from Music Week gave it four out of five, adding, "This rather uninspiring mid-tempo song sounds more like an LP track than an obvious single. It benefits from a PM Dawn remix, but a Top 40 placing remains a possibility rather than a certainty."

== Music video ==
The accompanying music video for "Falling" was very much stylized as Dennis' scene shot in black and white with a glittery background. There are extras (especially white mice) that can be seen, as well as everything falling like nails, paper glitters, thumbtacks and the Cathy Dennis doll.

== Track listing ==
- UK CD single
1. "Falling" (The PM Dawn version)
2. "Falling" (The AAWWWS#!T mix by PM Dawn)
3. "Nothing Moves Me"
4. "Too Many Walls" (L'autre mix)

== Charts ==
Chart performance for "Falling"
Chart (1993)	Peak position
Europe (Eurochart Hot 100)	87
Europe (European Dance Radio)	15
UK Singles (OCC)	32
UK Airplay (Music Week)	49
