= We Call It Acieed =

Single by D Mob featuring Gary Haisman

from the album A Little Bit of This, a Little Bit of That
- Released: 3 October 1988
- Recorded: 1988
- Genre: Acid house; rave
- Length: 3:17
- Label: FFRR
- Songwriter: D Mob (as The D)
- Producer: Danny D

D Mob singles chronology
"We Call It Acieed" (1988)	"It Is Time to Get Funky" (1989)

Music video
- "We Call It Acieed" on YouTube

"We Call It Acieed" (Note: Many single releases spell "Acieeed" with three es; album releases consistently use "Acieed".) is the debut single by British musician D Mob. An acid house-influenced song from the debut album A Little Bit of This, a Little Bit of That, it features vocals by Gary Haisman. The song reached number 3 on the UK singles chart, No. 1 on Billboard's Dance Music/Club Play Singles chart and No. 25 on the Hot Dance Music/Maxi-Singles Sales chart in 1989.

The song is also featured on the compilation albums Dance Massive, Vol. 2 [Phantom], History of Techno [ZYX], Smash Hits 1988 and Acid House Anthems.

== Video ==
The video features D Mob and singing in front of people with yellow masks in the shapes of triangles, squares and circles, with the occasional mask of an eye. The song involves Haisman chanting "Acieed" through the entire video. The yellow smiley face icon had recently been adopted as a symbol of the acid house scene.

The original music video only lasted approximately two minutes long, as the record label FFRR did not think the song would be a hit and chose not to spend further money. Many years later, on 3rd October 2020, an official, modern-day edit of the video was made, stretching the length out to the full 3 minutes and 14 seconds of the radio version by repeating certain parts.

== Removal from BBC Playlist ==
Because the song seemed to be condoning drug use (despite Danny D's claim that the song was about the music and points that out in the lyrics, he also notes that he does not smoke, drink, or take drugs), in October 1988, the BBC removed the song from their playlists. The decision to ban the song came especially after Caron Keating and a smiley face T-shirted Steve Wright enthusiastically introduced the video for the song on the 20 October 1988 edition of Top of the Pops during an acid house backlash from tabloids, and this led to an absence of any records that referenced acid house on the show until "Stakker Humanoid" by Humanoid two months later.

== In popular culture ==
The track was used as a plot device on the BBC soap EastEnders in 2018.

== Charts ==
Charts (1988–89)	Peak position
Australia (ARIA)	85
Germany (Media Control Charts)	22
Irish Singles Chart	16
Netherlands (Single Top 100)	42
UK singles chart	3
US Billboard Dance/Club Play Chart	1

== See also ==
- List of Billboard number-one dance singles of 1989
- List of songs banned by the BBC
