= Waterloo Sunset =

1967 single by the Kinks

- West German picture sleeve

Single by the Kinks

from the album Something Else by the Kinks
- B-side: "Act Nice and Gentle" (UK); "Two Sisters" (US)
- Released: 5 May 1967
- Recorded: 3, 10 and 13 April 1967
- Studio: Pye, London
- Genre: Pop; rock; psychedelia
- Length: 3:16
- Label: Pye (UK); Reprise (US)
- Songwriter: Ray Davies
- Producer: Ray Davies

The Kinks UK singles chronology
"Dead End Street" (1966)	"Waterloo Sunset" (1967)	"Autumn Almanac" (1967)

The Kinks US singles chronology
"Mister Pleasant" (1967)	"Waterloo Sunset" (1967)	"Autumn Almanac" (1967)

Audio sample
- file; help

"Waterloo Sunset" is a song by the English rock band the Kinks. It was released as a single on 5 May 1967 and featured on the album Something Else by the Kinks in September that year. Written and produced by Kinks frontman Ray Davies, "Waterloo Sunset" is one of the band's best-known and most acclaimed songs, and was ranked number 14 on the 2021 edition of Rolling Stone's 500 Greatest Songs of All Time list. It was also their first single that was available in true stereo.

"Waterloo Sunset" reached number 2 on the British charts in mid-1967. It was a top 10 hit in Australia, New Zealand and most of Europe. While also released as a single in North America, it failed to chart there.

== History ==
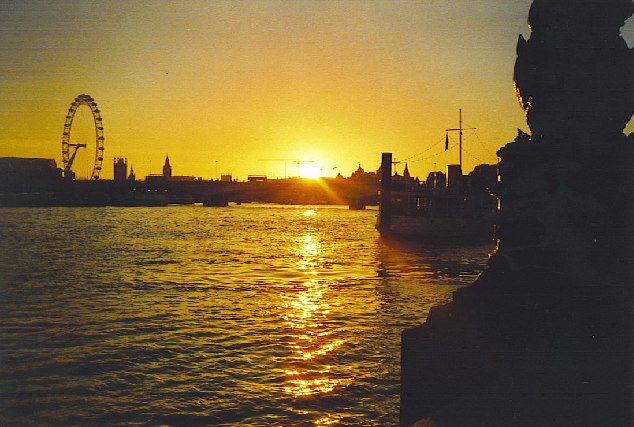
A sunset over Waterloo, London, taken from the Victoria Embankment in 2001

Interviewed in May 1967, Ray Davies stated that he wrote "Waterloo Sunset" having had "the actual melody line in my head for two or three years". He initially titled the song "Liverpool Sunset", but scrapped the Liverpool theme after the release of the Beatles' song "Penny Lane". (Note: In a 2010 interview with the Liverpool Echo, Davies elaborated: "Liverpool is my favourite city... ...I was inspired by Merseybeat. I'd fallen in love with Liverpool by that point. On every tour, that was the best reception. We played The Cavern, all those old places, and I couldn't get enough of it. I had a load of mates in bands up there, and that sound – not the Beatles but Merseybeat – that was unbelievable. It used to inspire me every time. So I wrote "Liverpool Sunset". Later it got changed to "Waterloo Sunset", but there's still that play on words with Waterloo. London was home, I'd grown up there, but I like to think I could be an adopted Scouser. My heart is definitely there.")

The lyrics describe a solitary narrator watching (or imagining) two lovers passing over a bridge, reflecting on the couple, the River Thames, and Waterloo station. Speaking in 2010, Davies commented: "I didn't think to make it about Waterloo, initially, but I realised the place was so very significant in my life. I was in St Thomas' Hospital when I was really ill [when he had a tracheotomy aged 13] and the nurses would wheel me out on the balcony to look at the river. It was also about being taken down to the 1951 Festival of Britain. It's about the two characters – and the aspirations of my sisters' generation who grew up during the Second World War. It's about the world I wanted them to have. That, and then walking by the Thames with my first wife and all the dreams that we had." The two lovers in the lyric are named as Terry and Julie.

Interviewed in May 1967, Davies stated that "if you look at the song as a kind of film, I suppose Terry would be Terence Stamp and Julie would be Julie Christie", referring to the popular British film actors romantically linked at the time. Latterly, Davies has refuted this connection; in 2008, he described the song as "a fantasy about my sister going off with her boyfriend to a new world", referring to Rosy Davies, who moved to Australia in 1964.

The song was the first Kinks recording produced solely by Ray Davies, without longtime producer Shel Talmy; Talmy's contract with the band had expired in spring 1967. Because of its complex arrangement, the sessions for "Waterloo Sunset" lasted ten hours. Dave Davies later commented on the recording: "We spent a lot of time trying to get a different guitar sound, to get a more unique feel for the record. In the end we used a tape-delay echo, but it sounded new because nobody had done it since the 1950s. I remember Steve Marriott of the Small Faces came up and asked me how we'd got that sound. We were almost trendy for a while."

== "Act Nice and Gentle" ==
The B-side "Act Nice and Gentle" was exclusive to this single, and has been described as a plea for "some civility". It has a "country-western influence" that foreshadowed the band's 1971 album Muswell Hillbillies. The song later appeared as a bonus track on the 1998 reissue of Something Else by the Kinks.

== Legacy and accolades ==
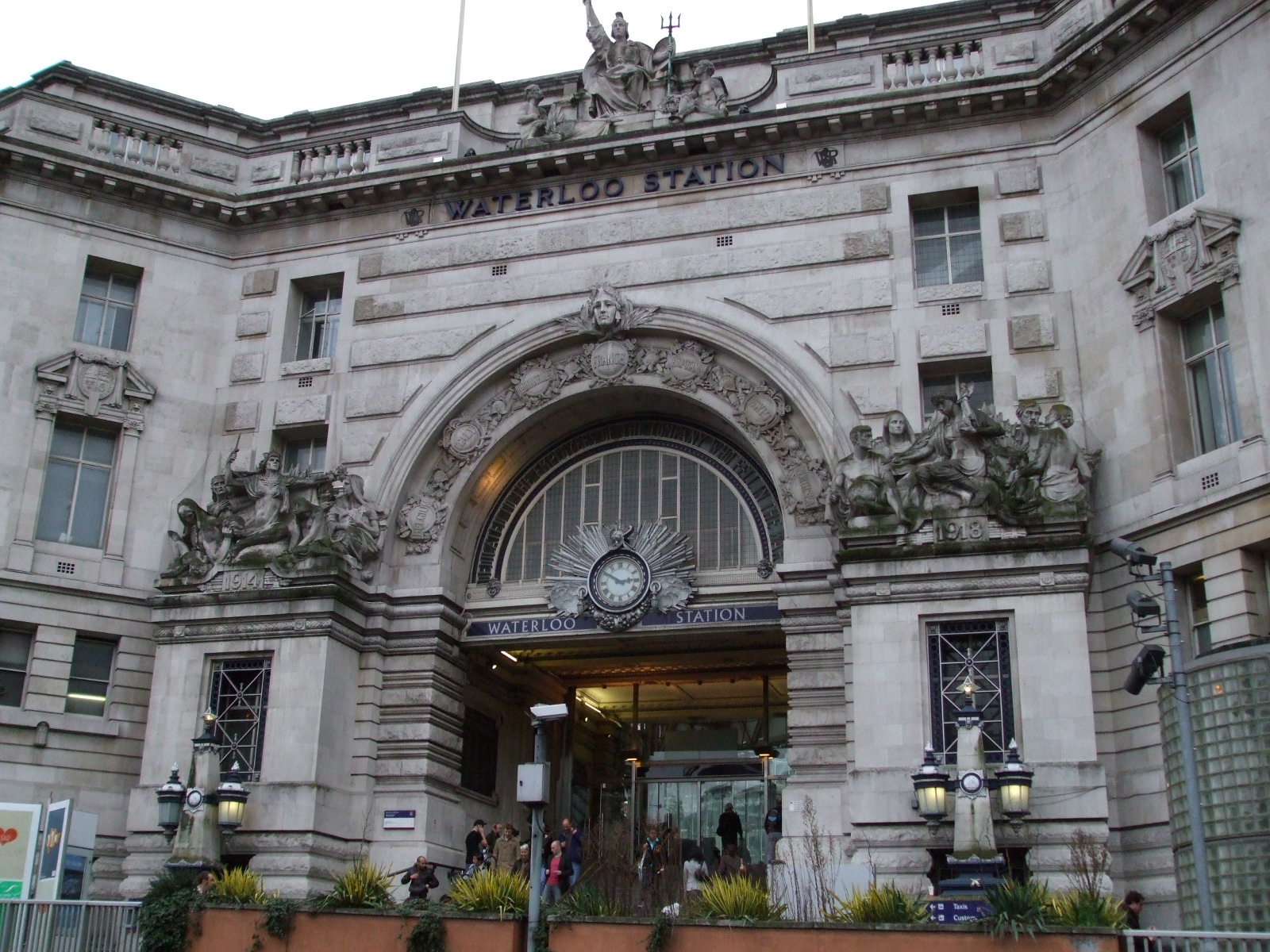
London Waterloo station

In Britain, the song is commonly considered to be Davies' most famous work, and it has been "regarded by many as the apogee of the swinging sixties". Highly esteemed for its musical and lyrical qualities, the song is commonly the subject of study in university arts courses. Davies largely dismisses such praise and has even suggested that he would like to go back and alter some of the lyrics; most professionals, however, generally side with the observation of Ken Garner, a lecturer at Glasgow Caledonian University, who said: "Davies, like all the best singer-songwriters, is intensely self-critical."

Music journalist and critic Robert Christgau has called "Waterloo Sunset" "the most beautiful song in the English language". AllMusic senior editor Stephen Thomas Erlewine concurred, citing it as "possibly the most beautiful song of the rock and roll era". In 1972, Record World said that it "may be the best thing [the Kinks have] ever done". In 2004, Rolling Stone magazine placed the song at number 42 on their list of "The 500 Greatest Songs of All Time"; it was re-ranked at number 14 on the 2021 revision of the list.

Pete Townshend of the Who described "Waterloo Sunset" as "divine" and "a masterpiece". Orchestral Manoeuvres in the Dark frontman Andy McCluskey noted the song as an inspiration, lauding "the incredible juggling act that Ray Davies achieved in combining a stunning guitar and vocal melody, backing vocals, and such beautiful but simple lyrics of classic working class urban poetry".

Ray Davies performed "Waterloo Sunset" at the closing ceremony of the 2012 Summer Olympics in London. A subsequent reissue of the Kinks' original single entered the UK charts at No. 47.

The song was used during the epilogue and end credits of the 2023 film BlackBerry, which is set in Waterloo, Ontario.

== Personnel ==
According to band researcher Doug Hinman:

The Kinks

- Ray Davies – lead and backing vocals, acoustic guitar, piano
- Dave Davies – backing vocal, electric guitar
- Pete Quaife – backing vocal, bass guitar
- Mick Avory – drums

Additional musician

- Rasa Davies – backing vocal

== Charts ==
=== Weekly charts ===
Chart (1967)	Peak position
Australia (Go-Set)	4
Australia (Kent Music Report)	4
Austria (Ö3 Austria Top 40)	10
Belgium (Ultratop 50 Flanders)	6
Belgium (Ultratop 50 Wallonia)	8
Denmark (Danmarks Radio)	5
Ireland (IRMA)	3
Netherlands (Dutch Top 40)	1
Netherlands (Single Top 100)	1
New Zealand (Listener)	7
Norway (VG-lista)	7
Rhodesia (Lyons Maid)	3
Sweden (Kvällstoppen)	14
Sweden (Tio i Topp)	4
UK Singles (Official Charts)	2
West Germany (GfK)	7

=== Year-end charts ===
Chart (1967)	Position
Belgium (Ultratop 50 Flanders)	50
Netherlands (Dutch Top 40)	33
West Germany (Musikmarkt)	33

== Certifications ==
Region	Certification	Certified units/sales
United Kingdom (BPI)	Platinum	600,000^{‡}
^{‡} Sales+streaming figures based on certification alone.

== Cathy Dennis version ==
"Waterloo Sunset"

Single by Cathy Dennis

from the album Am I the Kinda Girl?
- B-side: "Consolidation"; "Sunny Afternoon"; "I Just Love You"; "West End Pad" (alternative version)
- Released: 1997
- Length: 3:41
- Label: Polydor
- Songwriter: Ray Davies
- Producers: Cathy Dennis; Mark Saunders

Cathy Dennis singles chronology
"West End Pad" (1996)	"Waterloo Sunset" (1997)	"When Dreams Turn to Dust" (1997)

British singer-songwriter Cathy Dennis recorded a version of the song that was released as the second single from her 1997 album, Am I the Kinda Girl?. Her version peaked at number 11 on the UK Singles Chart and number seven in Iceland. Both versions of the CD single feature a cover of another Kinks song: "Sunny Afternoon".

=== Critical reception ===
British magazine Music Week rated Dennis' version three out of five. The reviewer wrote, "The approval of Ray Davies — who appears in the video — will help the cause of this cover which captures the atmosphere and laziness of The Kinks' original. This could be the hit to kick off the album Am I The Kinda Girl?." In a 1997 review, the magazine gave it two out of five, adding, "Ray Davies's song is given an unremarkable treatment by the former dance chanteuse, but television exposure should help this reach the Top 40."

=== Music video ===
The accompanying music video for "Waterloo Sunset" consists of Dennis singing the song whilst travelling alone in a taxi driven by Ray Davies in a cameo role. The scenes visible outside the taxi windows vary between the London of the 1990s and footage of various locations as they were in the 1960s.

=== Track listings ===
- UK CD1
1. "Waterloo Sunset"
2. "Consolation"
3. "Sunny Afternoon"
4. "I Just Love You"
- UK CD2
1. "Waterloo Sunset"
2. "Consolation"
3. "Sunny Afternoon"
4. "West End Pad" (Alternative Supple 7-inch) – 3:41
- UK cassette single
1. "Waterloo Sunset"
2. "Consolation"

=== Charts ===
==== Weekly charts ====
Chart (1997)	Peak position
Europe (Eurochart Hot 100)	51
Iceland (Íslenski Listinn Topp 40)	7
Scottish Singles Sales (Official Charts)	9
UK Singles (Official Charts)	11

==== Year-end charts ====
Chart (1997)	Position
Iceland (Íslenski Listinn Topp 40)	80

== Other versions ==
The song has been recorded by many other artists, including the Jam.
