= Eleanor (singer) =

American dance music singer

Eleanor Academia (born 1964 in San Diego, California), or simply known as Eleanor, is a dance music singer and producer.

== Career ==
Academia is of Filipino Hawaiian descent, and was born and raised in National City, San Diego. She went on to release her debut album entitled Jungle Wave in 1987 on Columbia Records. Singer Maurice White also guested on the album. From the LP the 1988 single "Adventure" rose to number one on the Billboard Hot Dance Music/Club Play chart. Academia also released another album, Global Conversations on Epic Records.

She would later launch her own record label known as Black Swan Records. Academia went on to release on this label her third album, Oracle of the Black Swan. She has also gone on to create, produce and host an indie radio show titled The LA Music Pipeline where she showcases independent artists.

== Discography ==
=== Albums ===
- 1987: Jungle Wave
- 1992: Global Conversations
- 1998: Oracle of the Black Swan

=== Singles ===
- 1987: "Better Safe Than Sorry"
- 1987: "Perfection (Edited Version)" (Japan release)
- 1988: "Adventure"

== See also ==
- List of number-one dance hits (United States)
- List of artists who reached number one on the U.S. dance chart
