= Everybody Move =

1991 single by Cathy Dennis

Single by Cathy Dennis

from the album Move to This
- Released: 25 November 1991
- Genre: House
- Length: 3:26
- Label: Polydor
- Songwriters: Cathy Dennis; Terry Britten; Mick Leeson
- Producers: Cathy Dennis; Phil Bodger

Cathy Dennis singles chronology
"Too Many Walls" (1991)	"Everybody Move" (1991)	"You Lied to Me" (1992)

Licensed audio
- "Everybody Move" on YouTube

"Everybody Move" is a song by British dance-pop singer-songwriter Cathy Dennis, released in November 1991 by Polydor Records as the fifth single from her debut album, Move to This (1990). Co-written and co-produced by Dennis, it was a top-30 hit in the UK, peaking at number 25. Additionally, it also reached number 90 on the US Billboard Hot 100 and number 41 on the Billboard Hot Dance Club Play chart. In Australia, the single peaked at number 85, while on the Eurochart Hot 100, it reached number 58 in January 1992. Its accompanying music video was directed by Scottish television comedy director and producer Bob Spiers.

== Critical reception ==
Alex Henderson from AllMusic felt that Dennis is "warm and convincing on such sleek and infectious dance-floor fare", as "Everybody Move". Larry Flick from Billboard magazine wrote, "After the soft and pleasing 'Too Many Walls', Dennis returns to her dance roots for an instantly contagious pop/house twirler. Already racking up club adds, fourth shot from hit-packed Move to This debut album sounds like another sure-fire multiformat smash." Marc Andrews from Smash Hits noted that here, the singer "returns to more familiar ground with this dance stormer a la 'Vogue' ('tis the season obviously). And, good news ahoy, it seems certain to provide Cathy from Norwich with the fifth hit from her five-hits-from-the-one-LP".

== Track listings ==
- UK CD single
1. "Everybody Move" (Everybody's Club Mix)
2. "Everybody Move" (Padapella)
3. "Everybody Move" (Everybody's House Mix)
4. "Everybody Move" (Everybody's House Music)

== Charts ==
Chart (1991–1992)	Peak position
Australia (ARIA)	85
Europe (Eurochart Hot 100)	58
Netherlands (Dutch Top 40)	31
Netherlands (Single Top 100)	38
UK Singles (OCC)	25
UK Airplay (Music Week)	7
UK Dance (Music Week)	46
UK Club Chart (Record Mirror)	23
US Billboard Hot 100	90
US Dance Club Songs (Billboard)	41
