= C'mon and Get My Love =

1989 single by D Mob and Cathy Dennis

Single by D Mob introducing Cathy Dennis

from the album A Little Bit of This, a Little Bit of That and Move to This
- Released: 2 October 1989
- Genre: Deep house
- Length: 3:51
- Label: FFRR
- Songwriter: D Mob
- Producer: D Mob

D Mob singles chronology
"It's Time to Get Funky" (1989)	"C'mon and Get My Love" (1989)	"Put Your Hands Together" (1990)

Cathy Dennis singles chronology
"C'mon and Get My Love" (1989)	"Just Another Dream" (1989)

Music video
- "C'mon and Get My Love" on YouTube

"C'mon and Get My Love" is a song by British dance producer D Mob from his only studio album, A Little Bit of This, a Little Bit of That (1989). It is both written and produced by D Mob and features British singer and songwriter Cathy Dennis, credited as "introducing" her. The song established Dennis as a major chart presence during the late 1980s to early 1990s and was later also included in her debut solo album, Move to This (1990). The single was released in October 1989 by FFRR Records.

"C'mon and Get My Love" peaked at number 15 on the UK Singles Chart and at number 16 in Ireland and Luxembourg. In the United States, the song crossed over to pop radio, reaching number 10 on the Billboard Hot 100. It also topped the Billboard Dance Club Play chart, becoming the biggest hit of D Mob's career and jump-starting Dennis' career as a solo artist. A music video was also created for the song, directed by Marek Budzynski.

== Critical reception ==
Alex Henderson of AllMusic stated that the "more melodic and accessible nature of 'deep house' is evident" on the song. He also named it a "very addictive" club hit that features "likeable dance diva" Cathy Dennis. Bill Coleman from Billboard magazine praised it as "a tasty pop-inflected club track pumping a generous instrumental and lyrical hook." Selina Webb from Music Week wrote, "The trends keep on coming but D-Mob seem to have lost the edge with this one. OK, the catchy bits have been pretty blatant so far, but this girlie-crooned bass pumper needs hefty dancefloor blasting before it catches on. Uplifts the spirits and all that, but too late to inspire."

== Music video ==
The accompanying music video for "C'mon and Get My Love" was directed by Marek Budzynski, and garnered heavy MTV rotation. It depicts D-Mob as a film director on set, with Dennis and two female dancers performing in front of large blue letters that spell out 'D-MOB'. In between, the director and other men on the set also joins in on the dance. Sheila Rogers from Calgary Herald complimented the video as "infectious".

== Track listings ==
- 7-inch, mini-CD, and Australasian cassette single
1. "C'mon and Get My Love" – 3:50
2. "C'mon and Get My Love" (TV mix) – 3:43
- Non-US 12-inch single

A. "C'mon and Get My Love" (Dance Hall mix)
B. "C'mon and Get My Love" (Spaghetti Western mix)

- European CD single
1. "C'mon and Get My Love" (7-inch version)
2. "C'mon and Get My Love" (Dance Hall mix)
3. "C'mon and Get My Love" (Keys II My Love mix featuring Jools Holland)
- US cassette single

A. "C'mon and Get My Love" (7-inch mix) – 3:50
B. "C'mon and Get My Love" (12-inch remix) – 6:15

- US 12-inch single

A1. "C'mon and Get My Love" (Dance Hall mix) – 7:52
A2. "C'mon and Get My Love" (Keys II My Love mix featuring Jools Holland) – 5:20
A3. "C'mon and Get My Love" (7-inch mix) – 3:50
B1. "C'mon and Get My Love" (12-inch remix) – 6:15
B2. "C'mon and Get My Love" (Second Coming mix) – 5:12
B3. "C'mon and Get My Love" (acapella mix) – 3:40

- Canadian 12-inch and maxi-cassette single

A1. "C'mon and Get My Love" (Dance Hall mix) – 7:36
A2. "C'mon and Get My Love" (Keys II My Love mix featuring Jools Holland) – 5:22
A3. "C'mon and Get My Love" (Second Coming mix) – 5:06
B1. "C'mon and Get My Love" (Spaghetti Western mix) – 7:52
B2. "C'mon and Get My Love" (acapella version) – 3:42
B3. "C'mon and Get My Love" (single version) – 3:50

== Charts ==
=== Weekly charts ===
Chart (1989–1990)	Peak position
Australia (ARIA)	35
Canada Top Singles (RPM)	45
Canada Dance/Urban (RPM)	6
Europe (Eurochart Hot 100)	43
Ireland (IRMA)	16
Israel (Israeli Singles Chart)	11
Luxembourg (Radio Luxembourg)	16
New Zealand (Recorded Music NZ)	22
Quebec (ADISQ)	37
UK Singles (Official Charts)	15
US Billboard Hot 100	10
US 12-inch Singles Sales (Billboard)	3
US Dance Club Play (Billboard)	1
US Hot R&B/Hip-Hop Songs (Billboard)	69

=== Year-end charts ===
Chart (1990)	Position
US Billboard Hot 100	85
US 12-inch Singles Sales (Billboard)	16
US Dance Club Play (Billboard)	6

== Release history ==
Region	Date	Format(s)	Label(s)	Ref.
United Kingdom	2 October 1989	7-inch vinyl; 12-inch vinyl; CD; cassette	FFRR	
Australia	12 February 1990	7-inch vinyl; 12-inch vinyl; cassette	FFRR	
Japan	25 March 1990	Mini-CD	London; FFRR	

== See also ==
- List of number-one dance hits (United States)
