= Rockers Revenge =

Musical project

- Genres: Freestyle; post-disco; electro
- Years active: 1982–1984
- Label: Streetwise
- Past members: Donnie Calvin; Arthur Baker; Dwight Hawkes; Tina B

Rockers Revenge was a studio musical project, assembled by producer Arthur Baker in 1982. The group is most remembered by their 1982 post-disco hit "Walking on Sunshine", which peaked at number 1 on the US Dance Chart and number 4 in the UK.

== Biography ==
The project was a collaboration of record producer Arthur Baker and reggae vocalist Donnie Calvin. Baker primarily focused on the engineering and mixing while Donnie provided lead vocals. Tina B, who is married to Arthur Baker, contributed with backing vocals, writing and arrangement. There was also a backing vocalist called Dwight Hawkes. The group experimented with early elements of freestyle music.

The dance club mixes were created by Jellybean Benitez. The group's initial entry on the Hot Dance Club Play chart, "Walking on Sunshine" (an Eddy Grant composition, featuring vocals by Donnie Calvin) hit #1 on the U.S. dance chart in 1982. The track reached #4 in the UK Singles Chart in September 1982. Follow-ups "The Harder They Come" (1983) and "Living for the Weekend" (1984) also charted.

The project disbanded in 1984, due to the lack of chart success. Arthur moved to other projects and Donnie retired from his music career.

In 1988, a Rockers Revenge track ("Love Is on Our Side") appeared on Rough House Vol. 1, an early house music compilation album. In early 2005, "Walking on Sunshine" was re-released on the Gossip U.S. record label, featuring remixes by Hott 22 and Live Element. Another Rockers Revenge track called "Battle Cry" was featured in the film Beat Street and its soundtrack album.

== Discography ==
=== Albums ===
- The Streetwise Sessions (2017)

=== Singles ===
Year	Title	Peak chart positions			Certifications
Year	Title	US Dance	US R&B	UK	Certifications
1982	"Sunshine Partytime"	—	—	―	
1982	"Walking on Sunshine"	1	63	4	BPI: Silver
1983	"The Harder They Come"	13	―	30	
1983	"There Goes My Heart"	—	69	—	
1984	"Battle Cry"	—	—	—	
1984	"Living for the Weekend (Let's Work)"	52	—	—	
"—" denotes releases that did not chart or were not released in that territory.

== See also ==
- List of number-one dance hits (United States)
- List of artists who reached number one on the US Dance chart
