= Just Another Dream =

1989 single by Cathy Dennis

Single by Cathy Dennis

from the album Move to This
- Released: 6 November 1989
- Genre: House; dance-pop; disco
- Length: 3:45 (1989 single version); 4:03 (1990 single version); 4:26 (album version)
- Label: Polydor
- Songwriters: Cathy Dennis; Daniel Kojo Poku
- Producer: Dancin' Danny D

Cathy Dennis singles chronology
"C'mon and Get My Love" (1989)	"Just Another Dream" (1989)	"That's the Way of the World" (1990)

Music video
- "Just Another Dream" on YouTube

"Just Another Dream" is a song by English singer-songwriter Cathy Dennis, first released in the United Kingdom as her solo debut single in November 1989, by Polydor Records. The following year, it was remixed and included on Dennis' first album, Move to This (1990), and re-released as a single, becoming a top-10 hit in the United States. The song was co-written by Dancin' Danny D (real name Daniel Kojo Poku), a.k.a. D Mob, who also produced the track and sang backing vocals. Poku's vocals are often mistaken for Rick Astley. Two different music videos were produced for the song, directed by Russell Young and Greg Masuak.

== Chart performance ==
When "Just Another Dream" was first released in 1989, it charted on the UK Singles Chart for two weeks in December 1989, peaking at number 93. In 1990, the song was remixed by Shep Pettibone (credit for the mix is shared with Dancin' Danny D) and released in July of that year on Dennis' debut album, Move to This.

In September 1990, a shortened edit of the album remix was released as a single in the United States (an edit that also appeared on some album releases of Move to This). It reached the Billboard Hot 100 in January 1991, peaking at number nine on 2 February 1991. It also peaked at number two for three weeks on the Billboard dance charts.

"Just Another Dream" was then released in the UK again in July 1991, with the same version and artwork as the US single release. This time it received substantial radio airplay and peaked at number 13, remaining on the chart for seven weeks.

== Critical reception ==
Alex Henderson of AllMusic named the song one of the high points of Move to This. Larry Flick from Billboard magazine wrote, "Singer who enlivened D-Mob's pop hit 'C'mon and Get My Love' steps into the solo spotlight with this disco-styled house cut, which has already received clubland kudos as an import. Guided by D-Mob mastermind Dancin' Danny D, Dennis' star power is undeniable as she romps through the tune with unabashed charm and confidence. Sounds like a multiformat smash." Elysa Gardner from Entertainment Weekly felt its "percolating" production "is the real star here".

A reviewer from Music & Media described it as "quality commercial dance-pop. The groove stands tall while the sweet melodic pop melody seems just right for Dennis's fresh girl-next-door vocals. Kylie in clubland." Dele Fadele from NME wrote, "In many ways, this is the ultimate dancing-round-your-handbag disco shaker." John Mackie from The Vancouver Sun remarked that the singer-songwriter "injects a little bit of soul into the mix, soul that lifts songs like 'Just Another Dream', 'Too Many Walls' and 'My Beating Heart' high above the standards set by most modern dance music."

== Music video ==
Two different music videos were produced for the different releases. The first was directed by Russell Young and released in 1990. The second was directed by Gregg Masuak and released in 1991.

== Track listings ==
- UK CD single (first release)
1. "Just Another Dream" (Danny D 7-inch edit)
2. "Just Another Dream" (Funky Love mix)
3. "Just Another Dream" (Paul Simpson US remix)
- US CD single
1. "Just Another Dream" (7-inch)
2. "Just Another Dream" (club mix)
3. "Just Another Dream" (The Dream mix)
4. "Just Another Dream" (Paul Simpson US remix)
5. "Just Another Dream" (Funky Love mix)
- UK CD single (second release)
1. "Just Another Dream" (12-inch version)
2. "Just Another Dream" (7-inch mix)
3. "Just Another Dream" (alternative bass dub version)

== Charts ==
=== Weekly charts ===
Chart (1989–1991)	Peak position
Australia (ARIA)	14
Canada Top Singles (RPM)	20
Europe (Eurochart Hot 100)	25
Germany (GfK)	47
Ireland (IRMA)	17
Israel (Israeli Singles Chart)	7
Luxembourg (Radio Luxembourg)	10
New Zealand (Recorded Music NZ)	38
UK Singles (Official Charts)	13
UK Airplay (Music Week)	7
UK Dance (Music Week)	20
UK Club Chart (Record Mirror)	17
US Billboard Hot 100	9
US Dance Club Songs (Billboard)	2
US Dance Singles Sales (Billboard)	2
US Cash Box Top 100	10

=== Year-end charts ===
Chart (1991)	Position
Australia (ARIA)	68
US Billboard Hot 100	87
US 12-inch Singles Sales (Billboard)	20
US Dance Club Play (Billboard)	50

== Release history ==
Region	Date	Format(s)	Label(s)	Ref.
United Kingdom	6 November 1989	7-inch vinyl; 12-inch vinyl	Polydor	
United Kingdom (first re-release)	8 October 1990	7-inch vinyl; 12-inch vinyl; CD; cassette	Polydor	
Australia	21 January 1991	7-inch vinyl; 12-inch vinyl	Polydor	
Japan	25 January 1991	Mini-CD	Polydor	
Australia	4 February 1991	CD; cassette	Polydor	
United Kingdom (second re-release)	8 July 1991	7-inch vinyl; 12-inch vinyl; CD; cassette	Polydor	
