= D Mob =

British music producer and remixer

- Also known as: Dancin' Danny D, Danny Poku, Danny D
- Born: Daniel Kojo Poku; 26 May 1963 (age 63); Cobridge, Stoke-on-Trent, Staffordshire, England
- Genres: Hip house; dance-pop; R&B; acid house
- Occupations: Record producer; remixer
- Years active: 1988–present
- Label: FFRR

Daniel Kojo Poku (born 26 May 1963), also known by various stage names including D Mob (or D-Mob), Dancin' Danny D or simply Danny D , is a British music producer and remixer. His most notable tracks were "We Call It Acieed" (1988), which helped popularize acid house music during the Second Summer of Love, and "C'mon and Get My Love" (1990) with Cathy Dennis, which reached number 10 on the US Billboard Hot 100.

== Biography ==
The 1988 hit single "We Call It Acieed" reached No. 3 on the UK Singles Chart, and was one of a wave of acid house singles to enjoy success that year during the Second Summer of Love. The video was directed by Marek Budzynski. D Mob went on to have a further three top twenty singles in the UK during 1989 and 1990; "It Is Time to Get Funky", which reached No. 9, "C'mon and Get My Love", which reached No. 15, and "Put Your Hands Together", which reached No. 7.

In the late 1980s and early 1990s, D Mob charted five songs on the US Hot Dance Music/Club Play chart, four of which went to No. 1, including "We Call It Acieed", "It Is Time to Get Funky", "C'mon and Get My Love" (with Cathy Dennis), and "That's the Way of the World" (also with Dennis). In the U.S., they are best known for the hit "C'mon and Get My Love" featuring Dennis as vocalist, that crossed over to pop radio and hit No. 10 on the Billboard Hot 100 in 1990.

Aside from Dennis, Dancin' Danny D has collaborated with Dannii Minogue, Gary Haisman and London Rhyme Syndicate (LRS).

Danny D, together with Tim Blacksmith, founded the publishing company Stellar Songs, as well as Tim & Danny Music, a company which has worked with Charli XCX, Emeli Sande and Labyrinth in the past. The duo are known for managing the Norwegian production team Stargate, as well as being the executive producers for hits produced by them.

In 2022, Danny D and Tim Blacksmith were both made MBEs in the Queen's Jubilee Birthday Honours List for their services to music.

== Discography ==
=== Albums ===
Year	Album	Peak positions	
Year	Album	UK	AUS
1989	A Little Bit of This, a Little Bit of That	46	72

=== Singles ===
Year	Title	Peak positions										Album
Year	Title	UK	AUS	AUT	GER	IRE	NED	NZ	SWI	US	US Dance	Album
1988	"We Call It Acieed" (featuring Gary Haisman)	3	85	—	22	16	42	—	—	—	1	A Little Bit of This, a Little Bit of That
1989	"It Is Time to Get Funky" (featuring LRS and DC Sarome)	9	—	—	—	17	—	—	—	—	1	A Little Bit of This, a Little Bit of That
1989	"C'mon and Get My Love" (introducing Cathy Dennis)	15	35	—	—	16	—	22	—	10	1	A Little Bit of This, a Little Bit of That
1989	"Put Your Hands Together" (featuring Nuff Juice)	7	71	22	23	15	16	—	28	—	13	A Little Bit of This, a Little Bit of That
1990	"That's the Way of the World" (with Cathy Dennis)	48	98	—	—	28	—	35	—	59	1	A Little Bit of This, a Little Bit of That
1994	"Why" (with Cathy Dennis)	23	—	—	—	—	—	—	—	—	—	Non-album singles
1994	"One Day"	41	—	—	—	—	—	—	—	—	—	Non-album singles
"—" denotes releases that did not chart or were not released.

== See also ==
- List of Billboard number-one dance club songs
- List of artists who reached number one on the U.S. Dance Club Songs chart
- List of songs banned by the BBC
- List of Polydor Records artists
- List of house music artists
- List of performances on Top of the Pops
- List of 1990s one-hit wonders in the United States
