= Touch Me (All Night Long) =

1984 single by Fonda Rae

Single by Fonda Rae
- Released: 1984
- Genre: Freestyle; electro; post-disco
- Length: 9:32
- Label: KN; Streetwave
- Songwriters: Greg Carmichael; Patrick Adams
- Producers: Greg Carmichael; Patrick Adams

Fonda Rae singles chronology
| "Live It Up" (1983) | "Touch Me (All Night Long)" (1984) | "Making Love Feel So Good in the Morning" (1985) |

"Touch Me (All Night Long)" is a 1984 song by American singer Fonda Rae and American band Wish. It was a minor hit for Rae and the band, and was featured in the 1985 slasher film A Nightmare on Elm Street 2: Freddy's Revenge. In the original, it is alternately spelled as "Tuch Me (All Night Long)" or simply just "Tuch Me".

== Track listing and formats ==
- US 12-inch vinyl single
1. Tuch Me (All Night Long) – 9:32
2. Tuch Me (All Night Long) radio version – 3:34
3. Tuch Me (All Night Long) dub version – 7:25
- UK 12-inch vinyl single
1. Tuch Me (All Night Long) – 9:32
2. Tuch Me (All Night Long) short version – 4:34
3. Tuch Me (All Night Long) special mix for break dancing – 7:25

== Charts ==
| Chart (1984–1985) | Peak position |
|---|---|
| UK Singles (OCC) | 49 |
| US Dance Club Songs (Billboard) | 5 |
| US Hot R&B/Hip-Hop Songs (Billboard) | 70 |

== Cathy Dennis version ==
"Touch Me (All Night Long)"

Single by Cathy Dennis

from the album Move to This
- Released: January 14, 1991
- Genre: Dance-pop; house
- Length: 4:01
- Label: Polydor
- Songwriters: Cathy Dennis; Carmichael Gregory; Patrick Adams
- Producers: Cathy Dennis; Phil Bodger

Cathy Dennis singles chronology
| "That's the Way of the World" (1990) | "Touch Me (All Night Long)" (1991) | "Too Many Walls" (1991) |

Music video
- "Touch Me (All Night Long)" on YouTube

A cover of "Touch Me (All Night Long)" was released by British singer and songwriter Cathy Dennis on Polydor Records on January 14, 1991, as the third single from her debut studio album, Move to This (1990), where it is listed as either "Touch Me (All Night Long)" or "All Night Long (Touch Me)". Her version, co-produced by Dennis with Phil Bodger, contains some rewritten lyrics in the verses. It was a number-one hit on the US Billboard Dance Club Play chart and peaked at number two on the Billboard Hot 100. Dennis performed the song on the season three episode of Beverly Hills, 90210, "A Night to Remember", in 1993. The accompanying music video for “Touch Me (All Night Long)" was directed by Rocky Morton and Annabel Jankel.

=== Critical reception ===
Larry Flick from Billboard magazine described the song as a "house-savvy rendition of the Fonda Rae disco nugget." He stated that it is a "fine showcase for Dennis's bright and chirpy vocal style." Dave Sholin from the Gavin Report wrote that "after hearing this track, there's every reason to believe she'll be travelling up the chart again." He also added that as co-writer and co-producer, "this exciting vocalist creates mature dance music that can entertain young and older audiences alike." James Hamilton from Record Mirror stated that "now she will surely be huge with this Shep Pettibone mixed US smash breezily striding Fonda Rae revival".

=== Chart performance ===
"Touch Me (All Night Long)" peaked at number one in Zimbabwe, number two in Luxembourg, number nine in Canada, number five in the United Kingdom and number three in Ireland. In the United States, "Touch Me" reached number two on the Billboard Hot 100 on the week of May 18, 1991. In addition, "Touch Me" spent one week at the top of the US Dance Club Play chart in March 1991, becoming her biggest hit in the country.

=== Impact and legacy ===
BuzzFeed ranked Dennis' version of "Touch Me (All Night Long)" at number 19 in their list of "The 101 Greatest Dance Songs of the '90s" in 2017. In 2019, Billboard ranked it at number 188 in their ranking of "Billboard's Top Songs of the '90s". In 2020, Slant Magazine ranked the song at number 89 in their list of "The 100 Best Dance Songs of All Time". They wrote, "...Cathy Dennis made Fonda Rae's disco trifle 'Touch Me (All Night Long)' her own by completely rewriting the song's throwaway verses, imbuing a fleeting physical connection with the weight of manifest destiny. DJ extraordinaire Shep Pettibone likewise put his signature on the track by amping up the melodic hook and distinctive Roland 909 house beats, propelling it into the stratosphere of early-'90s house-pop."

=== Track listing and formats ===
- US 7-inch vinyl and cassette single
1. Touch Me (All Night Long) 7-inch mix – 3:28
2. Touch Me (All Night Long) Hot mix – 4:01
- US 12-inch vinyl single
1. Touch Me (All Night Long) club mix – 7:17
2. Touch Me (All Night Long) All Night Long mix – 6:46
3. Touch Me (All Night Long) 7-inch mix – 3:28
4. Touch Me (All Night Long) Touch This – 7:47
5. Touch Me (All Night Long) Rhodesapella mix – 4:06
6. Touch Me (All Night Long) Dub All Night Long – 5:21
- UK CD maxi-single
1. Touch Me (All Night Long) 7-inch mix – 3:28
2. Touch Me (All Night Long) club mix – 7:17
3. Touch Me (All Night Long) All Night Long mix – 6:46

=== Charts ===
==== Weekly charts ====
| Chart (1991) | Peak position |
|---|---|
| Australia (ARIA) | 16 |
| Austria (Ö3 Austria Top 40) | 30 |
| Belgium (Ultratop 50 Flanders) | 29 |
| Canada Top Singles (RPM) | 9 |
| Canada Dance/Urban (RPM) | 2 |
| Europe (Eurochart Hot 100) | 8 |
| Europe (European Hit Radio) | 10 |
| Finland (Suomen virallinen singlelista) | 25 |
| Germany (GfK) | 39 |
| Ireland (IRMA) | 3 |
| Israel (Israeli Singles Chart) | 4 |
| Luxembourg (Radio Luxembourg) | 2 |
| Netherlands (Dutch Top 40) | 33 |
| Netherlands (Single Top 100) | 26 |
| New Zealand (Recorded Music NZ) | 34 |
| Switzerland (Schweizer Hitparade) | 16 |
| UK Singles (Official Charts) | 5 |
| UK Airplay (Music Week) | 3 |
| UK Dance (Music Week) | 2 |
| UK Club Chart (Record Mirror) | 2 |
| US Billboard Hot 100 | 2 |
| US Dance Club Songs (Billboard) | 1 |
| US Dance Singles Sales (Billboard) | 1 |
| US Cash Box Top 100 | 5 |
| Zimbabwe (ZIMA) | 1 |

==== Year-end charts ====
| Chart (1991) | Position |
|---|---|
| Australia (ARIA) | 98 |
| Canada Top Singles (RPM) | 75 |
| Canada Dance/Urban (RPM) | 9 |
| Europe (European Hit Radio) | 74 |
| UK Singles (OCC) | 60 |
| UK Club Chart (Record Mirror) | 20 |
| US Billboard Hot 100 | 30 |
| US 12-inch Singles Sales (Billboard) | 11 |
| US Dance Club Play (Billboard) | 33 |
| US Cash Box Top 100 | 29 |

=== Release history ===
| Region | Date | Format(s) | Label(s) | Ref. |
|---|---|---|---|---|
| United States | January 14, 1991 | 7-inch vinyl; 12-inch vinyl; cassette | Polydor | |
| United Kingdom | April 22, 1991 | 7-inch vinyl; 12-inch vinyl; CD; cassette | Polydor | |
| Japan | April 25, 2991 | Mini-CD | Polydor | |
| Australia | May 27, 1991 | CD; cassette | Polydor | |
| Australia | June 10, 1991 | 7-inch vinyl | Polydor | |
| Australia | June 24, 1991 | 12-inch vinyl | Polydor | |

== Other versions ==
"Touch Me (All Night Long)" was released in 2004 by electronic dance group Angel City from their debut studio album, Love Me Right. The band was formed by Zentveld & Oomen. It was the follow-up to the group's 2003 single, "Love Me Right (Oh Sheila)". It reached number two on the UK dance charts and number 18 on the UK Singles Chart. It shares the chorus from Cathy Dennis's 1991 hit single "Touch Me (All Night Long)", but has different verses. "Touch Me (Radio Edit)" was released in 2015 by former singer-songwriter Lauren Ashleigh. It never entered any charts but was regularly played on BBC Essex and Kiss FM.

=== Samples ===
"Touch Me (All Night Long)" was sampled in 2024 in the song "All Night Long" by French DJs Kungs and David Guetta, and British-Ethiopian singer Izzy Bizu.

==== Weekly charts ====
2024 weekly chart performance for "All Night Long"
| Chart (2024) | Peak position |
|---|---|
| Serbia Airplay (Radiomonitor) | 7 |

== See also ==
- List of number-one dance singles of 1991 (U.S.)
