= Too Many Walls =

1991 single by Cathy Dennis

Single by Cathy Dennis

from the album Move to This
- Released: June 1991
- Genre: Pop
- Length: 4:38 (album version); 4:24 (radio edit)
- Label: Polydor
- Songwriters: Cathy Dennis; Anne Dudley
- Producers: Cathy Dennis; Phil Bodger

Cathy Dennis singles chronology
"Touch Me (All Night Long)" (1991)	"Too Many Walls" (1991)	"Everybody Move" (1991)

Licensed audio
- "Too Many Walls" on YouTube

"Too Many Walls" is a song by British singer-songwriter Cathy Dennis. A midtempo pop ballad, it was co-written by Dennis and Anne Dudley, member of the avant-garde synthpop musical group Art of Noise. The song was originally a composition of Dudley's with strings but no lyrics, until Dennis adapted the song and added words before it appeared on her debut album. The song was then remixed into a more radio-friendly version before being released as a single, first in the United States in June 1991, then in Australia and the United Kingdom that September.

The song became Dennis' fourth top-10 hit on the US Billboard Hot 100, on which it peaked at number eight and lasted for 20 weeks. "Too Many Walls" also spent two weeks atop the Billboard Hot Adult Contemporary Tracks chart. In the UK, the song reached number 17 on the UK Singles Chart in October, and in Canada, it peaked at number 10 in September. The music video was filmed at the then-newly opened terminal building at London Stansted Airport, and directed by Rocky Morton and Annabel Jankel.

== Content ==
In an interview with Rolling Stone magazine, Dennis stated that she thinks the ballad is "the best song on the album, especially in terms of lyrics. The other songs are fun, but they can be quite vacant." She said the song is "about when you want to be together with someone, but other people's opinions and prejudices get in the way."

== Critical reception ==
Larry Flick from Billboard magazine wrote, "After a pair of top 10 dance tunes, Dennis drops the tempo for a nicely sung, sugary ballad. Will likely keep popsters in tow, while broadening base to include AC programmers." Mark Frith from Smash Hits commented, "...this is Cathy's big ballad, a perfect end-of-summer song whether you're pining for Pedro from the Spanish swimming pool or that person with the nice eyes you met in Bridlington. 'Too Many Walls' is a lush, low-key ballad that is the high-spot of her album and quite obviously from the heart as well."

== Track listings ==
- UK CD single
1. "Too Many Walls"
2. "Too Many Walls" (L'autre Mix)
3. "Too Many Walls" (a cappella)
- US cassette single
1. "Too Many Walls" (Radio Mix)
2. "Too Many Walls" (a cappella)

== Charts ==
=== Weekly charts ===
Chart (1991)	Peak position
Australia (ARIA)	57
Canada Top Singles (RPM)	10
Canada Adult Contemporary (RPM)	5
Europe (Eurochart Hot 100)	51
Europe (European Hit Radio)	13
Germany (GfK)	58
Ireland (IRMA)	17
UK Singles (Official Charts)	17
UK Airplay (Music Week)	1
US Billboard Hot 100	8
US Adult Contemporary (Billboard)	1
US Cash Box Top 100	11

=== Year-end charts ===
Chart (1991)	Position
Canada Top Singles (RPM)	72
Canada Adult Contemporary (RPM)	62
Europe (European Hit Radio)	83
US Billboard Hot 100	74
US Adult Contemporary (Billboard)	29

== Release history ==
Region	Date	Format(s)	Label(s)	Ref.
United States	June 1991	Contemporary hit; adult contemporary radio	Polydor	
Australia	2 September 1991	CD; cassette	Polydor	
United Kingdom	23 September 1991	7-inch vinyl	Polydor	
Japan	6 November 1991	Mini-CD	Polydor	
