= Cathy Dennis =

British singer, songwriter and producer

- Born: Catherine Dennis
- Genres: Pop; house; dance
- Occupations: Singer; songwriter; record producer
- Instruments: Vocals; keyboards
- Years active: 1989–present
- Labels: Polydor; Polygram
- Formerly of: D Mob
- Website: cathydennisofficial.com

Catherine Dennis is a British singer, songwriter and record producer. She was discovered as a teenager by music manager Simon Fuller, which led to her featuring on the hit dance single "C'mon and Get My Love" with D Mob in 1989.

In the early 1990s, Dennis saw international solo success with her debut album Move to This (1990), which included three US top-ten singles including "Just Another Dream" and "Touch Me (All Night Long)"; the latter peaked at number two and remains her signature song. It was followed by the albums Into the Skyline (1992) and Am I the Kinda Girl? (1996), her final release, which included a cover of the Kinks' "Waterloo Sunset" that reached number 11 in the UK.

Dennis pivoted to songwriting in the 2000s and became renowned for her work, scoring eight UK number ones and seven Billboard top ten singles. She has also gained three Grammy nominations (two wins), and been awarded six Ivor Novello Awards. Her co-credits include the multi-platinum singles "Can't Get You Out of My Head" by Kylie Minogue, "Toxic" by Britney Spears, and "I Kissed a Girl" by Katy Perry. In 2006, she won the UK music industry's Woman of the Year Award.

== Performing career ==
=== 1989–1991: Move to This ===
Dennis achieved her first success as a vocalist with D Mob, when their single "C'mon and Get My Love" (which was credited as "introducing" Dennis) reached No. 15 on the UK Singles Chart and No. 10 on the Billboard Hot 100 in 1989. It is regarded as an underground classic in the dance music field, and a second collaboration with D Mob, "That's the Way of the World", was also a hit. It was followed by Dennis's debut album, Move to This. She subsequently scored three solo hits, all of which reached the UK top 20 and the US top 10. She enjoyed considerable success in Japan in the early 1990s. The three solo hits were: "Just Another Dream" (UK No. 13, US No. 9, Australia No. 14), which featured D Mob on backing vocals; a cover of the Wish and Fonda Rae 1984 club hit "Touch Me (All Night Long)" (UK No. 5, US No. 2, Australia No. 16), which is probably her most remembered hit to date; and "Too Many Walls" (UK No. 17, US No. 8, Australia No. 57).

"Touch Me (All Night Long)" stayed at No. 2 on the Billboard Hot 100 for two weeks, and was kept out of the No. 1 spot by Hi-Five's "I Like the Way (The Kissing Game)" in the first week, and Mariah Carey's "I Don't Wanna Cry" in the second week. The song is a cover and lyrical reworking of the 1984 single by Wish featuring Fonda Rae, which had peaked at No. 70 on the US R&B chart that year. "Touch Me (All Night Long)" reached No. 1 on the US Hot Dance Club Play chart, and its follow-up, "Too Many Walls", which Dennis co-wrote with Anne Dudley of Art of Noise (who also co-wrote the ABC track "All of My Heart"), was a No. 1 Adult Contemporary hit in the United States. It was around this time that Dennis agreed to join Club MTV's first tour, booked for six weeks. In an interview on the late-night show Into the Night Starring Rick Dees, she explained she dropped out after three days, accusing one of Milli Vanilli's members (the tour's headline act) of sexual harassment. During this period, she recorded a song called "Find the Key to Your Life" with David Morales, for the soundtrack to the film Teenage Mutant Ninja Turtles II: The Secret of the Ooze. Subsequent releases were only minor hits.

=== 1992–1993: Into the Skyline ===
Dennis released her second album, Into the Skyline, in September 1992, written with a focus toward the US market. The album featured the singles "You Lied to Me", "Irresistible", "Moments of Love", "Falling", and "Why" – the latter was credited to D Mob with Dennis. The album got to No. 8 on the UK Albums Chart, whilst on the US Billboard Hot 100, "You Lied to Me" was a top 40 hit - her final American top 40 single as a performer - and "Irresistible" made the Adult Contemporary top 10; however, the album never charted. Dennis experienced a brief peak of fame, making a cameo in Beverly Hills, 90210 singing the songs "Moments of Love" (a minor US Adult Contemporary chart hit), "Why" (in the episode, not to feature D Mob) and "Touch Me (All Night Long)". In Japan, the album was called Into the Skyline +1, and featured three extra tracks: "Nothing Moves Me", a previous B-side, and two tracks that were both released as singles, "It's My Style", and "Love's a Cradle". She also provided background vocals on PM Dawn's US top 10 and UK top 20 hit "Looking through Patient Eyes", released in 1993. In that same year, she sang a duet with Lance Ellington on the soundtrack of Robin Hood: Men in Tights.

=== 1994–1997: Shelved album Inspiration and Am I the Kinda Girl? ===
Dennis began to record a third album, Inspiration. The title track was recorded with Todd Terry, along with another song "Is There Life After You". Only one song from the recording sessions was ever released, "S.O.S.", which can be found on the Beverly Hills 90210: The College Years soundtrack. She wrote her first song for another artist, for Dannii Minogue titled "Love's on Every Corner".

In 1996, Dennis changed her musical style from the dance-pop sound of previous releases to a more traditional singer-songwriter approach. The resulting album, Am I the Kinda Girl?, was more in keeping with the Britpop sound of bands such as Blur and performers such as Stephen Duffy, and featured collaborations with Guy Chambers of the Lemon Trees and Andy Partridge of XTC. Three singles from the album were released: "West End Pad" (UK No. 25), "Waterloo Sunset" - a cover of the Kinks' song (UK No. 11), and her last solo single, "When Your Dreams Turn to Dust" (UK No. 43).

=== 1998–present: Songwriting for other artists ===
In 2001, Kylie Minogue had a worldwide hit with the Dennis and Rob Davis penned song "Can't Get You Out of My Head". The following year, Dennis won the Best Dance Recording Grammy for writing "Come into My World". She followed that up with Britney Spears's hit song "Toxic" which also won the Grammy for Best Dance Recording. Dennis had a string of hits with S Club 7; she wrote almost all their hit singles such as "Never Had a Dream Come True", and also worked on the singles for the spin-off group S Club Juniors which was a younger version of S Club 7. Dennis wrote hit songs for Céline Dion, Delta Goodrem, and for Hear'Say and Bardot. She also wrote the fastest selling debut single in UK history for recording artist Will Young, the winner of the British music competition reality show Pop Idol, and for runner-up Gareth Gates. Dennis wrote the theme song to the television series American Idol. She wrote several songs for former S Club 7 member Rachel Stevens including "Sweet Dreams My LA Ex", and also two songs for Phil Roy, one of which was on the soundtrack for the film As Good as It Gets starring Jack Nicholson and Helen Hunt.

According to news reports, Dennis was working on a new album under the name Sexcassettes, which she planned to release in 2008. She has collaborated with Mark Ronson on his album, The Business. As of 2015, Dennis became a vocal affiliate with Galantis by first performing, uncredited, on their debut album Pharmacy on the tracks "Runaway (U & I)" and "Louder, Harder, Better". She later co-wrote their song "Love on Me" from their second album The Aviary and sang on five songs from their 2019 album Church. In 2019, Dennis returned to performing. She celebrated her 30th anniversary in the music business with a performance at London's Mighty Hoopla Festival. In 2020 and 2021, Dennis wrote for Now United and collaborated with composer Will Gregory on the soundtrack for the BBC/Discovery Channel docuseries, Serengeti.

== Songwriting career ==
Dennis has written a number of award-winning songs and international hit singles. Her first success was with "Bumper to Bumper", the B-side to the Spice Girls' hit "Wannabe".

Dennis continued this success by co-writing the Pop Idol theme (re-used for numerous international remakes of the show, including American Idol), and writing for Idol contestants, including Kelly Clarkson, Will Young, Gareth Gates, and Clay Aiken. Clarkson's single "Before Your Love" (a double A-side with "A Moment Like This") was Dennis's first US No. 1.

Dennis's "Can't Get You Out of My Head" (recorded by Kylie Minogue) spent four weeks at number one in Britain, while also rekindling interest in Minogue in America, where it hit No. 7 on the Billboard Hot 100. With over three million copies sold worldwide, "Can't Get You Out of My Head" became the second highest selling single of 2001.

Dennis also co-wrote the international hit "Toxic" by Britney Spears, which went to number one in the UK and worldwide.

Dennis's biggest success came in 2008 with Katy Perry's smash hit "I Kissed a Girl" co-written alongside Perry, Max Martin and Dr Luke, which ranks among the best-selling digital singles in history.

Dennis co-wrote three tracks on the Galantis album Pharmacy, one of which, "Runaway (U & I)", reached No. 1 on the UK Dance Chart and No. 9 on the US Dance chart, and was nominated for a Grammy Award. Dennis has written with KT Tunstall, Black Honey, and Sigala. More recently, Dennis co-wrote three tracks on the new Galantis album out in 2024 and the Laura White single "Nobody".

== Awards and nominations ==
=== World Music Awards Music Awards ===
Year	Nominee / work	Award	Result
1991	Herself	No. 1 New Pop Female Artist	Won

=== Billboard Music Awards ===
Year	Nominee / work	Award	Result
1991	Herself	No. 1 New Pop Female Artist	Won

=== Brit Awards ===
Year	Nominee / work	Award	Result	Ref.
1992	Herself	British Female Solo Artist	Nominated	

=== Grammy Awards ===
Year	Nominee / work	Award	Result
2004	"Come into My World"	Best Dance Recording	Won
2005	"Toxic"	Best Dance Recording	Won

=== Ivor Novello Awards ===
Year	Nominee / work	Award	Result
2001	"Never Had a Dream Come True"	Best Song Musically & Lyrically	Nominated
2002	"Can't Get You Out of My Head"	International Hit of the Year	Won
2002	"Can't Get You Out of My Head"	Most Performed Work	Won
2002	"Can't Get You Out of My Head"	The Ivors Dance Award	Won
2002	"Can't Get You Out of My Head"	Best Selling UK Single	Nominated
2003	"Anything is Possible"	Best Selling UK Single	Won
2005	"Toxic"	Most Performed Work	Won
2018	Herself	Outstanding Song Collection	Won

== Discography ==
- Move to This (1990)
- Into the Skyline (1992)
- Am I the Kinda Girl? (1996)

== See also ==
- List of number-one dance hits (United States)
- List of artists who reached number one on the US dance chart
