= Joe Grushecky =

American musician

- Born: Pittsburgh, Pennsylvania, U.S.
- Genres: Rock; Heartland rock
- Instruments: Guitar, Harmonica
- Years active: 1976–present
- Labels: Razor & Tie, Vanguard Records, Omnivore Recordings
- Website: www.joegrushecky.com

Joe Grushecky is an American rock musician known for his work with the Iron City Houserockers in the late 1970s and early 1980s; with Joe Grushecky and The Houserockers since the late 1980s; and as a solo artist. After his days with the Iron City Houserockers, he continued to have moderate success, mainly in the Pittsburgh area.

== Biography ==
In 1976, Joe Grushecky, a high school special education teacher, started the Brick Alley Band. They signed to Cleveland International Records in 1977, who rechristened them the Iron City Houserockers. The band's first album was Love's So Tough, released in 1979, and was a fair success. Their next album, Have a Good Time but Get out Alive! (released in 1980), was a bigger success. Two more albums followed, Blood on the Bricks in 1981 and Cracking Under Pressure (1983 as The Houserockers). By 1984, the band wasn't selling many records anymore and they were dropped by MCA Records. They broke up shortly thereafter.

After the breakup of the Iron City Houserockers, Grushecky returned home to Pittsburgh where he retook his teaching job (which he still holds). He also began to sharpen his songwriting. He released a single entitled "Good Bye Steeltown". Finally, in 1989, he fully re-emerged with his new act, Joe Grushecky and The Houserockers.

Grushecky's first new album since the Iron City Houserockers days was Rock & Real, released in 1989. It would be followed by seven more albums, including 1995's American Babylon, which was produced by Bruce Springsteen. Grushecky's more recent albums include Fingerprints (2002), A Good Life (2006), and East Carson Street (2009).

In 2024, Grushecky signed with Omnivore Recordings, who released the compilation Houserocker: A Joe Grushecky Anthology featuring remastered tracks spanning Grushecky's entire career, including songs from the Iron City Houserockers as well as his solo work. In July of 2024, Omnivore released Can't Outrun a Memory, the band's first album of new material since 2017's More Yesterdays Than Tomorrows.

== Discography ==
=== Albums ===
==== Iron City Houserockers ====
- 1979: Love's So Tough
- 1980: Have a Good Time But Get Out Alive!
- 1981: Blood on the Bricks
- 1983: Cracking Under Pressure (The Houserockers)

==== Joe Grushecky & The Houserockers ====
- 1989: Rock and Real
- 1991: Swimming With the Sharks
- 1992: End of the Century
- 1995: American Babylon
- 1997: Coming Home
- 1999: Down the Road Apiece Live
- 2004: True Companion
- 2009: East Carson Street
- 2012: We're Not Dead Yet: Live at the New Hazlett Theater
- 2016: American Babylon: Live at the Stone Pony
- 2017: More Yesterdays Than Tomorrows
- 2024: Can't Outrun A Memory

==== Joe Grushecky ====
- 2002: Fingerprints
- 2006: A Good Life
- 2013: Somewhere East of Eden
- 2015: It's in My Song

=== Compilations ===
- 1992: Pumping Iron & Sweating Steel: The Best of the Iron City Houserockers
- 2006: Outtakes and Demos 1975-2003
- 2024: Houserocker: A Joe Grushecky Anthology

=== Singles ===
==== Iron City Houserockers ====
- 1979: "Hideaway"
- 1980: "Hypnotized"
- 1980: "Junior's Bar"
- 1980: "We're Not Dead Yet"
- 1981: "Friday Night"

==== Joey G. ====
- 1984: "Radio Ears"/"Goodbye Steeltown"
- 1985: "Stand Up"/"Victory!"

==== Joe Grushecky & The Houserockers ====
- 1989: "How Long"
- 1995: "Chain Smokin'"
- 1995: "Labor of Love"
- 1996: "Labor of Love (Live)"
- 1997: "Coming Home"
- 2017: "That's What Makes Us Great" (With Bruce Springsteen)
- 2018: "More Yesterdays Than Tomorrows"
- 2024: "Here in '68"
- 2024: "Until I See You Again"
- 2025: "Living in a Blues Song"
