= Timothy White (photographer) =

American photographer

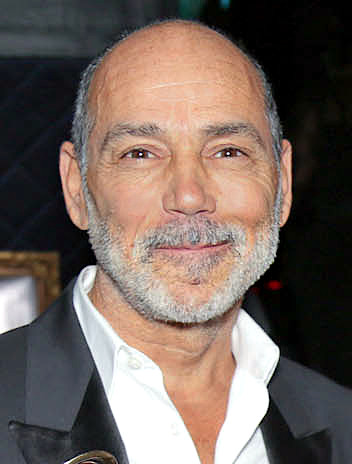
- Timothy White in 2017
- Education: Rhode Island School of Design
- Occupations: Photographer, author
- Awards: Awards section
- Website: timothywhite.com

Timothy White is an American celebrity photographer. He has photographed film actors and music artists, and shot for movie posters, magazine and music album covers. He has directed advertising campaigns and television commercials. He has published books of his photography works.

He has volunteered his photography work for nonprofit and environmental organizations. White has been named "one of the most influential people in photography" by American Photo magazine, and was inducted into the New Jersey Hall of Fame in 2019.

== Early life and career ==
White was brought up in Fort Lee, New Jersey, as the youngest of three children. His father was a financial controller for the Coast Guard, and his mother was a housewife.

White received a diploma from Rhode Island School of Design in 1979. He moved to New York City, where he began a career in photography by assisting a fashion and music photographer. He initially focused on shooting portraits for young musicians, aspiring models and actors, and made forty trips to South America over the course of four years on travel assignments. Basing his experience of his South American work, he won an assignment at Rolling Stone to do a shoot for Yoko Ono.

== Photography ==
White has contributed to the covers of magazines such as Vanity Fair, Rolling Stone, Esquire, People, and Us as well as movie posters for Hollywood's studios. His movie posters include Wild, Wild West, Snake Eyes, A Perfect Murder, Mission to Mars, High Fidelity, and several movies of Harrison Ford including Random Hearts, Paranoia, Ender's Game, and Six Days, Seven Nights.

His work has also been seen on album covers for musicians such as Bruce Springsteen, Aretha Franklin, and Jon Bon Jovi. He has photographed actors Harrison Ford, Sophia Loren, Audrey Hepburn, Paul McCartney, Nicolas Cage, Whoopi Goldberg, Yoko Ono, Elizabeth Taylor, Brad Pitt, Will Smith, Julia Roberts, Gwyneth Paltrow, Julianne Moore, Ben Affleck and Tim Robbins, and music artists Eric Clapton, Celine Dion, Whitney Houston, Outkast, and Keith Richards.

White directed the music video "Love Gets Me Every Time" (1997) as he photographed Shania Twain for the Come On Over album art. He has also directed television commercials and major ad campaigns such as Got Milk? Queen Latifah's Queen perfume, and Joyful Heart's No More PSA campaign for males who have experienced childhood sexual abuse.

White, with his friend Walt Wilson purchased the entire town of Amboy, California in the year 2000, and used it for photoshoots and to host movie companies. White saw value in maintaining the property in a weathered, worn condition as a filming location. They sold gasoline, food, and Route 66 souvenirs at Roy's Motel and Café. However they relinquished control and returned ownership of the property when it went into foreclosure for repossession in 2005.

White relocated his studio from Manhattan, New York to Los Angeles in 2013. He oversaw the opening of the Morrison Hotel Gallery's West Hollywood outpost located within the Sunset Marquis Hotel, and later became a part owner. The gallery represents 90 photographers and features fine art photography of rock legends.

White photographed bulldog and internet celebrity Izzy the Frenchie in 2019 at the pet's canine wedding, which Entertainment Tonight called as "the wedding of 2019".

White is an avid car collector and also photographs automobiles.

== Charity and pro bono work ==
White has done pro bono work for nonprofit and environmental organizations. For Recycle Across America, that provides recycle bins, he conducted a billboard shoot for their PSA national campaign.

As part of volunteering for Riverkeeper, non-profit environmental organization for the protection of the Hudson River and its tributaries, he photographed pollution sites from a helicopter piloted by Harrison Ford.

At the 2015 amfAR gala at Cannes, White's photograph of the AIDS research foundation, amFAR's founder Elizabeth Taylor giving the finger to paparazzi was bid by Lady Gaga and Aileen Getty each for $200,000, and was auctioned for $80,000.

All proceeds from the sale of his book Hollywood Pinups went to Oxfam America. For the book, he was commissioned by Esquire magazine to create a tribute to Alberto Vargas' creation of Vargas Girls, the paintings of pin-up girls for the magazine in the 1940s. White photographed 23 women including Ashley and Mary-Kate Olsen, Susan Sarandon, Kate Hudson, and Cindy Crawford.

== Discography ==
Timothy White has photographed for music albums from the 1980s. He has sometimes been credited as Tim White.

Year	Album	Artist	Production credit
1986	The Secret Value of Daydreaming	Julian Lennon	Cover photography
1986	Waking Up	Topper Headon	Cover photograph
1987	Ready or Not	Lou Gramm	Cover photography
1988	Talk to Your Daughter	Robben Ford	Photography with Mike Russ
1989	Storm Front	Billy Joel	Back photo
1989	Mr. Jordan	Julian Lennon	Photography
1989	One Night of Sin	Joe Cocker	Photography
1990	Wilson Phillips	Wilson Phillips	Cover photography
1991	Unusual Heat	Foreigner	Photography
1991	Time, Love & Tenderness	Michael Bolton	Photography
1991	Straight Outta Hell's Kitchen	Lisa Lisa and Cult Jam	Photography
1992	Change Your World	Michael W. Smith	Photography
1993	The One Thing	Michael Bolton	Photography
1994	Miracles: The Holiday Album	Kenny G	Photography
1994	Here It Is	Freddie Jackson	Photography
1995	I'll Lead You Home	Michael W. Smith	Cover photography
1996	This Is the Time: The Christmas Album	Michael Bolton	Photography
1997	"Love Gets Me Every Time" (single)	Shania Twain	Director
1999	Timeless: The Classics Vol. 2	Michael Bolton	Photography
2006	James Taylor at Christmas	James Taylor	Photography
2015	Before This World	James Taylor	Photography

== Awards and accolades ==
The Newark Museum opened its gallery in the summer of 2003 with a retrospective installation of White's work. The same year, food rescue organization City Harvest honored him with the Heart of the City Award, as the director of their ad on feeding the hungry.

White has been named "one of the most influential people in photography" by American Photo magazine. He is the recipient of the Lucie Foundation's 2004 International Photographer of the Year award. He was awarded the Spotlight Award at the San Luis Obispo International Film Festival in 2012, at an event which paid him a tribute.

He was inducted into the New Jersey Hall of Fame for 2018.

He was awarded the Outstanding Achievement in Photography at the third annual Hollywood Beauty Awards in 2017. In turn, the Timothy White Award for Photography which is a category, as the nominee categories get named after the current honorees, was won by Jennifer Graylock.

== Bibliography ==
- Timothy White: Portraits, Rizzoli, 2001 ISBN 0-8478-2398-9
- Indian Larry, Merrell, 2006 ISBN 1-85894-334-5
- Hollywood Pinups, HarperCollins, 2008 ISBN 0-06-134959-3
- Match Prints, Harper Collins, 2010 ISBN 0-06-168912-2
