= Love's So Tough =

Studio album by Iron City Houserockers
- Released: April 14, 1979
- Recorded: 1978
- Studio: Agency Recording, Cleveland, Ohio; Asterick Recording, Pittsburgh, Pennsylvania
- Genre: Rock, Hard rock, Heartland Rock
- Length: 37:30
- Label: MCA
- Producer: The Slimmer Twins (Steve Popovich and Marty Mooney)

Iron City Houserockers chronology
Love's So Tough (1979)	Have a Good Time but Get Out Alive! (1980)

Singles from Love's So Tough
- 1. "Hideaway / Blondie" Released: July 1979

Professional ratings
Review scores
Source	Rating
AllMusic	3.5/5 stars
Christgau's Record Guide	B
Rolling Stone	Favorable

Love's So Tough is a studio album by the Iron City Houserockers. Released in 1979, the Iron City Houserocker's first album attempts to capture the presence of what was essentially a Pittsburgh bar band playing to a blue collar crowd every night. While Joe Grushecky's songwriting skills are clearly still developing, his potential is visible in cuts such as "Dance With Me" and "Heroes Are Hard to Find". The general sound of the album is reminiscent of a slightly "harder" Bruce Springsteen, and the heavy use of harmonica would be a distinguishing factor of the Houserockers for several albums to come.

== Background ==
In the spring of 1977 Joe Grushecky's brother Jon sent him a full page advertisement from Billboard, about the release of a Ronnie Spector record on Cleveland International Records. The band was known at that time as the Brick Alley Band, and they sent a demo tape to Steve Popovich at Cleveland International Records. After a personal phone call from Steve Popovich, Joe Grushecky and his band drove out to Cleveland and under the guidance of Steve Popovich and Marty Mooney, made a series of recordings that landed a deal with MCA Records.

The song "Blondie" was originally recorded during the Love's So Tough sessions and issued as the B-side to the "Hideaway" single. The song would go on to be completely re-written with the help of Steve Van Zandt and re-recorded during the Have a Good Time... But Get Out Alive sessions and issued on that album in 1980.

The Chuck Berry song "School Days (Ring! Ring! Goes the Bell)" was also recorded for the album but was cut from the final release. The track was then released on Pumping Iron & Sweating Steel: The Best of the Iron City Houserockers.

A promotional-only picture disc LP containing an exclusive pre-release mix of the album as well as the track "Blondie" was released early to attendees of the 1979 NARM National Convention in North Canton, Ohio.

The album was reissued in CD format in 1999 by Rock Heritage, and again in 2019 in remastered digital format by Cleveland International Records for its 40th anniversary.

== Track listing ==
=== Side one ===
1. "I Can't Take It" (Joe Grushecky) – 3:54
2. "Hideaway" (Fred Goodman) – 4:31
3. "Turn It Up" (Grushecky) – 4:54
4. "Dance with Me" (Grushecky, Art Nardini) – 4:46

=== Side two ===
1. "Love So Tough" (Grushecky, Gil Snyder) – 3:42
2. "Veronica" (Grushecky) – 3:38
3. "Heroes Are Hard to Find" (Grushecky, Nardini, Gary Scalese) – 2:55
4. "Stay with Me Tonight" (Grushecky) – 4:43
5. "I'm Lucky" (Grushecky, Nardini) – 4:27

== Personnel ==
Iron City Houserockers

- Joe Grushecky – lead vocals, guitar
- Gary Scalese – guitar
- Art Nardini – bass guitar
- Gil Snyder – keyboards
- Ned E. Rankin – drums
- Marc Reisman – harmonica

with:

- Billy Cross – slide guitar on "Turn It Up", guitar on "Hideaway" and "Stay with Me Tonight"
- Denny Martin – accordion on "Stay with Me Tonight"
- Richard Reising – background vocals on "Dance with Me" and "Hideaway"
- Susan Lynch – background vocals on "Dance with Me" and "Hideaway"
- Rodney Psyka – background vocals on "Dance with Me" and "Hideaway"
- Tampa Lann – background vocals on "I'm Lucky"

"Turn It Up" was recorded at Asterick Recording, Pittsburgh, Pennsylvania.

== Chart performance ==
Chart (1979)	Peak position
Billboard Bubbling Under the Top LP's	201
Cash Box Top Albums	164
