= Ellen Foley =

American singer and actress

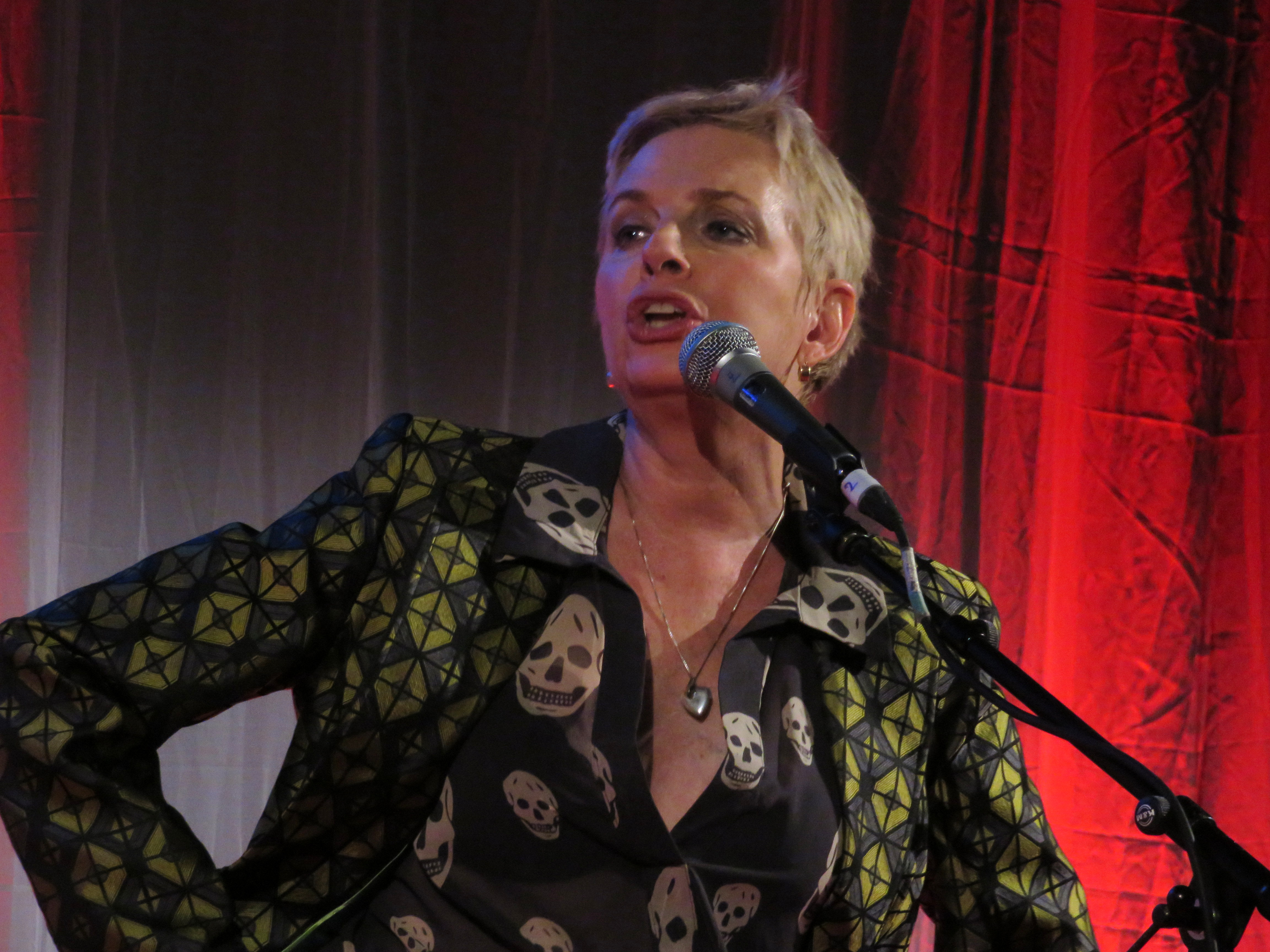
- Foley in 2014

Background information
- Born: June 5, 1951 (age 75)
- Origin: St. Louis, Missouri, U.S.
- Genre: Rock
- Occupations: Singer; actress
- Instrument: Vocals
- Years active: 1977–present
- Label: Epic

Ellen Foley (born June 5, 1951) is an American singer and actress who has appeared on Broadway and television, where she co-starred in the hit NBC sitcom Night Court during its second season. In music, she has released five solo albums, but she is best known for her collaborations with rock singer Meat Loaf, particularly the 14× Platinum selling 1977 album Bat Out of Hell.

== Early life and education ==
Foley was born in St. Louis, Missouri, the daughter of John and Virginia B. Foley. She attended Webster University.

== Career ==
=== Vocalist ===
Foley gained public recognition through singing a duet with Meat Loaf on the hit single "Paradise by the Dashboard Light" from the 1977 album Bat Out of Hell. Foley's part was recorded individually and in one take with Meat Loaf present in the room so she could sing in character. Although Karla DeVito (who toured with Meat Loaf in support of the album) is featured in the music video, DeVito is lip synching to Foley's vocals.

Foley's debut album Night Out was released in 1979; the album's single "What's a Matter Baby" reached No. 7 in the Dutch charts and No. 92 on the US charts. The single "We Belong to the Night" reached No.1 in the Netherlands. The album, which peaked at No. 152, was produced by Ian Hunter and Mick Ronson. Foley recorded a duet with Ian Hunter in 1980, "We Gotta Get Outta Here". Her creative relationship with Hunter led her to singing backing vocals on the Iron City Houserockers' 1980 album Have a Good Time but Get Out Alive!, produced by Hunter, Ronson, and The E Street Band's Steven Van Zandt.

Foley also sings in the title cut of the 1979 Blue Öyster Cult album Mirrors, and on The Clash album Sandinista! (released in 1980) in the songs "Hitsville UK" and "Corner Soul" (as well as the unreleased track "Blonde Rock 'n' Roll"). In 1981, all four members of The Clash appeared on her album The Spirit of St. Louis, and Mick Jones and Joe Strummer co-wrote a number of songs for the album. Jones produced the album, which featured members of The Blockheads and peaked at No. 137 on the US charts. In 1982, she provided backing vocals on The Clash's song "Car Jamming" from the album Combat Rock. The Clash's hit song "Should I Stay or Should I Go", written and sung by Jones, was about the turbulent relationship he shared with Foley at the time.

She released her third solo album Another Breath in 1983; it failed to chart. In 1984, she sang backing vocals on Joe Jackson's album Body & Soul and had a large role in the music video for Utopia's "Crybaby".

Foley was one of four female vocalists to front the group Pandora's Box, formed by Jim Steinman in the late 1980s. Their album Original Sin, released in 1989, was the first to feature the song "It's All Coming Back to Me Now" (vocals by Elaine Caswell); both Celine Dion and a duet between Meat Loaf and Marion Raven had separate chart successes with that song in some countries, years later.

=== Broadway, film and television ===
Foley studied acting at HB Studio in New York City. She has appeared on Broadway in such shows as Me and My Girl and the revival of Hair, and off-Broadway in Beehive. Foley originated the role of The Witch in Stephen Sondheim's Into the Woods at the Old Globe Theater in San Diego but was replaced by Bernadette Peters before the musical opened on Broadway. Foley eventually played the role on Broadway from August 1, 1989 until the show's closing on September 3, 1989.

Her best known television acting role is that of Billie Young on Night Court for season two (1984–85). She was succeeded by Markie Post as Christine Sullivan, who had been Reinhold Weege's first choice for the public defender part. Post had been unavailable while under contract on the television series The Fall Guy on ABC. In mid-1985, it was publicly announced that Foley left Night Court "to pursue other acting and singing roles." However, Foley later said, “I was fired, man! Got bumped for Markie Post! Beats me, I don’t know why.” She also remarked, "You don’t know pain until you’ve been replaced in a role by Markie Post." She had roles in Miloš Forman's film adaptation of the stage musical Hair (1979), as well as in the movies Fatal Attraction (1987), Married to the Mob (1988) and Cocktail (1988). Foley was in the short-lived 1977 series 3 Girls 3, co-starring with Debbie Allen and Mimi Kennedy.

=== Other pursuits ===
In the mid-2000s, she taught voice at the School of Rock (founded by Paul Green) in Manhattan.

== Personal life ==
In 1990, Foley married writer Doug Bernstein, co-author of the Off-Broadway revue Showing Off. They have two children, Henry and Timothy.

== Performances ==
Stage appearances
Year	Title	Role	Theatre
1977	Hair	Sheila	Biltmore Theatre, New
1983	Eve Is Innocent	Kim Dolphin	Actors and Directors Theatre, New York City
1986	Into the Woods	The Witch	Old Globe Theatre, San Diego, California
1987	Beautiful Bodies	Lisbeth	Whole Theatre Company, Montclair, New Jersey
1988	Me and My Girl	Sally	Marquis Theatre, New York City
1989	Into the Woods	The Witch	Martin Beck Theater, New York City
Film
Year	Film	Role	Notes
1979	Hair	Black Boys Singer	Directed by Miloš Forman
1982	Tootsie	Jacqui	Directed by Sydney Pollack
1982	The King of Comedy	Street Scum	Directed by Martin Scorsese
1987	Fatal Attraction	Hildy	Directed by Adrian Lyne
1988	Cocktail	Eleanor	Directed by Roger Donaldson
1988	Married to the Mob	Theresa	Directed by Jonathan Demme
2015	Lies I Told My Little Sister	Laura Lucien	Directed by William J. Stribling
2016	No Pay, Nudity	Tani Marshall	Directed by Lee Wilkof
Television
Year	Title	Role	Notes
1977	3 Girls 3	Self	Regular
1980	The Kenny Everett Video Show	Self	Performing "Stupid Girl"
1984–1985	Night Court	Billie Young	Regular on Season 2
1987	Spenser: For Hire	Ruth	Episode: "Consilum Abditum"
1992–1993	Ghostwriter	Principal Kelly	4 episodes
2000	Law & Order	Annette Tobin	Episode: "Black, White and Blue"
2011	Body of Proof	Evelyn Bryan	Episode: "Second Chances"

== Discography ==
=== Studio albums ===
- Night Out (1979) Epic - [NL #1; UK #68; AU #13; CAN #71]
- Spirit of St. Louis (1981) Epic - [NL #35; UK #57; AU #61]
- Another Breath (1983) Epic
- About Time (2013)
- Fighting Words (2021)

Note: all of these were issued by Epic within the U.S. on vinyl LP. They have been reissued on compact disc by Wounded Bird Records.

=== Compilations ===
- The Very Best of (1992)

=== Singles ===
- "We Belong to the Night"/"Young Lust" (1979) - [AU #15; NL #1; South Africa #7]
- "What's a Matter Baby"/"Hideaway" (1979) [NL #7; US #92]
- "Sad Song"/"Stupid Girl" (1980)
- "Stupid Girl"/"Young Lust" (1980)
- "The Shuttered Palace"/"Beautiful Waste of Time" (1981) - [AU #48]
- "Torchlight"/"Game of a Man" (1981)
- "Torchlight"/"Le palais" (1981)
- "Boys in the Attic"/"Beat of a Broken Heart" (1983)
- "Nightline (Single Version)"/"Beat of a Broken Heart (1983)
- "Nightline (Dance Mix - Long Version)"/"Nightline (Dance Mix - Short Version)" "Nightline (Dub)" [12" Maxi-Single]
- "Heaven Can Wait" (2015)

=== With Pandora's Box ===
- Original Sin (1989)

=== Guest appearances ===
- "Paradise by the Dashboard Light" (1977) (from Bat Out of Hell by Meat Loaf)
- "Mirrors" (1979) (from Mirrors by Blue Öyster Cult)
- "Hitsville U.K.", "Corner Soul", "Washington Bullets" and "Blonde Rock 'n' Roll" (1980) (from Sandinista! by The Clash)
- "We Gotta Get Out of Here" (1980) (from Welcome to the Club by Ian Hunter)
- "Junior's Bar" (1980) (from Have a Good Time but Get Out Alive! by Iron City Houserockers)
- "Car Jamming" (1982) (from Combat Rock by The Clash)
- Body and Soul (1984) (by Joe Jackson)
- "Going All the Way (A Song in 6 Movements)" (2016) (from Braver Than We Are by Meat Loaf)
