= Spirit of St. Louis (album) =

Studio album by Ellen Foley
- Released: March 1981
- Studios: Wessex, London
- Genre: Rock
- Length: 44:03
- Labels: Cleveland International; Epic
- Producer: Mick Jones

Ellen Foley chronology
Night Out (1979)	Spirit of St. Louis (1981)	Another Breath (1983)

Singles from Spirit of St. Louis
- 1. "The Shuttered Palace" Released: February 13, 1981; 2. "Torchlight" Released: April 10, 1981

Professional ratings
Review scores
Source	Rating
AllMusic	4/5 stars
The Village Voice	C

Spirit of St. Louis is the second studio album by American singer and actress Ellen Foley, released in March 1981. Foley is backed by The Clash on all songs, half of which were written by Clash frontmen Joe Strummer and Mick Jones. Foley was dating Jones at the time, and later recalled, "We were together for about two and a half years and somewhere in the course of that, I was on the Epic label and I needed a second album. And I wanted to be there with Mick and he and the guys just offered to do the album with me.” The album's title is in reference to Foley's birthplace of St. Louis, Missouri by way of Charles Lindbergh's monoplane.

== Writing and recording ==
Spirit of St. Louis was recorded in July 1980, in between the February–August 1980 recording sessions of The Clash's Sandinista! with the same musicians and engineers (Foley herself provided guest vocals on Sandinista!) and has come to be regarded as a companion of that album. As well as The Clash, the album featured musical contributions by Blockheads Mickey Gallagher, John Turnbull, Norman Watt-Roy, and Davey Payne, and singer/multi-instrumentalist Tymon Dogg (sans Turnbull, all of whom played on Sandinista!).

Whereas Foley's debut album Night Out (1979) was recorded in New York, Spirit of St. Louis was recorded in London, affecting the album's sensibilities. Foley recalled,

I went from a very American album to a very European album. It was all influenced by the environment, the people I was with, and the relationship. Mick was sort of, you know, anti-American music – or anti-American music of a certain kind, anyway. I mean, y’know, to Mick, Jim Steinman was The Devil. And that’s where I was coming from, and I think Mick was very interested in presenting the person that he was with in a very different light... We were both very, at that moment, into Edith Piaf. I was going through old LPs the other day, and I found about 12 Edith Piaf albums that I acquired back during that time. I think I thought I was going to be the Anglo-American Edith Piaf! The idea was that it was going to be a kind of...modern cabaret album."

Of the writing of the album's songs, Foley stated, "The Sandinista! record was being recorded at the same time.. It was part of the same vibe as them writing that other material, although it didn’t sound like it. They knew I was kind of an actor and could handle the bizarre images and lose myself into the stories. ‘Death of the Psychoanalyst of Salvador Dali’ – that was the mind of Joe Strummer. He didn’t come from that hardscrabble world of the punk scene. Strummer came from a really educated and sophisticated place, so I think maybe this was his opportunity to do some of that, where he didn’t have to be the everyman in The Clash, so he got to write some of these weirdo songs." She also recalled,

I wasn’t going to tell [Joe Strummer] what to write. In a way, it was sort of a difficult period for me, because I was just there as the singer... The funny thing is, I recall Mick and I would have “discussions,” about keys. Because I would ask, “What key...” And Mick would just be like, “What, what? You can sing it, you don’t need to sing in a key” – he almost didn’t understand, because, y’know, they just wrote. They didn’t even think about keys, they just wrote for Joe. But, as a singer, I have to sing in specific keys, obviously. So, I kind of think the whole vocal end of it was downplayed a little bit, actually, and that I could have shown a little bit more than I did vocally on that record. I think it was most interesting musically and lyrically, but in terms of the vocals... it wasn’t really an Ellen Foley record. I mean, it really was more of a Clash record. Whether you like it or not, I think that my first album, and the Meat Loaf material, really showed off how I sing. You know? But that kind of thing was just anathema to the whole situation with The Clash. The only thing I remember really arguing about was this thing, about specific keys...and it was like a concept that they just didn’t get! But I was very enthusiastic and accepting, because it was a really exciting project for me. And it was also them doing something different, that was tailored to something that they wanted to do for me. I mean, they wrote them, but those weren’t “Clash” songs by any stretch. And I think they thought it was sort of cool to do this kinda out there, Edith Piaf/ Rock’n’Roll record, which was something that they wouldn’t do for themselves.

Foley admitted that "Joe Strummer was a really extraordinary person in how empathic he was. I wasn’t surprised that he could write songs from the woman’s point of view at all. And I didn’t feel uncomfortable at all with the material. Joe was such a bohemian, y’know, and he was so open to anything..." She also recalled that The Clash "were a lot more relaxed because it wasn’t a Clash record. I think maybe they were maybe having more fun with it. They brought in people. And maybe especially Topper and Paul, because the pressure of The Clash record was off, and they maybe felt almost like session men sort of, which was probably a new experience for them at the time, and everybody felt that way, I think it was a more relaxed atmosphere, definitely."

== Release ==
The Clash's extensive involvement with the recording of Foley's album was not heavily publicised, with the band seeking to keep a low profile. (Jones, who produced Spirit of St. Louis, was credited in the album's liner notes as "Produced by my Boyfriend,” and for their musician credits, Strummer, Jones, Paul Simonon and Topper Headon were credited sans their surnames.) Foley said, “I was going along with the whole Clash ‘Screw the Man’ ethos. My manager came all the way over from America and we wouldn’t even let him in the studio to hear this stuff! So, I think we did everything to make the record not sell.”

Spirit of St. Louis was released in March 1981, bookended by two singles drawn from the album - "The Shuttered Palace" (released in February 1981) and "Torchlight" (released in April 1981). The album charted at No. 57 UK and peaked at No. 137 US. Foley conceded that "the record tanked! Let’s just say it. Nobody heard it!" and said,

...when you’re inside something you really believe in it. But then you put it out, and the record company doesn’t like it, and the record company doesn’t promote it, and they don’t play it on the radio...and it’s a real shock, because this is who you are at the time. You put out what you want the world to see as who you are. And those guys, The Clash, were gone: you know, after that, The Clash were still The Clash – but this was my album, and I was left with it. And in a way...I kind of didn’t feel like it was “my” album.. I’m sure there were things that I was feeling kind of pissed off about. You know, I might have been left thinking: ‘Well, if I had made an album that was the extension from my first album, which sold...’ You know, in retrospect, when you’re involved in things, you don’t see the things that you see later. All the stuff that my manager and people were telling me: ‘Oh, Ellen, why didn’t you make a record like the first one and blah, blah, blah...’ And I was like, “Oh, no, no, no, fuck you...” I thought I was part of The Clash...and I could get away with this, because The Clash could put out whatever they felt like, and people would love it. You know, their later stuff was so vastly different from their earlier stuff, and there were probably some punk-purists who were like “Oh, what is this?” and didn’t like it – but it certainly didn’t stop them from selling records, because they became such a huge band. But I wasn’t in that position, so, in a way, there was regret involved, especially after Mick and I weren’t together anymore, because you put in so much, and that record was really an extension of that relationship. So, at the time, when it didn’t sell and people were saying to me, “Wow. This doesn’t sound like you...” You know, when you’ve only made one album, and then you turn around and you’re a whole different person, it can confuse people. If you make a bunch of albums and you’re established, and then you start trying something different, that can work better... I’m sure if I listened to it now, with all the years of separation and distance, I’m sure I might think: “Well, yeah, actually: that was pretty good. I didn’t sound as bad as I thought!” Because I kept thinking back then, feh, I sound weak, I sound weak on this album. But I’m not taking away from the songs, because they were really interesting songs...

Foley also stated, "The songs were interesting and they used a lot of cool dramatic stuff and sound effects... Of course, the Clash fans were like, ‘What is this?’ They weren't into it. It's certainly something to put on your resume: ‘I made a record with the Clash.’ I would say that it's a great record. The weakest link was me, because I didn't think I was really doing what I do best, which is the “over-the-top-kind-of-girl-who-came-from-Meat-Loaf’ singing. My favourite song on there is Torchlight.”

Foley provided backing vocals on The Clash's fifth album, Combat Rock (1982), before returning to New York to record her third album, Another Breath (1983), with entirely new personnel.

== Legacy ==
Regarding The Spirit of St. Louis, Foley admitted, "I think the songs are good, the production is very, very cool but I didn’t sing as me, and my singing is a little subdued. Had it been my fourth or fifth album down the road, people would have paid more attention to it, ya know." She has also said, "I wouldn’t mind [Spirit of St. Louis] being thought of as a lost Clash project. I think that’s pretty cool. If people take a listen to it and they can hear something of that, that’s fine with me."

Three decades after the release of Spirit of St. Louis, Foley added the album's song "Torchlight" to her live performances. Foley said, "I think ["Torchlight"] was my favorite moment. It wasn’t like Meat Loaf rock ‘n’ roll and it wasn’t The Clash. It had this wonderful marimba sound to it, and it was really up and joyful and positive. I wasn’t feeling that kind of feeling all the time at that point. It was beautiful, God I love that sound.”

== Track listing ==
No.	Title	Writer(s)	Length
1.	"The Shuttered Palace"	Joe Strummer, Mick Jones	5:06
2.	"Torchlight"	Joe Strummer, Mick Jones	3:00
3.	"Beautiful Waste of Time"	Tymon Dogg	3:00
4.	"The Death of the Psychoanalyst of Salvador Dali"	Joe Strummer, Mick Jones	2:42
5.	"M.P.H."	Joe Strummer, Mick Jones	3:30
6.	"My Legionnaire"	Carlene Mair (English lyrics), Marguerite Monnot, Raymond Asso	4:32
7.	"Theatre of Cruelty"	Joe Strummer, Mick Jones	4:04
8.	"How Glad I Am"	Jimmy Williams, Larry Harrison	3:35
9.	"Phases of Travel"	Ellen Foley	4:13
10.	"Game of a Man"	Tymon Dogg	3:55
11.	"Indestructible"	Tymon Dogg	3:47
12.	"In the Killing Hour"	Joe Strummer, Mick Jones	2:39

== Charts ==
Chart (1981)	Peak position
Australian (Kent Music Report)	61
New Zealand Albums (RMNZ)	35
UK Albums (Official Charts)	57

== Personnel ==
=== Performers ===
- Ellen Foley – vocals

The Clash

- Mick Jones – guitars, vocals
- Joe Strummer – guitars
- Paul Simonon – bass
- Topper Headon – drums

Additional musicians

- Mickey Gallagher – keyboards
- John Turnbull – guitars
- Norman Watt-Roy – bass
- Davey Payne – saxophone
- Tymon Dogg – violin

=== Production ===
- Mick Jones ("My Boyfriend") – producer
- Bill Price – recording, mixing
- Jeremy Green – assistant engineer, mix assistant
- Tim Young – mastering at CBS Studios (London, UK)
- Pennie Smith – photography
