= Pumping Iron & Sweating Steel =

Pumping Iron & Sweating Steel: The Best of the Iron City Houserockers

Compilation album by Iron City Houserockers
- Released: 1992
- Recorded: 1979–1984
- Genre: Rock
- Length: 1:10:38
- Label: Rhino Records
- Producer: Bill Inglot

Iron City Houserockers chronology
Cracking Under Pressure (1983)	Pumping Iron & Sweating Steel: The Best of the Iron City Houserockers (1992)

Professional ratings
Review scores
Source	Rating
AllMusic	4.5/5 stars
The Encyclopedia of Popular Music	4/5 stars
MusicHound Rock: The Essential Album Guide	4/5 stars

Pumping Iron & Sweating Steel: The Best of the Iron City Houserockers is a compilation album by the Iron City Houserockers. Released in 1992 under Rhino Records, it was at the time the only Iron City Houserockers material available on compact disc (Love's So Tough and Have a Good Time but Get out Alive! would not be reissued on CD for another seven years after this compilation appeared).

The disc covers all four Iron City Houserockers albums from the late seventies and early eighties and places them in chronological order, with a few extra tracks thrown in. Tracks 1–5 were taken from Love's So Tough, with "School Days," a Chuck Berry cover, being an unreleased outtake from that album. Tracks 6–11 were taken from Have a Good Time but Get out Alive!, but with the single version of "Junior's Bar" which is an entirely different take than the album version. Tracks 12–15 were taken from Blood on the Bricks, tracks 16–17 from Cracking Under Pressure and "Goodbye Steeltown," a Joe Grushecky single released in August 1984 (after the band had broken up), was included as the final song. The songs were remastered for compact disc by Bill Inglot.

== Critical reception ==
AllMusic called the collection "a generous compilation of the best of an underrated rock & roll band from the late '70s and early '80s."

== Track listing ==
1. "I Can't Take It" (Joe Grushecky) – 3:55
2. "Dance With Me" (Grushecky, Art Nardini) – 4:47
3. "Love So Tough" (Grushecky, Gil Snyder) – 3:43
4. "Heroes Are Hard to Find" (Grushecky, Nardini, Gary Scalese) – 2:57
5. "School Days (Ring! Ring! Goes the Bell)" (Chuck Berry) – 3:23
6. "Have a Good Time (But Get Out Alive)" (Grushecky) – 3:52
7. "Blondie" (Grushecky) – 2:46
8. "Pumping Iron" (Eddie Britt, Grushecky) – 3:56
9. "Old Man Bar" (Bob Boyer, Britt, Snyder) – 3:17
10. "Junior's Bar" (Single Version) (Britt, Snyder, Grushecky) – 3:55
11. "Rock Ola" (Grushecky) – 2:57
12. "Blood on the Bricks" (Grushecky) – 4:20
13. "Fool's Advice" (Grushecky) – 5:12
14. "Saints and Sinners" (Grushecky) – 4:26
15. "Be My Friend" (Grushecky) – 4:22
16. "There'll Never Be Enough Time" (Grushecky) – 4:52
17. "Angels" (Britt, Grushecky) – 3:40
18. "Goodbye Steeltown" (Grushecky) – 4:17
