= Jennifer Graylock =

American photographer

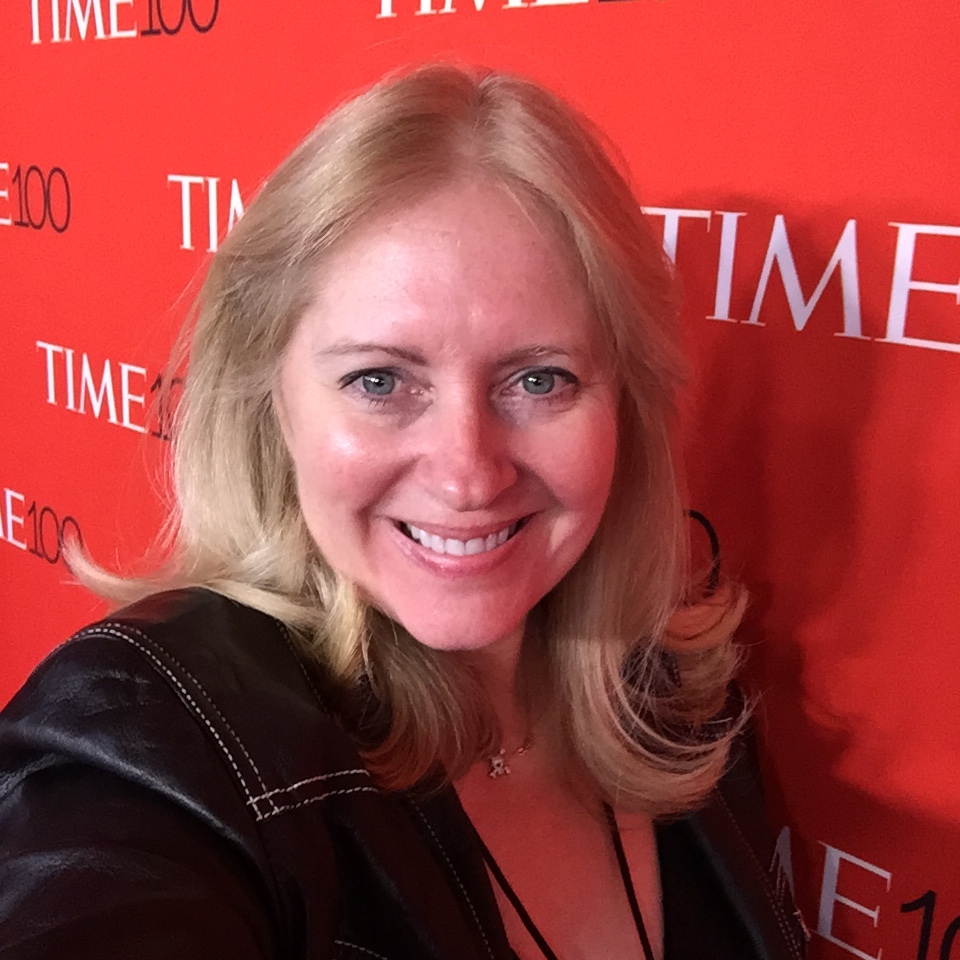
- Jennifer Graylock at the Time 100 Gala, 2015
- Education: Montana State University (B.S.); Fairleigh Dickinson University (M.B.A.)
- Occupations: Photographer, business owner
- Known for: Fashion, beauty, and entertainment photography
- Website: www.graylock.com

Jennifer Graylock is an American fashion and entertainment photographer. Her work has been published in Vogue, Glamour, Us Weekly, People, TV Guide, and InStyle. In 2017, she won the Timothy White Award for Photography at the Hollywood Beauty Awards.

== Education ==
She has a Master of Business Administration and a Bachelor of Science in photography from Fairleigh Dickinson University and Montana State University.

== Works in the media ==
- Jennifer Graylock award winner for the Hollywood Beauty Awards
- Jennifer Graylock interview by The Fashion Spot Jennifer Graylock
- Jennifer Graylock photographs Rihanna for the Us Weekly
- Jennifer Graylock photographs Karlie Kloss at the 2017 Met Gala for
- Jennifer Graylock photographs Scarlett Johansson for The Washington Post
