= Tuna (dog) =

Internet celebrity dog

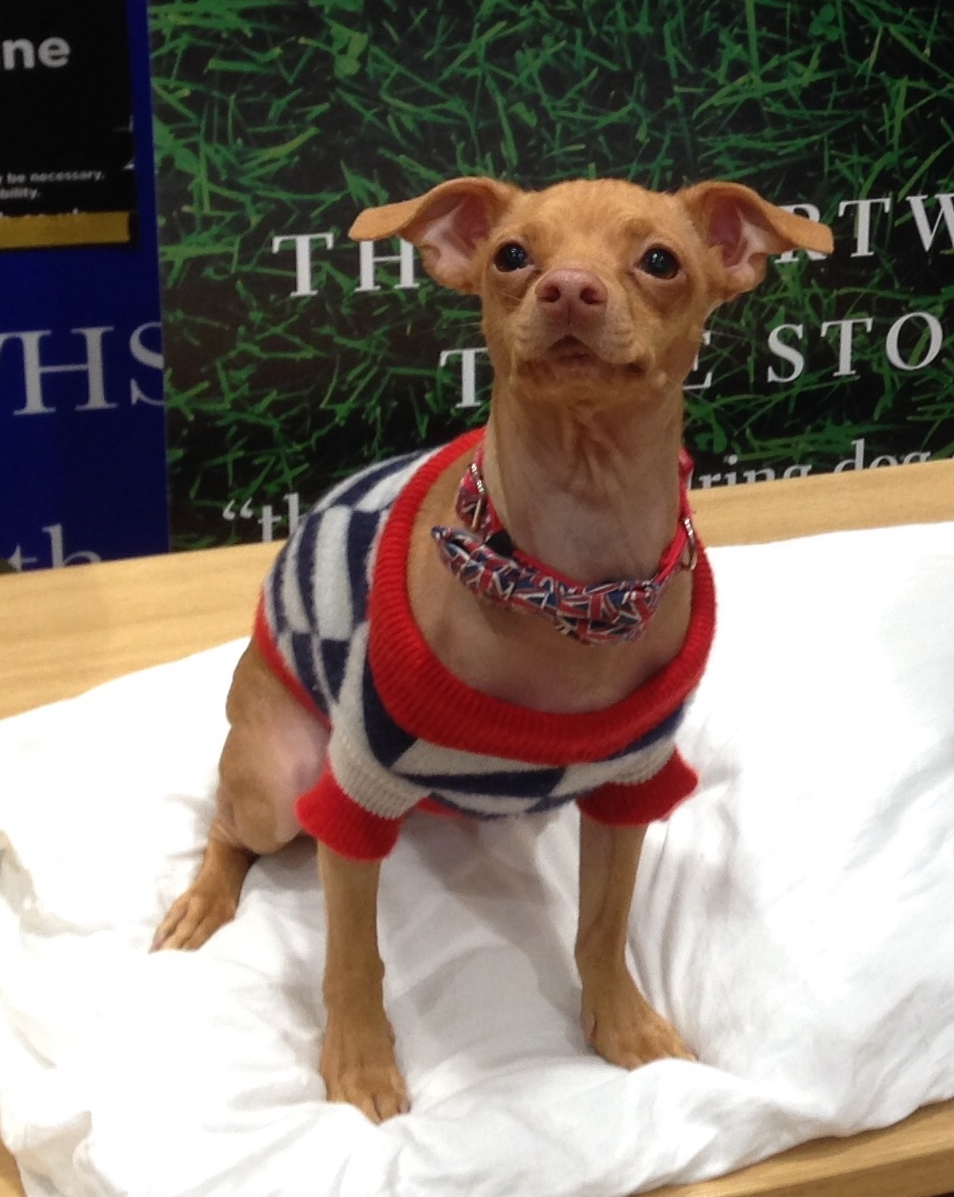
- Tuna, at a book signing in the UK in June 2015
- Other names: Wormy; Mr. Burns; Tooney; Phteven
- Species: Canis familiaris
- Breed: Chihuahua–Dachshund crossbreed
- Sex: Male
- Born: c. 2010
- Nationality: United States
- Notable role: Internet celebrity
- Years active: 2012–present
- www.tunameltsmyheart.com

Tuna is a Chihuahua–Dachshund crossbreed dog, best known as an internet celebrity, and an internet meme. He was abandoned by his original owner near San Diego, and was adopted at a farmer's market in Los Angeles by Courtney Dasher. After she created an Instagram page for him, a photo of him was featured on the company's website resulting in an increase in followers. Dasher has used Tuna's celebrity status to raise money for animal rescue groups and to promote animal welfare generally. A book of photographs of Tuna was released in 2015, entitled Tuna Melts My Heart: The Underdog With The Overbite.

== Early life ==
Tuna was found on a roadside near San Diego, California, having been abandoned by his original owner. He suffered emotional trauma from this abandonment, leading him to the habit of crawling on his belly; because of this, his rescuer called him "Wormy".

Tuna was taken to a farmer's market in Los Angeles by the rescue center at the age of around four months, where Courtney Dasher saw him and adopted him. She decided to change his name from "Wormy" to "Mr. Burns" because of his resemblance to the character in The Simpsons. She had initially only intended to foster the dog, but after a week decided that she would keep him. Over time, he was called "Tooney" affectionately which eventually became "Tuna".

== Internet career ==
His internet career began in 2012 when Dasher created an Instagram page for him. She had no aspirations of turning Tuna into a celebrity, but his followers drastically increased after the company featured an image of him on their front page. He also gained exposure as an internet meme by the name of "Phteven" (Steven with a ph at the start), which was originally created on Reddit as a response to a user's story about a person in McDonald's misunderstanding his explanation of "Stephen". By 2015, he had 1.3 million followers on Instagram. His followers are global; while a large number comes from the United States, he also has a strong following in the UK, Sweden and Australia. Dasher has used this popularity to support the work of animal rescue groups, both by raising the general awareness of rescue animals and by generating funding for specific groups.

Due to his success, he has become an Internet celebrity, and has been invited to a variety of events including a launch party for the pre fall 2015 Choo Hound capsule collection at the Ivy Chelsea Garden restaurant in London.

=== Book ===
Dasher was approached by a publisher in the United States in the autumn of 2014, who gave her creative freedom to produce a Tuna book in whatever manner she preferred. She decided to create a book to represent a day in the life of Tuna, using photos similar to those posted on Instagram, and entitled it Tuna Melts My Heart: The Underdog With The Overbite. After the launch in early 2015, a book tour was arranged to take place during March in the United States, with events held to benefit local animal rescue societies such as the Animal Rescue League of Boston, and PAWS Chicago.

The book was subsequently released in the UK on June 4, 2015. As part of the promotion for the UK launch, Dasher and Tuna took over the Marie Claire Instagram account for a day on June 3, and also appeared on the ITV programme This Morning.

== See also ==
- Boo
- Manny the Frenchie
- Izzy the Frenchie
- List of individual dogs
