= Izzy the Frenchie =

Bulldog

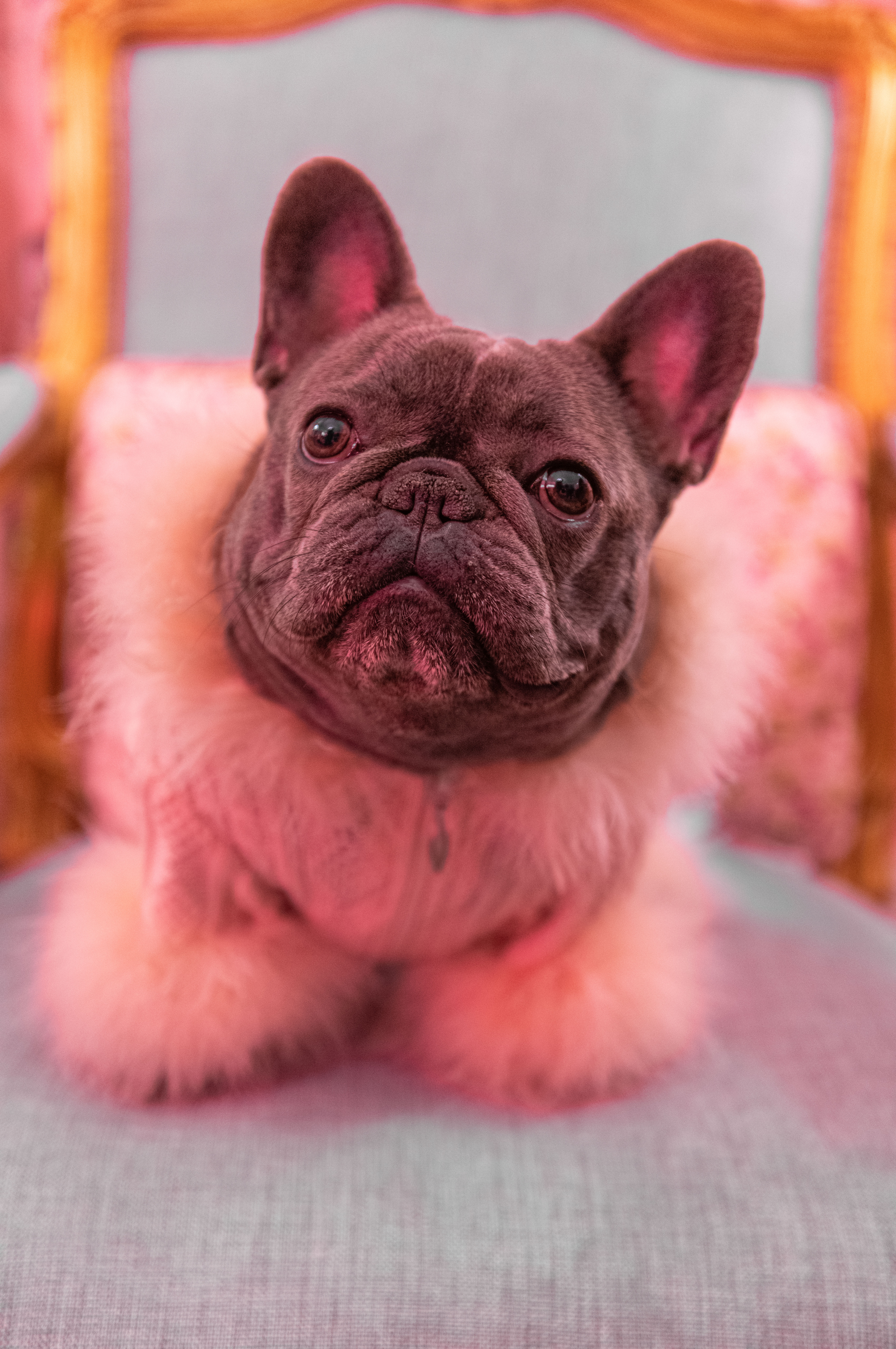
- Other name: Isabel
- Species: Dog
- Breed: French Bulldog
- Sex: Female
- Born: ca. 2017; California
- Nationality: United States
- Notable role: Internet celebrity
- Years active: 2017–present
- Owner: Shane Jordan
- www.izzythefrenchie.com

Izzy the Frenchie is a French bulldog, known as an internet celebrity. Izzy was born in northern California and moved with her owner Shane Jordan to the Hamptons in New York. The Mayor of Nashville, Tennessee, in 2020 issued an executive order and proclamation declaring August 26 "Izzy The Frenchie Day" in the city. As of 2021, Izzy had over one million followers on Instagram and currently lives in East Hampton, New York.

== Popularity ==
Izzy the Frenchie's notoriety began when she was a 5-week-old pup in a bath video. Izzy's owners created an Instagram page to share her adventures with their family and friends; the Instagram account has over 1 million followers. The bath video was shared on Instagram and became an immediate viral sensation around the world, with over 12 million views within 24 hours. Izzy's video was shared or watched by nearly a half a billion views from multiple shares on social media platforms. Izzy the French was listed in People's "21 Adorable Instagrams in 2017".

She has been featured in Vogue and asked to appear in her feature for the annual who's who of pop cultures Paper's "Break the Internet" in their November 2018 issue as one of the most viral icons of 2018. Izzy became an ambassador for the luxury hotel The Plaza Hotel in New York City in 2018. Izzy's dresses are made by a former Dior designer.

Izzy's engagement to Filmore was announced on January 10, 2019, by Izzy's soon-to-be grandmother-in-law, actress Whoopi Goldberg, in an Instagram post. Filmore's owner is Alex Martin, Goldberg's only child. The announcement prompted positive comments about the social significance of such a large over-the-top ceremony. Entertainment Tonight called it "the wedding of 2019," Brides Magazine said it set the stage for modern canine weddings and the new Lady and the Tramp. The news of the engagement was announced on the TV show and website of TMZ and Vanity Fair and was called "the wedding of our times." The wedding was in a top secret location, with a private guest list. Celebrity photographer Timothy White photographed the couple. New York reported that a reception was to be held at the estate of Whoopi Goldberg outside of New York City.

Izzy is owned by Shane Jordan. Izzy was signed to Simon & Schuster for the book "Wear the Damn Mask", released on November 17, 2020. During the 2021 Tokyo Olympic, a diver gold medallist, Tom Daley, was seen knitting a pink and purple material in a viral photo that kept his fans wondering about what he was doing. Days later, Daley revealed on his "knitting" Instagram page that he was stitching a jumper sweater gift for Izzy the Frenchie.

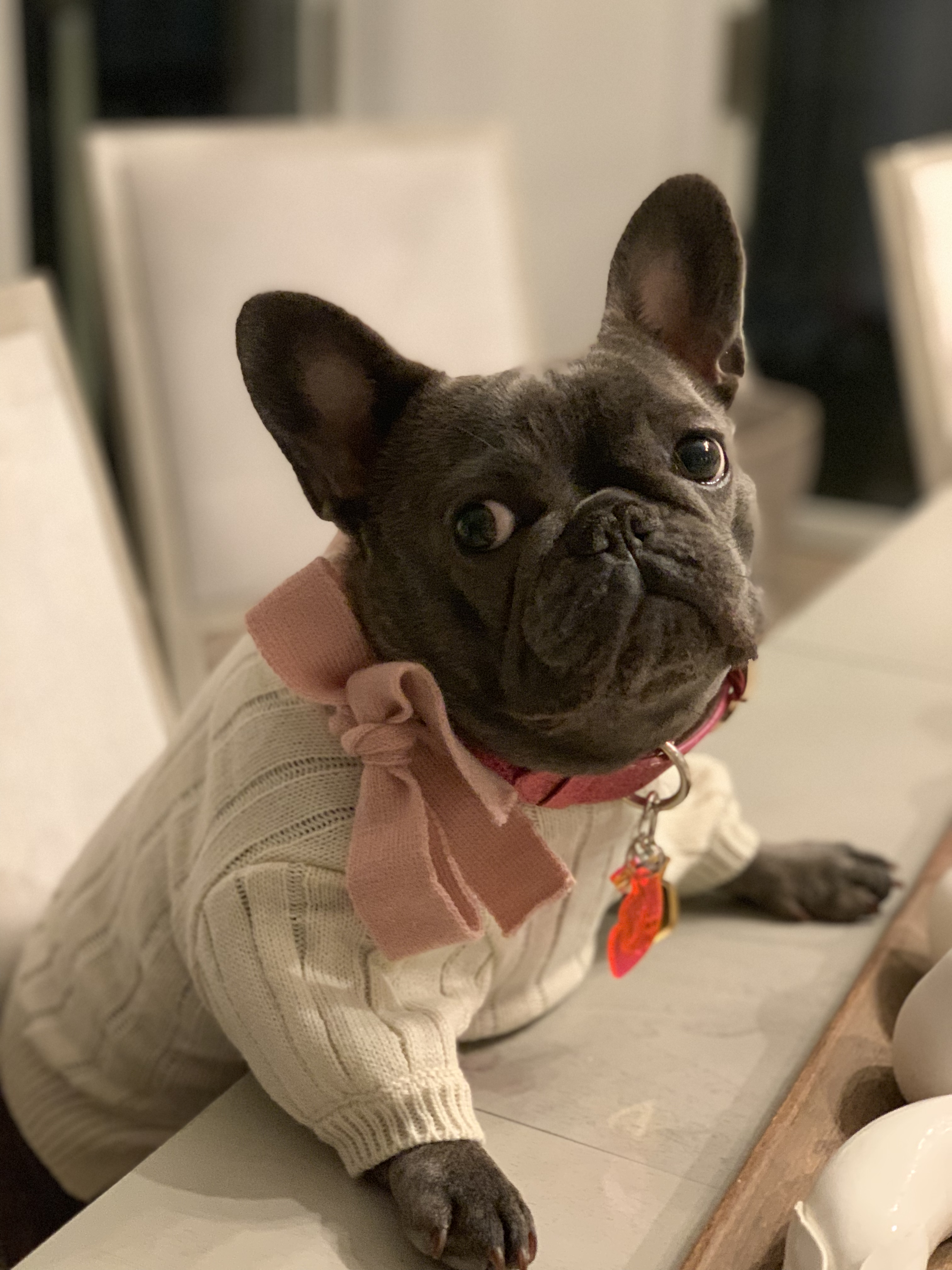
Izzy in New York City

== Award ==
In 2021, Izzy was named the Top Social Media Animal of the year by Webby People's Voice Awards. She was previously nominated in same Social Animal category for the 2020 edition alongside The Dodo, and was conferred the 2020 Webby Awards Honoree.

== See also ==
- Tuna
- List of individual dogs
