= Another Breath =

Studio album by Ellen Foley
- Released: 1983
- Recorded: 1983
- Studios: Mediasound Studios (New York City, New York)
- Genre: Rock
- Length: 40:39
- Label: Epic
- Producer: Vini Poncia

Ellen Foley chronology
Spirit of St. Louis (1981)	Another Breath (1983)	About Time (2013)

Another Breath is the third studio album by Ellen Foley.

== Track listing ==
No.	Title	Writer(s)	Length
1.	"Boys in The Attic"	Ellie Greenwich, Jeff Kent, Rob Parissi	4:37
2.	"Johnny and Mary"	Robert Palmer	4:07
3.	"Another Breath"	Bob Riley	4:06
4.	"Let Me Be The One You Love"	David Landau, Desmond Child	3:53
5.	"Read My Lips"	Desmond Child, Ellen Foley	3:30
6.	"Nightline"	Brie Howard, Davey Faragher, Glen Ballard	5:06
7.	"Come To Me"	Karen Brooks, Randy Sharp	3:47
8.	"Run For My Life"	Ellen Foley, Ellie Greenwich, Jeff Kent	4:23
9.	"Come and Get These Memories"	Brian Holland, Lamont Dozier, Eddie Holland	3:02
10.	"Spy in The House of Love"	Bob Riley, Ellen Foley	4:08

2007 Reissue Bonus Tracks
No.	Title	Writer(s)	Length
11.	"Nightline" (Single Version)	Brie Howard, Davey Faragher, Glen Ballard	3:50
12.	"Beat of a Broken Heart" (Single Version)	Ellen Foley, Fred Goodman	4:49
13.	"Ghost of Chance"	Ellen Foley, Fred Goodman	5:14
14.	"Nightline" (Dance Mix - Short Version)	Brie Howard, Davey Faragher, Glen Ballard	3:29
15.	"Nightline" (Dance Mix - Long Version)	Brie Howard, Davey Faragher, Glen Ballard	6:15

== Personnel ==
- Ellen Foley – lead vocals, additional backing vocals
- Tommy Mandel – keyboards, synthesizers
- Benjy King – synthesizers
- Phil Grande – guitars
- Tony Bridges – bass
- Bob Riley – drums
- Lenny Pickett – saxophone
- Lou Christie – backing vocals (1)
- Elaine Caswell – backing vocals
- Zephryn Conte – backing vocals
- Maria Vidal – backing vocals
- Susan Collins – additional backing vocals
- Ellie Greenwich – additional backing vocals
- Jeff Kent – additional backing vocals
- Vini Poncia – additional backing vocals
- Zora Rasmussen – additional backing vocals

=== Production ===
- Vini Poncia – producer
- Bob Schaper – associate producer, engineer
- Harry Spiridakis – assistant engineer
- Doug Sax – mastering at The Mastering Lab (Hollywood, California)
- Ellen Foley – album design
- David Gahr – cover photography
- Herbert Schulz – back cover photography
- Carolyn DeSimine – inner sleeve photography
