= Waking Up (Topper Headon album) =

Studio album by Topper Headon
- Released: 1986
- Recorded: July–August 1986
- Studios: Wessex, London
- Genres: Soul; jazz; R&B
- Length: 38:24
- Label: Mercury
- Producers: Jeremy Green; Topper Headon

Professional ratings
Review scores
Source	Rating
AllMusic	3/5 stars

Waking Up is the debut solo studio album by Topper Headon, best known as the drummer of the Clash. The album was released by Mercury in 1986 with a cover photograph taken by Tim White. "Leave It to Luck" was released as a single and as part of an EP. The album was dedicated to the memory of Pete Farndon.

== Track listing ==
All tracks composed and arranged by Topper Headon, except where indicated.

1. "Leave It to Luck"
2. "I'll Give You Everything"
3. "Hope for Donna"
4. "Got to Keep on Going"
5. "Dancing"
6. "Pleasure and Pain"
7. "When You're Down"
8. "Time Is Tight" (Booker T. Jones, Steve Cropper, Donald "Duck" Dunn, Al Jackson Jr.)
9. "Just Another Hit"
10. "Monkey on My Back"

== Personnel ==
- Topper Headon - drums, percussion
- Martin Dobson - saxophone
- Mick Gallagher - keyboards
- Mark Graham - trombone
- Tom Harris - saxophone
- Jimmy Helms - vocals
- Jerome Rimson - bass, vocals
- Bob Tench - guitar, vocals
- Geoffrey Miller - trumpet, flugelhorn
- Robert Johnson - guitar on ("Just Another Hit")
