= Night Out (album) =

Studio album by Ellen Foley
- Released: September 1979
- Recorded: 1979
- Studio: Mediasound and The Power Station (New York City, New York)
- Genre: Rock
- Length: 37:24
- Label: Cleveland International; Epic
- Producer: Ian Hunter; Mick Ronson

Ellen Foley chronology
Night Out (1979)	Spirit of St. Louis (1981)

Professional ratings
Review scores
Source	Rating
Music Week	3/4 stars

Night Out is the 1979 debut studio album by Ellen Foley, a long-time backup vocalist for Meat Loaf. Seven of the nine tracks were cover versions of Foley's favorite songs, while two were co-written by Foley, one of which was "We Belong to the Night", which hit #1 in the Netherlands and #31 in Australia around Christmas of 1979. The musicians were mostly from Ian Hunter's touring band for his 1979 album You're Never Alone with a Schizophrenic, with the addition of Australian musician Kerryn Tolhurst on slide guitar.

Hunter and ex-Spiders From Mars guitarist Mick Ronson produced the album. Ronson suggested the two Philip Rambow songs and the piano backing for the final track "Don't Let Go", written by Hunter.

== Track listing ==
No.	Title	Writer(s)	Length
1.	"We Belong to the Night"	Ellen Foley, Fred Goodman	5:24
2.	"What's a Matter Baby (Is It Hurting You)" (Timi Yuro cover)	Joy Byers, Clyde Otis	3:47
3.	"Stupid Girl" (Rolling Stones cover)	Mick Jagger, Keith Richards	4:09
4.	"Night Out"	Philip Rambow	5:21
5.	"Thunder and Rain" (Graham Parker cover)	Graham Parker	3:04
6.	"Sad Song" (Mark Middler cover)	Mark Middler, Peter Mason	3:31
7.	"Young Lust"	Philip Rambow	5:34
8.	"Hideaway"	Ellen Foley, Fred Goodman	3:50
9.	"Don't Let Go"	Ian Hunter	4:04

== Charts ==
=== Weekly charts ===
Chart (1979–1980)	Peak position
Australian Albums (Kent Music Report)	13
Canadian Albums (RPM)	71
Dutch Albums (Album Top 100)	2
German Albums (Offizielle Top 100)	31
Swedish Albums (Sverigetopplistan)	28
UK Albums (OCC)	68

=== Year-end charts ===
Chart (1979)	Position
Dutch Albums (Album Top 100)	38
Chart (1980)	Position
Dutch Albums (Album Top 100)	34

== Certifications ==
Region	Certification	Certified units/sales
Australia (ARIA)	Gold	20,000^{^}
Netherlands (NVPI)	Gold	50,000^{^}
^{^} Shipments figures based on certification alone.

== Personnel ==
- Ellen Foley – vocals
- Mick Ronson – keyboards, lead guitars, percussion, string arrangements, harmony vocals
- Ian Hunter – keyboards, guitars, percussion
- Tommy Mandel – keyboards
- Kerryn Tolhurst – slide guitar
- Martin Briley – bass
- Hilly Michaels – drums
- Rory Dodd – harmony vocals

=== Production ===
- Ian Hunter – producer, arrangements
- Mick Ronson – producer, arrangements
- Bob Clearmountain – engineer
- Harvey Goldberg – engineer
- Phil Shrago – assistant engineer
- Bob Ludwig – mastering at Masterdisk (New York, NY)
- Gene Grief – design
- Benno Friedman – photography
