= Have a Good Time but Get Out Alive! =

Studio album by Iron City Houserockers
- Released: June 6, 1980
- Recorded: 1980
- Studio: Mediasound, New York City
- Genre: Heartland rock
- Length: 40:44
- Label: MCA
- Producer: The Slimmer Twins (Steve Popovich and Marty Mooney), Mick Ronson, Steven Van Zandt (uncredited)

Iron City Houserockers chronology
Love's So Tough (1979)	Have a Good Time but Get Out Alive! (1980)	Blood on the Bricks (1981)

Singles from Have a Good Time But Get Out Alive!
- 1. "Hypnotized" Released: July 1980; 2. "Junior's Bar" Released: October 1980; 3. "We're Not Dead Yet" Released: 1980

Professional ratings
Review scores
Source	Rating
AllMusic	4.5/5 stars
Robert Christgau	B−
Creem	Very favorable
Rolling Stone	Very favorable
The Village Voice	Very favorable

Have a Good Time But Get Out Alive! is a studio album by the Iron City Houserockers. Although well-received critically, commercial success eluded the Iron City Houserockers outside of the rust belt. Among the strongest tracks are the title track, "Don't Let Them Push You Around", "We're Not Dead Yet", the two-part medley of "Old Man Bar" and Junior's Bar", and "Rock Ola" - Grushecky's first truly competent ballad.

== Background ==
According to the liner notes present on the 1999 and 2020 reissues, E Street Band guitarist Steven Van Zandt produced and arranged five songs ("Junior's Bar", "Angela", "Running Scared", "Blondie", and "Don't Let Them Push You Around"), assisted in re-writing "Blondie" from its original version, and played lead guitar on "Junior's Bar" before leaving due to creative differences with Ian Hunter and Mick Ronson. The version of "Junior's Bar" released as a single is an entirely different take than the album version. This version was only available on the original 1980 vinyl single until it was reissued on CD on the 1992 compilation Pumping Iron & Sweating Steel: The Best Of Iron City Houserockers by Rhino Records.

The album was reissued on CD in remastered form for its 40th anniversary in 2020 by Cleveland International Records with a bonus CD of previously unreleased outtakes and demos.

== Track listing ==
=== Side one ===
1. "Have a Good Time (But Get Out Alive)" (Joe Grushecky) – 3:49
2. "Don't Let Them Push You Around" (Grushecky) – 2:23
3. "Pumping Iron" (Grushecky) – 3:54
4. "Hypnotized" (Grushecky, Gil Snyder) – 3:20
5. "Price of Love" (Grushecky, Snyder) – 4:04
6. "Angela" (Grushecky) – 3:17

=== Side two ===
1. "We're Not Dead Yet" (Dan Beck, Grushecky, Snyder) – 3:01
2. "Blondie" (Grushecky) – 2:44
3. "Old Man Bar" (Bob Boyer, Eddie Britt, Snyder) – 3:14
4. "Junior's Bar" (Britt, Grushecky, Snyder) – 4:17
5. "Runnin' Scared" (Grushecky, Art Nardini, Snyder) – 3:49
6. "Rock Ola" (Grushecky) – 2:52

=== 40th anniversary edition bonus tracks ===
1. "Have a Good Time (But Get Out Alive)" (Demo) (Grushecky) - 5:06
2. "Don't Let Them Push You Around" (Demo) (Grushecky) – 6:20
3. "Pumping Iron" (Demo) (Grushecky) – 4:11
4. "Don't Stop the Music" (Demo) (Grushecky) - 3:47
5. "Angela" (Demo) (Grushecky) – 3:18
6. "Price of Love" (Demo) (Grushecky, Snyder) – 3:57
7. "Hold Out" (Demo) (Grushecky) - 3:48
8. "Rock Ola" (Demo) (Grushecky) – 3:13
9. "Struggle & Die" (Demo) (Grushecky, Beck) - 5:03
10. "Rock Ola" (Extended) (Grushecky) – 4:27
11. "Charlena" (Grushecky) – 2:40
12. "Runnin' Scared" (Demo) (Grushecky, Nardini, Snyder) – 2:44
13. "Runnin' Scared" (Alternate) (Grushecky, Nardini, Snyder) – 3:54
14. "Hypnotized" (A Work in Progress) (Grushecky, Snyder) – 7:48
15. "Rooster Blues" (J.D. Miller) - 3:02
16. "Doo Wah Diddy" (Jeff Barry, Ellie Greenwich) - 1:44

"Hypnotized" was produced by Ian Hunter. "Don't Let Them Push You Around", "Angela", "Blondie", "Junior's Bar" and "Runnin' Scared" were arranged by Steven Van Zandt.

== Personnel ==
Iron City Houserockers

- Joe Grushecky - lead vocals, guitar
- Eddie Britt - guitar, background vocals
- Art Nardini - bass guitar
- Gil Snyder - keyboards, background vocals, lead vocals on "Old Man Bar", cover design
- Ned E. Rankin - drums
- Marc Reisman - harmonica, background vocals

with:

- Tommy Mandel – organ on "Price of Love"
- Mick Ronson – piano on "Rock Ola", mandolin on "Old Man Bar"
- Steven Van Zandt - guitar on "Junior's Bar"
- Joey Miskulin – accordion on "Old Man Bar"
- Ian Hunter – guitar, background vocals, piano on "Hypnotized"
- Roy Martin – background vocals on "Have a Good Time"
- Ellen Foley – background vocals on "Junior's Bar"

== Chart performance ==
Year	Chart	Peak position
1980	Billboard Bubbling Under the Top LP's	204
