= Mirkwood (band) =

MIRKWOOD
- Genres: Psychedelic rock
- Years active: 1971–1978
- Labels: Red Admiral Records

Mirkwood were a British psychedelic rock band formed in early 1971 by guitarists Mick Morris and Jack Castle. The band's ancestry can be traced to the original Dover-based, Rolling Stones, a skiffle and blues band formed in 1956.

When Mirkwood's original drummer Steve Smith left, his replacement was Nick 'Topper' Headon, who occupied the drum chair for a year and a half, during which time Mirkwood supplemented their own gigs by working as support to bigger name acts including Supertramp. Topper Headon eventually left Mirkwood and joined The Clash. The band made its final appearance (at the Marlowe Theatre, Canterbury) in July 1978.

Mirkwood recorded one eponymous album of original material released in 1973 on the Flams record label (PR 1067). Some years later, the Mirkwood album had become the most expensive listed in Record Collector magazine. It has since been re-released several times, most recently in 2008 on Red Admiral Records, (REDAD CDA556). A review of the album by Classic Rock Society magazine described it as " ..... a fine piece of work .... (combining) slick guitar work, thrilling vocals and imaginative composition and arrangements ...... from a band that could have gone on to great things".

Morris and Castle played occasional gigs together in the Kent area, and reunited in 2015 to release the album Boys from the Chalk.
