= Cracking Under Pressure =

Studio album by Iron City Houserockers
- Released: December 1983
- Recorded: 1983
- Genre: Rock
- Length: 41:40
- Label: MCA
- Producer: Mark Dodson

Iron City Houserockers chronology
Blood on the Bricks (1981)	Cracking Under Pressure (1983)	Pumping Iron & Sweating Steel: The Best of Iron City Houserockers (1992)

Cracking Under Pressure is a 1983 studio album by the Iron City Houserockers. Cracking Under Pressure was the Iron City Houserockers' fourth and final album under the moniker (changed slightly) and also their final album released under MCA. Veterans Ned E. Rankin and Marc Reisman had left the band and in their place was heavy keyboards and synthesizers, as was the style at the time. Also unlike previous albums, Cracking Under Pressure included several cover songs: "Loving Cup" by Earth Quake and "Hit the Road Jack" by Percy Mayfield. The songs "Angels", "Cracking Under Pressure", and "There'll Never be Enough Time" have appeared on several later compilations (and an acoustic version of "Never Be Enough Time" appeared on Grushecky's mid-nineties solo album, "American Babylon"), most of the rest of this album is absent from later compilations and live shows. The band was dropped from MCA Records two days after the album was released, and six months after that - in June 1984 - the band broke up. When the band resurfaced in 1989, it would go by "Joe Grushecky & The Houserockers" - the name by which they still tour today.

The album has never been issued on CD, but is available as a digital download from Joe Grushecky's official website.

== Track listing ==
1. "Rock and Roll Heart" (Eddie Britt, Joe Grushecky, Art Nardini) - 3:16
2. "Loving Cup" (Ken Laguna, Earthquake) - 3:29
3. "Angels" (Britt, Grushecky) - 3:36
4. "Hit the Road Jack" (Percy Mayfield) - 3:12
5. "American Son" (Grushecky) - 3:53
6. "Girl Problems" (Grushecky) - 3:36
7. "Cracking Under Pressure" (Britt, Grushecky, Nardini) - 4:50
8. "Breaking Point" (Britt, Grushecky) - 3:37
9. "Soul Rockin'" (Grushecky) - 3:13
10. "I Should've Never Let You Go" (Grushecky) - 3:55
11. "There'll Never Be Enough Time" (Grushecky) - 4:46

== Personnel ==
- Joe Grushecky - lead vocal, guitar
- Eddie Britt - lead guitar (credited as Eddy Britt)
- Art Nardini - bass
- Gil Snyder - keyboards
- Ron Foster - drums
