= American Babylon =

Studio album by Joe Grushecky & the Houserockers
- Released: 1995
- Label: Razor & Tie
- Producer: Bruce Springsteen

Joe Grushecky & the Houserockers chronology
End of the Century (1992)	American Babylon (1995)	Coming Home (1997)

American Babylon is an album by Joe Grushecky & the Houserockers, released in 1995. Grushecky supported the album by playing some East Coast and Midwest shows with Bruce Springsteen, his producer.

== Production ==
The album was produced by Springsteen, who also cowrote "Homestead" and "Dark and Bloody Ground"; Grushecky and Rick Witkowski also contributed. It was recorded at Springsteen's Los Angeles home studio over a period of 18 months. Springsteen played on the album, and Patti Scialfa sang on "Comin' Down Maria".

The songs Grushecky wrote were less personal than those on his previous album, End of the Century, and more about universal themes and the state of America. The album cover photos were shot by Pamela Springsteen.

== Critical reception ==
Professional ratings
Review scores
Source	Rating
AllMusic	4/5 stars
Chicago Sun-Times	3.5/4 stars
The Encyclopedia of Popular Music	4/5 stars
Los Angeles Times	1.5/4 stars
MusicHound Rock: The Essential Album Guide	2/5 stars
Pittsburgh Post-Gazette	3.5/4 stars
The Republican	3/5 stars

Rolling Stone praised Grushecky's "fine line in juke-blues hooks and a spare way with words." The Los Angeles Times wrote that "the Darkness on the Edge of Town aura is inescapable, though Grushecky's limited writing and gravel-gargle voice rarely transcend journeyman status." The Republican concluded that "Grushecky is a cool rockin' daddy in his own right, not a great vocalist, but strong enough to blend upper octave smoothness on 'Chain Smokin'."

The New York Times stated: "For Mr. Grushecky's new songs, the Houserockers have turned into a western auxiliary of the E Street Band. Often, the first verse uses a basic guitar strum and a light drumbeat; the full band kicks in on the second verse, arriving like a rescue team to turn the humdrum into the heroic." Stereo Review thought that "Grushecky's cigarette-rasp voice falls somewhere between that of Southside Johnny and Willy DeVille ... his plainspoken delivery is set off by stark, skeletal arrangements." The Chicago Sun-Times called "No Strings Attached" "Grushecky's best anthem since the glory days of his Iron City Houserockers."

AllMusic wrote that "there are plenty of songs outlining love gone wrong and the struggles of common folk, all delivered in Grushecky's warm, well-worn voice over a barroom mixture of blues-based traditional rock."

== Track listing ==
All tracks are written by Joe Grushecky, except where noted.

No.	Title	Writer(s)	Length
1.	"Dark & Bloody Ground"	Bruce Springsteen, Grushecky
2.	"Chain Smokin'"
3.	"Never Be Enough Time"
4.	"American Babylon"
5.	"Labor of Love"
6.	"What Did You Do in the War"
7.	"Homestead"	Springsteen, Grushecky
8.	"Comin' Down Maria"
9.	"Talk Show"
10.	"No Strings Attached"
11.	"Billy's Waltz"	Bill Toms, Grushecky
12.	"Only Lovers Left Alive"
