= Iron City Houserockers =

US musical group

- Also known as: Brick Alley Band (1976–1977); The Houserockers (1983–1984)
- Origin: Pittsburgh, Pennsylvania, U.S.
- Genres: Heartland rock, hard rock, rock and roll
- Years active: 1976–1984
- Labels: MCA, Rhino
- Past members: Joe Grushecky; Gil Snyder; Ned Rankin; Art Nardini; Gary Scalese; Marc Reisman; Eddie Britt; Ron "Byrd" Foster; Clay "Marty" Moore
- Website: joegrushecky.com

The Iron City Houserockers were an American rock band from Pittsburgh, Pennsylvania, led by the singer and guitarist Joe Grushecky, from 1976 to 1984.

== History ==
Started in 1976 as the Brick Alley Band by Grushecky, a high school special education teacher in Pittsburgh, the band was a fairly typical bar band. It was distinguished by Grushecky's taut, focused songs about life in the heartland and a distinctive, harmonica-and-guitar-driven sound owing much to the Rolling Stones and the J. Geils Band, but which also seemed to borrow the thrashing fury of punk rock. Most of the members of the Iron City Houserockers came from a genuine blue-collar background: Art Nardini was the son of a mechanic and a part-time college student, Joe Grushecky was a coal miner's son, and Gil Snyder's father was a construction worker. In 1977 they signed with Cleveland International Records, headed by former Epic Records A&R chief and Pittsburgh native Steve Popovich. Popovich christened them the Iron City Houserockers, but this caused some problems when touring outside their native Pittsburgh—when they played Cleveland their tires were slashed. The band's debut album, Love's So Tough, was released in April 1979. With dense, no-frills production by Popovich and Marty Mooney (“The Slimmer Twins”), the album successfully captured the band's live sound. "Hideaway" (the first single) and "Dance With Me" were viewed as standout cuts.

The band's follow-up album, Have a Good Time but Get Out Alive!, was featured in Rolling Stone magazine as its showcase review, with the headline "New American Classic", and The Village Voice called it "the strongest album an American band has made this year." The tandem tavern-set tracks "Old Man Bar" and "Junior's Bar" were especially praised. Production was credited to the Slimmer Twins and Mick Ronson, with arrangements by Ian Hunter and Steven Van Zandt. According to the liner notes within Pumping Iron & Sweating Steel: The Best of the Iron City Houserockers, Van Zandt left after producing five songs, because of musical differences between him, Hunter and Ronson.

The Houserockers' third album, Blood on the Bricks, was produced by Steve Cropper. The 1983 edition of Rolling Stone Record Guide praised it as the band's best album, although it had good marks for all of them.

The band then changed its name to simply the Houserockers to avoid the geographic limitation the "Iron City" moniker had put them in. It also shed the harmonica player Marc Reisman. Ned Rankin quit and was replaced by Ron "Byrd" Foster (from the recently disbanded Silencers, previously with Sweet Lightning and Roy Buchanan's band), and Gil Snyder added synthesizers to his trademark piano and organ. The subsequent album, Cracking Under Pressure, like all the band's previous efforts, drew critical raves but did not sell well. The band was dropped from MCA Records, shortly after the album's release, and broke up a few months later.

Joe Grushecky went on to a modestly successful career on his own, often under the name Joe Grushecky and the Houserockers. He has co-written several songs with another heartland rocker, Bruce Springsteen, and made a number of appearances on stage with him.

The Iron City Houserockers' first two albums, Love's So Tough and Have a Good Time but Get Out Alive! were released on compact disc in 1999. Blood on the Bricks and Cracking Under Pressure are still unreleased on CD, but cuts from both albums are included on Pumping Iron & Sweating Steel: The Best of the Iron City Houserockers.

Ron "Byrd" Foster died at the age of 61 on June 30, 2011, in Deltona, Florida, from liver cancer.

== Lineup ==
- Joe Grushecky, rhythm guitar, vocals
- Gary Scalese, lead guitar (first album)
- Eddie Britt, lead guitar (second, third and fourth albums)
- Art Nardini, bass
- Gil Snyder, keyboards, accordion
- Ned Rankin, drums (first three albums, Rock & Real)
- Ron "Byrd" Foster, drums (Cracking Under Pressure)
- Clay "Marty" Moore, guitar (live performances only, 1984)
- Marc Reisman, harmonica (first three albums, True Companion)
- Joffo Simmons, drums, percussion (after the fourth album)
- Bill Toms, guitars (after fourth album)
- Joe Pelesky, keyboards (after fifth album)
- Bob Boyer, soundman (first four albums)
- Jay Flory, road manager, lights
- Johnny Grushecky, acoustic guitar (A Good Life and East Carson Street)
- Danny Gochnour, lead guitar (joined 2006; "East Carson Street", "Not Dead Yet")
- John Farr, stage manager, guitar tech
- Bob Matso, keyboards, vocal (Stand Up/Victory)
- Jeff "Swizz" Sinicki, guitar and drums tech

== Discography ==
=== Albums ===
- 1979: Love's So Tough
- 1980: Have a Good Time but Get Out Alive!
- 1981: Blood on the Bricks
- 1983: Cracking Under Pressure (as "The Houserockers")

=== Compilation albums ===
- 1992: Pumping Iron & Sweating Steel: The Best of the Iron City Houserockers
- 2024: Houserocker: A Joe Gruschecky Anthology

=== Singles ===
- 1979: "Hideaway"
- 1980: "Hypnotized"
- 1980: "Junior's Bar"
- 1980: "We're Not Dead Yet"
- 1981: "Friday Night"
