= Blood on the Bricks (Iron City Houserockers album) =

1981 studio album by the Iron City Houserockers

Studio album by Iron City Houserockers
- Released: 1981
- Recorded: 1981
- Genre: Rock
- Length: 37:34
- Label: MCA
- Producer: Steve Cropper

Iron City Houserockers chronology
Have a Good Time but Get out Alive! (1980)	Blood on the Bricks (1981)	Cracking Under Pressure (1983)

Singles from Blood on the Bricks
- 1. "Friday Night" Released: 1981

Professional ratings
Review scores
Source	Rating
Allmusic	3/5 stars

Blood on the Bricks is a studio album by the Iron City Houserockers released in 1981. A more restrained album than their previous two efforts, the album was produced by Steve Cropper (of Booker T. and the M.G.'s) instead of hard rock producers as on Have a Good Time but Get out Alive!. Among the more popular songs on the album were the title track, along with "Saints and Sinners" (a song about a Vietnam veteran), and "Be My Friend" which includes a guitar riff in tribute to Van Morrison's "Here Comes the Night"; all of which still feature in Joe Grushecky's modern live performances. Like the band's previous two albums, Blood on the Bricks would be praised by critics but largely ignored by the public. Before their next album the band would change their name to simply "The Houserockers" in an attempt to achieve success outside of their native region.

The album was reissued in download-only remastered form as a digital download from Grushecky's official website in 2015. Most recently, the album was finally reissued on CD by Omnivore Recordings on March 28, 2025, along with a bonus disc of outtakes, demos, and rare live recordings.

== Track listing ==
1. Friday Night (Joe Grushecky) - 3:51
2. Saints and Sinners (Grushecky) - 4:24
3. This Time the Night (Won't Save Us) (Eddie Britt, Grushecky, Art Nardini) - 3:56
4. Be My Friend (Grushecky) - 4:20
5. No Easy Way Out (Grushecky) - 3:21
6. No More Loneliness (Grushecky) - 3:54
7. Watch Out (Britt, Grushecky, Gil Snyder) - 4:18
8. Blood on the Bricks (Grushecky) - 4:19
9. A Fool's Advice (Grushecky) - 5:11

== Personnel ==
- Joe Grushecky - lead vocal, guitar
- Eddie Britt - guitar, vocals
- Art Nardini - bass
- Gil Snyder - keyboards, vocals
- Ned E. Rankin - drums
- Marc Reisman - harmonica, vocals

=== Guest musicians ===
- Steve Cropper - guitar (solo "This Time The Night")
- Jim Horn - saxophone
- Steve Forman - percussion
- Steve Madeo - trumpet
- Brick Alley Boys Town Choir - background vocals
