= Topper Headon =

British drummer (born 1955)

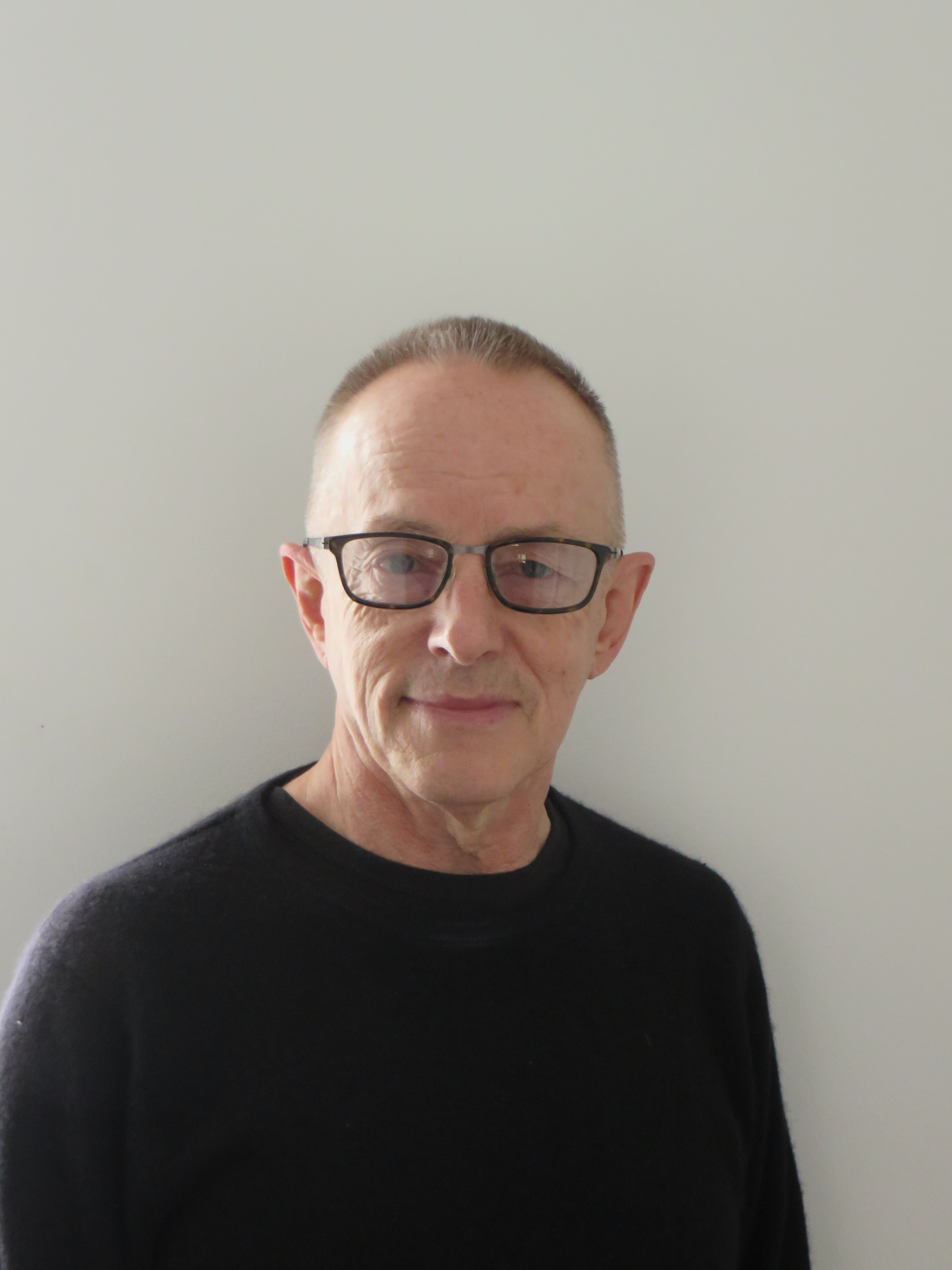
- Headon in 2018

Background information
- Also known as: Topper
- Born: Nicholas Bowen Headon; 30 May 1955 (age 71); Bromley, Kent, England
- Genres: Jazz; soul; R&B; rock; punk rock; new wave; reggae; rock and roll
- Occupations: Musician; songwriter
- Instruments: Drums; piano; bass guitar; guitar
- Years active: 1973–present
- Formerly of: The Clash; Mirkwood

Nicholas Bowen "Topper" Headon (born 30 May 1955) is an English drummer and multi-instrumentalist, best known as the drummer of punk rock band the Clash. Headon was inducted in the Rock and Roll Hall of Fame with the rest of the Clash in 2003.

He joined the Clash in 1977 and became famed for his drumming skills. He received his nickname owing to his resemblance to Mickey the Monkey from the Topper comic.

== Early life ==
Headon spent his early childhood in Crockenhill, northwest Kent, before attending Dover Grammar School for Boys. He started playing drums at an early age and was a jazz fan, citing Billy Cobham as a strong influence. In 1973, he joined the cult progressive rock outfit Mirkwood. He appeared with them for a year and a half, and they supported major acts such as Supertramp. He later played with a band that opened for American R&B legends the Temptations and admits to falsely claiming that he played with the Temptations.

== The Clash ==
I knew Mick [Jones] a year and half ago. For a week I played with the London SS. I really wanted to join the Clash. I want to give them even more energy than they've got – if that's possible.

— Topper Headon

Originally Headon had joined the Clash in 1977 with the intention of establishing a reputation as a drummer before moving on to other projects, but he soon realised their full potential and remained with them for four-and-a-half years. His first live performance was at Le Chartreux Cinema, Rouen, France on 26 April 1977. Headon appeared on the albums Give 'Em Enough Rope (1978), The Clash (1979 US version), London Calling (1979), Sandinista! (1980) and Combat Rock (1982), as well as several landmark singles the Clash recorded during their early period. He performed lead vocal on "Ivan Meets G.I. Joe" from Sandinista! and composed most of the music and played drums, piano and bass guitar on the hit single "Rock the Casbah" from Combat Rock. He also appeared on Super Black Market Clash (1993), which included B-sides from the band's single releases.

Clash singer/guitarist Joe Strummer said Headon's drumming skills were a vital part of the band. Tensions rose between Headon and his fellow band members due to his addiction, and he left the band on 10 May 1982, at the beginning of the Combat Rock tour. The band covered up the real reason for Headon's departure, the apparent growing use of heroin, claiming Headon's exit was due to exhaustion. Strummer had even asked Headon once: "How can I be singing anti-drug songs with you sitting behind me?"

In a later interview for the rockumentary The Clash: Westway to the World, he apologised for his addiction and speculated that, had he not been asked to leave the Clash, the band might have lasted longer and might possibly still be together. He also lamented that the best known Clash line-up had been considering a reunion at the time of Strummer's death, after the positive reunion during the Westway to the World rockumentary.

== After the Clash ==
After leaving the Clash, he was considered as drummer in Mick Jones's post-Clash band Big Audio Dynamite and played in a short-lived group called Samurai, with bassist Pete Farndon, guitarist Henry Padovani (from the Police), organist Mick Gallagher (from the Blockheads), and vocalist Steve Allen (formerly of Deaf School). Headon subsequently focused on recording a solo album, Waking Up (1986), which featured Mick Gallagher, Bobby Tench and Jimmy Helms. He also released a cover version of the Gene Krupa instrumental "Drumming Man" as a single, which featured Headon's "DuKane Road" on the B-side. His own composition "Hope for Donna" was included on the Mercury Records sampler Beat Runs Wild, in the same year. During the 1980s Headon produced albums for New York band Bush Tetras. In 1989 he contributed drums to the punk rock band Chelsea's Underwraps (1989).

During the late 1980s Headon drove mini-cabs to finance his heroin addiction, and later busked on the London Underground with bongo drums.

After a live show in 2002, he was informed of the death of Clash frontman Joe Strummer. An emotional Headon stated:

It's taken Joe's death to make me realise just how big the Clash were. We were a political band and Joe was the one who wrote the lyrics. Joe was one of the truest guys you could ever meet. If he said 'I am behind you', then you knew he meant it 100 percent.

Headon was extensively interviewed for the Joe Strummer: The Future Is Unwritten documentary film about the late Clash frontman, which was released in 2007. Headon related his experiences during this period, how he became addicted to heroin and how there were problems before his dismissal. Headon also stated that seeing the video of "Rock the Casbah" with "someone else (Terry Chimes) in my place playing my song" caused him to fall in even greater depression and heavier drug addiction.

On 11 January 2008, he performed with Carbon/Silicon at the Carbon Casino Club in Portobello London, being included with the line-up of Mick Jones, Tony James, Leo Williams and Dominic Greensmith. Headon joined the band on stage during the Clash's "Train in Vain (Stand by Me)". An encore followed with Headon playing drums on "Should I Stay or Should I Go". This performance marked the first time since 1982 that Headon and Jones had performed together on stage.

In a February 2008 newspaper article Headon revealed that in 2003 he started to experience serious back pain, a frequent complaint of ageing rock drummers. Diagnosed with hyperkyphosis, a forward curvature of the back, he underwent intense posture adjustment treatment and continues to exercise daily. He notes that, on his recent appearance with Jones, he exhibited his new upright stance.

At some point in the 1980s, Headon contracted Hepatitis C, which, along with his alcohol intake, led to severe liver problems. Headon successfully underwent interferon treatment for his hepatitis in 2007 and became a spokesman for the Hepatitis C Trust.

The BBC featured Headon in a February 2009 feature on drumming as therapy. He shares some of his story in a brief video interview. In 2012 Headon was interviewed by fellow drummer Spike Webb, sharing stories from his years drumming for the Clash and his experience writing 'Rock The Casbah'.

Actor Alex Gold portrayed Headon in the 2016 film London Town, which tells the story of a Clash-obsessed teenager who crosses paths with Joe Strummer by happenstance in 1979 and finds his life changing as a result.

== Drumming style ==
As a drummer, Headon often employed a distinctive style which emphasised a simple bass-snare up-down beat, accentuated with closed hi-hat flourishes. Such a method can be found in the songs "Clash City Rockers", "Clampdown", "Train in Vain", and "Lost in the Supermarket". His drumming on "Train in Vain" has been characterised as one of the most important and distinctive beats in rock music. Scott Kenemore of PopMatters writes, "his contribution to the music was tremendous, and his drumming remains an undiscovered treasure for too many."

== Discography ==
=== With the Clash ===
- Give 'Em Enough Rope (1978)
- The Clash (1979 U.S. release of the album; originally released in 1977, Headon plays drums on "Clash City Rockers", "Complete Control", "(White Man) In Hammersmith Palais", "I Fought the Law", and "Jail Guitar Doors")
- London Calling (1979)
- Sandinista! (1980)
- Combat Rock (1982)
- Super Black Market Clash (1980/1993) drums on all tracks except on "1977" and "Listen"

=== Solo discography ===
Topper Headon has released one studio album, one EP, and three singles as a solo artist and featured on several other artists' albums.

==== Studio albums ====
Year	Title	Record label	Notes
1986	Waking Up	Mercury 826 779-1	with guitarist Bobby Tench
1986	Beat Runs Wild	Mercury	Mercury Records sampler. Topper Headon features on track B5. "Hope for Donna"

==== EPs ====
Year	Title	Label	Notes
1985	Leave It to Luck / East Versus West / Got to Get Out of This Heat S.O.S / Casablanca	Mercury	with guitarist Bobby Tench

==== Singles ====
Year	Title	Album	AUS	Label
1985	"Drumming Man"		97	Mercury
1986	"Leave It to Luck"	Waking Up	-	Mercury
1986	"I'll Give You Everything"	Waking Up	-	Mercury
