= Heartland rock =

Genre of rock music

- Stylistic origins: Rock and roll; roots rock; rhythm and blues; garage rock; folk rock; country; folk; country rock
- Cultural origins: Late 1970s, Midwestern and Southern United States

Regional scenes
- Midwestern United States and the Rust Belt

Local scenes
- Jersey Shore sound

Other topics
- Working class; alienation; alternative country; roots rock; Southern rock

Heartland rock is a genre of rock music characterized by a straightforward, often roots musical style, often with a focus on blue-collar workers, and a conviction that rock music has a social or communal purpose beyond just entertainment.

The genre is exemplified by singer-songwriters Tom Petty, Bob Seger, Bruce Springsteen, Jackson Browne, Michael Stanley, and John Mellencamp and country music artists, including Steve Earle and Joe Ely. The genre developed in the 1970s and reached its commercial peak in the 1980s when it became one of the best-selling genres in the United States. In the 1990s, many established acts faded and the genre began to fragment, but the major figures have continued to record with commercial success.

== Characteristics ==
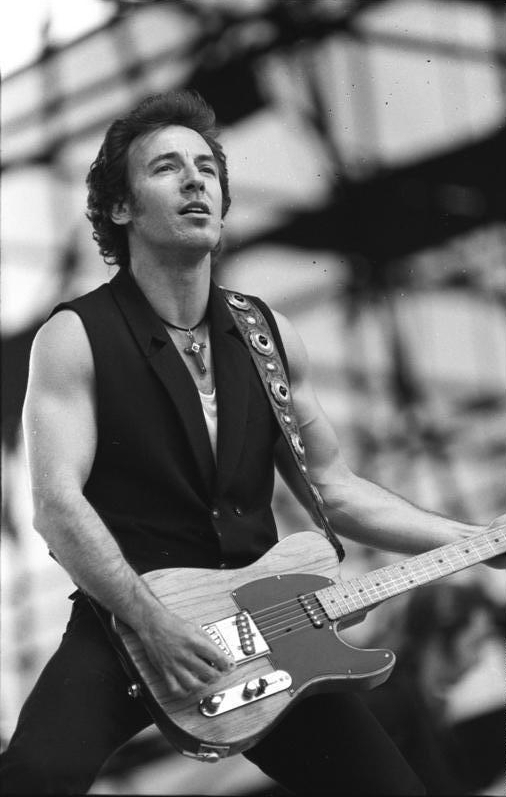
Bruce Springsteen, the most commercially successful act in the genre of heartland rock, performing in East Berlin in 1988

The term heartland rock was not coined to describe a clear genre until the 1980s. In terms of style, it often uses straightforward rock music, sometimes with elements of Americana with a basic rhythm and blues line-up of drums, keyboards and occasional horn section instruments like a saxophone. However, this common definition may represent an oversimplification given that Bruce Springsteen's Born in the U.S.A. made heavy use of synthesizers, most notably on the hit singles "Dancing in the Dark", "Glory Days" and the title track. Lyrics are often presented in a style that is raspy and unpolished, adding a sense of authenticity. The genre was most strongly influenced by American country, folk, 1960s garage rock, the Rolling Stones, Bob Dylan, and folk rock acts such as Hank Williams, Woody Guthrie, Creedence Clearwater Revival, and the Byrds.

Verses in heartland rock songs often tell stories. In some songs, those stories are about people undergoing hard times; choruses are often anthemic in tone. The genre is associated with working-class regions of the Midwest and the Rust Belt. It has been characterized as a predominantly romantic genre, celebrating "urban backstreets and rooftops", and its major themes include alienation, despair, "unemployment, small-town decline, disillusionment, limited opportunity and bitter nostalgia".

== History ==
=== Origins ===
Many major heartland rock artists began their careers in the 1960s, as with Bob Seger, or the 1970s, as with Springsteen and Tom Petty and the Heartbreakers; the former after two critically highly regarded but modestly selling albums with the E Street Band, he achieved his breakthrough in 1975 with Born to Run, which presented stories of loss, betrayal, defeat and escape in the context of his native New Jersey shoreline, with songs influenced by 1950s rock and roll, Dylan and Phil Spector's Wall of Sound. While Springsteen struggled for three years with legal disputes, other artists in a similar vein came to the fore. These artists included Bob Seger and the Silver Bullet Band, Tom Petty and the Heartbreakers, and fellow Jersey Shore residents Southside Johnny and the Asbury Jukes.

In 1978, Springsteen returned with Darkness on the Edge of Town, which reached the top ten in the US and then the number one album The River (1980), which continued the themes of economic and personal dissolution, produced a series of hit singles, and has been seen as "getting the heartland rock bandwagon rolling", together with the stripped-down sound and darker themes of his next album Nebraska (1982).

=== Peak ===
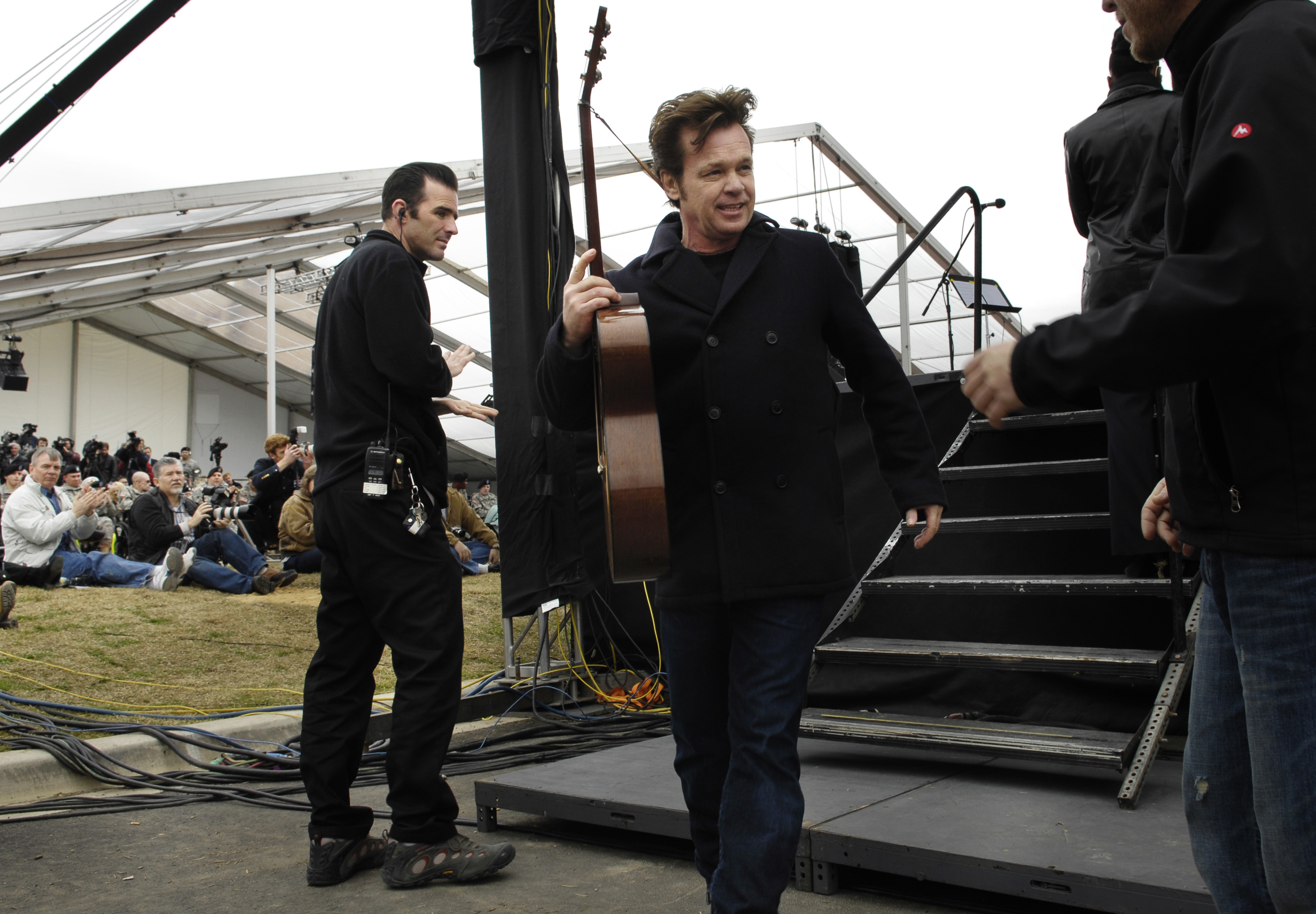
John Mellencamp, shown in 2007, among the most successful of the "second generation" of acts in the genre

The genre reached its commercial peak with Springsteen's Born in the U.S.A. in 1984. The 1980s saw the arrival of new artists such as John Mellencamp, Bruce Hornsby and the Range, Iron City Houserockers, John Hiatt, Lucinda Williams, and BoDeans. A number of roots music and country music artists like Steve Earle, the Tractors, the Hot Club of Cowtown, and Joe Ely also became associated with the genre.

The first significant female artist in the genre was Melissa Etheridge, whose self-titled debut album issued in 1988 drew critical comparisons with Springsteen and Mellencamp.

=== Decline ===
In the 1990s, many artists who would have been heartland rockers in the 1980s chose to pursue the recently emerged genre of Americana, and heartland rock dwindled to a few stalwart artists.

== Influence and legacy ==
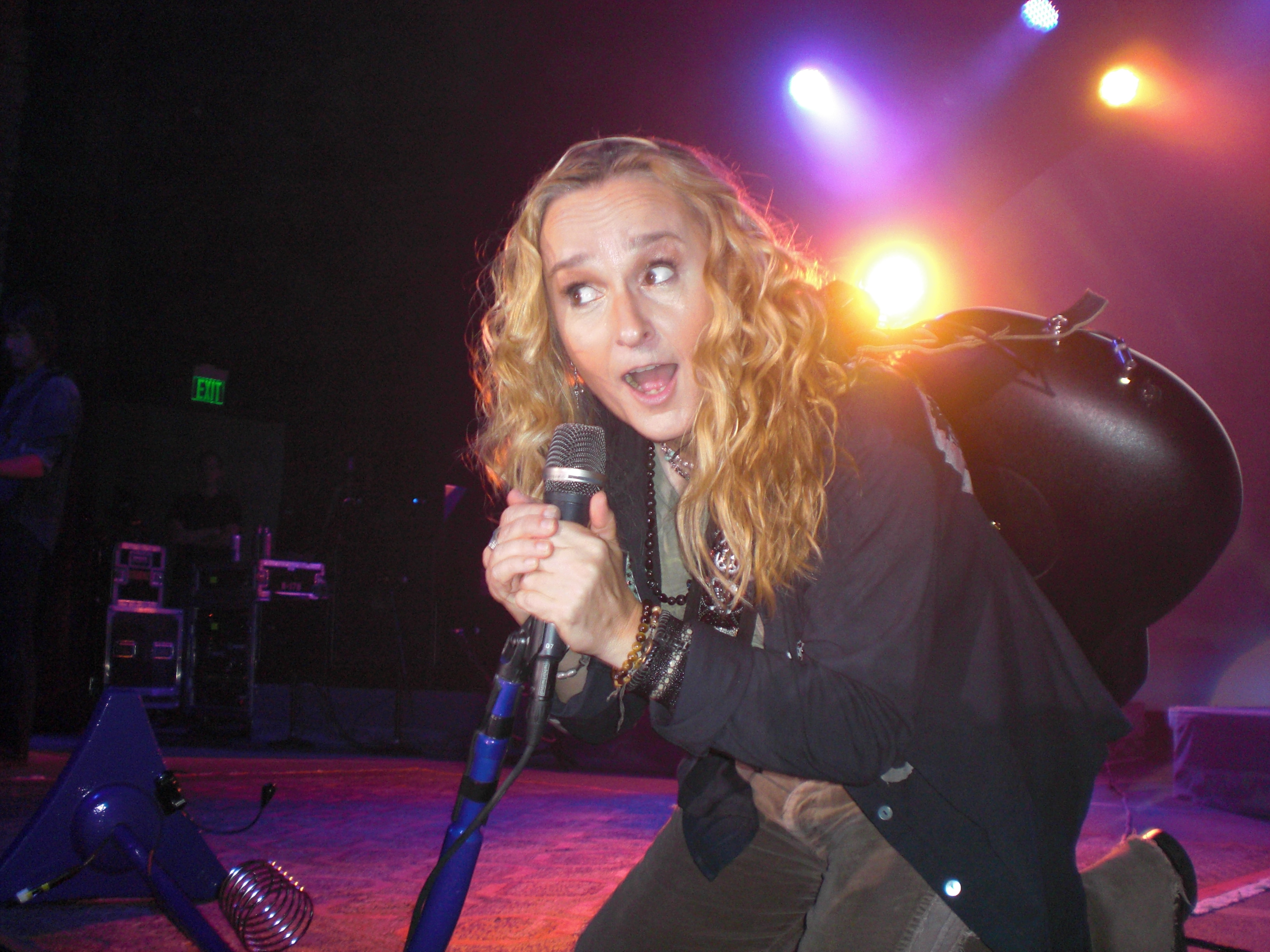
Melissa Etheridge, the first significant female figure in the genre, performing live in 2010

Heartland rock can be heard as an influence on artists as diverse as Billy Joel and Kid Rock, who recorded a duet with Seger for the latter's Face the Promise album. Kid Rock's 2008 hit "All Summer Long" was inspired by Seger's classic "Night Moves" as well as "Sweet Home Alabama" by Lynyrd Skynyrd and "Werewolves of London" by Warren Zevon. Music critic Anthony DeCurtis wrote that on Rock n Roll Jesus, Kid Rock "extends the Seger-Mellencamp tradition of heartland rock". American indie rock bands the Killers and the War on Drugs have been associated with the genre.

British band Dire Straits and English singer-songwriter Sam Fender are known to have established their "British version" of the heartland rock genre.

The influence heartland rock had on a number of punk rock bands led to the development of a sound which Kerrang! writer James MacKinnon termed heartland punk. MacKinnon cited bands in this style as including Social Distortion, the Replacements, the Bouncing Souls, Hot Water Music, Dave Hause, Lucero, Against Me!, the Lawrence Arms, the Menzingers, Japandroids, the Gaslight Anthem and Gang of Youths.

== See also ==
- Americana music
- Country rock
- Heartland (United States)
- Roots rock
- Southern rock
- Bluegrass music
- Gospel music
- Soul music
- R&B
