= Social Distortion discography =

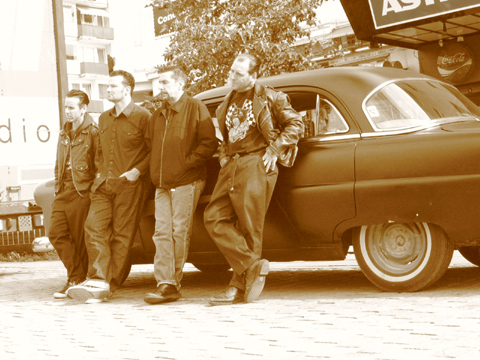
- Social Distortion in Germany in 2005. Left to right: Jonny Wickersham, Brent Harding, Charlie Quintana, and Mike Ness.
- Studio albums: 8
- Extended plays: 1
- Live albums: 1
- Compilation albums: 2
- Singles: 29
- Video albums: 2
- Music videos: 15

The discography of Social Distortion, a Southern California-based punk rock band formed in 1978 by vocalist/guitarist and founder Mike Ness, contains eight studio albums, one extended play (EP), two compilation albums, twenty-nine singles and fifteen music videos.

After releasing a handful of singles between 1980 and 1982, Social Distortion released their first studio album in 1983, titled Mommy's Little Monster. Five years elapsed before Social Distortion's next major release, Prison Bound. While the band still failed to break into mainstream success at the time of its release, critical praise given to Prison Bound garnered attention from major labels, including Epic Records, with whom Social Distortion would eventually sign in 1989.

In 1990, they released their third album, which is self-titled, with the singles "Let It Be Me", "Ball and Chain", "Ring of Fire", "Sick Boy" and "Story of My Life" bringing the band exposure on the United States charts. This album was followed by 1992's Somewhere Between Heaven and Hell, which debuted at number 76 on the Billboard 200 and featured the band's highest charting single "Bad Luck", which reached number 2 on the Modern Rock Tracks chart. Four years elapsed before Social Distortion's next studio album, White Light, White Heat, White Trash, which peaked at #27 on the Billboard 200 in 1996, the band's highest chart position to date, and featured their only Billboard Hot 100 single "I Was Wrong". In 1997, Social Distortion terminated their contract with Epic and decided to stay on TimeBomb Recordings, who reissued their first two albums and released the Mainliner compilation two years earlier.

After the release of the White Light, White Heat, White Trash album, Social Distortion took another hiatus and Ness pursued a solo career and released two albums (Cheating at Solitaire and Under the Influences) in 1999. Tragedy struck on February 29, 2000 when their longtime guitarist Dennis Danell died from an apparent brain aneurysm. After debating whether to break up, or to move on with a new guitarist, Ness decided to hire a new guitarist, Jonny "2 Bags" Wickersham, who would stay with the band permanently. Also during that time, a new drummer, Charlie Quintana, was hired. From 2001 to 2004, the band had been touring semi-frequently, playing sold-out shows in the Los Angeles, California area and other cities. In September 2004, Social Distortion issued their long-awaited sixth album Sex, Love and Rock 'n' Roll, which was their second album to peak in the top 40 of the Billboard 200, at number 31. The album's lead single, "Reach for the Sky", became another one of Social Distortion's biggest hits in the fall of 2004. Prior to the release of that album, longtime bassist John Maurer, who had remained with the band for 20 years, decided to leave Social Distortion and Rancid's Matt Freeman replaced him on tour for a few months and then the band hired their current bassist Brent Harding. Social Distortion released their seventh studio album, Hard Times and Nursery Rhymes, on January 18, 2011.

Born to Kill, the band's eighth studio album and their first in fifteen years, was released on May 8, 2026 and was preceded on February 25, 2026 by the album's title track as the first single.

== Albums ==
=== Studio albums ===
Year	Album	Peak chart positions										Certifications (sales thresholds)
Year	Album	US	US Ind.	AUT	CAN	CHE	FIN	GER	NLD	SWE	UK	Certifications (sales thresholds)
1983	Mommy's Little Monster: Released: June 10, 1983; Label: 13th Floor (original release), Triple-X (1989 re-release), Time Bomb (1995 re-release); Formats: CD, CS, LP, DI	—	—	—	—	—	—	—	—	—	—	
1988	Prison Bound: Released: January 18, 1988; Label: Restless (original release), Time Bomb (1995 re-release); Formats: CD, CS, LP, DI	—	—	—	—	—	—	—	—	—	—	
1990	Social Distortion: Released: March 27, 1990; Label: Epic; Formats: CD, CS, LP, DI	128	—	—	—	—	—	—	—	—	—	US: Gold
1992	Somewhere Between Heaven and Hell: Released: February 11, 1992; Label: Epic; Formats: CD, CS, LP, DI	76	—	—	—	—	—	—	—	—	—	US: Gold
1996	White Light, White Heat, White Trash: Released: September 17, 1996; Label: Epic; Formats: CD, CS, LP, DI	27	—	—	67	—	—	77	—	—	—	
2004	Sex, Love and Rock 'n' Roll: Released: September 28, 2004; Label: Time Bomb; Formats: CD, LP, DI	31	—	—	—	—	—	48	—	29	—	
2011	Hard Times and Nursery Rhymes: Released: January 18, 2011; Label: Epitaph; Formats: CD, LP, DI	4	1	14	19	20	6	3	95	11	169	
2026	Born to Kill: Released: May 8, 2026; Label: Epitaph; Formats: CD, LP, DI	33	5	2	—	3	6	2	—	13	—	
"—" denotes a release that did not chart.

=== Live albums ===
Year	Album details	US
1998	Live at the Roxy: Released: June 30, 1998; Label: Time Bomb; Formats: CD, CS, LP, DI	121

=== Compilation albums ===
Year	Album details	US	US Ind.
1981	Hell Comes to Your House: Released: 1981; Label: Bemisbrain Records; Formats: LP	—	—
1995	Posh Hits Vol. 1: Released: 1982; Label: Posh Boy; Formats: LP	—	—
1995	Mainliner: Wreckage from the Past: Released: July 18, 1995 (recorded in 1981); Label: Time Bomb; Formats: CD, LP, DI	—	—
2004	Rock Against Bush, Vol. 1: Released: April 20, 2004; Label: Fat Wreck Chords; Formats: DVD	—	—
2007	Greatest Hits: Released: June 26, 2007; Label: Time Bomb; Formats: CD, LP, DI	86	7
"—" denotes a release that did not chart.

=== Extended plays ===
Year	EP details
1990	Story of My Life...And Other Stories: Released: 1990; Label: Epic; Formats: CD

== Songs ==
=== Singles ===
Year	Title	Peak chart positions					Album
Year	Title	US	US AAA	US Alt.	US Main.	UK	Album
1981	"Mainliner"/"Playpen"	—	—	—	—	—	non-album track
1982	"1945"	—	—	—	—	—	non-album track
1983	"Another State of Mind"	—	—	—	—	—	Mommy's Little Monster
1988	"Prison Bound"	—	—	—	—	—	Prison Bound
1990	"Let It Be Me"	—	—	11	—	—	Social Distortion
1990	"Ball and Chain"	—	—	13	—	—	Social Distortion
1990	"Ring of Fire"	—	—	25	—	—	Social Distortion
1990	"Sick Boys"	—	—	—	—	—	Social Distortion
1990	"Story of My Life"	—	—	—	—	—	Social Distortion
1992	"Bad Luck"	—	—	2	44	—	Somewhere Between Heaven and Hell
1992	"Born to Lose"	—	—	—	—	—	Somewhere Between Heaven and Hell
1992	"Bye Bye Baby"	—	—	—	—	—	Somewhere Between Heaven and Hell
1992	"Cold Feelings"	—	—	11	—	—	Somewhere Between Heaven and Hell
1992	"When She Begins"	—	—	14	—	—	Somewhere Between Heaven and Hell
1996	"I Was Wrong"	54^{[A]}	—	4	12	163	White Light, White Heat, White Trash
1996	"When the Angels Sing"	—	—	33	32	—	White Light, White Heat, White Trash
1997	"Don't Drag Me Down"	—	—	—	—	—	White Light, White Heat, White Trash
1998	"Story of My Life" (live)	—	—	—	—	—	Live at the Roxy
2004	"Highway 101"	—	—	—	—	—	Sex, Love and Rock 'n' Roll
2004	"Reach for the Sky"	—	—	27	—	—	Sex, Love and Rock 'n' Roll
2005	"Don't Take Me for Granted"	—	—	—	—	—	Sex, Love and Rock 'n' Roll
2005	"Death or Glory"	—	—	—	—	—	Lords of Dogtown soundtrack
2007	"Far Behind"	—	—	19	—	—	Greatest Hits
2010	"Machine Gun Blues"	—	—	10	—	—	Hard Times and Nursery Rhymes
2011	"California (Hustle and Flow)"	—	—	—	—	—	Hard Times and Nursery Rhymes
2011	"Gimme the Sweet and Lowdown"	—	—	—	—	—	Hard Times and Nursery Rhymes
2013	"Up Around the Bend"	—	—	—	—	—	Free Birds soundtrack
2026	"Born to Kill"	—	—	28	17	—	Born to Kill
2026	"Partners in Crime"	—	—	—	—	—	Born to Kill
2026	"The Way Things Were"	—	—	—	—	—	Born to Kill
2026	"Tonight"	—	35	31	31	—	Born to Kill
2026	"No Way Out"	—	—	—	—	—	Born to Kill
2026	"Walk Away (Don't Look Back)"	—	—	—	—	—	Born to Kill
"—" denotes a release that did not chart.

== Videography ==
=== Video albums ===
Year	Title	Certifications
2004	Live in Orange County: Released: July 27, 2004; Label: Time Bomb; Formats: VHS	US: Gold

=== Music videos ===
Year	Song	Director(s)
1990	"Ball and Chain"	Tony Vanden Ende
1990	"Story of My Life"	Tony Vanden Ende
1992	"Bad Luck"	Jonathan Dayton, Valerie Faris
1992	"Cold Feelings"	R. Ramirez
1993	"When She Begins"	Jim Guerinot
1996	"I Was Wrong"	Ken Fox
1997	"When the Angels Sing"	Nigel Dick
2011	"Machine Gun Blues"	Jeremy Alter
2012	"Gimme the Sweet and Lowdown"	The Mad Twins
2026	"Born to Kill"	Lance Bangs
2026	"Partners in Crime"	Mike Ness, Josh Roush
2026	"The Way Things Were"	Mike Ness, Josh Roush
2026	"Tonight"	John Swab
2026	"No Way Out"	Mike Ness, Josh Roush
2026	"Walk Away (Don't Look Back)"	Mike Ness, Josh Roush

== Notes ==
- A. "I Was Wrong" peaked at #54 on the US Radio Songs chart.
