= List of Social Distortion band members =

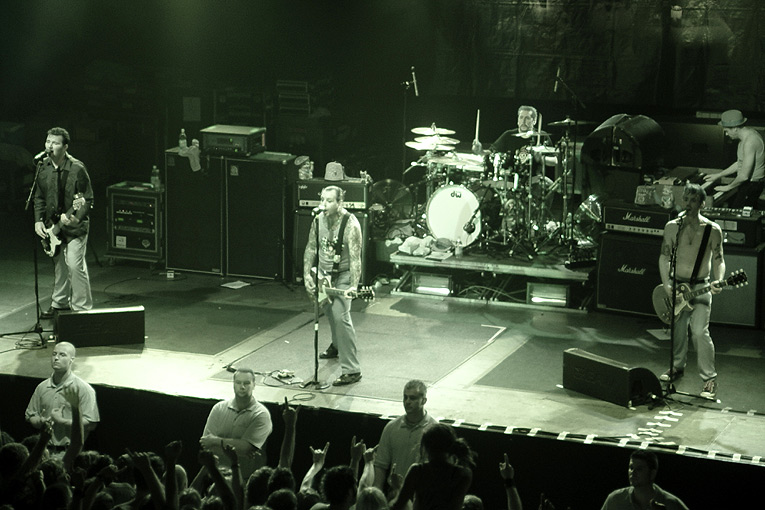
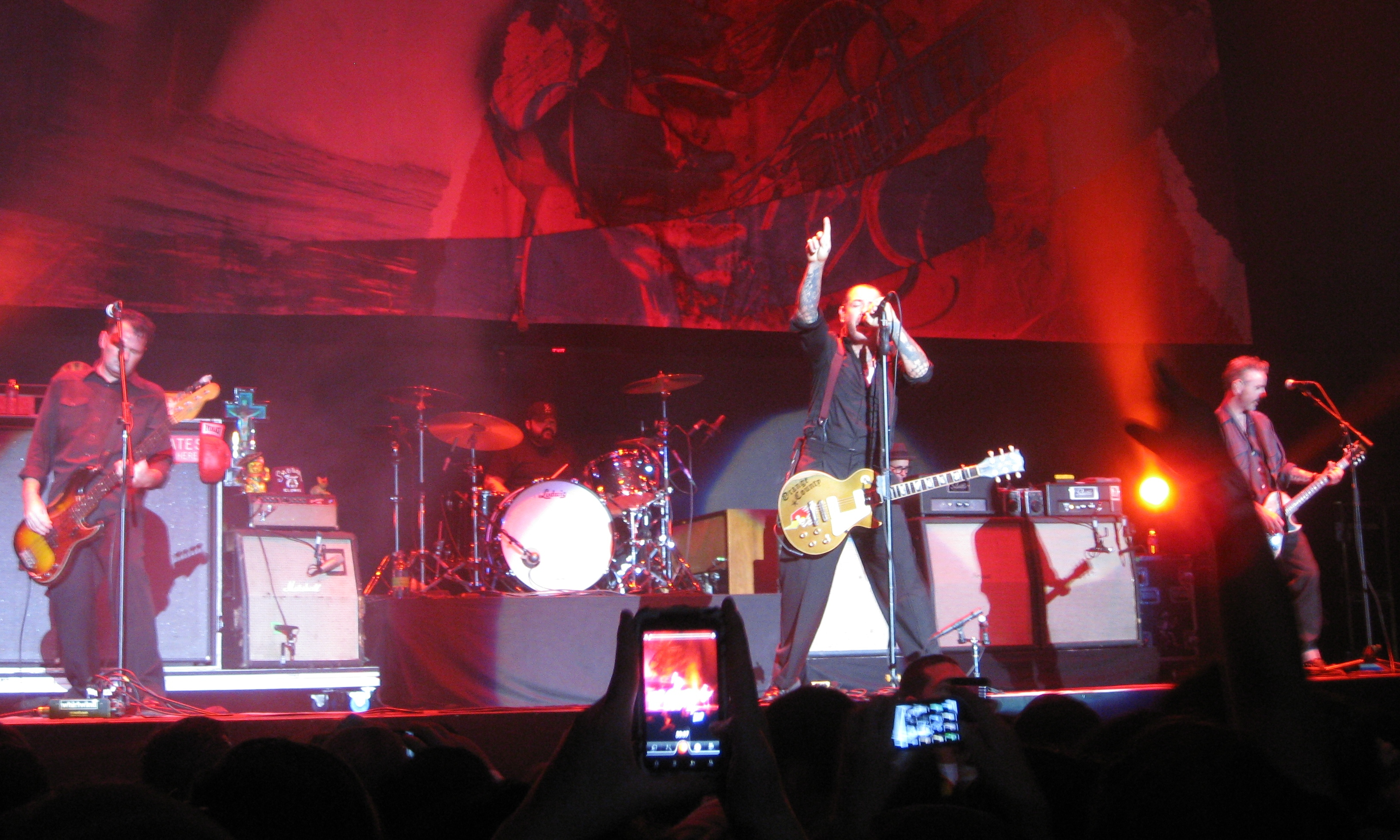
Two lineups of Social Distortion performing live in 2005 (top) and 2011 (bottom).

Social Distortion is an American punk rock band from Fullerton, California. The band has been through a number of lineup changes, and currently includes founding member Mike Ness on guitar and vocals, rhythm guitarist Jonny "2 Bags" Wickersham (since 2000), bassist Brent Harding (since 2005) and drummer David Hidalgo Jr. (since 2010).

== History ==
Social Distortion was formed in 1978 by guitarist Mike Ness, bassist Mark Garrett, drummer Casey Royer and vocalist Tom Corvin. Garrett was eventually replaced by Rikk Agnew later that year. After roughly a year in the band, Corvin left and Ness assumed vocal duties while Agnew and Royer also left to play in a separate band named Social Distortion, which also included Garrett, before joining the Adolescents, when Ness brought in Dennis Danell to take over on guitar. When Social Distortion released its first single, Mainliner/Playpen in 1981, the group consisted of Ness on vocals and guitar, Dannell on bass, and John "Carrot" Stevenson on drums. Partway through 1981, Danell switched to rhythm guitar as Brent Liles took over on bass, joining alongside new drummer Derek O'Brien. The group released its debut album Mommy's Little Monster in 1983. During a show on New Year's Eve, both Liles and O'Brien left abruptly in response to Ness' heroin use. Early the next year, the departed members were replaced by John Maurer (bass) and Christopher Reece (drums). Bob Stubbs briefly served as drummer before Reece.

The band's lineup remained stable for ten years, producing three studio albums, before Reece left in October 1994 on amicable terms. He was initially replaced by Randy Carr, who lasted only until the following spring when he was fired on the recommendation of the band's producer Michael Beinhorn. Session drummer Deen Castronovo performed on the album, after which Chuck Biscuits joined the band as Carr's replacement. The band released Live at the Roxy in 1998, before taking a hiatus the following year as Ness released two solo albums and embarked on a promotional tour. On February 29, 2000, Danell died of a brain aneurysm. In June, Social Distortion returned with a new lineup including rhythm guitarist Jonny "2 Bags" Wickersham and drummer Charlie Quintana.

Shortly after recording the band's sixth studio album Sex, Love and Rock 'n' Roll, Maurer left Social Distortion to spend more time with his family. He was initially replaced by Rancid's Matt Freeman, although by January he had been replaced by Brent Harding, who had previously performed with Ness on his second solo album. In April 2009, Quintana announced his departure from Social Distortion, with Adam "Atom" Willard of Angels & Airwaves taking his place. Willard left again in March 2010, with Fu Manchu drummer Scott Reeder filling in for a South American tour. The group enlisted the services of Josh Freese for the 2011 album Hard Times and Nursery Rhymes, before David Hidalgo Jr. joined as the full-time replacement for Willard a few months later.

== Members ==
=== Current ===
Image	Name	Years active	Instruments	Release contributions
	Mike Ness	1978–present	lead vocals; lead guitar	all Social Distortion releases
	Jonny "2 Bags" Wickersham	2000–present	rhythm guitar; backing vocals	all Social Distortion releases from Sex, Love and Rock 'n' Roll (2004) onwards
	Brent Harding	2005–present	bass; backing vocals	all Social Distortion releases from "Far Behind" (2007) onwards
	David Hidalgo Jr.	2010–present	drums; percussion	"Up Around the Bend" (2013); Machine Gun Melodies (2017); Born to Kill (2026)

=== Former ===
Image	Name	Years active	Instruments	Release contributions
	Casey Royer	1978–1979	drums; backing vocals	none
	Tom Corvin	1978–1979	vocals	none
	Mark Garrett	1978 (died; year of death unknown)	bass; backing vocals	none
	Rikk Agnew	1978–1979	bass; backing vocals	none
	Dennis Danell	1979–2000 (until his death)	rhythm guitar (1981–2000); bass (1979–1981)	all Social Distortion releases from "Mainliner/Playpen" (1981) to Live at the Roxy (1998)
	John "Carrot" Stevenson	1979–1981	drums	"Mainliner/Playpen" (1981); "1945" (1982); Mainliner: Wreckage from the Past (1995)
	Brent Liles	1981–1983 (died 2007)	bass	Mommy's Little Monster (1983); Mainliner: Wreckage from the Past (1995)
	Derek O'Brien	1981–1983	drums; backing vocals	Mommy's Little Monster (1983); Mainliner: Wreckage from the Past (1995)
	John Maurer	1984–2004	bass; backing vocals	all Social Distortion releases from Prison Bound (1988) to Live in Orange County (2004)
	Bob Stubbs	1984	drums	none
	Christopher Reece	1984–1994	drums	Prison Bound (1988); Social Distortion (1990); Somewhere Between Heaven and Hell (1992)
	Randy Carr	1994–1995 (died 2002)	drums	none
	Chuck Biscuits (real name Charles Montgomery)	1996–2000	drums	Live at the Roxy (1998)
	Charlie "Chalo" Quintana	2000–2009 (died 2018)	drums	all Social Distortion releases from Sex, Love and Rock 'n' Roll (2004) to "Far Behind" (2007)
	Matt Freeman	2004–2005	bass; backing vocals	none
	Adam "Atom" Willard	2009–2010	drums	none

=== Touring musicians ===
Image	Name	Years active	Instruments	Details
	Ron Emory	2006	lead guitar	Emory took over on lead guitar from Ness when the frontman broke his wrist in early 2006.
	Scott Reeder	2010	drums	Reeder filled in for a South American tour after the departure of Atom Willard in March 2010.
	David Kalish	2011–present	keyboards; Hammond organ	Kalish has toured with Social Distortion since 2011, performing keyboards and Hammond organ.

== Lineups ==
Period	Members	Releases
1978	Mike Ness – guitars, backing vocals; Casey Royer – drums, backing vocals; Tom Corvin – lead vocals; Mark Garrett – bass, backing vocals	none
Late 1978 – late 1979	Mike Ness – guitars, backing vocals; Casey Royer – drums, backing vocals; Tom Corvin - lead vocals; Rikk Agnew – bass, backing vocals	none
Late 1979 – summer 1981	Mike Ness – guitars, vocals; Dennis Danell – bass; John Carrot – drums	"Mainliner/Playpen" (1981); "1945" (1982)
Summer 1981 – December 1983	Mike Ness – lead guitar, lead vocals; Dennis Danell – rhythm guitar; Brent Liles – bass; Derek O'Brien – drums, backing vocals	Mommy's Little Monster (1983)
Early – mid-1984	Mike Ness – lead guitar, lead vocals; Dennis Danell – rhythm guitar; John Maurer – bass, backing vocals; Bob Stubbs – drums	none
Mid-1984 – October 1994	Mike Ness – lead guitar, lead vocals; Dennis Danell – rhythm guitar; John Maurer – bass, backing vocals; Christopher Reece – drums	Prison Bound (1988); Social Distortion (1990); Somewhere Between Heaven and Hell (1992)
Late 1994 – spring 1995	Mike Ness – lead guitar, lead vocals; Dennis Danell – rhythm guitar; John Maurer – bass, backing vocals; Randy Carr – drums	none
August 1995 – June 1996	Mike Ness – lead guitar, lead vocals; Dennis Danell – rhythm guitar; John Maurer – bass, backing vocals	White Light, White Heat, White Trash (1996)
July 1996 – February 2000	Mike Ness – lead guitar, lead vocals; Dennis Danell – rhythm guitar; John Maurer – bass, backing vocals; Chuck Biscuits – drums	Live at the Roxy (1998)
June 2000 – August 2004	Mike Ness – lead guitar, lead vocals; John Maurer – bass, backing vocals; Jonny Wickersham – rhythm guitar, backing vocals; Charlie Quintana – drums	Sex, Love and Rock 'n' Roll (2004); Live in Orange County (2004)
August 2004 – January 2005	Mike Ness – lead guitar, lead vocals; Jonny Wickersham – rhythm guitar, backing vocals; Charlie Quintana – drums; Matt Freeman – bass, backing vocals	none
January 2005 – April 2009	Mike Ness – lead guitar, lead vocals; Jonny Wickersham – rhythm guitar, backing vocals; Charlie Quintana – drums; Brent Harding – bass, backing vocals	"Far Behind" (2007)
April 2009 – March 2010	Mike Ness – lead guitar, lead vocals; Jonny Wickersham – rhythm guitar, backing vocals; Brent Harding – bass, backing vocals; Atom Willard – drums	none
March – July 2010	Mike Ness – lead guitar, lead vocals; Jonny Wickersham – rhythm guitar, backing vocals; Brent Harding – bass, backing vocals; Scott Reeder – drums (touring); Josh Freese – drums, percussion (session); Danny McGough - hammond (organ), piano	Hard Times and Nursery Rhymes (2011)
July 2010 – present	Mike Ness – lead guitar, lead vocals; Jonny Wickersham – rhythm guitar, backing vocals; Brent Harding – bass, backing vocals; David Hidalgo Jr. – drums, percussion	"Up Around the Bend" (2013); Machine Gun Melodies (2017); Born to Kill (album) (2026)
