= Greatest Hits (Social Distortion album) =

Compilation album by Social Distortion

Compilation album by Social Distortion
- Released: June 25, 2007
- Recorded: 1982–2007
- Genre: Punk rock
- Length: 47:01; 49:18 (iTunes version)
- Label: TimeBomb Recordings
- Producer: Various

Social Distortion chronology
Sex, Love and Rock 'n' Roll (2004)	Greatest Hits (2007)	Hard Times and Nursery Rhymes (2011)

Professional ratings
Review scores
Source	Rating
Allmusic	4/5 stars
Rocklouder	4/5 stars

Greatest Hits is a compilation album by Social Distortion. It was released on June 25, 2007. It includes hit singles from Mommy's Little Monster to Sex, Love and Rock 'n' Roll - as well as the unreleased track "Far Behind", which also became a hit single – yet lacks anything from Mainliner, which is actually a compilation of unreleased early material.

"Far Behind" is also the band's first new song recorded with then-current line-up of Mike Ness (vocals, guitars), Jonny "2 Bags" Wickersham (guitar), Brent Harding (bass guitar) and Charlie Quintana (drums).

The limited edition vinyl for this album contains an interview with Mike Ness.

A bonus track, a studio recording of a new Social Distortion cover version of the Chuck Berry classic "Maybellene", is available through the iTunes music store in the US. On the UK version, the bonus track is "1945" (13th Floor Records version), which was previously released as a single, as a B-side on the Story of My Life EP, and on Mainliner.

"Story of My Life" and a live version of "Mommy's Little Monster" appear in the music video games Guitar Hero III: Legends of Rock and Guitar Hero: Metallica, respectively. I Was Wrong appears in the music video game Rock Band 2, while "Story of My Life", "Bad Luck", and "Ring of Fire" were released as downloadable content for the series.

== Track listing ==
No.	Title	Writer(s)	Length
1.	"Another State of Mind" (from Mommy's Little Monster, 1983)	Social Distortion	2:38
2.	"Mommy's Little Monster" (from Mommy's Little Monster, 1983)		3:31
3.	"Prison Bound" (from Prison Bound, 1988)	Mike Ness	5:23
4.	"Story of My Life" (from Social Distortion, 1990)	Ness	5:46
5.	"Ball and Chain" (from Social Distortion, 1990)	Ness	5:42
6.	"Ring of Fire" (from Social Distortion, 1990)	Merle Kilgore, June Carter	3:52
7.	"Bad Luck" (from Somewhere Between Heaven and Hell, 1992)		4:22
8.	"When the Angels Sing" (from White Light, White Heat, White Trash, 1996)		4:16
9.	"I Was Wrong" (from White Light, White Heat, White Trash, 1996)	Ness	3:57
10.	"Reach for the Sky" (from Sex, Love and Rock 'n' Roll, 2004)		3:31
11.	"Far Behind" (Previously unreleased)	Ness	4:03
12.	"Maybellene" (Previously unreleased - streaming platforms only)	Chuck Berry	2:17

== Personnel ==
- Mike Ness - vocals, guitar
- Dennis Danell - guitar (tracks 1–3)
- Brent Liles - bass guitar (tracks 1–2)
- Derek O'Brien - drums (tracks 1–2)
- John Maurer - bass guitar (tracks 3, 10)
- Christopher Reece - drums (track 3)
- Jonny Wickersham - guitar (tracks 4–12)
- Charlie Quintana - drums (tracks 4–12)
- Brent Harding - bass guitar (tracks 4–9, 11–12)

== Charts ==
Chart (2007)	Peak position
US Billboard 200	86
US Independent Albums (Billboard)	1
US Top Tastemaker Albums (Billboard)	13
