= Live in Orange County =

Social Distortion: Live in Orange County
- Directed by: Kris Martinez
- Produced by: Joe Escalante
- Starring: Mike Ness; John Maurer; Jonny "2 Bags" Wickersham; Charlie Quintana
- Cinematography: Danny Berk; Kevin Chao; Robert Chapman; Joe Escalante; John Huck Finn; Alan Pineda; Jose Rendon; Glennon Stratton; Andy Waruszewski
- Edited by: David Brundage; Nate Weaver
- Music by: Social Distortion
- Release date: July 27, 2004
- Running time: 60 minutes
- Country: United States
- Language: English

Live in Orange County is a DVD that was recorded by Social Distortion at the House of Blues in Anaheim, California in January 2003.

== Track listing ==
- All songs by Mike Ness unless otherwise noted.
1. "Making Believe" (Work)
2. "1945"
3. "Sick Boy"
4. "Telling Them"
5. "Bad Luck"
6. "Footprints on My Ceiling"
7. "Don't Drag Me Down"
8. "I Wasn't Born To Follow"
9. "Another State of Mind"
10. "The Creeps" (Ness/Danell)
11. "Mommy's Little Monster"
12. "Mass Hysteria"
13. "99 to Life"
14. "Ring of Fire" (Carter/Kilgore)
15. "Story of My Life"

== Special features ==
- "Pre-Show Warm Up"

Social D performs "The Creeps" during a pre-show rehearsal.

- "Rollin' for 4-5-6"

Mike explains a game of dice called 4–5–6.

- "Outhouse Acoustics"

Mike, Jonny and John perform "Bad Luck" acoustically in a bathroom.

- "Interviews and Hi-Jinx"

Mike's youngest son steals the show while he is being interviewed.

- "The New School"

Mike introduces his "pride and joy" (his two sons) to the audience during a performance.

- "Cruzin' The '36"

Riding along with Mike and his chihuahua in his custom '36 Ford.

- "Photo Gallery"

Still photographs taken during the performance.

- "Nona Split"

The entire set shown from nine different camera angles at once (tiled on the screen).

== Personnel ==
Social Distortion

- Mike Ness - vocals, guitar
- John Maurer - bass
- Jonny "2 Bags" Wickersham - guitar
- Charlie Quintana - drums

Additional personnel

- Danny McGough - B3 organ

== Certifications ==
Region	Certification	Certified units/sales
United States (RIAA)	Gold	50,000^{^}
^{^} Shipments figures based on certification alone.
