= Live at the Roxy (Social Distortion album) =

Live album by Social Distortion
- Released: June 30, 1998
- Recorded: April 7–9, 1998
- Venue: Roxy Theatre, West Hollywood, California
- Genre: Punk rock
- Length: 76:38
- Label: Time Bomb
- Producer: Bobby Leigh, Mike Ness, James Saez

Social Distortion chronology
White Light, White Heat, White Trash (1996)	Live at the Roxy (1998)	Sex, Love and Rock 'n' Roll (2004)

Professional ratings
Review scores
Source	Rating
AllMusic	4/5 stars

Live at the Roxy is a live album by American punk rock band Social Distortion. It was released in 1998, on the independent label Time Bomb. It's the last Social Distortion release with founding rhythm guitarist Dennis Danell, who died in 2000. John Moore of New Noises referred to Live at the Roxy as one of the best live punk rock albums of all time.

== Track listing ==
All songs written by Mike Ness unless otherwise noted.

1. "Story of My Life" – 6:00
2. "Bad Luck" – 4:27
3. "Under My Thumb" (Jagger-Richards) – 2:51
4. "Prison Bound" – 6:36
5. "Mommy's Little Monster" – 4:05
6. "Mass Hysteria" – 3:23
7. "The Creeps" (Danell, Ness) – 3:03
8. "Another State of Mind" – 2:51
9. "Let it Be Me" – 4:29
10. "No Pain, No Gain" – 3:24
11. "Cold Feelings" – 3:54
12. "Telling Them" – 3:58
13. "I Was Wrong" – 4:01
14. "1945" – 3:00
15. "Don't Drag Me Down" – 4:56
16. "Ball and Chain" – 7:04
17. "Ring of Fire" (Cash, Kilgore) – 8:32
18. Untitled – 0:04

== Personnel ==
- Mike Ness - lead guitar, lead vocals
- Dennis Danell - rhythm guitar
- John Maurer - bass guitar, backing vocals
- Chuck Biscuits - drums

== Charts ==
Chart (1998)	Peak position
US Billboard 200	121
