= Let It Be Me (Social Distortion song) =

Single by Social Distortion

from the album Social Distortion
- Released: 1990
- Genre: Punk rock, alternative rock, cowpunk
- Length: 4:16
- Label: Epic
- Songwriter(s): Mike Ness
- Producer(s): Dave Jerden

Social Distortion singles chronology
"Prison Bound" (1988)	"Let It Be Me" (1990)	"Ball and Chain" (1990)

"Let It Be Me" is a song by American punk rock band Social Distortion from their 1990 self-titled album. Released as a single, it charted on the Billboard Modern Rock Tracks chart at No. 11, and was their first song to chart there. A live version appears on their Live at the Roxy live album.

== Track listing ==
1. "Let It Be Me"
2. "It's All Over Now"
3. "Pretty Thing"

== Personnel ==
- Mike Ness - lead vocals, lead guitar
- Dennis Danell - rhythm guitar
- John Maurer - bass guitar, backing vocals
- Christopher Reece - drums

== Charts ==
Chart (1990)	Peak position
US Alternative Airplay (Billboard)	11
