= The Mechanics =

American punk band

The Mechanics: Tim Racca, Sandy Hancock, Brett Alexander, Scott Hoogland and Dennis Catron standing in front of a Fullerton, California automobile repair garage.

The Mechanics (1977–1981) are considered to be the first punk band to come out of Fullerton, California.

The Mechanics were a fusion of two bands, the L.A. Brats (Scott, Dennis, Brett and Sandy, which also featured John Crawford, future Berlin bassist) and Head Over Heels' songwriter and guitarist, Tim Racca. Head Over Heels also featured Danny Furious (O'Brien: pre-Joan Jett) and Greg Westermark before they formed punk legends The Avengers.

Since there was no "punk metal" classification at the time, The Mechanics headlined bills with bands as diverse as Fear and The Runaways, and metal groups featuring future Mötley Crüe members Tommy Lee and Mick Mars, George Lynch of Dokken, Matt Sorum of Guns N' Roses, and Snow featuring Carlos Cavazo. Included among their fan base were Blackie Lawless, Jeff Dahl, and members of Van Halen.

They are now remembered mostly by Orange County musicians who watched them in their teens like Mike Ness, Dennis Danell, and Rikk Agnew. Though they released only one 45 rpm single during their existence, their songs turned up on other's records, namely The Adolescents ("Frustrated" from Balboa Fun Zone) and The Avengers (their Dangerhouse single "Car Crash" is a reworking of The Mechanics "Warm Hollywood Welcome"). A copy of the Mechanics' rare 45 (only 500 were pressed) sold in 2009 for $348.00 on EBay.

== Current whereabouts ==
- Tim Racca - Still residing in Fullerton, California. Has recorded three CDs as 16 Tons (with drummer Randy Carr) and Da Losers
- Scott Hoogland - Currently lives in Lake Elsinore and sings in Poop
- Dennis Catron - Art director, lives in Orange County with his wife and son
- Sandy Hancock - Played with China White, 22 Jacks, Joyride, The Adolescents, sessions with Joey Ramone, and is currently with the blues-based Mama Hagglin'. Resides in La Habra and collects vintage cars. Now plays drums with Agent Orang
- Tim Maag - Played with The Cramps (renamed 'Touch Hazard'), D.I., the Social Distortion band with Casey Royer on vocals, and The Swing Set with Alice Bag on vocals. Currently residing in Los Angeles
- Brett Alexander - Music writer and artist. Now based in Austin, Texas
- Mike Couden - Proud Dad, still playing the upside-down Explorer bass, lives in Orange
- Eric Overman - Artist, high end audio designer and construction consultant, Currently residing in Long Beach with his wife and sons
- Andrew Epstein (co-manager) TV Producer, still resides in SoCal, married, son at UC Santa Cruz
- Robert Jones (co-manager) Living in the wilds of the Pacific Northwest, married, daughter in college

== Quotations ==
- "There was this band called The Mechanics from Fullerton who never did anything cause they were so far ahead of their time. I think probably out of all the bands, they influenced me the most." — Mike Ness, Social Distortion
- "The Mechanics. Hard-rocking, Iggy-esque 1970s godfathers to the whole Fullerton punk scene. They inspired the wee lads who became Social D and Agent Orange, and introduced the harmonized octave guitar sound that The Adolescents emulated on their blue album." — Mike Boehm, L.A. Times
- "The Adolescents' trademark soaring, massed-guitar sound--later appropriated by the Offspring, Guttermouth and many others--"was a Tim Racca trip that we borrowed and made huge, and everyone's done it since." — Frank Agnew, The Adolescents
- "I remember Dennis [Catron] doing a slide solo, using a big wrench. Tim Racca had such great attention to tone and played jackhammer rhythms. They were like a cross between AC/DC and Generation X, with a little Iggy Pop thrown in." — Mike Palm, Agent Orange (band)
- "No Brakes / Drivin' Me Away 7 inch Chateau East, 1981 PS. Hard rock punk crossovers from late 1970s Fullerton. Guitarist Tim's rhythm style would be copped by fellow locals the Adolescents, whom The Mechanics heavily influenced." — Brian, Grand Theft Audio
