= Brent Liles =

American bassist (1963–2007)

- Born: Brent Harold Liles; September 7, 1963
- Died: January 18, 2007 (aged 43)
- Genres: Punk rock, surf rock
- Occupation(s): Musician, bassist
- Instrument(s): Bass guitar, guitar, vocals
- Formerly of: Social Distortion, Agent Orange

Brent Harold Liles (September 7, 1963 – January 18, 2007) was an American musician who was the bassist for Social Distortion from 1981–1984 and later was the bassist for Agent Orange from 1988 – 1992.

== Career ==
He appeared on Social Distortion's 1983 classic debut Mommy's Little Monster before leaving the band on New Year's Day 1984, with the band's drummer Derek O'Brien. The two would once again be bandmates from 1989 to the early 1990s with Agent Orange. The Palm/Liles/O'Brien lineup of Agent Orange can be heard on the album Real Live Sound. It was Liles who originally came up with the idea of Agent Orange recording their little-known and never released album, Living in Total Darkness. This was a re-recording of the songs on their 1981 album Living in Darkness with some newer material mixed in. This recording was made on Christmas of 1988, which is somewhat interesting because Mommy's Little Monster was coincidentally recorded on Christmas Eve of 1982. Liles also briefly played guitar for the band Easter and Chaotic Stature. Brent also played bass for a band in 1984 to 1986 called The Harlots, who were managed by Monk Rock, Brent's manager from his Social Distortion days. The Harlots put out a 12 E.P. around March 1985 which was entitled Roger Roomper's Really Catchy Tunes.

He also appeared in the 1984 documentary Another State of Mind. His songwriting credits include "Mass Hysteria" with Social Distortion and "Broken Dreams" with Agent Orange. during his time with Social Distortion, he was known for playing a Rickenbacker 4001 bass as his primary instrument.

Liles had been out of the musical scene since the mid-1990s, operating a convalescent home in Placentia, California. He died on January 18, 2007 after being hit by a truck while cycling. A Social Distortion benefit concert was held for his family at the Galaxy Theater in Santa Ana, California on March 8, 2007. He is survived by his mother Carol Liles and daughter Maddie Liles.

Liles was the fourth member of Social Distortion to die. Other deceased Social Distortion members include Dennis Danell in 2000 (brain aneurysm), Randy Carr in 2002 (Cushing's Syndrome), and original bassist Mark Garrett (unknown cause). Additionally, former producer and organist on Mommy's Little Monster Chaz Ramirez died in 1993 after sustaining a broken neck and head injuries in a warehouse fall. With the 2018 death of Charlie Quintana, five members of Social Distortion have died.

== Discography ==
=== With Social Distortion ===
- Mainliner: Wreckage from the Past (bass, backing vocals)
- Mommy's Little Monster bass

=== With Agent Orange ===
- Real Live Sound (bass)

=== With The Harlots ===
- Roger Roomper's Really Catchy Tunes (bass)
