= White Light, White Heat, White Trash =

Studio album by Social Distortion
- Released: September 17, 1996
- Recorded: August 1995 – June 1996
- Studios: Bearsville Studio, Woodstock, New York
- Genre: Punk rock
- Length: 46:33
- Labels: 550; Epic
- Producer: Michael Beinhorn

Social Distortion chronology
Mainliner: Wreckage From the Past (1995)	White Light, White Heat, White Trash (1996)	Live at the Roxy (1998)

Singles from White Light, White Heat, White Trash
- 1. "I Was Wrong" Released: November 11, 1996; 2. "When the Angels Sing" Released: 1996; 3. "Don't Drag Me Down" Released: 1997

White Light, White Heat, White Trash is the fifth studio album by American punk rock band Social Distortion, released on September 17, 1996, by 550 Music and Epic Records. The album was produced by Michael Beinhorn. After the release of Somewhere Between Heaven and Hell, the band toured until the end of 1993 and needed a break. After dealing with court battles over early recordings and attempting to retrieve them, package them up, and release them, Social Distortion wrote songs for a new album.

Guitarist and singer Mike Ness was disappointed with the way music was during the 1990s, including punk rock and rock music in general. He wanted to make a new album that would be considered Social Distortion's best, and bring back the characteristics and emotions of 1970s punk rock. White Light, White Heat, White Trash includes fewer rock and roll, country and blues influences than the band's previous three albums, and instead returns to their 1980s pure punk era, for example Mommy's Little Monster. The album has more introspective and personal lyrics about topics like grief, regret, looking back to the past, and making changes or improvements in one's life, inspired by Ness' past, which involved drugs, alcohol, and jail.

Reviews for White Light, White Heat, White Trash were mixed-to-positive, with the musical style and lyrical content being praised by some critics and criticized by others. The album experienced moderate success and peaked at number 27 on the Billboard 200, selling 277,000 copies in the United States as of December 31, 1998, according to Nielsen SoundScan, making it Social Distortion's third best-selling album. The two singles, "I Was Wrong" and "When the Angels Sing". The former experienced chart success on the Billboard charts, playing frequently on rock radio and MTV. The latter was less successful. Social Distortion planned to tour both inside and outside the United States, also performing at Warped Tour 1997 along with bands like Lagwagon, Less Than Jake, and the Mighty Mighty Bosstones.

== Background, writing, and recording ==
After the release of Somewhere Between Heaven and Hell in 1992, Social Distortion went touring and they toured until the end of 1993. The band's guitarist and singer Mike Ness said the band "needed a break." Social Distortion then had to be involved in some court battles to retrieve some of the band's early recordings. The recording were not in the band's possession and the recordings were unavailable to the public, too. The band "had to retrieve them, package them up and put them out." Social Distortion wrote 25 songs for a new album because the band wanted to write an album "that would stand out", according to Ness. "We wanted to make 'The Record'," he explained. He claims there's a few songs on each Social Distortion album that he hated "because we just did 'em, and settled for it and didn't challenge it."

Social Distortion wrote a dozen songs in 1994 for a new album, but were told by producer Michael Beinhorn that most of the songs would not work. Ness says: "He saw something inside that needed to come out, and we weren't quite achieving it. We went back in and did more writing. We ended up keeping two of those twelve songs." Initially, Ness was upset but the two "gained a mutual respect for each other." Ness decided the two "were on the right track" and saw the situation as an exciting challenge. The title to White Light, White Heat, White Trash was a reference to the 1949 film White Heat and the Velvet Underground album White Light/White Heat. When recording started in the late spring of 1995, Beinhorn decided that drummer Randy Carr was not providing the studio sound Beinhorn sought. Ness trusted the producer enough to agree to the decision. A session player, Deen Castronovo, participated in the recording. After he participated, he stopped playing for Social Distortion and drummer Chuck Biscuits, former drummer for bands like Black Flag, Danzig, D.O.A. and the Circle Jerks, joined Social Distortion. The album was recorded from August 1995 to June 1996 in Bearsville Studio in Woodstock, New York. "Going back to basics" was considered the philosophy that underlay the recording process of White Light, White Heat, White Trash. As a result, Beinhorn solely used analog and vintage equipment in the studio. Ness claimed that during the cutting of the guitar tracks, he used a '68 Gold Top reissue with P-90 pickups, a few SG reissues and a Silvertone through various Fenders, Marshalls and Soldanos. Ness said: "Me and [Social Distortion guitarist] Dennis Danell really wanted to get an in-your-face sound," said Ness. "Something with a bottom end that would hit you right in the chest." Ness claims that Social Distortion "used all analog equipment until the very last moment", which he considered similar to 1970s rock.

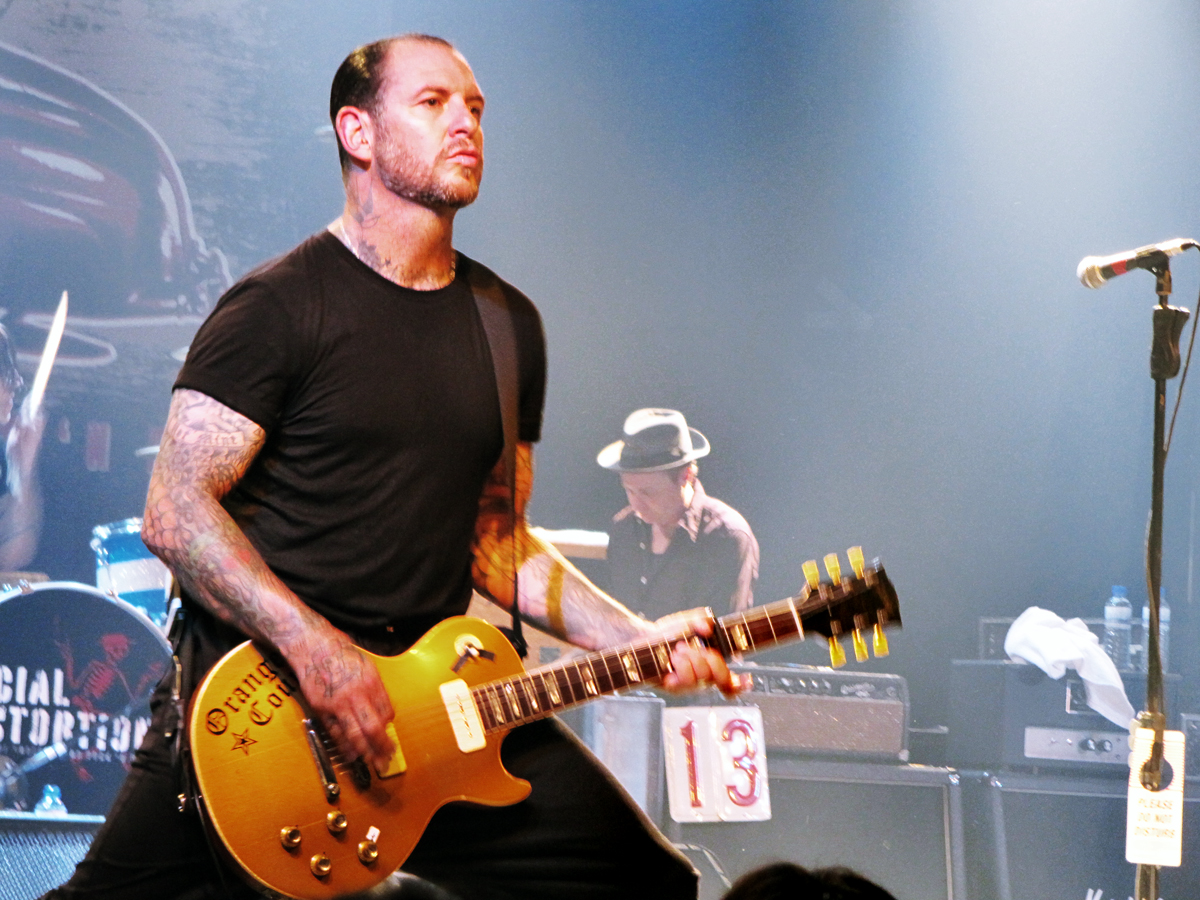
Ness (pictured) believed in the 1990s that "alternative music has become so marketable that a lot of it has become imagery."

Ness was disappointed with the state of music that existed during the 1990s. When he wrote White Light, White Heat, White Trash, he was "reacting against" 1990s music. Rejecting grunge, Ness was inspired by the style of 1970s punk bands like The Clash, the New York Dolls, Generation X, the Dead Boys, and Johnny Thunders. Ness said he "don't like hardly anybody" who was making music during the 1990s. He then said: "I don't want to listen to this stuff. I want to listen to the real thing. It's very hard for me to get inspired by contemporary music." Ness said that 1970s punk rock "was also the only music at the time accurately portraying how I felt inside." Expressing his opinion of the way music was during the 1990s, Ness said: "Our intention is to bring back the soul and emotion of that first wave of punk in the late '70s, which I feel is sorely lacking today". He then said: "Punk has become a formula now. It's basically Cheap Trick with louder guitars," he said. "A lot of passion has been lost as it's become more marketable. The masses have decided that punk rock is safe, but we were doing this music when it was unpopular." Ness believed that punk rock was no longer countercultural or dangerous in the 1990s. "Punk was more dangerous back then," he recalls. "In Orange County in 1979, if you walked down the street in a leather jacket and spiked hair, you made a decision that you would have a confrontation that day." Ness said "there's just things going on today that just would never have been allowed" in the early years of punk rock, and he said that heavy metal, for example, was hated by punk rock musicians and fans during punk rock's early years. He then criticized grunge bands like Alice in Chains and Stone Temple Pilots, describing them as "just Led Zeppelin with a pierced nose and short hair." Ness made an exception for grunge band Nirvana, saying he "believed them".

Social Distortion wanted to go back to its late 1970s and early 1980s punk rock roots with White Light, White Heat, White Trash. Ness said "I don't want this to be just another Social D record. I want it to be the Social D record." Ness said: "The last thing I wanted to write was a cute alternative record," he says. "This album is about going back to the genuine emotion and rock basics that fueled the first wave of punk." Social Distortion's 1983 debut studio album Mommy's Little Monster was inspired by bands like the Ramones, the Rolling Stones, and X. Ness considered White Light, White Heat, White Trash to be a "regression back to" Mommy's Little Monster and believes the album shows Social Distortion going back to the band's roots, but still considers the album an evolution because Ness "had to dig really deep", citing songs like "I Was Wrong" and "When the Angels Sing" as examples of this. He says those two songs "deal with sin and redemption, inner conflict, good and bad."

== Artistry ==
=== Musical style ===
White Light, White Heat, White Trash shows the band taking a break from the rock and roll and country-inspired style of previous Social Distortion albums by instead featuring a pure punk rock style. In Music We Trust described both the album and Social Distortion's music as a whole as street punk. Describing White Light, White Heat, White Trash as "heavy hard rock", Stephen Thomas Erlewine of AllMusic wrote that Social Distortion "made a conscious attempt to cash in on the alternative 'revolution' of the early '90s." Nonetheless, Dan McGarry of The Yale Herald wrote: "If Ness wanted this record to demonstrate that unique quality that puts Social Distortion above and beyond current "alternative" music, he has succeeded." Marci Von Savoy of The Daily Universe wrote: "The album is reminiscent of the primary punk bands influences: The Ramones, The Clash and the late '70s and early '80s punk sound. The album veers far from the alternative trend, which seems to sneak its way into newer punk rock." iTunes described White Light, White Heat, White Trash's musical style as a musical style resembling hardcore punk and classic punk rock, writing that "Social Distortion returned to its hardcore roots". Ness said of the album's musical style: "What's really ironic about this record is that it probably has more similarities to our first album, from 1983, than any of them. And that was purely unconscious. A lot of those emotions resurfaced. Or I just got in touch with them. I don't think they ever go away." Ness believes White Light, White Heat, White Trash was featuring both Social Distortion moving forward and reverting to the band's roots. White Light, White Heat, White Trash features a hidden track and the hidden track is a cover of the Rolling Stones song "Under My Thumb". Ness said:

"We had recorded that song so long ago and I just wanted to re-record it and do it like we were playing it so well. We had evolved as a band so much, I felt like I wanted to revisit it, re-record it and just throw it in there. [Some] songs that mean a lot to me, I've already been listening to them for so long and I just one day go, 'I'm going to start playing this.' Me and the band work it out. I want to show everyone how it influenced me so it becomes my own version of that."

=== Lyrical themes ===
"I was 10 years into my recovery from drugs and alcohol and certain things were becoming clear to me, like maybe drugs and alcohol were just a small part of the problem. It was just the beginning of a little self-awareness. I didn't like what I was seeing....It was a lot of the evaluating things."

— Ness on the lyrical inspiration for White Light, White Heat, White Trash.

The lyrics on White Light, White Heat, White Trash are more personal than the lyrics on previous Social Distortion albums. Although a couple of songs are more political or about social issues, the lyrical content on the album is instead personal or introspective. The lyrics often deal with looking back at the past and making changes or improvements in one's life. Ness' struggles in life with drugs, alcohol, and jail inspired the lyrics of the album. Ness says "Dear Lover", despite the song title, was not necessarily written after a heartbreak. "I already felt like that. I didn't even need to get my heart broke to feel that way. What I was doing wasn't working. It was almost like saying goodbye to that life because it really wasn't bringing me happiness. It's something everyone goes through and I kind of wanted to paint a picture, an accurate picture, of that." "Don't Drag Me Down" is about racism and how Ness witnessed it when touring in the United States and seeing it at punk rock concerts, leading to him engaging in physical fights. "Untitled" is about Ness becoming sober, and a few older men helped him with it. One of them was a very close friend of his, but that friend died. Ness lost four other friends, and all of this inspired "Untitled". "I Was Wrong" is about admitting to mistakes or engaging in morally wrong behavior. Ness explains: "I don't know this for sure, but I may have been one of the first rock 'n' rollers to just say, 'at certain times in my life I was an asshole.' This job comes a big ego, 'Hey man, I am who I am. Take it, that's just what I do. I'm Mike Ness. Take it or leave it.' It's so easy to pull that card, but it's a lot harder to look inward and just go, 'You know what? You're right. I was wrong.' " "Down on the World Again" is "about having the worst day", according to Ness. He says it is inspired by his painful childhood and how it made him an angry person. He considers it useful to use that anger for songwriting, but considers it unhealthy to use anger in one's daily life. He says: "I was fighting the world, but I didn't even really have a reason." "When the Angels Sing" is about the death of Ness' grandmother and how being single intensified the grief. Ness' grandmother died in December 1993. Ness said about "When the Angels Sing": "My feelings came out more in that song than what I felt in the actual funeral." "Gotta Know the Rules" is about rules and laws in life and the consequences of disobeying them. Ness elaborated:

"Like, how you treat people. I was just learning about the melody at that point in my life and how important that is, and vulnerability. A lot of people just aren't in touch with this kind of stuff. Their job and their car and their career define them and they run on that, especially if they're in a business that's competitive or something. It's cutthroat, and you don't take time to look at this kind of stuff. Our egos are so powerful, but I feel like the ego is the one thing that humans could do without."

"Crown of Thorns" is about repeating the same mistakes in life, expecting different results. Ness elaborated: "I knew I wasn't going to find love where I was looking. At some point there's an aspect of self care that has to come into play, otherwise it's never going to change." "Pleasure Seeker" is about struggling to make a decision because what feels good may be considered morally wrong. "Down Here With the Rest of Us" is about the level playing field. Ness said: "It's a level playing field no matter who you are. We're still going to go through pain in life. I think it was kind of a snub at people who think they're above that. It's like no, we're all in this mess together, bro. No one gets out alive."

== Release ==
Released on September 17, 1996, White Light, White Heat, White Trash peaked at number 27 on the Billboard 200, selling 30,000 copies in its first week of release in the United States. The album sold steady weekly sales of 10,000 to 12,000 copies. According to Nielsen SoundScan, as of December 31, 1998, White Light, White Heat, White Trash has sold 277,000 copies in the United States, making it Social Distortion's third best-selling album. Ness was confident that the album would have more success than the band's self-titled album (1990) and Somewhere Between Heaven and Hell (1992), given that the two previous albums were released before 1994, the year punk rock became mainstream, and given that many more radio stations in the mid-1990s began frequently playing the genre. Social Distortion planned to tour both inside and outside the United States, given that the band began to attract people outside the United States. They performed at Warped Tour 1997 along with other bands like Blink-182, the Mighty Mighty Bosstones, Sick of It All, Descendents, Pennywise, the Suicide Machines, Lagwagon, Less Than Jake, Reel Big Fish, and Limp Bizkit.

The song "I Was Wrong" was released to radio and received a music video. The song was successful on rock radio and MTV. It peaked at number 54 on the Hot 100 Airplay chart and remained on the chart for 13 weeks. On the Modern Rock Tracks chart, the song peaked at number 4 and remaining on the chart for 22 weeks. It also peaked at number 12 on the Mainstream Rock Tracks chart, remaining there for 19 weeks. "When the Angels Sing" also had a music video and was released to radio. The song, however, did not have much success on rock radio and peaked at relatively low positions on the Billboard charts.

== Critical reception ==
Professional ratings
Review scores
Source	Rating
AllMusic	2.5/5 stars
Chicago Tribune	3/4 stars
Entertainment Weekly	A−
Rolling Stone	3.5/5 stars
The Rolling Stone Album Guide	5/5 stars
Spin	4/10
The Chanticleer	4/5

Reviews and ratings for White Light, White Heat, White Trash were generally mixed to positive. AllMusic's Stephen Thomas Erlewine, however, called the album a "conscious attempt to cash in on the alternative 'revolution" of the early '90s" and expressed mixed feelings towards the band's musical direction, stating, "Underneath the layers of glossy hard rock production, the band still hold fast to some of their punk roots, but too often they sound like a heavy hard rock band. Of course, that commercial sheen is intentional – it's the only way they could appeal to the legions of post-grunge alternative fans who appeared since Social Distortion released Somewhere Between Heaven and Hell in 1992." Chris Moran of Punknews.org praised the album and wrote: "with its passionate lyrics, laced with heavy undertones; this is unquestionable a milestone in the legacy of Social Distortion." Tom Sinclair of Entertainment Weekly wrote: "After more than a decade of hard playing and harder living, Southern California's Social Distortion have made their first truly transcendent album." Roberto Gonzalez of the Hartford Courant wrote: "The album is exhausting. Almost every song kicks with an amazing intensity that will have you immediately hooked." Ira Robbins of Rolling Stone wrote: "the band's musical and emotional values are timeless. Like a fist in the face, White Light White Heat White Trash is simple and effective." Chuck Eddy of Spin gave White Light, White Heat, White Trash a mixed to negative review and wrote: Ness's newfound nasal-flattened attempts at balladic sensitivity are embarrassing". Sam Dillon of The Chanticleer praised the album and wrote: "You just can't go wrong with Social D. they've got everything you could ask for in a punk-rock band. They are inventive, individual, and very talented. Go out right now and get this album." Jon Pareles of The New York Times criticized White Light, White Heat, White Trash's lyrics, claiming it had a lot of clichés, but praised the album's melodies.

White Light, White Heat, White Trash was ranked at number 41 on Kerrang!'s "50 Greatest Punk Albums Ever". Some Social Distortion fans were upset when the lead single, "I Was Wrong," was played on rock radio because they believed punk rock should not be corporate or mainstream. Nonetheless, most fans eventually moved on from this in the early 2000s. Social Distortion continued to be regarded as an important band by punk rock fans, who continued to support them. White Light, White Heat, White Trash was included in lists of the best albums of 1996 by The Buffalo News and other publications.

== Track listing ==
All tracks are written by Mike Ness, except where noted.

White Light, White Heat, White Trash track listing
No.	Title	Length
1.	"Dear Lover"	4:43
2.	"Don't Drag Me Down"	3:51
3.	"Untitled"	4:45
4.	"I Was Wrong"	3:58
5.	"Through These Eyes"	3:15
6.	"Down on the World Again"	3:22
7.	"When the Angels Sing"	4:15
8.	"Gotta Know the Rules"	3:28
9.	"Crown of Thorns"	4:15
10.	"Pleasure Seeker"	3:33
11.	"Down Here (With the Rest of Us)"	4:19
Total length:		43:34

Hidden track
No.	Title	Writer(s)	Length
12.	"Under My Thumb" (The Rolling Stones cover)	Jagger–Richards	2:49
Total length:			46:33

== Personnel ==
Adapted from White Light, White Heat, White Trash's liner notes.

Social Distortion

- Mike Ness – vocals, guitars, art direction, mixing
- Dennis Danell – guitars
- John Maurer – bass guitar
- Deen Castronovo – drums (uncredited session drummer)
- Chuck Biscuits – drums (credited as band member at the time of release, did not play on the album)

Additional

- Michael Beinhorn – producer
- Kalynn Campbell – illustrations
- Jolie Clemens – art direction
- Giulio Costanzo – art direction
- George Marino – mastering
- John Travis – engineer, mixing

== Charts ==
Chart (1996)	Peak position
Canada Top Albums/CDs (RPM)	67
UK Rock & Metal Albums (Official Charts)	28
US Billboard 200	27

Chart (2021)	Peak position
German Albums (Offizielle Top 100)	77

== Accolades ==
Publication	Country	Accolade	Year	Rank
Blender	USA	500 CDs You Must Own Before You Die	2003	*
Rock Hard	Germany	Top 300 Albums	2001	123
Rolling Stone	Germany	The 500 Best Albums of All Time	2004	170
Visions	Germany	The Most Important Albums of the 90s	1999	31
Kerrang!	United Kingdom	50 Greatest Punk Albums Ever	N/A	41

(*) designates unordered lists.
