= Making Believe =

Song written by Jimmy Work

"Making Believe" is a country music song written by Jimmy Work. Kitty Wells recorded a chart-topping version in 1955. The song is on many lists of all-time greatest country music songs and has been covered by scores of artists over the past 50 years, including Thorleifs, Bob Dylan, Johnny Cash, Don Gibson, Roy Acuff, Lefty Frizzell, Wanda Jackson, Connie Francis, Ray Charles, Anita Carter, Dolly Parton, Emmylou Harris, Merle Haggard, the Kendalls, Ernest Tubb, Skeeter Davis, the Haden Triplets, Social Distortion, and Volbeat.

Singer-songwriter Work released the song as a single in February 1955 on Dot Records, and it reached number five on Billboard's country music jukebox charts. A month later, singer Kitty Wells released the song as a single, which hit number two on the country charts and remained there for 15 weeks, still a record for a song in the runner-up position on the country Billboard charts. The song was blocked from number one by the 21-week-long stay by "In the Jailhouse Now" by Webb Pierce.

The song is a melancholy ballad about not getting over a former lover. The singer daydreams that she (Wells version) is still loved by the old flame, even while fully knowing "you'll never be mine" again.

The song received new attention with three single releases in 1977-78, the Kendalls hitting number 80 with the song, their first release on Ovation Records. A few months later, Emmylou Harris climbed to number seven with her version. The following January, Merle Haggard and the Strangers received considerable airplay for their version, which was the B side of their single "Running Kind". Billy Joe Royal also released a cover version of the song.

Loretta Lynn and Conway Twitty released a duet version of the song in 1988 and used it as the title track for their final album together. Although the song was not a radio hit for them, it was a popular number at their concerts, and the album sold fairly well via television ads.

Ray Charles released this song on the album Modern Sounds in Country and Western Music Volume Two in 1962.

Punk rock group Social Distortion released this song on the album Somewhere Between Heaven and Hell in 1992, and they also included the song on the DVD Live in Orange County released in 2003.

Metal band Volbeat also released this song on the album Guitar Gangsters & Cadillac Blood in 2008.

== Personnel for the Merle Haggard version ==
- Merle Haggard– vocals, guitar

The Strangers:

- Roy Nichols – lead guitar
- Norman Hamlet – steel guitar, dobro
- Tiny Moore – mandolin
- Ronnie Reno – guitar
- Mark Yeary – piano
- James Tittle – bass
- Biff Adam – drums
- Don Markham – saxophone

== Chart performance ==
=== Jimmy Work ===
Chart (1955)	Peak position
US Hot Country Songs (Billboard)	5

=== Kitty Wells ===
Chart (1955)	Peak position
US Hot Country Songs (Billboard)	2

=== The Kendalls ===
Chart (1977)	Peak position
US Hot Country Songs (Billboard)	80

=== Emmylou Harris ===
Chart (1977)	Peak position
US Hot Country Songs (Billboard)	8
Canada Country Singles (RPM)	1
Canada Top Singles (RPM)	87
