= Sex, Love and Rock 'n' Roll =

Studio album by Social Distortion
- Released: September 27, 2004
- Recorded: 2000–2004
- Genre: Punk rock; cowpunk
- Length: 37:43
- Label: Time Bomb
- Producer: Social Distortion; Cameron Webb

Social Distortion chronology
Live at the Roxy (1998)	Sex, Love and Rock 'n' Roll (2004)	Greatest Hits (2007)

Singles from Sex, Love and Rock 'n' Roll
- 1. "Highway 101" Released: 2004; 2. "Reach for the Sky" Released: August 31, 2004; 3. "Don't Take Me for Granted" Released: 2005

Sex, Love and Rock 'n' Roll is the sixth studio album by American punk rock band Social Distortion. It is their first album in eight years, since the release of White Light, White Heat, White Trash in 1996. It was originally scheduled for release in the fall of 2000, but was not completed, not being released until September 28, 2004. This album is Social Distortion's first to feature guitarist Jonny Wickersham, following the death of Dennis Danell in February 2000. The opening track, "Reach for the Sky", was released as a single in late 2004, becoming one of the band's biggest hits.

Social Distortion was unable to make a follow-up to White Light, White Heat, White Trash due to various activities, most obviously those of frontman Mike Ness's solo career, releasing two solo albums in 1999, one with original material, Cheating at Solitaire, and one cover album, Under the Influences. Touring for these projects, and matters pertaining to Danell's death, set the album back a number of years, before finally being completed in 2004.

== History ==
Ness began writing new material for a sixth Social Distortion album during the White Light, White Heat, White Trash tour in 1997. One of the new songs, "I Won't Run No More", was first performed at a concert in Germany that year. Ness launched a solo career in 1998, and decided to record some of the songs for his first album, Cheating at Solitaire.

In November 1999, Ness added more details to the possibility of a new album and mentioned he'd "like to get one out" in fall 2000. In May 2001, a questioner asked Ness how it was coming along. He replied, "Slow." His wife elaborated that he was in "home mode", working on restoring a house in Santa Ana, CA. The band was rumored to resume recording in June or July.

In July 2001, five songs that were going to appear on the album were announced. The songs were "Road Zombie", "Winners and Losers", "I Wasn't Born to Follow", "Don't Take Me for Granted" and "Footprints on My Ceiling". "Don't Take Me for Granted" was the only known unreleased song that the band played at the When the Angels Sing benefit concert in 2000. In July 2001, in a Los Angeles Times article, Ness discussed the possibility of releasing the album in spring 2002 and mentioned an invitation from Johnny Cash to record together.

In January 2002, an inside source reported that Social Distortion was planning to begin recording the album in March and began recording demos for the album in October, with an intended release date of spring 2003. In October 2003, the band announced on their official website that they were planning to enter a studio in Los Angeles, California, in November to finish work on the album. During a January 11, 2004, concert in Orlando, Florida, Ness revealed that the album was "three-quarters of the way completed" and mixing began in June.

A January 2003 issue of a German magazine Visions conducted an interview with Ness. About the album, he says: "Definitely more glam and seventies influences and less country since I'm able to realize this part of me better by the Mike Ness Band. And certainly more hope and light than on White Light, White Heat, White Trash. You can't forever tell yourself and others that life's all bad. Apart from other things, punk rock also is about fun and loud guitars. Before doing the last album I went through a really hard time, and even if not all is great in my life, I'm much better now than at that time."

On August 5, 2004, Social Distortion announced on their official website that the album would be called Sex, Love and Rock 'n' Roll and would officially be released on September 28. On the same day, it was announced that bass guitarist John Maurer, who recorded the album, had left the band "in order to stay home and devote time to his wife and two children". On tour, Rancid's Matt Freeman joined as his replacement, then was himself replaced a few months later by Ness' touring bass guitarist for his solo project, Brent Harding.

== Reception ==
Professional ratings
Review scores
Source	Rating
Allmusic	4.0/5 stars
Punknews.org	4.5/5 stars
Rock Hard	9.5/10

Critical reviews of Sex, Love and Rock 'n' Roll were mostly positive. AllMusic's Mark Deming gave the album a rating of four stars out of five and states: "Sex, Love and Rock 'n' Roll shows that Social Distortion have held onto what made them great while growing and changing in the best ways, and the result is one of the best albums this band has made to date." In 2005, the album was ranked number 456 in Rock Hard magazine's book The 500 Greatest Rock & Metal Albums of All Time.

== Track listing ==
All songs written by Mike Ness unless otherwise noted.

Sex, Love and Rock 'n' Roll track listing
No.	Title	Writer(s)	Length
1.	"Reach for the Sky"		3:31
2.	"Highway 101"		3:44
3.	"Don't Take Me for Granted"		3:47
4.	"Footprints on My Ceiling"		5:08
5.	"Nickels and Dimes"	Mike Ness, Jonny Wickersham	3:05
6.	"I Wasn't Born to Follow"		2:55
7.	"Winners and Losers"		4:45
8.	"Faithless"	Ness, Wickersham	3:02
9.	"Live Before You Die"		2:47
10.	"Angel's Wings"	Ness, Wickersham	4:59
11.	"Mommy's Little Monster" (only in the European edition, from Live in Orange County DVD)		3:29
Total length:			37:43

== Personnel ==
- Mike Ness – lead vocals, lead guitar
- Jonny Wickersham – rhythm guitar
- John Maurer – bass guitar, backing vocals
- Charlie Quintana – drums

Additional musicians

- Dan McGough – B3 organ

== Charts ==
Chart (2004)	Peak position
German Albums (Offizielle Top 100)	48
Swedish Albums (Sverigetopplistan)	29
US Billboard 200	31
