= Somewhere Between Heaven and Hell =

Studio album by Social Distortion
- Released: February 11, 1992
- Recorded: June–October 1991 at El Dorado Studios in Hollywood, California
- Genres: Punk rock; cowpunk; honky-tonk
- Length: 44:33
- Label: Epic
- Producer: Dave Jerden

Social Distortion chronology
Social Distortion (1990)	Somewhere Between Heaven and Hell (1992)	Mainliner: Wreckage From the Past (1995)

Singles from Somewhere Between Heaven and Hell
- 1. "Bad Luck" Released: 1992; 2. "Born to Lose" Released: 1992; 3. "Bye Bye Baby" Released: 1992; 4. "Cold Feelings" Released: 1992; 5. "When She Begins" Released: 1992

Somewhere Between Heaven and Hell is the fourth studio album by American punk rock band Social Distortion, released on February 11, 1992. Following up on the surprise success of their breakthrough singles "Ball and Chain" and "Story of My Life", It became a popular album and received positive reviews from music critics. It also spawned their highest-charting single "Bad Luck", which peaked at number 2 on the Modern Rock Tracks chart.

Somewhere Between Heaven and Hell is one of the best-selling albums of Social Distortion's career, achieving gold sales certification in the United States by 2000, and by 1996, the album had sold 296,000 copies. It peaked at number 76 on the US Billboard 200 and topped the Heatseekers chart, and is the band's last album with drummer Christopher Reece, who left in 1994.

The cover art features frontman Mike Ness mid-jump, while playing one of his Gibson Les Pauls. The cover is reminiscent and possibly an homage to Joan Jett jumping with her Gibson MelodyMaker over a canary yellow background on her third album, Album.

== Music style ==
Somewhere Between Heaven and Hell continues the melding of country and rockabilly influences with punk that began with Social Distortion's 1988 album Prison Bound. Clear influences include Hank Williams (on "This Time Darlin'") and Johnny Cash (on "99 to Life").

== Reception ==
Professional ratings
Review scores
Source	Rating
AllMusic	4.5/5 stars
Entertainment Weekly	B+
Los Angeles Times	3/4 stars
NME	5/10
Q	4/5 stars
The Rolling Stone Album Guide	4/5 stars
The Village Voice	B+

Reviews for Somewhere Between Heaven and Hell have generally been favorable. AllMusic's Paul Tinelli awards the album four-and-a-half stars out of five and praised the music as a "share of rollicking, straight-ahead hard rock." He also claims that Somewhere Between Heaven and Hell "had all the earmarks of a major commercial success with some radio friendly tunes and strong production, but it never found the large audience Epic Records expected."

== Track listing ==
All tracks are written by Mike Ness, except where noted.

Somewhere Between Heaven and Hell track listing
No.	Title	Writer(s)	Length
1.	"Cold Feelings"		3:31
2.	"Bad Luck"		4:26
3.	"Making Believe" (Jimmy Work cover)	Jimmy Work	4:12
4.	"Born to Lose"		4:09
5.	"Bye Bye Baby"		3:06
6.	"When She Begins"		5:04
7.	"99 to Life"		4:28
8.	"King of Fools" (Ed Bruce cover)	Ed Bruce	2:50
9.	"Sometimes I Do"		4:01
10.	"This Time Darlin'"		4:08
Total length:			44:33

CD bonus track listing
No.	Title	Length
11.	"Ghost Town Blues"	4:38
Total length:		49:11

Japanese bonus tracks listing
No.	Title	Writer(s)	Length
12.	"Alone and Forsaken" (Hank Williams cover)	Hank Williams	3:12
13.	"Mainliner 1992"		2:59
Total length:			53:23

== Personnel ==
Social Distortion

- Mike Ness – lead vocals, lead guitar
- Dennis Danell – rhythm guitar
- John Maurer – bass guitar, backing vocals
- Christopher Reece – drums

Production

- Dave Jerden – production, mixing
- Bryan Carlstrom – engineering
- Andy Wallace – mixing and engineering on "Bad Luck"
- Annette Cisneros – assistant engineering
- Eddy Schreyer – mastering

== Charts ==
Chart (1992)	Peak position
US Billboard 200	76
US Heatseekers Albums (Billboard)	1

== Certifications ==
Region	Certification	Certified units/sales
United States (RIAA)	Gold	500,000^{^}
^{^} Shipments figures based on certification alone.
