= Far Behind (Social Distortion song) =

Single by Social Distortion

from the album Greatest Hits
- Released: 2007
- Recorded: 2007
- Genre: Punk rock
- Length: 4:03
- Label: Time Bomb Recordings
- Songwriter(s): Mike Ness

Social Distortion singles chronology
"Death or Glory" (2005)	"Far Behind" (2007)	"Machine Gun Blues" (2010)

"Far Behind" is a previously unreleased composition from the veteran punk rock band Social Distortion. It is the closing track from their 2007 Greatest Hits album. According to the booklet of Greatest Hits, "Far Behind" was only recorded for that compilation. It received airplay on alternative rock stations in the United States and peaked at number 19 on the Billboard Modern Rock Tracks chart.

This is one of the first recordings with Brent Harding on bass and the last with Charlie Quintana on drums.

The instrumentals and structure of "Far Behind" are extremely similar to "Get the Time" by the Descendents, released on their 1986 album, "Enjoy!"

== Charts ==
Chart (2007)	Peak position
US Alternative Airplay (Billboard)	19
