= The Chanticleer =

Averett University's student-run news magazine

- Categories: Student/University
- Frequency: Monthly
- Total circulation: 3,000 (2011)
- First issue: 1922
- Company: Averett University
- Country: United States
- Language: English
- Website: averettstudentnews.org

The Chanticleer is Averett University's student-run news magazine. Since 1922, The Chanticleer has provided community news to the students, faculty and staff of Averett. CNM has also been used to refer to the magazine as "Chanticleer News Magazine" or, more recently with the expansion of CNM's initiatives into digital media, "Chanticleer News Media". Dr. Susan Huckstep has served as The Chanticleer's advisor since 2010.

== History ==
The Chanticleer was established in 1922, under the leadership of Dr. Ann Garbett. Its first 32-page issue included references to the Philomathean and Mnemosynean literary societies, poetry and a discussion of the university landscape 63 years into Averett's history. The first issue was dedicated to Miss Nelson Hackett, Art Director:

To Miss Nelson Hackett, our Director of Art, who has put into visible form the essence of our would-be wit and wisdom, we, the Staff of Chanticleer, with appreciation and affectionate esteem, do dedicate this issue.

=== CNM Au Courant ===
==== Digital distribution ====
In addition to continued print circulation, CNM began publishing issues online with its October 2010.

==== Layout and design ====
The Chanticleer has undergone numerous redesigns during its 89-year run including newspaper formats and an oversized magazine layout. As of Fall 2017, the publication runs at a digest size of 8.5" x 11".

== Past editors-in-chief ==
- Bobby Allen Roach, Spring 2012
- Ashley Jackson, Spring 2011
- David Pone, Fall 2010
- Thelma Ferguson, 1922
