= I Was Wrong (Social Distortion song) =

Single by Social Distortion

from the album White Light, White Heat, White Trash
- Released: November 11, 1996
- Genre: Punk rock
- Length: 3:58
- Label: Epic
- Songwriter: Mike Ness
- Producer: Michael Beinhorn

Social Distortion singles chronology
"Story of My Life" (1990)	"I Was Wrong" (1996)

"I Was Wrong" is a song by American punk rock band Social Distortion, released in September 1996 by Epic and 550 Music as the lead single from the band's fifth studio album White Light, White Heat, White Trash (1996). Written by vocalist and guitarist Mike Ness and produced by Michael Beinhorn, it became one of the group's most successful singles, reaching number 4 on the US Alternative Airplay chart, number 12 on the US rock chart and number 54 on the Hot 100 Airplay chart, and also peaking at number 163 on the UK Singles Chart. A re-recorded version was issued in 2007 and later appeared as a playable track in the 2008 music video game Rock Band 2.

== Background and themes ==
In a 2016 track-by-track discussion of White Light, White Heat, White Trash for Riot Fest, Ness described "I Was Wrong" as a song that listeners related to because of its "vulnerability", highlighting the rarity of a rock musician admitting "at certain times in my life I was an asshole" and admitting "You know what? You're right. I was wrong". The song lyrics chronicle feelings of anger and self-destruction and a desire to change course, through the lens of a first-person narrator, in line with the overarching themes of the album.

== Release and promotion ==
"I Was Wrong" was released to US rock radio in September 1996 and issued on CD and 7-inch vinyl single in several territories. Music VF, which compiles data from Billboard and the Official Charts Company, lists the single as debuting on the Hot 100 Airplay chart dated 21 September 1996 alongside entries on the magazine's rock and alternative charts. The band promoted the song while touring in support of White Light, White Heat, White Trash, and became a staple of their live set.

=== Music video ===
A promotional music video for "I Was Wrong" was produced in conjunction with the single's release.

== Charts ==
Chart (1996–1997)	Peak position
Canada Rock/Alternative (RPM)	11
US Alternative Airplay (Billboard)	4
US Hot 100 Airplay (Billboard)	54
US Mainstream Rock (Billboard)	12
