= Machine Gun Blues =

Single by Social Distortion

from the album Hard Times and Nursery Rhymes
- Released: November 16, 2010
- Recorded: February–July 2010
- Genre: Punk rock; cowpunk
- Label: Epitaph
- Songwriters: Mike Ness, Jonny Wickersham

Social Distortion singles chronology
"Far Behind" (2007)	"Machine Gun Blues" (2010)	"Up Around the Bend" (2013)

"Machine Gun Blues" is a song by American punk rock band Social Distortion, released in 2010 as the first single from their seventh album Hard Times and Nursery Rhymes.

The song was featured on Season 4, Episode 7 of Sons of Anarchy, and used by WWE to promote a feud between The Miz and Randy Orton at the 2011 WWE Royal Rumble.

== Charts ==
Chart (2011)	Peak position
US Alternative Airplay (Billboard)	10
US Hot Rock & Alternative Songs (Billboard)	20
