= Ball and Chain (Social Distortion song) =

Single by Social Distortion

from the album Social Distortion
- Released: 1990
- Recorded: 1989
- Genre: Cowpunk; honky-tonk
- Length: 5:44
- Label: Epic
- Songwriter: Mike Ness
- Producer: Dave Jerden

Social Distortion singles chronology
"Story of My Life" (1990)	"Ball and Chain" (1990)	"Ring of Fire" (1990)

"Ball and Chain" is a song by Southern California punk rock band Social Distortion. Written by Mike Ness in 1987, it is featured on their self-titled album released in 1990, as well as on Live at the Roxy (1998).

In the words of Ness, "Ball and Chain" is "a hard luck story," a forceful cry, a lament, a plea, a "folk prayer."

The music video was directed by Tony van den Ende and edited by Scott C. Wilson.

== Charts ==
Chart (1990)	Peak position
US Alternative Airplay (Billboard)	13
