= Mommy's Little Monster (album) =

Studio album by Social Distortion
- Released: June 1983
- Recorded: December 24, 1982, at The Casbah in Fullerton, California
- Genres: Punk rock; hardcore punk
- Length: 27:25
- Label: 13th Floor Records
- Producers: Chaz Ramirez; Social Distortion

Social Distortion chronology
Mommy's Little Monster (1983)	Prison Bound (1988)

Singles from Mommy's Little Monster
- 1. "Another State of Mind" Released: 1983

Mommy's Little Monster is the debut studio album by American punk rock band Social Distortion, released in 1983 through the label 13th Floor Records. It is Social Distortion's only album to feature bassist Brent Liles and drummer Derek O'Brien, both of whom were out of the band by early 1984 and would be replaced by John Maurer and Chris Reece respectively.

Mommy's Little Monster is notably different from the band's subsequent releases, featuring styles of traditional punk rock and hardcore. The album received underground acclaim from punk rock fanzines, and it has been acknowledged as influential and inspirational to the then-burgeoning pop-punk and skate punk scenes.

== Background ==
In 1982, Social Distortion took part in the tour with Youth Brigade (as chronicled in the documentary Another State of Mind). Mommy's Little Monster was recorded at the Casbah in Fullerton, California, on December 24, 1982. They recorded the album in a single session for numerous hours to cut down studio costs.

== Reissues ==
Mommy's Little Monster was reissued several times, with different formats and labels. The album was originally released on vinyl LP in 1983 on 13th Floor Records, a label owned by their manager at the time, Monk Rock.

The Triple X Records label reissued the album on CD, vinyl, and cassette in 1989. Six years later, Mommy's Little Monster was re-issued once again when Ness started Time Bomb Recordings with some of the profits he made from Social Distortion's Epic releases and reissued Mommy's Little Monster on vinyl, cassette and CD through a distribution deal with Arista Records. A third reissue was released in 2010 on Epitaph Records in Europe and the United Kingdom. A gramophone picture disc version of Mommy's Little Monster was released in 2001.

== Reception ==
Professional ratings
Review scores
Source	Rating
AllMusic	4/5 stars

Paul Tinelli of AllMusic gave Mommy's Little Monster four out of five stars and called it "the epitome of early-'80s suburban California punk and provided inspiration for many future Californians, including the Offspring and Rancid" and said that it "finds the band supplying plenty of attitude and aggression as they rip through nine tracks worth of hard, fast, power chord-filled tracks loaded with snarling anti-establishment lyrics and themes." Tinelli also stated that "The Creeps" and "Telling Them" "show a young punk group that is very angry, and they were going to let society know it whether they wanted to hear it or not", and adds that the title track "Mommy's Little Monster" "gives you a good idea of the characters Social Distortion was surrounded by in the scene of the day."

In a 1984 Trouser Press review, Don Howland said, "Cruising on a buzz of non-stop stun guitar and Ness' smoky deadpan vocals, this catchy-as-dermatophytosis punk pop is a surprisingly sophisticated product of the LA underground. Ness proves to be one of current punks better songwriters." Howland concluded that calling the album an "instant classic,...sounds about right."

Tim Yohannan of Maximumrocknroll said "You've got to know by now what Social Distortion sound like—those distinctive vocals, the harmonies, the rockin' guitars, and melodic hooks galore. Their album is filled with more of the same. Nothing here is too frantic except 'The Creeps', which really blazes forth. There's precious little exciting punky-pop around these days, but this is one of the rare examples of it."

== Track listing ==
All tracks are written by Mike Ness and Dennis Danell.

Side one
No.	Title	Length
1.	"The Creeps (I Just Wanna Give You)"	2:03
2.	"Another State of Mind"	2:38
3.	"It Wasn't a Pretty Picture"	3:10
4.	"Telling Them"	3:12
Total length:		11:03

Side two
No.	Title	Length
1.	"Hour of Darkness"	2:49
2.	"Mommy's Little Monster"	3:33
3.	"Anti-Fashion"	2:19
4.	"All the Answers"	2:23
5.	"Moral Threat"	5:16
Total length:		16:22 27:25

Earlier versions of "All the Answers" and "Moral Threat" were originally recorded in 1981 and can be heard on the 1995 compilation Mainliner: Wreckage from the Past.

== Personnel ==
Social Distortion

- Mike Ness (as Michael Ness) – vocals, lead guitars
- Dennis Danell – rhythm guitars
- Brent Liles – bass guitar
- Derek O'Brien – drums, percussion, backing vocals

Additional personnel

- Chaz Ramirez – production, organ on "Hour of Darkness" and "Moral Threat"
- Social Distortion – production
