= Mainliner: Wreckage from the Past =

Compilation album by Social Distortion
- Released: July 18, 1995
- Recorded: Track 1–6: April 1981; Track 7–10: October 1981
- Genre: Punk rock; hardcore punk
- Length: 24:38
- Label: Time Bomb Recordings
- Producer: Chaz Ramirez, Gary Hirstius

Social Distortion chronology
Somewhere Between Heaven and Hell (1992)	Mainliner: Wreckage from the Past (1995)	White Light, White Heat, White Trash (1996)

Professional ratings
Review scores
Source	Rating
Allmusic	2.5/5 stars

Mainliner: Wreckage from the Past is a compilation album by American punk rock band Social Distortion. It was released on July 18, 1995, and contains songs which were recorded in 1981. It is a collection of singles and B-sides that had never appeared on any of the band's full-length albums (except for "Moral Threat" and "All the Answers"). This album was released by Mike Ness' Time Bomb Recordings (distributed by Arista Records) in 1995 along with the re-release of Mommy's Little Monster and Prison Bound.

== Track listing ==
All songs written by Mike Ness unless otherwise noted.

1. "1945" (Posh Boy Version) – 1:52
2. "Playpen" (Posh Boy Version) – 2:40
3. "Mainliner" – 2:30
4. "Moral Threat" – 3:35
5. "All the Answers" – 2:12
6. "Justice for All" – 2:03
7. "Under My Thumb" (Mick Jagger/Keith Richards) – 2:04
8. "1945" (13th Floor Version) – 2:03
9. "Playpen" (13th Floor Version) – 2:58
10. "Mass Hysteria" – 2:41 (Ness/Liles)

"Justice for All" was later rerecorded by Social Distortion in 1988 for their second album, Prison Bound, as "It's the Law".

"Justice for All" and the Posh Boy version of "Playpen" first appeared on the compilation cassette The Future Looks Bright, released by Posh Boy with side A containing Posh Boy produced bands and side B containing SST artists.

The Posh Boy version of "1945" first appeared on the compilation album Rodney on the ROQ, Volume 2.

"Moral Threat" and "All the Answers" were later rerecorded by Social Distortion in 1982 for the band's first album, Mommy's Little Monster.

- Mainliner: Wreckage from the Past features the only recordings by Social Distortion in which Brent Liles performs vocals

== Personnel ==
- Mike Ness – guitar, vocals all tracks
- Dennis Danell – bass guitar and vocals (tracks 1–6), rhythm guitar and vocals (tracks 7–10)
- John "Carrot" Stevenson – drums, vocals (tracks 1–6)
- Brent Liles – bass guitar, vocals (tracks 7–10)
- Derek O'Brien – drums, vocals (tracks 7–10)
