= Bad Luck (Social Distortion song) =

Single by Social Distortion

from the album Somewhere Between Heaven and Hell
- Released: 1992
- Recorded: June–October 1991 at El Dorado Studios in Hollywood, California
- Genre: Cowpunk; punk rock
- Length: 4:26
- Label: Epic
- Songwriter: Mike Ness
- Producer: Dave Jerden

Social Distortion singles chronology
"Story of My Life" (1990)	"Bad Luck" (1992)	"Born to Lose" (1992)

"Bad Luck" is a song by American punk rock band Social Distortion from their fourth studio album Somewhere Between Heaven and Hell which was released as a single in 1992.

It was the album's first single, and it peaked at number 2 on the Modern Rock Tracks chart, marking the highest initial charting single in Social Distortion's career. There has not been a higher charting Social Distortion single since.

== Album appearances ==
As well as appearing on "Somewhere Between Heaven and Hell", the song was re-recorded on Social Distortion's "Greatest Hits" album which was released in 2007.

== Cultural references ==
In Season 8, ep 8 of Animal Kingdom, Bad Luck is playing during a flashback scene, when Pope walks in on Baz and Julia during an "intimate moment."

In the popular Fox crime drama Bones, Dr. Temperance Brennan walks in on Special Agent Seeley Booth in his bathroom while Bad Luck is playing.

In Season 9 of the CW series Supernatural, the song is playing on the jukebox in the biker bar occupied by Bartholomew's faction of angels. It continues to play during and after the angel battle against the Melody Ministry Glee Club (also possessed by another angel faction).

Bad Luck is featured on a trailer for MLB 2K10 released February 2010. It is also in the game as the first song on the soundtrack.

== Rock Band ==
The song was released as downloadable content for the video game Rock Band on May 12, 2009.

== Charts ==
Chart (1992)	Peak position
US Alternative Airplay (Billboard)	2
US Mainstream Rock (Billboard)	44
