= Randy Carr =

American drummer (1956–2002)

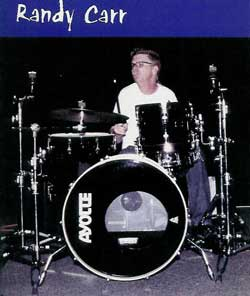
Randy would often play a 4-piece drum kit as in this circa year 2000 photo. He enjoyed the classic 4-piece configuration and knew how to get the most from it. During this time Carr predominantly used Ayotte drums (shown), DW drums, and Zildjian cymbals.

Randy Carr (August 13, 1956 – March 27, 2002) was an American musician who played drums in many rock music groups in the Orange County area of Southern California including 7th Grade, Silicone Silos, 16 Tons, and Social Distortion. Carr also played guitar.

== Early life ==
Randy Carr was born in Santa Monica, California and started playing drums at the age of 12 years. Over the years he played Carr lived and worked in Fullerton, California. In addition to playing drums in local bands, he was a drum instructor and wrote the book, Advanced Grooves for the Advanced Drummer as an aid for his students.

== Career ==
In 1993, Carr joined up with former The Mechanics guitarist Tim Racca to form 16 Tons. The band 16 Tons, though short-lived, received much critical acclaim for their 1993 instrumental rock CD, Motorhome, consisting primarily of Racca's compositions. DRUM! Magazine wrote in its August 1996 issue, "16 Tons explodes with furious energy, propelled by Carr's powerhouse drumming."

Carr worked with the band Social Distortion from 1993 through 1995. He toured as their drummer at all live performances during this period. After a Los Angeles show, Mike Boehm wrote in the May 8, 1995 Los Angeles Times, "S.D.'s set was the longest and by far the finest of the day, 55 minutes of dark majesty powered by a new drummer, Randy Carr, who played his first major gig with the band and helped Social Distortion churn and drive with impressive force and fresh suppleness." He was also the studio drummer for OC punk band The Vectors, and is credited on their album Behind the Orange Curtain.

== Death ==
In late 2001 Carr began suffering from Cushing's syndrome. He died from the disease on March 27, 2002 at the University of California, Irvine Medical Center in Irvine, California.

Randy Carr
