= Social Distortion (album) =

Studio album by Social Distortion
- Released: March 27, 1990
- Recorded: August–October 1989
- Studios: Track Record, (North Hollywood, Los Angeles, California)
- Genres: Punk rock; cowpunk; roots rock
- Length: 41:16
- Label: Epic
- Producer: Dave Jerden

Social Distortion chronology
Prison Bound (1988)	Social Distortion (1990)	Somewhere Between Heaven and Hell (1992)

Singles from Social Distortion
- 1. "Let It Be Me" Released: 1990; 2. "Ball and Chain" Released: March 27, 1990; 3. "Ring of Fire" Released: 1990; 4. "Sick Boys" Released: 1990; 5. "Story of My Life" Released: 1990

Social Distortion is the third studio album and major label debut by the American punk rock band of the same name, released on March 27, 1990, through Epic Records. The album furthered the rockabilly, blues and country music experimentation of Prison Bound with songs like "Drug Train" and the radio hit "Ball and Chain".

The focus on the alternative rock scene helped bring attention to Social Distortion. The singles "Story of My Life" and "Ball and Chain" were able to find an audience on alternative rock radio and on MTV. Social Distortion was one of the band's most successful albums to date, and their first to enter the Billboard 200; the release peaked at number 128. The album has been certified gold by the RIAA in the United States. By 1996, Social Distortion had sold at least 250,000 copies, becoming the band's second best-selling album in the United States (their next album Somewhere Between Heaven and Hell sold 296,000 copies).

== Background and production ==
After touring in support of its previous full-length studio album, Prison Bound, Social Distortion signed with Epic in 1989 and began work on its first album for a major label. The album's recording sessions took place from August to October 1989 at Track Record in North Hollywood, Los Angeles. It was produced by Dave Jerden, who also produced their 1992 follow-up Somewhere Between Heaven and Hell.

== Artwork ==
The album's cover features three pieces of ripped paper, each with a different scene on them. The first piece features a rendition of Eliot Ness with a Tommy gun attempting to break a door with his right foot. The second piece features an empty liquor bottle held in a drunk woman's hand. The final piece features a woman putting on thigh high stockings. The pictures are drawn all in blue on a gray background.

== Reception ==
Professional ratings
Review scores
Source	Rating
AllMusic	4.5/5 stars
Chicago Tribune	4/4 stars
Christgau's Consumer Guide	(1-star Honorable Mention)
Los Angeles Times	3/5 stars
Rolling Stone	3/5 stars
The Rolling Stone Album Guide	3.5/5 stars

Reviews for Social Distortion have generally been favorable. AllMusic's Mark Deming awards the album four-and-a-half stars out of five and claimed that Social Distortion "began to metamorphasize from a rather ordinary L.A. hardcore band into a roots rock band willing to make with more than their share of the attitude, and this process continued on their self-titled third album." For the album's musical direction, Deming states "Mike Ness and Dennis Danell's guitars sound lean, sharp, and powerful; Ness's vocals are better controlled than ever before; and Christopher Reece's drums have a tight snap that suits both the thrashier numbers as well as the slower, bluesier tunes." He also states that Social Distortion is not a "great roots rock album, but it's a pretty good one, and it's better and more affecting than anything this band had cranked out before."

Social Distortion entered the Billboard 200 album charts in September 1990, just six months after its release. It peaked at number 128 and remained on the chart for 22 weeks. Thanks to the success of the singles "Let It Be Me", "Ball and Chain", "Story of My Life" and "Ring of Fire", Social Distortion became the band's best-selling album of their recording career, achieving gold sales certification in the United States.

== Track listing ==
All tracks are written by Mike Ness, except where noted.

Social Distortion track listing
No.	Title	Writer(s)	Length
1.	"So Far Away"	Ness, John Maurer	3:37
2.	"Let It Be Me"		4:16
3.	"Story of My Life"		5:48
4.	"Sick Boys"		3:19
5.	"Ring of Fire" (Johnny Cash cover)	June Carter Cash, Merle Kilgore	3:51
6.	"Ball and Chain"		5:44
7.	"It Coulda Been Me"		3:52
8.	"She's a Knockout"		3:52
9.	"A Place in My Heart"		3:15
10.	"Drug Train"		3:42
Total length:			41:16

Japanese bonus track lsiting
No.	Title	Writer(s)	Length
11.	"It's All Over Now" (The Valentinos cover)	Bobby Womack, Shirley Womack	4:09
12.	"Shame on Me"		2:11
Total length:			47:36

== Trivia ==
- A cover of "Sick Boys" can be found on MxPx's album Let it Happen.
- "Story of My Life" is a playable song in the video game Guitar Hero III: Legends of Rock
- "Story of My Life" and "Ring of Fire" were later released as downloadable content for the video game Rock Band
- "Ring of Fire" also appears in the soundtrack of Shaun White Snowboarding
- "Ball and Chain" is featured on the video game Saint's Row: The Third
- "Ball and Chain" is featured in "Buried Treasure", an episode of My Name is Earl.
- The music video for "Ball and Chain" was directed by Tony van den Ende and edited by Scott C. Wilson.

== Personnel ==
Social Distortion

- Mike Ness – lead vocals, lead guitar
- Dennis Danell – rhythm guitar
- John Maurer – bass guitar, backing vocals
- Christopher Reece – drums

Additional personnel

- Dave Jerden – production, recording, mixing
- Eric Von Herzen – harmonica on "It Coulda Been Me" and "Drug Train"

== Charts ==
Chart (1990)	Peak position
US Billboard 200	128

Chart (2015)	Peak position
US Indie Store Album Sales (Billboard)	18

== Certifications ==
Region	Certification	Certified units/sales
United States (RIAA)	Gold	500,000^{^}
^{^} Shipments figures based on certification alone.
