= Christopher Reece =

American musician

Christopher Reece (sometimes known as Chris Reece) (born July 28, 1959) is an American musician. He was the drummer of The Lewd (1981–1983) and Social Distortion (1984–1993).

Reece was 22 years old in 1981 when he started playing drums for The Lewd. He left the band in 1983. The following year he was hired by Mike Ness to join Social Distortion, along with bassist John Maurer. Reece's first recording with the band was the 1988 release Prison Bound. He also played drums on their next two albums, the eponymous Social Distortion (1990) and Somewhere Between Heaven and Hell (1992). Reece left Social Distortion in 1993 and was replaced by Randy Carr.

In 1998 Reece started producing an antique shopping guide called Reece's Antique and Retro Shopper's Map. He learned about antiques from his parents who had bought and sold antiques in the 1950s and 1960s. Reece's original map included (and still does) the antique and vintage stores along the Fourth Street area of Long Beach, which he named Retro Row.

In 2002 Reece bought an abandoned 1950s diner in Long Beach, CA called Chipper's Corner. He turned it into a seafood restaurant and bar now named The Pike Restaurant and Bar.
