= Story of My Life (Social Distortion song) =

Single by Social Distortion

from the album Social Distortion
- Released: 1990
- Genre: Cowpunk; punk rock
- Length: 5:48
- Label: Epic
- Songwriter: Mike Ness
- Producer: Dave Jerden

Social Distortion singles chronology
"Sick Boys" (1990)	"Story of My Life" (1990)	"Bad Luck" (1992)

"Story of My Life" is a 1990 song by American punk rock band Social Distortion, written by frontman Mike Ness. It was released as a single and also appeared on their self-titled album as well as Live at the Roxy live album. The song describes a man looking back wistfully on life, such as a love interest he had as a teenager, and how things have changed and how quickly his life (and the opportunity) has passed him by.

== Track listing ==
1. "Story of My Life"
2. "1945"
3. "Mommy's Little Monster"
4. "Pretty Thing"
5. "Shame on Me"

== Personnel ==
- Mike Ness – vocals, lead guitar
- Dennis Danell – rhythm guitar, backing vocals
- John Maurer – bass guitar, backing vocals
- Christopher Reece – drums

== TV, movie, and video game appearances ==
- Theme song for the short-lived TV show Surviving Jack
- Reality Bites, starring Winona Ryder
- Orange County, starring Colin Hanks and Jack Black
- Life or Something Like It, starring Angelina Jolie
- The Break-Up, starring Vince Vaughn and Jennifer Aniston
- Trailer for Stranger than Fiction
- The Hammer, starring Adam Carolla (Live at the Roxy version)
- Guitar Hero III: Legends of Rock (cover version by WaveGroup)
- Downloadable Content for Rock Band 2 (2007 re-recording)
- Rocksmith 2014, as Downloadable Content
- Love, in the fourth episode of season one, "Party in the Hills."

== Covers ==
- Reel Big Fish – We're Not Happy 'til You're Not Happy (2005)
