= Prison Bound =

Studio album by Social Distortion
- Released: January 18, 1988
- Recorded: 1987
- Studio: Casbah Recording Studio (Fullerton, California)
- Genre: Punk rock; cowpunk
- Length: 41:05
- Label: Restless
- Producer: Social Distortion, Chaz Ramirez

Social Distortion chronology
Mommy's Little Monster (1983)	Prison Bound (1988)	Social Distortion (1990)

Singles from Prison Bound
- 1. "Prison Bound" Released: 1988

Prison Bound is the second studio album by Social Distortion, released in 1988. It was the first album with bass guitarist John Maurer and drummer Christopher Reece. It expands the punk rock sound of the band's first album, Mommy's Little Monster (1983), by adding influences from country music and blues rock.

== Overview ==
Prison Bound took almost half a decade to materialize, with the initial attempt to record and release the follow-up to Mommy's Little Monster dating back to 1984. The album was shelved for a few years, and it would not be re-recorded and completed until 1987, following frontman Mike Ness' recovery from drug addiction and Social Distortion's signing to then-independent Restless/Enigma Records. Unlike many of the band's albums, no singles were released for this album, but the title track "Prison Bound" received some heavy rotation from commercial radio stations (particularly KROQ-FM), and the song's success attracted attention from major labels, including Epic Records, to whom Social Distortion would sign in 1989.

The first track, "It's the Law", is a remake of "Justice for All", which appeared on the 1981 compilation album The Future Looks Bright (and later on the 1995 compilation album Mainliner: Wreckage from the Past). It also contains a cover version of "Backstreet Girl", originally recorded by the Rolling Stones. The album's title track references Johnny Cash's "I Walk the Line".

== Reception ==
Professional ratings
Review scores
Source	Rating
AllMusic	4.5/5 stars
The Encyclopedia of Popular Music	3/5 stars
MusicHound Rock: The Essential Album Guide	2/5 stars
The Rolling Stone Album Guide	3/5 stars

Trouser Press wrote that "although Prison Bound lacks the all-out dynamics of Monster ... it’s still a maturely paced, knowing follow-up, and not just for punks." Nick Robinson, reviewer of British music newspaper Music Week, noted band's adulting in comparison with early recordings. He found there "upright bursts of aggression, frustration and depression tell a vivid tale of growing up and blues and country influences add depth to this blunt, honest and thrilling account".

== Track listing ==
All tracks are written by Mike Ness, except where noted.

Side one
No.	Title	Writer(s)	Length
1.	"It's the Law"		2:38
2.	"Indulgence"	Dennis Danell, Ness	4:34
3.	"Like an Outlaw (For You)"	Danell, Ness	5:21
4.	"Back Street Girl" (The Rolling Stones cover)	Jagger–Richards	4:22
5.	"Prison Bound"		5:24
Total length:			22:19

Side two
No.	Title	Writer(s)	Length
1.	"No Pain No Gain"		3:42
2.	"On My Nerves"	Danell, Ness	4:23
3.	"I Want What I Want"	Danell, Ness	3:02
4.	"Lawless"		3:21
5.	"Lost Child"		4:18
Total length:			18:46

== Personnel ==
- Mike Ness – lead vocal, lead guitar
- Dennis Danell – rhythm guitar
- John Maurer – bass guitar, backing vocals
- Christopher Reece – drums
