= Social Distortion =

American punk rock band

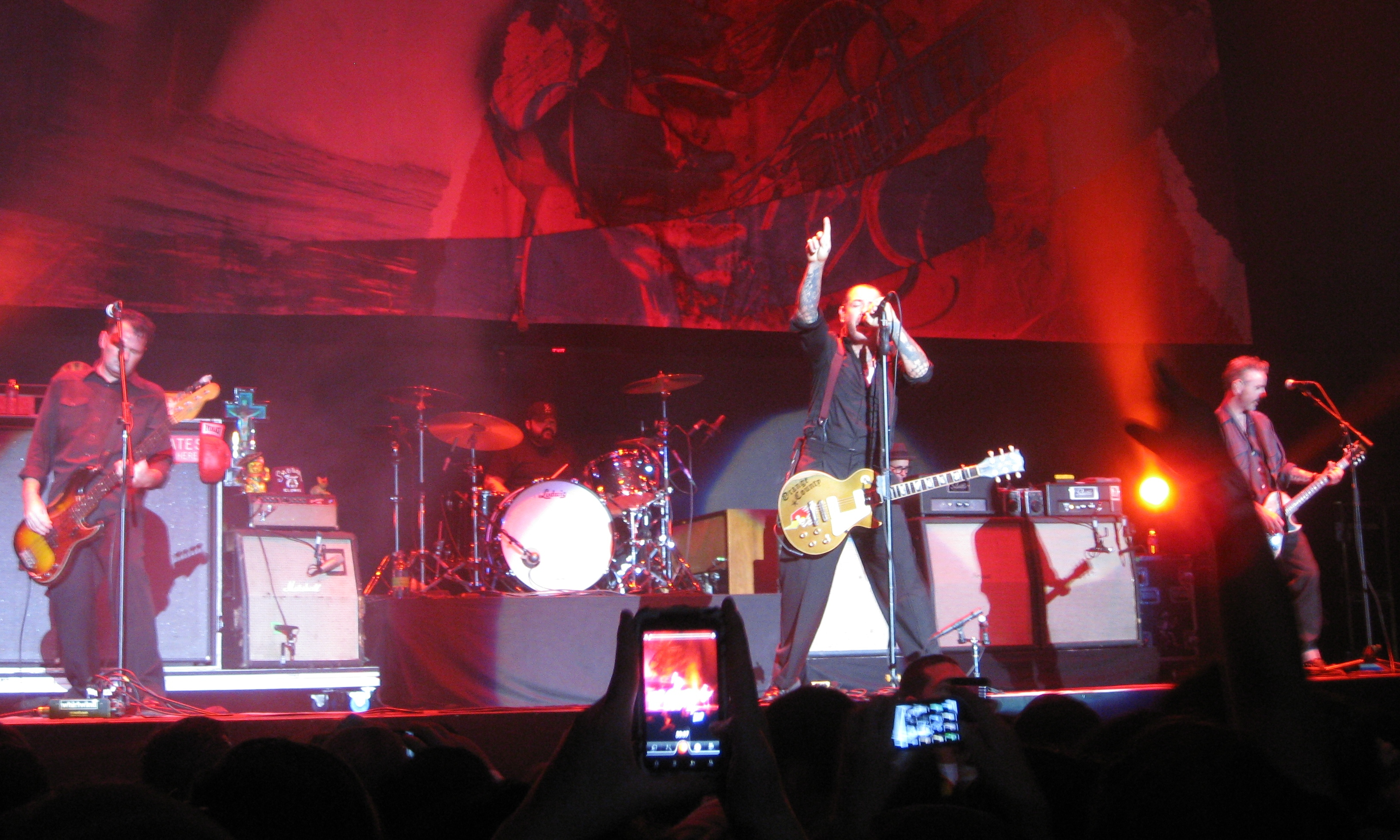
- Left to right: Harding, Hidalgo, Ness, and Wickersham in 2011

Background information
- Also known as: Social D; Sx Dx
- Origin: Fullerton, California, U.S.
- Genres: Punk rock; cowpunk; rock and roll; hardcore punk (early)
- Works: Discography
- Years active: 1978–present
- Labels: 13th Floor; Posh Boy; Restless; Epic; Time Bomb; Epitaph
- Spinoffs: Adolescents; D.I.
- Members: Mike Ness; Jonny "2 Bags" Wickersham; Brent Harding; David Hidalgo Jr.
- Past members: List of Social Distortion band members
- Website: socialdistortion.com

Social Distortion is an American punk rock band formed in 1978 in Fullerton, California. It consists of Mike Ness (vocals, guitar), Jonny Wickersham (guitar), Brent Harding (bass), and David Hidalgo Jr. (drums).

Emerging from the Orange County hardcore scene of the late 1970s, alongside Agent Orange and the Adolescents, Social Distortion went on a temporary hiatus in the mid-1980s, due to Ness's drug addiction and troubles with the law which resulted in extended stints in various rehabilitation centers that lasted for two years. Following their reformation, the band shifted its style to have strong influences from country, blues, and early rock and roll. Since its inception, the band's lineup has seen significant turnover, with Ness as the only constant member. Past longtime members have included guitarist Dennis Danell, bassist John Maurer and drummers Christopher Reece and Charlie Quintana. Social Distortion's current lineup, intact since 2010, is the band's longest-lasting lineup. After 48 years of performing, Social Distortion continues to tour and record music.

To date, Social Distortion has released eight full-length studio albums, two compilations, one live album, and two DVDs. They released two albums—Mommy's Little Monster (1983) and Prison Bound (1988)—before signing a three-album contract with Epic Records in 1989. Social Distortion achieved mainstream success with their 1990 self-titled third album, which produced their well-known hit singles "Ball and Chain", "Story of My Life", and the cover of Johnny Cash's "Ring of Fire", and was certified gold by the RIAA. The band's next two albums, including their second gold record Somewhere Between Heaven and Hell (1992) and its follow-up White Light, White Heat, White Trash (1996), were also well-received. They have since released three more albums: Sex, Love and Rock 'n' Roll (2004), Hard Times and Nursery Rhymes (2011) and Born to Kill (2026). Dubbed by Steven Blush as "the Rolling Stones of hardcore", Social Distortion is considered one of the best-selling and most influential punk rock bands, with more than three million albums sold worldwide.

== History ==
=== Early years (1978–1982) ===
Social Distortion was formed in 1978 by Mike Ness, inspired by the Sex Pistols and many other British punk bands as well as rock acts such as the Rolling Stones. Aside from Ness on guitar and Casey Royer on drums, early members included Mark Garrett on bass and former Cal State Fullerton basketball player Tom Corvin on vocals. Garrett was succeeded by Rikk Agnew in late 1978. On the origins of the band's name, Royer recalled "Mike was like 15, trying to play guitar but he couldn't. Social Distortion was named for my distortion pedal, which I gave to Mike to play 'cause back then he was no good."

Their early music was composed by Ness with lyrics by Royer and sometimes Corvin, and many songs were retired after only a few performances. After Corvin left in the fall of 1979 to attend graduate school at Bob Jones University, Ness recruited his high school friend Dennis Danell to join the band on guitar even though Danell had never played an instrument before. When Danell was brought in, the other members left as they did not want to wait for him to learn. Before joining the Adolescents in 1980, Royer and Agnew played with Garrett in a separate band named Social Distortion consisting of Royer on vocals, Garrett on bass, Rikk Agnew on drums, and Frank Agnew and Tim Maag on guitars. Social Distortion's first real show was in early 1979 at the Cuckoo's Nest nightclub on Placentia Avenue in Costa Mesa, California. Ness and Danell would remain the only constant members for the next two decades with bass and drum members changing every few years. Both the Adolescents song "Kids of the Black Hole" and Social Distortion song "The Playpen" chronicled this period of the band's history.

Social Distortion's first single, "Mainliner" b/w "Playpen" featuring Ness on guitar and vocals, Danell on bass, and Carrot on drums, was issued in 1981 by Posh Boy, the label responsible for releasing the first singles and albums of many of the local O.C. punk bands. Rodney Bingenheimer of KROQ-FM was responsible for much of the radio play in Orange County, California, that punk received in the early 1980s, and took a liking to Social Distortion, featuring the single "1945" on the second volume of the compilation album, Rodney on the ROQ. The same song would also appear on 1983's Blood on the ROQ and 1989's The Best Of Rodney on the ROQ compilations.

In 1982, the band—now consisting of Ness, Danell (who now played rhythm guitar), Brent Liles on bass, and Derek O'Brien on drums—embarked on their first bi-national tour of the US and Canada with fellow punk band Youth Brigade. The trip was chronicled in the punk rockumentary Another State of Mind, which was not released until 1984.

=== Mommy's Little Monster, temporary hiatus and Prison Bound (1983–1988) ===
After returning from the Another State of Mind tour in 1982, Social Distortion began work on their debut album, Mommy's Little Monster. Recorded in December of 1982, the album was released in early 1983 on the band's own label, 13th Floor Records. Mommy's Little Monster includes the title track as well as the song for which the previous tour was named, "Another State of Mind". This was the album that "gained the band a national name in punk circles".

Ness mentions in his DVD commentary that he really had nowhere to stay when he got back to California after the tour ended, so he crashed on the couches of whoever would have him. He details how he plunged headfirst into serious drug addiction and ended up being strung out on heroin for weeks at a time. In 1983, Liles and O'Brien left the band in the middle of a show on New Year's Eve, and were replaced soon thereafter by Ness' high school friend John Maurer and a man named Bob Stubbs. This line-up lasted only a short time until Christopher Reece joined on drums. Ness's drug habit continued throughout 1984 and 1985 as the band continued to gain success with Another State of Mind appearing as one of the punk rarities on MTV, and touring in California and Arizona. As a result of Ness's escalating drug habit and troubles with the law, Social Distortion briefly went on hiatus in 1985. During this time, Ness was in and out of various rehabilitation centers and jails.

Social Distortion resurfaced in 1986, when Ness completed a drug rehabilitation program. The band released its second album, Prison Bound, two years later in 1988—over five years after their debut. The album included John Maurer on bass and Christopher Reece on drums. Although Prison Bound never charted on Billboard, the title track had received extensive airplay on the Los Angeles radio station, KROQ-FM.

A notable style change takes place in Prison Bound, which takes on a definite country/western flavor and marks the start of the band's entrance into a rock subgenre sometimes called "cowpunk". Country legend Johnny Cash and the Rolling Stones' honky tonk style became more prominent influences on Social Distortion's music at this time. There are references to Cash and the Stones in the songs "Prison Bound" and "On My Nerves".

The multi-year gap between albums became a pattern for Social Distortion. Ness acknowledges in a 2003 interview that it is a little backward, marketing-wise, to play songs for the fans for a few years before recording them—but it has always worked well for them. "We know which songs are going to be fan favorites on the record before we even record them."

=== Major label years and mainstream success (1989–1996) ===
After the release of Prison Bound, Social Distortion left Restless Records and signed with Epic. The band then returned to the studio around the summer/fall of 1989, with producer Dave Jerden, to begin recording their self-titled third album, which was released in 1990. It was Social Distortion's first album that was not financed by the band. The album includes the singles "Ball and Chain" and "Story of My Life" as well as a cover of Johnny Cash's "Ring of Fire". The self-titled album, which was the band's first to chart on the Billboard 200, fared better than both Mommy's Little Monster and Prison Bound, and is often credited as Social Distortion's best known work, with sales continuing 36 years after its release. It is also sometimes cited as among the best rock albums of 1990—the album is said to "split the difference between rockabilly and Ramones-style punk."

The band's fourth album, Somewhere Between Heaven and Hell, was released in 1992. The album included two hit singles: "Bad Luck", and "When She Begins". Somewhere Between Heaven and Hell surpassed all their previous albums in popularity. The album has a similar sound to the previous, eponymous, album, said to be a blend of "punk, blues, country and rockabilly". After the release of this album, drummer Christopher Reece left Social Distortion in 1994 and was replaced by Randy Carr. Carr toured with the band and played drums on live performances until he left in 1995.

The band took another hiatus after the release of Somewhere Between Heaven and Hell, and did not return to the studio until 1995. During the break, Social Distortion released a compilation album, Mainliner: Wreckage From the Past (1995), featuring pre-Mommy's Little Monster cuts. It contains two versions of "1945" and "Playpen" from their two indie labels, 13th Floor and Posh Boy, and also a cover of the Rolling Stones' "Under My Thumb".

The band returned to the studio in 1995 to record White Light, White Heat, White Trash, which was released in 1996. The album is said to have taken on a harder sound than those preceding it, and to not focus as much on their previous blues and rockabilly sound. The single "I Was Wrong" received wide radio play and is said to resemble "the classic sound more than any other track on the album". The album also features the singles "When the Angels Sing", which is said to be a tribute to Ness's grandmother, who was an avid supporter of the band, and "Don't Drag Me Down". The album also included a re-recorded version of "Under My Thumb", a cover of the Rolling Stones song, as a hidden track. Former Danzig drummer Chuck Biscuits joined the band between the recording and release of the album, and is credited in the liner notes although this album actually features one time Journey drummer Deen Castronovo. White Light, White Heat, White Trash was the final Social Distortion album recorded with Dennis Danell before his death in 2000.

=== Second hiatus, Danell's death and Sex, Love and Rock 'n' Roll (1997–2004) ===
In 1997, Social Distortion left Epic and returned to Time Bomb Recordings for the first time in eight years. It released its first (and only) live album, Live at the Roxy in 1998. Social Distortion went on hiatus again as Ness went solo, releasing two albums, Cheating at Solitaire and Under the Influences, featuring song covers, in 1999.

Dennis Danell died on February 29, 2000, in his Newport Beach home after apparently suffering a brain aneurysm, leaving Ness as the only remaining original member of the band. There have been some rumors claiming that the band broke up again, following his death. He was replaced by former U.S. Bombs, Cadillac Tramps and L.A.'s Youth Brigade guitarist Jonny Wickersham, who had previously been Danell's guitar technician. Biscuits also left during that time, and was replaced by Charlie Quintana. After Danell's death, the band continued touring semi-frequently, playing sold-out shows in the Los Angeles area around the New Year for three straight years.

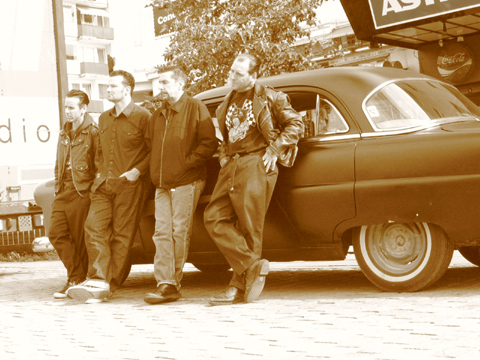
The band's 2004–2009 lineup, left to right: Wickersham, Harding, Quintana, and Ness

Social Distortion started work on the follow-up to White Light, White Heat, White Trash in 2000, which was originally to be released in the fall of that year, but it was not completed. Since 2001, due to the band's ongoing tour schedule, the album's release was put on hold several times. In the fall of 2003, after completing demos, Social Distortion returned to the studio with producer Cameron Webb to complete the album. Sex, Love and Rock 'n' Roll was the band's first album with Wickersham and Quintana. A month before its September 28, 2004, release, longtime bassist John Maurer left the band to stay with his family, and was replaced by Rancid's Matt Freeman, who was replaced later that year by current bassist Brent Harding.

=== Subsequent activities and departure of Quintana (2005–2009) ===
Social Distortion continued touring on and off between 2005 and 2007. The band was scheduled to headline the Soundwave Festival in Australia in February–March 2008, along with Incubus and The Offspring, but they cancelled their appearance and released the following statement:

Due to circumstances beyond our control, Social Distortion is regrettably unable to perform at Soundwave Festival 2008 in Australia and must officially withdraw from the bill. We apologise for any inconvenience to our Australian fans and hope to make it there as soon as possible.

During this time, the band played with various other bands, including Versus the World, Tsar, Shooter Jennings, I Hate Kate, the Black Halos, Flogging Molly, Nine Black Alps, Supersuckers, Blackpool Lights, the Lost City Angels, the Street Dogs, the Backyard Babies, the Hangmen, the Eyeliners, Cooper, the Stun Gunz, Mest, Bullets and Octane, and the Dead 60s.

In February 2006, Ness was injured and broke his wrist in a skateboarding accident. For several months, T.S.O.L. guitarist Ron Emory and the Hangmen's Bryan Small played guitar while Ness sang with his arm in a cast and sling.

Original member Brent Liles, who played bass on Mommy's Little Monster, died on January 18, 2007, after being hit by a semi truck while riding a dirt bike in Placentia, California.

Social Distortion released its first Greatest Hits compilation on June 26, 2007. It includes hit singles from Mommy's Little Monster to Sex, Love and Rock 'n' Roll, yet lacks any song from Mainliner. Along with a new studio recording of the song, "Far Behind", new studio recordings of 6 of their classic songs are included as well. Rerecording these songs allowed the band to own rights to them again, instead of Epic (their former label) owning them. Through iTunes in the U.S., as a download only, the Greatest Hits also includes a new Social Distortion cover version of the Chuck Berry classic "Maybellene". Ness stated in an interview that this Greatest Hits technically means "what was good with radio". Ness also stated in the same interview that "we may follow this up with something that is more essential Social D. – songs that are the band's favorites."

In April 2009 the band announced that longtime drummer Charlie Quintana was leaving the band:

After ten amazing years behind the drum kit for Social Distortion, Charlie "Chalo" Quintana has announced he's moving on to explore other musical opportunities. Charlie had this to say about his departure, "Playing with Social D for ten years was a good time in my life. I was lucky to play on two Social D records and the second solo album, and I am proud to have been part of the band. We hit some spectacular heights which I will never forget—adios amigos!"

Quintana's replacement was announced as Angels & Airwaves drummer Adam "Atom" Willard, formerly of Rocket from the Crypt and The Offspring.

A European tour together with the Gaslight Anthem followed in June 2009 as part of the band's 30th anniversary of underground Rock'n'Roll.

=== Hard Times and Nursery Rhymes (2009–2011) ===
In April 2008, Ness told Spinner that Social Distortion was planning an acoustic album to be released in 2009, stating "I think it could be really, really neat. It's almost like a Bob Dylan/Bruce Springsteen/Johnny Cash kind of feel with a punk edge ... but acoustic. Sometimes [the songs] are more powerful stripped down than with full volume." Ness also revealed plans for his next solo album, but he was not sure if it was going to be released before or after the follow-up to Sex, Love and Rock 'n' Roll or the acoustic album.

In July 2009, Ness revealed to Russian's Tarakany! Bad TV that Social Distortion was planning to enter the studio in December 2009 or the beginning of 2010 to begin recording a follow-up to Sex, Love and Rock 'n' Roll. In September that year, he said the album would be recorded in January 2010 at Studio 606, a studio owned by the Foo Fighters. Asked when the album was expected to be released, Ness guessed spring or summer of 2010.

On December 29, 2009, Social Distortion's official website announced the band's first South American tour in April. Ness commented, "The band and I are really looking forward to our tour of South America. From the overwhelming amount of emails we receive from our fans in South America, it's crazy to think that it's taken this long for us to come down and tour. We couldn't be more thrilled to announce that we're finally making it happen and we look forward to meeting our loyal fans in Brazil and Argentina for the first time. We hope to come home with a few new fans as well".

On February 7, 2010, Social Distortion announced on its Twitter account that it would start recording a new album on February 8.

In a February 2010 interview with Spinner, Ness revealed that the band had just tracked twelve songs, and was "going to probably track another five". He says the self-produced, still-untitled album, which he hopes to release before the end of the year, will feature the classic Social Distortion sound—a combination of punk, rockabilly and country, presumably. He explained, "It's funny—the record reminds me very much of Somewhere Between Heaven and Hell, but also I'm bringing elements of early New York '70s punk, influences that maybe haven't come out as prominently in my writing in the past. It's a little more Johnny Thunders. Some of the early first wave of punk was very blues-based rock 'n' roll, but it had this urban snottiness to it." Ness also explained what happened to the acoustic album, which was announced back in 2008, "The acoustic thing is just a future project, which I think will be significant and equally important. But as far as the priority goes, it's more important now to get a studio record out that is a regular record". While recording the album, Social Distortion announced in March 2010 that Adam Willard "...will no longer be able to continue on drums...", "...due to many foreseeable scheduling conflicts with his band Angels And Airwaves...". Fu Manchu drummer Scott Reeder filled in for Willard for the South American tour.

On April 1, 2010, it was reported on the official Social Distortion website that the band was taking a break from the studio to rehearse for their South American tour.

Social Distortion was one of the headliners at Lollapalooza 2010. Prior to this, they embarked on an East Coast tour that July and August.

On May 11, 2010, Epitaph Records officially announced that they have signed Social Distortion.

On May 20, 2010, Social Distortion updated their Twitter with this post saying, "the album is tracked... finishing up writing and getting ready to head back into the studio to record vocals." The album is said to be a return to their punk rock roots and will focus on the New York punk of the 70s and early 80s.

Social Distortion announced a full US tour in the fall of 2010 in support of their new album, supported by Frank Turner and Lucero.

As of July 2010, Scott Reeder was replaced by David Hidalgo Jr., formerly of Suicidal Tendencies.

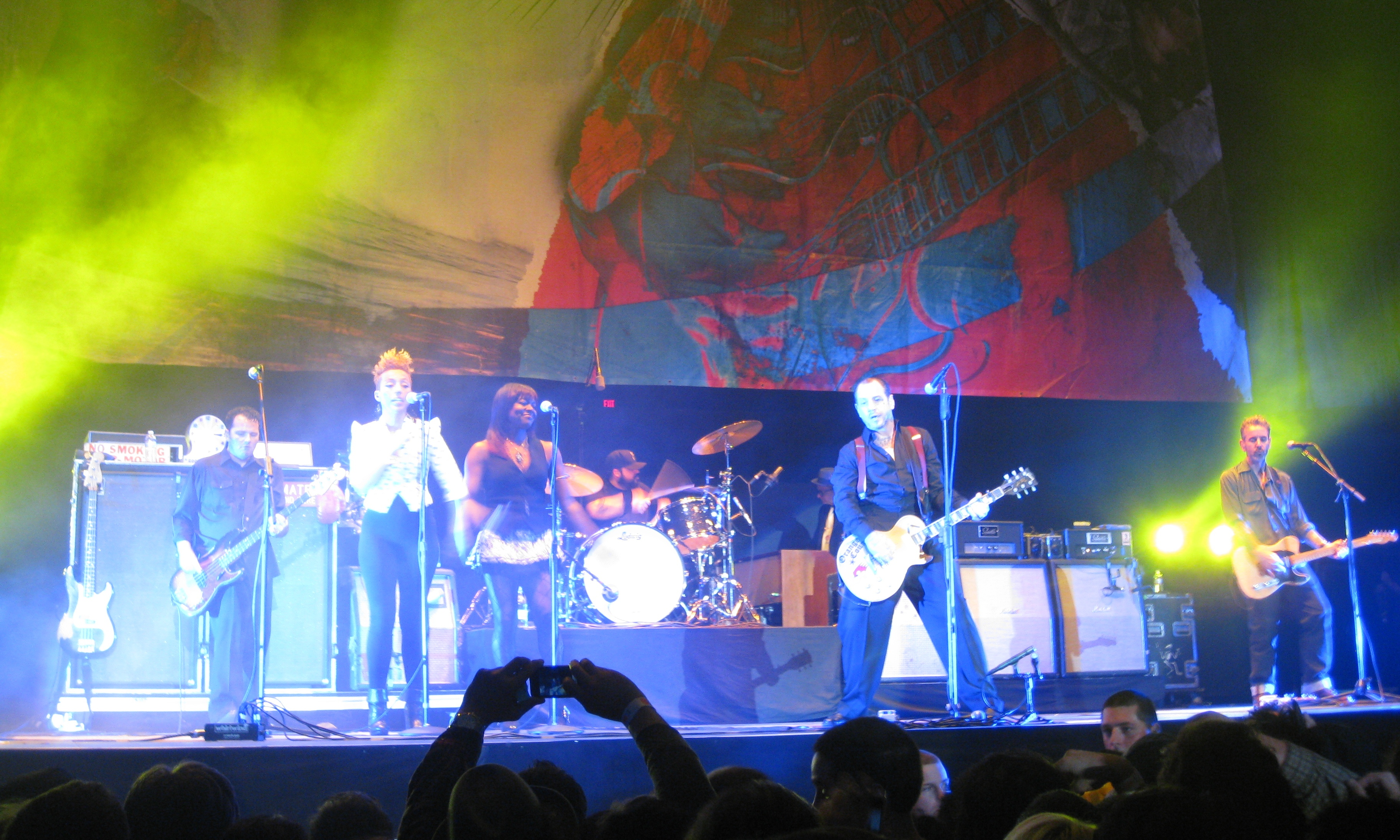
Social Distortion performing songs from Hard Times and Nursery Rhymes with backing vocalists Dessy Di Lauro (second from left) and Ijeoma Njaka (third from left)

At a show in Poughkeepsie, New York, on July 27, 2010, frontman Mike Ness revealed that the new Social Distortion album would be called Hard Times and Nursery Rhymes. Despite being planned for a November 2010 release, the band announced that the album would be released on January 18, 2011. They also mentioned that "Machine Gun Blues" would be the album's first single and available for download via iTunes on November 16. On December 6, Social Distortion made their network television debut on Jimmy Kimmel Live! performing Machine Gun Blues and Story of My Life.

Social Distortion joined the ritual at The Voodoo Experience 2011 in City Park in New Orleans, Louisiana on October 28–30, 2011.

On August 6, 2011, Social Distortion performed a live set for "Guitar Center Sessions" on DirecTV. The episode included an interview with program host, Nic Harcourt.

=== Purported future albums, health issues for Ness and Born to Kill (2011–present) ===
Asked in a January 2011 interview with Performer Magazine if Social Distortion intended to record more albums for Epitaph, Ness replied, "I would suspect so, yes." Also in a January 2011 interview with Exclaim, Mike Ness said that there would not be another seven- or eight-year wait between Social Distortion albums. Ness stated, "Although this record is out, I'm going to continue the process of writing so maybe there won't be such a large gap between records. Even when the record's done, it doesn't mean the creativity of writing is." In his interview with Frank Turner, Ness stated that his goal was to make a new Social Distortion album in two years and wanted it to be different from Hard Times and Nursery Rhymes. In an August 2011, interview at his home in Los Angeles, Ness said that he did not want "too many years to go by before the next Social D record. I'm really trying to be a little bit more disciplined. That's really what it comes down to. It's not like it takes me eight years to write a record. Once I get out of that mode, I'm out of that mode completely. Then of course, it's hard to get back and write a record. This time, when this record was finished, the creative process didn't end just because the record was done."

In May 2012, Ness stated that Social Distortion was expected to begin writing their eighth studio album in January 2013. On July 22, 2015, in an interview with Rolling Stone, Ness said he wrote songs that he forgot a few days later. He stated that the band were banking on a 2016 release date and that some songs that he considered to be filler were getting praise from his bandmates. In 2015, the band toured to celebrate the 25th anniversary of their self-titled third album.

In a March 2017 interview with Las Vegas Review-Journal, Ness revealed that the band has about 20 new songs in various stages of completion, and said that they range from garage punk to the gospel-inspired. Later that month, he said that he has been "reading and writing, and kind of wrapping my mind around the self-imposed challenge that I've put on myself: that I've got to write the record of my career. So I've got to raise the bar. That's just something that I put on myself because I don't like to just go, 'Time to put out another record' and go through the motions." He also hinted at the band entering the studio in about six months. In an interview with Phoenix New Times, which also took place in March 2017, Ness stated that his goal was to be in the studio by fall, and added, "I have to write the record of my career right now. That's the pressure I put on myself." In a June 2018 interview with Edmonton Journal, Ness said, "I've put a few new songs in the set just to let people know that we're not sitting on our asses at home. It gets people talking, which is nice. But yeah, once we stop touring in November, we'll be ready. I'm thinking that by January we'll be pre-production, but I don't want to rush something out just to get it out." In an interview with The Orange County Register in November 2022, Ness mentioned that, with over 40–50 songs written, Social Distortion has been working on two new albums, with the first to be released in 2023 and the second to be recorded a year later, and added, "That would make people faint. I want to do that, though. I'm going to try to do that. I want to shock people."

Social Distortion toured Europe from May to July 2022. On April 7, 2023, Ness and Social Distortion posted to their Instagram pages that pre production on the band's next album was completed and that they would begin recording it on April 17 for an early 2024 release.

On June 7, 2023, Mike Ness announced that he was diagnosed with stage one tonsil cancer and is expected to make a full recovery from surgery. The band's upcoming tour was postponed as was work on their upcoming studio album. Ness said of the album's delay: "While it will take a little longer, I promise you that it will be delivered and it will exceed your expectations".

On December 12, 2023, Social Distortion announced that they would be doing a co-headlining tour with Bad Religion in April and May 2024 which saw the band perform Mommy's Little Monster in its entirety to celebrate the album's belated 40th anniversary. Social Distortion will also do their own headlining tour in September and October 2024.

When asked in the May 2024 issue of Guitar World about the status of his health and Social Distortion's upcoming plans, Ness said, "I was halfway through recording the next album when I got cancer, so that's had to go on hold while I've been working on getting better. I had rough guide vocals laid down, and when I listen to the tracks I think they're some of my best work, so I'm looking forward to finishing the album. It's going to be a really great record. I'm going on the road in the spring, which will be the first time I've sung live since the cancer on my tonsils. I've been doing my therapy and working hard. There's a lot of pressure knowing that I've got shows booked, but it's a good pressure as it puts a lot of focus on my efforts. I guess the album won't be finished until I complete the tour, by which time I hope my voice will be back to full strength, which means the record probably won't be out until 2025. It seems a long way off, but it will be well worth the wait." On September 11, 2025, Ness responded to a social media post by a fan asking when we could see the new album being released. Ness responded by saying "Look for a sneak single in October". On November 5, 2025, Ness gave an update in a video post on Instagram saying that the first single would be released in January 2026 with the new album expected in the spring of 2026. He said the reason the single was not released as expected in October was due to the band being unable to finish it on time.

On February 23, 2026, Social Distortion posted a short video to their social media pages of Mike Ness walking down the street kicking a can and then looking up at an image of the band's logo along with the image of a tiger with the words Born to Kill, the title of the band's long awaited eighth album, their first in fifteen years, which was released through Epitaph Records on May 8, 2026, with the title track being released as the first single on February 25, 2026. On February 24, 2026, the band confirmed an August–October 2026 tour with Descendents and The Chats serving as the opening acts. They are also confirmed to be performing at the Hellfest music festival being held in Clisson in June 2026.

== Logo ==
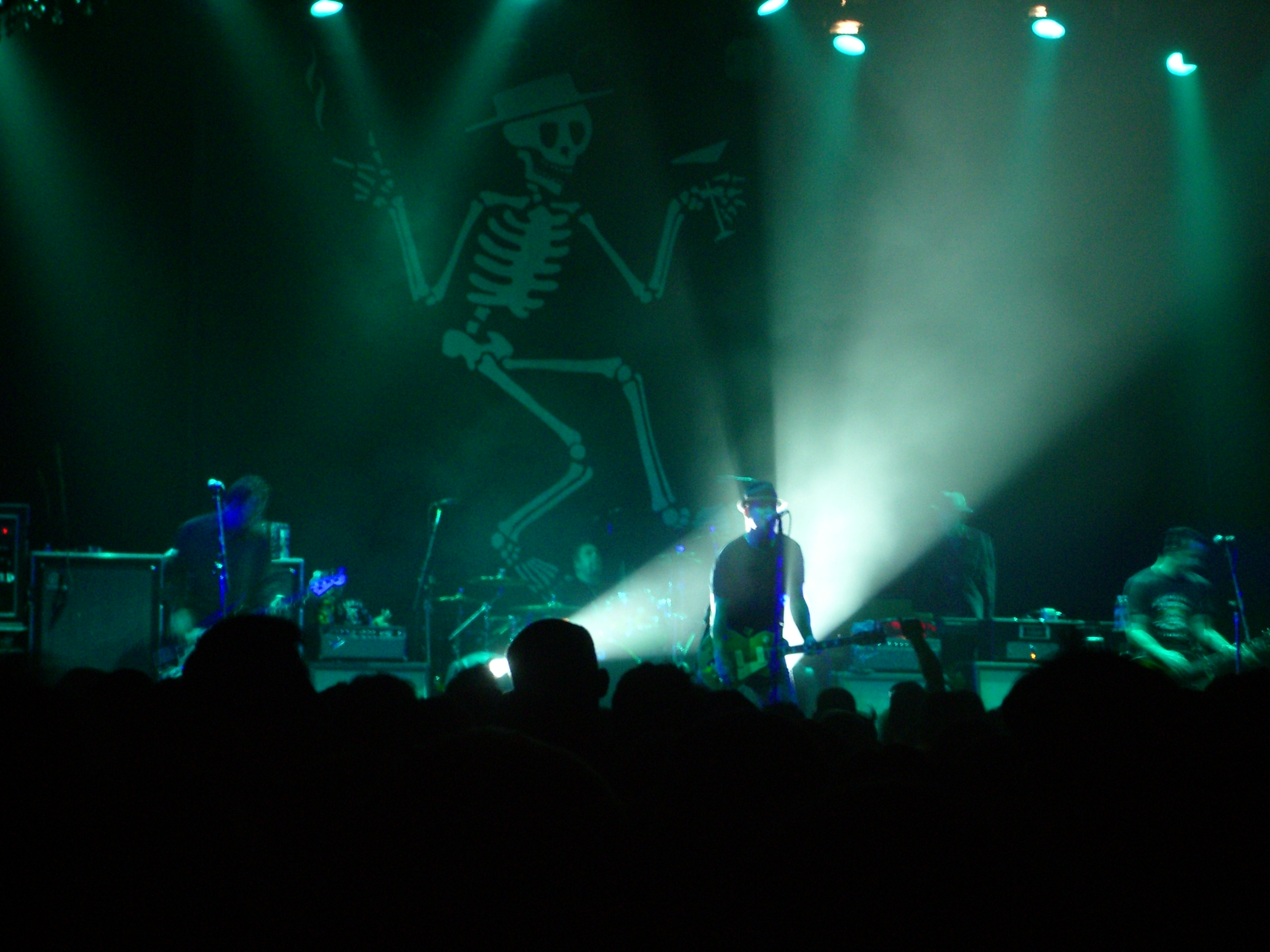
The band's skeleton logo on a banner during a live show

The band has consistently used as their logo a skeleton holding a cigarette and a martini glass. It was designed by Mackie Osborne, wife of Melvins frontman Buzz Osborne, as part of an invitation to a New Year's Eve party. It is frequently featured in live performances as well as album covers. Said Ness in an April 2011 interview with Rolling Stone: "At the time, I saw that, and it just felt like, 'That's it right there. It's life and death, it's celebration.' It just felt powerful."

== Musical style, influences, and legacy ==
Social Distortion has been described as punk rock, cowpunk, rock and roll, roots rock, alternative rock and melodic hardcore, while their early work has been characterized as hardcore punk. They are thought to be one of the pioneering bands of the original Southern California punk rock movement out of Orange County in the late 1970s, and their style closely associated with the Adolescents, Agent Orange, the Germs, and other bands from that place and time. In the mid-'80s there was a notable change in their style of music—taking more from country music and rock 'n' roll. Mike Ness admits in the DVD commentary from Another State of Mind that he may have even tried too hard on the Prison Bound album. They did eventually find their niche, and the majority of their albums from the mid-80s on to the early '90s featured a melodic punk sound that is distinctly—and distinctively—their own.

Social Distortion's music is influenced by bands and artists such as Johnny Cash, Hank Williams, Bob Dylan, Eddie Cochran, the Rolling Stones, Sex Pistols, the Clash, New York Dolls, Dead Boys, and the Ramones. Social Distortion have influenced bands such as Pennywise, Face to Face, Avenged Sevenfold, Rise Against, Black Veil Brides, Pearl Jam, Rancid, the Offspring, Volbeat and Thrice. The band began playing with fellow Orange County, California, bands such as the Adolescents, China White, Shattered Faith and T.S.O.L. The music was fast, angry and energetic.

All of Social Distortion's songs are written and sung by Mike Ness. There is a common theme in most of his lyrics about "impulsiveness, its consequences and the hard struggle to overcome".

== Members ==
Current members

- Mike Ness – lead vocals, lead guitar (1978–present)
- Jonny "2 Bags" Wickersham – rhythm guitar, backing vocals (2000–present)
- Brent Harding – bass, backing vocals (2005–present)
- David Hidalgo Jr. – drums, percussion (2010–present)

Current touring musicians

- David Kalish – keyboards, organ (2011–present)

== Discography ==
- Mommy's Little Monster (1983)
- Prison Bound (1988)
- Social Distortion (1990)
- Somewhere Between Heaven and Hell (1992)
- White Light, White Heat, White Trash (1996)
- Sex, Love and Rock 'n' Roll (2004)
- Hard Times and Nursery Rhymes (2011)
- Born to Kill (2026)
