= Charlie Quintana =

American drummer (1962–2018)

- Birth name: Gonzalo Quintana III
- Also known as: Chalo Quintana, Chalo
- Born: January 29, 1962; El Paso, Texas
- Died: March 12, 2018 (aged 56); Cancún, Mexico
- Genres: rock, punk
- Occupation: Drummer
- Formerly of: The Plugz, Cruzados, The Havalinas, Izzy Stradlin & the Ju Ju Hounds, Cracker, Social Distortion

Gonzalo Quintana III (January 29, 1962 – March 12, 2018), also known as Charlie Quintana or Chalo, was an American rock and punk drummer. He is best known as a founding member of the band The Plugz and as the drummer for the punk rock band Social Distortion from 2000 to 2009.

== Career ==
Quintana was born in El Paso, Texas. He was a member of 1970s punk band The Plugz (which became a popular roots band in the 1980s), Cruzados, The Havalinas, Izzy Stradlin & the Ju Ju Hounds, and toured and/or recorded with Joan Osborne, John Doe, Cracker, Bob Dylan, Mark Curry, Jimmy and the Mustangs, 47C and many others. He was briefly a member of Agent Orange, appearing on their 1996 album Virtually Indestructible. Quintana toured with Social Distortion member Mike Ness's solo band and recorded with him on his second solo offering Under the Influences (1999).

Quintana joined Social Distortion in 2000 as the replacement for Chuck Biscuits (of D.O.A. and Danzig), and following the death of the band's guitarist Dennis Danell. He was present on Social Distortion's critically acclaimed comeback Sex, Love and Rock 'n' Roll (2004), and their 2007 Greatest Hits compilation. In April 2009, Quintana left Social Distortion to explore other musical opportunities, and to spend more time with his family. He was replaced by session drummer Josh Freese, who appeared on the next Social Distortion album, Hard Times and Nursery Rhymes in 2011. Shortly after the album was released, David Hidalgo, Jr. became the band's new drummer.

== Death ==
Quintana died of a heart attack on March 12, 2018, at the age of 56 at his home in Cancún.
