= Ring of Fire (song) =

Song popularized by Johnny Cash

- Picture sleeve for the 1963 U.S. vinyl single

Single by Johnny Cash

from the album Ring of Fire: The Best of Johnny Cash
- B-side: "I'd Still Be There"
- Released: April 19, 1963
- Recorded: March 25, 1963
- Studio: Columbia (Nashville, Tennessee)
- Genre: Country
- Length: 2:38
- Label: Columbia Nashville
- Songwriters: June Carter; Merle Kilgore
- Producers: Don Law; Frank Jones

Johnny Cash singles chronology
"Busted" (1962)	"Ring of Fire" (1963)	"The Matador" (1963)

"Ring of Fire"

Single by Eric Burdon & the Animals

from the album Love Is
- B-side: "I'm an Animal"
- Released: 1969
- Genre: Psychedelic rock; hard rock
- Length: 4:58 (album version)
- Label: MGM
- Songwriters: June Carter; Merle Kilgore
- Producer: Tom Wilson

Eric Burdon & the Animals singles chronology
"White Houses" (1968)	"Ring of Fire" (1969)	"River Deep Mountain High" (1969)

"Ring of Fire"

Single by Alan Jackson

from the album 34 Number Ones
- Released: 23 October 2010
- Recorded: 2010
- Genre: Country
- Length: 3:12
- Label: Sony Music Entertainment
- Songwriters: June Carter; Merle Kilgore
- Producer: Keith Stegall

Alan Jackson singles chronology
"Hard Hat and a Hammer" (2010)	"Ring of Fire" (2010)	"Long Way to Go" (2011)

"Ring of Fire (1988 version)"

Single by Johnny Cash

from the album Classic Cash: Hall of Fame Series
- A-side: "Get Rhythm"
- Released: September 19, 1988
- Recorded: October 1987
- Genre: Country; rock and roll
- Length: 2:44
- Label: Mercury
- Songwriters: June Carter; Merle Kilgore
- Producer: Johnny Cash

Johnny Cash singles chronology
"I Walk the Line" (1987)	"Ring of Fire (1988 version)" (1988)	"Ballad of Ira Hayes" (1988)

"Ring of Fire" is a song written by the American singer-songwriters June Carter and Merle Kilgore. It was originally recorded as "(Love's) Ring of Fire" by June's sister, Anita Carter, on her 1962 album Folk Songs Old and New. It was popularized by Carter's future husband, the country singer Johnny Cash, after it appeared on his 1963 compilation album Ring of Fire: The Best of Johnny Cash.

Cash's version became one of his biggest hits, staying at No. 1 on the country chart for seven weeks. It was certified gold by the RIAA on January 21, 2010, and by September of that year had amassed over 1.2 million paid downloads. It was named the fourth-greatest country song by Country Music Television, while Rolling Stone called it the greatest country song and the 87th-greatest song of all time. In 1999, Cash's version was inducted into the Grammy Hall of Fame.

== Description ==
The lyrics compare the passions of love to a "ring of fire". The narrator describes being burned, and the flames rising, as he continues falling a long distance ("down, down, down"), using the vocabulary of "falling in love". The song concludes without resolution.

== Background ==
"Ring of Fire" excerpt
From the album Ring of Fire: The Best of Johnny Cash. This sample a portion of the chorus. Flourishes from the mariachi are also featured.

Some sources claim that June Carter had seen the words "Love is like a burning ring of fire" underlined in an Elizabethan poetry book owned by her uncle A. P. Carter. She worked with Merle Kilgore on writing a song inspired by this imagery, as she had seen her uncle do in the past. In her words: "There is no way to be in that kind of hell, no way to extinguish a flame that burns, burns, burns".

The song was originally recorded by June's sister, Anita Carter, on her Mercury Records album Folk Songs Old and New (1963) as "(Love's) Ring of Fire". Mercury released Anita's version as a single and it was a featured "pick hit" in Billboard magazine. After hearing Anita's version, Johnny Cash claimed he had a dream where he heard the song accompanied by "Mexican horns". The mariachi horn sound had recently been popularized on American radio with 1962 hit song "The Lonely Bull" by Herb Alpert. Cash said, "[...] I'll give you about five or six more months, and if you don't hit with it, I'm gonna record it the way I feel it." Cash noted that adding trumpets was a change to his basic sound.

When the song failed to become a major hit for Anita, Cash recorded it his own way, adding the mariachi-style horns from his dream. This sound was later used in the song "It Ain't Me Babe", which was recorded around the same time. Mother Maybelle and the Carter Sisters are prominently featured in the Cash recording singing harmony. Cash tinkered with a few of the original phrases in Anita Carter's version of the song. Cash's daughter Rosanne said, "The song is about the transformative power of love and that's what it has always meant to me and that's what it will always mean to the Cash children."

== Other accounts and uses ==
In 2004, Merle Kilgore, who shared writing credit for the song with June Carter, proposed licensing the song for a hemorrhoid cream commercial. When performing the song live, Kilgore would often "mock dedicate" the song to the "makers of Preparation H". However, June's heirs were not of a like mind, and they refused to allow the song to be licensed for the ad.

In her 2007 autobiography, Cash's first wife, Vivian, wrote: "One day in early 1963, while gardening in the yard, Johnny told me about a song he had just written with Merle Kilgore and Curly [Lewis] while out fishing on Lake Casitas. 'I'm gonna give June half credit on a song I just wrote,' Johnny said. 'It's called "Ring of Fire."' 'Why?' I asked, wiping dirt from my hands. The mere mention of her name annoyed me. I was sick of hearing about her. 'She needs the money,' he said, avoiding my stare. 'And I feel sorry for her.'" Vivian also noted: "To this day, it confounds me to hear the elaborate details June told of writing that song for Johnny. She didn't write that song any more than I did. The truth is, Johnny wrote that song, while pilled up and drunk, about a certain private female body part. All those years of her claiming she wrote it herself, and she probably never knew what the song was really about."

== Chart performance ==
=== Johnny Cash version ===
Chart (1963–1968)	Peak position
U.S. Billboard Hot Country Singles	1
U.S. Billboard Hot 100	17
Canada CHUM	12
German Singles Chart	27
Swiss Singles Chart	77

=== Eric Burdon and the Animals version ===
Chart (1969)	Peak position
Australian Single Chart	10
Dutch Charts	4
German Singles Chart	24
South Africa (Springbok)	6
UK Singles Chart	35

=== Sandy Kelly & Johnny Cash version ===
Chart (1990)	Peak position
Ireland (IRMA)	21

=== Social Distortion version ===
Chart (1990)	Peak position
US Alternative Airplay (Billboard)	25

=== Alan Jackson version ===
Chart (2010)	Peak position
US Hot Country Songs (Billboard)	45

=== Wuki version ===
==== Weekly charts ====
Weekly chart performance
Chart (2025)	Peak position
Lithuania Airplay (TopHit)	19
Kazakhstan Airplay (TopHit)	80

==== Monthly charts ====
Monthly chart performance
Chart (2025)	Peak position
Lithuania Airplay (TopHit)	26

== Certifications ==
Region	Certification	Certified units/sales
United Kingdom (BPI)	Platinum	600,000^{‡}
United States (RIAA) Mastertone	Gold	500,000^{*}
^{*} Sales figures based on certification alone.^{‡} Sales+streaming figures based on certification alone.

== Legacy ==
Numerous cover versions of "Ring of Fire" have been produced, the most commercially successful version being by Eric Burdon & the Animals on their 1968 album Love Is. Their version was recorded at the end of 1968, and made the top 40 in four countries. In 1970, Ray Charles released a version on his album Love Country Style. In late 1974, the Eric Burdon Band released a hard rock version for their album Sun Secrets. Wall of Voodoo debuted with a cover of the song on their self-titled 1980 EP and featured a pulsing synthesizer. A rock version by Blondie appears in the 1980 film Roadie. Dwight Yoakam covered it on his 1986 debut album Guitars, Cadillacs, Etc., Etc. Punk rock band Social Distortion covered it on their 1990 self-titled LP. In 1991, Frank Zappa released a reggae-style live version on the album The Best Band You Never Heard in Your Life, after claiming to have met Johnny Cash in the elevator before the show and inviting him to perform the song with his band that night. Cash did not follow through on the invitation, but the band played the song anyway. A cover of the song by Alan Jackson with guest vocals from Lee Ann Womack was released as a single on December 6, 2010. It served as the lead-off single to his 34 Number Ones compilation album, and peaked at #45 in the Hot Country Songs, becoming his first single to miss the top 40 since "Just Put a Ribbon in Your Hair" peaked at #51 in 2004. It was his last single released by Arista Records. The ska band Swim Herschel Swim covered the song on their 1994 album Burn Swim Burn. The English power metal band DragonForce recorded a cover as the closing track to the standard edition of their 2014 album, Maximum Overload. The Swedish rockabilly band The Go Getters recorded a cover on their 2017 album Love And Hate.

Cash's version of "Ring of Fire" was never released as a single in the UK. However, in 1993 and 1994, it gained significant radio airplay in the UK after it was used in a popular television commercial for Levi's. In 2005, Liverpool FC fans began singing the song at matches during the run-up to that year's Champions League Final, and it has been a staple song for the team's fans ever since.

Wall of Voodoo's cover version was featured in the 1981 avant-garde pornographic film Nightdreams.

Since 2004, the Calgary Flames of the NHL have used the song as a victory song after every home win.
