= Dennis Danell =

American guitarist (1961–2000)

- Born: Dennis Eric Danell; June 24, 1961
- Origin: Seattle, Washington, U.S.
- Died: February 29, 2000 (aged 38) Newport Beach, California, U.S.
- Genres: Punk rock, punk blues, cowpunk, alternative rock
- Occupation: Musician
- Instruments: Guitar, bass
- Years active: 1979–2000
- Formerly of: Social Distortion

Dennis Eric Danell (June 24, 1961 – February 29, 2000) was an American guitarist and a founding member of the Southern California punk rock band Social Distortion.

== Biography ==
Danell joined Social Distortion in 1979; he and frontman Mike Ness attended Troy High School (Fullerton, CA) together. Mike recruited him to play guitar despite his not yet knowing how to play an instrument. Two bandmates, Casey Royer and Rikk Agnew, quit, not wanting to wait for him to learn. When Social Distortion recorded its first single in 1981, "Mainline/Playpen", Danell played bass, choosing this because it was "easier to play. I only had to hit single notes rather than forming chords". Shortly after this brief bass stint, Ness taught him how to play guitar and Danell switched instruments. His steady, melodic playing helped define the group's signature jangle on such albums as Mommy's Little Monster (1983), Prison Bound (1988), Social Distortion (1990), Somewhere Between Heaven and Hell (1992) and White Light, White Heat, White Trash (1996).

After Social Distortion went on hiatus following the release of Live at the Roxy in 1998, Danell produced numerous local bands at the group's recording studio, Casbah, in Fullerton, California. His production credits included Fanmail (BEC Records), Value Pac (Four Door Entertainment), Fraidy Cats (Bulletproof Records), the Deluxtone Rockets (Tooth & Nail Records), and Rock Star Barbecue, the debut artist on Danell's new independent label, Masterpiece Records. By 2000, Danell was quickly becoming a much sought-after producer in the Orange County area.

Danell also started a new side band called Strung Gurus, with Michael Knott of the Orange County band Aunt Betty's (formerly on Elektra). Danell produced, co-wrote and played guitar for them while working on their first full-length album. The Strung Gurus debut, to be the second release on Masterpiece Records, was nearly completed.

== Death ==
Danell remained the guitarist for Social Distortion until his death on February 29, 2000, Danell, aged 38, was at his Newport Beach, California home when he suddenly died in the driveway during a move to a new residence. The band's longtime manager reported that Danell died of cerebral aneurysm. According to other sources, the Orange County Coroner's Office lists his death as "Idiopathic Dilated Cardiomyopathy." Mike Ness stated on the DVD commentary of Another State of Mind that Danell died from a heart condition.

In May 2000, several stalwart Southern California punk bands performed a benefit concert for Danell's family at the Irvine Meadows Amphitheatre. The Offspring, X, TSOL, and Pennywise appeared, and Social Distortion performed with new member Johnny 2 Bags from Cadillac Tramps stepping in for Dennis.
