= Sunny Day Real Estate discography =

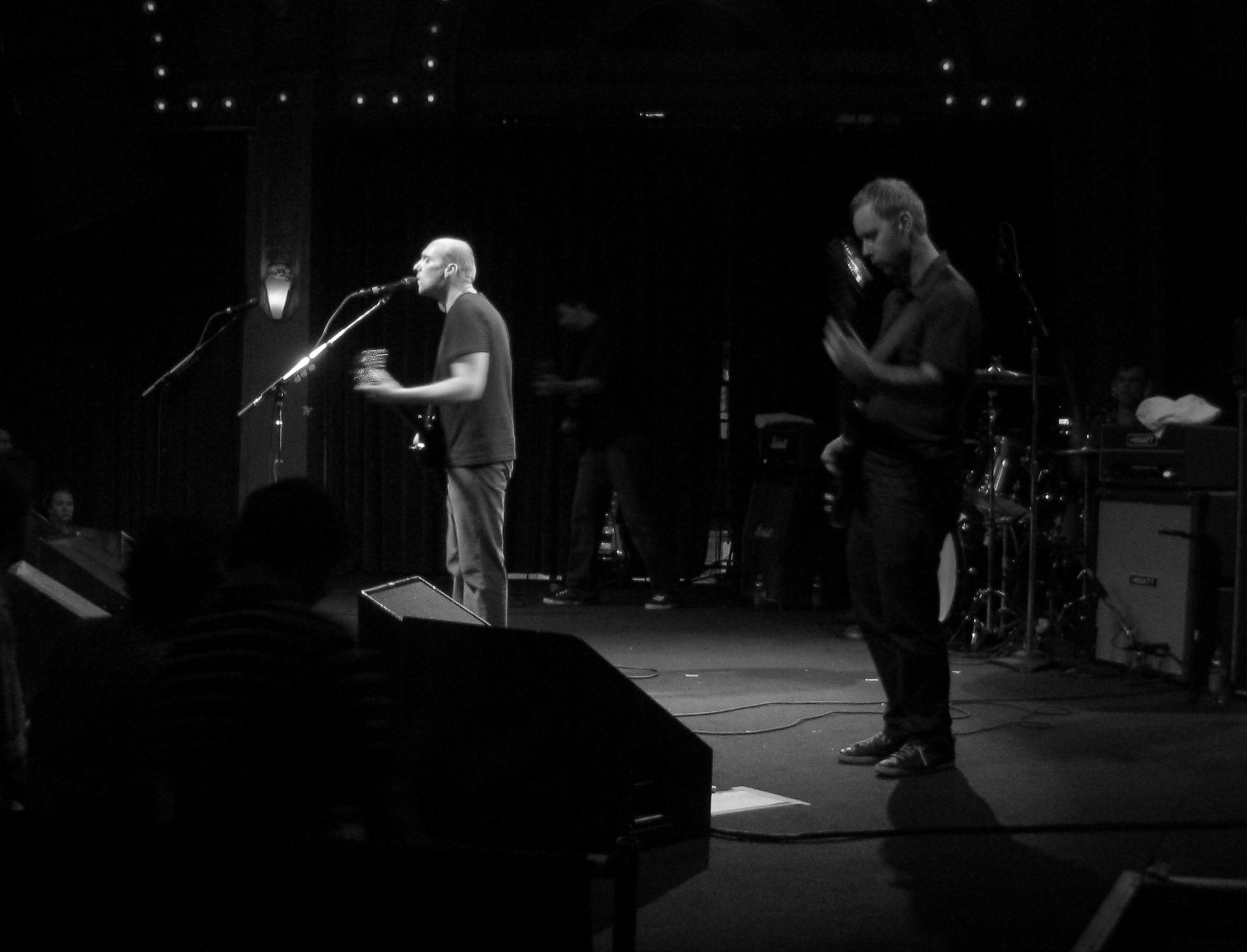
- Studio albums: 4
- Extended plays: 1
- Soundtrack albums: 1
- Live albums: 2
- Compilation albums: 2
- Singles: 8
- B-sides: 3
- Video albums: 1
- Music videos: 2
- Splits: 2
- Demo albums: 4
- Tributes to the band: 1
- Other promos: 3

The discography of Sunny Day Real Estate, a Seattle rock band.

During their first period between 1992 and 1995, they released two studio albums and five singles. A reunion in 1997 saw the band put out two more studio albums, a live album and another single, before their second breakup in 2001.

Following another reunion tour in 2009, the band began work on their fifth album. It was later announced in 2013 that work on this album had fallen through and that the group had again disbanded. Only one song would be released from these final sessions.

== Albums ==
=== Studio albums ===
List of studio albums, with selected details and peak chart positions
Title	Album details	Peak chart positions	
Title	Album details	Billboard 200	Heatseekers
Diary	Release date: May 10, 1994; Label: Sub Pop	—	—
Sunny Day Real Estate	Release date: November 7, 1995; Label: Sub Pop	—	25
How It Feels to Be Something On	Release date: September 8, 1998; Label: Sub Pop	132	3
The Rising Tide	Release date: June 20, 2000; Label: Time Bomb	97	—

=== Live albums ===
List of live albums, with selected details and peak chart positions
Title	Album details	Peak chart positions
Title	Album details	Heatseekers
Live	Release date: October 19, 1999; Label: Sub Pop	37
Diary – Live at London Bridge Studio	Release date: May 3, 2024; Label: self-released	—

=== Video albums ===
List of video albums, with selected details
Title	Album details
Live	Release date: October 19, 1999; Label: Sub Pop

=== Demo albums ===
List of demo albums, with selected details
Title	Album details
Empty Set Demo Tape	Release date: 1992; Label: One Day I Stopped Breathing; Format: CS
Sunny Day Real Estate Demo Tape	Release date: 1992; Label: One Day I Stopped Breathing; Format: CS

=== Tribute albums ===
- The Covers Were the Stairs (2006)
- 20 Jahre Intro Magazine – Part 6: Emo (2011, Ltd. Edition 7" Picture Vinyl, German band Adolar covering "Song About an Angel")

== Extended plays ==
List of EPs, with selected details
Title	EP details
In Circles	Release date: 1994; Label: Sub Pop; Format: CD

== Songs ==
=== Singles ===
List of singles
Year	Title	Record label	Format
1993	"Flatland Spider"	One Day I Stopped Breathing	7"
1993	"Thief Steal Me a Peach"	One Day I Stopped Breathing	7"
1994	"Seven"	Sub Pop	CD
1994	"Friday"	Bacteria Sour	7"
1998	"How It Feels to Be Something On/Bucket of Chicken"	Sub Pop	7"
1998	"Pillars"	Sub Pop	7"/CD
2000	"One"	Time Bomb	CD
2024	"Novum Vetus"	self-released	Digital
2024	"Grendel"	self-released	Digital

=== Compilation appearances ===
Year	Title	Songs featured	Record label
1994	Ada 4th Quarter Sampler 94	"In Circles"	Alternative Distribution Alliance
1995	That Virtua Feeling: Sega and Sub-Pop Get Together	"Theo B"	Sub Pop
1995	Batman Forever Soundtrack	"8"	WEA/Atlantic
1998	The Best of Request – Volume 6	"100 Million"	Request Media
2000	Time Bomb Recordings Sampler 2000	"One" "Faces in Disguise"	Time Bomb Recordings

=== B-sides ===
Year	A-side	Song	Comments
1993	"Flatland Spider"	"The Onlies"	
1993	"8" (on Thief Steal Me a Peach)	"9"	Also released on the In Circles EP
1995	"Friday"	"Spade and Parade"	
1998	"How It Feels to Be Something On"	"Bucket of Chicken"	Unused contribution to The Crow: City of Angels soundtrack

=== Songs re-recorded for albums ===
Title	Original version release	Original version release date	Album re-recorded for	Album release date
"8"	Thief Steal Me a Peach 7"	1993	Sunny Day Real Estate	1995
"48"	In Circles EP	1994	Diary	1994
"Friday"	Friday 7"	1994	Sunny Day Real Estate	1995

== Music videos ==
Year	Title	Album
1994	"Seven"	Diary
1994	"In Circles"	Diary

== Splits ==
Year	Split With	Song featured	Record label
1994	Shudder to Think	"In Circles"	Sub Pop
2014	Circa Survive	"Lipton Witch"	
