= William Goldsmith =

American musician (born 1972)

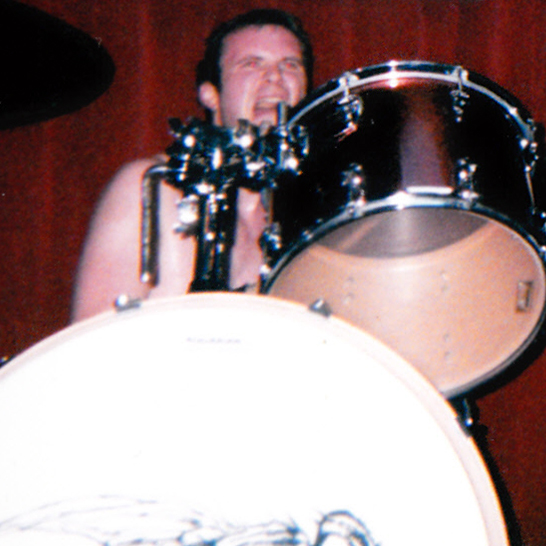
- Goldsmith performing in 2000

Background information
- Born: July 4, 1972 (age 54); Seattle, Washington, US
- Genre: Alternative rock
- Occupation: Musician
- Instruments: Drums, percussion
- Years active: 1992–present
- Labels: Sub Pop, Time Bomb Recordings, Roswell/Capitol
- Member of: Sunny Day Real Estate
- Formerly of: The Fire Theft, Foo Fighters

William Goldsmith (born July 4, 1972) is an American drummer who is a member of Sunny Day Real Estate and Assertion, and a member of Foo Fighters between 1994 and 1997.

He has toured with Mike Watt and IQU, and played live with several bands and artists.

== Early years ==
Goldsmith was born in Seattle, Washington to Hugh and Skitty Goldsmith, both of whom are Jewish. He began playing drums as a child, after being introduced by his older brother to bands such as The Beatles, Led Zeppelin, Elvis Costello and the Attractions, and Talking Heads. Goldsmith has stated that he wanted to be John Lennon, but also a drummer, and has cited Keith Moon of The Who as his biggest influence on the instrument. During fifth grade, Goldsmith formed his first band, Screaming Hormones. In high school, Goldsmith formed a duo called the 13 with John Atkins, and later formed the hardcore punk band Reason for Hate with his friend Jeremy Enigk, whom he had previously invited to be the bassist for the 13. After Goldsmith graduated from high school, Greg Williamson invited him to the band Positive Greed. Afterwards Goldsmith worked on many ensembles, at times being a member of four bands simultaneously. He also expanded his tastes in music, becoming a fan of post-hardcore bands such as Fugazi, and of Nirvana's debut album Bleach.

== Career ==
=== Sunny Day Real Estate (1992–1995) ===
In 1992, Goldsmith was invited by bassist Nate Mendel and singer-guitarist Dan Hoerner to play with their band. Despite being a part of many projects, Goldsmith accepted due to their tenacity and strong focus. The band went through many names, such as Empty Set, Chewbacca Kaboom and One Day I Stopped Breathing, before settling down on Sunny Day Real Estate. Afterwards the trio recorded a single, Flatland Spider.

As Mendel left temporarily to tour with another band, Goldsmith invited Enigk to jam with him and Hoerner. Enigk was then added to the band, and soon became their new frontman. They recorded two studio albums, both released on the well-known independent label Sub Pop, that were greeted with positive critical reviews and brought about newfound popularity for the emo genre before they disbanded in 1995.

=== Foo Fighters (1994–1997) ===
During one of Sunny Day Real Estate's last concerts, former Nirvana member Dave Grohl left the band a note. Goldsmith called him back, and Grohl invited both Goldsmith and Mendel to join his new band, Foo Fighters, along with former Germs and touring Nirvana guitarist Pat Smear, during late October 1994. In 1995, they embarked on a club tour supporting Mike Watt along with Eddie Vedder's side project Hovercraft. Afterwards, the band's already recorded debut album – on which Grohl had recorded nearly all instruments by himself – was released. Goldsmith stated that while he enjoyed the smaller venues, "pretty much everything after that blew," saying that as the band got bigger "it turned into a world-domination thing that became really creatively stifling" and he grew tired of reproducing songs he had no input composing. Goldsmith also developed carpal tunnel syndrome after the tour.

After touring through the spring of 1996, the full lineup entered a Seattle studio with producer Gil Norton to record the band's second album. It was an arduous and mostly frustrating process for Goldsmith due to Grohl's perfectionism, which led to the drummer performing his tracks over and over. "Dave had me do 96 takes of one song, and I had to do thirteen hours' worth of takes on another one. It just seemed that everything I did wasn't good enough for him, or anyone else." With the sessions nearly complete, the band took a break. According to Grohl, Goldsmith's drumming had good moments but for the most part his performances did not meet Grohl's standards. The band regrouped in Los Angeles in February 1997 and practically re-recorded the album—this time with Grohl on drums—without informing Goldsmith about the overdub session. Goldsmith only later learned from Mendel that his contribution was being replaced. Feeling betrayed and unhappy with Grohl's suggestion that he continue on as the band's touring drummer only, Goldsmith decided to leave. He was replaced by Taylor Hawkins and the finished album, The Colour and the Shape, was released on May 20, 1997.

=== Back with Sunny Day Real Estate (1997–2001) ===
In 1997, Sub Pop had approached Hoerner and Enigk about releasing a compilation of Sunny Day Real Estate rarities. Instead, the band decided to reunite and release a new studio album, 1998's How It Feels To Be Something On. While Goldsmith, who had by this time left Foo Fighters, took part in the reunion, Mendel remained with Foo Fighters. Goldsmith also drummed with Sunny Day Real Estate on their subsequent live album, which was their last recording for Sub Pop, and their 2000 studio album The Rising Tide (for Time Bomb Recordings). After completing an extensive tour of the United States, the band hoped to tour Europe for the first time, but Time Bomb could not afford to support such a tour; the label soon ceased operations, resulting in the band's 2001 breakup.

=== After Sunny Day Real Estate, other projects, and reunion (2001–present) ===
After Sunny Day Real Estate disbanded for a second time, Goldsmith and Enigk formed The Fire Theft with original Sunny Day bassist Nate Mendel. An album and tour followed.

Around the same time, Goldsmith joined guitarist Billy Dolan, who had played on the Fire Theft album and tour, for a project called Varicocele. The band recorded about 30 songs, and presented them to Jonathan Poneman at Sub Pop, who declined to release them.

In 2008, Goldsmith formed Brawley Banks with Justin Schwartz and Jorum Young from Cobra High. In 2009 they played their first show.

In June 2009, it was confirmed that Sunny Day Real Estate would be reuniting once again with the original line-up. A tour began later that year. In early 2010, guitarist Dan Hoerner stated that a new album is in the works.

In December 2018, Goldsmith claimed on his Facebook page that the unfinished fifth Sunny Day Real Estate album remained "silenced, abandoned and buried within the murkiest depths of David Grohl's sock drawer." He would later clarify that he was referring to the Grohl-owned Studio 606 where the album sessions took place and were abandoned due to Jeremy Enigk not receiving "the moral support as well as engineering that he deserved."

In 2020, Goldsmith's new band Assertion signed to Spartan Records who released their debut album 'Intermission' on April 9, 2021. The album was praised by outlets like Rolling Stone, who named it "One of the Best Albums of 2021 So Far" on June 11, 2021.

== Equipment ==
During the bulk of his time with Sunny Day Real Estate and Foo Fighters, William played an Ayotte drum kit with Zildjian cymbals. His exact setup was as follows:

=== Drums ===
- 14 in × 7 in (360 mm × 180 mm) SteelHoop Snare Drum
- 15 in × 14 in (380 mm × 360 mm) Tom Tom
- 18 in × 16 in (460 mm × 410 mm) Floor Tom
- 24 in × 20 in (610 mm × 510 mm) Bass Drum

=== Cymbals ===
- 15 in (380 mm) Zildjian K Custom Hi-Hats
- 22 in (560 mm) Zildjian K Light Ride
- 22 in (560 mm) Zildjian K Custom Dark Ride
- 24 in (610 mm) Zildjian A Medium Ride

He has also played with DW, Yamaha, Pearl, Craviotto, Slingerland, and Vistalite kits.

During the Fire Theft tour, he played with a massive 30 in (760 mm) Zildjian K ride.

== Discography ==
Sunny Day Real Estate

- Diary (1994)
- Sunny Day Real Estate (1995) (also known as LP2 or The Pink Album)
- How It Feels to Be Something On (1998)
- Live (1999)
- The Rising Tide (2000)

Jeremy Enigk

- Return of the Frog Queen (1996) (plays drums on "Abegail Anne")

Foo Fighters

- The Colour and the Shape (1997) – (plays drums on "Doll", "Up in Arms" (credited only for slow intro), “The Colour and the Shape”, "Down in the Park" (10th Anniversary Edition))

Mary Lou Lord

- Got No Shadow (1998) (plays drums on "Subway")

Replikants

- Slickaphonics (1999)

The Fire Theft

- The Fire Theft (2003)

Assertion

- Intermission (2021)
- Basking In The Gaslight (2025)
