= Nate Mendel =

American bassist (born 1968)

Nate ‍Mendel
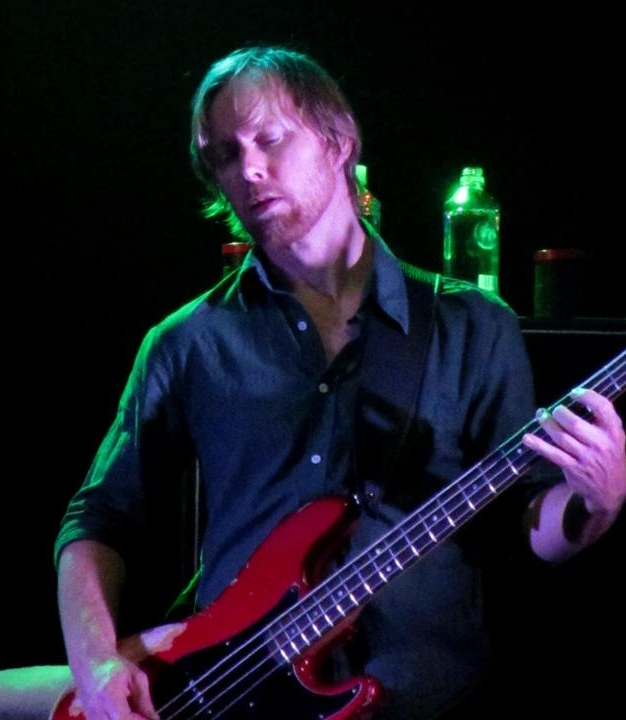
- Mendel with the Foo Fighters in 2011

Background information
- Born: Nathan Gregor Mendel; December 2, 1968 (age 57); Richland, Washington, U.S.
- Genres: Alternative rock, midwest emo post-grunge, grunge, hardcore punk, punk rock, indie rock, post-hardcore, emo
- Occupation: Musician
- Instruments: Bass, guitar, vocals
- Years active: 1982–present
- Member of: Foo Fighters
- Formerly of: Sunny Day Real Estate, Juno, The Fire Theft, Sound City Players

Nathan ‍Gregor ‍Mendel (born December 2, 1968) is an American musician who is the bass guitarist for the rock band Foo Fighters, as well as a former member of Sunny Day Real Estate. He has also worked with musical acts The Jealous Sound and The Fire Theft. He has released one solo album, If I Kill This Thing We're All Going to Eat for a Week, under the name Lieutenant. Though not a founding member, he is the longest-serving member of the band after lead vocalist and guitarist Dave Grohl, and has appeared on every album by the group since The Colour and the Shape.

== Life and career ==
Mendel was born and raised in Richland, a mid-sized city in southeast Washington. His first instrument was the violin. At the age of 13, Mendel started to get interested in rock music and joined a band, a friend who played guitar suggesting he play the bass. Mendel stated that "as I picked up that bass I went on a 20-year detour into punk", helped by his town usually having concerts of DIY punk bands such as Scream. This led to a "pretty limited musical education", as despite taking some lessons with a bassist from a local band, Mendel mostly taught himself to play, and "it was all hardcore punk rock, like Minor Threat, Black Flag and Bad Brains. Instead of studying the bass playing of someone like John Entwistle, which would have given me a foundation of how to play. I just wanted to play a lot of notes fast." His family is Jewish.

Mendel began his musical career in the hardcore band Diddly Squat, which only recorded a 7" single but did a national tour during the 1988 summer vacation. After Diddly Squat ended, Mendel moved to Seattle, where he spent four months on the straight edge band Brotherhood. Afterward, he joined the band Christ on a Crutch, which included bandmate Glen Essary and lasted until 1993. In 1992, Mendel and his University of Washington housemate Dan Hoerner decided to form a band, and invited drummer William Goldsmith to form the group that would end up being named Sunny Day Real Estate (SDRE). Mendel added that SDRE was an attempt to "play more intricate, interesting music". While Mendel toured Europe with Christ on a Crutch, Jeremy Enigk jammed with the remaining members and eventually became a full-time member of SDRE.

Just before Sunny Day Real Estate disbanded in 1995, Mendel and Goldsmith were invited by Dave Grohl to join his band, the Foo Fighters, during the week of Halloween in late October 1994. He has remained a bandmember ever since, being one of the only original members in the Foo Fighters' current lineup along with Grohl and former Nirvana live guitarist Pat Smear. Although Sunny Day Real Estate reunited for two more albums (How It Feels to Be Something On and The Rising Tide), he stayed with the Foo Fighters. In Sunny Day Real Estate, he was replaced by Jeff Palmer, and Palmer was replaced by Joe Skyward. When Skyward left the band, Jeremy Enigk (lead vocalist, rhythm guitarist, and keyboardist) moved to the bass. After Sunny Day Real Estate disbanded once more, Mendel joined with other Sunny Day Real Estate members Jeremy Enigk and William Goldsmith to form The Fire Theft, who released a self-titled album in 2003. In 2001, he played with Juno.

He scored a role in the indie movie Our Burden Is Light, in which he also played a minor role as the main female character's best friend's boyfriend and bassist. In the movie, Mendel plays in a band named Bleeder, consisting of himself, Jessica Ballard, and Taylor Hawkins.

In June 2009, it was confirmed that Sunny Day Real Estate plans to reunite again, with Mendel back in the fold. The band toured in 2009, confirming a new album in the works. However, recording sessions proved to be unproductive and by 2013, the group had broken up once again.

== Technique ==
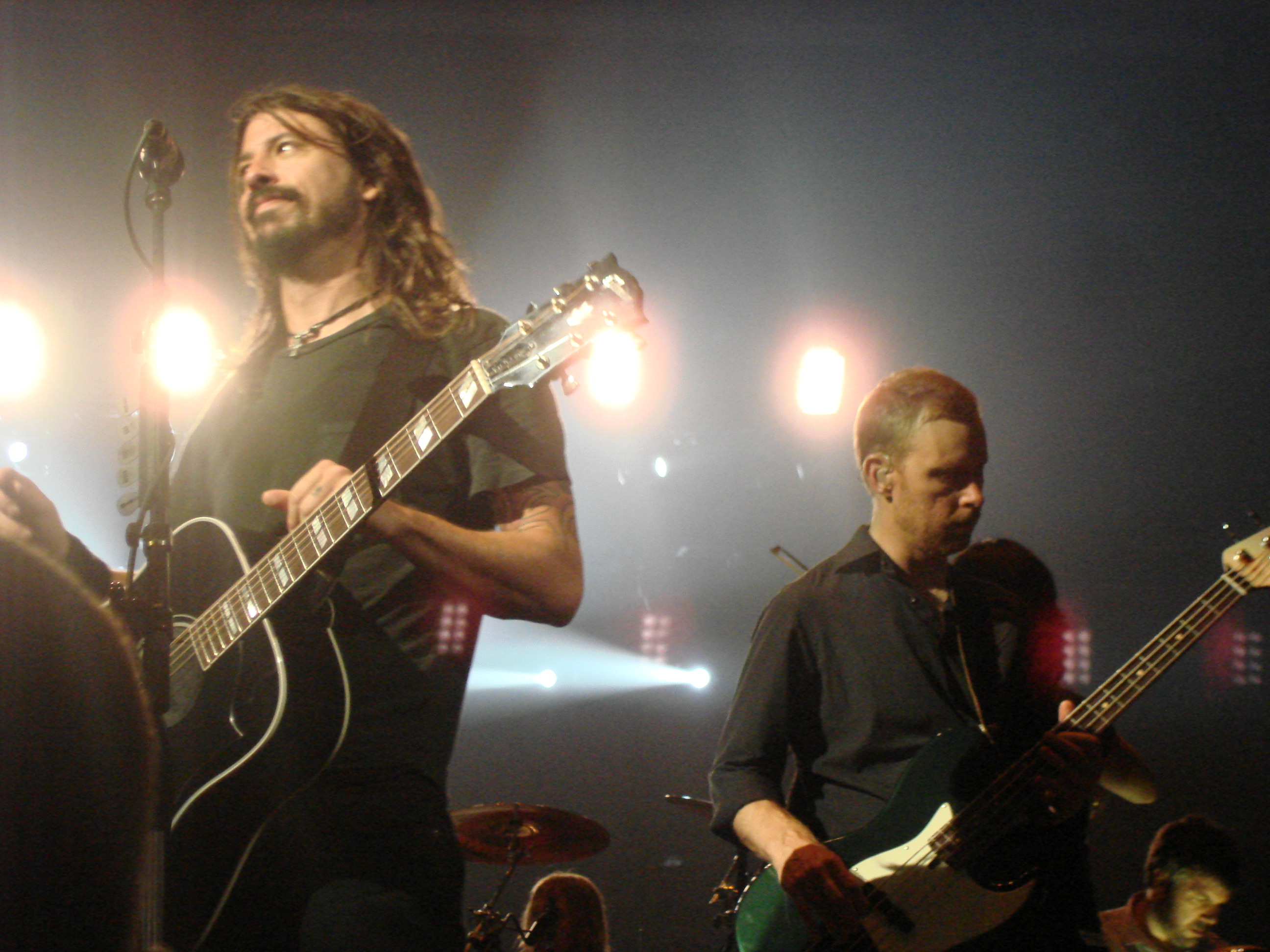
Mendel (right) and Dave Grohl with the Foo Fighters in 2008

Mendel at first considered the bass a melodic instrument, and thus liked to input more personality in his bass parts. Bass Player described Mendel's style in Sunny Day Real Estate as "heavy-handed and fleet-footed, rooted in punk rock but prone to melodic flights that encircled the band's airy arrangements", and Mendel added that in his first years of the Foo Fighters he tried "to make these songs as complicated as I could and put as much bass on there as possible". He eventually changed his priorities to the more traditional bass style where the instrument acts as "the bridge between the melodic element and the percussion", saying that he "alter[ed] the way I play bass so it works in this band, so I can support Dave's songs as best as possible." The priorities he learned to take with his playing was to "play tight and lock better with the drums" adding that when Grohl and drummer Taylor Hawkins decide to redo the drum tracks, at times Mendel would have to remake his whole basslines.

Mendel is known to use a pick almost exclusively. His preferred style was alternate picking, but on the fifth Foo Fighters album, In Your Honor, he started to employ downpicking because "with this kind of music, you need the consistency and percussive sound you get from playing with downstrokes." For the acoustic shows, Mendel played fingerstyle.

== Equipment ==
Mendel's main set-up consists of Fender Precision Basses with GHS strings, played through Ashdown amplifiers. Mendel described the Precision as "iconic" in both its looks and its sound. The bassist's preferred P-Bass is his first, a 1971 model sold to him by the lead singer of Christ on a Crutch which Mendel adapted to be easier to play. Mendel also plays Lakland basses, particularly the Bob Glaub Signature, one of which was employed on the Foo Fighters' seventh album, Wasting Light. He uses a Fulltone Bassdrive pedal, though Mendel downsized the usage of effects pedals as the Foo Fighters rose its number of musicians – "Now that we have three guitar players, there's a lot of distortion going on, so I try to keep it clean and stay in line with the kick drum. That way, I know that even if we're playing a big echoey venue, at least the bass will come across with some bite and precision." In 2012, Mendel received his own signature Fender Nate Mendel Precision Bass, which has become popular globally due to it being a very well built, simply modified vintage style Precision Bass.

== Personal life ==
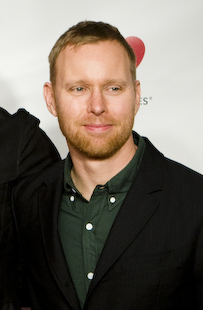
Mendel in 2009

=== Family ===
Mendel met Kate Jackson, co-founder of independent public relations firm Grandstand Media, in 2009 while she was director of marketing and publicity at Sub Pop Records and Mendel was touring as part of a reunion of the original lineup of Sub Pop recording artists Sunny Day Real Estate. They were married on October 11, 2014, accompanied by close friends and family including Mendel's Foo Fighters bandmates. On September 28, 2015, Kate Jackson, co-founder and owner of Grandstand, and her husband Nate Mendel, bassist of Foo Fighters, welcomed the birth of their son, Cormac Bloodmoon Mendel, in Los Angeles. On July 19, 2018, Mendel took a one-show leave of absence from the Foo Fighters' Concrete & Gold tour, with Jane's Addiction bassist Chris Chaney filling in for him for one night at the PPG Paints Arena in Pittsburgh, as he chose to be with Jackson as she gave birth to the couple's twin girls.

=== HIV/AIDS denialism ===
Mendel has expressed fringe views on HIV & AIDS. In January 2000, he organized a sold-out concert in Los Angeles to benefit Alive & Well AIDS Alternatives, an HIV/AIDS denialism group. In April 2000, MTV News reported that "The Foo Fighters have gone on record advocating Alive & Well, an alternative AIDS information group that questions the link between HIV and AIDS." The Centers for Disease Control describe AIDS as the "most severe stage of HIV." Sandra Thurman, then director of the Office of National AIDS Policy commented:

For the Foo Fighters to be promoting this is extraordinarily irresponsible behavior. There is no doubt about the link between HIV and AIDS in the respected scientific community and it's quite unfortunate that a band reads one book and then adopts this theory. To say [that HIV does not cause AIDS] is akin to saying the world is flat.

Responding to coverage of the Alive & Well benefit in Mother Jones magazine, Mendel wrote, "I am not a medical professional, and I am relatively new to these questions, but I am convinced that those who have tested HIV positive and those sick with AIDS are being done a disservice by not having all the information available to them." Links and references to Alive & Well were removed from the band's website by March 2003.

== Discography ==
=== Sunny Day Real Estate ===
- Diary (1994)
- Sunny Day Real Estate (1995)

=== Foo Fighters ===
- The Colour and the Shape (1997)
- There is Nothing Left to Lose (1999)
- One by One (2002)
- In Your Honor (2005)
- Echoes, Silence, Patience & Grace (2007)
- Wasting Light (2011)
- Sonic Highways (2014)
- Concrete and Gold (2017)
- Medicine at Midnight (2021)
- But Here We Are (2023)
- Your Favorite Toy (2026)

=== Juno ===
- A Future Lived in Past Tense (2001)

=== The Fire Theft ===
- The Fire Theft (2003)

=== Lieutenant ===
- If I Kill This Thing We're All Going to Eat for a Week (2015)
