= The Rising Tide (Sunny Day Real Estate album) =

Studio album by Sunny Day Real Estate
- Released: June 20, 2000
- Recorded: Late 1999
- Studio: Dreamland (Hurley, New York)
- Genre: Alternative Rock
- Length: 52:06
- Label: Time Bomb
- Producers: Lou Giordano, Sunny Day Real Estate

Sunny Day Real Estate chronology
Live (1999)	The Rising Tide (2000)

Singles from The Rising Tide
- 1. "One" Released: May 2000

The Rising Tide is the fourth and final studio album by American rock band Sunny Day Real Estate. Following the release of Live, the group left independent label Sub Pop for major label Time Bomb Recordings, and changed from a quartet to a trio. The band spent a month working on material through jamming, eventually resulting in around 30 songs. They began recording at Dreamland Recording Studios in West Hurley, New York with producer Lou Giordano at the end of 1999. The Rising Tide is an alternative rock album, with elements of progressive rock and symphonic rock; the lyrics include references to rain, angels and the ocean. Individual tracks drew comparison to Rush, Yes and Doves, while frontman Jeremy Enigk's vocals were compared to Yes frontman Jon Anderson and U2 frontman Bono.

"One" was released to alternative radio in May 2000, with The Rising Tide following on June 20. It reached number 97 on the Billboard 200, and went on to sell over 67,000 copies in the US by June 2001. It received a generally positive reaction from music critics, some of whom praised Giordano's production and change in Enigk's vocal style. It was promoted with listening parties and in-store appearances, prior to a six-week North American tour. The group went on another US stint towards the end of the year, and had planned to visit Europe in early 2001, however, the trek was cancelled. The group eventually broke up in June citing management issues, advertising and Time Bomb's distribution deal, although they had reunited for two times in 2009 and 2022.

== Background and production ==
Sunny Day Real Estate released their third album How It Feels to Be Something On in September 1998 through independent label Sub Pop. It was a critical success; a live show was recorded in May 1999 and released in October that year under the name Live. Around this time, the band recorded a demo that they planned to shop around to interested producers. Despite finishing their contract with Sub Pop, the label would not let the band leave, forcing them to buy their way out. They signed to major label Time Bomb Recordings, who had a distribution deal with Arista Records. Hoerner said part of the reason they left Sub Pop was due to it not being a "particularly effective label". Despite the addition of former Posies bassist Joe Skyward prior to the release of How It Feels to Be Something On, the band re-grouped as a three-piece with Enigk handling bass. Hoerner found it easier to write material as a trio, which he compared to the group's early days of the same three writing material for their debut album Diary (1994). Lou Giordano visited the group in Seattle, Washington and wrote material through jam sessions for a month. The band spent two-to-three months accumulating around 30 songs before going into pre-production.

The group went to Dreamland Recording Studios in West Harley, New York to record at the end of 1999; sessions concluded by February 2000. Giordano produced the sessions, while the band as a whole as given a co-producer credit. Giordano also acted as the engineer with assistance from Sue Kapa. In addition to their regular roles, each band member also played different instrumentation: Enigk played bass (on every track bar "Television"), piano ("Killed by an Angel", "Disappear", "Snibe", "Fool in the Photograph", "Television" and the title-track), keys ("Killed by an Angel", "Tearing in My Heart", "Faces in Disguise" and the title-track), vocoder ("Snibe"), Mellotron ("The Ocean") and drums ("Tearing in My Heart"); Hoerner played lap steel guitar ("Killed by an Angel") and bass ("Television"); and Goldsmith played percussion ("Snibe", "Fool in the Photograph", "Television", "Faces in Disguise" and the title-track) and sung vocals ("The Ocean" and "Faces in Disguise"). The recordings were mixed in early 2000 by Giordano with assistance from engineer Zach Blackstone at the Warehouse in Vancouver, Canada. The recordings were then mastered by Ted Jensen at Sterling Sound in New York City.

== Composition ==
Musically, the sound of The Rising Tide has been described as arena rock, with the song structures of progressive rock and the sonic textures of symphonic rock; it drew comparison to the pop albums that 1970s progressive rock acts would release in the 1980s, namely Big Generator (1987) by Yes and Power Windows (1985) by Rush. All of the tracks that appeared on the album were written by the band, while Hoerner and Enigk wrote all of the lyrics. The trio's full-band sound is accompanied by keyboard and string instrumentation, and vocal effects. It built on the orchestrated guitar riffs and Enigk's high-pitched vocals of How It Feels to Be Something On. His voice was reminiscent of Yes frontman Jon Anderson, U2 frontman Bono, and Nusrat Fateh Ali Khan. The lyrics, which were done in the style of Bono, make reference to the ocean, rain and angels. Hoerner said the title had two meanings: one that referred to issues in the world (as alluded to in "Killed by an Angel" and "Snibe"); the other being "the beginning of a journey."

The theatrics of the opening track "Killed by an Angel" drew comparison to Rush. It tells the story of a man's lack of ability to tell right from wrong. It is followed by "One", a Pearl Jam-styled track that recalled "Three Days" by Jane's Addiction, with Enigk's vocals resembling Rush frontman Geddy Lee. Hoerner said it was "sort of the anodyne" to "Killed by an Angel", with "One" being the "desire to overcome." The ballad "Rain Song" is a Beatles-esque track influenced by Eastern music, and compared to Jane's Addiction. Its string arrangement was done by Larry Pack and Rob Turner, who also played violin and cello on it, respectively. It featured violin by Stan Kurtis, Rachel Handman and Michelle Stewart; viola by Ryan Hall and Emily Schaad; and cello from Lisa Bressler."Disappear" was compared to Yes and The Joshua Tree (1987)-era U2.

"Snibe" features a vocoder breakdown; Enigk said it was about "a monster. He is willing to hurt others to retire rich and ugly. He kills the innocent to protect his control." It is followed by "The Ocean", a track done in the vein of the Beatles. The Eastern music-indebted track "Fool in the Photograph" is backed by a string arrangement, which was compared to the work of Temple of the Dog. "Tearing in My Heart", alongside the title-track, recalled the atmosphere of the Cure and Radiohead. The pop-esque "Television" was reminiscent of the Police's early 1980s work. The prog-esque "Faces in Disguise" and the title-track recalled Doves and Elbow. The former's string arrangement was done by Derek Bermel. It featured violin by Kurtis, Handman, Stewart and Packer; viola by Hall and Schaad; and cello from Bressler and Turner. The title-track is about ignoring one's problems and letting others make decisions for you; it incorporated programming from Giordano.

== Release ==
On April 4, 2000, The Rising Tide was announced for release in June. Alongside this, a demo version of "The Ocean" was made available for free download through the group's website. In late May, "One" was released to alternative radio. The Rising Tide was released on June 20 through Time Bomb Recordings. The statue on the cover of the album is Vancouver's "Bronze Angel", created by the Montréal sculptor, Coeur de Lion MacCarthy located at the former Canadian Pacific Railway Station. The bronze war memorial depicts the angel of victory raising up a young soldier to heaven at the moment of his death. To promote the album's release, listening parties were held at clubs and the band did in-store appearances at record stores.

With the addition of touring keyboardist/guitarist Greg Suran, the group embarked on a six-week North American tour with support from No Knife in June and July. Between September and November, the group went on another headlining US tour. The Rising Tide was released in Japan on January 24, 2001, with an acoustic live version of "Television" as a bonus track. In February and March 2001, the group planned to embark on a one-month long tour of European, however, the group cancelled the tour over a month before its scheduled start date due to the birth of Hoerner's child. Amongst a series of issues, including the ending of Time Bomb's deal with Arista, problems with the group's management, advertising for The Rising Tide, and the need for a break, the band broke up in June.

== Reception ==
Professional ratings
Aggregate scores
Source	Rating
Metacritic	72/100
Review scores
Source	Rating
AllMusic	4.5/5 stars
The A.V. Club	Favorable
Billboard	Mixed
Entertainment Weekly	C+
Kerrang!	5/5 stars
Pitchfork	5.9/10
Rolling Stone	3/5 stars
SonicNet	Favorable
Spin	Favorable
Wall of Sound	71/100

The Rising Tide peaked at number 97 on the Billboard 200. By June 2001, it had sold over 67,000 copies in the US.

The Rising Tide received generally positive reviews from music critics, according to review aggregator Metacritic. AllMusic reviewer Heather Phares said it demonstrates "the most accomplished version of their gripping, anthemic sound yet." Giorgano's skills provided the album an "unabashedly big, clean sound that frames Sunny Day's detailed songwriting and arrangements perfectly". Spin writer Chris Ryan called the record "stunning" and "just another ballsy leap into the unknown". The A.V. Club's Stephen Thompson said the "recurring nods to prog-rock" were "unsettling the first time through", however, "additional exposures reveal the beautiful, textured rock album within." Spence Abbott of Wall of Sound said the group "mine[d] the vein of epic rock" to deliver "stripped-down arena rock for the new millennium" that acted as "beguilingly hypnotic ... music that is decidedly off-kilter."

Rolling Stone writer Greg Kot said Giordano's "grandiose production ... matches the quasi-mystical visions mapped out in the songs." He highlighted the "otherwordly sound" of Enigk's vocals as "immers[ing] the listener". Mark Athitakis of New Times Broward-Palm Beach Giordano understood the group's dynamic, turning Goldsmith's drumkit sound like "cannonballs fir[ing] in a cathedral", and Enikg's "high-pitched voice into a truly melodic instrument rather than a banshee wail." Orlando Weekly said it was the group's "finest work to date", coming across as "both anthemic and bombastic while still managing to be mysterious and off-kilter." SonicNet's Jon Vena said Enigk's "wailing yelp is smoother here", though by the album's end his "high vocal timbre wears thin." Vena noted that the record was "essentially a tranquil set of string-heavy lullabies" that was "big, experimental and sonically adventurous".

Entertainment Weekly reviewer Laura Morgan said that "after only a few tracks, the nostalgic kick wears off, and the band’s bloated riffs quickly turn tiresome." Pitchfork contributor Brent DiCrescenzo criticized Giordano's production as "magnify[ing] and spotlight[ed] the occasional songwriting errors", and the clearer emphasis on Enigk's vocals, which "can derail a track with one jutting word." Billboard's Jonathan Cohen found it a "mixed blessing"; complimenting Giordano's "penchant for string flourishes, inch-thick synthesizer sheens", however, due to most of the "musical reference points" being "so curiously out of another era", it was "difficult to separate Enigk and ... Hoerner's quizzical lyrics from the accompanying sounds".

== Track listing ==
All songs written by Sunny Day Real Estate, all lyrics by Dan Hoerner and Jeremy Enigk.

No.	Title	Length
1.	"Killed by an Angel"	4:55
2.	"One"	4:09
3.	"Rain Song"	4:03
4.	"Disappear"	4:09
5.	"Snibe"	4:29
6.	"The Ocean"	4:50
7.	"Fool in the Photograph"	4:09
8.	"Tearing in My Heart"	5:07
9.	"Television"	4:31
10.	"Faces in Disguise"	6:02
11.	"The Rising Tide"	5:37

== Personnel ==
Personnel per booklet.

Sunny Day Real Estate

- Jeremy Enigk – vocals, guitar; bass (all except track 9), piano (tracks 1, 4, 5, 7, 9 and 11), keys (tracks 1, 8, 10 and 11), floor & knee (track 3), vocoder (track 5), Mellotron (track 6), drums (track 8)
- Dan Hoerner – guitars (all except track 10); lap steel guitar (track 1), electric sitar (track 7), bass (track 9)
- William Goldsmith – drums (all except tracks 3 and 8), percussion (track 5, 7 and 9–11), vocals (tracks 6 and 10)

Additional musicians

- Larry Packer – string arrangement (track 3), violin (tracks 3 and 10)
- Rob Turner – string arrangement (track 3), cello (tracks 3 and 10)
- Stan Kurtis – violin (tracks 3 and 10)
- Rachel Handman – violin (tracks 3 and 10)
- Michelle Stewart – violin (tracks 3 and 10)
- Ryan Hall – viola (tracks 3 and 10)
- Emily Schaad – viola (tracks 3 and 10)
- Lisa Bressler – cello (tracks 3 and 10)
- Derek Bermel – string arrangement (track 10)
- Lou Giordano – programming (track 11)

Production

- Lou Giordano – producer, engineer, mixing
- Sunny Day Real Estate – co-producer, art direction
- Sue Kapa – assistant engineer
- Zach Blackstone – assistant mixing engineer
- Ted Jensen – mastering
- Jolie Clemens – art direction
- Matthew Kern – angel photography
- F. Scott Schafer – band photography

== Charts ==
Chart (2000)	Peak position
US Billboard 200	97
