= Fire Theft =

Fire theft may refer to:

- The theft of fire for the benefit of humanity as a mythological theme.
- The Fire Theft rock band and its self-titled album.
