= Live (Sunny Day Real Estate album) =

Live album by Sunny Day Real Estate
- Released: October 19, 1999
- Recorded: May 26, 1999
- Genres: Alternative rock, emo
- Length: 62:24
- Label: Sub Pop
- Producer: Steve Smith

Sunny Day Real Estate chronology
How It Feels to Be Something On (1998)	Live (1999)	The Rising Tide (2000)

Professional ratings
Review scores
Source	Rating
AllMusic	3/5 stars
Pitchfork	(5.5/10)

Live is a live album by American emo band Sunny Day Real Estate. A set list from the How it Feels to Be Something On tour, it was recorded on May 26, 1999, in Eugene, OR and released in the same year through Sub Pop. The VHS included the promo music videos for "Seven" and "In Circles".

== Track listing ==
All songs written by Sunny Day Real Estate.

1. "Pillars" – 5:01
2. "Guitar and Video Games" – 4:18
3. "The Blankets Were the Stairs" – 5:48
4. "100 Million" – 5:37
5. "Every Shining Time You Arrive" – 4:31
6. "Song About an Angel" – 6:21
7. "The Prophet" – 6:02
8. "J'Nuh" – 5:48
9. "Rodeo Jones" – 5:08
10. "In Circles" – 5:00
11. "Days Were Golden" – 8:42

== Personnel ==
Personnel taken from Live liner notes.

Sunny Day Real Estate

- Jeremy Enigk – vocals, guitar
- Dan Hoerner – guitar, vocals
- William Goldsmith – drums
- Joe Skyward(credited as Joe Bass) – bass, vocals

Additional personnel

- Steve Smith – production, recording, mixing
- Jon Schluckabier – recording assistance
- Brian Valentino – recording assistance
- John Golden – mastering
- Lance Hammond – photo
- Jesse LeDoux – design

== Charts ==
Chart (1999)	Peak position
US Heatseekers (Billboard)	37
