= OK Bear =

Studio album by Jeremy Enigk
- Released: May 12, 2009
- Recorded: October 15 – November 18, 2008
- Genre: Indie rock
- Label: Lewis Hollow
- Producer: Santi Garcia; Ricky Falkner

Jeremy Enigk chronology
| The Missing Link (2007) | ''OK Bear'' (2009) | Ghosts (2017) |

Professional ratings
Review scores
| Source | Rating |
|---|---|
| Allmusic | 2.5/5 stars |
| Pitchfork Media | (7.1/10) |
| PopMatters | 6/10 stars |
| Spin | 2.5/5 stars |

OK Bear is the title of the fourth release by Sunny Day Real Estate frontman Jeremy Enigk. The album was recorded outside Barcelona during the year 2008.

Enigk has stated that the title of the album comes from a phrase he accidentally said while stringing together what he thought were nonexistent Spanish words.

The album marks a return to a heavier rock sound of Sunny Day Real Estate.

OK Bear has a relatively stripped-down rock aesthetic compared to the orchestral nature of his previous two solo albums.

== Track listing ==
All songs written by Jeremy Enigk.

1. "Mind Idea" – 2:38
2. "Late of Camera" – 2:59
3. "April Storm" – 3:43
4. "Life's Too Short" – 3:07
5. "Just a State of Mind" – 3:01
6. "Sandwich Time" – 3:15
7. "In a Look" – 3:57
8. "Same Side Imaginary" – 3:41
9. "Restart" – 2:40
10. "Make Believe" – 2:33
11. "Vale Oso" – 3:18
12. "Sant Feliu de Guixols" – 3:12

== Personnel ==
- Jeremy Enigk – vocals, acoustic and electric guitars, piano
- Ricky Falkner – bass, vocals, piano, keyboards, acoustic guitar
- Santi Garcia – electric guitar
- Victor Garcia – drums, percussion
- Ramón Rodriguez – vocals
- Marc Clos – percussion, xylophone
- Dani Ferrer – horns
