= Return of the Frog Queen =

Studio album by Jeremy Enigk
- Released: July 23, 1996
- Genre: Chamber pop
- Length: 29:27
- Label: Sub Pop
- Producer: Greg Williamson

Jeremy Enigk chronology
Return of the Frog Queen (1996)	World Waits (2006)

Professional ratings
Review scores
Source	Rating
AllMusic	4.5/5 stars
MusicHound Rock: The Essential Album Guide	3.5/5 stars
Pitchfork	7.8/10
Wall of Sound	80/100

Return of the Frog Queen is a solo album by Jeremy Enigk, recorded following his brief retirement from music due to the temporary split of Sunny Day Real Estate. It was recorded with a 21-piece orchestra and released in 1996. It has a slower and quieter sound than Sunny Day Real Estate's often-bombastic albums.

The album was recorded after Enigk converted to Christianity; this conversion had been originally thought to have brought on the disbanding of Sunny Day Real Estate, though it was later cleared up that his religion was a smaller part of more internal struggles in the band. Sunny Day Real Estate reunited in 1997, when they released How It Feels to Be Something On. The sound of that record furthers the mellower sound developed on Return of the Frog Queen.

According to the 1997 Sub Pop mail-order catalog, Lou Barlow, of fellow Sub Pop band Sebadoh, cited Frog Queen as his favorite album of 1996.

== Critical reception ==
Trouser Press called the album "magical," writing that "other than some Beatlisms, the record occasionally suggests how Syd Barrett might have sounded had he been able to mount a full-fledged production effort, but there’s so much else going on here that any sense of nostalgia quickly evaporates." MusicHound Rock: The Essential Album Guide wrote that "Enigk and his keening, crackly tenor forge an intriguing recording reminiscent of early '70s British psychedelic pop." The New Rolling Stone Album Guide called the album "dazzling, if enigmatic, orchestral pop." In its review of the album's reissue, Pitchfork wrote that Return of the Frog Queen's "orchestral grandeur helped shape indie rock's future."

== Track listing ==
All songs written by Jeremy Enigk.

1. "Abegail Anne" – 3:01
2. "Return of the Frog Queen" – 3:30
3. "Lewis Hollow" – 1:58
4. "Lizard" – 3:14
5. "Carnival" – 4:03
6. "Call Me Steam" – 2:48
7. "Explain" – 3:29
8. "Shade and the Black Hat" – 4:58
9. "Fallen Heart" – 2:22

== Personnel ==
- Jeremy Enigk – vocals, guitar, bass, piano, harpsichord, harp, drums, orchestral arrangements, recording, design
- William Goldsmith – drums (1)

Orchestra

- Mark Nichols – orchestral arrangements, conductor
- Tom Monk – violin
- Ken Wright – violin
- Rosalie Romano – violin
- Daniell McCuthcen – violin
- Carlos Flores – violin
- Sam Williams – viola
- Felicia McFall – viola
- Christine Gunn – cello
- Joe Bichsel – cello
- Anna Doak – upright bass
- Roberta Newland – flute, piccolo
- Laura Sperling – flute, piccolo
- Beverly Reese – percussion, glockenspiel
- Greg Lyons – trumpet
- Chris Stover – trombone
- Fred Hawkinson – bass trombone
- Bruce Dorcy – French horn
- Paulette Fraley – French horn
- Joe LeBlanc – clarinet
- Susan Brey – harpsichord
- Jeni Foster – harp

Production

- Greg Williamson – producer, engineer, mixing
- Curry Wyrick – assistant engineer
- Cathy Lauer – assistant engineer (9)
- Charles Peterson – photography
- Hank Trotter – design
