= The Missing Link (Jeremy Enigk album) =

Studio album by Jeremy Enigk
- Released: August 21, 2007
- Recorded: December 22, 2006
- Genre: Indie rock
- Label: 567 Records
- Producer: Jeremy Enigk, Josh Myers

Jeremy Enigk chronology
World Waits (2006)	The Missing Link (2007)	OK Bear (2009)

The Missing Link is the title of the third release by former Sunny Day Real Estate frontman Jeremy Enigk. The album was self-produced by Enigk and Josh Myers and mastered at West West Side Music by Kimberly Rosen. The album was made available for download through the iTunes Store on August 14, 2007, and was officially released on August 21, 2007.

Tracks 5–9 are new recordings of songs that appear on Enigk's album World Waits. The versions on The Missing Link were recorded live at Sony Studios.

== Track listing ==
1. "Oh John" – 3:45
2. "Chewing Gum" – 4:35
3. "Tatseo Show" – 2:34
4. "On the Wayside" – 4:06
5. "River to Sea" – 3:22
6. "Been Here Before" – 4:09
7. "Canons" – 4:00
8. "Dare a Smile" – 2:56
9. "World Waits" – 5:05

== Credits ==
- Jason Bringle – Drum Programming
- Joel Brown – Engineer
- Jenna Conrad – Cello
- Jeremy Enigk – Bass, Guitar, Piano, Keyboards, Vocals, Producer, Engineer, Mixing
- Casey Foubert – Engineer
- Adrianna Hulscher – Violin
- Matt Johnson – Drums
- Kevin Krentz – Cello
- Nick Macri – Bass
- Nathan Medina – Viola
- Josh Myers – Guitar, Mandolin, Arranger, Keyboards, Vocals, Producer, Engineer, Orchestration, Mixing
- Dave Pauls – Design
- Kimberly Rosen – Mastering
- Coral Sepúlveda – Violin
- Robert Shahnazarian, Jr. – Engineer, Mixing
- Austin Sousa – Engineer
- Greg Suran – Engineer
- Eileen Swanson – Viola
- Kanaan Tupper – Drums
