= Mark Nichols (composer) =

American composer and dramatist

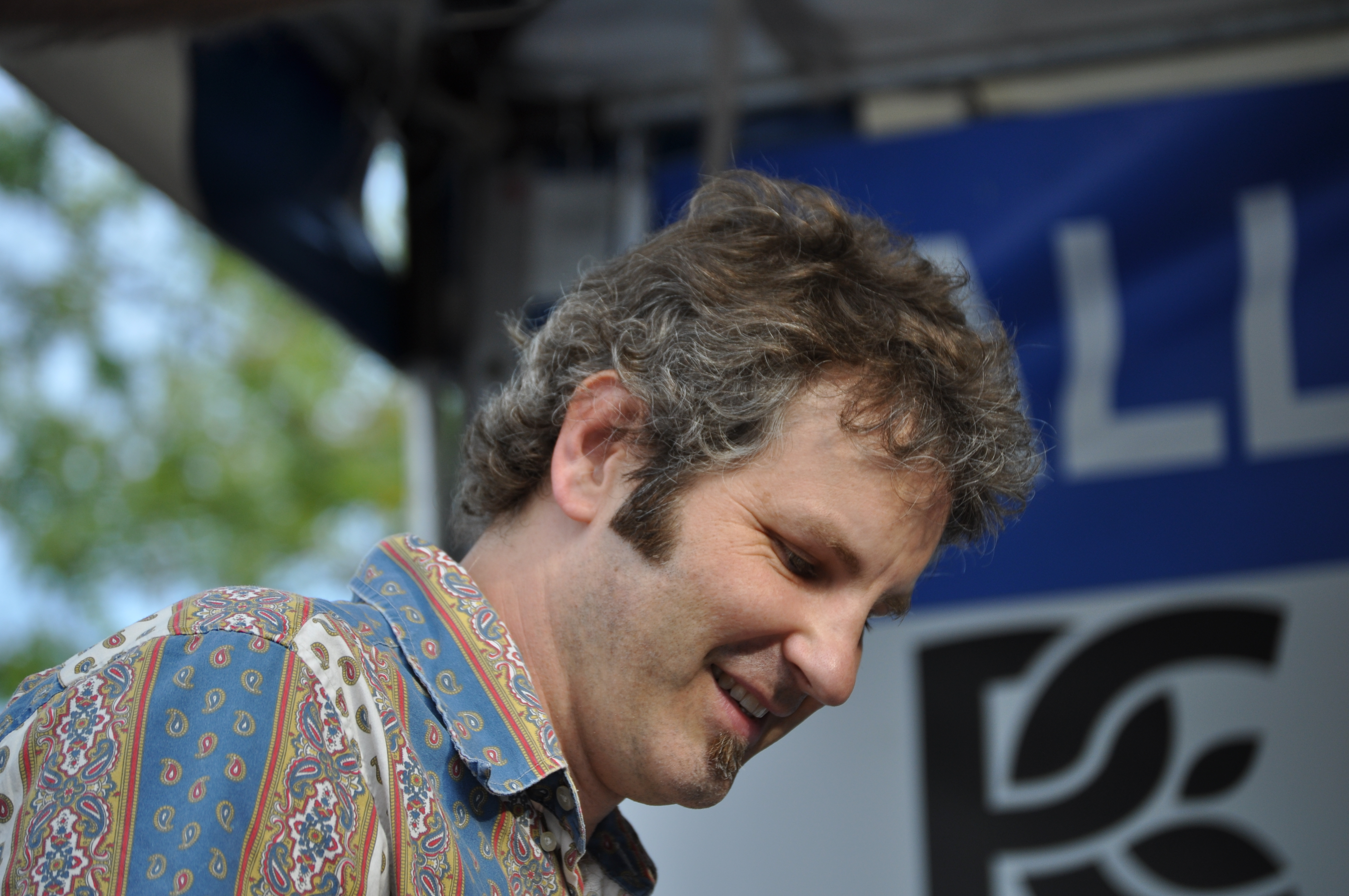
Mark Nichols performing with The Squirrels, 2009.

Mark Nichols (born February 22, 1964) is an American playwright, composer, and lyricist, best known for his musicals Little Boy Goes to Hell (1988), Joe Bean (2003), and How to Survive the Apocalypse (2009). He is also known in the northwestern United States for his work with Fred Jamison (aka Beaverchief of the Lummi) for whom he arranged 20 Northwest Coast Native songs for orchestra, girl choir, and rock band, performed by the Seattle Symphony in 1996.

== Career ==
Nichols began his writing career as a solo artist on Seattle's PopLlama Records after playing keyboards in bands like The Squirrels and Prudence Dredge, and has composed extensively for Seattle film director, Garrett Bennett, and scored all but one of his films, which include End of the Icon, Farewell to Harry, and A Relative Thing. Nichols has written over twenty published works for theater, particularly rock operas, and operas for children. He is one of the founders and composers for the Seattle/Mumbai rock band Manooghi Hi. As an orchestrator, he is known for his work on the classic Sub Pop album by Jeremy Enigk Return of the Frog Queen. Mark has produced a number of other seminal northwest albums, particularly Trillian Green's Metamorphosis, "Awesome"'s CD, Delaware, and Manooghi Hi's debut Hi. In many countries in Europe, his orchestrations for Sub Pop, Glitterhouse Records, folk rock artists The Walkabouts have been widely heard. He received honors for his string arrangements for Norwegian Band Midnight Choir. His score for the Brecht masterpiece Caucasian Chalk Circle has been performed in Cape Town, London, Boise, Chicago, Omaha, Seattle, Helena, Walla Walla, and New York. His surround-sound design for Lauren Weedman's Bust! has been duplicated in many venues around the United States.

== Little Boy Goes to Hell ==
In 1987, The "epic rock fable" Little Boy Goes to Hell, was released as a four-record set with book and marked the composer's first attempt at music theater writing. Beginning in 1983 Nichols began to experience temporal lobe epilepsy which he has stated was "symptomatic of his own intense fear of hell." The play was created, according to the author, to "help heal the symbolism which drove the epilepsy." The autobiographical sprawling journey story revolves around a man who believes he's the devil and a psychiatrist helps him meet his younger self on a journey through a fairy tale woods, where the child meets the Jungian clown archetypes along the forest pathway. "As a young man I created a storybook hell to calm my real world fear of hell". It apparently worked as the composer's epilepsy subsided a few years after Little Boy was first performed at Seattle's Annex Theater in 1988. Goldmine Magazine said of Little Boy: "At last Seattle has a rock musical to do itself proud." The show was also given the award "Art Project of the Year," by The Backlash Magazine.

== Joe Bean ==
The second show to achieve the level of notoriety of Little Boy, Joe Bean, was suggested by his long-time collaborator, Bob McAllister, a Bainbridge Island High School English teacher who had hired Mark to write a spring musical based on the biblical story of Job. Nichols says he did everything possible to make "a depressing story" as much fun as he could, using a plethora of musical styles from Gilbert and Sullivan-inspired chorus to Grunge-era dirge rock to a sort of primal Dead Can Dance sound. The story was expands God and the Devil to include a set of "New Age Gods" who torture the wonderfully adaptable Joe Bean in an effort to see how far a "polytheistic modern rich hippy" can be pushed. In the end Joe has fallen from "the luckiest man ever" to a homeless waif, yet in his misery is finally able to see clearly the metaphorical and actual difference between character/spirit and play/reality. Nichols has cited one of his biggest theatrical influences as Pirandello's Six Characters In Search of An Author.

== How to Survive the Apocalypse (aka "Burning Opera") ==
The most widely popular of the Nichols epic rock operas was created by Erik Davis, Christopher Fuelling, Dana Harrison and Mark Nichols, based on the story of the real-life Burning Man festival, which takes place every year on the Black Rock Desert in Nevada, and its real-life founders. The opera jumps between three time periods in the festival's history: 1986, when "the man" was first burned on San Francisco's Baker Beach; 1996, when the festival experienced its first real tragedies and deep philosophical clashes; and the present day, as seen through the eyes of three "newbies" who undergo a series of unnerving trials during their first 24-hours on the desert. The opera is heavily based on the Cacophony Society's perspective of the "zone trip" concept held by the group. Zone Trip #4, as Burning Man is sometimes referred to is another title this particular show finds itself being called. The opera had its first production in 2009 at San Francisco's Teatro Zinzanni and played to standing ovations. Publicity for the opera described it as "theatrical freak-out that combines rock opera, vaudeville, and a Dionysian revival show that is just as inspired and terrified by current events as you are. Part mutant mystery play, part crash-course in proactive future culture." The concept of epic rock opera seems to have grown in this opera to include an audience-immersive tour of crazy art cars and weirdos and "makers", which, like Burning Man itself, asks there be "no spectators."

== Theater works ==
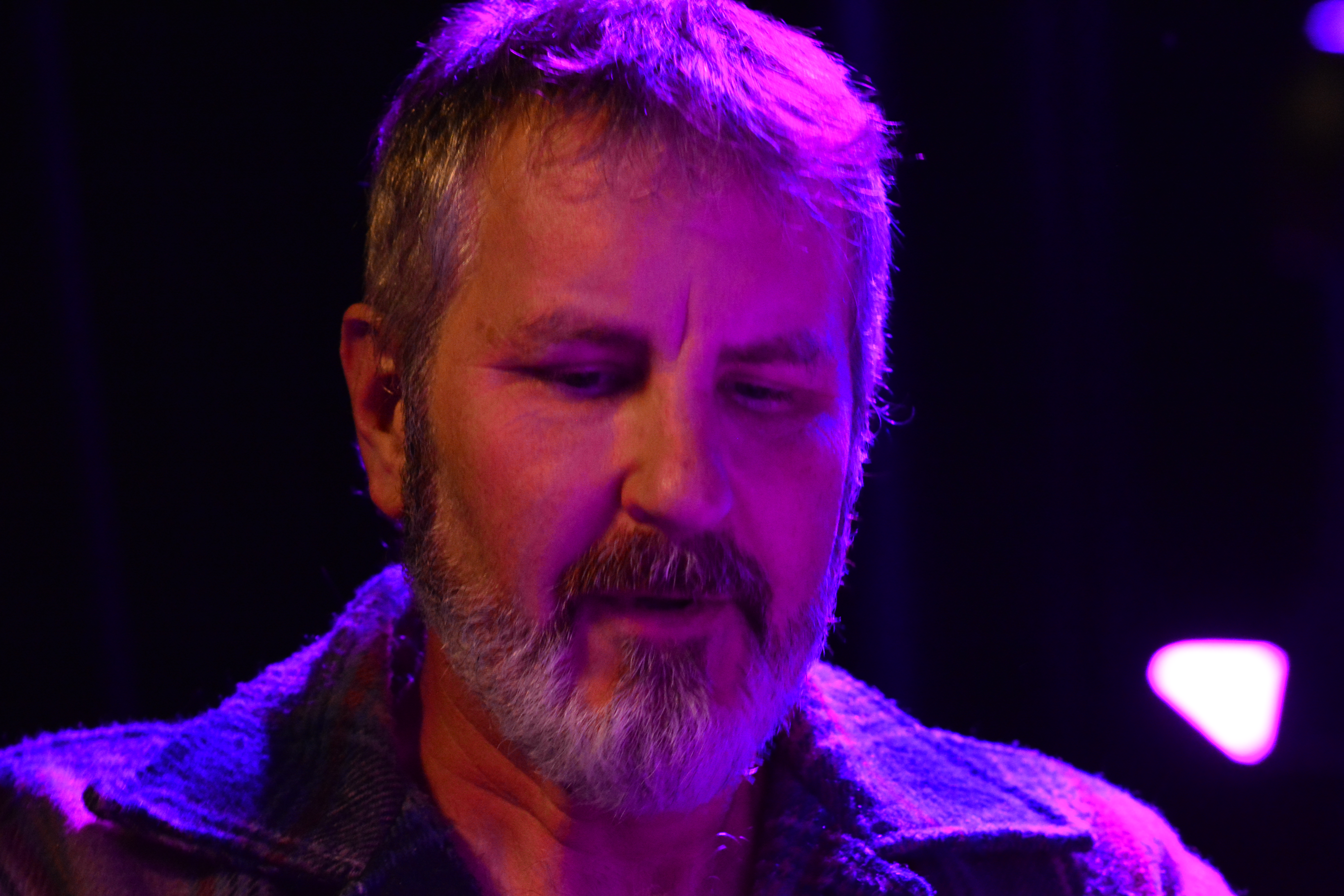
Nichols in 2019

- Little Boy Goes to Hell (1988)
- The Potato Boy (1989)
- Wonka (Based on the movie) (1990)
- The Collected Works of Billy the Kid (1992)
- Bessemer's Spectacles (with Glen Berger) (1993)
- The Tooth Collector (1994)
- Mother Goose (1995)
- Searching For Father Christmas (1996)
- The Dragon (Eugene Schwartz) (1997)
- The Firebugs (1997)
- Joe Bean (With Bob McAllister) (2003)
- Lie of the Mind (with Sam Shepard and Carla Torgerson) (2004)
- Caucasian Chalk Circle (With B. Brecht) (2005)
- As U Like It (with W. Shakespeare) (2007)
- How to Survive the Apocalypse (Aka Beautiful Freaks) (with Erik Davis) (2009)
- The Habit (2009)

== Orchestrator, Arranger or Producer ==
- Walkabouts, Train to Mercy from Scavenger (1991)
- Walkabouts, New West Motel (1993)
- Trillian Green, Metamorphosis (1994)
- Midnight Choir, Olsen's Lot (1996)
- Jeremy Enigk, Return of the Frog Queen (1996)
- Walkabouts, Devils Road (1996)
- Walkabouts, Nighttown (1997)
- Midnight Choir, Amsterdam Stranded (1998)
- Walkabouts, Live In Brussels (2000)
- Midnight Choir Unsung Heroine (2000)
- "Awesome", Delaware (2005)
- Sean Nelson, Nelson Sings Nelson (Unreleased) (2007)

== Soundtracks ==
- Flared Pants, Directed by Garrett Bennett, Starring Brian T Finney & Paul Giamatti (1991)
- One, Dir. G. Bennett (1994)
- Swimming For Bottom, Dir. G. Bennett (1994)
- End of the Icon, Dir. G. Bennett (1995)
- Farewell to Harry, Dir. G. Bennett (1999)
- M & M, Feature Film. Dir. M. Nichols (2000)
- A Relative Thing, Dir. G. Bennett (2003)
- 23 Seagull Variations, Dir. B. McAllister (2004)
- How to Survive the Apocalypse: A Burning Opera. Live in San Francisco (2010)
- H4, Harry Lennix (2019)
