= Greg Suran =

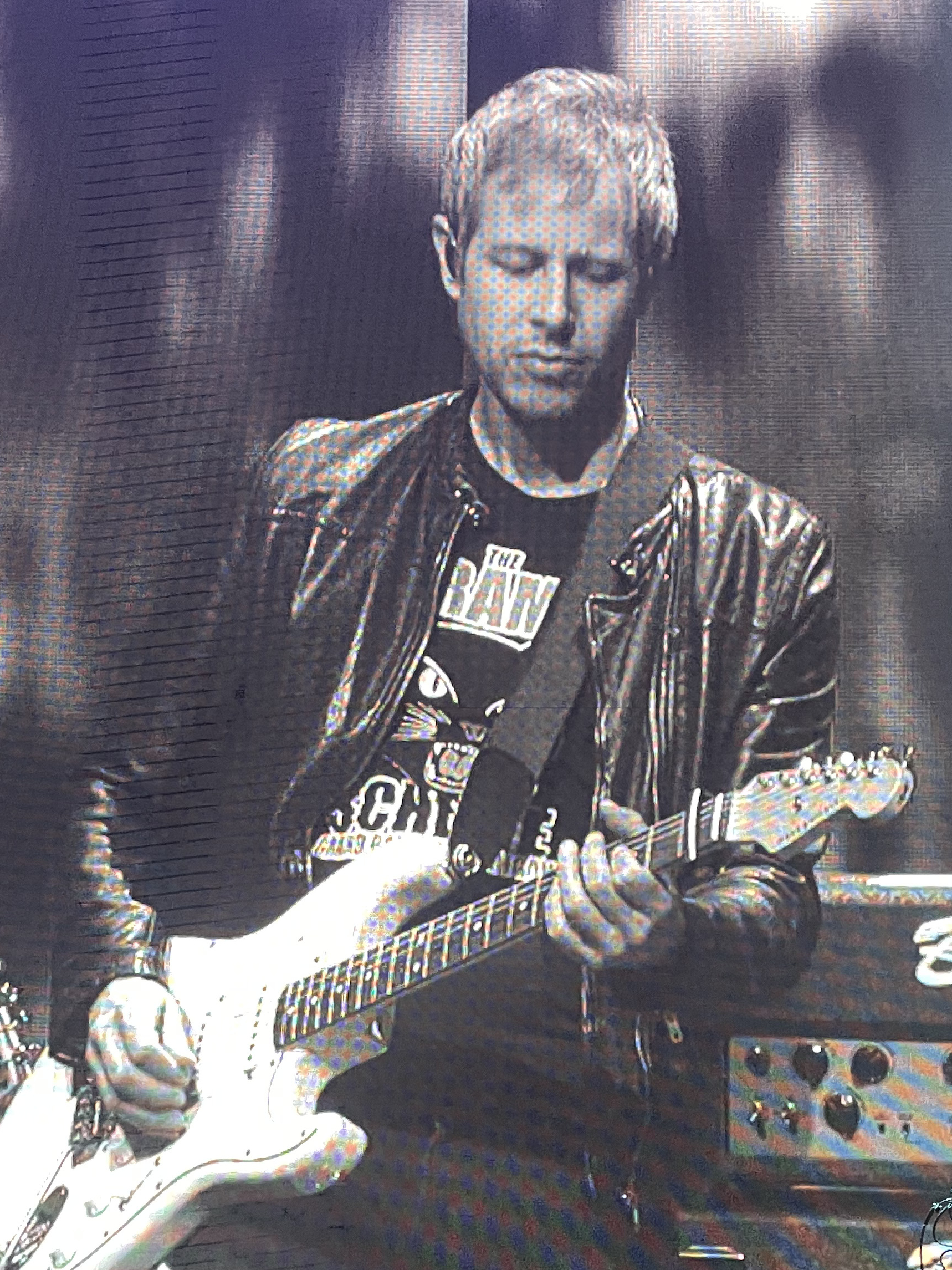
- Greg Suran with the B-52s at Boston Pops on June 14, 2017

Background information
- Genres: Rock; new wave
- Occupations: Musician; composer
- Instruments: Vocals; guitar; keyboards; mandolin
- Years active: 1995–present

Greg Suran is an American musician who was the lead guitarist for live performances in the B-52s, a role he performed from 2013 to 2022. He replaced Keith Strickland on the road after Strickland announced in December 2012 that he would no longer be touring with the B-52s but would continue as a member of the band.

Suran performs in the American Idol house band. Prior to joining the B-52's, Suran had performed and toured with Joe Walsh, Mylene Farmer, Liz Phair, Jewel, Sunny Day Real Estate, and others.

He plays guitar and mandolin and sings backing vocals.

== Education ==
- Bachelor of Music, Northwestern University June 19, 1993

== Career ==
He majored in classical guitar performance while also studying composition and arranging at Northwestern University, near his birthplace.

Throughout his life, though, Suran had played in well-known rock bands, including Sunny Day Real Estate, The Goo Goo Dolls (2002–2007), Machines of Loving Grace, Local H, Cupcakes (a band he formed), which released an album on DreamWorks Records. He has also recorded and/or toured with a diverse range of pop artists such as Avril Lavigne, Liz Phair, Five For Fighting, Colbie Caillat, and Jewel. He has recorded guitar on feature film scores/soundtracks such as Rent, Treasure Planet, and Biker Boyz. Suran had worked as a musician in theater for many years with the Blue Man Group and a production of Hedwig and the Angry Inch.

He toured with Joe Walsh from 2011 to 2013 on the "Analog Man" tour, then also for two tours with French pop star Mylene Farmer in 2009 and 2013, then also with Don Felder, formerly of the Eagles, from 2013–present.

He worked as a session player and touring musician in Los Angeles until he performed with the B-52s in 2013, after Keith Strickland left, and remained with the band until their farewell tour in 2022. He has also been a guitarist in the house band for the television show, American Idol, since its reboot on ABC in 2018.

== Personal life ==
For 6 years, by his own report, he has practiced a vegan diet.

== Albums ==
- Glee – The 3D Concert Movie [OST] (CD), with several other artists, September 8, 2011.
- Cupcakes
- Goo Goo Dolls – Gutterflower
- Goo Goo Dolls – Live in Buffalo
- Goo Goo Dolls – Let Love In
- Jewel – Goodbye Alice in Wonderland
- Jeremy Enigk – World Waits
- Colbie Caillat – Breakthrough
- Five For Fighting – Slice
- Avril Lavigne – Best Damn Thing
- BackStreet Boys – Never Gone
- Jen Wood – Wilderness
