= If I Kill This Thing We're All Going to Eat for a Week =

Studio album by Lieutenant
- Released: March 10, 2015
- Studio: Studio 606, Alexandria, Virginia
- Genre: Rock
- Length: 37:50
- Label: Dine Alone
- Producer: Toshi Kasai; Nate Mendel

Professional ratings
Aggregate scores
Source	Rating
Metacritic	56/100
Review scores
Source	Rating
AllMusic	3.5/5 stars
Consequence of Sound	C+
Pitchfork	(5.8/10)

If I Kill This Thing We're All Going to Eat for a Week is the debut studio album by Foo Fighters bassist Nate Mendel under his project Lieutenant. It was released March 2015 under Dine Alone Records.

== Track listing ==
All tracks composed by Nate Mendel

No.	Title	Length
1.	"Belle Epoque"	4:20
2.	"The Place You Wanna Go"	4:03
3.	"Believe the Squalor"	4:14
4.	"Rattled"	3:36
5.	"Prepared Remarks"	3:44
6.	"Some Remove"	4:19
7.	"Sink Sand"	4:47
8.	"Artificial Limbs"	4:03
9.	"Lift the Sheet"	4:44
