= Sunny Day Real Estate (album) =

Studio album by Sunny Day Real Estate
- Released: November 7, 1995
- Recorded: 1993–1995
- Genres: Alternative rock; indie rock
- Length: 37:14
- Label: Sub Pop
- Producers: Sunny Day Real Estate; Brad Wood

Sunny Day Real Estate chronology
Diary (1994)	Sunny Day Real Estate (1995)	How It Feels to Be Something On (1998)

Professional ratings
Review scores
Source	Rating
AllMusic	3.5/5 stars
Drowned in Sound	6/10
Pitchfork	7.8/10
Sputnikmusic	4.0/5

Sunny Day Real Estate is the second studio album by American rock band Sunny Day Real Estate. The band's label, Sub Pop, distributed the album under the title LP2. Due to its simple pink cover, the album is often referred to as "The Pink Album". It was the band's final release to feature founding bassist Nate Mendel until their single "Lipton Witch", released in 2014 after their third breakup.

The album was remastered and reissued in 2009, with bonus tracks and newly written liner notes. The bonus tracks are "Spade and Parade" (originally a B-side of the song "Friday") and "Bucket of Chicken" (released as a B-side to the song "How It Feels to be Something On").

== Overview ==
The album is entirely covered in pink, with the band's name across the cover in small type, and doesn't include any liner notes. The cover's simple design and nickname is a reference to The Beatles' eponymous 1968 double album, known as "The White Album". This album was released in November 1995, several months after the band's first break-up.

"8" and "Friday" were re-recorded for the album. Both songs had been recorded and released previously on 7-inch singles. The final track, "Rodeo Jones", was recorded during the sessions for the previous album, Diary, and was previously released as a b-side on the "In Circles" promo single. In addition, "8" is featured on the Batman Forever soundtrack.

In November 1995, Sub Pop released the band's second album, bearing only the label Sunny Day Real Estate. The album was released without cover art or liner notes, and was distributed by Sub Pop as LP2. It has also occasionally been referred to as "The Pink Album", a reference to its solid pink cover. When Sub Pop contacted the band for artwork for the release, the band had nothing to offer, so Goldsmith suggested that they "make it pink". The album included the songs recorded during the brief sessions, as well as tracks such as "Rodeo Jones" that were recorded during the sessions for Diary.

Enigk confessed in an interview in December 2008 that because the band had already broken up during the recording of LP2, he and Hoerner never sat down to complete the lyrics; "We broke up and we just felt like we were done. We put no energy into the artwork or into anything. On a lot of songs, there aren’t lyrics! In a lot of cases, we never sat down to write them, because we just wanted to get it out of the way as fast as possible. So I just sang a lot of gibberish, which makes it really quirky. My favorite is the Japanese translations".

"Red Elephant" was ranked at number 44 on Spin's "The 95 Best Alternative Rock Songs of 1995" list.

== Track listing ==
All tracks are written by Sunny Day Real Estate.

No.	Title	Length
1.	"Friday"	2:29
2.	"Theo B"	3:05
3.	"Red Elephant"	3:19
4.	"5/4"	3:33
5.	"Waffle"	4:25
6.	"8"	5:28
7.	"Iscarabaid"	4:47
8.	"J'Nuh"	4:52
9.	"Rodeo Jones"	5:09
Total length:		37:13

Reissue bonus tracks
No.	Title	Length
10.	"Spade and Parade"	4:28
11.	"Bucket of Chicken"	5:30
Total length:		47:11

== Demos ==
The band recorded demos for all the songs on the album except for "Rodeo Jones", which had already been demoed and recorded at the Diary sessions. "The Crow" was later re-recorded as "Bucket Of Chicken" and released as a b-side to the song "How It Feels To Be Something On" in 1998. Only one tape from those sessions has surfaced. The demos for "J'nuh" and "Iscarabaid" are instrumental. The track list is as follows:

1. "Theo B"
2. "5/4"
3. "Red Elephant"
4. "Friday"
5. "Waffle"
6. "8"
7. "J'nuh"
8. "Iscarabaid"
9. "The Crow"

== Personnel ==
Sunny Day Real Estate

- Jeremy Enigk – vocals, guitar
- Dan Hoerner – guitar, backing vocals
- Nate Mendel – bass
- William Goldsmith – drums, percussion

Production

- Sunny Day Real Estate – production
- Brad Wood – production

== Charts ==
Chart (1995)	Peak position
US Heatseekers (Billboard)	25
