= Manooghi Hi =

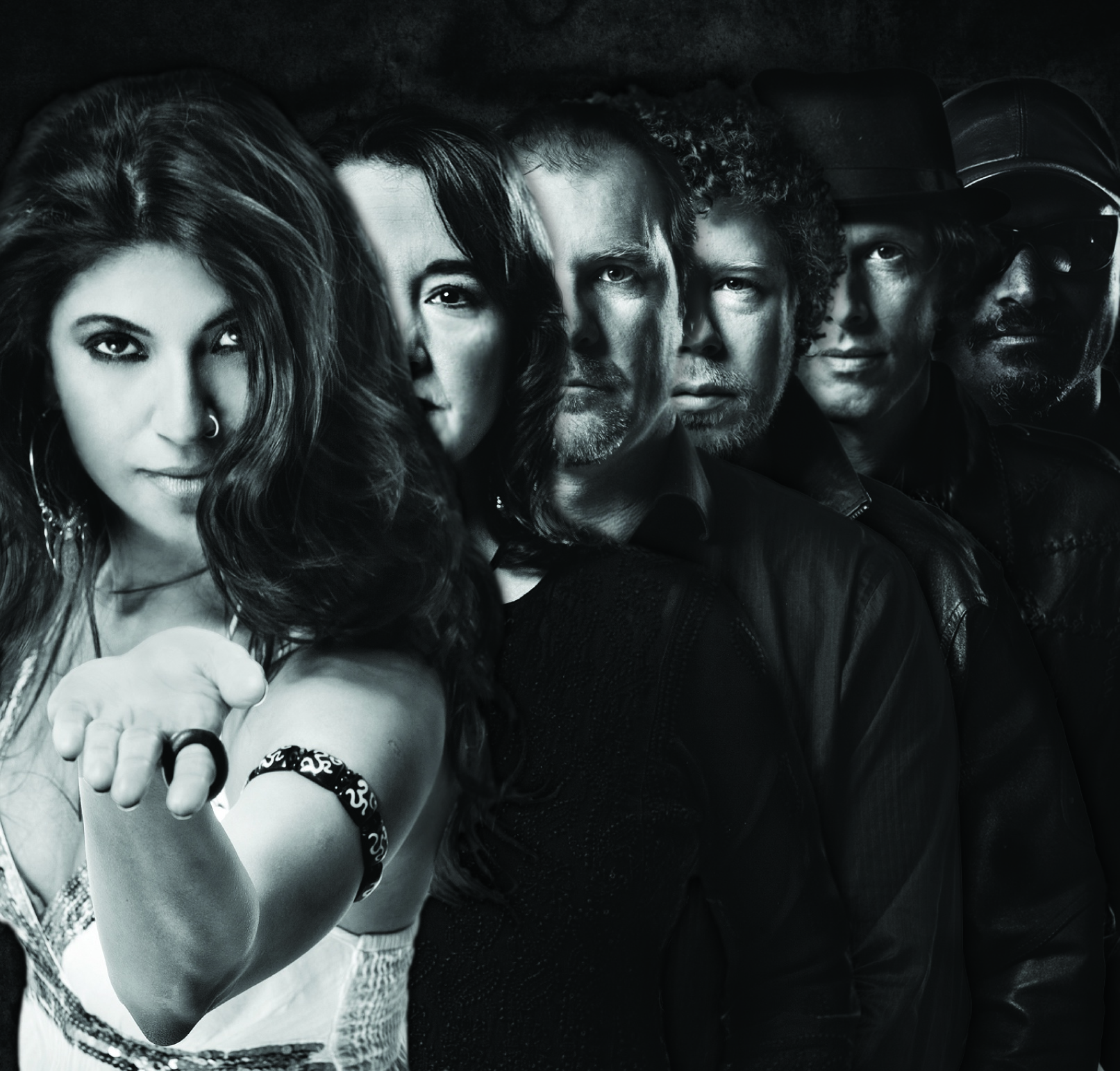

Background information
- Origin: Seattle, Washington, United States
- Genres: Progressive rock
- Years active: 2007-present
- Label: Mowlawner Records

Manooghi Hi is a Seattle-based rock band formed in 2007 and featuring Indian pop singer, Mehnaz Hoosein. Their music is a blend of western rock-n-roll harmony and instrumentation with Indian melody and rhythms. The band sings in a variety of South Asian languages, including English, Sanskrit, Hindi, and Bengali.

Manooghi Hi released their debut album Hi in 2009 and their second release "Silence" in 2011. They have performed at festivals including Seattle's Bumbershoot Arts Festival, Austin's SXSW music conference, the Sundance Film Festival in Park City Utah, Oregon Country Fair in Eugene Oregon, Salem Oregon's "World Music Festival" and Darrington, Washington's Summer Meltdown. Manooghi Hi has been featured on KING TV Channel 5's "Northwest Evening Magazine", KCPQ Q13's "Morning Show", Seattle Channel's "Art Zone", KZOK radio's "The Bob Rivers Show", KEXP's local music spotlight "Audioasis" and KEXP's online feature "Song of the Day". Manooghi Hi has played concerts for Seattle City Hall and in Northwest rock clubs including repeat performances at The Triple Door, Crocodile Cafe, Neumo's and Chop Suey in Seattle. The band has also been featured in publications such as The Times of India. and The Seattle Times. After watching their performance at the "SXSW" music conference in Austin in March 2009, Jonathan Zwickel of The Seattle Times wrote 'The cross-pollination is dizzying — East and West, ancient and modern, pop and classical, ecstatic spiritualism and headbanging rock.'

== Personnel ==
=== Current members ===
- Mehnaz Hoosein - lead vocals
- Ava Chakravarti - vocals
- Todd Fogelsonger - guitar
- Jimmy Thomas - bass
- John Hollis - drums (RIP)
- Kent Halverson - keyboards

=== Past members ===
- Mark Nichols

=== Producer ===
Mowlawner Records: Paul Vallins, Todd Fogelsonger

== Discography ==
=== Albums ===
- Hi (2009) Manooghi Hi Records
- Silence (2011) Mowlawner Records
