= World Waits =

Studio album by Jeremy Enigk
- Released: October 17, 2006
- Studio: Robert Lang (Shoreline, Washington); Soundhouse Recording
- Genre: Indie rock
- Length: 36:30
- Label: Lewis Hollow
- Producer: Jeremy Enigk, Josh Myers

Jeremy Enigk chronology
Return of the Frog Queen (1996)	World Waits (2006)	The Missing Link (2007)

Professional ratings
Review scores
Source	Rating
AllMusic	2.5/5 stars
Pitchfork Media	(7.0/10)

World Waits is the second full-length album by musician Jeremy Enigk, following Return of the Frog Queen (1996). World Waits was released October 17, 2006, on Enigk's own label, Lewis Hollow Records.

== Track listing ==
All songs written by Jeremy Enigk.

1. "A New Beginning" – 1:27
2. "Been Here Before" – 4:11
3. "River to Sea" – 3:00
4. "City Tonight" – 5:06
5. "Canons" – 3:59
6. "Damien Dreams" – 3:37
7. "Wayward Love" – 2:18
8. "Dare a Smile" – 3:08
9. "World Waits" – 4:34
10. "Burn" – 5:05

== Chart positions ==
=== Album ===
Year	Chart	Position
2006	Heatseekers	22

== Personnel ==
- Kevin Barrans – Accordion
- Dalton Brand – Mastering
- Jason Bringle – Drum Programming
- Joel Brown – Engineer
- Jenna Conrad – Cello
- Jeremy Enigk – Bass, Guitar, Drums, Keyboards, Vocals, Producer, Engineer, Mixing
- Jon Ervie – Engineer
- Casey Foubert – Drums, Engineer
- Mark Greenberg – Engineer
- Adrianna Hulscher – Violin
- Matt Johnson – Drums
- Andrew Kelly – Artwork
- Kevin Krentz – Cello
- Rebecca K. Lowe – Violin
- Nick Macri – Bass
- James McAlister – Drums
- Nathan Medina – Viola
- Andy Myers – Vocals
- Heidi Myers – Vocals
- Josh Myers – Bass, Trombone, Arranger, Keyboards, Vocals, Producer, Engineer, Orchestration, Mixing
- Coral Sepúlveda – Violin
- Joe Skyward – Bass, Engineer
- Austin Sousa – Engineer
- Greg Suran – Guitar, Engineer
- Eileen Swanson – Viola
- Mark Swanson – Vocals, Photography
- Rosie Thomas – Vocals
- Kanaan Tupper – Drums, Mixing
- Jen Wood – Vocals
