= Indigo Swing =

Indigo Swing was an American retro swing band of the mid-late 1990s, based out of San Francisco, California. They released two albums for the independent Time Bomb Recordings label, All Aboard! (1998) and Red Light! (1999).

Founded in 1992, the initial inspiration for the group came when founder John Boydston saw a swing outfit performing in San Francisco's Club Deluxe. He wanted to capture the feel of the swing era of the 1940s and bring back styles of dancing that connected the partners, and so went looking for musicians that shared that vision.

He recruited a group by word-of-mouth, including actor and pianist Pete Sutherland, guitarist and corporate executive Harold Fethe, and attorney-bassist Andrew Coblentz. That group developed the band's name during a weekend workshop. By late 1992, they were playing a date under the Indigo Swing name in a San Francisco club.

Later, Boydston replaced the band. The most well-known lineup of Indigo Swing consisted of singer John Boydston, stage name "Johnny Boyd"; Josh Workman on guitar; Vance Ehlers on string bass; drummer "Big Jim" Overton; William Beatty on piano; and saxophone and flute player Barry "Baron Shul" Shulman. The band stressed playing original music, not just renditions of classic swing tunes.

The group did a lot of touring; in many cases they opened for The Brian Setzer Orchestra. The group had a high-energy performing style. A typical Indigo Swing show had some people just listening to the music but many people up and out on the dance area the whole time. As such, the group gained a following and some measure of renown; as an Albuquerque Journal story put it, the group became "one of the name bands in swing".

The group was signed to the independent label Time Bomb Recordings in 1997. A review in the Lincoln Journal Star of their first release for the label, All Aboard!, gave it four stars, saying that as a record it was the best of the recent crop of retro swing releases. A review in The Washington Post said that the album's musical mix produced "engaging results", praising the group's rhythm section and the saxophone work of Baron Shul.

The group underwent a number of personnel changes at various times, and at the end of 1999, Boyd departed.
