= Jim Guerinot =

Jim Guerinot is an American music manager and record executive. He is the owner of Rebel Waltz, an entertainment company based in Laguna Beach, California.

== Early life and education ==
Jim Guerinot was born in St. Louis, MO and moved to Rochester, NY before the age of one. At 13 years old he moved to Fullerton, CA. At 16, he took the GED, and started classes at Cypress Junior College, transferring to Fullerton Junior College to obtain an AA degree before graduating from UC Irvine in 1985 with a BA degree in English.

While at Fullerton College Guerinot began bringing bands to the school while booking a local nightclub, Ichabod's, on Sunday nights. Simultaneously, he began managing his friend's local band, Big Beat, but had not tried his hand at management beyond that. Through a chance meeting with Social Distortion guitar player Dennis Danell, Guerinot offered to book the band into the local club and pay them $1000. After procuring the band several more gigs, Danell suggested to the band's manager, Monk Rock, they bring Guerinot on board as an agent to handle the band's bookings.

At the same time Guerinot moved into “Bad Otis” Link's office in Signal Hill and began working for Gary Tovar's Goldenvoice Concert company. Along with Mike Vraney, manager of the Dead Kennedys and TSOL, Guerinot and Vraney started booking bands’ tours in the back of Link's silk screen warehouse, creating the Goldenvoice agency for Tovar. The two would book Vraney clients Dead Kennedys, TSOL and Guerinot client Social Distortion as well as 45 Grave, The Dickies, Agent Orange, The Vandals (whom Guerinot would take on as manager), and other groups that Tovar would fly to Southern California for concerts. Guerinot began making flyers for the shows he booked and created the artwork for the weekly Goldenvoice ads that ran in the LA Times.

== Career ==
While doing this he completed his studies at UCI in June 1985, and Guerinot joined his friend Steve Rennie at Southern California concert promotion powerhouse, Avalon Attractions. With Bruce Springsteen scheduled to perform four sold-out concerts at the 80,000 capacity LA Coliseum, Guerinot was hired under what Avalon owner Brian Murphy would call, the “Bruce Excuse”. It was at Avalon Guerinot would begin co management of Dramarama with Steve Rennie.

Larry Vallon and Jay Marciano hired Guerinot in 1987 and brought him aboard to book Universal Amphitheatre. This coincided with MCA Concerts expansion into amphitheaters in Denver and Atlanta. While here Guerinot handled much of the “alternative” booking. In mid 1988, at the suggestion of agent Marc Geiger, Guerinot was approached to join A&M Records by Michael Leon and President Gil Friesen.

From 1988 until July 1994, Guerinot rose through the ranks, eventually departing as Senior Vice President/General Manager of the label. In April 1994, Guerinot added The Offspring to his management roster of Social Distortion, and prepared to begin his own full time management company Rebel Waltz, Inc., named for a song on “Sandinista” by The Clash.

After turning down the presidency of Columbia Records, Guerinot started Time Bomb Recordings, his own label, through Clive Davis’ Arista Records and BMG while Rebel Waltz took on management of Chris Cornell after Cornell left Soundgarden, and Rancid. Guerinot later added Beck, Hot Hot Heat, Trent Reznor/Nine Inch Nails, No Doubt/ Gwen Stefani, and Robbie Robertson.

Guerinot also co-founded SLAM Management, an action sports management company, with Pat Hawk and Terry Hardy. Clients included Tony Hawk, Kelly Slater, Shaun White, Bam Margera, and others. Jim was also a co-owner of Tony Hawk's "Boom Boom Huck Jam" arena sized action sports touring exhibition.

Guerinot co-wrote the children's book, Legends, Icons, and Rebels, which came out in 2013.

He produced the documentary film, 20 Feet From Stardom, after its original producer, Gil Friesen—Guerinot's friend and mentor from A&M, passed away. The film won the Academy Award for Best Documentary in 2014.

In June 2019 Guerinot delivered the commencement address to the school of Humanities at UC Irvine.

For three years, 2020–2022, he served on the board of Ashland Home, an indigent care facility for women, that has helped over 3000 women get safely off the street and transition back into society.

He taught, “Inside the Music Business”, at Chapman University in spring of 2023. The class provided students a comprehensive overview of the music industry featuring in person interviews with industry leaders.
