= Cupcakes (band) =

- Origin: Chicago, IL
- Genre: Power pop
- Years active: 1996-2000
- Label: DreamWorks
- Past members: Matt Walker; Preston Graves; Greg Suran; Solomon Snyder
- Website: Facebook

Cupcakes were a Power pop band from Chicago who were signed to the DreamWorks record label and released one self-titled album in 2000. The band's drummer, Matt Walker, had previously played with the Smashing Pumpkins and Filter and would go on to play with Garbage and Morrissey. Guitarist Greg Suran would go on to tour with the Goo Goo Dolls and the B-52's.

== History ==
Prior to forming the Cupcakes, Matt Walker, Solomon Snyder and Preston Graves had previously played together in a band called Tribal Opera. Following the break-up of Tribal Opera, Graves started working with Greg Suran, and by 1996 both Walker and Snyder had joined. They started performing as the Cupcakes. By 1997 they were signed by DreamWorks and they flew to London to record with notable producer, Stephen Street (The Smiths, Blur, the Cranberries). However, the label dropped the band shortly after their self-titled album was released in 2000.

Following the end of Tribal Opera, Walker had been touring with Filter when he was recruited by the Smashing Pumpkins to replace Jimmy Chamberlin. He joined the Smashing Pumpkins, but left when Cupcakes got signed by DreamWorks.

== After Cupcakes ==
In December 2012, Graves and Walker formed a new band called Stuttgart, with Scott Tallarida, Thomas Walker and Michael Sinclair rounding out the line-up.

== Reception ==
- "Alternating arena roar with moments of fey, falsetto fragility, and threading android synthesizers through power-chord anthems, the Cupcakes' debut is a big, bombastic dare." (Greg Kot, Chicago Tribune)
- "Ably propelled by former Smashing Pumpkins and Filter drummer Matt Walker and produced by Stephen Street (Blur, the Smiths, the Cranberries), these 13 tracks court wretched excess with walls of snarling guitars and chirping keyboards" (Jim DeRogatis, Chicago Sun-Times)

== Members ==
- Preston Graves — vocals
- Greg Suran — guitar, vocals
- Solomon Snyder — bass
- Matt Walker — drums

== Discography ==
=== Albums ===
- Cupcakes 2000 DreamWorks

=== Compilation appearances ===
- "Vidiots" - Back to School Domestic Sampler 1999 DreamWorks
- "Exaggerator" - 8 Trax Plus 2 1999 DreamWorks
