= The Fire Theft (album) =

Studio album by The Fire Theft
- Released: September 23, 2003
- Studio: The Fire Theft (Kirkland, Washington); Brad's Guest House (Valley Village, California); The Park (Studio City, California)
- Genre: Progressive rock, hard rock, art rock
- Length: 58:44
- Label: Rykodisc
- Producer: Brad Wood, The Fire Theft

The Fire Theft chronology
The Fire Theft (2003)	Hands on You EP (2004)

Singles from The Fire Theft
- 1. "Chain" Released: 2003

Professional ratings
Aggregate scores
Source	Rating
Metacritic	63/100
Review scores
Source	Rating
AllMusic	4.5/5 stars
Pitchfork Media	5.0/10

The Fire Theft is the only studio album by American rock band The Fire Theft. The album was released September 23, 2003, through the independent record label Rykodisc. In September 2019, the service Run Out Groove made a poll on their site to test demand for vinyl reissues of their catalog, with one of the choices being The Fire Theft. The album won out, and was subsequently remastered and reissued with new artwork.

== Track listing ==
All songs written by Jeremy Enigk and William Goldsmith.

1. "Uncle Mountain" – 4:03
2. "Waste Time Segue" – 1:02
3. "Oceans Apart" – 4:15
4. "Chain" – 3:43
5. "Backwards Blues" – 2:46
6. "Summertime" – 4:01
7. "Houses" – 3:14
8. "Waste Time" – 4:15
9. "Heaven" – 4:12
10. "Rubber Bands" – 4:01
11. "It's Over" – 4:01
12. "Carry You" – 4:22
13. "Sinatra" – 14:49
- Some CD pressings omit "Waste Time Segue" showing "Oceans Apart" as track 2 and thus totaling only 12 tracks. This led to confusion as to the song titles as each track number after "Uncle Mountain" is offset by one (i.e. "Sinatra" is listed as track 12 even though it is track 13).

== Personnel ==
The Fire Theft

- Jeremy Enigk – guitar, vocals
- Nate Mendel – bass guitar
- William Goldsmith – drums, percussion

Orchestra

- Violin: Gregg Rice, Ken Wright
- Viola: Sam Williams
- Cello: Dave Beck
- Bass Violin: Phil Wright
- French Horn: Roger Burnett
- Bass Trombone and Tuba: Dan Marcus
- Clarinet: Craig Flory
- Bass Clarinet, Clarinets, Flute, Piccolo: Jim Dejoie
- Glockenspiel: Jeremy Enigk
- Girl Voice: Kelsey Mackin
- Children's Choir: Kelsey Mackin, Ella Banyas, Lilliam Louden-Mosio, Julia Thomas, and Lauren Hill

=== Production ===
- Produced by: Brad Wood and The Fire Theft
- Mixed by: Brad Wood
- Engineered by: Brad Wood, Jeremy Enigk, William Goldsmith, Greg Williamson, and Adam Wade.
- Mastered at: Oasis Mastering
- Recorded at: The Fire Theft STudio, Kirkland, WA; Brad's Guest House, Valley Village, CA; and The Park Studio, Studio City, CA.
- Mixed at: The Park Studio, Studio City, CA

== Charts ==
Chart (2003)	Peak position
US Billboard 200	198
US Top Heatseekers	11
US Top Independent Albums	12
