= The Fire Theft =

American rock band

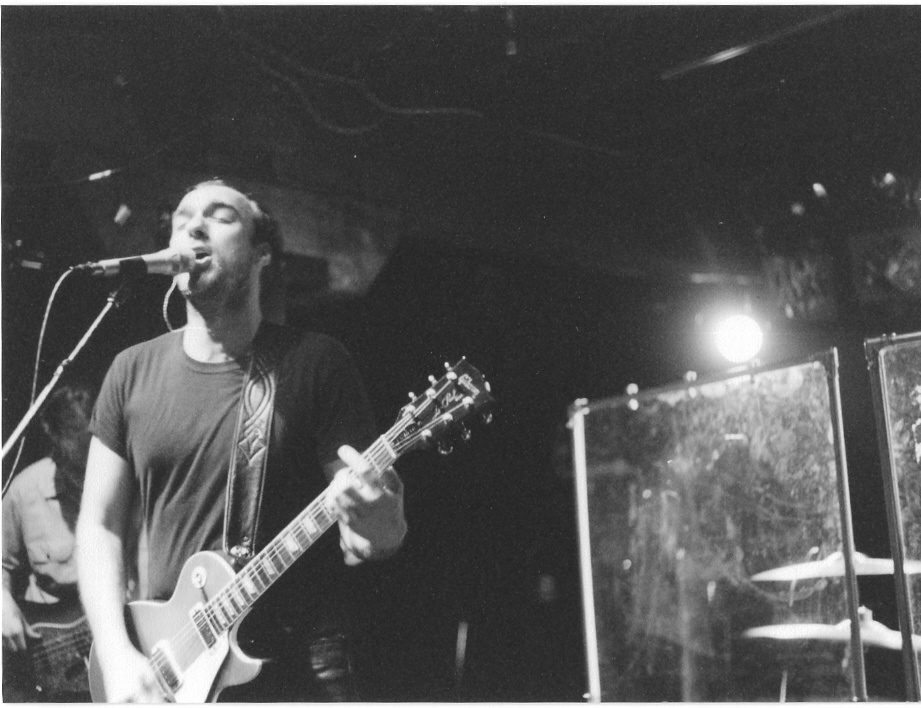
- Jeremy Enigk performing with the band

Background information
- Origin: Seattle, Washington, U.S.
- Genres: Progressive rock; hard rock; art rock; emo
- Years active: 2001–2004
- Label: Rykodisc
- Spinoff of: Sunny Day Real Estate
- Past members: Jeremy Enigk; William Goldsmith; Nate Mendel

The Fire Theft was an American rock band from Seattle, Washington. They were formed in 2001 by vocalist/guitarist Jeremy Enigk, bassist Nate Mendel, and drummer William Goldsmith, all of whom were previously members of Sunny Day Real Estate. Mendel also plays bass for Foo Fighters, and Goldsmith drummed for Foo Fighters between 1995 and 1997. This lineup of The Fire Theft was three-fourths of the original personnel of Sunny Day Real Estate, with guitarist Dan Hoerner not rejoining his former bandmates.

While the band went on a hiatus in 2004, there was never an announcement of an official breakup.

== History ==
The Fire Theft released a self-titled album on September 23, 2003, on independent label Rykodisc. Only "Chain" was released as a promotional single. A tour promoting the album followed up. Since then, the band has been in a hiatus. Concerning future projects, Jeremy Enigk has stated on the official message board that he imagined "The Fire Theft will be back in full swing. We just have to find another record label or start our own". A DVD with the band performing in Seattle had also been announced, but was never released. In 2007, Billboard.com reported that the band was in discussions about regrouping. In the same article, Nate Mendel says "We're not really quite sure. But we're making some plans to play together in one way or another -- hopefully next year". Jeremy Enigk added on an online interview that the band has been "talking about becoming a recording band: only record and not tour". Enigk also plans to release the next album on Lewis Hollow Recordings, his own record label.

In December 2008, Enigk offered an update on the proposed live Fire Theft DVD project:

We sent it into a place and had a meeting with some guys about gathering all this material and editing it. I really don't know what's going on with that. That was about a year ago, and I haven't really heard anything about it since. I think the reason why is because they're sort of doing it pro bono. Also, there's so much material, because it's not just a live DVD anymore. The guy Maury (Duchamp), who was filming it unfortunately passed away, but he toured with us for quite a while. And filmed tons of shows, tons of interviews with us, and some backstage stuff. We figured we should probably do something more like he had in mind, more of a bigger documentary of the whole thing. So it ended up becoming a bigger project than we anticipated. And mainly to stick to what Maury wanted, in memory of him. He wanted to do a full-on documentary, but he wanted it to span over a long time.

Following the reunion of Sunny Day Real Estate in 2009 with all four original members, the situation of the band remained uncertain. Enigk admitted at the time, that if Sunny Day Real Estate were to stay together, there would have been little purpose in the Fire Theft regrouping.

== Discography ==
=== Studio album ===
Release date	Title	Label
September 23, 2003	The Fire Theft	Rykodisc

=== EP ===
Release date	Title	Label
January 13, 2004	Hands on You EP	Rykodisc

=== Single ===
Release date	Title	Label
2003	"Chain"	Rykodisc
