= Sunny Day Real Estate =

American rock band

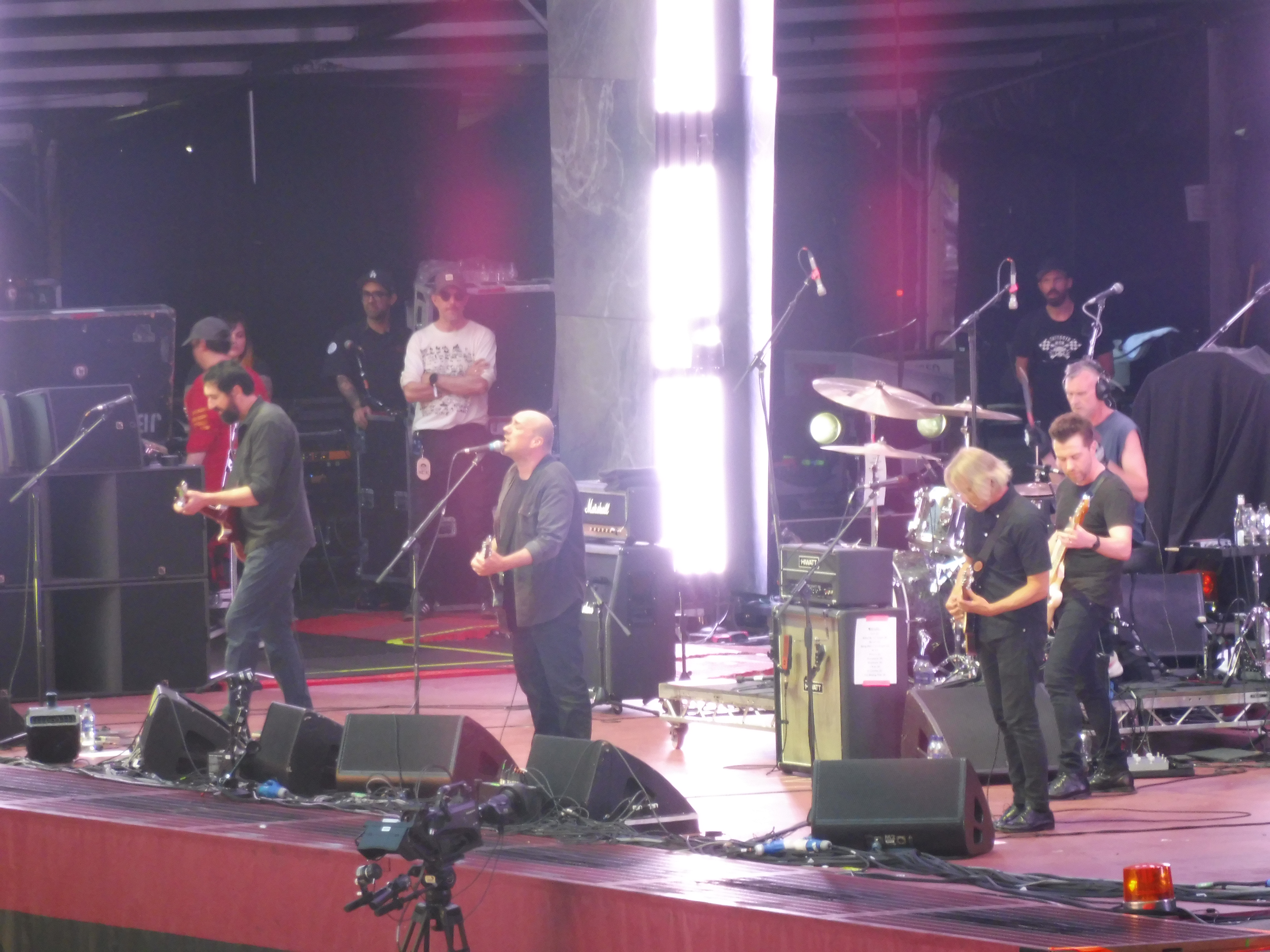
- Sunny Day Real Estate performing in 2026

Background information
- Origin: Seattle, Washington, U.S.
- Genres: Emo; alternative rock; post-hardcore; indie rock
- Works: Discography
- Years active: 1992–1995; 1997–2001; 2009–2011; 2022–present
- Labels: Sub Pop; Time Bomb
- Spinoffs: The Fire Theft; Foo Fighters
- Members: Dan Hoerner; William Goldsmith; Jeremy Enigk; Greg Suran; Chris Jordan
- Past members: Nate Mendel; Jeff Palmer; Joe Skyward

Sunny Day Real Estate is an American rock band from Seattle, Washington, formed in 1992. The band currently consists of founding members Jeremy Enigk (vocals, guitar), Dan Hoerner (guitar) and William Goldsmith (drums), alongside Greg Suran (guitar), who originally played with the band between 2000 and 2001, and Chris Jordan (bass), who joined the band in 2022. Founding bass guitarist Nate Mendel was a member of the band during three of its four incarnations.

Sunny Day Real Estate was one of the early rock bands in the Midwest emo scene which it helped establish, despite the members' not being from the Midwest themselves. In 1994, the band released its debut album, Diary, on Sub Pop Records to critical acclaim. However, shortly after recording its second album, LP2, the band broke up. Rhythm section Mendel and Goldsmith joined Foo Fighters, while lead vocalist and guitarist Enigk embarked on a solo career.

In 1997, they regrouped long enough to record two more studio albums and a live album, but ultimately disbanded once again in 2001. The band reunited again in 2009. Bassist Nate Mendel, who chose to remain with Foo Fighters during the previous reunion in 1997, took part in this reunion. In a 2013 interview with MusicRadar, Mendel said Sunny Day Real Estate was inactive. According to Mendel, the band attempted to record a full-length album after the end of their reunion tour, but the sessions "just fell apart". In 2014 the band released one song from those sessions, "Lipton Witch," on a split 7-inch vinyl with Circa Survive on Record Store Day.

In January 2022, the band announced its third reunion, with Chris Jordan replacing Mendel on bass guitar. The band embarked on a tour with the Appleseed Cast in September 2022.

== History ==
=== Early years ===
In 1992, guitarist Dan Hoerner and bassist Nate Mendel met when they became housemates at the University of Washington. After jam sessions, they decided to form a band and sought a drummer, eventually deciding to invite William Goldsmith. Goldsmith played in many bands but decided to join the duo's project. They went by 3 names before settling on Sunny Day Real Estate.They released a demo tape under the name "Empty Set". Post-release, the band changed their name from Empty Set to Chewbacca Kaboom, upon realization that a band with the name Empty Set already existed. However, when another demo tape was released, the new name earned them little attention, and it was yet again subject to change, this time to One Day I Stopped Breathing. The band eventually settled on the name Sunny Day Real Estate. Mendel stated the band's name "was just a random thought that popped into my head that came from a Talking Heads song, '(Nothing But) Flowers'". He felt that since the band's outlook on the world saw that every possible thing was becoming a commodity to be bought and sold, it was possible that one day, people would even start selling sunny days. The lyrics made him ponder what could be sold as property, and come up with the commercialization of sunny days.

The newly baptized band started as an instrumental outfit, but decided to add a singer. After testing with a female vocalist, Hoerner decided to start singing. The band recorded a self-released two-song 7-inch single called Flatland Spider. Afterwards Mendel took a break to tour with local band Christ on a Crutch. Goldsmith called his high school friend Jeremy Enigk to play along with them in a new project, Thief, Steal Me a Peach, in which Hoerner played bass and Enigk played guitar. After Mendel returned from tour, Hoerner convinced him to let Enigk join Sunny Day Real Estate on vocals and guitar.

=== Diary, self-titled and break-up ===
The band's debut album, Diary, released by indie label Sub Pop in 1994, was greeted with numerous positive reviews. Sub Pop had signed the band after Sub Pop co-founder Jonathan Poneman saw them at a May 1993 show in Seattle. That September, the band performed lead single "Seven" on an episode of The Jon Stewart Show. A few days later, they taped several songs for MTV's 120 Minutes. Through November and December, the band undertook a US tour with Shudder to Think and Soul Coughing in support of the album.

The band projected an enigmatic presence to the public. While supporting Diary, the band allowed only one publicity photo and granted just a single interview (though, strangely, the band posed for an advertisement for department-store chain Nordstrom). In a 1998 interview with Norm Arenas of Texas Is the Reason, Hoerner explained that the band made up a fake band name and brought in a fake lead singer for the ad shoot, only to have the store stick their real band name on the ad. For most of its early days, the band also refused to play a show in California, for reasons that were never fully explained. When the band was asked to perform at the 1994 Almost Acoustic Christmas in Los Angeles for radio station KROQ, Hoerner refused to join them, leaving Enigk, Mendel, and Goldsmith to perform the show as a trio.

After finishing their 1994 US tour, the band regrouped to begin recording the follow-up to Diary. While the events surrounding the sessions have not been publicly discussed, the band was clearly enduring internal conflict. Rumors abounded that the root cause was Enigk's sudden conversion to Christianity. In early 1995, the band announced that it was disbanding. William Goldsmith would later reveal in June 2020 on the "This Was The Scene" podcast that the band had already decided to split up before their first US tour in 1994 and the recording of the Pink Album.

There was much talk but little really known about the reasons for the break-up. While many fans focused on Enigk being a reborn Christian, Enigk and other band members later downplayed that aspect. In a letter addressed "To Seth and other readers", Enigk responded to rumors regarding his faith. Dismissing the connection between his conversion and their break-up, Enigk wrote, "I took a shot on calling upon God. He answered me. My pain was gone. I was full of joy. I had hope again. I must say that the true God is the one who is in the Bible, Jesus Christ," and, "I would be a fool to say that He hasn't worked miracles in my life." Goldsmith would later reveal the break up was mainly due to their lack of success and Enigk's desire to leave the band.

In November 1995, Sub Pop released the band's second album, bearing only the label Sunny Day Real Estate. The album was released without cover art or liner notes, and was distributed by Sub Pop as LP2. It has also occasionally been referred to as "The Pink Album", a reference to its solid pink cover. When Sub Pop contacted the band for artwork for the release, the band had nothing to offer, so Goldsmith suggested that they "make it pink". The album included the songs recorded during the brief sessions, as well as tracks such as "Rodeo Jones" that were recorded during the sessions for Diary.

Enigk confessed in an interview in December 2008 that because the band had already broken up during the recording of LP2, he and Hoerner never sat down to complete the lyrics; "We broke up and we just felt like we were done. We put no energy into the artwork or into anything. On a lot of songs, there aren't lyrics! In a lot of cases, we never sat down to write them, because we just wanted to get it out of the way as fast as possible. So I just sang a lot of gibberish, which makes it really quirky. My favorite is the Japanese translations".

After the breakup, Enigk pursued a solo career, releasing his first solo album, Return of the Frog Queen, in 1996. Hoerner moved out to a farm in rural Washington, while Mendel and Goldsmith joined Foo Fighters, the band which Nirvana drummer Dave Grohl had formed following the death of Kurt Cobain. In 1997, following a dispute with Grohl during the sessions for the second Foo Fighters record, Goldsmith departed the band, but Mendel remained.

=== Reformation, How It Feels to Be Something On, The Rising Tide and second break-up ===
In 1997, Sub Pop began pressing Enigk and Hoerner about the possibility of releasing a rarities record of Sunny Day Real Estate material, including the band's early 7-inch releases and otherwise unreleased songs, such as the band's unused contribution to The Crow: City of Angels soundtrack. Given that the album with only this material would have been rather short, the band decided to regroup to record a few new songs. While working on the songs, the quartet realized that whatever had driven them apart was behind them, and decided to continue working on new material, eventually signaling to Sub Pop that they wanted to release a full new album. Initially, Mendel intended to quit the Foo Fighters to rejoin Sunny Day full-time, but hedged for several months on actually quitting. Just before starting the recording sessions for the album, Mendel turned down the opportunity, noting that he did not want to leave what he had with the Foo Fighters for a potentially tenuous reunion.

In September 1998, the band released How It Feels to Be Something On. For the album, the remaining trio replaced Mendel with Jeff Palmer, formerly of the Mommyheads. Palmer left the band after a short time, and he was replaced by Joe Skyward. The title track and "Every Shining Time You Arrive" were intended for Enigk's second solo album, but later became Sunny Day Real Estate songs. On the album, Hoerner took the opportunity to write about his environmental concerns in "100 Million".

While supporting the album, Sub Pop approached them about the possibility of filming the band for a live release. Two shows were documented, one on video and one on audio, in the form of Live. In the weeks after their release, the band noted their displeasure with the video and CD, complaining that Sub Pop did not allow them final approval on the artwork or on the final mixes. Having fulfilled their contractual obligations, the band left the label.

The band's manager Greg Williamson departed, and the band signed with Time Bomb Recordings, an independent label distributed by BMG. The band joined with long-time Hüsker Dü sound engineer Lou Giordano to record The Rising Tide, released in June 2000. The band had high expectations for the release, and subsequently undertook a lengthy US tour. Afterward, the band announced their breakup.

=== Post-second split activity, second reunion, aborted fifth album, third reunion ===
After their second disbanding, Hoerner again retreated to his farm in Washington, eventually working with Chris Carrabba on tracks for Dashboard Confessional.

In 2001, Enigk and Goldsmith reunited with Mendel to form a new band, called The Fire Theft, releasing their first self-titled album in 2003. While they had the option of retaining the Sunny Day Real Estate name, the trio decided that it was time to leave the past behind them and start fresh. Mendel remained with the Foo Fighters, joining the Fire Theft when his schedule allowed it.

In 2006, Enigk reignited his solo career by recording and releasing the LP World Waits on his own label, Lewis Hollow Records. Following the October 17 release, Enigk embarked upon a supporting solo tour of the U.S. using material from his 2006 release, as well as his decade-prior solo album, Return of the Frog Queen.

After some speculation in 2006 and 2008, in April 2009, several web sites reported that the band had reunited with all original members. The reunion was confirmed in June 2009, by Seattle radio DJ Andrew Harms from 107.7 The End. The band toured the United States and Canada in September and October 2009, and Australia in February 2010 as part of the Soundwave Festival. The band's first show was a surprise secret show on September 16, 2009, at Hell's Kitchen in Tacoma, Washington. To coincide with the new tour, the band's first two albums were remastered and reissued with bonus tracks and newly written liner notes.

For their 2009 reunion tour, the band frequently played a newly written song called "10".

On September 29, 2009, the band performed the song "Seven" on Late Night with Jimmy Fallon. The band also performed at the 2010 Coachella Valley Music and Arts Festival, and went on to play their first ever European gig on May 29 at Barcelona's Primavera Sound. After that, they played at the HMV Forum in London for their debut UK gig on May 31. They were also scheduled to play at the punk festival Groezrock in Belgium as part of a European tour, but had to cancel their date due to the volcanic ash situation.

In 2009, the band had been making statements from the stage implying that new recorded material was on the way. In early 2010, Dan Hoerner confirmed in an interview with Australian music website FasterLouder that the band were writing a new album, and were expecting to start recording in May 2010. Mendel ultimately returned to recording and touring with Foo Fighters.

In a 2013 interview with MusicRadar, Mendel stated that Sunny Day Real Estate was inactive. According to Mendel, the band attempted to record a new full length after the end of their reunion tour, but the sessions "just fell apart."

In 2014, the band released a split 7-inch vinyl with Circa Survive on Record Store Day. The band's only song from the 7-inch, "Lipton Witch," was their first new material released in 14 years.

In December 2018, William Goldsmith claimed on his Facebook page that the unfinished fifth Sunny Day Real Estate album remained "silenced, abandoned and buried within the murkiest depths of David Grohl's sock drawer." He would later clarify that he was referring to the Grohl-owned Studio 606 where the album sessions took place and were abandoned due to Jeremy Enigk not receiving "the moral support as well as engineering that he deserved." Goldsmith also claimed that Grohl disapproved of Nate Mendel's involvement in the Fire Theft, and thus would not be supportive of Mendel completing the new Sunny Day Real Estate LP. Via Foo Fighters' representatives, Mendel denied Goldsmith's initial allegations, to which Goldsmith replied that he had not spoken with Mendel since 2011 after a planned conference call to discuss finishing the album did not happen.

In January 2022, a new Instagram page for Sunny Day Real Estate was set up by Goldsmith, leading to speculation that a fourth reunion of the band was imminent. This was confirmed by Spin on January 24, 2022 – with Enigk, Hoerner and Goldsmith confirmed to be involved. A North American tour with the Appleseed Cast was announced in May 2022. On September 10, Sunny Day Real Estate played their first show of this reunion at The Big Dipper (a venue co-owned by Hoerner) in Spokane.

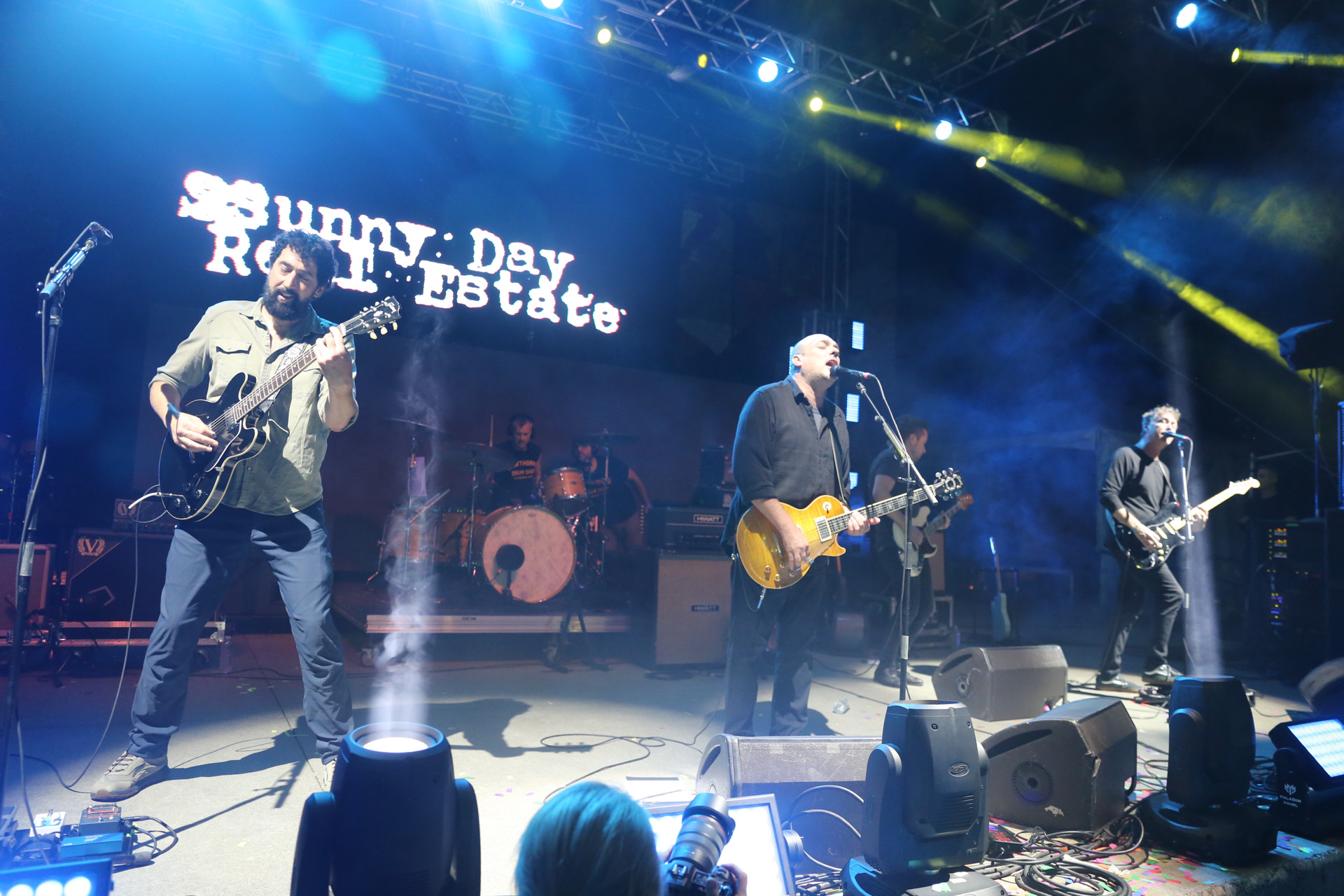
Sunny Day Real Estate performs at Bumbershoot in Seattle in 2023.

On January 17, 2024, an Instagram Reel was posted to the group's page teasing new music featuring a drawing of a tugboat while a snippet of an unreleased song played in the background. The song “Novum Vetus” was released on January 27; it was revealed that the song originated during the recording sessions for How It Feels to Be Something On. The song was recorded by the three original members of the band, plus their new members, bassist Chris Jordan and guitarist Greg Suran.

In July 2026, Sunny Day Real Estate returned to the United Kingdom for 4 shows including an appearance at 2000 Trees Festival, Wembley Stadium as special guests to My Chemical Romance, and headline shows in London and Manchester. On August 6th, the artist made their Irish debut with a very intimate appearance at The Grand Social Dublin.

== Musical style and legacy ==
Sunny Day Real Estate has primarily been classified as emo, and according to Brian Raftery of AllMusic, the band present "more than a hint of grunge". Other musical genres used to describe the band's music include alternative rock, post-hardcore, post-punk, indie rock, and post-grunge. The band's sound is characterized by "gnarled" guitar work and Jeremy Enigk's explicitly emotional vocal performances.

The band's influences included Dischord Records bands, Rites of Spring, Shudder to Think, Embrace, Nation of Ulysses, Nirvana, Screaming Trees, Dinosaur Jr., U2, Nomeansno, Christ on a Crutch, the Hated, Treepeople, Lungfish and Fugazi. Where Hoerner's vocal style had been in the rougher, hardcore vein, Enigk's vocals were higher-pitched, inspired by Shudder to Think singer Craig Wedren. The musicians also decided to add slower tempos and more groove to their songs. The band's new style went on to shape what music fans and journalists alike consider the "indie-emo sound." Emotional hardcore, a style initiated in the late 1980s, saw a divergence in sound with bands like Sunny Day Real Estate who strayed away from the hardcore tendencies of original emotional hardcore or emo while keeping some of the intensity and stylistic motifs.

Sunny Day Real Estate are regarded as "one of the prime influences on the rise of emo punk". Numerous bands and artists have cited Sunny Day Real Estate as an influence, including Dashboard Confessional, Hawthorne Heights, the Get Up Kids, Thursday, Piebald, and Justin Pierre of Motion City Soundtrack. As of 2008, Diary was the seventh best-selling album released on Sub Pop, having sold more than 231,000 copies. In 2013, Diary took the first place in LA Weekly's list "Top 20 Emo Albums in History". In 2016, Diary also topped the Rolling Stone list "40 Greatest Emo Albums of All Time".

== Band members ==
=== Current ===
- Dan Hoerner – guitar (1992–1995, 1997–2001, 2009–2014, 2022–present), backing vocals (1993–1995, 1997–2001, 2009–2014, 2022–present), bass (1999–2000), lead vocals (1992–1993)
- William Goldsmith – drums, percussion (1992–1995, 1997–2001, 2009–2014, 2022–present), backing vocals (1999–2000)
- Jeremy Enigk – lead vocals, guitar (1993–1995, 1997–2001, 2009–2014, 2022–present); keyboards (1997–2000, 2024-present); bass (1999–2000)
- Greg Suran – guitar (2000–2001; touring, 2022–present), keyboards (2000–2001; touring), backing vocals (2022–present)
- Chris Jordan – bass (2022–present)

=== Former ===
- Nate Mendel – bass (1992–1995, 1997–1998, 2009–2014)
- Jeff Palmer – bass (1998)
- Joe Skyward – bass, backing vocals(1998–1999; died 2016)

=== Touring ===
- Nick Macri – bass (2000–2001)
- Jason Narducy – rhythm guitar, backing vocals (2022, 2024, 2026; substitute for Greg Suran)

== Discography ==
- Diary (1994)
- Sunny Day Real Estate (1995)
- How It Feels to Be Something On (1998)
- The Rising Tide (2000)
