= Diary (Sunny Day Real Estate album) =

Studio album by Sunny Day Real Estate
- Released: May 10, 1994
- Recorded: November 1993
- Studios: Idful, Chicago, Illinois
- Genres: Emo; post-hardcore; indie rock
- Length: 52:47
- Label: Sub Pop
- Producer: Brad Wood

Sunny Day Real Estate chronology
Diary (1994)	Sunny Day Real Estate (1995)

Singles from Diary
- 1. "Seven" Released: 1994; 2. "In Circles" Released: 1994

Diary is the debut studio album by American rock band Sunny Day Real Estate, released on May 10, 1994. The album is considered by many to be a defining emo album of the second wave, and key in the development of its subgenre Midwest emo. It has also been called the "missing link" between post-hardcore and the nascent emo genre.

Diary was remastered and reissued in 2009, with bonus tracks "8" and "9" from their 1993 7-inch Thief, Steal Me a Peach and newly written liner notes.

== Background and writing ==
The songlist started with six tracks written by Thief, Steal Me a Peach, a project started when bassist Nate Mendel went on tour with his other project Christ on a Crutch, and drummer William Goldsmith invited his friend Jeremy Enigk to jam with him and guitarist and then singer Dan Hoerner. The first songs afterwards had titles regarding their order in composing - "Seven", "8" and "9", though only the first appeared on Diary. The band had a tradition of numbering songs for title long before Jeremy's arrival.

"In Circles" was initially intended as a solo acoustic song which Enigk would release on the band's label One Day I Stopped Breathing, which changed when the rest of the band took a liking to it and decided to rework it into a full band song.

== Music and lyrics ==
Brad Nelson of Pitchfork assessed: "Sunny Day Real Estate’s 1994 debut on Sub Pop can be read in various ways: in the form of punk rock evolving away from its original designs into more dynamic and insecure space, or as a display of spiralling interplay between four talented musicians from Seattle."

Nelson characterized Jeremy Enigk's vocals on the album as a "burned whine." He explained: "[Enigk's] struggle to access notes and the half-mutated scream it produces is a fluke, one that helped spur on the many second-wave emo acts to follow."

According to Hoerner and Enigk, "Round", and in particular its main riff, was "heavily influenced" by indie rock band Treepeople. "48" and "Grendel" both feature octave guitar parts inspired by Fugazi. U2 was also a significant influence on Enigk and Hoerner, with Hoerner in particular noting that much of his guitarwork on the album was a result of trying to mimic the Edge's use of delay without employing a delay pedal.

Enigk has stated that "the entire record is inspired by a high school girlfriend that broke my heart daily." In particular, the line from "Sometimes", "Although you hit me hard, I come back," reflects the on and off nature of their relationship. The lyrics to "Grendel" were inspired by John Gardner's 1971 novel of the same name.

== Artwork ==
The artwork of the album was almost entirely done by Chris Thompson. However, the "butterfly" drawing on the album's booklet was created by Nate Mendel's father, John Mendel. The album cover features figures similar to those of popular children's toy Little People.

== Release ==
The album was released on CD, vinyl and cassette. The vinyl has been released in three limited edition pressings, all of which are out of print. The first was a multi-colored splatter vinyl, released on Glitterhouse Records in Germany. The second was a black vinyl pressing on Sub Pop. A repress followed on green vinyl (and possibly a second black pressing), but the label for this second pressing states "Edition II" under the Sub Pop logo. All three vinyl pressings are missing 3 songs that are present on the CD, possibly due to the time constraints of vinyl, as the album clocks in at 53 minutes. The missing songs are "Round", "48" and "Grendel". The 2009 double LP re-issue contains all 11 songs from the original album, and two bonus tracks.

== Reception and legacy ==
Professional ratings
Review scores
Source	Rating
AllMusic	4/5 stars
The A.V. Club	A
Drowned in Sound	8/10
Pitchfork	8.7/10
PopMatters	9/10
Q	3/5 stars
Record Collector	4/5 stars
The Rolling Stone Album Guide	3/5 stars

Diary was different from those released by popular Seattle grunge bands at the time, showcasing a melodic, yet urgent sound. Its influence has been observed in the works of subsequent releases in the genre. Despite being the only album by the band not to chart, it has since become the seventh best-selling album released on Sub Pop, having sold more than 231,000 copies. In a retrospective article about the 40 greatest emo albums of all time, Rolling Stone ranked Diary at number 1 and wrote that Diary "captures the vague inner-turmoil of Enigk's lyrics and propels those turbulent emotions to the heavens."

AllMusic said, "In retrospect, Diary doesn't quite fulfill all of its ambitions -- there are a few under-focused moments that don't achieve the epic sweep of the album's best compositions. [...] But even if it isn't quite the top-to-bottom masterpiece its legions of imitators suggest, Diary still ranks as arguably the definitive '90s emo album, and an indispensable introduction to the genre."

Diary has also appeared on best-of emo album lists by Junkee, Kerrang!, LA Weekly, and NME, as well as by journalists Leslie Simon and Trevor Kelley, in their book Everybody Hurts: An Essential Guide to Emo Culture (2007). The album was ranked at number 155 on Spin's "The 300 Best Albums of the Past 30 Years (1985–2014)" list. Ian Cohen from Pitchfork wrote that "it's the terse yet tender delivery of the lyrics from Jeremy Enigk that ultimately drew people in." In 2020, Vulture ranked "Seven" and "In Circles" as the 5th and 11th greatest emo songs of all time, respectively.

Sleater-Kinney singer-guitarist Carrie Brownstein has praised the album, stating "[t]he songs were unafraid to be beautiful, shameless in their grandiosity, their reaching and their tenderness. The playing was tighter than on other albums coming out of the Pacific Northwest, pristine but not inaccessible." Dashboard Confessional frontman Chris Carrabba has said that Diary "really caught my ear and got me thinking, ‘This is what I want to do.'"

"Seven" was featured in Guitar Hero 5, and it was also released on the Rock Band Network on July 5, 2010. Additionally the song appears in the South Park episode "Goth Kids 3: Dawn of the Posers." "47" is heard over the closing credits in the 1997 movie Drive, She Said and in 2022 was featured in the third season of For All Mankind

== Track listing ==
All lyrics are written by Jeremy Enigk and Dan Hoerner; all music is composed by Sunny Day Real Estate.

No.	Title	Length
1.	"Seven"	4:45
2.	"In Circles"	4:58
3.	"Song About an Angel"	6:14
4.	"Round"	4:10
5.	"47"	4:34
6.	"The Blankets Were the Stairs"	5:27
7.	"Pheurton Skeurto"	2:33
8.	"Shadows"	4:46
9.	"48"	4:46
10.	"Grendel"	4:53
11.	"Sometimes"	5:43
Total length:		52:52

Reissue bonus tracks
No.	Title	Length
12.	"8"	5:15
13.	"9"	6:03
Total length:		64:10

== Personnel ==
Personnel adapted from Diary liner notes.

Sunny Day Real Estate

- Jeremy Enigk – vocals, guitar
- Dan Hoerner – guitar, backing vocals
- Nate Mendel – bass guitar
- William Goldsmith – drums

Additional personnel

- Brad Wood – producer, engineer, mixing
- M. Casey Rice – assistant engineer, additional guitar (Note: Credited with additional guitar on one song, although the song is not specified)
- Adam Kasper – mastering at Bad Animals
- Lynn Hamrick – photography
- Chris Thompson – artwork
- John Mendel – butterfly drawing
