= How It Feels to Be Something On =

Studio album by Sunny Day Real Estate
- Released: September 8, 1998
- Recorded: March 10 – April 26, 1998
- Studio: Robert Lang Studios (Seattle)
- Genres: Emo; indie rock
- Length: 45:44
- Label: Sub Pop
- Producer: Greg Williamson

Sunny Day Real Estate chronology
Sunny Day Real Estate (1995)	How It Feels to Be Something On (1998)	Live (1999)

Singles from How It Feels to Be Something On
- 1. "Pillars" Released: 1998; 2. "How It Feels to Be Something On" Released: 1998

Professional ratings
Review scores
Source	Rating
AllMusic	4/5 stars
Pitchfork	9.3/10 (1998); 8.8/10 (2016)
The Rolling Stone Album Guide	4/5 stars
Tiny Mix Tapes	5/5 stars

How It Feels to Be Something On is the third studio album by American rock band Sunny Day Real Estate, and the first following their 1997 reunion. It was released September 8, 1998.

== Reissue ==
In 2016, Sub Pop announced that they would reissue How It Feels to Be Something On on different audio formats. It was officially released on August 5, 2016 and has led to renewed interest in the record, including a Pitchfork 2016 re-review. The album peaked at number 7 on the Billboard Vinyl Albums chart.

== Track listing ==
All tracks are written by Sunny Day Real Estate.

No.	Title	Length
1.	"Pillars"	4:57
2.	"Roses in Water"	3:42
3.	"Every Shining Time You Arrive"	4:13
4.	"Two Promises"	4:39
5.	"100 Million"	5:38
6.	"How It Feels to Be Something On"	3:57
7.	"The Prophet"	5:13
8.	"Guitar and Video Games"	4:09
9.	"The Shark's Own Private Fuck"	4:03
10.	"Days Were Golden"	5:08

== Personnel ==
=== Sunny Day Real Estate ===
- Jeremy Enigk – vocals, guitar, keyboards
- Dan Hoerner – guitar
- Jeff Palmer – bass guitar
- William Goldsmith – drums, percussion

=== Production ===
- Greg Williamson – producer, engineer, mixing
- Aaron Warner – assistant engineer
- Chip Butters – assistant engineer
- Eric Janko – assistant engineer
- Steve Culp – assistant engineer
- Adam Kasper – mixing
- Pat Sample – mixing assistant
- Greg Calbi – mastering
- Dan Hoerner – cover art design
- Chris Thompson – artwork

== Charts ==
Chart (1998)	Peak position
US Billboard 200	132

Chart (2016)	Peak position
US Vinyl Albums (Billboard)	7
