= Time Bomb Recordings =

- Founded: 1995
- Defunct: 2019
- Status: Defunct
- Distributor(s): Arista Records (1995-2000); BMG (2000-2005); RED Distribution (2005-2007)
- Genre: Punk rock
- Country of origin: U.S.

Time Bomb Recordings was a Laguna Beach, California-based independent record label, founded in 1995 by artist manager Jim Guerinot in a joint-venture agreement with Arista Records. In the following five years, the artist roster grew to encompass a variety of musical genres (punk, indie, rockabilly); generally falling under the label "alternative rock". When the Arista agreement expired in 2000, Time Bomb signed with BMG Distribution. The label has also existed mostly to administer its back catalog and is currently distributed by RED Distribution (whose parent, Sony Music Entertainment, absorbed BMG). Time Bomb continued to release new albums in physical form until 2007, with the release of Social Distortion's Greatest Hits compilation album. Social Distortion would later sign to Epitaph, and Time Bomb did not release any new music in over half a decade.

In 2014, Time Bomb was revived with the release of Summer Nationals, an EP of three song covers by The Offspring on iTunes and Spotify. The label has since released more music by The Offspring, including their 2015 number one hit "Coming for You", as well as the band's 2018 cover version of 311's "Down".

In 2019, Time Bomb Recordings was acquired by Concord Music Company.

== Former artists ==
- Amazing Crowns
- Animal Chin
- The Aquabats
- Ball
- Berlin
- Black Days
- Chlorine
- Crumbox
- Death in Vegas
- Disappointment Inc
- The Elevator Drops
- Indigo Swing
- Lionrock
- Litany
- No Knife
- The Offspring
- Quarashi
- Mike Ness
- The Reverend Horton Heat
- Screamfeeder
- Peter Searcy
- Starling
- Social Distortion
- Soul Circle
- Sunny Day Real Estate
- Tenderloin
- The Vandals
- The Waking Hours
- Wellwater Conspiracy

== Compilations ==
- Hell Comes to Your House
- Idle Hands Soundtrack
- The Best of KROQ Almost Acoustic Christmas
- Live At The Hootenanny

== See also ==
- List of record labels
