= Dan Hoerner =

American guitarist, vocalist and author (born 1969)

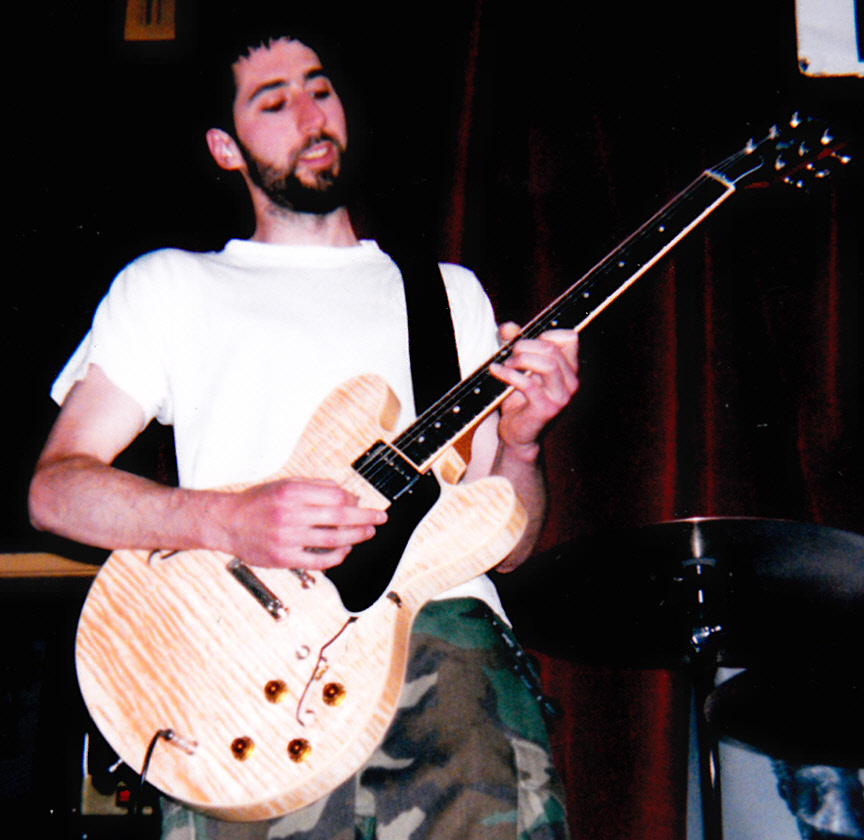
- Hoerner performing in June 2000

Background information
- Born: May 13, 1969 (age 57)
- Origin: Spokane, Washington, United States
- Genres: Emo, alternative rock, indie rock
- Occupations: Singer, guitarist
- Instruments: Vocals, guitar, bass
- Years active: 1992–present

Dan Hoerner (born May 13, 1969) is an American guitarist, vocalist and author. He is known for being the lead guitarist and backing vocalist of the Seattle-based band Sunny Day Real Estate.

== Music career ==
Hoerner was a fan of hardcore punk and post-hardcore bands, and decided to become a musician after attending a concert of Fugazi. Hoerner became the housemate of bassist Nate Mendel while attending the University of Washington, and they formed the band which would later become Sunny Day Real Estate. After being joined by drummer William Goldsmith, they started the band Empty Set. After the band recorded a two song demo, they changed their name to Chewbacca Kaboom, and band recorded a six song demo under that name. Later, the band once again changed their name to One Day I Stopped Breathing. Finally, the band settled on the name Sunny Day Real Estate.

From the band's founding as Empty Set until after releasing the songs "Flatland Spider" and "The Onlies" as Sunny Day Real Estate, Dan Hoerner was the band's lead vocalist as well as rhythm guitarist and keyboardist. Jeremy Enigk eventually took over on lead vocals from Dan Hoerner. However, Dan continued to supply back up vocals, as well as performing as the band's lead guitarist.

After releasing two albums, the group disbanded. During this time, Hoerner had moved to a farm in rural Washington. The group reformed in 1998 (minus original bassist Nate Mendel, now of Foo Fighters), releasing two more albums before disbanding again.

Three original members of Sunny Day Real Estate had a quasi-reunion in the early 2000s as The Fire Theft. Hoerner was not involved.

In June 2009, it was confirmed that Sunny Day Real Estate would be reuniting once again, and the band toured extensively in the U.S.A., playing on the Jimmy Fallon Show, as well as playing shows in Barcelona and London.

In 2014, Hoerner revived The Big Dipper, a historic live music venue in Spokane, WA. The venue is presently open, and hosts music a wide range of music including heavy metal, EDM, jazz, indie, and punk.

Hoerner can be heard on the EP So Impossible by Dashboard Confessional.

Hoerner also scored a short film by Rohit Colin Rao called "Someone and Someone, Inc."

== Author ==
Dan authored a book, The Little Monkey Chronicles, ISBN 0-9707273-0-5, a collection of short stories illustrated by Chris Thompson and published by Clearly the Underdog Publishing. In addition, in 1999 Hoerner and John Despirito co-founded the now defunct online art community called The Art Conspiracy. The Art Conspiracy was an early social media platform that contained many elements later incorporated into sites like Myspace and Facebook. At its peak, The Art Conspiracy hosted more than 500,000 users.
