= Jeremy Enigk =

American musician

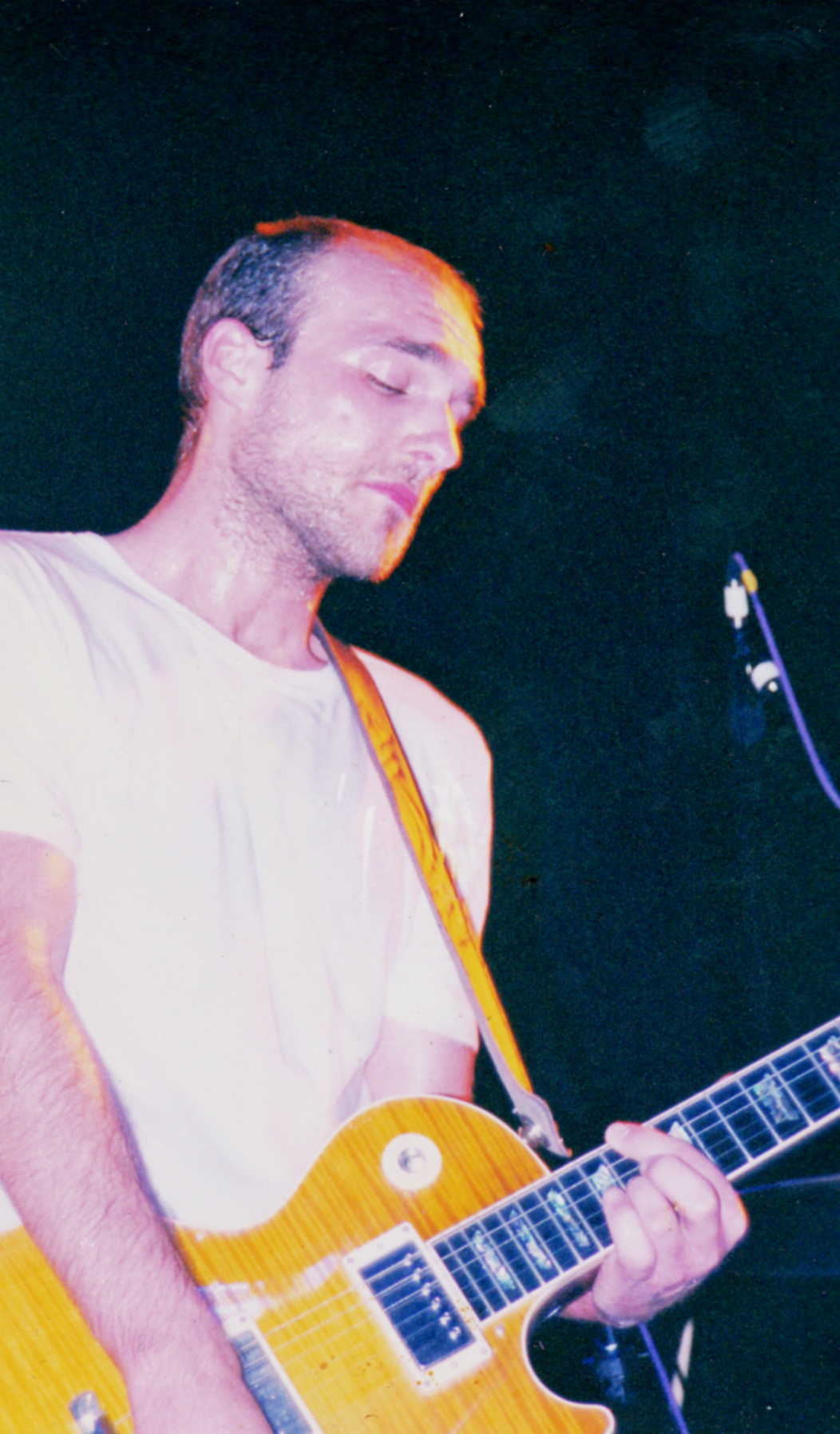
- Enigk performing in 2000

Background information
- Born: July 16, 1974 (age 52)
- Origin: Seattle, Washington, U.S.
- Occupations: Singer, songwriter
- Instruments: Vocals, guitar, piano, glockenspiel, bass, drums
- Years active: 1992–present
- Member of: Sunny Day Real Estate
- Formerly of: The Fire Theft
- Website: jeremyenigk.com

Jeremy Enigk (/ˈiːnɪk/ EE-nik; born July 16, 1974) is an American singer-songwriter, vocalist and guitarist/multi-instrumentalist. He is known as a solo artist, a film score composer, and as the lead vocalist, rhythm guitarist and keyboardist of the Seattle-based bands Sunny Day Real Estate and The Fire Theft.

== Biography ==
=== Poor Old Lu, Sunny Day Real Estate, and first solo projects (1993–2000) ===
Enigk was born in Seattle, Washington, to Gary E. Enigk and Sherry Hammond Enigk. In the late 1980s, Enigk was part of what would eventually become Poor Old Lu, sharing vocalist duties with Scott Hunter. He joined the group Sunny Day Real Estate, where he served as lead singer, co-songwriter, rhythm guitarist and keyboardist. The group released two albums in 1994–1995 and then broke up; during the band's first break-up (spanning 1995–97), Enigk released the 1996 solo album, Return of the Frog Queen, and rejoined Poor Old Lu for a single track in 1996, singing alongside Scott on the band's Straight Six EP, on the track, "Digging Deep.". Enigk converted to Christianity in the mid-1990s. There was an aborted attempt to record a second Sub Pop album, a follow-up to Return of the Frog Queen as Enigk explains, "We started a 2nd solo record and actually recorded one song with Anita Perkins and some of the other string players. That was the first attempt that I ever had at completely writing all the music myself, without Mark Nichols who did 'Return of the Frog Queen' with me. But that was the only song. And then, shortly after that Sunny Day got back together, and all my songs that were meant to be for a solo record were moved to Sunny Day Real Estate. Some of the songs on How It Feels actually." In 1997, Sunny Day Real Estate returned, with the first line-up, when bassist Nate Mendel left the band, Enigk moved to the bass (he also played guitar and keyboards in studio), the band released two more studio albums, the last one (The Rising Tide, 2000) without a contribution of Nate Mendel.

=== The Fire Theft and solo work (2001–present) ===
After Sunny Day Real Estate's second breakup in 2001, Enigk formed The Fire Theft, with former Sunny Day Real Estate members Goldsmith and Mendel. They released a self-titled album in 2003 and an EP in 2004 before breaking up.

He composed original songs for the 2003 film The United States of Leland. In 2006, he followed Frog Queen with another solo album, World Waits on his own label, Lewis Hollow Records. A song from the album, "Been Here Before," was included as an MP3 with Winamp.

In June 2009, Sunny Day Real Estate reunited once again with the original line-up and toured the United States. But after some fruitless recording sessions, the band became inactive again.

On February 9, 2015, he announced a US tour focusing mainly on East and West coast venues. It was later revealed in March 2015 that the tour was the first step towards raising the necessary funds for an upcoming new album. On March 28, 2015 he announced a crowdfunding campaign via the Pledgemusic website that was expected to also support the release of the upcoming new album.

Enigk largely remained inactive aside from a solo album release, until early 2022 when it was announced that Sunny Day Real Estate would reunite for a winter tour of the United States.

== Legacy ==
Sunny Day Real Estate, especially Enigk, are often cited as progenitors of second-wave emo.

== Discography ==
=== with Sunny Day Real Estate ===
- Diary (1994)
- Sunny Day Real Estate (1995)
- How It Feels to Be Something On (1998)
- The Rising Tide (2000)

=== with The Fire Theft ===
- The Fire Theft (2003)

=== Solo albums ===
- Return of the Frog Queen (1996)
- World Waits (2006)
- The Missing Link (2007)
- OK Bear (2009)
- Ghosts (2017)

=== Live albums ===
- The End Sessions (1996) (5-song live EP)
- Live (1999)

=== Soundtracks ===
- Dream with the Fishes (1997)
- The United States of Leland (2003)

=== Guest appearances ===
- Poor Old Lu – "Answering Machine Message" on Sin (1994)
- Poor Old Lu – "Digging Deep" on Straight Six EP (1995)
- Bare Minimum – "Luchuck" on Can't Cure The Nailbiters (1998)
- Poor Old Lu – "Digging Deep" on In Their Final Performance (1998)
- Thirty Ought Six – "Tourmaline" on Hag Seed (1995)
- mewithoutYou – "The Dryness and the Rain" and "O, Porcupine" on Brother, Sister (2006)
- Sea.Mine – "Me & My William" and "Leave" on Does Anyone Else Miss the Cold War? (2006)
- The Almost – "Dirty and Left Out" on Southern Weather (2007)
- Rosie Thomas – "Paper Doll" and "These Friends of Mine" on These Friends of Mine (2007)
- Pinkston – "Imagine Nation" on Imagine Nation EP (2022)
