= Hootenanny =

Appalachian colloquialism for a musical gathering

A hootenanny is a freewheeling, improvisatory musical event in the United States, often incorporating audience members in performances. It is particularly associated with folk music.

== Etymology ==
=== Meanings ===
Hootenanny is an Appalachian colloquialism that was used in the early twentieth century U.S. as a placeholder name to refer to things whose names were forgotten or unknown. In this usage, it was synonymous with doohickey, thingamajig or whatchamacallit, as in: "That hootenanny that she shovels her bread with—that long-handled majigger, you know" (from Sim Greene: A Narrative of the Whisky Insurrection [1906]).

=== Folk music performance ===
Hootenanny is also a rural word for "party" or get-together. It can refer to a folk music party with an open mic, at which different performers are welcome to get up and play in front of an audience.

According to Pete Seeger he first heard the word hootenanny in Seattle, Washington, in the summer of 1941 while touring the area with Woody Guthrie. It was used by Hugh DeLacy's Washington Commonwealth Federation to describe their monthly music fund raisers. After some debate the club voted in hootenanny, which narrowly beat out wingding. Seeger, Woody Guthrie and other members of the Almanac Singers later used the word in New York City to describe their weekly rent parties, which featured many notable folksingers of the time. In a 1962 interview in Time, Joan Baez made the analogy that a hootenanny is to folk singing what a jam session is to jazz.

== Events ==
During the early 1960s at the height of the American folk music revival, the club Gerdes Folk City at 11 West 4th Street in Greenwich Village started a folk music hootenanny tradition every Monday night. It featured an open mic and welcomed a broad variety of performers. The Bitter End at 147 Bleecker Street—not far from Gerdes—continued the folk music hootenanny tradition every Tuesday night.

A weekly hootenanny has been held during the summers at Allegany State Park most years since 1972.

The Hootenanny was an annual one-day rockabilly music festival held on July 4th weekends from 1995 to 2013 at the Oak Canyon Ranch in Irvine, California. The July 3, 1999 Hootenanny was recorded and released as Live at the Hootenanny, Vol. 1. It featured rockabilly bands like the Reverend Horton Heat, The Derailers, Mike Ness, and the Royal Crown Revue.

For years there have been online hootenannies. The most long-standing example is Small Talk At The Wall, which originated in 1999.

== Recordings ==
- Hootenanny with the Highwaymen is a 1963 album by folk band the Highwaymen.
- "Surfin' Hootenanny" is a surf pop/rock song written by Lee Hazlewood (tune) and Al Casey, and performed by Al Casey with the K-C-Ettes (aka the Blossoms). It opens Casey's 1963 album Surfin' Hootenanny (issued by Sundazed Music Inc.). The song re-appeared in 1996 (in remastered version) on the Cowabunga! Set 2: Big Waves (1963) compilation. Cowabunga! Set 2: Big Waves (1963) is a second disc from Rhino Records' Cowabunga! The Surf Box 4-CD set compilation that contains songs from the four-decade long history of surf music.
- The Glencoves had a hit single with their release "Hootenanny", which peaked at No. 38 on the Billboard Hot 100 in 1963.
- Eels released an album titled Shootenanny! in 2003. The album's title is a portmanteau of the words "shoot" and "hootenanny".
- The rock and roll band the Replacements released their second album in 1983, titled Hootenanny on Twin/Tone Records.
- The band Weezer had a "Hootenanny" tour in 2008 which allowed fans to play songs with the band.
- The New Zealand rock band HLAH released a single entitled "Hootenanny" (which also appears on their 1996 album Double Your Strength, Improve Your Health, & Lengthen Your Life on the Wildside Records label) in 1997.
- A song called "We Are Having a Hootenanny" appears on the Magnetic Fields's 2010 album Realism.
- The album The Repercussions of Angelic Behavior by Rieflin, Gunn and Fripp contains a track titled "Hootenanny At The Pink Pussycat Cafe".
- Reggae legends the Wailers recorded a song called "Hoot Nanny Hoot", sung by Peter Tosh, available on Tosh's CD The Toughest.
- Swedish 1960s folk band Hootenanny Singers included Björn Ulvaeus, who later was a member of ABBA.
- In 1964 George Jones and Melba Montgomery released a country/bluegrass album titled Bluegrass Hootenanny.
- Paul & Paula, who had a big hit with "Hey Paula" in 1963, also released a single later in that year called "Holiday Hootenanny".

== Television ==
Several different television shows are named hootenanny and styled after it, including:

- Hootenanny, an early 1960s musical variety show broadcast on ABC in the United States. In 2007 a set of three DVDs called The Best of Hootenanny was issued, culled from the series. It contains clips of performances by The Chad Mitchell Trio, The Limeliters and The New Christy Minstrels, and Woody Allen as a stand-up comedian.
- In 1963 and 1964, a BBC show The Hoot'nanny Show, recorded in Edinburgh, was broadcast. Two albums with the same title were released, with contributions from Archie Fisher, Barney McKenna (before he joined The Dubliners), and The Corries.
- In the United Kingdom, Jools' Annual Hootenanny, a special New Year's Eve edition of Later... with Jools Holland featuring a wide selection of musicians, has been broadcast every year since 1993.

== Other uses ==
- Framus Hootenanny, a 1960s-era twelve-string guitar.

== See also ==
- Cèilidh
- Hoedown
- Hogmanay
