= Brent Harding =

American bassist (born 1967)

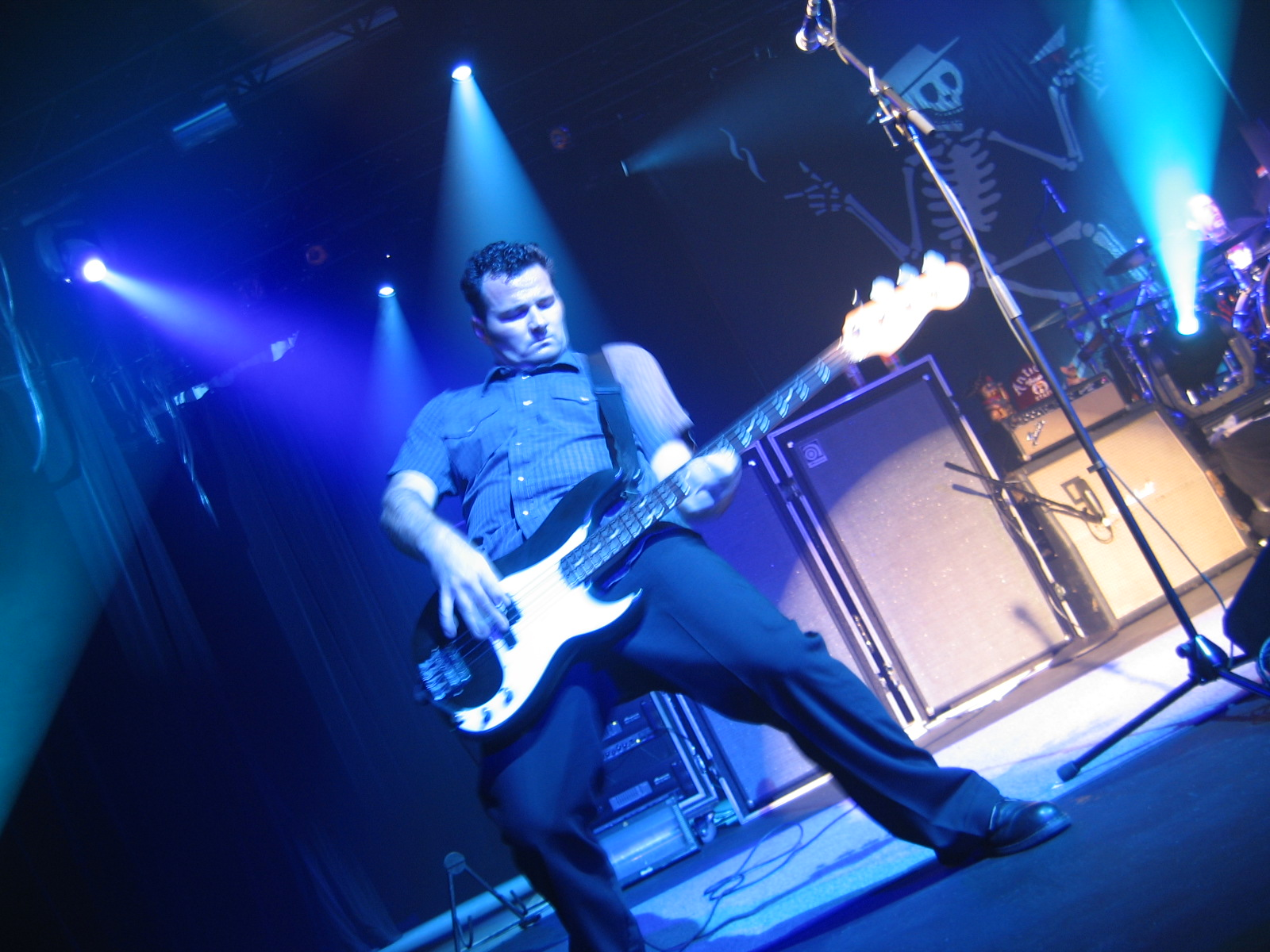
- Harding with Social Distortion in New York City at the Nokia Theater, October, 2005

Background information
- Born: Brent Douglas Harding; March 3, 1967 (age 59)
- Origin: Columbus, Ohio, U.S.
- Genres: Punk rock, Bluegrass, Alt. Country
- Occupation: Musician
- Instruments: Bass guitar, double bass, vocals
- Years active: 1986–present

Brent Harding (born March 3, 1967) is an American musician who is the current bass player for the California punk group Social Distortion, which he joined in early 2005.

== Biography ==
Harding joined Social Distortion in January 2005, replacing temporary bass player, Matt Freeman, who is best known for working as the bass player of Rancid. His first recording with the band was re-recordings of their older material and "Far Behind", which appear on their 2007 Greatest Hits album. He also appeared on the band's seventh studio album Hard Times and Nursery Rhymes, which was released in January 2011. This would be the band's first proper studio album with Harding.

Prior to joining Social Distortion, Harding was the bass player for Social Distortion frontman Mike Ness during his Cheating at Solitaire tour and recorded with Ness on his second solo offering Under the Influences. His previous bands include Deke Dickerson And The Ecco-Fonics, The Eugene Edwards Band, The Lucky Stars, The Sleepwalkers and The What-Me Worry? Jug Band. He also plays stand up bass for an insurgent bluegrass band called Whiskey Chimp in his home town of Ventura, CA. He appeared on Late Night with Conan O'Brien while playing bass with Mike Ness Band.

Summer of 2007 saw the birth of Harding's newest project, The Steeplejacks. Along with Harding, the band consists of Jonny Wickersham (Social Distortion, U.S. Bombs and Youth Brigade) on guitar, Sam Bolle (Fear, Dick Dale, Agent Orange) on stand up bass, Toby Emery (Raging Arb and the Redheads, Jackass) on mandolin and guitar and Bill Flores (The Rincon Ramblers, Louie Ortega) on pedal steel, fiddle and accordion. Harding plays guitar and drums with the Steeplejacks.

== Selected discography ==
=== Social Distortion ===
- Greatest Hits (2007)
- Hard Times and Nursery Rhymes (2011)
- Born to Kill (2026)

=== Mike Ness ===
- Under the Influences (1999)

=== Big Bad Voodoo Daddy ===
- Everything You Want For Christmas (2004)

=== Deke Dickerson and the Eccofonics ===
- Rhythm, Rhyme & Truth (2000)
- My Name is Deke (2004)
- More Million Sellers (1999)
- Mister Entertainment (2003)
- "Number One Hit Record" (1998)

=== Rod McKuen ===
- Beatsville (2002)

=== Amy Ferris ===
- Anything (2004)

=== Whiskey Chimp ===
- Naranja (2004)
- Ventura (2006)
