= Mute (short story) =

- Short story by Stephen King
- Country: United States
- Language: English
- Genre: Crime short story

Publication
- Published in: Playboy (December 2007); Just After Sunset
- Publisher: PLBY Group
- Media type: Print
- Publication date: 2007 (first publication)

Chronology
Ayana	A Very Tight Place

"Mute" is a crime short story by author Stephen King, first published in the December 2007 issue of Playboy magazine and subsequently collected in his work Just After Sunset in 2008.

== Plot summary ==
Monette, a middle-aged traveling book salesman (his first name is never given), goes to confession. When the priest asks him what sin he has committed, Monette admits that he believes he has sinned in some way but is not entirely sure exactly what he is guilty of. He then explains the events of the preceding days.

While on the road, Monette picked up a hitchhiker carrying a sign proclaiming him to be both deaf and mute. Once in the car, the hitchhiker seemingly fell asleep. Since Monette believed the man could not hear him, he decided to vent his problems to him.

Some time before the story, Monette discovered that his wife had been carrying on an affair for two years with a teacher in the school district she worked for. Despite the adulterers' ages (he was 60, she was 54), their activities included binge drinking, fetishism, and compulsive gambling. She was employed by the district in an administrative role and had access to large amounts of money, which she soon began embezzling from her employer in order to buy erotic underwear and sex toys. As her debt grew, she and her lover hoped to pay the money back by winning the lottery, only to embezzle more than $100,000 (equivalent to $155,000 in 2025) without earning anything to replace it. She revealed this all to Monette and, to his disbelief, tried to blame him for it, claiming his lack of interest drove her to it.

Continuing to speak to the apparently sleeping hitchhiker, Monette expressed his anger at her irresponsibility and lack of concern about how this debt would ultimately affect their college-attending daughter (who was unaware of her mother's sordid antics).

Stopping at a rest stop, Monette went to the bathroom. When he returned, he found the hitchhiker gone, having taken nothing of value save for Monette's Saint Christopher medal. Monette thought nothing of this until two days later when the police called to inform him that his wife and her lover had been beaten to death in a motel room.

The priest, horrified and intrigued by the story, asks about the aftermath. Monette relates his belief that the hitchhiker was in fact not deaf and heard the whole story. Monette had mentioned the name of the motel where his wife and her lover were living, which would have made finding them a simple matter. The hitchhiker also presumably determined Monette's address from his car registration, since Monette later found his medallion lying on his desk with a note (presumably from the hitchhiker) thanking him for the ride. Monette (truthfully) denies having intentionally set the hitchhiker up to kill his wife but admits he is relieved about her death: he has an alibi, and his wife's life insurance will be sufficient to repay the money she embezzled.

The priest admonishes Monette for his relief and tells him to say 10 "Our Fathers" and "Hail Marys". Before leaving, Monette asks about the possibility of God having put the hitchhiker in his car. The priest's first impulse is to say yes, but he outwardly admonishes Monette for blasphemy and adds 10 "Our Fathers" to his atonement. He then asks Monette if he genuinely wants the killer to be caught. Monette insists that he does but is perhaps not entirely sure: on his way home, he adds a few extra "Our Fathers" and "Hail Marys".

== Adaptations ==
In 2011, British screenwriter Gemma Rigg bought the rights to adapt Mute into a short film directed by Jacqueline Wright and starring Patrick Ryecart, Hugh Ross and Michael Legge. Mute is the first Stephen King film to be shot entirely in Great Britain.

David Alexander Kloepping began filming an adaptation of the short story as part of Stephen King's "Dollar Baby" program in 2020. While COVID-19 resulted in delays, an official extension was approved on October 24, 2022, for an additional 12 months.

== See also ==
- Short fiction by Stephen King
