= Harvey's Dream =

- Short story by Stephen King
- Country: United States
- Language: English
- Genre: Horror

Publication
- Published in: The New Yorker, Just After Sunset
- Publication date: June 30, 2003 (first publication)

Chronology
The Gingerbread Girl	Rest Stop

"Harvey's Dream" is a short story written by Stephen King, originally published in The New Yorker in the June 30, 2003 issue and later included in King's short story collection Just After Sunset in 2008.

== Plot ==
Harvey and Janet, a middle-aged married couple in a dysfunctional relationship, discuss over breakfast how Harvey woke up screaming from a dream he had: one of their daughters was killed by a truck. Janet soon realizes how the details of the dream are unerringly accurate for that morning, especially in noticing how their neighbor's car has a dent in it, along with what looks like a blood stain and a dark patch of hair. The story ends when Harvey answers a phone call, as he did in his dream, presumably confirming Janet's mounting fears that the events of the dream are true.

== Critical reception ==
In The Independent, Matt Thorne reviews the book Just After Sunset, in which "Harvey's Dream" can be found. He calls "Harvey's Dream" one of the weaker stories in the collection (along with "Graduation Afternoon"), stating that "in both of these stories, which seem to have been written quickly, [King] seems less interested in creating compelling fiction than in transcribing his night terrors."

In The Washington Times, Christian Toto, also reviewing Just After Sunset, says that ""Harvey's Dream" runs fewer than 10 pages, but Mr. King needs only a few paragraphs to evoke a wholly relatable nightmare — being stuck in an emotionless marriage."

A review of Just After Sunset in the St. Petersburg Times calls "Harvey's Dream" "a quietly alarming little story", one in Scotland on Sunday calls it "unusually polished" and "quietly eloquent" and one in the Concord Monitor says the story is "a parent's worst nightmare, viewed in slow motion."

== See also ==
- Short fiction by Stephen King
