= Hootenanny (disambiguation) =

Hootenanny is a folk music party.

Hootenanny may also refer to:

== Film and television ==
- Hootenanny (TV series), a 1960s television program
- Hootenanny Hoot, a 1963 film

== Music ==
- Hootenanny (The Country Gentlemen album), 1963
- "Hootenanny", a 1963 song by The Glencoves
- Hootenanny (The Replacements album), 1983
- "Hootenanny", by HLAH from the 1995 album Double Your Strength, Improve Your Health, & Lengthen Your Life
- Hootenanny Singers, a Swedish folk group
- Hootenanny Trio, a Finnish folk group; see Helsinki Folk Festival

== Other uses ==
- Hootenanny (store), a US clothing store owned by Newbury Comics
- A Dutch baby pancake, a baked pancake variety
- An acoustic guitar manufactured by Framus

== See also ==
- Jools' Annual Hootenanny, British TV show
- Shootenanny!, a 2003 album by Eels
