= N. (novella) =

2008 short story by Stephen King

- Cover of audiobook CD
- Author: Stephen King
- Language: English
- Genre: Horror, short story
- Published in: Just After Sunset
- Publisher: Scribner
- Publication date: November 11, 2008
- Publication place: United States
- Media type: Paperback
- Pages: 123
- Preceded by: Graduation Afternoon
- Followed by: The Cat from Hell

N. is a novella written by Stephen King that appears in his collection Just After Sunset (2008).

== Plot summary ==
In the outer circle of a nested narrative, a woman named Sheila writes to her childhood friend Charlie about her brother, Johnny, a psychiatrist who recently committed suicide. Sheila suspects it was due to a patient Johnny referred to in his notes anonymously as the eponymous "N".

In the inner circle of the narrative, N. is diagnosed by Dr. John Bonsaint as suffering from obsessive-compulsive disorder and paranoid delusions related to "keeping balance". N. has become convinced that a circle of stones in Ackerman's Field (a field on the outskirts of the town of Motton, Maine) contains a potential doorway (best described as a place where the walls between realities are thin, or perhaps breaking down) to another reality, where a terrifying monster, repeatedly said to be a "helmet-headed" being named Cthun, is trying to break through. A warning sign of the monster's imminent penetration is when a person viewing the field sees seven stones, when there are in fact eight. N's belief, shared by those who came before him, is that verifying the presence of eight stones when he is in the field, and his obsession with order when he is absent, somehow strengthens the barrier between our world and the one Cthun dwells in. However, the process is a perpetual and exhausting struggle. N.'s obsession eventually leads to his death by suicide, despite Johnny's best efforts.

Following a mysterious compulsion, John goes out to the field to see the stones for himself. He begins to suspect that N. might not have been delusional after all when he suffers from the same symptoms as his patient. Most notable are his obsession with numbers: odd numbers are bad, especially prime ones, even ones are safe, especially if they have a lot of factors, and if the sum of their digits is also even. The effect recedes as winter sets in, since the level of danger seems to be synchronized with the solstices (winter is safest, summer is most dangerous). However, as June approaches, John is driven to madness, and finally kills himself.

A newspaper clipping reveals Sheila's fate: after she read her brother's manuscript, she jumped from a bridge near Ackerman's Field and killed herself, in a manner identical to her brother. A copy of an e-mail indicates that Charlie intends to visit the field in Maine.

== Influences ==
King in interviews and in the book itself said the story was inspired by Arthur Machen's The Great God Pan stating: "Not Lovecraft; it's a riff on Arthur Machen's 'The Great God Pan,' which is one of the best horror stories ever written. Maybe the best in the English language. Mine isn't anywhere near that good, but I loved the chance to put neurotic behavior—obsessive/compulsive disorder—together with the idea of a monster-filled macroverse."

== Adaptations ==
The story, even before its first publication, had been adapted as Stephen King's N., a multi-part graphic video series, as part of the marketing campaign for King's upcoming collection. The series consists of 25 one and a half-minute episodes totaling approximately 30 minutes in length. Featuring sophisticated production values, the episodes were drawn by artist Alex Maleev, whose work has appeared on NBC's Heroes, and colored by comic-book colorist José Villarrubia, best known for his collaborations with Alan Moore, with animation and production by motion graphics studio Motherland, Inc. They were adapted by Marc Guggenheim, co-creator of the ABC TV series Eli Stone with creative oversight from Stephen King. The episodes are presented in a cutout animation format, complete with comic book–style graphics, an original score, sound effects, and a full cast of voiceovers that includes actor Ben Shenkman. The series is available on DVD as part of the special collector's edition of Just After Sunset.

The first episode went online on July 28, 2008 (although viewers who signed up for updates online were given a sneak peek at the first episode the day before). Conceived in a partnership with Scribner, Simon and Schuster Digital, Marvel Entertainment, and CBS Mobile, it is a completely new concept for an online comic series as it is available on mobile phone networks in addition to the iTunes Store and the series official website. According to Simon and Schuster, the series has been viewed over 1 million times via mobile phones and on the Internet.

In March 2010, Marvel published the first issue of a comic book adaptation of N., a four-issues limited series. While adapted from the novella and using much the same artwork of the graphic video series, the comic also contains additional scenes and information providing a fuller story, such as, the fate of the Ackermans, revealing N.'s full name and who spoke it to him in the field, who was responsible for giving N. the key and further expanding on Charlie's fate.

In September 2017, Gaumont Television announced it was developing a television series adapting the story, to be entitled '8'.

== See also ==
- Short fiction by Stephen King
