= James Pickering (disambiguation) =

James Pickering (died c. 1398) was speaker of the House of Commons of England.

James Pickering may also refer to:

- James Pickering (rugby league) (born 1966), Fijian rugby league player
- James Pickering, actor in Every Good Boy Deserves Favour
- Jim Pickering, fictional character
