= Long Black Veil =

1959 single by Lefty Frizzell

Single by Lefty Frizzell
- B-side: "When It Rains the Blues"
- Released: April 20, 1959 (US)
- Recorded: March 3, 1959
- Genre: Country
- Length: 3:05
- Label: Columbia 4-41384
- Songwriters: Marijohn Wilkin, Danny Dill
- Producer: Don Law

Lefty Frizzell singles chronology
"Cigarettes and Coffee Blues" (1958)	"Long Black Veil" (1959)	"Forbidden Lovers" (1963)

"Long Black Veil" is a 1959 country ballad, written by Danny Dill and Marijohn Wilkin and originally recorded by Lefty Frizzell.

It is told from the point of view of a man falsely accused of murder and executed. He refuses to provide an alibi, since on the night of the murder he was having an extramarital affair with his best friend's wife, and would rather die and take their secret to his grave than admit the truth. The chorus describes the woman's mourning visits to his gravesite while wearing a long black veil.

In 2019, Frizzell's version of "Long Black Veil" was selected by the Library of Congress for preservation in the National Recording Registry for being "culturally, historically, or aesthetically significant".

== Background ==
The writers later stated that they drew on three sources for their inspiration: Red Foley's recording of "God Walks these Hills with Me", a contemporary newspaper report about the unsolved murder of a priest, and the legend of a mysterious veiled woman who regularly visited Rudolph Valentino's grave. Dill himself called it an "instant folksong".

Wilkin played piano on the original recording by Frizzell. The song was a departure from Frizzell's previous honky tonk style and was a deliberate move toward the then-current popularity of folk-styled material and the burgeoning Nashville sound.

== Success ==
Recorded in Nashville in 1959 by Lefty Frizzell and produced by Don Law, the single reached #6 on Billboard Hot C&W Sides chart. In the process, the song became Frizzell's best-performing single in five years.

=== Cover versions ===
"Long Black Veil" has become a standard and has been covered by a variety of artists in country, folk and rock styles. The highest charting cover version was a #26 country hit by Sammi Smith in 1974.

Johnny Cash performed the song on the first episode of The Johnny Cash Show in 1969, duetting with Joni Mitchell. The song has also appeared on landmark albums by Johnny Cash and The Band in 1968 (see list below), and charted again in 1999 with the Dave Matthews Band, who performed the song live with Emmylou Harris at a Johnny Cash tribute concert. Early in her career, Joan Baez incorporated the song into her live repertoire, and recorded it twice (see list below).

The Band performed the song at the 1969 Woodstock Festival, and it appears on their first studio album, Music From Big Pink.

Bob Dylan performed a version of the song in 1970, as an outtake to the Self Portrait/New Morning sessions. This version was finally officially released on the Bob Dylan 1970 compilation in 2020, 50 years after the recording. Dylan also played the song in a live performance in 1997.

The song appears on David Allan Coe's 1984 compilation 20 Greatest Hits and on Marianne Faithfull's Rich Kid Blues, recorded in 1971 but shelved until 1985.

Nick Cave and the Bad Seeds recorded a version for the 1986 covers album Kicking Against the Pricks.

Bruce Springsteen performed the song on his 2006 Seeger Sessions Band Tour.

The chorus is frequently sung by Bruce Hornsby during live performances of his song "White Wheeled Limousine", including the version on the retrospective box set Intersections (1985-2005).

In 1992 the British band Diesel Park West covered the song (along with other cover versions) on their series of ‘God Only Knows’ EPs that were released on the EMI/Food record label.

Mick Jagger recorded a version with The Chieftains for that group's 1995 album The Long Black Veil.

Mike Ness, principal songwriter and guitarist of punk rock band Social Distortion, covered the song on his 1999 debut solo album Cheating at Solitaire.

Jerry Garcia, David Grisman and Tony Rice covered the song on the 2000 Pizza Tapes recordings.

It has been covered by Harry Manx, including a version on the compilation Johnny's Blues: A Tribute to Johnny Cash, and in October 2009, by Rosanne Cash on her album The List. A version by Scottish rock band Nazareth was never released on an album, but is played at live concerts.

On the 2011 album Rancho Alto by Jason Boland & the Stragglers, the song "False Accuser's Lament" is a follow-up to "Long Black Veil", describing a witness's view of the events and the role that he played.

Phil Lesh of the Grateful Dead performed the song several times, with a variety of musicians, in his rotating lineups of Phil Lesh and Friends at his venue Terrapin Crossroads. Jamey Johnson has covered the song on tour. Black Rebel Motorcycle Club occasionally perform the song during their live shows. The Black Crowes have covered the song, for instance during their December 17, 2010, performance at The Fillmore in San Francisco.

Richard Hawley covered the song as a B-side to "Just Like the Rain".

The Proclaimers' version is included as a bonus track on the 2001 release of their 1988 album Sunshine on Leith.

MJ Lenderman's live album And the Wind (Live and Loose!) closes with his rendition of the song, which he performed with the experimental folk band Styrofoam Winos during an afterparty for Pitchfork Music Festival held at the Lincoln Hall in Chicago.

=== Hit singles ===
- 1959 Lefty Frizzell, US Country single #6
- 1974 Sammi Smith, US Country single #26

=== Tracks on hit albums ===
- 1962 The Kingston Trio, New Frontier - US Pop album #16
- 1962 Burl Ives, The Versatile Burl Ives! - US Pop album #35
- 1963 Joan Baez, Joan Baez in Concert, Part 2 - US Pop album #7, UK album #15
- 1965 Johnny Cash, Orange Blossom Special - US Pop album #49
- 1968 Johnny Cash, Johnny Cash at Folsom Prison - US Pop album #13, US Country album #1, UK album #8
- 1968 The Band, Music from Big Pink - US Pop album #30
- 1970 Joan Baez, One Day at a Time - US Pop album #80
- 1972 New Riders of the Purple Sage, Gypsy Cowboy - US Pop album #85
- 1983 John Anderson, Wild & Blue - US Pop album #58, US Country Albums #3
- 1995 The Chieftains with Mick Jagger (vocal), The Long Black Veil - US Pop album #22, UK album #17
- 1999 Mike Ness, Cheating at Solitaire - US Pop album #80
- 1999 Dave Matthews Band, Listener Supported - US Pop album #15
- 2015 Robert Earl Keen, Jr., Happy Prisoner: The Bluegrass Sessions - US Pop album #109, US Top Bluegrass Albums 1, US Country Albums #10, US Top Top Independent Albums #6

=== Other versions ===
- 1960 Carl Mann, included on the 1997 compilation Rockin' Mann
- 1960 The Country Gentlemen, Country Songs, Old and New
- 1961 Burl Ives, The Versatile Burl Ives
- 1962 Johnny Rivers
- 1963 The Country Gentlemen, On The Road (live album)
- 1964 Jerry & Sara, Live at The Tangent, Palo Alto, CA, Jerry Garcia and his first wife Sara
- 1964 Johnny Williams and The Jokers
- 1968 The Move, The BBC Sessions
- 1968 The Wolfe Tones, The Rights of Man
- 1969 The Byrds, Live in Boston 1969, unofficial release
- 1969 The Small Faces, bootleg album, recorded live in Vienna, Austria, on 12 January 1969.
- 1970 Bill Monroe and his Blue Grass Boys, Kentucky Bluegrass
- 1971 Hank Williams, Jr., Sweet Dreams
- 1971 Marianne Faithfull, Rich Kid Blues, released in 1985
- 1980 Jimmy "Orion" Ellis, Country
- 1983 Zelenáči (Greenhorns) as "Dlouhý černý závoj" (lyrics by cs:Jan Vyčítal) on "Pod Liščí skálou"
- 1985 Baby Opaque, featuring Ian Mackaye, Fugue In Cow Minor
- 1986 Nick Cave and the Bad Seeds, Kicking Against the Pricks
- 1988 The Proclaimers, King of the Road EP
- 1992 Michael Nesmith, Live At The Lone Star Roadhouse, bootleg recording
- 1993 Jerry Garcia, David Grisman, Tony Rice, The Pizza Tapes - released in 1999
- 1995 Don Walser, The Archive Series Volume 2
- 1995 Don Williams, Borrowed Tales
- 1997 Sally Timms, Cowboy Sally
- 2002 Daryle Singletary, That's Why I Sing This Way
- 2002 Jason & the Scorchers, Wildfires + Misfires
- 2002 Bastard Sons of Johnny Cash, Distance Between
- 2002 Dave Matthews Band, The Gorge (6-Disc Special Edition).
- 2003 Johnny Cash, opening track on Unearthed box set released just after his death
- 2003 Deadstring Brothers, Deadstring Brothers
- 2003 Jon Langford and The Pine Valley Cosmanauts, The Executioner's Last Songs: Volume 3
- 2003 Rob Coffinshaker, "Fairytales from the Dungeon" single
- 2003 Harry Manx, Johnny's Blues: A Tribute To Johnny Cash (compilation tribute album)
- 2004 Dave Gunning and Charlie A'Court from Gunning's CD Two-Bit World
- 2005 Tim O'Brien, Fiddler's Green
- 2005 Bruce Hornsby, Intersections (1985-2005) (cameoed in the middle of "White-Wheeled Limousine")
- 2005 Charming Hostess, Punch
- 2006 Crooked Fingers, Like a Version 2, an Australian covers album
- 2006 Richard Hawley, B-side of "Just Like The Rain"
- 2007 Stoney LaRue, Live at Billy Bob's Texas
- 2007 David Gray,"A Thousand Miles Behind" live USA
- 2007 Chip Taylor & Carrie Rodriguez Live From The Ruhr Triennale
- 2007 Professor Louis and the Crowmatix (The Spirit of Woodstock)
- 2007 Matt Andersen, 'Live at Liberty House'
- 2008 Diamanda Galás, Guilty Guilty Guilty
- 2009 Aunt Martha, Candymaker Tour NYC
- 2009 Razzy Bailey, Damned Good Time, (with Johnny Cash)
- 2009 Rosanne Cash (Feat. Jeff Tweedy)
- 2009 Caroline Herring, Golden Apples of the Sun
- 2012 Gregg Allman & The All Star Band, Love for Levon
- 2012 Iron & Wine
- 2014 Sarah Jackson (A cappella version)
- 2014 Carter Hulsey, Drive Out
- 2014 We Banjo 3, Gather The Good
- 2016 Dale Watson, Under the Influence
- 2017 Jenny Owen Youngs, Long Black Veil - Single
- 2017 Lee Ann Womack, The Lonely, the Lonesome & the Gone
- The Stanley Brothers
- Bobby Bare
- Chris Ledoux
- Banks & Shane
- Bob Dylan one 1997 performance available on various bootlegs
- Nazareth
