= Born to Kill (Social Distortion song) =

Single by Social Distortion

from the album Born to Kill
- Released: February 25, 2026
- Genre: Punk rock; heartland rock
- Length: 3:50
- Label: Epitaph
- Songwriter: Mike Ness
- Producers: D. Sardy; Mike Ness

Social Distortion singles chronology
| "Up Around the Bend" (2013) | "Born to Kill" (2026) | "Partners in Crime" (2026) |

Music video
- "Born to Kill" on YouTube

"Born to Kill" is a song by American punk rock band Social Distortion. It is the title track and first single released from the band's eighth studio album of the same name (2026), on February 25, 2026.

The song was their first single since "Machine Gun Blues" to chart.

== Release and promotion ==
Versions of the song have been played as far back as 2018. The song itself was the self-titled and lead-off single for the band's eighth studio album.

=== Music video ===
The music video for "Born to Kill" came out on February 25, 2026. The video was produced and directed by Lance Bangs.

== Critical reception ==
Writing for Melodic Magazine, Ava Reynolds described the track as "quintessential Social Distortion in the best possible way". Reynolds said the track "exudes the unmistakable mix of punk grit and heartland rock swagger, the kind that reminds you of your skatepark days, but the song carries more reflective contemplation than rebellion now". Adam Grundy, writing for chorus.fm called the track a "blazing, speedy punk rock" song, with particular praise of the bridge. Grundy said "it’s on the bridge of the song that Ness declares, “I’m the underdog who ends up on top / The rebel poet with the peacock strut / Gonna make a change, gonna re-arrange / Look out, man, you’re in my pissing range,” before switching gears into another rousing chorus. Ness sounds as great as he’s ever been, and the confidence comes through in the performance."

== Charts ==
Chart performance for "Born to Kill"
| Chart (2026) | Peak position |
|---|---|
| US Alternative Airplay (Billboard) | 28 |
| US Mainstream Rock (Billboard) | 17 |
