= Live at the Hootenanny, Vol. 1 =

Live album by Various Artists
- Released: June 20, 2000
- Recorded: July 3, 1999
- Genre: Rockabilly
- Label: Time Bomb Recordings
- Producer: Bill Hardie

Live at the Hootenanny, Vol. 1 is a live compilation recorded at the Hootenanny Festival at the Oak Canyon Ranch, California in 1999 over the Fourth of July weekend. The concert features rockabilly bands like the Reverend Horton Heat, The Derailers, Mike Ness, and the Royal Crown Revue.

== Track listing ==
1. "Five-O Ford" (Reverend Horton Heat) – 3:21
2. "Just One More Time" (The Derailers) – 2:47
3. "I'm in Love With My Car" (Mike Ness) – 4:06
4. "Walkin' Like Brando" (Royal Crown Revue) – 3:27
5. "Mule Skinner Blues" (Dickers, Deke & The Ecco-Fonics) – 2:14
6. "Everybody" (Cadillac Tramps) – 4:24
7. "Out in California" (Alvin, Dave & The Guilty Men) – 5:39
8. "Rumblin' Bass" (Lee Rocker) – 4:20
9. "Halos and Horns" (Amazing Crowns) – 2:47
10. "You Sure Never Loved Me" (Hot Rod Lincoln) – 2:17
11. "Talkin' Woman" (Buddy Blue) – 3:25
12. "Don't You Wait For Me" (Russell Bass Scott) – 2:59
13. "Slowdown" (The Paladins) – 3:36
