= ABC Signature =

Former American television production company

- Final logo used from 2020 to 2024
- Formerly: Walt Disney Productions (1948–1983); Walt Disney Network Television (1983–2003); Touchstone Television (first incarnation, 1985–2007); ABC Studios (2007–2020); ABC Signature Studios (2013–2020)
- Type: In-name-only unit of 20th Television
- Industry: Television production Home video
- Founded: May 3, 1948; 78 years ago
- Defunct: October 1, 2024; 2 years ago
- Fate: Folded into 20th Television
- Successor: 20th Television
- Headquarters: Burbank, California, U.S.
- Area served: Worldwide
- Key people: Tracy Underwood (president); Josh Sussman (EVP, Business Affairs)
- Parent: Disney Television Studios

ABC Signature was a production arm of the American Broadcasting Company (ABC), which is a subsidiary of Disney Television Studios, a sub-division of the Disney Entertainment business segment of the Walt Disney Company. The studio's banner was also reserved for home video released of its shows beginning in 2008.

Established in 1948 as the television unit of the company, it was officially incorporated as Walt Disney Network Television in 1983 and was merged with a separate studio known as the first incarnation of Touchstone Television, which was established in 1985. Disney rebranded the studio as ABC Studios in 2007 in an in-house push to drop secondary brands. It was then renamed to ABC Signature on August 10, 2020, after it merged with another separate studio, ABC Signature Studios. It was dissolved on October 1, 2024 and folded into 20th Television, which had been acquired by Disney in 2019 and renamed from 20th Century Fox Television in 2020.

== Background ==
=== Walt Disney Productions (television unit) ===
In the 1930s, Walt Disney had no interest in television, but that changed by 1950 when he did an hour-long special on NBC, followed up a year after by a special on CBS. Both of these programs received excellent ratings. Disney eventually got into full series production when Disneyland debuted on ABC in 1954.

Following the success of Disneyland, in 1957, Disney was producing another primetime series for ABC, the western show Zorro. It did not last long in the ratings and was cancelled in 1959.

In 1961, Disney severed its terms with ABC and moved its weekly program to NBC, where it stayed for nearly 20 years until 1981. For years, Disney's lone television show on primetime was the eponymous anthology series.

After NBC axed the program, in 1981, it struck an agreement with CBS to take the anthology program there. In 1982, Disney produced the first prime-time show since the cancellation of Zorro in 1959, Herbie the Love Bug. It was cancelled after only one season. It was followed by three more programs as part of an agreement with CBS, Gun Shy, Small & Frye and Zorro and Son. These were sitcoms, and were cancelled after one season.

== History ==
=== Walt Disney Network Television/Touchstone Television ===
After the cancellation of the three prime-time series on CBS in 1983, Disney ventured back into primetime television. The Touchstone Films banner was used for television by then-new Disney CEO Michael Eisner in the 1984–1985 television season, with the short lived western Wildside. By 1985, Disney signed an agreement with sitcom producers Witt-Thomas-Harris Productions. In the next season, Disney's television production unit produced a hit in The Golden Girls using the Touchstone Films brand. The Touchstone name would be used for more mature shows, while the Disney name would be used for more family friendly series.

By the 1986–1987 television season, Disney was producing two shows for the fall season, Sidekicks, produced under the Walt Disney Network Television label; and The Ellen Burstyn Show, produced under the Touchstone Television label. Both were cancelled after the fall 1986 season, to be followed up by two more shows produced by Touchstone, the ABC show Harry, and the Fox show Down and Out in Beverly Hills. In 1987, Randy Reiss was named president of both television units. In the fall of 1987, Disney sold its third television drama, The Oldest Rookie, to CBS. In late 1988, after Witt/Thomas/Harris pulled out of the TeleVentures production unit (they were co-founders along with Tri-Star Pictures and Stephen J. Cannell Productions), Disney began selling, marketing and distributing Witt/Thomas programs exclusively. It was renewed two years later in 1990; the duo left to sign with rival Warner Bros. Television in 1992.

On April 18, 1989, Walt Disney Network Television and Touchstone Television were grouped together under Garth Ancier, the then-president of network television for Walt Disney Studios. The following week, Disney struck development deals with upstart Wind Dancer Productions (headed by Roseanne alumnus Matt Williams), and KTMB Productions (backed by The Golden Girls writers Kathy Speer, Terry Grossman, Barry Fanaro and Mort Nathan). The first projects were Wind Dancer's Carol & Company and KTMB's The Fanelli Boys, both of which aired on NBC. That same year, Disney signed a long-term contract with producer Michael Jacobs and his production company. Among the first projects under the collaboration was Singer & Sons, for NBC in 1990. The company also had a contract with producer Terry Louise Fisher, after she quit L.A. Law due to disputes with co-creator Steven Bochco and studio 20th Television, then-known as 20th Century Fox Television. Later that year, Disney signed a deal with Neal Marlens and Carol Black, creators of The Wonder Years, to produce three series for ABC.

With difficulties of selling in the off-network syndicated market, Disney television executives decided in late September 1990 that Hull High, then on NBC, or a potential NBC mid-season replacement in Disney Action-Adventure Hour, would be its last hour-long drama. High's pilot cost the company $4.5 million. The company also had another drama in collaboration with Stephen J. Cannell, The 100 Lives of Black Jack Savage, which was produced under the Walt Disney Network Television label. In 1991, Disney collaborated with Michael Jacobs and Jim Henson Productions on a primetime sitcom with puppets by Jim Henson's Creature Shop, Dinosaurs, which debuted on ABC. In 1992, the Touchstone Television label moved into producing longer forms for television, focusing on more adult-oriented fare with its first telefilm for CBS about Edna Buchanan, a Miami Herald crime reporter who won a Pulitzer Prize. The company would eventually sign a deal with ABC to develop 5 television movies for the 1993–94 and 1994–95 television seasons.

In 1992, KTMB Productions left Disney for Paramount. Eventually the team split into two separate production companies, one led by Speer and Grossman, the other led by Fanaro and Nathan. Within that same year, Wind Dancer Productions had received an exclusive deal with the ABC television network, with Disney serving as distributor of their series. And also that year, Michael Jacobs had renewed his deal with the studio. Also in May of that year, the company signed a deal with Grant/Tribune Productions, a joint venture between ex-CBS broadcaster Bud Grant and Tribune Broadcasting (who was subsequently renamed to Bud Grant Productions after Tribune pulled out) to distribute their programming, with Cutters the only one that came out of the deal. In 1993, Disney had reached a deal with comedian Sinbad and his David & Golitah Productions company for a film and television deal.

On August 24, 1994, with Jeffrey Katzenberg's resignation, Richard Frank became head of Walt Disney Television and Telecommunications, a new group taking in Touchstone Television and other television units of the Disney studios. In 1995, they returned to producing dramas with Nowhere Man. That same year, Wind Dancer was signed to a new deal with Disney, following the expiration of their contract with ABC.

In April 1996, with the ongoing post-Disney-CC/ABC merger and the retirement of its president, Walt Disney Television and Telecommunications' divisions were reassigned to other groups, with Walt Disney Television and Touchstone Television transferred to the Walt Disney Studios. In 1997, Disney struck a deal with Imagine Entertainment to launch a television venture. On November 1, 1997, David Neuman assumed the presidency of Touchstone Television while retaining his post as president of Walt Disney Network Television. In March 1998, Touchstone Television was placed under Buena Vista Television Productions, a newly formed group under chairman Lloyd Braun, along with Walt Disney Network Television. In June 1998, former ABC chief Greer Shephard and NYPD Blue director Michael M. Robin launched a production company with an exclusive agreement at the studio. In May 1999, J.J. Abrams, who created Felicity at that time, signed a film and television deal with the studio. By June 1999, Neuman left for the Digital Entertainment Network. In 1999, after Disney's Smart Guy was cancelled, all Disney shows for primetime would be produced under the Touchstone Television label.

=== Touchstone Television (ABC subsidiary) ===
In late 1999, Walt Disney Television Studios (also called Buena Vista Television Group or Buena Vista Television Productions), were transferred from the Disney Studios to the ABC Television Network to merge with ABC's primetime division, ABC Entertainment, forming the ABC Entertainment Television Group. By then, the Walt Disney Television label was dropped and all primetime programming produced by Disney would use the "Touchstone Television" name. Shortly afterwards, writer Seth Kurland struck a deal with the studio to produce shows. Following Kurland's deal, writer Don Reo, formerly of Lenny and Blossom when Witt-Thomas was producing for Disney also struck a deal with the studio. Around the same time, Touchstone Television sold the series, Daddio to NBC. The program lasted only nine episodes before NBC cancelled it.

In 2000, Touchstone Television created two departments for comedy in September, and a department for drama in December. Touchstone Television had infamously left the production of the CBS series CSI: Crime Scene Investigation in 2000, fearing it was a flop and sold Disney's interest in the series to Alliance Atlantis. By 2001, Steve McPherson signed on as president of the television unit. While two of their pilots were in consideration to be picked up by ABC in April 2003, Tollin/Robbins Productions signed a two-year development deal with Touchstone Television, which included a two-year option, shares in profits and outside sales.

In 2004, Alias creator J.J. Abrams and his Bad Robot production company had struck a development deal with Touchstone Television to produce television series, eventually going further into production of Lost. Also that year, Marc Cherry signed a development deal at the studio. The following year, the Russo brothers has struck a two-year deal with the studio, with veteran writer and producer Steven Bochco, who had produced several shows for ABC, signing a deal with the studio that same year to produce future shows. In 2006, Marti Noxon struck a deal with the studio to produce shows.

=== ABC Studios ===
ABC Studios logo

In February 2007, Disney announced that Touchstone Television would be renamed ABC Television Studio as part of Disney's push to drop secondary brands like Buena Vista in favor of the Disney, ABC and ESPN brands. By the time the name change was implemented that fall, the new name had been modified to ABC Studios.

On August 4, 2008, Lionsgate completed a deal with Walt Disney Studios Home Entertainment, the distributor of ABC Studios/Touchstone Television shows on DVD, to acquire the distribution rights to several shows including According to Jim, Reaper, Hope & Faith, 8 Simple Rules and Boy Meets World. At the same time, new DVDs of ABC and ABC Family shows phased out the Buena Vista Home Entertainment logo at the beginning of the disc and replaced it with the ABC Studios and ABC Family logos, respectively.

In June 2009, ABC Entertainment announced a new organization, effective immediately as ABC Entertainment Group, while consolidating back office functions like business affairs, distribution and scheduling of ABC Studios and ABC Entertainment and retaining separate creative units. In January 2010, Disney-ABC Television Group announced it was cutting 5% of its workforce. In October 2012, ABC Studios formed its Signature unit to sell to outside networks.

In early 2016, ABC Studios International (also referred to as ABC International Studios) was set up with the appointment of Keli Lee as its managing director of international content and talent, combined with her move to London. The unit, announced at MIPCOM in October 2016, would allow more overseas local productions, leveraging fellow Disney Media Network expertises in distribution and production for the local and international co-productions, IP reinventions, and original format acquisitions and productions. This would add to Disney-ABC's international productions in Latin America, where the company has 16 years of producing local content. In April 2017, the international unit greenlit its first co-production, the Australian series Harrow. Lee signed a first look deal with Hoodlum Entertainment, the co-producers of Harrow, by February 2018. With ABC picking up the international unit's Reef Break in August 2018, ABC Studios started co-producing.

In August 2017, Ryan Seacrest Productions left CBS at the end of their deal to move over to ABC Studios. Following the expansion of its cable/streaming unit, ABC Studios launched a new alternative division for the full range of unscripted work, from documentaries to game shows to social experiment series. The former executive vice president of development and production at Ryan Seacrest Productions, along with Fernando Hernandez, the former head of Universal Television Alternative Studios, were hired by the studio to lead the division around January 2018. This division was announced in October 2018 with a small slate under production executive Gareth Provan, and an in-house development group called The Originals Group. The division is tapping existing production companies with deals at ABC Studios, including Ryan Seacrest Productions, Larry Wilmore's Wilmore Films and Bob Sertner Productions, in addition to partnerships that Hernandez has developed, including those with Mission Control Media, Parker Paige Media, INE Entertainment, and Party Pit Productions.

==== ABC Signature Studios ====
Former ABC Signature Studios logo, used from 2013 to 2020

ABC Studios was moving to sell to outside networks. As the studios have placed the former ABC comedy Cougar Town at TBS, and Devious Maids at Lifetime (originally ordered and developed at ABC), Signature was set up in October 2012 to continue the trend. In 2013, ABC Studios vice president of drama Tracy Underwood was appointed senior vice president of ABC Signature. Signature was incorporated on September 23, 2013.

Signature developed Mistresses, which was included in ABC's summer schedule and renewed for another season. In October 2013, the division placed its first outside project, Benched, for USA, with a pilot order that finished shooting by December. Other projects were in the works with A&E, WE tv and TBS. In the works with ABC, Signature has a possible straight-to-series Stephen King story adaptation called Grand Central, based on The New York Times at Special Bargain Rates. Corporate sibling Freeform picked up Rated P For Parenthood for development as its first program from Signature in June 2014.

In April 2015, Signature and ABC Studios signed a two-year first-look with Black Label Media, started by Molly Smith, Trent Luckinbill and Thad Luckinbill three years prior as a finance and production company. McG's Wonderland Sound & Vision signed a two-year overall production agreement with Signature, Freeform and ABC Studios in October 2015. This follows two productions from McG on Freeform/ABC Family. Signature signed SMILF creator, executive producer and star Frankie Shaw to a two-year overall deal in July 2018. In March 2019, the deal was suspended following an investigation into allegations of misconduct against Shaw on the set of SMILF.

In April 2016, Freeform greenlit Cloak & Dagger with a straight-to-series order, as Marvel Television's first co-production with Signature. Another co-production with Marvel Television was greenlit in August 2016, with Runaways confirmed for the Hulu streaming service. Signature also put a live-action Mighty Ducks series in development beginning in January 2018, which later ended up as a Disney+ original series called The Mighty Ducks: Game Changers.

Signature is teaming with John Grisham, Hulu and Michael Seitzman's Maniac Productions to create a Grisham Universe set of series. The franchise would begin with two series, The Rainmaker and Rogue Lawyer, based on Grisham's books, with a potential to grow to additional series. Hulu had dropped out of the Grisham Universe by September 5, 2019, with the pair being shopped given other interested outlets.

From its pilot, Signature's The Wilds, a young adult drama, was picked up in May 2019 by Amazon, its first from the company. Underwood was promoted in February 2020 to the new position of executive vice president, creative affairs of ABC Studios to oversee development at ABC Studio in addition to managing ABC Signature.

=== Under Disney Television Studios ===
After the acquisition of 21st Century Fox completed on March 20, 2019, ABC Studios and ABC Signature Studios both became part of Disney Television Studios. In July 2019, Disney TV Studios announced a reorganization in executive leadership. Fox TV executives Jonnie Davis and Josh Sussman have replaced Patrick Moran and Howard Davine as president and executive vice president of business affairs of ABC Studios respectively. It was also announced that Amy Hartwick, the studio's head of the comedy department, has exited. In September 2019, ABC Studios' alternative division head Hernandez exited the post, with ABC indicating that they would remain in the businesses.

ABC Studios International produced the anthology series Unsung Heroes which was in development while the company was launching ABC Discover to find more British talent. In December 2019, an exodus of the international unit's top executives including managing director Keli Lee occurred. However, no replacements have been named given a re-assessing of the unit is taking place.

On August 10, 2020, ABC Studios and ABC Signature were merged into one unit as part of a restructuring plan by Disney regarding their television production units; the merged company took on the latter's name. Meanwhile, Fox 21 Television Studios was renamed Touchstone Television, restoring that brand name after a thirteen-year dormancy (only to be folded into 20th Television on December 1 that year), and 20th Century Fox Television was renamed 20th Television (the former name of that entity's domestic syndication division, which was merged with Disney Platform Distribution).

On August 18, 2021, writers Jordan Reddout and Gus Hickey signed an overall deal with the studio. On October 29, 2021, writer-producer Lila Byock also signed an overall deal with the studio. Matt Lopez, creator/executive producer of Promised Land, also signed an overall deal with the studio the same year on November 17.

=== Shutdown ===
On October 1, 2024, Eric Schrier, president of Disney Television Studios & Business Operations, announced that ABC Signature would be dissolved effective immediately, with its operations folded into sister company 20th Television (formerly a syndication and distribution arm until it was absorbed into Disney Platform Distribution). As a result, senior vice president Erin Wehrenberg will leave the company, with president Tracy Underwood transitioning to an overall producing deal with Disney Television Studios; multiple employees were transferred to 20th Television; ABC Signature is an in-name-only unit of 20th Television from that date onwards.

== See also ==
- Disney Entertainment Television
- Disney Television Studios
- Touchstone Television
- 20th Television
- 20th Television Animation
- Searchlight Television
- FX Productions
