= Willa (short story) =

- Short story by Stephen King
- Country: United States
- Language: English
- Genre: Horror

Publication
- Published in: Playboy, Just After Sunset
- Publication type: Periodical
- Publisher: Playboy Enterprises
- Media type: Magazine
- Publication date: December 2006

Chronology
—	The Gingerbread Girl

"Willa" is a short story by American writer Stephen King, originally published in the December 2006 issue of Playboy magazine.

The story is also included as the first entry in King's 2008 short-fiction collection Just After Sunset. In the endnotes in the collection called "Sunset Notes", King writes of this story: "This probably isn't the best story in the book, but I love it very much, because it ushered in a new period of creativity for me – as regards the short story, at least. Most of the stories in Just After Sunset were written subsequent to 'Willa', and in fairly quick succession (over a period of not quite two years)."

== Plot summary ==
A man finds himself in a train station in Crowheart Springs, Wyoming, after an apparent derailment with a few of the other passengers. Unable to locate his fiancée, Willa, he decides to set out to a nearby town—where he knows she would go—to find her. The others try to convince him that not only is the train going to arrive any minute to pick them up, going to town is dangerous as the almost three-mile hike goes straight through deserted terrain that is inhabited by dangerous wolves. Ignoring their advice, he heads into town and has a close encounter with one of the wolves on the way.

Noticing some lights and music at a nearby honky-tonk, he decides to investigate and finds Willa sitting all alone in a corner booth. As he tries to convince her to come back to the station with him, he realizes what they both have known all along: that he and Willa (along with the rest of the passengers at the train station) are actually ghosts—dead from a train wreck that happened nearly twenty years before. When they return to the station, he sees a poster saying that the station will be demolished, a poster the other ghosts are unable to see because of their disbelief. He and Willa leave the station for good, pondering what will happen to the ghosts during demolition.

== Critical reception ==
Several critics, in reviewing Just After Sunset, also included their opinions of "Willa". In The Washington Times, the reviewer says, ""Willa" is more than just a flirty romance. It's a ghost story, albeit one with a kicker that causes goosebumps of a different order." Carole Goldberg, in the Sun Sentinel, calls the story a "wistful love song in a haunting minor key." A review for NPR says that in "Willa", as well as in another story in the collection, "The Things They Left Behind", King uses "the supernatural as a way to movingly depict life's frailty."

== Adaptations ==
In 2019, Willa was adapted into a short film and stars Kelsi Mayne, Adrian Jaworski, Madison Seguin and Nick Szeman, was produced by Barbara Szeman and directed by Corey Mayne.

A developmental concert of a folk musical by Nathan Skethway and Abi Vermeal premiered Off-Broadway at Ars Nova's 2019 ANT Fest. The show reimagines the tale as a campfire story told by a cast of singer/musicians. The June 2019 cast featured Melanie Gettler, Brian Chandler Cook, Alyssa Lundberg, James Canal, and Molly Williams, as well as Skethway and Vermeal. The musical remains in development.

== See also ==
- Stephen King short fiction bibliography
