= The Derailers =

American country music band

- Origin: Austin, Texas, United States
- Genres: Ameripolitan
- Years active: 1994–present
- Labels: Freedom, Watermelon, Sire, Lucky Dog, Palo Duro
- Members: Brian Hofeldt; Karen Biller; Sweet Basil McJagger; Bracken Hale
- Past members: Tony Villanueva; Mark Horn; Ed Adkins; Kevin Smith; Chris Schlotzhauer; Scott Matthews
- Website: http://www.derailers.com

The Derailers are an American country music band based in Austin, Texas. They were founded by Portland, Oregon, natives Tony Villanueva and Brian Hofeldt in 1994.

== History ==
The Derailers' first LP, Live Tracks, was issued in 1995. It was the first release of the Austin-based independent label Freedom Records. Shortly after the release, The Derailers became one of the most talked about acts at Austin's 1995 South by Southwest music festival, and the record became profitable within two months. This occurred at a time when “Americana” radio stations were starting to multiply and various forms of non-mainstream country music were coming together under such rubrics as Americana and alternative-country. The Derailers became a major part of that movement, representing the "traditional honky-tonk" end of the subgenre.

With its fan base growing, the band signed with the more established Austin independent label Watermelon Records for their second release, Jackpot (1996), and then moved to Sire Records for their third release, Reverb Deluxe (1997). Aggressive touring across the U.S. and airplay on Americana radio stations grew a steadily increasing fan base and The Derailers came to be seen as an act poised for breakout success in mainstream country, and were even hailed as “the future of country music” in the Austin press. They signed with Curb Records for their first major-label release, Full Western Dress, in 1999, which would reach No. 69 on the Billboard Country chart. A single from this album, "The Right Place", appeared on the Billboard single charts at No. 71 and the video became one of the 50 most requested of the year 2000 on Country Music Television.

Seeking greater mainstream success, The Derailers switched to Sony’s Lucky Dog Records for their next release, Here Come the Derailers, and were paired with Nashville A-list producer Kyle Lehning. This album had the unfortunate release date of September 11, 2001, and was largely overlooked by mainstream radio stations that began emphasizing patriotic songs. A profile of the band on National Public Radio’s Morning Edition in 2002 did help push the album just into the top 50 on the Billboard country charts. The follow-up release for Lucky Dog, Genuine (2003), did slightly better, cresting at No. 44. But soon after that, founding member and primary vocalist Tony Villanueva announced he was leaving the band to spend more time with his family and become a church pastor.

Since Villanueva’s departure, The Derailers have shuffled their lineup, with Brian Hofeldt taking on the role of primary front man. With these changes they have moved back to the independent world, releasing two albums on the Palo Duro label, Soldiers of Love (2007) and Under the Influence of Buck (2007), a tribute album to one of their heroes, Buck Owens

Buck Owens and the Buckaroos has been one of the primary influences on the Derailers' music from the beginning. Owens himself performed with the band on one track of Full Western Dress, "Play Me the Waltz of the Angels", and also selected the band to play at his 70th birthday party in 1999.

In addition to Buck Owens and the Buckaroos, The Derailers' music also reflects influences from 1960s pop-rock acts such as The Beatles, Roy Orbison and The Beach Boys. On their 2007 CD, Under The Influence Of Buck, they dedicated the CD to Buck Owens and Buckaroo front men Don Rich and Doyle Holly.

== Discography ==
=== Albums ===
Year	Title	US Country	Label
1995	Live Tracks		Freedom
1996	Jackpot		Watermelon
1997	Reverb Deluxe		Sire
1999	Full Western Dress	69	Sire
2001	Here Come the Derailers	50	Lucky Dog
2003	Genuine	44	Lucky Dog
2006	Soldiers of Love		Palo Duro
2006	Retrospective: Just One More Time		Varese
2007	Under the Influence of Buck		Palo Duro
2008	Guaranteed to Satisfy		Palo Duro

=== Singles ===
Year	Single	US Country	Album
1997	"Just One More Time"		Reverb Deluxe
1999	"The Right Place"	71	Full Western Dress
2001	"More of Your Love"		Here Come the Derailers
2002	"Bar Exam"		Here Come the Derailers
2003	"Genuine"		Genuine
2006	"I'm Still Missing You"		Texas Unplugged, Vol. 2
2007	"Hey Valerie"		Soldiers of Love
2007	"Who's Gonna Mow Your Grass"		Under the Influence of Buck
2007	"Big in Vegas"		Under the Influence of Buck

=== Music videos ===
Year	Video	Director
1998	"Just One More Time"	Jamie Stern
1998	"California Angel"	Jamie Stern
1999	"The Right Place"	Chris Rogers
2001	"More of Your Love"	Wes Edwards
2002	"Bar Exam"	Lawrence Carroll
2007	"Who's Gonna Mow Your Grass"	Travis Nicholson

== Other appearances ==
A band called "the Derailers" appears in the short story "Willa" by Stephen King. Tony Villanueva is mentioned by name. The two protagonists see them play at a roadside bar called "26". The short story was first published in the December 2006 issue of Playboy and can be found in the collection Just After Sunset, Scribner (2008).
