= Hard Times and Nursery Rhymes =

Studio album by Social Distortion
- Released: January 18, 2011
- Recorded: February–July 2010
- Studios: Ocean, Burbank, California
- Genres: Roots rock; cowpunk; punk rock
- Length: 46:55
- Label: Epitaph
- Producer: Mike Ness

Social Distortion chronology
Greatest Hits (2007)	Hard Times and Nursery Rhymes (2011)	Born to Kill (2026)

Singles from Hard Times and Nursery Rhymes
- 1. "Machine Gun Blues" Released: November 16, 2010

Hard Times and Nursery Rhymes is the seventh studio album by American punk rock band Social Distortion, released on January 18, 2011. It is the band's first album recorded with bassist Brent Harding, their first album of new material since 2004's Sex, Love and Rock 'n' Roll, and their first release on Epitaph Records. Work on the album began in 2006 and it was originally forecast for a 2007 release, but was pushed back several times while the band continued touring and writing new material. After four years of writing, Social Distortion recorded the album from February to July 2010 at Ocean Studios in Burbank, California. Drummer Atom Willard left the group during the recording sessions in favor of his other band, Angels & Airwaves. He was temporarily replaced by Scott Reeder before David Hidalgo, Jr. joined as the band's new permanent drummer. Despite being listed as a band member on the album, Hidalgo did not actually play on it; instead, the band hired session musician Josh Freese to record the drum tracks.

Although Social Distortion continued to be active in the years following its release, Hard Times and Nursery Rhymes was the band's last studio album for more than a decade; the band did not release another album, Born to Kill, until 2026.

== History ==
In August 2005, sources reported that Social Distortion was going to begin work on a seventh studio album to be released in 2006. However, frontman Mike Ness told Crush Music Magazine that a new Social Distortion album would "probably" not come out in 2006 or anytime soon. He explained, "I feel like we've got a great start on a new album, we'd like to do a new album soon but I doubt it will be that soon. I figure I will use my time off next year to do the writing and maybe start it toward the end of 2006 recording. It'll be soon but I don't know if it'll be quite that soon." Also in that interview, Ness promised the album not to take another eight years; it instead was released within seven years of their previous album.

In May 2006, it was reported that Social Distortion had started writing and rehearsing new material, with an intended release date of late 2006/early 2007. In July, Ness told The Desert Sun that the band would like to be in the studio in 2007 putting out their seventh album and revealed that "Bakersfield" was one of the new songs they were working on. Asked in that interview what things Ness was writing about, he replied, "the last record had a lot of songs about love and loss, maybe this record I want to be different... but I don't want to give it away... Every record you want better than the last one and a little different. I'm not sure of the direction yet honestly." After embarking on a series of tours in the summer and autumn of 2006, Social Distortion returned to the studio in December to continue working on new material.

Asked in April 2007 about Social Distortion's plans for the coming months, Ness replied, "I had a song that was pretty much the template for the new album, and we went in and recorded it. We're gonna release it sooner. We're gonna put it on the greatest-hits album. So if people want to get a taste of what the new album will sound like, they can hear it on that song. A song called 'Far Behind.' It's a song I wrote in the last year, and we went and recorded it and it came out awesome. We figure it's a great song for the greatest hits because it starts at the beginning of our career and ends right now." In July 2007, Ness told Billboard.com that Social Distortion had "a lot of songs" that never appeared on Sex, Love and Rock 'n' Roll, and was revisiting demos that he had recorded in 1994. Asked in December what the current status of the album was, Ness told The Denver Post that the band was still writing new material and doing a new song in a setlist but would have to stop performing live before recording could take place.

In April 2008, Ness told Spinner that Social Distortion was planning an acoustic album to be released in 2009, stating "I think it could be really, really neat. It's almost like a Bob Dylan/Bruce Springsteen/Johnny Cash kind of feel with a punk edge ... but acoustic. Sometimes [the songs] are more powerful stripped down than with full volume." Ness also revealed plans for his next solo album, but he was not sure if it was going to be released before or after the follow-up to Sex, Love and Rock 'n' Roll or the acoustic album. In July 2009, Ness revealed to Russian's Tarakany! Bad TV that Social Distortion was planning to enter the studio in December 2009 or the beginning of 2010 to begin recording their new album. In September that year, he confirmed that the album would be recorded in January 2010 at Studio 606, a studio owned by the Foo Fighters. Asked when the album was expected to be released, Ness stated that it would "probably be out" in the spring or summer of 2010. In October, guitarist Jonny "2 Bags" Wickersham told Boston Examiner that Social Distortion was expected to enter the studio on February 1 for a late spring release. Asked what musical direction the band would be taking on the album, he said that it would be "very rock and roll," and include a country song in the vein of the band's 1992 album Somewhere Between Heaven and Hell. Wickersham explained, "It's not like we're going to start putting out a record like we've been listening to The Dead or something. We've got a handful of songs right now that are finished, and bunch that we're still working on."

On February 7, 2010, Social Distortion announced on its Twitter account that it would start recording a new album on February 8. Also in February, Ness revealed to Spinner that the band had just tracked 12 songs, and was "going to probably track another five". He said the self-produced, still-untitled album, which he hopes to release before the end of the year, would feature the classic Social Distortion sound – a combination of punk, rockabilly and country, presumably. He explained, "It's funny – the record reminds me very much of Somewhere Between Heaven and Hell, but also I'm bringing elements of early New York '70s punk, influences that maybe haven't come out as prominently in my writing in the past. It's a little more Johnny Thunders. Some of the early first wave of punk was very blues-based rock 'n' roll, but it had this urban snottiness to it." Ness also explained what happened to the acoustic album, which was announced back in 2008, "The acoustic thing is just a future project, which I think will be significant and equally important. But as far as the priority goes, it's more important now to get a studio record out that is a regular record". On May 20, 2010, Social Distortion updated their Twitter with this post saying, "the album is tracked... finishing up writing and getting ready to head back into the studio to record vocals." The album was said to be a return to their punk rock roots and would focus on the New York punk of the 70's and early 80's.

At a show in Poughkeepsie, New York on July 27, 2010, Ness revealed that the new Social Distortion album would be called Hard Times and Nursery Rhymes and also promised a November release date.

A September 2010 issue of Rolling Stone magazine claimed the album would be released on November 23, 2010. However, Ness later said that its release date had been pushed back to January 2011. In October 2010, Social Distortion announced that Hard Times and Nursery Rhymes would be released on January 18, 2011. They also mentioned that "Machine Gun Blues" would be the album's first single and available for download via iTunes on November 16.

== Reception ==
Professional ratings
Review scores
Source	Rating
Allmusic	3.5/5 stars
BLARE Magazine	4/5 stars
Pressure Magazine	5/6 stars
SPIN	8/10 stars
PopMatters	8/10 stars
Rock Sound	7/10 stars
Artistdirect	4/5 stars
Slant Magazine	2/5 stars
Rolling Stone	3/5 stars

Critical reviews of Hard Times and Nursery Rhymes were mostly positive. AllMusic's Mark Deming gave the album a rating of three-and-a-half stars out of five and states that it "is clearly the work of a band that still gives a damn about their rock & roll, no matter how familiar the surroundings. While 2004's Sex, Love and Rock 'N' Roll saw Ness digging deeper into personal concerns, Hard Times finds him stepping back a few paces; while 'Can't Take It with You,' 'Gimme the Sweet and Lowdown,' and 'Still Alive' find Ness waxing philosophical, most of these songs exist in the world of cool cars, tough dames, and bad-luck guys who've been part of his regular cast of characters since the album Prison Bound in 1988."

The album reached number 4 on the Billboard 200 albums chart, selling 46,366 copies in its first week, marking Social Distortion's first ever top-10 album and highest ever peak on that chart in their entire 33-year career.

== Track listing ==
All lyrics are written by Mike Ness, except "Alone and Forsaken" by Hank Williams; all music is composed by Ness, except where noted.

Hard Times and Nursery Rhymes track list
No.	Title	Length
1.	"Road Zombie" (Instrumental)	2:21
2.	"California (Hustle and Flow)"	5:00
3.	"Gimme the Sweet and Lowdown"	3:23
4.	"Diamond in the Rough"	4:35
5.	"Machine Gun Blues" (Ness, Jonny Wickersham)	3:33
6.	"Bakersfield"	6:25
7.	"Far Side of Nowhere" (Ness, Wickersham)	3:29
8.	"Alone and Forsaken" (Hank Williams)	4:02
9.	"Writing on the Wall"	5:01
10.	"Can't Take It With You"	5:02
11.	"Still Alive"	4:05
Total length:		46:55

Deluxe edition & vinyl bonus tracks
No.	Title	Length
12.	"Take Care of Yourself" (Ness, Wickersham)	3:59
13.	"I Won't Run No More"	3:40
14.	"Down Here (With the Rest of Us)" (iTunes only)	3:56
Total length:		57:32

== Personnel ==
Social Distortion

- Mike Ness – lead guitar, vocals
- Jonny Wickersham – rhythm guitar, backing vocals
- Brent Harding – bass
- Dave Hidalgo Jr. – drums (credited but does not perform)

Additional musicians

- Danny McGough – Hammond organ, piano
- Josh Freese – drums
- Danny Frankel – additional percussion
- Kandace Lindsey, Ijeoma Njaka – additional backing vocals on "California (Hustle And Flow)" and "Can't Take it with You"

Production

- Mike Ness – production
- Russell Lee – cover art

== Charts ==
Chart (2011)	Peak position
Austrian Albums (Ö3 Austria)	14
Belgian Albums (Ultratop Wallonia)	89
Canadian Albums (Billboard)	19
Dutch Albums (Album Top 100)	95
Finnish Albums (Suomen virallinen lista)	6
German Albums (Offizielle Top 100)	3
Japanese Albums (Oricon)	108
Swedish Albums (Sverigetopplistan)	11
Swiss Albums (Schweizer Hitparade)	20
UK Independent Albums (Official Charts)	11
UK Rock & Metal Albums (Official Charts)	15
US Billboard 200	4
US Independent Albums (Billboard)	1
US Top Rock Albums (Billboard)	3
US Indie Store Album Sales (Billboard)	2
