= Country Songs, Old and New =

Country Songs Old & New

Studio album by Country Gentlemen
- Released: 1960
- Recorded: 1960
- Genre: Bluegrass; progressive bluegrass
- Length: 44:05
- Label: Folkways, Smithsonian Folkways
- Producer: Country Gentlemen

Country Gentlemen chronology
Country Songs Old & New (1960)	Folk Songs & Bluegrass (1961)

Professional ratings
Review scores
Source	Rating
Allmusic	5/5 stars

Country Songs, Old and New is the debut studio album by progressive bluegrass band Country Gentlemen. It was recorded and released in 1960 and later reissued in 1991.

== Track listing ==
Side one
No.	Title	Writer(s)	Length
1.	"Roving Gambler"		3:07
2.	"The Little Sparrow"		3:31
3.	"Drifting Too Far"		3:27
4.	"Weeping Willow"	A.P. Carter	2:01
5.	"Tomorrow's My Wedding Day"		2:09
6.	"The Story Of Charlie Lawson"		3:03
7.	"Turkey Knob"	Eddie Adcock	2:18
8.	"Paul And Silas"		2:26
Total length:			22:04

Side two
No.	Title	Writer(s)	Length
1.	"Ellen Smith"		2:13
2.	"The Long Black Veil"	Danny Dill, Marijohn Wilkin	3:35
3.	"Honky Tonk Rag"	John Duffey	2:26
4.	"Jesse James"		2:35
5.	"Have Thine Own Way"		2:51
6.	"A Good Woman's Love"	Cy Coben	3:25
7.	"The Double Eagle"	Josef Wagner	2:54
8.	"Darling Alalee"		2:04
Total length:			22:01

== Personnel ==
- Charlie Waller - guitar, vocals
- John Duffey - mandolin, vocals
- Eddie Adcock - banjo, vocals
- Jim Cox - bass, vocals
