= Black Kat Kustoms =

American clothing company

The Black Kat Kustoms logo.

Black Kat Kustoms is an American clothing line and custom parts shop based in Santa Ana, California. The company specializes in custom car, hot rod, and chopper clothing. The clothing line consists of mostly T-shirts, hooded sweatshirts, and beanie caps.

== History ==
The company was founded in 2003 by punk musician Mike Ness of Social Distortion and longtime hot-rodder, Don Nemarnik. Ness states in an interview that he formed Black Kat Kustoms because he "hated everything else" and wanted to design "kustom car, hot rod and chopper t-shirts, so I would have something cool to wear." Ness details his long-time love for designing punk style clothing in the Another State of Mind DVD commentary. He states that his graphic arts class was the only thing that kept him in school during his high school years.

The shop portion of the business is a place for Donnie and Mike to work on their own cars and bikes as a hobby which they occasionally sell.

== See also ==
- Kustom Kulture
