= Bluegrass at Carnegie Hall =

Studio album by The Country Gentlemen
- Released: 1962, reissued 1988
- Recorded: 1962
- Genres: Bluegrass; Progressive bluegrass
- Labels: Starday (1962); Hollywood (1988)
- Producer: The Country Gentlemen

The Country Gentlemen chronology
Folk Songs & Bluegrass (1961)	Bluegrass at Carnegie Hall (1962)	On the Road (1963)

Bluegrass at Carnegie Hall is an album of studio recordings by the progressive bluegrass band The Country Gentlemen, released in 1962 on the Starday label and reissued in 1988. The only thing about this album that has anything to do with Carnegie Hall is the cover photo on the original Starday LP, showing the group on stage (not the photo on the right). Nevertheless, there are many classic tunes on the album from the group's Starday era. As for the actual Carnegie Hall concert, there are six cuts on the Smithsonian Folkways CD "The Country Gentlemen: On the Road"(SFW40133), which include the fine dobro playing of Kenny Haddock.

== Critical reception ==
Professional ratings
Review scores
Source	Rating
Allmusic	4.5/5 stars

Thom Owens of Allmusic gave the album four and half stars out of five, and described it as "a collection of excellent studio recordings... that rank among their finest early recordings."

== Track listing ==
1. "I Know I've Lost You" – 3:03
2. "Nobody's Business" (Idol, Reed) – 2:10
3. "Down Where the Still Waters Flow" – 3:53
4. "Country Concert" – 2:23
5. "A Letter to Tom" (Duffey) – 3:00
6. "Two Little Boys" (trad.) – 3:12
7. "These Men of God" – 2:18
8. "Red Rockin' Chair" – 2:06
9. "I'll Never Marry" – 2:52
10. "Willie Roy, the Crippled Boy" – 3:58
11. "Sunrise" (Rypdal) – 3:15
12. "Silence or Tears" (Gray/Stuart, with lyrics adapted from a Lord Byron poem) – 2:41
13. "New Freedom Bell" (Osborne) – 2:29
14. "The Church Back Home" – 2:30

== Personnel ==
- Charlie Waller - guitar, vocals
- John Duffey - mandolin, vocals
- Eddie Adcock - banjo, vocals
- Tom Gray - bass, vocals
