= Folk Songs & Bluegrass =

Folk Songs & bluegrass

Studio album by The Country Gentlemen
- Released: 1961, reissued in 1988
- Recorded: 1961
- Genre: Bluegrass; Progressive bluegrass
- Length: 43:03
- Label: Folkways Records (1961); Smithsonian Folkways (1988)
- Producer: The Country Gentlemen

The Country Gentlemen chronology
Country Songs, Old and New (1960)	Folk Songs & bluegrass (1961)	Bluegrass at Carnegie Hall (1962)

Professional ratings
Review scores
Source	Rating
Allmusic	4.5/5 stars

Folk Songs & Bluegrass is the second studio album by the progressive bluegrass band The Country Gentlemen, recorded in 1961 and reissued in 1988. Considered one of the best and classical records by the group, it features their 1st classic lineup with Charlie Waller, John Duffey, Tom Gray and Eddie Adcock.

== Track listing ==
1. Train 45 (Traditional) 2:26
2. Little Bessie (Traditional) 3:26
3. The Fields Have Turned Brown (Carter Stanley) 3:00
4. They're At Rest Together (Traditional) 2:56
5. Strutting on the Strings (Eddie Adcock) 2:26
6. Remembrance of You (Pete Roberts) 2:49
7. Red Rocking Chair (John Duffey, William York) 2:00
8. Will the Circle Be Unbroken (Acuff, Christian) 2:50
9. Handsome Molly (Duffey, Kuykendall) 2:26
10. Victim to the Tomb (John Duffey) 3:38
11. Behind These Prison Walls of Love (Bolick, Jarrard) 2:54
12. Wear a Red Rose (John Duffey) 2:06
13. I'm Coming Back, But I Don't Know When (Charlie Monroe) 3:05
14. Southbound (John Duffey) 2:00
15. Come All Ye Tender-Hearted (Traditional) 3:08
16. Standing in the Need of Prayer (Traditional) 1:53

== Personnel ==
- Charlie Waller - guitar, vocals
- John Duffey - mandolin, vocals
- Eddie Adcock - banjo, vocals
- Tom Gray - bass, vocals
