= Born to Kill (album) =

Studio album by Social Distortion
- Released: May 8, 2026
- Recorded: 2023–2026
- Studios: Sunset Sound; Hillside Manor
- Genres: Punk rock; rock and roll
- Length: 45:46
- Label: Epitaph
- Producers: D. Sardy; Mike Ness

Social Distortion chronology
Hard Times and Nursery Rhymes (2011)	Born to Kill (2026)

Singles from Born to Kill
- 1. "Born to Kill" Released: February 25, 2026; 2. "Partners in Crime" Released: April 9, 2026; 3. "The Way Things Were" Released: May 6, 2026; 4. "Tonight" Released: July 8, 2026; 5. "No Way Out" Released: August 17, 2026; 6. "Walk Away (Don't Look Back)" Released: September 3, 2026

Born to Kill is the eighth studio album by American punk rock band Social Distortion, released on May 8, 2026, through Epitaph Records. It is their first studio album in fifteen years, following Hard Times and Nursery Rhymes (2011), marking the longest gap between studio albums to date. It is also Social Distortion's first studio album to feature drummer David Hidalgo Jr., who joined the band just prior to the release of Hard Times and Nursery Rhymes, which featured Josh Freese as a session drummer.

Since its initial planning phase in the early 2010s, the album's development had been plagued by many delays and setbacks, including the band's relentless tour schedules and frontman Mike Ness taking his time on crafting new material until he was satisfied with the results. Pre-production and recording for Born to Kill began in the spring of 2023, but the sessions were postponed when Ness announced that June he had been diagnosed with tonsil cancer. Following his recovery, the band resumed working on the album within the next few years, with production helmed by Ness and Dave Sardy.

== Background ==
=== Early developments ===
Plans for a potential follow-up to Hard Times and Nursery Rhymes were first mentioned as early as late 2010. When asked at the time if Social Distortion had intended to record more albums for Epitaph Records, Ness said, "I would suspect so, yes." Shortly after Hard Times and Nursery Rhymes's release in January 2011, Ness said that there would not be another seven- or eight-year wait between Social Distortion albums, explaining, "Although this record is out, I'm going to continue the process of writing so maybe there won't be such a large gap between records. Even when the record's done, it doesn't mean the creativity of writing is." He reiterated his intentions to get another Social Distortion album out sooner than "too many years" in interviews he gave during mid-to-late-2011. In May 2012, Ness announced that the band was expected to begin writing their eighth studio album in January 2013.

On July 22, 2015, in an interview with Rolling Stone, Ness said he wrote songs that he forgot a few days later. He stated that the band was considering releasing it in 2016 and that some songs that he considered to be filler were getting praise from his bandmates. After a new Social Distortion album did not surface in 2016, Ness confirmed in March 2017 about 20 new songs in various stages of completion, and said that they ranged from garage punk to the gospel-inspired. That same month, Ness told Phoenix New Times that his goal was to be in the studio by fall, and added, "I have to write the record of my career right now. That's the pressure I put on myself." In a June 2018 interview with Edmonton Journal, Ness offered an update on a new album, saying: "I've put a few new songs in the set just to let people know that we're not sitting on our asses at home. It gets people talking, which is nice. But yeah, once we stop touring in November, we'll be ready. I'm thinking that by January we'll be pre-production, but I don't want to rush something out just to get it out."

=== Production ===
Progress on an eighth studio album from Social Distortion continued to be slow by the early-to-mid-2020s. In an interview with The Orange County Register in November 2022, Ness mentioned that, with over 40-50 songs written, Social Distortion had been working on two new albums, with the first to be released in 2023 and the second to be recorded a year later, and added, "That would make people faint. I want to do that, though. I'm going to try to do that. I want to shock people." On April 7, 2023, Ness and the band posted to their Instagram pages that pre-production on a new album was completed and that they would begin recording it on April 17 for an early 2024 release. The album's progress was interrupted by Ness' diagnosis with stage one tonsil cancer, which he publicly announced on June 7, 2023, and as a result, Social Distortion postponed both their upcoming tour dates and work on the album. Ness said of the album's delay: "While it will take a little longer, I promise you that it will be delivered and it will exceed your expectations".

Following Ness' recovery from tonsil cancer, Social Distortion resumed touring and working on their eighth studio album throughout 2024 and 2025. In the May 2024 issue of Guitar World, Ness spoke about the current state of the band: "I was halfway through recording the next album when I got cancer, so that's had to go on hold while I've been working on getting better. I had rough guide vocals laid down, and when I listen to the tracks I think they're some of my best work, so I'm looking forward to finishing the album. It's going to be a really great record. I'm going on the road in the spring, which will be the first time I've sung live since the cancer on my tonsils. I've been doing my therapy and working hard. There's a lot of pressure knowing that I've got shows booked, but it's a good pressure as it puts a lot of focus on my efforts. I guess the album won't be finished until I complete the tour, by which time I hope my voice will be back to full strength, which means the record probably won't be out until 2025. It seems a long way off, but it will be well worth the wait." On September 11, 2025, Ness responded to a social media post by a fan asking a new album could be released. Ness responded by saying, "Look for a sneak single in October". On November 5, 2025, Ness gave an update in a video post on Instagram saying that the first single would be released in January 2026 with the new album expected in the spring of 2026. He said the reason the single was not released as expected in October was due to the band being unable to finish it on time.

=== Release ===
On February 23, 2026, Social Distortion posted a short video to their social media pages of Ness walking down the street kicking a can and then looking up at an image of the band's logo along with the image of a leopard with the words "Born to Kill"; this was later confirmed to be the title of the album, which was released through Epitaph Records on May 8, 2026, with the title track being released as the first single on February 25.

== Critical reception ==
Professional ratings
Aggregate scores
Source	Rating
Metacritic	72/100
Review scores
Source	Rating
AllMusic	3/5 stars
Distorted Sound	8/10
Kerrang!	3/5
New Noise Magazine	5/5 stars
PopMatters	8/10
The Spill Magazine	4/5 stars

According to the review aggregator Metacritic, Born to Kill received "generally favorable reviews" based on a weighted average score of 72 out of 100 from 5 critic scores.

== Track listing ==
All tracks are written by Mike Ness, except "Wicked Game" written by Chris Isaak.

Born to Kill track listing
No.	Title	Length
1.	"Born to Kill"	3:50
2.	"No Way Out"	3:48
3.	"The Way Things Were"	4:34
4.	"Tonight"	4:05
5.	"Partners in Crime"	3:50
6.	"Crazy Dreamer" (featuring Lucinda Williams)	3:48
7.	"Wicked Game" (Chris Isaak cover)	5:34
8.	"Walk Away (Don't Look Back)"	4:13
9.	"Never Goin' Back Again"	3:46
10.	"Don't Keep Me Hanging On"	4:12
11.	"Over You"	4:06
Total length:		45:46

=== Notes ===
- "No Way Out" and "Don't Keep Me Hanging On" both originated from the album White Light, White Heat, White Trash.

== Personnel ==
Personnel taken from Born to Kill liner notes.

Social Distortion

- Mike Ness
- Jonny Wickersham
- Brent Harding
- David Hidalgo Jr.

Additional musicians

- Lucinda Williams – additional vocals on "Crazy Dreamer"
- Josh Jove – additional guitars
- D. Sardy – additional bass guitar, keyboards, piano, percussion, and backing vocals
- Benmont Tench – Hammond organ and upright piano
- Todd O'Keefe – additional backing vocals
- Brett Gurewitz – additional backing vocals

=== Production ===
- D. Sardy – production, mixing
- Mike Ness – production, mixing
- James Monti – engineering, editing
- Cameron Barton – second engineer, guitar technician
- Geoff Neal – additional engineering and editing
- Alex Miller – assistant engineer
- Dan Monti – additional editing
- Stephen Marcussen – mastering
- Pete Lyman – vinyl mastering

== Charts ==
Chart performance for Born to Kill
Chart (2026)	Peak position
Australian Albums (ARIA)	46
Austrian Albums (Ö3 Austria)	2
Belgian Albums (Ultratop Flanders)	90
Belgian Albums (Ultratop Wallonia)	162
Dutch Vinyl Albums (Dutch Charts)	15
Finnish Albums (Suomen virallinen lista)	6
French Physical Albums (SNEP)	26
French Rock & Metal Albums (SNEP)	9
German Albums (Offizielle Top 100)	2
German Rock & Metal Albums (Offizielle Top 100)	1
Japanese Download Albums (Billboard Japan)	59
Japanese Western Albums (Oricon)	23
Scottish Albums (Official Charts)	21
Spanish Albums (Promusicae)	71
Swedish Albums (Sverigetopplistan)	13
Swiss Albums (Schweizer Hitparade)	3
UK Albums Sales (OCC)	30
UK Independent Albums (Official Charts)	13
UK Rock & Metal Albums (Official Charts)	5
US Billboard 200	33
US Independent Albums (Billboard)	5
US Top Rock & Alternative Albums (Billboard)	6
