= The New York Times at Special Bargain Rates =

- Short story by Stephen King
- Country: United States
- Language: English
- Genre: Horror

Publication
- Published in: The Magazine of Fantasy & Science Fiction (1st release); Just After Sunset
- Publication type: Magazine (1st release)
- Media type: Print (Magazine & Hardcover)

"The New York Times at Special Bargain Rates" is a horror short story by American writer Stephen King, originally published in the October/November 2008 issue of The Magazine of Fantasy & Science Fiction, and collected in King's 2008 collection Just After Sunset.

== Plot summary ==
A widow answers a phone call from her husband who died two days earlier in an airplane crash. He is presumably in an afterlife. The husband predicts two tragedies which later come true and helps his wife avoid death herself.

== Adaptation ==
In 2013, The Hollywood Reporter reported that "The New York Times at Special Bargain Rates" was being adapted by Haven writers Sam Ernst and Jim Dunn into a television series titled Grand Central for ABC Signature. When asked about the project in 2016, Jim Dunn said that the series was not moving forward.

== See also ==
- Short fiction by Stephen King
