= Just After Sunset =

Collection of short stories by Stephen King

- First edition cover
- Author: Stephen King
- Language: English
- Genre: Horror fiction
- Publisher: Scribner
- Publication date: November 11, 2008
- Publication place: United States
- Media type: Print (hardcover)
- Pages: 386
- ISBN: 978-1-4165-8408-7
- Preceded by: Everything's Eventual
- Followed by: Full Dark, No Stars

Just After Sunset is the fifth collection of short stories by Stephen King. It was released in hardcover by Scribner on November 11, 2008, and features a holographic dust jacket. On February 6, 2008, the author's official website revealed the title of the collection to be Just Past Sunset. About a month later, the title was subtly changed to Just After Sunset. Previous titles mentioned in the media by Stephen King himself were Pocket Rockets and Unnatural Acts of Human Intercourse.

On February 19, 2008, the author's official site revealed twelve stories that would comprise the collection, mentioning the possibility that one additional "bonus story" could be included, and on April 16 "The Cat from Hell" (a much anthologized but heretofore uncollected short story originally published in 1977) was added to the contents list.

King planned to begin writing a new novel, but after he was asked to edit The Best American Short Stories 2007, he was inspired to write short stories instead.

Upon King's request, a limited edition was released, along with the regular version, featuring a DVD collection of the 25 episodes of the online animated series based on N., one of the stories collected in this volume.

== Stories ==
#	Title	Originally published in
1	"Willa"	December 2006 issue of Playboy
2	"The Gingerbread Girl"	July 2007 issue of Esquire
3	"Harvey's Dream"	June 30, 2003 issue of The New Yorker
4	"Rest Stop"	December 2003 issue of Esquire
5	"Stationary Bike"	Borderlands 5 (2003)
6	"The Things They Left Behind"	Transgressions: Volume Two (2005)
7	"Graduation Afternoon"	March 2007 issue of Postscripts
8	N.	Previously unpublished
9	"The Cat from Hell"	June 1977 issue of Cavalier
10	"The New York Times at Special Bargain Rates"	October/November 2008 issue of The Magazine of Fantasy & Science Fiction
11	"Mute"	December 2007 issue of Playboy
12	"Ayana"	Fall 2007 issue of The Paris Review
13	"A Very Tight Place"	May 2008 issue of McSweeney's

== Connections ==
=== References to other King works in Just After Sunset ===
- N.

N. mentions the town of Castle Rock, where several of King's stories – including The Dead Zone, The Dark Half, and Needful Things – are set. It also mentions the fictional town of Chester's Mill, which is the setting of his later novel Under the Dome. A clipping from the Chester's Mill local paper, the editor of which is a major character in Under the Dome, is part of the nested narrative.

- "Mute"

In part two of this story, the main character recounts how his wife and her lover, "Cowboy Bob," had gone up to Derry and spent a couple of days at a place called Hollywood Slots. The town of Derry, Maine is the setting of King's 1986 novel It and many of his other novels and stories.

== See also ==
- Stephen King short fiction bibliography
