= Ditra Flame =

American musician (1905–1984)

- Born: Ditra Helena Mefford; August 4, 1905; California, U.S.
- Died: February 23, 1984 (aged 78); San Bernardino County, Ontario, California, U.S.
- Other names: Princess Orvella Wilson; The Lady in Black
- Occupations: Musician; Violinist; Vaudeville dancer; Evangelist
- Years active: 1920–1984
- Known for: The original "Lady in Black" mourner of Rudolph Valentino

Ditra Flame (born Ditra Helena Mefford; August 4, 1905 – February 23, 1984), also known by her legal adoptive name Princess Orvella Wilson, was an American musician, vaudeville dancer and religious figure. She gained international notoriety as the original "Lady in Black", a mysterious mourner who visited the crypt of silent film star Rudolph Valentino every year on the anniversary of his death for nearly three decades.

== Early life and the Valentino pact ==
Born in California to Andrew W. Mefford and Sarah Ann Worthy, she was orphaned at a young age and later adopted by a Hollywood family, receiving the legal name Princess Orvella Wilson. As an adult, she adopted the stage name Ditra Flame (pronounced "flah-MAY") for her career as a concert violinist.

Flame claimed her devotion to Valentino began in 1919 when she was around 14 years old. While hospitalized with a severe, life-threatening illness, Valentino—a close friend of her mother—reportedly visited her bedside. According to Flame, he gave her a red rose and told her she would recover. He allegedly requested that if he died first, she should visit his grave so he would not be "lonely", promising to do the same if she predeceased him. Following his sudden death at age 31 in 1926, Flame began an annual ritual of visiting his crypt at Hollywood Forever Cemetery dressed in a heavy black veil and carrying a single red rose.

== Career ==
=== Music ===
Flame was a classically trained violinist. In the late 1920s and 1930s, she led an all-female musical ensemble known as "The Blondes, Brunettes, and Redheads". The group was a popular fixture on the Vaudeville circuit and in Hollywood, often specializing in Mexican and Spanish musical repertoires.

=== The Valentino Memorial Guild ===
In 1947, Flame ended years of media speculation by revealing her identity. She served as the President of the Hollywood Rudolph Valentino Memorial Guild, an organization she claimed to have founded in 1926 to preserve the actor's legacy and organize formal tributes for his international fanbase.

=== Evangelism ===
In the mid-1950s, Flame moved away from the entertainment industry and her public persona as the "Lady in Black". She became a dedicated evangelist, spending approximately 20 years working with a Papago (Tohono O'odham) tribal rescue mission in Arizona and fundraising for the Rose of Sharon Mission.

=== Retirement ===
Flame officially "retired" from her public role as the Lady in Black in 1954. She expressed frustration that the annual event had become a "circus" populated by "publicity hounds" and numerous copycat "Ladies in Black". Despite her public withdrawal, she continued to mourn Valentino privately and made a final recorded visit to the crypt in 1981.

== Death ==
She died of natural causes on February 23, 1984, in Ontario, California. Her home was reportedly found filled with Valentino memorabilia, including a locket and a rosary she claimed were personal gifts from the actor. In a final tribute to the legend she helped create, she was buried in a black dress with a single red flower at San Jacinto Valley Cemetery. Her headstone is inscribed with her adoptive name, her stage name, and the title "The Lady in Black".

== Legacy ==
Flame's ritual created a lasting Hollywood archetype and established the longest-running annual tribute in film history. The Rudolph Valentino Memorial Service continues every August 23 at Hollywood Forever Cemetery, where a designated "Lady in Black" typically appears to place a rose on the crypt in honor of Flame's original promise.

== In popular culture ==
The mystery and folklore of the "Lady in Black" about Ditra Flame have been recurring themes in Hollywood media and music.

- The 1959 country song "Long Black Veil" is widely considered to have been inspired by the myth of the "woman in black" who faithfully visits a grave.
- The 2023 feature film Silent Life: The Story of the Lady in Black, directed by Vladislav Kozlov, explores the legend of Valentino and his mysterious mourner. Oscar-nominated actress Terry Moore played the lead role of the "Lady in Black", portraying a character that serves as an amalgamation of Flame and other historical claimants. The film premiered at the Sedona International Film Festival in February 2023, where it won the Best Indie-Spirit Award.

== See also ==
- Rudolph Valentino
- Hollywood Forever Cemetery
- Silent film
