= The Glencoves =

The Glencoves were a folk pop group formed in 1961 in Mineola, Long Island, New York.

Formed while attending the same high school, members included Don Connors (founder, lead vocals, banjo and guitar), Bill Byrne (vocals), and Brian Bolger (vocals and guitar). After releasing their first single record, the group was joined by John Cadley (vocals and guitar).

Byrne went on to become mayor of Morgantown, WV, and currently serves as Morgantown City Councilor.

Cadley has continued to perform bluegrass music with his band, John Cadley & The Lost Boys, and as half of the duo, The Cadleys (John Cadley and Cathy Wenthen.)

Connors became a photographer, and owned and operated a film and video production company, Don Connors Productions, in New York City. He has continued to sing and play guitar, incorporating additional genres of country, blues and rock music.

The group had a hit single with their Select Records release "Hootenanny", which peaked at #5 or #6 (Billboard and Cashbox) in the local New York market, and landed at #38 on the Billboard Hot 100 in 1963. The song's title refers to the folk singalongs which became popular during the folk revival of the 1960s.
