= Ayana (short story) =

- Short story by Stephen King
- Country: United States
- Language: English
- Genre: Fantasy

Publication
- Published in: The Paris Review, Just After Sunset
- Publication type: Periodical
- Publisher: Drue Heinz
- Media type: Magazine
- Publication date: Fall 2007 (first publication)

"Ayana" is a short story by Stephen King that was originally published in the Fall 2007 issue of The Paris Review, and later included in King's collection Just After Sunset in November of 2008.

== Plot ==
A man recounts his father's battle with pancreatic cancer in 1982, culminating in the intervention of a blind seven-year-old girl named Ayana. After being kissed by the mysterious child, "Doc" Gentry makes a miraculous recovery from the brink of death, and the narrator discovers that his own part in the working of miracles is only beginning. Over the following decades, he describes visits from a man who delivers him to others in need of their own miracles.

== See also ==
- Short fiction by Stephen King
