= The Gingerbread Girl =

Novella by Stephen King

- North American CD audiobook cover
- Author: Stephen King
- Language: English
- Genre: Horror, Suspense
- Published in: Esquire, Just After Sunset
- Publication date: July 2007 (first publication)
- Publication place: United States
- Media type: Magazine
- Preceded by: Willa
- Followed by: Harvey's Dream

The Gingerbread Girl is a novella by American writer Stephen King, originally published in the July 2007 issue of Esquire. It was later included in King's Just After Sunset collection in 2008. The Gingerbread Girl was also released as an audiobook, read by Mare Winningham, by Simon & Schuster Audio on May 6, 2008. The title is an allusion to the fairy tale "The Gingerbread Boy" (also known as "The Gingerbread Man").

== Plot summary ==
After her only daughter, Amy, suffers a crib death, Emily takes up running as a way to deal with her pain. She believes that "only fast running will do"—she pushes her body to its limits, often vomiting and sweating profusely. Her husband, Henry, finds out about this habit, and treats it as a psychological reaction to grief. Emily is hurt and runs out of the house, down to a local Holiday Inn. She contacts her father and explains her situation. After their conversation, Emily decides to stay in her father's summer home, near Naples, Florida. She also speaks with Henry, and the two agree that a trial separation is a good idea.

Emily's life becomes quite simple. She eats plain meals and runs for miles every day. As her body shrinks, she gets to know the few people that hover around the island (Vermillion Key is mostly devoid of tourists). The only person Emily visits is Deke Hollis, an old friend of her father who runs the drawbridge on the island. During a chance meeting, Hollis tells Emily that Jim Pickering, a man who owns an estate on the island, is back. He has brought along a "niece"—Hollis's polite name for the young women who Pickering lures to his home. Emily prepares to continue, but Hollis warns her that Pickering is "not a very nice man."

As Emily continues her daily run, she notices a shiny red car outside a house along the beach that she deduces belongs to Pickering. When Emily approaches the car and discovers a woman whose throat has been slashed, she is knocked unconscious. She wakes up to find herself inside Pickering's house and bound to a wooden chair with duct tape. Emily realizes that Pickering is insane, and hints that she let someone know where she was going. When Pickering presses her for details, Emily blurts out Hollis's name; Pickering leaves, presumably to murder the old man.

Emily knows that she does not have much time, and hears her father's voice in her head, giving her advice. She wobbles the chair to break the tape holding it to the floor then walks it to the fridge, where she smashes the back against it. With a hand loose she grabs a knife and starts to cut herself free. Pickering returns and she attacks him, then escapes out a window to the beach and starts running. Pickering is yards behind her, armed with a pair of scissors.

Though exhausted from her imprisonment, Emily's months of running serve her well. She keeps well ahead of Pickering. Emily encounters a young Latino man on the beach and begs for help, but he doesn't understand her cries. Pickering appears and tries to use Spanish to convince the man that Emily is with him, but Emily's fearful expression convinces the young man otherwise. Enraged, Pickering brutally slaughters the man with his scissors.

Emily, tiring, runs into the ocean. Pickering follows her, but begins to flounder. Emily gasps as she realises that Pickering cannot swim. Emily manages to escape him, and sits on the shoreline to watch as Pickering drowns. Her ordeal over, Emily stands and shouts at the birds flying about, and prepares to go home.

== Critical reception ==
A review in The Observer says the story is "reminiscent of Misery". A review in the San Francisco Chronicle calls it "a harrowing almost-novella, [which] anchors the book and bridges the inner-psyche thrillers of King's 1990s work with his more recent stories. A story of abuse, psychosis and loneliness, it is physically exhausting to read — an astounding thing to say for a short work of fiction." A Toronto Star reviewer calls it "a flat-out suspense novella that could have been penned by Richard Bachman, King's literary alter ego ...[in which] bloody chaos ensues."

== Connection to King's other works ==
A man named Charlie Pickering, a relative of Jim Pickering, appears as a minor antagonist in King's 1994 novel Insomnia.

== Film adaptation ==
In May 2018, it was announced that Brainstorm Media would produce a film adaptation. Craig R. Baxley is set to direct, with the screenplay being written by Baxley and Stephen King.

== See also ==
- Short fiction by Stephen King
