= The Things They Left Behind =

- Short story by Stephen King
- Country: United States
- Language: English
- Genres: Suspense, horror

Publication
- Published in: Transgressions: Volume Two, Transgressions: Terror's Echo (audiobook), Just After Sunset
- Publication type: Anthology
- Media type: Hardcover
- Publication date: 2003

"The Things They Left Behind" is short story by American writer Stephen King, originally published in the compilation Transgressions: Volume Two edited by Ed McBain and published by Forge Books. It is one of three stories that is also available on audiobook compilation, in the "Transgressions" series, titled Terror's Echo and read by John Bedford Lloyd. It was later included in King's own 2008 collection Just After Sunset.

== Plot summary ==
Almost a year after 9/11, strange things start happening to narrator Scott Staley, who—at the time of the attacks—had been employed at "Light and Bell Insurance" on the 110th floor of the World Trade Center. Not only is Scott unable to get rid of his survivor's guilt (on 9/11, he followed an inner voice which told him to take a day off and enjoy the sun), but items belonging to his late colleagues suddenly begin appearing in his apartment. A pair of sunglasses, a baseball bat, a whoopee cushion – Scott can identify them all. After convincing himself that they are no illusion and that others can see them, Scott tries disposing the items in a dumpster. However, they reappear after he returns home.

He explains this to Paula, a neighbor, who offers to stow away one of the things. Soon, Paula experiences the most horrible nightmare of her life. In her own mind, she recreates the last minutes of the item's owner. Paula immediately returns the object, but makes Scott understand his mission: he must give the things to the victims' family members– and on seeing the joy on their faces, he feels his guilt slowly fade away.

== Adaptations in other media ==
The story has been adapted into an extended short film by filmmaker Pablo Macho Maysonet IV, produced by Shattered Dreams Productions.

A new adaptation of the short story directed by Guillaume Heulard and Stéphane Valette is currently in film festivals.

== See also ==
- Short fiction by Stephen King
