= Under the Influences =

Studio album by Mike Ness
- Released: November 9, 1999
- Genre: Rock, bluegrass, country
- Length: 41:15
- Label: Time Bomb Recordings
- Producer: Mike Ness; James Saez

Mike Ness chronology
Cheating at Solitaire (1999)	Under the Influences (1999)

Professional ratings
Review scores
Source	Rating
AllMusic	3/5 stars
Calgary Herald	3/4 stars

Under the Influences is the second album by the American musician Mike Ness, released in 1999. It is a compilation of country, rock, and folk covers, issued the same year as his first solo effort, Cheating at Solitaire.

== Critical reception ==
AllMusic wrote: "With repeated listens, Ness' voice seems monotonous compared to the pure country croon of the original artists. But covers are all about interpretation, and what Ness lacks in vocal finesse he makes up for with feeling."

== Track listing ==
1. "All I Can Do Is Cry" (Wayne Walker) – 2:51
2. "Gamblin' Man" (Marvin Rainwater) – 2:27
3. "Let The Jukebox Keep On Playing" (Carl Perkins) – 3:12
4. "I Fought the Law" (Sonny Curtis) – 2:49
5. "Big Iron" (Marty Robbins) – 4:32
6. "One More Time" (Harlan Howard) – 2:48
7. "Six More Miles" (Hank Williams) – 2:41
8. "A Thief in the Night" (Harlan Howard) – 2:48
9. "Once a Day" (Bill Anderson) – 2:31
10. "Funnel of Love" (Charlie McCoy, Kent Westbury) – 2:36
11. "House of Gold" (Hank Williams) – 2:45
12. "Wildwood Flower" (A.P. Carter) – 3:21
13. "Ball and Chain (Honky Tonk)" (Mike Ness) – 5:54

== Charts ==
Chart (1999)	Peak position
US Billboard 200	174
