= The Cat from Hell =

- Short story by Stephen King
- Country: United States
- Language: English
- Genre: Horror

Publication
- Published in: Cavalier, Tales of Unknown Horror, Year's Finest Fantasy, Magicats!, Twists of the Tale: An Anthology of Cat Horror, Duma Key; Just After Sunset
- Publication type: Magazine
- Media type: Print (Paperback)
- Publication date: March 1977

"The Cat from Hell" is a horror short story by American writer Stephen King, first published in 1977.

== Plot summary ==
Halston, a professional hitman, is offered $12,000 (equivalent to $64,000 in 2025) to take out an unusual target—a cat. He accepts, despite being told that the cat was implicated in the murders of three people. He soon discovers that the cat is much more than it seems—the employer reveals that his company tortured and destroyed thousands of cats in the name of research, and he believes this cat is a feline emissary of revenge.

While the hitman is driving toward a desolate place to kill it, the cat escapes confinement and eventually attacks him—crawling inside his body to finish the job—after he is temporarily paralyzed in the resulting accident. After killing the hitman, the cat leaves on "unfinished business" to go after the hitman's employer.

== Publication ==
King initially published the first 500 words of the story in March 1977 in Cavalier, and the magazine held a contest for readers to finish the story. The winning entry, as well as King's complete story, was published in the magazine in June of the same year. It also appeared in Gent Vol. 18 #6 (December 1977), credited to King and Marc Rains. King revised the story and it was reprinted in Tales of Unknown Horror (1978), in Year's Finest Fantasy (1978), in Magicats! (1984), and again in Twists of the Tale: An Anthology of Cat Horror (1996). This story was also adapted to film in the anthology film Tales from the Darkside: The Movie (1990). It was later reprinted as a bonus story in the paperback edition of Duma Key and again in Just After Sunset, Stephen King's fifth collection of short stories.

== See also ==
- Short fiction by Stephen King
