= A Very Tight Place =

Novella by Stephen King

- Short story by Stephen King
- Language: English
- Genre: Horror

Publication
- Published in: Timothy McSweeney's Quarterly Concern; Just After Sunset
- Publisher: McSweeney's; Scribner
- Publication date: 2008
- Publication place: United States
- Media type: Print

A Very Tight Place is a novella by Stephen King, originally published in the May 2008 issue of McSweeney's, and collected in King's 2008 collection Just After Sunset.

== Plot summary ==
Curtis Johnson, a middle-aged gay gentleman, is lured to a deserted construction site by his neighbor, Tim Grunwald, with whom he has been having legal disputes involving property rights and Curtis's beloved Löwchen, Betsy, who was killed by Tim's electric fence. He is confronted by Tim who forces him into a portable toilet, locks him in, and tips it down an embankment, leaving him trapped there in the heat of a Florida summer day to die. With no way to get help, Curtis must figure out how to escape or die.

Eventually, after a long night asleep in the Port-O-San, Curtis discovers he can crawl through the toilet and into the tank where he can unscrew the bolts using Betsy's old dog tag. After a brief struggle, he gets out and makes his way to the house of Tim, who is lounging in his hot tub. Curtis surprises Tim by throwing an old, unplugged hair dryer into the tub. He then jumps into the hot tub with him and gives him a “baptismal dunk,” almost drowning him. Then, he lets him know that not only is he alive, but if Tim ever tells the police about the attempted drowning, Curtis will simply tell them Tim tried to kill him first.

Two days later Curtis tells his maid he's thinking of getting a puppy. He hears a gunshot from Tim's house and suggests that they go next door to see if Tim is okay –– "after all, what are neighbors for?"

== See also ==
- Short fiction by Stephen King
