= Rest Stop (short story) =

- Short story by Stephen King
- Country: United States
- Language: English
- Genre: Short story

Publication
- Published in: Esquire (December 2003); Just After Sunset
- Publication type: Print
- Media type: Magazine, Hardback & Paperback
- Publication date: 2003 (first publication)

"Rest Stop" is a short story by the American writer Stephen King, originally published in the December 2003 issue of Esquire and collected in King's 2008 collection Just After Sunset. In 2004, "Rest Stop" won the National Magazine Award for Fiction.

== Plot synopsis ==
Author John Dykstra, who writes under the pen name Rick Hardin, has had too much beer to drink at his mystery writer's group meeting and desperately needs to find a rest stop on his return home to Sarasota, Florida. There is only one other car at the rest stop, and he overhears its occupants in the ladies' bathroom. He hears a woman's and a man's voice coming from the bathroom, and the sounds of domestic abuse.

Dykstra is too timid and frightened to act, but he assumes the mentality of his alter-ego, Hardin, and attacks the man with a tire iron. Hardin calls the police and orders the woman to leave the scene in the car, and much to her protest, Hardin smashes the man's glasses to ensure the man doesn't follow him on the road in retaliation.

After some time, Hardin mentally reverts to Dykstra, who begins to vomit out the side of his vehicle when the adrenaline rush of the incident wears off. He stops at a gas station and thoroughly searches to make sure the man has not followed him. Upon returning home, Dykstra locks his doors and activates his burglar alarm.

== Adaptation ==
In April 2019, it was announced that Legendary Entertainment would develop a film adaptation of the short story, with Alex Ross Perry set to write and direct.

== See also ==
- Short fiction by Stephen King
