= Transgressions: Volume Two =

Trangressions: Volume Two
- Publication date: 2006

Trangressions: Volume Two contains short stories by two modern writers, John Farris and Stephen King, edited by Ed McBain. The audiobook version, in the "Transgressions" series, is titled Terror's Echo.

Written by an author who some consider a modern master of horror fiction, King's "The Things They Left Behind" is the story of a man who didn't go to work on 9/11 and goes to work after the event, finding things his coworkers left behind. Farris's "The Ransome Women" is a thriller about a mysterious painter and the fate of the woman he paints.
