= Cheating at Solitaire =

Studio album by Mike Ness
- Released: April 13, 1999
- Recorded: 1998
- Genre: Rock, rock and roll, folk, country, roots rock, Americana, Cowpunk
- Label: Time Bomb
- Producer: Mike Ness, James Saez

Mike Ness chronology
Cheating at Solitaire (1999)	Under the Influences (1999)

Professional ratings
Review scores
Source	Rating
AllMusic	4/5 stars
Robert Christgau	(neither)

Cheating at Solitaire is the first solo album from Social Distortion frontman Mike Ness. Released in 1999, it is a roots-oriented approach to rock and roll. It features cameos by Bruce Springsteen, Brian Setzer, and members of Royal Crown Revue. Johnny Cash was invited to perform on the song "Ballad of a Lonely Man", but was too ill to record at the time.

"Dope Fiend Blues" and "I'm In Love w/My Car" were originally written/recorded in 1994 as a demo of Social Distortion's fifth album White Light, White Heat, White Trash. Ness also originally wrote some of the songs on this album around 1997 while Social Distortion was planning their sixth album.

== Track listing ==
All tracks are written by Mike Ness, except where noted.

No.	Title	Writer(s)	Length
1.	"The Devil in Miss Jones"		3:49
2.	"Don't Think Twice"	Bob Dylan	3:47
3.	"Misery Loves Company"		3:47
4.	"Crime Don't Pay"		3:31
5.	"Rest of Our Lives"		3:44
6.	"You Win Again"	Hank Williams
7.	"Cheating at Solitaire"		3:53
8.	"No Man's Friend"		4:57
9.	"Charmed Life"		3:38
10.	"Dope Fiend Blues"		5:17
11.	"Ballad of a Lonely Man"		3:25
12.	"I'm in Love with My Car"		4:41
13.	"If You Leave Before Me"		4:19
14.	"Long Black Veil"	Danny Dill, Marijohn Wilkin	4:04
15.	"Send Her Back"	Al Ferrier	2:57
Total length:			59:00

=== Vinyl Version ===
No.	Title	Length
16.	"Company C"	5:03
Total length:		1:04:03

== Personnel ==
- Bob Breen – assistant engineer
- Jolie Clemens – artwork
- Tom Corbett – mandolin
- Mando Dorame – tenor saxophone
- Paul Ericksen – assistant engineer
- Josh Freese – drums, snare drums
- Daniel Glass – drums, snare drums
- Martin Klemm – mixing assistant
- Chris Lawrence – guitar, pedal steel
- Veikko Lepisto – electric bass, upright bass
- Jamie Muhoberac – keyboards, Hammond organ
- Mike Ness – acoustic guitar, guitar, vocals, producer, artwork, mixing
- James Saez – acoustic guitar, guitar, percussion, keyboards, producer, engineer, slide guitar, mixing
- F. Scott Schafer – photography
- Eddy Schreyer – mastering
- Brian Setzer – guitar (on "Crime Don't Pay")
- Bruce Springsteen – guitar, vocals (on "Misery Loves Company")
- Billy Zoom – guitar (on "Dope Fiend Blues")

== Charts ==
Chart (1999)	Peak position
US Billboard 200	80
