= Graduation Afternoon =

2007 short story by Stephen King

- Short story by Stephen King
- Country: United States
- Language: English
- Genre: Horror

Publication
- Published in: Postscripts
- Publisher: PS Publishing
- Media type: Print (magazine)
- Publication date: March 2007

"Graduation Afternoon" is a short story by American writer Stephen King, originally published in the March 2007 issue of Postscripts, and collected in King's 2008 book Just After Sunset.

== Plot summary ==
The story tells of a young woman enjoying her wealthy boyfriend's high school graduation party at his suburban Connecticut home when events take an unexpected turn.

== Critical response ==
PopMatters compared the ending of the story to Two Suns in the Sunset by Pink Floyd. M. John Harrison at The Guardian called it an "elegiac and old-fashioned end-of-the-world piece." Matt Thorne at The Independent said the horror in Graduation Afternoon "is not just a premonition of something that could happen, but something that would happen."

== Adaptations ==
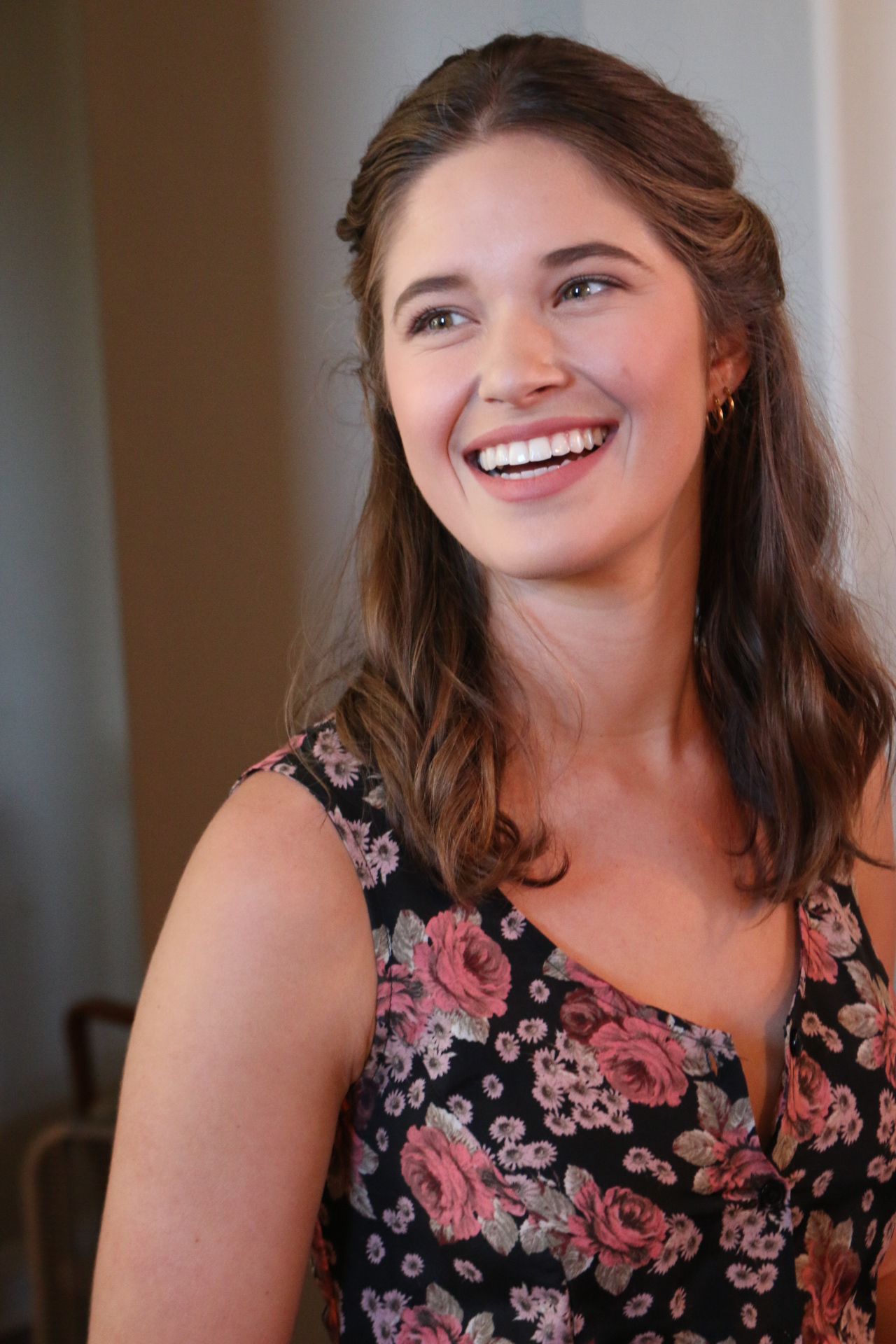
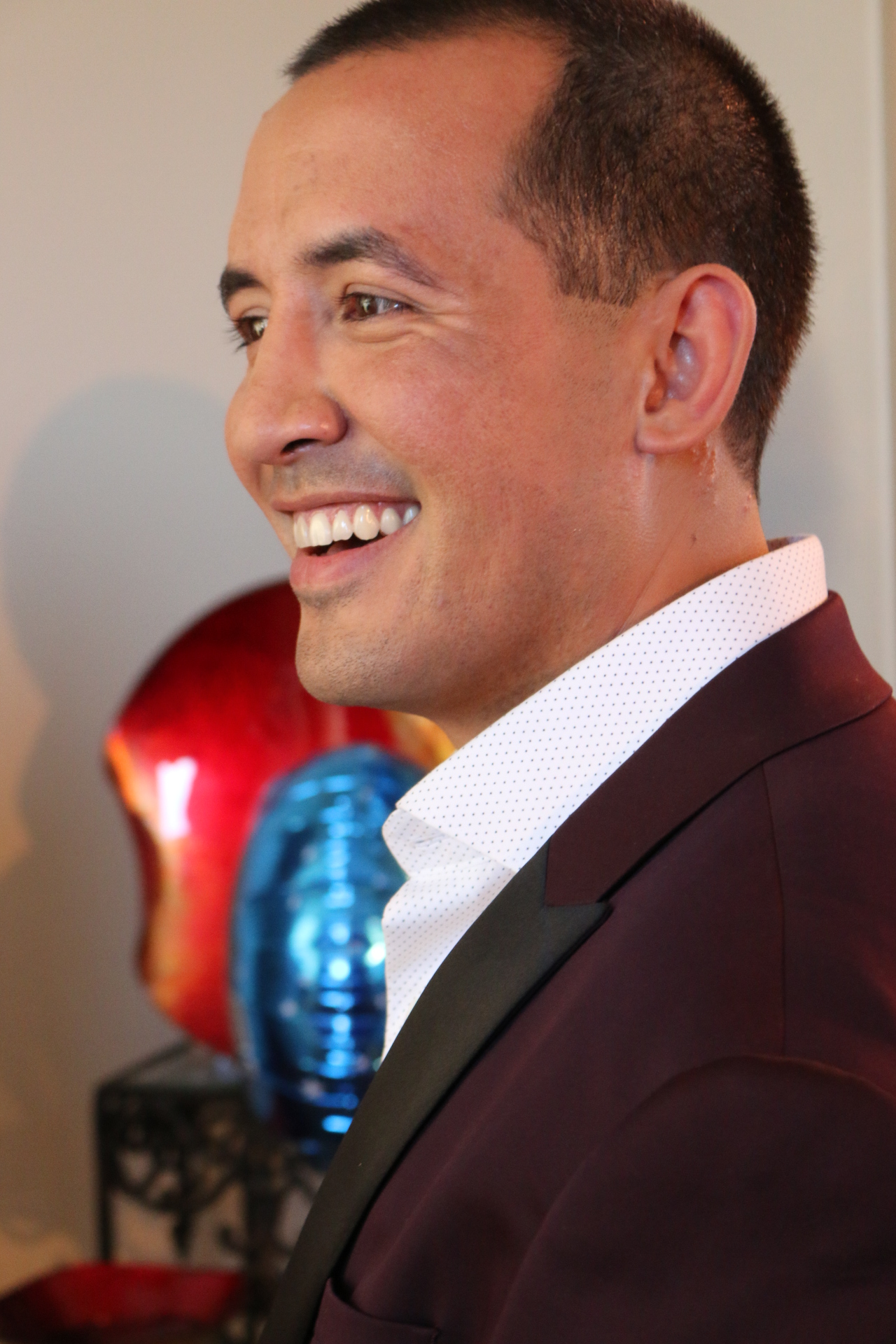
From left to right: Jade Kaiser and George Jac in Graduation Afternoon (2021).

The story was adapted by Marie D. Jones into a short film in 2019 as part of Dollar Baby and released on January 10, 2021. The film stars George Jac, Jade Kaiser, Diane Sargent, Noor Razooky, and Brian Patrick Butler.

Jones chose to adapt the story because it was one of King's shorter Dollar Baby choices. It was shot over three weekends during the Spring and Summer 2019 and Rob Padilla Jr. directed the film.

Steve Hutchinson at Tales of Terror said it was a quality film that is relatable because the filmmakers connected Donald Trump. Adam Groves at The Bedlam Files said "the film isn’t very invigorating."

== See also ==
- Short fiction by Stephen King
