= Mike Ness =

American musician (born 1962)

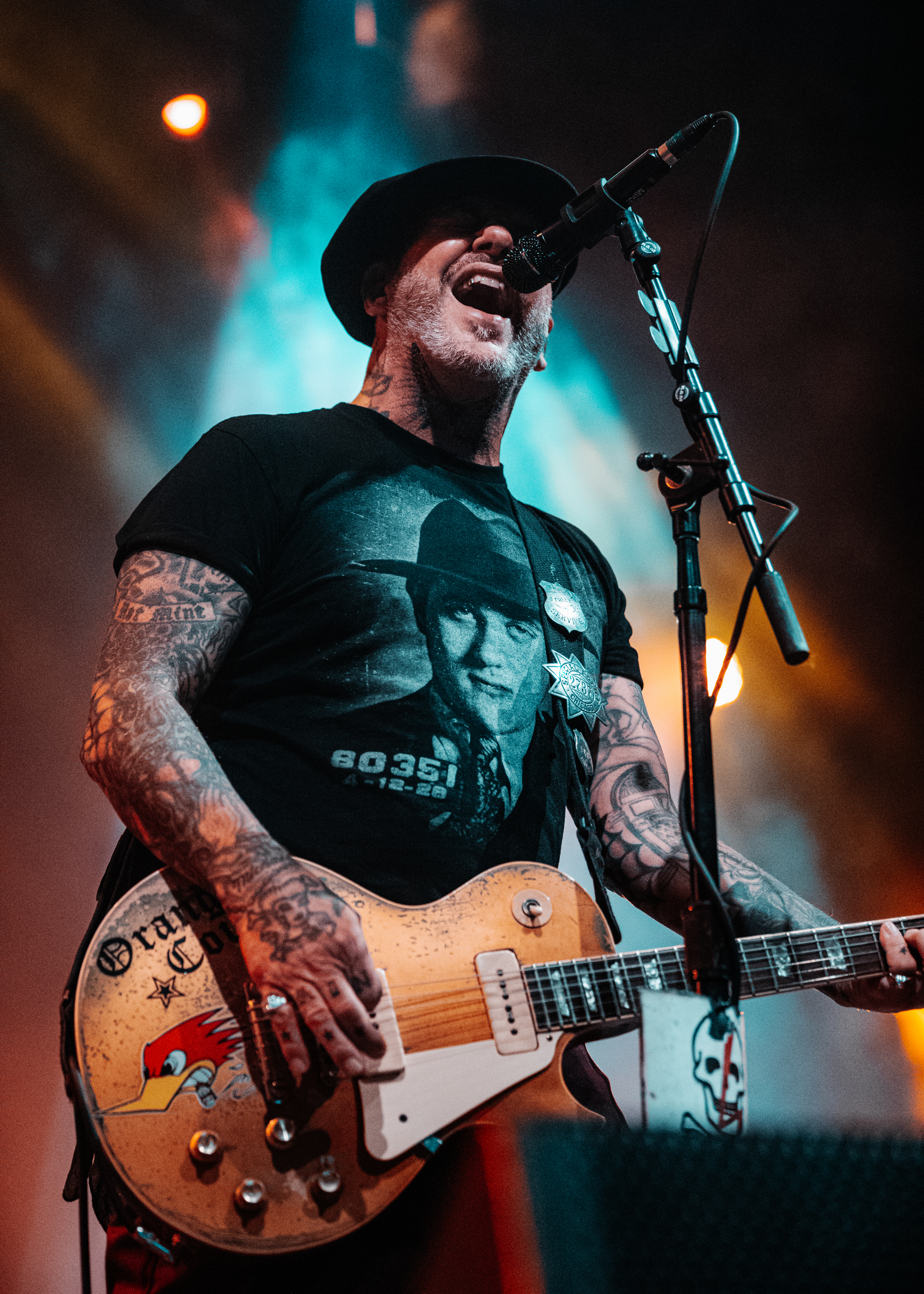
- Ness at the House of Blues Las Vegas in 2022

Background information
- Born: Michael James Ness; April 3, 1962 (age 64); Stoneham, Massachusetts, U.S.
- Origin: Orange County, California, U.S.
- Genres: Punk rock; cowpunk; roots rock; hardcore punk (early)
- Occupations: Musician, singer, songwriter, producer
- Instruments: Vocals, guitar
- Years active: 1978–present
- Member of: Social Distortion
- Formerly of: Easter
- Website: mikeness.com

Michael James Ness (born April 3, 1962) is an American musician who is the lead guitarist, lead vocalist and songwriter for the punk rock band Social Distortion, which was formed in 1978. He has also released two solo albums, Cheating at Solitaire and Under the Influences (both 1999).

== Early life ==
Ness was born in Stoneham, Massachusetts on April 3, 1962. His family relocated to Orange County, California, later that year, and he grew up in Fullerton. As a child, he idolized gangsters such as John Dillinger and Bonnie and Clyde. At a young age, his parents divorced and he was later kicked out of his father and stepmother's home in Fullerton when he was around 15 or 16 years old for incorrigible behavior.

During his early years, Ness was raised on the blues, country and early rock and roll, and he grew up listening to the Beatles, the Rolling Stones, Johnny Cash, the Supremes, Creedence Clearwater Revival, Led Zeppelin, Lou Reed, David Bowie, ZZ Top, Kiss and Bad Company. As he drifted around Orange County, Ness became involved in the punk rock scene.

In the 1980s, Ness was the original renter of the one-bedroom apartment described in the Adolescents song "Kids of the Black Hole". The punk house is located in Fullerton and still exists today.

== Career ==
Inspired by The Sex Pistols, Ness founded Social Distortion in 1978 with Casey Royer. He later recruited his high school friend Dennis Danell into the band in 1979, and Ness dropped out of high school at age 17 to focus on his music career. Social Distortion released the Mainliner/Playpen 7" record on Robbie Field's indie label Posh Boy Records in 1981. Two years later, they released the album Mommy's Little Monster (1983) on 13th Floor Records, which was owned by Monk Rock, their manager at the time.

Ness was featured in the independent film Another State of Mind, which chronicled Social Distortion's first cross-country tour with Youth Brigade. It was on the DVD commentary where he claimed to have never had anything to do with the armed forces or religion. This prompted many fans to consider him an atheist, though some of his lyrics seem to indicate otherwise. Five years passed before Social Distortion released their next album, 1988's Prison Bound, on the heels of Ness's recovery from drug addiction.

Ness performed in the band Easter from 1986 until 1988 and appeared in the music video for the songs "Slipping Away" and "Lights Out". In 1989, Social Distortion signed a deal with Epic Records and released three albums with that label: Social Distortion (1990), Somewhere Between Heaven and Hell (1992) and White Light, White Heat, White Trash (1996).

The band left Epic Records after White Light, White Heat, White Trash (1996). A series of reissues in addition to a live album were released on Time Bomb Recordings, including Mainliner: Wreckage From the Past (a collection of old recordings and singles that were done in the early '80s), the long out-of-print Mommy's Little Monster, a re-issue of their second album Prison Bound, and Live at the Roxy (1998).

In 1999, Ness released his first solo album, Cheating at Solitaire. Although some of Social Distortion's songs paid homage to country music artists, Cheating at Solitaire was an unalloyed expression of Ness' country influences. Solitaire included guest appearances by Bruce Springsteen, Brian Setzer, Billy Zoom and Josh Freese, as well as members of Royal Crown Revue. Springsteen had touted Social Distortion's Heaven and Hell as his favorite record of the year in a Rolling Stone interview in 1992.

Ness continued in this vein, releasing a compilation of country covers entitled Under the Influences that same year. Both albums came out on Time Bomb Recordings. Ness toured extensively in the US in support of these albums, backed by the 2006 partial incarnation of Social Distortion: ex-Plugz and Bob Dylan drummer Charlie Quintana and Brent Harding (upright and electric bass). Ness and the band played at Woodstock '99.

Childhood friend and founding member of Social Distortion guitarist Dennis Danell died on February 29, 2000, at 38 due to a brain aneurysm. According to other sources, the Orange County Coroner's Office lists his death as "Idiopathic Dilated Cardiomyopathy." Ness was devastated, stating "I am saddened beyond any possible form of expression. Dennis and I have been friends since boyhood, starting Social Distortion together while we were in high school. My deepest regrets to his family."

Social Distortion went back to work in June 2000 on the album Sex, Love and Rock 'n' Roll. Many of the songs on this new album are dedicated to Danell, such as "Don't Take Me For Granted", "Reach for the Sky" and "Angel's Wings". At an October 2010 concert in New York City Ness dedicated "Don't Take Me For Granted" to Joey Ramone.

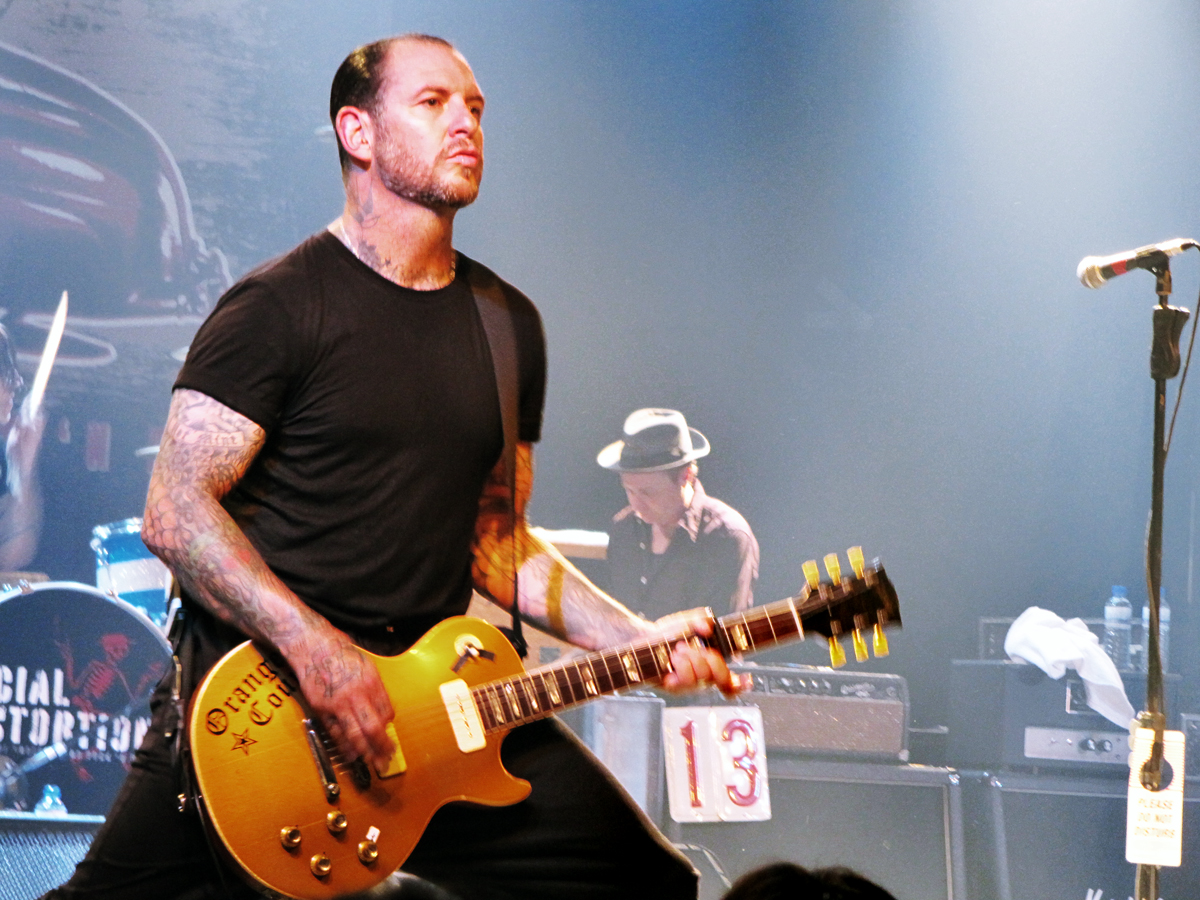
Mike Ness live in Madrid in 2009

In 2003, Social Distortion recorded a live DVD called Live in Orange County at the House of Blues in Anaheim, California which was released in 2004 along with Sex, Love and Rock 'n' Roll, both of which were released on Time Bomb Recordings.

These efforts marked the first recordings with a line-up consisting of Ness on guitar and vocals, Wickersham replacing Danell on guitar, and Quintana on drums. It also consisted of a number of songs co-written by Ness and Wickersham. This is the first time Ness collaborated with another songwriter since his 1990 self-titled album, on which he and then bassist John Maurer wrote "So Far Away". The band's lineup changed twice after Maurer left the band, just a month before the release of Sex, Love and Rock 'n' Roll.

In February 2006, Ness broke his wrist while skateboarding in Las Vegas. He continued to perform vocals on the tour while T.S.O.L. guitarist Ron Emory filled in on guitar until Ness recovered from the injury. On January 18, 2007, former Social Distortion bass player Brent Liles died after being hit by a tractor trailer truck. Ness dedicated a performance at the Anaheim House of Blues to him shortly after.

Despite earlier reports that the band would begin recording their next studio album by 2008, Social Distortion took a hiatus from touring and recording, when Ness was on tour with his solo band which is composed of two current members of Social Distortion, Brent Harding and Jonny Wickersham.

Also touring with Ness were Chris Lawrence on Telecaster and pedal steel guitar and Dave Raven on drums. In a July 2009 interview with Tarakany! Bad TV, Ness stated that Social Distortion was planning to return to the studio in December of that year or the beginning of 2010 to begin recording their seventh album. The album, now known as Hard Times and Nursery Rhymes, was finally released on January 18, 2011.

On May 17, 2008, Ness and his band were joined on stage by Bruce Springsteen at the Stone Pony in Asbury Park, New Jersey for the encore. Songs played were "Misery Loves Company", "Ball and Chain", "If You Leave Before Me" and "I Fought the Law".

On April 16, 2009, Ness joined Springsteen and the E Street Band on stage at the Los Angeles Sports Arena. Songs played included Social Distortion's "Bad Luck" and Springsteen's "The Rising". On May 18, 2009, Mike Ness and Social Distortion played a benefit show at the House of Blues in Anaheim, California called "Rock to Recovery" and his son joined him on stage and played lead guitar for the song "Ball and Chain".

On April 7, 2023, Ness and Social Distortion posted to their Instagram pages that pre production on the band's next album was completed and that they would begin recording on April 17. The album was expected to be released in early 2024. However, in June 2023, recording was postponed due to Ness being diagnosed with tonsil cancer. On December 12, 2023, Social Distortion announced that they would be doing a co-headlining tour with Bad Religion in April and May 2024 and they will perform Mommy’s Little Monster in its entirety to celebrate the album's 40th anniversary. Social Distortion will also do their own headlining tour in September and October 2024.Born to Kill, Social Distortion's eighth studio album, their first in fifteen years, was released on May 8, 2026.

== Personal life ==
Ness currently lives in Santa Ana, California with his wife Christine and two sons. He is an avid collector of vintage ephemera such as Hamburglar toys and hot rods, owning a 1954 Chevrolet and a 1936 Ford. In 2003, he founded Black Kat Kustoms with "long time hot rodder and builder" Don Nemarnik. Black Kat Kustoms is an expression of his love for hot rods, cats, bikes, Alpine horns and counter-culture clothing.

In a 2015 interview with Eric Walden, he said in reference to the song "Ball and Chain", "It was basically, 'I've seen God,' I guess if you will — God of my understanding; I'm not a religious guy; I do consider myself a spiritual man."

On June 7, 2023, Ness announced that he was diagnosed with stage one tonsil cancer and is expected to make a full recovery from surgery. Ness said that it is "a day-by-day process and in three weeks we start radiation and that should be the last therapy I need."

On March 4, 2026, Ness described his recovering process as part of "The Road to Born to Kill", a short documentary about the eponymous album. Ness said that "The only singing I got to really do during the healing period, I just found myself kind of writing some country songs. This melody and riff for "Warn Me" came out and you know, I've written about hard times in the past, but it's different when you're writing about someone dying that you love or walking through uncomfortability or fear or sadness. This was a different kind of hardship. You know, I mean, change your whole life perspective."

The singer also said that helping recovering addicts and alcoholics like himself gave him strength to continue. Ness said, "If my higher power still wants me here, I was kind of saying, "Hey, well if you do want me here, I do have these purposes." One is I'm a recovering alcoholic and drug addict. I still am in that community spreading the message without being a flag waiver, leading by example of what you can accomplish in a clean and sober lifestyle."

== Equipment ==
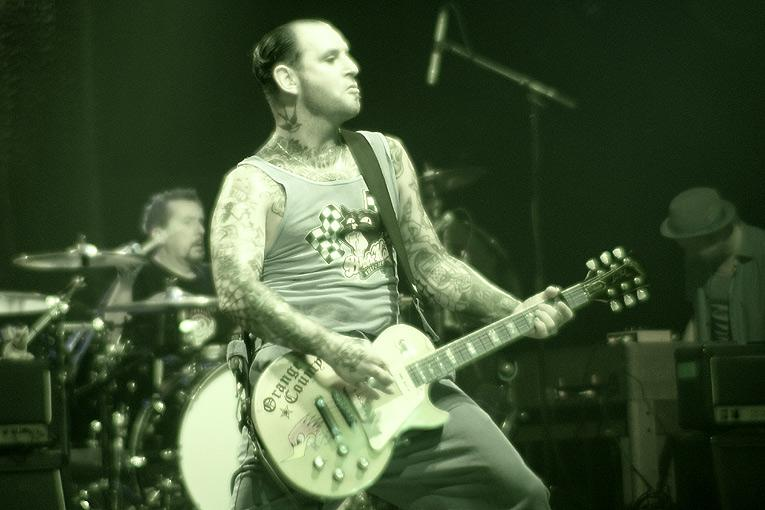
Goldtop Les Paul with decals

=== Electric guitars ===
Early in his career, Ness was seen using Gibson SGs and SG Juniors, most notably a black 1970's SG covered in stickers as seen on the cover of the compilation album Mainliner: Wreckage from the Past. He currently uses four 1970s Gibson Les Paul Deluxes (two sunburst models from 1971 & 1975, and two goldtop models from 1975 & 1976). His 1976 goldtop is his favorite and most used guitar currently, however his 1971 sunburst was his main guitar for many years, especially through the 1990s. Ness uses Eb Standard tuning and usually uses a capo on the second fret while using his goldtops. He has used Seymour Duncan P-90 pickups in all of his guitars since touring with Neil Young in the early 1990s; Ness recalled seeing Young's guitar tech take the stock mini humbucker pickups out of a Les Paul Deluxe, throw them in the trash and replace them with the P-90s. Ness' goldtops have maple necks which he says contribute to his tone especially when using a capo on the second fret. He also once used a non-reverse Gibson Firebird, as seen on the back cover of Social Distortion's 1983 debut Mommy's Little Monster, and a white Gibson Les Paul Custom in the "Ball and Chain" and "Story of My Life" music videos.

=== Acoustic guitars ===
In an interview with Guitar.com Ness said: "The guitar that I write on is a 1940 Gibson J-45. I have three of them – I searched high and low for them. I had a 1940 Martin D-18 that I sold last year; I'm just a Gibson guy. I gravitate to the Gibson J-45 every time I write. It's a balladeer's guitar". Ness also plays a 1939 Gibson J-35, that he says "...very rarely leaves the house...".

=== Amplifiers ===
Ness uses Fender Bassman amps modified by Fred Taccone of Divided by 13 through Marshall 4x12 slant cabs with Celestion Greenback speakers. Most of his touring amps were modded by Billy Zoom of the band X. Zoom's modifications include a wattage switch to select between 40, 20 or 10 watts, and replacing the bass channel with a higher gain channel. The only effect pedal Ness uses live is an overdrive, previously a Boss SD-1 and currently a Klon Centaur, though he has used various delays in the studio.

== Discography ==
=== Solo ===
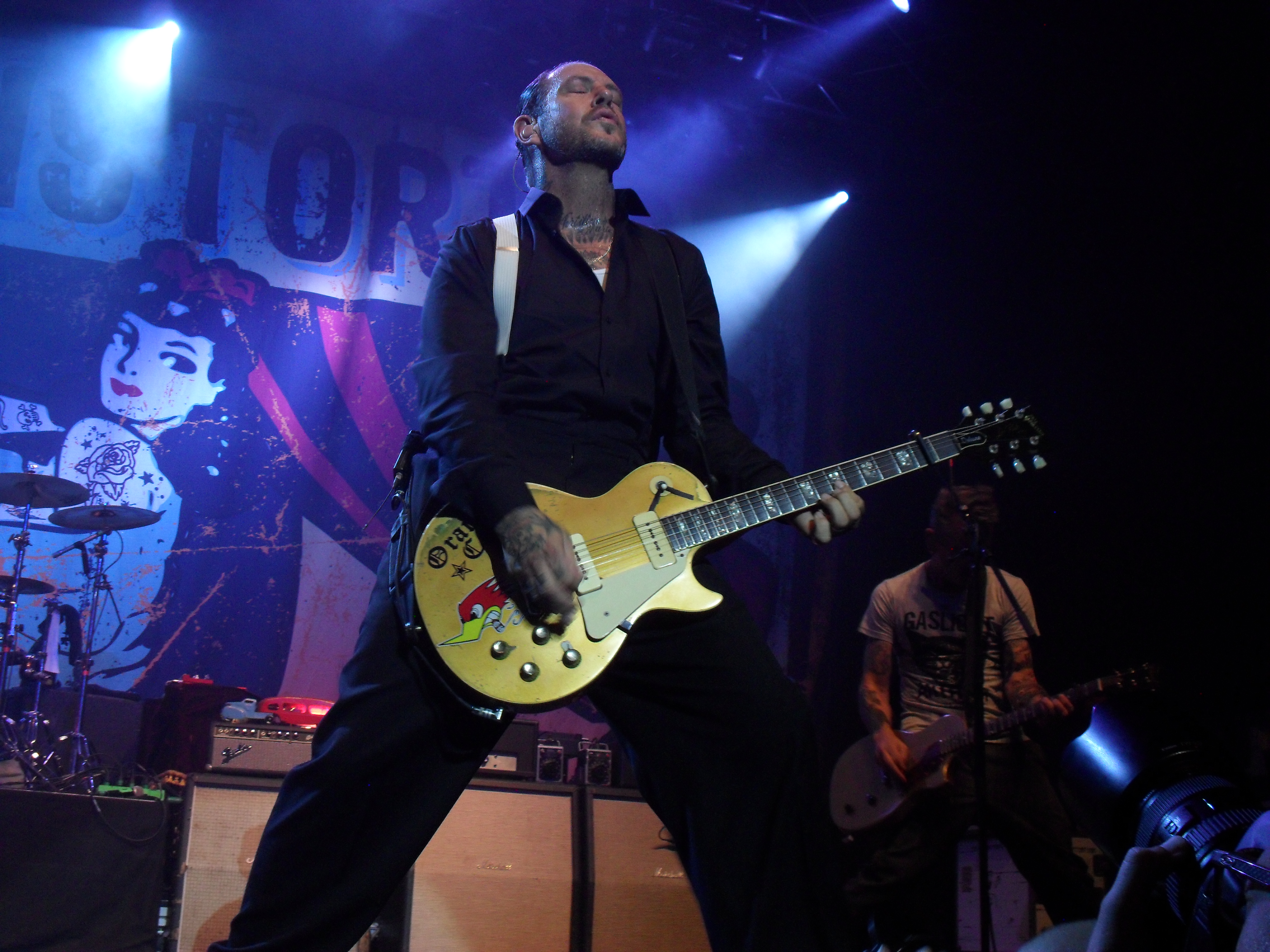
Ness during a Social Distortion concert in Tilburg in 2012

- Cheating at Solitaire (1999)
- Under the Influences (1999)

=== Social Distortion ===
- Mommy's Little Monster (1983)
- Prison Bound (1988)
- Social Distortion (1990)
- Somewhere Between Heaven And Hell (1992)
- White Light, White Heat, White Trash (1996)
- Live at the Roxy (1998)
- Sex, Love and Rock 'n' Roll (2004)
- Hard Times and Nursery Rhymes (2011)
- Born to Kill (2026)

=== Other appearances ===
- The Band Easter (1980)
- Another State of Mind (1984)
- Frezno Smooth
- Easter (1986–1988)
- Live at the Hootenanny, Vol. 1 (2000)
- Live in Orange County (2004)
- Punk's Not Dead (2007)
