= José Fors =

Mexican singer & artist (born 1958)

José Fors Ferro
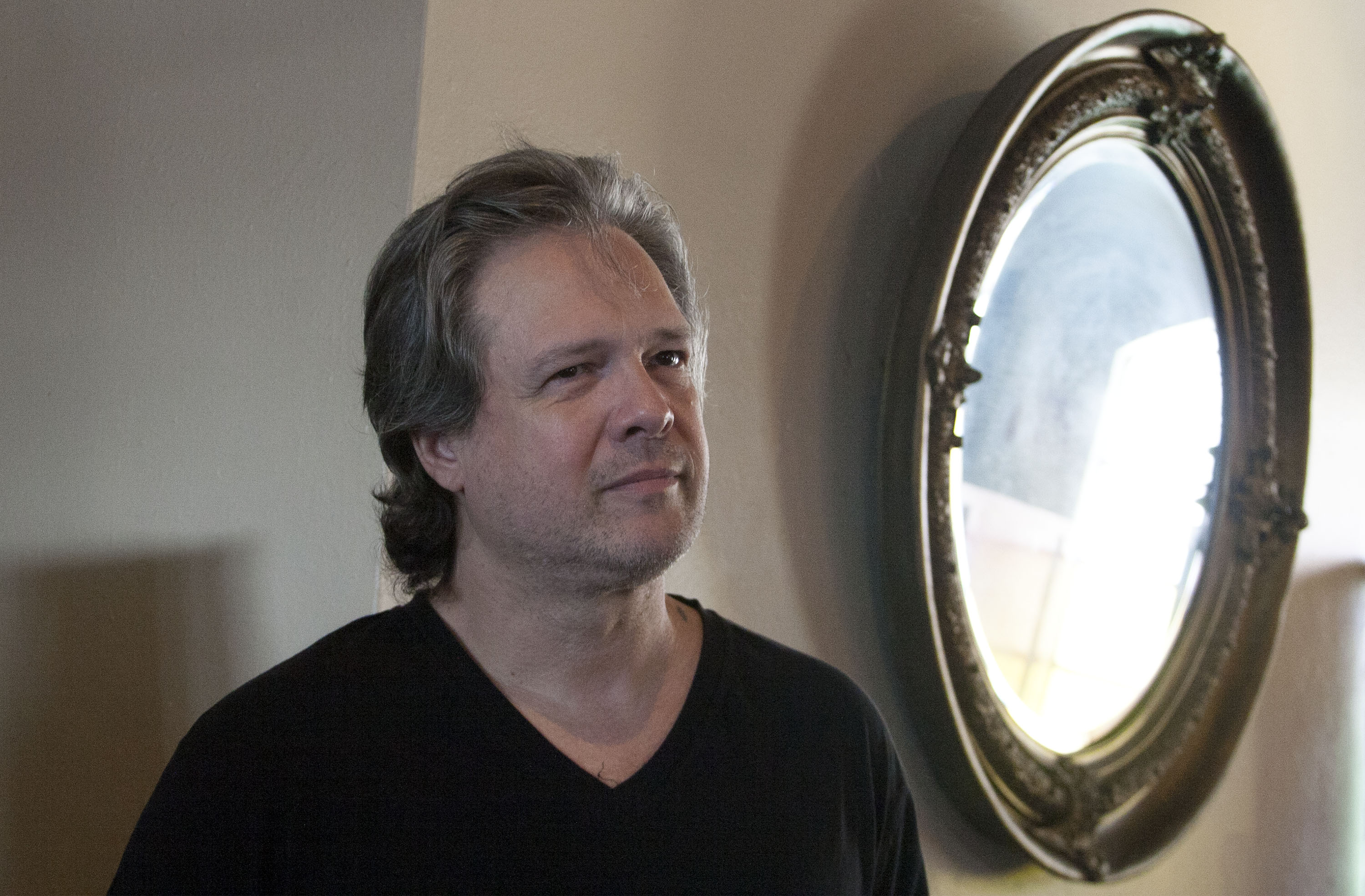

Background information
- Born: José Alberto Fors Ferro; 30 July 1958 (age 68) Havana, Cuba
- Origin: Guadalajara, Mexico
- Genres: Hard rock Heavy metal Experimental music
- Occupations: Musician songwriter
- Instruments: Vocals guitar
- Years active: 1990–present

José Fors Ferro (born 30 July 1958) is a Mexican singer and artist best known as the leading member of the bands Cuca and Forseps.

== Biography ==
Fors was born in Havana, Cuba, in 1958. At the age of three he and his family moved to Miami, Florida escaping Castro's communism. There he studied painting. In 1967 his family moved to Mexico City, where he lived for the remainder of his childhood. Later on he moved again to Guadalajara where he has lived most of his life. In 1976 he studied anatomical drawing with Robert Martinez and started working with musical groups such as Mask and Lepra. In 1985 he developed an ambitious project with Carlos Esegé (née Carlos Sanchez-Gutierrez) called Duda Mata. In 1990, along with Ignacio González (drums), Galileo Ochoa (guitar) and Carlos Avilez (bass), he founded Cuca, a group that interprets irreverent songs in a hard rock style. In 1994 he left Cuca to initiate a new project, Forseps. In 2004 Cuca returned to the stage and recorded a live record on 14 May 2004. In 2005 he returned to the studio to record the album Con Pelotas. Fors currently lives in Guadalajara.

== Discography ==
=== With Mask ===
- The Fox, 1985

=== With Duda Mata ===
- Duda Mata, 1987

=== With Cuca ===
- La Invasión de los Blátidos, 1992
- Tu Cuca Madre Ataca de Nuevo, 1993
- El Cuarto de Cuca, 1997
- Viva Cuca, 2004
- Con Pelotas, 2006
- La Venganza De Cucamonga, 2016
- semen, 2017

=== With Forseps ===
- Bebé Mod.01, 1995
- .02, 2000
- 333: El Despertar del Animal, 2002
- En vivo un medio acústico, 2002
- Forseps IV, 2004
- José Fors Forseps 5 , 2008

=== Others ===
- Frankenstein: The Rock Opera, 2009
- Orlok: The Rock Opera, 2012

=== Connected ===
- Culebra 1996, 1996 (Cuca: 'La Balada' and 'Toma')
- Red Hot + Latin: Silencio = Muerte, 1997 ('El son del dolor' featuring Youth Brigade)
- Operación Código Rojo, 2004 ('Señalado y apartado' and 'Todos somos portadores')
- Tokin Records Kompilado.2os, 2004 ('Dulce Violencia')
- Hellboy Soundtrack, 2004 ('Hellboy')
- La Otra Navidad, 2005 ('Mi regalo de navidad' and 'Otra navidad')
