= Sound & Fury (1983 Youth Brigade album) =

Studio album by Youth Brigade
- Released: June 1983
- Recorded: March–April 1983 at Perspective Sound, Sun Valley, California
- Genre: Hardcore punk; pop-punk
- Length: 37:29
- Label: BYO Records
- Producer: Thom Wilson

Youth Brigade chronology
Sound & Fury (1982)	Sound & Fury (1983)	The Dividing Line (1986)

Sound & Fury is the second studio album released by Los Angeles-based hardcore punk band Youth Brigade. Released in 1983, it followed a 1982 album of the same name.

The album was released on CD as the first half of the 1994 compilation, Sink With Kalifornija.

== Origins and recording ==
In July 1982, Youth Brigade recorded their debut album entitled Sound & Fury Mixed by Ira Malek. However, during the Someone Got Their Head Kicked In tour with Social Distortion (as chronicled in the documentary Another State of Mind) in the summer of 1982, which marked their first national tour, Youth Brigade realized that they were disappointed with the album and stopped the pressing at only 800 copies.

After the end of the Someone Got Their Head Kicked In tour, the band returned home and decided to record a new album entitled Sound & Fury, keeping only four tracks from the original ("Fight to Unite", "The Circle", "You Don't Understand", "Sound & Fury"). Recording sessions for the second version began in March 1983 at Perspective Sound, Sun Valley, California, with Thom Wilson producing. The sessions lasted a month, concluding in April.

== Critical reception ==
Professional ratings
Review scores
Source	Rating
AllMusic	3/5 stars
Sounds	4/5 stars

In a retrospective review, AllMusic writer Victor W. Valdivia claimed that Sound & Fury does a "much better job, proving that Youth Brigade has enough musical talent to justify their prominence" and described the members of Youth Brigade "a superb ensemble who can construct nicely energetic pop-punk anthems." Valdivia also described "Sink With California" (the first track on the re-release) and "Fight to Unite" "hopeful anthems of unity and action that are neither nihilistic nor simpleminded, as too many other punk songs of the era are, and are backed with hard-driving punk to boot", while he also called "Men in Blue" the "standard anti-police rant". The album received a rating of three out of five stars.

== Track listing ==
All tracks were written by Youth Brigade, except where noted.

=== Side one ===
1. "Sink with California"
2. "Modest Proposal"
3. "Men in Blue (Part I)"
4. "Sound & Fury"
5. "Fight to Unite"
6. "Jump Back"
7. "Blown Away"

=== Side two ===
1. "Live Life"
2. "What Are You Fighting For"
3. "Did You Wanna Die"
4. "You Don't Understand"
5. "The Circle"
6. "Duke of Earl" (Williams, Edwards, Dixon)
7. "What Will the Revolution Change"

== Personnel ==
- Shawn Stern − guitars, vocals
- Adam Stern − bass, vocals
- Mark Stern − drums, vocals
