= Galo Ochoa =

Mexican guitarist (born 1967)

- Born: Oscar Galileo Ochoa soto Los Angeles, California, United States
- Genres: Hard rock, Heavy metal
- Occupations: Musician, Songwriter, Producer
- Instruments: Guitar, vocals.
- Years active: 1990–present
- Labels: Culebra Records, BMG, Universal Music Group

Galo Ochoa was born in 1967 in Los Angeles, California, is the guitarist for the bands Cuca and Nata.

== Cuca ==
His career began with this band and for which he is most known. Its characteristic sound is mainly hard rock. Cuca's most popular songs are "El Son del Dolor", "La Pucha Asesina", "La Balada".

== Nata ==
After the breakup of Cuca (1999), Galo, his brother Aldo, Christian Gómez and Carlos Aviléz Gómez (also bassist for Cuca) formed Nata, whose sound is rather close to heavy metal.

=== With Cuca ===
- La Invasión de los Blátidos, 1992
- Tu Cuca Madre Ataca de Nuevo, 1993
- La Racha, 1995
- El Cuarto de Cuca, 1997
- Viva Cuca, 2004
- Con Pelotas}, 2006

=== With Nata ===
- Nata, 2002
- Krudo, 2007
- CHOKE, 2013
