= Another State of Mind =

Another State of Mind may refer to:

- Another State of Mind (film), a documentary featuring three punk rock bands
- "Another State of Mind" (song), by Social Distortion, from Mommy's Little Monster
