= Happy Hour (Youth Brigade album) =

Studio album by Youth Brigade
- Released: September 27, 1994
- Recorded: January 1994 at Westbeach Recorders, Hollywood, California (except track 11, March 1993)
- Genre: Hardcore punk
- Label: BYO Records

Youth Brigade chronology
The Dividing Line (1986)	Happy Hour (1994)	Sink With Kalifornija (1994)

Happy Hour is a studio album by the Los Angeles–based hardcore punk band Youth Brigade, released in 1994. It was the band's first full-length studio album since their second album Sound & Fury, released 11 years earlier. However, in the 11 years they had released two EPs, as well as one album under the name The Brigade, when bassist/vocalist Adam Stern was on hiatus from the band for six years, from 1985 to 1991. The band supported the album with the "10 Years of BYO in Yer Face" tour.

== Critical reception ==
Professional ratings
Review scores
Source	Rating
AllMusic	2/5 stars

AllMusic wrote that "the songs are speedy and socially conscious as usual, with that Southern California hardcore feel."

== Track listing ==
1. "All Style, No Substance" (Shawn Stern, Adam Stern) (2:24)
2. "Better Without You" (Shawn Stern, Mark Stern) (4:03)
3. "Punk Rock Mom" (Youth Brigade) (2:07)
4. "Guns Are For..." (Shawn Stern, Adam Stern) (2:03)
5. "Let Me Be" (Youth Brigade) (2:38)
6. "It's Not Enough" (Shawn Stern) (2:36)
7. "Alive By Machine" (Shawn Stern, Adam Stern) (2:45)
8. "It Just Doesn't Matter" (Shawn Stern, Mark Stern) (2:29)
9. "Wanted" (Shawn Stern) (3:21)
10. "Volare" (Domenico Modugno, Mitchell Parish) (2:02)
11. "Sad But True" (Shawn Stern, Mark Stern) (3:35)
12. "This Is a Life" (Shawn Stern, Adam Stern) (2:31)
13. "Deep Inside of Me" (Shawn Stern, Mark Stern) (2:05)

== Personnel ==
- Shawn Stern − guitars, vocals
- Adam Stern − bass, vocals
- Mark Stern − drums, vocals
