= The Dividing Line =

The Dividing Line may refer to:

- The Dividing Line (Youth Brigade album)
- The Dividing Line (SSS album)
- Alternative title for the 1950 American film The Lawless
- "The Dividing Line" (song), by Genesis on the 1997 album Calling All Stations

== See also ==
- Dividing Lines, an album by the progressive metal band Threshold released in 2022
