= Easy Prey =

1986 historical drama made-for-TV film

- DVD cover
- Genre: Drama
- Written by: John Carlen
- Directed by: Sandor Stern
- Starring: Gerald McRaney; Susan Hogan; Shawnee Smith; Barry Flatman; Kate Lynch
- Music by: J.A.C. Redford
- Country of origin: Canada
- Original language: English

Production
- Executive producers: Allan F. Bodoh; Lawrence Mortorff
- Producers: Gary M. Goodman; René Malo; Barry Rosen
- Production locations: Toronto, Ontario, Canada
- Cinematography: Reginald H. Morris
- Running time: 2 hours
- Production company: Brayton-Carlucci Productions

Original release
- Network: LMN; ABC
- Release: October 26, 1986

Easy Prey is a 1986 Canadian-American historical drama made-for-television film, reenacting the true story of Australian-American serial killer Christopher Wilder, also known as "the Beauty Queen Killer", and his kidnapping of victim Tina Marie Risico, a sixteen-year-old girl.

== Plot ==
Tina Marie Risico, a pretty teenage girl with low self-esteem, is spending time at the shopping mall when she is approached by a man claiming to be a photographer looking for new models. Tina follows the man to his van in the parking lot, where she is abducted, raped and taken away. The man, Christopher Wilder, keeps Tina for a cross-country road trip, with the constant threat that he plans to kill her when he gets bored of her. After a long time staying in motels and driving, Christopher and Tina form an awkward bond. At one point, Christopher has a moment of empathy for the girl when she breaks down crying, and he allows her to eat at a dine-in restaurant with him rather than waiting in the van.

Tina develops Stockholm syndrome and proceeds to stay at Christopher's side despite his acts of abuse towards her. She discovers that Christopher is killing other women and girls, and she reluctantly aids the man in luring another underage girl from a shopping mall, the same way Tina herself was abducted. Eventually, Christopher decides to let Tina go, buying her an airplane ticket home and kissing her. Tina has conflicting feelings about Christopher, traumatized by the abuse and the kidnapping, while also missing him deeply, which confuses her family when she's finally able to return to them. Meanwhile, after a violent altercation with the police, Christopher is shot and killed in a gas station parking lot.

== Cast ==
- Gerald McRaney as Christopher Wilder
- Shawnee Smith as Tina Marie Risico
- Susan Hogan as Carol Risico
- Kate Lynch as Fran Altman
- Barry Flatman as Wells
- Jessica Steen as Wendy Robinson
- Laurie Paton as Angela
- Jeremy Ratchford as Billy
- Jennifer Irwin as Jenny

== Production ==
Easy Prey was made mostly in central Canada, although the story itself is set across a more than 3,000 miles (4,800 km) stretch of the United States.

The new wave band The Brigade had a song featured in the film during a prominent scene, "It's A Wonderful Life" from The Brigade's album The Dividing Line. Larry Mortiff and Alan Bodoh, two independent producers, made a deal with survivor Tina Marie Risico to create a dramatized film of her experiences with Wilder. The two producers shot Easy Prey on a $2.5 million budget in the Canadian city of Toronto, hoping to save money by not filming directly in the United States. The film was eventually picked up by ABC for release.

== Reception ==
Easy Prey was aired sporadically as an ABC Movie of the Week and a film on the Lifetime Movie Network, while bootleg copies appear on YouTube. The film was praised largely for its cast's acting; John Ferguson of Radio Times said of main actor Gerald McRaney, "Gerald McRaney is usually associated with likeable Texans, but here he is surprisingly effective as a serial killer preying on young innocents." Bill Kelley of Florida's Sun Sentenial pointed out the cautionary tale value of the film, noting that Easy Prey is a "social commentary and a warning to young women not to go off with strangers. (Most of Wilder's victims, including Risico, allegedly were lured into his car with promises of a photo session. When they arrived at an isolated site, police say Wilder raped and murdered them.)"
