= Theresa Ferguson =

- Born: October 8, 1962
- Disappeared: March 18, 1984 (aged 21); Merritt Island, Florida, U.S.
- Cause of death: Strangulation
- Body discovered: March 23, 1984; Canaveral Groves, Florida

Teresa Ann "Terry" Ferguson (October 8, 1962 – March 18, 1984) was an aspiring model. On March 18, 1984, she was lured away from the Merritt Square Mall in Merritt Island, Florida, by serial killer Christopher Wilder, also known as the Beauty Queen Killer and the Snapshot Killer. He murdered Ferguson and dumped her body at Canaveral Groves, where it was discovered on March 23, 1984.

== Media ==
Ferguson is the subject of the premiere episode of the podcast Catching Evil as the first confirmed victim of Christopher Wilder.

Frances Ferguson, Terry's mother, wrote a book about her daughter entitled Wake Me up at 10:00 Love, Terry. The title is based on the final note written to her by Terry. The book discusses the journey through grief and growth undertaken by Frances following her daughter's death.
