= Christopher Wilder =

Australian-American serial killer and kidnapper (1945–1984)

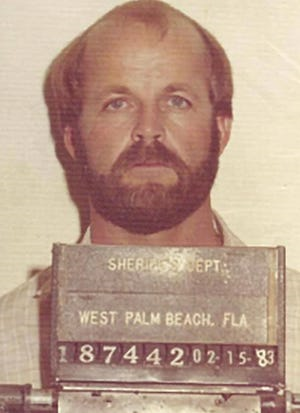
- Wilder in 1983
- Born: Christopher Bernard Wilder; March 13, 1945; Sydney, New South Wales, Australia
- Died: April 13, 1984 (aged 39); Colebrook, New Hampshire, United States
- Cause of death: Gunshot wounds
- Other names: The Beauty Queen Killer; The Snapshot Killer
- Children: 1

Details
- Victims: 8+ murdered 4 kidnapped
- Span of crimes: February 26 – April 13, 1984
- Country: Australia (suspected); United States

Christopher Bernard Wilder (March 13, 1945 – April 13, 1984), also known as the Beauty Queen Killer and the Snapshot Killer, was an Australian-American serial killer who abducted at least twelve young women and girls, killing eight of them during a six-week, cross-country crime spree in the United States in early 1984. Having committed numerous rapes and sexual assaults in Australia and the United States dating back to 1963, Wilder had developed his methods for victimizing attractive young women, most of whom he enticed by promising to take their photographs.

In February 1984, Wilder progressed to murder, beginning in Florida, then traveling more than 6,000 miles (9,700 km) west to California then north and east to New Hampshire, while committing murders, abductions, attempted abductions, and transportation of victims in 16 different states. After subduing his victims, he tortured and raped them before shooting, stabbing, or strangling them to death. He electrocuted two or more of his victims using a makeshift electrical cord.

After being named a suspect in the disappearances of his first two victims, both of whom were women he knew and whose bodies were never found, Wilder began to target random women, many of whom were abducted from shopping malls. During a struggle with police in New Hampshire on April 13, 1984, he accidentally killed himself, with one bullet from his gun passing through his body and seriously injuring the officer trying to disarm him. Since his death, Wilder has been suspected of the rapes, murders, and disappearances of many other women, including the 1965 Wanda Beach Murders in his native city of Sydney, as well as the suspected murder of missing 18-year-old beauty queen Tammy Lynn Leppert. The 1986 made-for-television movie Easy Prey dramatizes Wilder's crimes.

== Early life ==
Christopher Bernard Wilder was born on March 13, 1945, in Sydney, New South Wales, Australia. He was the oldest of four sons to an American father, Coley Chapman Wilder, a naval officer, and an Australian mother, June Wilder (née Decker). Wilder reportedly nearly died at birth and reportedly almost drowned in a swimming pool when he was aged two (although this may have been made up by Wilder).

On January 4, 1963, at age 17, Wilder raped a 13-year-old girl in a Freshwater quarry, in the company of two other men, both of whom denied being involved in the assault. Wilder was sentenced to probation. He later said that he had also received electroshock therapy. Bruce Gibney suggested in his 1984 book The Beauty Queen Killer that this therapy aggravated Wilder's violent sexual tendencies. However, journalist Duncan McNab wrote in his 2019 book The Snapshot Killer that there was no evidence that Wilder had undergone electroshock therapy, and that the story of his near-drowning was invented by Wilder.

== Adult life and criminal history ==
Wilder married in 1968, but his wife, Christine, left him when Wilder was taken in for questioning over a series of sexual assaults at Manly Beach. After their divorce, Wilder's ex-wife told law enforcement that he had attempted to seduce both his mother-in-law and sister-in-law, and that she had found pictures of young women in their underwear in a briefcase inside his car. She also told police that Wilder had twice attempted to kill her.

In November 1969, Wilder used nude photographs to extort sex from an Australian student nurse; she complained to police, but charges were ultimately dropped when she refused to testify in court. Wilder emigrated to the United States in 1969 and settled in Boynton Beach, Florida, in an upscale waterfront home 25 miles (40 km) south of affluent Palm Beach, becoming successful in the real estate business. He frequently traveled to Hawaii and The Bahamas and also developed an interest in photography, which resulted in his converting a bedroom of his home into a darkroom.

Between 1971 and 1975, Wilder faced a number of charges related to sexual assault. He raped a young woman he had lured into his truck on the pretense of photographing her for a modeling contract. This was to become part of his modus operandi during his later crime spree. Despite several convictions, Wilder was never jailed for any of these offenses. In 1977, a psychologist deemed Wilder a "mentally disordered sex offender" and "not safe except in a structured environment and should be in a resident program" and also noted his need to dominate women and turn them into slaves for his pleasure. He expressed interest in white slavery and spoke of his sexual fantasies, which involved twisting a woman's nipples during sex and slapping and kicking sexual partners.

In 1982, while visiting his parents in Australia, Wilder was charged with sexual offenses against two 15-year-old girls whom he had forced to pose nude after luring them from Manly Beach. His parents posted bail and he was allowed to return to Florida to await trial, but court delays prevented his case from ever being heard, as the eventual initial hearing date of April 1984 came after his death. Two other young girls, aged 10 and 12, later identified Wilder from mugshots as the man who had abducted them in Boynton Beach in 1983 and forced them to perform oral sex on him.

== Crime spree in US ==
=== Florida and Georgia murders ===
The first murder attributed to Wilder was that of 20-year-old Rosario Teresa "Chary" Gonzalez, who was last seen on February 26, 1984, at the Miami Grand Prix, where she was employed as a spokesmodel at a temporary job distributing samples of aspirin for a pharmaceutical company. Witnesses stated that she left the Grand Prix track between noon and 1:00 p.m. with a Caucasian man in his thirties. Her blue 1980 Oldsmobile Cutlass was found parked near Dupont Plaza. Wilder was a race car driver who frequented the Miami Grand Prix racetrack and was also at the race, where he raced in the IMSA GTU class in a Porsche 911.

On March 5, 1984, Wilder's former girlfriend, Miss Florida finalist Elizabeth "Beth" Ann Kenyon, 23, went missing. Beth was a former University of Miami cheerleader and Coral Gables Senior High School special education teacher and cheerleading coach. She dated Wilder for a period of time, and was proposed to by him, but she declined due to their age difference; she is believed to have been last seen with him at a gas station near Miami. Her car was found six days later abandoned at the Miami Airport.

Gonzalez was an aspiring model at the time of her disappearance and had participated in the Miss Florida beauty contest along with Kenyon. Neither woman's remains have ever been found.

On March 18, Wilder led 21-year-old Theresa Anne "Terry" Ferguson away from the Merritt Square Mall in Merritt Island, Florida. He murdered Ferguson and dumped her body at Canaveral Groves, where it was discovered on March 23.

Wilder's next victim was 19-year-old Linda Grober from Florida State University, whom he abducted from the Governor's Square Mall in Tallahassee, Florida, and transported to Bainbridge, Georgia, on March 20, 1984. She had declined his offer to photograph her for a modeling agency, after which he assaulted her in the mall parking lot. Wilder tied Grober's hands, wrapped her in a blanket, and put her in the trunk of his car. Grober was taken to Glen Oaks Motel and was raped. Wilder blinded her with a blow dryer and super glue. He applied copper wires to her feet and passed an electric current through them. When she tried to get away, he beat her, but she escaped and locked herself in the bathroom, where she began pounding on the walls. Wilder fled in his car, taking all of Grober's belongings with him.

=== Texas and Kansas murders ===
On March 21, 1984, Wilder approached Terry Diane Walden, a 23-year-old wife, mother, and nursing student at Lamar University in Beaumont, Texas, about posing as a model. She turned him down, but ran across him again two days later, March 23, and he kidnapped her then. Wilder raped her, stabbed her to death and dumped her body in a canal, where she was found on March 26.

After killing Walden, Wilder fled in her rust-colored 1981 Mercury Cougar. On March 25, Wilder abducted 21-year-old Suzanne Wendy Logan at the Penn Square Mall in Oklahoma City. Wilder took her 180 miles (290 km) north to Newton, Kansas, and checked into room 30 of the Interstate 35 Inn. After breakfast the next morning, he drove to Milford Reservoir, 90 miles (140 km) northeast of Newton near Junction City, Kansas, where he stabbed her to death and dumped her body under a cedar tree.

=== Utah and California murders ===
Wilder took 18-year-old Sheryl Lynn Bonaventura captive in Grand Junction, Colorado, on March 29, 1984. They were seen together at a diner in Silverton, where they told staff they were heading for Las Vegas with a stop in Durango on the way. On March 30, they were seen at the Four Corners Monument, after which Wilder checked into the Page Boy Motel in Page, Arizona. Wilder shot and stabbed Bonaventura to death around March 31 near Kanab Creek in Utah, but her body was not found until May 3.

Wilder killed 17-year-old Michelle Lynn Korfman, an aspiring model, who disappeared from a Seventeen magazine cover model competition at the Meadows Mall in Las Vegas on April 1, 1984. A photograph was taken of Wilder stalking her at the competition. Her body remained undiscovered near a Southern California roadside rest stop until May 11, and was not identified until mid-June via dental X-rays.

=== New York abduction, attack and murder ===
On April 4, 1984, near Torrance, California, Wilder photographed 16-year-old Tina Marie Risico before abducting her and driving her to El Centro, where he assaulted her. Wilder apparently believed that Risico would be of use in helping him get other victims, so he kept her alive and took her with him as he traveled back east through Prescott, Arizona, Joplin, Missouri, and Chicago, Illinois. Tina survived her interaction with Wilder.

In the second week of April, Wilder was placed on the FBI's ten most wanted fugitives list. He and Risico went to Merrillville, Indiana, on April 10, where he abducted 16-year-old Dawnette Sue Wilt at the Southlake Mall. Wilder raped Wilt several times as Risico drove to New York. Near Penn Yan, New York, Wilder took Wilt into the woods and attempted to suffocate her before stabbing her twice and leaving her. Wilt managed to tie a pair of jeans around herself and flag down help. A truck driver, Charlie Laursen, took her to Soldiers and Sailors Hospital in Penn Yan. Wilder had doubled back and returned to the spot where he left her to make sure she was dead. He panicked on seeing she had fled. Following surgery Wilt survived, and she recuperated at Soldiers and Sailors Hospital. She told local police that Wilder was heading for Canada.

At the Eastview Mall in Victor, New York, Wilder forced 33-year-old Beth Elaine Dodge into his car and had Risico follow him in Dodge's Pontiac Firebird. After a short drive, Wilder shot Dodge and dumped her body in a gravel pit. Risico and he then drove the Firebird to Logan Airport in Boston, where he bought her a ticket to Los Angeles. Wilder then headed north, and in Beverly, Massachusetts, he attempted to abduct a woman at gunpoint, but was unsuccessful.

=== Suspected victims ===
- Wilder is one of three suspects in the unsolved Wanda Beach Murders – the murders of 15-year-olds Marianne Schmidt and Christine Sharrock at Wanda Beach, near Sydney, on January 11, 1965 – because of his similarity to a suspect sketch and that two years before the murders, he had been convicted of a gang-rape on a Sydney beach. The day after they were both reported missing by family, both children were found partially buried in the sand. A blow to the back of the head had shattered Sharrock's skull, and she had received fourteen knife wounds. Schmidt had been stabbed six times and had her throat severely cut. Both girls had been raped and their underwear cut, with semen stains on their clothes. The case is currently the oldest under review by the New South Wales unsolved homicide unit.
- Wilhelmina Kruger, a 56-year-old cleaning lady, was murdered at Wollongong's Piccadilly Centre on January 29, 1966. A butcher who had arrived for work at 5:45 a.m. found her bloody body at the bottom of the basement-level staircase. She had been forcibly pulled down the escalators and stairs after being attacked three stories up, possibly around 4:30 a.m. She was discovered naked from the chest down, having been stabbed, strangled, and mutilated. Additionally, the police discovered burns from cigarettes on her clothing and blond hair at the site. Before the murder, Kruger started to feel as though someone was stalking her, so her husband drove her to work. The homicide is still unsolved and is regarded as one of the most notorious in state history.
- A 27-year-old store employee and prostitute from Bondi named Anna Toskayoa Dowlingkoa vanished after leaving the Taxi Club in Kings Cross on February 16, 1966, at midnight. Ten days later, on February 26, at about 5:30 p.m., a truck driver who had stopped at the side of Old Illawarra Road in Menai to fix a tyre discovered her partially clothed, stabbed, strangled, and mutilated body. Drag evidence revealed that Dowlingkoa's body had been moved to a more obvious position three to four days or so before her body was discovered. The majority of Dowlingkoa's clothing and belongings were also missing. Police immediately linked her brutal "Jack the Ripper-like murder" with that of Kruger, and investigators from that crime were called in to assist. They believed that the murder might have been the work of the Wanda Beach Killer, primarily based on circumstantial evidence and similarities in modus operandi.
- An unidentified teen's body was discovered in a field in Caledonia, New York, on November 10, 1979. She had been shot twice, once in the front of the head and once in the back and was the victim of a homicide. She was discovered shortly after her death, but she remained a Jane Doe until 2015 when she was identified as Tammy Jo Alexander, a 16-year-old who had vanished from Brooksville, Florida, in 1979. Alexander may be connected to Wilder because she was discovered wearing an Auto Sports Products jacket, which was a brand Wilder was well known for using. The .38 calibre bullet that killed Alexander was found in the dirt beneath her body and this caliber ammunition was commonly used in .357 calibre revolvers like the one found in Wilder's possession immediately after his death. There is no evidence that the round's compatibility with the pistol was determined through ballistic testing.
- Wilder is a suspect in the unsolved disappearance of 17-year-old Mary Opitz who went missing in Fort Myers, Florida, on January 16, 1981, and was last seen leaving the Edison Mall and heading towards the parking lot. Another girl who physically resembled Opitz, 18-year-old Mary Elizabeth Hare, disappeared on February 11, 1981, from the same parking lot. Hare's body, which had decomposed, was found in June 1981 in a field near Alabama Road and Highway 82 in a remote, undeveloped area of Lehigh Acres, Florida; she had been stabbed in the back and was the victim of a homicide. Authorities began to suspect foul play was involved in Opitz's case following this, but Opitz has never been found.
- Skeletal remains were discovered in a green nylon bag on May 29, 1982, in a shallow grave at the 300 block of F Road, north of Southern Boulevard, in Loxahatchee, Florida, close to property owned by Wilder. Although the manner of her death is unknown, she is believed to have been murdered. Using dental records, the remains were identified as 17-year-old Tina Marie Beebe in July 2013 by the Palm Beach County Sheriff's Office. On January 20, 1981, she told her sister that a man had offered her a job as a model before she disappeared in Fort Myers, Florida.
- The body of Leona Jean Keller, a 37-year-old woman, was discovered on December 19, 1982, by a real estate agent who was inspecting land. Her remains were dispersed throughout thick bush in a wooded location 140 yards north of Okeechobee Road off F Road, close to Loxahatchee. She had been shot once in the head, and was referred to as the "Palm Beach County Jane Doe" until her identification through DNA testing in 2025.
- Shari Lynne Ball, a 20-year-old aspiring model, went missing on June 27, 1983, from Boca Raton, Florida, after telling relatives she was going to pursue a modeling career. Two days later, she called a friend from a truck stop in Ashland, Virginia. Her badly decomposed body was found by a hunter in Shelby, New York, on October 29, 1983, but was not identified until 2014. Her cause of death could not be determined, but foul play was suspected. She was found 38 miles (61 km) from where Alexander was found in Caledonia, New York. A New York State Police Cold Case investigator claimed that Ball's murder was consistent with "Wilder's method of operations."
- Tammy Lynn Leppert, 18, was last seen around 11:30 a.m. on July 6, 1983, in Cocoa Beach, Florida, while in a heated argument with a male companion. Leppert's family filed a $1 million lawsuit against Wilder before his death but dropped the suit afterward. Leppert's mother, modeling agent Linda Curtis, claimed that Wilder and Tammy met on the set of the 1983 comedy film Spring Break in Fort Lauderdale. She further claimed that he travelled to Brevard County where they lived in a fruitless effort to convince her to let him photograph Tammy. She also recalled that a man strongly resembling him visited her modelling agency several times in 1983, looking for models. However, she later stated that she never believed Wilder was involved in Tammy's disappearance. Police were unable to link Wilder to Leppert.
- Wilder has been identified by authorities as a potential suspect in the murder of the Ellery Jane Doe, whose body was found 40 feet from the highway in Ellery, New York on December 6, 1983. Authorities believe the woman was not killed at that location and estimate her time of death as 24–36 hours earlier.
- Lori Jane Kearsey, 23, was found floating in a canal on February 18, 1984, in Davie, Florida. She had been strangled to death and was thought to have been dead two days before being found. On March 7, 1984, Melody Marie Gay, 19, was abducted while working the graveyard shift at an all-night store in Collier County, Florida; her body was pulled from a rural canal three days later. Due to the similarities with Wilder's crimes, their murders were thought to be connected, but he has since been ruled out as a suspect.
- Wilder is the primary suspect in the disappearance of 15-year-old Colleen Emily Orsborn, who went missing after leaving her Daytona Beach home on March 15, 1984. She missed her school bus on the day of her disappearance and is believed to have skipped school to go to the beach. Wilder was staying at a motel in Daytona Beach on that same date. The disappearance of Colleen fit the pattern of Wilder, who often attacked near his birthdate of March 13. Also, one of Orsborn's classmates claimed a man resembling Wilder had offered her $100 to pose for pictures. However, though he checked out on the day Orsborn disappeared, no evidence has been found to connect them. Her body was discovered a few weeks later on April 6, 1984, partially buried near a lake in Orange County, Florida. However, it was initially ruled not to be her and was not formally identified using DNA testing until February 2011, 27 years after her disappearance.

== Death ==
On April 13, 1984, Wilder stopped at Vic's Getty service station in Colebrook, New Hampshire, to ask directions to Canada. (Note: From Colebrook, the nearest port of entry into Canada is the Beecher Falls–East Hereford Border Crossing, approximately a 10-mile (16 km) drive.) Two New Hampshire state troopers, Leo Jellison and Wayne Fortier, approached Wilder, who retreated to his car to arm himself with a Colt Python .357 Magnum revolver. Jellison was able to grab Wilder from behind and in the scuffle, two shots were fired. The first bullet hit Wilder and exited through his back and into Jellison. The second bullet hit Wilder in the chest. Wilder died; Jellison was seriously wounded, but recovered and returned to full duty.

A copy of the novel The Collector by John Fowles, in which a man keeps a woman in his cellar against her will until she dies, was found among Wilder's possessions after his death. Wilder was cremated in Florida, leaving a personal estate worth more than US$7 million (equivalent to $18 million in 2025). In June 1986, a court-appointed arbitrator ruled that the after-tax balance was to be divided among the families of his victims.

== In film ==
The 1986 made-for-television movie Easy Prey dramatizes Wilder's crimes.

== See also ==
- List of serial killers in the United States
- List of serial killers by number of victims
- List of serial rapists
