= Árbol adentro =

Sculpture in Guadalajara, Jalisco, Mexico

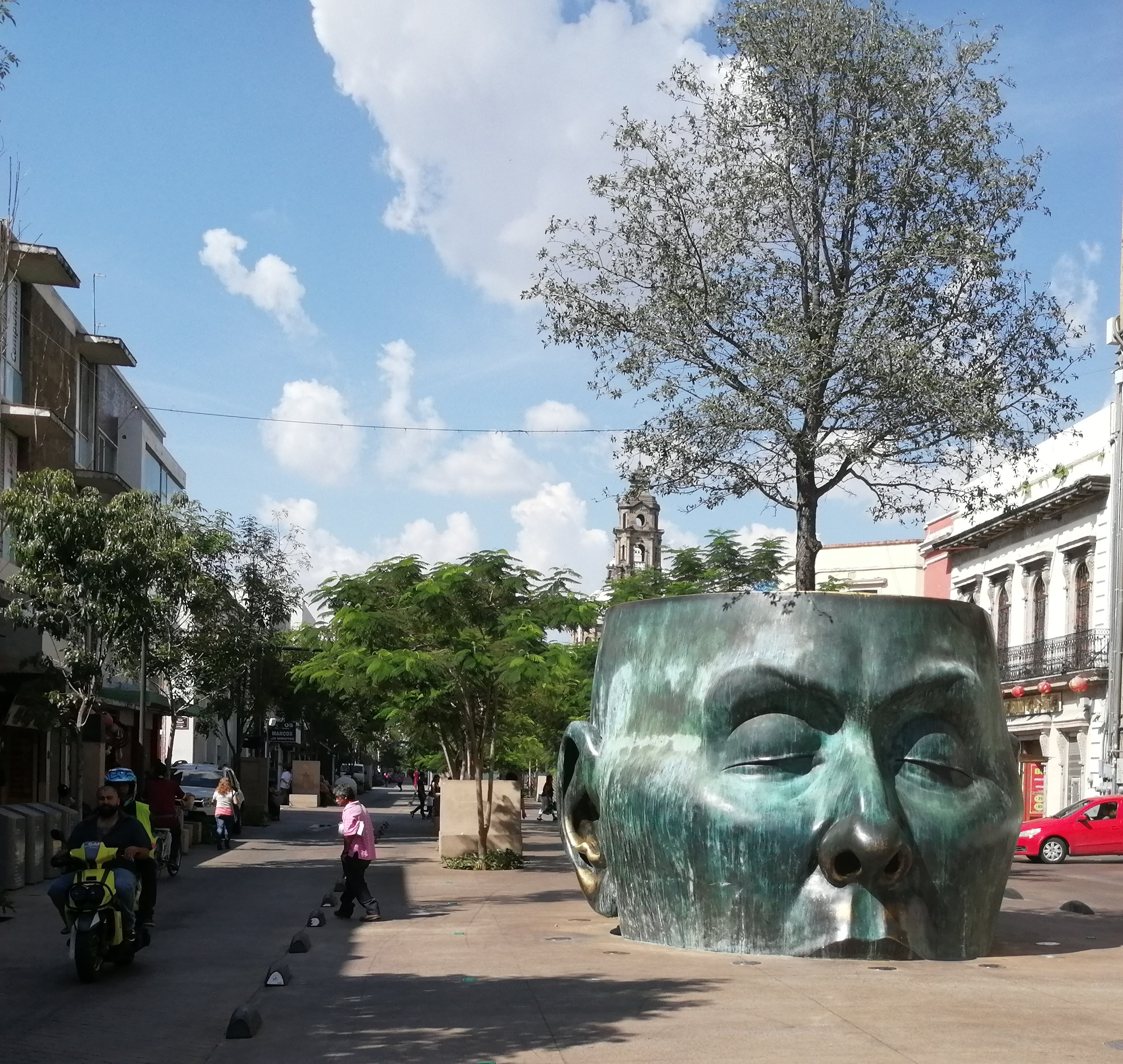
- The sculpture in 2019
- Artist: José Fors
- Year: 2017
- Medium: Bronze
- Dimensions: 4 m (13 ft)
- Weight: approx. 4 t (3.9 long tons; 4.4 short tons) to 8 t (7.9 long tons; 8.8 short tons)
- Location: Guadalajara, Jalisco, Mexico; 20°40′42.3″N 103°20′51.1″W

Árbol adentro (lit. transl. Tree Inside) is an outdoor bronze sculpture by José Fors, who was aided by Gilberto Ortega. It was installed on 15 December 2017 in the historic center of Guadalajara, in the Mexican state of Jalisco.

The sculpture features a cropped human head topped by an oak tree. Costing MX$4.5 million, Árbol adentro initially drew criticism over its expense. It was inspired by the poem "Creció en mi frente un árbol" ("A tree grew on my forehead") by Octavio Paz. Behind, there is also a set of stairs allowing visitors to climb to the top.

== Description and installation ==
Árbol adentro is a bronze sculpture by the musician and artist José Fors. He was aided by Gilberto Ortega, who modeled the sculpture, and a group of technicians worked in the foundry. The poem "Creció en mi frente un árbol" ("A tree grew on my forehead") by Octavio Paz served as inspiration.

It was requested by the then municipal president of Guadalajara, Enrique Alfaro Ramírez, at a cost of MX$4.5 million. Alfaro said it was created "with a vision to repopulate" the city's historic center. The sculpture's cost received criticism, with Alfaro saying that, with time, "it will become an urban landmark". Fors had previously participated in Alfaro's municipal presidential campaign by composing a song for it.

Árbol adentro was unveiled on 15 December 2017. During the event, Paz's poem was read aloud. The sculpture features a bronze head with an oak tree inside. The tree was previously located on a nearby street. Its height is between 4 meters (13 ft) and 5 meters (16 ft), excluding the tree, and weighs between 4 metric tons (3.9 long tons; 4.4 short tons) and 8 metric tons (7.9 long tons; 8.8 short tons). At the rear, a set of stairs allows visitors to climb to the top. Its ears are large enough for children to climb inside.

Despite its initial criticism, it became a landmark in the area.

On 7 May 2024, a suspected homeless person set the sculpture on fire, but no damage was reported.
