= Just a Little Bit (Rosco Gordon song) =

Single by Rosco Gordon
- B-side: "Goin' Home"
- Released: 1959
- Recorded: 1959
- Genre: Blues, R&B
- Length: 2:05
- Label: Vee-Jay
- Songwriter: Disputed

Rosco Gordon singles chronology
"A Fool in Love" (1959)	"Just a Little Bit" (1959)	"Surely I Love You" (1960)

"Just a Little Bit" is an R&B-style blues song recorded by Rosco Gordon in 1959. It was a hit in both the R&B and pop charts. Called "one of the standards of contemporary blues," "Just a Little Bit" has been recorded by various other artists, including Little Milton and Roy Head, who also had record chart successes with the song.

== Background ==
"Just a Little Bit" was developed when Rosco Gordon was touring with West Coast blues artist Jimmy McCracklin. According to Gordon, McCracklin started to write the song and agreed that Gordon could finish it, with both of them sharing the credit. Gordon later presented a demo version to Ralph Bass at King Records, who was reportedly uninterested in the song. Gordon then approached Calvin Carter at Vee-Jay Records, who agreed to record it.

Meanwhile, Federal Records, a King Records subsidiary, released a version of "Just a Little Bit" by R&B singer Tiny Topsy, with songwriting credit given to Ralph Bass and several others unknown to Gordon. The Tiny Topsy song, featuring a pop-style arrangement with background singers and flute, did not reach the record charts.

== Rosco Gordon song ==
Rosco Gordon's "Just a Little Bit" was released in late 1959 and entered the Billboard R&B chart in February 1960. An early review described the song as "a rhymba [rhumba] blues", a reference to Gordon's "slightly shambolic, loping style of piano shuffle called 'Rosco's Rhythm'". The original Vee-Jay single lists Gordon as the songwriter, although some later issues (and versions by other artists) list Bass and others as the writers.

"Just a Little Bit" was Rosco Gordon's fourth (and last) single to enter the R&B chart, where it reached number two during a stay of seventeen weeks in 1960. "Just a Little Bit" also appeared on Billboard's Hot 100 at number 64, making it Gordon's only song to enter the broader chart.

He recorded a second version of the song for the Calla label in 1968, in a soul arrangement.

== Renditions and influence ==
Several musicians have recorded "Just a Little Bit". In 1965, a version by American singer Roy Head reached numbers 39 on the Hot 100 and 18 on the Canadian singles chart. When soul blues artist Little Milton recorded it in 1969, it peaked at number 13 on Billboard's Hot R&B Sides chart and number 97 on the Hot 100.

According to music writer Steve Turner, the opening horn line of the original Rosco Gordon version influenced Paul McCartney during the writing of the 1968 Beatles song "Birthday".
