= Jonny Wickersham =

American musician (born 1967)

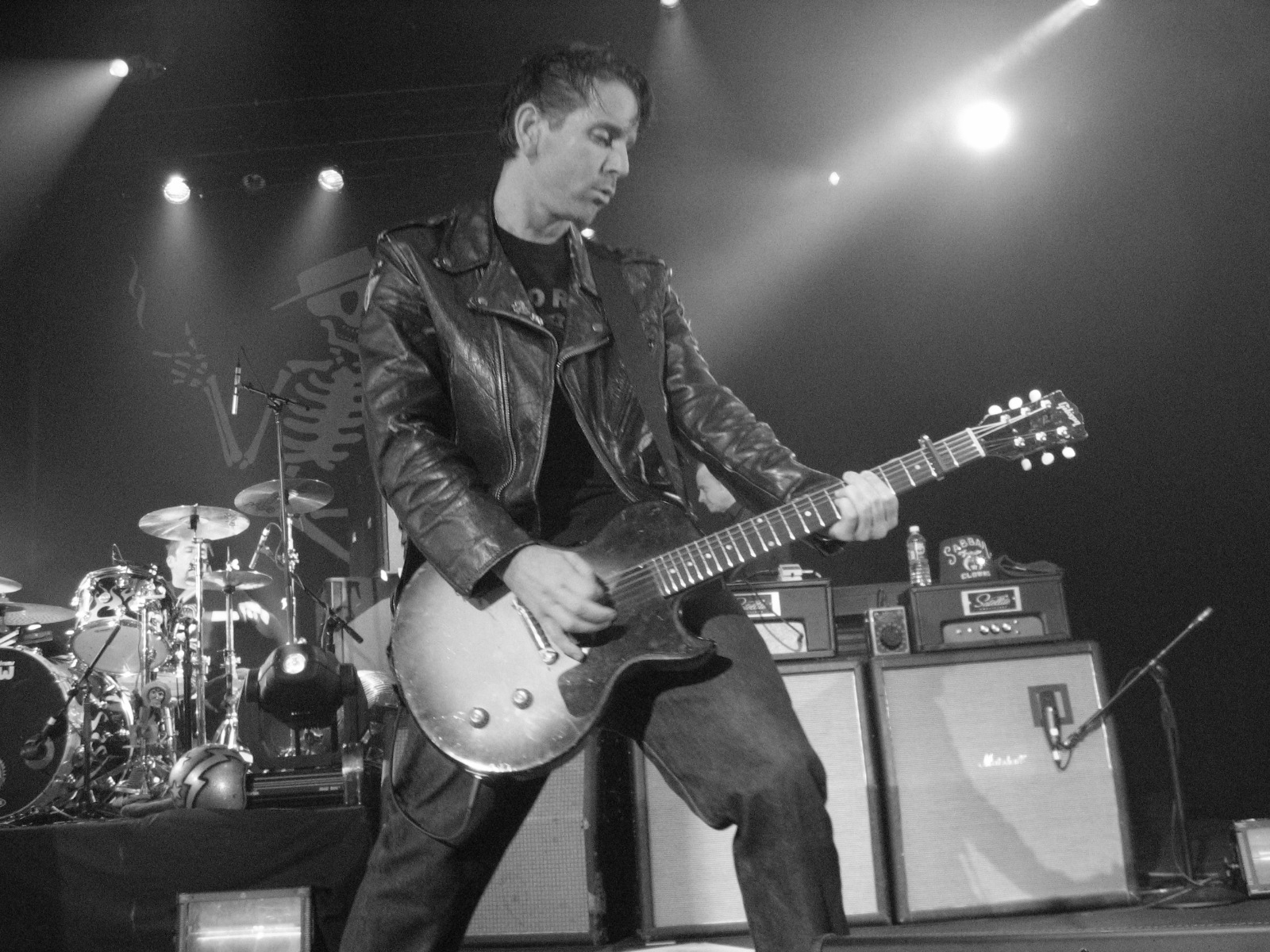
- Jonny Wickersham plays guitar in Social Distortion (New York, the Nokia Theatre, 2005 photo by Erika Harding.)

Background information
- Born: May 26, 1967 (age 59)
- Origin: Costa Mesa, California, US
- Genres: Punk rock, cowpunk, country rock
- Instruments: Guitar, vocals
- Years active: 1983–present
- Labels: Isotone Records; Epitaph Records
- Member of: Social Distortion
- Formerly of: The Cadillac Tramps; Youth Brigade; U.S. Bombs
- Website: www.jonnytwobags.com

Jonny "2 Bags" Wickersham (born May 26, 1967) is an American musician who is currently a guitarist for the California punk rock band Social Distortion. He joined Social Distortion after the death of founding member and longtime friend Dennis Danell in February 2000. Previously he had been a guitarist for U.S. Bombs, The Cadillac Tramps, and Youth Brigade.

== Career ==
Wickersham has been touring and recording with Social Distortion since the When the Angels Sing memorial concert held in June 2000 to benefit Dennis Danell's family. Wickersham also co-wrote "Angel's Wings", "Faithless" and "Nickels and Dimes" along with Mike Ness for Social Distortion's 2004 release Sex, Love and Rock 'n' Roll as well as "Machine Gun Blues", "Far Side of Nowhere" and "Take Care of Yourself" with Ness on Social Distortion's Hard Times and Nursery Rhymes.

In 2008, Wickersham was on tour with Ness's solo band along with Social Distortion.

The Vandals wrote a song about him, "Johnny Twobags", released on their album Live Fast, Diarrhea.

In 2010 he reunited with his U.S. Bombs bandmates to tour with them in Europe and in the USA. That same year, Wickersham appeared on the Swingin' Utters tribute album, Untitled 21: A Juvenile Tribute to Swingin' Utters. He covered the song Pills & Smoke.

In 2012, he announced the release of his first solo 7" called "Hope Dies Hard," and forthcoming solo album Salvation Town.

His limited edition 7" "Hope Dies Hard" was released on December 4, 2012, through Folsom Records. The singles were sold at Social Distortion's House of Blues shows in December 2012. Only 500 copies were made.

His first solo album, Salvation Town, was released through Isotone Records on April 1, 2014. The first single, "One Foot In The Gutter", premiered on Rolling Stone. Wickersham has described the sound on Salvation Town as "Americana," and noted in an interview that "There’s always been a real American roots thread throughout everything I’ve done, with Cadillac Tramps and Social Distortion especially, even to some degree in the Bombs. I’ve always written a lot of ballads and things like that. I grew up around a lot of American music. My father played in bar bands. That’s how he raised me, playing music in bars. So it seemed like a natural approach to me."

== Equipment ==
Wickersham uses an assortment of Gibson guitars and a Fender Telecaster. He has five Les Paul Juniors (a 1955 sunburst, 1957 TV, a double cut 1959 cherry red, and two Gibson VOS Les Paul Juniors with Luther Lee P-90 pickups), a 1954 Gibson Les Paul Goldtop and a '52 Fender Blackguard Telecaster. He also goes acoustic with his 1947 Gibson J-45. He has also used a signature Jonny Two Bags guitar custom-made for him by Echopark Guitars.

Wickersham uses Satellite Atom 36 watt amps through Marshall 1960TV 4x12s with Celestion Vintage 30 speakers. He has been seen using many effects over the years including an Ibanez Tube Screamer, MXR GT-OD, MXR Smart Gate, MXR Micro Amp, J Rockett Archer, and a Boss TU-2 Tuner.

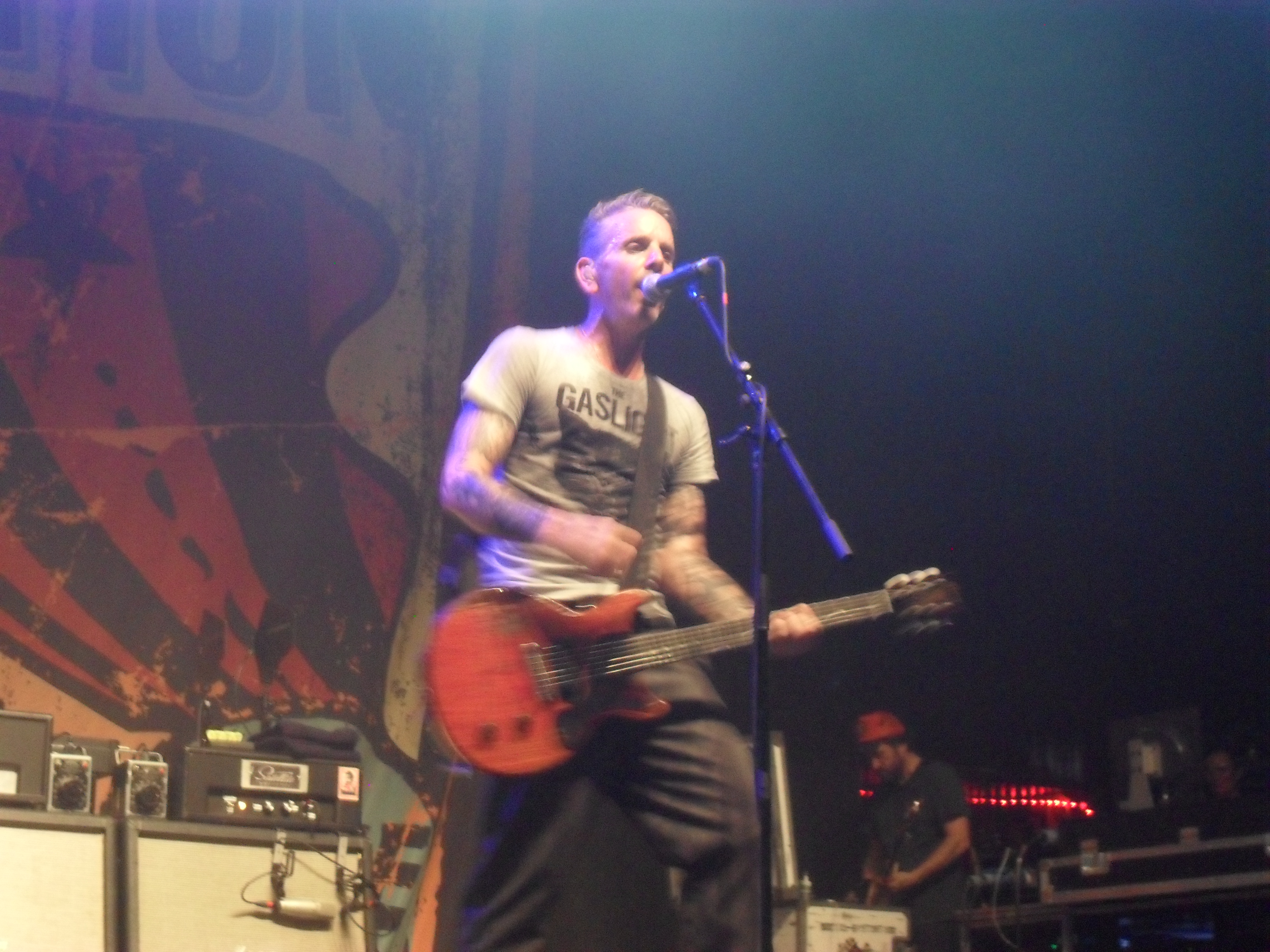
Jonny Wickersham during a Social Distortion concert in Tilburg in 2012

== Selected discography ==
Year	Artist/Band	Album	Role
1993	The Cadillac Tramps	Tombstone Radio	Guitars, Vocals, producer
1994	The Cadillac Tramps	It's Allright	Guitars
1995	The Cadillac Tramps	Cadillac Hearse	Guitars, Vocals
1996	Youth Brigade	To Sell the Truth	Guitar
1999	U.S. Bombs	The World	Guitar, back up vocals
2004	Social Distortion	Sex, Love and Rock 'n' Roll	Guitars, Vocals
2007	Social Distortion	Greatest Hits	Guitars, Vocals
2011	Social Distortion	Hard Times and Nursery Rhymes	Guitars, Vocals
2012	Jonny Two Bags	Hope Dies Hard 7"	Vocals, Guitar, Songwriting, co-Producer
2014	Jonny Two Bags	Salvation Town	Vocals, Guitar, Songwriting, co-Producer
2026	Social Distortion	Born to Kill	Guitars, Vocals
