= Rosario Gonzalez =

Missing person (1963–1984)

Rosario Teresa "Chary" Gonzalez (27 September 1963 – February 1984) was a 20-year-old beauty queen, model and Sunday school teacher who was last seen on Sunday, 26 February 1984, at the Miami Grand Prix IMSA sports car race. Gonzalez was temporarily employed there as a spokesmodel distributing samples of aspirin for a pharmaceutical company. Witnesses stated that she left the Grand Prix track between noon and 1:00 p.m. with a Caucasian man in his thirties with a mustache. Serial killer Christopher Wilder was a freelance photographer and race car driver who was competing in the event that weekend. Rosario had previously modeled for Wilder, having met him at a beauty contest. Police sought Wilder in connection with her disappearance. Her blue 1980 Oldsmobile Cutlass was found parked near Dupont Plaza, but Gonzalez was never seen again and her body has never been recovered.

== Media ==
Gonzalez is the subject of the fourth episode of the podcast Catching Evil as a confirmed victim of Christopher Wilder. Her fiancé at the time of her disappearance and college sweetheart Bill Londos was interviewed for the podcast. They were due to marry 14 weeks after her disappearance.
