= Tammy Lynn Leppert =

American missing teen model and actress

- Tammy Lynn Leppert on a Florida beach
- Born: February 5, 1965; Rockledge, Florida, U.S.
- Disappeared: July 6, 1983 (aged 18); Cocoa Beach, Florida, U.S.
- Status: Missing for 43 years, 4 months and 6 days
- Occupation: Actress; model

Tammy Lynn Leppert (born February 5, 1965 – disappeared July 6, 1983) was an American actress, model, and beauty queen who went missing under mysterious circumstances at the age of 18.

== Early life and career ==
Tammy Lynn Leppert was born in Rockledge, Florida, on February 5, 1965. She began participating in beauty contests when she was four years old, competing in nearly 300 beauty pageants and taking home about 280 crowns. Leppert was employed primarily as a model throughout her adolescent and teenage years, appearing on the cover of CoverGirl magazine in October 1978.

Just before her disappearance, Leppert appeared in the film Scarface (1983) as "the blue bikini girl" who distracts Steven Bauer's character during a doomed drug deal in a notoriously violent and gory scene. Before that, among other minor roles, she played a party girl in Little Darlings (1980) and a participant in a boxing match in Spring Break (1983). Reportedly, Leppert's legs, hips and torso were used in the main poster for the latter movie. It is also claimed she had plans to go to Hollywood in 1983. Leppert had a lead role playing herself in a film called Cover Girl Behind the Scenes.

== Pre-disappearance ==
After the Spring Break shoot was finished, Leppert went unaccompanied to a party one weekend. According to her close friend, Wing Flannagan, she came home from the party "a different person". After performing her role in Scarface, Leppert suddenly returned home after the fourth day of filming. Her mother assumed that Leppert had been afraid of being murdered by someone, and that she had become overtaken by this delusion. Her mother felt obliged to have her examined by a doctor, but after 72 hours in a medical center, Leppert was released and there seemed to be no signs of drug or alcohol use according to doctor statements.

== Disappearance ==
Leppert was last seen in Cocoa Beach, Florida, on July 6, 1983. She was reported to have worn a blue denim shirt decorated with flowers, along with a matching skirt, a gray purse and sandals. Some agencies have stated that Leppert left without shoes or money. A male friend told authorities that he had an argument with her while driving her from her home in Rockledge and had later "left her [...] in a parking lot." Although he is the last person believed to have seen her, he is not considered a suspect. However, Leppert's mother has claimed that her daughter was "afraid" of him.

After Leppert's disappearance, Cocoa Beach Detective Harold Lewis received two telephone calls from a woman claiming that Leppert was still alive. In the first call, the woman said that Leppert would make contact when the time was right. During the second call, she said that Leppert was doing what she always wanted: going to school to become a nurse.

=== Physical information ===
At the time of her disappearance, Leppert was between 5 ft 4 in (1.63 m) and 5 ft 5 in (1.65 m) and weighed between 105 and 115 pounds (48 and 52 kg). She had curly blonde hair and hazel eyes.

== Investigation ==
External image
- Age progression of Leppert to age 60

Christopher Wilder, an Australian-born serial killer linked to the murders of twelve women across the continental United States, was active in Florida at the time of Leppert's disappearance; his modus operandi was to lure women with the promise of photographing them for magazines. Leppert's family sued Wilder but eventually halted the process, as some had doubts as to whether he was involved. Wilder was killed in a shootout with police in 1984. Authorities have not linked Wilder to Leppert's disappearance.

Another person of interest was John Crutchley, a convicted kidnapper and rapist who was suspected of killing as many as thirty women. Crutchley committed suicide in prison in 2002.

Leppert's mother theorized that her daughter could have been murdered due to her knowledge of local drug trafficking. She said Leppert exhibited signs of paranoia, as she was cautious when consuming food and would not drink from open containers. She had also allegedly filed a report to police.

Several age progressions have been created to show what Leppert may have looked like if she were still alive, by forensic artists Danny Sollitti, Diana Trepkov and those from the National Center for Missing & Exploited Children (NCMEC). Profiles detailing the case have been created by the Doe Network, National Missing and Unidentified Persons System (NaMus) and the NCMEC in hopes of generating leads from tips. Leppert's DNA profile has since been processed, but her dental records and fingerprints have not been accessed by local police. It is believed that her dental information had been acquired at some point, but that poor record-keeping resulted in the data being lost.

== In popular media ==
The television program Unsolved Mysteries profiled Leppert's disappearance in the season five premiere in September 1992.

== Filmography ==
Year	Title	Role	Notes
1980	Little Darlings	Party Girl	Uncredited
1983	Spring Break	Boxing Contest Girl	Uncredited
1983	Scarface	Distraction at the Lookout Car	Uncredited

== See also ==
- List of people who disappeared mysteriously (1980s)
