= Sink with Kalifornija =

Compilation album by Youth Brigade
- Released: 1994
- Recorded: 1982–1985
- Genre: Hardcore punk
- Length: 78:14
- Label: BYO Records
- Producer: Thom Wilson

Youth Brigade chronology
| Happy Hour (1994) | Sink with Kalifornija (1994) | To Sell the Truth (1996) |

Sink with Kalifornija is a compilation album by Los Angeles–based hardcore punk band Youth Brigade. It was released in 1994 by the band's own label, BYO Records. It contains recordings from two of the band's earlier works; Sound & Fury (1983) and the EP What Price Happiness? (1984), as well as live tracks recorded at Fender's Ballroom in Long Beach, California in 1985.

The track "Did You Wanna Die" was played on the MTV series Jackass – during which three guys went snowboarding on the streets of San Francisco.

The track "Blown Away" was featured in the action-adventure game Grand Theft Auto V, with the song itself appearing on one of the game's fictional radio stations, Channel X.

== Track listing ==
All lyrics are written by Shawn Stern except where noted; all music is composed by Youth Brigade except where noted.

| No. | Title | Length |
|---|---|---|
| 1. | "Sink with California" (from Sound and Fury, 1983; music by Adam and Shawn Stern) | 4:12 |
| 2. | "Modest Proposal" (from Sound and Fury, 1983) | 1:45 |
| 3. | "Men in Blue (Part 1)" (from Sound and Fury, 1983; music by Mark Stern) | 4:27 |
| 4. | "Sound and Fury" (from Sound and Fury, 1983; music by Adam and Shawn) | 1:55 |
| 5. | "Fight to Unite" (from Sound and Fury, 1983) | 2:18 |
| 6. | "Jump Back" (from Sound and Fury, 1983) | 2:03 |
| 7. | "Blown Away" (from Sound and Fury, 1983) | 2:47 |
| 8. | "Live Life" (from Sound and Fury, 1983) | 2:09 |
| 9. | "What Are You Fighting For" (from Sound and Fury, 1983) | 2:56 |
| 10. | "Did You Wanna Die" (from Sound and Fury, 1983) | 2:39 |
| 11. | "You Don't Understand" (from Sound and Fury, 1983) | 1:49 |
| 12. | "The Circle" (from Sound and Fury, 1983) | 1:41 |
| 13. | "Duke of Earl" (from Sound and Fury, 1983; originally by Gene Chandler, music by E. Edwards, B. Williams, E. Dixon) | 1:57 |
| 14. | "What Will the Revolution Change" (from Sound and Fury, 1983) | 5:05 |
| 15. | "What Price Happiness?" (from What Price Happiness?", 1984) | 3:05 |
| 16. | "Where Are We Going?" (from What Price Happiness?", 1984) | 2:32 |
| 17. | "Who Can You Believe In?" (from What Price Happiness?", 1984) | 4:28 |
| 18. | "On the Edge" (from Sound and Fury (original version), 1982) | 2:40 |
| 19. | "Look in the Mirror" (recorded live at Fender's Ballroom, 1985; music by Kevin Wallace and Shawn) | 2:26 |
| 20. | "Care" (recorded live at Fender's Ballroom, 1985; music by Mark and Shawn) | 3:26 |
| 21. | "Fight to Unite" (recorded live at Fender's Ballroom, 1985) | 1:59 |
| 22. | "Did You Wanna Die" (recorded live at Fender's Ballroom, 1985) | 2:51 |
| 23. | "You Don't Understand" (recorded live at Fender's Ballroom, 1985) | 2:05 |
| 24. | "Jump Back" (recorded live at Fender's Ballroom, 1985) | 4:07 |
| 25. | "Violence" (recorded live at Fender's Ballroom, 1985) | 2:12 |
| 26. | "Men in Blue (Part 1)" (recorded live at Fender's Ballroom, 1985) | 3:53 |
| 27. | "Sink With California" (recorded live at Fender's Ballroom, 1985) | 4:47 |
| Total length: | | 78:14 |

== Personnel ==
- Shawn Stern – vocals, guitar
- Adam Stern – bass
- Mark Stern – drums

== Sources ==
"http://www.byorecords.com/index.php?page=one_band&aid=17&albumid=100057"
