= Bobbie Smith and the Dream Girls =

American vocal group

Bobbie Smith and the Dream Girls were a Detroit-based American girl vocal group during the 1950s and 1960s. They are best known for "Duchess of Earl", which was released in early 1962 as an answer song to Duke of Earl.

The group's original lineup consisted of sisters Bobbie Smith and Sheena Carson, and two of their friends, Kay Green and Tina LaGora. In late 1961, LaGora became pregnant and took a leave of absence from the group. During this time, Louvain Demps of Motown session group The Andantes was hired to perform in LaGora's stead. It was during Demps' brief tenure that "Duchess of Earl" was recorded. After the record's release, LaGora returned to the group and Demps devoted herself full-time to The Andantes, who, by 1962, were quickly establishing themselves as Motown's premiere session group.

== Members ==
- Bobbie Smith – lead vocalist (1959–1963)
- Sheena Carson (1959–1963)
- Kay Green (1959–1963)
- Tina LaGora – soprano (1959–1961, 1962–1963)
- Louvain Demps – soprano (1961–1962)
