= To Sell the Truth =

Studio album by Youth Brigade
- Released: 1996
- Genre: Melodic hardcore
- Label: BYO Records
- Producer: Steve Kravac

Youth Brigade chronology
Sink with Kalifornija (1994)	To Sell the Truth (1996)	Out of Print (1998)

Professional ratings
Review scores
Source	Rating
Allmusic	link

To Sell the Truth is the latest studio album by the Los Angeles–based hardcore punk band Youth Brigade, released in 1996. This was the band's only album so far recorded as a four-piece, adding Jonny "2 Bags" Wickersham as the second guitarist. As of 2026, it is the band's most recent studio album released under the Youth Brigade name, although they did record six new tracks on the 1999 split album BYO Split Series Volume II.

== Track listing ==
1. "It's Not My Fault" (Youth Brigade) – 2:38
2. "Spies for Life" (Youth Brigade) – 2:57
3. "Sick" (Shawn Stern, Mark Stern) – 3:27
4. "We're In!" (Shawn Stern, Jonny Wickersham) – 2:14
5. "Breakdown" (Shawn Stern, Adam Stern) – 2:04
6. "Street Dominator" (Adam Stern) – 1:56
7. "Shrinking" (Shawn Stern) – 2:11
8. "Believe in Something" (Shawn Stern) – 3:55
9. "Friends" (Youth Brigade) – 2:26
10. "Not Gonna Take It" (Shawn Stern, Mark Stern) – 2:25
11. "My Bartender" (Adam Stern) – 1:54
12. "Tomorrow" (Jonny Wickersham) – 1:58
13. "Last Day of the Year" (Shawn Stern) – 1:51
14. "I Hate My Life" (Shawn Stern) – 2:48
15. "What She Said" – 1:45 (The Smiths) (Hidden track)

== Personnel ==
- Shawn Stern − guitars, vocals
- Jonny "2 Bags" Wickersham − guitars, vocals
- Adam Stern − bass, vocals
- Mark Stern − drums, vocals
