= La Racha =

Studio album by Cuca
- Released: May 15, 1995
- Genre: Hard rock, heavy metal
- Label: Culebra Records
- Producer: Robin Black

Cuca chronology
| Tu Cuca Madre Ataca de Nuevo (1993) | La Racha (1995) | Culebra 1996 (1996) |

La Racha is the third album by Mexican hard rock band Cuca, released in 1995. It was recorded in Zurich, Switzerland.

During production, José Fors left the band to dedicate himself to painting. His brother, Alfonso "Animalf" Fors took the vocal duties instead. However, his career with the band would be short, as José would return for the next album, Culebra 1996.

== Track listing ==
| No. | Title | Length |
|---|---|---|
| 1. | "Toma" (Take) |
| 2. | "Tu ya Fuiste" (You Already Were) |
| 3. | "Mala Racha" (Losing Streak) |
| 4. | "Insecticida al Suicida" (Insecticide to the Suicidal) |
| 5. | "Blanco" (White) |
| 6. | "La Balada" (The Ballad) |
| 7. | "Ninfofan" (Nymphofan) |
| 8. | "Nadie te Odia" (Nobody Hates You) |
| 9. | "Mi Cadáver Favorito" (My Favorite Corpse) |
| 10. | "De Bar en Bar" (From Pub to Pub) |
| 11. | "No Me Filosofoques" (Don't Philosuffocate Me) |
| 12. | "Break On Through (To the Other Side)" (The Doors cover) |

== Singles and videos ==
- "Insecticida al Suicida"
