= Duke of Earl =

1962 single by Gene Chandler

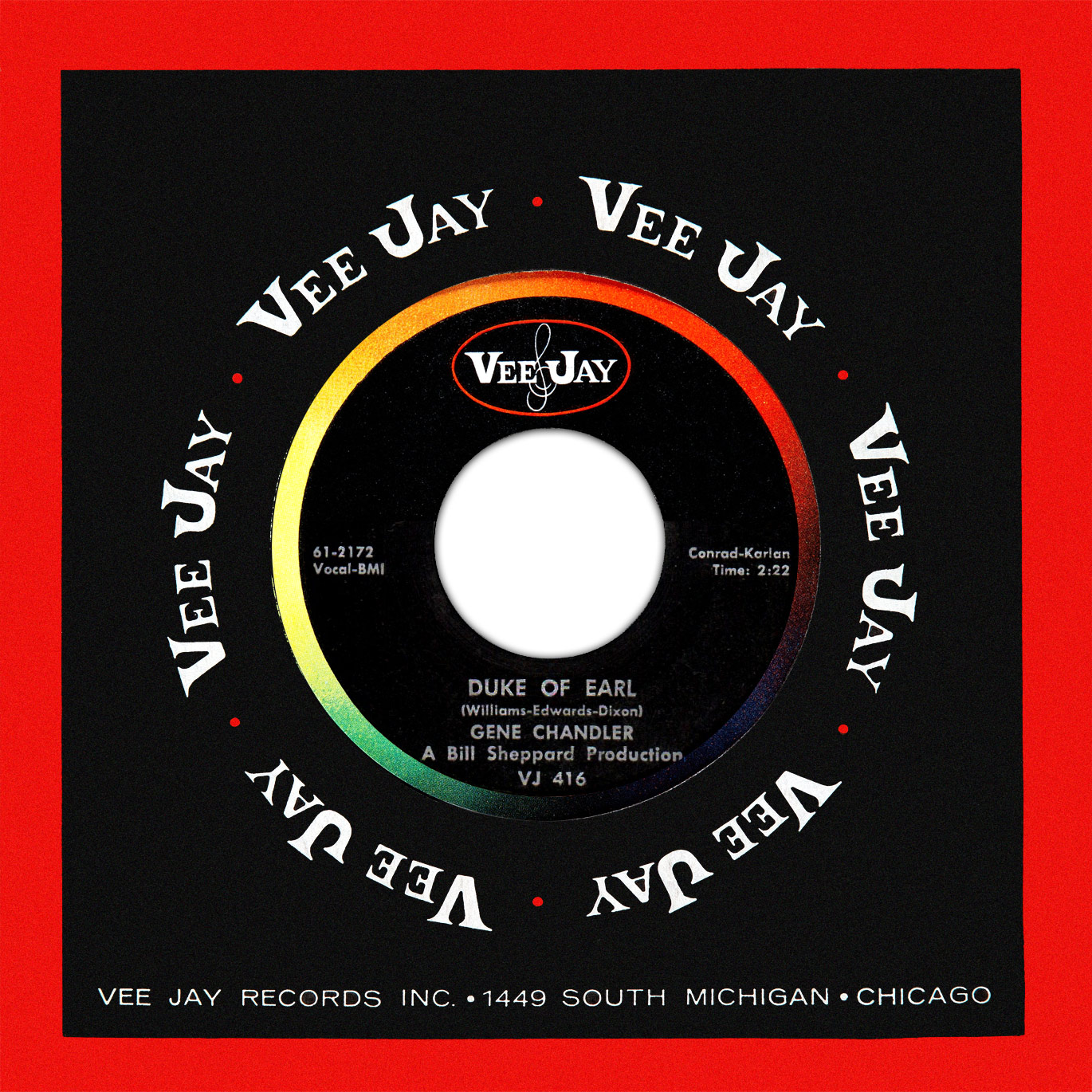

Single by Gene Chandler
- B-side: "Kissin' in the Kitchen"
- Released: November 1961
- Recorded: 1961
- Studio: Universal Recording (Chicago)
- Genre: R&B, doo-wop
- Length: 2:27
- Label: Vee-Jay
- Songwriters: Gene Chandler, Earl Edwards, Bernice Williams
- Producer: Bill Sheppard

Gene Chandler singles chronology
| "Duke of Earl" (1961) | "Walk On with the Duke" (1962) |

Peach colored vinyl
- Limited edition release

"Duke of Earl" is a 1962 US number-one song, originally recorded by Gene Chandler. It is the best known of Chandler's songs, and he subsequently dubbed himself "The Duke of Earl". The song was written by Chandler, Bernice Williams, and Earl Edwards. This song was a 2002 inductee into the Grammy Hall of Fame. It has also been selected by The Rock and Roll Hall of Fame as one of the 500 Songs that Shaped Rock and Roll.

== Original version by Gene Chandler ==
The song originated from warm-up exercises by the Dukays, a vocal group that included Chandler (under his original name, Eugene Dixon) and Earl Edwards and that had already had some success on the R&B chart. The group would regularly warm up by singing "Do do do do..." in different keys. On one occasion, Dixon changed the syllables he was singing to include Earl's name, and the chant gradually became the nonsense words "Du..du..du..Duke of Earl". The pair worked on the song with regular songwriter and mentor Bernice Williams, and then recorded it at Universal Recording Corporation in Chicago with the other members of the Dukays. Musicians on the record included Floyd Morris on piano, Lefty Bates, Phil Upchurch and Kermit Chandler on guitar, Al Duncan on drums, and Cliff Davis and John Board on sax.

However, the Dukays' record label chose instead to release "Nite Owl," offering Dixon the option of releasing "Duke of Earl" as a solo artist. Dixon changed his name to Gene Chandler (a surname taken from that of the actor Jeff Chandler), and the song was released at the end of 1961. "Duke of Earl" debuted on the Billboard Hot 100 chart on January 13, 1962, quickly rising to become number one on both the pop and R&B charts. The song held the number-one spot for three weeks, and was on the Hot 100 for a total of 15 weeks. The song also reached number one in New Zealand on the Lever Hit Parade chart.

== Cover versions ==
The Pearlettes, a girl group, released a cover of the song (as "Duchess of Earl") in 1962, reaching No. 96 on the Billboard chart. In early 1962, an answer song to Chandler's hit, by Bobbie Smith and the Dream Girls, was also titled "Duchess of Earl". Despite having the same title, the two songs have different music and lyrics.

Another cover was recorded by the UK doo-wop outfit Darts in 1979. It reached No. 6 in the UK Singles Chart.

In 1988, an Australian harmony group dubbed 'Dukes of Earlwood featuring Armondo Hurley' reached No. 12 in Australia with their cover of the song. This version's success followed the popularity of a TV commercial for Decoré Shampoo which featured an adaptation of "Duke of Earl" as its jingle.

In 1991, John Goodman recorded a version for the credits to his film, King Ralph.

Frank Black also recorded a cover version of the song, which was featured on a four-song CD released by the Hello CD of the Month Club in November 1993.

Youth Brigade covered the song on their album Sink with Kalifornija.
