= Tiny Topsy =

- Also known as: Otha Lee Moore Hall
- Born: Otha Lee Moore; May 22, 1930; Chicago, Illinois, United States
- Died: August 16, 1964 (aged 34) Chicago, Illinois, United States
- Genres: R&B
- Occupation: Singer
- Instrument: Vocals
- Years active: Mid 1940s–1964
- Labels: Federal, Argo, King Records

Otha Lee Moore (May 22, 1930 – August 16, 1964), better known as Tiny Topsy, was an American R&B singer. The music journalist, Mark Lamarr, noted "Tiny in the same spirit you'd call a bald man curly, Tiny Topsy definitely had the lungpower to match her name." She was five feet tall and weighed 250 pounds.

Although none of her seven single releases made the national charts, her early version of "Just a Little Bit" preceded bigger success for the song. Tiny Topsy was once believed to be an alias used by Bernice Williams (who wrote Tiny Topsy's track, "Western Rock 'N' Roll"), although pop historians now discount the idea.

== Life and career ==
Otha Lee Moore was born in Chicago, the daughter of Annabell and Casey Moore, and was raised in nearby Robbins, Illinois, United States. She began her singing career in the mid-1940s, fronting Al Smith's eight-piece jazz and rhythm and blues band in her home town. Her backing outfit went on to become the house band for labels including Chance, Parrot and Vee-Jay, and turned out over eighty recording sessions between 1952 and 1959, but all of them without Tiny Topsy's involvement.

Her first recording session was on July 9, 1957 in Cincinnati, and resulted in "Aw! Shucks Baby" (Federal Records), incorporating a Ray Felder tenor saxophone solo. Another track recorded was "Miss You So", with the resultant single release billed as by Tiny Topsy and the Five Chances. The B-side, "Miss You So", was a cover version of an earlier hit for Lillian Offitt. The third cut at the session, "A Woman's Intuition", was not issued until 1988. Her next single was "Come On, Come On, Come On" b/w "Ring Around My Finger", when she was again backed by the vocal group the Charms, who this time got credit on the resulting label. Another rock-laden track, "You Shocked Me", was her third release on Federal. Both "Come On, Come On, Come On" and "You Shocked Me" saw a UK release by Parlophone, a rarity for American R&B tracks of the day. Tiny Topsy's fourth Federal single was written by Bernice Williams. "Western Rock 'n' Roll" incorporated small sequences of the then-current hits "Lollipop", "At the Hop", "Get a Job", and "Short Shorts". It opened with gunshots and having been recorded on March 19, 1958, predated the Olympics hit, "Western Movies" by three months. AllMusic mused that sound effects on "Western Movies" were inspired by "Western Rock 'n' Roll". In 1959, she recorded "After Marriage Blues" (also known as "How You Changed") and "Working On Me Baby" which were released on Argo Records.

Her next single, which proved to be her last with Federal, was "Just a Little Bit" (1959). Rosco Gordon had a number 2 US Billboard R&B chart hit with his version in 1960. An alternate recording of "Aw! Shucks Baby" with "Everybody Needs Some Loving" on the B-side was released by King Records in 1963, months prior to her death.

She had married Samuel Hall, a Chicago night club owner, and was therefore sometimes known as Otha Lee Moore Hall.

Tiny Topsy died on August 16, 1964, in Cook County Hospital in Chicago, at the age of 34 of an intracerebral hemorrhage, following an evening of performing at her husband's club. She was buried at Burr Oak Cemetery.

In 2016 the Killer Blues Project placed a headstone for her at Burr Oak Cemetery in Alsip, Illinois.

There are several compilation albums available which encompass all of her recorded work, including Aw! Shucks, Baby (1988).

== Singles discography ==
Year	Title	Label
1957	"Aw! Shucks, Baby" / "Miss You So"	Federal Records
1957	"Come On, Come On, Come On" / "Ring Around My Finger"	Federal Records
1958	"You Shocked Me" / "Waterproof Eyes"	Federal Records
1958	"Western Rock 'n' Roll" / "Cha Cha Sue "	Federal Records
1959	"After Marriage Blues" / "Working On Me Baby"	Argo Records
1959	"Just a Little Bit" / "Everybody Needs Some Loving"	Federal Records
1963	"Aw! Shucks Baby" / "Everybody Needs Some Loving"	King Records
