= Sound & Fury (1982 Youth Brigade album) =

1982 album by Youth Brigade

Studio album by Youth Brigade
- Released: 1982
- Recorded: July 1982 at Mystake Studios, Hollywood, California
- Genre: Hardcore punk
- Label: BYO Records

Youth Brigade chronology
Sound & Fury (1982)	Sound & Fury (1983)

Sound & Fury is the first studio album released by American hardcore punk band Youth Brigade. It was released in 1982 and was followed in 1983 by an album of the same name that included re-recorded versions of some tracks. All of the album's tracks except for "Something's Gonna Change" were released on CD as part of the 1998 compilation album Out of Print. The track "Boys in the Brigade" was featured in the background of the crime drama film The Star Chamber (1983).

== Origins and recording ==
Sound & Fury was originally recorded at Mystic Studios in Hollywood, California in July 1982 with engineer Steve Brenner, and mixed by Ira Malek. However, during the Someone Got Their Head Kicked In tour with Social Distortion (as chronicled in the documentary Another State of Mind) in the summer of 1982, which marked their first national tour, Youth Brigade realized that they were disappointed with Sound & Fury and stopped the pressing at only 800 copies, most of which they sold on the tour.

After the end of the Someone Got Their Head Kicked In tour, the band returned home and decided to record a second album titled Sound & Fury, keeping only four tracks from the original version ("Fight to Unite", "The Circle", "You Don't Understand", "Sound & Fury").

== Reception ==
The album has been referred to as "a classic". Michael Hidalgo of The Fresno Bee wrote that it "always will be Youth Brigade's best album".

== Track listing ==
All songs are written by Shawn Stern, except where noted.

=== Side one ===
1. "Fight to Unite"
2. "Treachery"
3. "The Circle"
4. "Boys in the Brigade"
5. "Alienated"
6. "You Don't Understand"

=== Side two ===
1. "Brigade Song"
2. "Full Force" (Adam Stern, Mark Stern)
3. "Sound & Fury" (A. Stern, S. Stern)
4. "Something's Gonna Change" (M. Stern)
5. "Confusion"
6. "Violence"
7. "On the Edge" (A. Stern, S. Stern)

== Out of Print ==
Out of Print

Compilation album by Youth Brigade
- Released: 1998
- Recorded: 1981–1993
- Genre: Punk rock
- Label: BYO Records

Professional ratings
Review scores
Source	Rating
Allmusic	3.5/5 stars

Out of Print is a compilation album by the American punk rock band Youth Brigade. It was released in 1998 and contains a new mix of Youth Brigade's entire Sound & Fury album, done by Blag Dahlia of The Dwarves, minus the track "Something's Gonna Change". It also contains four additional tracks.

=== Track listing ===
1. "Fight to Unite"
2. "Treachery"
3. "The Circle"
4. "Boys in the Brigade"
5. "Alienated"
6. "You Don't Understand"
7. "Brigade Song"
8. "Full Force"
9. "Sound & Fury"
10. "Confusion"
11. "Violence"
12. "On the Edge"
13. "I Won't Die For You"
14. "How Can We Live Like This"
15. "Questions"
16. "Somebody's Gonna Get Their Head Kicked In"
- Tracks 1–12 from Sound & Fury, recorded at Mystake Studios (July 1982)
- Track 13 from Youth Brigade's first recorded demo (1981)
- Tracks 14–15 from What Price Happiness? sessions, recorded at Track Record (July 1984)
- Track 16 recorded at West Beach Studios (1993)

== Personnel ==
- Shawn Stern − guitars, vocals
- Adam Stern − bass, vocals
- Mark Stern − drums, vocals
