= Salvation Town =

Studio album by Jonny Wickersham
- Released: April 1, 2014
- Recorded: 2011–2014
- Genre: Americana
- Length: 37:34
- Label: Isotone Records
- Producer: David Kalish

Singles from Salvation Town
- 1. "One Foot In The Gutter" Released: 4 March 2014

Salvation Town is the debut album from Jonny Wickersham, guitarist for punk band Social Distortion. The album was released on April 1, 2014. The producer of the album was Dave Kalish, a long-time friend and collaborator of Jonny's.
