= Another State of Mind (film) =

- Directed by: Adam Small; Peter Stuart
- Written by: Adam Small; Peter Stuart
- Produced by: Adam Small; Peter Stuart
- Starring: Youth Brigade; Social Distortion; Minor Threat
- Music by: Youth Brigade; Social Distortion; Minor Threat
- Distributed by: Time Bomb Recordings
- Release date: 1984
- Running time: 77 minutes
- Country: United States
- Language: English

Another State of Mind is a 1984 American documentary film written, produced, and directed by Adam Small and Peter Stuart, following the punk rock bands Youth Brigade and Social Distortion on their summer 1982 North American tour. They spend several weeks travelling across the United States and Canada, but the tour ends prematurely when the used school bus they are driving breaks down in Washington, D.C. There they spend time with the band Minor Threat, who are also featured.

== Synopsis ==
In the summer of 1982, two southern California punk rock bands — Youth Brigade from Hollywood and Social Distortion from Fullerton — prepare to embark together on their first North American tour, planning to play over 30 shows in 35 days on a meager budget. Youth Brigade consists of brothers Shawn (vocals, guitar), Adam (bass), and Mark Stern (drums), while Social Distortion consists of Mike Ness (vocals, guitar), Dennis Danell (guitar), Brent Liles (bass), Derek O'Brien (drums), and their manager Mark "Monk" Wilson. The tour is financed by the Better Youth Organization, run by Shawn and Mark Stern, who have purchased a used school bus to serve as the touring vehicle. The band members, Wilson, and roadies Mike Brinson, Louis Dufau, and Marlon Whitfield convert the bus' interior to fit all 11 people plus the instruments and gear.

The tour begins on August 18, with its first stop in San Francisco where the bands have to pressure the club owner for their agreed-upon pay and are given rolls of pennies. They continue to Seattle, Calgary, and Winnipeg. By the time they reach Montreal, morale is declining as the bus has mechanical issues, money is running low, and the bands are kicked out of a café by the police. In their third week on the road they reach Chicago, then Detroit, where the bus breaks down. Dufau and Whitfield quit, catching a Greyhound bus back to California. With the bus repaired, the bands push on to New York City in the fourth week of the tour.

Along the way, interviews with the touring party, fans, and fellow musicians including Keith Morris discuss punk philosophies, fashions, social dynamics, local scenes, slam dancing, and stage diving. The dynamic between punk rock and religion is touched on, including a group trying to "save" punks by preaching Christianity to them. Throughout the tour, Ness works on a new song titled "Another State of Mind", which he continues to develop and teaches to his bandmates.

In Washington, D.C. the bus breaks down again. Danell, Liles, and Brinson go to stay with a friend of Brinson's, while the others go to stay at the "Dischord House", home of Dischord Records. They hang out with the band Minor Threat, whose vocalist Ian MacKaye discusses his reasons for joining the punk scene and following a straight edge lifestyle. A Minor Threat performance in Baltimore is featured. After a week in D.C. with the bus still inoperable, Danell, Liles, and O'Brien abandon the tour and head back to California. Left without his band, Ness takes a flight home himself.

Youth Brigade stays through what would have been the tour's final night, and leaves the broken-down bus behind; Adam and Mark Stern fly back to Los Angeles, while Shawn Stern, Wilson, and Brinson make the two-day ride in the back of the film crew's box truck. Once home, Shawn reflects that while the tour was a financial failure, they accomplished their goals by spreading their music and message and meeting like-minded people. The completed Social Distortion recording of "Another State of Mind" plays over the end credits.

== Cast ==
Youth Brigade

- Adam Stern – bass
- Mark Stern – drums
- Shawn Stern – guitar, lead vocals

Social Distortion

- Mike Ness – vocals, lead guitar
- Dennis Danell – rhythm guitar
- Brent Liles (credited as Brent Lyle) – bass
- Derek O'Brien – drums
- Mark "Monk" Wilson – band manager

Road crew

- Mike Brinson
- Louis Dufau
- Marlon Whitfield

== Background ==
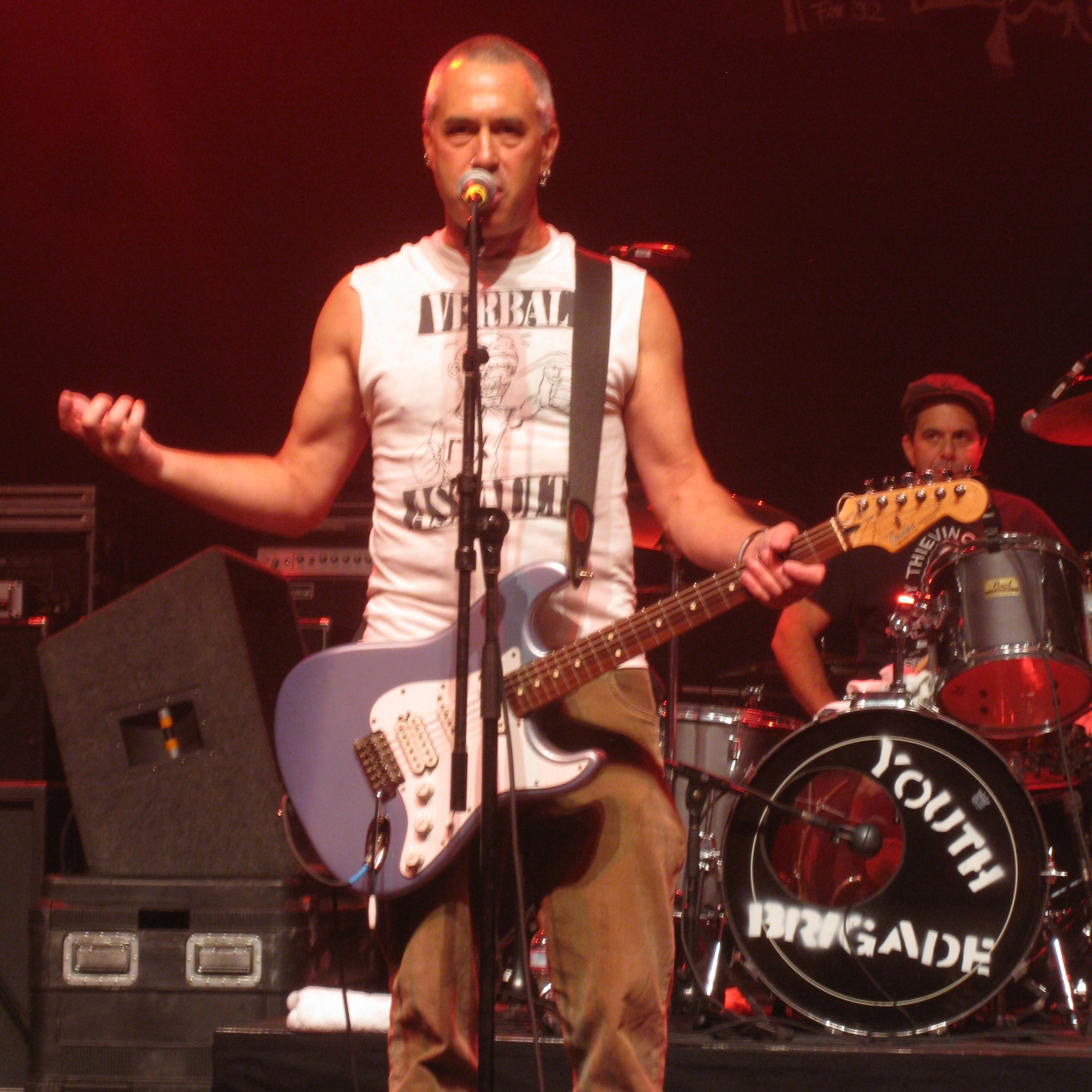
Shawn (center) and Mark Stern (right) of Youth Brigade in 2011.

Shawn and Mark Stern, then in their late teens, started the Better Youth Organization (BYO) in late 1979 as a quasi-collective concert promotion company with the aim of putting on punk rock shows in Los Angeles and spreading humanist ideals within the punk community. The brothers, who had previously played together in a punk band called the Extremes, formed Youth Brigade in the summer of 1980, initially as a six-piece group trying to blend punk and swing music but soon re-tooled as a hardcore punk trio with their younger brother Adam on bass guitar. Meanwhile, in nearby Orange County, Mike Ness had formed Social Distortion in late 1978 in his home town of Fullerton. After some early membership changes, a lineup coalesced to include Dennis Danell, Brent Liles, and Derek O'Brien.

Between December 1981 and February 1982 BYO put on shows at Godzilla's, a former supermarket in Sun Valley which they converted into a concert space. Youth Brigade and Social Distortion both performed there several times, along with many other local and touring punk bands. BYO pulled out of the venue due to conflicts with the building's leaseholder (the club closed less than two months later), but had pocketed enough money to buy a used 30-foot school bus for $1,300, which they intended to use as a touring vehicle. BYO's next event was "Youth Movement '82", a February 1982 concert at the Hollywood Palladium with T.S.O.L., the Adolescents, Wasted Youth, Social Distortion, Youth Brigade, the Blades, and A.K.A. After another successful show by the Angelic Upstarts, Social Distortion, Bad Religion, and the Blades that June at the Florentine Gardens, BYO also became an independent record label, putting out the compilation album Someone Got Their Head Kicked In! featuring Youth Brigade, Agression, Battalion of Saints, the Joneses, Bad Religion, the Blades, the Adolescents, and Social Distortion. "Someone got their head kicked in!" was spray-painted on the side of the school bus in large letters.

Following the compilation's release, Youth Brigade recorded their first album, Sound & Fury, and began planning their first tour. With long-distance calling prohibitively expensive, they had mainly relied on the mail and fanzines to get in touch with bands and fans in different cities. Using an illicit list of telephone card codes distributed by the Youth International Party, they got in touch with record stores, college radio stations, promoters, and others across the country and started booking shows. The planned route of the "Punk Tour Summer 1982" would take them up the West Coast; into the Canadian provinces of British Columbia, Alberta, Saskatchewan, and Manitoba; then through the Midwestern United States; into Ontario and Quebec; southward along the East Coast; then west through the Southern United States, New Mexico, and Arizona, ending back in Los Angeles. They invited Social Distortion, with whom they had been playing shows and gotten along, to join the tour. Battalion of Saints and Agression planned to meet up with them in New York City for a BYO showcase, but this did not materialize.

While planning the tour, Mark Stern was contacted by Peter Stuart, his former bandmate in a group called the Johnny's:

His friend Adam Small had been hired by some millionaire type to videotape him on his private island, and Adam had access to all this video equipment and more importantly video tape which was very expensive at the time. He was able to run a credit line at the video supply store and the receipts were just submitted through the guy's secretary. So they came up with the idea of following us around on the tour and videotaping everything that happened. They rented a big box truck and hired this guy Sean [Maloney] as an assistant. The three of them cruised in the truck following our bus all over North America.

== Filming ==
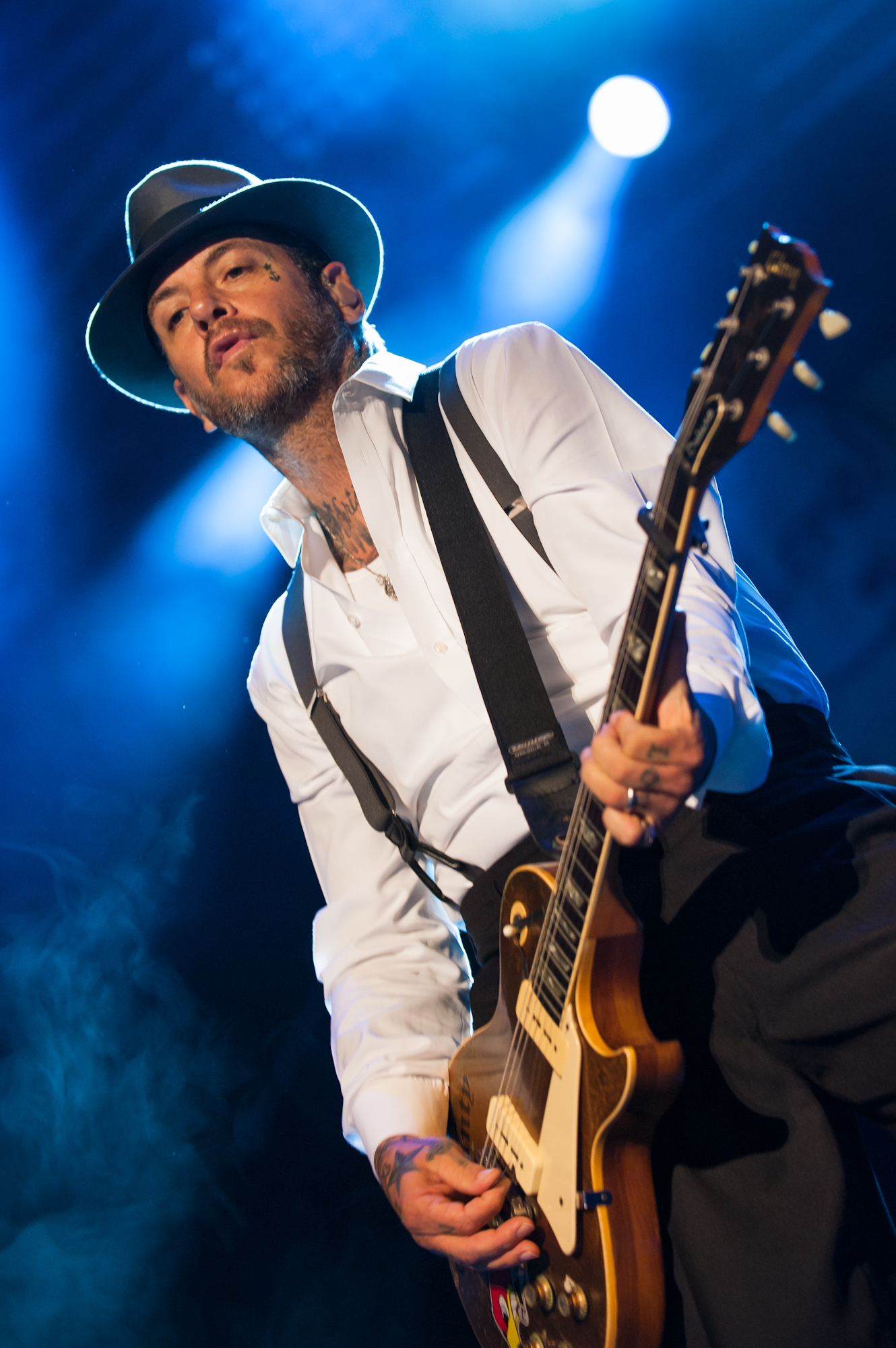
Mike Ness with Social Distortion in 2012.

Another State of Mind was produced, written, and directed by Adam Small and Peter Stuart, with Sean Maloney as their production associate. They filmed the bands converting the bus interior, which included installing benches that folded down into beds, an overhead net to hold luggage, and a loft to stack equipment. The tour's first show, at the On Broadway in San Francisco, was promoted through Maximum Rocknroll and attracted 400 people, but the club owner underpaid the bands, giving them only about $80 total, including several rolls of pennies. The bus began experiencing mechanical problems that night; its main issue was grinding of the timing gear, which eventually led to it breaking down completely.

Mike Ness and Mark Stern drank heavily during the tour. "That was the only thing that kept me going", Ness later reflected, acknowledging his alcoholism during that period. Stern recalled that in New York "Mike Ness got the shit beat out of him — he literally shit his pants. It was at the club 2+2. I mean, of course he was drunk, and he threw a bottle and broke Roger [Miret] of Agnostic Front's kneecap." "The guys who made the movie missed a lot of stuff..." according to Ness; "the huge fight we got into with these Puerto Ricans in Connecticut ... some chicks ... a roadie giving me a black eye, but I really don't remember much. I was in pretty bad shape."

== Release ==
The film had a premiere at the New Beverly Cinema, with two sold-out showings. Tony Reflex of the Adolescents recalled that during the first run he, in a drug-and-alcohol induced haze, pushed over and broke the projector, which was set up in the orchestra pit. He was thrown out of the theater and handcuffed by the police, but Shawn Stern convinced the police to release him, ensured he got home safely, and did not pursue him for damages.

== Reception ==
Writing for AllMovie, Mark Deming described the tour depicted in the film and said "Another State of Mind captures this noble folly on videotape. Along the way, Youth Brigade and Social Distortion play several numbers (complete with subtitles if you can't understand the vocals), the bands visit a punk rock house in Calgary (complete with its own skateboard ramp), they meet up with D.C. punk legends Minor Threat (who also perform onscreen), and end up spending the night at a Christian youth hostel for wayward punks." Music journalist Michael Azerrad, in his 2001 book Our Band Could Be Your Life, called the film an "essential hardcore documentary". Writing in 2009, Mark Stern said that "Another State of Mind became a sort of cult classic in the punk world. It captured a time and a place that was only known to those involved. It opened up the idea that it was possible to do something like that on your own, without the help of the industry and it gave other bands an incentive to take their music and their message and make things happen."

In his 2022 memoir Punk Paradox, Greg Graffin of Bad Religion was critical of the film, which he recalled seeing in 1984 and thinking that "it failed to offer punks much hope for a unified intellectual narrative vision. In fact, as the movie went on, I got more and more disheartened." He felt that it contained too much propaganda for BYO, and noted that although it had interview segments with Keith Morris of the Circle Jerks, it failed to mention his importance to the Los Angeles punk scene and did not even say what band he was in (Morris is credited on-screen simply as "Keith"). Graffin also pointed out a scene showing a packed concert with the Circle Jerks and Bad Religion performing, though neither band is ever mentioned in the film; instead, Youth Brigade's music is dubbed over the footage, "a band that never elicited such enthusiasm nor drew that many punks to their shows. This rendered the entire project a sham piece of propaganda as far as I was concerned."
