= The Dividing Line (Youth Brigade album) =

Studio album by Youth Brigade
- Released: 1986
- Recorded: February–March 1986 at Avatar Studios, Malibu, California
- Genre: Hardcore punk
- Label: BYO Records
- Producer: Russell Jessum

Youth Brigade chronology
Sound & Fury (1983)	The Dividing Line (1986)	Happy Hour (1994)

The Dividing Line is a studio album by the Los Angeles–based hardcore punk band Youth Brigade, released in 1986 under the moniker The Brigade. This would be the band's only release with bassist Bob Gnarly, who replaced Adam Stern in 1985.

The track "It's A Wonderful Life" was featured during a scene in the 1987 ABC made-for-television film Easy Prey.

== Track listing ==
1. "I Scream"
2. "The Struggle Within"
3. "War for Peace"
4. "The Story (Part 1)"
5. "It's a Wonderful Life"
6. "The Dividing Line"
7. "The Last Frontier"
8. "All Alone"
9. "The Hardest Part"

== Personnel ==
- Shawn Stern − guitars, vocals
- Bob Gnarly − bass, vocals
- Mark Stern − drums, vocals
