= Cuca (band) =

Mexican alternative metal band

- Origin: Guadalajara, Mexico
- Genre: Alternative metal
- Years active: 1990–present
- Label: Universal Music
- Members: José Fors; Nacho González; Galileo Ochoa; Carlos Aviles
- Past members: Alfonso Fors(temporary)
- Website: myspace.com/cucaconpelotas

Cuca is a Mexican alternative metal band from Guadalajara, Jalisco that was formed in 1989 by musician and painter José Fors (vocals). Their first official concert, according to the band, was on February 14, 1990. Their first record, La Invasión de los Blátidos (1992), set them apart from any other Mexican band, since the album contained irreverent, humorous, curse-word laden lyrics and an aggressive sound that, at the time, was not expected in Mexican music. "Cuca" is an apocope for cucaracha (cockroach), and blátidos means blattodea, which is the scientific name given to cockroaches.

In 1999, the band split up for unspecified reasons. In March 2004, they reunited for a series of concerts in la Concha Acústica del Parque Agua Azul of Guadalajara which were edited into the DVD titled Viva Cuca.

== Members ==
- José Alberto Fors Ferro – Vocals
- Jesús Ignacio González Sevilla – Drums
- Óscar Galileo Ochoa Soto – Guitar
- Carlos Gilberto Avilez Ortega – Bass

Other Members

- Alfonso Fors Ferro – Vocals

== Discography ==
=== Studio albums ===
- La Invasión de los Blátidos (1992)
- Tu Cuca Madre Ataca de Nuevo (1993)
- La Racha (1995)
- El Cuarto de Cuca (1997)
- Con Pelotas (2006)
- La Venganza de Cucamonga (2015)
- Semen (2017)
- Pornoblattea (2020)

=== Live albums ===
- 2004: Viva Cuca

=== DVDs ===
- 2005: Viva Cuca DVD

=== Compilations ===
- Silencio=Muerte: Red Hot + Latin (1996)
- Rock Millenium (1999)
- La Buena Racha (1999)
- Rock en Español: Lo Mejor de Cuca (2001)
- Este es tu Rock: Cuca (2006)

=== Singles ===
| Title | Year | Peak chart positions | | | Album |
| Title | Year | México singles | Colombia Charts | U.S. Modern Rock | Album |
|---|---|---|---|---|---|
| "Cara de Pizza" | 1992 | 4 | — | — | La Invasión de los Blátidos |
| "El Son del Dolor" | 1992 | 1 | 8 | 23 | La Invasión de los Blátidos |
| "Mujer Cucaracha" | 1993 | 9 | 14 | — | Tu Cuca Madre Ataca de Nuevo |
| "Insecticida al Suicida" | 1995 | 3 | 9 | — | La Racha |
| "Tu Flor" | 1997 | 1 | 7 | 5 | El Cuarto de Cuca |
| "Mátame Antes" | 2006 | 3 | — | — | Con Pelotas |
