= Bernice Williams =

American songwriter

Bernice Williams is an American songwriter and music business manager, who wrote the 1960s song "Duke of Earl" along with Gene Chandler and Earl Edwards. The song was inducted into the Grammy Hall of Fame in 2002 and is in The Rock and Roll Hall of Fame as one of the 500 songs that shaped rock and roll. In the 1960s, she wrote three Billboard Hot 100 hit songs.

== Career ==
Chandler was discovered by Williams. Under her professional guidance, Chandler was introduced to agent Bill Sheppard, and Sheppard found a slot for Chandler as the lead singer with a doo-wop group called the Dukays. Their track, "Night Owl" (also known as "Nite Owl"), was released on Nat Records, and it entered the Billboard Hot 100, peaking at number 73 in February 1962. "Duke of Earl" appeared as a single in November 1961, with a song called "Kissin' In The Kitchen" (also written by Bernice Williams) on the B-side. "Duke of Earl" was a major hit, with one million copies sold by the end of the calendar year; the song topped both the U.S. pop and R&B charts in February 1962.

Williams was also responsible for the discovery of The Starlets, an American girl group from Chicago, Illinois. The group came together in 1961, and auditioned for Williams. She wrote them "Better Tell Him No", which was released on Pam Records that year. The record peaked at number 38 on the Billboard Hot 100.

Tiny Topsy was believed to be an alias used by Williams (who wrote Tiny Topsy's track, "Western Rock 'N' Roll") for some time, although pop historians now discount the idea.
