= El Cuarto de Cuca =

Studio album by Cuca
- Released: May 8, 1997
- Genre: Hard rock/Rock en Español
- Length: 42:47
- Label: Culebra Records
- Producer: Robin Black

Cuca chronology
Culebra 1996 (1996)	El Cuarto de Cuca (1997)	Rock Millenium (1999)

El Cuarto de Cuca is the fourth album by Cuca, a Mexican hard rock group originally from Guadalajara, Jalisco.

In this production Jose Fors returned to the ranks of Cuca together to close the life cycle of the group, which is separated after a series of farewell concerts across Mexico.

== Track listing ==
No.	Title	Writer(s)	Length
1.	"Electroshock"	José Fors	2:32
2.	"Tu Flor" (Your Flower)	Fors; Galo Ochoa	4:20
3.	"Salvame" (Save me)	Fors	3:01
4.	"Bailando Con la Muerte" (Dancing With the Death)	Fors; Carlos Avilez; Ignacio Gonzalez	3:03
5.	"Blanca"	Avilez; Fors; Gonzalez	3:50
6.	"Su Virginidad" (Her Virginity)	Avilez; Fors; Ochoa	3:22
7.	"Responde" (Answer)	Fors; Ochoa	3:55
8.	"Nociva" (Hadardouz)	Avilez; Fors; Gonzalez	3:10
9.	"Mi Cabeza" (My Head)	Avilez; Fors; Ochoa; Gonzalez	3:21
10.	"Amo-odio" (I Love-I Hate)	For	3:31
11.	"Mundo Animal" (Animal World)	Fors; Ochoa	3:04
12.	"Puro Camote"
13.	"Cuando No Tengas Más" (When You Have No More)	Fors; Ochoa	2:53
14.	"Halla-Meya" (Hidden Track)	Avilez; Fors; Ochoa	2:45

== Personnel ==
- Jose Fors – Vocals, Design
- Carlos Avilez – Bass
- Galo Ocha – Guitar
- Ignacio Gonzalez - Drums
- Francisco Aceves – Illustrations
- Cuca – Producer
- Carlos Goméz – Photography
- Oscar Lopez – Producer
- Ricardo Mollo – Producer
- Dave O'Donnell – Mixing
- Ruben Parra – Executive Producer
- John Thomas – Engineer
- Leon Zervos – Mastering

== Singles and videos ==
- Tu Flor
