= Earl Edwards (songwriter) =

American singer-songwriter (1936–2019)

Earl G. Edwards (May 1, 1936 – April 23, 2019) was an American R&B singer and songwriter.

He was born in Memphis, Tennessee as one of thirteen children born to Reuben and Lucille Edwards.

Along with Bernice Williams and Gene Chandler (né Eugene Dixon), he co-wrote the 1962 hit "Duke of Earl". It was originally intended for his group, The Dukays, but Vee-Jay Records, who later bought the song, gave the vocal credit to Chandler.

Edwards died on April 23, 2019, at age 82.
