= Another State of Mind (song) =

Single by Social Distortion

from the album Mommy's Little Monster
- A-side: "Another State of Mind"
- B-side: "Mommy's Little Monster"
- Released: 1983 (original); 1989 (re-release)
- Recorded: December 24, 1982, at The Casbah in Fullerton, California
- Genre: Hardcore punk; punk rock
- Length: 2:38
- Label: 13th Floor Records (original); Triple X Records (1989 reissue)
- Songwriter: Mike Ness
- Producers: Social Distortion, Chaz Ramirez, Thom Wilson

Social Distortion singles chronology
"Justice for All" (1982)	"Another State of Mind" (1983)	"Prison Bound" (1988)

"Another State of Mind" is a song by the American punk rock band Social Distortion. It is the second track on their 1983 debut album Mommy's Little Monster. The song was also released as the band's second single. Both the album and the single were released by the band's own label, 13th Floor Records. The single was rereleased in 1989 on Triple X Records to coincide with the reissue of Mommy's Little Monster. The song also appeared on their 1998 live album Live at the Roxy and 2004 live DVD Live in Orange County, as it had become one of the band's live staples. It also appeared as the opening track on their 2007 Greatest Hits compilation.

== Meaning and composition ==
The song was written about Social Distortion's first North American tour, in which they travelled with Youth Brigade in 1982. The song covers the hardships of touring, including daily travel from city to city, confrontation with the public, the uncertainty of the each day, as well as front man Mike Ness' longing for his girlfriend who remained at home.

== Cover versions ==
Green Day recorded a cover "Another State of Mind" as a bonus track on their 2009 album, 21st Century Breakdown.
