= Silencio=Muerte: Red Hot + Latin =

1997 compilation album

Silencio=Muerte:Red Hot + Latin

Compilation album Charity Album by Red Hot AIDS Benefit Series (Various Artists)
- Released: April 22, 1997
- Genre: Latin
- Length: 74:24
- Label: H.O.L.A Records
- Producers: Tomas Cookman; Andrés Calamaro; Cuca; Sepultura; La Ley; Los Lobos; Los Fabulosos Cadillacs

Red Hot AIDS Benefit Series (Various Artists) chronology
Red Hot + Rio (1996)	Silencio=Muerte:Red Hot + Latin (1997)	Onda Sonora: Red Hot + Lisbon (1998)

Professional ratings
Review scores
Source	Rating
AllMusic	link

Silencio=Muerte: Red Hot + Latin, The tenth entry in the Red Hot Benefit Series of compilation albums, takes a post-modern look at the contemporary rock en Español scene. This compilation features music from Spanish, Pan-American, as well non-Latin/Anglo-American acts that have either transformed the sounds and images of Latin music or have been influenced by the same.

As with other entries in the series, this project tailors its AIDS-awareness message to a specific target. Here, the focus is on the rapidly expanding epidemic of AIDS in Latin America.

Upon its release in 1997, Silencio=Muerte peaked at #14 and #48 on Billboard's Latin pop and Top Latin Albums, respectively.

The album was re-issued by Nacional Records in 2006 as Red Hot + Latin Redux, including new bonus tracks.

== Track listing ==
Original release
No.	Title	Artist(s)	Length
1.	"Pepe and Irene"	Los Lobos and Money Mark	3:33
2.	"Yolanda Nigüas"	Café Tacvba and David Byrne	3:24
3.	"Gente Que No (Are They Not People)"	Todos Tus Muertos and Auténticos Decadentes	4:13
4.	"What's New Pussycat? (Que hay de nuevo, cariño?)"	Los Fabulosos Cadillacs and Fishbone	4:13
5.	"El Son Del Dolor (Tune of Pain)"	Cuca and Youth Brigade	4:03
6.	"Wanna Be Loved (Desea ser Amado)"	Los Pericos and Buju Banton	4:07
7.	"Quien Es Ese Negro (Who Is That Black One)"	Sen Dog, Mellow Man Ace, MC Skeey, Mr. Rico and DJ Rif	4:42
8.	"Padre Nuestro (Our Father)"	Reign and Hurricane G	3:37
9.	"Historia De La Radio (History Of The Radio)"	Juan Perro	4:27
10.	"Quien Quiera Que Seas (Whoever You Are)"	Geggy Tah and King Changó	4:15
11.	"Águas De Março (Waters of March)"	Cibo Matto	3:18
12.	"Una Hoja, Una Raiz (One Leaf, One Root)"	Diego Frenkel (La Portuária), Aterciopelados and Laurie Anderson	4:01
13.	"No Te Miento (I Don't Lie [to you])"	Rubén Blades and Son Miserables	4:29
14.	"Sin Tener A Donde Ir (Nowhere to Go)"	Melissa Etheridge	4:15
15.	"Cosas Que Me Ayudan A Olvidar (Things That Help Me To Forget)"	Andrés Calamaro	3:57
16.	"You Come And Go (Usted Viene Y Va)"	La Ley	5:18
17.	"Venas (Veins)"	Victimas Del Doctor Cerebro	4:15
18.	"War (Guerra)"	Sepultura	4:32

2006 reissue
No.	Title	Artist(s)	Length
1.	"Pepe and Irene"	Los Lobos and Money Mark
2.	"Yolanda Nigüas"	Café Tacvba and David Byrne
3.	"Gente Que No"	Todos Tus Muertos and Auténticos Decadentes
4.	"What's New Pussycat?"	Los Fabulosos Cadillacs and Fishbone
5.	"El Son Del Dolor"	Cuca and Youth Brigade
6.	"Wanna Be Loved (Desea ser Amado)"	Los Pericos and Buju Banton
7.	"Quien Es Ese Negro (Who Is That Black One)"	Sen Dog, Mellow Man Ace, MC Skeey, Mr. Rico and DJ Rif
8.	"Padre Nuestro (Our Father)"	Reign and Hurricane G
9.	"Quien Quiera Que Seas (Whoever You Are)"	Geggy Tah and King Changó
10.	"Águas De Março (Waters of March)"	Cibo Matto
11.	"Una Hoja, Una Raiz (One Leaf, One Root)"	Diego Frenkel (La Portuária), Aterciopelados and Laurie Anderson
12.	"Cosas Que Me Ayudan A Olvidar (Things That Help Me To Forget)"	Andrés Calamaro
13.	"Que Bonita Bailas" (^{[a]})	Nortec Collective
14.	"Peligroso Pop" (^{[a]})	Plastilina Mosh
15.	"Sol Tapado" (^{[a]})	Thievery Corporation
16.	"Sister Twisted" (^{[a]})	Kinky
17.	"Crosseyed And Painless" (^{[a]})	Brazilian Girls

- ^{^{[a]}} Reissue bonus tracks.

== See also ==
- Red Hot Organization
