= Tu Cuca Madre Ataca de Nuevo =

Studio album by Cuca
- Released: February 24, 1993
- Genre: Hard rock/Rock en Español
- Label: Culebra Records
- Producer: Robin Black

Cuca chronology
La Invasión de los Blátidos (1992)	Tu Cuca Madre Ataca de Nuevo (1993)	La Racha (1995)

Tu Cuca Madre Ataca de Nuevo is the second album from Cuca, a Mexican hard rock group originally from Guadalajara, Jalisco, recorded in 1993 in Surrey, England.

== Track listing ==
No.	Title	Length
1.	"D.D.T.T.V"
2.	"Mujer Cucaracha"
3.	"Joder"
4.	"Todo Con Exceso"
5.	"Manuela"
6.	"Hombre de la Marcha (Tus Piernas)"
7.	"Alcohol y Rocanrol"
8.	"Tu Madre"
9.	"Ay Juanito"
10.	"Hambriento"
11.	"Acariciando"
12.	"Así"
13.	"Nicanor"

== Singles and videos ==
- Mujer Cucaracha
