= La Invasión de los Blátidos =

Studio album by Cuca
- Released: November 23, 1992
- Recorded: 1991
- Genre: Hard rock/Rock en Español
- Length: 34:17
- Label: Culebra Records
- Producer: Robin Black

Cuca chronology
| La Invasión de los Blátidos (1992) | Tu Cuca Madre Ataca de Nuevo (1993) |

Singles from La Invasión de los Blátidos
- 1. "Cara de Pizza" Released: January 1992; 2. "El Son del Dolor" Released: March 1992

La Invasión de los Blátidos is the first album by Cuca, a Mexican hard rock group from Guadalajara, Jalisco. It was recorded in 1991.

== Track listing ==
| No. | Title | Length |
|---|---|---|
| 1. | "Cara de Pizza" |
| 2. | "El Son del Dolor" |
| 3. | "El Mamón de la Pistola" |
| 4. | "Hijo del Lechero" |
| 5. | "Don Goyo" |
| 6. | "La Pucha Asesina" |
| 7. | "El Rap de Dar" |
| 8. | "Implacable" |
| 9. | "Que Chingaos" |
| 10. | "Necesito Cirugía" |
| 11. | "Me Vale Madre" |
| 12. | "El Moralizador" |

== Singles and videos ==
- "Cara de Pizza"
- "El Son del Dolor"
