= Canaveral Groves, Florida =

Unincorporated community in Florida, U.S.

Canaveral Groves is an unincorporated community in Brevard County, Florida, United States. It is a rural area between State Road 528 and Port St. John. The community is part of the Palm Bay–Melbourne–Titusville Metropolitan Statistical Area. There is a lower population density in the southwestern region, with a total of 140 households.

Access to Port St. John is on the Grissom Parkway at the eastern boundary. Local zip codes are 32926, 32928 and 32927. North of Suga Avenue, south of State Road 528, and west of Orleans Street is a small undeveloped area.

== Geography ==
Canaveral Groves is located at 28°25′29″N 80°49′13″W (28°25'31 N -80°49'13). The area is 20.3 square miles (30 square kilometers). To the southwest is State Road 520, to the east, is Grissom Parkway, to the north is Port St. John, and to the west is the St. Johns River.

== Infrastructure ==
=== Major Roads ===
- Interstate 95- This road passes through almost 1-mile (1.6 km) through the town It provides access through the rest of Brevard County. Citrus Boulevard goes over Interstate 95 to the western area of Canaveral Groves. It is accessible by the Port St. Johns Parkway exit.
- Canaveral Groves Boulevard-It provides the main entrance to Canaveral Groves and home to the first service in the town. It is 3 miles (4.8 km) long from U.S. Route 1 to Little Court. It provides access to CR 515 and U.S. Route 1, located in Sharpes.
- Citrus Boulevard-This road provides access to the western area of Canaveral Groves. It is 2 miles (3.2 km) long from Hartville Avenue to Osprey Avenue and goes over Interstate 95. Between Lee and Hartville Avenues, the road becomes unpaved for 0.1-mile (0.16 km).
- Pine Street, Coconut Avenue, and Adamson Road-These roads provide access to western Canaveral Groves and Cocoa. It runs north-south, but Coconut Avenue goes east-west. Altogether, they are 6 miles (9.7 km) long, from State Road 524 to a dead end north of Date Palm Street.
- State Road 528- This road cuts through western Canaveral Groves, although it is unnoticed because of the trees along the Beachline Expressway. It goes over Pine Street.
- Satellite Blvd| Satellite Blvd - This road is a rural dirt road on the south side of SR 528, it is about 2 miles (3.2 km) long and allows access to the second service station in Canaveral Groves.
