= Youth Brigade (band) =

American hardcore punk band

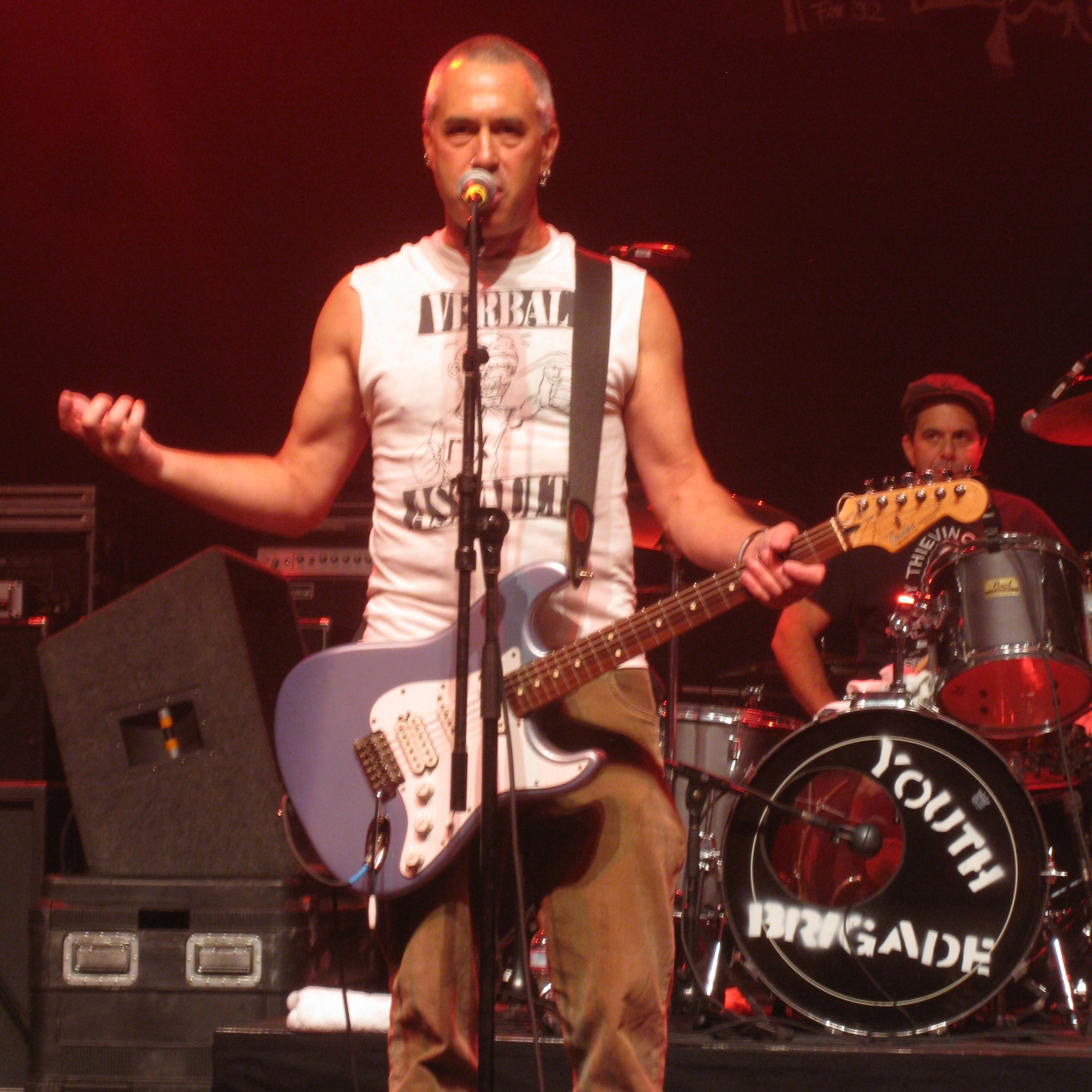
- Brothers Shawn (center) and Mark Stern (right) have been the two consistent members of Youth Brigade since the band's formation.

Background information
- Also known as: The Brigade
- Origin: Hollywood, Los Angeles, California, United States
- Genres: Hardcore punk
- Years active: 1980–1987, 1991–present
- Label: BYO
- Members: Shawn Stern; Mark Stern; Adam Stern; John Carey
- Past members: Greg Louis Gutierrez; Bob Gnarly; Jonny Wickersham; Joey Garibaldi; Mike Carter
- Website: myspace.com/youthbrigadebyo

Youth Brigade is an American hardcore punk band formed in Hollywood, Los Angeles, in 1980 by brothers Mark, Adam, and Shawn Stern. The band then founded BYO (Better Youth Organization). Many later punk bands cite Youth Brigade as an influence, including The Nation of Ulysses and The Briefs.

Youth Brigade have released five studio albums including one released as The Brigade. Four of their five albums feature the band's original lineup, Mark, Adam, and Shawn Stern. Bassist Bob Gnarly replaced Adam for the recording of 1985's The Dividing Line, released as The Brigade. Adam returned in 1991 when the band reunited) and contributed to the band's 1992 EP Come Again and their next two albums Happy Hour and To Sell the Truth before leaving again in 2007. Youth Brigade continue to tour, although other than six tracks on the 1999 album BYO Split Series Volume II, they have not released a full-length studio album since To Sell the Truth in 1996.

== History ==
=== Formation (1979–1981) ===
The Stern family, consisting of older brothers Shawn (guitar and vocals) and Mark (drums) and younger brother Adam (who later played bass), moved from Toronto to Los Angeles in 1970, because their father worked in the film industry. As teenagers, Shawn and Mark were surfers who skipped school to smoke marijuana and attend rock concerts. At 16 and 17, they played in their first band, called Mess, which played Led Zeppelin and Jimi Hendrix covers at parties. A year later in 1978, they discovered punk rock and formed a quirky prog rock/new wave band called The Extremes, releasing a four-song EP on which Shawn sang with a fake English accent.

In the fall of 1979, following a visit by touring British Oi! band Sham 69, the oldest two Stern brothers moved into a large house in Hollywood, near Hollywood High School and christening it "Skinhead Manor." The large punk house became a meeting place which drew participants from as far away as Huntington Beach in Orange County and Oxnard, which is west of Thousand Oaks, California. The house was a nexus for creative energy around a small recording studio onsite. Bands including Circle Jerks used Skinhead Manor as a practice space and residents planned to the launch a pirate radio station.

Skinhead Manor was also a place where people interested in forming punk bands could meet, and where the Sterns briefly created a swing band called the Swinging Skins Brigade, the precursor to Youth Brigade. The Manor spawned No Crisis and other bands. The use of drugs and alcohol were also prevalent in the house with homemade wine made onsite, a Coke machine stocked with beer instead of soda, and drugs like methamphetamine used by some visitors.

Youth Brigade recalled in a 1982 interview:

The manor kind of fell apart because we got too many a_ that didn't give a s_... there wasn't any money to support the ideas. That's the most important thing—you need capital... we split, the landlady wanted us out, too. Then the place was mysteriously burned down.

Godzilla's, a club in a former bowling alley in the Sun Valley section of Los Angeles, became the new hub of activity for the Stern brothers and the venue grew into a mecca for punk rockers from around Southern California. With everyone working at the club, soon a small nest egg of working capital was accumulated, and Better Youth Organization (BYO) was launched in 1982 as an umbrella for the promotion of punk rock shows and the production of music. Shawn and Mark Stern also formed their own label, Better Youth Organization, as part of the project.

Youth Brigade's first year of existence was as a six-piece but they played their first gig as a trio on New Year's Eve 1981 at Godzilla's nightclub. They were part of the big BYO extravaganza "Youth Movement '82" at the Hollywood Palladium, where 3500 people showed up for an all Los Angeles bill in early February.

=== Sound & Fury (1982–1983) ===
In the summer of 1982, after recording three tracks for the first BYO record release Someone Got Their Head Kicked In, Youth Brigade set out in a big yellow school bus on an ambitious 30-city North American tour with fellow hardcore band Social Distortion. The 1984 film, Another State of Mind chronicled the event.

After about 30 shows and several breakdowns they returned home to record their debut LP Sound & Fury with record producer Thom Wilson. A premature version of the LP had rushed together before the tour but pressing was stopped at 800 copies, as the band was not satisfied with the quality of the material or production. After returning home, Youth Brigade decided to record a second version under the same title which kept four tracks from the original version with the rest being newly recorded. That was followed by a 50-date tour of North America during the summer.

=== Final years of original era (1984–1987) ===
After having secured a licensing deal for Sound & Fury in England, plans were made to tour Europe in the fall of 1984. Youth Brigade released the three-song EP What Price? in spring 1984 and then played around 50 dates throughout the Netherlands, Germany, France, Spain, Italy, Yugoslavia, Poland, and Britain as one of the first independent American bands to tour the underground of both Western Europe and Eastern Bloc countries. After the tour, younger brother and band bassist Adam decided to return to art school and finish his degree. The band recorded the last show with Adam in June 1985 at Fenders Ballroom in Long Beach, California and the tracks were released on Italian and French releases as well as in the Sink With Kalifornija CD collection.

Shawn and Mark continued on as "The Brigade" for about two years after Adam left, giving their first interview with the new moniker in April 1986.

=== Royal Crown Revue (1989–1991) ===
In 1989 Mark and Adam with younger brother Jamie Stern, founded the swing band Royal Crown Revue along with three other musicians. Those three Stern brothers left the band in 1991, shortly before the Youth Brigade reunion. Royal Crown Revue continued with new members replacing the departing Stern brothers.

=== Reunion (1991–present) ===
In 1991, Mark and Adam met in a bar in Hamburg, Germany and expressed a desire to reform Youth Brigade for a tour, to which Shawn agreed. When they returned home in January 1992, they began working on new material and performed a show at the Whisky a Go Go in Hollywood. The band recorded six songs in July at Westbeach Studios for their Come Again EP. In the middle of September, Youth Brigade again packed their bags to tour Europe. The tour covered Germany, Sweden, Norway, Denmark, Switzerland, France, Spain, Italy, Czechoslovakia, and Poland.

More than ten years after their debut, the band recorded Happy Hour at Westbeach Studios releasing it in March 1994. Soon afterwards they added former Cadillac Tramps, U.S. Bombs, and current Social Distortion guitarist Jonny "2 Bags" Wickersham and recorded the next full-length album, To Sell the Truth in April 1996.

Produced by Steve Kravac (Less Than Jake, MXPX) and mixed by longtime friend Thom Wilson (Offspring, Bouncing Souls). In 1996, the band contributed to the AIDS benefit album Silencio=Muerte: Red Hot + Latin produced by the Red Hot Organization along with Cuca, a Mexican band. In 1998 the band recorded a 30-second song for the Fat Wreck Chords compilation, Short Music For Short People. The song was recorded in a friend's living room. In mid-1999, they recorded six new tracks for Volume 2 of the BYO Records Split series. The flip side of the album was recorded by Northern Californian punks Swingin Utters. In October 2013, Brian Hanover (Hanover Saints, Union Hearts) replaced Mike Carter on guitar.

In 2015, Old Man Markley members Joey "Balls" Garibaldi, joined the band on bass and later the guitarist Johnny "Fingers" Carey. The band toured Europe and the U.S. before Joey decided to leave and brother Adam Stern got back in the band. Youth Brigade plays every once in a while doing regional tours and festivals, in between Shawn and Mark Stern run Punk Rock Bowling and Music Festival in Las Vegas every Memorial Day weekend (now in its 25th year).

== Members ==
Youth Brigade Incarnations
(1980–1981)	Shawn Stern – vocals, guitar; Greg Louis Gutierrez – guitar, vocals; Adam Stern – bass; Mark Stern – drums
(1981–1985) (Classic lineup)	Shawn Stern – vocals, guitar; Adam Stern – bass; Mark Stern – drums
(1985–1987) (as The Brigade)	Shawn Stern – vocals, guitar; Bob Gnarly – bass; Mark Stern – drums
(1987–1991)	Band on hiatus
(1991–1994)	Shawn Stern – vocals, guitar; Adam Stern – bass; Mark Stern – drums
(1994–2000)	Shawn Stern – vocals, guitar; Jonny "2 Bags" Wickersham – guitar; Adam Stern – bass; Mark Stern – drums
(2000–2007)	Shawn Stern – vocals, guitar; Adam Stern – bass; Mark Stern – drums
(2007–2009)	Shawn Stern – vocals, guitar; Joey "Balls" Garibaldi – bass; John Carey – guitar, vocals; Mark Stern – drums
(2009–2013)	Shawn Stern – vocals, guitar; Mike Carter – bass, vocals; Mike Hale – guitar; Mark Stern – drums
(2013–present)	Shawn Stern – vocals, guitar; John Carey – guitar, vocals; Adam Stern – bass; Mark Stern – drums

== Discography ==
=== Studio albums ===
- Sound & Fury (1982)
- Sound & Fury (1983)
- The Dividing Line (1986) (as The Brigade)
- Happy Hour (1994)
- To Sell the Truth (1996)

=== EPs and singles ===
- What Price Happiness? (1984)
- Come Together (1986) (as The Brigade)
- Come Again (EP)|Come Again (1992)
- All Style No Substance (1994)

=== Split releases ===
- Epitaph / Care (by Vicious Circle / Youth Brigade) (April 1986) – Reactor Records (REACTOR 009)
- Youth Brigade/Screw 32 (1995)
- BYO Split Series Volume II (1999)

=== Compilation albums ===
- Sink With Kalifornija (1994)
- Out of Print (1998)
- A Best of Youth Brigade (2002)

=== Compilation appearances ===
- Someone Got Their Head Kicked In! (1982)
- Something To Believe In (1984)
- Someone's Gonna Get Their Head To Believe In Something (1994)
- Silencio=Muerte: Red Hot + Latin (1996)
- How To Start A Fight (1996)
- The World Still Won't Listen - A Tribute To The Smiths (1996)
- Sample This! (1997)
- Dropping Food on Their Heads Is Not Enough: Benefit for RAWA (2002)
- Sample This, Too (2002)
- Voices in the Wilderness: A Benefit Compilation (2005)
- Let Them Know: The Story of Youth Brigade and BYO Records (2009)
