= Wasting Light Tour =

2011–12 concert tour by the Foo Fighters

Wasting Light World Tour
- World tour by Foo Fighters
- Location: Worldwide
- Associated album: Wasting Light
- Start date: January 28, 2011
- End date: September 22, 2012
- No. of shows: 80
- Box office: $67 million (55 shows)

Foo Fighters concert chronology
- Echoes, Silence, Patience & Grace Tour (2007–2008); Wasting Light World Tour (2011–12); Sonic Highways World Tour (2014–15)

Wasting Light World Tour was a concert tour by American rock band Foo Fighters, in support of their seventh studio album Wasting Light. It began on January 28, 2011 at a secret show at Velvet Jones in Santa Barbara, California where they debuted the album in full. The tour included dates across Europe, Oceania, North and South America and included festival dates such as Reading and Leeds Festival as well a series of performances in hardcore fans' garages which was documented in their "Garage Tour" documentary on YouTube.

== Background ==
The tour started with a series of secret intimate shows across California including at The Roxy. They also played at the Shockwaves NME Awards 2011 show at O2 Brixton Academy and was their first performance at the venue since the There Is Nothing Left to Lose tour.

The tour featured a 52 page rider which included a series of jokey requests including a "ban on light sabers, garden gnomes, and tridents at show venues."

Many special guests joined the band on stage during the tour including Roger Daltrey, Lemmy, Phil Campbell, Bob Mould, Roger Taylor, Alice Cooper, Sea Sick Steve, John Paul Jones, Queen, Perry Farrell, Tenacious D, Joan Jett, Krist Novoselic, Fee Waybill, CeeLo Green, Roger Waters, Mick Jagger, Danny Clinch, deadmau5 and Rufus Tiger Taylor.

== Songs performed ==
Foo Fighters

- "Alone + Easy Target"
- "Big Me"
- "For All The Cows"
- "Exhausted"
- "I'll Stick Around"
- "This Is a Call"
- "Wattershed"

The Colour and the Shape

- "Enough Space"
- "Everlong"
- "Hey, Johnny Park!"
- "Monkey Wrench"
- "My Hero"
- "New Way Home"
- "See You"
- "Up in Arms"

There Is Nothing Left to Lose

- "Aurora"
- "Breakout"
- "Generator"
- "Learn to Fly"
- "Stacked Actors"

One by One

- "All My Life"
- "Times Like These"

In Your Honor

- "Best of You"
- "Cold Day in the Sun"
- "DOA"

Echoes, Silence, Patience & Grace

- "Let It Die"
- "Long Road to Ruin"
- "The Pretender"

Greatest Hits

- "Wheels"

Wasting Light

- "Arlandria"
- "Back and Forth"
- "Bridge Burning"
- "Dear Rosemary"
- "I Should Have Known"
- "A Matter of Time"
- "Miss the Misery"*
- "Rope"
- "These Days"
- "Walk"
- "White Limo"

Other (non-album songs)

- "Butterflies"
- "Skin and Bones"
- "Winnebago"

Covers

- "19th Nervous Breakdown" (The Rolling Stones)
- "Ace of Spades" (Motörhead)
- "Back in the Doghouse" (Seasick Steve)
- "Bad Reputation (Joan Jett)
- "Breakdown" (Tom Petty and the Heartbreakers)
- "Blackbird" (The Beatles)
- "Everybody Wants Some!!" (Van Halen)
- "Happy Birthday to You" (Patty Hill & Mildred J. Hill)
- "Hocus Pocus" (Focus)
- "I Love Rock 'n' Roll" (The Arrows)
- "I'm Eighteen" (Alice Cooper)
- "I'm the One" (Van Halen)
- "In The Flesh?" (Pink Floyd)
- "It's Only Rock 'n Roll (But I Like It)" (The Rolling Stones)
- "School's Out" (Alice Cooper)
- "Shake Your Blood" (Probot)
- "Surrender" (Cheap Trick)
- "Tie Your Mother Down" (Queen)
- "Young Man Blues" (Mose Allison)

== Opening acts ==
- Scream – North America
- Bob Mould – North America
- CeeLo Green - United Kingdom

== Tour dates ==
List of concerts, showing date, city, country, venue, tickets sold, attendance, and gross revenue
Date	City	Country	Venue
Intimate California Shows
January 28, 2011	Santa Barbara	United States	Velvet Jones
February 4, 2011	Los Angeles	United States	Dragonfly
February 7, 2011	West Hollywood	United States	The Roxy
February 8, 2011	Los Angeles	United States	Spaceland
February 15, 2011	West Hollywood	United States	The Troubadour
Europe
February 23, 2011 (Note: For the 2011 Shockwaves NME Awards)	London	England	O2 Brixton Academy
February 25, 2011 (Note: For the 2011 NME Awards "Big Gig")	London	England	Wembley Arena
February 26, 2011	London	England	Dingwalls
February 28, 2011	Cologne	Germany	Gloria-Theater
March 4, 2011	Stockholm	Sweden	Nalen
SXSW Festival
March 15, 2011	Austin	United States	Stubb's Bar-B-Q
March 16, 2011	Austin	United States	Austin Music Hall
Oceania
March 22, 2011	Auckland	New Zealand	Auckland Town Hall
March 24, 2011	Sydney	Australia	Goat Island
March 25, 2011	Sydney	Australia	University of Sydney
March 27, 2011	Brisbane	Australia	Riverstage
North America
April 16, 2011	Long Beach	United States	Fingerprints Music
Europe
May 14, 2011 (Note: For the 2011 BBC Radio 1's Big Weekend)	Carlisle	England	Carlisle Lake District Airport
North America
May 17, 2011	Tulsa	United States	BOK Center
May 18, 2011	North Little Rock	United States	Verizon Arena
May 20, 2011	Memphis	United States	FedExForum
May 21, 2011	Gulf Shores	United States	Hangout Music Festival
May 23, 2011	Council Bluffs	United States	Mid-America Center
May 26, 2011	Missoula	United States	Adams Center
May 27, 2011 (Note: For the 2011 Sasquatch! Music Festival)	George	United States	The Gorge Amphitheatre
June 4, 2011 (Note: For the 2011 KROQ Weenie Roast)	Irvine	United States	Verizon Wireless Amphitheatre
Europe
June 9, 2011 (Note: For the 2011 Greenfield Festival)	Interlaken	Switzerland	Flugplatz Interlaken
June 11, 2011 (Note: For the 2011 Isle of Wight Festival)	Isle of Wight	England	Seaclose Park
June 13, 2011 (Note: For the 2011 Pinkpop Festival)	Landgraaf	Netherlands	Megaland
June 15, 2011 (Note: For the 2011 Rock in IdRho Festival)	Milan	Italy	Fiera Milano
June 17, 2011 (Note: For the 2011 Southside Festival)	Tuttlingen	Germany	Neuhausen ob Eck Airfield
June 18, 2011	Berlin	Germany	Kindl-Bühne Wuhlheide
June 19, 2011 (Note: For the 2011 Hurricane Festival)	Scheeßel	Germany	Eichenring
June 21, 2011	Copenhagen	Denmark	Refshaleøen
June 22, 2011	Stockholm	Sweden	Stockholm Olympic Stadium
June 24, 2011	Bærum	Norway	Telenor Arena
June 26, 2011	Helsinki	Finland	Kalasatama
July 2, 2011	Milton Keynes	England	National Bowl
July 3, 2011	Milton Keynes	England	National Bowl
July 6, 2011	Madrid	Spain	Palacio de Deportes de la Comunidad de Madrid
July 7, 2011 (Note: For the 2011 Optimus Alive! Festival)	Oeiras	Portugal	Passeio Marítimo de Algés
July 9, 2011 (Note: For the 2011 Oxegen Festival)	Naas	Ireland	Punchestown Racecourse
July 10, 2011 (Note: For the 2011 Oxegen Festival)	Naas	Ireland	Punchestown Racecourse
July 10, 2011 (Note: For the 2011 T in the Park Festival)	Kinross	Scotland	Balado
July 11, 2011 (Note: For the 2011 iTunes Festival)	London	England	The Roundhouse
North America
August 6, 2011	Chicago	United States	The Metro
August 7, 2011 (Note: For the 2011 Lollapalooza Festival)	Chicago	United States	Grant Park
August 9, 2011	Toronto	Canada	Air Canada Centre
August 10, 2011	Montreal	Canada	Bell Centre
Europe
August 20, 2011 (Note: For the 2011 FM4 Frequency Festival)	Sankt Pölten	Austria	Green Park
August 21, 2011 (Note: For the 2011 Highfield Festival)	Großpösna	Germany	Störmthaler See
August 23, 2011	Cologne	Germany	Lanxess Arena
August 24, 2011 (Note: For the 2011 Chiemsee Rocks Festival)	Übersee	Germany	Almfischer 1
August 26, 2011 (Note: For the Rock en Seine Festival)	Saint-Cloud	France	Domaine National de Saint-Cloud
North America
September 14, 2011	Saint Paul	United States	Xcel Energy Center
September 16, 2011	Kansas City	United States	Sprint Center
September 17, 2011	St. Louis	United States	Scottrade Center
September 19, 2011	Auburn Hills	United States	The Palace of Auburn Hills
September 20, 2011	Cleveland	United States	Quicken Loans Arena
September 22, 2011	Columbus	United States	Nationwide Arena
September 23, 2011	Pittsburgh	United States	Consol Energy Center
September 25, 2011	Buffalo	United States	First Niagara Center
September 26, 2011	East Rutherford	United States	Izod Center
October 9, 2011	Denver	United States	Pepsi Center
October 11, 2011	West Valley City	United States	Maverik Center
October 13, 2011	Inglewood	United States	The Forum
October 14, 2011	Inglewood	United States	The Forum
October 16, 2011	Phoenix	United States	US Airways Center
October 17, 2011	San Diego	United States	Viejas Arena
October 19, 2011	Oakland	United States	Oracle Arena
October 22, 2011 (Note: For the 2011 BlizzCon)	Anaheim	United States	Anaheim Convention Center
October 25, 2011	Vancouver	Canada	Rogers Arena
October 27, 2011	Calgary	Canada	Scotiabank Saddledome
October 28, 2011	Edmonton	Canada	Rexall Place
November 1, 2011	Sacramento	United States	Power Balance Pavilion
November 7, 2011	Duluth	United States	The Arena at Gwinnett Center
November 8, 2011	Charlotte	United States	Time Warner Cable Arena
November 10, 2011	Philadelphia	United States	Wells Fargo Center
November 11, 2011	Washington, D.C.	United States	Verizon Center
November 13, 2011	New York City	United States	Madison Square Garden
November 14, 2011	Newark	United States	Prudential Center
November 16, 2011	Boston	United States	TD Garden
Oceania
November 28, 2011	Perth	Australia	NIB Stadium
December 2, 2011	Melbourne	Australia	AAMI Park
December 3, 2011	Melbourne	Australia	AAMI Park
December 5, 2011	Adelaide	Australia	Adelaide Oval
December 8, 2011	Sydney	Australia	Sydney Football Stadium
December 10, 2011	Gold Coast	Australia	Metricon Stadium
December 13, 2011	Auckland	New Zealand	Western Springs Stadium
South America
April 1, 2012 (Note: For the 2012 Lollapalooza Chile Festival)	Santiago	Chile	O'Higgins Park
April 3, 2012 (Note: For the 2012 Quilmes Rock Festival)	Buenos Aires	Argentina	Estadio Monumental Antonio Vespucio Liberti
April 4, 2012 (Note: For the 2012 Quilmes Rock Festival)	Buenos Aires	Argentina	Estadio Monumental Antonio Vespucio Liberti
April 7, 2012 (Note: For the 2012 Lollapalooza Brazil Festival)	São Paulo	Brazil	São Paulo Jockey Club
North America
May 6, 2012 (Note: For the 2012 New Orleans Jazz & Heritage Festival)	New Orleans	United States	Fair Grounds Race Course
May 19, 2012 (Note: For the 2012 Bamboozle Festival)	Asbury Park	United States	
June 28, 2012 (Note: For the 2012 Summerfest)	Milwaukee	United States	Marcus Amphitheater
August 10, 2012 (Note: For the 2012 Outside Lands Music and Arts Festival)	San Francisco	United States	Golden Gate Park
Europe
August 13, 2012	Udine	Italy	Villa Manin
August 15, 2012	Prague	Czech Republic	O2 Arena
August 16, 2012 (Note: For the 2012 Gampel Open Air Festival)	Gampel	Switzerland	Festivalgelände Am Rotten
August 18, 2012 (Note: For the 2012 Pukkelpop Festival)	Hasselt	Belgium	Domein Kiewit
August 19, 2012 (Note: For the 2012 Lowlands Festival)	Biddinghuizen	Netherlands	Spijk en Bremerberg
August 21, 2012 (Note: For the 2012 Tennent's VitaL Festival)	Belfast	Northern Ireland	Boucher Road Playing Fields
August 24, 2012 (Note: For the 2012 Reading and Leeds Festivals)	Leeds	England	Bramham Park
August 26, 2012 (Note: For the 2012 Reading and Leeds Festivals)	Reading	England	Little John's Farm
North America
September 21, 2012 (Note: For the 2012 Music Midtown Festival)	Atlanta	United States	Piedmont Park
September 22, 2012 (Note: For the 2012 DeLuna Fest)	Santa Rosa Island	United States	Casino Beach
