= Concrete and Gold Tour =

2017–18 concert tour by the Foo Fighters

- World tour by Foo Fighters
- Promotional poster for the tour
- Location: Asia; Europe; North America; Oceania; South America
- Associated album: Concrete and Gold
- Start date: May 28, 2017
- End date: October 23, 2018
- Legs: 8
- No. of shows: 113
- Attendance: 1.35 million (75 shows)
- Box office: $114 million (75 shows)

Foo Fighters concert chronology
- Sonic Highways World Tour (2014–15); Concrete and Gold Tour (2017–18); Everything Or Nothing At All Tour (2024)

Concrete and Gold Tour was the ninth concert tour by American rock band Foo Fighters, in support of Concrete and Gold, their ninth studio album. It began May 28, 2017, in Napa, California, and it concluded October 23, 2018 in Calgary, Canada. It marked the first time since November 2015 that the band had toured. The tour also featured summer festivals in Europe and Asia.

The tour grossed $114 million from 75 shows and was attended by more than 1.35 million people.

== Songs performed ==
Foo Fighters

- "Big Me"
- "For All the Cows"
- "I'll Stick Around"
- "This Is a Call"
- "Weenie Beenie"
- "Wattershed"
- "Alone+Easy Target"

The Colour and the Shape

- "Enough Space"
- "Everlong"
- "Monkey Wrench"
- "My Hero"
- "Hey, Johnny Park!"
- "New Way Home"

There Is Nothing Left to Lose

- "Aurora"
- "Breakout"
- "Generator"
- "Learn to Fly"
- "Gimme Stitches"

One by One

- "All My Life"
- "Times Like These"
- "Low"

In Your Honor

- "Best of You"
- "Cold Day in the Sun"

Five Songs and a Cover

- "Skin and Bones"

Echoes, Silence, Patience & Grace

- "Ballad of the Beaconsfield Miners"
- "Let It Die"
- "The Pretender"

Greatest Hits

- "Wheels"

Wasting Light

- "Arlandria"
- "Dear Rosemary"
- "Rope"
- "These Days"
- "Walk"
- "White Limo"

Sonic Highways

- "Congregation"
- "Something from Nothing"

Saint Cecilia (EP)

- "Sean"

Concrete and Gold

- "Arrows"
- "Concrete and Gold"
- "Dirty Water"
- "La Dee Da"
- "Make It Right"
- "Run"
- "Sunday Rain"
- "The Line"
- "The Sky Is a Neighborhood"

Covers

- "Blackbird" (The Beatles)
- "Breakdown" (Tom Petty and the Heartbreakers)
- "Detroit Rock City" (KISS)
- "Let There Be Rock" (AC/DC)
- "Miss You" (The Rolling Stones)
- "Mountain Song" (Jane's Addiction)
- "Never Gonna Give You Up" (Rick Astley)
- "Requiem" (Killing Joke)
- "Stay with Me (The Faces)
- "Sun God" (Squirrel Bait)
- "Tom Sawyer" (Rush)
- "Under My Wheels" (Alice Cooper)
- "Under Pressure" (Queen and David Bowie)
- "We Will Rock You" (Queen)
- "Young Man Blues" (Mose Allison)
- "You Really Got Me" (The Kinks)

Non-complete covers

- "Another One Bites the Dust" (Queen)
- "Billie Jean" (Michael Jackson)
- "Blitzkrieg Bop" (Ramones)
- "Cat Scratch Fever" (Ted Nugent)
- "Dragon Attack" (Queen)
- "Eruption" (Van Halen)
- "Fat Bottomed Girls" (Queen)
- "Fly Like An Eagle" (Steve Miller Band)
- "Footloose" (Kenny Loggins)
- "For Those About to Rock (We Salute You)" (AC/DC)
- "Gimme Some Truth" (John Lennon)
- "God Save the Queen" (Sex Pistols)
- "Imagine" (John Lennon)
- "I'm the One" (Van Halen)
- "Jump" (Van Halen)
- "Love of My Life" (Queen)
- "My Sharona" (The Knack)
- "Outshined" (Soundgarden)
- "Panama" (Van Halen)
- "Paradise City" (Guns N' Roses)
- "Paranoid" (Black Sabbath)
- "Rio" (Duran Duran)
- "Rocker" (AC/DC)
- "Run to the Hills" (Iron Maiden)
- "Sexy MF" (Prince and The New Power Generation)
- "Stairway to Heaven" (Led Zeppelin)
- "Tie Your Mother Down" (Queen)
- "You're the One That I Want" (John Travolta and Olivia Newton-John)
- "YYZ" (Rush)

== Setlist ==
This set list is representative of the show on October 20, 2017. It does not represent all concerts for the duration of the tour.

1. "Run"
2. "All My Life"
3. "Learn to Fly"
4. "The Pretender"
5. "The Sky Is a Neighborhood"
6. "Walk"
7. "Rope"
8. "Sunday Rain"
9. "My Hero"
10. "These Days"
11. "Let it Die"
12. "I'll Stick Around"
13. "White Limo"
14. "Arlandria"
15. "Times Like These"
16. "Breakout"
17. "Make it Right"
18. "Skin and Bones"
19. "Fly Like an Eagle" (Steve Miller Band cover)
20. "Another One Bites the Dust" (Queen cover)
21. "Blitzkrieg Bop" (Ramones cover)
22. "Monkey Wrench"
23. "Best of You"

Encore

24. "Dirty Water"
25. "This Is a Call"
26. "Breakdown" (Tom Petty and the Heartbreakers cover)
27. "Everlong"

== Shows ==
List of concerts, showing date, city, country, venue, opening acts, attendance, and gross revenue
Date	City	Country	Venue	Opening acts	Attendance	Revenue
North America
May 28, 2017	Napa	United States	BottleRock Napa Valley	—N/a	—N/a	—N/a
Europe
June 16, 2017	Reykjavík	Iceland	Laugardalur Park	—N/a	—N/a	—N/a
June 19, 2017	Helsinki	Finland	Hietaniemi Beach	Biffy Clyro; The Kills; Apulanta; VANT	—N/a	—N/a
June 21, 2017	Riga	Latvia	Lucavsala Island	Biffy Clyro The Kills	—N/a	—N/a
June 24, 2017 (Note: The show on June 24, 2017, in Pilton at Worthy Farm is part of the Glastonbury Festival.)	Pilton	England	Glastonbury Festival		—N/a	—N/a
June 26, 2017	Budapest	Hungary	Budapest Sports Arena	God Damn	—N/a	—N/a
June 27, 2017	Prague	Czech Republic	O_{2} Arena	Red Fang	—N/a	—N/a
June 29, 2017 (Note: The show on June 29, 2017, in Gdynia at Gdynia-Kosakowo Airport is part of the Open'er Festival.)	Gdynia	Poland	Gdynia-Kosakowo Airport	G-Eazy; The Kills	—N/a	—N/a
June 30, 2017 (Note: The show on June 30, 2017, in Roskild at Roskilde Fairgrounds is part of the Roskilde Festival.)	Roskilde	Denmark	Roskilde Fairgrounds	Seun Kuti; Yasiin Bey; Father John Misty	—N/a	—N/a
July 2, 2017 (Note: The show on July 2, 2017, in Roskild at Werchter Festival Park is part of the Rock Werchter.)	Werchter	Belgium	Werchter Festival Park		—N/a	—N/a
July 3, 2017	Paris	France	AccorHotels Arena		—N/a	—N/a
July 6, 2017 (Note: The show on July 6, 2017, in Madrid at Caja Mágica is part of the Mad Cool Festival.)	Madrid	Spain	Caja Mágica	The Lumineers	—N/a	—N/a
July 7, 2017 (Note: The show on July 7, 2017, in Madrid at Passeio Marítimo de Algés is part of the Nos Alive Festival.)	Lisbon	Portugal	Passeio Marítimo de Algés	The Kills; The Courteeners; The Cult; Tiago Bettencourt	—N/a	—N/a
July 10, 2017	Athens	Greece	Odeon of Herodes Atticus	—N/a	—N/a	—N/a
Asia
August 19, 2017 (Note: The show on August 19, 2017, in Osaka at Maishima Sports Island is part of the Summer Sonic Festival.)	Osaka	Japan	Maishima Sports Island	Babymetal; Man with a Mission; Royal Blood; All Time Low; Circa Waves; The Struts	—N/a	—N/a
August 20, 2017 (Note: The show on August 20, 2017, in Chiba at Chiba Marine Stadium is part of the Summer Sonic Festival.)	Chiba	Japan	Chiba Marine Stadium	Babymetal; Man with a Mission; Royal Blood; All Time Low; Circa Waves; The Struts	—N/a	—N/a
August 22, 2017	Seoul	South Korea	Jamsil Soccer Field	—N/a	—N/a	—N/a
August 24, 2017	Bangkok	Thailand	Challenger Hall Arena	—N/a	—N/a	—N/a
August 26, 2017	Singapore		National Stadium	—N/a	—N/a	—N/a
Europe
September 10, 2017 (Note: The show on September 19, 2017, in Berlin at Treptower Park is part of the Lollapalooza.)	Berlin	Germany	Treptower Park	—N/a	—N/a	—N/a
September 14, 2017	Stockholm	Sweden	Vasateatern	—N/a	—N/a	—N/a
September 16, 2017	Barcelona	Spain	BARTS	—N/a	—N/a	—N/a
September 19, 2017	London	England	The O_{2} Arena	Idles	18,285 / 19,013	$1,641,900
September 21, 2017	London	England	Royal Albert Hall	—N/a	—N/a	—N/a
North America
October 7, 2017 (Note: The show on October 7, 2017, in San Bernardino at Glen Helen Regional Park is part of the Cal Jam 17.)	San Bernardino	United States	Glen Helen Regional Park	—N/a	—N/a	—N/a
October 12, 2017	Washington, D.C.	United States	The Anthem	—N/a	6,000 / 6,000	$610,525
October 14, 2017	Richmond	United States	Richmond Coliseum	The Struts	10,758 / 10,758	$1,019,176
October 15, 2017	Greensboro	United States	Greensboro Coliseum	The Struts	—	—
October 17, 2017	Columbia	United States	Colonial Life Arena	The Struts	—	—
October 18, 2017	Knoxville	United States	Thompson–Boling Arena	The Struts	—	—
October 20, 2017	Cincinnati	United States	U.S. Bank Arena	The Struts	—	—
October 26, 2017	Birmingham	United States	Legacy Arena	The Struts	10,684 / 11,200	$912,536
October 28, 2017	New Orleans	United States	Voodoo Music + Arts Experience	—N/a	—	—
November 7, 2017	Madison	United States	Kohl Center	The Struts	12,229 / 12,229	$1,205,329
November 8, 2017	Champaign	United States	State Farm Center	The Struts	8,877 / 9,000	$826,803
November 10, 2017	Des Moines	United States	Wells Fargo Arena	The Struts	13,660 / 13,660	$1,287,310
November 11, 2017	Sioux Falls	United States	Denny Sanford Premier Center	The Struts	10,945 / 10,945	$1,018,273
November 13, 2017	Wichita	United States	Intrust Bank Arena	The Struts	7,193 / 8,600	$585,835
November 15, 2017	Tulsa	United States	BOK Center	The Struts	12,064 / 12,064	$1,011,911
November 18, 2017 (Note: The show on November 18, 2017, in Mexico City at Autódromo Hermanos Rodríguez is part of the Corona Capital.)	Mexico City	Mexico	Autódromo Hermanos Rodríguez	—N/a	—	—
December 1, 2017	Fresno	United States	Save Mart Center	The Struts	—	—
December 2, 2017	Sacramento	United States	Golden 1 Center	The Struts	—	—
December 4, 2017	Spokane	United States	Spokane Veterans Memorial Arena	The Struts	—	—
December 5, 2017	Eugene	United States	Matthew Knight Arena	The Struts	—	—
December 7, 2017	Nampa	United States	Ford Idaho Center	Bob Mould	—	—
December 9, 2017	Billings	United States	Rimrock Auto Arena at MetraPark	Bob Mould	—	—
December 10, 2017	Casper	United States	Casper Events Center	Bob Mould	—	—
December 12, 2017	Salt Lake City	United States	Vivint Smart Home Arena	Bob Mould	—	—
December 31, 2017	Las Vegas	United States	The Cosmopolitan at Las Vegas	—N/a	—	—
Oceania
January 20, 2018	Perth	Australia	nib Stadium	Weezer	31,231 / 32,000	—
January 23, 2018	Adelaide	Australia	Coopers Stadium	Weezer	20,000 / 20,000	—
January 25, 2018	Brisbane	Australia	Suncorp Stadium	Weezer	49,852 / 52,500	—
January 27, 2018	Sydney	Australia	ANZ Stadium	Weezer	71,314 / 83,500	—
January 30, 2018	Melbourne	Australia	Etihad Stadium	Weezer	70,000 / 72,000	—
February 3, 2018	Auckland	New Zealand	Mt Smart Stadium	Weezer	—	—
South America (joint tour with Queens of the Stone Age)
February 25, 2018	Rio de Janeiro	Brazil	Maracanã Stadium	Ego Kill Talent	—	—
February 27, 2018	São Paulo	Brazil	Allianz Parque	Ego Kill Talent	—	—
February 28, 2018	São Paulo	Brazil	Allianz Parque	Ego Kill Talent	—	—
March 2, 2018	Curitiba	Brazil	Pedreira Paulo Leminski	Ego Kill Talent	—	—
March 4, 2018	Porto Alegre	Brazil	Estádio Beira-Rio	Ego Kill Talent	—	—
March 7, 2018	Buenos Aires	Argentina	Vélez Sarsfield	COYA	—	—
North America
April 18, 2018	Austin	United States	Austin360 Amphitheater	The Struts	—	—
April 19, 2018	The Woodlands	United States	Cynthia Woods Mitchell Pavilion	The Struts	—	—
April 21, 2018	Dallas	United States	Starplex Pavilion	The Struts	—	—
April 22, 2018	Bossier City	United States	CenturyLink Center	The Struts	—	—
April 25, 2018	Tampa	United States	MidFlorida Credit Union Amphitheatre	The Struts	—	—
April 26, 2018	West Palm Beach	United States	Coral Sky Amphitheater	The Struts	—	—
April 28, 2018	Atlanta	United States	Georgia State Stadium	The Struts	—	—
April 29, 2018	Jacksonville	United States	Metropolitan Park	The Struts	—	—
May 1, 2018	Lexington	United States	Rupp Arena	The Struts	—	—
May 3, 2018	Memphis	United States	FedEx Forum	The Struts	—	—
May 4, 2018	Nashville	United States	Bridgestone Arena	The Struts	—	—
Europe
June 1, 2018 (Note: The show on June 1, 2018, in Nürburg at Nürburgring is part of the Rock am Ring festival.)	Nürburg	Germany	Nürburgring	—N/a	—	—
June 3, 2018 (Note: The show on June 3, 2018, in Nuremberg at Zeppelinfeld is part of the Rock im Park festival.)	Nuremberg	Germany	Zeppelinfeld	—N/a	—	—
June 5, 2018	Gothenburg	Sweden	Ullevi	Goat; Frank Carter & The Rattlesnakes	—	—
June 10, 2018	Hamburg	Germany	Trabrennbahn Bahrenfeld	The Kills; Wolf Alice	—	—
June 11, 2018	Antwerp	Belgium	Sportpaleis	Wolf Alice	—	—
June 13, 2018	Bern	Switzerland	Stade de Suisse	The Kills; Wolf Alice	—	—
June 14, 2018 (Note: The show on June 14, 2018, in Firenze at Ippodromo delle Cascine is part of the Firenze Rocks festival.)	Florence	Italy	Ippodromo delle Cascine	—N/a	—	—
June 16, 2018 (Note: The show on June 16, 2018, in Landgraaf at Megaland is part of the Pinkpop festival.)	Landgraaf	Netherlands	Megaland	—N/a	—	—
June 17, 2018	Paris	France	Brétigny-sur-Orge Air Base	—N/a	—	—
June 19, 2018	Manchester	England	Etihad Stadium	Wolf Alice; The Cribs	—	—
June 22, 2018	London	England	London Stadium	Wolf Alice; Frank Carter & The Rattlesnakes	—	—
June 23, 2018	London	England	London Stadium	The Kills; Slaves; Starcrawlers	—	—
North America
July 6, 2018	Columbia	United States	Merriweather Post Pavilion	The Struts	—	—
July 7, 2018	Camden	United States	BB&T Pavilion		—	—
July 9, 2018	Quebec City	Canada	Festival de Quebec		—	—
July 10, 2018	Ottawa	Canada	Ottawa Bluesfest		—	—
July 12, 2018	Toronto	Canada	Rogers Centre	The Beaches The Struts	—	—
July 14, 2018	Wantagh	United States	Northwell Health at Jones Beach Theater	N/A	—	—
July 16, 2018	New York City	United States	Madison Square Garden	The Struts	—	
July 17, 2018	New York City	United States	Madison Square Garden	The Struts	—	
July 19, 2018	Pittsburgh	United States	PPG Paints Arena	N/A	—	—
July 21, 2018	Boston	United States	Fenway Park	N/A	—	—
July 22, 2018	Boston	United States	Fenway Park	N/A	—	—
July 25, 2018	Cuyahoga Falls	United States	Blossom Music Center	N/A	—	—
July 26, 2018	Noblesville	United States	Ruoff Home Mortgage Music Center	The Struts	—	—
July 29, 2018	Chicago	United States	Wrigley Field	Melkbelly The Struts	76,299 / 76,299	$6,490,979
July 30, 2018	Chicago	United States	Wrigley Field	Touched by Ghoul The Breeders	76,299 / 76,299	$6,490,979
September 1, 2018	Seattle	United States	Safeco Field	—	—	—
September 8, 2018	Vancouver	Canada	Rogers Arena	—	—	—
September 10, 2018	Portland	United States	Moda Center	—	—	—
September 12, 2018	San Jose	United States	SAP Center	—	—	—
September 14, 2018	San Diego	United States	KABOO Del Mar	—	—	—
October 6, 2018 (Note: The show on October 6, 2018, in San Bernardino at Glen Helen Regional Park is part of the Cal Jam 18.)	San Bernardino	United States	Glen Helen Regional Park	—	—	—
October 8, 2018	Phoenix	United States	Talking Stick Resort Arena	Gang of Youths	—	—
October 10, 2018	Denver	United States	Pepsi Center	Gang of Youths	—	—
October 12, 2018	Kansas City	United States	Sprint Center	Gang of Youths	—	—
October 13, 2018	St. Louis	United States	Enterprise Center	Gang of Youths	—	—
October 15, 2018	Detroit	United States	Little Caesars Arena	Gang of Youths	—	—
October 17, 2018	Milwaukee	United States	Fiserv Forum	Gang of Youths	—	—
October 18, 2018	St. Paul	United States	Xcel Energy Center	Gang of Youths	—	—
October 22, 2018	Edmonton	Canada	Rogers Place	—	—	—
October 23, 2018	Calgary	Canada	Scotiabank Saddledome	—	—	—
Total					174,930 / 177,704 (98.4%)	$9,107,687
