= Greatest Hits (Foo Fighters album) =

Greatest hits album by Foo Fighters
- Released: November 3, 2009
- Recorded: October 1994 – 2009
- Genres: Alternative rock; post-grunge; hard rock
- Length: 63:48
- Label: RCA
- Producers: Foo Fighters; Gil Norton; Adam Kasper; Nick Raskulinecz; Barrett Jones; Butch Vig

Foo Fighters chronology
Echoes, Silence, Patience & Grace (2007)	Greatest Hits (2009)	Wasting Light (2011)

Singles from Greatest Hits
- 1. "Wheels" Released: September 29, 2009

Greatest Hits is a greatest hits album released by American rock band the Foo Fighters on November 3, 2009.

== Release ==
Greatest Hits includes a selection of Foo Fighters hit singles. Two singles from their 1995 debut, Foo Fighters album ("This Is a Call" and "Big Me") are included. Three singles are included from 1997's The Colour and the Shape album ("Monkey Wrench", "Everlong" and "My Hero"). The Colour and the Shape remains the band's biggest selling album in the US. Two singles are included from 1999's There Is Nothing Left to Lose album ("Learn to Fly" and "Breakout") as are two singles from 2002's One by One album ("All My Life" and "Times Like These"). One single ("Best of You") is included from the band's biggest worldwide selling album In Your Honor, released in 2005. "Best of You" remains the band's highest-charting hit on the U.S., UK and Australian singles charts. Two singles are included from 2007's Echoes, Silence, Patience & Grace album ("The Pretender" and "Long Road to Ruin"). Greatest Hits also contains two new songs "Wheels" and "Word Forward".

"Wheels" is the first single taken from the album, which premiered on radio on September 23, 2009. The single was officially released on September 29, 2009. "Wheels" and "Word Forward", which was written for Dave Grohl's friend, Jimmy, who had recently died, were composed during the Echoes, Silence, Patience & Grace tour and recorded specifically for the compilation with producer Butch Vig.

A deluxe edition of the compilation includes a book and a DVD featuring some of the band's music videos and live performances. It also includes a video for "Wheels" directed by Sam Brown, who also worked on "The Pretender".

=== Release controversy ===
Dave Grohl has stated his displeasure with the release of a greatest hits album, stating he would have preferred to wait until after the band had retired. The band's label, however, had been wanting to release a compilation album for four years, and exercised a clause in the band's contract that allowed them to do so. Grohl has also mentioned that he felt that the album did not include some of the band's best work and that it was "like a CliffsNotes version of what we've been doing for the last 15 years". In the liner notes of the album, Grohl writes:

These 16 songs are what we're calling our "Greatest Hits." Not to be confused with "Our Best Songs" or "Our Favorite Songs," it is a collection of the songs that have defined our band's identity to most people over the years. The other 65 album tracks... well, some of those might be our greatest songs. "Aurora", "New Way Home", "MIA", "Exhausted", "A320"... depends on whom you ask. Personally, I don't think we've written our greatest songs yet. But that door is always open.

== Reception ==
Professional ratings
Aggregate scores
Source	Rating
Metacritic	85/100
Review scores
Source	Rating
AllMusic	4/5 stars
The A.V. Club	A
Kerrang!	5/5 stars
Pitchfork	7.0/10
Q	4/5 stars
Under the Radar	7/10

Reception was mostly positive for the compilation. Music critic Stephen Thomas Erlewine noted in his positive review that the compilation was missing some of the band's successful singles, most notably "DOA" and "I'll Stick Around". Matthew Perpetua of Pitchfork also noted the lack of "I'll Stick Around" on the compilation and suggested that the release would have been stronger with the inclusion of rarities and fan favorites, such as their cover of Prince's "Darling Nikki" or their popular soundtrack contribution "The One". Perpetua also writes "Like nearly all songs recorded specifically for [greatest hits compilations], 'Wheels' and 'Word Forward' are catchy but uninspired, and have no place among the heavy hitters in this collection." As of December 2015, it has sold 1,009,000 copies in the U.S.

== Track listing ==
=== CD ===
No.	Title	Writer(s)	Originally from	Length
1.	"All My Life"	Dave Grohl; Taylor Hawkins; Nate Mendel; Chris Shiflett	One by One, 2002	4:24
2.	"Best of You"	Grohl; Hawkins; Mendel; Shiflett	In Your Honor, 2005	4:16
3.	"Everlong"	Grohl	The Colour and the Shape, 1997	4:10
4.	"The Pretender"	Grohl; Hawkins; Mendel; Shiflett	Echoes, Silence, Patience & Grace, 2007	4:27
5.	"My Hero"	Grohl; Mendel; Pat Smear	The Colour and the Shape	4:19
6.	"Learn to Fly"	Grohl; Hawkins; Mendel	There Is Nothing Left to Lose, 1999	3:56
7.	"Times Like These"	Grohl; Hawkins; Mendel; Shiflett	One by One	4:28
8.	"Monkey Wrench"	Grohl; Mendel; Smear	The Colour and the Shape	3:53
9.	"Big Me"	Grohl	Foo Fighters, 1995	2:14
10.	"Breakout"	Grohl; Mendel; Hawkins	There Is Nothing Left to Lose	3:22
11.	"Long Road to Ruin"	Grohl; Hawkins; Mendel; Shiflett	Echoes, Silence, Patience & Grace	3:48
12.	"This Is a Call"	Grohl	Foo Fighters	3:55
13.	"Skin and Bones"	Grohl	Skin and Bones, 2006	4:04
14.	"Wheels"	Grohl; Hawkins; Mendel; Shiflett	Previously unreleased	4:38
15.	"Word Forward"	Grohl; Hawkins; Mendel; Shiflett	Previously unreleased	3:49
16.	"Everlong" (Acoustic version)	Grohl	Previously unreleased	4:11
Total length:				63:48

Amazon Exclusive Version bonus track
No.	Title	Writer(s)	Originally from	Length
17.	"Have a Cigar" (Pink Floyd cover)	Roger Waters	"Learn to Fly" single, 1999	4:00

Japan/EP version exclusive track
No.	Title	Writer(s)	Originally from	Length
17.	"Band on the Run" (Paul McCartney and Wings cover)	Paul McCartney; Linda McCartney	Radio 1 Established 1967, 2007 (Recorded in 2004)	5:07

=== DVD ===
No.	Title	Length
1.	"I'll Stick Around"
2.	"Big Me"
3.	"Monkey Wrench"
4.	"Everlong"
5.	"My Hero"
6.	"Walking After You"
7.	"Learn to Fly"
8.	"Next Year"
9.	"All My Life"
10.	"Times Like These"
11.	"Low"
12.	"Best of You"
13.	"DOA"
14.	"Resolve" (Non-glow version)
15.	"The Pretender"
16.	"Long Road to Ruin"
17.	"Wheels"
18.	"Everlong" (Live at Slane Castle, Slane, Ireland - Everywhere but Home DVD, 2003)
19.	"Breakout" (Live at Hyde Park, London, England - Skin and Bones DVD, 2006)
20.	"Skin and Bones" (Live at the Pantages Theater, Hollywood and Vine, Hollywood, Los Angeles, California, August 2006 - Skin and Bones DVD, 2006)
21.	"All My Life" (Live at the Wembley Stadium, Wembley, London, England, June 2008 - Live from Wembley Stadium DVD, 2008)
22.	"No Way Back" (Hidden bonus video)

- At the main menu, there is bullet hole that can be clicked, and it shows Dave Grohl performing "Home" (from the album Echoes, Silence, Patience & Grace, 2007) on the piano.

== Personnel ==
- Dave Grohl – lead vocals, guitar, drums (tracks 3, 5, 6, 8, 9, 12), bass (track 9, 12)
- Taylor Hawkins – drums (except 3, 5, 6, 8, 9, 12), backing vocals (tracks 14, 15), lead vocals (track 17)
- Nate Mendel – bass (except tracks 9, 12)
- Chris Shiflett – guitar (tracks 1, 2, 4, 7, 11, 13–15)
- Pat Smear – guitar (tracks 3, 5, 8, 13)

== Charts ==
=== Weekly charts ===
Weekly chart performance for Greatest Hits
Chart (2009)	Peak position
Australian Albums (ARIA)	1
Austrian Albums (Ö3 Austria)	10
Belgian Albums (Ultratop Flanders)	3
Belgian Albums (Ultratop Wallonia)	28
Canadian Albums (Billboard)	6
Croatian International Albums (HDU)	24
Danish Albums (Hitlisten)	23
Dutch Albums (Album Top 100)	9
Finnish Albums (Suomen virallinen lista)	22
German Albums (Offizielle Top 100)	8
Irish Albums (IRMA)	6
Italian Albums (FIMI)	14
Mexican Albums (Top 100 Mexico)	62
New Zealand Albums (RMNZ)	1
Norwegian Albums (VG-lista)	7
Polish Albums (ZPAV)	42
Scottish Albums (Official Charts)	4
Spanish Albums (Promusicae)	25
Swedish Albums (Sverigetopplistan)	12
Swiss Albums (Schweizer Hitparade)	15
UK Albums (Official Charts)	4
UK Rock & Metal Albums (Official Charts)	1
US Billboard 200	11
US Top Rock Albums (Billboard)	3

2021–2022 weekly chart performance for Greatest Hits
Chart (2021–2022)	Peak position
Irish Albums (Official Charts)	3
Portuguese Albums (AFP)	4

=== Year-end charts ===
2009 year-end chart performance for Greatest Hits
Chart (2009)	Position
Australian Albums (ARIA)	21
Belgian Albums (Ultratop Flanders)	60
UK Albums (OCC)	41

2010 year-end chart performance for Greatest Hits
Chart (2010)	Position
Australian Albums (ARIA)	50
Belgian Albums (Ultratop Flanders)	28
European Albums (Billboard)	69
UK Albums (OCC)	71
US Billboard 200	159
US Top Rock Albums (Billboard)	48

2011 year-end chart performance for Greatest Hits
Chart (2011)	Position
Australian Albums (ARIA)	50
Belgian Albums (Ultratop Flanders)	27
UK Albums (OCC)	67

2012 year-end chart performance for Greatest Hits
Chart (2012)	Position
Australian Albums (ARIA)	63
UK Albums (OCC)	128

2013 year-end chart performance for Greatest Hits
Chart (2013)	Position
UK Albums (OCC)	140

2015 year-end chart performance for Greatest Hits
Chart (2015)	Position
UK Albums (OCC)	72
US Billboard 200	146

2016 year-end chart performance for Greatest Hits
Chart (2016)	Position
UK Vinyl Albums (OCC)	38

2017 year-end chart performance for Greatest Hits
Chart (2017)	Position
UK Albums (OCC)	50
US Top Rock Albums (Billboard)	85

2018 year-end chart performance for Greatest Hits
Chart (2018)	Position
Australian Albums (ARIA)	55
UK Albums (OCC)	71
US Top Rock Albums (Billboard)	40

2019 year-end chart performance for Greatest Hits
Chart (2019)	Position
Australian Albums (ARIA)	81
UK Albums (OCC)	78
US Top Rock Albums (Billboard)	86

2020 year-end chart performance for Greatest Hits
Chart (2020)	Position
Australian Albums (ARIA)	67
UK Albums (OCC)	65
US Top Rock Albums (Billboard)	35

2021 year-end chart performance for Greatest Hits
Chart (2021)	Position
Australian Albums (ARIA)	51
UK Albums (OCC)	65
US Top Rock Albums (Billboard)	29

2022 year-end chart performance for Greatest Hits
Chart (2022)	Position
Australian Albums (ARIA)	46
New Zealand Albums (RMNZ)	33
UK Albums (OCC)	59
US Billboard 200	109
US Top Rock Albums (Billboard)	21

2023 year-end chart performance for Greatest Hits
Chart (2023)	Position
US Billboard 200	189
US Top Rock Albums (Billboard)	20

2024 year-end chart performance for Greatest Hits
Chart (2024)	Position
US Billboard 200	142

=== Decade-end charts ===
Decade-end chart performance for Greatest Hits
Chart (2010–2019)	Position
Australian Albums (ARIA)	31
UK Albums (OCC)	53

== Certifications ==
Certifications for Greatest Hits
Region	Certification	Certified units/sales
Australia (ARIA)	6× Platinum	420,000^{‡}
Austria (IFPI Austria)	Gold	10,000^{*}
Belgium (BRMA)	Gold	15,000^{*}
Canada (Music Canada)	Gold	40,000^{^}
Denmark (IFPI Danmark)	Platinum	20,000^{‡}
Germany (BVMI)	3× Gold	300,000^{‡}
Ireland (IRMA)	Platinum	15,000^{^}
Italy (FIMI)	Platinum	50,000^{*}
New Zealand (RMNZ)	5× Platinum	75,000^{‡}
United Kingdom (BPI)	5× Platinum	1,500,000^{‡}
^{*} Sales figures based on certification alone.^{^} Shipments figures based on certification alone.^{‡} Sales+streaming figures based on certification alone.
