= The Colour and the Shape =

1997 studio album by Foo Fighters

Studio album by Foo Fighters
- Released: May 20, 1997
- Recorded: November 1996 – February 1997
- Studios: Grandmaster (Hollywood, California); Bear Creek (Woodinville, Washington); WGNS (Washington, D.C.)
- Genres: Alternative rock; post-grunge; hard rock; grunge; punk rock
- Length: 46:57
- Labels: Roswell; Capitol
- Producer: Gil Norton

Foo Fighters chronology
Foo Fighters (1995)	The Colour and the Shape (1997)	There Is Nothing Left to Lose (1999)

Singles from The Colour and the Shape
- 1. "Monkey Wrench" Released: April 28, 1997; 2. "Everlong" Released: August 18, 1997; 3. "My Hero" Released: January 19, 1998

The Colour and the Shape is the second studio album by American rock band Foo Fighters, released on May 20, 1997, by Roswell and Capitol Records. It was the first album by the Foo Fighters to be recorded as a full band, as the previous self-titled album (1995) was both written and recorded entirely by frontman Dave Grohl. The Colour and the Shape is widely considered a defining album of the post-grunge genre, with its three singles becoming staples of rock-oriented radio in the United States. It was among the highest-selling rock albums of 1997 and 1998, and was nominated for Best Rock Album at the 40th Annual Grammy Awards.

After the debut became an international success, Grohl recruited guitarist Pat Smear, bassist Nate Mendel, and drummer William Goldsmith to form the band's full lineup. The group convened in the fall of 1996 for pre-production on a second album, and brought in Gil Norton as producer to establish a pop sensibility for the tracks. The band strived to create a full-fledged rock record, contrary to music press predictions that it would be another grunge offshoot.

Primarily inspired by Grohl's divorce from photographer Jennifer Youngblood in 1996, The Colour and the Shape is more lyrically introspective and musically developed than the Foo Fighters' debut. The album's track listing was designed to resemble a therapy session, splitting the album between uptempo tracks and ballads to reflect conflicting emotions. Early sessions at the Bear Creek Studio in Washington went poorly and the band discarded most of those recordings. The band regrouped without Goldsmith in early 1997 to record at Hollywood's Grandmaster Recordings studio, with Grohl sitting in on drums instead. Goldsmith was offended and disgruntled that most of his material had been re-recorded, and he left the band shortly thereafter.

The singles "Monkey Wrench", "Everlong", and "My Hero" peaked within the Top 10 of US rock radio charts, and the album charted at number ten on the Billboard 200. The album was also a commercial success on an international level, peaking at number three in the United Kingdom. Critics deemed the album a significant American rock release of its era, and it continues to be viewed as a seminal modern rock album in retrospective assessments. The Colour and the Shape remains the Foo Fighters' biggest seller in the U.S., having sold more than two million copies according to Nielsen SoundScan. The album was remastered and reissued in 2007 with several bonus tracks for its tenth anniversary.

The Colour and the Shape was Foo Fighters' last album to be released and marketed by Capitol Records. After the band, along with their label Roswell Records, signed to RCA Records, its distribution, along with their debut album, has switched to RCA.

== Background ==
The album was the debut of Foo Fighters as a full band. On the first album under the Foo Fighters name, frontman Dave Grohl had performed and recorded all of the parts by himself, with the exception of one guitar part played by Greg Dulli. The band's original lineup assembled for their exhaustive touring schedule throughout 1995 and 1996, during which the band became an international sensation on the strength of singles "This Is a Call", "I'll Stick Around", and "Big Me". Although the music press generally speculated the band's sophomore record would showcase grunge-inspired garage rock, the band's intention was to make a more straightforward rock record. The deal the band struck with Capitol Records afforded them a large degree of creative control over the band's true "debut." The songs on the record were composed during soundchecks during their extensive touring over the previous eighteen months. Mendel said "the germ of every song is Dave's," with the frontman providing a riff and a basic song structure. The band would then jam and each member would contribute to some aspect of the song. However, an early version of “February Stars” was recorded by Grohl in January 1994 when he was still in Nirvana during the sessions that produced their final song, “You Know You’re Right”.

Grohl recruited producer Gil Norton to provide additional pop polish to the material. He especially wanted to hear guitar overdubs and harmonies with significant clarity. Grohl said he admired Norton for his earlier work with the Pixies and his ability to "distill a coherent pop song out of all [the Pixies'] multi-layered weirdness." Norton was highly demanding of the band's performance, prompting bassist Nate Mendel to practice and improve his musical skill. Grohl said "it was frustrating and it was hard and it was long, but at the end of the day you listened back to what you'd done and you understood why you had to do it one million times."

== Recording and production ==
While recording this record two marriages fell apart, we lost a drummer, someone nearly went to jail, and we discovered late in the day that record making is hellishly expensive and best done with a budget prepared beforehand.

— Nate Mendel, May 2007

The Colour and the Shape was recorded over the period of two months, primarily at Grandmaster Recorders in Hollywood from January to February 1997. The band spent two weeks in pre-production the previous autumn, rehearsing the tracks and changing arrangements. Norton had his greatest impact during pre-production, during which he spent days with Grohl in his hotel room "stripping the songs back to their absolute basics." His role in production taught the band the importance of self-editing and gave them confidence to see "the larger picture in a song." Afterward, the band set off for Bear Creek Studio in Woodinville, Washington, where the first recording sessions for The Colour and the Shape began on November 18, 1996. Mendel described Bear Creek as "a converted barn with a salmon stream running through it". The studio was located on a farm and, for the duration of these sessions, the band lived in a cabin adjacent to the studio.

Grohl, who described the sessions at Bear Creek as a "bad experience," decided to scrap nearly all of the recorded tracks. The band took a break for the holidays, during which Grohl returned to Virginia and wrote several new songs. He recorded two of these songs by himself at WGNS Studios in Washington, D.C.: "Walking After You" and an acoustic version of "Everlong".

In February 1997, the band—minus drummer William Goldsmith—relocated to Hollywood's Grandmaster Recorders, which Mendel said was "a small studio that sometimes moonlighted as a porn set, and looked the part." For a period of four weeks, the band re-recorded most of the album with Grohl playing the drum tracks. Grohl's drumming started with only "Monkey Wrench", as Grohl and Norton felt the drums on that song needed more work, but by the end of the sessions recordings of Goldsmith's drumming remained on only two tracks, "Doll" and "Up in Arms". According to Grohl, Goldsmith's drumming had good moments, but his performances mostly did not fit what Grohl had conceived for the drum track, so the frontman decided to redo them himself. Goldsmith even asked if he should go to Los Angeles, but Grohl declined and said he was only performing overdubs. Eventually, Mendel told Goldsmith the situation. Grohl said that he still wanted Goldsmith as a member of the band, despite replacing his tracks, but the disgruntled drummer decided to leave the Foo Fighters instead. Speaking in 2011 about the tension that surrounded Goldsmith's departure, Grohl said, "There were a lot of reasons it didn't work out […] but there was also a part of me that was like, you know, I don't know if I'm finished playing the drums yet. […] I wish that I would have handled things differently."

After the move to Los Angeles, the album's budget ballooned and deadlines became a more pressing concern. Studio time was expensive and the group was pressured by Capitol to deliver the record in a timely fashion. However, the pressure never adversely affected the band members, whose main priorities were to make "music for its own sake […] and let the commercial concerns take care of themselves."

The album's title came from the band's tour manager of the time, who would often spend afternoons rummaging thrift stores and purchasing strange memorabilia; on one occasion, he purchased a bowling pin with red and white stripes, remarking to the band he rather liked "the colour and the shape" of the object. The group found the phrase arbitrary and hilarious and decided to use it as the title rather than trying to choose a title based on the music's themes or moods. They chose the British spelling of "colour" with a "u" as a tribute to Norton, who is British. A title track was written and recorded for The Colour and the Shape during the Bear Creek sessions, but like most of the other songs attempted there, it did not reach the album's final track list. Noted as "rawer, noisier and thrashier" than the rest of the songs on the album by Louder Sound's Paul Brannigan, it later became a b-side to the album's eventual lead single, "Monkey Wrench". After settling on a track sequence, Grohl was struck by the impression that the album's flow from start to finish resembled a therapy session, moving from fear and anxiety at the start to self-assurance and resolve by the end. He even considered placing a therapist's couch on the album cover.

== Composition ==
Professional reviewers have characterized the musical genre of The Colour and the Shape as alternative rock, grunge, post-grunge, punk rock, and hard rock. Writing in Melody Maker, Victoria Segal said the album was more cohesive than the debut and was unified by a theme of "battered romanticism". More specifically, many of the lyrics address the dissolution of Grohl's marriage to Jennifer Youngblood during the winter of 1996, which Grohl said had been "the winter of my discontent." The album's track sequence reflects this sentiment, chronicling his change from chaos to newfound happiness. Grohl admitted the lyrics of the previous album had been "obscure" and "nonsense," but Norton challenged Grohl to write lyrics that were more meaningful and comprehensible. Grohl delved deeper into his feelings with the lyrics and said "there was a new freedom: 'Wow, I can actually write about things I feel strongly about and things that mean something to me and things I wouldn't normally say in everyday conversation.'" The frontman stated that the experience was "kind of liberating," comparing the album to going to a weekly visit to the therapist "and then the rest of the week feel pretty good about everything." Grohl also found new strength in his singing, overcoming insecurities he had about his singing voice on the debut. Three types of songs permeate the record: ballads, up-tempo tracks and combinations of the two. Grohl felt they were representative of the specific emotions he would feel after the divorce.

=== Track information ===
The album's opener, "Doll", involves the fear of entering into situations unprepared. Regarding "Monkey Wrench", Grohl stated that it was "a song about realizing that you are the source of all of the problems in a relationship and you love the other person so much, you want to free them of the problem, which is actually yourself. It was a riff that turned into another riff that turned into another riff and ended up being a nice little power punk song." In another interview, Grohl stated his pride in the song: "With Monkey Wrench I remember I had the main riff, but I didn't have the little jangly riff that goes over the top of it and I thought it needed something. So I came up with the jangly riff and thought 'Oh my God this is never gonna fly! Everyone's gonna hate it'. But I was really excited the first time I heard it on the radio—it was in the middle of a load of mid-'90s grunge shit and I thought it was so killer." The song was released as the first single from the album in 1997.

The lyrics to "Hey, Johnny Park!" song follow a series of different themes ("about 15 different things", according to Grohl). Johnny Park is the name of one of Grohl's childhood friends; he noted, "we were like brothers from the age of 5 to 12" and that he named the song after Park in hopes that he might restore contact with him. "My Poor Brain" experiments with different dynamics, both musically and lyrically in nature. Grohl likened the disparity in sounds to changes from Jackson Five to Black Sabbath. Grohl described the concept of "Wind Up" as about successful musicians who constantly complain about their lives to the press. He elaborated, "It drives me insane when I hear musicians that don't understand how fortunate they are that they don't have to go and pump gas for twelve hours a day. They can sit on their couch and smoke pot, and complain to their friends that they hate it when someone comes up and says that he likes their band... there are two sides: there's the reluctant rock-star, and then there is the prying journalist that almost lives for the reluctant rock-star, it's just talking "about the hand you've been dealt." Every time I hear about "the hand you've been dealt," it drives me fucking nuts, spare me your confessions... I've had so many fucking bullshit jobs for the half of my life—you know, working in furniture warehouses and planting trees, painting houses—and it's a lot more fun to play music."

Grohl described "Up in Arms" as "A typical love song. It's almost like a Knack song, just a simple pop song." Also in the song, Dave changed the last line which is meant to sing "always coming back I cannot forget you girl" to "always coming back I cannot forget you Gil" in reference to their producer Gil Norton. "My Hero" criticizes idolatry and instead extolls friends who are ordinary heroes, which has been considered a statement on fame and partially inspired by former bandmate Kurt Cobain. In Grohl's own words, the song is, "(his) way of saying that when I was young, I didn't have big rock heroes, I didn't want to grow up and be some big sporting hero. My heroes were ordinary people and the people that I have a lot of respect for are just solid everyday people—people you can rely on." This was the third single to be released from the album. "See You" was a song that, according to Grohl, only he liked out of the rest of the band. When Grohl entered the studio, he changed Goldsmith's original drum part to resemble Queen's "Crazy Little Thing Called Love" so the rest of the group would be satisfied with putting it on the record.

"Enough Space" is about Emir Kusturica's Arizona Dream (1993), one of Grohl's favorite films. He also said the song emerged from his desire to create a song that would be a good opener on their set lists, with a tempo that mimicked the jumping and bouncing of European crowds in the beginning of sets. The lyrics of "February Stars" are said to be about "hanging on by the tips of your fingers and hoping you don't slip and fall." This song dates back to at least January 1994, when an early take of the song with alternate lyrics, titled "Dave/Acoustic + Voc" was recorded by Grohl and Krist Novoselic on Harmonium during Nirvana's last recording session. "Everlong" was written when the band took a break from recording after the initial sessions. Grohl reworked "Everlong" by himself at his home in Virginia. It is considered to be one of the best songs by the band and is highly acclaimed. In 2000, David Letterman revealed that it is his favorite song.

"Walking After You" was written and recorded by Grohl on his own in a studio in Washington. This version appears on the album. The band would later re-record the song with all the members for The X-Files soundtrack, and this version was released as a single. Grohl stated that "Walking After You" was "an emotional, sappy song about getting dumped." On the record's closing track, "New Way Home," Grohl longs for his hometown and recalls the drive there on Highway 99. Through this journey, "I realise that it’s OK, I can make my way through all of this, and I’m not that freaked out at the end."

== Release ==
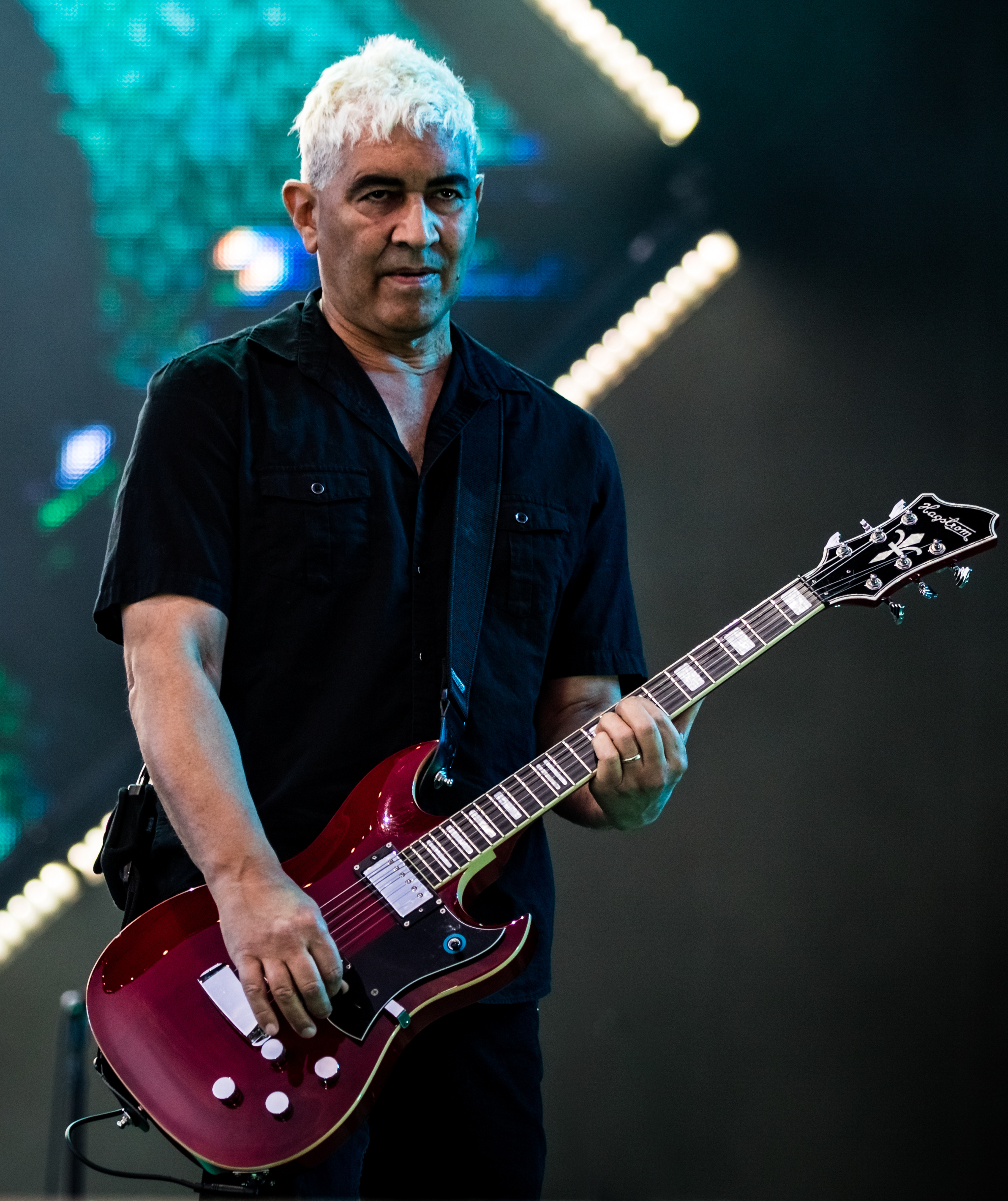
Guitarist Pat Smear announced his departure from the band following the album's release; he would return in 2005

The Colour and the Shape was released on May 20, 1997, preceded the month before by lead single "Monkey Wrench". The promotional campaign emphasized the band's group identity as well as each band member's individual personality. This strategy contrasted with the marketing approach for the prior album, which had centered Grohl at a time before Mendel and Smear felt comfortable being marketed as personalities. Each member gave interviews with press discussing their interests, with guitarist Pat Smear talking to guitar and fashion magazines. Just as recording was finished and Taylor Hawkins was hired as the new drummer (he was the former touring drummer for Alanis Morissette's Jagged Little Pill in 1995), Smear expressed his own plans to leave the band, claiming he was exhausted and not motivated to go through with another extended tour. This information was not yet highly publicized, and spokespeople for the band denied that the rumors of Smear's impending departure were true. The promotional tour started in May 1997. Smear departed during a September 4 concert at Radio City Music Hall, right before that year's 1997 MTV Video Music Awards, giving his instrument for the new guitarist, Franz Stahl, to finish the set.

"Everlong" was released as the album's second single in August 1997. It was the most commercially successful single from the record, being certified double platinum in the United States and being one of only three Foo Fighters songs to reach that status. Smear remained with the group until September 4, the night of the 1997 MTV Video Music Awards. After playing "Monkey Wrench" during the "pregame show" to the event, Smear announced that it was the final song he would play with the band, introducing Franz Stahl as the band's new guitarist before the band began playing "Everlong" later that evening. "My Hero" was released as the third and final single from the album in 1998. All three singles peaked inside the top ten of the Alternative Songs and Mainstream Rock charts.

To commemorate The Colour and the Shape's tenth anniversary, it was reissued on July 10, 2007, with six additional tracks: the B-sides "Dear Lover" and "The Colour and the Shape", plus covers of Killing Joke's "Requiem", Gary Numan's "Down in the Park", Gerry Rafferty's "Baker Street" and Vanity 6's "Drive Me Wild".

== Critical reception ==
Professional ratings
Review scores
Source	Rating
AllMusic	4/5 stars
Blender	4/5 stars
Entertainment Weekly	B
The Guardian	5/5 stars
Los Angeles Times	3/4 stars
NME	7/10
NME (10th anniversary)	8/10
Rolling Stone	3/5 stars
The Rolling Stone Album Guide	4/5 stars
Spin	6/10
The Village Voice	A−

Critical response to the record was generally positive. Victoria Segal at the UK-based Melody Maker viewed The Colour and the Shape as a significant American rock release, writing that it was "a great rock album at a time when great rock albums are viewed with increasing suspicion." Segal's review described the album as leagues ahead of other rock acts: "The first album might have been a collection of loveable songs, but lacked the sheer visceral attack that thrills this time round," Segal wrote, calling it "[a]n attack that would have […] almost any other US rock band biting their nails in anguish and embarrassment." Writing in The Guardian, Adam Sweeting found that the "glorious" album saw the band tempering their grunge sound with a more developed flair for pop songwriting.

Christina Kelly of Rolling Stone was largely positive, although she singled out Norton's production as distracting: "Colour has a big, radio-ready, modern-rock sound. Some might even call the album overproduced: On the ballads, the vocals are overprocessed and fake sounding." Entertainment Weekly praised the band's growth, but criticized the sound, which journalist David Browne described as "like much current alt-rock: been there, grunged that." In contrast, Stephen Thomas Erlewine of AllMusic described that production as revolutionary: "everything here wound up defining the sound of post-grunge modern rock, and it remains as perhaps the best example of its kind." In his review for The Village Voice, Robert Christgau said the music was routine but elevated by Grohl's "marital breakup content/concept," which allowed him to "fully inhabit the music that meant so much to him and millions of other Kurt Cobain fans." Ryan Schreiber of Pitchfork was less favorable, rating the album 3.4 out of 10 and calling the music "sorely dated."

Reviewing the tenth anniversary re-release, Pitchfork was mildly more favorable. Scoring the release a 5.8 out of 10, Stuart Berman stated, "The Colour and the Shape presented a true picture of the kind of group Grohl wanted to be in, had he not been sidetracked by the job of drumming for the biggest American rock band of the early 1990s [...] that band would turn out to be much more formulaically mall-punk than the Foos' torn 'n' frayed debut suggested." PopMatters' Mike Schiller reviewed the re-release with the opposite opinion, citing the self titled record's single "I'll Stick Around" as an example of "Grohl's strikingly non-aggressive (read: bland) vocal style" from the 1995 album; he then described "Monkey Wrench" as proof that Grohl "knew how to rock out" by comparison.

In 2020, Metal Hammer included it in their list of the top 10 albums of 1997. In 2024, Loudwire staff elected it as the best hard rock album of 1997.

=== Commercial performance ===
The Colour and the Shape peaked at number 10 on the Billboard 200, up from a peak of 23 for the 1995 self-titled debut. It also managed to reach the top ten in Australia, Canada, Greece, Ireland, New Zealand, Sweden, and the United Kingdom. The album has also been certified Platinum in the United States, Australia, Canada, and the United Kingdom.

== Track listing ==
=== Original release ===
All tracks are written by Foo Fighters (Dave Grohl, Nate Mendel, and Pat Smear), except where noted.

No.	Title	Writer(s)	Length
1.	"Doll"		1:23
2.	"Monkey Wrench"		3:51
3.	"Hey, Johnny Park!"		4:08
4.	"My Poor Brain"		3:33
5.	"Wind Up"		2:32
6.	"Up in Arms"		2:15
7.	"My Hero"		4:20
8.	"See You"		2:26
9.	"Enough Space"	Grohl	2:37
10.	"February Stars"		4:49
11.	"Everlong"	Grohl	4:10
12.	"Walking After You"	Grohl	5:03
13.	"New Way Home"		5:40
Total length:			46:57

Japanese release bonus track
No.	Title	Original single	Length
14.	"Dear Lover"	"My Hero" (UK & Japanese editions), "Next Year" (CD2)	4:32
Total length:			51:29

US / iTunes bonus track
No.	Title	Original single	Length
14.	"The Colour and the Shape"	"Monkey Wrench" (CD1)	3:24
Total length:			50:21

B-sides released as bonus tracks on 10th anniversary edition
No.	Title	Writer(s)	Original single	Length
14.	"Requiem" (Killing Joke cover)	Jaz Coleman, Paul Ferguson, Martin Glover, Geordie Walker	"Everlong" (CD2)	3:33
15.	"Drive Me Wild" (Vanity 6 cover)	Prince	"Everlong" (CD1)	3:13
16.	"Down in the Park" (Tubeway Army cover)	Gary Numan	"Monkey Wrench" (CD2)	4:08
17.	"Baker Street" (Gerry Rafferty cover)	Gerry Rafferty	"My Hero"	5:37
18.	"Dear Lover"		"My Hero" (UK & Japanese editions), "Next Year" (CD2)	4:32
19.	"The Colour and the Shape"		"Monkey Wrench" (CD1)	3:23
Total length:				71:23

=== Australian tour pack (Grey cover) ===
No.	Title	Writer(s)	Original single	Length
1.	"Requiem" (Killing Joke cover)	Jaz Coleman, Paul Ferguson, Martin Glover, Geordie Walker	"Everlong" (CD2)	3:34
2.	"Drive Me Wild" (Vanity 6 cover)	Prince	"Everlong" (CD1) and "My Hero" (Japanese edition)	3:25
3.	"Down in the Park" (Tubeway Army cover)	Gary Numan	"Monkey Wrench" (CD2), "Everlong" (Australian limited edition) and "My Hero" (Japanese edition)	4:07
4.	"Baker Street" (Gerry Rafferty cover)	Gerry Rafferty	"My Hero" (UK & Japanese editions), "Next Year" (CD2)	5:40
Total length:				16:46

=== French limited edition Inédits bonus disc ===
No.	Title	Writer(s)	Original single	Length
1.	"The Colour and the Shape"		"Monkey Wrench" (CD1)	3:23
2.	"Weenie Beenie" (live at Ile de Ré)	Grohl	previously unreleased	3:15
3.	"Winnebago" (live at Ile de Ré)	Grohl, Geoff Turner	previously unreleased	3:02
Total length:				9:40

=== Limited edition European bonus EP ===
No.	Title	Writer(s)	Original single	Length
1.	"Requiem" (Killing Joke cover)	Jaz Coleman, Paul Ferguson, Martin Glover, Geordie Walker	"Everlong" (CD2)	3:33
2.	"Drive Me Wild" (Vanity 6 cover)	Prince	"Everlong" (CD1) and "My Hero" (Japanese edition)	3:14
3.	"Down in the Park" (Tubeway Army cover)	Gary Numan	"Monkey Wrench" (CD2), "Everlong" (Australian limited edition) and "My Hero" (Japanese edition)	4:09
4.	"Baker Street" (Gerry Rafferty cover)	Gerry Rafferty	"My Hero" (UK & Japanese editions), "Next Year" (CD2)	5:37
Total length:				16:33

== Personnel ==
Credits adapted from The Colour and the Shape liner notes.

=== Foo Fighters ===
- Dave Grohl – vocals, guitar, drums
- Pat Smear – guitar
- Nate Mendel – bass guitar

=== Additional personnel ===
- William Goldsmith – drums on "Doll", "Up in Arms" (credited for slow intro); "The Colour and the Shape" and "Down in the Park" (10th anniversary edition’s bonus tracks only)
- Taylor Hawkins – drums on "Requiem", "Drive Me Wild", and "Baker Street" (10th anniversary edition's bonus tracks only)
- Lance Bangs, Chris Bilheimer and Ryan Boesch – handclaps on "See You"
- Louise Post – backing vocals on "Everlong" (uncredited)

=== Production ===
- Gil Norton – production
- Bradley Cook – recording (all except "Walking After You")
- Geoff Turner – recording on "Walking After You"
- Ryan Boesch, Todd Burke – engineering assistance (Grandmaster)
- Don Farwell, Ryan Hadlock – engineering assistance on "Doll" and "Up In Arms (intro)" (Bear Creek)
- Chris Sheldon – mixing
- Skip Taylor, Jason Mausa – mix engineering assistance
- Bob Ludwig – mastering
- Jeffery Fey, Foo Fighters, Tommy Steele – art direction
- Jeffery Fey, George Mimnaugh – design
- Andy Engel – logo design
- Josh Kessler – photography

== Charts ==
=== Weekly charts ===
1997 weekly chart performance
Chart (1997)	Peak position
Australian Albums (ARIA)	5
Australian Alternative Albums (ARIA)	1
Austrian Albums (Ö3 Austria)	19
Belgian Albums (Ultratop Flanders)	7
Belgian Albums (Ultratop Wallonia)	18
Canadian Albums (Billboard)	8
Dutch Albums (Album Top 100)	39
European Top 100 Albums (Music & Media)	9
Finnish Albums (Suomen virallinen lista)	12
French Albums (SNEP)	24
German Albums (Offizielle Top 100)	41
Greek Albums (IFPI Greece)	2
Irish Albums (IFPI Ireland)	10
New Zealand Albums (RMNZ)	10
Norwegian Albums (VG-lista)	20
Scottish Albums (Official Charts)	5
Swedish Albums (Sverigetopplistan)	10
Swiss Albums (Schweizer Hitparade)	50
UK Albums (Official Charts)	3
US Billboard 200	10

1999 weekly chart performance
Chart (1999)	Peak position
US Top Catalog Albums (Billboard)	35

2003 weekly chart performance
Chart (2003)	Peak position
Finnish Albums (Suomen virallinen lista)	5

=== Year-end charts ===
1997–1998 year-end chart performance
Chart (1997)	Position
Australian Albums (ARIA)	80
Canadian Albums (Nielsen Soundscan)	59
New Zealand Albums (RMNZ)	36
US Billboard 200	109

Chart (1998)	Position
US Billboard 200	124

== Certifications ==
Certifications for The Colour and the Shape
Region	Certification	Certified units/sales
Australia (ARIA)	Platinum	70,000^{^}
Canada (Music Canada)	Platinum	100,000^{^}
Denmark (IFPI Danmark)	Platinum	20,000^{‡}
Germany (BVMI)	Gold	250,000^{‡}
Italy (FIMI) sales since 2009	Gold	25,000^{‡}
Japan (RIAJ)	Gold	100,000^{^}
New Zealand (RMNZ)	2× Platinum	30,000^{‡}
United Kingdom (BPI)	Platinum	672,000
United States (RIAA)	Platinum	2,342,000
^{^} Shipments figures based on certification alone.^{‡} Sales+streaming figures based on certification alone.
