= Empty handed =

The phrase "coming up empty handed" is an idiom meaning "failing to achieve a goal".

Empty handed can also refer to:

- Empty handed, a song by Lea Michele in her album Louder.
- Empty handed, a song by the band Foo Fighters in their EP Songs from the Laundry Room
