= Exhausted (song) =

Promotional single by Foo Fighters

from the album Foo Fighters
- B-side: "Winnebago"
- Released: January 8, 1995
- Genre: Alternative rock, grunge, noise rock
- Length: 5:45
- Label: Capitol; Roswell
- Songwriter: Dave Grohl
- Producers: Grohl; Barrett Jones

Foo Fighters singles chronology
| "Exhausted" (1995) | "This Is a Call" (1995) |

"Exhausted" is a song by the American rock band Foo Fighters, released as a promotional single from their self-titled debut album on January 8, 1995 to Self-Pollution Radio, a radio station created by Eddie Vedder.

== Background and recording ==
"Exhausted" was one of the demos Dave Grohl showed to Kurt Cobain to see if he wanted to record any for a Nirvana album. Cobain never told Grohl that he liked the song a lot, with Grohl only learning about Cobain's liking to the track after Cobain died from Pat Smear. Cobain did not want to ask Grohl if he could write new lyrics or re-record his vocals. Grohl and Cobain recorded the song between January 28–29 1994. Although according to Gaar, Cobain was not present at the time Grohl recorded this song which would later appears on the Foo Fighters debut album.

== Composition and lyrics ==
"Exhausted" is a pop track, with lyrics being described by Kerrang! as "purging that darkness of the recent past at their outset".

== Release and reception ==
"Exhausted" was released as a promotional single ahead of the album on January 8, 1995 to Eddie Vedder's pirate radio station, Self-Pollution Radio. It received some airplay on US alternative radio. Since its release, it has been seen as one of the band and album's best songs. When ranking every Foo Fighters song for Spin magazine in 2014, Dan Weiss placed it 22, stating it is "pretty ballsy for a promo single, running almost six minutes long with stretches of feedback and murky vocals", calling it an "excellent opening salvo"while noting that it "shows that the band was never going to be predictable, even if those who only know their Modern Rock chart-toppers might think otherwise." Ranking the 20 best Foo Fighters songs for Exclaim! magazine, Dave MacIntyre placed it number 11, stating that it "sounds most akin to bands from the past (think Dinosaur Jr. or Yo La Tengo), and it's easily one of their noisier and grittier ones". In a ranking of every Foo Fighters song for Consequence of Sound, Michael Roffman placed it number 11, calling it a "sludgy, psychedelic ballad", while noting that that it "stays true" to Nirvana's 1993 album In Utero. Dave Grohl called it his favorite on Foo Fighters. Sam Law placed it at number 13 in his ranking of the 20 greatest Foo Fighters songs, stating it "was a sludgy, six-minute statement smothered in fuzz and charged with the same loud loneliness Dave had helped benchmark with Nirvana's In Utero less than two years earlier."

== Live Performances ==
The song made its live debut at the band's first show ever in 1995. It was played often from 1995 to 1996, usually closing the show. Performances of the song after 1996 would become less common, being played only six times from 1997 to 2003. Following that, the song would be dormant until 2012 when it was resurrected at the band's headlining set at that year's Reading Festival. The song also made an appearance at a show at The Showbox in 2014. This particular performance featured producer Barrett Jones on guitar, who produced the band's first album. The song would not be played again until 2025 during a run of surprise shows. The song has since then been played regularly, usually placed at the end of the set alongside Everlong.

== Credits and personnel ==
Credits are adapted from Apple Music:

- Dave Grohl – vocals, guitar, bass, drums
