= Alone + Easy Target =

Promotional single by Foo Fighters

from the album Foo Fighters
- Released: 1996
- Recorded: October 1994 at Robert Lang Studios in Seattle, Washington; November 23, 1995 at Maida Vale Studios in London (BBC sessions)
- Genre: Grunge
- Length: 4:05; 4:22 (BBC sessions)
- Label: Roswell/Capitol
- Songwriter: Dave Grohl
- Producers: Barrett Jones and Dave Grohl; Miti Adhikari (BBC sessions)

Foo Fighters singles chronology
"Big Me" (1996)	"Alone + Easy Target" (1996)	"Monkey Wrench" (1997)

"Alone + Easy Target" is a US radio-only single released by Foo Fighters from their self-titled debut album. It was released only as a promotional single.

== Song history ==
Dave Grohl wrote and recorded the song in its original form in 1991. Grohl played the demo of the song for Nirvana band-mate Kurt Cobain in a break between touring for the album Nevermind. According to Grohl, "I'd told him I was recording and he said, 'Oh, I wanna hear it, bring it by.' He was sitting in the bath-tub with a walkman on, listening to the song, and when the tape ended, he took the headphones off and kissed me and said, 'Oh, finally, now I don't have to be the only songwriter in the band!' I said, 'No, no, no, I think we're doing just fine with your songs.'" Nirvana would jam the song on soundchecks during the Europe 1991 tour.

== Live performance ==
The song was a setlist staple from 1995 to 2000. It disappeared afterwards; it was not played again until the Echoes, Silence, Patience & Grace tour in 2007, where it was played twice. The song would not be played again until 2012 on the Wasting Light tour, where it was again played twice. The song was also played twice on the Sonic Highways tour in 2015. It was played once in 2018 at a secret show promoting their festival Cal Jam. The song would not reappear again until 2025 during a run of secret shows (their first with drummer Ilan Rubin).

== Track listing ==
US promo single

1. "Alone + Easy Target" (album version)

== Accolades ==
Year	Publication	Country	Accolade	Rank
2019	The Guardian	United Kingdom	Dave Grohl's Landmark Songs	N/A

== Recording and release history ==
=== Studio versions ===
Date recorded	Studio	Producer	Releases	Personnel
January 3, 1992	Laundry Room Studios, Arlington, Virginia	Barrett Jones	Songs From the Laundry Room (2015)	Dave Grohl: vocals, guitars, drums and bass
October 14–20, 1994	Robert Lang Studios, Seattle, US	Barrett Jones	Foo Fighters (1995)	Dave Grohl: vocals, guitars, drums and bass
November 23, 1995	Maida Vale Studios, London, UK	John Peel	Big Me (1996); 00959525 (2020)	Dave Grohl: vocals, guitar; Pat Smear: guitar; Nate Mendel: bass; William Goldsmith: drums
