= Songs from the Laundry Room =

EP by Foo Fighters
- Released: April 18, 2015
- Studios: Laundry Room, Arlington, Virginia
- Genres: Alternative rock; post-grunge; punk rock
- Length: 12:22
- Label: RCA
- Producers: Barrett Jones, Dave Grohl

Foo Fighters chronology
Sonic Highways (2014)	Songs from the Laundry Room (2015)	Saint Cecilia (2015)

Songs from the Laundry Room is an EP by American rock band Foo Fighters, released exclusively for Record Store Day 2015. The songs were recorded by Dave Grohl during his time with Nirvana. As with the album Foo Fighters, Grohl plays all the instruments.

== Release ==
Released exclusively for Record Store Day 2015, just 4,000 copies were made available of the 10" vinyl. This release includes two demo versions of songs from the band's debut album Foo Fighters, a cover song, and a previously unreleased song, titled "Empty Handed".

=== Re-release ===
On September 11, 2015, it was announced that Foo Fighters intended to re-release their rare Songs From the Laundry Room EP as a mainstream release. Later the same day, the EP became available digitally.

== Track listing ==
All songs written and composed by Dave Grohl, except "Kids in America" by Marty and Ricky Wilde.

Side A
No.	Title	Recording Date	Length
1.	"Alone + Easy Target" (demo)	January 3, 1992	5:16
2.	"Big Me" (demo)	March 1994	2:19

Side B
No.	Title	Recording Date	Length
3.	"Kids in America" (Kim Wilde cover)	February 16, 1991	3:40
4.	"Empty Handed" (previously unreleased)	January 3, 1992	1:47

== Personnel ==
Personnel taken from Songs from the Laundry Room liner notes.

- Dave Grohl – vocals, all instruments
- Barrett Jones – backing vocals on "Kids in America", recording, mixing
- Gavin Lurssen – mastering
- Chris Bettman – vinyl lacquer cut
- Morning Breath Inc. – art

== Chart positions ==
Chart (2015)	Peak position
UK Physical Singles Sales (Official Charts Company)	3
UK Vinyl Singles Chart Top 40 (Official Charts Company)	3
US Top Hard Rock Albums (Billboard)	22
US Indie Store Album Sales (Billboard)	21
