= From Cradle to Stage (TV series) =

American television series

- Genre: Rockumentary
- Created by: Dave Grohl
- Based on: From Cradle to Stage: Stories from the Mothers Who Rocked and Raised Rock Stars by Virginia Grohl
- Directed by: Dave Grohl
- Opening theme: "Long Road to Ruin" by Foo Fighters
- Composer: Amanda Jones
- Country of origin: United States
- Original language: English
- No. of seasons: 1
- No. of episodes: 6

Production
- Executive producers: Dave Grohl; Virginia Grohl; Meg Ramsay; Ryan Kroft; Doug Pray; John Ramsay; Michael Rapino; Damian Vaca; Heather Parry
- Cinematography: Jessica Young
- Editors: Grant MacDowell; Kurt Mischkot; Meg Ramsay
- Running time: 43–54 minutes
- Production companies: Endeavor Content; Live Nation Productions; MTV Entertainment Studios; Roswell Films

Original release
- Network: Paramount+
- Release: May 6 – June 10, 2021

From Cradle to Stage is an American documentary television series created by Dave Grohl, based on the autobiographical novel From Cradle to Stage: Stories from the Mothers Who Rocked and Raised Rock Stars by his mother Virginia Grohl. The series premiered on Paramount+ on May 6, 2021.

== Development ==
After the success of Grohl's 2013 documentary film Sound City, he expressed interest to Billboard of doing something similar.

== Episodes ==
No.	Title	Original release date	Prod. code
1	"Dan and Christene Reynolds"	May 6, 2021	101
2	"Pharrell and Carolyn Williams"	May 13, 2021	102
3	"Miranda and Bev Lambert"	May 20, 2021	103
4	"Brandi and Teresa Carlile"	May 27, 2021	104
5	"Tom and Mary Morello"	June 3, 2021	105
6	"Geddy Lee and Mary Weinrib"	June 10, 2021	106

== See also ==
- Foo Fighters: Sonic Highways - a rockumentary series directed by Grohl and released on HBO.
