= For All the Cows =

1995 single by Foo Fighters

Single by Foo Fighters

from the album Foo Fighters
- Released: November 20, 1995
- Studio: Robert Lang, Seattle
- Length: 3:30
- Label: Parlophone, Roswell
- Songwriter: Dave Grohl
- Producers: Barrett Jones; Foo Fighters

Foo Fighters singles chronology
"I'll Stick Around" (1995)	"For All the Cows" (1995)	"Big Me" (1996)

"For All the Cows" (1995) is the third major single released by American rock band Foo Fighters from their 1995 debut album, Foo Fighters. It was only released in the United Kingdom, Europe, and Australia.

The song was written by Dave Grohl and was recorded, with the rest of the Foo Fighters album, in October 1994. Grohl performs all parts on the track, and it was produced by Barrett Jones.

== Composition ==
Kevin McKeough commented that the song fluctuated between "quiet, jazzy verses with explosive, Paul Bunyan-goes-jogging choruses".

== Track listings ==
7-inch blue vinyl single

1. "For All the Cows"
2. "Wattershed" (live at the Reading Festival, August 26, 1995)

CD single

1. "For All the Cows"
2. "For All the Cows" (live at the Reading Festival, August 26, 1995)
3. "Wattershed" (live at the Reading Festival, August 26, 1995)

== Charts ==
Chart (1995)	Peak position
Australia (ARIA)	69
European Hot 100 Singles (Music & Media)	70
UK Singles (Official Charts)	28

== Other versions ==
- A live version of the song, performed at the Reading Festival (August 26, 1995) appears on the Big Me single, the bonus disc of the Australian edition of Foo Fighters, For All the Cows single and I'll Stick Around single.
- An acoustic version of the song, performed at the Toshiba-EMI 3rd Studio (April 2, 1997) appears on the Australian and Japanese versions of the My Hero single.
- A live version of the song, performed at the Melkweg in Amsterdam (February 29, 2000) appears on the Dutch edition (Live in Holland Disc 2) of the Next Year single and the One by One "special edition bonus disc."
- Three live versions were released on the Everywhere but Home DVD, recorded in Toronto, the Black Cat in Washington D.C., and Reykjavik.
