= Wheels (Foo Fighters song) =

Single by Foo Fighters

from the album Greatest Hits
- Released: September 29, 2009
- Recorded: 2009
- Genre: Alternative rock; heartland rock
- Length: 4:38
- Label: Roswell; RCA
- Songwriters: Dave Grohl; Taylor Hawkins; Nate Mendel; Chris Shiflett
- Producer: Butch Vig

Foo Fighters singles chronology
"Let It Die" (2008)	"Wheels" (2009)	"Rope" (2011)

Music video
- "Wheels" on YouTube

"Wheels" is a single by American rock band Foo Fighters. The single premiered on radio on September 23, 2009, though it was officially released six days later. It was recorded for the band's Greatest Hits album with producer Butch Vig, and had its live premiere at the White House as part of an Independence Day celebration.

== Background ==
The song had its live premiere at the White House as part of an Independence Day celebration honoring military service members.

The song "Wheels", alongside the song "Word Forward", was recorded for the band's Greatest Hits album with producer Butch Vig. Both songs were written during the Echoes, Silence, Patience & Grace tour and had their first versions recorded at Grand Master Studios in Hollywood in 2008, later being recorded at the Foo Fighters's own Studio 606 in Los Angeles. Lead vocalist Dave Grohl invited Vig to work on the songs while at a party, and the successful outcome led Grohl to invite him to produce the band's next album Wasting Light.

== Reception ==
=== Critical ===
Benjamin Sheehan from Billboard magazine says: "The song has a Weezer-meets-The Fray vibe, and it flies out of the gate with feedback-laden riffs, well-timed stutter stops and a gentle balance of electric and acoustic guitars. Four-chord loops nicely underscore Grohl's frustration as he mourns life's failure to meet his expectations. Grohl sings during the opening verse, 'I wanted something better, man/I wished for something new'. For an act of this stature and talent, it's hard not to agree just a little". Alternatively, Pitchfork described the song as: "particularly aggravating, sounding something like a half-hearted attempt at a country-rock crossover."

=== Commercial ===
The song debuted at #73 on the Billboard Hot 100, which was their highest charting Billboard Hot 100 single since their 2007 hit "The Pretender". The song topped the Hot Rock Songs charts for two consecutive weeks.

== Music video ==
A music video was directed by Sam Brown, featuring the band performing in an old warehouse. The video premiered in the early hours of October 1, 2009 on AMTV.

== Track listing ==
Foo Fighters - Wheels (Foo Fighters song)
No.	Title	Length
1.	"Wheels"	4:38
2.	"Word Forward"	3:49

== Charts ==
=== Weekly charts ===
Chart (2009)	Peak position
Australia (ARIA)	21
Austria (Ö3 Austria Top 40)	36
Belgium (Ultratop 50 Flanders)	19
Canada Hot 100 (Billboard)	22
Canada Rock (Billboard)	1
Finland Download (Latauslista)	24
Germany (GfK)	42
Japan Hot 100 (Billboard)	43
Mexico Ingles Airplay (Billboard)	18
Netherlands (Dutch Top 40)	19
Netherlands (Mega Top 50)	19
Netherlands (Single Top 100)	45
New Zealand (Recorded Music NZ)	13
Quebec Airplay (ADISQ)	22
Scottish Singles Sales (Official Charts)	17
Sweden (Sverigetopplistan)	24
Switzerland (Schweizer Hitparade)	48
UK Singles (Official Charts)	22
US Billboard Hot 100	72
US Hot Rock & Alternative Songs (Billboard)	1

=== Year-end charts ===
Chart (2009)	Position
US Hot Rock & Alternative Songs (Billboard)	42
Chart (2010)	Position
US Hot Rock & Alternative Songs (Billboard)	30

== Certifications ==
Region	Certification	Certified units/sales
Australia (ARIA)	Platinum	70,000^{‡}
New Zealand (RMNZ)	Platinum	30,000^{‡}
United Kingdom (BPI)	Silver	200,000^{‡}
^{‡} Sales+streaming figures based on certification alone.
