= I'll Stick Around =

1995 single by Foo Fighters

Single by Foo Fighters

from the album Foo Fighters
- B-side: "How I Miss You"
- Released: September 4, 1995
- Studio: Robert Lang (Seattle, Washington)
- Genre: Grunge; alternative rock; punk rock
- Length: 3:52
- Label: Roswell; Capitol
- Songwriter: Dave Grohl
- Producers: Foo Fighters, Barrett Jones; Miti Adhikari (live)

Foo Fighters singles chronology
"This Is a Call" (1995)	"I'll Stick Around" (1995)	"For All the Cows" (1995)

Music video
- "I'll Stick Around" on YouTube

"I'll Stick Around" is a song by American rock band Foo Fighters. It was released on September 4, 1995 as the second single from their self titled debut album (1995).

The song was written by Dave Grohl in 1994, after the death of his former Nirvana bandmate Kurt Cobain, and was recorded, with the rest of the Foo Fighters album, in October. Grohl performs all parts on the track, and it was produced by Barrett Jones.

== Composition and lyrics ==
"I'll Stick Around" has been labeled a grunge, alternative rock, and punk rock song.

Its lyrics are about American singer-songwriter Courtney Love. "I don't think it's any secret that 'I'll Stick Around' is about Courtney," Dave Grohl said in 2009. "I've denied it for fifteen years, but I'm finally coming out and saying it. Just read the fucking words!"

== Music video ==
The video for this song was the first Foo Fighters music video and was directed by Jerry Casale, who was a member of and directed videos for Devo. Casale said he was chosen due to Devo's well-known surreal music videos, which would fit Grohl's request for a "non-video video", produced with a budget of just $60,000. The video shows the band performing the song in a room with a paper background while lights strobe and a giant spore floats around them (the spore, described by Casale as "Foo Ball", was inspired by the foo fighter phenomenon that named the band, and its original conception was a "bloated, charred, inflated girl representing Courtney", but as Grohl's management vetoed the idea, it was replaced by an "3D HIV virus [sic] based on medical models from Scientific America [sic] magazine"). This is interspersed with footage of Dave Grohl eating chess pieces (an idea by the singer himself, done with "frame by frame stop-action animation") and brushing his teeth with what appears to be a switchblade.

The video also appeared in Beavis and Butt-Head.

== Other versions ==
- A live version recorded on May 25, 1997, at the Manchester Apollo was released as a B-side to the CD2 version of the "Everlong" single.

== Track listings ==
7-inch red vinyl single and Cardsleeve CD single

1. "I'll Stick Around"
2. "How I Miss You"

UK CD and 12-inch single

1. "I'll Stick Around"
2. "How I Miss You"
3. "Ozone" (Ace Frehley cover)

Japanese CD maxi-single

1. "I'll Stick Around"
2. "How I Miss You"
3. "Ozone" (Ace Frehley cover)
4. "For All the Cows" (live at the Reading Festival, August 26, 1995)
5. "Wattershed" (live at the Reading Festival, August 26, 1995)

== Personnel ==
Musicians on the album

- Dave Grohl – guitars, vocals, bass, drums

Musicians in the music video

- Dave Grohl – guitar, vocals
- Nate Mendel – bass
- Pat Smear – guitar
- William Goldsmith – drums

== Charts ==
=== Weekly charts ===
Chart (1995)	Peak position
Australia (ARIA)	61
Canada Rock/Alternative (RPM)	2
European Hot 100 Singles (Music & Media)	49
UK Singles (Official Charts)	18
UK Rock & Metal (Official Charts)	1
US Radio Songs (Billboard)	51
US Alternative Airplay (Billboard)	8
US Mainstream Rock (Billboard)	12

=== Year-end charts ===
Chart (1996)	Position
US Mainstream Rock Tracks (Billboard)	99
