= This Is a Call =

1995 single by Foo Fighters

Single by Foo Fighters

from the album Foo Fighters
- B-side: "Winnebago" "Podunk"
- Released: June 19, 1995
- Studio: Robert Lang, Seattle
- Genre: Grunge; power pop; alternative rock
- Length: 3:52; 3:45 (live at Downing)
- Label: Roswell; Capitol
- Songwriter: Dave Grohl
- Producers: Foo Fighters, Barrett Jones; Pat McCarthy, Sylvia Massy (live)

Foo Fighters singles chronology
"Exhausted" (1995)	"This Is a Call" (1995)	"I'll Stick Around" (1995)

"This Is a Call" is a song by American rock band Foo Fighters, released as the lead single from the band's 1995 self-titled debut album. Released in June 1995, it is one of many songs Dave Grohl wrote and performed on the album when Foo Fighters was a one-man band.

== Origins ==
"This Is a Call" is one of the few songs on the Foo Fighters' debut album that does not date from Dave Grohl's days with Nirvana. It was a new song written in mid-1994, months after Kurt Cobain's death. Grohl married his long-time girlfriend Jennifer Youngblood and wrote the song while on honeymoon in Ireland, stating that "In that summer of 1994 I'd travelled a lot; I think I wrote 'This Is A Call' in Ireland. When I got back I booked five days in a recording studio, which seemed like an eternity, and I did the whole first Foo Fighters album in five days".

== Lyrics ==
Dave Grohl said about the song: "The chorus says 'This is a call to all my past resignation'. It's just sort of like a little wave to all the people I ever played music with, people I've been friends with, all my relationships, my family. It's a hello, and in a way a thank you."

"'This Is A Call' just seemed like a nice way to open the album, y'know, 'This is a call to all my past resignations...' I felt like I had nothing to lose, and I didn't necessarily want to be the drummer of Nirvana for the rest of my life without Nirvana. I thought I should try something I'd never done before and I'd never stood up in front of a band and been the lead singer, which was fucking horrifying and still is!"

== Release and reception ==
On June 19, 1995, "This Is a Call" was serviced to US alternative radio and was issued commercially in the United Kingdom as a 7-inch single, 12-inch single, and CD single. The following month, the song debuted at number 12 on the US Billboard Modern Rock Tracks chart and rose to a peak of number two the following month. The song also charted at number five on the UK Singles Chart.

No music video was made for the song; however, the band played the song live on the Late Show with David Letterman in mid-1995. It was the band's first national television performance.

== Other versions ==
- A live version recorded on June 15, 1996, at the Golden Gate Park as part of the Tibetan Freedom Concert was released on the "Free Tibet" DVD.
- Another version recorded at the following year's version of the festival on June 7, 1997, at the Downing Stadium was released on the Tibetan Freedom Concert live album.

== Track listings ==
UK 7-inch single; French and Japanese CD single

1. "This Is a Call"
2. "Winnebago" (Grohl, Turner)

UK 12-inch and CD single

1. "This Is a Call"
2. "Winnebago"
3. "Podunk"

Dutch and Australian CD single; New Zealand cassette single

1. "This Is a Call"
2. "Winnebago"
3. "Podunk (Cement Mix)"
- "Podunk (Cement Mix)" is seemingly the same mix and version as the standard version of "Podunk". The reason for this is unknown.

== Personnel ==
- Dave Grohl – guitars, vocals, bass, drums

== Charts ==
=== Weekly charts ===
Chart (1995)	Peak position
Australia (ARIA)	9
Australia Alternative Singles (ARIA)	1
Canada Top Singles (RPM)	29
Canada Contemporary Hit Radio (The Record)	35
Canada Rock/Alternative (RPM)	1
European Hot 100 Singles (Music & Media)	14
European Hit Radio Top 40 (Music & Media)	37
Iceland (Íslenski Listinn Topp 40)	14
Ireland (IRMA)	16
Netherlands (Dutch Top 40)	38
Netherlands (Single Top 100)	32
New Zealand (Recorded Music NZ)	11
Scottish Singles Sales (Official Charts)	7
UK Singles (Official Charts)	5
US Radio Songs (Billboard)	35
US Alternative Airplay (Billboard)	2
US Mainstream Rock (Billboard)	6

=== Year-end charts ===
Chart (1995)	Position
Australia (ARIA)	95
US Modern Rock Tracks (Billboard)	24

== Certifications ==
Region	Certification	Certified units/sales
Australia (ARIA)	Gold	35,000^{‡}
United Kingdom (BPI) Sales since 2005	Silver	200,000^{‡}
^{‡} Sales+streaming figures based on certification alone.
