= Everlong =

1997 single by Foo Fighters

- European variant of standard artwork

Single by Foo Fighters

from the album The Colour and the Shape
- Released: August 18, 1997
- Recorded: January–February 1997
- Studio: Grandmaster Recorders (Hollywood, California)
- Genre: Alternative rock; post-grunge; hard rock
- Length: 4:10 (album version); 4:49 (video version)
- Label: Roswell; Capitol
- Songwriter: Dave Grohl
- Producer: Gil Norton

Foo Fighters singles chronology
"Monkey Wrench" (1997)	"Everlong" (1997)	"My Hero" (1998)

Audio sample
- file; help

Music video
- "Everlong" on YouTube

"Everlong" is a song by American rock band Foo Fighters, released in August 1997 as the second single from their second studio album, The Colour and the Shape (1997). The song reached number 3 on the US Billboard Alternative Songs chart and the Canadian RPM Rock/Alternative chart. It is often regarded as the band's signature song.

"Everlong" was the last song performed live by drummer Taylor Hawkins before his death in March 2022. As a result of his death, the song experienced a minor resurgence and entered the Billboard Global 200 at number 123, the band's first appearance on the chart. In 2021, Rolling Stone magazine ranked the song number 409 on their list of the 500 Greatest Songs of All Time.

== Production ==
In late 1996, Dave Grohl was lodging at Bear Creek Studios in Woodinville, Washington, recording what was to be the second Foo Fighters album. While playing around with his guitar during downtime between takes of the song "Monkey Wrench" (which is in drop D tuning), he stumbled on a "Sonic Youth rip off" riff, which he felt had the same vibe as one of that band's songs, "Schizophrenia". He took a liking to it and decided to develop it into a song, the band jamming on what became the verse. The song had not progressed beyond this rudimentary draft by the end of those sessions.

Shortly thereafter, around Christmas time, Grohl returned to his residence in Virginia. As he was going through a divorce, he decided to stay at a friend's house, using a sleeping bag on the floor. It was there that he wrote "Everlong" as a proper song, in 45 minutes. The lyrics were inspired by Grohl's ongoing romance with Louise Post of the band Veruca Salt: "That song's about a girl that I'd fallen in love with and it was basically about being connected to someone so much, that not only do you love them physically and spiritually, but when you sing along with them you harmonize perfectly". Grohl recorded a demo of the song soon after, during a visit to a friend's studio in nearby Washington, D.C. He describes the demo, on which he played all the instruments, as being essentially the same as the album version, but "super raw".

Grohl returned to the West Coast to continue work on The Colour and the Shape. He met with producer Gil Norton at Grandmaster Recorders in Hollywood again, and played the "Everlong" demo for him. Norton was impressed. Soon, Nate Mendel and Pat Smear joined Grohl and Norton, and the group recorded the song. The solo guitar intro was recorded through an Astatic JT40 microphone, which outputs "dull" recordings with "no clarity". Grohl wanted Post to provide vocals. She was in Chicago at the time, however, so her parts (doo doo doos alongside the lead guitar riff, and harmonizing on the chorus) were recorded using two separate telephone lines in the studio, one for her monitor, and the other for recording. Grohl recorded his chorus harmonies through the JT40, which provided vocals at a similar level of fidelity as Post's. For the breakdown, Grohl recorded three spoken word tracks, one telling a story from assistant engineer Ryan Boesch's childhood, of being punished for disturbing his father's sleep, and two others of Grohl reading random passages from a book. The three tracks were planned to be blended together, but only the first was used in the final mix.

== Critical reception ==
"Everlong" is widely regarded as one of Foo Fighters' best songs. In 2020, Kerrang ranked the song number one on their list of the 20 greatest Foo Fighters songs, and in 2021, American Songwriter ranked the song number two on their list of the 10 greatest Foo Fighters songs.

"Everlong" reached one billion streams on Spotify on December 2, 2023, the 55th birthday of the Foo Fighters' bassist, Nate Mendel.

== Music video ==
The surreal, satirical video for "Everlong" was directed by Michel Gondry. It is, in part, a parody of the film The Evil Dead. The version of the song used in the video is longer than the single and album versions.

The video opens in black and white, with Smear and Mendel, dressed as Teddy Boys, outside of a house in which Grohl and his wife, played by Taylor Hawkins, are asleep. In Grohl's dream (in color), he is Sid Vicious at a party, and Hawkins, as Nancy Spungen, is being harassed by Smear and Mendel. In Hawkins' dream (also in color), his character is in a cabin reading a book, while Grohl gathers firewood outside. A hand appears from under a trap door in the floor of the cabin. Back in Grohl's dream, he attacks Smear and Mendel with his enlarged hand. He defeats them, and they vaporize (only to materialize in Hawkins' dream). Grohl and Hawkins escape the party into a room with an enormous telephone, which is ringing loudly. Grohl awakens in their bedroom, where their real phone is ringing. Hawkins, trying to fend off Smear and Mendel in his character's dream, phones Grohl. Grohl, in their bedroom, answers the phone, and realizes that Hawkins is in distress in Hawkins' dream. Unable to wake Hawkins, Grohl returns to sleep in order to enter Hawkins' dream and rescue Hawkins. Grohl finds a nunchaku among the logs that he is carrying in Hawkins' dream. He enters the cabin, and he and Hawkins overcome Smear and Mendel again. Grohl throws their bodies in a nearby lake. Smear and Mendel are then shown in Grohl and Hawkins' bedroom. All of the band members cast off their costumes, and the video ends with them performing the rest of the song as themselves.

Although Hawkins is shown drumming in the video, Grohl was actually the drummer on the song, as Hawkins had not yet joined the band at the time of its recording.

"Everlong" was nominated for Best Rock Video at the 1998 MTV Video Music Awards. On May 11, 2021, it passed 200 million views on YouTube.

== Other versions ==
Although the song is normally performed with electric guitars, vocalist/guitarist Dave Grohl's solo acoustic variation gained popularity after an impromptu rendition on Howard Stern's radio show in 1998. The band has performed it acoustically since then and an acoustic performance concludes their 2006 live CD and DVD Skin and Bones. Additionally, an acoustic version was released on Foo Fighters' 2009 Greatest Hits album.

A live version filmed at Hyde Park on June 17, 2006, was released on the Hyde Park DVD.

A live version appears on the Live at Wembley Stadium DVD which was released in 2008.

Eleven-year-old Ipswich musician Nandi Bushell joined Foo Fighters on stage to perform the song during their concert at the Forum in Los Angeles on August 26, 2021. Bushell had gone viral on YouTube in part due to her drum covers, including "Everlong", and her online drum challenge with Grohl in 2020, which drew millions of views before Grohl "conceded" defeat to Bushell. Grohl had offered her the chance to join Foo Fighters during a performance; it was delayed to 2021 due to the COVID-19 pandemic. "Everlong" gained newfound popularity as a result of this performance and appeared on several Billboard charts that did not exist when the song was first released.

== Accolades ==
Critical rankings for "Everlong"
Year	Publication	Accolade	Rank	Ref.
1999	Kerrang!	100 Greatest Rock Tracks Ever	45	
2009	VH1	100 Greatest Hard Rock Songs	28	
2009	Triple J	Hottest 100 of All Time	9	
2010	Robert Dimery	1001 Songs You Must Hear Before You Die	*	
2011	NME	150 Best Tracks of the Past 15 Years	48	
2013	Triple J	Hottest 100 of the Past 20 Years	6	
2013	Rolling Stone	Best Foo Fighters Songs readers' poll	1	
2014	Triple M	Modern Rock 500	1	
2019	The Guardian	Dave Grohl's Landmark Songs	*	
2021	Rolling Stone	500 Best Songs of All Time	409	

* denotes an unordered list.

== Usage in media ==
"Everlong" was used in "Lane Miserables", the eighth episode of the third season of Daria, an animated series on MTV. In the original broadcast, the song played as Daria Morgendorffer watched Trent and Monique leave to go on a date. The episode originally aired on MTV on July 14, 1999.

"Everlong" has been featured in the music video games Rock Band 2, Rock Band Unplugged, Guitar Hero World Tour (which is exportable to other games) and Rocksmith 2014. It is also included in Rock Band for iOS and as a purchasable track in Fortnite Festival.

An arrangement of the song for string quartet was used in the Friends episode "The One with Monica and Chandler's Wedding", during the titular event. It was also used in a 1998 episode of the US daytime soap opera All My Children. The original version of the song was used in Martin Scorsese's 2013 film The Wolf of Wall Street. The song was also used briefly in the movie Little Nicky while Nicky is ascending his girlfriend's apartment building.

The song was used in early workprint versions of David Fincher's 1999 film Fight Club, playing over an unfinished version of the film's title sequence in place of The Dust Brothers' track "Stealing Fat" from the film's original soundtrack, which was used in the final theatrical film. Footage of the unfinished workprint intro sequence featuring "Everlong" has surfaced online.

Comedian and late night talk show host David Letterman has called "Everlong" his favorite song, citing it as having helped him through his recovery from heart surgery in 2000. Foo Fighters were invited to serve as the musical act on the February 21, 2000, episode of Late Show with David Letterman, the first since his surgery, to perform "Everlong." Grohl stated that he was "blown away" after learning that Letterman was a fan of their music. The band went as far as cancelling a stop on a tour in South America so they could perform, explaining that "We just felt like we had to be there. Not only was it an honor to be asked, but it felt like something we had to do – because he had always meant so much to us. And that started this connection that we've had for years. It's fucking cool, you know?" On May 20, 2015, the band returned to perform "Everlong" again, the night of Letterman's final episode. The six-minute-long performance was set to a montage of footage spanning Letterman's career.

In June 2026, the performance on Tiny Desk Concert "Everlong" went audio viral on TikTok and Instagram, the viral was uploaded and published worldwide.

== Track listings ==
UK CD1 (blue cover)

1. "Everlong"
2. "Drive Me Wild" (Vanity 6 cover)
3. "See You" (Live Manchester Apollo May 25, 1997)

UK CD2 (grey cover)

1. "Everlong"
2. "Requiem" (Killing Joke cover)
3. "I'll Stick Around" (Live Manchester Apollo May 25, 1997)

Australian CD single, Australian limited edition maxi-single digipack with bonus poster and Netherlands slimbox CD single

1. "Everlong"
2. "Down in the Park" (Gary Numan cover)
3. "See You" (acoustic)

Netherlands card sleeve CD single

1. "Everlong"
2. "Down in the Park" (Gary Numan cover)

Promo (black cover)

1. "Everlong"

UK Limited Blue Vinyl Edition (blue cover)

1. "Everlong"
2. "Drive Me Wild" (Vanity 6 cover)

== Personnel ==
Foo Fighters

- Dave Grohl – vocals, guitar, drums
- Pat Smear – guitar
- Nate Mendel – bass

Additional personnel

- Louise Post – backing vocals

== Charts ==
=== Weekly charts ===
1997 weekly chart performance for "Everlong"
Chart (1997)	Peak position
Australia (ARIA)	45
Australia Alternative Singles (ARIA)	13
Canada Rock/Alternative (RPM)	3
European Hot 100 Singles (Music & Media)	36
New Zealand (Recorded Music NZ)	34
Scottish Singles Sales (Official Charts)	13
UK Singles (Official Charts)	18
UK Rock & Metal (Official Charts)	2
US Radio Songs (Billboard)	42
US Alternative Airplay (Billboard)	3
US Mainstream Rock Airplay (Billboard)	4

2015 weekly chart performance for "Everlong"
Chart (2015)	Peak position
Ireland (IRMA)	79
US Rock Digital Songs (Billboard)	17

2021 weekly chart performance for "Everlong"
Chart (2021)	Peak position
US Hot Rock & Alternative Songs (Billboard)	18

2022 weekly chart performance for "Everlong"
Chart (2022)	Peak position
Australia (ARIA)	28
Global 200 (Billboard)	123
Ireland (IRMA)	70
New Zealand (Recorded Music NZ)	31
Portugal (AFP)	163
US Hot Rock & Alternative Songs (Billboard)	11
US Hot Hard Rock Songs (Billboard)	1

=== Year-end charts ===
1997 year-end chart performance for "Everlong"
Chart (1997)	Position
US Mainstream Rock (Billboard)	30
US Modern Rock (Billboard)	13

2022 year-end chart performance for "Everlong"
Chart (2022)	Position
US Hot Rock & Alternative Songs (Billboard)	91

2023 year-end chart performance for "Everlong"
Chart (2023)	Position
Australia (ARIA)	70

== Certifications ==
Certifications for "Everlong"
Region	Certification	Certified units/sales
Australia (ARIA)	8× Platinum	560,000^{‡}
Brazil (Pro-Música Brasil)	2× Platinum	120,000^{‡}
Denmark (IFPI Danmark)	Platinum	90,000^{‡}
Germany (BVMI)	Platinum	500,000^{‡}
Italy (FIMI)	Platinum	50,000^{‡}
Mexico (AMPROFON)	Diamond+Gold	330,000^{‡}
New Zealand (RMNZ)	9× Platinum	270,000^{‡}
Portugal (AFP)	3× Platinum	75,000^{‡}
Spain (Promusicae)	Platinum	60,000^{‡}
United Kingdom (BPI)	3× Platinum	1,800,000^{‡}
United States (RIAA)	2× Platinum	2,000,000^{‡}
^{‡} Sales+streaming figures based on certification alone.
