= My Hero (song) =

1997 single by Foo Fighters

- Australian variant of standard artwork

Single by Foo Fighters

from the album The Colour and the Shape
- Released: January 19, 1998
- Recorded: 1997
- Studio: Grandmaster Recorders (Hollywood, California)
- Genre: Post-grunge; alternative rock; arena rock
- Length: 4:20
- Label: Roswell; Capitol
- Songwriters: Dave Grohl; Pat Smear; Nate Mendel
- Producer: Gil Norton

Foo Fighters singles chronology
"Everlong" (1997)	"My Hero" (1998)	"Walking After You" (1998)

Music video
- "My Hero" on YouTube

"My Hero" is a song by American rock band Foo Fighters. It was released in January 1998 as the third single from their second studio album, The Colour and the Shape (1997). Lead vocalist and song co-writer Dave Grohl described the song as a tribute to "ordinary heroes."

The song peaked at number six on the US Billboard Alternative Songs chart, and is considered a Foo Fighters classic and a staple at the band's concerts.

== Background ==
Although the song was first released on The Colour and the Shape album in 1997, it was played live for the first time with different lyrics in 1995. On July 17, 1995, Grohl demoed the hit song for the first time by himself on an 8-track reel-to-reel in the basement of his Seattle home. The demo features Grohl singing and playing drums, bass, and guitars. Although the lyrics are not complete, the vocal melody is the same as the melody of the final studio recording of the song. In the Foo Fighters 2011 documentary Foo Fighters: Back and Forth, bassist Nate Mendel states he knew the band had a future when he heard Grohl’s demo of "My Hero" “because the song was great”.

In a 1999 interview, Grohl said that the song is "about heroes that are ordinary" and added that he looks up to everyday people more than he looks up to celebrities. During Foo Fighters' appearance on VH1 Storytellers in 2009, Grohl explained that the song was written while watching 1980s movies like Valley Girl. Grohl also stated that the band wrote the song about Pete Stahl and Chip Donaldson without even knowing it.

The recording of the song was done using two different drum tracks played back simultaneously for the introduction and choruses.

== Music video ==
The music video for "My Hero" was directed by Dave Grohl. It features a man running into a burning building to rescue a woman's baby, another woman's dog, and finally a framed picture of the first woman (which is the baby's mother). The eyes of both the baby and the dog are blocked out. The camera follows the man throughout the video, with his face never being shown. It is presented in a continuous "long take" format, although actual transitional cuts are disguised by smoke. During shots inside the building, the band is seen performing the song, seemingly unconcerned about the chaos around them. Despite not playing on the recording, guitarist Franz Stahl appears in the video, as by this point Pat Smear had left the band.

== Critical reception ==
"My Hero" was ranked by Entertainment Weekly as Foo Fighters' 14th-greatest song, was ranked by Kerrang as Foo Fighters' seventh-greatest song, was ranked by American Songwriter as the greatest Foo Fighters song, and was ranked by Rolling Stone readers as Foo Fighters' fourth-greatest song.

== Objection to use in political campaigns ==
In 2008, the band criticized the campaign of Republican presidential candidate John McCain for using the song at rallies without their permission. Foo Fighters responded to the incident, saying:

"It's frustrating and infuriating that someone who claims to speak for the American people would repeatedly show such little respect for creativity and intellectual property... The saddest thing about this is that 'My Hero' was written as a celebration of the common man and his extraordinary potential. To have it appropriated without our knowledge and used in a manner that perverts the original sentiment of the lyric just tarnishes the song."

The McCain campaign asserted that the song was used properly under blanket licensing (which does not require the artist's permission), and all proper royalties were paid.

The band played a stripped-down, acoustic version of the song during an appearance at the end of the 2012 Democratic National Convention, in which McCain's 2008 opponent, Barack Obama, secured the presidential nomination.

Foo Fighters also objected to Donald Trump's use of the song at a rally for his 2024 presidential campaign in Glendale, Arizona, going so far as to state they would give Trump's opponent Kamala Harris any royalties received from its usage.

== Other versions ==
On September 3, 2022, Foo Fighters played a tribute concert to their late drummer, Taylor Hawkins, at Wembley Stadium. During that concert, the band played "My Hero" with Hawkins' son Shane on drums. Video of the performance went viral, and the performance nabbed Shane a Drumeo Award for Drum Performance of the Year. According to Far Out, Shane Hawkins' drumming style was "uncannily similar" to that of his father, and the "powerhouse performance of 'My Hero' will go down as one of the stadium's most emotionally charged songs ever witnessed".

== Track listings ==
=== UK single ===
1. "My Hero" - 4:21
2. "Baker Street" (Gerry Rafferty cover) - 5:39
3. "Dear Lover" - 4:34
4. Enhanced section Containing:
  - Everlong [Video]
  - Monkey Wrench [30sec Clip]
  - My Hero [Song File Format]

=== Japan special edition maxi single ===
1. "My Hero"
2. "Requiem" (Killing Joke cover)
3. "Drive Me Wild" (Vanity 6 cover)
4. "Down in the Park" (Gary Numan cover)
5. "Baker Street" (Gerry Rafferty cover)
6. "See You" (acoustic)
7. "For All the Cows" (Live at Toshiba-EMI Ltd on 2 April 1997 in Japan)

=== Australian single ===
1. "My Hero"
2. "Dear Lover"
3. "For All the Cows" (Live at Toshiba-EMI Ltd on 2 April 1997 in Japan)

== Personnel ==
- Dave Grohl – vocals, guitar, drums
- Pat Smear – guitar
- Nate Mendel – bass

== Charts ==
=== Weekly charts ===
Chart (1998)	Peak position
Australia (ARIA)	74
European Hot 100 Singles (Music & Media)	53
Scottish Singles Sales (Official Charts)	19
UK Singles (Official Charts)	21
US Radio Songs (Billboard)	59
US Alternative Airplay (Billboard)	6
US Mainstream Rock Airplay (Billboard)	8

Chart (2020)	Peak position
US Hot Rock & Alternative Songs (Billboard)	18

Chart (2022)	Peak position
US Hot Hard Rock Songs (Billboard)	2
US Hot Alternative Songs (Billboard)	14

Live version

Chart (2006)	Peak position
Canada Rock (Billboard)	42

=== Year-end charts ===
Chart (1998)	Position
US Mainstream Rock (Billboard)	15
US Modern Rock (Billboard)	18

== Certifications ==
Region	Certification	Certified units/sales
Australia (ARIA)	3× Platinum	210,000^{‡}
Brazil (Pro-Música Brasil)	Gold	30,000^{‡}
Mexico (AMPROFON)	Gold	30,000^{‡}
New Zealand (RMNZ)	3× Platinum	90,000^{‡}
United Kingdom (BPI)	Platinum	600,000^{‡}
^{‡} Sales+streaming figures based on certification alone.
