= Big Me =

Single by Foo Fighters

from the album Foo Fighters
- Released: March 25, 1996
- Recorded: 1994–1995
- Studio: Robert Lang, Seattle
- Genre: Alternative rock; power pop; pop rock; jangle pop
- Length: 2:13
- Label: Roswell/Capitol
- Songwriter: Dave Grohl
- Producers: Barrett Jones; Dave Grohl

Foo Fighters singles chronology
"For All the Cows" (1995)	"Big Me" (1996)	"Alone + Easy Target" (1996)

Music video
- "Big Me" on YouTube

"Big Me" is the fourth single by Foo Fighters from their self-titled debut album (1995). Released in March 1996, the song became a crossover hit for the band on pop radio, when it reached No. 13 on the Billboard Hot 100 Airplay.

== Background ==
"Big Me" was written and performed entirely by Dave Grohl, who at the time was the sole member of Foo Fighters. The song originated during Grohl's time with Nirvana, and was played during their final studio session, which also produced the band's last recorded song, "You Know You're Right". A version of "Big Me" from this era was later released on the Foo Fighters EP Songs from the Laundry Room.

== Music video ==
The song became well known for its music video, which parodies Mentos advertisements, turning them into commercials for "Footos," with the "Freshmaker" slogan being rendered as "The Fresh Fighter". The concept came from director Jesse Peretz, who had originally pitched the idea to another band, and the Foo Fighters accepted the concept because, according to Dave Grohl, "We had some difficulty finding a treatment that would suit the song, which is this short, tongue-in-cheek, ridiculously candy-coated pop tune. We didn't want to make this big, pretentious portrait video. We wanted to make fun of ourselves and the song." The video was filmed entirely on location in the Sydney Central Business District, McMahons Point, Kirribilli, and North Sydney, New South Wales, Australia. It debuted on MTV on February 14, 1996, and quickly became a Buzz Bin clip. It was eventually nominated for 5 MTV Video Music Awards at the 1996 MTV Video Music Awards, winning only "Best Group Video".

The video's success led to many fans throwing Mentos at the band whenever they played the song live. For an extended period of time, the band did not play the song live due to this, as Grohl cited: "We did stop playing that song for a while because, honestly, it's like being stoned. Those little … things are like pebbles – they hurt." The band only started to change its mind after Weezer started performing "Big Me" during the Foozer tour both bands did together.

== Release ==
In the US, "Big Me" was released as a 7-track maxi single making it ineligible for the Billboard Hot 100 singles chart because it had more than four songs, but having sold more than 5,000 copies it should have charted at number 175 on the Billboard 200 album chart but was not included on the chart due to a production error.

The "Big Me" single was re-released on a 3-inch vinyl for Record Store Day on April 13, 2019. The single is one of several 3-inch Record Store Day re-issues that is playable on special miniature record players.

== Singles ==
CD single

1. "Big Me"
2. "Floaty (BBC Evening Session Recording 23 November 1995)"
3. "Gas Chamber (BBC Evening Session Recording 23 November 1995)" (Angry Samoans cover)
4. "Alone + Easy Target (BBC Evening Session Recording 23 November 1995)"

7" White Vinyl

1. "Big Me"
2. "Floaty (BBC Evening Sessions Recording 23 November 1995)
3. "Gas Chamber (BBC Evening Sessions Recording 23 November 1995) (Angry Samoans cover)

Maxi CD single

1. "Big Me"
2. "Winnebago"
3. "How I Miss You" (features Dave Grohl's sister Lisa on bass and Mike Nelson on drums)
4. "Podunk"
5. "Ozone" (Ace Frehley cover)
6. "For All the Cows" (live at the Reading Festival, August 26, 1995)
7. "Wattershed" (live at the Reading Festival, August 26, 1995)

3” Record Store Day 2019 Exclusive Single

1. “Big Me”

== Charts ==
=== Weekly charts ===
Chart (1996)	Peak position
Australia (ARIA)	65
Australia Alternative Singles (ARIA)	17
Canada Top Singles (RPM)	15
Canada Hit Parade (The Record)	16
Canada Contemporary Hit Radio (The Record)	18
Canada Rock/Alternative (RPM)	5
European Hot 100 Singles (Music & Media)	58
European Hit Radio Top 40 (Music & Media)	27
Iceland (Íslenski Listinn Topp 40)	18
Ireland (IRMA)	27
Quebec Airplay (ADISQ)	25
UK Singles (Official Charts)	19
UK Rock & Metal (Official Charts)	1
US Radio Songs (Billboard)	13
US Adult Alternative Airplay (Billboard)	9
US Alternative Airplay (Billboard)	3
US Adult Pop Airplay (Billboard)	23
US Pop Airplay (Billboard)	11
US Mainstream Rock (Billboard)	18

=== Year-end charts ===
Chart (1996)	Peak position
US Alternative (Radio & Records)	14
US Modern Rock (Billboard)	17
US Mainstream Top 40 (Billboard)	63
US Mainstream Rock (Billboard)	79

== Certifications ==
Region	Certification	Certified units/sales
Australia (ARIA)	Gold	35,000^{‡}
New Zealand (RMNZ)	Gold	15,000^{‡}
United Kingdom (BPI) Sales since 2005	Silver	200,000^{‡}
^{‡} Sales+streaming figures based on certification alone.

== Awards ==
Year	Award	Results
1996	MTV Award for Best Group Video	Won
