= Foo Fighters (album) =

1995 studio album by Foo Fighters

Studio album by Foo Fighters
- Released: June 26, 1995
- Recorded: October 17–23, 1994
- Studio: Robert Lang (Shoreline, Washington)
- Genres: Punk rock; grunge; alternative rock; melodic hardcore; post-grunge
- Length: 44:04
- Labels: Roswell; Capitol
- Producers: Dave Grohl; Barrett Jones

Foo Fighters chronology
Foo Fighters (1995)	The Colour and the Shape (1997)

Singles from Foo Fighters
- 1. "This Is a Call" Released: June 19, 1995; 2. "I'll Stick Around" Released: September 4, 1995; 3. "For All the Cows" Released: November 20, 1995; 4. "Big Me" Released: March 25, 1996

Foo Fighters is the debut studio album by American rock band Foo Fighters, released on June 26, 1995, through Roswell and Capitol Records in the United Kingdom and on July 4, 1995 in the United States. Former Nirvana drummer Dave Grohl wrote the entire album. He recorded it himself in six days with the assistance of producer Barrett Jones at Robert Lang Studios in Seattle, Washington, in October 1994.

Grohl said that he recorded the album just for fun, describing it as a cathartic experience to recover from the suicide of Nirvana bandmate Kurt Cobain in 1994. The album, featuring more traditional rock stylings than what was typical in grunge, is considered to have established the post-grunge genre.

After Grohl completed the recordings, he passed cassette copies of the sessions to personal friends, using the name "Foo Fighters" to conceal his involvement. When the tapes attracted record label interest, Grohl signed with Capitol and formed a backing band to perform the songs live. The album was promoted through extensive tours and four singles, two of which were accompanied by music videos.

Upon its release, Foo Fighters earned critical acclaim, with reviewers praising its songwriting and performances, and was also a commercial success, becoming the band's second-best-selling album in the United States. It also peaked within the top five of charts of the United Kingdom, Canada, Australia, and New Zealand.

== Background ==
In 1990, Dave Grohl joined the grunge band Nirvana as drummer. During tours, he took a guitar with him and wrote songs, but was too intimidated to share them with the band, as he was "in awe" of the songs written by frontman Kurt Cobain. Grohl occasionally booked studio time to record demos and covers, issuing an album of demos, Pocketwatch, under the pseudonym Late! in 1992.

Following Cobain's suicide in April 1994, Grohl entered a state of depression, and found it difficult to both listen to music and play instruments. He was uncertain of what to do next, and despite being invited to drum for bands like Danzig or Tom Petty and the Heartbreakers, Grohl almost decided to abandon his musical career: "I just couldn't imagine [playing in other bands]", he explained in a 2005 interview with Classic Rock magazine, "because it would just remind me of being in Nirvana; every time I sat down at a drum set, I would think of that."

Grohl's first musical performance after the demise of Nirvana was with The Backbeat Band at the 1994 MTV Movie Awards in June. Soon thereafter, Mike Watt invited Grohl to play drums on his album Ball-Hog or Tugboat? (1995). Grohl enjoyed these experiences and thus decided to work on his own musical project, which he believed could serve as "some sort of cathartic therapy". Grohl consequently booked six days at Seattle's Robert Lang Studios, which were located near his house, where he recorded several of his favorite personal compositions with the assistance of Pocketwatch producer Barrett Jones. Although Grohl played all the instruments on the album, he intended to release it under a name that would make people believe it to be the work of a full band, similar to Stewart Copeland's 1980 EP Klark Kent.

== Recording ==
"The first Foo Fighters record was not meant to be an album, it was an experiment and for fun. I was just fucking around. Some of the lyrics weren't even real words."

— Dave Grohl in 2011

Grohl and Jones produced the record across a period of one week in October 1994, with Grohl on vocals and all instruments. Both would arrive in the morning at Robert Lang Studios, start production by noon and do four songs a day. According to Grohl, during the recording process he would run from room to room, "still sweating and shaking from playing drums and [then] pick up the guitar and put down a track, do the bass, maybe another guitar part, have a sip of coffee and then go in and do the next song". The only performance by an outsider was a guitar part on "X-Static" provided by Greg Dulli of The Afghan Whigs, who was watching Grohl record the songs. Grohl eventually asked him if he wanted to play and handed him a guitar. Each song took about 45 minutes to be completed, and the compositions were recorded in the same order that became the album's track listing. The only song that required two run-throughs before completion was "I'll Stick Around". Grohl was insecure about his singing, and added effects to his voice in "Floaty", and tried to enhance the performance through double track – "You know how people double their vocals to make them stronger? That album the vocals are quadrupled."

In an attempt to keep his anonymity, Grohl planned to release the songs under the name Foo Fighters, a name he took from a ufology book he was reading at the time, Above Top Secret, that in a chapter described the "foo fighter" phenomena. It would be a very low-key release, with only 100 LP records being pressed after the sessions were finished. Grohl also went to a cassette duplication lab in Seattle and created 100 cassette copies of the session and started handing them to friends for feedback and "I'd give tapes to everybody. Kids would come up to me and say 'Nirvana was my favourite band' and I'd say 'well here, have this'". Eddie Vedder premiered two songs from the recording on January 8, 1995, during his Self-Pollution radio broadcast. The recordings quickly circulated amongst the music industry, which in turn created record label interest. A deal was eventually signed to Capitol Records, as president Gary Gersh was a personal friend of Grohl ever since he worked on Nirvana's label Geffen Records.

The mixing sessions of the album began in Robert Lang Studios (which were used on the 100 tapes Grohl gave away) but eventually those mixes were discarded and the sessions moved to Rob Schnapf and Tom Rothrock's "The Shop" studio in Arcata, California. Mixes were done on a 32 channel API DeMedio console, custom built by Frank DeMedio in 1972 for Wally Heider Recording's 'Studio 4'. A Stephen's 24 track 2" tape machine was used for playback. Processors used in the mixes included an Eventide Omnipressor compressor for vocals and guitar solos, an Alan Smart stereo compressor for "squashing" the drums and mixing them back in as well as being used over the entire mix. Other processors included UREI 1176 and LA3A compressors as well as an Echoplex for delays and a "crappy digital reverb". Mixes were "nothing that crazy" Rob described, adding that he "mixed 'Big Me' in 20 minutes".

During the sessions, Grohl was invited by Tom Petty to perform with The Heartbreakers on Saturday Night Live one month later. The performance was followed by an invitation to be a full-time member of the Heartbreakers, but once Petty heard about the Foo Fighters, he instead encouraged Grohl to move on with this solo project. Grohl soon recruited a full band, which included bassist Nate Mendel and drummer William Goldsmith of the recently disbanded Sunny Day Real Estate, as well as Nirvana touring guitarist, and former Germs member, Pat Smear.

== Music and composition ==
"I'll Stick Around"
Sample of "I'll Stick Around", the album's second single. Dave Grohl described it as "a very negative song about feeling you were violated or deprived" and considered "it the strongest song I've ever written, because it was the one song that I actually meant and felt emotionally."

Nine of the songs in the album were composed before or during Grohl's tenure with Nirvana, and existed in demos created by Grohl on his home 8-track tape recorder. The only compositions done after Cobain's death were "This Is a Call", "I'll Stick Around", "X-Static" and "Wattershed". The album's sound has been primarily described as punk rock, grunge, alternative rock, melodic hardcore, and post-grunge. Stephen Thomas Erlewine of AllMusic stated that the album was a "handful of punk-pop gems that show, given the right musicians and songwriters, the genre had not entirely become a cliché by the middle of the '90s." The music mostly followed a hard rock sound with the soft-loud dynamics seen in Nirvana tracks such as "Smells Like Teen Spirit" and "Heart-Shaped Box". Variants include the melancholic "Exhausted", which Grohl defined as a song that's "sad but makes you feel good".

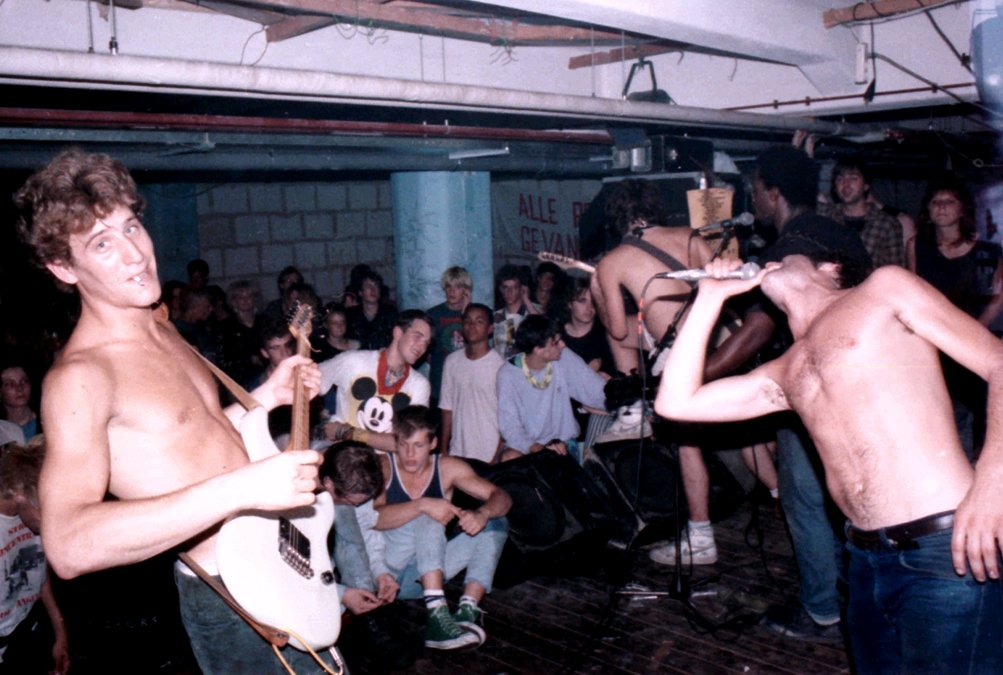
Grohl took inspiration from the D.C. hardcore scene he was part of during his time in the band Scream (pictured circa 1986).

Most of the lyrics on Foo Fighters are nonsensical lines written by Grohl in the 20 minutes before recording began. As Grohl later explained, "I had seven days to record fifteen songs. I was just concentrating on everything being as together as possible, having everything be tight and in sync. There wasn't too much time spent sitting in a chair thinking." Grohl would add that the gibberish was deliberate, given that "there was too much to say" following Cobain's death and "a lot of emphasis [was] placed on the meaning of the first Foo Fighters album." Grohl still considered that "the things you write down spur of the moment are most revealing. Now I look at them and some of them seem to actually have meaning", and revealed that a few songs have lyrics inspired by "personal experiences of the last four or five years", with the standout being "Big Me", an "out-and-out love song" to Grohl's then-wife Jennifer Youngblood that he described as his favorite track on the album. Contrasting with the aggressive and rebellious themes of Nirvana, Grohl had positive and cheery tunes such as "This Is a Call", defined as "a 'hello' and a 'thank you'" to everyone that had played a key role in Grohl's life; the playful "For All the Cows"; and "Wattershed", with a title referencing Mike Watt and lyrics that described Grohl's "love of hardcore and old school punk rock".

== Title and packaging ==
The name "Foo Fighters" was taken from the description World War II aircraft pilots would use to describe various UFOs. This science fiction theme is further continued with the name of Grohl's Capitol Records imprint, Roswell Records, a reference to the city of Roswell, New Mexico, known for the Roswell UFO incident of 1947; and the album cover done by Grohl's then-wife, photographer Jennifer Youngblood, featuring a Buck Rogers XZ-38 Disintegrator Pistol. Some reviewers considered the gun on the cover insensitive, given Kurt Cobain died by shooting himself, but Grohl dutifully disregarded it as just a coincidence. Goldsmith later explained, "It was all pretty much based on the whole Foo Fighters thing—Roswell, the space stuff, an antique Buck Rogers raygun. It's really a completely separate thing. Dave wasn't even conscious of that." Despite Grohl being the album's only contributor, at Capitol's insistence the liner notes included a picture of the full band that Grohl had recruited.

== Release and promotion ==
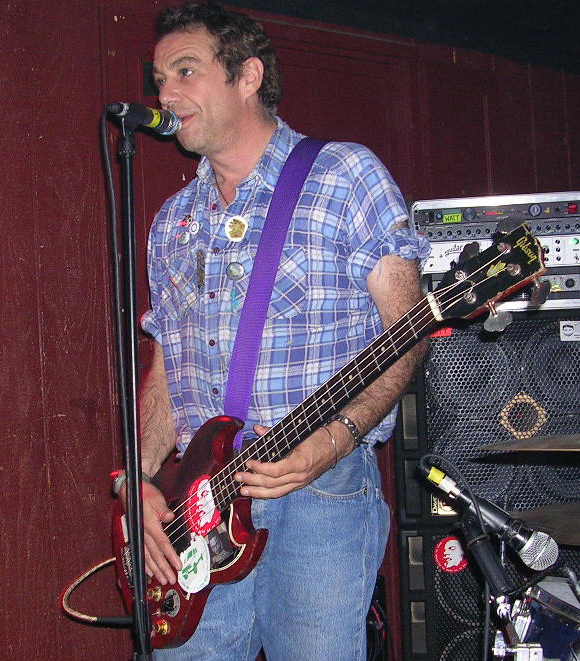
The Foo Fighters' first tour was as a supporting act for Mike Watt (pictured in 2004), ex-bassist of the punk rock band Minutemen in early 1995.

In spring 1995, Foo Fighters embarked on their first ever United States tour, supporting Mike Watt on his Ring Spiel Tour along with fellow tour newbies Hovercraft, whose line-up included Vedder at the time. As well as performing with their own bands, Grohl and Vedder each picked up a role as a member of Watt's backing band throughout the tour, supplying drums and guitar respectively. In May 1995, radio stations KROQ-FM and KNDD started playing some tracks of the then-unreleased album before receiving a cease-and-desist from Capitol. That June, "Exhausted" and "This Is a Call" were sent to college and modern rock radio stations. One week later, "This Is a Call" became the band's first commercial single.

Foo Fighters was released June 26, 1995, on Roswell Records, distributed by Capitol Records. The band promoted the release that summer by completing another US tour with Wool and Shudder to Think, with 25 concerts in little over a month. Foo Fighters also made their network television debut on the Late Show with David Letterman on August 14, performing "This Is a Call". Afterwards, the band played several of their largest shows up to that point, making their debut on the European festival circuit with performances at Pukkelpop, Reading and Lowlands.

"I'll Stick Around" was issued as the second single on September 4, 1995, and would also mark Foo Fighters' music video debut, directed by Gerald Casale. That fall, the band continued to tour extensively, with a European tour with Built to Spill, and visits to Japan, Australia and New Zealand. The tour was wrapped with a performance at the Phoenix Festival on July 20, 1996. The Foo Fighters performed nearly 100 concerts throughout 1995, and over 70 dates the following year.

Two more songs from the album were issued as singles: "For All the Cows" in 1995, and "Big Me" in 1996. Additionally, "Alone + Easy Target" was released as promotional single in 1996. "Big Me" was the band's first commercial single to be made available in the US; it was also the second song on the album to receive a music video. Directed by Jesse Peretz, the music video parodies the distinctive commercials used to advertise Mentos candy.

== Critical reception ==
Professional ratings
Review scores
Source	Rating
AllMusic	4/5 stars
Blender	5/5 stars
Chicago Tribune	3.5/4 stars
Entertainment Weekly	B+
The Guardian	4/5 stars
NME	9/10
Q	3/5 stars
Rolling Stone	4/5 stars
The Rolling Stone Album Guide	4/5 stars
Spin	7/10

Upon its release, the album earned acclaim from critics, many of whom compared it to Nirvana. Reviewer David Browne of Entertainment Weekly considered that "[Grohl's] songs pack the riffy wallop of unpolished Nirvana demos, and his voice has Kurt Cobain's lunging, over-the-top passion." Writing for Spin, Terri Sutton stylistically compared the album to Nirvana's second album, Nevermind, saying that "the album's first half [...] owes much to Nevermind, and it's tempting to hear it in the way Nevermind taught us to hear." Paul Rees of Kerrang! admitted that "Foo Fighters cannot fail to evoke Kurt Cobain's memory, whether if through Grohl's ragged howl of a voice or the way a number of its songs go soft-soft-loud", but ultimately considered the record "more than strong enough to stand or fall in its own merits". Billboard complimented the "inspired songwriting and passionate performances", adding the album could please grunge fans and "also remind fans of other rock and punk taste makers, from Green Day and the Offspring to Better than Ezra."

The album received minor criticism for its lack of intensity, which many proposed was because Grohl played all the instruments himself. AllMusic reviewer Stephen Thomas Erlewine wrote, "Since he recorded the album by himself, they aren't as powerful as most band's primal sonic workouts, but the results are damn impressive for a solo musician." Rolling Stone's Alex Foege described the record as a "remarkable yet coolly understated solo debut" and felt that "the album's only disappointment is that despite its home-studio feel, it ultimately reveals little about its creator." New York described both the overall melodies and Grohl's singing as derivative of the grunge sound, but praised the "tight Beatlesesque harmonies" and lyrics that "key into the more poetic moments of dudespeak." Robert Christgau wrote in The Village Voice that the band shows "spirit" but lacks an "identity" and cited the songs "Big Me" and "This Is a Call" as highlights. He later rated the album a three-star honorable mention in his Consumer Guide book, indicating "an enjoyable effort consumers attuned to its overriding aesthetic or individual vision may well treasure".

The album was nominated for Best Alternative Music Album at the 1996 Grammy Awards ceremony, but lost to MTV Unplugged in New York, an album by Grohl's former band Nirvana. Kerrang! named Foo Fighters the best album of the year, and Rolling Stone put it second on their list, behind PJ Harvey's To Bring You My Love. It also ranked sixth on the Village Voice's Pazz & Jop poll, and 20th on Spin's list.

== Commercial performance ==
Foo Fighters was a commercial success. In the United States, it debuted on the Billboard 200 at number 23, with first-week sales of 40,000 units. The album debuted at number 2 in New Zealand's album chart, number 3 in the UK Albums Chart, where it was the highest new entry of the week, and number 5 on Australia's ARIA Charts. It also peaked at number 5 on the Canadian Albums Chart. By December, it had reached 900,000 units domestically and 2 million worldwide. On September 27, 1995, the album was certified Gold by the Recording Industry Association of America (RIAA), being later certified Platinum on January 26, 1996. By 2011, Foo Fighters had sold 1.468 million units in North America, being the second most successful release of the band behind follow-up The Colour and the Shape. It was also certified Platinum in both Canada and the United Kingdom.

== Track listing ==
All tracks are written by Dave Grohl.

No.	Title	Length
1.	"This Is a Call"	3:53
2.	"I'll Stick Around"	3:52
3.	"Big Me"	2:12
4.	"Alone + Easy Target"	4:06
5.	"Good Grief"	4:01
6.	"Floaty"	4:30
7.	"Weenie Beenie"	2:46
8.	"Oh, George"	3:00
9.	"For All the Cows"	3:30
10.	"X-Static"	4:14
11.	"Wattershed"	2:15
12.	"Exhausted"	5:45
Total length:		44:04

Japanese edition bonus tracks (normal version and 2007 reissued mini-LP version)
No.	Title	Writer(s)	Length
13.	"Winnebago"	Grohl, Geoff Turner	4:13
14.	"Podunk"		3:04
Total length:			51:21

US No. 1 Limited Bonus Pack bonus disc
No.	Title	Writer(s)	Length
1.	"Winnebago"	Grohl, Turner	4:13
2.	"Podunk"		3:04
3.	"How I Miss You"		4:54
4.	"Ozone" (Ace Frehley cover)	Frehley	4:16
Total length:			16:27

Special Oz Tour Edition bonus disc
No.	Title	Writer(s)	Length
1.	"Winnebago"	Grohl, Turner	4:13
2.	"Podunk"		3:04
3.	"How I Miss You"		4:54
4.	"Ozone" (Ace Frehley cover)	Frehley	4:16
5.	"For All the Cows" (Live at Reading Festival 26 August 1995)		3:33
6.	"Wattershed" (Live at Reading Festival 26 August 1995)		2:15
Total length:			22:15

- The album was reissued in 2003 (on CD) and 2011 (as an LP and for download) with the normal track list.

== Personnel ==
Foo Fighters

- Dave Grohl – vocals, guitars, bass guitar, drums

Additional musician

- Greg Dulli – additional guitar on "X-Static"

Technical

- Jaq Chartier – jacket artwork
- Steve Culp – engineering
- Curt Doughty – photography
- Tim Gabor – art direction, album design
- Barrett Jones – production
- Stephen Marcussen – mastering
- Charles Peterson – photography
- Jeff Ross – photography
- Tom Rothrock – mixing
- Rob Schnapf – mixing
- Jennifer Youngblood – cover photo, photography

== Charts ==
=== Weekly charts ===
Weekly chart performance
Chart (1995)	Peak position
Australian Albums (ARIA)	3
Australian Alternative Albums (ARIA)	1
Austrian Albums (Ö3 Austria)	13
Belgian Albums (Ultratop Flanders)	23
Belgian Albums (Ultratop Wallonia)	16
Canada Top Albums/CDs (RPM)	5
Dutch Albums (Album Top 100)	22
European Top 100 Albums (Music & Media)	10
Finnish Albums (Suomen virallinen lista)	21
German Albums (Offizielle Top 100)	33
New Zealand Albums (RMNZ)	2
Scottish Albums (Official Charts)	8
Swedish Albums (Sverigetopplistan)	18
Swiss Albums (Schweizer Hitparade)	26
UK Albums (Official Charts)	3
UK Rock & Metal Albums (Official Charts)	2
US Billboard 200	23

=== Year-end charts ===
Year-end chart performance
Chart (1995)	Position
Canada Top Albums/CDs (RPM)	37
European Top 100 Albums (Music & Media)	80
New Zealand Albums (RMNZ)	41
UK Albums (OCC)	86
US Billboard 200	135

Chart (1996)	Position
US Billboard 200	124

== Certifications ==
Certifications for Foo Fighters
Region	Certification	Certified units/sales
Australia (ARIA)	Gold	35,000^{^}
Canada (Music Canada)	Platinum	100,000^{^}
Malaysia	Platinum	25,000
New Zealand (RMNZ)	Gold	7,500^{^}
United Kingdom (BPI)	Platinum	374,187
United States (RIAA)	Platinum	1,000,000^{^}
^{^} Shipments figures based on certification alone.
