= Robert Lang Studios =

Music recording studio in Shoreline, Washington, US

Coordinates: 47°46′12″N 122°23′10″W

- Founded: 1974
- Headquarters: Shoreline, Washington, U.S.
- Services: Recording studio; Academy
- Owner: Robert Lang
- Website: robertlangstudios.com

Robert Lang Studios is a recording studio in Shoreline, Washington, United States. Numerous bands have recorded at Robert Lang Studios since 1974 including Nirvana, Alice in Chains, Foo Fighters, Soundgarden, Dave Matthews Band, Death Cab for Cutie, Heart, Sir Mix-A-Lot, Peter Frampton, Candlebox, and Bush.

== History ==
Robert Lang quit his job as a Boeing hydrofoil TIG welder to pursue a career in recording, first establishing the studio in 1974 in the garage of a beach house in Shoreline, Washington, near Seattle. The studio remained garage-based for the first seven years, with early projects including Seattle's Franklin High School jazz lab, which included a 15 year-old saxophonist by the name of Kenneth Gorelick (who would later achieve fame as Kenny G), as well as Albert Collins.

In 1982, Lang purchased the property. He began gradually excavating the earth beneath the house over the course of the next several years to create new subterranean reinforced concrete rooms for the studio. In April 1992, Candlebox recorded two songs that would be included on their debut album at Robert Lang Studios, including their hit song "Far Behind" In 1993, 11 years after construction began, the studio's new live room, complete with marble and granite floors and natural stone walls, was finally finished.

In late January 1994, Nirvana recorded their last known studio recording, "You Know You're Right" at Robert Lang Studios. In October of the same year, Dave Grohl, formerly of Nirvana, booked the studio, which was close to his house, for six days, for his own musical project. The resulting album was the self-titled debut album that resulted in Grohl's forming Foo Fighters.

In October 1998, frontman Layne Staley recorded vocals for two new Alice In Chains songs, "Get Born Again" and "Died". The songs, which were released on the Music Bank box set in 1999, would be the last the singer would record with the band.

In 2006 Peter Frampton recorded the track "Blowin' Smoke" with Pearl Jam drummer Matt Cameron and guitarist Mike McCready for his album Fingerprints. In 2008, Death Cab for Cutie recorded their highest-charting album, Narrow Stairs at the studio.

In 2014 Foo Fighters and Death Cab for Cutie's Ben Gibbard returned to Robert Lang Studios for episode 7 of the HBO rockumentary mini-series Foo Fighters Sonic Highways. During the episode, Foo Fighters and Gibbard recorded the song "Subterranean".

Artists recording at Robert Lang Studios have included Heart, Sir Mix-A-Lot, Alice In Chains, Dave Matthews, Bush, Brandi Carlile, Queensrÿche, Train, Portugal. The Man, and The Blood Brothers.

== Selected albums recorded at Robert Lang Studios ==
- Sir Mix-a-Lot - Seminar (1989)
- Michael Gettel - Skywatching (1993)
- Foo Fighters - Foo Fighters (1994)
- Pretty Girls Make Graves - Good Health (2001)
- Mastodon - Leviathan (2004)
- Death Cab for Cutie - Narrow Stairs (2008)
- Hockey Dad - Blend Inn (2018)
