= Roswell Records =

American record label

- Company type: Record label
- Genre: Rock, punk rock, post-grunge
- Founded: 1995
- Founder: Dave Grohl (president)
- Headquarters: New York City, U.S.

Roswell Records is an American record label founded by Dave Grohl in 1995 for his band Foo Fighters. It is currently an imprint of RCA Records and is based in New York City.

== History ==
=== Capitol Records (1995–1999) ===
The label was originally set up by Capitol Records as a holding company to retain the rights to Grohl's post-Nirvana music, its name a reference to the Roswell incident. Roswell's first release was the Foo Fighters' self-titled debut album in 1995. The gun on the album's cover is partly intended as a reference to the outer space theme associated with the names of both Roswell Records and the Foo Fighters.

=== RCA Records (1999–present) ===
In July 1999, both Foo Fighters and Roswell left Capitol and signed with RCA Records at the height of the band's popularity. It was one of the most high-profile artist signings of the year and shifted the distribution rights of Foo Fighters-owned media from Capitol to RCA for their next studio album, There Is Nothing Left to Lose (1999). Since then, every Foo Fighters album released under the Roswell label has been distributed by RCA.

== Roswell Films ==
Roswell Films
- Company type: Film; Television
- Founded: 2012
- Founder: Dave Grohl (president)
- Headquarters: New York City, United States

In 2012, the imprint formed the film subsidiary Roswell Films, which co-produced and co-distributed Grohl's directorial debut documentary film Sound City (2013). The film discusses the historic importance of Sound City Studios and its Neve 8028 console to the world of rock music, along with other recording genres. Sound City debuted on January 18, 2013, to overwhelmingly positive reviews with a 100% on Rotten Tomatoes. After the success of Sound City, Grohl expressed interest to Billboard of doing another production. According to Grohl,

After making Sound City, I realized that the pairing of music and documentary works well because the stories give substance and depth to the song, which makes for a stronger emotional connection. So I thought, ‘I want to do this again, but instead of just walking into a studio and telling its story, I want to travel across America and tell its story.

On May 15, 2014, it was announced that the Foo Fighters' eighth album would be released in the fall of 2014, and that the band would commemorate the album and their 20th anniversary with a television miniseries. Each song on the new album was recorded in a different city, featuring "local legends" on each song and lyrics inspired by the "experiences, interviews and personalities that became part of the process." It was later announced the series to be titled, Foo Fighters: Sonic Highways and was set to broadcast on HBO on October 17, 2014. With each of the eight episodes is presented as an exploration of the musical history of a different American city through a series of interviews by Grohl. The group is also shown incorporating what they learned from the interviews into the writing and recording of a new song in or near that city. The series received equal acclaim to Sound City with the series receiving four nominations at the 67th Primetime Creative Arts Emmy Awards and ultimately winning two of the four.

In February 2021, it was announced that Grohl would be producing and directing a documentary streaming television series, based on the autobiographical novel From Cradle to Stage: Stories from the Mothers Who Rocked and Raised Rock Stars by his mother Virginia Grohl. The series, From Cradle to Stage premiered exclusively on Paramount+ on May 6, 2021, airing six episodes. In April 2021, it was announced Grohl directed a documentary What Drives Us, on van touring. It was released on April 30, 2021, on the Coda Collection via Amazon Prime. In November 2021, it was reported that a film starring the Foo Fighters, titled Studio 666 was shot in secret with filming taking place in the same house the band recorded their album Medicine at Midnight. Nearing the end of filming in early 2020, production was shut down due to the COVID-19 pandemic in the United States. Production resumed in Los Angeles months later, becoming one of the first films to do so during the pandemic.

On December 2, 2021, a sneak peek trailer was uploaded to the band's YouTube channel. The official trailer was announced through the band's Twitter on January 10, and was released on January 11. The film was released theatrically on February 25, 2022, by Open Road Films.

=== Productions ===
Year	Title				
Year	Title	Director(s)	Distributor(s)	Associated Production Companies	RT
2013	Sound City	Dave Grohl	Co-distribution with Gravitas Ventures and Variance Films		100%
2014	Foo Fighters: Sonic Highways	Dave Grohl	HBO	Diamond Docs, Therapy Content and Worldwide Pants	85%
2021	What Drives Us	Dave Grohl	Amazon Prime	Diamond Docs and Therapy Content	80%
2021	From Cradle to Stage	Dave Grohl	Paramount+	Endeavor Content, Live Nation Productions and MTV Entertainment Studios	N/A
2022	Studio 666	B. J. McDonnell	Open Road Films	Briarcliff Entertainment and Therapy Studios	55%

=== Accolades ===
Roswell Films has received numerous nominations and awards for their productions.

Year	Title	Award	Category	Result	Ref(s)
2014	Sound City	Cinema Eye Honors Awards	Cinema Eye Audience Choice Prize	Won	
2014	Sound City	Grammy Awards	Best Compilation Soundtrack for Visual Media	Won	
2014	Sound City	Grammy Awards	Best Rock Song ("Cut Me Some Slack")	Won	
2014	Sound City	Satellite Awards	Best Documentary Film	Nominated	
2015	Foo Fighters: Sonic Highways	NME Awards	Best TV Series	Nominated	
2015	Foo Fighters: Sonic Highways	Primetime Emmy Awards	Outstanding Directing for a Documentary/Nonfiction Program	Nominated	
2015	Foo Fighters: Sonic Highways	Primetime Emmy Awards	Outstanding Hosted Nonfiction Series or Special	Nominated	
2015	Foo Fighters: Sonic Highways	Primetime Emmy Awards	Outstanding Sound Editing for a Nonfiction or Reality Program	Won	
2015	Foo Fighters: Sonic Highways	Primetime Emmy Awards	Outstanding Sound Mixing for a Nonfiction or Reality Program	Won	
2016	Foo Fighters: Sonic Highways	Grammy Awards	Best Music Film	Nominated	

== See also ==
- Foo Fighters: Back and Forth
