= Complete Control Recording Sessions (Scream EP) =

EP by Scream
- Released: August 16, 2011
- Recorded: February 2011
- Studio: Studio 606, Los Angeles, California
- Genre: Punk rock
- Label: SideOneDummy
- Producer: John Lousteau, Scream

Scream chronology
Live at the Black Cat (1998)	Complete Control Recording Sessions (2011)

The Complete Control Sessions chronology
The Bouncing Souls (2011)	Scream (2011)	Anti-Flag (2011)

Complete Control Recording Sessions is a live EP by Scream. It was recorded at Dave Grohl's Studio 606 in February 2011 It is the second in SideOneDummy's series The Complete Control Sessions. It was released digitally and on vinyl on August 16, 2011. The artwork is by El Jefe Designs.

The track "Get Free" is featured in the 2012 film Ted.

== Track listing ==
No.	Title	Length
1.	"Stopwatch"	3:51
2.	"Get Free"	3:06
3.	"Jamin' at 606"	1:45
4.	"Elevate"	3:31
5.	"The Year Bald Headed Singers Were In"	2:01
6.	"Move (All Alone)"	2:44
7.	"Demolition Dancing"	2:41
8.	"Scream Interview by Joe Sibb" (only on digital version that comes with vinyl)

== Credits ==
- Peter Stahl – vocals
- Franz Stahl – guitar
- Clint Walsh – guitar
- Skeeter Thompson – bass
- Kent Stax – drums
