= Live at the Black Cat =

Live album by Scream
- Released: February 10, 1998
- Recorded: December 26, 1996
- Genre: Hardcore punk
- Length: 48:04
- Label: Torque

Scream chronology
Fumble (1993)	Live at the Black Cat (1998)	Complete Control Recording Sessions (2011)

Professional ratings
Review scores
Source	Rating
Allmusic	4/5 stars

Live at the Black Cat is a live album by American hardcore punk band Scream. It was released on February 10, 1998, by Torque Records. The album was recorded live at The Black Cat in Washington, D.C., on December 28, 1996, at a Christmas reunion show. The band featured the original band line-up of Franz Stahl on lead guitar, his brother Pete Stahl on lead vocals, Skeeter Thompson on bass and Kent Stax on drums. Robert "Harley" Davidson, who was picked up by the band in the mid-1980s during the recording of the band's second album "This Side Up" also performed on guitar on the recording. All material on the record was written by Franz and Pete Stahl with the exception of "No More Censorship" which was written by Davidson. Scream alumni drummer Dave Grohl who played with Nirvana and later Foo Fighters guest appeared as the drummer on "No More Censorship".

== Track listing ==
1. "Came Without Warning" – 2:15
2. "Cry Wolf" – 1:04
3. "This Side Up" – 2:37
4. "New Song" – 2:25
5. "Solidarity" – 1:42
6. "Total Mash" – 2:00
7. "Show & Tell Me" – 2:03
8. "Ultra Violence" – 1:38
9. "Still Screaming" – 2:35
10. "No More Censorship" – 4:27
11. "Fight/American Justice" – 3:52
12. "Zoo Closes" – 1:52
13. "Bet You Never Thought" – 2:59
14. "Hygiene" – 2:51
15. "Bedlam" – 1:52
16. "Influenced to Ignorance" – 1:12
17. "U Sucka" – 1:24
18. "We're Fed Up" – 1:34
19. "Human Behavior" – 1:50
20. "Feel Like That" – 5:52

== Personnel ==
Scream

- Pete Stahl – vocals
- Franz Stahl – guitar
- Skeeter Thompson – bass
- Robert "Harley" Davidson – guitar
- Kent Stax – drums, except on "No More Censorship"
- Dave Grohl – drums on "No More Censorship"
