= No More Censorship =

Studio album by Scream
- Released: August 1988
- Recorded: 1988
- Genre: Hardcore punk, post-hardcore
- Label: RAS Records

Scream chronology
Banging the Drum (1986)	No More Censorship (1988)	Your Choice Live Series Vol.10 (1990)

No More Censorship is the fourth studio album by American hardcore punk band Scream released in 1988 through RAS Records (RAS 4001). It is the first Scream album to feature Dave Grohl on drums, who went to be a part of many successful bands, most notably Nirvana and Foo Fighters.

No More Censorship was notably the first album by the band to be released by reggae label RAS Records, at the time RAS was attempting to dive into a rock market. The label brought Scream on board to attract other burgeoning rock acts.

In 2009, there were reports that Dave Grohl was interested in re-mixing the album for re-release. A reissue of the album, subtitled "NMC17", was released for Record Store Day/black Friday in 2017 by Southern Lord Recordings featuring a new mix overseen by guitarist Franz Stahl, an augmented track list, and all new artwork. The album was fully released on 27 April 2018.

== Track listing ==
1. "Hit Me"
2. "No More Censorship"
3. "Fucked Without a Kiss"
4. "No Escape"
5. "Building Dreams"
6. "Take It from the Top"
7. "Something in My Head"
8. "Its the Time"
9. "Binge"
10. "Run to the Sun"
11. "In the Beginning"

== Personnel ==
- Pete Stahl - vocals
- Franz Stahl - guitar
- Skeeter Thompson - bass
- Dave Grohl - drums
- Robert Lee Davidson - guitar
