= This Side Up (Scream album) =

Studio album by Scream
- Released: May 1985
- Recorded: February–March 1984, June–July 1984
- Studio: Ambient (College Park, Maryland); Inner Ear (Arlington, Virginia)
- Genre: Hardcore punk
- Length: 28:58
- Label: Dischord
- Producer: Doctor Know, Joey Pea, Don Zientara, Scream

Scream chronology
Still Screaming (1983)	This Side Up (1985)	Banging the Drum (1986)

Professional ratings
Review scores
Source	Rating
AllMusic	3/5 stars

This Side Up is the second album by hardcore punk band Scream, released in 1985 on the Dischord Records label. The album was the first to feature guitarist Robert Lee Davidson, who only performs on the second half of the album.

== Track listing ==
All tracks are written by Pete and Franz Stahl, except where noted.

Part A
No.	Title	Writer(s)	Length
1.	"Bet You Never Thought"		2:52
2.	"Things to Do Today"		1:25
3.	"This Side Up"		2:27
4.	"Gluesniff"	Kent Stax; R. Comish; B. Fleming	2:21
5.	"Still Screaming"		6:29

Part B
No.	Title	Writer(s)	Length
6.	"A No Money Down"		2:03
7.	"Show and Tell Me Baby"		1:47
8.	"The Zoo Closes at Dark"	P. Stahl; Skeeter Thompson	1:40
9.	"I Look When You Walk"		4:08
10.	"Iron Curtain"	Thompson	3:46

== Personnel ==
Personnel taken from This Side Up liner notes.

Scream

- Pete Stahl – lead vocals (all tracks)
- Franz Stahl – guitars (all tracks); backing vocals (tracks 6–10)
- Robert Lee Davidson – guitars, backing vocals (tracks 6–10)
- Skeeter Thompson – bass guitar (all tracks); backing vocals (tracks 1–5)
- Kent Stax – drums (all tracks); acoustic guitar (track 4)

Additional performers

- Doctor Know – piano (track 5)
- Doc Night – saxophone (track 5)
- Amy Pickering – backing vocals (track 9)

Production

- Scream – producer (all tracks)
- Joey Pea – producer (all tracks)
- Doctor Know – producer (tracks 1–5)
- Don Zientara – producer and engineer (tracks 6–10)
- Ray Tilkins – engineer (tracks 1–5)
- Naomi Petersen – photos
- Rossanne Diaz – photos
