= Banging the Drum =

Studio album by Scream
- Released: 1986
- Recorded: October 1985; January 1986; May 1986
- Genre: Hardcore punk, post-hardcore
- Length: 40:19
- Label: Dischord
- Producer: John Loder; Ian MacKaye; Don Zientara

Scream chronology
| This Side Up (1985) | Banging the Drum (1986) | No More Censorship (1988) |

Professional ratings
Review scores
| Source | Rating |
|---|---|
| AllMusic | 3/5 stars |

Banging the Drum is the third studio album by American hardcore punk band Scream, released in 1986 through Dischord Records. The album was the last to feature original drummer Kent Stax.

== Track listing ==
All songs written by Scream.

1. "Banging the Drum" – 0:55
2. "People People" – 5:15
3. "I.C.Y.U.O.D." – 4:38
4. "Nod to the East" – 0:59
5. "Mineshaft Burning" – 3:33
6. "The Rhythm Beating" – 4:20
7. "Feel Like That" – 5:09
8. "Walking by Myself" – 3:48
9. "When I Rise" – 3:36
10. "The Sing It Up Kidz" – 4:18
11. "Choke Word" – 3:38

== Credits ==
Scream

- Franz Stahl – guitars, vocals, acoustic guitar on "When I Rise"
- Robert Lee Davidson – guitars, vocals, acoustic guitar on "Choke Word"
- Skeeter Thompson – bass, vocals
- Kent Stax – drums, vocals
- Pete Stahl – lead vocals

Additional personnel

- John Loder – producer
- Ian MacKaye – producer, backing vocals
- Don Zientara – producer
- Joey Pea – assistant engineer
- Tos Nieuwenhuizen – backing vocals
- Amy Plckering – backing vocals
- Bobby Madden – keyboards on "Choke Word"
- Tomas Squip – photography
- Jeff Nelson – graphics
