= Still Screaming =

Studio album by Scream
- Released: January 1983
- Recorded: October 1982
- Genre: Hardcore punk
- Label: Dischord
- Producer: Ian MacKaye, Eddie Janney, Don Zientara, Jefferson Rogers, Scream

Scream chronology
Still Screaming (1983)	This Side Up (1985)

Still Screaming is the debut album by American hardcore punk band Scream, released in 1983 through Dischord Records.

== Track listing ==
All tracks are written by Scream, except where noted.

No.	Title	Lyrics	Music	Length
1.	"Came Without Warning"
2.	"Bedlam"
3.	"Solidarity"
4.	"Your Wars/Killer"	Scream; Clark Speaker
5.	"Piece of Her Time"		Scream; Jason Carmer
6.	"Human Behavior"
7.	"Stand"
8.	"Fight/American Justice"		Scream; Greg Miller
9.	"New Song"	Scream; Eric L.
10.	"Laissez-Faire""
11.	"Influenced"
12.	"Hygiene"
13.	"Cry Wolf"
14.	"Total Mash"
15.	"Who Knows? Who Cares?"
16.	"Amerarockers"
17.	"U. Suck A./We're Fed Up"
18.	"Ultraviolence/Screamin'"
19.	"Violent Youth"

== Personnel ==
Personnel taken from Still Screaming liner notes.

Scream

- Peter Stahl – vocals
- Franz Stahl – guitars, backing vocals
- Skeeter Thompson – bass, backing vocals
- Kent Stax – drums, backing vocals

Production

- Ian MacKaye – producer, backing vocals
- Eddie Janney – producer, backing vocals
- Don Zientara – producer, engineer
- Scream – producer
- Jefferson Rogers – producer on "Ultraviolence/Screamin'"
