= Your Choice Live Series Vol. 10 =

Live album by Scream
- Released: 1990
- Recorded: May 4, 1990
- Genre: Hardcore punk
- Label: Your Choice
- Producer: Tobby Holzinger

Scream chronology
No More Censorship (1988)	Your Choice Live Series Vol. 10 (1990)	Fumble (1993)

Your Choice Live Series Vol. 10 is a live album by American hardcore punk band Scream, released in 1990 through Your Choice Records. It was recorded live at the Oberhaus in Alzey, Germany, on May 4, 1990.

The band also performed the song "A No Money Down" that was left off this album and appears on the It's Your Choice compilation.

== Track listing ==
1. "C.W.W. (Part II)"
2. "I.C.Y.U.O.D."
3. "The Zoo Closes"
4. "Hot Smoke and Sasafrass"
5. "Fight"
6. "American Justice"
7. "Show and Tell"
8. "Sunmaker"
9. "No Escape"
10. "Take It from the Top"
11. "Dancing Madly Backwards"
12. "Hit Me"

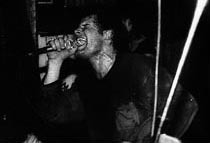
Pete Stahl (Scream) - recording a live album in Germany (1990)

== Personnel ==
- Scream
  - Pete Stahl – vocals
  - Franz Stahl – guitar
  - Skeeter Thompson – bass
  - Dave Grohl – drums
- Tobby Holzinger – producer
