= Wool (band) =

American rock band (1990–1996)

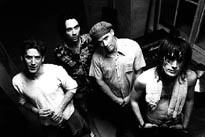
- Wool in 1995

Background information
- Origin: Washington, D.C., U.S.
- Genres: Grunge, punk rock, hard rock
- Years active: 1990–1996
- Labels: External, London
- Past members: Pete Stahl; Franz Stahl; Al Bloch; Peter Moffett; Chris Bratton

Wool was an American rock band from Washington, D.C., and based in Los Angeles. The band was active from 1990 to 1996 and specialized in a rough hewn but melodic brand of punk-based hard rock.

== History ==
Wool formed in the early 1990s when brothers Pete and Franz Stahl (vocals/guitar and guitar/vocals, respectively) were forced to terminate their popular band Scream after bassist Skeeter Thompson left the band and after drummer Dave Grohl joined Seattle grunge band Nirvana midway through a U.S. tour.

The brothers then teamed up with drummer Peter Moffett (also a member of Government Issue and Burning Airlines) and bassist Al Bloch (member of Concrete Blonde, and brother of Kurt Bloch from the Fastbacks).

The quartet's first single "Little Darlin'", is a well-regarded punk single. Then, the band released 1992's rollicking Budspawn, which was released independently on External Records (the original vinyl version consisted of eight tracks clocking in at over 30 minutes while the CD version had six tracks and was classified as an EP instead). The material on Budspawn combined the four members' inherent punk aesthetics with a tendency toward more straight-ahead, anthemic hard rock and drug-induced psychedelia.

Following a line-up change in which Moffett was replaced by Chris Bratton (Inside Out and Chain of Strength), Wool was signed to London Records in the newly punk-friendly climate of 1993. The band recorded Box Set in early 1994 and released it in the Fall of that year. Following in the footsteps of its predecessor, Box Set expanded on the basic blueprint of Wool's already established sound.

After a disappointing commercial reaction to Box Set, the band was dropped by London Records, early on in 1996. Wool recorded new demos in late '94 and late '95, but split up by summer of 1996. Later on guitarist/vocalist Franz Stahl became the touring guitarist for Japanese musician J, and joined former Scream bandmate Dave Grohl in the Foo Fighters, replacing departing guitarist Pat Smear. Franz's tenure in the band included the entire world tour for the 1997 album The Colour and the Shape. Pete Stahl went on to play with Earthlings? and Goatsnake and appeared on several of Josh Homme's (Queens of the Stone Age) The Desert Sessions albums. Later on he became a tour manager for many bands, including Foo Fighters, Cave In and Rammstein.

As of October 22, 2025 the band’s page on Spotify contains albums by this group and other artists with the same name.

== Members ==
- Pete Stahl – vocals, guitar
- Franz Stahl – guitar, vocals
- Al Bloch – bass, vocals
- Chris Bratton – drums (1993–1996)
- Peter Moffett – drums, vocals (1990–1993)

== Discography ==
=== Little Darlin (7-inch) (1991) ===
1. "Little Darlin"
2. "Medication"

=== Mayday (7-inch) (1992) ===
1. "S.O.S."
2. "Run-Hide"

=== Medication (7-inch) (1992) ===
1. "Medication"
2. "Marky St. James"

=== Budspawn (1992) ===
1. "S.O.S."
2. "Slightly Under"
3. "Clear My Head"
4. "Wait"
5. "Medication"
6. "Eff"

=== Budspawn (vinyl) (1992) ===
1. "S.O.S."
2. "Slightly Under"
3. "Clear My Head"
4. "Love My Gun"
5. "Wait"
6. "Medication"
7. "Eff"
8. "Marky St. James"

=== Box Set (1994) ===
1. "Eden"
2. "Kill the Crow"
3. "Eat Some Ziti"
4. "Superman Is Dead"
5. "B-350"
6. "Chances Are"
7. "Coalinga"
8. "Speak"
9. "God Rest His Soul"
10. "Blackeye
11. "Take a Look"

=== Bonus 7-inch included with vinyl pressing of Box Set ===
1. "So Many Ways"
2. "Sister Song"
3. "Dear Dorothy"

=== Kill The Crow (1994) ===
1. "Kill the Crow"
2. "The Witch"

=== Your Choice Live Series (1995) ===
Released via Your Choice Records. This album is available on Spotify.

1. "S.O.S."
2. "Kill the Crow"
3. "Soundchecksong"
4. "Car Crash"
5. "Clear My Head"
6. "Eden"
7. "B-350"
8. "Zitty"
9. "Blackeye"
10. "Coalinga"
11. "Superman Is Dead"
12. "Medication"
13. "Wait"
14. "Eff"
15. "Sistersong"

=== Single Limited Vinyl Edition (1996) ===
Crippled Dick Hot Wax record, Wool appears courtesy of London Records.

1. "Sound Check Song"
2. "Don't Bother Me"

=== Shine! / Short Term Memory Loss (1996) ===
Bong Load Records – limited edition vinyl split single with Kyuss.

1. "Short Term Memory Loss"

=== Lunar Momento: Lost Rancho Session 1 (2012) ===
Released via Dine Alone Records.

1. "Everything We Do"
2. "Car Crash"
3. "Flana Flan a Flan Flan"
4. "Wonderful"
5. "Father of Three"
6. "My Girlfriend Is a Rock"
7. "Satsuma Saturday Night"
8. "Pockets"
9. "Snakecharmer"
10. "Sibling Rivalry Redux"
11. "Shining Down"
12. "I Am You"

=== Lunar Momento: Lost Rancho Session 2 (2012) ===
Released via Dine Alone Records. This album features on Spotify.

1. "Hey Y'all"
2. "Bald Singers"
3. "The Whistler"
4. "It's All Over Now Baby Blue"
5. "Dancing on the Table"
6. "Sibling Rivalry (1994)"
7. "Country Song"
8. "45 Rev 1995"
9. "In My Backyard"
10. "Lucy Throw Them Down"
11. "Sound Check Song"
12. "Rats Head"
13. "I Still Remember"
