= Get Free =

Get Free may refer to:

- "Get Free" (The Vines song), 2002
- "Get Free" (Major Lazer song), 2013
- "Get Free" (Lana Del Rey song), 2017
- "Get Free", a 2011 song by Scream from Complete Control Recording Sessions

== See also ==
- "Freedom Dance (Get Free!)", a 1991 song by Vanessa Williams from The Comfort Zone
