= Caffeine Dream =

Caffeine Dream may refer to:

- Caffeine Dream, a 2006 album by Qwel
- "Caffeine Dream", a song by Scream from Fumble
