= Box Set (Wool album) =

Studio album by Wool
- Released: 1994
- Recorded: December 1993, January 1994
- Studio: Philos Ranch, Mendocino, CA, Stagg Street, Van Nuys, CA
- Genre: Rock
- Length: 47:52
- Label: London
- Producer: Rob Schnapf, Tom Rothrock

Wool chronology
Budspawn EP (1992)	Box Set (1994)

Box Set is an album by the American band Wool, released in 1994. Despite its title, Box Set is a studio album. The band supported the album with a North American tour.

== Production ==
The album was produced by Rob Schnapf and Tom Rothrock. Chris Bratton replaced Peter Moffett on drums prior to the recording of Box Set. Wool included a fake history of the band in the liner notes to the album, alleging encounters with famous musicians over the course of three decades; they successfully fooled several journalists. "God Rest His Soul" is a cover of the Gregg Allman song.

== Critical reception ==
Professional ratings
Review scores
Source	Rating
AllMusic	4/5 stars
Entertainment Weekly	B
Pittsburgh Post-Gazette	2.5/4 stars
The San Diego Union-Tribune	2/4 stars

Trouser Press thought that "weird production (the second Van Halen album would seem to be a significant model) and an ungainly stab at MTV presentability makes the de-punked Box Set a dreadfully uneven—and occasionally dreadful—album." Entertainment Weekly called "Take a Look" "a 12-minute opus that bridges the gap between trippy Fillmore-era jam sessions and '90s grungefests."

The Telegram & Gazette stated that "the pop hooks are big, the electric guitar lines are shoved through wah-wahs and fuzz boxes for some irresistible confection and a sloppy, good-time feel permeates many of the 11 tracks." The Pittsburgh Post-Gazette called the album "a nearly auspicious debut by a genre-bending band that knows enough about crafting thoughtful, raucous songs to remind listeners of the early Replacements." The Chicago Sun-Times deemed it "a strong debut album of stripped-down, hooky garage rock."

AllMusic wrote that "this was an unfairly overlooked album, lost amid the overwhelming glut of alternative rock in the early '90s (which saw far lesser bands like Bush receiving undue amounts of attention)."

== Track listing ==
No.	Title	Length
1.	"Eden"	3:09
2.	"Kill the Crow"	3:10
3.	"Eat Some Ziti"	0:33
4.	"Superman Is Dead"	2:03
5.	"B-350"	6:46
6.	"Chances Are"	4:37
7.	"Coalinga"	3:16
8.	"Speak"	3:56
9.	"God Rest His Soul"	4:47
10.	"Blackeye"	3:48
11.	"Take a Look"	11:47

== Personnel ==
- Al Bloch – bass
- Chris Bratton – drums
- Franz Stahl – guitar
- Pete Stahl – vocals
