= The Storyteller: Tales of Life and Music =

2021 autobiography by Dave Grohl

- First edition cover
- Author: Dave Grohl
- Audio read by: Dave Grohl
- Language: English
- Subject: Autobiography
- Publisher: Dey Street Books
- Publication date: October 5, 2021
- Publication place: New York
- Media type: Print (hardcover)
- Pages: 376
- ISBN: 978-0-06-307609-9
- OCLC: 1268472534
- Dewey Decimal: 782.42166092 B
- LC Class: ML420.G864 A3 2021

The Storyteller: Tales of Life and Music is a 2021 autobiography by American rock musician Dave Grohl, founder of Foo Fighters and formerly drummer of Nirvana. The book consists of a selection of short stories and anecdotes, which Grohl likened to the songs on an album. The Storyteller was praised as upbeat and enjoyable, but criticized for being sparing on subjects such as Nirvana.

== Background ==
During the COVID-19 pandemic, Grohl opened an Instagram account @davestruestories, in which he told short stories from his life. Several of these, such as being hit with a golf club as a child, are featured in the book. Grohl likened the compilation of stories to making an album, as he had to choose the right stories to open and close the book, as well as have appropriate sequencing in between. Grohl said that parts of the book were cut by publishers for being offensive.

The book was announced in April 2021, to be released on October 5. In November 2023, Grohl released an extended paperback edition of the book, featuring essays on creativity, details of the creation of four Foo Fighters songs, and an account of meeting Paul McCartney that was previously exclusive to the audiobook.

== Synopsis ==
Grohl narrates his life, from his childhood in suburban Virginia when he practiced drumming on his own teeth, to dropping out of high school to play in the punk band Scream. He then joins the ascendant Nirvana, initially sleeping on singer Kurt Cobain's couch and living in squalor. Nirvana's rise ends with Cobain's 1994 suicide, following which Grohl founds Foo Fighters, playing every instrument on their eponymous debut album.

== Reception ==
Several reviewers found The Storyteller to be upbeat and enjoyable, but to be brief or lacking on several subjects, including Nirvana, Cobain's suicide, Grohl and bassist Krist Novoselic's prolonged legal conflict with Cobain's widow Courtney Love, Grohl's first marriage and the frequent rotation of members of Foo Fighters. The use of an unorthodox font for emphasis was criticized.

Grohl did a one-man show titled The Storyteller in which he told monologues of stories from the book, along with performances of his songs. Ian Gittin praised the performance in The Guardian, but found both the book and the show to be too long.

The book went straight to number one on the hardcover non-fiction charts in the United States, and remained there for a second week.
