= Enoch Thompson =

Enoch Thompson may refer to:

- J. Enoch Thompson (1846–1932), Toronto businessman
- Skeeter Thompson, American punk bassist
- Nucky Thompson, a fictional character on Boardwalk Empire loosely based on Enoch L. Johnson (1883–1968), Atlantic City, New Jersey political boss and racketeer
