= Pete Stahl =

American musician

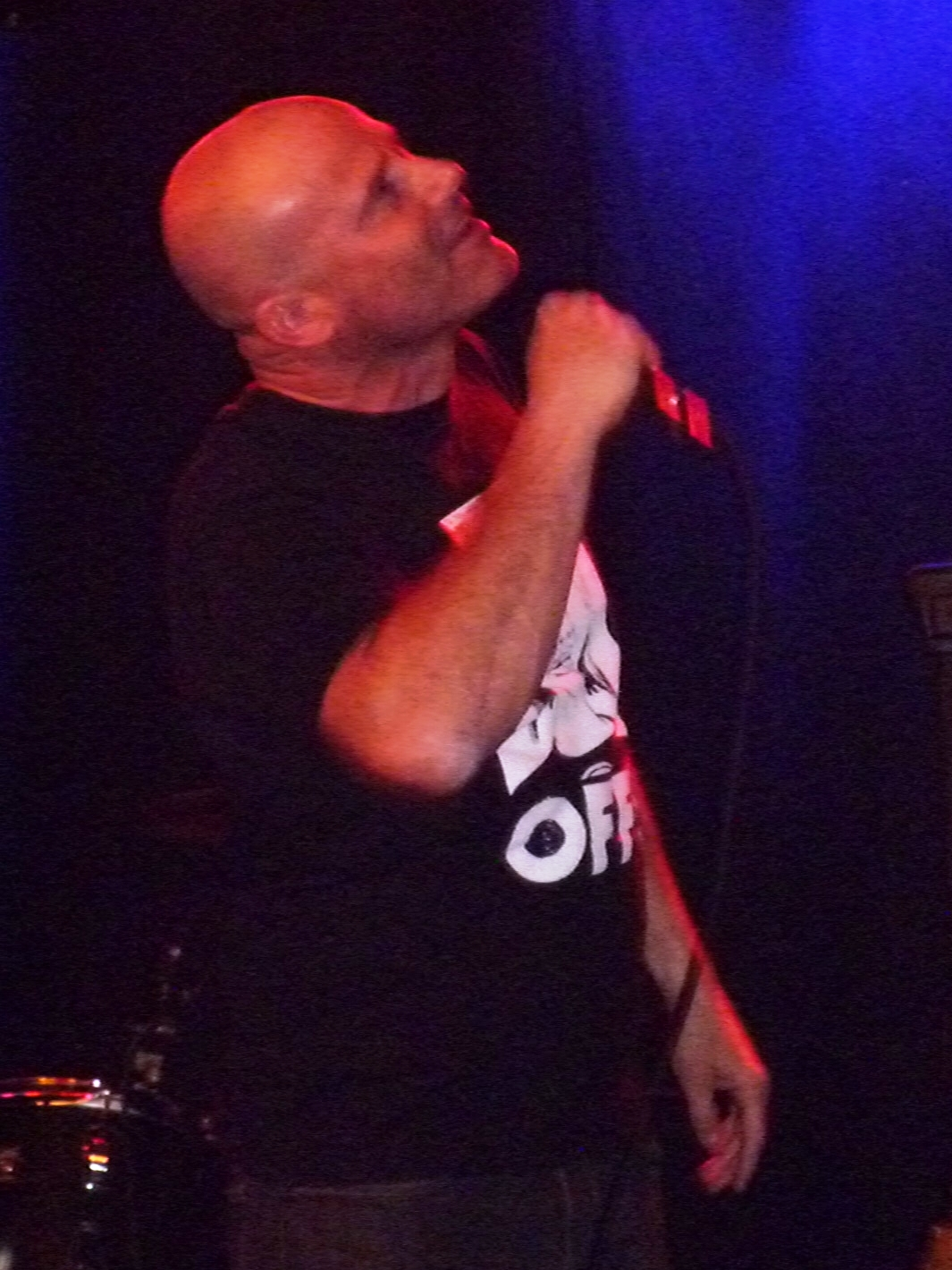
- Stahl in 2012

Background information
- Born: Peter Marc Stahl
- Genres: Hardcore punk; post-hardcore; stoner rock; doom metal
- Occupations: Singer; musician
- Instruments: Vocals; guitar; harmonica
- Member of: Scream; Goatsnake; The Desert Sessions
- Formerly of: Wool; Earthlings?

Peter Marc Stahl is an American musician best known for the Virginia-based punk/hardcore band Scream with his brother Franz, along with childhood friends Enoch Thompson and Kent Stacks.

Scream also briefly featured drummer Dave Grohl, who went on to stardom with Nirvana and Foo Fighters. Grohl credited Pete Stahl as the inspiration for the song "My Hero".

Stahl went on to form Wool with his brother in the 1990s, and also has sung for Goatsnake and Earthlings?. He also worked for The Viper Room in Los Angeles, and contributed to the Sunn O))) album ØØ Void, and was featured on Orquesta del Desierto, a series of albums written about the desert. Stahl has also contributed to volumes 1 to 4 of Josh Homme's musical collaborative series The Desert Sessions, and toured with Queens of the Stone Age from 1998 to 1999 to perform these songs in addition to doing backing vocals for various songs by Queens of the Stone Age.

Stahl also works as a tour manager, primarily for Rival Sons and Coheed and Cambria.

== Discography ==
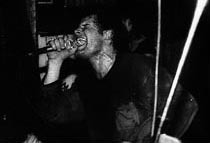
Stahl performing in 1990

Scream

- 1983: Still Screaming (Dischord Records)
- 1985: This Side Up (Dischord Records)
- 1986: Banging the Drum (Dischord Records)
- 1988: No More Censorship (RAS Records)
- 1989: State of the Union (Compilation) (Dischord Records)
- 1990: Your Choice Live Series Vol.10 (Live album) (Your Choice Records)
- 1991: It's Your Choice (Compilation) (Your Choice Records)
- 1993: Fumble (Dischord Records)
- 1998: Live at the Black Cat (Live album) (Torque Records)
- 2003: 20 Years of Dischord (Compilation) (Dischord Records)
- 2011: Complete Control Recording Sessions (Live Studio EP) (SideOneDummy Records)

Wool

- 1992: Budspawn (External)
- 1994: Box Set (PolyGram)
- 1994: Kill the Crow (PolyGram)
- 1995: Your Choice Live Series (Live album) (Your Choice Records)

Goatsnake

- 1998: IV (EP) (Prosthetic Records)
- 1998: Man of Light (EP) (Warpburner Recordings)
- 1999: Goatsnake Vol. 1 (Man's Ruin Records)
- 2000: Goatsnake/Burning Witch split (Hydra Head)
- 2000: Dog Days (EP) (Southern Lord Records)
- 2000: Flower of Disease (Man's Ruin Records)
- 2004: Trampled Under Hoof (EP) (Southern Lord Records)
- 2015: Black Age Blues (Southern Lord Records)

The Desert Sessions

- 1998: Volumes 1 & 2
- 1998: Volumes 3 & 4

Other

- 1997: Metro
- 2000: Queens of the Stone Age – Rated R (backing vocals on The Lost Art of Keeping a Secret) (Interscope Records)
- 2000: Sunn O))) – ØØ Void
- 2000: Earthlings? – The Earthlings?
- 2000: Earthlings? – Human Beans
- 2002: Earthlings? – Disco Marching Kraft (EP) (Crippled Dick Hot Wax)
- 2002: Orquesta del Desierto – Orquesta del Desierto
- 2004: Orquesta del Desierto – Dos
- 2008: Danko Jones – Never Too Loud (guest vocals on Forest for the Trees) (Aquarius Records, Bad Taste Records)
- 2008: Chingalera – Dose (guest vocals on Twenty Three)
- 2009: Earthlings? – Humalian (EP) (Treasurecraft Records)
- 2011: Sunn O))) meets Nurse with Wound – The Iron Soul of Nothing (vocals on Ash on the Trees)
- 2014: Teenage Time Killers – vocals on Plank Walk
- 2014: Foo Fighters – Sonic Highways (backing vocals on The Feast and the Famine)
