= Fumble (disambiguation) =

A fumble is a loss of ball possession in American football, and other ball sports.

Fumble may also refer to:

== American football ==
- The Fumble, a particularly notable fumble in the 1987 AFC Championship Game between the Cleveland Browns and the Denver Broncos
- Miracle at the Meadowlands, also known as "The Fumble", an incident in a 1978 New York Giants game

== Music ==
- Fumble (album), a 1993 album by Scream
- Fumble (band), a 1970s British rock group
- "Fumble" (song), a 2023 song by Sudley
