= Tina Basich =

American snowboarder

Tina Basich (born June 29, 1969) is an American snowboarder, originally from Sacramento, California. Basich began snowboarding in 1986, when the sport was still new. She is noted for winning a variety of competitions from the 1980s onward, and for being the first woman to successfully land a backside 720 in competition, at the 1998 Winter X Games Big Air. She also played a part in the design of outerwear and snowboards for women, including one of the first women's pro-models for SIMS Snowboards, alongside Shannon Dunn-Downing. Basich was also one of the founders of Boarding for Breast Cancer, and hosted the girl action sports TV show GKA.

In the late 1990s, Basich dated musician Dave Grohl for a couple of years. Basich ended the relationship after discovering his infidelity. In 2003, she wrote an autobiography titled Pretty Good for a Girl.

== Competition history ==
- 2000 G Shock Air and Style - Corner Challenge - 4th
- 2000 Sims Invitational World Snowboard Championships - Whistler = Big Air - 2nd
- 1999 Boarding for Breast Cancer - Big Air - 1st
- 1998 Winter X Games - Snowboard Big Air - 1st
- 1998 Winter X Games - Snowboard Slopestyle - 6th
- 1997 Winter X Games Snowboard Big Air - 3rd
- 1997 ESPN Freeride - Aspen - Big Air - 1st
- 1997 King of the Hill - Extreme - 2nd
- 1997 US Open - Halfpipe - 2nd
