= The Complete Control Sessions =

The Complete Control Sessions is a series of live recordings by SideOneDummy Records. The series, which the label compares to Peel Sessions, features live recordings by various punk bands released digitally and on vinyl. The artwork for each release is done by El Jefe Designs. Although the first official release in the series is by The Bouncing Souls in April 2011, the label previously released a live EP by Flogging Molly with the title Complete Control Sessions in March 2007.

The series is a spin-off of Complete Control Radio, a weekly radio show hosted by Joe Sib, co-founder of SideOneDummy.

== Releases ==
#	Band	Title	Release date
N/A	Flogging Molly	Complete Control Sessions	March 13, 2007
1	The Bouncing Souls	Complete Control Recording Sessions	April 12, 2011
2	Scream	Complete Control Recording Sessions	August 16, 2011
3	Anti-Flag	Complete Control Recording Sessions	September 27, 2011
4	Smoking Popes	Complete Control Recording Sessions	May 1, 2012
5	Samiam	Complete Control Recording Sessions	October 23, 2012
