= Fumble (album) =

Studio album by Scream
- Released: July 1993
- Recorded: December 1989
- Genre: Post-hardcore
- Length: 44:41
- Label: Dischord
- Producer: Eli Janney

Scream chronology
Your Choice Live Series Vol.10 (1990)	Fumble (1993)	Live at the Black Cat (1998)

Fumble is the fifth studio album by American hardcore band Scream. It was recorded in December 1989 at Inner Ear Studios in Arlington, Virginia, and released in July 1993 through Dischord. It is notable for showcasing the band's expansion in style, towards a more post-hardcore sound.

Dave Grohl played drums on the album. He took a lead vocal on one track and helped to write others.

== Critical reception ==
Professional ratings
Review scores
Source	Rating
AllMusic	3/5 stars

Newsday praised Grohl's drumming on the album, writing that it "has that baseball-bats-against-tree-trunks quality that [he] would make so distinctive in Nirvana."

== Track listing ==
All songs written by Scream.

1. "Caffeine Dream" - 3:14
2. "Sunmaker" - 4:48
3. "Mardi Gras" - 3:51
4. "Land Torn Down" - 3:59
5. "Gods Look Down" - 4:18
6. "Crackman" - 5:43
7. "Gas" - 4:37
8. "Dying Days" - 5:22
9. "Poppa Says" - 4:12
10. "Rain" - 4:37

("Crackman" does not appear on the CD version.)

== Personnel ==
- Scream
  - Peter Stahl - lead vocals, mixing
  - Franz Stahl - guitars, vocals, mixing
  - Skeeter Thompson - bass, vocals
  - Dave Grohl - drums, lead vocals on "Gods Look Down"
- Eli Janney - producer, mixing
- Tomas Squip - photography
