= Complete Control Recording Sessions (The Bouncing Souls EP) =

EP by the Bouncing Souls
- Released: April 12, 2011
- Recorded: 2010
- Genre: Punk rock
- Label: SideOneDummy

The Bouncing Souls chronology
Ghosts on the Boardwalk (2010)	Complete Control Recording Sessions (2011)	Comet (2012)

Complete Control Recording Sessions is a live EP by the Bouncing Souls. It was recorded at Swing House Studios in Los Angeles, California. It is the first in SideOneDummy's series The Complete Control Sessions. It was released digitally and on vinyl on April 12, 2011. The artwork is by El Jefe Designs.

== Track listing ==
No.	Title	Length
1.	"Highway Kings"	1:45
2.	"Hybrid Moments" (Misfits cover, features Matt Skiba)	2:28
3.	"The Guest"	2:24
4.	"Gone"	4:01
5.	"The Freaks, the Nerds and the Romantics"	2:43
6.	"The Fall Song"	1:48
7.	"The Bouncing Souls Interview by Joe Sibb" (only on digital version that comes with vinyl and on iTunes version)	7:19

== Credits ==
- Greg Attonito – vocals
- Pete Steinkopf – guitar
- Bryan Kienlen – bass
- Michael McDermott – drums
