= Scream (band) =

American hardcore punk band

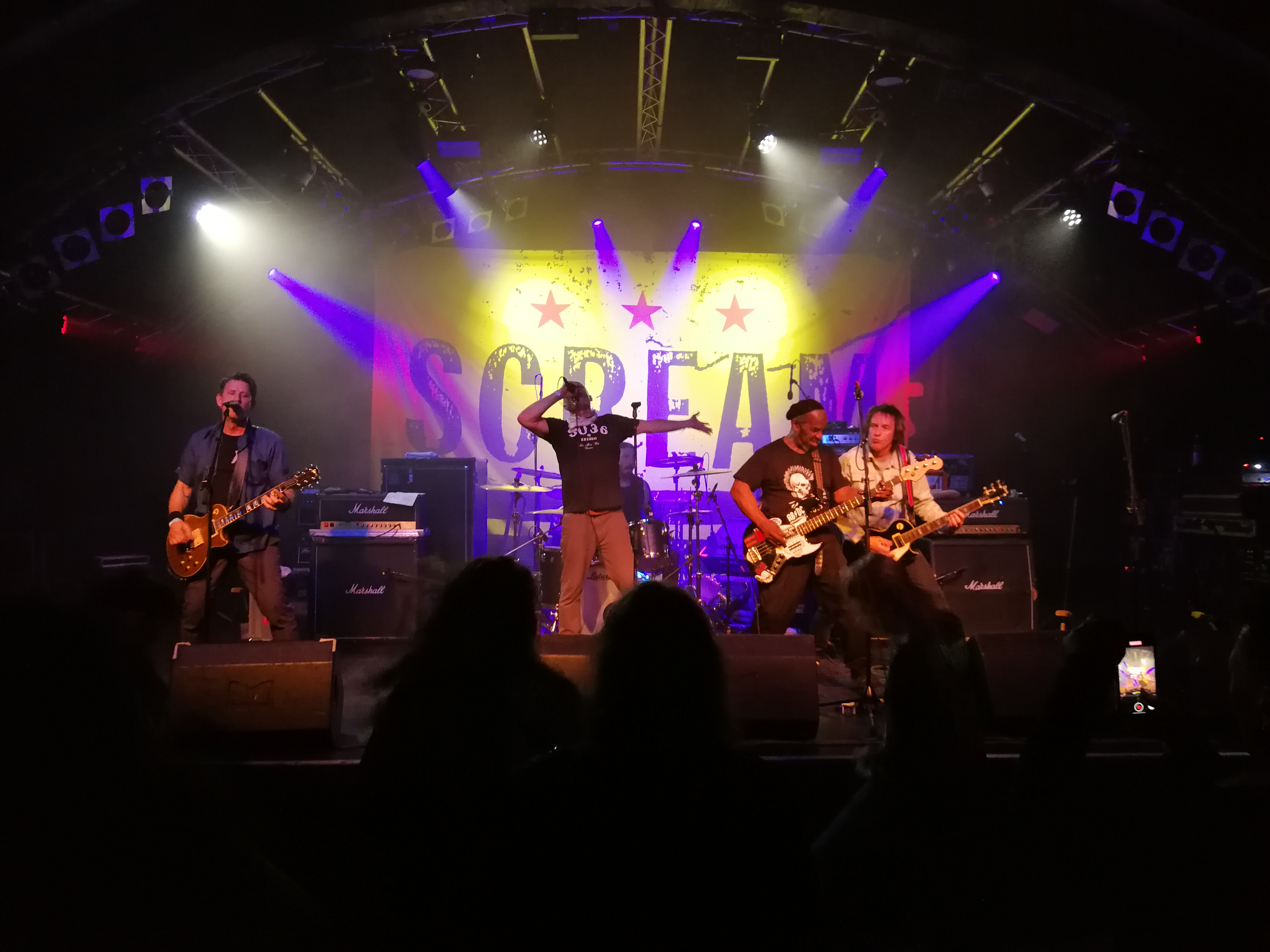
- Scream in 2024

Background information
- Origin: Alexandria, Virginia, U.S.
- Genres: Hardcore punk; post-hardcore
- Years active: 1981–1990; 1993; 1994; 1996; 2009–present
- Labels: Dischord; Jungle Hop; Konkurrel; RAS; DSI; Your Choice; Torque
- Members: Pete Stahl; Franz Stahl; Skeeter Thompson; Clint Walsh; Jerry Busher
- Past members: Kent Stax; Robert Lee Davidson; Dave Grohl; J. Robbins

Scream is an American hardcore punk band from Washington, D.C.; they originally formed in the suburb of Bailey's Crossroads, Virginia. Scream originally formed in 1981 within the vanguard of the Washington Hardcore explosion. In 2009, the band reunited, and as of January 2012 were on tour in Europe.

== History ==
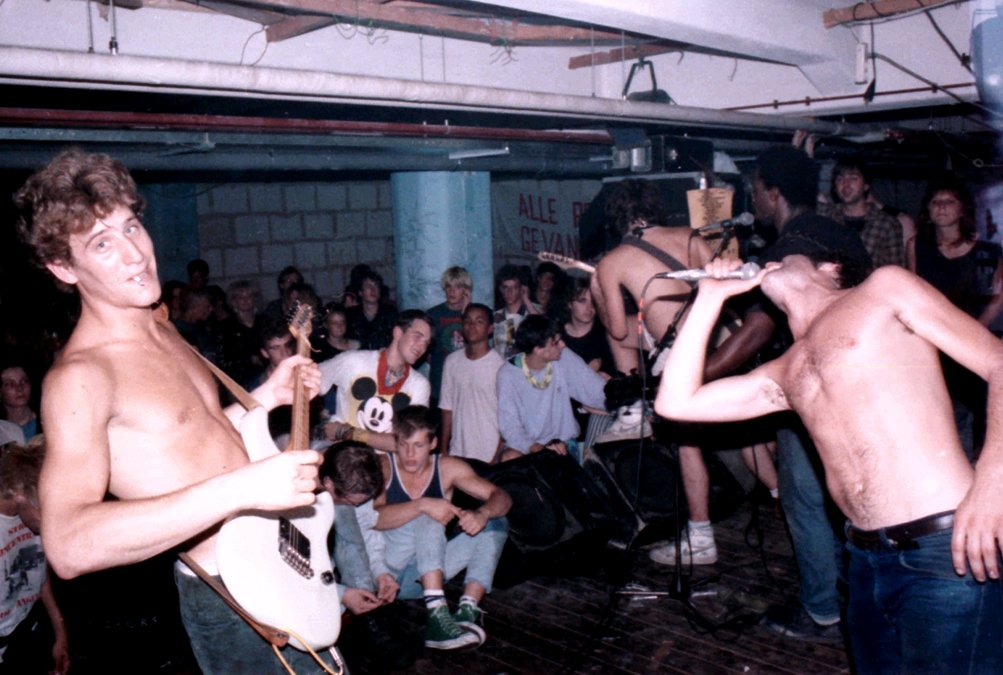
Scream (1986)

Scream was formed in Northern Virginia in 1981 by singer Pete Stahl, his brother Franz Stahl on guitar, bassist Skeeter Thompson, and Kent Stax, who replaced original drummer Steve Atton shortly after the band formed. Scream emerged at the tail end of the first wave of Washington, D.C., hardcore and would go on to outlast many of their fellow bands from D.C.'s early hardcore punk scene. Along with bands such as Minor Threat and Government Issue, Scream merged the attributes of the movement, including fast tempos, sociopolitical lyrics, deliberately unpretentious attitude, and a shunning of commercialism.

Recording their music in the basement of Inner Ear Studios in Arlington, Virginia, Scream was the first band on D.C.'s independent Dischord Records label to release a full-length album as opposed to the 7-inch or 12-inch EPs that comprised Dischord's catalogue up to that point.

For their second album, Scream added another guitarist to their line-up, Robert Lee "Harley" Davidson, to thicken up the sound in the studio and in their live performances. In turn this yielded a dual-lead guitar style and intricate interplay between the musicians on the band's third album. For selected compilation efforts and some live shows Scream added DC keyboard player Bobby Madden during this period.

After the third album Banging the Drum, Stax left the band for personal reasons and was replaced by then 17-year-old local drummer Dave Grohl who lied to the band about his age in order to tour with them. Grohl joined the band in the studio to record their fourth album No More Censorship for which the band opted a release through reggae label RAS Records instead of Dischord. The band then toured Europe in the spring of 1990, during which time their show in Alzey, Germany was recorded for release on Your Choice Live Series Vol.10. Scream then recorded their fifth studio album, Fumble, which didn't see release until 1993, three years after the group's break-up.

=== Post-breakup and one-off tours ===
After Scream's break up, Grohl moved to Seattle to play drums for the rock band Nirvana, while Pete and Franz remained in North Hollywood and started the rock band Wool.

To coincide with the belated release of the album Fumble, the Stahl/Stahl/Thompson/Grohl lineup of Scream toured North America in the summer of 1993. The Stahl/Stahl/Thompson/Grohl lineup of Scream performed at The Dragonfly, in Los Angeles, in August 1994, for a one-off "mini reunion" with Zack de la Rocha of Rage Against The Machine sitting in on the song "Human Behavior". The Stahl/Stahl/Davidson/Thompson/Stax lineup of Scream then reformed to play a one-off reunion show at the Black Cat nightclub in Washington, D.C., on December 28, 1996, with Grohl joining the band on drums for the song "No More Censorship". This performance was later released as Live at the Black Cat in 1998 on Torque Records.

In 1997, Franz Stahl joined Grohl's newly formed group, the Foo Fighters, for a two-year stint. During this time, Pete Stahl worked as a road manager for both the Foo Fighters and Queens of the Stone Age while continuing to record albums with several bands, including the Earthlings? and Goatsnake. Thompson remained in the D.C. area and continued to work in bands, including playing one gig at the Brickskeller in the spring of 1994 as Scream with keyboardist Robert Hunter, as did Stax with the Skinhead/Oi!-tinged bands: the Suspects, United 121, Spitfires United, and Alleged Bricks. Stax also committed himself to a family life. Davidson moved to Los Angeles and joined The Drills from 1989 to 1991. He returned to the D.C. area and formed the band Orangahead in the mid 1990s with Thompson and then joined up with the Baltimore-based punk band Jakkpot in 1998 for a European tour. Davidson went on to form new bands Festival of Fools and God is Dead.

=== Reunion ===
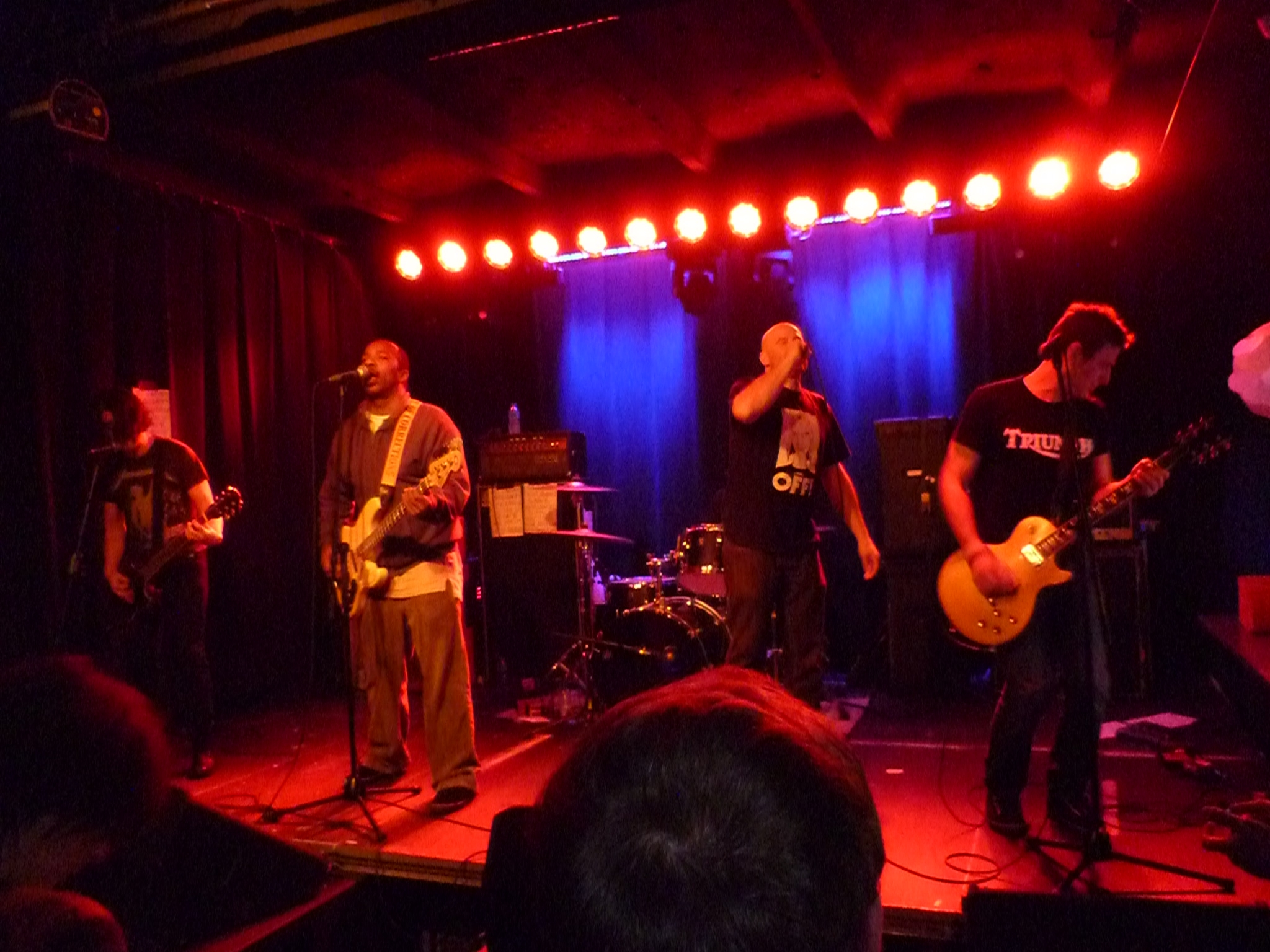
Scream in 2012

The original line-up of the band played a reunion show on December 20, 2009, once again at the Black Cat. An ad hoc lineup consisting of Pete Stahl (vocals), Grohl (electric guitar), Thompson (bass) and Stax (drums) performed "Choke Word" and two Bad Brains covers at the 9:30 Club's 30th anniversary bash on May 31, 2010.

In 2011, the original line-up of Scream recorded the Complete Control Sessions EP at Grohl's Studio 606 in Los Angeles. It was issued on vinyl and digital download. The following year, the band did a European tour.

In March 2018, Pete Stahl announced that their 1988 album No More Censorship would be reissued on April 27, 2018.

Stax died from cancer on September 20, 2023. By the next month he had been replaced by Jerry Busher.

Scream released the album DC Special on November 10, 2023 on Dischord Records.

== Band members ==
=== Current ===
- Pete Stahl – lead vocals (1981–1990, 1993, 2009–present)
- Franz Stahl – guitar, backing vocals (1981–1990, 1993, 2009–present)
- Skeeter Thompson – bass, backing vocals (1981–1988, 1988–1990, 1993, 2009–present)
- Clint Walsh – guitar, backing vocals (2009–present)
- Jerry Busher – drums (2023–present)

=== Former ===
- Kent Stax – drums, percussion, backing vocals (1981–1986, 2009–2023, his death)
- Dave Grohl – drums, percussion, vocals (1986–1990, 1993)
- Robert Lee Davidson – guitar, backing vocals (1984–1989)
- J. Robbins – bass (1988)

=== Touring ===
- Bobby Madden – keyboards (1984–1985)
- John S. Pappas – drums (1985)
- Ben Pape – bass (1988)
- Andrew Black – drums (2024)

== Discography ==
=== Studio albums ===
- Still Screaming (1983) Dischord Records
- This Side Up (1985) Dischord Records
- Banging the Drum (1986) Dischord Records
- No More Censorship (1988) RAS Records
- Fumble (1993) Dischord Records
- DC Special (2023) Dischord Records

=== EPs ===
- Complete Control Recording Sessions (2011) SideOneDummy Records

=== Compilation albums ===
- Still Screaming/This Side Up (1995) Dischord Records
- Fumble + Banging the Drum (1995) Dischord Records

=== Live albums ===
- Live at Van Hall (1988) Konkurrent Records
- Your Choice Live Series Vol.10 (1990) Your Choice Records
- Live at the Black Cat (1998) Torque Records

=== Singles ===
- "Walking by Myself" b/w "Choke Word" (1986) Jungle Hop Records
- "Mardi Gras" b/w "Land Torn Down" (1990) DSI Records

=== Compilation appearances ===
- Bouncing Babies (1984) Fountain of Youth Records – "Ultra Violence/Screaming"
- Flipside Vinyl Fanzine (1984) Gasatanka/Enigma Records – "Fight"
- Another Shot for Bracken (1986) Positive Force Records – "Green Eyed Lady"
- F.R. 5 (1986) Fetal Records – "Solidarity"
- Viva Umkhonto! (1987) Mordam/Konkurrel Records – "Feel Like That"
- State of the Union (1989) Dischord Records – "Ameri-dub"
- It's Your Choice (1991) Your Choice Records – "A No Money Down" (live)
- 20 Years of Dischord (2003) Dischord Records – "Fight/American Justice" and "Search for Employment"
