= Dave Grohl =

American rock musician and songwriter (born 1969)

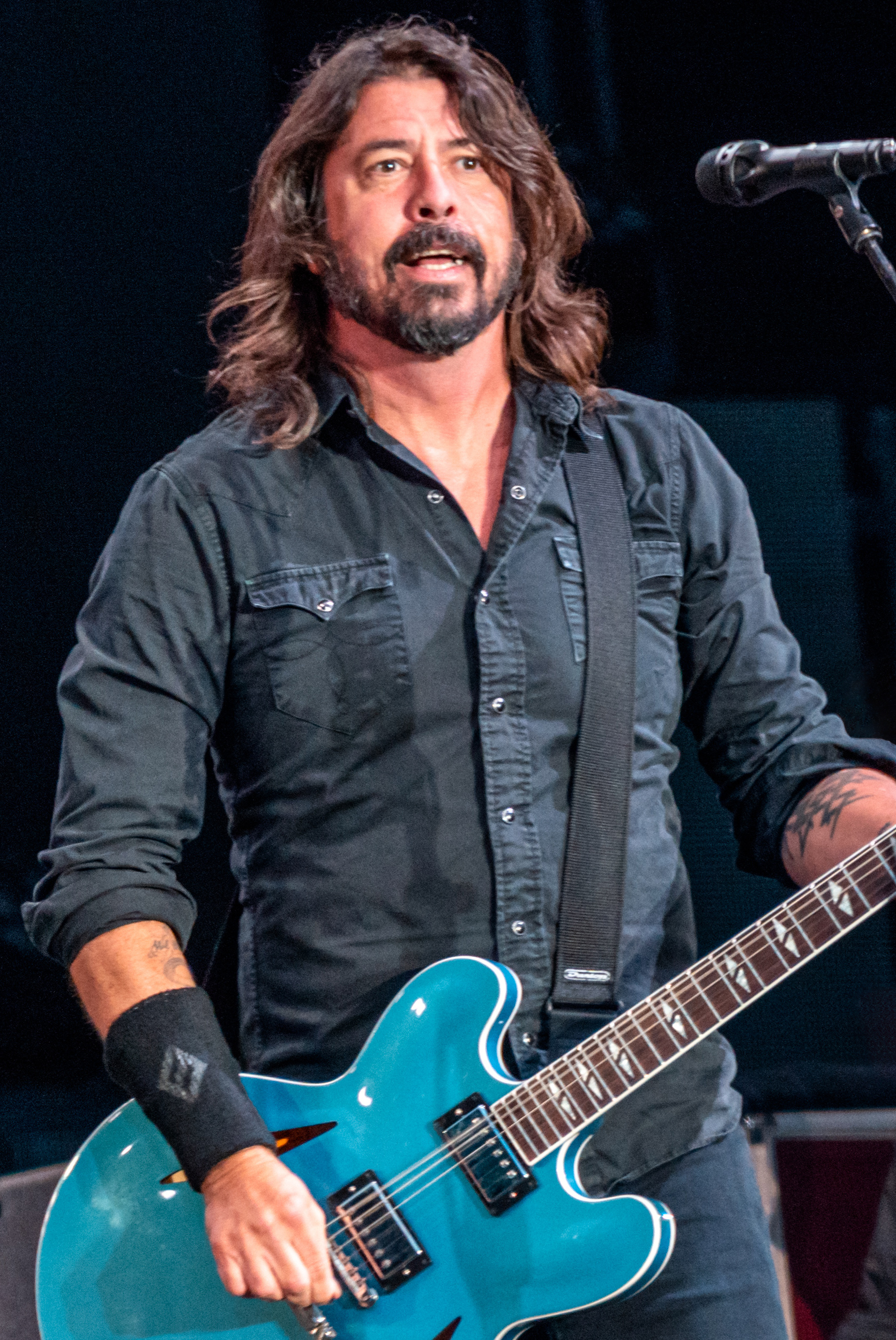
- Grohl performing in 2019
- Born: David Eric Grohl; January 14, 1969 (age 57); Warren, Ohio, U.S.
- Occupations: Musician; singer; songwriter; record producer; actor
- Years active: 1982–present
- Spouses: Jennifer Leigh Youngblood (m. 1994; div. 1997) Jordyn Blum (m. 2003)
- Children: 4, including Violet
- Musical career
- Genres: Alternative rock; hard rock; grunge; punk rock (early)
- Instruments: Vocals; guitar; drums; bass
- Member of: Foo Fighters; Them Crooked Vultures
- Formerly of: Scream; Nirvana; Backbeat Band; Queens of the Stone Age; Mondo Generator; Sound City Players

David Eric Grohl (/ˈɡroʊl/; born January 14, 1969) is an American musician, singer, actor, record producer, and songwriter. He founded the rock band Foo Fighters, of which he is the lead singer, guitarist, principal songwriter, and only consistent member. He first gained fame as the drummer of the grunge band Nirvana, from 1990 until the band's end in 1994.

In 1986, at age 17, Grohl joined the punk rock band Scream, replacing drummer Kent Stax. After Scream broke up in 1990, Grohl became the drummer for Nirvana. He first appeared on the band's second album, Nevermind (1991). After the 1994 suicide of Kurt Cobain, Nirvana disbanded, and Grohl formed Foo Fighters as a one-man project. After he released the album Foo Fighters in 1995, he assembled a full band to tour and record under the Foo Fighters name. They have since released 12 studio albums.

Grohl is also the drummer and co-founder of the rock supergroup Them Crooked Vultures, and has recorded and toured with Queens of the Stone Age and Tenacious D. He has organized side projects Late!, which released the album Pocketwatch, and Probot. Grohl began directing Foo Fighters music videos in 1997. He released his debut documentary, Sound City, in 2013, followed by the 2014 documentary miniseries Sonic Highways and the 2021 documentary film What Drives Us. In 2021, Grohl released an autobiography, The Storyteller: Tales of Life and Music. In 2022, he and the Foo Fighters starred as themselves in the comedy horror film Studio 666.

In 2016, Rolling Stone ranked Grohl the 27th-best drummer of all time. Grohl was inducted into the Rock and Roll Hall of Fame as part of Nirvana in 2014 and as a member of Foo Fighters in 2021.

== Early life ==
Grohl was born in Warren, Ohio, on January 14, 1969, the son of teacher Virginia Jean (née Hanlon) and newswriter James Harper Grohl. He is of German, Slovak (on his father's side), Irish, and English (on his mother's side) descent. His father, James, was a journalist and the special assistant to U.S. Senator Robert Taft Jr. James was described as "a talented political observer who possessed the ability to call every major election with uncanny accuracy". When he was a child, Grohl's family moved to Springfield, Virginia. When he was seven, his parents divorced, and he was subsequently raised by his mother. At the age of 12, he began learning to play guitar. He grew tired of lessons and instead taught himself, eventually playing in bands with friends. He said, "I was going in the direction of faster, louder, darker while my sister, Lisa, three years older, was getting seriously into new wave territory. We'd meet in the middle sometimes with Bowie and Siouxsie and the Banshees."

At 13, Grohl and his sister spent the summer at their cousin Tracey's house in Evanston, Illinois. Tracey introduced them to punk rock by taking the pair to shows by a variety of punk bands. His first concert was Naked Raygun at The Cubby Bear in Chicago in 1982. Grohl recalled, "From then on we were totally punk. We went home and bought Maximumrocknroll and tried to figure it all out." In Virginia, he attended Thomas Jefferson High School as a freshman, and was elected class vice president. In that capacity, he managed to play pieces of songs by punk bands like Circle Jerks and Bad Brains over the school intercom before his morning announcements. His mother decided he should transfer to Bishop Ireton High School in Alexandria because his cannabis use was lowering his grades. He stayed there for two years, beginning with a repeat of his first year. After his second year, he transferred yet again to Annandale High School. While in high school, he played in several local bands, including a stint as guitarist in a band called Freak Baby, and taught himself to play drums. When Freak Baby fired its bass player and reshuffled its lineup, Grohl switched to drums. The reconstituted band renamed itself Mission Impossible.

Grohl said he did not take formal drum lessons; instead, he taught himself how to play the drums by listening to Rush and punk rock. Rush drummer Neil Peart was an early influence: "When I got 2112 when I was eight years old, it fucking changed the direction of my life. I heard the drums. It made me want to become a drummer." During his developing years as a drummer, Grohl cited John Bonham as his greatest influence, and eventually had Bonham's three-rings symbol tattooed on his right shoulder. Mission Impossible rebranded themselves Fast before breaking up, after which Grohl joined the hardcore punk band Dain Bramage in December 1985. In March 1987, Dain Bramage ended when Grohl quit without warning to join Scream, having produced the I Scream Not Coming Down LP. Many of Grohl's early influences were at the 9:30 Club, a music venue in Washington, D.C. In April 2010, he said, "I went to the 9:30 Club hundreds of times. I was always so excited to get there, and I was always bummed when it closed. I spent my teenage years at the club and saw some shows that changed my life."

== Career ==
=== Scream (1986–1990) ===
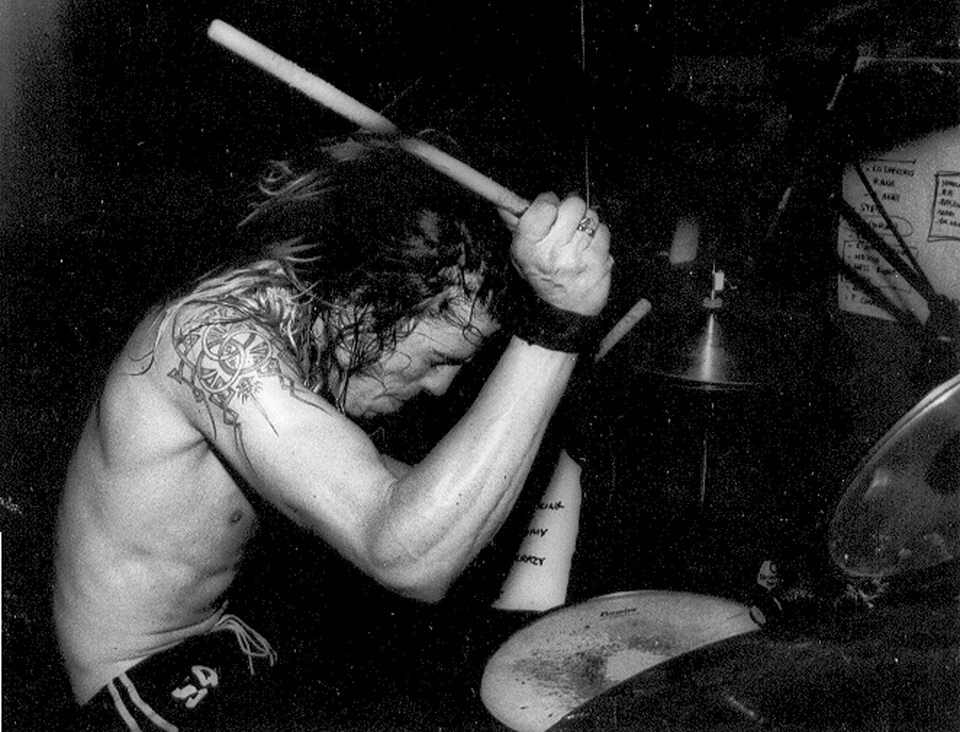
Grohl with Scream in 1989

As a teenager in Washington, D.C., Grohl briefly contemplated joining Gwar, a shock rock band that was seeking a drummer. At age 17, he auditioned for the local band Scream after the departure of the drummer, Kent Stax. Grohl lied about his age, claiming he was older. To his surprise, the band asked him to join, so he dropped out of high school in his junior year. He said: "I was 17 and extremely anxious to see the world, so I did it."

Over the next four years, Grohl toured extensively with Scream, recording a live album (their show of May 4, 1990, in Alzey, Germany, being released by Tobby Holzinger as Your Choice Live Series Vol.10) and two studio albums, No More Censorship and Fumble, for which Grohl wrote and sang "Gods Look Down". During a Toronto stop on their 1987 tour, Grohl played drums for Iggy Pop at a CD release party held at El Mocambo. In 1990, Scream unexpectedly disbanded mid-tour following the departure of their bassist, Skeeter Thompson.

=== Nirvana (1990–1994) ===
While playing in Scream, Grohl became a fan of the Melvins and eventually befriended them. During a 1990 tour stop on the West Coast, the Melvins guitarist Buzz Osborne took his friends Kurt Cobain and Krist Novoselic, members of Nirvana, to see a Scream performance. In October 2010, Grohl told Q, "I remember being in the same room with them and thinking, 'What? That's Nirvana? Are you kidding?' Because on their record cover they looked like psycho lumberjacks... I was like, 'What, that little dude and that big motherfucker? You're kidding me.'" Following the breakup of Scream, Grohl called Osborne for advice. Osborne informed him that Nirvana was seeking a drummer, and gave Grohl the phone numbers of Cobain and Novoselic, who invited Grohl to Seattle to audition. Grohl soon joined.

Nirvana had already recorded several demos for the follow-up to their 1989 debut album, Bleach, and had spent time recording with the producer Butch Vig in Wisconsin. Initially, the plan was to release the album on Sub Pop, but Nirvana received a great deal of interest based on the demos. Grohl spent the initial months with Nirvana traveling to various labels to discuss record deals, and signed with DGC Records.

In early 1991, the band entered Sound City Studios in Los Angeles to record Nevermind, which is depicted in Grohl's 2013 documentary Sound City. Nevermind (1991) exceeded all expectations and became a worldwide commercial success. At the same time, Grohl was compiling and recording his own material, which he released on a cassette, Pocketwatch in 1992, on the indie label Simple Machines. Grohl released the cassette under the pseudonym "Late!"

In the later years with Nirvana, Grohl's songwriting contributions to the band increased. In Grohl's initial months in Olympia, Washington, Cobain overheard him working on the song "Color Pictures of a Marigold", and the two subsequently worked on it together. Grohl later recorded the song for the Pocketwatch cassette. Grohl said in a 2014 episode of Foo Fighters: Sonic Highways that Cobain reacted by kissing him upon first hearing a demo of "Alone + Easy Target" that Grohl had recently recorded.

During the sessions for In Utero, Nirvana rerecorded "Color Pictures of a Marigold" and released it as a B-side on the "Heart-Shaped Box" single, retitled "Marigold". Grohl also contributed the riff for "Scentless Apprentice". Cobain said in a 1993 interview with MTV that he initially thought the riff was "kind of boneheaded", but was gratified at how the song developed, a process captured in part in a demo on the Nirvana box set With the Lights Out. Cobain said that he was excited at the possibility of having Novoselic and Grohl contribute more to the band's songwriting.

Prior to Nirvana's 1994 European tour, the band scheduled session time at Robert Lang Studios in Seattle to work on demos. For most of the three-day session, Cobain was absent, so Novoselic and Grohl worked on demos of their own songs. They completed several of Grohl's songs, including the future Foo Fighters songs "Exhausted", "Big Me", "February Stars", and "Butterflies". Cobain arrived on the third day, and the band recorded a demo of "You Know You're Right". It was Nirvana's final studio recording before the suicide of Cobain on April 5, 1994. On April 10, 2014, Grohl was inducted into the Rock and Roll Hall of Fame as a member of Nirvana.

=== Foo Fighters (1994–present) ===
==== Initial post-Nirvana activity ====
Following Cobain's death, Grohl went into isolation and retreated for several months, unsure of what to do next, and moved to County Kerry, Ireland. In a 2022 interview, Grohl said:

I was still in Seattle, and I just felt, "I gotta get out." I [had to] go somewhere where I could just disappear and sort through my life, and try to figure out what to do next... I was winding around these country roads – so beautiful – and I was finding peace… and I come upon this hitchhiker, and I was considering picking him up, and I saw that he had a Kurt Cobain T-shirt. And to me that meant: "You can't outrun this thing, so it's time … to push through and find some sort of continuation." So I flew home and I immediately started recording those Foo Fighters songs.

— Dave Grohl

In October 1994, he scheduled studio time at Robert Lang Studios and quickly recorded a fifteen-track demo. With the exception of a single guitar part on "X-Static" played by Greg Dulli of the Afghan Whigs, Grohl performed all of the instruments himself.

Grohl wondered if his future might be in drumming for other bands. In November, Grohl took a brief turn with Tom Petty and the Heartbreakers, including a performance on Saturday Night Live. He declined an invitation to become Petty's permanent drummer. Grohl was also rumored as a possible replacement for Pearl Jam drummer Dave Abbruzzese and performed with the band for a song or two at three shows during Pearl Jam's March 1995 Australian tour. However, by then, Pearl Jam had already settled on ex-Red Hot Chili Peppers drummer Jack Irons, and Grohl had other solo plans.

==== 1994–1996 ====
After his demo received interest from major labels, Grohl was signed by Gary Gersh, Nirvana's A&R rep-turned-president of Capitol Records. Grohl did not want the effort to be considered the start of a solo career, so he recruited other band members: former Germs and touring Nirvana guitarist Pat Smear and two members of the recently disbanded Sunny Day Real Estate: William Goldsmith (drums) and Nate Mendel (bass). He and Novoselic decided against Novoselic joining; Grohl said it would have felt "really natural" for them to work together again, but would have been uncomfortable for the other band members and placed more pressure on Grohl. Grohl's demo was remixed by Rob Schnapf and Tom Rothrock and released in July 1995 as Foo Fighters' self-titled debut album. During a break between tours, the band entered the studio and recorded a cover of Gary Numan's "Down in the Park". In February 1996, Grohl and his then-wife Jennifer Youngblood made a brief cameo appearance on The X-Files third-season episode "Pusher".

After touring for the self-titled album for more than a year, Grohl returned home and began work on the soundtrack to the 1997 movie Touch. Grohl performed all of the instruments and vocals himself, save for vocals from Veruca Salt singer Louise Post on the title track, keyboards by Barrett Jones (who also co-produced the record) on one track, and vocals and guitar by X's John Doe on "This Loving Thing (Lynn's Song)". Grohl completed the recording in two weeks and immediately joined Foo Fighters to work on their follow-up.

During the initial sessions for Foo Fighters' second album, tension emerged between Grohl and drummer Goldsmith. Goldsmith said, "Dave had me do 96 takes of one song, and I had to do 13 hours' worth of takes on another one...It just seemed that everything I did wasn't good enough for him, or anyone else". Goldsmith also believed that Capitol and producer Gil Norton wanted Grohl to drum on the album. With the album seemingly complete, Grohl headed home to Virginia with a copy of the rough mixes and found himself unhappy with the results. He wrote and recorded a few new songs, "Walking After You" and the hit single "Everlong", alone at a studio in Washington, D.C. Inspired by the session, Grohl opted to move the band, without Goldsmith's knowledge, to Los Angeles to re-record most of the album with Grohl on drums. After the sessions were complete, Goldsmith announced his departure from the band, and was replaced by former Alanis Morissette drummer Taylor Hawkins. Grohl later expressed regret, and said, "There were a lot of reasons it didn't work out, but there was also a part of me that was like, you know, I don't know if I'm finished playing the drums yet".

The album was released in May 1997 as The Colour and the Shape. It produced several singles, including "Everlong", "My Hero", and "Monkey Wrench", and cemented Foo Fighters as a staple of rock radio.

The following September, Smear left the band, citing a need to settle down after a lifetime of touring. Smear was replaced by Grohl's former Scream bandmate Franz Stahl. Stahl departed before the band recorded its third album and was replaced by touring guitarist Chris Shiflett, who later became a full-fledged member during the recording of One by One.

==== 1999–2005 ====
Grohl's life of non-stop touring and travel continued with Foo Fighters' popularity. During his infrequent pauses, he lived in Seattle and Los Angeles before returning to Alexandria, Virginia. It was there that he turned his basement into a recording studio where the 1999 album There Is Nothing Left to Lose was recorded. It was recorded following the departure from Capitol and their former president, Gary Gersh. Grohl described the recording experience as "intoxicating at times" because the band members were left completely to their own devices. He added, "One of the advantages of finishing the record before we had a new label was that it was purely our creation. It was complete and not open to outside tampering."

In 2000, the band recruited Queen guitarist Brian May to add some guitar flourish to a cover of Pink Floyd's "Have a Cigar", a song which Foo Fighters previously recorded as a B-side. The friendship between the two bands resulted in Grohl and Taylor Hawkins being asked to induct Queen into the Rock and Roll Hall of Fame in 2001. Grohl and Hawkins joined May and Queen drummer Roger Taylor to perform "Tie Your Mother Down", with Grohl standing in on vocals for Freddie Mercury. May later contributed guitar work for the song "Tired of You" on the ensuing Foo Fighters album, as well as on an unreleased Foo Fighters song called "Knucklehead".

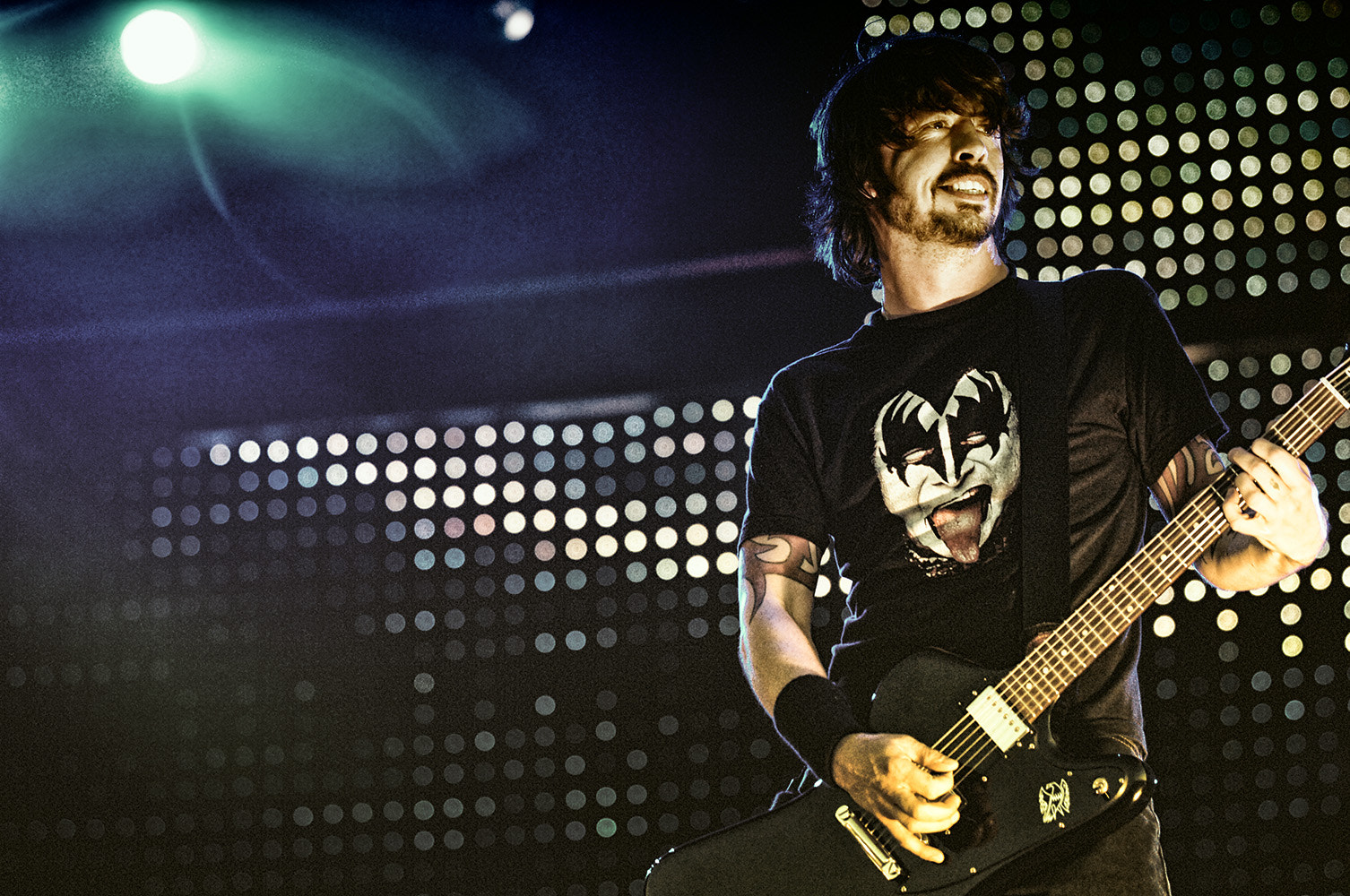
Grohl performing in 2005

Near the end of 2001, Foo Fighters returned to the studio to work on their fourth album. After four months in the studio, with the sessions finished, Grohl accepted an invitation to join Queens of the Stone Age and helped them to record their 2002 album Songs for the Deaf. (Grohl can be seen drumming for the band in the video for the song "No One Knows".) After a brief tour through North America, Britain, and Japan with the band and feeling rejuvenated by the effort, Grohl recalled the other band members to completely re-record their album at his studio in Virginia. The effort became their fourth album, One by One.

On November 23, 2002, Grohl achieved a historical milestone by replacing himself on the top of the Billboard modern rock chart, when "You Know You're Right" by Nirvana was replaced by "All My Life" by Foo Fighters. When "All My Life" ended its run, after a one-week respite, "No One Knows" by Queens of the Stone Age took the number one spot. Between October 26, 2002, and March 1, 2003, Grohl was in the number one spot on the Modern rock charts for 17 of 18 successive weeks, as a member of three different groups.

==== 2005–2009 ====
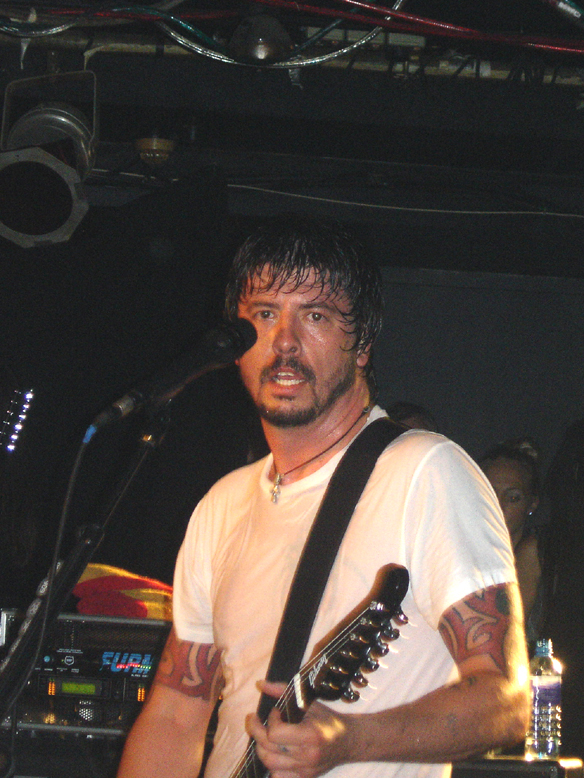
Grohl performing in 2006

Grohl and Foo Fighters released their fifth album In Your Honor on June 14, 2005. Prior to starting work on the album, the band spent almost a year relocating Grohl's home-based Virginia studio to a brand new facility, dubbed Studio 606, located in a warehouse in Northridge, Los Angeles. Featuring collaborations with John Paul Jones of Led Zeppelin, Josh Homme of Queens of the Stone Age and Norah Jones, the album was a departure from previous efforts, and included one rock and one acoustic disc.

Foo Fighters' sixth studio album Echoes, Silence, Patience & Grace was released on September 25, 2007. It was recorded during a three-month period between March 2007 and June 2007, and its release was preceded by the first single "The Pretender" on September 17. The second single, "Long Road to Ruin", was released on December 3, 2007, followed by the third single, "Let It Die", on June 24, 2008.

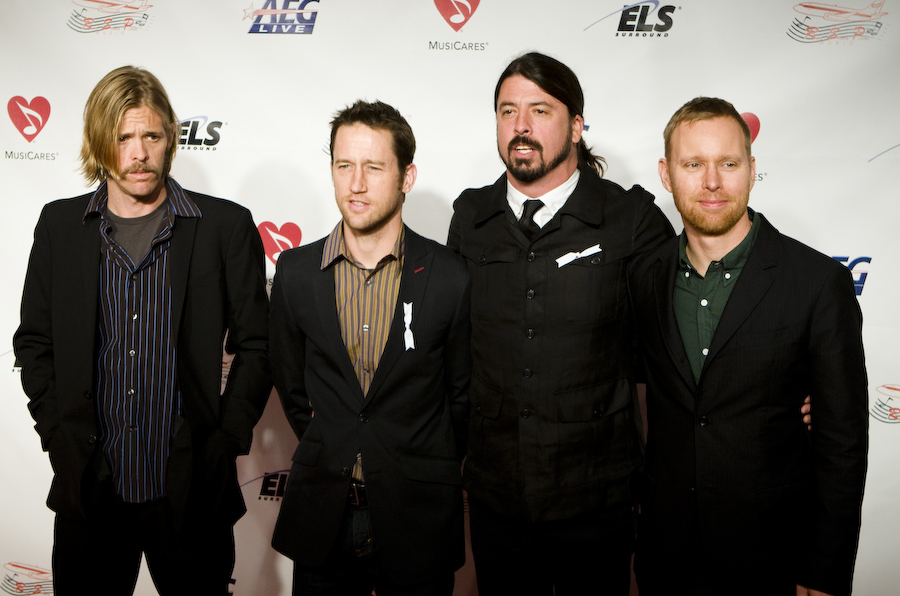
Foo Fighters in 2009; from left to right: Hawkins, Shiflett, Grohl, Mendel

On November 3, 2009, Foo Fighters released their first Greatest Hits collection, consisting of 16 tracks including a previously unreleased acoustic version of "Everlong" and two new tracks "Wheels" and "Word Forward" which were produced by Nevermind's producer Butch Vig. Grohl said he felt the Greatest Hits was too early and "can look like an obituary". He did not feel they had written their best hits yet.

==== 2010–2014 ====
Foo Fighters' seventh studio album, Wasting Light, was released on April 12, 2011. It became the band's first album to reach No. 1 in the United States. Despite rumors of a hiatus, Grohl confirmed in January 2013 that the band had completed writing material for their follow-up to Wasting Light.

Grohl and members of Foo Fighters sometimes perform as a cover band "Chevy Metal", as they did in May 2015 at "Conejo Valley Days", a county fair in Thousand Oaks, California.

On November 10, 2014, Foo Fighters released their eighth studio album, Sonic Highways, which reached number two in the United States. The album features eight songs, each inspired by a different U.S. city's musical history and culture researched by Grohl himself.

==== 2015–present ====
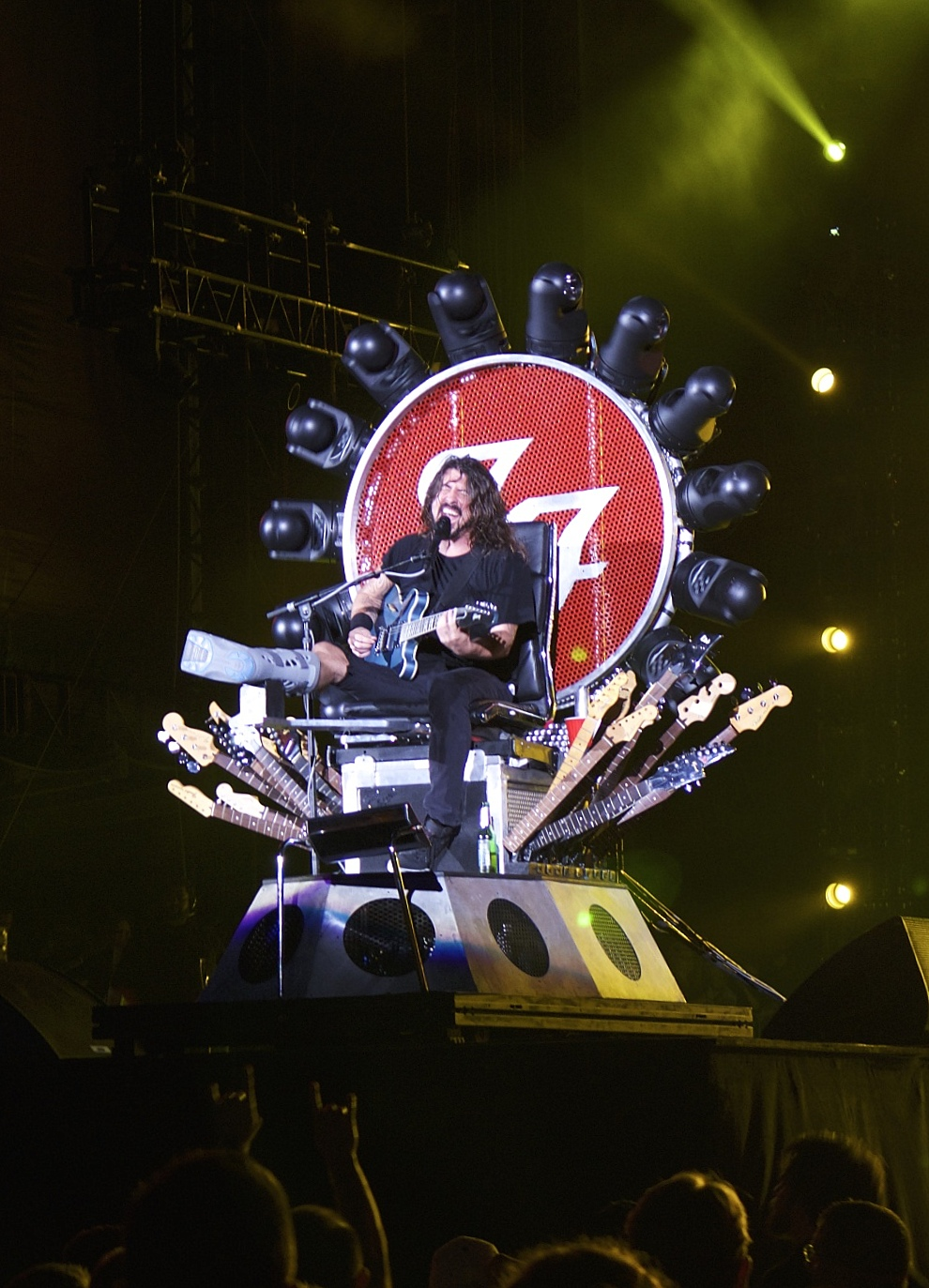
Grohl performing with a broken leg in July 2015

On June 12, 2015, while playing a show in Gothenburg, Sweden, Grohl fell off the stage, breaking his leg. He left temporarily and returned with a cast to finish the concert. Afterward, the band canceled the remainder of its European tour. To avoid having to cancel the band's upcoming North American tour, Grohl designed a large "elevated throne" which would allow him to perform on stage with a broken leg. The throne was unveiled at a concert in Washington, D.C., on July 4, where Grohl used the stage's video screens to show the crowd video of him falling from the stage in Gothenburg as well as X-rays of his broken leg. Beginning with the show on July 4, Foo Fighters began selling new tour merchandise rebranding the band's North American tour as the Broken Leg Tour. In 2016, Grohl lent his throne to Axl Rose of Guns N' Roses after Rose broke his foot. He lent it again in 2021 to Darin Wall, of the Seattle metal band Greyhawk, after Wall was shot in the leg.

On July 31, 2015, Grohl posted a personal reply to Fabio Zaffagnini, Marco Sabiu, and the 1,000 participants of the "Rockin' 1000" project in Cesena, Italy, thanking them for their combined performance of the Foo Fighters' song "Learn to Fly", indicating (in broken Italian), "... I promise [Foo Fighters will] see you soon". On November 3, Foo Fighters performed in Cesena, where Grohl invited some "Rockin' 1000" members onto the stage to perform with the band.

On September 15, 2017, Foo Fighters released their ninth studio album Concrete and Gold, which became the band's second album to debut at number one on the Billboard 200. After the Concrete and Gold Tour, Grohl announced that the band would be taking a break. The tenth Foo Fighters studio album, Medicine at Midnight, was released on February 5, 2021, following delays due to the COVID-19 pandemic. It debuted at number three on the Billboard 200. The Medicine at Midnight tour was canceled following the death of Hawkins on March 25, 2022. The eleventh Foo Fighters studio album But Here We Are was released on June 2, 2023. The album is dedicated to Hawkins and Grohl's mother, Virginia, both of whom died in 2022.

On April 10, 2026, the Foo Fighters released a new single, "Of All People", from their 12th studio album, Your Favorite Toy, released on April 24, 2026.

== Other work ==
=== Musical projects and contributions ===
Grohl frequently participates in music projects apart from his main bands. In 1992, he played drums on Buzz Osborne's Kiss-styled solo-EP King Buzzo; he was credited as "Dale Nixon", a pseudonym that Greg Ginn adopted to play bass on Black Flag's My War. He also released the music cassette Pocketwatch under the pseudonym Late! on the now-defunct indie label Simple Machines.

In 1993, Grohl was recruited to help recreate the music of the Beatles' early years for the movie Backbeat. In 1993–94, he played drums in the Backbeat Band, an alternative rock supergroup that also included Greg Dulli of the Afghan Whigs, indie producer Don Fleming, Mike Mills of R.E.M., Thurston Moore of Sonic Youth, and Dave Pirner of Soul Asylum.

In 1994, Grohl played drums on two tracks for Mike Watt's Ball-Hog or Tugboat?. In early 1995, Grohl and Foo Fighters played their first US tour: the Ring Spiel Tour, opening for Watt and also playing, alongside Eddie Vedder, in Watt's supporting band.

In January 1997, Grohl played a few songs with David Bowie for Bowie's 50th birthday concert at Madison Square Garden.

In the early 2000s, Grohl spent time in his basement studio writing and recording several songs for Probot, a heavy metal music project, recruiting his favorite metal vocalists from the 1980s, including Lemmy of Motörhead, Conrad Lant from Venom, King Diamond, Scott Weinrich, Snake of Voivod and Max Cavalera of Sepultura. Probot released an album in 2004.

In 2003, Grohl stepped behind the kit to perform on Killing Joke's second self-titled album. This surprised some fans of Nirvana, which had been accused of plagiarizing the opening riff of "Come as You Are" from Killing Joke's 1984 song "Eighties". However, the controversy failed to create a lasting rift between the bands. Foo Fighters covered Killing Joke's "Requiem" during the late 1990s, and were joined by Killing Joke singer Jaz Coleman for a performance of the song at a show in New Zealand in 2003. Also in 2003, at the 45th Annual Grammy Awards, Grohl performed in an ad hoc supergroup with Bruce Springsteen, Elvis Costello, and Steven Van Zandt in tribute to the recently deceased singer/guitarist Joe Strummer.

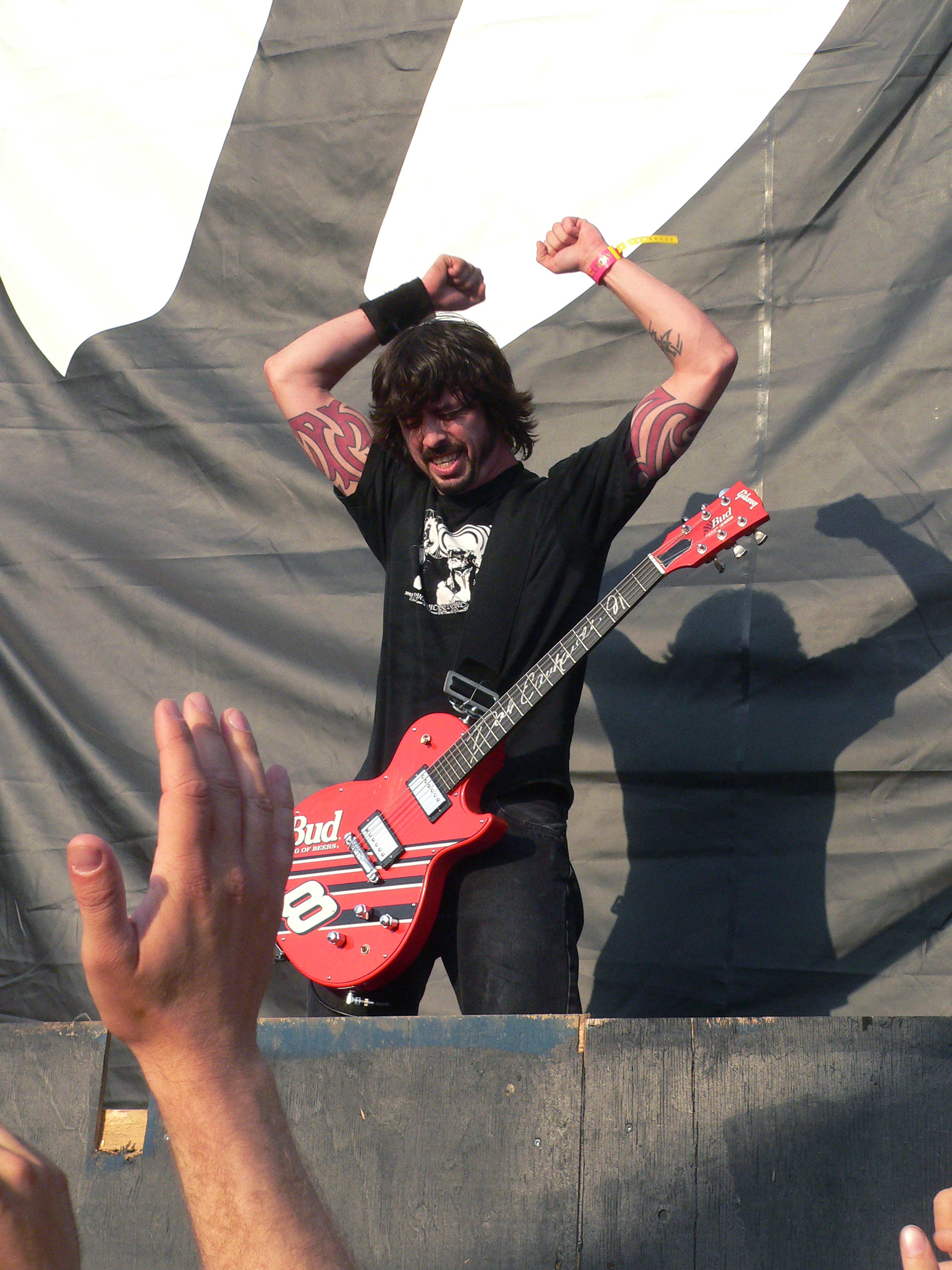
Grohl in 2005

Grohl lent his drumming skills to other artists during the early 2000s. In 2000, he played drums and sang on a track, "Goodbye Lament", for Tony Iommi's album Iommi. In 2001, Grohl performed on Tenacious D's debut album, and appeared in the video for lead single "Tribute" as a demon. He later appeared in the duo's 2006 movie Tenacious D in The Pick of Destiny as the devil in the song "Beelzeboss (The Final Showdown)", and performed on its soundtrack. He also performed drums for their 2012 album Rize of the Fenix. In 2002, Grohl helped Chan Marshall of Cat Power on the album You Are Free and played with Queens of the Stone Age on their album Songs for the Deaf. Grohl also toured with the band in support of the album, delaying work on the Foo Fighters' album One by One. In 2004, Grohl drummed on six tracks for Nine Inch Nails' 2005 album With Teeth and played percussion on one more, later returning to play drums on 'The Idea of You' from their 2016 EP Not the Actual Events. He also drummed on the song "Bad Boyfriend" on Garbage's 2005 album Bleed Like Me. Most recently, he recorded all the drums on Juliette and the Licks's 2006 album Four on the Floor and the song "For Us" from Pete Yorn's 2006 album Nightcrawler. Beyond drumming, Grohl contributed guitar to a cover of Neil Young's "I've Been Waiting For You" on David Bowie's 2002 album Heathen.

In June 2008, Grohl was Paul McCartney's special guest for a concert at the Anfield football stadium in Liverpool, in one of the central events of the English city's year as European Capital of Culture. Grohl joined McCartney's band singing backup vocals and playing guitar on "Band on the Run" and drums on "Back in the U.S.S.R." and "I Saw Her Standing There". Grohl also performed with McCartney at the 51st Annual Grammy Awards, again playing drums on "I Saw Her Standing There". Grohl also helped pay tribute to McCartney at the 2010 Kennedy Center Honors along with No Doubt, Norah Jones, Steven Tyler, James Taylor, and Mavis Staples. He sang a duet version of "Maybe I'm Amazed" with Norah Jones on December 5, 2010.

Grohl played drums on the tracks "Run with the Wolves" and "Stand Up" on the Prodigy's 2009 album Invaders Must Die.

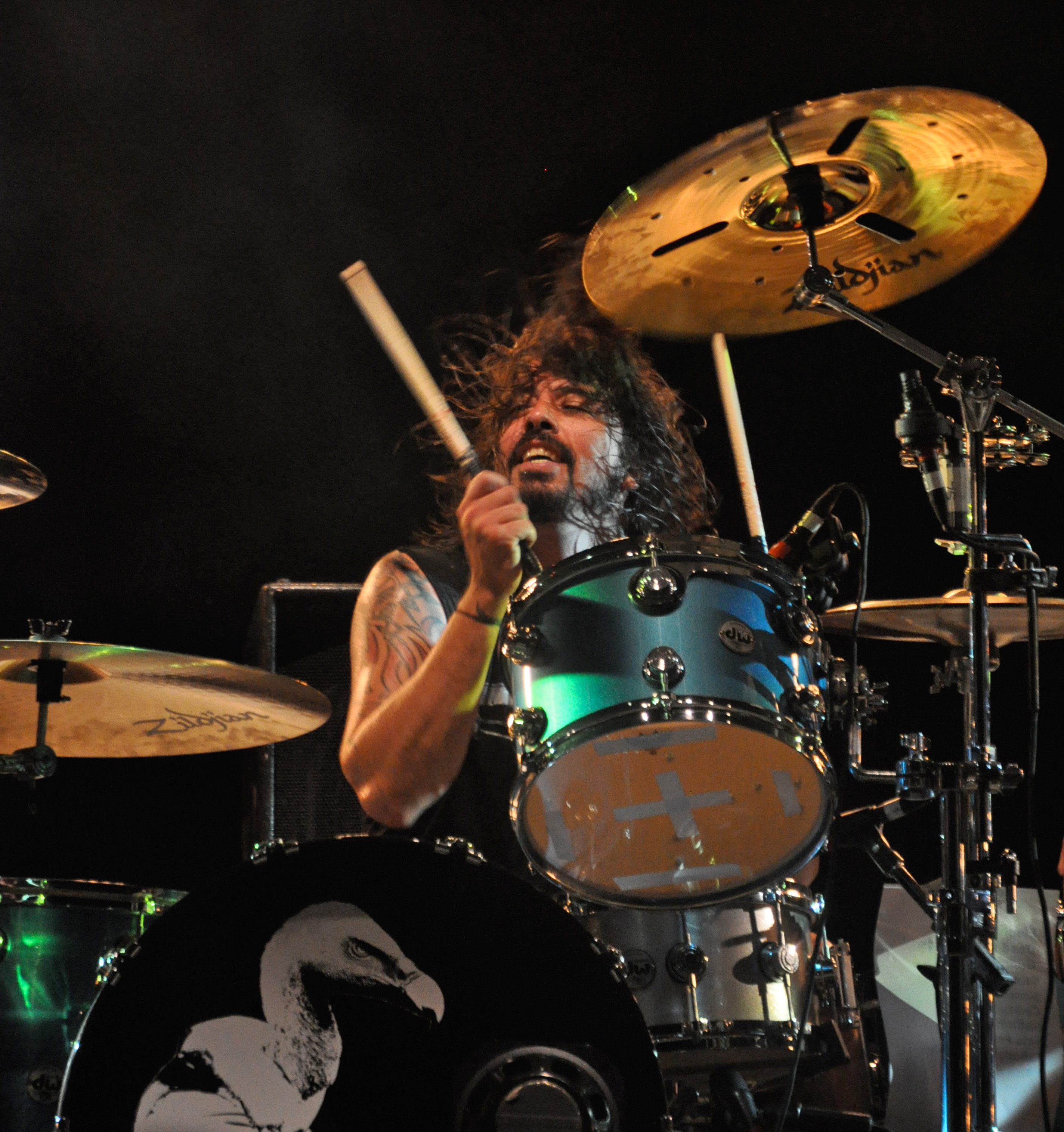
Grohl drumming for Them Crooked Vultures

In July 2009, Grohl along with Josh Homme and John Paul Jones formed a supergroup, Them Crooked Vultures. The trio performed their first show together on August 9, 2009, at Metro in Chicago. The band played their first UK gig on August 26, 2009, with a surprise appearance at Brixton Academy in London, supporting the Arctic Monkeys. The band released their debut album Them Crooked Vultures on November 16, 2009, in the UK and November 17, 2009, in the US.

On October 23, 2010, Grohl performed with Tenacious D at BlizzCon. He appeared as the drummer for the entire concert, and a year later, he returned with Foo Fighters and played another set there, this time as guitarist and vocalist.

Also in 2010, Grohl helped write and perform on drums for "Watch This" with guitarist Slash and Duff McKagan on Slash's self-titled album that also included many other famous artists.

In October 2011, Grohl temporarily joined Cage the Elephant as a replacement on tour after drummer Jared Champion's appendix burst.

Grohl directed a documentary entitled Sound City (2013), which is about the Van Nuys studio of the same name where Nevermind was recorded, that shut down its music operations in 2011.

In 2012, following the departure of Joey Castillo from Queens of the Stone Age, Grohl performed on some tracks as drummer on their 2013 album ...Like Clockwork.

At 12-12-12: The Concert for Sandy Relief, Paul McCartney joined Grohl and the surviving members of Nirvana (Krist Novoselic and touring guitarist Pat Smear) to perform "Cut Me Some Slack", a song later recorded for the Sound City soundtrack. In what was regarded as a Nirvana reunion with McCartney as a stand-in for Kurt Cobain, this was the first time in eighteen years that the three had played alongside each other.

On March 14, 2013, Grohl delivered a keynote speech at the 2013 South by Southwest conference in Austin, Texas. He described his musical life from youth through to the Foo Fighters and emphasized the importance of each individual's voice: "There is no right or wrong—there is only your voice ...What matters most is that it's your voice. Cherish it. Respect it. Nurture it. Challenge it. Respect it." Grohl said during the speech that Psy's "Gangnam Style" was one of his favorite songs of the past decade. He also said Edgar Winter's instrumental "Frankenstein" was the song that made him want to become a musician.

On November 6, 2013, Grohl played drums at the 2013 Country Music Association Awards, replacing drummer Chris Fryar in the Zac Brown Band. The band debuted their new song "Day for the Dead". Grohl also produced Zac Brown Band's EP The Grohl Sessions, Vol. 1.

Grohl worked closely with indie hip-hop band RDGLDGRN on their EP. While Grohl was filming his Sound City documentary, the group asked the fellow native of Northern Virginia to drum on "I Love Lamp". Grohl wound up drumming for the entire record, with the exception of "Million Fans", which features a sampled breakbeat.

Grohl, a fan of the theatrical Swedish metal band Ghost, produced their EP If You Have Ghost. He was also featured in a number of songs on the EP. Grohl played rhythm guitar for the song "If You Have Ghosts" (a cover of a Roky Erickson song), and drums on "I'm a Marionette" (an ABBA cover) as well as "Waiting for the Night" (a Depeche Mode cover). According to a member of Ghost, Grohl has appeared live in concert with the band wearing the same identity-concealing outfit that the rest of the band usually wears.

In September, the all-star covers album by the Alice Cooper-led Hollywood Vampires supergroup was released and features Grohl playing drums on the medley "One/Jump Into the Fire".

On August 10, 2018, Grohl released "Play", a solo recording lasting over 22 minutes. A mini-documentary accompanied it. That same year, Grohl invited ten-year-old Collier Cash Rule on stage at a Foo Fighters concert in Kansas City, Missouri, and gave him his guitar. Rule played several Metallica songs, and Grohl sang one verse and the chorus to "Enter Sandman".

Between August and November 2020, Grohl participated in an online drum battle with ten-year-old drummer Nandi Bushell, who had released cover versions of Nirvana and Foo Fighters songs on her YouTube channel, then challenged the elder drummer to a contest. After going back and forth with Bushell a few times, Grohl jokingly conceded victory to her and wrote and performed a song in her honor. Grohl invited Bushell to perform with the Foo Fighters on stage during their August 26, 2021, show at the L.A. Forum, where she played drums on "Everlong", the show's finale. The videos of the drum battle received tens of millions of views.

During Hanukkah of 2020, Grohl collaborated with Greg Kurstin to release previously recorded covers of songs by Jewish artists under the moniker The Hanukkah Sessions, one per night. This continued in 2021 and 2022.

On October 5, 2021, Grohl's memoir The Storyteller: Tales of Life and Music was published by Dey Street Books. Grohl developed a thrash metal record for a fictional band named Dream Widow (who self-destructed 25 years ago), as developed for a horror-comedy movie titled Studio 666. Grohl worked to create the Dream Widow album and aimed to release it at the same time as the film, on February 25, 2022. On March 25, 2022, the self-titled Dream Widow EP was released to digital streaming services featuring eight tracks ranging from thrash, death and extreme metal. The EP also featured Rami Jaffee, Jim Rota, and Oliver Roman.

On June 25, 2022, Grohl duetted with Paul McCartney when he headlined the Glastonbury Festival. It was his first performance since the death of Taylor Hawkins earlier in the year.

=== Television ===
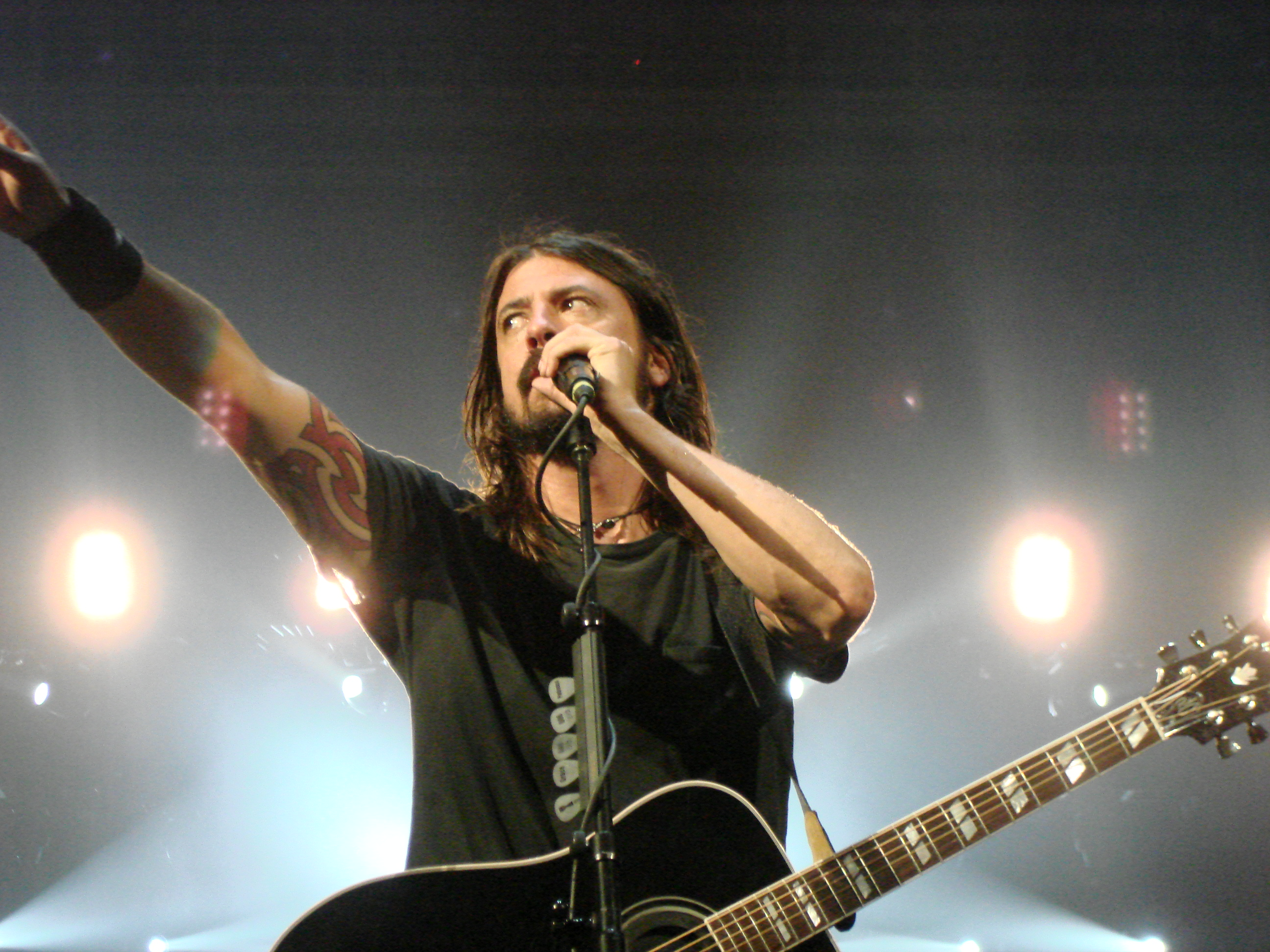
Grohl in July 2008

Since his first appearance in 1992, Grohl has been a musical guest on Saturday Night Live 15 times—more than any other musician. He has appeared with Nirvana, Foo Fighters, Them Crooked Vultures, Mick Jagger, and Tom Petty and the Heartbreakers.

Grohl has also appeared in several sketches on SNL. On October 13, 2007, he performed in the SNL Digital Short "People Getting Punched Just Before Eating". On February 6, 2010, he appeared as a middle-aged punk rock drummer reuniting the group "Crisis of Conformity" (fronted by Fred Armisen) after 25 years in a skit later on in the episode. On April 9, 2011, he appeared in the SNL Digital Short "Helen Mirren's Magical Bosom" and the sketch "Bongo's Clown Room".

In mid-2010, Grohl added his name to the list of contributing rock star voice cameos for Cartoon Network's heavy metal parody/tribute show, Metalocalypse. He voiced the controversial Syrian dictator, Abdule Malik, in the season 3 finale, Doublebookedklok.

In February 2013, Grohl filled in as host of Chelsea Lately for a week. Guests included Elton John, who disclosed on the E! show that he would appear with Grohl on the next Queens of the Stone Age album. Grohl had previously hosted the show during the first week of December 2012 as part of "Celebrity Guest Host Week".

On May 20, 2015, David Letterman selected Grohl and the Foo Fighters to play "Everlong" as the last musical guest on the final episode of Late Show with David Letterman. On December 1, 2015, Grohl appeared on an episode of The Muppets where he competed in a "drum off" with Animal.

Grohl appeared in the 50th anniversary season of Sesame Street in February 2019. On January 28, it was announced that the first authorized Dave Grohl documentary will be released via The Coda Collection. On October 8, Grohl was the guest storyteller on CBeebies Bedtime Story, reading a story based on the Beatles song "Octopus's Garden".

=== Filmmaking ===
Grohl directed the Foo Fighters music videos for "Monkey Wrench" (1997), "My Hero" (1998), "All My Life" (2002), "White Limo" (2011), and "Rope" (2011), as well as all the music videos from the Sonic Highways and Concrete and Gold era. Outside of Foo Fighters, he also filmed the music video for Soundgarden's "By Crooked Steps" (2014).

In 2013, Grohl produced and directed the documentary Sound City, about the history of the famed Sound City Studios recording studios in Van Nuys. The film, Grohl's feature-length directorial debut, premiered at the 2013 Sundance Film Festival.

Accompanying the release of Sonic Highways, Grohl directed an eight-part documentary miniseries of the same name that chronicles the album's development and recording across eight different American cities. It premiered on HBO on October 17, 2014.

In 2021, Grohl directed What Drives Us, a feature-length documentary on van touring. It was released on April 30, 2021, on the Coda Collection via Amazon Prime.

=== Cal Jam ===
Inspired by California Jam, to celebrate the release of Foo Fighters' ninth studio album Concrete and Gold and begin their North American tour, Cal Jam 17, a music festival curated by Grohl and Foo Fighters, was held from October 6–7, 2017 at Glen Helen Amphitheater, with 27,800 attendees, 3,100 campers, and nine arrests. Cal Jam 18, held October 5–6, 2018 in San Bernardino, California, featured the Foo Fighters and a Nirvana reunion.

== Musicianship and equipment ==
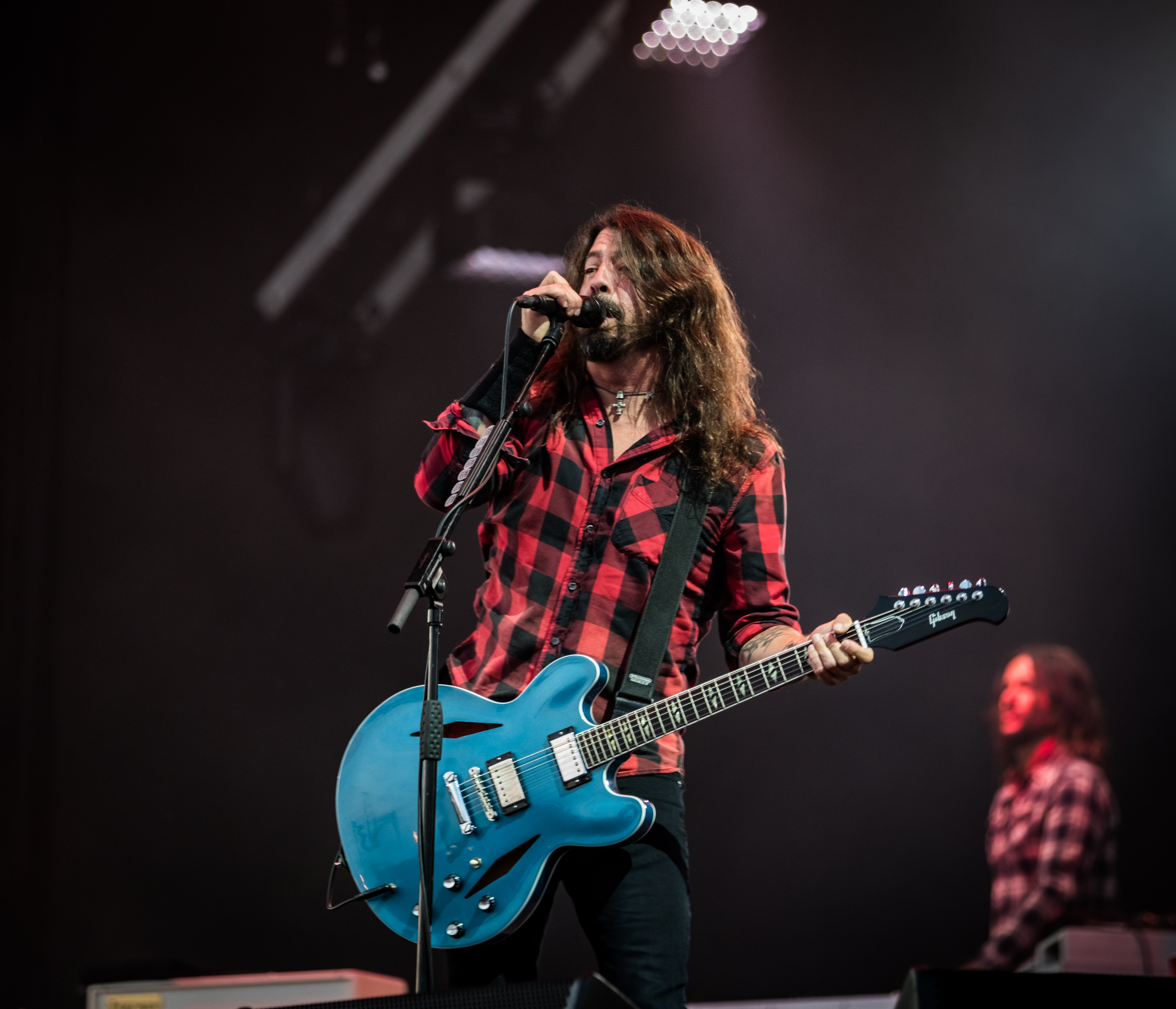
Grohl with his signature Gibson DG-335 guitar in 2018

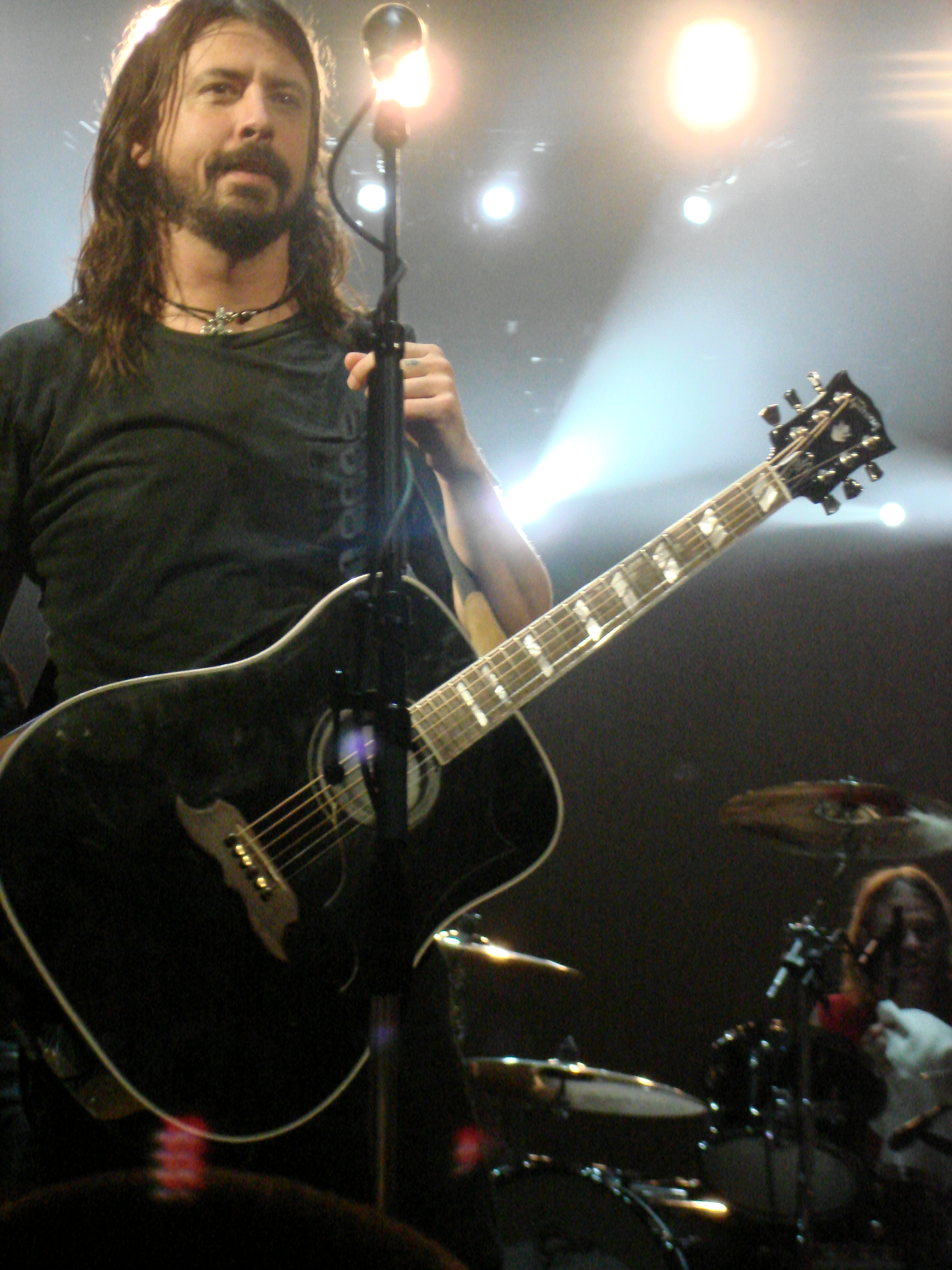
Dave Grohl with his Gibson Dove acoustic guitar in 2008

Grohl is a self-taught musician and cannot read musical notation, and instead plays only by ear. His drum kit, designed by Drum Workshop, features five different sized tom-tom drums ranging from 5x8 inches to 16x18 inches, a 19-inch crash cymbal, two 20-inch crash cymbals, an 18-inch China cymbal, a 24-inch ride cymbal, and a standard kick drum, snare drum, and hi-hat.

Grohl's primary recording guitar is an original cherry red Gibson Trini Lopez Standard that he bought in the early 1990s, while still with Nirvana, because he liked the different style of headstock and the diamond-shaped sound holes on what was otherwise an ES-335. Onstage during early Foo Fighters tours, Grohl played two Gibson Les Pauls, then relied primarily on a pair of black Gibson Explorers while touring for The Colour and the Shape, There is Nothing Left to Lose, and One by One.

Since 2017, Grohl's primary stage guitar has been his signature model Pelham Blue Gibson DG-335, which was designed by Gibson based on the Trini Lopez Standard specs, but in different colors, with a stop tailpiece instead of the Trini Lopez's trapeze tailpiece and PAF-style "Burstbucker" pickups. For the Foo Fighters' return in 2023, Grohl also began playing a DG-335 in a white finish, matching the aesthetics of But Here We Are. His primary acoustic guitar is a black Elvis Presley model Gibson Dove.

On early Foo Fighter records, Grohl used a 100-watt Marshall JCM800 amplifier along with a ProCo TurboRAT distortion pedal. He added a Boss DM-2 delay effect pedal and an MXR Micro Amp for the band's follow-up album. From There is Nothing Left to Lose onwards, Grohl has used a Vox AC30 for clean and slightly-overdriven tones and a succession of Mesa/Boogie amplifiers for fully distorted sounds. These included the Maverick and Heartbreaker models, and later on the Dual Rectifier Road King. After Wasting Light, Grohl added Fender Tonemaster and Hot Rod Deluxe models to his rig. Effects pedals he has added in the new millennium include the Electro-Harmonix Deluxe Memory Man delay, MXR Phase 90, and Xotic Effects EP Booster.

== Advocacy, philanthropy and views ==
In May 2006, Grohl sent a note of support to the two trapped miners in the Beaconsfield mine collapse in Tasmania, Australia, who had survived the initial rockfall. In the initial days following the collapse, one of the men requested an iPod with the Foo Fighters album In Your Honor. In October 2006, one of the miners took up his offer, joining Grohl for a drink after a Foo Fighters acoustic concert at the Sydney Opera House. Following the event, Grohl wrote "Ballad of the Beaconsfield Miners", an instrumental piece, which was included on Foo Fighters' 2007 release Echoes, Silence, Patience & Grace, and features Kaki King.

He has worn a White Knot ribbon, a symbol of support for same-sex marriage, to various events; when questioned about the knot, he responded, "I believe in love and I believe in equality and I believe in marriage equality." Grohl's gay rights activism dates back to the early 1990s, when Nirvana performed at a benefit to raise money to fight Oregon Ballot Measure 9, which forbade governments in Oregon from promoting or facilitating homosexuality. Grohl participated in two counter-protests against the Westboro Baptist Church for their anti-gay stance: in 2011, by performing "Keep It Clean" on the back of a flatbed truck and in 2015, by Rickrolling them.

Despite growing up with a firearm, Grohl is an advocate for gun control. In a 2008 interview, Grohl said he had never used cocaine, heroin, or speed, and that he had stopped smoking cannabis and taking LSD at the age of 20. He contributed to a 2009 anti-drug video for the BBC. He has described himself as a coffee addict who drinks an average of six cups of coffee every morning; in 2009, he was admitted to a hospital with chest pains caused by a caffeine overdose.

Grohl supported Barack Obama's 2012 presidential campaign and performed "My Hero" at the 2012 Democratic National Convention in Charlotte, North Carolina. Foo Fighters supported Joe Biden's 2020 presidential campaign and played at the "Celebrating America" concert during Biden's inauguration in 2021. In 2018, he said that Donald Trump "seems like a massive jerk". After Trump used the band's song "My Hero" at a rally in 2024 without their permission, a Foo Fighters spokesperson announced that the band would donate any royalties from the usage to the Kamala Harris 2024 presidential campaign.

== Personal life ==
In 1994, Grohl married Jennifer Leigh Youngblood, a photographer from Grosse Pointe, Michigan. They separated in December 1996 and divorced in 1997; Grohl admitted to infidelity. After divorcing Youngblood, Grohl briefly dated snowboarder Tina Basich. Basich ended the relationship after discovering his infidelity. From 1999 to 2001, Grohl dated former Hole bassist Melissa Auf der Maur. In 2003, he married Jordyn Blum; they had met at the Sunset Marquis Whiskey Bar in West Hollywood, California. They reside in Los Angeles and have three daughters, born in 2006, 2009, and 2014. In September 2024, Grohl announced that he had fathered a daughter outside his marriage and asked his family for forgiveness. In March 2025, it was reported that Blum was willing to forgive Grohl and they were working on saving their marriage.

In a June 2011 interview, Grohl revealed that he was going deaf in his left ear due to decades of performing on stage. During his appearance on The Howard Stern Show in February 2022, he stated that he has hearing loss and that this has an impact on both his daily life and life as a musician; his tinnitus has forced him to read lips for about 20 years, a situation that became more difficult when people began wearing face masks during the COVID-19 pandemic. When playing, he refuses to use in-ear monitors despite their ability to protect his ears because it "removes you from the natural atmosphere sound".

In 2012, Stereogum estimated Grohl as the third-wealthiest drummer, behind Ringo Starr and Phil Collins, with a fortune of $260 million. From 1993 to 1997, Grohl owned a house in Shoreline, Washington. In 2015, Grohl sold his 3,088-square-foot (286.9 m^{2}) beachfront house in Oxnard, California, for $2.9 million.

== Honors ==
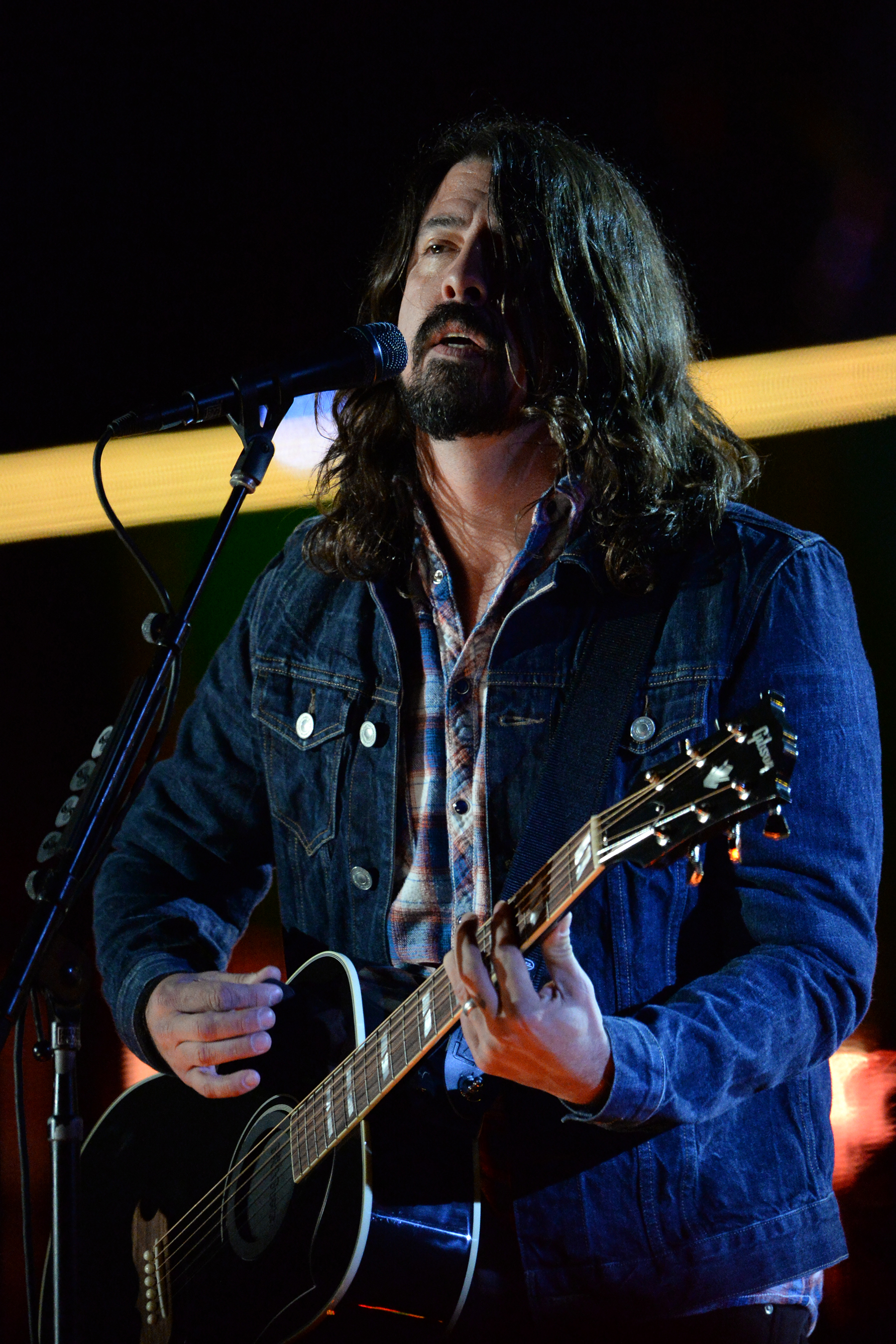
Grohl at The Concert for Valor in 2014

In August 2009, Grohl was given the key to the city of Warren, Ohio, his birthplace, and performed the songs "Everlong", "Times Like These", and "My Hero". A roadway in downtown Warren named "David Grohl Alley" has been dedicated to him with murals by local artists.

In 2012, Grohl's hometown of Warren unveiled oversized 902 lb (409 kg) drumsticks, listed in the Guinness Book of World Records for the largest drumsticks in the world. They were also displayed on July 7, 2012, at a concert at the Warren Amphitheater. Grohl's first solo Rolling Stone cover story was published on December 4, 2014. In 2016, Grohl was ranked 27th on the list of the best drummers of all time by Rolling Stone. Grohl received the George and Ira Gershwin Award in 2024.

== Discography ==
Solo

- Pocketwatch (1992; as Late!)
- Probot (2004; as Probot)

with Scream

- No More Censorship (1988)
- Fumble (1993)

with Nirvana

- Nevermind (1991)
- In Utero (1993)

with Foo Fighters

- Foo Fighters (1995)
- The Colour and the Shape (1997)
- There Is Nothing Left to Lose (1999)
- One by One (2002)
- In Your Honor (2005)
- Echoes, Silence, Patience & Grace (2007)
- Wasting Light (2011)
- Sonic Highways (2014)
- Concrete and Gold (2017)
- Medicine at Midnight (2021)
- But Here We Are (2023)
- Your Favorite Toy (2026)

with Queens of the Stone Age

- Songs for the Deaf (2002)

with Them Crooked Vultures

- Them Crooked Vultures (2009)

== Filmography ==
=== Film ===
Year	Film	Role	Notes
1992	1991: The Year Punk Broke	Himself	Documentary
2000	Is It Fall Yet?	Daniel Dotson	Voice only
2005	Classic Albums: Nirvana – Nevermind	Himself	Documentary
2006	Tenacious D in The Pick of Destiny	Satan	Performed drums, vocals, guitar
2007	Runnin' Down a Dream	Himself	Documentary
2010	Lemmy	Himself	Rockumentary
2011	The Muppets	Animool	Cameo
2011	Foo Fighters: Back and Forth	Himself	Rockumentary
2012	See a Little Light: A Celebration of the Music and Legacy of Bob Mould	Himself	Performed guitar, drums, vocals
2012	Bad Brains: A Band in DC	Himself	Documentary
2013	Sound City	Director	Documentary
2013	The Death and Resurrection Show	Himself	Documentary
2013	Filmage: The Story of Descendents/All	Himself	Documentary
2014	Salad Days	Himself	Documentary
2014	Rye Coalition: The Story of the Hard Luck 5	Himself	Documentary
2015	Kurt Cobain: Montage of Heck	Himself (Archival Footage)	Documentary
2015	All Things Must Pass	Himself	Documentary
2016	Desert Age: A Rock and Roll Scene History	Himself	Documentary
2016	The Smart Studios Story	Himself	Documentary
2018	Industrial Accident: The Story of Wax Trax! Records	Himself	Documentary
2020	Bill & Ted Face the Music	Himself	Cameo
2021	I'm in the Band	Himself	Documentary
2021	What Drives Us	Director	Documentary
2022	Studio 666	Himself	Horror film, also story

=== Television ===
Year	Series	Role	Notes
1996	The X-Files	Man walking down hallway	Uncredited cameo; Episode: "Pusher"
1996	Space Ghost Coast to Coast	Himself	Episode: "Late Show"
2004	Viva La Bam	Himself	Episode: "Drive-Way Skate Park"
2005	Classic Albums	Himself	Episode: "Nirvana: Nevermind"
2006	The West Wing	Himself	Episode: "Election Day Part II"
2008	Top Chef: New York	Himself	Episode: "A Foo Fighters Thanksgiving"
2010	Metalocalypse	Abdule Malik	Voice; Episode: "Doublebookedklok"
2013	Behind the Music: Remastered	Himself	Episode: "Motörhead"
2013–16	Drunk History	Memphis Mafia Member / American Congressman	2 episodes
2013	The High Fructose Adventures of Annoying Orange	Himself	Episode: "Meet Banana Monocle"
2013	Chelsea Lately	Himself	Guest host
2014	Sonic Highways	Himself	8 episodes
2014	Off Camera	Himself	
2015	The Muppets	Himself	Episode: "Going, Going, Gonzo"
2017	Jimmy Kimmel Live!	Himself	Guest host
2019	Sesame Street	Himself	Performed vocals and guitar
2021	CBeebies Bedtime Story	Himself	Performed vocals and guitar
2021	From Cradle to Stage	Host	6 episodes
2021	Biography: KISStory	Himself	2 episodes
2022	Hot Ones	Himself	Webisode: "Dave Grohl Makes a New Friend While Eating Spicy Wings"

== Bibliography ==
- Hämäläinen, Jyrki (2020). Killing Joke: Are You Receiving? (1st ed.). London: New Haven Publishing. ISBN 9781912587407. OCLC 1190832462.
- Grohl, David Eric (2021). The Storyteller: Tales of Life and Music (1st ed.). New York City: William Morrow and Company. ISBN 9780063076099. OCLC 1268472534.
