= Robert Lee Davidson =

- Also known as: RLee
- Genres: Punk rock, hardcore
- Occupation: Guitarist
- Instruments: Guitar, vocals

Robert Lee Davidson (also known as RLee) is an American guitarist known for playing in the hardcore punk band Scream. In the 80's, Davidson gained recognition playing in the D.C. hardcore band Scream recording albums This Side Up, Banging The Drum, and No More Censorship. On December 28, 1996, Davidson reunited for a show with Scream at The Black Cat in Washington, DC and recorded a live record on Torque Records.

Davidson later went on to play with The Drills in Los Angeles, California. In the summer of 1998, Davidson formed the short lived band Festival of Fools. In 1999, Davidson did a European tour with the Baltimore-based punk band Jakkpot in support for their album Lie! Cheat! 'N Steal!. He later formed the band God Is Dead. Davidson has done humanitarian work in East Africa with The Kenyan Relief Organization.

== Personal life ==
Davidson is married and lives in Indian Rocks Beach, Florida.
