= Skeeter Thompson =

American bassist

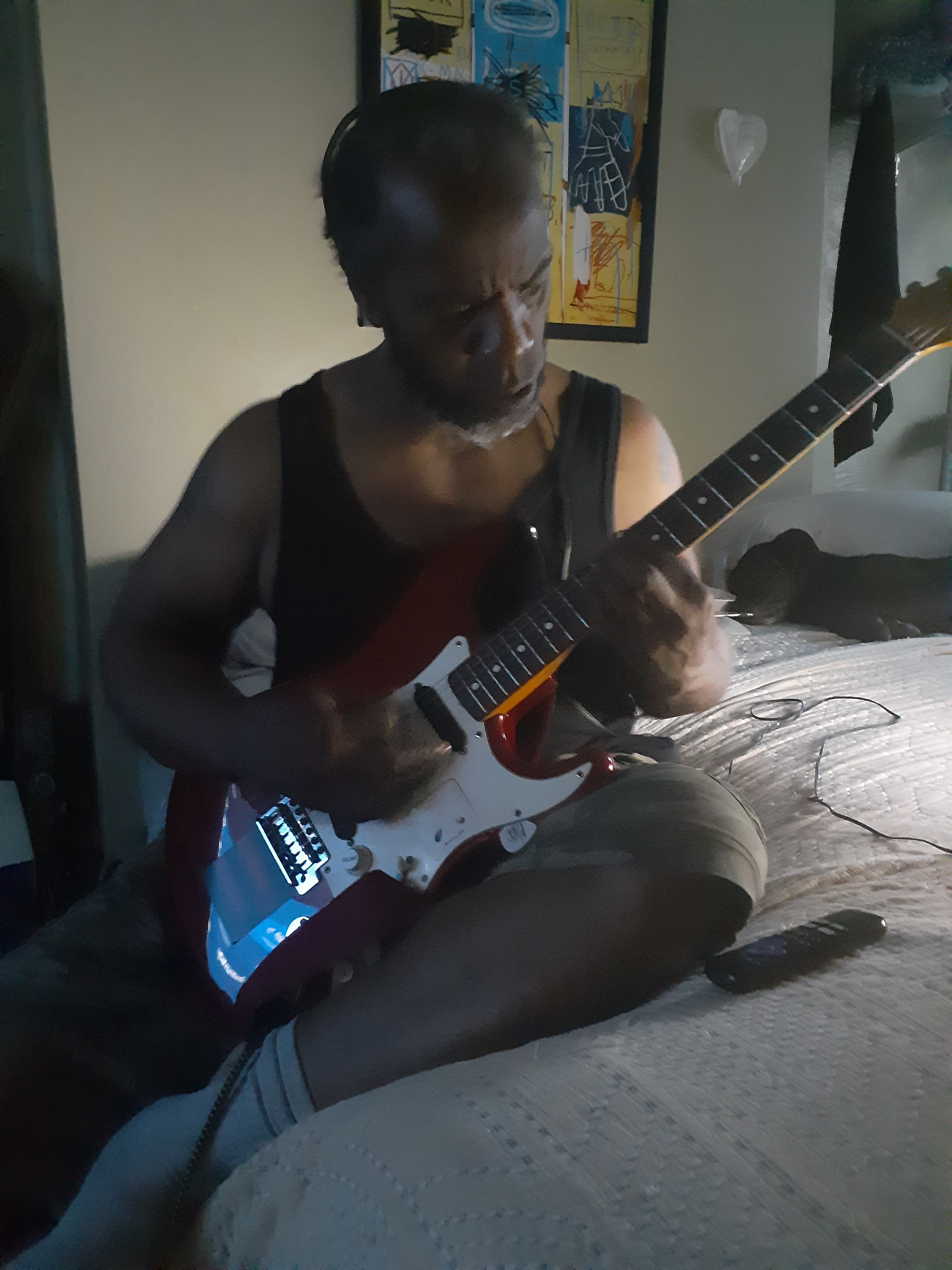
- Thompson in 2021

Background information
- Birth name: Enoch Thompson
- Instrument(s): Bass, guitar, vocals
- Member of: Scream

Enoch "Skeeter" Thompson is an American musician, best known for being the bassist of the DC hardcore band Scream.

After their initial breakup, Thompson moved to Little Rock, Arkansas. While there, he played in several local bands including old school punk band Springgun. Upon his return to Northern Virginia in 2008, he continued to collaborate with a host of local musicians as Fallout Shelter, Tommy Models, Rise Defy, Soylent Green and more. Forty years on, he continues as bassist for Scream.

In 2018, Thompson recorded his first solo album, The Book of Enoch in E Minor. In early 2020, he relocated to upstate New York just ahead of the pandemic. After a year of contemplation and solo practice, 2021 found him involved in several new projects in Troy, NY, (most notably as co-founder of Electric Skychurch Talent Review) as well as completing the recording of DC Special with Scream at Inner Ear Studios with Don Zientara.
