= UK Foo Fighters =

Foo Fighters Tribute Band

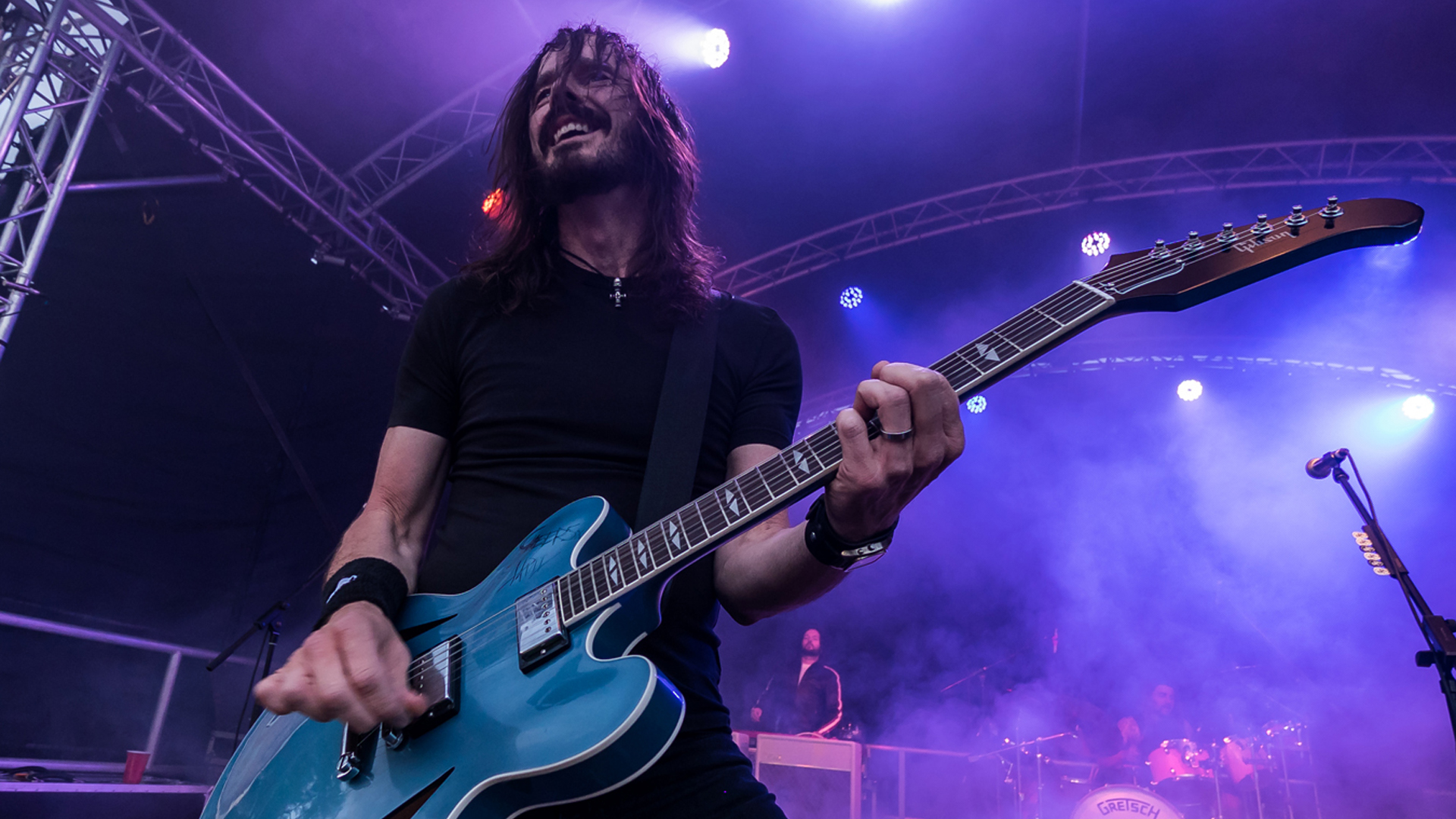
- UK Foo Fighters live show at Trentham Gardens, Stoke, United Kingdom.

Background information
- Origin: Harrogate, North Yorkshire, UK
- Genres: Hard rock
- Years active: 2007 to present
- Members: Jay Apperley; Ollie Button; Hurricane Henderson; Ricky Collins; James Wade; Joseph Phipps-Pearson
- Website: ukfoofighters.co.uk

UK Foo Fighters is a Foo Fighters tribute band, formed in Harrogate, North Yorkshire, UK in 2007.

== History ==
UK Foo Fighters originated from a Harrogate covers band called Speedsta that gained popularity between 2004 and 2007, playing tracks from bands such as Nirvana, Green Day, Red Hot Chili Peppers, The White Stripes, QOTSA and Stereophonics. The covers of Foo Fighters resonated with audiences and eventually attracted the attention of local promoters and festival organisers. The first ticketed show as a tribute band to Foo Fighters was at a small nightclub called Daddy Cools in Knaresborough, North Yorkshire. After a period of playing local gigs and festivals from 2007 to 2012, the band was invited to tour further afield in 2013 at various O2 Academy venues throughout the UK, owned and operated by the Academy Music Group.

On 10 September 2014 at Concorde2 in Brighton, Dave Grohl invited UK Foo Fighters frontman 'Jay Apperley' to perform 'White Limo' off the Foo Fighters album 'Wasting Light'.

On 29 March 2015, Rolling Stone magazine reported on the iHeartRadio Music Awards 10 Best and Worst Moments. Best Wish Fulfilment Fantasy; "Many performances were punctuated by short video interviews where accomplished artists recounted their "journey." The best anecdote came courtesy of the Foo Fighters, who told the story of a European gig attended by a tribute band called UK Foo Fighters. Exhausted from the tour, Dave Grohl recognized his British counterpart in the crowd and invited him onstage to perform "White Limo." Apparently, the guy killed it."

In June 2015, Foo Fighters were forced to pull shows in London, Edinburgh, and Glastonbury Festival due to a broken leg that frontman Dave Grohl had sustained. UK Foo Fighters were approached to play London & Edinburgh dates. Gigwise reported, "already booked a train to see Foo Fighters? Here’s the solution: tribute band UK Foo Fighters will play next door for you.” NME reported, “Foo Fighters tribute band book charity gigs next door to Wembley Stadium for disappointed fans."

On 9 June 2017, BBC Music released three short films for BBC iPlayer in the run-up to the Glastonbury Festival, each one featuring tribute acts to the three Glastonbury headliners that year: Foo Fighters, Radiohead and Ed Sheeran. The first was entitled ‘My Hero: UK Foo Fighters’ featuring the UK Foo Fighters tribute band.

On 15 June 2018, UK Foo Fighters played the ‘Opening Ceremony’ performance for the WUKF World Karate Championships in front of thousands at Dundee Ice Arena.

On 28 September 2019 – UK Foo Fighters performed at the 92nd UCI Road World Championships 2019 alongside Jarvis Cocker, The Pigeon Detectives, Litany and The Feeling.

On 4 November 2019, by invitation, UK Foo Fighters entered BBC Maida Vale Studios in London to record a live session with the infamous Simon Askew.

On 14 March 2022, UK Foo Fighters kicked off their 2022 tour and 15th anniversary at the city's venue, with a near-sell-out crowd in high spirits throughout the evening.

On 4 March 2024, London's O2 Academy Brixton announced reopening on Friday 19 April with Nirvana UK (tribute to Nirvana) and The Smyths (tribute to The Smiths), followed by Friday 26 April with Definitely Mightbe (tribute to Oasis) and UK Foo Fighters (tribute to Foo Fighters).

On 4 July 2025, after 15+ years of incredible progress from small bars to headlining tours at 02 Academy venues across Britain, Jay and the UK Foo Fighters now boast their own brilliantly made film which was released on July 4th, the day the real Foo Fighters celebrated the 30th anniversary of their debut album. An intimate look at UK Foo Fighters journey through two of the most legendary music venues in history: Abbey Road Studios and The Cavern Club. While paying homage to their namesake, Foo Fighters, the documentary also highlights the profound impact of The Beatles on the band members’ personal and musical lives.

== Band members ==
Current members

- Jay Apperley (as Dave Grohl) – vocals, guitar (2007–present)
- Ollie Button (as Taylor Hawkins) – drums, vocals (2020–present)
- Hurricane Henderson (as Chris Shiflett) – guitar, vocals (2020–present)
- Ricky Collins (as Pat Smear) – guitar (2021–present)
- James Wade (as Rami Jaffee) – piano, accordion (2022–present)
- Joseph Phipps-Pearson (as Nate Mendel) – bass guitar (2023–present)

Former members

- Arron Warner – bass guitar (2007–2019)
- Jamie Valentine – guitar, vocals (2010–2020)
- Alex Bailey – drums, vocals (2010–2020)
- Nick Wight – keyboards (2013–2020)
- Gareth Jenkinson – bass guitar (2019–2022)

Other musicians

- Paul Winn – harmonica
- Sarah Collins – vocals
- Katie Lofthouse – vocals
- Alice Barrott – vocals
- Natalie Rawel – vocals
- Abby Chapman – vocals
- Leanne Stenson – vocals
- Zoe Mayers – vocals
- Hannah Robinson – vocals
