= These Days (Foo Fighters song) =

Single by Foo Fighters

from the album Wasting Light
- Released: November 1, 2011
- Genre: Alternative rock; post-grunge
- Length: 4:58
- Label: RCA
- Songwriters: Dave Grohl; Taylor Hawkins; Nate Mendel; Chris Shiflett; Pat Smear
- Producer: Butch Vig

Foo Fighters singles chronology
"Arlandria" (2011)	"These Days" (2011)	"Bridge Burning" (2012)

Music video
- These Days on YouTube

"These Days" is the fourth single (fifth in the United Kingdom) from American rock band Foo Fighters' seventh studio album Wasting Light. It was written by Dave Grohl and co-produced by Butch Vig. Dave Grohl has stated that it is his favorite song that he has ever written. On August 18, 2012, the Foo Fighters performed "These Days" at Pukkelpop, as a tribute to the people who either died or were injured there a year earlier, due to a violent thunderstorm that raged over the festival grounds.

== Music video ==
The official video was released on January 30, 2012. The video featured live shots from their June 2011 Milton Keynes performances, Australian and New Zealand tour. It was directed by Wayne Isham.

== Reception ==
The writers of Rolling Stone magazine named it the fourth best single of the year. As of April 9, 2012 "These Days" spent sixteen weeks on the Australian Singles Chart, and was certified gold in Australia.

== Charts ==
=== Weekly charts ===
Chart (2011–2012)	Peak position
Australia (ARIA)	60
Belgium (Ultratip Bubbling Under Flanders)	10
Canada Hot 100 (Billboard)	63
Canada Rock (Billboard)	1
Czech Republic Modern Rock (IFPI)	8
Mexico Ingles Airplay (Billboard)	37
UK Singles (OCC)	169
UK Rock & Metal (Official Charts)	4
US Bubbling Under Hot 100 (Billboard)	11
US Hot Rock & Alternative Songs (Billboard)	2

=== Year-end charts ===
Chart (2012)	Position
US Hot Rock Songs (Billboard)	2

== Certifications ==
Region	Certification	Certified units/sales
Australia (ARIA)	Platinum	70,000^{‡}
New Zealand (RMNZ)	Gold	7,500^{*}
United Kingdom (BPI)	Silver	200,000^{‡}
^{*} Sales figures based on certification alone.^{‡} Sales+streaming figures based on certification alone.
