= Arlandria (song) =

Single by Foo Fighters

from the album Wasting Light
- Released: September 18, 2011 (United Kingdom only)
- Recorded: September 6–December 21, 2010 in Dave Grohl's garage
- Genre: Alternative rock; post-grunge; hard rock
- Length: 4:28
- Label: RCA
- Songwriters: Dave Grohl; Taylor Hawkins; Nate Mendel; Chris Shiflett; Pat Smear
- Producer: Butch Vig

Foo Fighters singles chronology
"Walk" (2011)	"Arlandria" (2011)	"These Days" (2011)

Music video
- "Arlandria" on YouTube

"Arlandria" is a song by American rock band Foo Fighters, released from their seventh studio album Wasting Light on September 18, 2011, as the fourth single in the United Kingdom.

== Song information ==
The title is a reference to Arlandria, the Alexandria, Virginia, neighborhood where Dave Grohl lived. The lyrics include a reference to "Rain Rain Go Away," which Dave Grohl justified by saying "there's something about the singsong cadence of children's music that has its place in rock."

Arlandria is also referenced in the song "Headwires" off their 1999 album There Is Nothing Left to Lose. At the end of that song, Grohl repeats the phrase "The sun is on Arlandria".

== Music video ==
The first official music video used to promote the song was a live performance taken from the iTunes Festival London 2011, performed at the Roundhouse, London, UK.

On 22 June 2019 a second music video was released through the band's YouTube channel. It depicts a man being chased around San Francisco at 3 a.m. by a group of costumed vigilantes and a neighborhood watch after being mistaken for a burglar who ran past him when he left a bar. The video was released alongside three other videos for songs from Wasting Light, as well as a video for "The One".

== Personnel ==
Foo Fighters

- Dave Grohl – vocals, rhythm guitar
- Taylor Hawkins – drums
- Nate Mendel – bass
- Chris Shiflett – lead guitar
- Pat Smear – guitar, baritone guitar

Additional musician

- Drew Hester – percussion

Production

- Butch Vig – production
- Foo Fighters – production
- James Brown – engineer
- Alan Moulder – mixing
- Joe LaPorta – mastering
- Emily Lazar – mastering

== Charts ==
Chart (2011)	Peak position
Scotland Singles (Official Charts)	72
UK Singles (Official Charts)	79
UK Rock & Metal (Official Charts)	1

== Certifications ==
Region	Certification	Certified units/sales
Australia (ARIA)	Gold	35,000^{‡}
Brazil (Pro-Música Brasil)	Gold	30,000^{‡}
New Zealand (RMNZ)	Gold	15,000^{‡}
^{‡} Sales+streaming figures based on certification alone.
