= Bridge Burning =

Single by Foo Fighters

from the album Wasting Light
- Released: June 5, 2012
- Recorded: September 6–December 21, 2010 in Dave Grohl's garage
- Genre: Post-grunge; hard rock
- Length: 4:46
- Label: RCA
- Songwriters: Dave Grohl; Taylor Hawkins; Nate Mendel; Chris Shiflett; Pat Smear
- Producer: Butch Vig

Foo Fighters singles chronology
"These Days" (2011)	"Bridge Burning" (2012)	"Something from Nothing" (2014)

Music video
- "Bridge Burning" on YouTube

"Bridge Burning" is a song by American rock band Foo Fighters. It was released as the fifth and final single from their seventh studio album Wasting Light (2011), and as the sixth and final single in the United Kingdom. It is also the first track on the album. On March 16, 2012, the online music magazine Loudwire announced that Foo Fighters would be releasing "Bridge Burning" as a proper radio single. The song appears on the soundtrack to the video game Madden NFL 12.

== Charts ==
=== Weekly charts ===
Chart (2011–2012)	Peak position
Canada Hot 100 (Billboard)	75
Canada Rock (Billboard)	1
Hungary (Single Top 40)	6
UK Rock & Metal (Official Charts)	14
US Hot Rock & Alternative Songs (Billboard)	22

=== Year-end charts ===
Chart (2012)	Position
US Hot Rock Songs (Billboard)	74
