= Walk (Foo Fighters song) =

2011 single by Foo Fighters

Single by Foo Fighters

from the album Wasting Light
- Released: June 17, 2011
- Recorded: September 6–December 21, 2010 in Dave Grohl's garage
- Genre: Alternative rock; post-grunge; hard rock
- Length: 4:16
- Label: RCA
- Songwriters: Dave Grohl; Taylor Hawkins; Nate Mendel; Chris Shiflett; Pat Smear
- Producer: Butch Vig

Foo Fighters singles chronology
| "White Limo" (2011) | "Walk" (2011) | "Arlandria" (2011) |

Music video
- Walk on YouTube

"Walk" is a song by American rock band Foo Fighters, released as the third single from their seventh studio album Wasting Light. It was written by Dave Grohl and co-produced by Butch Vig.

== Release and reception ==
The song was released on June 6, 2011, to rock radio. No physical CD single was released; it is only a digital downloadable single. The song reached number one on the Billboard Rock Songs chart on July 20, 2011, dethroning the album's previous single "Rope", giving the band their third number one single on the chart - the most on the chart so far. On February 12, 2012, the song won two awards at the 54th Grammy Awards for Best Rock Performance and Best Rock Song. They also performed the song live at the Grammys.

== Song information ==
According to Dave Grohl, he came up with the verse about "having a trial" after the time he was helping his first daughter Violet Maye on "learning to walk", and eventually she was able to walk on her own. The song was supposed to be on the previous studio album Echoes, Silence, Patience & Grace, but Dave decided to put the final version as the last track of Wasting Light because it "sort of makes sense to the album's theme of time and second chances" and to "end the record on a positive note". Grohl added that the optimistic tone was a reminiscence on how bad he felt after Kurt Cobain killed himself and wanting others to realize "in life, you get trapped in crisis, where you imagine there’s no way out. When really, if you dare to consider that crisis a blip on the radar, it’s easier to push through. And, yeah, I was just like, ‘I don’t want anyone to have that feeling that I had that morning.’ ” Pat Smear, who played with Grohl and Cobain in Nirvana, considers "Walk" and its lyrics about enjoying life an antithesis to the Nirvana song "I Hate Myself and Want to Die".

== Music video ==
The music video appeared on YouTube on June 2, 2011. The video, directed by Sam Jones, was the second video released from Wasting Light, and is an homage to Joel Schumacher's 1993 movie Falling Down.

In 2011, the video won Best Rock Video at the 2011 MTV Video Music Awards.

== Personnel ==
Foo Fighters

- Dave Grohl – vocals, rhythm guitar
- Chris Shiflett – lead guitar
- Pat Smear – guitar
- Nate Mendel – bass
- Taylor Hawkins – drums

Additional musician

- Rami Jaffee - organ

Production

- Butch Vig – production
- Foo Fighters – production
- James Brown – engineer
- Alan Moulder – mixing
- Joe LaPorta – mastering
- Emily Lazar – mastering

== Charts ==
=== Weekly charts ===
| Chart (2011) | Peak position |
|---|---|
| Australia (ARIA) | 57 |
| Austria (Ö3 Austria Top 40) | 49 |
| Belgium (Ultratop 50 Flanders) | 25 |
| Belgium (Ultratip Bubbling Under Wallonia) | 34 |
| Canada Hot 100 (Billboard) | 49 |
| Canada Rock (Billboard) | 1 |
| Czech Republic Modern Rock (IFPI) | 19 |
| Japan Hot 100 (Billboard) | 32 |
| Mexico Ingles Airplay (Billboard) | 23 |
| Netherlands (Dutch Top 40) | 31 |
| Netherlands (Mega Top 50) | 22 |
| Netherlands (Single Top 100) | 58 |
| New Zealand (Recorded Music NZ) | 38 |
| Scottish Singles Sales (Official Charts) | 48 |
| Switzerland (Schweizer Hitparade) | 74 |
| UK Singles (Official Charts) | 57 |
| UK Rock & Metal (Official Charts) | 1 |
| US Billboard Hot 100 | 83 |
| US Hot Rock & Alternative Songs (Billboard) | 1 |

| Chart (2021) | Peak position |
|---|---|
| Czech Republic (Modern Rock) | 19 |

=== Year-end charts ===
| Chart (2011) | Position |
|---|---|
| US Hot Rock Songs (Billboard) | 3 |

| Chart (2012) | Position |
|---|---|
| US Hot Rock Songs (Billboard) | 17 |

=== Decade-end charts ===
| Chart (2010–2019) | Position |
|---|---|
| US Hot Rock Songs (Billboard) | 19 |

== Certifications ==
| Region | Certification | Certified units/sales |
|---|---|---|
| Australia (ARIA) | Platinum | 70,000^{‡} |
| Brazil (Pro-Música Brasil) | Platinum | 60,000^{‡} |
| Mexico (AMPROFON) | 2× Platinum | 120,000^{‡} |
| New Zealand (RMNZ) | Platinum | 30,000^{‡} |
| United Kingdom (BPI) | Gold | 400,000^{‡} |
^{‡} Sales+streaming figures based on certification alone.

== Awards ==
| Year | Award | Results |
|---|---|---|
| 2011 | MTV Award for Best Rock Video | Won |
| 2012 | Grammy Award for Best Rock Performance | Won |
| 2012 | Grammy Award for Best Rock Song | Won |
