= Rope (song) =

Single by Foo Fighters

from the album Wasting Light
- Released: March 1, 2011
- Recorded: 2010
- Studio: Dave Grohl's residence (Encino, Los Angeles)
- Genre: Alternative rock; post-grunge; hard rock
- Length: 4:19
- Label: RCA
- Songwriters: Dave Grohl; Taylor Hawkins; Nate Mendel; Chris Shiflett; Pat Smear
- Producers: Foo Fighters; Butch Vig

Foo Fighters singles chronology
"Wheels" (2009)	"Rope" (2011)	"White Limo" (2011)

Music video
- "Rope" on YouTube

"Rope" is a song by American rock band Foo Fighters, the second track on their seventh studio album, Wasting Light (2011). Like the rest of the album, it was written by all band members and produced by the band alongside Butch Vig. The song originated during the tour supporting Echoes, Silence, Patience & Grace (2007), the band's sixth studio album. A demo version was recorded after the tour ended in 2008. Some acts that have been noted as influences on the song include Rush and Led Zeppelin.

"Rope" was released as the lead single of Wasting Light on March 1, 2011, through RCA Records as a download. It was supported by a music video, shot almost entirely in VHS, that paid tribute to the claustrophobic space of the recording studio used for the album. A remix by Canadian producer Deadmau5 was later released as part of a limited edition 12-inch single. "Rope" received favorable reviews from critics and performed well commercially. It was the year-end number-one song of 2011 for the Billboard Rock Songs chart, peaked at No. 68 on the Billboard Hot 100, and reached the top 25 in five countries, including the United Kingdom.

== Composition ==
"Rope" sample

"Rope" had its origins during the Echoes, Silence, Patience and Grace world tour, as frontman Dave Grohl played an acoustic guitar while waiting for the soundchecks or to fly to the next city. After the tour ended in 2008, the song had its first version recorded during sessions at Grand Master Studios in Hollywood. It would later be brought into the Wasting Light songs which were recorded in Grohl's garage.

The song's unusual rhythms and angular chords have a distinct influence from Rush as well as Led Zeppelin's album Presence, which Grohl declared "may be my favorite album of theirs". The main progression of chords is a flat seventh, a fourth and a minor third, warranting guitarist Chris Shiflett to comment that "What my guitar is doing over the bass makes no sense in a way. It does, but you don't know how." The intro is a sequence of minor sevenths with a suspended fourth, going from B minor to D, which Shiflett stated was "kind of illogical, in a way, to your ear", and Grohl himself compared to Television and Mission of Burma. The delay on the intro was induced manually given the album was produced without digital instruments, with producer Butch Vig synchronizing it with the click track through a drum machine and a shake tambourine. As Jeff Miers of The Buffalo News writes, the song "commences like it might end up being a blend of dub and metal, before evolving into arena-friendly hard rock."

== Release ==
The single premiered on radio on February 23, 2011 and was officially released on March 1, 2011. The song was only released as a download single and no physical CD single was actually released. However, a 12-inch vinyl single was released on May 9, 2011.

Canadian electronic producer Deadmau5 produced a remix of the song that was released separately as part of the Deadmau5 Mix Edits EP. It was made available digitally on April 14. The Foo Fighters performed the remix version at the 54th Grammy Awards with Deadmau5, along with "Walk".

The first televised performance of the single was part of a Foo Fighters set at the 2011 NME Awards, at which the band was present for Dave Grohl to collect the 'Godlike Genius' award.

== Music video ==
Pat Smear (left, off-screen), Dave Grohl (center) and Chris Shiflett in the "Rope" music video. The setting was a cubic white set inspired by the "tight, claustrophobic space" on which the album Wasting Light was recorded.

The music video, directed by Grohl, was shot entirely in VHS, and shows the Foo Fighters performing inside a white cube set built inside a soundstage in Los Angeles. The "tight, claustrophobic space" was inspired by Grohl's garage, where Wasting Light was recorded. The first verse and chorus of the song simply show the band performing, while the second verse and chorus show the band as silhouettes, and the instrumental bridge and final chorus shows lights of various colors flashing within the cube.

The music video made its worldwide premiere live from a MTV.com contest winner's house in Los Angeles, CA. An MTV and fan interview from the same house was conducted after the premiere, followed by a Twitter "question and answer" portion.

== Critical reception ==
"Rope" was well received by critics. On its review of the song, Rolling Stone said the single "rides lower to the ground that the usual Foos anthem, especially during the gnarled-guitar fire-fight at the end, without undercutting the modern-rock heroism that's become one of the few reliable guitar-based brands on contemporary radio." Billboard described the song as having "a meaty guitar lick that sounds ripe for Rock Band, a rip-roaring extended instrumental solo and a few choice "Yow!"s from frontman Dave Grohl", praising the "raw, hard-hitting focus" and concluding that "'Rope' makes the listener feel like it's 1995 all over again."

"Rope" was nominated for "Best Rock Track" at the 2011 Teen Choice Awards, and Deadmau5' remix was nominated for a Grammy Award for Best Remixed Recording, Non-Classical. It placed at No. 63 on the Australian Triple J Hottest 100, 2011, the world's largest annual music poll.

== Chart performance ==
The song is only the second in history to debut atop the Rock Songs chart, after "The Catalyst" by Linkin Park in 2010. It also gave the Foo Fighters their second song to top the chart, tying them with Alice in Chains, Three Days Grace and Linkin Park as the only artists with multiple number-ones on the chart (a record that they would break immediately after "Rope" ended its reign at number one). "Rope" spent an unprecedented 20 consecutive weeks on top of the chart, until the July 30 issue, when the album's second single "Walk", took the number one spot. This made the Foo Fighters the first ever artist to have two consecutive number one songs on the chart. "Rope" also charted at number 22 on the UK Singles Chart making it the twenty-first Foo Fighters single to reach the UK Top 40, and as of 2025, remains their last UK Top 40 hit. "Rope" is Foo Fighters' highest-charting single on the Netherlands Singles Chart, charting at number 31.

== Track listing ==
Download

1. "Rope" – 4:19

12-inch vinyl

1. "Rope" (Deadmau5 Mix) – 3:06
2. "Rope" – 4:19

Download – Deadmau5 Mix [edit]

1. "Rope" (Deadmau5 Mix) [edit] – 3:06

== Personnel ==
Foo Fighters

- Dave Grohl – vocals, rhythm guitar
- Taylor Hawkins – drums, vocals
- Nate Mendel – bass
- Chris Shiflett – lead guitar
- Pat Smear – guitar

Additional musician

- Rami Jaffee – keyboards

Production

- Butch Vig – production
- Foo Fighters – production
- James Brown – engineer
- Alan Moulder – mixing
- Joe LaPorta – mastering
- Emily Lazar – mastering

== Charts ==
=== Weekly charts ===
Chart (2011)	Peak position
Australia (ARIA)	55
Austria (Ö3 Austria Top 40)	51
Belgium (Ultratip Bubbling Under Flanders)	7
Belgium (Ultratip Bubbling Under Wallonia)	19
Canada Hot 100 (Billboard)	41
Canada Rock (Billboard)	1
Czech Republic Modern Rock (IFPI)	11
Germany (GfK)	83
Japan Hot 100 (Billboard)	17
Mexico Ingles Airplay (Billboard)	23
Netherlands (Mega Top 50)	12
Netherlands (Single Top 100)	31
Quebec Airplay (ADISQ)	46
Scottish Singles Sales (Official Charts)	22
UK Singles (Official Charts)	22
US Billboard Hot 100	68
US Hot Rock & Alternative Songs (Billboard)	1

Chart (2022)	Peak position
UK Rock & Metal (Official Charts)	36

=== Year-end charts ===
Chart (2011)	Position
US Hot Rock Songs (Billboard)	1

=== Decade-end charts ===
Chart (2010–2019)	Position
US Hot Rock Songs (Billboard)	16

== Certifications ==
Region	Certification	Certified units/sales
Australia (ARIA)	Gold	35,000^{‡}
Brazil (Pro-Música Brasil)	Gold	30,000^{‡}
New Zealand (RMNZ)	Gold	15,000^{‡}
United Kingdom (BPI)	Silver	200,000^{‡}
^{‡} Sales+streaming figures based on certification alone.
