= White Limo =

Single by Foo Fighters

from the album Wasting Light
- Released: March 28, 2011
- Genre: Hard rock; heavy metal; hardcore punk
- Length: 3:22
- Label: RCA
- Songwriters: Dave Grohl; Taylor Hawkins; Nate Mendel; Chris Shiflett; Pat Smear
- Producer: Butch Vig

Foo Fighters singles chronology
"Rope" (2011)	"White Limo" (2011)	"Walk" (2011)

Music video
- "White Limo" on YouTube

"White Limo" is a song by American rock band Foo Fighters. It is the second single from their seventh studio album Wasting Light. The single was released on March 28, 2011, as an iTunes digital download.

== Composition ==
In an interview with Classic Rock, Dave Grohl stated that the lyrics for "White Limo" were written in just two minutes. MTV writer Chris Ryan noted that the song showed Dave Grohl going back to his roots in hardcore punk, describing it as "...a blistering, paint-stripping thrash track that mixes mosh-inducing hard-core with the Foo’s penchant for melody." Revolver described the song as "the most metal track on "Wasting Light", and one of the most metal Foo Fighters songs ever." The song has also been categorized as simply hard rock.

== Release ==
On February 12, 2011, a music video was released for "White Limo", featuring Lemmy of Motörhead. It was the first full song released from Wasting Light, however, it was the second official single, released on March 28, 2011. It was preceded by "Rope" earlier that month.

English musician Liam Howlett, best known as a member of the Prodigy, remixed the song upon Dave Grohl's request and released it on October 16, 2011.

== Reception ==
"White Limo" was chosen as the winner of the Grammy Award for Best Hard Rock/Metal Performance in 2012.

== Personnel ==
Foo Fighters

- Dave Grohl – vocals, rhythm guitar
- Taylor Hawkins – drums
- Nate Mendel – bass guitar
- Chris Shiflett – lead guitar
- Pat Smear – guitar, baritone guitar

Production

- Butch Vig – production
- Foo Fighters – production
- James Brown – engineer
- Alan Moulder – mixing
- Joe LaPorta – mastering
- Emily Lazar – mastering

== Merchandise ==
The Foo Fighters have made available from their official merchandise website a die-cast White Limo Figurine.

== Charts ==
Chart (2011)	Peak position
UK Rock & Metal (Official Charts)	28

== Awards ==
Year	Award	Results
2012	Grammy Award for Best Hard Rock/Metal Performance	Won
