= Wasting Light =

Studio album by Foo Fighters
- Released: April 12, 2011
- Recorded: September 6 – December 21, 2010
- Studio: Dave Grohl's residence (Encino, Los Angeles)
- Genres: Alternative rock; post-grunge; hard rock
- Length: 47:55
- Labels: Roswell; RCA
- Producers: Butch Vig; Foo Fighters

Foo Fighters chronology
Greatest Hits (2009)	Wasting Light (2011)	Medium Rare (2011)

Singles from Wasting Light
- 1. "Rope" Released: March 1, 2011; 2. "White Limo" Released: March 28, 2011; 3. "Walk" Released: June 17, 2011; 4. "Arlandria" Released: September 18, 2011; 5. "These Days" Released: November 1, 2011; 6. "Bridge Burning" Released: June 5, 2012

Wasting Light is the seventh studio album by American rock band Foo Fighters, released on April 12, 2011, through Roswell and RCA Records.

Wanting to capture the essence of their earlier work and avoid the perceived artificiality of digital recording, Foo Fighters recorded the album in the garage of frontman Dave Grohl’s home in Encino, California, using only analog equipment. The sessions were produced by the band alongside Butch Vig, with whom Grohl had worked on Nirvana's Nevermind. Since the old equipment did not allow for many mistakes to be corrected in post-production, the band spent three weeks rehearsing the songs, and Vig had to relearn outdated editing techniques. The band sought a heavier and rawer sound in contrast to the experimentation of their previous albums. Most of the lyrics were written as Grohl reflected upon his life and possible future.

Guest musicians include Bob Mould, Krist Novoselic, Jessy Greene, Rami Jaffee and Fee Waybill. Pat Smear played as an official member of the band for the first time since The Colour and the Shape (1997), and the first album which recorded as five-piece band.

The recording sessions were documented on the band's website and Twitter. Promotion included the documentary Back and Forth and a worldwide concert tour that included performances in fans' garages. Wasting Light was preceded by the successful single "Rope", which became only the second song ever to debut at number one on Billboard's Rock Songs chart. The follow-up single, "Walk", also charted highly. Wasting Light debuted at number one in eleven countries, including the United States, and received positive reviews from most music critics, who praised the production and songwriting. In 2012, Wasting Light earned four Grammy Awards, including Best Rock Album.

== Background ==
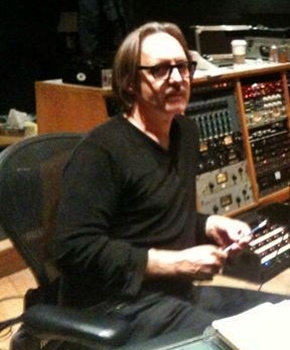
Butch Vig produced Wasting Light with the band.

After the Echoes, Silence, Patience & Grace tour ended in 2008, Foo Fighters went to Grandmaster Recorders in Hollywood to record a new album, but abandoned recording to take a break. They later rerecorded two of the songs, "Wheels" and "Word Forward", for their 2009 Greatest Hits album. The recording reunited frontman Dave Grohl with musician and producer Butch Vig, who had worked with Grohl's band Nirvana on their breakthrough album Nevermind (1991).

Grohl wanted to create an album that would "define" Foo Fighters, as he felt Back in Black defined AC/DC or the Black Album defined Metallica: "It might not be their best album, but it's the one people identify the band with the most ... You take all of the things that people consider your band's signature characteristics and just amplify them and make one simple album with that." He hired Vig for the project as he felt Vig was skilled at "trimming all the fat and making sense of it all".

On tour in 2010, with Them Crooked Vultures, Grohl developed songs and recorded demos, which he took to Foo Fighters drummer Taylor Hawkins for development. The band also saw the return of guitarist Pat Smear as a permanent member; Smear had left Foo Fighters after the release of The Colour and the Shape (1997), but had been part of the touring band since 2006.

"I get to [Dave Grohl's] house and the first thing he says is, 'I really wanna do this in my garage.' So we went downstairs and set up a snare drum. I said, 'Well, it sounds really loud and trashy, but I don't see why we can't do it.' Then he said he wanted to record on tape with no computers. That threw me for a loop; I've made lots of records that way, just not for the last 10 years. But Dave really wanted it to be about the sound and the performance. They'd just played some shows at Wembley Stadium, and he told me, 'We've gotten so huge, what's left to do? We could go back to 606 and make a big, slick, super-tight record just like the last one. Or we could try to capture the essence of the first couple of Foo Fighters records.'"

— Butch Vig on how the album came to be

Instead of recording the album in a modern studio, Grohl decided to record in his garage in Encino, Los Angeles. Grohl said: "There's poetry in being the band that can sell out Wembley but also makes a record in a garage. Why go into the most expensive studio with the biggest producer and use the best state-of-the-art equipment? Where's the rock'n'roll in that?" Grohl felt it was a way to make an innovative "primal sounding" record, subvert expectations, and "make records the way we used to fucking make records". Wasting Light was recorded using entirely analog equipment until post-mastering. Grohl said he felt digital recording was getting out of control: "When I listen to music these days, and I hear Pro Tools and drums that sound like a machine it kinda sucks the life out of music." According to Grohl, the analog strategy would make the record "sound rawer and somewhat imperfect; Chris Shiflett agreed that "rock n'roll is about flaws and imperfections". Hawkins wanted to avoid the "artificial sound" of contemporary recording and believed an analog project would help the band reclaim artistic freedom.

Vig initially thought the idea was a joke. He warned the band that they would have to play well, as mistakes were not easily corrected without digital technology. The band spent three weeks in pre-production and rehearsals at their usual studio, Studio 606, where the composition was completed, going "from forty songs to fourteen." They rehearsed the songs with the intent of recording them live in Grohl's garage, unlike their previous approach of coming up with parts during the recording process. The band committed to not changing what they recorded; according to Smear, "Whatever we did, we didn’t change it. If a distorted vocal went through a pedal, that’s what it was going to be."

== Recording ==
Whiteboard showing the progress in recording the songs of Wasting Light

Grohl's garage was equipped with microphones, sound baffles on the garage door and behind the drums to prevent sound leakings, and a carpet under the drum kit to make it sound less "loud and bright". To reduce the cymbal bleed, the microphones were rearranged and the crash cymbal was traded for a "shorter-decay Zildjian cymbal with holes drilled in it." A room next to the study was turned into an isolation booth to record the vocals. For the recording itself a makeshift control room was built inside a tent on the backyard, and a system of two cameras and a television provided the communication between the garage and the control room. The equipment was the same the band employed to record the albums There Is Nothing Left to Lose and One by One at Grohl's former house in Alexandria, Virginia.

Recording of the album began September 6, 2010, lasting for eleven weeks, each one focusing on a particular song, something Vig stated "was good because each song kinda had its own life". The recordings started with Grohl's rhythm guitar and Taylor Hawkins' drumming to provide the foundations and see if both could "lock in". Hawkins usually played for hours before he got "a drum track I'd be proud of". Click tracks were used, but Vig said that there was not a worry for the drums to follow it exactly as they "wanted it to groove" and "we realized that when everything is off just a few milliseconds, the sound gets wider and thicker." After the guitar and drum track, Mendel would play his basslines, which were practiced enough for them to be recorded perfectly on the first take. The following day, Shiflett and Smear would play guitars, with the latter being the last and usually being given a baritone guitar to have a different sound from the other guitarists. After the instrumental backing was ready, Grohl did the vocals either on the control room or the isolation booth. As Grohl wanted the songs "to have maximum emotional potential", the vocals were screamed to the point he had headaches—"when the mic is picking up every tiny inconsistency, you really strain to make it sound right."

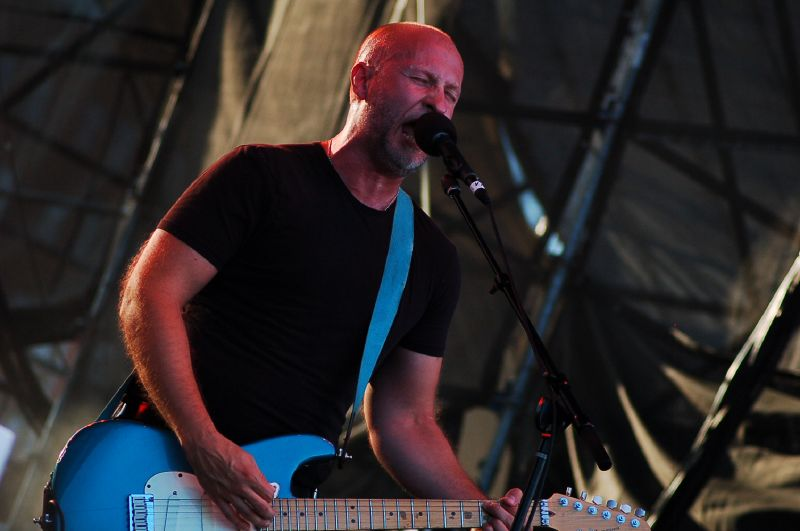
Bob Mould sang and played guitar on "Dear Rosemary".

Bob Mould of Hüsker Dü, one of Grohl's idols, was brought in to do vocals in a song Grohl conceived as a duet with him, "Dear Rosemary". Mould also played guitar on the track, even though Vig's plans had him just singing. Grohl's and Smear's former Nirvana bandmate Krist Novoselic appeared in "I Should Have Known" as Grohl thought "it would be nice to have him come down and share the experience" and that the song would be enhanced by his bass and accordion-playing." "Miss the Misery" features Fee Waybill of The Tubes, a personal friend of Grohl who said that the frontman invited him because "the background vocal sounded like him". Other guest musicians included three members of the expanded touring band, keyboardist Rami Jaffee, violinist Jessy Greene and percussionist Drew Hester.

Vig started doubting it could be done fully analog once the tapes for the first song recorded, "Miss the Misery", started falling apart, but Grohl reassured him "no, Butch, I don't want any computer in this house at all." The producer said that during recording he "had to force my brain to fire different synapses" to remember how to deal with the analog equipment and the lack of a digital display. One of the habits Vig had to call back was editing using a razor blade—"I used to be able to do 20 edits in half an hour if need be. It took me about 20 minutes to do the first edit!"—a technique he employed for the first songs recorded. Eventually he gave up and decided to punch in and punch out tapes instead, as the process was time-consuming and a more editable tape sent to Vig from Smart Studios was mostly ruined by one of Grohl's daughters. While many recordings had inserts and some parts rerecorded, the only song that had to be redone from scratch was "I Should Have Known", as Grohl felt Vig was "trying to make this into a radio single" when the singer wanted it "to sound really raw and primal".

The mixing started at Chalice Recording Studios, but moved to Grohl's house as engineer Alan Moulder said it was the way "to make it sound like your garage." Since Grohl's mixing console was not automated, at times four people—Vig, Grohl, Moulder and engineer James Brown—had to work simultaneously on the board, something Grohl found interesting because every song was done differently and "even the mixes sounded like performances" The mixes were tested out in the cars of the band members and Vig, as they felt that "if it sounds good on a lousy stereo, it will sound good anywhere".

The recording of the album was filmed as part of a career-spanning documentary called Back and Forth, which Grohl said was essential to make audiences understand the decision to record the album in his garage. The album name, taken from a lyric in "Miss the Misery", was chosen by Grohl because "it seemed to resonate with me: 'OK, that's what we're here doing'", as the band always "recorded each album thinking it could be our last" and tried to take the most of their tenure together—"we're only here for a short time, we're lucky to be alive, lucky to be a band; I don't take any of this for granted; I don't want to spend my time looking backwards, I want to look forwards".

== Composition ==
"Rope"
Sample of the album's lead single "Rope", showcasing the album's hard rock sound based on dual lead guitars.

For Wasting Light, Grohl stated that they would go back to a more raw and heavier sound after "exploring new musical ground" on the previous records, adding that "with the last album we were too concerned with being musical, now it's time for us to be a rock band again". To contrast with the "seven or eight minute-long songs, with seven or eight sections, and two or three time changes" Grohl played with Them Crooked Vultures, he instead tried to compose the "tightest, catchiest four-and-a-half-minute 'softball bat to your face' songs". Hawkins added that he liked Wasting Light for being "straightforward, and that’s a good thing for us right now. The last couple [records] had some big dynamic changes." Grohl described the effort as their heaviest yet, later saying it was done because "I'm 42 now. I don't know if I'm going to be able to make this record when I'm 46 or 49. It's my last chance." While the demos that prompted Grohl to say the album would be their heaviest yet were not used on the album, Vig took the declarations to heart, following three criteria while recording: "It's got to be hooky, heavy, and we're going analog all the way." Critics described the album's overall sound as alternative rock, post-grunge and hard rock.

For the guitar sound, the group tried to balance Grohl's "playing the rhythm straight up the middle", Shiflett's "sharp and clean sense of melodic playing", and Smear's more aggressive sound, with Grohl declaring that "with three guitars, you have to be careful that it doesn't become a huge fucking mess. But when everybody's playing their thing really well, it sounds perfectly orchestrated." Smear would usually play his parts on a baritone guitar, which would both contrast with Grohl and Shiflett and add a heavier sound – as Grohl declared, "if we ever felt like a section wasn't heavy enough, we put the fuckin' baritone on it, and it became huge." Hawkins added many buzz rolls to his drum fills at the suggestion of Vig, as buzz rolls were a trademark of one of the producer's favorite drummers, Ian Paice.

"I was writing about time. And how much has passed and feeling born again, feeling like a survivor, thinking about mortality and death and life, and how beautiful it is to be surrounded by friends and family and making music."

— Dave Grohl on the song lyrics

The lyrics for Wasting Light were completed during the week each song was being recorded. Grohl said that the words were "what was on my mind each week", most being "written from the perspective of who I was then and who I am now", with references to the past, life and death, and "time, but questioning whether it matters at all. There's so much focus on the before that people forget there's an after." The frontman said this was helped by the environment – "a lot of retrospection and introspection and nostalgia going back to the way we used to make records" - and working with Vig again, which "made me think a lot about starting over, and rebirth, and making your way through tragedy and coming out the other side." An example was "I Should Have Known", partially inspired by former Nirvana bandmate Kurt Cobain – "a song like 'I Should Have Known' is about all the people I've lost, not just Kurt". Grohl still tried to do simpler songs such as "White Limo", which had its lyrics written in just two minutes, specially after Mendel sent him an e-mail saying, "I really like it when you write songs that are silly and mean nothing, too. You don't have to try to write 'Imagine' every time you sit down with a pen and paper".

== Packaging and formats ==
The first CD copies of the album contain a small section of the original analog master tape. Grohl decided on the promotion both because he thought it "would be an extraordinary move to destroy all the masters and give the pieces of the tapes to the fans", as the digital recording does not allow for such a memento, and also because every technician involved with Wasting Light was overly worried about the tapes. The art direction was done by New York studio Morning Breath Inc., and keeping with the album's analog recording, the images did not use computer graphics, instead being created with "old tools of the trade" such as copy machines, transparent ink and X-Acto blades; the result was not printed in CMYK.

The album was issued on CD, a double vinyl record and digital download. The pre-orders had the option for both the CD and LP with a T-shirt, and a Deluxe packaging that came with both the CD and LP, a T-shirt, a beer coaster, an iron-on patch, a wristband and a signed lithograph of the album cover. iTunes in turn issued a deluxe edition that included a remix of "Rope" made by Deadmau5, the outtake "Better Off", the video for "White Limo" and a live performance of "Walk".

== Release and promotion ==
Extensive updates on the production of Wasting Light were up on the band's website and Twitter, because, as put by RCA Records executive Aaron Borns, "the band wanted to be more engaged with the fans earlier this time." Along with images of the sessions themselves and both a whiteboard and papers that showed the progress in recording, a live feed of the tape machine would be put on the Foo Fighters website.

On December 21, 2010, the same day the album was finished, the band played a secret gig at the Tarzana, California bar Paladino's, on which four songs from the new record made their live debuts. The Wasting Light World Tour started in 2011, with some concerts having the album played in its entirety along with other hit songs by the band. Given the album was recorded in a garage, the band held a contest for which some shows of the promotional tour would be performed in eight fans' garages.

On January 17, 2011, the band released a 30-second teaser of the song "Bridge Burning" on their website, and on February 1, the band revealed a teaser for "Miss the Misery" along with the album name and an April 12 release date. On February 12, a music video was released for "White Limo", featuring Lemmy of Motörhead. On February 23, 2011, "Rope" was made available for online stream. It debuted at #1 on Billboard's Rock Chart, making it only the second single to do so since the chart's advent in 2009, and would later top the Alternative Songs chart as well. Another part of the promotional campaign was a contest held by Fuse TV where fans created their own videos for the Wasting Light tracks.

After "Rope", four other songs were issued as singles: "Walk", "Arlandria", "These Days", and "Bridge Burning". The most successful was "Walk", which also topped the Rock and Alternative charts. Five songs on the album were licensed for ESPN and two others were featured in movies, "Miss the Misery" in Real Steel and "Walk" in Thor. In addition, "Bridge Burning" appears in the video game Madden NFL 12. "Walk" was also featured in a video package that was put together by the WWE to be included for Edge's induction into the 2012 WWE Hall of Fame and it was played again after he said he wanted real rock n' roll to close out the ceremony.

== Critical reception ==
Professional ratings
Aggregate scores
Source	Rating
AnyDecentMusic?	6.9/10
Metacritic	78/100
Review scores
Source	Rating
AllMusic	4.5/5 stars
The A.V. Club	B
The Daily Telegraph	4/5 stars
Entertainment Weekly	A−
The Guardian	3/5 stars
NME	8/10
Pitchfork	6.4/10
Q	4/5 stars
Rolling Stone	4/5 stars
Spin	9/10

Wasting Light received generally positive reviews from music critics. At Metacritic, which assigns a normalized rating out of 100 to reviews from mainstream critics, the album received an average score of 78, based on 37 reviews. Andrew Perry of The Daily Telegraph viewed it as by far the band's best album and found it "tough but accessible, reliably catchy, yet also surprising at the last." AllMusic editor Stephen Thomas Erlewine called its rock sound "untrammeled" and cited it as "the fiercest album they've ever made ... the kind of record they've always seemed on the verge of delivering but never have." Mikael Wood of Spin observed a "back-to-basics aspiration" and dubbed the album "Grohl's most memorable set of songs since 1997's The Colour and the Shape." Rob Parker of NME said that it "sounds phenomenal" on headphones or sound systems and is "both broad and focused enough to appeal to casuals and longhairs alike". Paul Brannigan of Q praised Grohl's lyrics and called Wasting Light "the most life-affirming, positively-charged album of his career." David Fricke, writing for Rolling Stone, commended Grohl's themes and Butch Vig's "nuanced approach to weight and release." Kyle Ryan of The A.V. Club said that, although it lacks recognizable hooks, the album also lacks the filler of the band's previous albums and stated, "As a return to Foo Fighters' specialty—melodic, hard-hitting rock with soaring choruses—Wasting Light is a success."

In a mixed review, Slant Magazine's Kevin Liedel criticized the band's "growing aversion to anthemic songs," writing that "the obvious high points of Wasting Light are those that strive for stadium-pleasing melodies." Dave Simpson of The Guardian noted an "undue" arena influence and called the album "a typically supersized arena-rock barrage, with lots of howling and wailing, every chorus tailored to imaginary walls of pyrotechnics and some tracks seemingly specifically constructed to accommodate a guitar spot or drum solo." Greg Kot of the Chicago Tribune felt that, although it is "competently" performed, the songs are not innovative and suffer from "clichés", including "hardcore punk screed", "streamlined rocker", and "melodramatic power ballad". Pitchfork's David Bevan commented that "there just isn't a melody or hook to really amplify." Andy Gill of The Independent criticized its "bombastic level" and stated "the presumed desire for back-to-the-roots simplicity ... jettisons the diversity of Echoes, Silence, Patience & Grace."

=== Accolades ===
Wasting Light and its songs were nominated for five Grammy Awards, including Album of the Year. The record won the Best Rock Album award, while "White Limo" was chosen as the Best Hard Rock/Metal Performance and "Walk" won both Best Rock Performance and Best Rock Song. The album was chosen as the 4th best album of 2011 by Kerrang!, and listed in three rankings of the 50 best albums of the year: 20th by Rolling Stone, 43rd by NME, and 46th by Spin. It was also listed among The Hollywood Reporter's ten best albums of 2011, and chosen as the album of the year by iTunes. In 2024, Loudwire staff elected it as the best hard rock album of 2011.

== Commercial performance ==
The album debuted at number one in twelve countries. Wasting Light was the first Foo Fighters album to top the United States' Billboard 200 chart, with first-week sales of 235,000 copies, their second-highest sales week, following In Your Honor's first-week sales of 311,000 copies in 2005. In Canada, the album debuted at number one on the Canadian Albums Chart, selling 21,000 copies in its first week. In the UK, the album's 114,000 units broke Adele's 11-week run atop the UK Album Charts.

On the week of Wasting Light's release, 6 different tracks from the album made the UK Top 40 Rock Chart. These were the iTunes bonus track "Better Off" at number 5, "Bridge Burning" at number 14, "Walk" at number 24, "White Limo" at number 28, "Arlandria" at number 35 and "These Days" at number 39. In both Australia and New Zealand Wasting Light had the biggest first week digital album sales in their chart histories. The album also topped the charts in Germany, Austria, Switzerland, Sweden, Finland, Norway, New Zealand, and Singapore. Wasting Light has sold 663,000 copies in the US as of January 6, 2012, and closed 2011 with 380,000 units sold in the UK.

== Track listing ==
All tracks are written by Foo Fighters (Dave Grohl, Taylor Hawkins, Nate Mendel, Chris Shiflett, and Pat Smear).

No.	Title	Length
1.	"Bridge Burning"	4:46
2.	"Rope"	4:19
3.	"Dear Rosemary"	4:26
4.	"White Limo"	3:22
5.	"Arlandria"	4:28
6.	"These Days"	4:58
7.	"Back & Forth"	3:52
8.	"A Matter of Time"	4:36
9.	"Miss the Misery"	4:33
10.	"I Should Have Known"	4:15
11.	"Walk"	4:16
Total length:		47:55

Japanese edition bonus track
No.	Title	Length
12.	"Better Off"	4:12
Total length:		52:07

iTunes and Best Buy Deluxe edition
No.	Title	Length
12.	"Rope" (Deadmau5 Remix)	5:52
13.	"Better Off"	4:12
14.	"White Limo" (Video)	3:35
15.	"Walk" (Live at the Roxy) (Video)	4:23
Total length:		65:57

== Personnel ==
Credits adapted from Wasting Light liner notes, except where noted.

Foo Fighters

- Dave Grohl – vocals, rhythm guitar
- Taylor Hawkins – drums, vocals
- Nate Mendel – bass guitar
- Chris Shiflett – lead guitar
- Pat Smear – guitar, baritone guitar

Additional musicians

- Bob Mould – vocals and guitar on "Dear Rosemary"
- Krist Novoselic – bass guitar and accordion on "I Should Have Known"
- Rami Jaffee – keyboards on "Bridge Burning" and "Rope"; Mellotron on "I Should Have Known"; organ on "Walk" and "Dear Rosemary"
- Jessy Greene – violin on "I Should Have Known"
- Fee Waybill – backing vocals on "Miss the Misery"
- Butch Vig − percussion on "Back & Forth"
- Drew Hester − percussion on "Arlandria"

Production

- Butch Vig – production
- Foo Fighters – production
- James Brown – engineer
- Alan Moulder – mixing
- Joe LaPorta – mastering
- Emily Lazar – mastering

Artwork

- Morning Breath Inc. – art direction and design
- Steve Gullick – photography

== Charts ==
=== Weekly charts ===
2011 weekly chart performance
Chart (2011)	Peak position
Australian Albums (ARIA)	1
Austrian Albums (Ö3 Austria)	1
Belgian Albums (Ultratop Flanders)	1
Belgian Albums (Ultratop Wallonia)	4
Canadian Albums (Billboard)	1
Croatian International Albums (HDU)	1
Czech Albums (IFPI)	4
Danish Albums (Hitlisten)	3
Dutch Albums (Album Top 100)	2
Finnish Albums (Suomen virallinen lista)	1
French Albums (SNEP)	18
German Albums (Offizielle Top 100)	1
Greek Albums (IFPI)	6
Irish Albums (IRMA)	3
Italian Albums (FIMI)	4
Japanese Albums (Oricon)	9
Mexican Albums (Top 100 Mexico)	52
New Zealand Albums (RMNZ)	1
Norwegian Albums (VG-lista)	1
Polish Albums (ZPAV)	12
Portuguese Albums (AFP)	3
Scottish Albums (Official Charts)	1
South Korean Albums (Circle)	88
South Korean International Albums (Circle)	34
Spanish Albums (Promusicae)	7
Swedish Albums (Sverigetopplistan)	1
Swiss Albums (Romandie)	2
Swiss Albums (Schweizer Hitparade)	1
UK Albums (Official Charts)	1
UK Rock & Metal Albums (Official Charts)	1
US Billboard 200	1
US Top Alternative Albums (Billboard)	1
US Top Hard Rock Albums (Billboard)	1
US Top Rock Albums (Billboard)	1
US Indie Store Album Sales (Billboard)	1
US Vinyl Albums (Billboard)	2

=== Year-end charts ===
2011 year-end chart performance
Chart (2011)	Position
Australian Albums (ARIA)	8
Austrian Albums (Ö3 Austria)	26
Belgian Albums (Ultratop Flanders)	9
Belgian Alternative Albums (Ultratop Flanders)	6
Belgian Albums (Ultratop Wallonia)	68
Canadian Albums (Billboard)	35
Danish Albums (Hitlisten)	41
Dutch Albums (MegaCharts)	28
Finnish Albums (Suomen viralinen lista)	4
German Albums (Offizielle Top 100)	30
Italian Albums (FIMI)	86
New Zealand Albums (RMNZ)	6
Swedish Albums (Sverigetopplistan)	20
Swedish Albums & Compilations (Sverigetopplistan)	35
Swiss Albums (Schweizer Hitparade)	26
UK Albums (OCC)	24
US Billboard 200	39
US Alternative Albums (Billboard)	3
US Hard Rock Albums (Billboard)	1
US Top Rock Albums (Billboard)	4
Worldwide Albums (IFPI)	17

2012 year-end chart performance
Chart (2012)	Position
Australian Albums (ARIA)	95
New Zealand Albums (RMNZ)	50
UK Albums (OCC)	182
US Alternative Albums (Billboard)	27
US Hard Rock Albums (Billboard)	10
US Top Rock Albums (Billboard)	49

=== Decade-end charts ===
2010s decade-end chart performance
Chart (2010–2019)	Position
Australian Albums (ARIA)	74
US Top Rock Albums (Billboard)	50

== Certifications ==
Certifications for Wasting Light
Region	Certification	Certified units/sales
Australia (ARIA)	2× Platinum	140,000^{^}
Austria (IFPI Austria)	Gold	10,000^{*}
Belgium (BRMA)	Gold	15,000^{*}
Brazil (Pro-Música Brasil)	Gold	20,000^{*}
Canada (Music Canada)	Platinum	80,000^{^}
Finland (Musiikkituottajat)	Gold	19,397
Germany (BVMI)	Platinum	200,000^{‡}
Ireland (IRMA)	Gold	7,500^{^}
Italy (FIMI)	Gold	30,000^{*}
Netherlands (NVPI)	Gold	25,000^{^}
New Zealand (RMNZ)	2× Platinum	30,000^{‡}
Poland (ZPAV)	Gold	10,000^{*}
Sweden (GLF)	Gold	20,000^{‡}
Switzerland (IFPI Switzerland)	Gold	15,000^{^}
United Kingdom (BPI)	Platinum	520,000
United States (RIAA)	Platinum	1,000,000^{‡}
^{*} Sales figures based on certification alone.^{^} Shipments figures based on certification alone.^{‡} Sales+streaming figures based on certification alone.
