= Take Cover Tour =

2026-27 concert tour by Foo Fighters

- World tour by Foo Fighters
- Promotional poster for the concerts in Germany. Each country has a distinctive poster.
- Location: Europe; North America; Oceania; South America
- Associated album: Your Favorite Toy
- Start date: January 10, 2026
- End date: September 18, 2027
- No. of shows: 57
- Supporting acts: Full Flower Moon Band; Spooky Eyes; Frankie and the Witch Fingers; Royel Otis; Otoboke Beaver; Inhaler; Die Spitz; Idles; Fat Dog; Queens of the Stone Age; Mannequin Pussy; Gouge Away; Mini Skirt; Downgirl; The Belair Lip Bombs; TEENS; The Buoys; C.O.F.F.I.N; FRENZEE; Kurralta Park; Dartz; Seek Help!; Dick Move; Ringlets; The Southern River Band; Last Quokka; The Pretty Reckless; Die Spitz; Alain Johannes; Pinkshift; Still in Therapy; Mali; Niña Lobo; Gamepad; Usted Señalemelo; Pacifica; Adelaida; Aurora Voraz; Cometa a la Deriva; Lucy Perez; Karen Dió; Deb and The Mentals; The Hives

Foo Fighters concert chronology
- Everything or Nothing at All Tour (2024); Take Cover Tour (2026–2027)

The Take Cover Tour is a concert tour by the American rock band Foo Fighters. The tour was announced on October 23, 2025, with only North America tour dates at first. More tour dates in Europe, Oceania and South America were announced later.

The tour started on January 10, 2026, in León, Mexico, and is set to conclude on March 3, 2027, in Lima, Peru.

This is the band's first tour with new drummer Ilan Rubin, following the departure of Josh Freese.

== Background ==
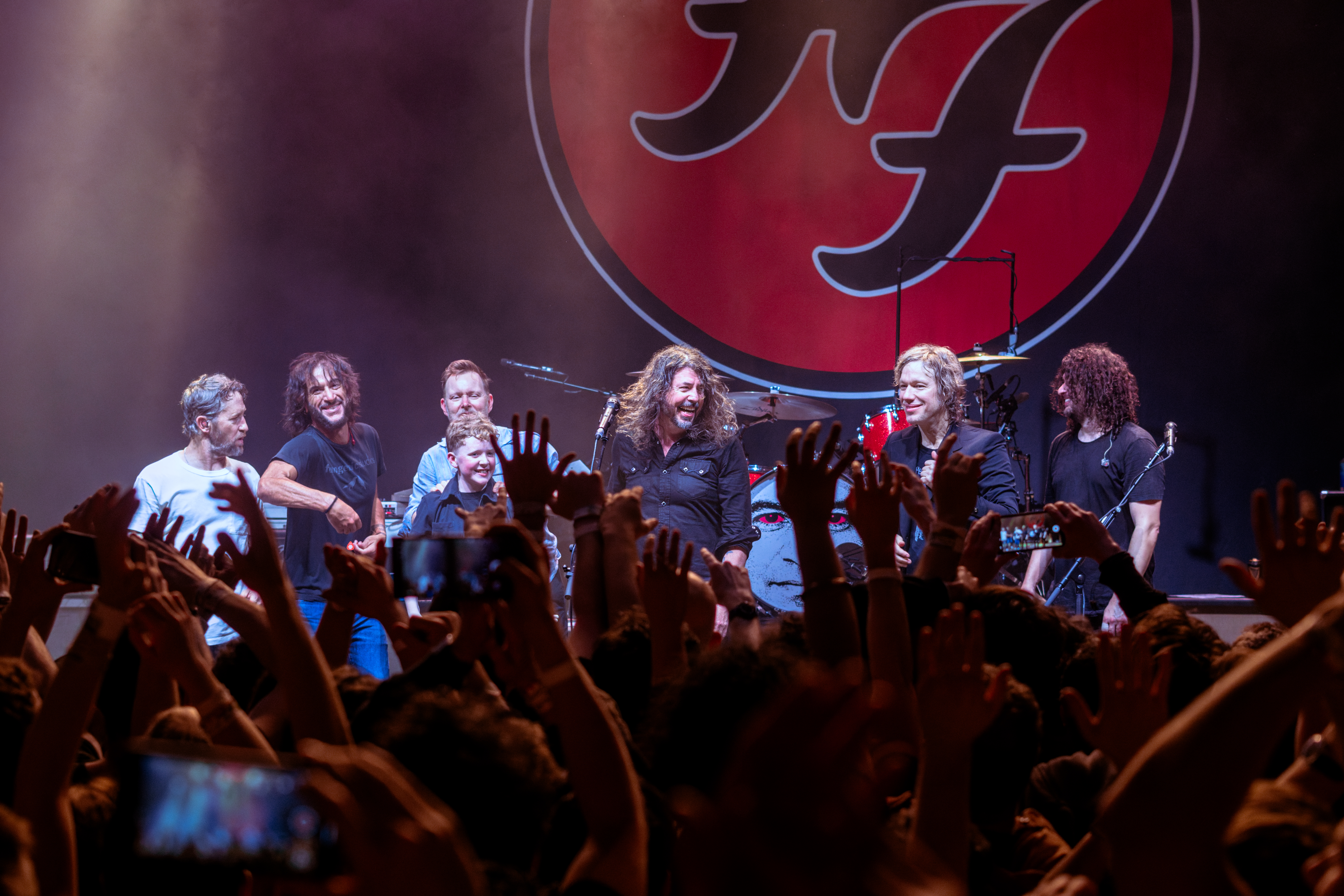
Foo Fighters after the performance with touring member Jason Falkner in London, 2026

The band teased that there is a major tour coming on September 16, 2025, stating "Stay tuned", and "There's more to come". The tour was officially announced one month later on October 23, 2025, with twelve stadium tour dates in United States and Canada spanning through August and September 2026. Three more festival shows in the United States were later announced, and are set to take place in May and September 2026. Another headlining arena show in Bridgeport, Connecticut was announced on March 16, 2026.

The European leg of the tour was announced on November 10, 2025, with nine stadium shows and three festival dates in June and July 2026. One more festival date at the Pinkpop Festival in the Netherlands was announced two weeks later on November 24, 2025.

The band performed a special benefit concert in Inglewood, United States at the Kia Forum on January 14, 2026. All proceeds from the show were donated to Hope The Mission and Los Angeles Mission organizations. On December 3, 2025, they announced another one-off show in Launceston, Australia at the UTAS Stadium, which took place on January 24, 2026.

In January 2026, it was announced that Pat Smear would be absent for the beginning of the tour after suffering an injury. Guitarist Jason Falkner would take his place.

On February 18, 2026, the band announced a full Australian and New Zealand tour with two legs, one in November 2026 and one in January 2027. The following day the band released new single "Your Favorite Toy" and announced the release of their new album with the same name as the single, which will come out on April 24, 2026. Later that week a series of three intimate shows across Ireland and England was announced, that took place later that month.

On February 26, 2026, it was announced, that the band will be headlining the Rock in Rio festival in Brazil on September 4, 2026. Later, on August 14, 2026, the band announced two solo stadium shows in the country, in the cities of Belo Horizonte and São Paulo.

On April 29, 2026, the band announced on social media two pop up shows in Manhattan, New York at Irving Plaza on April 30, and in Sayreville, New Jersey at Starland Ballroom on May 2, 2026. Tickets were only available from the venue box office.

== Set list ==
The following set list is taken from the concert held on April 28, 2026, in Bridgeport. It does not represent all concerts.

1. "All My Life"
2. "Caught in the Echo"
3. "Times Like These"
4. "The Pretender"
5. "Of All People"
6. "Stacked Actors"
7. "These Days"
8. "Walk"
9. "My Hero"
10. "Learn to Fly"
11. "Your Favorite Toy"
12. "This Is a Call"
13. "No Son of Mine"
14. "The Sky Is a Neighborhood"
15. "Shame Shame"
16. "White Limo"
17. "Spit Shine"
18. "Rescued"
19. "Under You"
20. "Aurora"
21. "Monkey Wrench"
22. "Hey, Johnny Park!"
23. "Big Me"
24. "Best of You"

Encore

25. "A320"
26. "Child Actor"
27. "Unconditional"
28. "Exhausted"
29. "Everlong"

== Tour dates ==
List of 2026 concerts
Date (2026)	City	Country	Venue	Opening act	Attendance	Revenue
January 10	León	Mexico	Velaria de la Feria	—N/a	—N/a	—N/a
January 14	Inglewood	United States	Kia Forum	—N/a	—	—
January 24	Launceston	Australia	UTAS Stadium	Full Flower Moon Band; Spooky Eyes	24,100 / 24,100	$3,000,000
February 23	Dublin	Ireland	The Academy	—N/a	—	—
February 25	London	England	Shepherd's Bush Empire	—N/a	—	—
February 27	Manchester	England	O_{2} Ritz	—N/a	—	—
April 28	Bridgeport	United States	Total Mortgage Arena	Frankie and the Witch Fingers	—	—
April 30	New York	United States	Irving Plaza	—N/a	—	—
May 2	Sayreville	United States	Starland Ballroom	—N/a	—	—
May 8 (Note: The performance on May 8, 2026, was a part of Welcome to Rockville.)	Daytona Beach	United States	Daytona International Speedway	—N/a	—N/a	—N/a
May 23 (Note: The performance on May 23, 2026, was a part of BottleRock.)	Napa	United States	Napa Valley Expo	—N/a	—N/a	—N/a
June 10	Oslo	Norway	Unity Arena	Royel Otis; Otoboke Beaver	—	—
June 12	Stockholm	Sweden	Nationalarenan	Royel Otis; Otoboke Beaver	—	—
June 15	Warsaw	Poland	Stadion Narodowy	Royel Otis; Otoboke Beaver	—	—
June 17	Munich	Germany	Allianz Arena	Inhaler; Otoboke Beaver	50,456 / 50,456	—
June 19	Paris	France	Paris La Défense Arena	Inhaler; Otoboke Beaver	39,644 / 39,644	—
June 21 (Note: The performance on June 21, 2026, was a part of Pinkpop.)	Landgraaf	Netherlands	Megaland	—N/a	—N/a	—N/a
June 25	Liverpool	England	Anfield	Inhaler; Otoboke Beaver	—	—
June 27	Liverpool	England	Anfield	Royel Otis; Die Spitz	—	—
July 1	Berlin	Germany	Olympiastadion	Idles; Fat Dog	61,955 / 61,955	—
July 3	Vienna	Austria	Ernst Happel Stadion	Idles; Fat Dog	—	—
July 5 (Note: The performance on July 5, 2026, was a part of I-Days Milano.)	Milan	Italy	Ippodromo La Maura	—N/a	—N/a	—N/a
July 8 (Note: The performance on July 8, 2026, was a part of Mad Cool.)	Madrid	Spain	Valdebebas	—N/a	—N/a	—N/a
July 10 (Note: The performance on July 10, 2026, was a part of NOS Alive.)	Lisbon	Portugal	Passeio Marítimo de Algés	—N/a	—N/a	—N/a
August 4	Toronto	Canada	Rogers Stadium	Queens of the Stone Age; Mannequin Pussy	288,837 / 288,837	$57,200,000
August 6	Detroit	United States	Ford Field	Queens of the Stone Age; Mannequin Pussy	288,837 / 288,837	$57,200,000
August 8	Chicago	United States	Soldier Field	Queens of the Stone Age; Mannequin Pussy	288,837 / 288,837	$57,200,000
August 10	Cleveland	United States	Huntington Bank Field	Queens of the Stone Age; Mannequin Pussy	288,837 / 288,837	$57,200,000
August 13	Philadelphia	United States	Lincoln Financial Field	Queens of the Stone Age; Mannequin Pussy	288,837 / 288,837	$57,200,000
August 15	Nashville	United States	Nissan Stadium	Queens of the Stone Age; Mannequin Pussy	288,837 / 288,837	$57,200,000
August 17	Washington, D.C.	United States	Nationals Park	Queens of the Stone Age; Mannequin Pussy	288,837 / 288,837	$57,200,000
September 4 (Note: The performance on September 4, 2026, was a part of Rock in Rio.)	Rio de Janeiro	Brazil	Barra Olympic Park	—N/a	—N/a	—N/a
September 12	Fargo	United States	Fargodome	Mannequin Pussy	—	—
September 15	Regina	Canada	Mosaic Stadium	Queens of the Stone Age; Mannequin Pussy	28,167 / 28,167	(Note: The revenue is representative of the 11 North American stadium shows from August 4 to September 26, 2026.)
September 17	Edmonton	Canada	Commonwealth Stadium	Queens of the Stone Age; Mannequin Pussy	41,038 / 41,038	(Note: The revenue is representative of the 11 North American stadium shows from August 4 to September 26, 2026.)
September 20	Vancouver	Canada	BC Place	Queens of the Stone Age; Gouge Away	39,334 / 39,334	(Note: The revenue is representative of the 11 North American stadium shows from August 4 to September 26, 2026.)
September 24 (Note: The performance on September 24, 2026, was a part of Bourbon & Beyond.)	Louisville	United States	Kentucky Exposition Center	—N/a	—N/a	—N/a
September 26	Paradise	United States	Allegiant Stadium	Queens of the Stone Age; Gouge Away	37,663 / 37,663	
November 5	Brisbane	Australia	Suncorp Stadium	Full Flower Moon Band; Mini Skirt	—	—
November 7	Townsville	Australia	Queensland Country Bank Stadium	Full Flower Moon Band; Downgirl	—	—
November 10	Sydney	Australia	Accor Stadium	The Belair Lip Bombs; TEENS	—	—
November 12	Newcastle	Australia	McDonald Jones Stadium	The Buoys; C.O.F.F.I.N	—	—
November 14	Melbourne	Australia	Marvel Stadium	The Belair Lip Bombs; FRENZEE	—	—
November 17	Adelaide	Australia	Coopers Stadium	Kurralta Park; Spooky Eyes	—	—

List of 2027 concerts
Date (2027)	City	Country	Venue	Opening act	Attendance	Revenue
January 19	Christchurch	New Zealand	One New Zealand Stadium	Dartz; Seek Help!	—	—
January 22	Auckland	New Zealand	Western Springs Stadium	Dick Move; Ringlets	—	—
January 25	Perth	Australia	HBF Park	The Southern River Band; Last Quokka	—	—
January 29	Bengaluru	India	Bengaluru LIVE	The Pretty Reckless; Die Spitz; Alain Johannes; Pinkshift	—	—
January 31	Mumbai	India	Mahalaxmi Racecourse	The Pretty Reckless; Die Spitz; Still in Therapy; Mali	—	—
February 18	Belo Horizonte	Brazil	Arena MRV	Karen Dió; Deb and The Mentals	—	—
February 20	São Paulo	Brazil	Estádio MorumBIS	Karen Dió; Deb and The Mentals	—	—
February 23	Montevideo	Uruguay	Estadio Centenario	Niña Lobo; Gamepad	—	—
February 25	Buenos Aires	Argentina	Estadio River Plate	Usted Señalemelo; Pacifica	—	—
February 28	Santiago	Chile	Parque Deportivo Estadio Nacional	Adelaida; Aurora Voraz	—	—
March 3	Lima	Peru	Estadio Universidad San Marcos	Cometa a la Deriva; Lucy Perez	—	—
June 9	Reykjavik	Iceland	Laugardalshöll	The Hives	—	—
June 12	Helsinki	Finland	Olympic Stadium	The Hives	—	—
June 15	Copenhagen	Denmark	Valbyparken	The Hives	—	—
June 17	Düsseldorf	Germany	Merkur Spiel-Arena	The Hives	—	—
June 30	Sofia	Bulgaria	Vasil Levski Stadium	Slowdive Florence Road		
July 2	Athens	Greece	Ejekt Festival	Architects; Frenzee	—	—
September 9	London	England	Wembley Stadium	Garbage; Reclus.e	—	—
September 11	London	England	Wembley Stadium	St Vincent; Florence Road	—	—
September 14	Darlington	England	Darlington Arena	St Vincent; Yard Act		
September 16	Edinburgh	Scotland	Murrayfield Stadium	Garbage; The Vaselines		
September 18	Dublin	Ireland	Croke Park	Garbage; Florence Road		
Total					611,194	$60,200,000

== Personnel ==
Foo Fighters

- Dave Grohl – lead vocals, guitar, acoustic guitar, drums
- Pat Smear – guitar
- Chris Shiflett – guitar, backing vocals
- Nate Mendel – bass guitar, backing vocals
- Rami Jaffee – keyboards, theremin
- Ilan Rubin – drums, backing vocals, guitar

Touring musicians

- Jason Falkner – guitar (substitute for Pat Smear on early shows)
