= Everything or Nothing at All Tour =

Concert tour by Foo Fighters

- Tour by Foo Fighters
- promotional poster
- Location: Europe; North America
- Associated album: But Here We Are
- Start date: May 1, 2024
- End date: August 18, 2024
- No. of shows: 30
- Box office: $104 million

Foo Fighters concert chronology
- Concrete and Gold Tour (2017–2018); Everything Or Nothing at All Tour (2024); Take Cover Tour (2026–2027)

Everything or Nothing at All Tour was a concert tour by the American rock band Foo Fighters, in support of But Here We Are, their eleventh studio album. It began on May 1, 2024, in Dallas, TX.

== Background ==
In June 2023, Foo Fighters announced that they would be embarking on a five-city stadium tour in the United Kingdom the following June, with an extra date in Manchester later added to the tour.

In October 2023, the tour was extended, with a 10-city North American leg in summer 2024. In November 2023, the band was announced as a headliner for the 2024 edition of the Welcome to Rockville festival in Daytona Beach, Florida. That same month, it was announced that the band was to headline the Shaky Knees Festival on May 5, 2024, in Atlanta. In December 2023, they added five more dates in May at the start of the tour, which now began on May 1 in Dallas. This first leg was extended with a headline set at New Orleans Jazz Fest on May 3, 2024, announced in January 2024.

== Set list ==
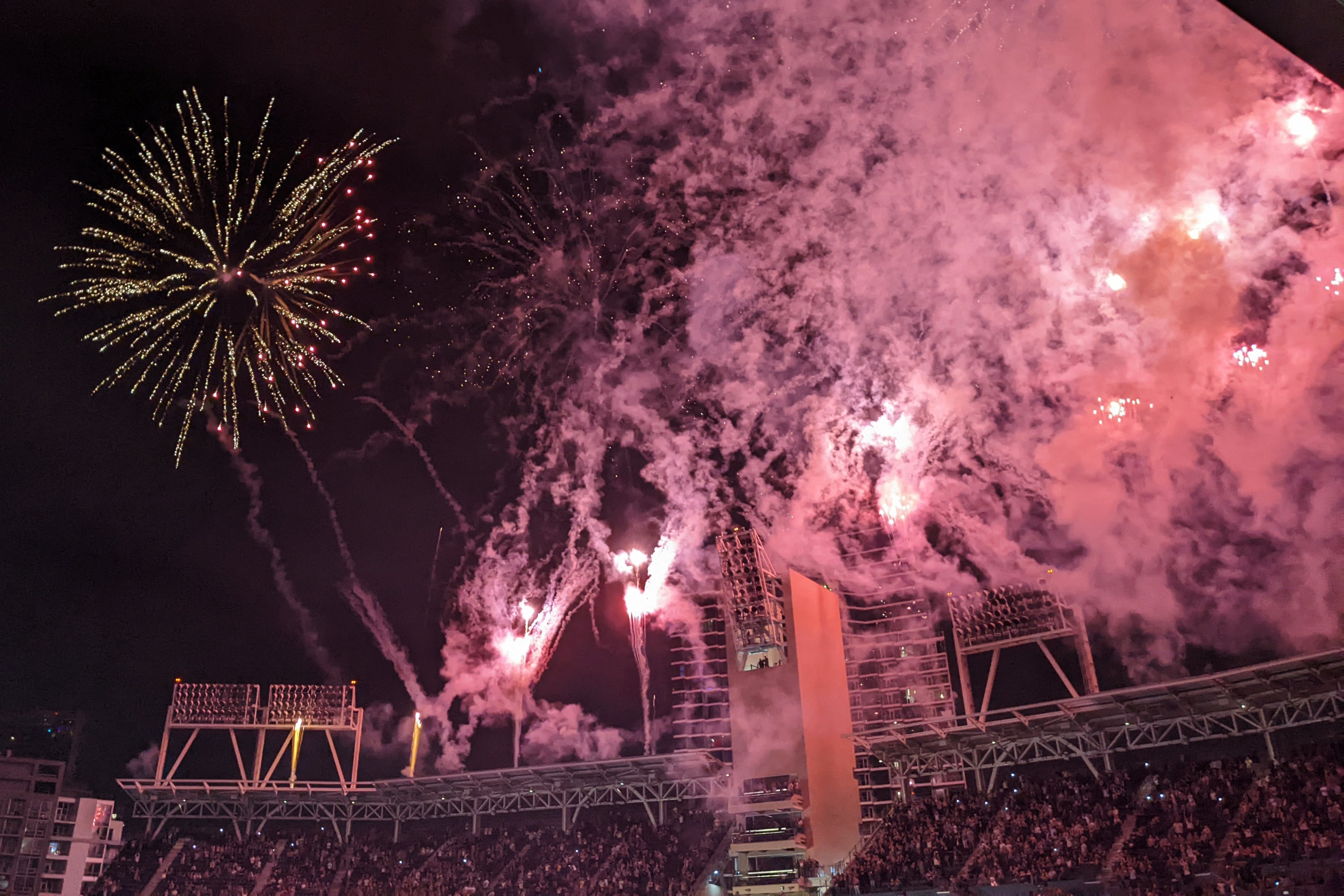
Fireworks display during the performance of "Everlong" in San Diego

This set list is taken from the band's show on June 25, 2024, at Cardiff's Principality Stadium. Most of the tour's shows followed a similar set list, with minor changes at each show.

1. "All My Life"
2. "No Son of Mine"
3. "Rescued"
4. "The Pretender"
5. "Walk"
6. "Times Like These"
7. "Generator"
8. "La Dee Da"
9. "Breakout"
10. "Guitar Solo / Sabotage / Keyboard Solo / Blitzkrieg Bop / Whip It / March of the Pigs"
11. "My Hero"
12. "The Sky Is a Neighborhood"
13. "Learn to Fly"
14. "Arlandria"
15. "These Days"
16. "Skin and Bones" (acoustic)
17. "Big Me" (acoustic)
18. "Under You" (acoustic)
19. "Nothing at All"
20. "Monkey Wrench"
21. "Aurora"
22. "Best of You"

Encore

1. "The Teacher"
2. "This Is a Call"
3. "Everlong"

=== Special guests ===
- On June 17 in Glasgow, the band were joined by Violet Grohl, daughter of Dave Grohl, to perform "Show Me How" for the first time on the tour. Violet Grohl appeared again to perform the song on June 20 and 22 in London.
- On June 20 in London, the band were joined by Shane Hawkins, son of Taylor Hawkins, during the encore, to perform drums on "This Is A Call". Hawkins appeared again to perform the song on June 25 in Cardiff and June 27 in Birmingham.
- On June 27 in Birmingham, Geezer Butler joined the band to perform Black Sabbath's "Paranoid".

Michael Bublé joined them to sing Haven’t Met You Yet

=== Notes ===
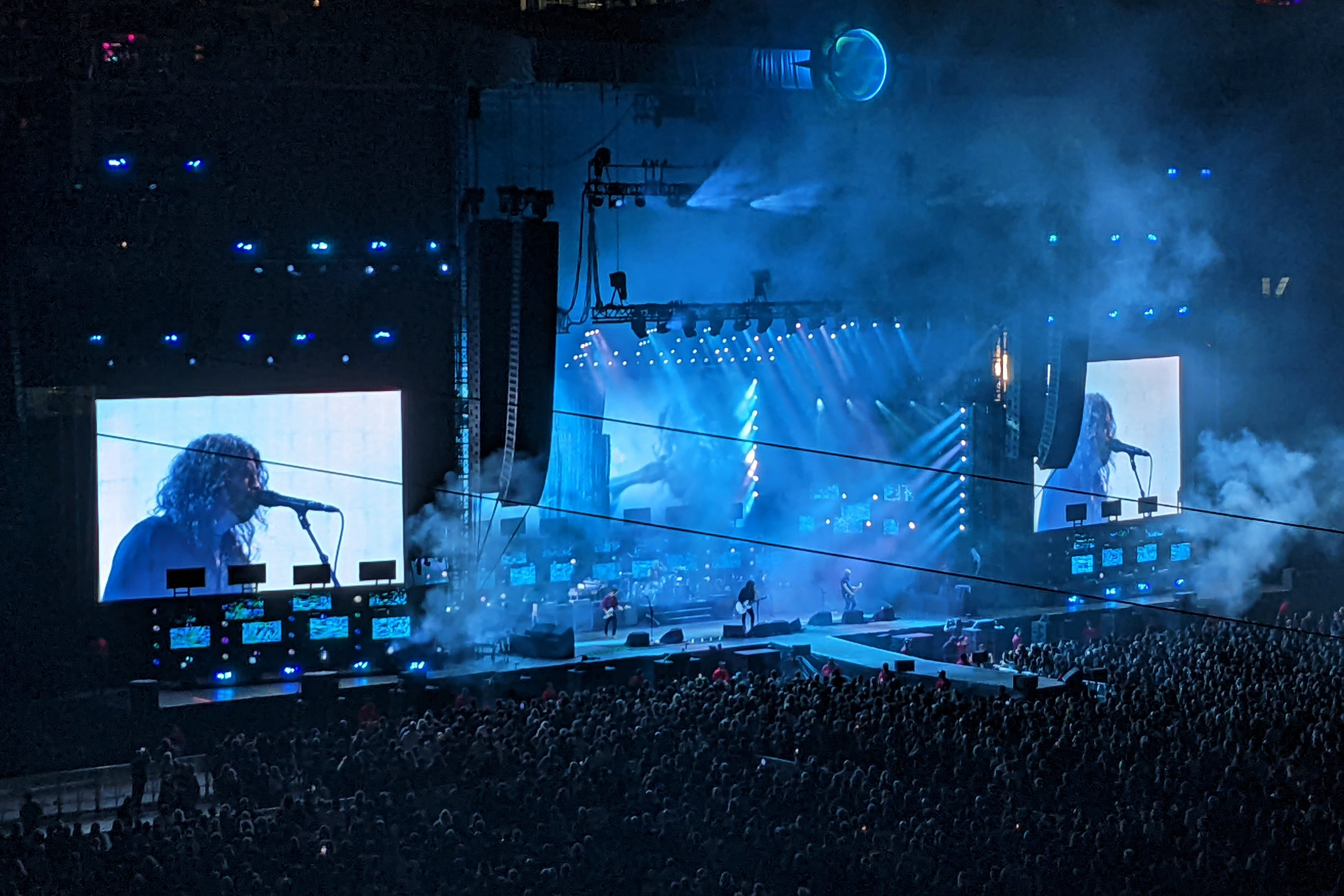
Foo Fighters performing in San Diego, California, on August 7, 2024

- A number of shows during the first US leg of the tour opened with "Bridge Burning", with "All My Life" moved before "Nothing At All" in the set list.
- At a number of shows, "Generator" was replaced by "White Limo", "La Dee Da" was replaced by "Stacked Actors", and "Breakout" was replaced with "Medicine at Midnight" or "This Is A Call".
- The songs played during the acoustic set rotated between "Skin and Bones", "Statues", "Big Me", "Under You" and "Ballad of the Beaconsfield Miners".
- Throughout the tour, "Aurora" was dedicated to Taylor Hawkins.
- On June 13 in Manchester, the first night of the UK leg of the tour, the band opened with "Monkey Wrench", swapping places with "All My Life".
- On June 13 in Manchester, the band debuted unreleased track "Unconditional" before "Aurora". This was played again on June 14 in Manchester and on June 17 in Glasgow.

== Tour dates ==
List of 2024 concerts
Date (2024)	City	Country	Venue	Opening act(s)	Attendance	Revenue
May 1	Dallas	United States	Dos Equis Pavilion	Nova Twins	19,692 / 19,692	$1,803,202
May 3 (Note: Part of the New Orleans Jazz & Heritage Festival.)	New Orleans	United States	Fair Grounds Race Course	—N/a	—N/a	—N/a
May 5 (Note: Part of the Shaky Knees Music Festival.)	Atlanta	United States	Central Park	—N/a	—N/a	—N/a
May 7	Raleigh	United States	Coastal Credit Union Music Park	Nova Twins	20,515 / 20,515	$1,705,090
May 9	Charlotte	United States	PNC Music Pavilion	Nova Twins	18,839 / 18,839	$2,040,123
May 11 (Note: Part of Welcome to Rockville.)	Daytona Beach	United States	Daytona International Speedway	—N/a	—N/a	—N/a
June 13	Manchester	England	Emirates Old Trafford	Wet Leg; Loose Articles	—	—
June 15	Manchester	England	Emirates Old Trafford	Courtney Barnett; Chroma	—	—
June 17	Glasgow	Scotland	Hampden Park	Courtney Barnett; Honeyblood	52,340 / 52,340	$5,246,594
June 20	London	England	London Stadium	Wet Leg; Shame	—	—
June 22	London	England	London Stadium	Courtney Barnett; Hot Milk	—	—
June 25	Cardiff	Wales	Principality Stadium	Wet Leg; Himalayas	—	—
June 27	Birmingham	England	Villa Park	Courtney Barnett; Hot Milk	—	—
June 30 (Note: Part of Hellfest.)	Clisson	France	Val de Moine	—N/a	—N/a	—N/a
July 3	Gdynia	Poland	Lotnisko Gdynia-Kosakowo	—N/a	—N/a	—N/a
July 5 (Note: Part of the Roskilde Festival.)	Roskilde	Denmark	Dyrskuepladsen	—N/a	—N/a	—N/a
July 7 (Note: Part of Rock Werchter.)	Werchter	Belgium	Festivalpark Werchter	—N/a	—N/a	—N/a
July 17	New York City	United States	Citi Field	Pretenders; Mammoth WVH	69,936 / 69,936	$9,588,706
July 19	New York City	United States	Citi Field	The Hives; Amyl and the Sniffers	69,936 / 69,936	$9,588,706
July 21	Boston	United States	Fenway Park	The Hives; Amyl and the Sniffers	35,984 / 35,984	$5,346,663
July 23	Hershey	United States	Hersheypark Stadium	The Hives; Amyl and the Sniffers	30,226 / 30,226	$4,069,689
July 25	Cincinnati	United States	Great American Ballpark	Pretenders; Mammoth WVH	35,761 / 35,761	$4,925,727
July 28	Minneapolis	United States	Target Field	Pretenders; L7	38,603 / 38,603	$5,333,250
August 3	Denver	United States	Empower Field at Mile High	Pretenders; Mammoth WVH	—	—
August 7	San Diego	United States	Petco Park	The Hives; Alex G	—	—
August 9	Los Angeles	United States	BMO Stadium	The Hives; Amyl and the Sniffers	42,614 / 42,614	$6,500,000
August 11	Los Angeles	United States	BMO Stadium	Pretenders; Alex G	42,614 / 42,614	$6,500,000
August 13	Concord	United States	Toyota Pavilion	L7	12,305 / 12,305	$1,700,000
August 16	Portland	United States	Providence Park	Pretenders; Alex G	—	—
August 18	Seattle	United States	T-Mobile Park	Pretenders; Alex G	—	—

== Personnel ==
Foo Fighters

- Dave Grohl – lead vocals, guitar
- Nate Mendel – bass, backing vocals
- Chris Shiflett – guitar, backing vocals
- Pat Smear – guitar
- Rami Jaffee – keyboards
- Josh Freese – drums
