= Your Favorite Toy (song) =

Single by Foo Fighters

from the album Your Favorite Toy
- Released: February 19, 2026
- Studio: Dave Grohl's home
- Genre: Hard rock
- Length: 2:56
- Label: Roswell; RCA
- Songwriter: Foo Fighters
- Producers: Foo Fighters; Oliver Roman

Foo Fighters singles chronology
"Asking for a Friend" (2025)	"Your Favorite Toy" (2026)	"Caught in the Echo" (2026)

"Your Favorite Toy" is a song by the American rock band Foo Fighters, released as the second single from their 2026 album of the same name.

== Background ==
Former Foo Fighters drummer Taylor Hawkins passed away on March 25, 2022 and after the release of the But Here We Are in 2023, the band decided to not release any new music for almost 2 years, when the band released a cover of Minor Threat's "I Don't Wanna Hear It" was released on June 20, 2025, less than 2 weeks later, a new song titled "Today's Song" was released on July 2, 2025. As Grohl said about the song: "We stumbled upon it after experimenting with different sounds and dynamics for over a year, and the day it took shape I knew that we had to follow its lead. It was the fuse to the powder keg of songs we wound up recording for this record. It feels new."

== Release and reception ==
"Your Favorite Toy" was released the same day the album of the same name was announced. The single was well received, with critics calling it a "nothing short of an insidious earworm." Writing for Rolling Stone, Rory Grow called it a "three-minute hard-rocker", noting it "is the sort of taut, electrifying blend of rock-for-the-sake-of-rock, Seventies-era glitter metal and power pop that Dave Grohl and company have perfected in recent decades." Ultimate Classic Rock writer Bryan Rolli wrote that it "combines Dave Grohl's snarling vocals and anthemic choruses with crunchy, garage-rock style riffs and an urgent, dance-adjacent groove."

== Personnel ==
Credits adapted from Your Favorite Toy liner notes, except where noted.

Foo Fighters

- Dave Grohl – guitar, vocals
- Pat Smear – guitar
- Chris Shiflett – guitar
- Nate Mendel – bass
- Rami Jaffee – piano, keyboards
- Ilan Rubin – drums

Additional performer

- Harper Grohl – backing vocals

== Charts ==
Chart performance for "Your Favorite Toy"
Chart (2026)	Peak position
Canada Mainstream Rock (Billboard Canada)	4
Canada Modern Rock (Billboard Canada)	17
Finland Airplay (Radiosoittolista)	51
Italy Rock Airplay (EarOne)	2
Japan Hot Overseas (Billboard Japan)	12
New Zealand Hot Singles (RMNZ)	30
UK Singles Sales (OCC)	23
UK Singles Downloads (Official Charts)	21
US Hot Rock & Alternative Songs (Billboard)	34
US Rock & Alternative Airplay (Billboard)	3
