= Old Trafford Cricket Ground =

Cricket stadium in England

Coordinates: 53°27′23″N 2°17′11″W

Old Trafford

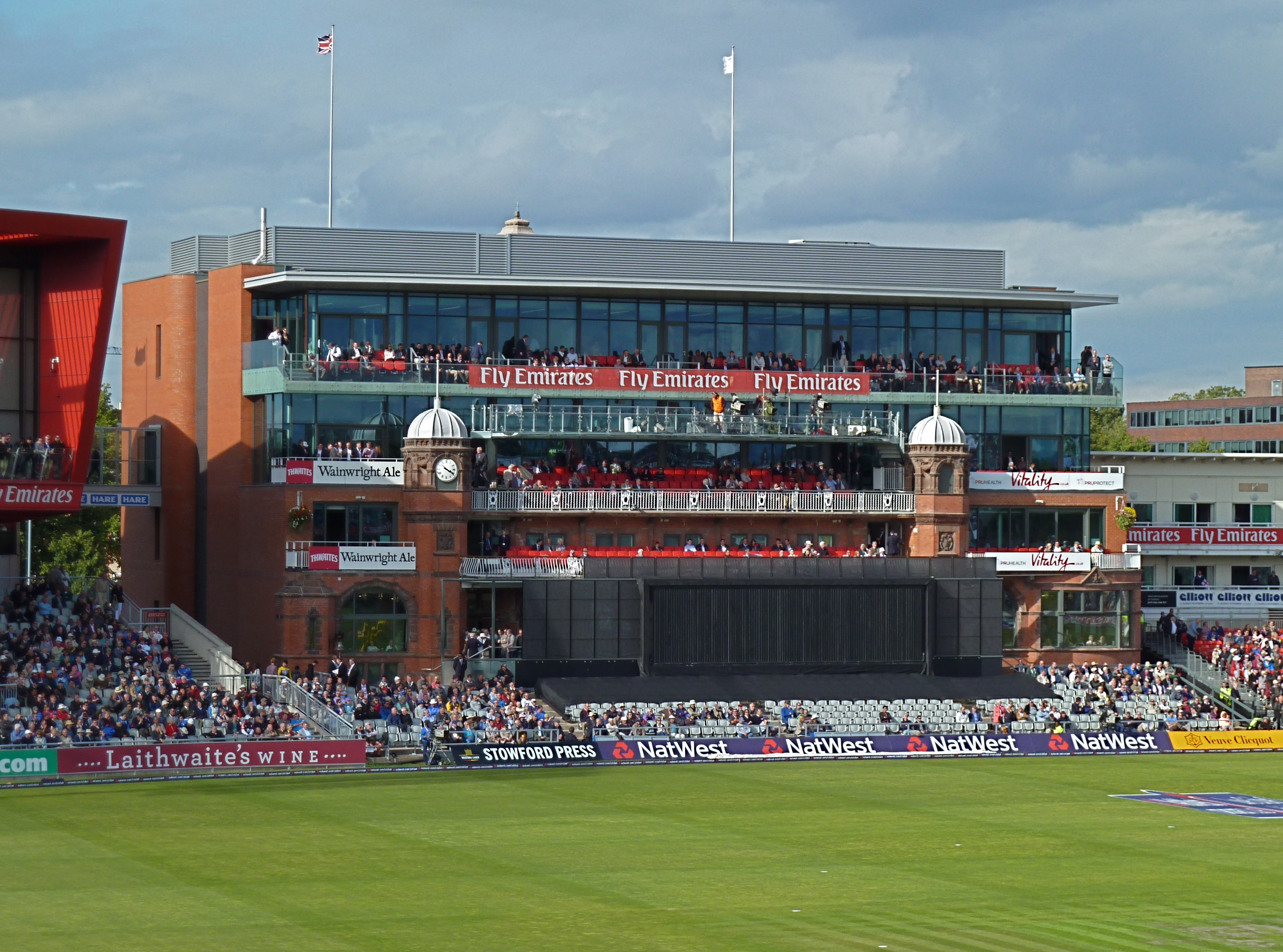
- Old Trafford Pavilion
- Interactive map of Old Trafford

Ground information
- Location: Old Trafford, Greater Manchester; England
- Country: England
- Establishment: 1857; 169 years ago
- Capacity: Domestic: 19,000; International: 26,000; Concerts: 50,000
- Tenants: Lancashire County Cricket Club; England cricket team England women's cricket team Manchester Super Giants
- Website: emiratesoldtrafford.lancashirecricket.co.uk
- End names
- James Anderson End Brian Statham End

International information
- First men's Test: 10–12 July 1884: England v Australia
- Last men's Test: 23-27 July 2025: England v India
- First men's ODI: 24 August 1972: England v Australia
- Last men's ODI: 22 July 2022: England v South Africa
- First men's T20I: 13 June 2008: England v New Zealand
- Last men's T20I: 19 September 2026: England v Sri Lanka
- Only women's Test: 19–21 June 1976: England v Australia
- First women's ODI: 6 July 1999: England v India
- Last women's ODI: 17 August 2004: England v New Zealand
- First women's T20I: 10 September 2012: England v West Indies
- Last women's T20I: 26 June 2026: Scotland v Sri Lanka

Team information
Manchester Cricket Club	(1857 – 1865)
Lancashire	(1865 – present)
Manchester Originals	(2021 – present)
- As of 1 September 2023; Source: ESPNcricinfo

Old Trafford is a cricket ground in Old Trafford, Greater Manchester, England. It opened in 1857 as the home of Manchester Cricket Club and has been the home of Lancashire County Cricket Club since 1864. From 2013 onwards it has been known as Emirates Old Trafford due to a sponsorship deal with the Emirates airline.

Old Trafford is England's second oldest Test venue after The Oval and hosted the first Ashes Test in England in 1884. The venue has hosted the Cricket World Cup five times (1975, 1979, 1983, 1999 and 2019). Old Trafford holds the record for both most World Cup matches hosted (17) and most semi-finals hosted (5). In 1956, the first 10-wicket haul in a single innings was achieved by England bowler Jim Laker who achieved bowling figures of 19 wickets for 90 runs—a bowling record which is unmatched in Test and first-class cricket. In 1990, a 17 year old Sachin Tendulkar scored 119 not out against England, which was the first of his 100 international centuries. In the 1993 Ashes Test at Old Trafford, leg-spinner Shane Warne bowled Mike Gatting with the "Ball of the Century".

After Old Trafford lost Test status in 2009, extensive redevelopment of the ground to increase capacity and modernise facilities saw the restoration of the pavilion and creation of The Point, a £12 million stand overlooking the pitch.

== History ==
=== Early history ===
The site was first used as a cricket ground in 1857, when the Manchester Cricket Club moved onto the meadows of the de Trafford estate. Despite the construction of a large pavilion (for the amateurs—the professionals used a shed at the opposite end of the ground), Old Trafford's first years were rocky: accessible only along a footpath from the railway station, the ground was situated out in the country, and games only attracted small crowds. It was not until the Roses match of 1875 that significant numbers attended a game. When W. G. Grace brought Gloucestershire in 1878, Old Trafford saw 28,000 spectators over three days, and this provoked improvements to access and facilities.

In 1884, Old Trafford became the second English ground, after The Oval, to stage Test cricket: with the first day being lost to rain, England drew with Australia. Expansion of the ground followed over the next decade, with the decision being taken to construct a new pavilion in 1894.

The ground was purchased outright from the de Traffords in 1898, for £24,372, as crowds increased, with over 50,000 spectators attending the 1899 Test match.

In 1902, the Australian Victor Trumper hit a hundred before lunch on the first day; Australia went on to win the Test by 3 runs—the third-closest Test result in history.

Crowds fell through the early 20th century, and the ground was closed during the First World War; however, in the conflict's aftermath, crowd numbers reached new heights. Investment followed throughout the inter-war period, and during this time, Lancashire experienced their most successful run to date, gaining four championship titles in five years.

During the Second World War, Old Trafford was used as a transit camp for troops returning from Dunkirk, and as a supply depot. In December 1940, the ground was hit by bombs, damaging or destroying several stands. Despite this damage—and the failure of an appeal to raise funds for repairs—cricket resumed promptly after the war, with German PoWs being paid a small wage to prepare the ground. The 'Victory Test' between England and Australia of August 1945 proved to be extremely popular, with 76,463 seeing it over three days.

=== Post-Second World War ===
Differences of opinion between the club's committee and players led to a bad run of form in the 1950s and early 1960s; this consequently saw gate money drop, and a lack of investment. After 1964, however, the situation was reversed, and 1969 saw the first Indoor Cricket Centre opened. In 1956 Jim Laker became the first person to take all 10 wickets in a Test match innings, achieving figures of 10 for 53 in the fourth Test against Australia (the only other bowlers to take all 10 wickets in an innings are Anil Kumble of India in 1999 and Ajaz Patel of New Zealand in 2021). Having also taken 9 for 37 in the first innings, Laker ended the match with record figures of 19 for 90, which remains unmatched to this day. On 1 May 1963 the first ever one day cricket match took place at Old Trafford, as the Gillette Cup was launched. Lancashire beat Leicestershire in a preliminary knock-out game, as 16th and 17th finishers in the Championship the previous year, to decide who would fill the 16th spot in the One Day competition. Following Lancashire's reign as One Day champions in the 1970s, a programme of renovation and replacement was initiated in 1981. This changed the face of the ground to the extent that, now, only the Pavilion "is recognisable to a visitor who last watched or played a game in, say, the early 1980s". In 1981 Ian Botham hit 118, including six sixes (the second greatest number in an Ashes innings), which he has called "one of the three innings I would like to tell my grandchildren about". England went on to win the Ashes after being lampooned in the national media for such poor performances.

In 1990, Sachin Tendulkar scored his first Test hundred at the age of 17—becoming the second-youngest centurion—to help India draw. In 1993, Shane Warne bowled the "Ball of the Century" to Mike Gatting at the ground. In the same game, Graham Gooch was out handling the ball for 133—only the sixth out of nine times this has ever happened. In 1995, Dominic Cork took a hat-trick for England against the West Indies. In 2000, both Mike Atherton and Alec Stewart played their hundredth Tests, against the West Indies. In the Third Test of the 2005 Ashes series the match ended in a nailbiting draw, with 10,000 fans shut out of the ground on the final day as tickets were sold out. England went on to win the series regaining the Ashes for the first time since 1986/87. In 2020 the ground was used as one of two biosecure venues, alongside the Ageas Bowl, for the tours involving West Indies and Pakistan which were regulated due to the COVID-19 pandemic.

Of the ten West Indies cricketers who have taken five-wicket hauls on Test debut, three of them – Alf Valentine, John Shepherd, and Daren Sammy – did so at Old Trafford.

== The ground ==
The cricket ground is near the Old Trafford football stadium (a five-minute walk away down Warwick Road and Sir Matt Busby Way), in the borough of Trafford in Greater Manchester, approximately two miles south west of Manchester city centre. Its capacity is 22,000 for Test matches, for which temporary stands are erected, and 15,000 for other matches. Since 1884, it has hosted 84 Tests, the third-highest number in England, behind Lord's and The Oval.

== The ends ==
The northern End is the James Anderson End, formerly the Pavilion End. ("The Point" is the distinctive, red conference centre immediately west of The Pavilion.)

The southern End is the Brian Statham End, named in honour of the former Lancashire and England player. The red building at this Statham (south) End is the Media & Players Centre. A section of Warwick Road to the east is also called Brian Statham Way. Immediately abutting the ground to the south-east is the Old Trafford tram stop.

Old Trafford has a reputation for unpredictable weather. Old Trafford is the only ground in England where a Test match has been abandoned without a ball being bowled—and this has happened here twice in 1890 and 1938, though before five-day Test matches were introduced. Before Cardiff hosted its first Test match in July 2009, Old Trafford was reputedly the wettest Test ground in the country; Manchester is situated to the west of the Pennines and faces prevailing winds and weather fronts from the Atlantic Ocean. These prevailing conditions have encouraged Lancashire to keep the ground as well-drained as possible, through the acquisition of a hover cover in 2005, and the installation of new drains towards the end of the 2008 season.

In the second Test of 1938 in a desperate effort to ensure play after heavy rain the groundstaff moved the turf from the practice pitch to the square—a unique attempt. In 2010–11 the square was relaid, changing its extremely unusual east–west axis to a more conventional north–south layout. The Brian Statham End (previously the Warwick Road End until 2003) to the east, and Stretford End to the west, were replaced by the Pavilion End to the north, and the Brian Statham End to the south.

=== The Pavilion ===
The Pavilion before and after redevelopment

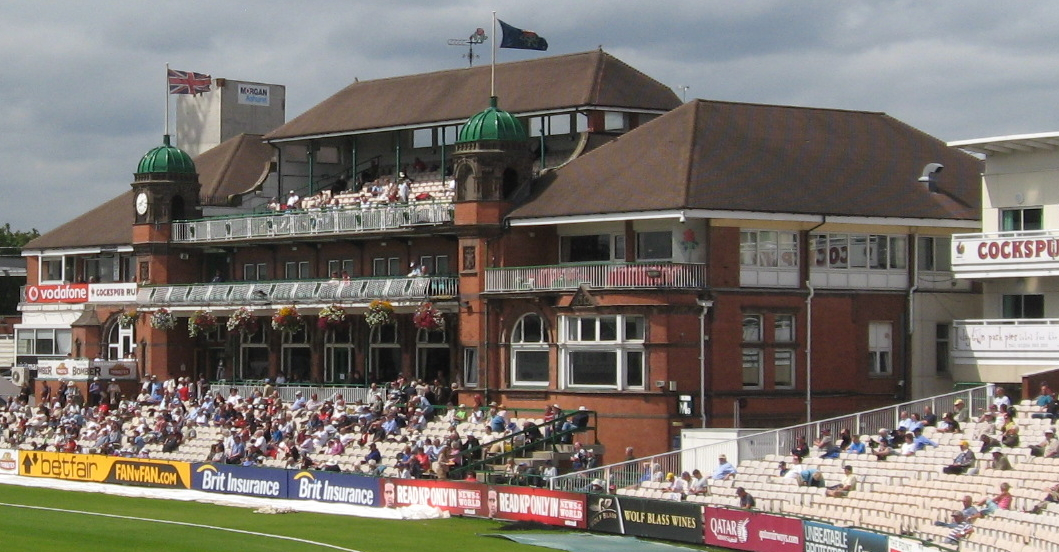
August 2009

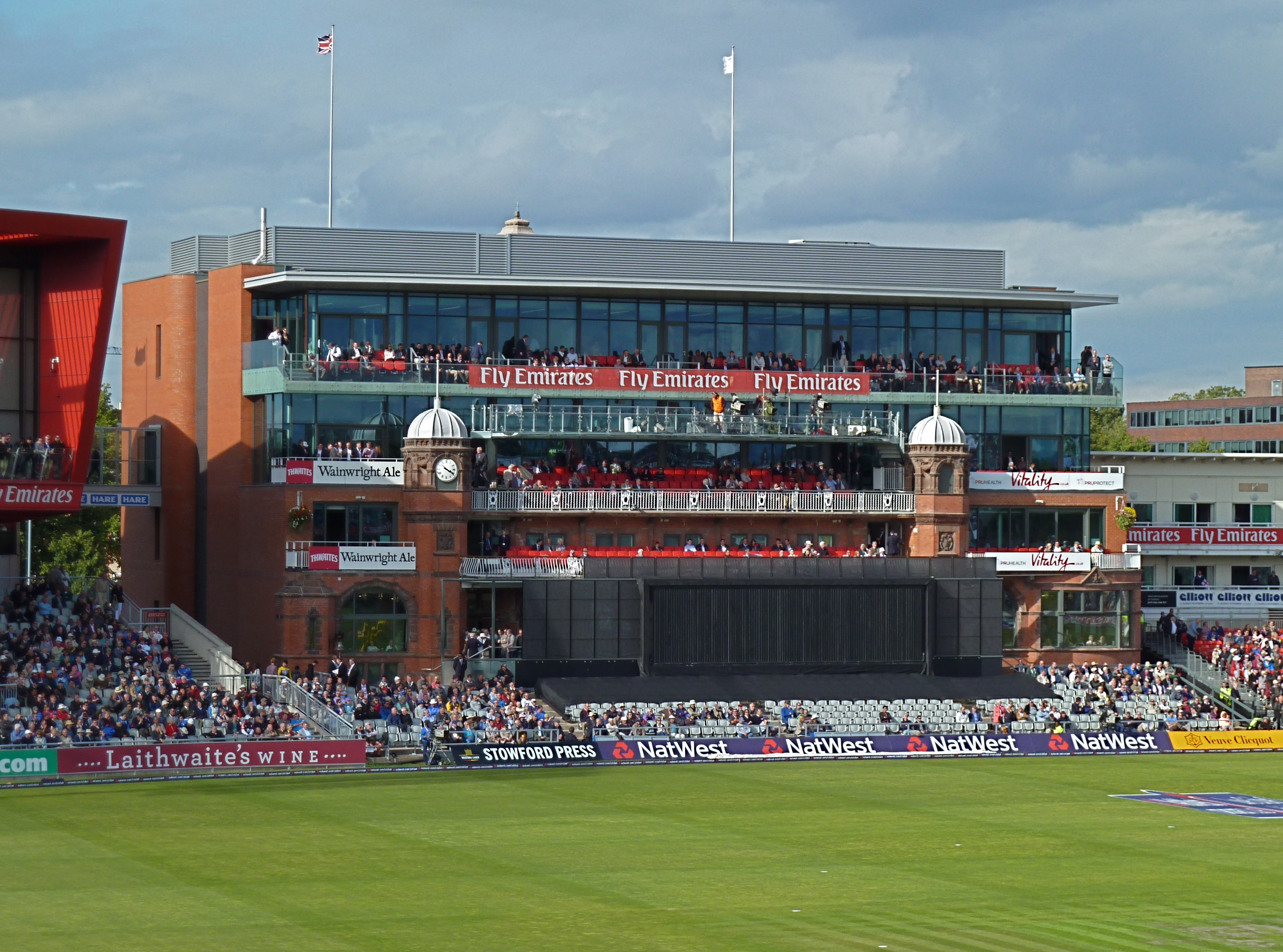
September 2013

The three-tiered Victorian members' pavilion was built in 1895 for £10,000. Hit by a bomb in 1940—which destroyed the members' dining room and groundsman's quarters—most of the pavilion was rebuilt. One million pounds was spent on a new roof after it began to leak in 2003.

The Pavilion's position was noteworthy in that, until 2010, it sat parallel to the pitches, rather than behind them, presenting the members with one of the worst viewing angles possible. It contains batting and bowling Honour Boards, unveiled during the 2004 Test match. The pavilion underwent redevelopment at the start of 2012 and was reopened for the YB40 game against Scotland.

When the bowler is operating from the southern Brian Statham End, television viewers will be looking at the Pavilion with its two clock towers directly behind the keeper.

=== The Point ===
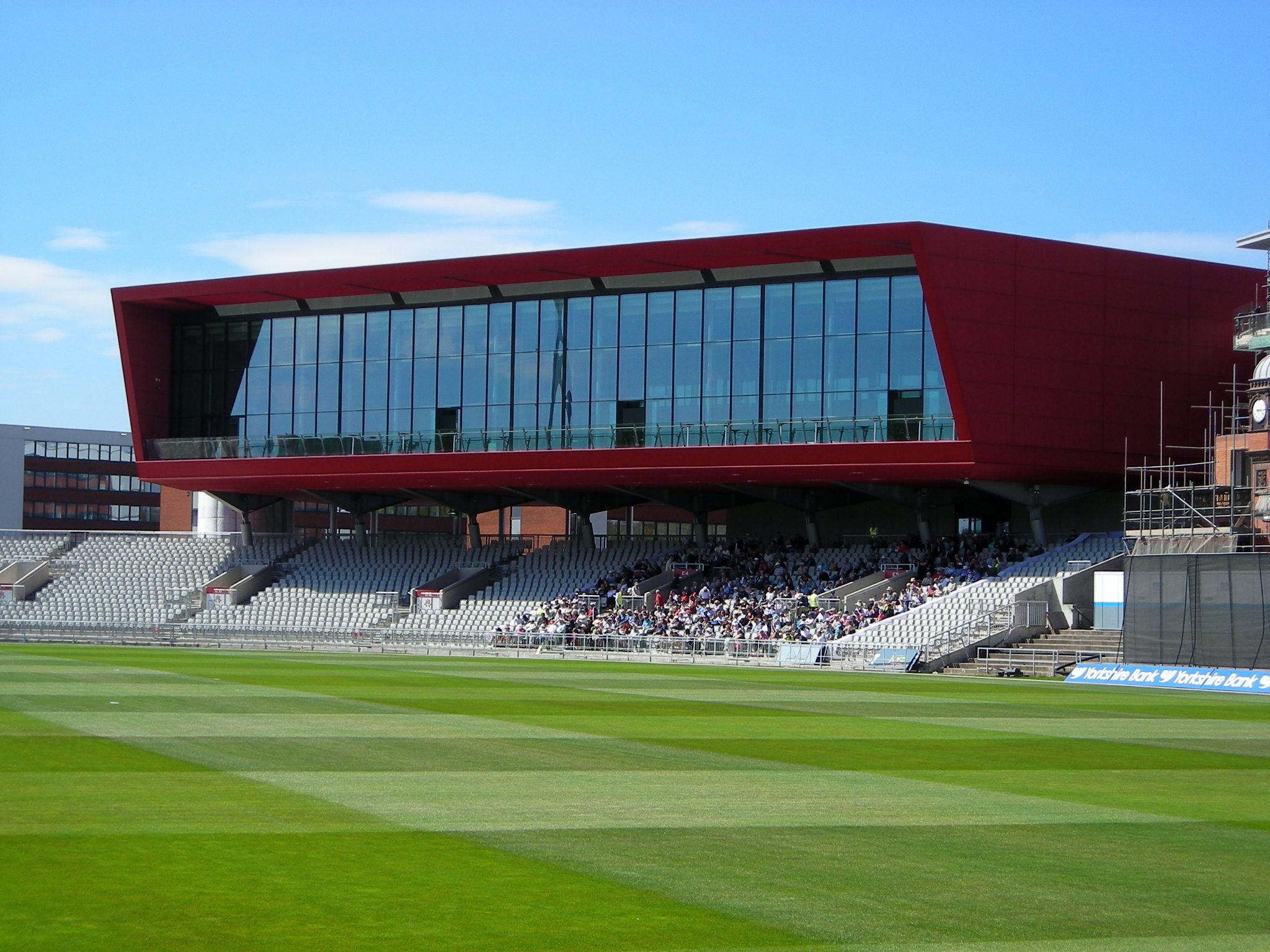
The Point, which was completed in 2010

The Point, Old Trafford's distinctive £12 million conference centre, and at 1,000 seats one of the largest multi-purpose conference facilities in North West England, opened in 2010. It is positioned immediately west of the Pavilion, and hence, is northwest of the cricket pitch.

=== Media and Players Centre ===
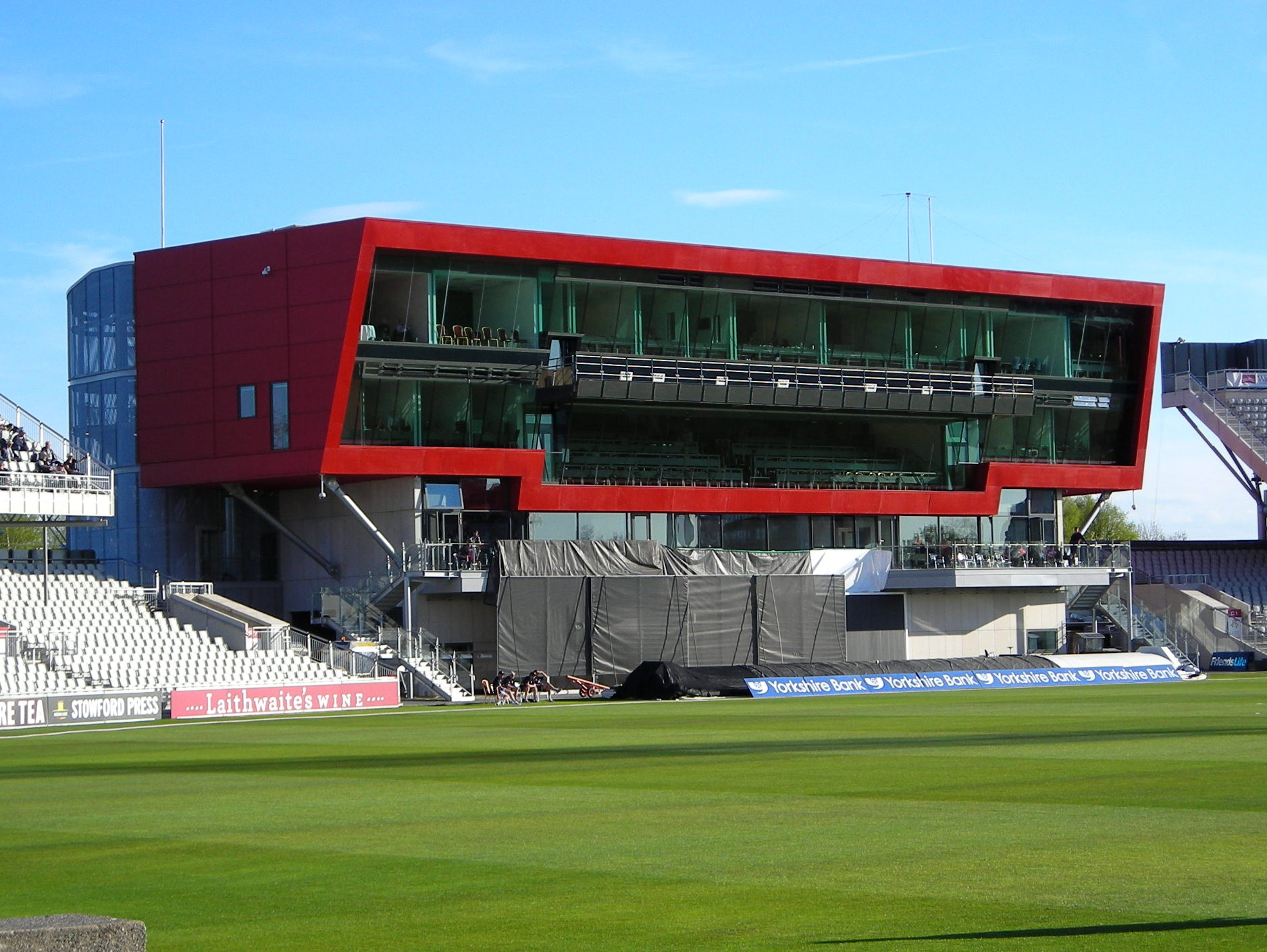
The Media and Players Centre which opened in September 2012

Old Trafford was unusual in that there were two media stands at opposite ends of the ground prior to the new Media Centre which opened in September 2012. Television and radio commentators previously operated in temporary television studios and commentary boxes at the Stretford End which were perched on hospitality boxes. The Media and Players Centre is at the Brian Statham End (southern end). When the bowler is operating from the northern James Anderson End, television viewers will be looking at the Media and Players Centre directly behind the keeper.

=== Cricket practice school ===
The idea of an indoor school was born in 1951, when nets were strung up in the Members' Dining Room in the pavilion. A permanent facility was built in 1969, and replaced in 1997. The current building stands to the north-west of the pitch; it contains five 60-metre lanes on various surfaces, several conference rooms, and a large shop.

=== The hotel ===
To the north-east of the ground, immediately adjacent to the Pavilion is a 150-bed Hilton Garden hotel which opened in late 2017. Similar in architecture to The Point on the other side of the Pavilion, half the rooms have a balcony with a full view of the pitch. Previously, this was occupied by the Old Trafford Lodge which opened in 1999. The hotel had 68 rooms, 36 having unobstructed views of the playing surface. It was demolished in 2016 and the new hotel opened in late 2017.

== Redevelopment 2003–2023 ==
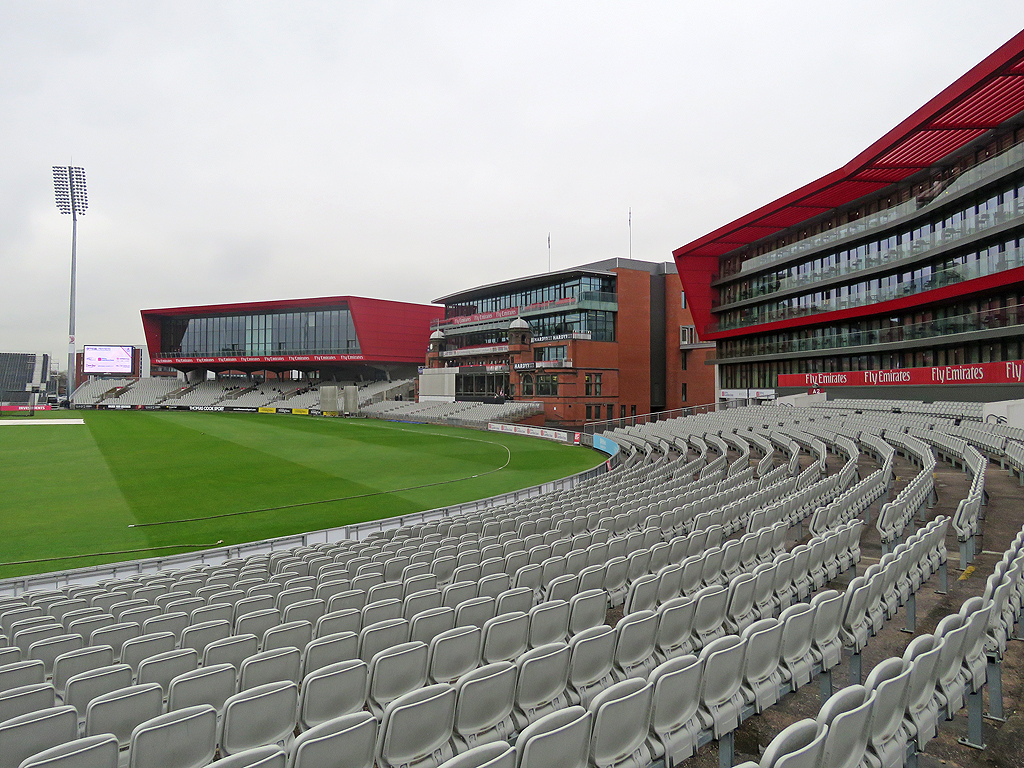
(L-R) The Point (opened 2010), The Pavilion (opened 2013), Hilton Garden Inn Emirates Old Trafford (opened 2017)

Following rejection of plans, in 2003, to sell Old Trafford, and move the club to a new purpose-built stadium in East Manchester, the focus was switched to upgrading the current ground. Lancashire CCC, with a coalition of businesses, are in the process of making the cricket ground the centre of an anticipated 750,000-square-foot (70,000 m^{2}) development, in a mixed-use scheme involving business, residential, retail, hotel and leisure facilities.

The first phase of redevelopment saw the laying of new drains in Autumn 2008. In 2009, the Stretford end of the ground was closed to facilitate destruction of the County Suite, Tyldesley Suite, 'K' and 'L' Stands and the scoreboard; The Point, overshadowing new seating to the west of the pavilion, opened in June 2010. During the 2010/11 winter the square was turned from its previous east–west axis to a more typical north–south alignment, which prevents the low evening sun from interfering with matches, and increased the number of available pitches by five, to sixteen. Many of Lancashire's home games for the 2011 season were transferred to out grounds while the new pitches 'bedded in'.

The main planning process began in September 2008, but faced stiff legal opposition. Since Tesco pledged £21 million to the redevelopment, the stadium's planning application included a request for a new supermarket nearby. Trafford Council gave this joint proposal permission in March 2010—a decision which was initially called in by the Communities Secretary for Judicial Review, before the go-ahead was given in September 2010. Derwent Holdings, a property development company denied permission to build a supermarket at the nearby White City retail park, then called for a Judicial Review. Although this was turned down by the High Court in March 2011, the case went to the Court of Appeal. Lancashire took the risky decision to begin work ahead of the matter being resolved, in order to qualify for grants from the North West Development Agency before it was wound up. However, the Court of Appeal ruled in Lancashire's favour in July 2011, and denied leave to further appeal.

Work therefore began on this main phase in summer 2011, beginning with the installation of permanent floodlights and a new video screen. A new 'Players and Media' facility, mimicking to some degree the design of The Point, has been built on the site of the demolished Washbrook-Statham stand, with a two-tiered cantilever stand being erected on either side. The Pavilion has been renovated to have its sloped roof replaced with two modern glass storeys, finished in April 2013.

The media facilities and corporate boxes on the western side of the ground have been demolished, leaving an empty space, which will be used for temporary seating or a stage when required.

The Old Trafford Lodge opened in 1999; however, it has been since demolished and replaced by the Hilton Garden Inn Emirates Old Trafford. It is a Hilton Garden Inn 150-bedroom hotel for Hilton Worldwide. It completed its first phase in July 2017. In 2023, an extension was built to the hotel replacing the demolished Red Rose Suite. It was completed in time for the 2023 Ashes series.

== Uses ==
=== Cricket ===
The ground is used heavily throughout the summer as the base of Lancashire County Cricket Club, with other home games being played at Stanley Park, Blackpool, Birkdale in Southport and at Aigburth in Liverpool. Until 2008, Old Trafford commonly hosted a Test match each year; none were hosted in 2009, 2011 or 2012 due to sub-standard facilities, although following redevelopment, Old Trafford hosted an Ashes Test in 2013, and further Tests in 2014 and 2016. One Day Internationals and/or International Twenty20s continue to be hosted every year.

In ODIs, the highest team score posted here is 397/6 by England against Afghanistan on 18 June 2019. The leading run scorers here are Eoin Morgan (456 runs), Jonny Bairstow (453 runs) and Graham Gooch (405 runs). The leading wicket takers are Bob Willis and Adil Rashid (15 wickets each) and James Anderson (14 wickets).

=== Musical venue ===
The ground is occasionally used as a venue for large-scale concerts, with a maximum capacity of 50,000. Although the old stage location, in front of the Indoor Cricket School, has been built on buildings on the western side of the ground, which were cleared in 2013 to allow space for a larger stage. The concert capacity increased to 65,000 after redevelopment.

Date	Event	Headline Act(s)	Supporting Act(s)
July 2002	Move Festival	David Bowie, New Order, Paul Weller, Green Day	Suede, The Divine Comedy, No Doubt, Ian Brown, Joe Strummer and the Mescaleros, Shed Seven, Haven, Doves, Elbow, Alfie
September 2002	Heathen Chemistry Tour	Oasis	Richard Ashcroft
May 2003	The Rising Tour	Bruce Springsteen	—N/a
July 2003	Move Festival	R.E.M.	John Squire, Badly Drawn Boy, Idlewild
July 2004	Move Festival	Madness, the Cure, Morrissey	Pixies, the Stranglers, Jimmy Cliff, Goldfrapp, Tim Booth, New York Dolls
June 2006	—N/a	Richard Ashcroft	Razorlight, the Feeling
June 2006	In Your Honor Tour	Foo Fighters	the Strokes, Angels & Airwaves, the Subways, Eagles of Death Metal
July 2007	'Mini-festival'	Arctic Monkeys	Supergrass, the Coral, the Parrots, Amy Winehouse
June 2008	In Rainbows Tour	Radiohead	Bat For Lashes, MGMT
August 2008	Accelerate Tour	R.E.M.	Guillemots, Editors
June 2009	Take That Present: The Circus Live	Take That	the Script, Lady Gaga
September 2009	Viva la Vida Tour	Coldplay	Jay-Z, White Lies
June 2010	21st Century Breakdown World Tour	Green Day	Joan Jett & the Blackhearts, Frank Turner
September 2010	The Resistance Tour	Muse	Editors, Band of Skulls, Pulled Apart by Horses
June 2011	Bon Jovi Live	Bon Jovi	Vintage Trouble, Xander and the Peace Pirates
June 2011	Come Around Sundown World Tour	Kings of Leon	White Lies, Mona
May 2015	Sonic Highways World Tour	Foo Fighters	Teenage Fanclub, God Damn
June 2016	Anti World Tour	Rihanna	Big Sean
July 2016	The Formation World Tour	Beyoncé	DJ Magnum
May 2017	—N/a	The Courteeners	The Charlatans, Blossoms, Cabbage
June 2017	One Love Manchester	Ariana Grande, Justin Bieber, Coldplay, Katy Perry, Miley Cyrus, Pharrell Williams, Take That, Niall Horan, Little Mix, Liam Gallagher, Robbie Williams, the Black Eyed Peas	
July 2017	A Moon Shaped Pool Tour	Radiohead	Oliver Coates, Junun
August 2018	Rize presents Liam Gallagher	Liam Gallagher	Richard Ashcroft, Bugzy Malone, Twisted Wheel
September 2021	Courteeners	The Courteeners	Johnny Marr, Blossoms
June 2022	Imploding the Mirage Tour	The Killers	Blossoms
June 2022	Love On Tour	Harry Styles	Mitski
June 2022	2022 Global Stadium Tour	Red Hot Chili Peppers	A$AP Rocky, Thundercat
June 2023	The Car Tour	Arctic Monkeys	The Hives, The Mysterines
June 2024	Everything or Nothing at All Tour	Foo Fighters	Wet Leg; Loose Articles
June 2024	Everything or Nothing at All Tour	Foo Fighters	Courtney Barnett; Chroma
June 2024	The Saviors Tour	Green Day	Nothing But Thieves & Maid of Ace

=== Other ===
The Hilton Garden Inn hotel, The Point, and other corporate facilities are open all year round, as are the ground's car parks, situated to the north and west of the ground.

== Transport ==
The ground is served by the adjacent Old Trafford tram stop on the Manchester Metrolink's Altrincham Line.

== Test cricket records ==
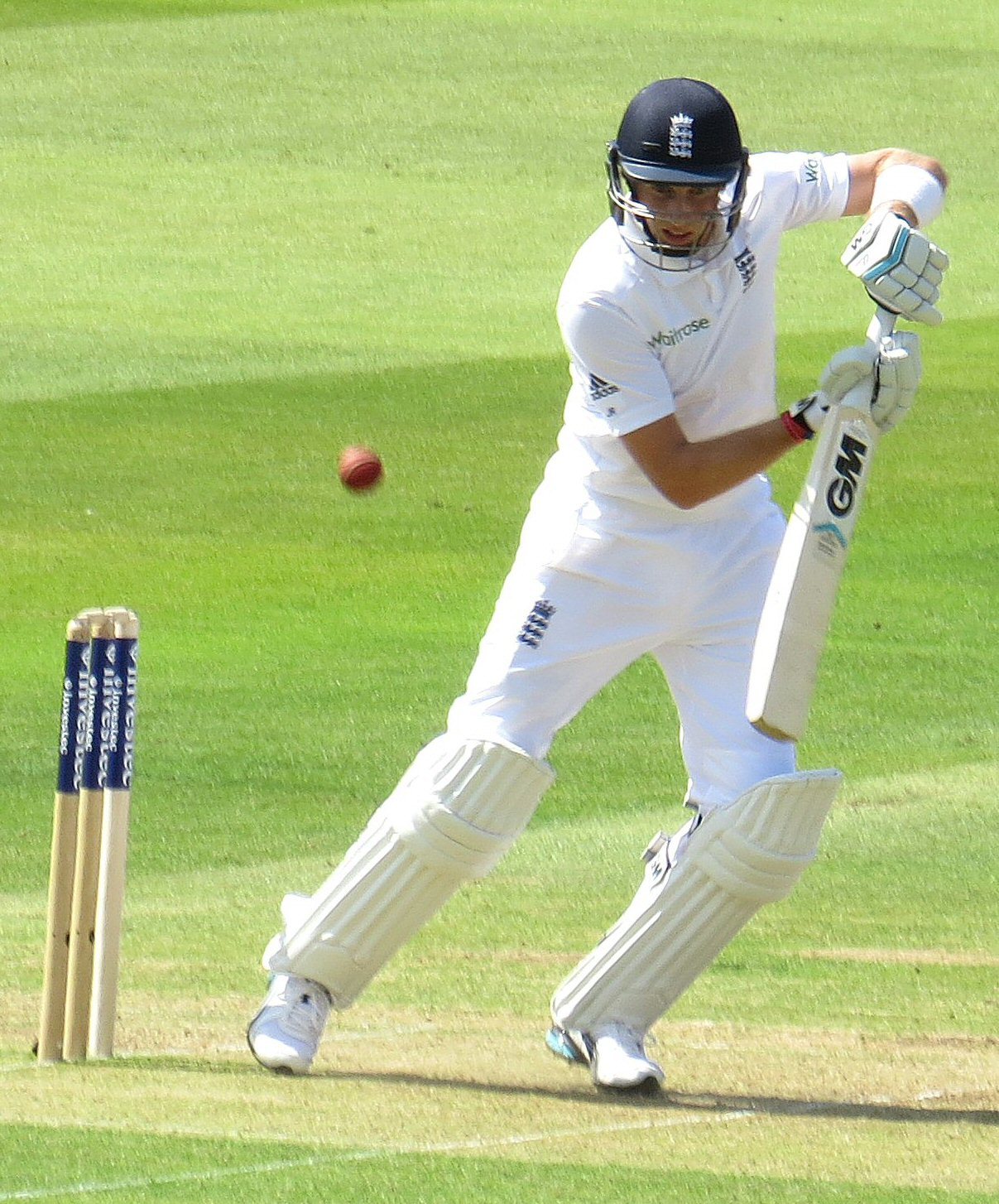
Joe Root holds the record for most career runs at Old Trafford.

=== Batting ===
Most career runs
Runs	Player	Period
1,128 (20 innings)	(England) Joe Root	2013–2025
818 (13 innings)	(England) Denis Compton	1939–1955
729 (18 innings)	(England) Michael Atherton	1990–2001
720 (13 innings)	(England) Ben Stokes	2016–2025
704 (14 innings)	(England) Alec Stewart	1992–2002

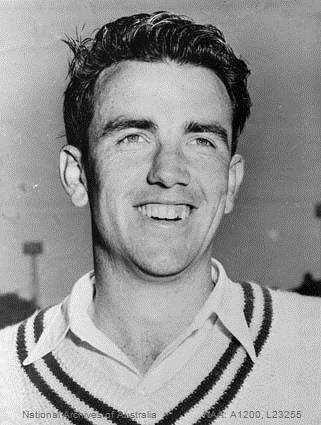
Bob Simpson scored 311 against England in 1964, the record score at the ground.

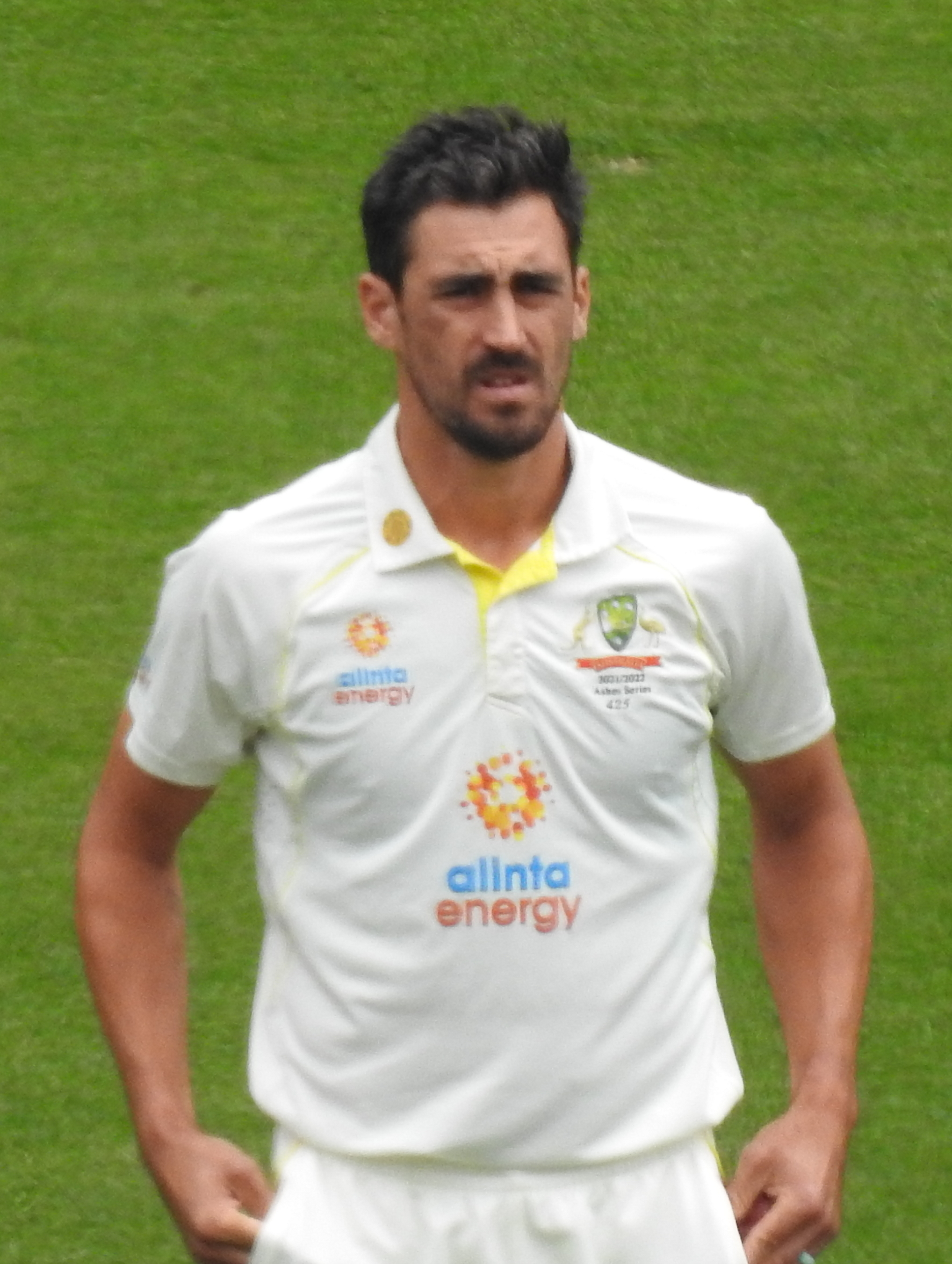
Mitchell Starc averages 170 with the bat, the highest of any player with 3+ matches at the ground.

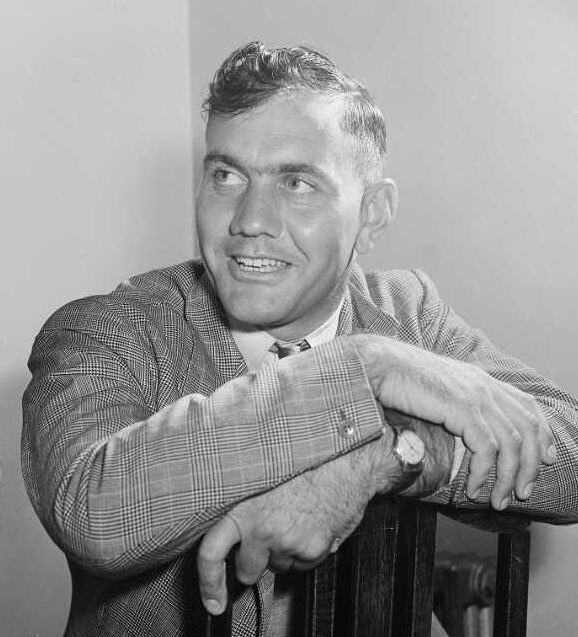
Alec Bedser has taken the most wickets at the ground, with 51.

Most career runs (non-England)
Runs	Player	Period
503 (5 innings)	(Cricket West Indies) Gordon Greenidge	1976–1988
459 (6 innings)	(Australia) Steve Smith	2013–2023
416 (7 innings)	(Australia) Allan Border	1981–1993
397 (5 innings)	(Australia) Steve Waugh	1989–1997
379 (6 innings)	(Australia) Bill Lawry	1961–1968

Highest individual scores
Runs	Player	Date
311 v. England	(Australia) Bob Simpson	23 Jul 1964
256 v. Australia	(England) Ken Barrington	23 Jul 1964
254 v. Pakistan	(England) Joe Root	22 Jul 2016
223 v. England	(Cricket West Indies) Gordon Greenidge	26 Jul 1984
211 v. England	(Australia) Steve Smith	4 Sep 2019

Most centuries
Centuries	Player	Period
3 (5 innings)	(Cricket West Indies) Gordon Greenidge	1976–1988
3 (13 innings)	(England) Denis Compton	1939–1955
3 (13 innings)	(England) Alistair Cook	2006–2017
3 (13 innings)	(England) Ben Stokes	2016–2025
3 (14 innings)	(England) Alec Stewart	1992–2002

Highest batting average (3+ matches)
Average	Player	Period
170.00 (5 innings, 4 NO)	(Australia) Mitchell Starc	2013–2023
142.00 (4 innings, 3 NO)	(England) Hedley Verity	1931–1936
119.00 (3 innings, 1 NO)	(England) Douglas Jardine	1928–1933
100.60 (5 innings, 0 NO)	(Cricket West Indies) Gordon Greenidge	1976–1988
99.25 (5 innings, 1 NO)	(Australia) Steve Waugh	1989–1997

=== Bowling ===
Most career wickets
Wickets	Player	Period
51 (14 innings)	(England) Alec Bedser	1946–1955
46 (21 innings)	(England) Stuart Broad	2008–2023
38 (22 innings)	(England) James Anderson	2004–2023
38 (16 innings)	(England) Chris Woakes	2014–2025
27 (9 innings)	(England) Jim Laker	1950–1956

Most career wickets (non-England)
Wickets	Player	Period
23 (5 innings)	(Cricket West Indies) Lance Gibbs	1963–1969
21 (6 innings)	(Australia) Shane Warne	1993–2005
21 (8 innings)	(Australia) Hugh Trumble	1893–1902
14 (4 innings)	(Australia) Terry Alderman	1981–1989
14 (4 innings)	(Australia) Dennis Lillee	1972–1981
14 (4 innings)	(Cricket West Indies) Malcolm Marshall	1980–1988
14 (5 innings)	(Australia) Graham McKenzie	1961–1968

Best innings figures
Figures	Player	Date
10/53 v. Australia	(England) Jim Laker	26 Jul 1956
9/37 v. Australia	(England) Jim Laker	26 Jul 1956
8/31 v. England	(Australia) Frank Laver	26 Jul 1909
8/31 v. India	(England) Fred Trueman	17 Jul 1952
8/104 v. England	(Cricket West Indies) Alf Valentine	8 Jun 1950
8/141 v. England	(Australia) Craig McDermott	1 Aug 1985

Best match figures
Figures	Player	Date
19/90 v. Australia	(England) Jim Laker	26 Jul 1956
13/244 v. Australia	(England) Tom Richardson	16 Jul 1896
12/112 v. South Africa	(England) Alec Bedser	5 Jul 1951
12/171 v. South Africa	(England) Tich Freeman	27 Jul 1929
11/68 v. Australia	(England) Bobby Peel	30 Aug 1888
11/76 v. Australia	(England) Bill Lockwood	24 Jul 1902
11/76 v. Pakistan	(England) Steve Harmison	27 Jul 2006
11/93 v. India	(England) Alec Bedser	20 Jul 1946
11/157 v. England	(Cricket West Indies) Lance Gibbs	6 Jun 1963
11/204 v. England	(Cricket West Indies) Alf Valentine	8 Jun 1950

Lowest strike rate (4+ innings)
Strike rate	Player	Period
28.9 (17 wickets)	(England) Wilfred Rhodes	1902–1912
29.0 (12 wickets)	(Cricket West Indies) Andy Roberts	1976–1980
29.6 (3 wickets)	(Cricket West Indies) Frank Worrell	1950–1963
32.0 (14 wickets)	(Cricket West Indies) Malcolm Marshall	1980–1988
32.2 (12 wickets)	(England) Johnny Wardle	1953–1954

=== Team records ===
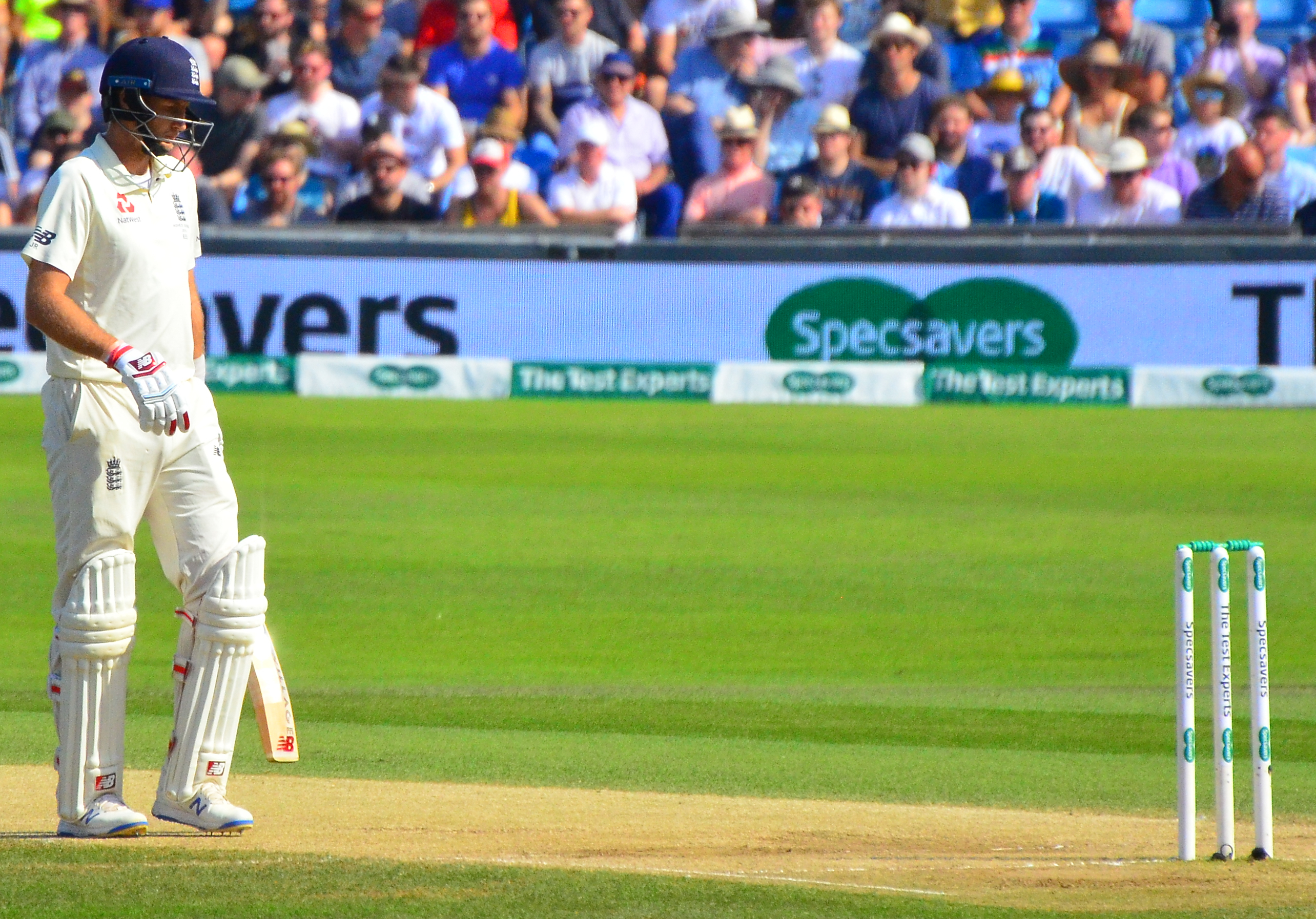
Joe Root topscored with 150, as England totalled 669 in 2025.

Highest innings scores
Score	Team	Date
669	England v. India	23 Jul 2025
656/8d	Australia v. England	23 Jul 1964
627/9d	England v. Australia	6 Jul 1934
611	England v. Australia	23 Jul 1964
592	England v. Australia	19 Jul 2023

Lowest completed innings
Score	Team	Date
58	India v. England	17 Jul 1952
70	Australia v. England	30 Aug 1888
71	England v. West Indies	8 Jul 1976
81	Australia v. England	30 Aug 1888
82	India v. England	17 Jul 1952

=== Partnership records ===
Highest partnerships
Runs	Wicket	Players	Match	Date
267	3rd	Graham Thorpe (138) & Michael Vaughan (120)	England v. Pakistan	31 May 2001
260	4th	Ben Stokes (176) & Dom Sibley (120)	England v. West Indies	16 Jul 2020
246	3rd	Ken Barrington (256) & Ted Dexter (174)	England v. Australia	23 Jul 1964
245	3rd	Frank Woolley (154) & Bob Wyatt (113)	England v. South Africa	27 Jul 1929
238	2nd	Gary Kirsten (210) & Jacques Kallis (132)	South Africa v. England	2 Jul 1998

Highest partnerships by wicket
Runs	Wicket	Players	Match	Date
225	1st	Michael Atherton (131) & Graham Gooch (116)	England v. India	9 Aug 1990
238	2nd	Gary Kirsten (210) & Jacques Kallis (132)	South Africa v. England	2 Jul 1998
267	3rd	Graham Thorpe (138) & Michael Vaughan (120)	England v. Pakistan	31 May 2001
260	4th	Ben Stokes (176) & Dom Sibley (120)	England v. West Indies	16 Jul 2020
219	5th	Bob Simpson (311) & Brian Booth (98)	Australia v. England	23 Jul 1964
180*	6th	Ian Healy (102*) & Steve Waugh (78*)	Australia v. England	3 Jun 1993
160*	7th	Sachin Tendulkar (119*) & Manoj Prabhakar (67*)	India v. England	9 Aug 1990
168	8th	Ray Illingworth (107) & Peter Lever (88*)	England v. India	5 Aug 1971
104	9th	Rod Marsh (91) & John Gleeson (30)	Australia v. England	8 Jun 1972
98	10th	Alan Davidson (77*) & Graham McKenzie (32)	Australia v. England	27 Jul 1961

Last updated 24 October 2025.

== See also ==
- Lancashire County Cricket Club in 2005
- List of cricket grounds in England and Wales
- List of Test cricket grounds
