= Show Me How (Foo Fighters song) =

Single by Foo Fighters

from the album But Here We Are
- Released: May 25, 2023
- Genre: Shoegaze
- Length: 4:53
- Label: Roswell; RCA
- Songwriters: Dave Grohl; Rami Jaffee; Nate Mendel; Chris Shiflett; Pat Smear
- Producers: Foo Fighters; Greg Kurstin

Foo Fighters singles chronology
"Under You" (2023)	"Show Me How" (2023)	"The Teacher" (2023)

Music video
- "Show Me How" on YouTube

"Show Me How" is a song by American rock band Foo Fighters released as the third single from their eleventh studio album, But Here We Are, on May 25, 2023.

== Composition and lyrics ==
The song features Foo Fighters' vocalist, Dave Grohl, harmonizing with his daughter, Violet Grohl, who makes a guest vocal appearance on the song.

According to Liz Scarlett of Classic Rock magazine, "the track shimmers with dream-pop-style vocal melodies, serene guitars and moving lyrics about learning to navigate life without the guidance of someone who has recently passed: Where are you now? Who will show me how?.. You need not say anything to me, I hear you loud and clear...I'll take care of everything from now on'.

According to Revolver magazine, the song finds the band still dealing with the grief of the death of their drummer Taylor Hawkins who died in 2022.

Violet Grohl and Dave Grohl performed vocals together on the song live at the Glastonbury Festival in England on June 23, 2023.

== Personnel ==
Foo Fighters

- Dave Grohl – vocals, guitar, drums, production
- Rami Jaffee – keyboards, production
- Nate Mendel – bass, production
- Chris Shiflett – guitar, production
- Pat Smear – guitar, production

Additional musician

- Violet Grohl – vocals

== Charts ==
Weekly chart performance for "Show Me How"
Chart (2023)	Peak position
UK Rock & Metal (Official Charts)	17
US Hot Hard Rock Songs (Billboard)	21
