= List of international men's cricket grounds in England and Wales =

International men's cricket was first played in England in 1868 by the touring Australian Aboriginal cricket team, although it would not be until 1878 that the first tour by a team termed as representative was made by the touring Australians. The first Test match to be played in England came two years later in 1880 between England and Australia at The Oval. The same two sides played in the first One Day International to be held in England at Old Trafford during Australia's 1972 tour. In 2005, the Rose Bowl hosted the first Twenty20 International to be played in England during Australia's 2005 tour.

== Men's international grounds ==
Current Test, One Day International and Twenty20 International grounds
Current ODI & T20I grounds
Former Test Ground
Former ODI & T20I grounds

Locations of international men's cricket grounds in England and Wales

=== Active venues ===
Below is a complete list of grounds used for men's international cricket in England and Wales, listed in order of first use.

Name	Location	First	Last	Matches	First	Last	Matches	First	Last	Matches	Refs
Name	Location	Test			One Day International			Twenty20 International			Refs
The Oval	Kennington, London	6 September 1880; England v Australia	17 June 2026; England v New Zealand	109	7 September 1973; England v West Indies	3 June 2025; England v West Indies	77	28 June 2007; England v West Indies	30 May 2024; England v Pakistan	17	(Note: Hosted the first Test match in England in 1880.)
Old Trafford	Stretford, near Manchester	10 July 1884; England v Australia	23 July 2025; England v India	86	24 August 1972; England v Australia	22 July 2022; England v South Africa	57	13 June 2008; England v New Zealand	19 September 2026; England v Sri Lanka	15	
Lord's	St John's Wood, London	21 July 1884; England v Australia	27 August 2026; England v Pakistan	151	26 August 1972; England v Australia	4 September 2025; England v South Africa	71	5 June 2009; England v Netherlands	29 July 2018; Nepal v Netherlands	10	
Trent Bridge	West Bridgford, near Nottingham	1 June 1899; England v Australia	25 June 2026; England v New Zealand	68	31 August 1974; England v Pakistan	19 September 2024; England v Australia	51	6 June 2009; Bangladesh v India	14 September 2025; England v South Africa	14	
Headingley	Headingley, Leeds	29 June 1899; England v Australia	19 August 2026; England v Pakistan	83	5 September 1973; England v West Indies	2 September 2025; England v South Africa	48	18 July 2021; England v Pakistan	22 May 2024 England v Pakistan	2	
Edgbaston	Edgbaston, Birmingham	29 May 1902; England v Australia	9 September 2026; England v Pakistan	58	28 August 1972; England v Australia	29 May 2025; England v West Indies	65	5 July 2010; Australia v Pakistan	25 May 2024; England v Pakistan	8	
ODI & T20I grounds
Riverside Ground	Chester-le-Street	5 June 2003; England v Zimbabwe	27 May 2016; England v Sri Lanka	5	20 May 1999; Pakistan v Scotland	24 September 2024; England v Australia	22	8 September 2012; England v South Africa	6 June 2025; England v West Indies	5	
Sophia Gardens	Cardiff	8 July 2009; England v Australia	8 July 2015; England v Australia	3	20 May 1999; Australia v New Zealand	1 June 2025; England v West Indies	31	5 September 2010; England v Pakistan	10 September 2025; England v South Africa	11	
Rose Bowl	West End, near Southampton	16 June 2011; England v Sri Lanka	18 June 2021; New Zealand v India ICC World Test Championship Final	7	10 July 2003; South Africa v Zimbabwe	7 September 2025; England v South Africa	33	13 June 2005; England v Australia	10 June 2025; England v West Indies	13	
County Ground	Bristol	–	–	0	13 June 1983; New Zealand v Sri Lanka	29 September 2024; England v Australia	20	28 August 2006; England v Pakistan	8 June 2025 England v West Indies	7	

=== Former venues ===
Below is a complete list of grounds used for men's international cricket in England and Wales, listed in order of first use.

Name	Location	First	Last	Matches	First	Last	Matches	First	Last	Matches	Refs
Name	Location	Test			One Day International			Twenty20 International			Refs
Former Test Ground
Bramall Lane	Sheffield	only match: 3 July 1902; England v Australia		1	–	–	0	–	–	0	
Former ODI & T20I grounds
St Helen's	Swansea	–	–	0	18 July 1973; England v New Zealand	9 June 1983; Pakistan v Sri Lanka	2	–	–	0	
North Marine Road	Scarborough	–	–	0	26 August 1976; England v West Indies	15 July 1978; England v New Zealand	3	–	–	0	
County Ground	Northampton	–	–	0	11 June 1983; England v Sri Lanka	26 May 1999; India v Sri Lanka	3	–	–	0	
New Road	Worcester	–	–	0	13 June 1983; West Indies v Zimbabwe	22 May 1999; Sri Lanka v Zimbabwe	3	–	–	0	
Grace Road	Leicester	–	–	0	11 June 1983; India v Zimbabwe	27 May 1999; Scotland v West Indies	3	–	–	0	
County Ground	Southampton	–	–	0	16 June 1983; Australia v Zimbabwe	30 May 1999; Kenya v Sri Lanka	3	–	–	0	
County Ground	Derby	–	–	0	18 June 1983; New Zealand v Sri Lanka	28 May 1999; New Zealand v Pakistan	3	–	–	0	
Nevill Ground	Tunbridge Wells	–	–	0	only match: 18 June 1983; India v Zimbabwe		1	–	–	0	
County Ground	Chelmsford	–	–	0	20 June 1983; Australia v India	14 May 2023; Ireland v Bangladesh	6	–	–	0	
County Ground	Hove	–	–	0	only match: 15 May 1999; India v South Africa		1	–	–	0	
St Lawrence Ground	Canterbury	–	–	0	18 May 1999; England v Kenya	30 June 2005; Australia v Bangladesh	4	–	–	0	
County Ground	Taunton	–	–	0	11 June 1983; South Africa v Sri Lanka	31 May 1999; Bangladesh v Pakistan	6	only match: 23 June 2017; England v South Africa		1	
