= The Glass (song) =

Single by Foo Fighters

from the album But Here We Are
- Released: December 29, 2023
- Genre: Pop rock
- Length: 3:49
- Label: Roswell; RCA
- Songwriters: Dave Grohl; Rami Jaffee; Nate Mendel; Chris Shiflett; Pat Smear
- Producers: Foo Fighters; Greg Kurstin

Foo Fighters singles chronology
"The Teacher" (2023)	"The Glass" (2023)	"Today's Song" (2025)

Music video
- "The Glass" on YouTube

"The Glass" is a song by American rock band Foo Fighters, which was released as a double A-side single with a cover version of the same song by H.E.R. on December 29, 2023. The version by H.E.R. is the first track on the release and Foo Fighters' version is the second track. It was released as a 7 inch vinyl record and as an online digital release. Foo Fighters' original version was first released on their eleventh studio album, But Here We Are, in June 2023.

== Music video ==
Foo Fighters released a music video for their version of the song on the same day that their eleventh studio album, But Here We Are, was released on June 2, 2023.

== Track listing ==
All tracks are written by Foo Fighters.

"The Glass" single track listing
No.	Title	Length
1.	"The Glass" (by H.E.R.)	3:31
2.	"The Glass" (by Foo Fighters)	3:49
Total length:		7:20

== Charts ==
=== Weekly charts ===
Weekly chart performance for "The Glass"
Chart (2023–24)	Peak position
Canada Rock (Billboard)	3
Italy Rock Airplay (EarOne)	7
New Zealand Hot Singles (RMNZ)	16
UK Singles Sales (OCC)	39
UK Physical Singles (OCC)	6
UK Vinyl Singles (OCC)	5
UK Rock & Metal (Official Charts)	11
US Hot Rock & Alternative Songs (Billboard)	33
US Rock & Alternative Airplay (Billboard)	5

=== Year-end charts ===
2024 year-end chart performance for "The Glass"
Chart (2024)	Position
US Rock Airplay (Billboard)	10
