= Asking for a Friend =

Single by Foo Fighters

from the album Your Favorite Toy
- Released: October 23, 2025
- Studio: Dave Grohl's home
- Genre: Hard rock
- Length: 4:29
- Label: RCA
- Songwriters: Dave Grohl; Pat Smear; Chris Shiflett; Nate Mendel; Rami Jaffee; Ilan Rubin
- Producers: Foo Fighters; Oliver Roman

Foo Fighters singles chronology
"Today's Song" (2025)	"Asking for a Friend" (2025)	"Your Favorite Toy" (2026)

"Asking for a Friend" is a song by the American rock band Foo Fighters. It was released as a single on October 23, 2025, and appears on their twelfth studio album, Your Favorite Toy.

== Background ==
"Asking for a Friend" was first previewed on October 16, 2025 on the band's social media accounts with the caption "About to take flight...", alongside a link to the band's newsletter. "Asking for a Friend" is Ilan Rubin's first contribution to a Foo Fighters song. It was announced alongside a stadium tour, scheduled to start in June 2026 and will end in September 2026.

== Composition and lyrics ==
Musically, "Asking for a Friend" has been described as a melodic hard rock song, played at a midtempo. According to front man Dave Grohl, it is about "those who have waited patiently in the cold, relying on hope and faith for their horizon to appear", “Searching for 'proof' when hanging by a wish until the sun shines again."

== Release and reception ==
"Asking for a Friend" was released on October 23, 2025, and was seen by critics, specifically Clash magazine, as the band as taking themselves "back to basics". The band released Your Favorite Toy on April 24, 2026 with the song being the last track on the album. Critics believe the song to have a much darker tone than the band's previous single "Today's Song".

== Personnel ==
Credits adapted from Your Favorite Toy liner notes.

Foo Fighters

- Dave Grohl – guitar, vocals
- Pat Smear – guitar
- Chris Shiflett – guitar
- Nate Mendel – bass
- Rami Jaffee – piano, keyboards
- Ilan Rubin – drums

Production

- Foo Fighters – production
- Oliver Roman – production, engineering
- Mark "Spike" Stent – mixing
- Randy Merrill – mastering

== Charts ==
Weekly chart performance for "Asking for a Friend"
Chart (2025)	Peak position
Australia Digital Tracks (ARIA)	47
Canada Mainstream Rock (Billboard Canada)	1
Canada Modern Rock (Billboard Canada)	7
Colombia Anglo Airplay (Monitor Latino)	9
Czech Republic Modern Rock (IFPI)	13
Estonia Airplay (TopHit)	65
Italy Rock Airplay (EarOne)	3
New Zealand Hot Singles (RMNZ)	40
Paraguay Anglo Airplay (Monitor Latino)	14
UK Singles Sales (OCC)	61
UK Singles Downloads (Official Charts)	57
Uruguay Anglo Airplay (Monitor Latino)	14
US Hot Rock & Alternative Songs (Billboard)	26
US Rock & Alternative Airplay (Billboard)	1
