= Spit Shine =

Song by Foo Fighters

from the album Your Favorite Toy
- Released: April 24, 2026
- Studio: Dave Grohl's home
- Length: 3:21
- Label: Roswell; RCA
- Songwriter: Foo Fighters
- Producers: Foo Fighters; Oliver Roman

Music video
- "Spit Shine" on YouTube

"Spit Shine" is a song by the American rock band Foo Fighters, released as the sixth track on their twelfth studio album Your Favorite Toy (2026). The song received mixed reviews and a music video was made for it.

== Composition and lyrics ==
"Spit Shine" is a punk rock, rock, garage rock track which is described in a press release as a "nightmare come true for connoisseurs of disemboweling, dismemberment and rock and roll."

== Critical reception ==
In a review for Classic Rock magazine, Mark Beaumont states that it "spins and spirals past like a punk club en route to Oz." Steven Loftin writes that it "features Nate Mendel’s bass underlying the rollercoaster riff and some frenetic vocal work from Grohl." Clash magazine noted that in their review that it is a "punk-fuelled assault which hits the listener with a brilliantly unapologetic energy". The Times critic Will Hodgkinson notes that it "takes aim at Grohl’s own insatiable ambition." Raul Stanciu wrote in a Sputnikmusic review that it "successfully brings back the chaotic energy of the early days." Michele Yamamoto called it in an Under the Radar magazine review "arguably the most energetic offering, with minimal melody and maximal clipping."

== Music video ==
The song's music video starts with an emergency alert system flashing which reads; "This is not a test — a viral outbreak has occurred. It is highly contagious and potentially lethal. Please stay indoors and do not panic.," and after a few seconds, shows the band and a small audience performing the song in all white clothes in front of a Lemmy from Motörhead mural during a zombie apocalypse, where the zombies kill the audience members and, by the end of the video, the band can be seen splattered in blood. The video was directed by Dave Grohl and casting was done by his daughter Harper.

== Credits and personnel ==
According to the liner notes of Your Favorite Toy, except where noted:

- Dave Grohl – guitar, vocals
- Pat Smear – guitar
- Chris Shiflett – guitar
- Nate Mendel – bass
- Rami Jaffee – piano, keyboards, theremin
- Ilan Rubin – drums
