= Caught in the Echo =

Single by Foo Fighters

from the album Your Favorite Toy
- Released: March 20, 2026
- Studio: Dave Grohl's home
- Length: 4:02
- Label: Roswell; RCA
- Songwriter: Foo Fighters
- Producers: Foo Fighters; Oliver Roman

Foo Fighters singles chronology
| "Your Favorite Toy" (2026) | "Caught in the Echo" (2026) | "Of All People" (2026) |

"Caught in the Echo" is a song by the American rock band Foo Fighters, released as the third single from their 2026 album Your Favorite Toy.

== Background ==
"Caught in the Echo" was released as the third single from the Foo Fighters' twelfth studio album, Your Favorite Toy, ahead of the album's release, on March 20, 2026. The song is the first track on the album. As part of the promotion for the release, twenty personally burned CD singles which each featured individual hand-drawn artwork by Foo Fighters' frontman Dave Grohl and his daughter Harper Grohl, were hidden in various locations including indie record stores, grocery stores, book shops and pharmacies.

== Reception ==
In a review by Paul Cashmere, he stated that "Caught In The Echo" sets the tone immediately, opening with a repeated vocal refrain before surging into a dense wall of guitars and driving rhythm, capturing the urgency that has long defined Foo Fighters' studio and live work" and that "With 'Caught In The Echo', Foo Fighters have delivered a track that reinforces their core strengths while signalling a forward momentum for this next phase of the band". A review of the song in Rock Sound stated that "musically it harks back to the glitzy stomp of 2011's Wasting Light and melodic battery of 1999's There Is Nothing Left To Lose, but without ever feeling like a leftover from either era".

== Personnel ==
Credits adapted from Your Favorite Toy liner notes.

Foo Fighters

- Dave Grohl – guitar, vocals
- Pat Smear – guitar
- Chris Shiflett – guitar
- Nate Mendel – bass
- Rami Jaffee – piano, keyboards
- Ilan Rubin – drums

Production

- Foo Fighters – production
- Oliver Roman – production, engineering
- Mark "Spike" Stent – mixing
- Randy Merrill — mastering

== Charts ==
Chart performance for "Caught in the Echo"
| Chart (2026) | Peak position |
|---|---|
| Canada Mainstream Rock (Billboard Canada) | 15 |
| New Zealand Hot Singles (RMNZ) | 34 |
| UK Singles Sales (OCC) | 88 |
| UK Singles Downloads (Official Charts) | 83 |
