= But Here We Are =

Studio album by Foo Fighters
- Released: June 2, 2023
- Recorded: 2022–2023
- Studio: 606 West (Los Angeles)
- Genres: Alternative rock; post-grunge; arena rock
- Length: 48:08
- Labels: Roswell; RCA
- Producers: Greg Kurstin; Foo Fighters

Foo Fighters chronology
The Essential Foo Fighters (2022)	But Here We Are (2023)	Your Favorite Toy (2026)

Singles from But Here We Are
- 1. "Rescued" Released: April 19, 2023; 2. "Under You" Released: May 17, 2023; 3. "Show Me How" Released: May 25, 2023; 4. "The Teacher" Released: May 30, 2023; 5. "The Glass" Released: December 29, 2023

But Here We Are is the eleventh studio album by American rock band Foo Fighters, released on June 2, 2023. Produced by Greg Kurstin and the band itself, it is their first studio album since the death of their longtime drummer Taylor Hawkins on March 25, 2022. Frontman Dave Grohl performed and recorded the entirety of the album's drum tracks in Hawkins' absence. Five singles, "Rescued", "Under You", "Show Me How", "The Teacher" and "The Glass" were released ahead of the album. Drummer Josh Freese was announced as the band's new drummer for the Everything or Nothing at All Tour which supported the album.

But Here We Are is dedicated to both Hawkins and Dave Grohl's mother, Virginia, who died in August 2022.

== Background ==
As early as mid-2021, Dave Grohl had already been planning for a follow-up album to Medicine at Midnight (2021). Grohl noted that each album the band records is a response to the prior one, and in response to Medicine at Midnight, he was considering writing "an insane prog-rock record". Grohl had not even started writing said material, as the band was still focusing on touring in support of Medicine at Midnight. Despite this, all plans were abruptly cancelled after longtime drummer Taylor Hawkins unexpectedly died in March 2022. The band cancelled everything planned for the rest of the year, largely going quiet and leaving their future uncertain. In December 2022, a statement was released confirming that Foo Fighters would continue, but that they were "going to be a different band going forward".

Rumors of a new album arose in February 2023, when radio DJ Chris Moyles on the UK's Radio X casually mentioned a new album to be released in March. Moyles would later apologize for speaking out of turn on the subject, but refused to clarify his comments. The album was later officially announced on April 19, 2023, alongside its official title, But Here We Are. At the time of the album's announcement, a replacement for Hawkins had still not been publicly disclosed. Ultimately, it was revealed that Grohl performed the drums on the album, marking his first drumming credit on new Foo Fighters material since their 2006 single "Cold Day in the Sun".

== Recording and themes ==
The album is the third collaboration with producer Greg Kurstin, following Medicine at Midnight (2021) and Concrete and Gold (2017). The band described the album's sound as "sonically channeling the naivete of Foo Fighters' 1995 debut album, informed by decades of maturity and depth" while lyrically exploring "a brutally honest and emotionally raw response to everything Foo Fighters have endured recently [...] 10 songs that run the emotional gamut from rage and sorrow to serenity and acceptance, and myriad points in between." The album was also described as "the first chapter of the band's new life". Lyrically, the album explores Grohl coming to terms with not only Hawkins' death, but also that of his mother, Virginia, who died at an undisclosed-to-the-public time in 2022. "Under You", released as the album's second single, has been described as melodic punk.

== Release and promotion ==
The album was released on June 2, 2023. The first single, "Rescued", was released concurrently with the announcement of the album on April 19. A second song, "Under You", was released ahead of the album on May 17. Over 25 live shows in support of the album have been announced across North America and Europe. On May 21, Josh Freese was announced as the band's new drummer, and during the livestream they debuted the song "Nothing at All". Freese made his live concert debut on May 24, where the band debuted the album's title track. Another song, "Show Me How", was released on May 25 and features Grohl harmonizing with his daughter Violet.

== Reception ==
=== Critical ===
Professional ratings
Aggregate scores
Source	Rating
AnyDecentMusic?	8.2/10
Metacritic	86/100
Review scores
Source	Rating
AllMusic	4.5/5 stars
The Daily Telegraph	5/5 stars
Exclaim!	6/10
The Guardian	4/5 stars
The Independent	4/5 stars
Kerrang!	5/5 stars
NME	5/5 stars
The Observer	3/5 stars
Pitchfork	7.0/10
The Times	4/5 stars

But Here We Are received critical acclaim from critics. At Metacritic, the album has an average score of 86 out of 100, which indicates "universal acclaim" based on 22 reviews. Spin described it as "one of the strongest albums of the band's career" and concluded that "if you don't have a big, fat lump in your throat or head-to-toe goosebumps all over your body while listening to But Here We Are, you may not have a pulse." Kerrang! praised the album's emotional content, noting that "It's a miracle not only that it was made, but also that it boasts the mesmeric lyrical and musical qualities it does. Somehow Dave Grohl found a way to wrap words around the enormity of his grief as he surrendered to his own impossible circumstances." Clash's Emma Harrison described it as "Heartbreaking, but hopeful - this is a masterclass...with its heady hooks and exuberant riffs, But Here We Are is ambitious, poignant, and vivid in equal measure." Maura Johnston, writing for Rolling Stone, said that the album "depicts grief in immediate terms" and "possesses a vitality", describing it as "one of their best records ever".

In June 2023, Alternative Press published an unranked list of the top 25 albums of the year to date and included this release, calling it "nothing short of miraculous in the sense and sound of mastery and of hope that can be heard from the top track to the very last note".

=== Accolades ===
Numerous critics and publications listed But Here We Are in their year-end ranking of the best albums of 2023.

Select year-end rankings of But Here We Are
Publication/critic	Accolade	Rank	Ref.
Alternative Press	50 best albums of 2023	Placed	
Consequence	The 50 Best Albums of 2023	39	
Kerrang!	The 50 best albums of 2023	1	
Los Angeles Times	The 20 best albums of 2023	9	
Loudwire	The 25 best rock and metal albums of 2023	Placed	
Metacritic	The 40 Best Albums of 2023	34	
NME	The Best Albums of 2023	16	

== Commercial performance ==
But Here We Are debuted at number 1 on the UK Albums Chart with 44,500 chart units sold after an intense chart battle with Noel Gallagher's High Flying Birds album Council Skies, giving Foo Fighters their sixth UK number 1 album. The album tops the Billboard Top Alternative Albums and Top Hard Rock Albums charts, and debuts at number eight on the all-format Billboard 200 chart, moving 62,000 equivalent album units. Concurrently, "Rescued", topped the Hot Hard Rock Songs chart.

== Track listing ==
All tracks are written by Foo Fighters.

But Here We Are track listing
No.	Title	Length
1.	"Rescued"	4:18
2.	"Under You"	3:39
3.	"Hearing Voices"	3:48
4.	"But Here We Are"	4:43
5.	"The Glass"	3:49
6.	"Nothing at All"	3:27
7.	"Show Me How"	4:53
8.	"Beyond Me"	3:54
9.	"The Teacher"	10:04
10.	"Rest"	5:33
Total length:		48:08

== Personnel ==
Foo Fighters (Note: The band members' instruments are not credited in the album's liner notes. Their primary instruments are listed based on their de facto primary roles in the group.)

- Dave Grohl – vocals, guitar, drums
- Rami Jaffee – keyboards
- Nate Mendel – bass guitar
- Chris Shiflett – guitar
- Pat Smear – guitar

Additional musicians

- Violet Grohl – vocals on "Show Me How"
- Uncredited musicians – strings on "The Teacher"

Technical

- Greg Kurstin – production, string conducting on "The Teacher"
- Foo Fighters – production
- Mark "Spike" Stent – mixing
- Randy Merrill – mastering

== Charts ==
=== Weekly charts ===
Weekly chart performance for But Here We Are
Chart (2023)	Peak position
Australian Albums (ARIA)	1
Austrian Albums (Ö3 Austria)	2
Belgian Albums (Ultratop Flanders)	2
Belgian Albums (Ultratop Wallonia)	3
Canadian Albums (Billboard)	4
Danish Albums (Hitlisten)	25
Dutch Albums (Album Top 100)	2
Finnish Albums (Suomen virallinen lista)	6
French Albums (SNEP)	10
German Albums (Offizielle Top 100)	4
Greek Albums (IFPI Greece)	27
Hungarian Albums (MAHASZ)	37
Irish Albums (Official Charts)	3
Italian Albums (FIMI)	15
Japanese Albums (Oricon)	25
Japanese Digital Albums (Oricon)	11
Japanese Hot Albums (Billboard Japan)	26
Japanese Rock Albums (Oricon)	6
New Zealand Albums (RMNZ)	1
Norwegian Albums (VG-lista)	5
Polish Albums (ZPAV)	7
Portuguese Albums (AFP)	2
Scottish Albums (Official Charts)	1
Spanish Albums (Promusicae)	9
Swedish Albums (Sverigetopplistan)	8
Swiss Albums (Schweizer Hitparade)	1
UK Albums (Official Charts)	1
UK Rock & Metal Albums (Official Charts)	1
US Billboard 200	8
US Top Alternative Albums (Billboard)	1
US Top Hard Rock Albums (Billboard)	1
US Top Rock Albums (Billboard)	2

=== Year-end charts ===
Year-end chart performance for But Here We Are
Chart (2023)	Position
Belgian Albums (Ultratop Flanders)	148
UK Cassette Albums (OCC)	17
UK Vinyl Albums (OCC)	17
US Top Current Album Sales (Billboard)	42
US Top Rock Albums (Billboard)	44

== Certifications ==
Certifications for But Here We Are
Region	Certification	Certified units/sales
United Kingdom (BPI)	Silver	60,000^{‡}
^{‡} Sales+streaming figures based on certification alone.
