= Today's Song =

Single by Foo Fighters
- Released: July 2, 2025
- Genre: Alternative rock; arena rock
- Length: 3:16
- Label: RCA
- Songwriter: Foo Fighters
- Producers: Foo Fighters; Oliver Roman

Foo Fighters singles chronology
"The Glass" (2023)	"Today's Song" (2025)	"Asking for a Friend" (2025)

Music video
- "Today's Song" on YouTube

"Today's Song" is a song by the American rock band Foo Fighters, released as a standalone single on July 2, 2025. It is a tribute to former members of the band, which includes Josh Freese, William Goldsmith, Franz Stahl and Taylor Hawkins. The artwork for the single was made by Harper Grohl, Dave Grohl's daughter.

== Composition and lyrics ==
Over the years, we’ve had moments of unbridled joy, and moments of devastating heartbreak. Moments of beautiful victory, and moments of painful defeat. We have mended broken bones and broken hearts. But we have followed this road together, with each other, for each other, no matter what. Because in life, you just can’t go it alone.

— – Dave Grohl, 2025

"Today's Song" is a power ballad, described as a "blend of classic Foo Fighters alternative rock with a big arena epic." Its lyrics describe being optimistic and overcoming adversity.

== Release and reception ==
"Today's Song" was released six days after the day the band's eponymous debut album was released 30 years prior, and has been generally well received, with critics such as Chad Childers of Loudwire, who stated that it "starts a bit on the somber side before the guitars and drums come crashing in to make it the uplifting rocker that it is". It also has a lyric video.

== Personnel ==
Foo Fighters

- Dave Grohl – vocals, guitar, drums
- Rami Jaffee – keyboards
- Nate Mendel – bass
- Chris Shiflett – guitar
- Pat Smear – guitar

Technical personnel

- Foo Fighters – production
- Oliver Roman – production
- Harper Grohl – artwork

== Charts ==
=== Weekly charts ===
Weekly chart performance for "Today's Song"
Chart (2025)	Peak position
Australia Digital Tracks (ARIA)	48
Canada Mainstream Rock (Billboard Canada)	1
Canada Modern Rock (Billboard Canada)	2
Italy Rock Airplay (EarOne)	2
Japan Hot Overseas (Billboard Japan)	6
New Zealand Hot Singles (RMNZ)	28
UK Singles Sales (OCC)	45
UK Singles Downloads (Official Charts)	40
Uruguay Anglo Airplay (Monitor Latino)	12
US Hot Rock & Alternative Songs (Billboard)	34
US Rock & Alternative Airplay (Billboard)	1

=== Year-end charts ===
Year-end chart performance for "Today's Song"
Chart (2025)	Position
Canada Mainstream Rock (Billboard)	20
Canada Modern Rock (Billboard)	33
US Rock & Alternative Airplay (Billboard)	19
