= The Teacher (Foo Fighters song) =

Single by Foo Fighters

from the album But Here We Are
- Released: May 30, 2023
- Genre: Progressive rock; hard rock
- Length: 10:04
- Label: Roswell; RCA
- Songwriters: Dave Grohl; Rami Jaffee; Nate Mendel; Chris Shiflett; Pat Smear
- Producers: Foo Fighters; Greg Kurstin

Foo Fighters singles chronology
"Show Me How" (2023)	"The Teacher" (2023)	"The Glass" (2023)

Music video
- "The Teacher" on YouTube

"The Teacher" is a song by American rock band Foo Fighters released as the fourth single from their eleventh album, But Here We Are, on May 30, 2023.

== Composition and lyrics ==
According to Chad Childers of Loudwire, "The Teacher" deals with Foo Fighters' frontman Dave Grohl's mourning period, his mother Virginia and Foo Fighters' drummer Taylor Hawkins both having died in 2022. According to Jeffrey Goldberg, writing for The Atlantic, "The Teacher" is a tribute to Grohl's mother, Virginia, herself having been a school teacher, with the lyrics "Hey kid, what's the plan for tomorrow? / Where will I wake up? / Where will I wake up?".

== Music video ==
The song was released with a 10-minute music video that was made by Tony Oursler and included footage that had been filmed on VHS tapes more than 30 years ago. The video also references the passing of drummer Taylor Hawkins and Grohl's mother Virginia. Jon Blistein of Rolling Stone described the music video as "like a psychedelic collage, incorporating archival and stock footage and new sequences centered around Grohl and the band that have otherworldly, occult-like aura".

== Personnel ==
Sources:

- Dave Grohl – vocals, guitar, drums
- Nate Mendel – bass guitar
- Chris Shiflett – guitar
- Pat Smear – guitar

Additional musicians

- Uncredited musicians – strings

Production

- Greg Kurstin – production, string conducting
- Foo Fighters – production
- Mark "Spike" Stent – mixing
- Randy Merrill – mastering

== Charts ==
Weekly chart performance for "The Teacher"
Chart (2023)	Peak position
UK Rock & Metal (Official Charts)	32
