= Of All People (song) =

Single by Foo Fighters

from the album Your Favorite Toy
- Released: April 10, 2026
- Studio: Dave Grohl's home
- Genre: Punk rock
- Length: 2:34
- Label: Roswell; RCA
- Songwriter: Foo Fighters
- Producers: Foo Fighters; Oliver Roman

Foo Fighters singles chronology
"Caught in the Echo" (2026)	"Of All People" (2026)

"Of All People" is a song written and performed by the American rock band Foo Fighters, released as the fourth single from the band's twelfth studio album, Your Favorite Toy (2026). It is a punk rock track about survivor guilt.

== Background ==
"Of All People" was written by Dave Grohl after crossing paths with a drug dealer he had met back in the 1990s, which Grohl stated that "I hadn't seen them in 30 years, and they're alive, healthy and sober. I was so happy that this person survived, while at the same time, I was devastated, because of all of the people I know that we've lost to exactly that drug", he notes that "I was so fucking angry, but at the same time so grateful to see them alive and well. Again, a conversation within myself, feeling so conflicted and divided. When I read the lyrics back, I mentioned them to my therapist: is this survivor’s guilt?" The song also talks about survivor's guilt. It also sees Grohl reflecting on life's unfairness.

== Release and reception ==
The single was released on April 10, 2026, by Roswell Records and RCA Records. Critics such as Jack Rogers of Rock Sound stated that it is "spiked with plenty of spite and malice between its caustic riffs. Delivered with a sneer and a shake, Dave Grohl deals out the sort of performance that you wouldn’t want to be on the other end of, whilst the band produce a litter of slick riffs and infectious melodies." Blabbermouth called it an "early HÜSKER DÜ-esque rager"

== Personnel ==
Credits adapted from Your Favorite Toy liner notes.

Foo Fighters

- Dave Grohl – guitar, vocals
- Pat Smear – guitar
- Chris Shiflett – guitar
- Nate Mendel – bass
- Rami Jaffee – piano, keyboards
- Ilan Rubin – drums

Production

- Foo Fighters – production
- Oliver Roman – production, engineering
- Mark "Spike" Stent – mixing
- Randy Merrill — mastering

== Charts ==
Chart performance for "Of All People"
Chart (2026)	Peak position
New Zealand Hot Singles (RMNZ)	38
Italy Rock Airplay (EarOne)	16
