= Your Favorite Toy =

Studio album by Foo Fighters
- Released: April 24, 2026
- Recorded: 2024–2025
- Studio: Dave Grohl's home
- Genres: Garage rock; hard rock
- Length: 36:26
- Labels: Roswell; RCA
- Producers: Foo Fighters; Oliver Roman

Foo Fighters chronology
But Here We Are (2023)	Your Favorite Toy (2026)

Singles from Your Favorite Toy
- 1. "Asking for a Friend" Released: October 23, 2025; 2. "Your Favorite Toy" Released: February 19, 2026; 3. "Caught in the Echo" Released: March 20, 2026; 4. "Of All People" Released: April 10, 2026

Your Favorite Toy is the twelfth studio album by American rock band Foo Fighters, released on April 24, 2026 on Roswell Records and RCA Records. Produced by the band itself and Oliver Roman, it is the band's first studio album to feature drummer Ilan Rubin and follows the group's 2023 album But Here We Are. It is the band's first album since Sonic Highways (2014) to not be produced by Greg Kurstin, who produced the band's three previous albums.

The album was announced on February 19, 2026 alongside the release of its title track, which was described by frontman Dave Grohl as the song that set the overall direction and tone of the record following an extended period of experimentation.

== Background ==
Your Favorite Toy was recorded at Dave Grohl's home studio, with further recording done at the band's Studio 606 facility in Los Angeles. It was co-produced by the band and engineer Oliver Roman, making this record the first not to be co-produced by Greg Kurstin since Sonic Highways in 2014. The record follows But Here We Are (2023), which was created in the aftermath of drummer Taylor Hawkins' death and featured Dave Grohl performing the drum parts himself.

During 2024 and 2025 the band worked on new material, eventually shaping a set of louder, more energetic songs after the creation of the title track. Grohl had demoed over fifty songs, with initial influences including Massive Attack, Pink Floyd and Bad Brains, amongst others: "One night, I was lying in bed, listening to [all the demos] and, randomly, there were ten in a row on the playlist that were really reminiscent of the music we grew up listening to. I thought, 'Oh my God, this is the energy'."

The album marks the first Foo Fighters studio album with drummer Ilan Rubin, who joined the group after touring line-up changes following Hawkins' death. Grohl and Rubin recorded the rhythm tracks live, without a click track, which the other members then overdubbed their parts onto.

The album and title track were originally titled For Good, after the same chorus lyric – "someone threw away your favorite toy for good" – but Grohl changed it after the announcement of the movie Wicked: For Good to avoid similarities.

== Music and composition ==
Early reports describe the album as a return to a high-energy rock sound, with uptempo songs reminiscent of the band's earlier work while continuing the melodic alternative rock style established across their discography.

== Release and promotion ==
Several short extracts of tracks from the album were released in early February 2026 to the band's social media pages as teasers. The band's website was updated on February 12 with several longer snippets. The title track, "Your Favorite Toy", premiered on February 19, 2026. The band announced a world tour beginning in mid-2026 in support of the album.

During the album's release week on April 29, the band announced two secret club shows in the New York City area: at Irving Plaza on April 30 and Starland Ballroom on May 2, with respective capacities of 1,200 and 2,500 people.

== Reception ==
Professional ratings
Aggregate scores
Source	Rating
Metacritic	74/100
Review scores
Source	Rating
AllMusic	4/5 stars
The Arts Desk	3/5 stars
Clash	8/10
Classic Rock	4.5/5 stars
Consequence	B
The Independent	4/5 stars
Kerrang!	4/5
Mojo	4/5 stars
musicOMH	3.5/5 stars
Rolling Stone	4/5 stars

According to the review aggregator Metacritic, Your Favorite Toy received "generally favorable reviews" based on a weighted average score of 74 out of 100 from 21 critic scores. Pitchfork opined that "Dave Grohl faces the backlash with the leanest, meanest Foo Fighters album in 30 years", adding that "Fueled by an uncaged-animal energy and caked in speaker-crackling distortion, Your Favorite Toy has Grohl reassuming a position he occupied 30-odd years ago, mugging for the fisheye lens and screaming himself hoarse". Meanwhile, Rolling Stone stated that "The long-running rock band's 12th album is some of the most powerful music it's made". In the same spirit, Classic Rock wrote, "There's a real sense of rejuvenation and rebirth to the record, whichever twists it takes." NME even compared it to their early albums, stating, "Your Favorite Toy is a few more tracks of that depth away from being the most vital Foo Fighters record since 1997's The Colour and the Shape".

Some reviewers were not as impressed with the album. Media outlets such as The A.V. Club have criticized the fact that "The music is never offensively bad, but it's far from convincingly inspired". PopMatters were similarly critical: "Nobody's expecting Leonard Cohen-esque parables from the man, nor should they. Taking all of that to one side, the words on 'Amen, Caveman' are dire; a collection of badly-expressed babble more becoming of an adolescent rather than a Grammy-winning artist."

== Track listing ==
All tracks are written by Foo Fighters.

Your Favorite Toy track listing
No.	Title	Length
1.	"Caught in the Echo"	4:02
2.	"Of All People"	2:34
3.	"Window"	3:37
4.	"Your Favorite Toy"	2:56
5.	"If You Only Knew"	4:00
6.	"Spit Shine"	3:21
7.	"Unconditional"	4:16
8.	"Child Actor"	3:45
9.	"Amen, Caveman"	3:16
10.	"Asking for a Friend"	4:29
Total length:		36:26

== Personnel ==
Credits adapted from Your Favorite Toy liner notes, except where noted.

Foo Fighters

- Dave Grohl – guitar, vocals
- Pat Smear – guitar
- Chris Shiflett – guitar
- Nate Mendel – bass guitar
- Rami Jaffee – piano, keyboards, theremin on "Spit Shine"
- Ilan Rubin – drums

Additional musician

- Harper Grohl – backing vocals on "Your Favorite Toy"

Production

- Foo Fighters – production
- Oliver Roman – production, engineering
- Mark "Spike" Stent – mixing
- Randy Merrill – mastering
- Bob Demaa – mastering assistant
- Morning Breath Inc. – art direction and design

== Charts ==
Chart performance for Your Favorite Toy
Chart (2026)	Peak position
Australian Albums (ARIA)	3
Austrian Albums (Ö3 Austria)	3
Belgian Albums (Ultratop Flanders)	7
Belgian Albums (Ultratop Wallonia)	3
Canadian Albums (Billboard)	55
Dutch Albums (Album Top 100)	13
Finnish Albums (Suomen virallinen lista)	10
French Albums (SNEP)	22
French Rock & Metal Albums (SNEP)	1
German Albums (Offizielle Top 100)	2
German Rock & Metal Albums (Offizielle Top 100)	1
Greek Albums (IFPI)	30
Hungarian Physical Albums (MAHASZ)	27
Irish Albums (Official Charts)	25
Italian Albums (FIMI)	18
Japanese Albums (Oricon)	24
Japanese Combined Albums (Oricon)	47
Japanese Download Albums (Billboard Japan)	16
Japanese Rock Albums (Oricon)	6
Japanese Top Albums Sales (Billboard Japan)	37
New Zealand Albums (RMNZ)	4
Norwegian Albums (IFPI Norge)	33
Norwegian Rock Albums (IFPI Norge)	2
Polish Albums (ZPAV)	30
Portuguese Albums (AFP)	18
Scottish Albums (Official Charts)	2
Spanish Albums (Promusicae)	19
Swedish Albums (Sverigetopplistan)	12
Swedish Hard Rock Albums (Sverigetopplistan)	2
Swiss Albums (Schweizer Hitparade)	2
UK Albums (Official Charts)	2
UK Rock & Metal Albums (Official Charts)	1
US Billboard 200	23
US Top Rock & Alternative Albums (Billboard)	3
