= Rescued =

Single by Foo Fighters

from the album But Here We Are
- Released: April 19, 2023
- Recorded: 2022–2023
- Genre: Power pop
- Length: 4:18
- Label: Roswell; RCA
- Songwriters: Dave Grohl; Rami Jaffee; Nate Mendel; Chris Shiflett; Pat Smear
- Producers: Foo Fighters; Greg Kurstin

Foo Fighters singles chronology
"Love Dies Young" (2021)	"Rescued" (2023)	"Under You" (2023)

"Rescued" is a song by American rock band Foo Fighters. Released on April 19, 2023, it is the first single by the band since the death of longtime drummer, Taylor Hawkins, and the first from their eleventh studio album, But Here We Are.

== Release ==
Upon its release as the first single from But Here We Are, the band described it as "the first of 10 songs that run the emotional gamut from rage and sorrow to serenity and acceptance, and myriad points in between".

== Reception ==
Consequence of Sound stated in a review of the song that "If anything Foo Fighters have never sounded more vital. As they launch into the song's blistering post-chorus, there is an intoxicating power in the band's open-hearted delivery – the same one that has characterized the band's biggest hits, like "Best of You", "The Pretender", and "Everlong". Metal Planet Music stated that "'Rescued' is a full-blooded rocker that contains a fiery defiance, shot through with pain and fragility. Bringing together all we love about Foo Fighters, the guitars rampage, the rhythms drive and Dave Grohl brings one of his most emotional vocals to the lyrics."

"Rescued" gave the band their 29th top-ten hit on Billboard's Alternative Airplay chart setting a record for the most top-tens on that chart. On May 27, 2023, "Rescued" became the band's eleventh number 1 on Billboard's Alternative Airplay chart, making Foo Fighters the band with the fourth most number 1's on the chart behind Red Hot Chili Peppers, Green Day, and Linkin Park. "Rescued" was also the band's tenth number 1 on Billboard's Rock & Alternative Airplay chart and twelfth number 1 on Billboard's Mainstream Rock Airplay chart with 9.9 million audience impressions. This made Foo Fighters the band with most number 1's on the Rock & Alternative Airplay chart and fifth most number 1's on the Mainstream Rock Airplay chart. "Rescued" entered the UK Singles midweek chart update at number 96 on June 5, 2023.

== Charts ==
=== Weekly charts ===
Weekly chart performance for "Rescued"
Chart (2023)	Peak position
Australia Digital Tracks (ARIA)	36
Canada Hot 100 (Billboard)	88
Canada Rock (Billboard)	1
Czech Republic Modern Rock (IFPI)	9
Finland Airplay (Suomen virallinen lista)	98
German Download Singles (Official German Charts)	79
Japan Hot Overseas (Billboard)	13
New Zealand Hot Singles (RMNZ)	16
UK Singles Sales (OCC)	48
UK Singles Downloads (Official Charts)	28
US Hot Rock & Alternative Songs (Billboard)	12
US Rock & Alternative Airplay (Billboard)	1

=== Year-end charts ===
Year-end chart performance for "Rescued"
Chart (2023)	Position
US Hot Rock & Alternative Songs (Billboard)	65
US Rock Airplay (Billboard)	2
