= Under You =

Single by Foo Fighters

from the album But Here We Are
- Released: May 17, 2023
- Genre: Melodic punk; power pop
- Length: 3:39
- Label: Roswell; RCA
- Songwriters: Dave Grohl; Rami Jaffee; Nate Mendel; Chris Shiflett; Pat Smear
- Producers: Foo Fighters; Greg Kurstin

Foo Fighters singles chronology
"Rescued" (2023)	"Under You" (2023)	"Show Me How" (2023)

"Under You" is a song by American rock band Foo Fighters, released as the second single from their eleventh studio album, But Here We Are, in May 2023.

== Composition and reception ==
"Under You" has been described as melodic punk, and power pop by critics.

According to Rolling Stone, "Under You" was recorded in the wake of Foo Fighters' drummer Taylor Hawkins' death and although it has the "sunny power-pop adjacent feel" of earlier Foo Fighters tracks like "Learn to Fly", the lyrics depict Foo Fighters' frontman Dave Grohl being nearly suffocated by the pain of losing someone. The song was ranked number 100 in Rolling Stone's The 100 Best Songs of 2023.

== Chart performance ==
In August 2023, "Under You" became Foo Fighters' sixteenth top ten hit on the Billboard Rock & Alternative Airplay chart, which broke the record for the band with most top-ten songs on that chart. Over the following month, airplay on US rock radio continued to climb until it concurrently sat on top of the Rock & Alternative Airplay, Alternative Airplay, and Mainstream Rock charts. As a result, it became the eleventh song by the band to top the Rock & Alternative Airplay chart, as they became the band with the most number ones in the charts history.

== Charts ==
=== Weekly charts ===
Weekly chart performance for "Under You"
Chart (2023)	Peak position
Canada Rock (Billboard)	1
Japan Hot Overseas (Billboard Japan)	13
New Zealand Hot Singles (RMNZ)	18
UK Singles (Official Charts)	98
UK Rock & Metal (Official Charts)	6
US Hot Rock & Alternative Songs (Billboard)	37
US Rock & Alternative Airplay (Billboard)	1

=== Year-end charts ===
2023 year-end chart performance for "Under You"
Chart (2023)	Position
US Rock Airplay (Billboard)	10

2024 year-end chart performance for "Under You"
Chart (2024)	Position
US Rock Airplay (Billboard)	7
