= Children of Bodom discography =

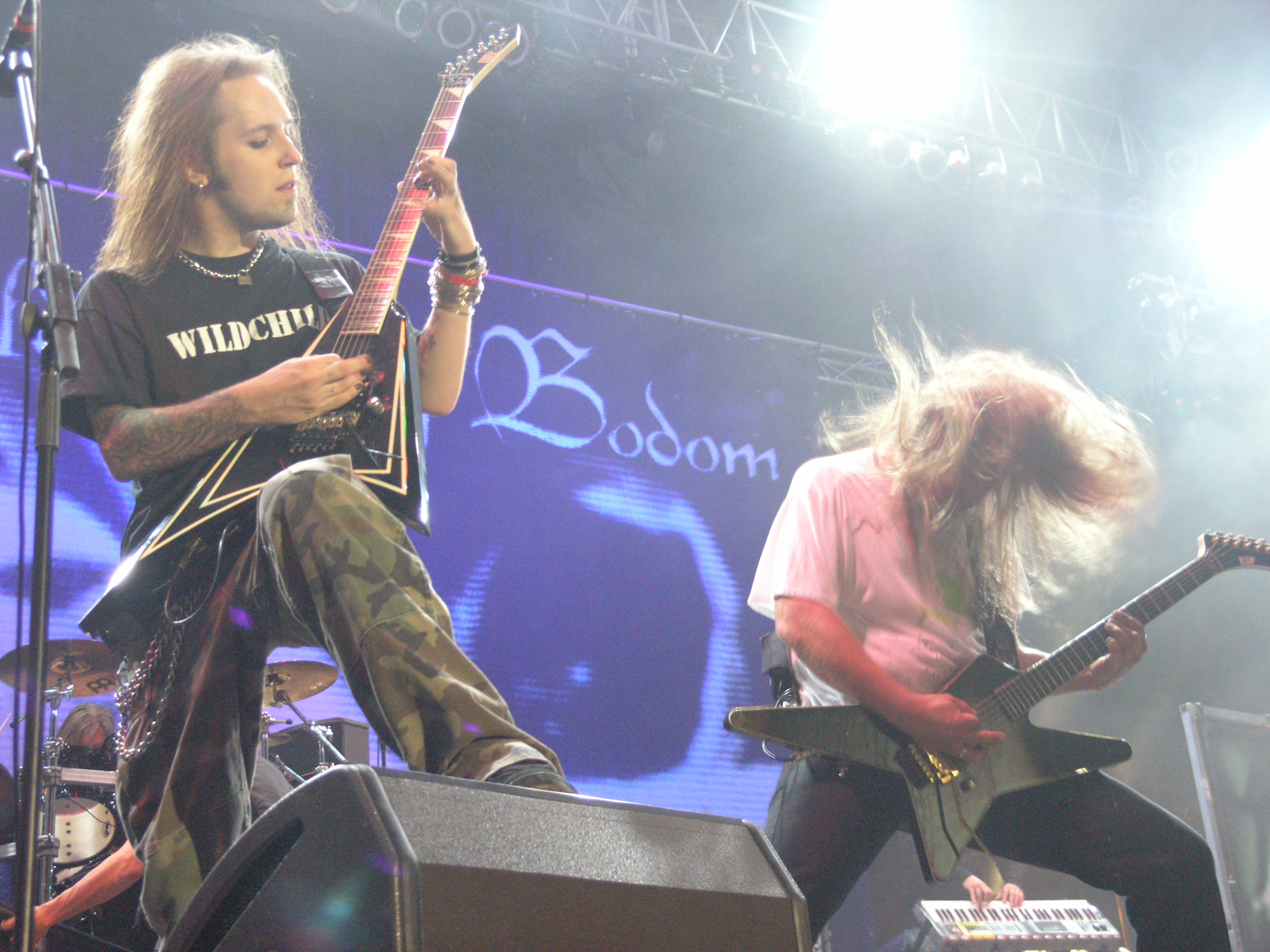
- Alexi Laiho and Roope Latvala performing with Children of Bodom at Masters of Rock in 2007
- Studio albums: 10
- Extended plays: 2
- Live albums: 3
- Compilation albums: 2
- Tribute albums: 1
- Singles: 16
- Video albums: 1
- Music videos: 20

The discography of Children of Bodom, a five-piece melodic death metal band from Espoo, Finland. Throughout their career, the band has been known to incorporate many different musical styles, leading critics and fans to label them as everything from melodic death metal and black metal to thrash metal, progressive metal and even power metal. The band's final line-up before they officially disbanded in 2019 included the founders Alexi Laiho (lead vocals, lead guitar) and Jaska Raatikainen (drums) along with Henkka Seppälä (bass guitar), Janne Wirman (keyboards) and Daniel Freyberg (rhythm guitar). Children of Bodom have released ten studio albums, two live albums, one compilation album, seven singles, two EPs and two split singles. Moreover, in the period 1994–1996 they released three demos under their old moniker, IneartheD. This list includes the material released as IneartheD.

Children of Bodom's first release under their new name was the split single "Children of Bodom", released in January 1997. Their debut album Something Wild followed later the same year. 1999 saw the release of two Children of Bodom albums: their second studio album, Hatebreeder, and their first live album, titled Tokyo Warhearts. In 2001 they released their third studio album, Follow the Reaper, which included the successful single "Hate Me!". Follow the Reaper was the first Children of Bodom album to go gold in their home country of Finland.

After renewing their contract with Spinefarm Records, thereby gaining the support of the major recording company Universal Music Group, the band recorded their fourth studio album Hate Crew Deathroll, which was released in 2003 to considerable commercial success. Hate Crew Deathroll was the first Children of Bodom album to 'simplify' their heavy metal in order to have a broader appeal: the guitars used more heavy riffs than their earlier releases, it had emphasis on a clear musical structure and the instrumental virtuosity had been significantly reduced.

Rhythm guitarist Alexander Kuoppala left the band during the tours following Hate Crew Deathroll, and was replaced with Roope Latvala of Stone fame. On their fifth studio album, released in 2005 as Are You Dead Yet?, the band continued to explore the traits exhibited on Hate Crew Deathroll. The album received mixed reviews, with some critics praising the new sound, while others criticised it for being too "simple". Blooddrunk, was released in April 2008. The album Relentless Reckless Forever was released in March 2011 while they were on The Ugly World Tour 2011.

Their album Halo of Blood was released in 2013. I Worship Chaos followed in 2015 and the final album Hexed was released in 2019.

As of 2009, Children of Bodom have sold over two million records worldwide, including over 200,000 in Finland and over 500,000 in the United States.

== Albums ==
=== Studio albums ===
Title	Album details	Peak chart positions												Sales	Certifications
Title	Album details	FIN	AUS	AUT	CAN	FRA	GER	HUN	JPN	SWE	SWI	UK	US	Sales	Certifications
Something Wild	Released: 16 November 1997; Label: Spinefarm; Format: CD, LP, MC	20	—	—	—	—	—	—	—	—	—	—	—	FIN: 22,692	IFPI FIN: Gold
Hatebreeder	Released: 26 April 1999; Label: Spinefarm; Format: CD, LP, MC	6	—	—	—	—	76	—	83	—	—	—	—	FIN: 31,737	IFPI FIN: Platinum
Follow the Reaper	Released: 30 October 2000; Label: Spinefarm; Format: CD, LP, MC	3	—	38	—	88	46	—	67	—	—	—	—	FIN: 29,014; US: 7,946	IFPI FIN: Platinum
Hate Crew Deathroll	Released: 6 January 2003; Label: Spinefarm; Format: CD, LP	1	—	—	—	74	45	30	29	36	—	—	—	FIN: 24,716	IFPI FIN: Gold
Are You Dead Yet?	Released: 14 September 2005; Label: Spinefarm; Format: CD, LP, MC	1	—	42	—	67	16	—	17	16	79	—	195	FIN: 24,253; US: 5,000	IFPI FIN: Gold
Blooddrunk	Released: 9 April 2008; Label: Spinefarm; Format: CD, LP	1	48	19	7	161	10	—	12	28	50	44	22	FIN: 23,247; US: 19,000	IFPI FIN: Gold
Relentless Reckless Forever	Released: 8 March 2011; Label: Spinefarm; Format: CD, LP	1	47	29	21	104	20	—	20	47	43	71	42	FIN: 13,894; US: 11,000	IFPI FIN: Gold
Halo of Blood	Released: 11 June 2013; Label: Nuclear Blast; Format: CD, LP	2	—	28	20	109	18	10	16	26	24	103	54	US: 8,400	
I Worship Chaos	Released: 2 October 2015; Label: Nuclear Blast; Format: CD, LP	1	69	36	21	74	20	31	—	—	26	—	92		
Hexed	Released: 8 March 2019; Label: Nuclear Blast; Format: CD, LP	1	—	15	87	94	9	33	28	—	14	—	—	JPN: 2,395	

=== Live albums ===
Title	Album details	Peak chart positions	
Title	Album details	FIN	GER
Tokyo Warhearts	Released: 11 October 1999; Label: Spinefarm; Format: CD, LP, MC	13	—
Chaos Ridden Years	Released: 11 October 2006; Label: Spinefarm; Format: CD	28	75
A Chapter Called Children of Bodom – The Final Show in Helsinki Ice Hall 2019	Released: 15 December 2023; Label: Spinefarm; Format: CD, vinyl, digital	1	98
"—" denotes a release that did not chart.

=== Compilation albums ===
Title	Album details	Peak chart positions		Sales
Title	Album details	FIN	JPN	Sales
Bestbreeder from 1997 to 2000	Released: August 2003; Label: Toy's Factory; Format: CD	—	84	
Holiday at Lake Bodom (15 Years of Wasted Youth)	Released: 22 May 2012; Label: Spinefarm; Format: CD, LP	12	67	US: 600
"—" denotes a release that did not chart.

=== Cover albums ===
Title	Album details	Peak chart positions					Sales
Title	Album details	FIN	AUT	GER	JPN	US	Sales
Skeletons in the Closet	Released: 22 September 2009; Label: Spinefarm; Format: CD	9	63	78	67	81	US: 5,600

=== Video albums ===
Title	Album details	Peak chart positions				Certifications
Title	Album details	FIN	HUN	JPN	SWE	Certifications
Chaos Ridden Years: Stockholm Knockout Live	Released: 16 October 2006; Label: Spinefarm; Format: DVD	1	3	37	3	IFPI FIN: Platinum; MC: Platinum

=== Demos ===
Title	Demo details	Notes	Track listing
Implosion of Heaven	Released: 12 December 1994; Label: Self-released; Formats: CS	released as IneartheD	1. "Chaos" – 4:30; 2. "Shards of Truth" – 6:31; 3. "Implosion of Heaven" – 3:56; 4. "Tss, Aah!!" – 0:41
Ubiquitous Absence of Remission	Released: 1995; Label: Self-released, Wild Rags Records (1996 reissue); Formats: CS	released as IneartheD	1. "Intro" – 1:35; 2. "Translucent Image" (feat. Niina Keitel) – 4:03; 3. "Possessed" – 5:01; 4. "Shamed" – 5:05
Shining	Released: 14 February 1996; Label: Self-released; Formats: CS	released as IneartheD	1. "Talking of the Trees (Sanctuary)" – 5:19; 2. "Vision of Eternal Sorrow" – 5:02; 3. "Homeland" – 4:42; 4. "Homeland II: Shining (The 4th Kingdom)" – 3:00

== EPs ==
Title	Album details	Peak chart positions	Sales	Certifications
Title	Album details	FIN	Sales	Certifications
Trashed, Lost & Strungout	Released: 6 October 2004; Label: Spinefarm; Format: CD, DVD	1^{[a]}	FIN: 5,083	IFPI FIN: Gold^{[b]}
Hellhounds on My Trail	Released: 9 June 2008; Label: Spinefarm; Format: CD, 12"	8^{[c]}		

Notes

a. Extended version of single under the same title. Despite being released as a CD/DVD, Trashed, Lost & Strungout charted on the Finnish Singles Chart.
b. Applies to DVD edition of EP.
c. Released only in the United Kingdom and Finland. Despite being released as an EP, Hellhounds on My Trail charted on the Finnish Singles Chart.

== Singles ==
=== Commercial and promo singles ===
Title	Year	Peak chart positions				Sales	Certifications	Album
Title	Year	FIN	GER	HUN	UK	Sales	Certifications	Album
"Children of Bodom" (with Cryhavoc and Wizzard)	1998	1	—	—	—	FIN: 5,503	IFPI FIN: Gold	Hatebreeder
"Downfall"	1998	1	—	—	—	FIN: 6,235	IFPI FIN: Gold	Hatebreeder
"Hate Me!"	2000	1	—	—	—	FIN: 10,741	IFPI FIN: Platinum	Follow the Reaper
"You're Better Off Dead!"	2002	1	—	—	—	FIN: 7,322	IFPI FIN: Gold	Hate Crew Deathroll
"Needled 24/7"	2003	—	—	—	—			Hate Crew Deathroll
"Trashed, Lost & Strungout"	2004	1	89	1	—	FIN: 7,509	IFPI FIN: Gold	Are You Dead Yet?
"In Your Face"	2005	1	—	8	144	FIN: 6,788	IFPI FIN: Gold	Are You Dead Yet?
"Blooddrunk"	2008	1	—	—	78			Blooddrunk
"Hellhounds on My Trail"	2008	—	—	—	—			Blooddrunk
"Smile Pretty for the Devil"	2008	—	—	—	—			Blooddrunk
"Lookin' Out My Back Door"	2009	—	—	—	—			Skeletons in the Closet
"Was It Worth It?"	2011	6	—	—	—			Relentless Reckless Forever
"Roundtrip to Hell and Back"	2011	—	—	—	—			Relentless Reckless Forever
"Transference"	2013	—	—	—	—			Halo of Blood
"Halo of Blood"	2013	—	—	—	—			Halo of Blood
"Your Days Are Numbered"	2013	—	—	—	—			Halo of Blood
"I Worship Chaos"	2015	—	—	—	—			I Worship Chaos
"Morrigan"	2015	—	—	—	—			I Worship Chaos
"—" denotes a release that did not chart.

=== DVD singles ===
Title	Year	Peak chart positions	Album
Title	Year	FIN	Album
"In Your Face"	2005	5	Are You Dead Yet?

== Music videos ==
Year	Music video	Director
1998	"Deadnight Warrior"	Mika Lindberg
1999	"Downfall"	Mika Lindberg
2000	"Everytime I Die"	Tuukka Temonen
2003	"Needled 24/7"	Pasi Takula
2003	"Sixpounder"	Mika Lindberg
2004	"Trashed, Lost and Strungout"	Patric Ullaeus
2005	"In Your Face"	Sandra Marschner
2006	"Are You Dead Yet?"	Ralf Strathmann
2008	"Blooddrunk"	Sandra Marschner
2008	"Hellhounds on My Trail"	Sandra Marschner
2008	"Smile Pretty for the Devil"	Sandra Marschner
2009	"Lookin' Out My Back Door"	—
2011	"Was It Worth It?"	Dale "Rage" Resteghini
2011	"Roundtrip to Hell and Back"	—
2012	"Shovel Knockout"	Jussi Hyttinen
2013	"Transference"	Dariusz Szermanowicz
2015	"Morrigan"	Patric Ullaeus
2018	"Under Glass and Clover"	Yka Jarvinen
2019	"Platitudes and Barren Words"	Yka Jarvinen
2019	"Hexed"	Lucas Cappy & James McIntosh

== See also ==
- List of best-selling music artists in Finland
