= Holiday at Lake Bodom (15 Years of Wasted Youth) =

Compilation album by Children of Bodom
- Released: 22 May 2012
- Recorded: 1997–2011
- Genre: Melodic death metal; power metal
- Length: 78:40

Children of Bodom chronology
Relentless Reckless Forever (2011)	Holiday at Lake Bodom (15 Years of Wasted Youth) (2012)	Halo of Blood (2013)

Holiday at Lake Bodom (15 Years of Wasted Youth) is the third compilation album by Finnish melodic death metal band Children of Bodom, featuring one song from Something Wild, three from Hatebreeder, three from Follow the Reaper, four from Hate Crew Deathroll, four from Are You Dead Yet?, one from Blooddrunk, two from Relentless Reckless Forever, and two previously unreleased cover songs. The DVD portion of the package includes "candid touring and backstage footage from around the world", plus the music video for "Shovel Knockout". The album was released on 22 May 2012.

== Track listing ==
No.	Title	Length
1.	"Hate Crew Deathroll (Hate Crew Deathroll)"	3:38
2.	"Shovel Knockout (Relentless Reckless Forever)"	4:03
3.	"Hate Me! (Follow the Reaper)"	4:44
4.	"Everytime I Die (Follow the Reaper)"	4:03
5.	"Needled 24/7 (Hate Crew Deathroll)"	4:08
6.	"I'm Shipping Up to Boston (new recording)" (Dropkick Murphys cover)	2:50
7.	"Sixpounder (Hate Crew Deathroll)"	3:24
8.	"Warheart (Hatebreeder)"	4:06
9.	"Roundtrip to Hell and Back (Relentless Reckless Forever)"	3:47
10.	"Trashed, Lost & Strungout (Are You Dead Yet?)"	4:01
11.	"Living Dead Beat (Are You Dead Yet?)"	4:56
12.	"Deadnight Warrior (Something Wild)"	3:21
13.	"Blooddrunk (Bloodrunk)"	4:06
14.	"Follow the Reaper (Follow the Reaper)"	3:47
15.	"Are You Dead Yet? (Are You Dead Yet?)"	3:54
16.	"Silent Night, Bodom Night (Hatebreeder)"	3:11
17.	"Jessie's Girl (new recording)" (featuring Pasi Rantanen; Rick Springfield cover)	2:58
18.	"In Your Face (Are You Dead Yet?)"	4:16
19.	"Angels Don't Kill (Hate Crew Deathroll)"	5:13
20.	"Downfall (Hatebreeder)"	4:33

== Credits ==
=== Band members ===
- Alexi Laiho – lead vocals, lead guitar
- Roope Latvala – rhythm guitar and backing vocals on tracks 2, 6, 9, 10, 11, 13, 15, 17 and 18
- Jaska Raatikainen – drums
- Henkka Seppälä – bass, backing vocals
- Janne Wirman – keyboards, synthesizer
- Alexander Kuoppala – rhythm guitar and backing vocals on tracks 1, 3, 4, 5, 7, 8, 12, 14, 16, 19 and 20

=== Guest musicians ===
- Pasi Rantanen – lead vocals on track 17

== Charts ==
Chart (2012)	Peak position
Belgium Albums Chart	197
Finnish Albums Chart	12
Japanese Albums Chart	67
