= Hexed (album) =

2019 album by Finnish band Children of Bodom

Studio album by Children of Bodom
- Released: 8 March 2019
- Recorded: March–May 2018
- Studios: Danger Johnny Studios (Helsinki, Finland); Beyond Abilities Studios (keyboards)
- Genres: Melodic death metal; power metal
- Length: 46:55
- Label: Nuclear Blast
- Producer: Mikko Karmila

Children of Bodom chronology
I Worship Chaos (2015)	Hexed (2019)	Paint the Sky with Blood (as Bodom After Midnight) (2021)

Singles from Hexed
- 1. "Under Grass and Clover" Released: 7 December 2018; 2. "This Road" Released: 1 February 2019; 3. "Platitudes and Barren Words" Released: 1 March 2019; 4. "Hecate's Nightmare" Released: 8 March 2019

Professional ratings
Review scores
Source	Rating
AllMusic	3.5/5 stars
Exclaim!	6/10

Hexed is the tenth and final studio album by Finnish melodic death metal band Children of Bodom. It was released on 8 March 2019.

It is the only album to feature guitarist Daniel Freyberg, who became a member of the band in 2016, the last album to feature longtime members Jaska Raatikainen, Henkka Seppälä, and Janne Wirman, who all quit the band in November 2019, and the last Children of Bodom album to be recorded and released by Alexi Laiho before his death in late 2020. It is also the last recording to use the Children of Bodom name, as the departing members (Raatikainen, Seppälä and Wirman) filed for the rights to the name, making it so Laiho must be granted permission from all three to continue using the name. Laiho and Freyberg would continue with a different lineup under the name Bodom After Midnight, until Laiho's death.

Hexed is the second album (after Relentless Reckless Forever) not to have a song with "Bodom" in the title, and the band's first album since Follow the Reaper to include neo-classical elements. Most of the songs are tuned in Drop B tuning, while the songs "This Road" and "Glass Houses" are tuned to D tuning.

== Track listing ==
All tracks are written by Alexi Laiho.

No.	Title	Length
1.	"This Road"	4:33
2.	"Under Grass and Clover"	3:33
3.	"Glass Houses"	3:27
4.	"Hecate's Nightmare"	4:09
5.	"Kick in a Spleen"	3:34
6.	"Platitudes and Barren Words"	4:13
7.	"Hexed"	5:03
8.	"Relapse (The Nature of My Crime)"	3:26
9.	"Say Never Look Back"	4:23
10.	"Soon Departed"	4:54
11.	"Knuckleduster" (Re-recorded from Trashed, Lost & Strungout EP)	3:27
Total length:		46:55

Bonus tracks
No.	Title	Length
12.	"I Worship Chaos" (live)	3:35
13.	"Morrigan" (live)	4:58
14.	"Knuckleduster" (remix)	5:30
Total length:		58:45

== Personnel ==
Children of Bodom

- Alexi Laiho – lead guitar, lead vocals
- Daniel Freyberg – rhythm guitar, backing vocals
- Henkka Seppälä – bass, backing vocals
- Janne Wirman – keyboards
- Jaska Raatikainen – drums, backing vocals

Production

- Mikko Karmila – production, engineering, mixing
- Denis Forkas – cover art

== Charts ==
Chart (2019)	Peak position
Austrian Albums (Ö3 Austria)	15
Belgian Albums (Ultratop Flanders)	115
Belgian Albums (Ultratop Wallonia)	81
Canadian Albums (Billboard)	87
Finnish Albums (Suomen virallinen lista)	1
French Albums (SNEP)	94
German Albums (Offizielle Top 100)	9
Hungarian Albums (MAHASZ)	33
Japanese Albums (Oricon)	28
Scottish Albums (Official Charts)	40
Spanish Albums (PROMUSICAE)	98
Swiss Albums (Schweizer Hitparade)	14
