= I Worship Chaos =

Studio album by Children of Bodom
- Released: 2 October 2015
- Recorded: 2015
- Studio: Danger Johnny Studios, Helsinki, Finland
- Genre: Melodic death metal
- Length: 44:26
- Label: Nuclear Blast
- Producer: Peter Tägtgren; Mikko Karmila

Children of Bodom chronology
Halo of Blood (2013)	I Worship Chaos (2015)	Hexed (2019)

Professional ratings
Review scores
Source	Rating
About	3.5/5 stars
AllMusic	4/5 stars
Blabbermouth.net	6/10
MetalSucks	3.5/5 stars

I Worship Chaos is the ninth studio album by Finnish melodic death metal band Children of Bodom. It was released on 2 October 2015. It is the first album since 2005's Are You Dead Yet not to feature guitarist Roope Latvala due to his firing from the band in May 2015, making this the band's first album as a four-piece group with Alexi Laiho handling all guitar duties.

For the first time, the band did not use a commercial recording studio. Instead they opted to use a converted warehouse to enhance the ambiance of the sound.

In this album, the band used drop B tuning on most of the album and D-flat tuning on the songs "Hold Your Tongue" and "Suicide Bomber" instead of drop C tuning and D standard used on previous albums. This also makes this the first album since Something Wild to use D-flat tuning.

== Track listing ==
All tracks are written by Alexi Laiho.

No.	Title	Length
1.	"I Hurt"	4:29
2.	"My Bodom (I Am the Only One)"	4:19
3.	"Morrigan"	5:07
4.	"Horns"	3:25
5.	"Prayer for the Afflicted"	4:55
6.	"I Worship Chaos"	3:40
7.	"Hold Your Tongue"	4:02
8.	"Suicide Bomber"	3:34
9.	"All for Nothing"	5:43
10.	"Widdershins"	5:12
Total length:		44:26

Japanese edition bonus track
No.	Title	Lyrics	Length
11.	"Cruel Summer" (Bananarama cover)	Sara Dallin; Siobhan Fahey; Keren Woodward; Anthony Swain; Steve Jolley	3:05
Total length:			47:31

Deluxe edition bonus track
No.	Title	Lyrics	Length
11.	"Mistress of Taboo" (Plasmatics cover)	Richie Stotts; Rod Swenson	3:38
12.	"Danger Zone" (Kenny Loggins cover)	Giorgio Moroder; Tom Whitlock	2:58
13.	"Black Winter Day" (Amorphis cover)	traditional	3:42
Total length:			54:44

== Personnel ==
Children of Bodom

- Alexi Laiho – guitars, lead vocals
- Jaska Raatikainen – drums
- Henkka Seppälä – bass
- Janne Wirman – keyboards, backing vocals

Production

- Mikko Karmila – producer, engineering, mixing
- Tuomas Korpi – cover art

Guest performers

- Wednesday 13 – vocals on 'Mistress of Taboo'
- Kim Dylla – vocals on 'Mistress of Taboo'

== Charts ==
Chart (2015)	Peak position
Australian Albums (ARIA)	69
Austrian Albums (Ö3 Austria)	36
Belgian Albums (Ultratop Flanders)	101
Belgian Albums (Ultratop Wallonia)	49
Canadian Albums (Billboard)	21
Finnish Albums (Suomen virallinen lista)	1
French Albums (SNEP)	74
German Albums (Offizielle Top 100)	20
Hungarian Albums (MAHASZ)	31
Swiss Albums (Schweizer Hitparade)	26
US Billboard 200	92
US Independent Albums (Billboard)	11
US Top Album Sales (Billboard)	48
US Top Hard Rock Albums (Billboard)	11
US Top Rock Albums (Billboard)	21
