= Hate Me! =

2000 single by Children of Bodom

Single by Children of Bodom

from the album Follow the Reaper
- Released: May 2000
- Recorded: Late 1999
- Genre: Melodic death metal, power metal
- Length: 4:47
- Label: Spinefarm
- Songwriter(s): Alexi Laiho

"Hate Me!" is a song by Finnish melodic death metal band Children of Bodom, the song is released as the demo version of a song from their third album from Follow the Reaper. The single managed to sell platinum. There was also a Yellow 7" single released by Nuclear Blast with the same track listing. An acoustic version was played during the end of the Chaos Ridden Years documentary by Alexi Laiho with Finnish lyrics. The demo version is slightly different from the album version from Follow the Reaper.

== Track listing ==
No.	Title	Length
1.	"Hate Me!"	4:47
2.	"Hellion" (W.A.S.P. Cover)	3:00
