= Chaos Ridden Years =

Live album / DVD by Children of Bodom
- Released: 11 October 2006
- Recorded: 5 February 2006
- Venue: Arenan, Stockholm, Sweden
- Length: 1:34:31 (live album); 1:35:23 (live DVD)
- Label: Spinefarm
- Director: Patric Ullaeus
- Producer: Alexi Laiho

Children of Bodom chronology
Are You Dead Yet? (2005)	Chaos Ridden Years (2006)	Blooddrunk (2008)

DVD cover

Professional ratings
Review scores
Source	Rating
AllMusic	4/5 stars

Chaos Ridden Years is the second live album by Finnish melodic death metal band Children of Bodom. The release was released on Spinefarm Records both as a live album titled Chaos Ridden Years in October 2006, and the DVD version titled Stockholm Knockout Live - Chaos Ridden Years on 11 October 2006, directed by Patric Ullaeus.

== General information ==
The album is a live show from Arenan, Stockholm, Sweden and contains a documentary of the band, the making of the album, deleted scenes, a photo gallery, and seven promotional videos.

Laiho said in an interview with the Finnish music magazine Soundi that he did not want to record the DVD in Finland, because it was going to be an international release, and it would be ridiculous making speeches between the songs in English in the band's homeland Finland.

== Track listing ==
=== CD & DVD ===
- Note: The track times listed are exclusive to the live album.

Disc 1:

No.	Title	Length
1.	"Living Dead Beat"	4:51
2.	"Sixpounder"	4:36
3.	"Silent Night, Bodom Night"	3:40
4.	"Hate Me!"	5:36
5.	"We're Not Gonna Fall"	3:54
6.	"Angels Don't Kill"	5:15
7.	"Deadbeats I" (drum solo)	4:46
8.	"Bodom After Midnight / Bodom Beach Terror" (medley)	8:38
9.	"Follow the Reaper"	5:28

Disc 2:

No.	Title	Length
1.	"Needled 24/7"	4:27
2.	"Clash of the Booze Brothers" (guitar/keyboard duel)	7:35
3.	"In Your Face"	5:32
4.	"Hate Crew Deathroll"	6:02
5.	"Are You Dead Yet?"	4:40
6.	"Latvala - Guitar Solo"	1:21
7.	"Lake Bodom"	4:38
8.	"Everytime I Die"	5:23
9.	"Downfall"	7:14

=== DVD only media ===
- Chaos Ridden Years: The Children of Bodom Documentary
- Making of Stockholm Knockout Live
- Deleted Scenes
- Photo Gallery
- Promotional Videos:
  - "Are You Dead Yet?"
  - "Downfall"
  - "Deadnight Warrior"
  - "Everytime I Die"
  - "In Your Face"
  - "Sixpounder"
  - "Trashed, Lost & Strungout"

== Release history ==
Country	Date	Version
Finland	11 October 2006	Live album, DVD
Japan	11 October 2006	Live album, DVD
Europe	16 October 2006	Live album, DVD
United States	24 October 2006	Live album, DVD

== Charts ==
Chart (2006)	Peak position
Finnish Albums (Suomen virallinen lista)	1
