= Downfall (Children of Bodom song) =

Single by Children of Bodom

from the album Hatebreeder
- Released: 1998/1999
- Genre: Melodic death metal, power metal
- Length: 4:33
- Label: Spinefarm, Nuclear Blast
- Songwriter: Alexi Laiho
- Producers: Anssi Kippo and Children of Bodom

"Downfall" is a single taken from the studio album Hatebreeder by Finnish melodic death metal band Children of Bodom. The song, originally called "Forevermore", was written by the lead vocalist Alexi Laiho. The video of "Downfall" was directed by Mika Lindberg. Side B contains the cover track "No Commands" by fellow Finnish band Stone.

The single spent a total of 11 weeks on the Finnish charts, two of which were at number 1.

It was usually the last song played live at Children of Bodom shows. The band sometimes used an extended intro by keyboardist Janne Wirman in which Laiho and guitarist Roope Latvala played the riffs of famous metal songs (such as Dio's Holy Diver and Judas Priest's Breaking the Law) after which they began playing the song's main riff.

Chart performance for "Downfall"
Chart (1999)	Peak position
Finland (Suomen virallinen lista)	1

== Track listing ==
No.	Title	Length
1.	"Downfall"	4:33
2.	"No Commands" (Stone cover)	4:47
