= Paint the Sky with Blood =

2021 EP by Bodom After Midnight

EP by Bodom After Midnight
- Released: 23 April 2021
- Recorded: November 2020
- Studio: Finnvox, iStudio (Helsinki, Finland)
- Genre: Melodic death metal
- Length: 14:53
- Label: Napalm, Ward
- Producer: Joonas Parkkonen

Bodom After Midnight chronology
Hexed (as Children of Bodom) (2019)	Paint the Sky with Blood (2021)

Professional ratings
Review scores
Source	Rating
Blabbermouth.net	7.5/10
Kerrang!	4/5
Metal Hammer	4/5 stars

Paint the Sky with Blood is the only EP by Finnish melodic death metal band Bodom After Midnight, the short-lived follow-up project to Children of Bodom, released on 23 April 2021 through Napalm Records.

The EP consists of three songs recorded in November 2020 before frontman Alexi Laiho's death the following month, when the band was about to enter the process of writing and recording material for the follow-up, the debut full-length album originally set for late 2021 release. In February 2021, it was announced the EP would be released as planned. As no more songs were written and the remaining members decided to not continue without Laiho, this is the sole release by the band. The music video for the title song "Paint the Sky with Blood", which was filmed 10 days before Laiho's death, was released on 30 March 2021.

The EP was released as CD, 10" vinyl and digital download. A total of eight different vinyl versions were available, most of which are limited editions. The Japanese CD edition, released through Ward Records, includes a bonus DVD featuring the music video of "Paint the Sky with Blood".

== Reception ==
The EP received generally favorable reviews from critics.

Dom Lawson of Metal Hammer gave the EP 4 out of 5 stars, praising the energy and intensity of the songwriting and performances, as well as the production that adds "grandiloquent sonic swell" topping previous efforts in Laiho's catalogue. Similarly, Metal Storm praised the input of Toivonen and Väyrynen in its review, concluding Bodom After Midnight has "more weight behind its rhythm section" than Children of Bodom, "replacing some of that frenzied lawlessness with coordination, balance, and a full-bodied sound."

Nick Terry of Decibel magazine compared the material to Laiho's earlier work with Children of Bodom, judging the EP to be "neither a disgrace nor a high point" of his career, noting that "[Children of Bodom] fans will surely appreciate [the songs] as the bonus that they are."

== Track listing ==
Paint the Sky with Blood track listing
No.	Title	Writer(s)	Length
1.	"Paint the Sky with Blood"	Alexi Laiho	4:26
2.	"Payback's a Bitch"	Alexi Laiho	4:06
3.	"Where Dead Angels Lie" (Dissection cover)	Jon Nödtveidt	6:21
Total length:			14:53

Japanese edition bonus DVD
No.	Title	Length
1.	"Paint the Sky with Blood" (music video)	4:39

== Personnel ==
Bodom After Midnight

- Alexi Laiho – vocals, guitar
- Daniel Freyberg – guitar
- Mitja Toivonen – bass
- Waltteri Väyrynen – drums

Additional musicians

- Vili Itäpelto – keyboards

Production

- Joonas Parkkonen – producer, engineering
- Mikko Karmila – mixing
- Mika Jussila – mastering
- Travis Smith – artwork

== Charts ==
Chart performance for Paint the Sky with Blood
Chart (2021)	Peak position
Finland (Suomen virallinen lista)	13
Japanese Albums (Oricon)	39
