= Tokyo Warhearts =

Live album by Children of Bodom
- Released: 11 October 1999
- Recorded: 10–11 July 1999
- Venue: Club Citta in Tokyo
- Genres: Melodic death metal; extreme metal; neoclassical metal
- Length: 44:44
- Label: Spinefarm

Children of Bodom chronology
Hatebreeder (1999)	Tokyo Warhearts (1999)	Follow the Reaper (2000)

Tokyo Warhearts is the first live album by Finnish melodic death metal band Children of Bodom, recorded in 1999. It was recorded and filmed at Club Citta on 10 and 11 July 1999 in Tokyo. The album was re-released on 29 May 2001. The band and their record label, Spinefarm Records, had plans to release the show as a DVD along with the CD, but they reached the conclusion that there were some mismatches between the video and the audio, as there was video footage from two different shows.

Two of the songs from this album have been released separately for promotional purposes and can be found on a Spinefarm DVD compilation: Silent Night, Bodom Night and Deadnight Warrior.

Track 1 covers a segment of Jan Hammer's "Crockett's Theme" from the Miami Vice soundtrack. At the end of track 6, a brief part of the riff of "Crazy Nights" by Japanese band Loudness is played. They later covered the song and released it as a bonus track on the album Halo of Blood. The intro for track 9 is a strain of music called "Hummel Gets the Rockets" which was composed by Hans Zimmer and Nick Glennie-Smith for the 1996 film The Rock.

== Track listing ==
No.	Title	Length
1.	"Intro"	1:25
2.	"Silent Night, Bodom Night"	3:23
3.	"Lake Bodom"	4:08
4.	"Warheart"	4:07
5.	"Bed of Razors"	4:35
6.	"War of Razors" (guitar/keyboard duel)	2:10
7.	"Deadnight Warrior"	3:32
8.	"Hatebreeder"	4:30
9.	"Touch Like Angel of Death"	5:53
10.	"Downfall"	4:47
11.	"Towards Dead End"	6:10

== Charts ==
Chart performance for Tokyo Warhearts
Chart (2021)	Peak position
Finnish Albums (Suomen virallinen lista)	13
