= Relentless Reckless Forever =

Studio album by Children of Bodom
- Released: 8 March 2011
- Recorded: August – September 2010
- Studios: Petrax Studio; Hydeaway Studio; Beyond Abilities Studios (keyboards)
- Genres: Melodic death metal, power metal, thrash metal
- Length: 36:19
- Labels: Spinefarm, Fearless, Nuclear Blast
- Producers: Matt Hyde, Children of Bodom

Children of Bodom chronology
Skeletons in the Closet (2009)	Relentless Reckless Forever (2011)	Holiday at Lake Bodom (15 Years of Wasted Youth) (2012)

Professional ratings
Review scores
Source	Rating
AllMusic	3.5/5 stars
BW&BK	8/10 stars
Metal.de	7/10
Metal Hammer	8/10 stars
Revolver	5/5 stars
Rock Sound	7/10 stars
Sputnikmusic	2.5/5

Relentless Reckless Forever is the seventh studio album by Finnish melodic death metal band Children of Bodom, released on 8 March 2011 through Spinefarm Records, Fearless Records and Nuclear Blast. It is the first Children of Bodom album to not have a song with "Bodom" in the title.

== Background ==
Relentless Reckless Forever was recorded at Finland's Petrax Studios, during August and September 2010. "We worked super hard on this album, at least for me it was pretty much no sleep or rest for six weeks," stated vocalist/guitarist Alexi Laiho. "But we were determined to make the best COB album ever, so we were willing to do whatever it took. Of course, having our producer Matt Hyde kicking our asses 24/7 definitely made the results even better, so obviously we're more than anxious to get this album out there."

The song "Ugly" starts with a quote from the television show House, taken from episode 12 of season 6 titled "Remorse". The quote is, "You're feeling something, what is it, what do you feel? I don't know, it hurts. It will."

A music video has been shot for the single "Was It Worth It?" with skateboarder Chris Cole as well as noted pro skaters Jamie Thomas, Garrett Hill and Tom Asta.

"The single 'Was It Worth It?' is a total party song," said Laiho. "It's not your typical Bodom sound, but it's one of my favorites and heavy as hell." The video was shot in Pennsylvania's residential Action Sports compound Camp Woodward and it was directed by Dale Resteghini for Raging Nation Films.

Regarding the subject matter covered in the "Pussyfoot Miss Suicide" lyrics, Laiho told Revolver, "I've been involved with stupid chicks who were trying to get attention by being, 'Oh, I'm so fucking depressed. I'm gonna slit my wrists with a cheese grater...' And it's so fucking boring, like, 'Just let it go. You're really not gonna do it, anyway.' It's kind of harsh, but it's fuckin' black humor." "Ugly", on the other hand, is "really just venting and screaming stupid stuff. Nobody should expect anything deep and poetic and sensitive and intelligent, y'know?"

The single "Was It Worth It?" was made available for streaming on 13 January via Facebook, and "Ugly" was broadcast for the first time on 4 February 2011 on FullMetalJackie's radio show.

The album is available in several editions: CD, CD+DVD Limited Digipak, Vinyl LP and limited Super Deluxe Edition including a CD, DVD and a 64-page photobook. The Japanese editions are pressed in SHM-CD format, feature three bonus tracks, include lyrics translation in Japanese and a poster is offered with the first press edition.

Relentless Reckless Forever was certified gold (sold over 10,000 copies) in Finland on the first day of its release, 9 March. As of 10 March, the album had sold over 100,000 copies worldwide.

== Track listing ==
All tracks are written by Alexi Laiho, except "Party All the Time", written and composed by Rick James

No.	Title	Length
1.	"Not My Funeral"	4:55
2.	"Shovel Knockout"	4:03
3.	"Roundtrip to Hell and Back"	3:48
4.	"Pussyfoot Miss Suicide"	4:10
5.	"Relentless Reckless Forever"	4:42
6.	"Ugly"	4:13
7.	"Cry of the Nihilist"	3:31
8.	"Was It Worth It?"	4:06
9.	"Northpole Throwdown"	2:55

iTunes US & Canada bonus tracks
No.	Title	Length
10.	"Angels Don't Kill" (Live at Bloodstock)	5:43
11.	"Everytime I Die" (Live at Bloodstock)	5:11

Japanese deluxe edition bonus track
No.	Title	Length
12.	"Party All the Time" (Eddie Murphy cover)	3:00

The DVD coming with some editions fulfils:

- "Was It Worth It?" [Music Video]
- Making of "Was It Worth It?"
- "Angels Don't Kill" – Live at Bloodstock
- "Everytime I Die" – Live at Bloodstock
- The Rockhouse Method With Alexi Laiho – DVD Trailer
- The Rockhouse Method With Alexi Laiho – Instructional DVD Excerpt

== Chart performance ==
Chart	Peak position	Source
Austrian Albums Chart	29	
Finnish Albums Chart	1	
German Albums Chart	20	
Japan Albums Chart	20	
Swedish National Chart	47	
Swiss Albums Chart	43	
Official UK Charts	71	
US Billboard 200	42	

== Personnel ==
Children of Bodom

- Alexi Laiho – lead guitar, lead vocals
- Roope Latvala – rhythm guitar, 1st solo in "Not My Funeral", 2st solo in "Was It Worth It", backing vocals
- Henkka Seppälä – bass, backing vocals
- Janne Wirman – keyboards
- Jaska Raatikainen – drums

Additional performers

- James-Paul Luna (ex-White Wizzard) – clean vocals on "Party All the Time"
- DJ Kreisipastori – additional keyboard programming on "Party All the Time"

Production

- Produced by Matt Hyde and Children of Bodom
- Arranged by Children of Bodom
- Recorded by Matt Hyde and Chris Rakestraw, except keyboards, recorded by Janne Wirman
- Mastered by Tom Baker at Precision Mastering, USA, October 2010

== Release history ==
Region	Date
Japan	2 March 2011
Austria Germany (Republic of Ireland) Ireland Norway Poland Switzerland	4 March 2011
Asia (excl Japan) France Hungary New Zealand Sweden (United Kingdom) UK	7 March 2011
Canada Spain (United States) US	8 March 2011
Finland	9 March 2011
Australia	11 March 2011
