= Halo of Blood =

Studio album by Children of Bodom
- Released: 29 May 2013 (Japan)
- Recorded: December 2012 – February 2013
- Studio: Danger Johnny Studios, Helsinki, Finland; Petrax Studios, Hollola, Finland; Beyond Abilities Studios (keyboards)
- Genre: Melodic death metal
- Length: 41:40
- Label: Nuclear Blast, Marquee Inc.
- Producer: Peter Tägtgren; Mikko Karmila; Janne Wirman

Children of Bodom chronology
Holiday at Lake Bodom (15 Years of Wasted Youth) (2012)	Halo of Blood (2013)	I Worship Chaos (2015)

Singles from Halo of Blood
- 1. "Transference" Released: 24 April 2013; 2. "Halo of Blood" Released: 20 May 2013

Halo of Blood is the eighth studio album by Finnish melodic death metal band Children of Bodom. It was released on 7 June 2013 in Europe and 11 June in North America on Nuclear Blast Records. In Japan, the album was released by Marquee Inc. on 29 May 2013. This would be the last album with guitarist Roope Latvala before he was leaving the band in May 2015.

== Production ==
Drummer Jaska Raatikainen posted on Facebook that the band has accumulated a number of songs for a new album. Raatikainen described the new material as dark and "also little [sic] 'black' [metal]-ish." In an interview before the band's first show in India, keyboardist Janne Wirman revealed that the band currently had four songs written, with plans to enter the studio at the end of 2012. Wirman predicted a release around April or May 2013. In mid November 2012, it was announced that the band had started recording demos of new material.

In January 2013, it was revealed that frontman/guitarist Alexi Laiho was finishing writing lyrics, and that recording would commence in February. Two song titles were also revealed. On 19 March 2013, the album's title was announced as Halo of Blood, and a track listing and cover artwork were revealed.

Some resources mention Swede Peter Tägtgren as the album's producer. However, according to Children of Bodom's Janne Wirman, "Peter was there just to produce the vocals" and the album was actually produced by Mikko Karmila and himself.

== Cover art ==
The album cover depicts the reaper standing on the frozen surface of Lake Bodom, with dead bodies trapped beneath the ice.

== Critical reception ==
The album received mostly positive reviews, with an aggregated score of 66/100 on Metacritic, indicating favorable reviews. It was considered a return to form for the band, garnering a warmer reception from fans than their previous three albums.

Professional ratings
Aggregate scores
Source	Rating
Metacritic	66/100
Review scores
Source	Rating
About	3.5/5 stars
AllMusic	3.5/5 stars
Kerrang	8/10 stars
Loudwire	4/5 stars
New Noise Magazine	3/5 stars
PopMatters	7/10 stars
Revolver	2.5/5 stars

== Track listing ==
All tracks are written by Alexi Laiho.

No.	Title	Length
1.	"Waste of Skin"	4:16
2.	"Halo of Blood"	3:12
3.	"Scream for Silence"	4:09
4.	"Transference"	3:58
5.	"Bodom Blue Moon (The Second Coming)"	4:14
6.	"Your Days Are Numbered"	3:40
7.	"Dead Man's Hand on You"	4:58
8.	"Damaged Beyond Repair"	4:20
9.	"All Twisted"	4:51
10.	"One Bottle and a Knee Deep"	4:02
Total length:		41:40

Limited edition bonus track
No.	Title	Length
11.	"Sleeping in My Car" (Roxette cover)	3:19
Total length:		44:59

Japanese edition bonus tracks
No.	Title	Length
11.	"Crazy Nights" (Loudness cover)	4:25
12.	"Sleeping in My Car" (Roxette cover)	3:19
Total length:		49:24

== Personnel ==
Children of Bodom

- Alexi Laiho – lead guitar, lead vocals
- Roope Latvala – rhythm guitar, backing vocals
- Henkka Seppälä – bass, backing vocals
- Janne Wirman – keyboards
- Jaska Raatikainen – drums, backing vocals

Production

- Peter Tägtgren – vocal production
- Mikko Karmila – production, engineering, mixing
- Mika Jussila – mastering
- Sami Saramäki – cover art

== Charts ==
Chart (2013)	Peak position
Austrian Albums Chart	28
Finnish Albums Chart	2
French Albums Chart	109
German Albums Chart	18
Japanese Albums Chart	16
Hungarian Albums Chart	10
Swedish Albums Chart	26
Swiss Albums Chart	24
US Billboard 200	54
US Hard Rock Albums	7
