= Are You Dead Yet? =

2005 album by Children of Bodom

Studio album by Children of Bodom
- Released: 14 September 2005
- Recorded: May 2004 (track 8); April–May 2005
- Studio: Finnvox; Hästfittan Studios; Astia-Studios (track 8)
- Genre: Melodic death metal; power metal
- Length: 37:23
- Label: Spinefarm, Century Media
- Producer: Mikko Karmila, Anssi Kippo (Trashed, Lost & Strungout)

Children of Bodom chronology
Bestbreeder from 1997 to 2000 (2003)	Are You Dead Yet? (2005)	Chaos Ridden Years (2006)

Are You Dead Yet? is the fifth studio album by Finnish melodic death metal band Children of Bodom. It was released in Finland on 14 September 2005 and internationally on 25 October 2005 under the Century Media label. It is the first Children of Bodom album to feature guitarist Roope Latvala (Stone, Sinergy, ex-Waltari), due to the departure of their original rhythm guitarist Alexander Kuoppala.

== Background ==
Are You Dead Yet? is the second Children of Bodom album to have two singles from it. "Trashed, Lost & Strungout" was released as an EP and single in 2004, and "In Your Face" was released in August 2005 shortly before the album. It was also their first album with three music videos, with their third video being the title track.

"If You Want Peace... Prepare for War" is the English translation of the Latin phrase Si vis pacem, para bellum. The song "Are You Dead Yet?" is a downloadable song in the music video game Rock Band 2, and it can also be played in some of the other Rock Band games.

The title track's video was shot in part at the Tavastia club in Helsinki, Finland on 13 February 2006. Additional footage for the video was filmed in the US. The clip received its premiere in the US on MTV's Headbangers Ball on 18 March 2006 wherein the band made a special appearance. The video, directed by Ralf Strathmann, involves a rather controversial intimate make out scene involving actors who were minors at the time.

=== Name ===
The name of the album and its title track was conceived by Alexi Laiho after an alcohol-related injury. He alludes to this during the band's concert DVD, Chaos Ridden Years, and in a magazine article, says: "I came up with the new album title last winter when we were back home and I went out for a night of drinking. I got a hold of some of the cheapest vodka and just drank and drank and drank, and one thing led to another, so we were outside having fun, and I climbed on top of a car, and slipped and fell off, and next thing I know I was in hospital. I had three broken bones in my wrist and lots of stitches, got kept in over night. So when I woke up the next morning I obviously wasn't feeling too good. I looked in the mirror and said to myself, 'Have you had enough? Are you dead yet?'"

== Reception ==
Professional ratings
Review scores
Source	Rating
AllMusic	3.5/5 stars
Rock Hard	9/10
Sputnikmusic	3.5/5 stars
Terrorizer	4/10
Blabbermouth	7.5/10 stars
Metal Storm	5/10 stars
TrueMetal	80/100

In 2005, Are You Dead Yet? was ranked number 485 in Rock Hard magazine's book of The 500 Greatest Rock & Metal Albums of All Time. However, it was criticized by Paul Stenning in Terrorizer as "interminably weak" and destructive of the band's "remaining credibility".

== Track listing ==
All lyrics are written by Alexi Laiho, except where noted; all music is composed by Laiho, except where noted.

No.	Title	Lyrics	Music	Length
1.	"Living Dead Beat"			5:19
2.	"Are You Dead Yet?"			3:54
3.	"If You Want Peace… Prepare for War"			3:57
4.	"Punch Me I Bleed"			4:51
5.	"In Your Face"			4:16
6.	"Next in Line"	Laiho; Kimberly Goss		4:19
7.	"Bastards of Bodom"	Goss	Laiho; Roope Latvala	3:29
8.	"Trashed, Lost & Strungout"			4:01
9.	"We're Not Gonna Fall"			3:18

Japan bonus tracks
No.	Title	Length
10.	"Oops!... I Did It Again" (Britney Spears cover) (feat. Jonna Kosonen)	3:20
11.	"Talk Dirty to Me" (Poison cover)	3:40

North America bonus tracks
No.	Title	Length
10.	"Somebody Put Something in My Drink" (Ramones cover)	3:20

United Kingdom bonus tracks
No.	Title	Length
10.	"Rebel Yell" (Billy Idol cover)	4:13

== Personnel ==
Children Of Bodom

- Alexi Laiho – lead guitar, lead vocals
- Roope Latvala – rhythm guitar, solos on "If You Want Peace... Prepare For War", backing vocals
- Henkka Seppälä – bass, backing vocals
- Janne Wirman – keyboards
- Jaska Raatikainen – drums

Additional musicians

- Alexander Kuoppala – rhythm guitar on "Somebody Put Something in My Drink"
- Jonna Kosonen – female vocals on "Oops!...... I Did It Again"

Production

- Produced, recorded, and mixed by Mikko Karmila, except "Trashed, Lost & Strungout", produced and recorded by Anssi Kippo and mixed by Karmila
- Mastered by Mika "Count" Jussila
- Cover artwork by Sami Saramäki
- Band photographs by Toni Härkönen

== Charts ==
Chart (2005)	Peak position
Austrian Albums (Ö3 Austria)	42
Finnish Albums (Suomen virallinen lista)	1
French Albums (SNEP)	67
German Albums (Offizielle Top 100)	16
Italian Albums (FIMI)	80
Japanese Albums (Oricon)	17
Swedish Albums (Sverigetopplistan)	16
Swiss Albums (Schweizer Hitparade)	79
US Billboard 200	195

== Certifications and sales ==
Region	Certification	Certified units/sales
Finland (Musiikkituottajat)	Gold	24,253
