= Trashed, Lost & Strungout =

EP by Children of Bodom
- Released: 6 October 2004
- Recorded: Astia-Studios in Lappeenranta, Finland, 21 March – 2 April 2004
- Genres: Melodic death metal, power metal
- Length: 14:54
- Labels: Spinefarm, Century Media
- Producer: Anssi Kippo

Children of Bodom chronology
Hate Crew Deathroll (2003)	Trashed, Lost & Strungout (2004)	Are You Dead Yet? (2005)

Professional ratings
Review scores
Source	Rating
AllMusic	2.5/5 stars

Trashed, Lost & Strungout is a single and an EP released by the Finnish melodic death metal band Children of Bodom on Spinefarm Records. It was released on 25 October 2004. Unlike most EPs, it was released on CD and DVD. The CD includes 3 other songs and the DVD includes the single and 9 other songs. This track also appeared on Children of Bodom's album Are You Dead Yet?.

== Track listing ==
Single

No.	Title	Length
1.	"Trashed, Lost & Strungout"	4:03
2.	"She Is Beautiful" (Andrew W.K. Cover)	3:26

EP - CD

No.	Title	Length
1.	"Trashed, Lost & Strungout"	4:02
2.	"Knuckleduster"	3:29
3.	"Bed of Nails" (Alice Cooper cover)	3:56
4.	"She Is Beautiful" (Andrew W.K. cover)	3:26
5.	"Trashed, Lost & Strungout" (Video)	4:00
6.	"Trashed And Lost In Helsinki - Children of Bodom's Night Out" (Video)	19:26

EP - DVD

No.	Title	Length
1.	"Trashed, Lost & Strungout" (Video / 5.1 & Stereo)	4:00
2.	"Knuckleduster" (Audio / 5.1 & Stereo)	3:28
3.	"Bed of Nails" (Audio / Stereo - Alice Cooper cover)	3:53
4.	"She Is Beautiful" (Audio / Stereo - Andrew W.K. cover)	3:24
5.	"Andrew W.K. Greets Children of Bodom" (Video Footage from Japan / Stereo)	3:33
6.	"Angels Don't Kill (Remix)" (Audio / 5.1 & Stereo)	5:12
7.	"Trashed and Lost in Helsinki" (Video Footage of COB's Night Out / Stereo)	19:15
8.	"Sixpounder" (Video / 5.1 & Stereo)	3:34
9.	"Downfall" (live at Tuska Video 2003 / 5.1 & Stereo)	5:44
10.	"Everytime I Die" (live at Tuska Video 2003 / 5.1 & Stereo)	4:36

== Personnel ==
Children of Bodom

- Alexi Laiho – lead guitar, vocals
- Roope Latvala – rhythm guitar
- Henkka Seppälä – bass
- Janne Wirman – keyboards
- Jaska Raatikainen – drums

Production

- Anssi Kippo – production, recording
- Mikko Karmila – mixing
- Mika "Count" Jussila – mastering
- Sasu Siikamäki – graphic design
- Patric Ullaeus – band photo

== Chart positions ==
Chart (2004–2005)	Peak position
Finland (Suomen virallinen lista)	1
Germany (GfK)	89
