= Hatebreeder =

Studio album by Children of Bodom
- Released: 4 May 1999
- Recorded: December 1998 – January 1999
- Studio: Astia-Studios
- Genre: Melodic death metal; power metal
- Length: 38:10
- Label: Spinefarm, Nuclear Blast
- Producer: Anssi Kippo

Children of Bodom chronology
Something Wild (1997)	Hatebreeder (1999)	Tokyo Warhearts (1999)

Singles from Hatebreeder
- 1. "Children of Bodom" Released: 1998; 2. "Downfall" Released: 1998

Professional ratings
Review scores
Source	Rating
AllMusic	3.5/5 stars
Sputnikmusic	4.5/5 stars
Rock Hard	8/10

Hatebreeder is the second studio album by Finnish melodic death metal band Children of Bodom, released in 1999. The deluxe edition was released in 2005 with bonus material. It was also re-released in 2008.

== Reception ==
In 2005, Hatebreeder was ranked number 492 in Rock Hard magazine's book The 500 Greatest Rock & Metal Albums of All Time.

== Track listing ==
All tracks are written by Alexi Laiho, except where noted.

No.	Title	Length
1.	"Warheart"	4:07
2.	"Silent Night, Bodom Night" (lyrics: Kimberly Goss)	3:12
3.	"Hatebreeder"	4:20
4.	"Bed of Razors" (music: Laiho, Alexander Kuoppala)	3:56
5.	"Towards Dead End"	4:53
6.	"Black Widow"	3:58
7.	"Wrath Within"	3:53
8.	"Children of Bodom"	5:13
9.	"Downfall"	4:33
Total length:		38:10

Deluxe edition
No.	Title	Length
10.	"No Commands" (Stone cover, can be found on various CD versions; lyrics and music: Janne Joutsenniemi, Roope Latvala)	4:44
11.	"Aces High" (Iron Maiden cover, only on Deluxe Edition; lyrics and music: Steve Harris)	4:28
Total length:		47:22

== Personnel ==
Children of Bodom

- Alexi Laiho – lead guitar, vocals
- Alexander Kuoppala – rhythm guitar
- Henkka Seppälä – bass
- Janne Wirman – keyboards
- Jaska Raatikainen – drums
- Gang vocals on "Warheart", "Black Widow", and "Children of Bodom" by Children of Bodom

Additional performer

- Kimberly Goss – screams

Production

- Produced and recorded by Anssi Kippo
- Mixed by Mikko Karmila
- Mastered by Mika Jussila
- Artwork by Graham French
- Design and layout by Apurator

== Charts ==
Chart (1999)	Peak position
Finnish Albums (Suomen virallinen lista)	6
German Albums (Offizielle Top 100)	76
