= Children of Bodom =

Finnish melodic death metal band

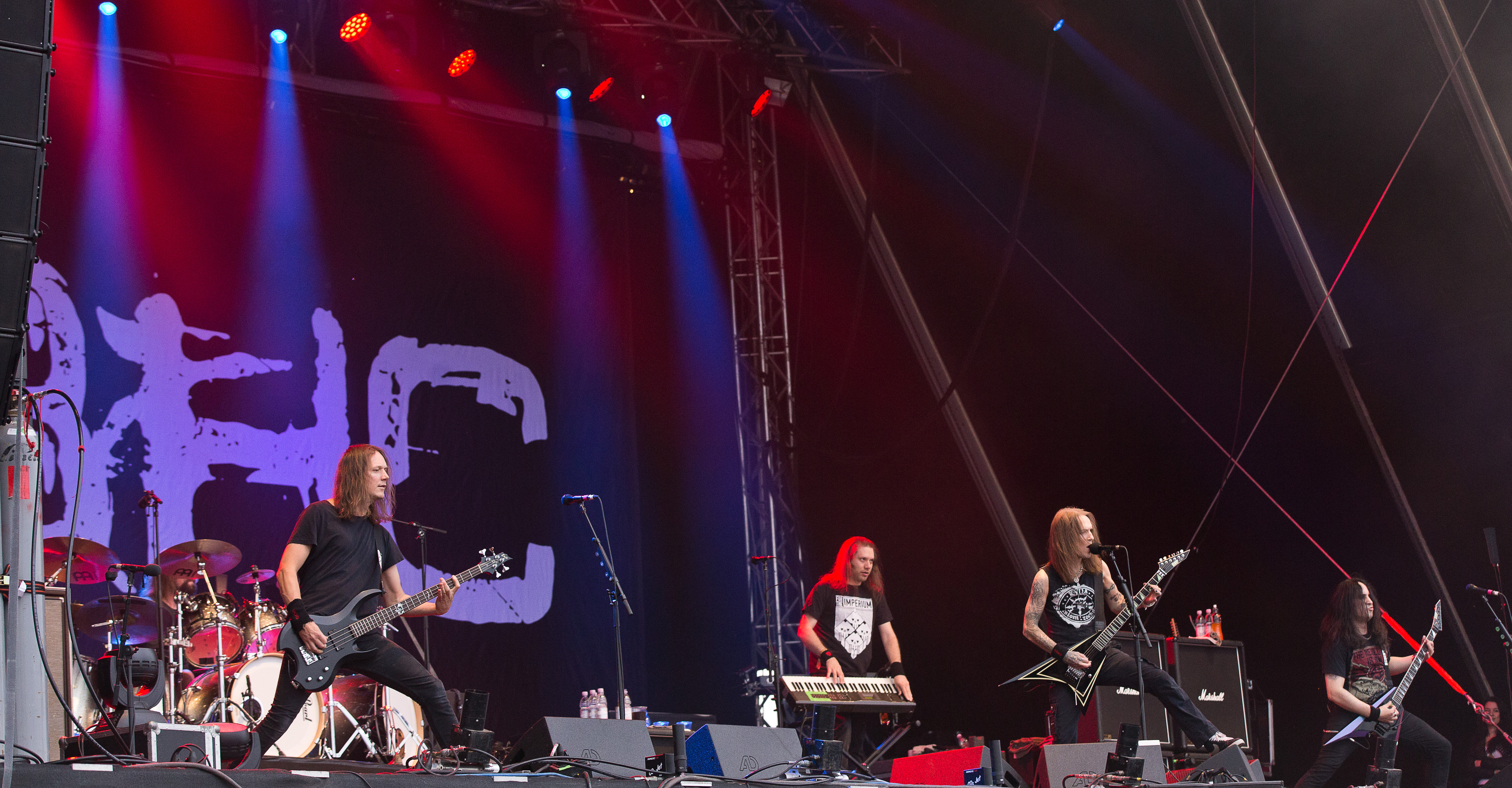
- Children of Bodom performing live in 2016

Background information
- Also known as: Inearthed (1993–1997)
- Origin: Espoo, Uusimaa, Finland
- Genres: Melodic death metal; power metal
- Works: Discography
- Years active: 1993–2019; 2025–present
- Labels: Nuclear Blast; Spinefarm; Century Media
- Spinoffs: Bodom After Midnight, Warmen
- Members: Jaska Raatikainen; Henkka T. Blacksmith; Janne Wirman; Alexander Kuoppala; Samy Elbanna
- Past members: Alexi Laiho; Samuli Miettinen; Jani Pirisjoki; Roope Latvala; Daniel Freyberg
- Website: cobhc.com

Children of Bodom are a Finnish melodic death metal band from Espoo, Uusimaa. Formed in 1993 as Inearthed, the final line-up of the group upon their split in 2019 consisted of frontman Alexi Laiho, drummer Jaska Raatikainen, bassist Henkka Seppälä, keyboardist Janne Wirman and guitarist Daniel Freyberg. The band released ten studio albums, three live albums, two EPs, two compilation albums, and one DVD.

The band's third studio album, Follow the Reaper (2000), was their first to receive a gold certification in Finland. Subsequent studio albums acquired the same status. Their next four albums each debuted at number one on the Finnish album charts, and have charted on the United States Billboard 200. They are one of Finland's best selling artists of all time with more than 250,000 records sold there alone.

In 2019, Children of Bodom held their last concert in Helsinki, named A Chapter Called Children of Bodom, before disbanding. Laiho and Freyberg carried on as Bodom After Midnight in 2020. Founding member and main songwriter Laiho died in December of that year.

In October 2025, the surviving members of Children of Bodom announced that the band would reunite to perform two tribute shows for Laiho in February 2026, with Samy Elbanna filling in for him on vocals and guitar. The band announced a permanent reunion on 10 March 2026, including plans to celebrate the 30th anniversary of their debut album, Something Wild in 2027.

== History ==
=== Formation and early years (1993–1996) ===
Guitarist Alexi "Wildchild" Laiho and drummer Jaska Raatikainen formed Children of Bodom in 1993 as Inearthed. They had known each other since childhood and shared an interest in heavy metal, especially death metal. Bassist Samuli Miettinen completed the initial line-up of the band. Inearthed recorded its first demo, Implosion of Heaven, during August of the same year.

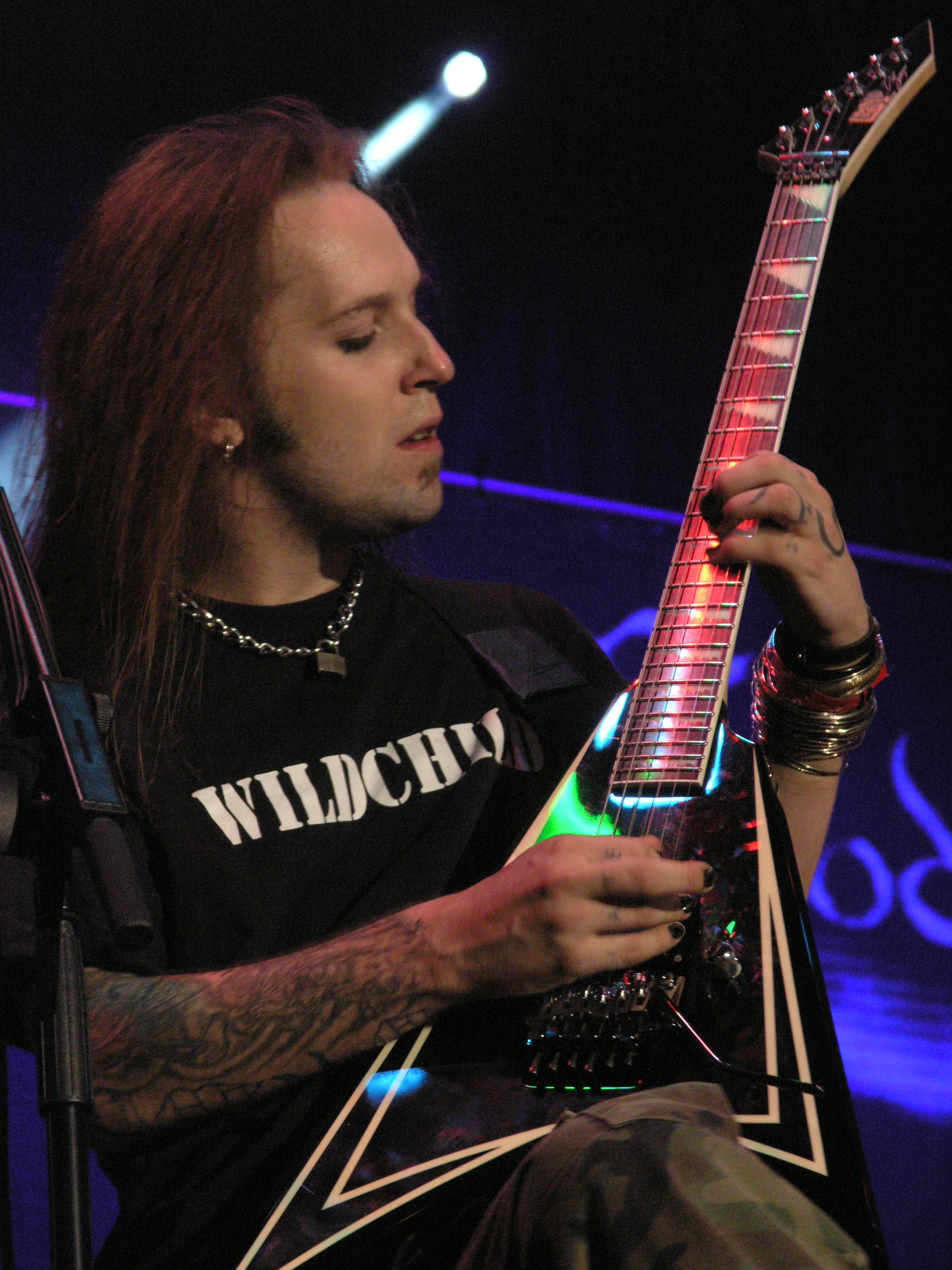
Lead guitarist and singer Alexi Laiho in 2007

Miettinen was the band's main lyrical composer for the two years that he took part in Inearthed, but his family moved to the United States in 1995, making it impossible for him to remain in the band. His last contributions to Inearthed were the lyrics of the songs from their second demo, Ubiquitous Absence of Remission. This demo was the first time they worked with producer Anssi Kippo at Astia-studios (Lappeenranta, Finland). On this demo, keyboards were incorporated into the band's songs for the first time. To achieve this, Laiho and Raatikainen played the keyboards separately and subsequently mixed the recorded track with the other instruments. Laiho, who had previously only composed the melodies of the songs, assumed the role of the band's lyricist.

At the time, Raatikainen played French horn in a local big band. During a rehearsal, he met Alexander Kuoppala, a trumpet player and guitarist. Kuoppala was invited to join Inearthed as a rhythm guitarist before the demo recording, but did not participate in the recording itself, as he was on vacation at the time. In early 1996, Henkka "Blacksmith" Seppälä, whom Laiho and Raatikainen knew from school, replaced Miettinen on bass as well as contributing backing vocals. The band recruited keyboardist Jani Pirisjoki.

With this line-up, Inearthed recorded their third demo, Shining. This demo did not impress record labels any more than the previous ones, and none took interest in the band. Despite their efforts, their music got little exposure and managed only to play at local events. As a last resort, the band recorded an independent, self-funded album.

Laiho wanted to use keyboards more effectively, but Pirisjoki was not attending rehearsals. He was fired and replaced with a friend of Raatikainen's, jazz pianist Janne "Warman" Wirman.

To sign with Spinefarm Records, the band was required to create a new name due to the contract they signed with Shiver records under the name Inearthed. The band stumbled upon Lake Bodom in their local phone book. The band found that the lake had an interesting story due to the Lake Bodom murders. A long list of possible names involving the word Bodom was made, and they settled on Children of Bodom.

=== Something Wild and Hatebreeder (1996–2000) ===
The original logo (top) was used only on the cover of the first pressing of the debut album Something Wild in November 1997. After that, the second logo has been in use for every subsequent release.

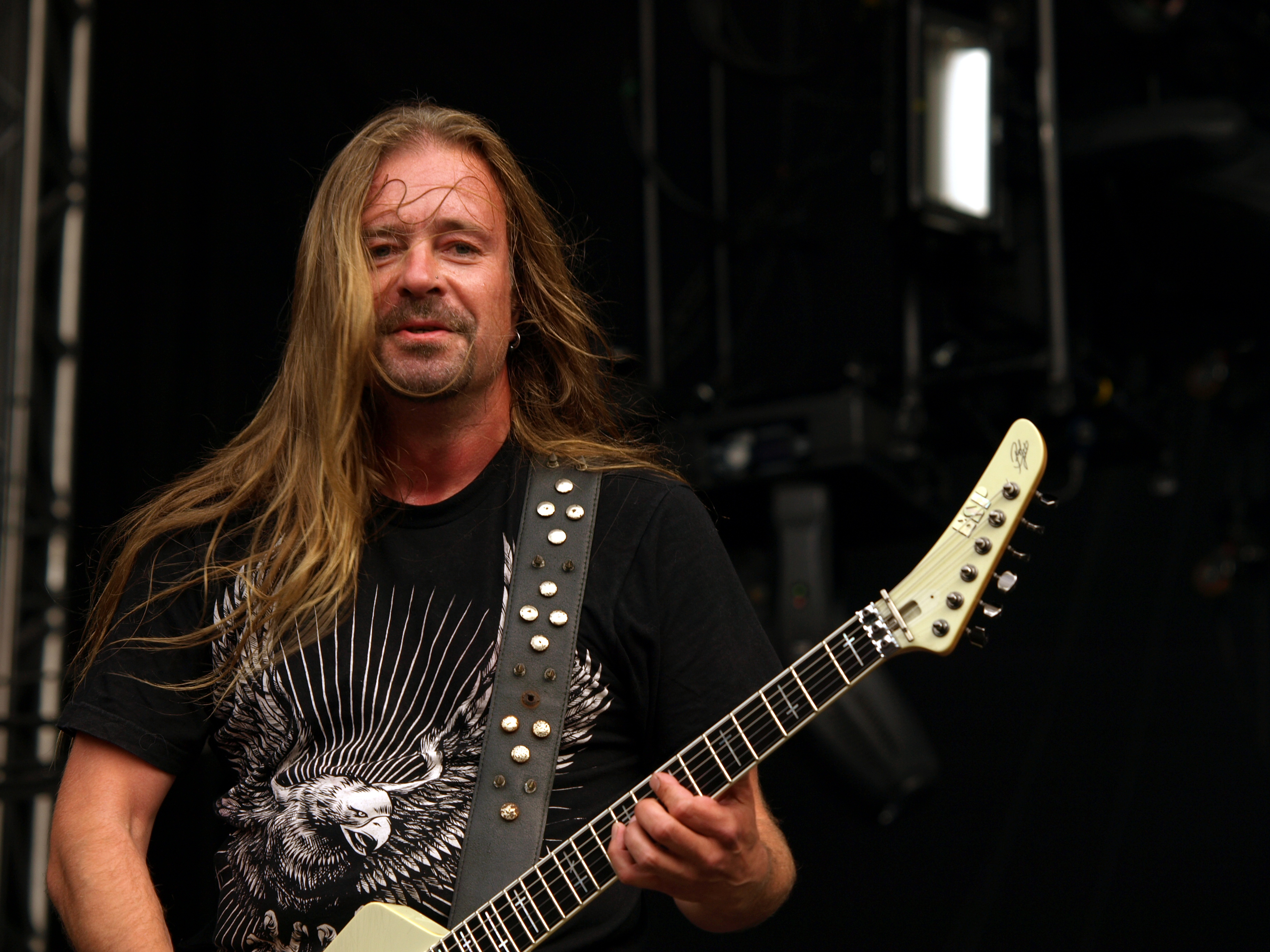
Roope Latvala

Anssi Kippo and Children of Bodom produced, recorded and mixed Something Wild at Astia-studios (Lappeenranta, Finland). To promote their band, they opened for Dimmu Borgir in 1997. Something Wild was released in late 1997 in Finland and in 1998 worldwide. In early 1998, for promotional purposes, the band recorded a music video for the song "Deadnight Warrior". The video was directed by Mika Lindberg and had a budget of €1000. It used of simple scenery, which consisted of an outdoors location after a snowstorm. The band played for a couple of hours at night, with an average temperature of minus fifteen degrees Celsius.

Although Laiho was very critical of the music he had written, he noted that he likes Something Wild the least of all of his albums. When recording this album, Laiho tried to mimic the style of his idol Yngwie Malmsteen, which is why Something Wild is considered one of the most technical Children of Bodom albums. Despite this, he considered it to be their "most important" record, as it "put them on the map."

Children of Bodom's first European tour began in February 1998. They played with bands such as Hypocrisy (at such festivals as Under the Black Sun), The Kovenant and Agathodaimon. Pianist Erna Siikavirta replaced Wirman for the duration of the tour.

Months later, the band recorded two new songs at Astia-studios with producer Anssi Kippo, "Towards Dead End" and "Children of Bodom". In late August, the band played the song "Forevermore" live for the first time during a show in Russia. This song was later renamed "Downfall".

Their second European tour occurred in September of that same year, but once more Wirman was not able to perform. Laiho's then-girlfriend Kimberly Goss (from Sinergy and formerly of Dimmu Borgir, Ancient and Therion) assumed the keyboards. By the end of the tour, Goss invited Laiho to join Sinergy, which at the time was in its early stages.

The second album, Hatebreeder, was recorded between the end of 1998 and the beginning of 1999 by Anssi Kippo at Astia-studios (Lappeenranta, Finland). It was originally titled Towards Dead End, but in the studio the band members opted for the current title. To create anticipation in Finland, the '"Downfall" single was released two weeks prior to the album's release. It was accompanied by a music video directed by Mika Lindberg. Hatebreeder topped the charts in many European countries. In July 1999, the success of "Downfall" and Hatebreeder allowed Children of Bodom to schedule three concerts in Japan with Sinergy and In Flames. During two of these concerts, the live album Tokyo Warhearts was recorded. In it, the band reproduced and at times improved on their songs. At their request, no overdubs were used on the recording of the concert.

=== Rise to popularity: Follow the Reaper and Hate Crew Deathroll (2000–2004) ===
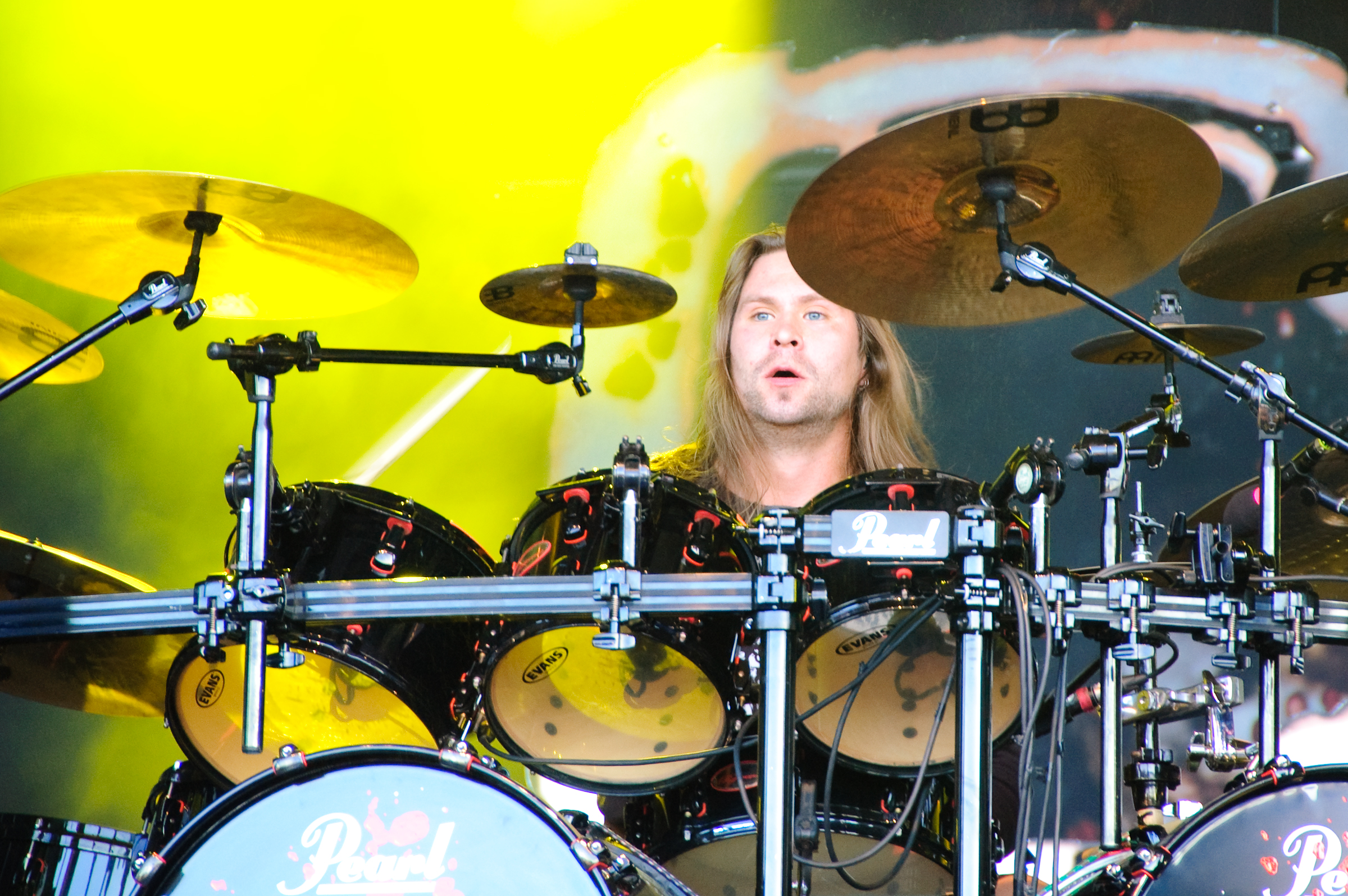
Jaska Raatikainen

For their next release, Children of Bodom used Peter Tägtgren's Abyss studio in Sweden instead of the Finnish Astia-studio from Anssi Kippo where they had recorded their previous releases, including the demos from Inearthed. The band wrote eight songs for the album. While in the studio, they included an extra track that was hastily composed and featured lyrics improvised by Laiho. That track would be named "Kissing the Shadows". The band named the album Follow the Reaper. Recording took place between August and September 2000. The album was released worldwide in late 2000. A music video for "Everytime I Die" was recorded by Finnish director Tuukka Temonen shortly after.

In February 2002, Children of Bodom began writing songs for their upcoming album, Hate Crew Deathroll. They returned to Astia-studio (Lappeenranta, Finland) with producer Anssi Kippo. The session ensued during the months of August and September. The album was released January 2003 in Finland. It remained on the top of the Finnish charts for three weeks and became the band's first gold album. All of the band's albums reached this status and Follow the Reaper reached platinum.

On 3 January 2003, the Finnish Metal Music Awards were held at Tavastia Club in Helsinki. Voting was open to metal fans and was presented through the various media outlets that were working with the event's organizers. Children of Bodom was awarded Finnish Band of the Year.

Children of Bodom's first world tour began in 2003 and lasted until late 2004. The tour had many sold-out concerts and marked the consolidation of the band in North America, but was accompanied by the announcement that Kuoppala quit Children of Bodom for personal reasons in the middle of the tour without warning. In an interview, when Laiho was asked why Kuoppala left the band, he stated that "Well, I try to be careful about what I say about him because there is no bad blood between us. He told me that he just got sick of touring and the whole band/rock 'n roll lifestyle living in hotels and tour buses and stuff. For me it was really weird because he was always the one who was SO into it! He was a die hard rock 'n roller and suddenly he made a quick 180 turn in his whole life. This whole situation involves a new girlfriend." Laiho invited Griffin's guitarist Kai Nergaard to replace Kuoppala, but he did not accept. Laiho's bandmate from Sinergy, Roope Latvala (founding member of Stone, one of the bands that started the heavy metal movement in Finland) assumed the guitars as a session player, until a permanent solution was found. This formation was introduced in Moscow on 16 August.

=== Breakthrough with Are You Dead Yet? (2004–2007) ===
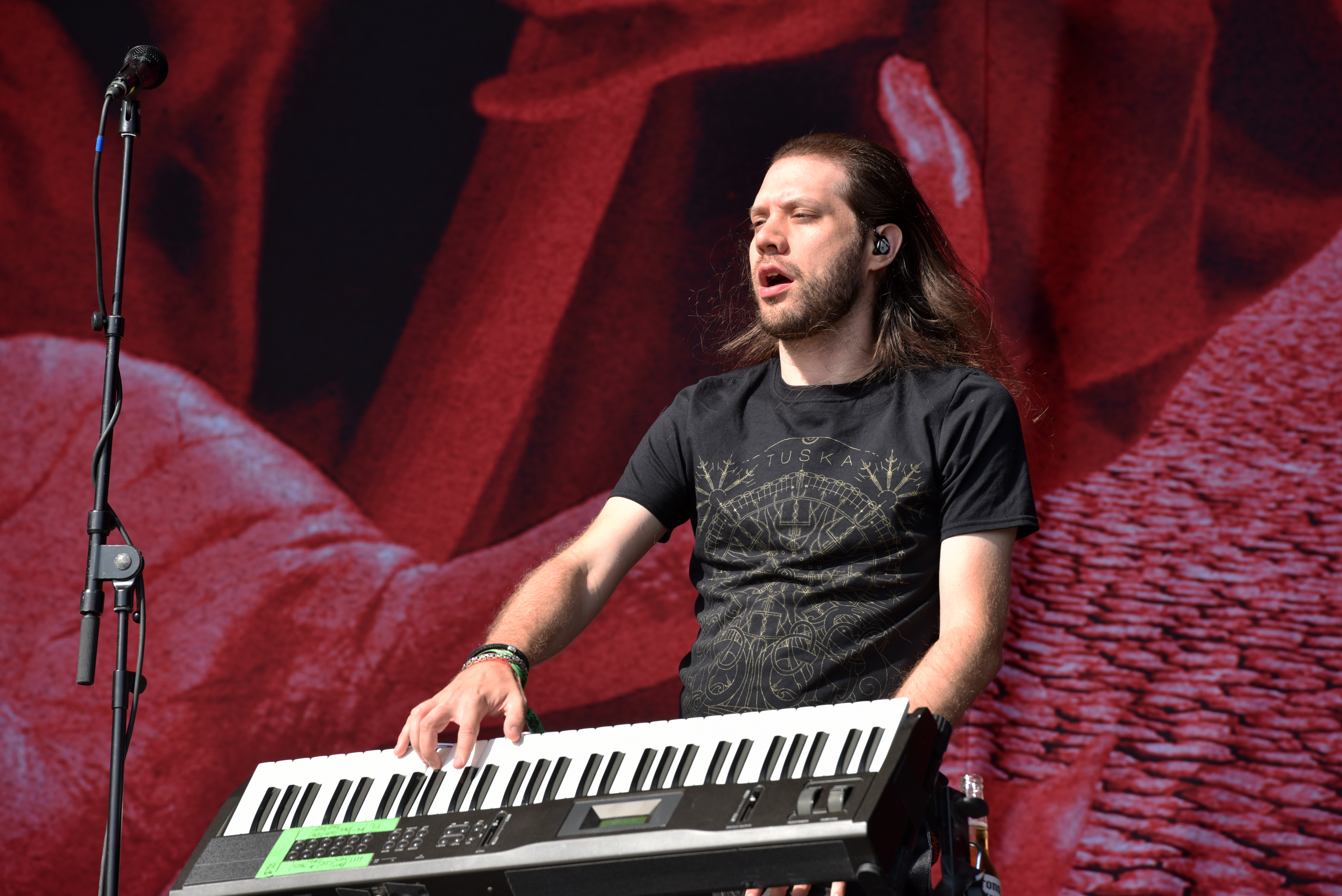
Janne Wirman

After finishing the world tour with Latvala – who assumed a permanent position in the band's line-up – Children of Bodom recorded and released the EP Trashed, Lost & Strungout and the single "In Your Face", which contained songs from their upcoming album and a parody cover of "Oops!... I Did It Again" by Britney Spears. In late 2005, the album Are You Dead Yet? was released, featuring a different style from the band's previous works. Simpler and heavier guitar riffs were incorporated into Children of Bodom's sound, as well as elements from industrial music. Reactions from fans to the release were varied. The album remains the band's most commercially successful. It was awarded gold status in Finland and reached first place on the Finnish charts, 16th in Germany, 16 in Sweden and 17 in Japan. The band's next release was a DVD single for the song "In Your Face", which included the music video, backstage footage from the band, and a live recording of the song "Sixpounder" at Wacken Open Air festival in 2004. In June, Children of Bodom was in front of 120,000 spectators, one of their biggest concerts, on the last concert of the Böhse Onkelz. The DVD of the concert, called Vaya Con Tioz, includes Children of Bodom's performance of "Everytime I Die".

The band performed at Wacken Open Air in August of 2006. Children of Bodom's live DVD Chaos Ridden Years - Stockholm Knockout Live was released on 5 December 2006. It contains a recording of a live concert performed on 5 February 2006 in Stockholm, Sweden, with over 90 minutes of live footage. "Chaos Ridden Years" refers to a documentary featuring interviews with band members about the history of the band and footage of the band on tour. It contains every music video Children of Bodom had made, except for "Needled 24/7". Metal Hammer magazine voted Laiho the world's best guitarist of 2006.

In June 2006, the band embarked on one of their biggest tours: The Unholy Alliance tour, playing alongside Slayer, Lamb of God, Mastodon, In Flames and Thine Eyes Bleed. The bands toured the US through June and July, and Europe through October and November.

On 31 January 2007, Laiho slid down the lane at a bowling alley after stepping over the foul line. He slammed into the wall and broke his left shoulder. This rendered him unable to play guitar for six weeks. Due to this incident, Children of Bodom cancelled their first 2007 tours, and a festival that they were slated to headline.

On 31 March 2007, the band's website released information on Laiho's condition stating that while Laiho's injury would never fully heal, it no longer affected his ability to play the guitar. The same notice stated that the band had already written some songs for a new album and would start recording sometime later in 2007.

=== Blooddrunk and Relentless Reckless Forever (2007–2012) ===
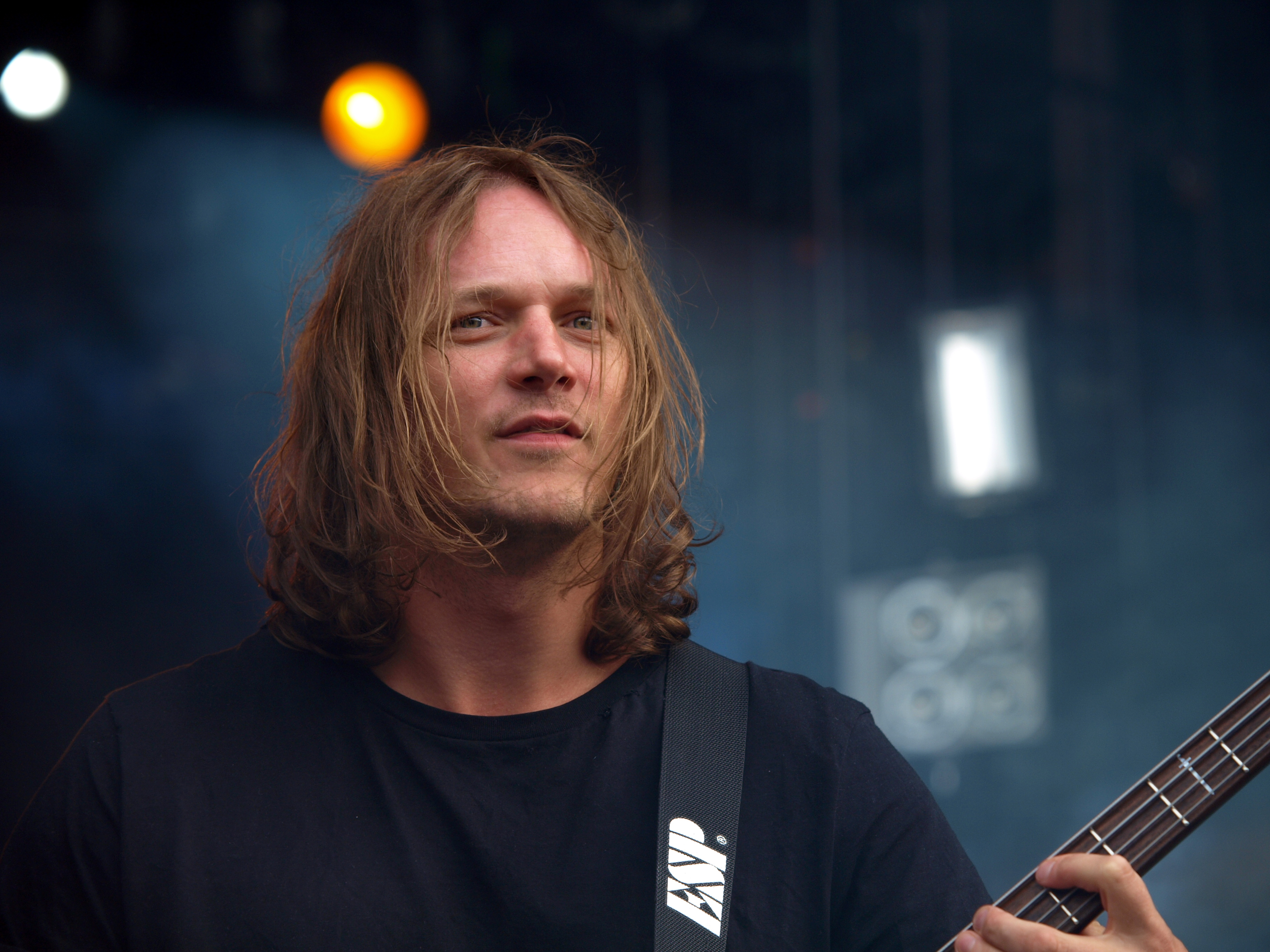
Henkka Seppälä

From October to December 2007, Children of Bodom recorded their sixth studio album, Blooddrunk, released on 15 April 2008. The album contained 10 songs including a cover of "Ghost Riders in the Sky". Children of Bodom was featured on the Gigantour 2008 North American tour with Megadeth, In Flames, Job for a Cowboy and High on Fire. Children of Bodom was one of the first bands to be confirmed for Wacken Open Air 2008, where they performed alongside many bands including Iron Maiden, Sonata Arctica and Avantasia. Children of Bodom played at Donington Download on 15 June, playing a mixture of old and new songs. On 8 March 2008, Children of Bodom did their first UK signing event at the Zavvi music shop in Oxford Street, London. They signed copies of their new single, "Blooddrunk", in CD, 7 inch and 12 inch vinyls. Only 666 copies of the 12-inch vinyls were made.

On 26 June 2008, Children of Bodom played their first show in Auckland, New Zealand with support from local acts Dawn of Azazel and Subtract at the Transmission Room. In 2008, Children of Bodom's first three studio albums, as well as Tokyo Warhearts, were remastered and re-released with bonus tracks. In September and October 2008, the band toured the U.S. supporting Blooddrunk with support from The Black Dahlia Murder and Between the Buried and Me. Testament made a special guest appearance in the main support slot at the tour's New York City date. In November and December 2008, the band toured in Europe supporting Slipknot and Machine Head. From late January to early March 2009, the band co-headlined the European tour with Cannibal Corpse with Diablo opening for them. On 2 April 2009, Children of Bodom embarked on the No Fear Energy Tour headlined by Lamb of God with main support from As I Lay Dying and themselves, and rotating opening slots with God Forbid and Municipal Waste, but dropped off the tour a week before it was finished following a serious injury Laiho sustained after falling from the top bunk of his tour bus on 26 April 2009, after the show in Palladium Ballroom, Dallas, Texas. In addition to the injury, on 8 May 2009, at Roseland Ballroom in New York City, Laiho and Children of Bodom quit playing after a few of their songs because of Laiho's previous injury. Laiho planned to continue touring despite his injury but was forced to cancel the last six dates when efforts to alleviate the pain failed. All summer festival dates went down as planned and were unaffected by Laiho's injury.

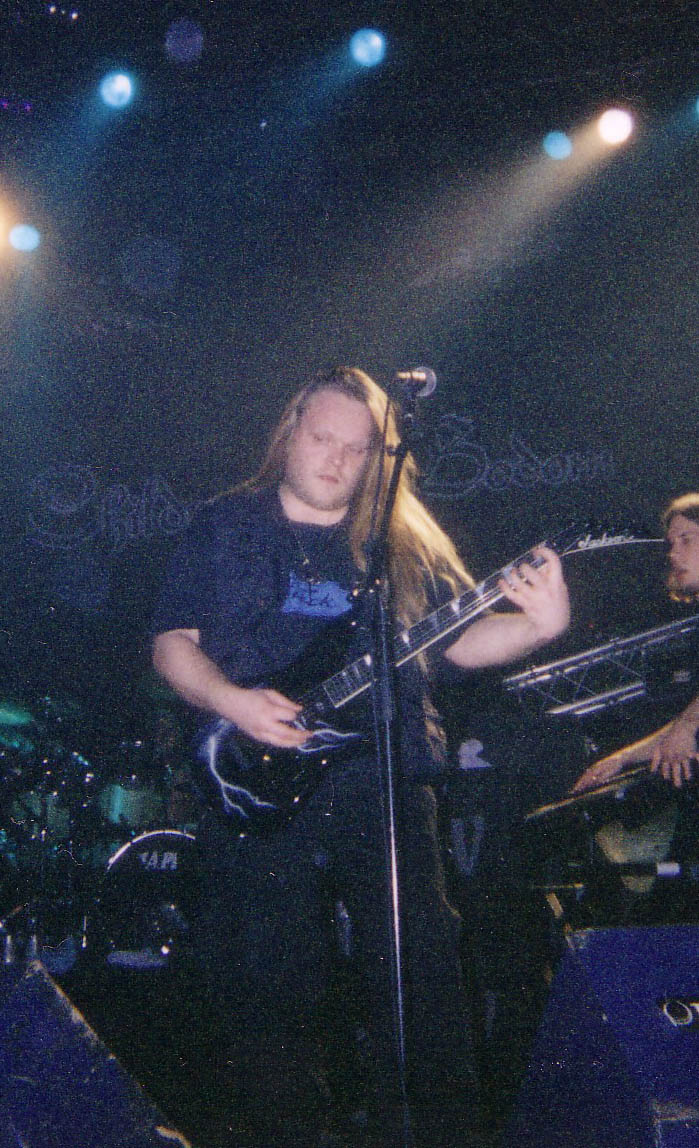
Alexander Kuoppala

In February 2009, Children of Bodom hinted at plans to release a cover album titled Skeletons in the Closet, which was released on 23 September 2009. They admitted to being "lazy" when it comes to practicing and talked about plans to have more songs on future albums. The band embarked on a tour of South America and Mexico in September 2009. Support for the trek came from Amorphis. Also in September and October 2009, the band returned to North America to headline a month-long tour. On most dates, support came from The Black Dahlia Murder and Skeletonwitch. Austrian Death Machine and Holy Grail made a special guest appearance in the main support slot at the tour's second Pomona, California date. On 18 October 2009, four days after the band's North American tour finale in Honolulu, Hawaii, they performed at Japan's Loudpark Festival with Megadeth, Judas Priest, Slayer, Anthrax, Rob Zombie and Arch Enemy. In the six days following their performance at the Loudpark Festival, they held three shows in Hong Kong, Taiwan and China respectively. They finished their two-month September-to-October tour in Moscow, Russia. This concluded their year-and-a-half-long Blooddrunk World Tour.

Skeletons in the Closet is a cover album released on 22 September 2009. It features covers released on versions of previous albums but also includes four new tracks. Covered artists include Suicidal Tendencies, Britney Spears, Alice Cooper, Iron Maiden, Slayer, Andrew WK, Billy Idol and Scorpions.

Children of Bodom ran a contest to promote their new album in which anyone could win prizes featuring an ESP/LTD M-53 electric guitar, the band's entire back catalog, and Skeletons in the Closet. The contest ran from 25 August to 21 September 2009. The winners were announced 28 September 2009.

=== Return to form with Halo of Blood (2010–2014) ===
After the Blooddrunk tour ended, Children of Bodom started recording a new album. During the recording of the drum tracks, there was a small tornado and the power was cut out. The recording was delayed until after their tour with Black Label Society. Children of Bodom released some information to Metal Hammer magazine about new album tracks. The three tracks they released were "Pussyfoot Miss Suicide", "Ugly", and "Was It Worth It?"

In November, the band announced "The Ugly World Tour 2011", which would run from March–May 2011 and would feature dates around Europe. Opening Acts were Ensiferum, Machinae Supremacy and Amon Amarth (UK only). On 24 November, it was announced that the title of the album would be Relentless Reckless Forever. The album was released on 8 March 2011. A music video for "Was It Worth It?" was produced, featuring skateboarder Chris Cole as well as pro skaters Jamie Thomas, Garrett Hill and Tom Asta. "Was It Worth It?" was released as a downloadable track for the video game Guitar Hero: Warriors of Rock in February 2011.

Halo of Blood was the band's eighth studio album. It was released on 6 June in Europe, 10 June in the United Kingdom and on 11 June in North America. The Mayhem Festival tour alongside Rob Zombie, Mastodon and Amon Amarth was announced on 18 March 2013.

Music journalist Neil Kelly of PopMatters said of the album, "Death metal could very well re-enter mainstream consciousness through Halo of Blood, the most accessible Children of Bodom release yet."

In May 2014, the band toured eastern Australia, visiting Brisbane, Sydney and Melbourne with Eye of the Enemy as support, along with Orpheus Omega in Melbourne, and Emergency Gate in Brisbane and Sydney.

=== I Worship Chaos, Hexed and final show (2014–2019) ===
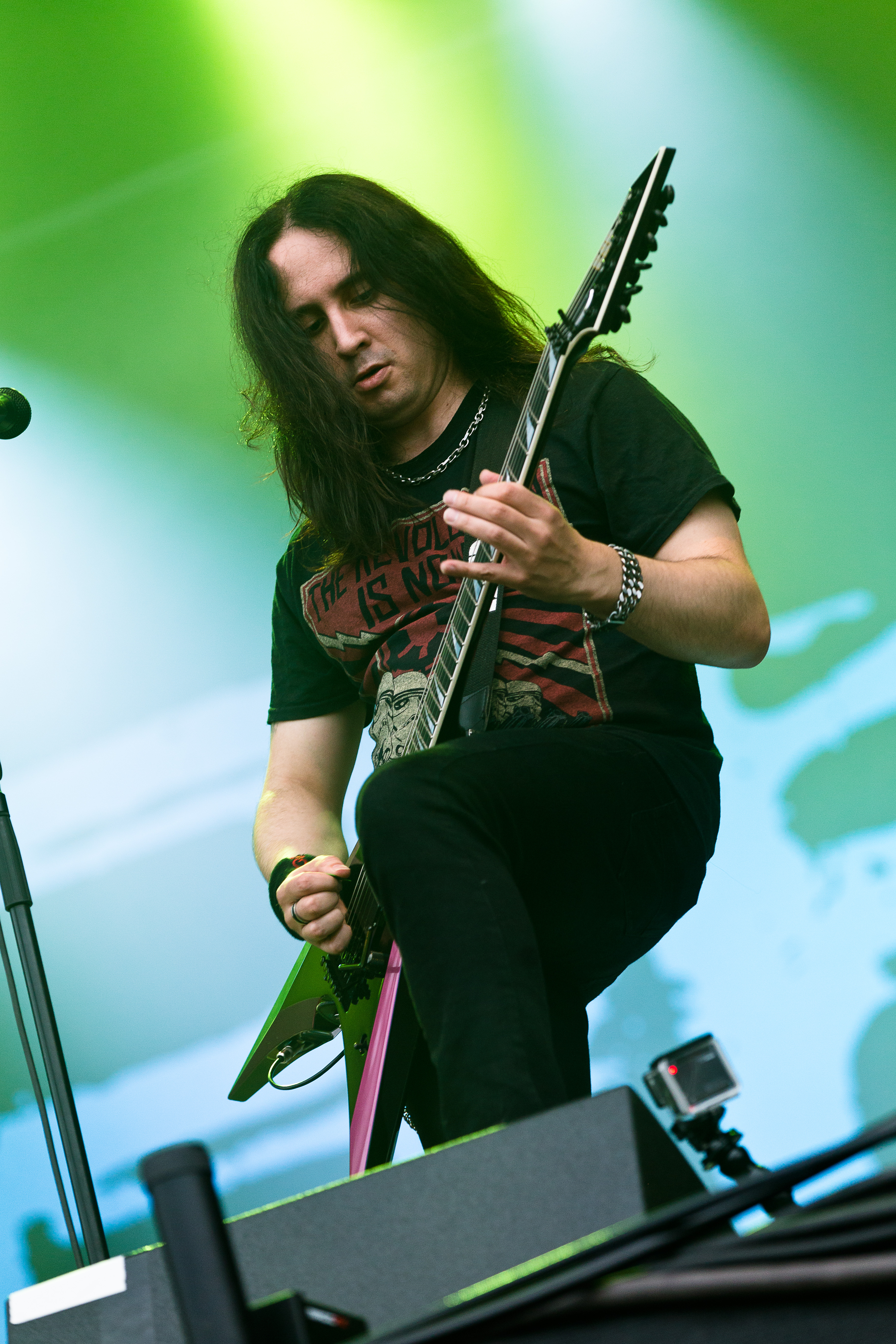
Rhythm guitarist Daniel Freyberg 2016

On 7 April 2015, the band announced that they had begun working on the follow-up to Halo of Blood. On 29 May 2015, the band announced on their Facebook page that Roope Latvala was no longer part of Children of Bodom, with the new album to be recorded as a four-piece for the first time. The band later updated that Latvala's role would be filled in by Antti Wirman, keyboardist Janne Wirman's younger brother, for live commitments until the end of the year. He debuted with the band in a private live show in Helsinki. In a later interview with Wirman, he stated that his brother would not join the band permanently. On 8 June 2015, the album title was announced as I Worship Chaos and was released through Nuclear Blast on 2 October 2015. On 19 January 2016, the band announced the addition of guitarist Daniel Freyberg. He made his live debut in Tampa, Florida on 9 February.

In an interview with Noizr Zine on 14 September 2017, Children of Bodom's keyboardist Janne Wirman was asked about the band's plans to start working on a new album with "the same production team" (Mikko Karmila and Mika Jussila) after the '20 Years Down & Dirty' tour ended. He said, "Yes, I think we are. And we're going to record it in our warehouse." In November 2017, bassist Henkka Seppälä discussed in an interview that the band had written half an album's worth of material. They started recording the new album in March 2018. In August 2018, Seppälä stated in an interview with TotalRock Radio that the album would be released in early 2019. In November 2018, the band revealed that the album would be called Hexed. It was released on 8 March 2019.

On 1 November 2019, it was announced that Children of Bodom would play their final show with the line-up at the time on 15 December. The show, dubbed "A Chapter Called Children of Bodom", took place at the Helsinki Ice Hall, Finland. The statement said:

"After almost 25 years with Bodom, thousands of shows & 10 albums, Henkka [Seppälä], Janne [Wirman] and Jaska [Raatikainen] have decided to step back and change direction within their lives. Alexi [Laiho] and Daniel [Freyberg] will have further announcements about their plans to keep creating new music in the future."

It was later reported that the main reason for the departures was that Raatikainen, Seppälä and Wirman could no longer share a viewpoint with Laiho. Laiho and Freyberg found a new bassist and a new drummer, according to Helsingin Sanomat. According to Finnish music zine Soundi, Laiho could not use the band's name without permission from his former bandmates.

The band released the final show as a live album on 15 December 2023.

=== Bodom After Midnight and death of Alexi Laiho (2020–2021) ===
Bodom After Midnight
- Origin: Helsinki, Finland
- Genre: Melodic death metal
- Years active: 2020–2021
- Labels: Napalm, Ward
- Past members: Alexi Laiho; Daniel Freyberg; Mitja Toivonen; Waltteri Väyrynen

In 2020, Laiho carried on with Freyberg in their new band, Bodom After Midnight. Bassist Mitja Toivonen (ex-Santa Cruz), drummer Waltteri Väyrynen (Paradise Lost) and touring keyboardist Lauri Salomaa joined them. The band made a live debut on 23 October 2020 in Seinäjoki, Finland with two more shows at Tavastia in Helsinki, Finland, where the band played an hour-long set of Children of Bodom songs.

On 4 January 2021, it was announced that Laiho had died in late December 2020 from health complications at the age of 41. Bodom After Midnight was working on its full-length debut album, and before his death, recorded three songs and shot a music video, which were announced to be released posthumously. On 10 February, the band announced the release of the EP Paint the Sky with Blood, released on 23 April 2021. The three-song EP features Laiho's final recordings, consisting of two original songs and a Dissection cover. Guitarist Daniel Freyberg stated that there would be no more releases: "There was no more songs written. That was all the songs, all the riffs Alexi ever presented us. So there's no leftovers."

In an April 2021 interview with Loudwire, Freyberg stated that Bodom After Midnight would not continue without Laiho: "Unfortunately, Bodom After Midnight as an active band is pretty much going to be buried with Alexi. We don't really feel comfortable using the name Bodom without Alexi, because it's so connected to him."

Their song "Paint the Sky With Blood" was elected by Loudwire as the 8th best metal song of 2021.

=== Reunion shows and future (2025–present) ===
On 28 October 2025, the surviving members of Children of Bodom announced that they were reuniting for a one-off tribute show dedicated to Laiho, titled A Celebration of Music, on 26 February 2026 at the Tavastia Club in Helsinki. The show sold out the day after its announcement, resulting in a second show held at the same venue on 27 February. In addition to Raatikainen, Seppälä and Wirman, both shows reunited the band with rhythm guitarist Alexander Kuoppala. Samy Elbanna of Lost Society filled in for Laiho on lead guitar and lead vocals. Although there were no other dates scheduled with the reunited lineup at the time, Wirman reportedly said on stage during the performance, "Just when I was looking to exit the music business soon and retire... It's not gonna happen if this is gonna keep happening."

On 10 March 2026, the band expressed interest in celebrating the 30th anniversary of their recording history in 2027, stating, "As many of you may know, next year will mark 30 years of Bodom's music. May the celebration continue." Children of Bodom are scheduled to co-headline the 2027 edition of Tuska Open Air Metal Festival in July of that year.

== Musical style and influences ==
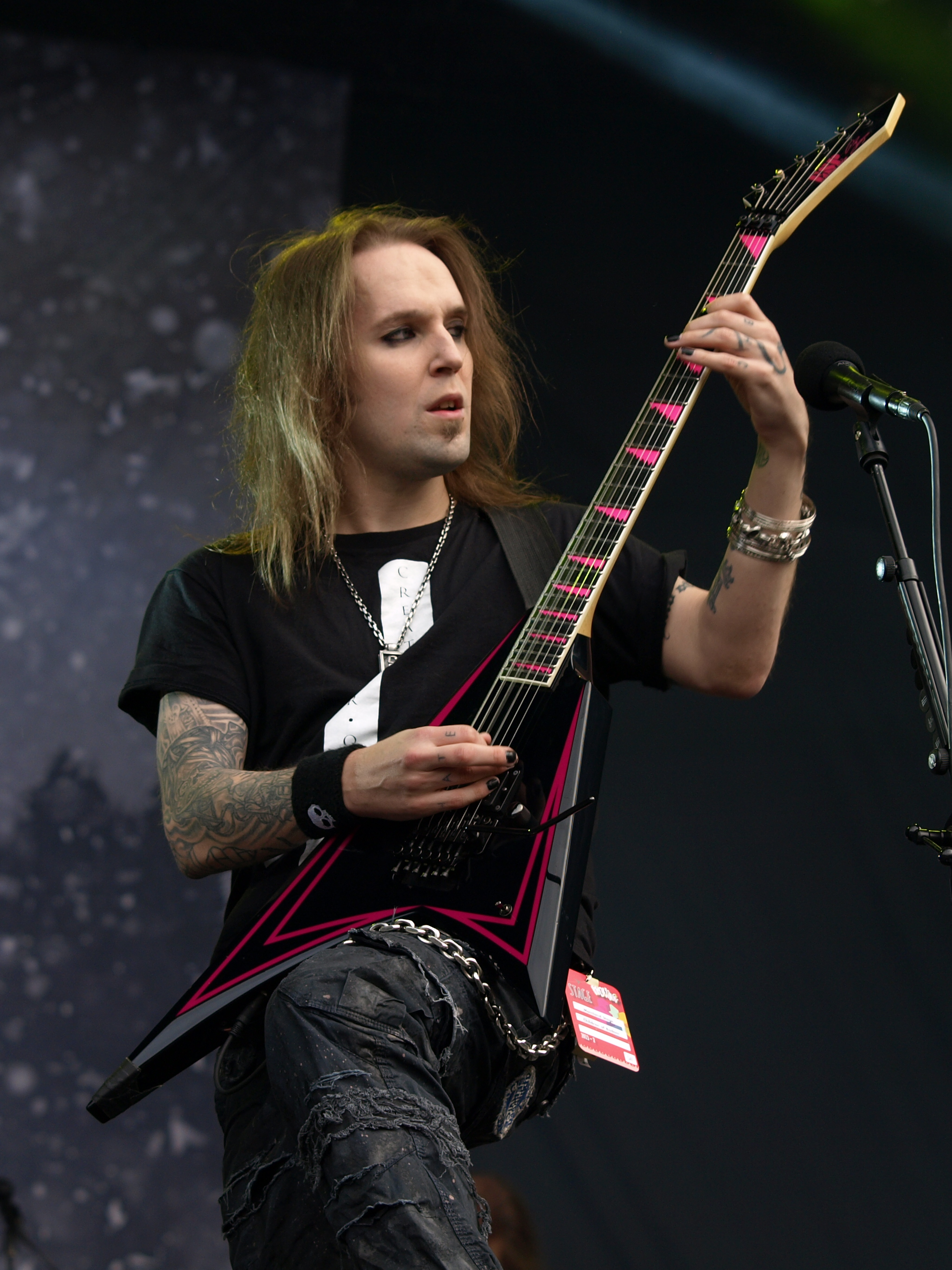
Frontman Alexi Laiho is "widely celebrated as one of the genre's most accomplished players" according to AllMusic.

Children of Bodom has been described as melodic death metal and power metal, combining the two genres together. Influences and inspirations to Children of Bodom were cited as a variety of artists such as Anthrax, Darkthrone, Dimmu Borgir, Entombed, Helloween, Yngwie Malmsteen and Stratovarius. Laiho said the following in regard to the band's influences and style: "It's something I can't really say when I developed the whole thing, or when we did, but you know, it's more like that it has been really developing in this direction for a period of many years [...] because I'm really into '80s heavy metal bands and then I'm also into these extreme bands, you know. So I guess it's just natural the way I come up with riffs and which are combined '80s heavy metal and extreme stuff, but it was never really planned but that's just how it turned out."

Guitarist Alexi Laiho has been, according to AllMusic, "widely celebrated as one of the genre's most accomplished players", while the band has an "instantly recognizable sound". His heavy metal guitar work is considered to be a hallmark of the band's sound, and Loudwire states that he is one of the fastest guitarists in the genre. He incorporates neoclassical music and glam metal influences into his shred guitar style. He is also known for his use of hooks.

== Legacy ==
Loudwire considers Children of Bodom to be among the greatest heavy metal bands of all time, saying Alexi Laiho was one of the fastest guitarists in the genre. In 2022, a restaurant bar dedicated to the band called Bodom Bar & Sauna was opened in Espoo, located next to the Niittykumpu metro station. As the name suggests, the bar also includes a public sauna.

== Band members ==
Current lineup

- Jaska Raatikainen – drums (1993–2019, 2026–present), keyboards (1993–1996)
- Henkka Seppälä – bass, backing vocals (1996–2019, 2026–present)
- Janne Wirman – keyboards, backing vocals (1997–2019, 2026–present)
- Alexander Kuoppala – rhythm guitar, backing vocals (1996–2003; 2026–present)
- Samy Elbanna – lead guitar, lead vocals (live member 2026–present)

Bodom After Midnight lineup (2020–2021)

- Alexi Laiho – lead guitar, lead vocals (died 2020)
- Daniel Freyberg – rhythm guitar, backing vocals
- Mitja Toivonen – bass, backing vocals
- Waltteri Väyrynen – drums
- Lauri Salomaa – keyboards, backing vocals (live member)

Former members

- Alexi Laiho – lead guitar, lead vocals (1993–2019), bass (1993–1994, 1995–1996), keyboards (1993–1996, 2019), rhythm guitar (1993–1996, 2003, 2015) (died 2020)
- Samuli Miettinen – bass, backing vocals (1994–1995)
- Jani Pirisjoki – keyboards, backing vocals (1994–1997), rhythm guitar (1994–1995)
- Roope Latvala – rhythm & lead guitar, backing vocals (2004–2015; live member 2003–2004)
- Daniel Freyberg – rhythm guitar, backing vocals (2016–2019)

Live members

- Erna Siikavirta – keyboards (1998)
- Kimberly Goss – keyboards, backing vocals (1998)
- Netta Skog – accordion (guest 2015, 2016)
- Antti Wirman – rhythm guitar, backing vocals (2015)

Timeline

== Discography ==
- Something Wild (1997)
- Hatebreeder (1999)
- Follow the Reaper (2000)
- Hate Crew Deathroll (2003)
- Are You Dead Yet? (2005)
- Blooddrunk (2008)
- Relentless Reckless Forever (2011)
- Halo of Blood (2013)
- I Worship Chaos (2015)
- Hexed (2019)

== See also ==
- List of best-selling music artists in Finland
