= Follow the Reaper =

Studio album by Children of Bodom
- Released: 30 October 2000
- Recorded: August–September 2000
- Studios: The Abyss, Pärlby, Sweden
- Genres: Melodic death metal; power metal; black metal
- Length: 38:14
- Labels: Spinefarm, Nuclear Blast
- Producers: Peter Tägtgren, Children of Bodom

Children of Bodom chronology
Tokyo Warhearts (1999)	Follow the Reaper (2000)	Hate Crew Deathroll (2003)

Singles from Follow the Reaper
- 1. "Hate Me!" Released: May 2000

Professional ratings
Review scores
Source	Rating
AllMusic	3/5 stars
Sputnikmusic	5/5 stars

Follow the Reaper is the third studio album by Finnish melodic death metal band Children of Bodom. It was released in Finland on 30 October 2000 by Spinefarm Records, and on 22 January 2001 internationally by Nuclear Blast Records.

== Background and recording ==
Follow the Reaper was recorded and mixed at Tägtgren's Abyss studio in Sweden. Tägtgren replaced Anssi Kippo, with whom Children of Bodom had recorded all of their previous releases. Bassist Henkka Seppälä recalled the band's choice of producer and the album's recording process:

We were afraid that if we recorded the album in the same studio it would sound like our previous albums and that wasn't what we wanted this time, but besides that we wanted this release to sound heavier than our previous ones, and Peter seemed the best man for the job and Peter did a great job. Although for the first three weeks he wasn't even around and we recorded all of the music on our own. But then when we started with the vocals Peter jumped in and gave us lots of advice on how the vocals should be sounding. Cause, as you know, Peter himself also has lots of singing and producing experience, but he also helped us with the keyboards parts. At one time he just wanted to have the right sound for the keyboard piece and he had the choice out of 500 different keyboard sounds, but he kept on trying 'til the best sound came out.

== Music ==
The album is the first on which the band seriously moved toward a power metal-inspired sound, brought by Hypocrisy frontman and new producer Peter Tägtgren. The album's guitar work incorporates influence from neoclassical music. The album's sound is a fusion of elements of traditional heavy metal and extreme metal, though it leans more heavily towards the former. AllMusic described the sound as "black metal with the happiest keyboards the genre has ever seen, yet still uncompromisingly brutal." The keyboard work is considered to be complex. Some of the material has drawn comparisons to Emerson, Lake and Palmer. The album's material is played at various tempos.

The songs on the album were all recorded in D standard tuning (D, G, C, F, A, D), just like in Hatebreeder and Hate Crew Deathroll.

== Reception and legacy ==
AllMusic gave the album three stars out of five.

Many songs on the album became live setlist favorites, such as "Everytime I Die", "Hate Me!", and the title track. The song "Mask of Sanity" is a remake of the song "Talking of the Trees" from their early demo Shining (released as IneartheD). A deluxe edition featuring two bonus tracks was released in 2006.

In 2020, Loudwire stated that many fans consider the album to be the band's best work: "A perfect fusion of melody, riffs, and unforgettable hook after hook, Bodom brought something new to the table taking the best elements of traditional heavy metal and extreme metal to concoct a sonic brew that still unhinges jaws to this day."

Some journalists consider it to be among the best metal releases of the 2000s. Metal Hammer wrote in 2023: "Extreme metal may present itself as evil, but this masterstroke zeroed in on the silliness at its heart and cranked it up to 11 for the world to adore."

== Track listing ==
All tracks are written by Alexi Laiho.

No.	Title	Length
1.	"Follow the Reaper"	3:47
2.	"Bodom After Midnight"	3:43
3.	"Children of Decadence"	5:33
4.	"Everytime I Die"	4:02
5.	"Mask of Sanity"	3:58
6.	"Taste of My Scythe"	3:58
7.	"Hate Me!"	4:44
8.	"Northern Comfort"	3:47
9.	"Kissing the Shadows"	4:32

Reissue bonus tracks
No.	Title	Writer(s)	Length
10.	"Don't Stop at the Top" (Scorpions cover)	Klaus Meine, Herman Rarebell, Rudolf Schenker	3:24

Japan reissue bonus tracks
No.	Title	Writer(s)	Length
10.	"Shot in the Dark" (Ozzy Osbourne cover)	Ozzy Osbourne, Phil Soussan	3:38
11.	"Hellion" (W.A.S.P. cover)	Blackie Lawless	3:02

Nuclear Blast deluxe edition bonus tracks
No.	Title	Writer(s)	Length
10.	"Hellion" (W.A.S.P. cover)		3:02
11.	"Aces High" (Iron Maiden cover)	Steve Harris	4:30

Re-release bonus tracks
No.	Title	Length
10.	"Hate Me!" (Original single version)	4:47
11.	"Hellion" (W.A.S.P. cover)	3:02

== Personnel ==
Children of Bodom

- Alexi Laiho – lead guitar, vocals
- Alexander Kuoppala – rhythm guitar
- Janne Wirman – keyboards
- Henkka Seppälä – bass
- Jaska Raatikainen – drums

Production

- Peter Tägtgren – production, engineering
- Children of Bodom – production
- Lars Szöke – assistant engineering
- Mikko Karmila – additional treatment
- Mike "Count" Jussila – mastering

Additional personnel

- King Sami Saramäki – graphic design
- J. S. Karjalainen – assistant photographer
- Toni Härkönen – band photographs

== Charts ==
Chart (2000–01)	Peak position
Austrian Albums (Ö3 Austria)	38
Finnish Albums (Suomen virallinen lista)	3
French Albums (SNEP)	88
German Albums (Offizielle Top 100)	46
