= Something Wild (album) =

Studio album by Children of Bodom
- Released: 16 November 1997
- Recorded: July–August 1997
- Studio: Astia-Studios
- Genres: Melodic black/death; power metal
- Length: 35:57
- Labels: Spinefarm, Nuclear Blast
- Producers: Anssi Kippo, Children of Bodom

Children of Bodom chronology
Something Wild (1997)	Hatebreeder (1999)

Professional ratings
Review scores
Source	Rating
AllMusic	4/5 stars
Metalitalia	9/10
Metal.de	10/10
Metalfan	91%
Metal1.info	8.5/10

Something Wild is the debut studio album by Finnish melodic death metal band Children of Bodom, released in 1997 in Finland, and in 1998 worldwide. Upon release, the album was met with universal acclaim. In 2020, it was named one of the 20 best metal albums of 1997 by Metal Hammer magazine.

Something Wild was an innovative and pioneering album in extreme metal by incorporating elements of power metal, a sound not seen in other melodic death metal bands of the time; this fusion was inspired by Stratovarius.

Something Wild entered the Finnish album charts at number 35 in the last week of December, 1997. It would spend 12 weeks in the album chart peaking at number 20 in January of 1999. The album would re-enter the Finnish album charts in October of 2021 at number 19. It would spend one week in the charts.

== Track listing ==
No.	Title	Length
1.	"Deadnight Warrior"	3:22
2.	"In the Shadows"	6:01
3.	"Red Light in My Eyes, Pt 1"	4:28
4.	"Red Light in My Eyes, Pt 2"	3:50
5.	"Lake Bodom"	4:02
6.	"The Nail"	6:18
7.	"Touch Like Angel of Death" (includes hidden track (Note: "Touch Like Angel of Death" ends at 4:05. Hidden keyboard solo (also called "Coda") starts at 5:58, after one minute and 53 seconds of silence, and ends at 7:17, followed by 29 seconds of silence.))	7:46
8.	"Bruno the Pig" (hidden track (Note: Silent track. Some reissues skip this track and move the silence and keyboard solo from the previous track to "Mass Hypnosis" which also ends at 4:05.))	0:10
Total length:		35:57

Notes

Reissue
No.	Title	Length
8.	"Silent Scream" (Slayer cover)	3:17
9.	"Don't Stop at the Top" (Scorpions cover)	3:24
10.	"Mass Hypnosis" (Sepultura cover)	7:18

Spinefarm digipak reissue bonus tracks
No.	Title	Length
8.	"Children of Bodom (Original Single Version)"	5:10
9.	"Mass Hypnosis" (Sepultura cover)	7:18

== Personnel ==
- Alexi Laiho – lead guitar, vocals, songwriting, keyboards (on hidden track)
- Alexander Kuoppala – rhythm guitar, solo on "Red Light In My Eyes Pt 1", keyboards (on hidden track)
- Henkka Seppälä – bass
- Janne Wirman – keyboards (on everything except hidden track)
- Jaska Raatikainen – drums

Production

- Produced by Anssi Kippo, Alexi Laiho, Jaska Raatikainen, and Children of Bodom
- Recorded and mixed by Anssi Kippo
- Assistant engineer – Jokke Ryhanen
- Assistant mixing engineer – Pasi Karppa
- Cover photo by Graham French
- Band photography by Toni Harkonen
- Cover artwork by Flo V. Schwarz (aka Flea Black)

== Charts ==
Chart (2021)	Peak position
Finnish Albums (Suomen virallinen lista)	19
