= Alexi Laiho =

Finnish musician (1979–2020)

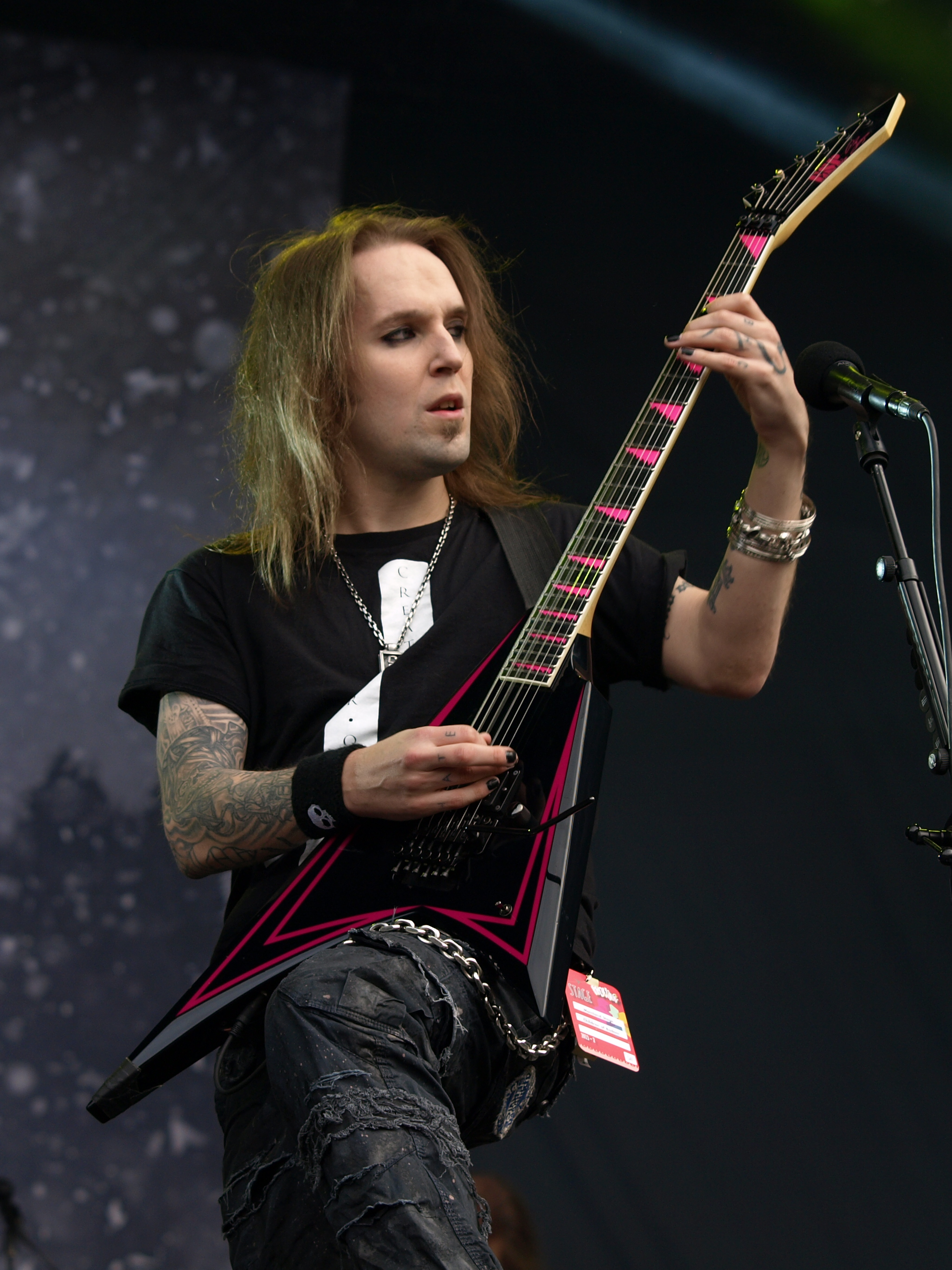
- Laiho performing at Provinssirock 2013

Background information
- Also known as: Wildchild
- Born: Markku Uula Aleksi Laiho; 8 April 1979; Espoo, Finland
- Died: 29 December 2020 (aged 41) Helsinki, Finland
- Genres: Melodic death metal; power metal; neoclassical metal
- Occupations: Musician; singer; songwriter
- Instruments: Guitars; vocals
- Years active: 1993–2020
- Formerly of: Children of Bodom; Bodom After Midnight; Sinergy; Kylähullut; Impaled Nazarene; Thy Serpent; the Local Band
- Spouse: Kimberly Goss (m. 2002)
- Website: cobhc.com

Alexi Laiho (Finnish: [ˈɑleksi ˈlɑi̯ho]; born Markku Uula Aleksi Laiho; 8 April 1979 – 29 December 2020) was a Finnish guitarist, vocalist and songwriter. He was the lead guitarist, lead vocalist and founding member of the melodic death metal band Children of Bodom, and a guitarist for Sinergy, the Local Band, Kylähullut, and Bodom After Midnight, which formed just prior to his death. Laiho had previously played with Thy Serpent and Impaled Nazarene on occasion, as well as Warmen and Hypocrisy.

== Career ==
Laiho started playing violin at the age of seven and guitar at the age of eleven. His main guitar influence was Helloween. He then became interested in more extreme music, mainly black metal.

His first guitar was a Tokai Stratocaster.

In 1993, after taking part in an experimental band named T.O.L.K. with friends he met while attending the Finnish Pop & Jazz Conservatory, Laiho formed Children of Bodom together with drummer Jaska Raatikainen, under the name of IneartheD.

On 31 October 1997, prior to releasing their debut album, Children of Bodom played their first concert in Helsinki, as the opening act for Norway's Dimmu Borgir.

Silenoz, Dimmu Borgir guitarist, on Laiho's first performance: "We could hear the opening band playing from backstage. We were like, ‘Holy shit, what is this?' It sounded like Yngwie Malmsteen on speed. We ran out and watched the spectacle and stood there with our jaws open". "There was this fucking beast on the guitar," added Dimmu's then-keyboardist Kimberly Goss, who formed power metal band Sinergy with Alexi in 1997, and married him in 2002. "I was looking at our guitar player like, ‘I don't know, man, you've got some competition..."

Laiho recorded three full-length albums with Sinergy. An unreleased fourth album was recorded and slated to be released in 2005, but the finishing touches were never completed due to Laiho's demanding schedule with Children of Bodom.

In 2004, Laiho founded a side-project called Kylähullut, which was assembled together with drummer Tonmi Lillman (ex-Sinergy) and singer Vesa Jokinen 69er of Finnish punk band Klamydia. Their discography includes two EP's, and two full-length albums one of which features Laiho's wife, Goss, singing in Finnish.

Children of Bodom played at the 2008 Metal Hammer Golden Gods Awards. There, Laiho also received the Dimebag Award for "Best Shredder" and performed a track off of Bodom's 2008's album, Blooddrunk.

Laiho appears on Canadian thrash metal outfit Annihilator's 2007 album, Metal, as a guest, playing a guitar solo on the song "Downright Dominate".

On 3 July 2012, Children of Bodom announced on their Facebook page that they had to cancel two European shows because Laiho had been taken to the hospital because of severe stomach pain. The frontman was hospitalized once again the following year in Nashville, leading to speculation about his dangerous relationship with alcohol, which he'd later discuss in multiple interviews.

On 15 December 2019, Children of Bodom played their last show at the Icehall in Helsinki, dubbed "A Chapter Called Children of Bodom"; in November it was announced that after this show, the group would disband after over two decades together. For legal reasons, Laiho would no longer be able to continue using the Children of Bodom name.

In March 2020, Laiho announced his new band together with former Children of Bodom guitarist Daniel Freyberg, Bodom After Midnight featuring drummer Waltteri Väyrynen and bassist Mitja Toivonen.

Laiho died on 29 December 2020 due to liver degeneration resulting from years of alcohol abuse, leaving behind a few songs recorded with Bodom After Midnight to be published posthumously. Several months later, Daniel Freyberg told Loudwire that Bodom After Midnight would disband rather than replacing Laiho. Regarding his death, in a 2023 interview, former Children of Bodom keyboardist Janne Wirman reflected back to what Alexi Laiho had told him in 2016 after his health issues came to light, that he had no plans to stop drinking but instead plans to drink himself to death.

== Musical style and influences ==
Laiho's main influences were classic metal bands like Manowar, Helloween, Judas Priest and W.A.S.P. Along with the classic metal bands, Laiho has cited guitarists such as Steve Vai and Yngwie Malmsteen as other influences on his early guitar playing style.

== Awards and recognition ==
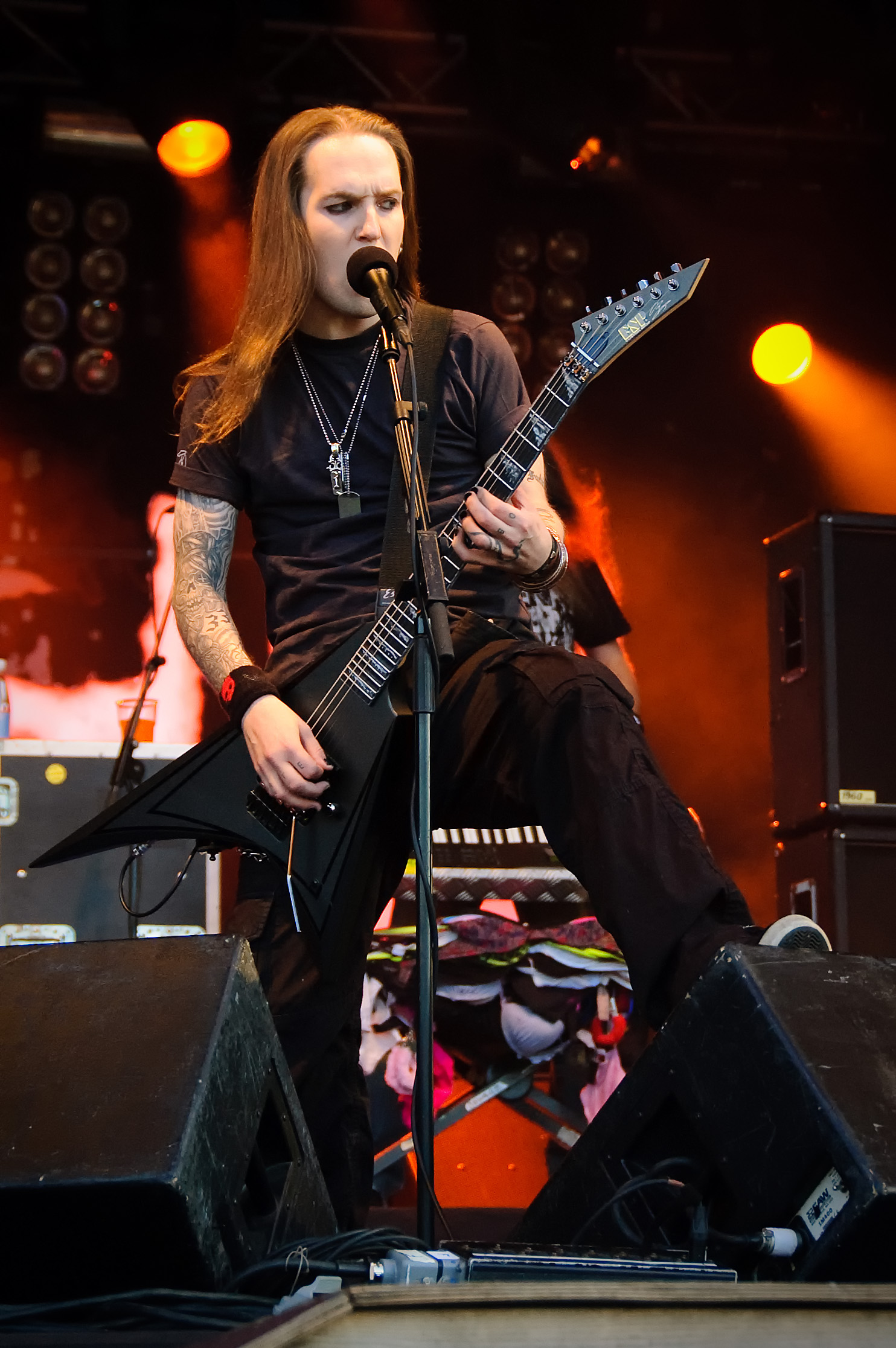
Laiho performing in 2009

Laiho has often been described as a visionary who brought back melody and flamboyance to metal music in a post-grunge and nu metal era. His guitar style was influenced by black metal, power metal and classical music, all cemented together by blistering solos. He was known for his guitar-keyboard solo duels with Janne Wirman, keyboardist in his band Children of Bodom. Alexi also incorporated various references to classical music in his early works.

Laiho received a Metal Hammer Golden Gods prize in the category of Dimebag Darrell Shredder Award in 2008.

Laiho received widespread acclaim for his guitar work and according to AllMusic, he is "widely celebrated as one of the genre's most accomplished players". In 2004 he was ranked No. 96 out of 100 Greatest Heavy Metal Guitarists of All Time by Guitar World. Guitar World magazine has also ranked him as one of the 50 fastest guitarists in the world. In addition, Roadrunner Records ranked Laiho at No. 41 out of 50 of the greatest metal frontmen. Furthermore, Total Guitar conducted a public voting poll to determine the greatest metal guitarist of all time; Laiho was voted No. 1 out of 20 metal guitarists, with over 20% of the vote. In 2023, Loudwire ranked Laiho number 24 on their list of The 75 Best Hard Rock + Metal Guitarists of all time.

== Personal life and death ==
On 1 February 2002, at a private ceremony in Finland, Laiho married long time girlfriend and Sinergy frontwoman Kimberly Goss. They shared identical tattoos of a coiled snake around their ring fingers and had each other's initials tattooed on the upper part of their left arms. According to official documents, Laiho filed for divorce in November 2002, but withdrew his application, never to file it again. The couple separated in 2004, but were on good terms and had regular text and video contact until the day he died, as confirmed by the Finnish press. Drama and infighting between Laiho's sister and widow resulted in a public back and forth exchange, with both parties airing their grievances to the Finnish media.

For several years after his separation from Goss, Laiho was then linked with Kristen Mulderig, manager of Slayer until mid-2015 and then with Kelli Wright, an Australian public relations manager. During his final years Laiho maintained a private relationship with a non-public figure from Southern Europe, fiercely protecting her from the spotlight until his death.

Laiho had a history of alcohol abuse, which was the cause of his death. In an interview in 2019 he talked about how the pressures of life on the road affected him; he mentioned the song "This Road" from 2019's Hexed and said, "A lot of people thought it was about alcoholism, but it's more about being addicted to being on the road. Sometimes it feels like after 20 years of being on the road, everything just becomes kind of a blur and you don't know what the hell's going on." He claimed he used to drink heavily but cut back in 2013, not drinking while on tour anymore, and mentioned that Hexed's first single, "Under Grass and Clover", documented the pain of withdrawal. In 2023, Children of Bodom keyboardist Janne Wirman revealed that Alexi Laiho never actually stopped drinking, and in 2016 had told him "I'm going to drink until I die." In 2024, Janne Wirman revealed that after Alexi's return from Australia, where he had spent time with his partner, Kelli Wright, his bandmates started noticing that Laiho's health was deteriorating. Wirman remarked that Laiho had lost a lot of weight and his attempts to play guitar ended up in failure, as he "couldn't play at all". In the same interview, Henkka Seppälä admitted that they had talked to Alexi at the end of the "Hexed" tour, however this only ended up in having an argument. The bassist also points out that their tour manager "had phone numbers to every city's morgue during their tour, in case they found Alexi dead in his bunk".

On 4 January 2021, a post on his official Facebook page stated Laiho had died the previous week. No official cause of death was given, only stating he succumbed at his Helsinki home to "long-term health issues during his last years". The death date was later confirmed to be 29 December 2020. A private funeral service for Laiho was held on 28 January 2021.

On 5 March 2021 Kimberly Goss revealed the official cause of Laiho's death on her Instagram: "alcohol-induced degeneration of the liver and pancreas connective tissue". Additionally, a mix of painkillers, opioids and insomnia medication was found in his system. The cause of death was originally published in Finnish as "maksan rasvarappeutuminen ja haiman sidekudostuminen", which translates into English as fatty liver disease and pancreatic fibrosis. Laiho's sister stated that the family wanted the details of his death to remain private, however Goss maintained that it was her right as his legal widow to disclose the information and bring closure to his fans, hoping the tragedy could inspire lives to be saved and "help others struggling with these same demons."

Laiho's ashes were laid to rest on 8 December 2021, one day after a private memorial service was held by Goss.

== Discography ==
Inearthed (Demos)

- 1994: Implosion of Heaven
- 1995: Ubiguitous Absence of Remission
- 1996: Shining

Children of Bodom

Main article: Children of Bodom discography
- 1997: Something Wild
- 1999: Hatebreeder
- 2000: Follow the Reaper
- 2003: Hate Crew Deathroll
- 2005: Are You Dead Yet?
- 2008: Blooddrunk
- 2009: Skeletons in the Closet
- 2011: Relentless Reckless Forever
- 2013: Halo of Blood
- 2015: I Worship Chaos
- 2019: Hexed

Sinergy

- 1999: Beware the Heavens
- 2000: To Hell and Back
- 2002: Suicide by My Side

Kylähullut

- 2004: Keisarinleikkaus (EP)
- 2005: Turpa täynnä
- 2007: Lisää persettä rättipäille (EP)
- 2007: Peräaukko sivistyksessä

Impaled Nazarene

- 2000: Nihil

Warmen

- 2005: Accept the Fact
- 2009: Japanese Hospitality
- 2014: First of the Five Elements

The Local Band

- 2015: Locals Only - Dark Edition (EP)

Bodom After Midnight

- 2021: Paint the Sky with Blood (EP)

Guest appearances

- 1999: All Eternity – To/Die/For ("In the Heat of the Night")
- 2003: Norther – Dreams of Endless War [guitars in "Youth Gone Wild" cover]
- 2003: No Holds Barred – Griffin ("The Sentence", "Bleed")
- 2003: Norther – Mirror of Madness [backing vocals on "Dead", "Everything Is An End", "Mirror Of Madness"]
- 2003: Klamydia – Seokset (guitar and vocals on "Latomeri")
- 2005: Lauri Porra – Lauri Porra ("Solutions")
- 2006: Raskaampaa Joulua (Various artists) – [guitar solo on "Petteri Punakuono (Rudolph the Red Nosed Reindeer)"]
- 2006: Rytmihäiriö – Seitsemän Surman Siunausliitto [guitar solo on "Pyörillä Kulkeva Kuoleman Enkeli"]
- 2006: Stoner Kings – Fuck the World [guitar solo on "Mantric Madness"] (2006)
- 2007: Guitar Heroes album – [all guitars and bass on the song "Sioux City Sarsaparilla", and guitar solo on "12 Donkeys"]
- 2007: Godsplague – H8 [guitar solo on "Don't Come Back"; backing vocals on "H8"]
- 2007: Pain – Psalms of Extinction [guitar solo on "Just Think Again"]
- 2007: Annihilator – Metal [guitar solo duel with Jeff Waters on "Downright Dominate"]
- 2008: Megadeth Live – Peace Sells [Gigantour 08 live background Vocals]
- 2009: Saattue – Vuoroveri [guitar solo on "Vapahtaja"]
- 2011: Root (Live) [Additional Guitar] – Adrenaline – Deftones
- 2013: Klamydia — Rakas Hullu
- 2013: Spirit in the Room — The Killing Moon
- 2014: Marty Friedman – Lycanthrope (With Danko Jones)
- 2015: Various Artists – Immortal Randy Rhoads – "Mr. Crowley"
- 2019: Wednesday 13 — Necrophaze – "Animal"
- 2019: Stoner Kings — Alpha Male — "Down to Zero"
- 2020: Pyhimys — MIKKO — "Fuck the World"
