= Anssi Kippo =

Finnish record producer (born 1976)

Anssi Kippi
- Born: 5 September 1976 (age 50); Lappeenranta, Finland
- Occupation: Record producer
- Notable work: Children of Bodom, Ensiferum, Sonata Arctica

Anssi Kippo (born 5 September 1976) is a Finnish record producer and sound engineer, known for his work in the Finnish heavy metal music scene. Kippo founded Astia Studios in 1994 and has produced and engineered many musical acts over the years. Kippo continues to manage both Astia A and B studios.

== Career ==
Kippo started his career as a sound engineer in the early 2000s, and quickly gained a reputation for his technical expertise and attention to detail. He has worked with a variety of Finnish metal bands, including Children of Bodom, Ensiferum, Sonata Arctica, and many others.
