= Jaska Raatikainen =

Finnish drummer (born 1979)

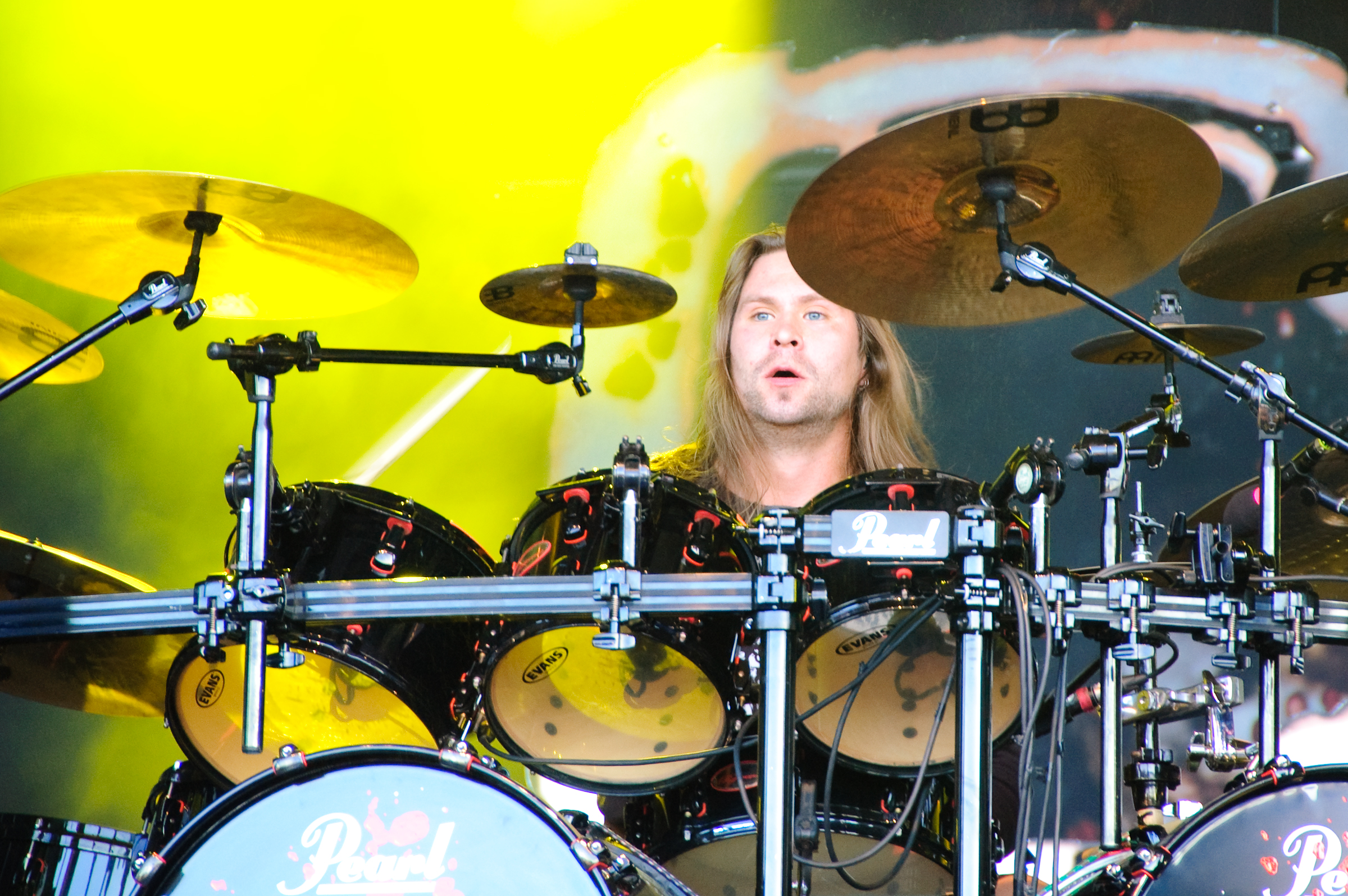
- Jaska Raatikainen at the Ilosaarirock 2009 festival

Background information
- Also known as: Jaska W. Raatikainen
- Born: Jaska Ilmari Raatikainen; 18 July 1979 (age 47); Lappeenranta, Finland
- Genres: Melodic death metal, power metal
- Occupation: Drummer
- Years active: 1993–present
- Member of: Children of Bodom, Mercury Circle
- Website: cobhc.com

Jaska Raatikainen (born 18 July 1979) is a Finnish musician who was the drummer and co-founder of the melodic death metal band Children of Bodom from 1993 until its disbandment in 2019, and as of the band's reunion in 2025, he is the only remaining original member left in the current lineup. Raatikainen is currently in the project called Mercury Circle.

== Early life ==
Raatikainen's first instrument was the piano, and during most of his childhood also played the French horn in a big band – a fact which later led him to be introduced to Alexander Kuoppala. It was only at the age of 12 that he began playing drums; he had his first double bass pedals before he owned a drum kit.

== Career ==
=== Children of Bodom ===
When Raatikainen met Alexi Laiho at school in the year of 1993, they realised that they had similar ideas and musical taste. Thus, they began playing together and idealizing their band Inearthed which would one day become Children of Bodom. The band released their first demo, Ubiquitous Absence of Remission, which he contributed some keyboards. Jaska played a vital role in the formation of the band, since he was the one who brought both Alexander Kuoppala and Janne Wirman to their line-up. Jaska also provided backing vocals on the songs "Warheart", "Black Widow", and "Children of Bodom" from his band's album, Hatebreeder.

In 2019, Raatikainen, and bandmates Henkka Seppälä and Janne Wirman left Children of Bodom due to issues with band frontman Alexi Laiho's alcohol abuse. At the time, the reasons for their departure from the band were not disclosed, and Children of Bodom soon broke up. Laiho died a year after the band's breakup.

In October 2025, it was announced that Raatikainen would be rejoining Children of Bodom for two reunion shows, titled A Celebration of Music; both shows were held as a tribute to Laiho at the Tavastia Club in Helsinki on 26–27 February 2026. The band has since announced that further activity under the Children of Bodom name was in the works, including celebrating the 30th anniversary of their debut album Something Wild with a series of shows in 2027.

=== Other musical ventures ===
He has also helped quite a few bands when they needed a competent drummer. During Sinergy's 2000 European tour, he replaced Tommi Lillman, who had injured his leg. The problem, however, was that this happened three days before the start of the tour, which meant that Raatikainen had to quickly learn how to play ten of Sinergy's songs. Despite the high degree of difficulty, he managed to perform very well, and fans of both bands enjoyed seeing both Raatikainen and Laiho on stage together with Sinergy. On the Suicide by My Side album's booklet, the band wrote a dedicatory to Raatikainen for, on to their own words, "saving [their] tour".

Raatikainen has also played in Virtuocity and Evemaster albums, but since those are both studio bands, he does not have to worry greatly about Children of Bodom's tour schedule, which already has to be calculated ahead to some extent, due to Laiho's previously active participation in Sinergy.

On the 2002 tribute to Chuck Schuldiner – mastermind of one of the most notable death metal bands of all time, Death – Raatikainen, who is a fan of the band, played a couple of cover songs with Norther. A year later, Raatikainen formed a side project with Norther's guitarist Kristian Ranta entitled Gashouse Garden, which has not yet been signed to any recording label.

=== Acting ===
Raatikainen has had some side projects, some of them unrelated to music. In the year of 2000 he was asked by the director of a popular Finnish soap opera (Siamin Tyttö) to play a special part on it. He played a character named Rauli for three episodes, until the character's death. He did have the chance to show some of his drumwork before that happened, though. According to Raatikainen, he had always dreamed of acting, but does not plan to take his career further.

== Musical style and influences ==
He was influenced by musicians such as Scott Travis of Judas Priest and Mikkey Dee of Motörhead, Scorpions and King Diamond.

== Personal life ==
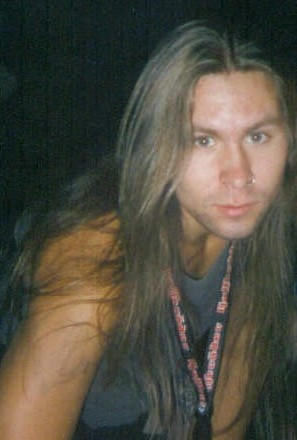
Raatikainen in 2002

Raatikainen has two brothers; Jussi, who plays for numerous professional Finnish metal bands, as well as Julius, who plays for melodic death metal band Kauna. In early 2010, he became the father of a baby girl.

Raatikainen is a quiet and reserved person who spends a lot of time by himself. Most of the time, he stays in single rooms in hotels and generally picks the beds on upper corners while travelling on tour buses. Interviews with him are rare, and despite being one of the founding members, he lets Laiho and Henkka Seppälä do most of the talking.

Although his last name is Raatikainen, he is not related to Finnish guitarist Sami Raatikainen.

== Equipment and sponsorships ==
Up to the recording of the album Hatebreeder, Raatikainen was endorsed by Sonor drums and by Sabian cymbals. He eventually lost the deal with Sonor and for some time played with different drumsets, until settling with Pearl drums in 2003. His drumsticks are custom Millennium II sticks from Promark with his name engraved on them.

Pearl Reference Redline – Piano Black with Black Chrome Hardware
8"x8" Tom Tom
10"x8" Tom Tom
12"x9" Tom Tom
14"x12" Floor Tom
16"x16" Floor Tom
22"x18" Bass Drum x 2
14"x5" Snare

Cymbals
14" Meinl Byzance Traditional Heavy Hi-Hat x2 (both sides)
20" Meinl Mb20 Heavy Ride (left)
8" Meinl Byzance Traditional Splash x2
18" Byzance Brilliant Medium Thin Crash x2
20" Meinl Byzance Traditional Heavy Ride (right)
20" Byzance Brilliant Medium Crash
18" Byzance Brilliant China

Pearl Hardware
DR-503 Icon Rack + PCX-100 and PCX-200 Rack Clamps
H-2000 Eliminator Hi-hat Stand
Pearl Demon Drive Double Pedal
CLH-1000 Closed Hat
S-2000 Snare drum stand
CH-1000 Cymbal Holders
TH-100S Tom Holders
D-220 Roadster Throne

Sticks
Promark Evelyn Glennie 740 drumsticks
