= Stoneage (Stone album) =

Compilation album by Stone
- Released: 1998 (2008 for Stoneage 2.0 re-release)
- Recorded: 1987–1991
- Genre: Thrash metal
- Length: 74:17
- Label: Megamania

Stone chronology
Free (1992)	Stoneage (1998)	Stoneage 2.0 (2008)

Stoneage 2.0

Stoneage is a compilation album by Finnish thrash metal band Stone that was originally released in 1998. It was rereleased under the title Stoneage 2.0 in 2008 and included the bonus track "Symptom of the Universe", a Black Sabbath cover.

== Track listing ==
All songs written by Stone, except for "Symptom of the Universe" by Geezer Butler, Tony Iommi, Ozzy Osbourne and Bill Ward.

No.	Title	Length
1.	"Get Stoned" (from the album Stone)	4:20
2.	"Mad Hatter's Den" (from the album Emotional Playground)	2:39
3.	"White Worms" (from the album Colours)	6:08
4.	"Sweet Dreams" (from the album No Anaesthesia!)	4:27
5.	"Small Tales" (from the album Emotional Playground)	5:27
6.	"Overtake" (from the album Stone)	3:42
7.	"Back to the Stoneage" (from the album No Anaesthesia!)	6:58
8.	"Missionary of Charity" (from the album Emotional Playground)	4:52
9.	"Light Entertainment" (from the album No Anaesthesia!)	5:17
10.	"Real Delusion" (from the album Stone)	4:08
11.	"No Anaesthesia!" (from the album No Anaesthesia!)	10:34
12.	"Stone Cold Soul" (from the album Colours)	5:58
13.	"No Commands" (from the album Stone)	5:43
14.	"Emotional Playground" (from the album Emotional Playground)	3:46
15.	"Symptom of the Universe" (bonus track on Stoneage 2.0; from the "Back to the Stone Age" single)	4:37

== Band members ==
- Janne Joutsenniemi – bass, vocals
- Jiri Jalkanen – guitar (1985–1990)
- Nirri Niiranen – guitar (1990–1992)
- Roope Latvala – guitar
- Pekka Kasari – drums
