= Skeaikit =

Studio album by Angelin tytöt
- Released: 1995
- Genre: Yoik/Folk music
- Length: 39:43 (not including bonus track)
- Label: Mipu Music
- Producer: Kimmo Kajasto

Angelin tytöt chronology
So Fine! (1993)	Skeaikit (1995)	The Voice of the North (1997)

Skeaikit is an album by the Northern Sámi folk music group Angelin tytöt, released in 1995 in Finland. The musical tracks consist mainly of traditional Sámi yoiking mixed with electronic music in some of the songs. The album was recorded in the spring of 1995 by producer Kimmo Kajasto with Art Without Brains Mobile in Kausala, Iitti.

== Track listing ==
1. "Bonkit go johtit" – 2:18
2. "Mouhtačalmmit" – 3:12
3. "Nieida" – 1:10
4. "Guoktelogiovcci" – 1:49
5. "Junná" – 5:10
6. "Báhka beaivi" – 1:46
7. "Silbana Elle Biehtár" – 1:04
8. "Márrat" – 3:45
9. "Giđđa beaivváš" – 5:45
10. "Džááš" – 0:21
11. "Vuoi daid ruđaid" – 2:30
12. "Dolla" – 4:21
13. "Julius Ánde" – 1:30
14. "Guldnasaš" – 7:02
15. [Bonus track – 2:57]
