= Suicide by My Side =

Studio album by Sinergy
- Released: 5 February 2002
- Recorded: August–November 2001
- Genre: Power metal
- Length: 38:08
- Label: Nuclear Blast
- Producer: Fredrik Nordström, Sinergy

Sinergy chronology
To Hell and Back (2000)	Suicide by My Side (2002)

Professional ratings
Review scores
Source	Rating
AllMusic	1.5/5 stars
Sputnikmusic	4/5 stars
Blabbermouth	8/10 stars

Suicide by My Side is the third and final studio album by Finnish/Swedish power metal band Sinergy, released in 2002. It shows a substantial progress in their musical style; singer Kimberly Goss performs in a sharper, more aggressive vocal style, and guitarists Alexi Laiho and Roope Latvala perform more technical solos. Goss has noted that despite the autobiographical nature of the title and the title track's lyrics, as well as suicidal comments made in the music video, she herself has never attempted suicide.

The clip at the beginning of the title track is from the stabbing scene of the film Sid and Nancy, which tells the tragic love story of Sex Pistols bassist Sid Vicious and his toxic lover.

The song "Shadow Island" is inspired by Alone in the Dark: The New Nightmare.

The last song, "Remembrance", is an instrumental dedicated to the people who died during the terrorist attacks on 11 September 2001.

== Track listing ==
No.	Title	Length
1.	"I Spit on Your Grave"	4:03
2.	"The Sin Trade"	3:48
3.	"Violated"	4:07
4.	"Me, Myself, My Enemy"	4:15
5.	"Written in Stone"	4:20
6.	"Nowhere for No One"	3:11
7.	"Passage to the Fourth World"	3:38
8.	"Shadow Island"	5:03
9.	"Suicide by My Side"	3:43
10.	"Remembrance"	1:59

2011 reissue bonus tracks
No.	Title	Length
11.	"Rock You Like a Hurricane" (Scorpions cover)	4:11
12.	"The Number of the Beast" (Iron Maiden cover)	4:32

- Track 12 was previously featured as a bonus track on its original release in Japan.

== Credits ==
- Kimberly Goss – vocals
- Alexi Laiho – guitar, additional vocals (on track 8, 9), spitting (on track 1)
- Roope Latvala – guitar
- Marko Hietala – bass
- Tonmi Lillman – drums
