= To Hell and Back (album) =

Studio album by Sinergy
- Released: 25 July 2000
- Recorded: January–February 2000
- Genre: Power metal
- Length: 41:40
- Label: Nuclear Blast

Sinergy chronology
Beware the Heavens (1999)	To Hell and Back (2000)	Suicide by My Side (2002)

To Hell and Back is the second studio album by Finnish/Swedish power metal band Sinergy, it was released on 25 July 2000. It featured a cover version of "Hanging on the Telephone", originally by The Nerves and made famous by Blondie and the Japanese release bonus track is a cover version of "Invincible", originally by Pat Benatar.

The song "Gallowmere" is inspired by MediEvil.

== Track listing ==
No.	Title	Writer(s)	Length
1.	"The Bitch Is Back"	Kimberly Goss, Alexi Laiho	4:05
2.	"Midnight Madness"	Goss, Laiho, Marko Hietala	4:14
3.	"Lead Us to War"	Goss, Laiho, Roope Latvala	4:13
4.	"Laid to Rest"	Goss	5:40
5.	"Gallowmere"	Goss, Laiho	5:44
6.	"Return to the Fourth World"	Goss, Laiho, Hietala	4:09
7.	"Last Escape"	Goss, Latvala	4:32
8.	"Wake Up in Hell"	Goss, Laiho, Tommi Lillman	6:55
9.	"Hanging on the Telephone"	Jack Lee	2:03

Japanese bonus track
No.	Title	Writer(s)	Length
10.	"Invincible"	Simon Climie, Holly Knight	4:10

Korean bonus tracks
No.	Title	Writer(s)	Length
11.	"Venomous Vixens" (Demo)	Goss, Laiho	3:15
12.	"The Warrior Princess" (Demo)	Goss, Jesper Strömblad, Ronny Milianowicz	4:51
13.	"Razorblade Salvation" (Demo)	Goss, Strömblad	5:00

== Credits ==
- Kimberly Goss - vocals
- Alexi Laiho - guitar
- Roope Latvala - guitar
- Marko Hietala - bass, additional vocals (on track 3 and 7)
- Tommi Lillman - drums
