= Beware the Heavens =

Studio album by Sinergy
- Released: 21 June 1999
- Recorded: October–November 1998
- Studio: Studio Fredman
- Genre: Power metal
- Length: 34:25
- Label: Nuclear Blast
- Producer: Fredrik Nordström

Sinergy chronology
Beware the Heavens (1999)	To Hell and Back (2000)

Professional ratings
Review scores
Source	Rating
AllMusic	3/5 stars

Beware the Heavens is the debut studio album by Finnish/Swedish power metal band Sinergy, released in 1999. The album features two instrumental tracks "Born Unto Fire and Passion" and "Pulsation", and a track inspired by the series Xena: The Warrior Princess, entitled "The Warrior Princess". Some melodies that can be heard in the song "Beware the Heavens" were sampled from a song called "Translucent image" by IneartheD (now known as Children of Bodom); the song is featured on IneartheD's 1995 demo Ubiquitous Absence Of Remission. This is the only album where Jesper Strömblad (In Flames guitarist) plays guitar alongside Alexi Laiho; his position was filled in by Roope Latvala on all subsequent albums.

== Track listing ==
- All lyrics by Kimberly Goss. All music as noted.

No.	Title	Length
1.	"Venomous Vixens (Alexi Laiho)"	3:15
2.	"The Fourth World (Jesper Stromblad)"	4:23
3.	"Born Unto Fire and Passion (Ronny Milianowicz)"	1:46
4.	"The Warrior Princess (Stromblad, Milianowicz)"	4:51
5.	"Beware the Heavens (Laiho)"	3:54
6.	"Razorblade Salvation (Goss, Stromblad)"	4:57
7.	"Swarmed (Laiho, Stromblad, Milianowicz)"	5:25
8.	"Pulsation"	1:45
9.	"Virtual Future (Laiho, Stromblad, Milianowicz)"	4:08

Japanese bonus track
No.	Title	Length
10.	"Beware the Heavens" (Demo version)	3:51

Deluxe edition bonus tracks
No.	Title	Length
11.	"Rock You Like a Hurricane" (Scorpions cover)	4:11
12.	"The Number of the Beast" (Iron Maiden cover)	4:32
13.	"Gimme Gimme Gimme" (ABBA cover)	4:22

== Credits ==
=== Sinergy ===
- Kimberly Goss – vocals, keyboards
- Alexi Laiho – lead guitar, additional vocals (track 2), additional keyboards
- Jesper Strömblad – rhythm guitar, additional keyboards
- Sharlee D'Angelo – bass
- Ronny Milianowicz – drums

=== Other personnel ===
- Fredrik Nordström – production, recording, mixing, additional keyboards
- Göran Finnberg – mastering
