= Stone (Stone album) =

Studio album by Stone
- Released: 1988
- Recorded: December 1987
- Studio: MTV Studios
- Genre: Thrash metal
- Length: 42:40
- Label: Megamania
- Producer: Mikko Karmila, Stone

Stone chronology
Stone (1988)	No Anaesthesia! (1989)

US release cover

Stone is the debut album from Finnish thrash metal band Stone, released in 1988. It was remastered and reissued in 2003, and again in 2009, bundled with No Anaesthesia! in a 2-CD set. Several singles were released from the album, which was released by Mechanic Records for US distribution, while Megamania released it in the band's native country.

== Track listing ==
No.	Title	Writer(s)	Length
1.	"Get Stoned"	Joutsenniemi	4:22
2.	"No Commands"	Joutsenniemi, Latvala	5:44
3.	"Eat Your Pride"	Joutsenniemi, Latvala	4:22
4.	"The Day of Death"	Joutsenniemi, Latvala	3:53
5.	"Reached Out"	Joutsenniemi, Latvala	3:50
6.	"Real Delusion"	Joutsenniemi, Latvala	4:12
7.	"Brain Damage"	Joutsenniemi, Latvala	6:15
8.	"Escape"	Joutsenniemi, Latvala	5:23
9.	"The Final Cuntdown" (Europe cover)	Joey Tempest	0:56
10.	"Overtake"	Joutsenniemi	3:42
11.	"Symptom of the Universe (Black Sabbath cover) [Bonus track]"	(Geezer Butler, Tony Iommi, Ozzy Osbourne and Bill Ward).	4:38
Total length:			47:03

Notes

- On the 2003 re-release, "The Final Cuntdown" is re-titled "The Final Countdown" (the correct title of the song). It is a parody cover of the Europe song "The Final Countdown".
- "No Commands" was covered by Children of Bodom. It can be found on their 2009 covers album Skeletons in the Closet and as a bonus track on some versions of their 1998 album Hatebreeder.

== Singles ==
Three singles were released in support of the album:

- "Real Delusion"/"Day of Death" (1987)
- "Back to the Stone Age"/"Symptom of the Universe" (The latter song being a Black Sabbath cover later made available as a bonus track on the Stoneage 2.0 compilation CD) (1988)
- "Get Stoned"/"No Commands" (as a promo single) (1988)

== Personnel ==
- Janne Joutsenniemi – bass, vocals
- Jiri Jalkanen – guitar
- Roope Latvala – guitar
- Pekka Kasari – drums

Production

- Mikko Karmila – production
