= Not Enough =

Not Enough may refer to:

- "Not Enough", by 3 Doors Down on their album The Better Life
- "Not Enough", by Juliana Hatfield on her album How to Walk Away
- "Not Enough", by Lacuna Coil on their album Shallow Life
- "Not Enough", by Memphis May Fire on their album Unconditional
- "Not Enough", by Our Lady Peace on their album Gravity
- "Not Enough", by Van Halen on their album Balance
- "Not Enough", by Waltari on their album Blood Sample
