= Kylähullut =

Finnish hardcore punk band

- Origin: Finland
- Genres: Hardcore punk, Speed metal
- Years active: 2004–2012
- Label: Kråklund Records
- Past members: Vesku Jokinen; Tonmi Lillman; Alexi Laiho

Kylähullut was a speed metal /punk band from Tampere, Finland. Their song lyrics are written in Finnish, and the band name means Village Idiots in Finnish. Stefan Glas from underground-empire.com described the music on Kylähullut's 2005 album Turpa Täynnä as a combination of "drunk-punk" and "metal'n'roll“. They produced two studio albums, released on Kråklund Records, as well as two EPs. The band was founded in 2003 and broke up in 2012 after the death of drummer Tonmi Lillman.

== History ==
In 2003, guitarist and singer Alexi Laiho (from the band Sinergy, Children of Bodom) and singer Vesa Jokinen (from the band Klamydia) met by chance at the when they were seated at the same table in the restaurant Telakka in Tampere. They began discussing music, and later they wrote their first songs. They met at Laihos's house, along with drummer and bassist Tonmi Lillman, ex-To/Die/For and Lordi and a band colleague from Sinergy, for their only practice session before those songs were recorded. The band was formed as a side project, for the entertainment of the musicians, and took a carefree approach to their music.

In May 2004, the band released their first EP Keisarinleikkaus, which included four songs. The four songs from the EP are also included in their debut album Turpa Täynnä, which was released in January of the next year. This album also includes a cover version of the song Aika written by the band Klamydia. Kimberley Goss, from the band Sinergy, can be heard on the song Kylähullut. On July 30. 2005 Kylähullut gave their first live performance at the Kuopio Rockcock festival in Kuopio.

In 2007 the band released a second EP Lisää Persettä Rättipäille. In the same year, they released their second studio album Peräaukko Sivistyksessä. On February 14, 2012 Tonmi Lillman died at the age of 38 from an illness, and the band broke up.

== Band members ==
Former

- Vesa 'Vesku' Jokinen – Vocals (2004–2012)
- Tonmi Lillman – Drums, Bass (2004–2012; died 2012)
- Alexi Laiho – Guitar, Vocals (2004–2012; died 2020)

== Discography ==
=== Albums ===
- Turpa Täynnä (2005)
- Peräaukko Sivistyksessä (2007)

=== EPs ===
- Keisarinleikkaus (2004)
  A 4-track EP released in 2004. The performers are Alexi Laiho, guitar, vocals; Tonmi Lillman, drums; Vesku Jokinen, vocals
- Lisää Persettä Rättipäille (2007)

== Videos ==
- Kääpiöt - Turpa Täynnä
- Kieli Hanurissa
