= Yeah! Yeah! Die! Die! Death Metal Symphony in Deep C =

Yeah! Yeah! Die! Die! (Death Metal Symphony in Deep C)

Studio album by Waltari
- Released: May 1996
- Recorded: Laryy Place and Yleisradio Music Studios, Helsinki; September – November 1995
- Genre: Symphonic death metal, progressive metal, rock opera
- Length: 55:40
- Label: EMI
- Producer: Mikko Karmila, Waltari and Riku Niemi

Waltari chronology
Big Bang (1995)	Yeah! Yeah! Die! Die! (Death Metal Symphony in Deep C) (1996)	Space Avenue (1997)

Yeah! Yeah! Die! Die! (Death Metal Symphony in Deep C) is the fourth studio album by Finnish band Waltari, combining death metal with classical music. Originally, Yeah! Yeah! Die! Die! was written as a stage show. After the show's premiere performance in 1995 at the Helsinki Music Festival, it was recorded and finally released in May 1996.

== History ==
Yeah! Yeah! Die! Die! was written by Kärtsy Hatakka between 1992 and 1995. By the end of 1994, Hatakka got in contact with Riku Niemi, a Finnish conductor, composer and leader of Avanti! symphony orchestra. After Niemi became involved in the project, Hatakka finalized the work and Niemi arranged it for symphony orchestra. The premiere show was performed by Waltari on 22 August 1995 at the "Taiteiden Yö" festival in Helsinki (Helsinki Music Festival), Finland together with Avanti! symphony orchestra, conducted by Niemi.

After the stage show, Yeah! Yeah! Die! Die! was recorded between September and November 1995, and in May 1996 the album Yeah! Yeah! Die! Die! Death Metal Symphony in Deep C was released in Germany, Austria and Switzerland. Yeah! Yeah! Die! Die! was performed once again in 1997 in Turku, Finland, supported by Turku Symphony Orchestra.

== Content ==
Yeah! Yeah! Die! Die! features the story of John Doe (Kärtsy Hatakka) whose life is being controlled by a central "computer brain" (Tomi Koivusaari). An angel (Eeva-Kaarina Vilke) helps John Doe defeat the computer brain, but without this controlling force John Doe feels lost. He changes his mind and decides to save the computer brain. At the end the libretto says "everybody simply decides to vanish into thin air and disappear into the pages of internet!"

In terms of style, Yeah! Yeah! Die! Die! is quite different from Waltari's regular work. The music is mostly inspired by classical music, and modern elements (not limited to metal) have been added. The album features long passages of purely classical music, inspired by composers such as Beethoven and Sibelius. However, for most of the album, the music varies between "symphony orchestra with a backing death metal band" and "death metal band with a backing orchestra".

== Track listing ==
No.	Title	Length
1.	"Yeah! Yeah! Die! Die! Death Metal Symphony in Deep C": I. "Part 1: Misty Dreariness" (7:40); II. "Part 2: The Sign" (8:33); III. "Part 3: Deeper into the Mud" (4:57); IV."Part 4: The Struggle for Life and Death of 'Knowledge'" (3:35); V. "Part 5: Completely Alone" (12:08); VI. "Part 6: Move" (4:45); VII. "Part 7: Time, Irrelevant" (7:56); VIII. "Part 8: The Top" (6:06)"	55:40
2.	"How Long Can U Go?" (bonus track)	2:35

== Personnel ==
- Kärtsy Hatakka – bass guitar, vocals (Waltari)
- Jariot Lehtinen – guitar (Waltari)
- Sami Yli-Sirniö – additional guitars (Waltari)
- Roope Latvala – guitar (Waltari)
- Janne Parviainen – drums (Waltari)
- Tomi Koivusaari (of Amorphis) – vocals
- Eeva-Kaarina Vilke – vocals
- Kimmo Kajasto – keyboards
- Avanti! symphony orchestra, conducted by Riku Niemi

== Charts ==
Chart (1996)	Peak position
Finnish Albums (Suomen virallinen lista)	23
