= Radium Round =

Studio album by Waltari
- Released: 1999/2000
- Genre: Progressive metal, avant-garde metal, alternative metal, pop rock, rap rock
- Length: 49:47
- Label: Edel Records

Waltari chronology
Space Avenue (1997)	Radium Round (1999)	Rare Species (2004)

Radium Round is the sixth studio album by the Finnish avant-garde metal band Waltari.

== Track listing ==
No.	Title	Length
1.	"Back to the Bottom"	3:56
2.	"Every Bad Day"	3:44
3.	"Broken Bizarre"	3:13
4.	"Power of Thoughts"	4:34
5.	"Atom Angel"	3:50
6.	"Number None"	3:47
7.	"Radium Round"	3:23
8.	"Love Rocket"	4:16
9.	"The Plan"	5:14
10.	"City Neurotic"	4:23
11.	"Scum"	4:46
12.	"4000 Years"	4:37
Total length:		49:47

== Credits ==
- Kärtsy Hatakka – Vocals, bass, programming, keyboards
- Jariot Lehtinen – Guitar, vocals
- Roope Latvala – Guitar
- Janne Parviainen – Drums

== Charts ==
Chart (1999)	Peak position
Finnish Albums (Suomen virallinen lista)	33
