= Space Avenue =

Studio album by Waltari
- Released: 1997
- Genre: Progressive metal; avant-garde metal; alternative metal; industrial metal
- Length: 57:15
- Label: EMI

Waltari chronology
Yeah! Yeah! Die! Die! Death Metal Symphony in Deep C (1996)	Space Avenue (1997)	Radium Round (1999)

Space Avenue is the fifth studio album by the Finnish avant-garde metal band Waltari.

== Track listing ==
No.	Title	Length
1.	"External"	4:57
2.	"Far Away"	4:52
3.	"Wolves On The Street"	4:26
4.	"Progression"	4:03
5.	"Blind Zone"	4:16
6.	"Purify Yourself (feat. Apocalyptica)"	5:21
7.	"Stars (Rauli Somerjoki cover)"	4:26
8.	"Prime Time"	3:57
9.	"Main Stream"	4:01
10.	"Look Out Tonite (feat. Apocalyptica)"	5:56
11.	"Walkin' in the Neon (feat. Anita Davis)"	4:07
12.	"Mad Luxury"	5:53
Total length:		57:15

== Credits ==
- Kärtsy Hatakka – Vocals, bass, programming, keyboards
- Jariot Lehtinen – Guitar, vocals
- Roope Latvala – Guitar
- Janne Parviainen – Drums

== Charts ==
Chart (1997)	Peak position
Austrian Albums (Ö3 Austria)	34
Finnish Albums (Suomen virallinen lista)	5
German Albums (Offizielle Top 100)	88
