= Stone (Finnish band) =

Finnish thrash metal band

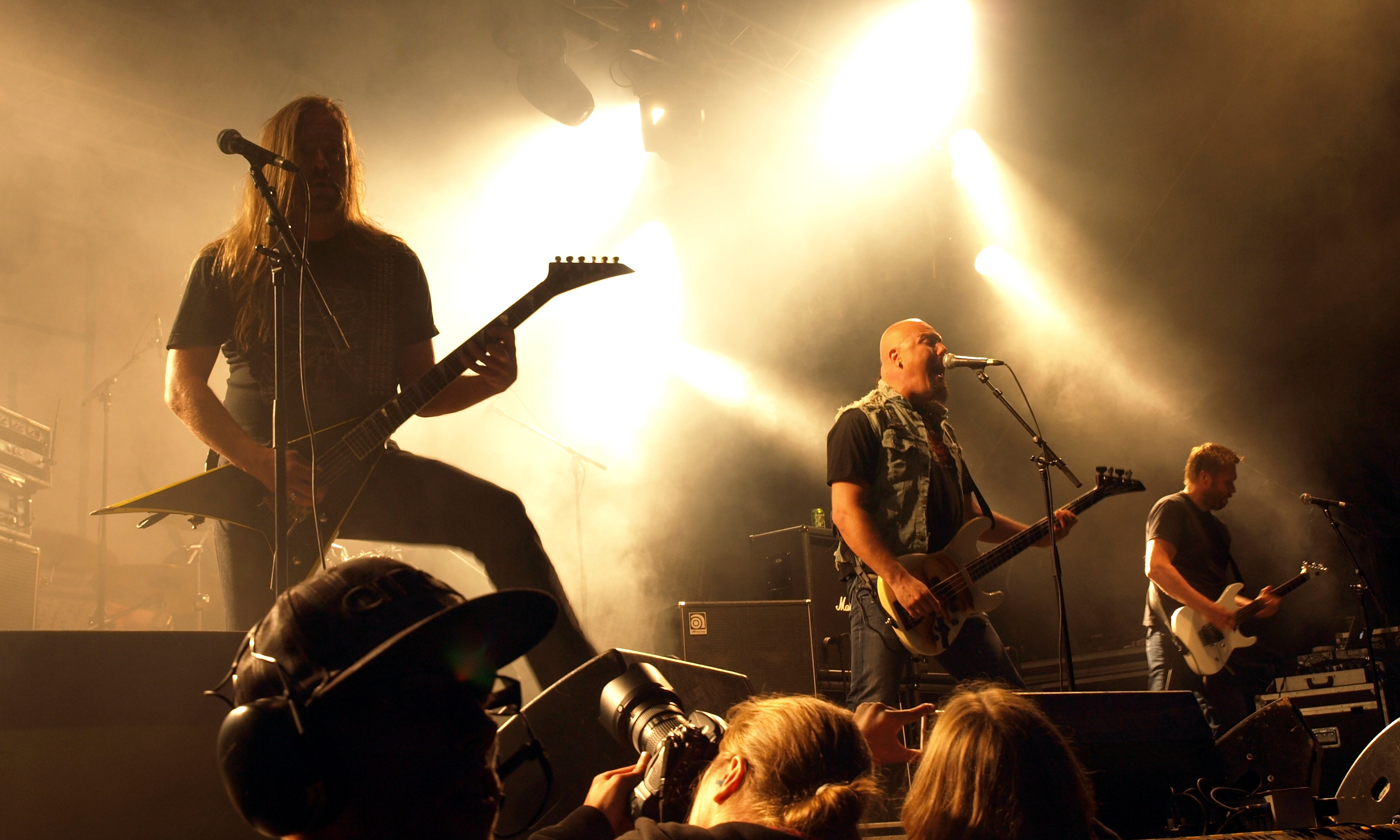
- Stone performing in 2013

Background information
- Origin: Kerava, Finland
- Genres: Thrash metal
- Years active: 1985–1992, 2000, 2008, 2012–present
- Labels: Megamania, Mechanic, Black Mark, Teichiku
- Members: Janne Joutsenniemi; Roope Latvala; Markku "Nirri" Niiranen; Pekka Kasari
- Past members: Jiri Jalkanen

Stone is a Finnish thrash metal band formed in Kerava in 1985. They released four albums and one live album during the late 1980s and early 1990s, before disbanding in 1992 to pursue different musical directions. Stone reunited to play a final set of concerts in 2000, but parted ways again soon afterwards. In 2008, Stone made five "reunion"/comeback appearances. They reunited again in March 2013 for select shows in order to promote their new box set. The band has remained active since then, and they have new material in the works.

Despite their rather short career, Stone's legacy has provided inspiration for many of the countless metal bands who emerged during the popularity explosion of the genre during the 1990s. The band's history and influence on the Finnish metal scene was detailed in the book Stone, published in January 2018.

Children of Bodom lead guitarist Alexi Laiho credits former Stone member Roope Latvala as a major influence on his playing. Latvala himself would later join Children of Bodom as a session player, and eventually as a permanent member, after the departure of Alexander Kuoppala, and also played alongside Laiho in the now defunct Sinergy.

== Members ==
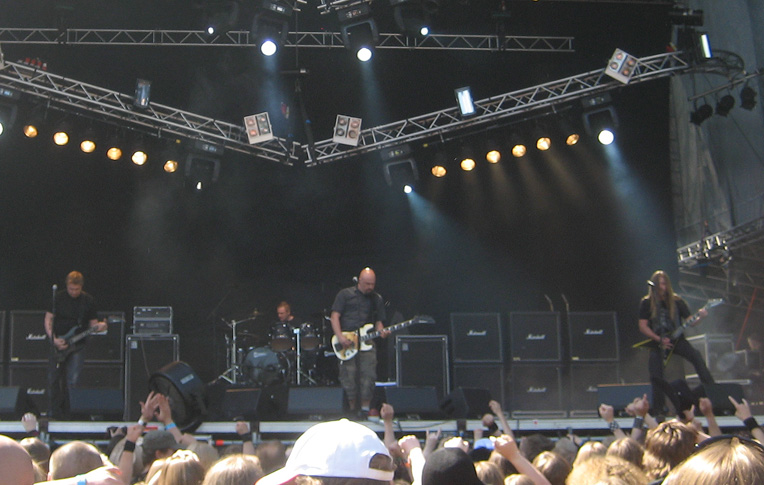
Stone performing in 2008. L-R: Markku Niiranen, Pekka Kasari, Janne Joutsenniemi, Roope Latvala

The band's logo throughout the entirety of their career, present on all albums except 1990's Colours

Current members

- Janne Joutsenniemi – bass, vocals (1985–present)
- Roope Latvala – lead and rhythm guitar (1985–present)
- Pekka Kasari – drums (1985–present)
- Markku Niiranen – lead and rhythm guitar (1990–present)

Former members

- Jiri Jalkanen – lead and rhythm guitar (1985–1990)

== Discography ==
Studio albums

- 1988: Stone
- 1989: No Anaesthesia!
- 1990: Colours
- 1991: Emotional Playground

Live albums

- 1992: Free

Compilation albums

- 1998: Stoneage
- 2008: Stoneage 2.0
- 2013: Complete
- 2018: Light Entertainment – Complete Early Works

DVD

- 2007: Get Stoned, Stay Stoned (DVD)

== Bibliography ==
- Väntänen, Ari (2018). Stone. Helsinki: Like. ISBN 978-952-01-1759-7.
