= Mánnu =

Studio album by Angelit
- Released: May 18, 1999
- Recorded: March–September 1998
- Genre: Yoik/Folk music
- Length: 47:12
- Label: Fazer Records - Finlandia
- Producer: Kimmo Kajasto

Angelit chronology
| The Voice of the North (1997) | Mánnu (1999) | Channel Nordica (2000) |

Mánnu is an album by the Northern Sámi folk music group Angelit, released in 1999 in Finland. The word "Mánnu" means the moon in Northern Sámi. This was the first album of new material they produced after changing their name from Angelin tytöt to Angelit in 1997.

A video recording was made of a live performance of Gárkit.

== Musicians ==
=== Angelit ===
- Tuuni Länsman – vocals, yoiking
- Ursula Länsman – vocals, yoiking

=== Visitors ===
- Mamba Assefa – percussion
- Alfred Häkkinen – guitar, vocals
- Kimmo Kajasto – keyboards, computer programming, producer
- Samuli Kosminen – percussion

== Track listing ==
The eleven tracks are:

1. "Anar Gilli (Inari Village)" – Kimmo Kajasto / Tuuni Länsman – 4:09
2. "Gárkit (Escape)" – Kimmo Kajasto / Tuuni Länsman – 3:31
3. "Cilli Geres (Gossiping Woman)" – Alfred Häkkinen / Kimmo Kajasto / Tuuni Länsman – 3:56
4. "Ruojain Ruoktot (Speeding Home)" – Tuuni Länsman – 2:14
5. "Curvot Mu (Calling Me)" – Kimmo Kajasto / Tuuni Länsman – 6:19
6. "Uldá (Gnome)" – Kimmo Kajasto / Tuuni Länsman – 4:19
7. "Ánne-Kirste Máret (Ánne-Kirste Máret)" – Traditional – 1:48
8. "Reivve (Letter)" – Kimmo Kajasto – 5:09
9. "Inkuna Ganda (Inkuna-Boy)" – Traditional – 3:29
10. "Eatnama Heagga (Earth Spirit)" – Kimmo Kajasto / Tuuni Länsman – 4:55
11. "Mánnu (The Moon)" – Kimmo Kajasto – 7:28
