= Reasons (Angelit album) =

Studio album by Angelit
- Released: 2003
- Genre: Yoik/Folk music
- Length: 51:02
- Label: Warner Music Finland - Finlandia Records
- Producer: Kimmo Kajasto

Angelit chronology
Channel Nordica (2000)	Reasons (2003)

Reasons is an album by the Northern Sámi folk music group Angelit, released in 2003 in Finland. The musical tracks consist mainly of traditional Sámi yoiking with modern electronic soundscapes.

== Track listing ==
The fifteen tracks are:

1. "Ikte" – 0:53
2. "Luovus" – 4:08
3. "Hobo" – 4:27
4. "Buohkain Mis Miella" – 4:21
5. "Doudu" – 3:59
6. "Dajadan" – 4:01
7. "Dongo Dat Ledjet" – 4:45
8. "Otne" – 1:10
9. "Állet Jáhke Su" – 4:24
10. "In Jeara" – 4:51
11. "Luohti" – 0:52
12. "Dollabuollin" – 4:15
13. "Virtualnoaidi" – 6:20
14. "Rukses Ruusu" – 5:13
15. "Ihtin" – 0:21
