= Masturbaatio ilman käsiä =

Studio album by Klamydia
- Released: 1993
- Genre: Punk rock
- Language: Finnish
- Label: Kråklund Records

Klamydia chronology
Pää kiinni painajainen (1992)	Masturbaatio ilman käsiä (1993)	Tippurikvartetti (1994)

Masturbaatio ilman käsiä (Finnish: lit. 'Masturbation without hands') is an 1993 album by Finnish punk band Klamydia, originally released by Kråklund Records. It is the first Klamydia album not originally released in vinyl format. In July 1993, the album entered the Finnish albums chart at its peak position of number 5, with more than 20,000 copies of the album being sold..

== Track listing ==
No.	Title	Length
1.	"Veroparatiisi (Tax Haven)"	2:40
2.	"Just for You"	1:47
3.	"Säähavaintoja (Weather Observations)"	2:02
4.	"Aika (Time)"	1:25
5.	"Kuljukka"	2:22
6.	"Syksy (Autumn)"	2:09
7.	"Kantapään kautta (The Hard Way)"	2:00
8.	"Tosi miäs (Real Man)"	1:57
9.	"Naama puutuu (Face Goes Numb)"	2:19
10.	"Metanol Man (Methanol Man)"	2:32
11.	"Ukko Nooa (Old Noah)"	2:10
12.	"Sementtiin (Into Concrete)"	2:09
13.	"Urheilutapaturma (Sports Accident)"	1:25
14.	"Tätä oli elämäni (This Was My Life)"	1:55
15.	"Jaatinen"	2:10
16.	"Sielun huuto (Cry of the Soul)"	1:58
17.	"Pällistelyä (Staring)"	1:43
18.	"Joiku (Yoik)"	2:37
19.	"Pilke silmäkulmassa (A Twinkle in the Eye)"	1:43
20.	"Nina Autio" (With hidden track)	8:48

== Personnel ==
- Vesa "Vesku" Jokinen – vocals
- Marko "Vuokko" Vuorimaa – guitar
- Jari "Jakke" Helin – bass guitar, backing vocals
- Riku Purtola – drums, backing vocals
