= Säynäväynäviä EP =

Säynäväynäviä-EP

EP by Klamydia
- Released: 1991
- Genre: Punk Rock
- Language: Finnish
- Label: Stupido Twins

Säynäväynäviä is an EP by Finnish punk band Klamydia. It was originally released in 1991 on 7" vinyl by Stupido Twins label. However, similarly with Hihhulit tuloo EP, in 2011, Kråklund Records reissued Los Celibatos album on CD, adding both EPs to the album.

== Track listing ==
1991 Original 7" vinyl release
No.	Title	Length
1.	"Nykyajan Nuoriso (Modern youth)"	1:58
2.	"Viidakkolaulu (Jungle song)"	2:13
3.	"I Still Love You"	2:17
4.	"Mä Lähen Himaan (I'm going home)"	1:42

== Personnel ==
- Vesa "Vesku" Jokinen – vocals, guitar
- Arto Laaksoharju – bass guitar
- Riku Purtola – drums
