= No Anaesthesia! =

Studio album by Stone
- Released: 1989
- Recorded: 1989
- Studio: MTV Studios
- Genre: Thrash metal
- Length: 44:42
- Label: Megamania
- Producer: Mikko Karmila, Stone

Stone chronology
Stone (1988)	No Anaesthesia! (1989)	Colours (1990)

No Anaesthesia! is the second studio album by Finnish thrash metal band Stone, released in 1989. The album marked a slight change in sound from the band's self-titled previous album, incorporating progressive and neoclassical elements that Stone would expand on their subsequent albums, and the title track is notable for being the longest song the band ever recorded. No Anaesthesia! was remastered and re-issued in 2003, and again in 2009, when it was bundled with the preceding album in a 2-CD set. This is also the last Stone album to feature guitarist Jiri Jalkanen, who was fired from the band in 1990 and was replaced by Nirri Niiranen.

== Track listing ==
All lyrics by Janne Joutsenniemi

No.	Title	Writer(s)	Length
1.	"Intro: Finlandia" (Instrumental)	Jean Sibelius	0:53
2.	"Sweet Dreams"	Joutsenniemi, Latvala	4:41
3.	"Empty Corner"	Latvala	6:21
4.	"Back to the Stone Age"	Joutsenniemi, Latvala	6:57
5.	"Concrete Malformation"	Latvala	3:37
6.	"No Anaesthesia"	Joutsenniemi, Latvala	10:33
7.	"Light Entertainment (Good Old Times)"	Latvala	5:17
8.	"Kill the Dead" (Instrumental)	Stone	0:10
9.	"Meat Mincing Machine"	Joutsenniemi, Latvala	6:13
Total length:			44:46

== Personnel ==
Credits adapted from album liner notes

- Janne Joutsenniemi – bass, vocals
- Jiri Jalkanen – guitar
- Roope Latvala – guitar
- Pekka Kasari – drums

Production

- Recorded and mixed at MTV Studios
- Engineered by Jari Laasanen
- Produced by Mikko Karmila and Stone
- Remastered by Mika Jussila at Finnvox Studios
- Cover by Stone and Jari
