= Big Bang (Waltari album) =

Studio album by Waltari
- Released: September 1995
- Genre: Progressive metal, avant-garde metal, alternative metal
- Length: 65:12
- Label: Spin Records, EMI Electrola
- Producer: Mikko Karmila, Waltari

Waltari chronology
So Fine! (1994)	Big Bang (1995)	Yeah! Yeah! Die! Die! Death Metal Symphony in Deep C (1996)

Singles from Big Bang
- 1. "Atmosfear / Feel!" Released: 1995; 2. "The Stage" Released: 1995

Big Bang is the third studio album by the Finnish avant-garde progressive metal band Waltari, released in 1995.

The album produced two singles, both with promotional videos: Atmosfear and The Stage. These singles are two of the three Waltari compositions to reach the top 20 in the Finnish charts. Atmosfear peaked at 6 and The Stage at 15. The album itself reached a high of 7 in the national charts and was their second most successful album.

== Reception ==
At sputnikmusic.com the album received 4.1 out of 5. Allmusic.com also rated it as 4 out of 5. At rateyourmusic.com one reviewer likened them to a poor imitation of Faith No More with only two songs worthy of note. Other reviews are more positive. Overall the most common vote on this site is 4 out of 5.

== Track listing ==
No.	Title	Lyrics	Music	Length
1.	"Big Bang (Dream Avenue)"	Kärtsy Hatakka	Kärtsy Hatakka, Waltari	4:31
2.	"Atmosfear"	Kärtsy Hatakka	Kärtsy Hatakka, Waltari	4:29
3.	"Follow Me Inside"	Kärtsy Hatakka	Kärtsy Hatakka, Sami Yli-Sirniö, Waltari	4:31
4.	"Sensitive Touch"	Kärtsy Hatakka	Jariot Lehtinen, Kärtsy Hatakka, Waltari	3:13
5.	"On My Ice"	Kärtsy Hatakka	Kärtsy Hatakka, Waltari	5:15
6.	"Showtime"	Kärtsy Hatakka	Kärtsy Hatakka, Sami Yli-Sirniö, Waltari	4:28
7.	"Color TV"	Kärtsy Hatakka	Janne Parviainen, Kärtsy Hatakka, Waltari	3:08
8.	"The Stage"	Kärtsy Hatakka	Waltari	5:38
9.	"Jänkhä"	Kärtsy Hatakka	Waltari	4:19
10.	"One in the Line (Your Nature Is Wild Part II)"	Kärtsy Hatakka	Kärtsy Hatakka, Sami Yli-Sirniö, Waltari	5:51
11.	"Feel!"	Kärtsy Hatakka	Kärtsy Hatakka, Waltari	4:45
12.	"Connection"	Kärtsy Hatakka	Kärtsy Hatakka, Waltari	4:50
13.	"Real One"	Kärtsy Hatakka	Jariot Lehtinen, Kärtsy Hatakka, Waltari	4:08
14.	"Let's Get Crucified"	Kärtsy Hatakka	Kärtsy Hatakka	1:39
15.	"Slow Thinking Street"	Kärtsy Hatakka	Kärtsy Hatakka, Waltari	7:10

== Credits ==
- Kärtsy Hatakka – Vocals, Bass, Keyboards
- Jariot Lehtinen – Guitar, vocals
- Sami Yli-Sirniö – Guitar, keyboards, vocals, bass (track 1, 7 and 13).
- Janne Parviainen – Drums

=== Guest Musicians ===
- Aino Roivainen – Vocals (track 3)
- Tomi Koivusaari – Death vocals (track 6)
- Angelin Tytöt – Joiking vocals (track 9)

=== Production ===
- Arranged By Mikko Karmila (track 11), Petri Herranen (track 14), Waltari
- Artwork – Robert Brotherus
- Mastered By – Pauli Saastamoinen
- Photography By [Back Cover] – Sameli Rantanen
- Photography By [Band] – John Vihervä
- Photography By [Booklet] – Esko Kuusisto
- Producer, engineer, Mixed By – Mikko Karmila

== Charts ==
Chart (1995)	Peak position
Finnish Albums (Suomen virallinen lista)	7
German Albums (Offizielle Top 100)	90
