= Vesa Jokinen =

Finnish singer

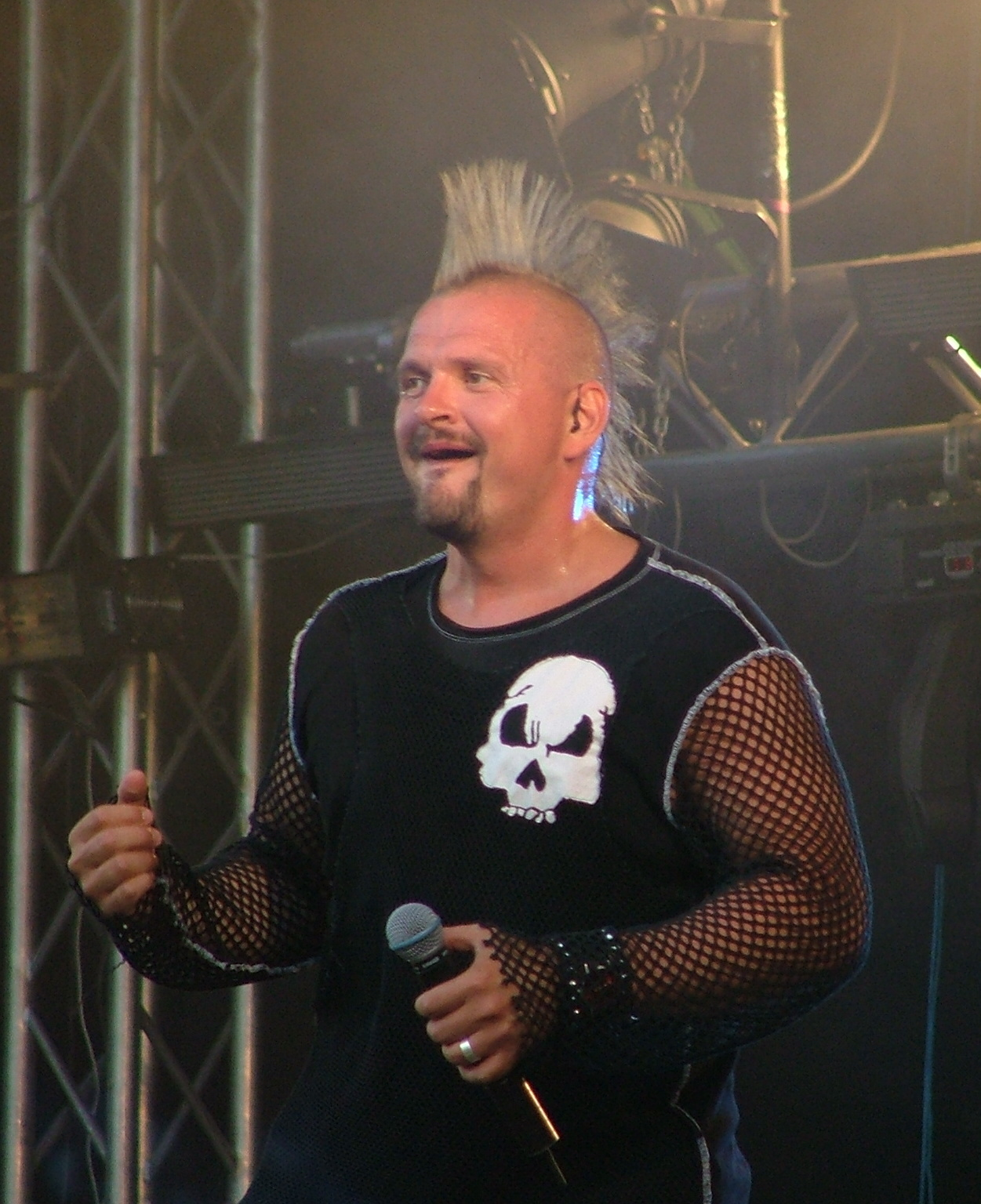
- Singing in band Klamydia during Kuopio Rockcock in 2008

Background information
- Born: 17 February 1970 (age 56); Vaasa, Finland
- Genres: Finnish rock, punk
- Instruments: Vocals, guitar
- Years active: 1998 – present

Vesa Jokinen & Sundin Pojat
- Origin: Finland
- Genres: Finnish rock, punk
- Years active: 2012-present
- Label: Sony Music
- Members: Vesa Jokinen; Sundin Pojat

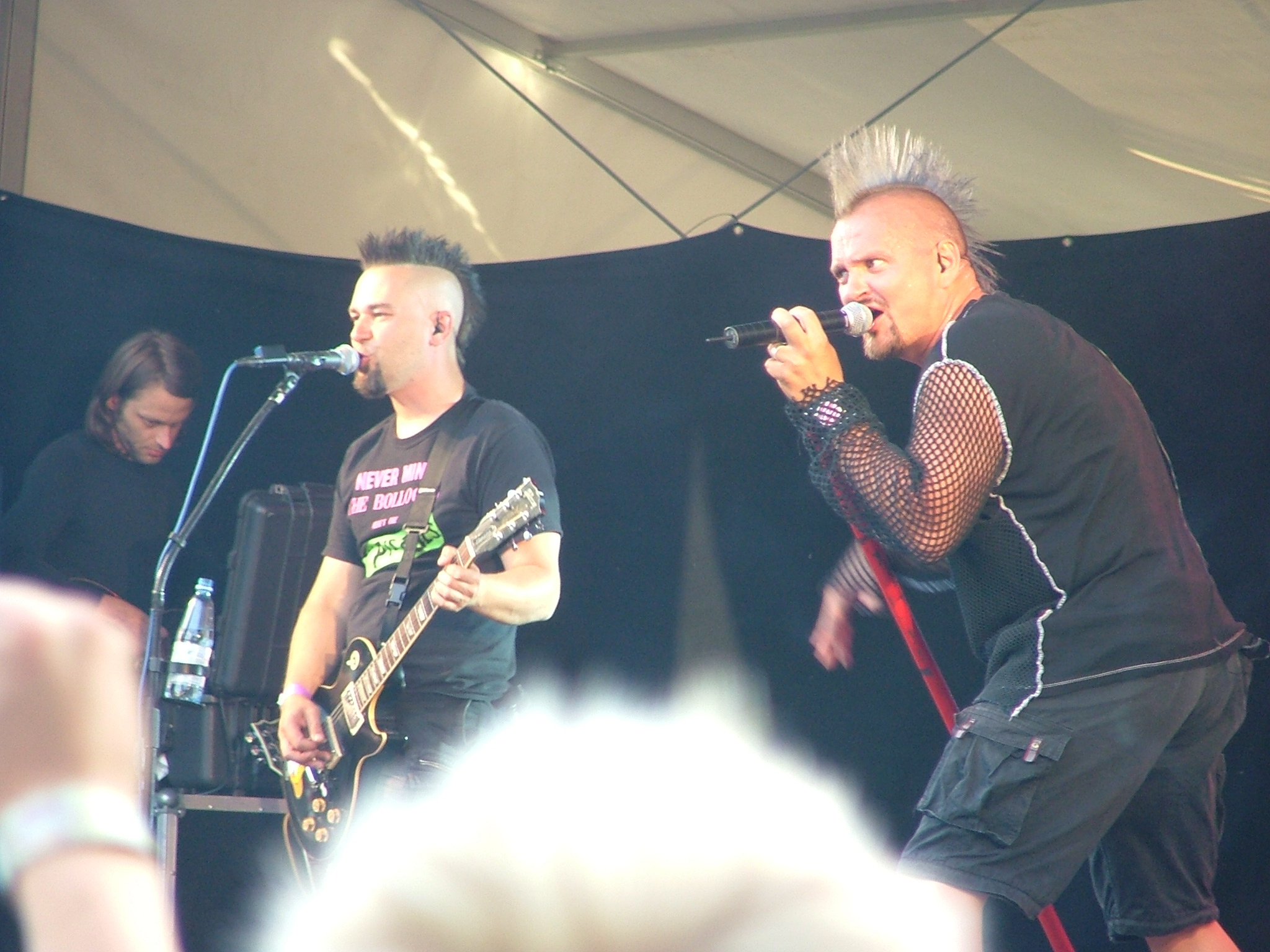
Singing in Finnish punk band Klamydia during Kuopio Rockcock

Vesa "Vesku" Jokinen (born 1970) is the lead singer in Finnish punk rock band Klamydia, based in Vaasa on the Finnish west coast, and in Kylähullut.

He and his friends in the band created the record label Kråklund Records in the beginning of the 1990s because they were unsatisfied with the big record companies.

He has also worked solo releasing the 2000 solo album called Outo Kunnia (meaning Strange honor in English). In 2012, he released a joint album with Sundin Pojat entitled Juuret.

== Discography ==
(Also refer to his discography in bands Klamydia and Kylähullut)

=== Albums ===
Solo

- 2000: Outo kunnia

As Vesa Jokinen & Sundin Pojat

Year	Album	Peak positions	Certification
Year	Album	FIN	Certification
2012	Juuret	8	
2014	Lomalla	2	
