= Below Zero (Waltari album) =

Studio album by Waltari
- Released: 14 October 2009
- Genre: Alternative metal, progressive metal, avant-garde metal, industrial metal
- Length: 44:36
- Label: Stay Heavy Records
- Producer: Waltari

Waltari chronology
Release date (2007)	Below Zero (2009)	Covers All (2011)

Below Zero is the 10th studio album by the Finnish metal band Waltari. A music video was made for the song "In the Cradle".

== Track listing ==
No.	Title	Length
1.	"Below Zero"	5:10
2.	"I Hear Voices"	5:31
3.	"In the Cradle"	3:47
4.	"Without Lies"	4:07
5.	"Dubbed World"	3:57
6.	"Endless Highway"	4:51
7.	"Syntax Error"	4:31
8.	"My Own Satisfaction"	4:13
9.	"10 Reasons Why Not to Hate Me"	4:19
10.	"Travel On"	4:10
Total length:		44:36

== Credits ==
- Kärtsy Hatakka – Vocals, bass, keyboards, programming
- Sami Yli-Sirniö – Guitar
- Jariot Lehtinen – Guitar
- Janne Immonen – Keyboards, programming
- Ville Vehvilainen – Drums
