= Angelit =

Finnish Sámi folk music group

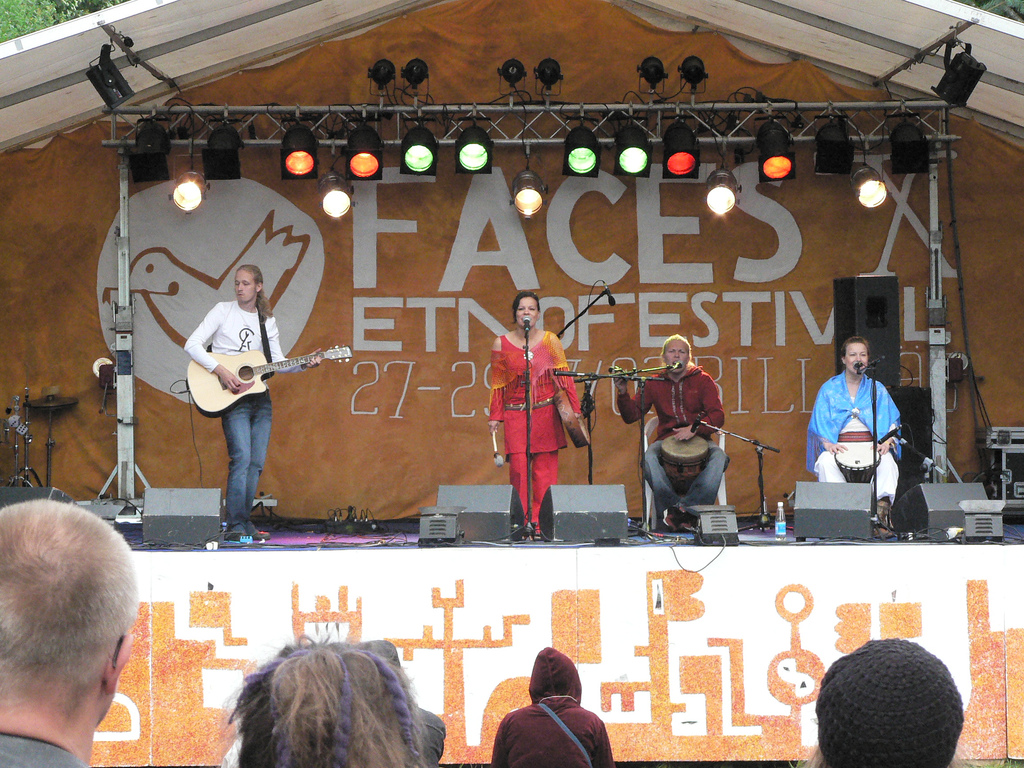
Angelit at Faces X, July 2007

Angelit, formerly known as Angelin tytöt (Aŋŋel nieiddat), is a Finnish Sámi folk music group. Most of their albums were made by the sisters Ursula and Tuuni Länsman. According to National Biography of Finland, the group contributed to awareness of Sámi culture as a living tradition.

== History ==
The history of the group can be traced back to 1982 when Eino Kukkonen, Ursula and Tuuni Länsman's and their cousin Ulla Pirttijärvi's school teacher, took them along with some classmates to sing at a Sámi youth festival held at Utsjoki. In 1987, the group, consisting of five girls and one boy at the time, recorded a Sámi-language Christmas-themed tape Juovllaide together with Norwegian Sámi singer Mari Boine. The group was named Angelin nuoret after Angeli, the village they grew up in, located in Inari in Northern Finland.

In the early 1990s, the group changed its name to Angelin tytöt ("girls of Angeli"). Ursula and Tuuni Länsman, together with Ulla Pirttijärvi, made their first solo album Dolla in 1992. Pirttijärvi left the group soon after its release and began a solo career.

While their first album consisted mostly of traditional joiks, on their second album Giitu (1993) and the following projects the Länsman sisters began using new compositions and lyrics, still influenced by Sámi culture. In 1999, they shortened their name to Angelit. They collaborated with the metal band Waltari and continued making new music until 2003.

According to National Biography of Finland, Angelit was the most popular Sámi band in Finland during 1990s and the early 2000s. The group increased the visibility of Sámi people in popular culture, and contributed to awareness and appreciation of their culture as a living tradition. They also performed in other countries and became known in the world music scene internationally.

== Members ==
- Tuuni Länsman (vocals)
- Ursula Länsman (vocals)
- Alfred Häkkinen (joined in 1994; guitar and drums)
- Samuli Kosminen (joined in 1999; percussion)
- Mamba Assefa (joined in 1999; percussion)
- Kimmo Kajasto (joined in 1996; keyboards, programming, atmospherics)

== Former members ==
- Ulla Pirttijärvi (vocals)
- Jonne Järvelä (from Korpiklaani)

== Discography ==
=== Albums ===
As Angelin tytöt:

- Dolla (Fire, 1992)
- Giitu (Thank you, 1993)
- Skeaikit (Laughter, 1995)
- The Voice of the North (1997) - a compilation of the three previous albums

As Angelit:

- Mánnu (The moon, 1999)
- Reasons (2003)

=== Collaborations ===
All but the Final Fantasy collaboration have been made with the band Waltari.

- Final Fantasy V Dear Friends (1993)
- So Fine! (1994)
- So Fine 2000 (2000)
- Channel Nordica (2000)
