= XXV (Klamydia album) =

Studio album by Klamydia
- Released: 13 September 2013
- Genre: Punk
- Length: 71:58
- Language: Finnish
- Label: The DigiLabel, Supersounds Music

Klamydia chronology
Loputon luokkaretki (2011)	XXV (2013)

Singles from Horns and Halos
- 1. "Älä pelkää" Released: 27 March 2013; 2. "Ripota mun tuhkani Kyröjokeen" Released: 23 August 2013

XXV is a studio album by Finnish punk band Klamydia. It was released on 13 September 2013 by The DigiLabel and Supersounds Music. XXV debuted at number one on the Official Finnish Albums Chart.

== Track listing ==
- Digital download

No.	Title	Length
1.	"Neljä ystävää" (Four Friends)	3:10
2.	"Älä pelkää!" (Don't Be Afraid!)	3:29
3.	"Rahat veteraaneille!" (Money for the Veterans!)	2:44
4.	"Ripota mun tuhkani Kyrönjokeen" (Take My Ashes to Kyrönjoki River)	3:39
5.	"Rakas hullu" (Dear Crazy)	4:26
6.	"Keikkaa pukkaa" (Busy on Tour)	3:16
7.	"Klamydia on perseestä" (Klamydia Sucks)	2:45
8.	"Ruma on kaunis" (Ugly Is Beautiful)	2:49
9.	"Kolmen soinnun maisterit" (Masters of Three Chords)	3:09
10.	"Täit syö ja maailma vihaa" (Lice Are Eating You and the World Hates You)	3:35
11.	"Antti Tuiskun vuosirenkaat" (Annual Rings of Antti Tuisku)	3:02
12.	"Isi haisee rokkenrollilta" (Dad Reeks of Rock 'n' Roll)	3:34
13.	"Werstaan pojat" (Boys of the Workshop)	3:07
14.	"Elämänhalu" (Desire to Live)	3:39
15.	"Surumarssi" (Griefing March)	3:42
16.	"Mitä pyhempi sen pahempi" (The Holier the Worse)	3:00
17.	"Eksyneet" (The Lost Ones)	3:33
18.	"Isi haisee rokkenrollilta" (featuring Francine)	3:45
19.	"Kerran kesässä" (Once a Summer)	4:13
20.	"Tiukkaa satsia" (Tough Stuff)	3:09
21.	"KK (Kuumat kyyneleet)" (HT (Hot Tears))	4:12

== Charts ==
Chart (2013)	Peak position
Finnish Albums (Suomen virallinen lista)	1
