= Emotional Playground =

Studio album by Stone
- Released: 1991
- Recorded: 1990 in MTV Studios & Finnvox Studios
- Genre: Thrash metal
- Length: 46:00
- Label: Megamania
- Producer: Stone

Stone chronology
Colours (1990)	Emotional Playground (1991)	Free (1992)

Emotional Playground is the fourth and final studio album to date by Finnish thrash metal band Stone, released in 1991. While still retaining thrash and progressive influences, this album saw greater experimentation compared to Stone's previous works. It was the first Stone album that was not produced by Mikko Karmila; instead it was produced by the band themselves.

== Track listing ==
No.	Title	Writer(s)	Length
1.	"Small Tales"	Joutsenniemi	5:24
2.	"Home Base"	Joutsenniemi	6:49
3.	"Last Chance"	Joutsenniemi, Latvala	4:44
4.	"Above the Grey Sky"	Joutsenniemi	6:16
5.	"Mad Hatter's Den"	Joutsenniemi	2:39
6.	"Dead End" (CD bonus track)	Latvala, Joutsenniemi	6:00
7.	"Adrift" (Instrumental)	Latvala	1:45
8.	"Haven"	Joutsenniemi, Latvala	4:46
9.	"Years After"	Joutsenniemi, Latvala	5:03
10.	"Time Dive" (CD bonus track)	Joutsenniemi, Niiranen	5:47
11.	"Missionary of Charity"	Joutsenniemi	4:52
12.	"Emotional Playground"	Joutsenniemi	3:42
Total length:			57:48

- "Mad Hatter's Den"/"Emotional Playground" (1991) was released as a promotional single from the album.

== Personnel ==
- Janne Joutsenniemi – bass, vocals
- Nirri Niiranen – guitar
- Roope Latvala – guitar
- Pekka Kasari – drums
