= Rare Species (album) =

Studio album by Waltari
- Released: March 1, 2004
- Genre: Progressive metal, avant-garde metal, alternative metal, hard rock
- Length: 59:32; 71:10 (limited edition)
- Label: Vindauga
- Producer: Waltari

Waltari chronology
| Radium Round (2000) | Rare Species (2004) | Blood Sample (2005) |

Rare Species is the seventh studio album by the Finnish avant-garde metal band Waltari.

== Track listing ==
| No. | Title | Length |
|---|---|---|
| 1. | "One Day" | 4:09 |
| 2. | "Life Without Love" | 3:59 |
| 3. | "Megacity Rain" | 4:49 |
| 4. | "Dreamworld" | 4:09 |
| 5. | "What I Really Know" | 4:30 |
| 6. | "My Pain" | 5:19 |
| 7. | "Quick as a Day" | 4:54 |
| 8. | "Dream" | 5:13 |
| 9. | "Alone" | 5:47 |
| 10. | "Live This!" | 5:21 |
| 11. | "Wasting My Mind" | 4:31 |
| 12. | "No Limit / Your Funky Rhythm / Symphony of Destruction" (medley) | 6:51 |
| Total length: | | 59:32 |

Limited edition bonus tracks
| No. | Title | Length |
|---|---|---|
| 13. | "Guardian Angel" | 3:36 |
| 14. | "Living Then Living Now" | 2:35 |
| 15. | "New Church" | 3:31 |
| 16. | "There's No Tomorrow" | 1:56 |
| Total length: | | 71:10 |

All music by Hatakka–Waltari, lyrics by Hatakka, except No Limit by Wilde/Coster/Slijngaard/Dels and Symphony of Destruction by Dave Mustaine.

No Limit originally performed by 2 Unlimited.

Symphony of Destruction originally performed by Megadeth.

== Credits ==
- Kärtsy Hatakka – Vocals, bass, programming
- Sami Yli-Sirniö – Guitar
- Jariot Lehtinen – Guitar
- Mika Järveläinen – Drums

== Charts ==
| Chart (2004) | Peak position |
|---|---|
| Finnish Albums (Suomen virallinen lista) | 13 |
