= Colours (Stone album) =

Studio album by Stone
- Released: 1990
- Recorded: 1989–1990 in MTV Studios & Finnvox Studios
- Genre: Thrash metal
- Length: 44:13
- Label: Megamania
- Producer: Mikko Karmila, Stone

Stone chronology
No Anaesthesia! (1989)	Colours (1990)	Emotional Playground (1991)

Colours is the third album by Finnish thrash metal band Stone, released in 1990. This is their first album with Nirri Niiranen, replacing original guitarist Jiri Jalkanen, who had been fired from the band just before the recording sessions started. Colours is considered to be more technical and experimental than Stone's first two albums, continuing the elements of progressive that the band had used on its predecessor No Anaesthesia!, and featuring more complexity and mid-paced tempos, as well as longer songs in length. It was remastered and re-issued by Megamania in 2003. The Japanese version had a redder pigment used on the album cover. An EP was released for the album track "Empty Suit".

== Track listing ==
No.	Title	Writer(s)	Length
1.	"Stone Cold Soul"	Joutsenniemi	5:57
2.	"Another Morning"	Latvala, Joutsenniemi	3:10
3.	"White Worms"	Joutsenniemi	6:09
4.	"Empty Suit"	Latvala, Joutsenniemi	6:13
5.	"Spring"	Latvala, Joutsenniemi	5:44
6.	"Storm Inside the Calm"	Latvala, Joutsenniemi	6:01
7.	"Ocean of Sand"	Latvala, Joutsenniemi	4:58
8.	"Meaning of Life"	Joutsenniemi	6:01
9.	"Friends" (bonus track on CD versions, Led Zeppelin cover)	Jimmy Page, Robert Plant	5:31
Total length:			49:49

== Personnel ==
- Janne Joutsenniemi – bass, vocals
- Nirri Niiranen – guitar
- Roope Latvala – guitar
- Pekka Kasari – drums

Additional personnel

- Janne Kannas violin on "White Worms"
- Miika Uuksulainen cello on "White Worms"
- Sennu Laine cello on "White Worms"

Production

- Mikko Karmila – producer

== Empty Suit EP ==
A four-track EP was released for "Empty Suit" in 1990. The A-side contained two tracks from Colours, "Empty Suit" and "Friends", while the B-side contained two live tracks. The live performances on side B were taken from a show in Helsinki on 15 March 1990. This show was guitarist Jiri Jalkanen's final show with Stone before his departure from the band.

Side A
No.	Title	Writer(s)	Length
1.	"Empty Suit"	Latvala, Joutsenniemi	6:13
2.	"Friends" (Led Zeppelin cover)	Jimmy Page, Robert Plant	5:31

Side B
No.	Title	Writer(s)	Length
3.	"Empty Corner" (Live)	Latvala, Joutsenniemi	6:04
4.	"Meat Mincing Machine" (Live)	Joutsenniemi, Latvala	5:46

== Charts ==
Chart (2013)	Peak position
Finnish Albums (Suomen virallinen lista)	14
