= Release Date =

Studio album by Waltari
- Released: February 26, 2007
- Recorded: Seahorse Studios in Hästholmen, Vuosaari, Helsinki and Nosturi, Helsinki, October 2006
- Genre: Progressive metal, avant-garde metal, alternative metal
- Length: 70:50
- Label: Dockyard 1
- Producer: Sami Koivisto, Kärtsy Hatakka

Waltari chronology
Blood Sample (2005)	Release Date (2007)	Below Zero (2009)

Release Date is the ninth studio album by the Finnish avant-garde metal band Waltari.

The track "Spokebone" is a collaboration between Waltari, Tomi Joutsen of Amorphis, and the Finnish folk group Värttinä.

== Track listing ==
No.	Title	Length
1.	"Get Stamped"	4:44
2.	"Big Sleep"	3:55
3.	"Let's Puke Together"	4:06
4.	"Cityshamaani – Night Flight"	7:46
5.	"Cityshamaani – Good Morning"	3:24
6.	"Cityshamaani – Colgate County Showdown"	4:42
7.	"Cityshamaani – The Incarnation Party"	7:17
8.	"Cityshamaani – Sympathy"	13:00
9.	"Hype"	3:29
10.	"THD"	1:52
11.	"Sex in the Biergarten"	4:13
12.	"Wish I Could Heal"	7:37
13.	"Spokebone"	4:45
Total length:		70:50

== Credits ==
- Kärtsy Hatakka – Vocals, bass, programming
- Sami Yli-Sirniö – Guitar
- Jari Lehtinen – Guitar
- Janne Immonen – Keyboards
- Ville Vehviläinen – Drums

=== Guests ===
- Värttinä
- Tomi Joutsen (Amorphis) – Vocals
- Ville Tuomi (Sub-Urban Tribe) – Vocals
- Jan Rechberger (Amorphis) – Programming
- Olli Rantala – Vocals, slap bass
- Vesa Ania – Horn
- Vaasa Lesbian Choir '06

== Charts ==
Chart (2007)	Peak position
Finnish Albums (Suomen virallinen lista)	19
