= Sinergy =

Finnish power metal band

Background information
- Origin: Helsinki, Finland
- Genres: Power metal
- Years active: 1997–2004
- Label: Nuclear Blast
- Past members: Kimberly Goss; Alexi Laiho; Jesper Strömblad; Sharlee D'Angelo; Ronny Milianowicz; Roope Latvala; Marko Hietala; Tonmi Lillman; Janne Parviainen; Lauri Porra

Sinergy was a Finnish/Swedish power metal band started in 1997 by American musician Kimberly Goss. The idea for a "balls-out female-fronted metal band" was first formed when Kimberly Goss of Dimmu Borgir met Jesper Strömblad of In Flames whilst on tour in 1997.

Alexi Laiho's death in 2020 put an end to the possibility of Sinergy ever reuniting.

== History ==
Sinergy formed when the then Dimmu Borgir keyboard player Kimberly Goss met with In Flames guitarist Jesper Strömblad during a joint world tour. They discussed the idea of assembling a female-fronted metal band, but were unable to achieve this due to time constraints.

When Kimberly quit Dimmu Borgir and moved to Sweden, she decided that it was time to turn her project with Strömblad into a reality. The first incarnation of Sinergy was composed of them, bassist Sharlee D'Angelo (from Arch Enemy and Mercyful Fate), drummer Ronny Milianowicz and guitarist Alexi Laiho (from Children of Bodom).

The debut album Beware the Heavens was recorded in 1999 and had a basic concept: returning to the essence of woman-fronted metal bands, throwing aside the operatic elements introduced in the '90s, and bringing back the style of singers such as Doro Pesch (from Doro and Warlock).

The album sold rather well and was received with excitement by European metal fans, but Sinergy was facing serious problems when it came to managing the time its members spent with their main bands. To complicate matters further, Kimberly moved to Finland by the end of the same year, making it difficult for them to meet regularly, with three of the band members residing in Sweden.

Thus, the band was essentially dissolved, but Kimberly and Alexi wanted to continue with the project. They assembled a new line-up, composed of Finnish members only. Roope Latvala (founding member of Stone, one of the bands which started the heavy metal movement in Finland) assumed the position of rhythm guitarist, Marko Hietala (from Tarot) became the bassist and Tonmi Lillman was chosen as the new drummer.

This line-up recorded To Hell and Back and subsequently toured with Nightwish. By that time, Sinergy was starting to receive world recognition. This tour was included on Nightwish's DVD release of From Wishes to Eternity, during which band members played a practical joke in which a selection of support musicians made their way on stage pretending to be Nightwish. Marko Hietala filled the role of Nightwish's bassist Sami, who he was to replace on their next album.

Soon after the recording of the third album Lillman left the band. He was soon replaced by Barathrum drummer Janne Parviainen. Bassist Marko left the band shortly after, presumably due to his Nightwish commitments. The position was eventually given to Lauri Porra from the metal band Warmen.

A fourth Sinergy album, Sins of the Past, began production in 2004, but due to Children of Bodom's busy schedule, the album was never completed. In 2007 Roope Latvala performed a song with bassist Lauri Porra and drummer Janne Parviainen for the album "Guitar Heroes" featuring some of Finland's leading guitarists. Latvala stated that he had originally written the song for Sins of the Past. According to Laiho, Sinergy has disbanded and is no longer an active music project.

Former drummer Tonmi Lillman died on 13 February 2012 after an illness.

In January 2021, it was announced that Laiho died of long-term health complications, and Hietala announced his temporary withdrawal from the public eye and departure from Nightwish, his main band since his departure from Sinergy, who has since returned to performing.

== Band members ==
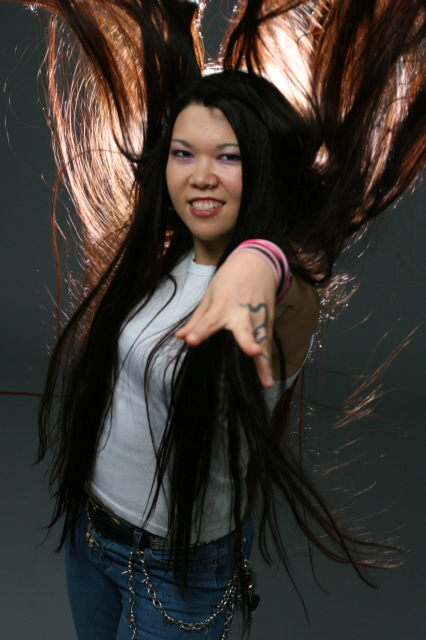
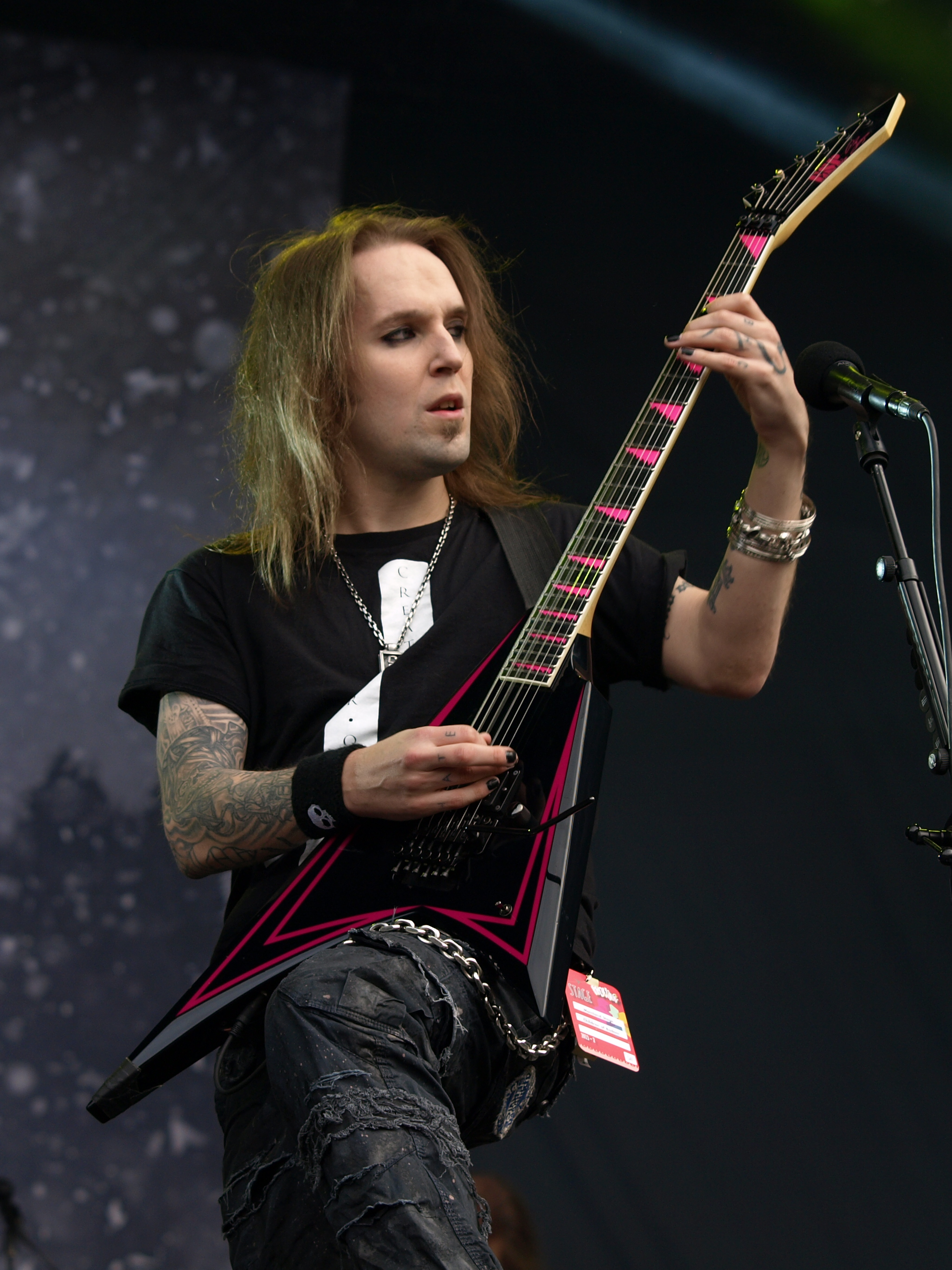
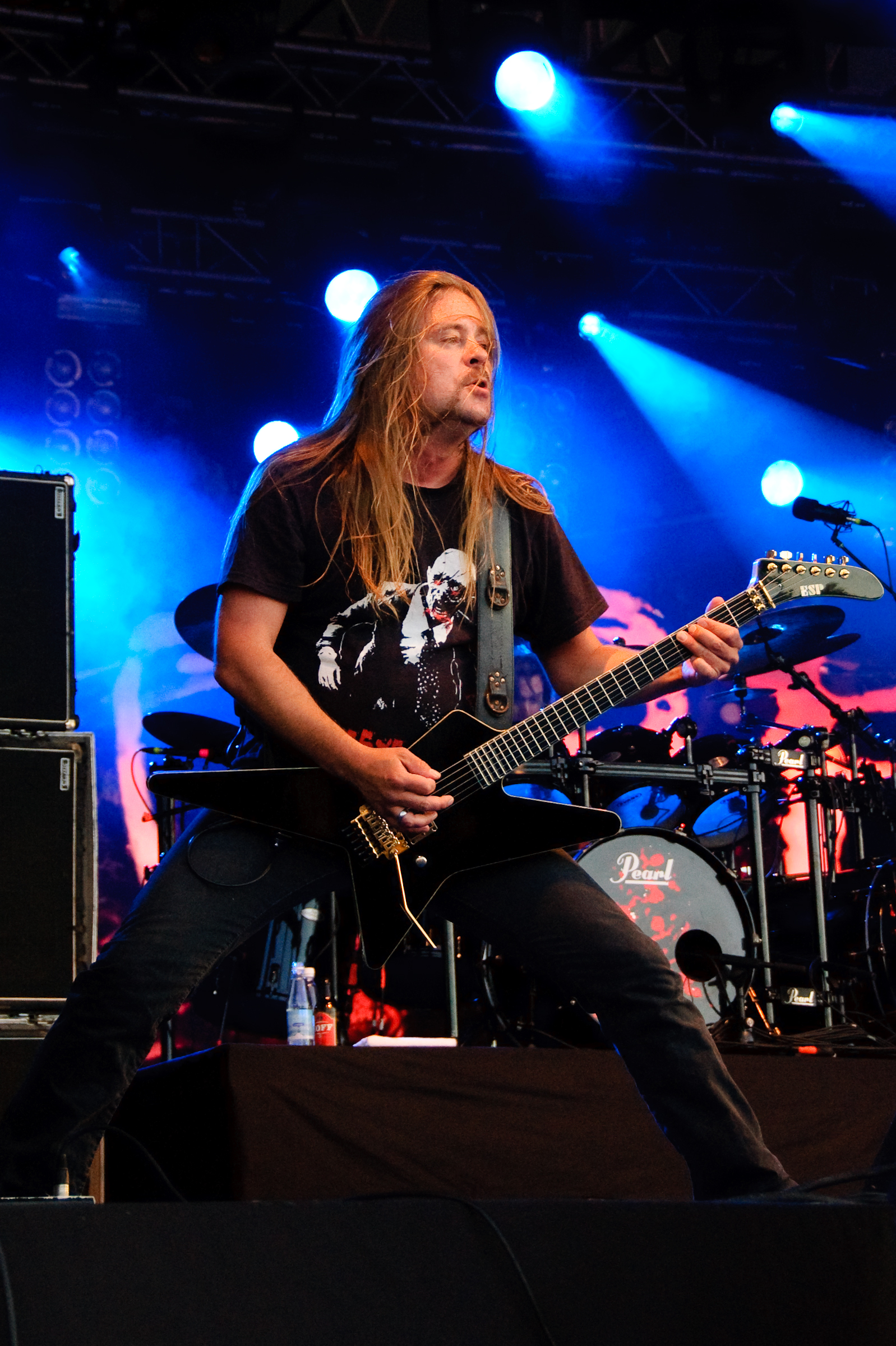
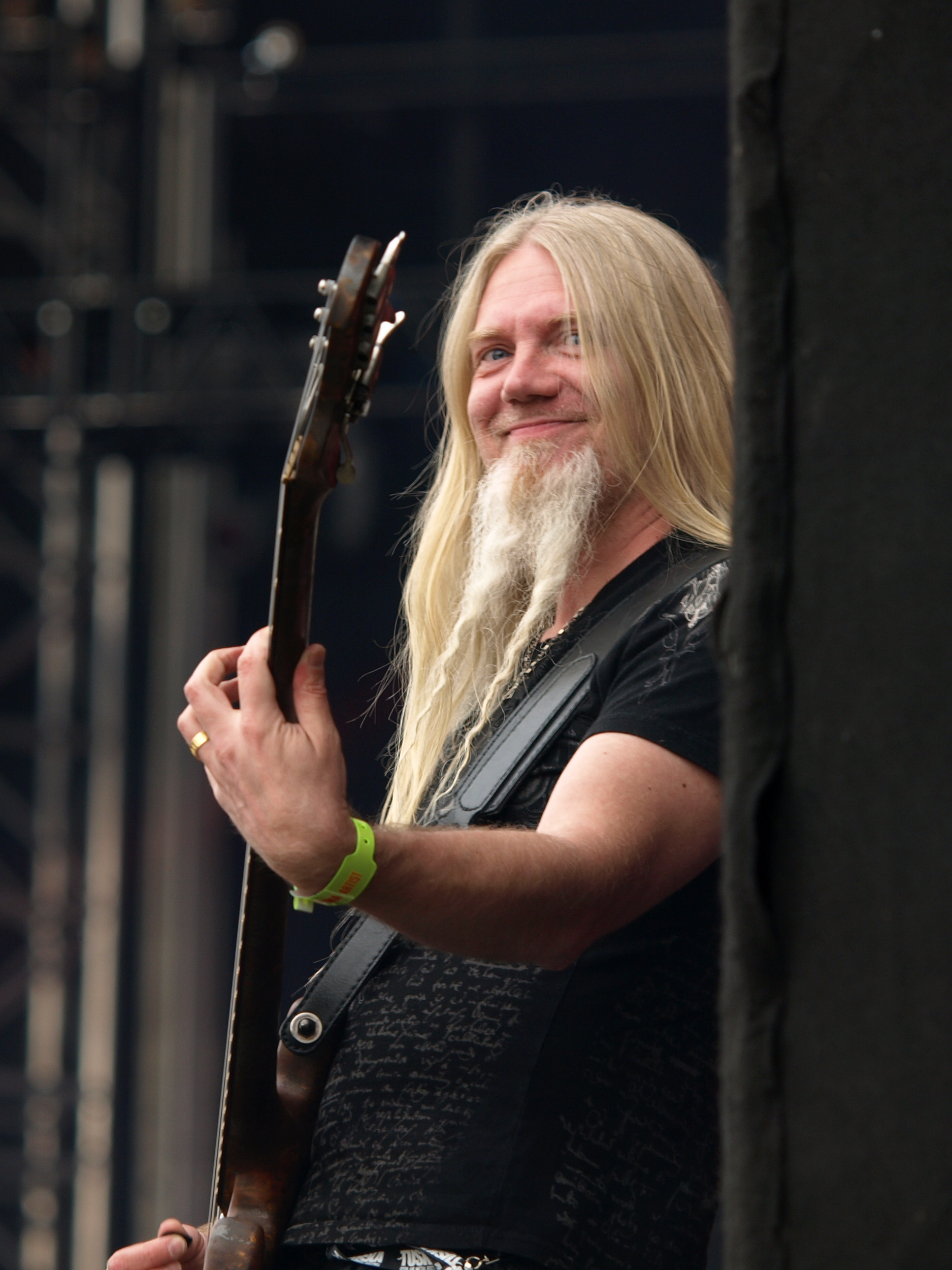
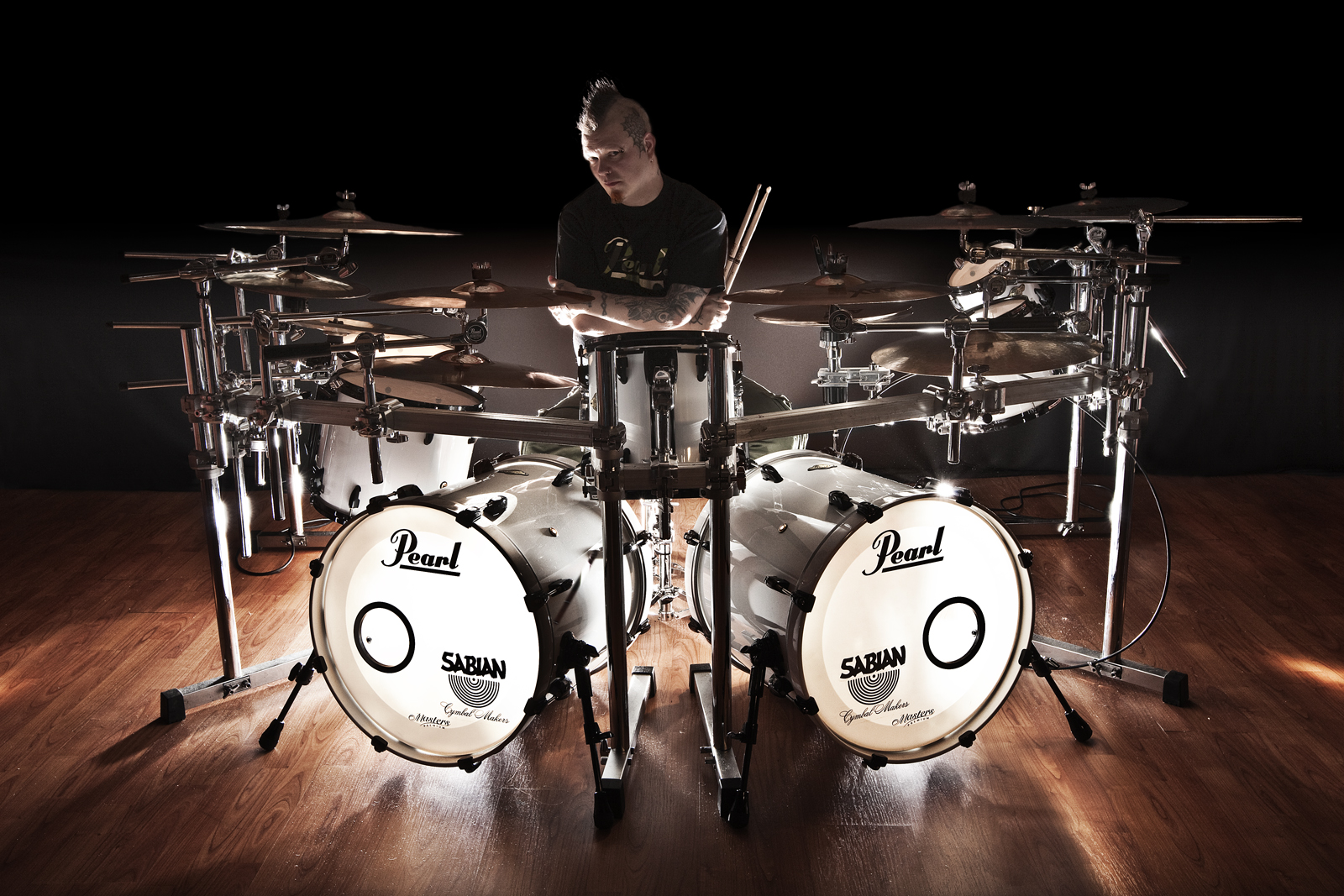
The five main members on the last two Sinergy albums. From left to right: Kimberly Goss, Alexi Laiho, Roope Latvala, Marko Hietala, and Tonmi Lillman.

Final lineup

- Kimberly "Kim" Goss – lead vocals, keyboards (1997–2004)
- Alexi Laiho – lead guitar, backing vocals (1997–2004; died 2020)
- Roope Latvala – rhythm guitar (1999–2004)
- Janne Parviainen – drums (2002–2004)

Former

- Jesper Strömblad – rhythm guitar, keyboards (1997–1999)
- Sharlee D'Angelo – bass (1997–1999)
- Ronny Milianowicz – drums (1997–1999)
- Marko Hietala – bass, backing vocals (1999–2002)
- Tonmi Lillman – drums (1999–2002; died 2012)

Touring

- Erna Siikavirta – keyboards (1999)
- Jaska Raatikainen – drums (2000)
- Peter Huss – rhythm guitar (1999)

Timeline

== Discography ==
Studio albums

- Beware the Heavens (1999)
- To Hell and Back (2000)
- Suicide by My Side (2002)
