= The Voice of the North =

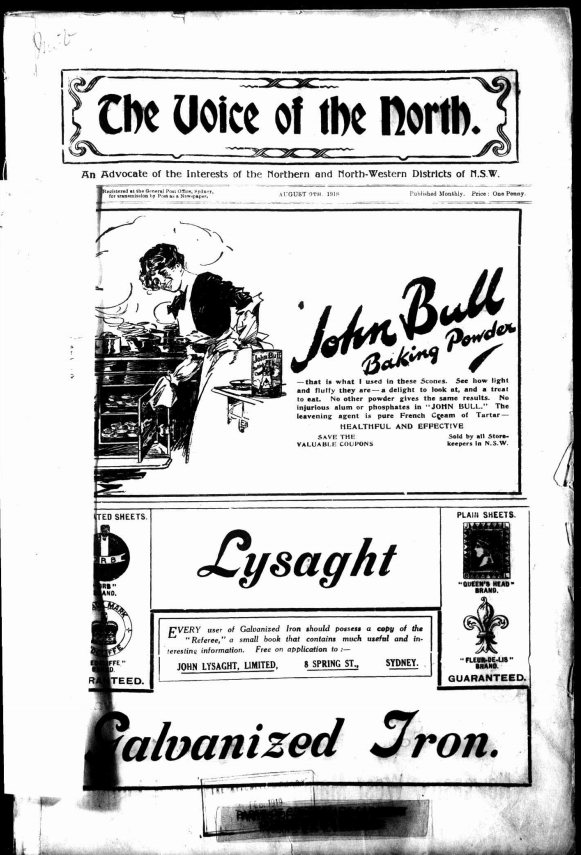
Voice of the North 9 August 1918

The Voice of the North was a newspaper published in Newcastle, New South Wales, Australia from 1910 to May 1933.

== History ==
The Voice of the North was first published in 1910 by David Cohen & Co. The Voice of the North was published monthly, with the tagline An advocate of the interests of the Northern and North-Western districts of N.S.W.

Describing their policy, The Voice of the North claimed to have "consistently advocated for everything which could make for the advancement of the Commonwealth and the welfare and happiness of its citizens". The newspaper's own claim was that it was "printed with the sole object of presenting the views of the people with no axe to grind, and without any thought of profit" and that it "fought consistently for the interests of the people of the northern part of the State, and also for the rights of the citizens of the State as a whole".

== Digitisation ==
The paper has been digitised as part of the Australian Newspapers Digitisation Program project of the National Library of Australia.

== See also ==
- List of newspapers in Australia
- List of newspapers in New South Wales
