= Blood Sample =

Studio album by Waltari
- Released: 21 September 2005
- Genre: Progressive metal, avant-garde metal, alternative metal, hard rock
- Length: 78:45
- Label: Bluelight Records
- Producer: Waltari

Waltari chronology
Rare Species (2004)	Blood Sample (2005)	Release Date (2007)

Blood Sample is the eighth studio album by the Finnish avant-garde metal band Waltari.

== Track listing ==
No.	Title	Lyrics	Music	Length
1.	"Helsinki"			5:53
2.	"Not Enough"			3:35
3.	"Too Much Emptiness"			2:30
4.	"Never"			4:01
5.	"New York"			3:48
6.	"I'm in Pain"			4:38
7.	"All Roads Will Lead to Rome"			3:58
8.	"Digging Inside"			8:00
9.	"Fly Into the Light"			4:34
10.	"Shades to Grace"			4:57
11.	"Aching Eyes"			5:41
12.	"Back to the Audio"			7:38
13.	"Pigeons"			5:16
14.	"Exterminator Warheads"			2:01
15.	"Darling Boy"			4:23
16.	"Wide Awake"			5:00
17.	"Julia (cover from The Beatles)"	John Lennon	Lennon–McCartney	2:52
Total length:				78:45

"Digging Inside" ends at 7:00 and is followed by a minute of silence.

== Credits ==
- Kärtsy Hatakka – Vocals, bass, Keyboards
- Sami Yli-Sirniö – Guitar
- Jari Lehtinen – Guitar
- Ville Vehviläinen – Drums

== Charts ==
Chart (2005)	Peak position
Finnish Albums (Suomen virallinen lista)	30
