= Klamydia =

Finnish punk rock band

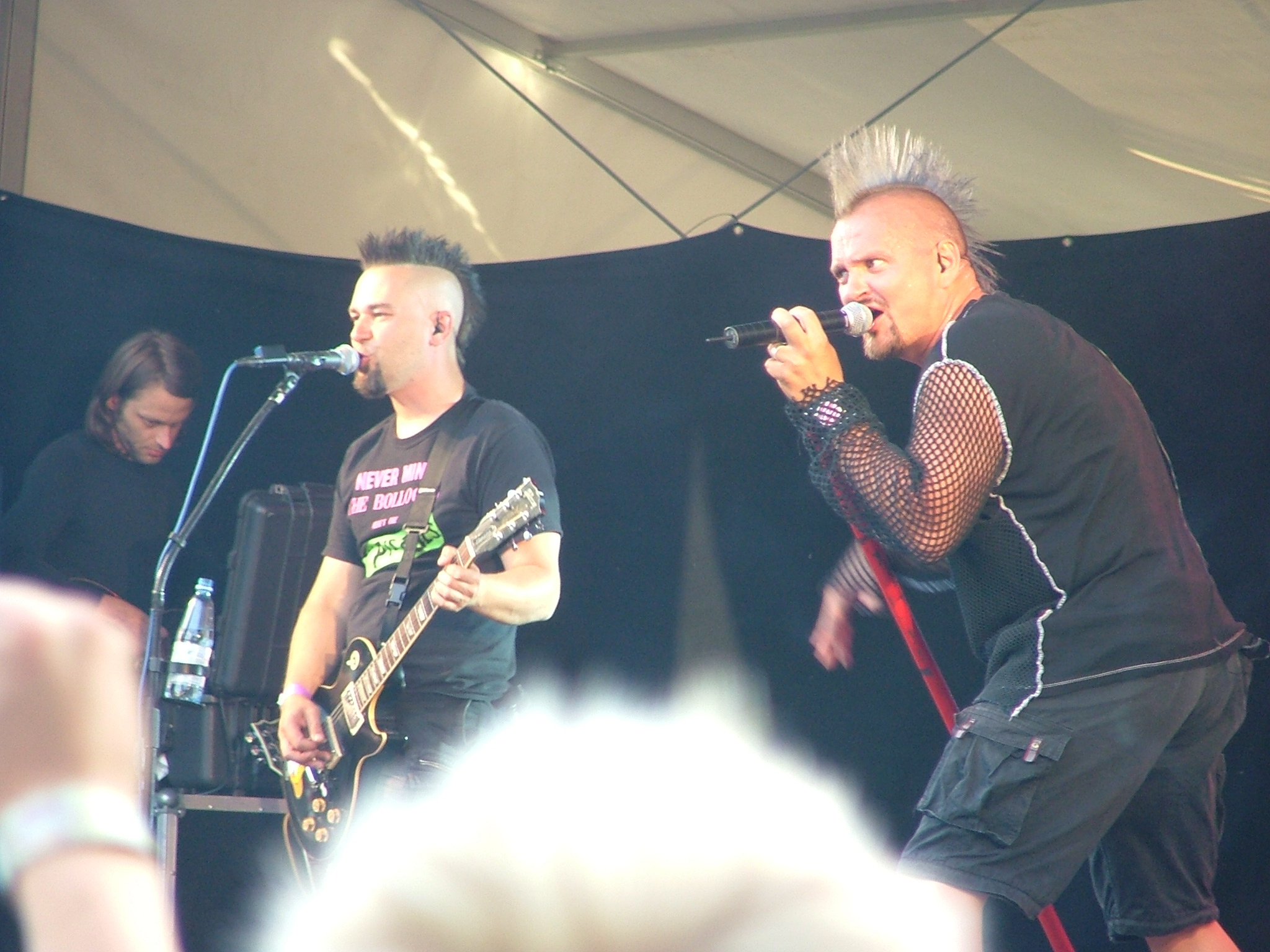
- Klamydia performing at Kuopio Rockcock 2008

Background information
- Origin: Vaasa, Finland
- Genre: Punk rock
- Years active: 1988–present
- Label: Kråklund Records
- Members: Vesku Jokinen; Jari Helin; Sami Kohtamäki; Riku Purtola
- Past members: Hannu Viinamäki, bass (1995-2000)
- Website: klamydia.fi

Klamydia (Finnish: Chlamydia) is a Finnish punk rock band from Vaasa, Finland. The band's name was chosen because it was the worst name that came to their minds.

== History ==
The band was formed in 1988, and has been continuously active since then. The band publishes records in very short intervals (about one LP per year), and has experienced many line-up changes. The only remaining original member is the current vocalist, Vesa "Vesku" Jokinen. The band is notable for founding its own record company, Kråklund Records.

Klamydia has always styled itself as a band that uses humor to criticize society, despite also having songs which cover more serious topics such as youth, incest, and love. In the year 2001, Klamydia was awarded a culture prize by the city of Vaasa. The band utilized the resulting backlash as free promotion. Klamydia has also gained popularity in Germany, where they have toured and released records.

== Discography ==
=== Albums ===
==== Studio albums ====
- Älpee (1989), CD-version named Ceedee (1992)
- Los celibatos (1991)
- Pää kiinni painajainen (1992)
- Masturbaatio ilman käsiä (1993)
- Tippurikvartetti (1994)
- Siittiöt sotapolulla (1995)
- Klamysutra (1996)
- Tango delirium (1997)
- Zulupohjalta (1999)
- Klamytapit (2001)
- Punktsipum (2002)
- Urpojugend (2004)
- Tyhmyyden ylistys (2005)
- Klamydia (2007)
- Rujoa taidetta (2009)
- Loputon luokkaretki (2011)
- XXV (2013)
- Antisupersankarit (2016)
- Aikuisilta kielletty (2018)
- Hiljainen pöytä läheltä orkesteria (2021)
- Mörkö koneistossa (2025)

==== Split albums ====
- Split LP (Split with Die Schwarzen Schafen) (1995)
- Kipsi (Split with Die Lokalmatadore) (1996)

==== Live albums ====
- Kötinää (1994)
- Himmelachtungperkele
- ...ja käsi käy
- Punksinfonia
- Timanttinen keikka, hemmot

=== EPs ===
- Heja grabbar (1989)
- Ja tauti leviää (1989)
- Heppi keippi (1989)
- DSS (1990)
- Säynäväynäviä (1991)
- Hihhulit tuloo (1991)
- I really hate you (1991)
- Lahja (1992)
- Huono (1993)
- Huipulla tuulee (1994)
- L.A.M.F. (1995)
- Perseeseen (1997)
- Onnesta soikeena (1998)
- Snapsin paikka (2000)
- Ryssä mun leipääni syö(2000)
- Ookko tehny lenkkiä? (2002)
- Suomi on sun (2002)
- Seokset (2003)
- Ne jää jotka jää (2007)
- Miljoonan kilsan tennarit (2009)
- Kingi ja kuusipuu (2017)
- Näsinneula näkyy (2022)

=== Collections ===
- Tres hombres (1991)
- Lahjattomat (1996)
- Klamytologia (1998)
- Piikkinä lihassa (2003)
- Jubelium! (2009)
- Sound Pack 2CD+DVD

=== Singles ===
- "Huipulla tuulee" (1994)
- "Arvon (lisäveron) mekin ansaitsemme" (1995)
- "Saksaan" (1995)
- "Narkkarirakkautta" (1995)
- "Pala rauhaa" (1996)
- "Perseeseen" (1997)
- "Kosketus" (1997)
- "Onnesta soikeena" (1998)
- "Letoisa Lewinsky" (1999)
- "Snapsin paikka" (2000)
- "Ryssä mun leipääni syö" (2000)
- "Koomikko tahtomattaan" (2001)
- "Ookko tehny lenkkiä?" (2002)
- "Suomi on sun" (2002)
- "Seokset" (2003)
- "Kujanjuoksu" (2003)
- "Promillepuheluita" (online single, 2005)
- "Pienen pojan elämää" (2005)
- "Lohikäärme Puff" (2005)
- "Pohjanmaalla" (online single, 2007)
- Jalat suorana
- "Ne jää jotka jää" (2007)
- "Rujoa taidetta" (online single, 2008)
- "Miljoonan kilsan tennarit" (2009)
- "Haaveet elättää" (2010)
- "Suomalainen tarina" (2011)
- "Pelasta" (radio single, 2011)
- "Kaikki hyvä" (radio single, 2011)
- Poika pysyy suomessa
- Älä pelkää
- Ripota mun tuhkani Kyrönjokeen
- Rakas hullu
- Isi haisee rokkenrollilta
- Tervetuloa helvettiin
- Pyyntö
- Känni-ääliön paluu
- Älä peitä mun aurinkoo
- Koomikon kyyneleet
- Saappaat jalassa
- Fittihitti
- Kingi ja kuusipuu
- Sotaa vai rakkautta
- Sääntö-Suomi
- Iso I
- Se on koronaa
- Joulu piritalossa
- Outo aika
- Sydämessä mukana
- Pieni suuri elämä
- Muuttumaton

=== DVDs ===
- Chlamydia Rockperry Live 2003 (2003)
- Mist Pipe (2008)

== Videography ==
- "Oodi hietskulle"
- "Pilke silmäkulmassa"
- "Pala rauhaa"
- "Sytkäri"
- "Kosketus"
- "Laiskat ja pulskeat"
- "Negatiivisemman ajattelun ryhmä"
- "Ookko tehny lenkkiä?"
- "Eihän euroviisuihin?"
- "Pienen pojan elämää"
- "Pohjanmaalla"
- "Rujoa taidetta"
- "Ajolähtö"
- "Ota vaatteet pois"
- "Pienen pojan elämää"
- "Puutavaraa"
- "Huipulla tuulee"
- "Ajetaan aaveet pois"
- "Suomalainen tarina"
- "Pelasta !"
- "Pyyntö"

== Gallery ==
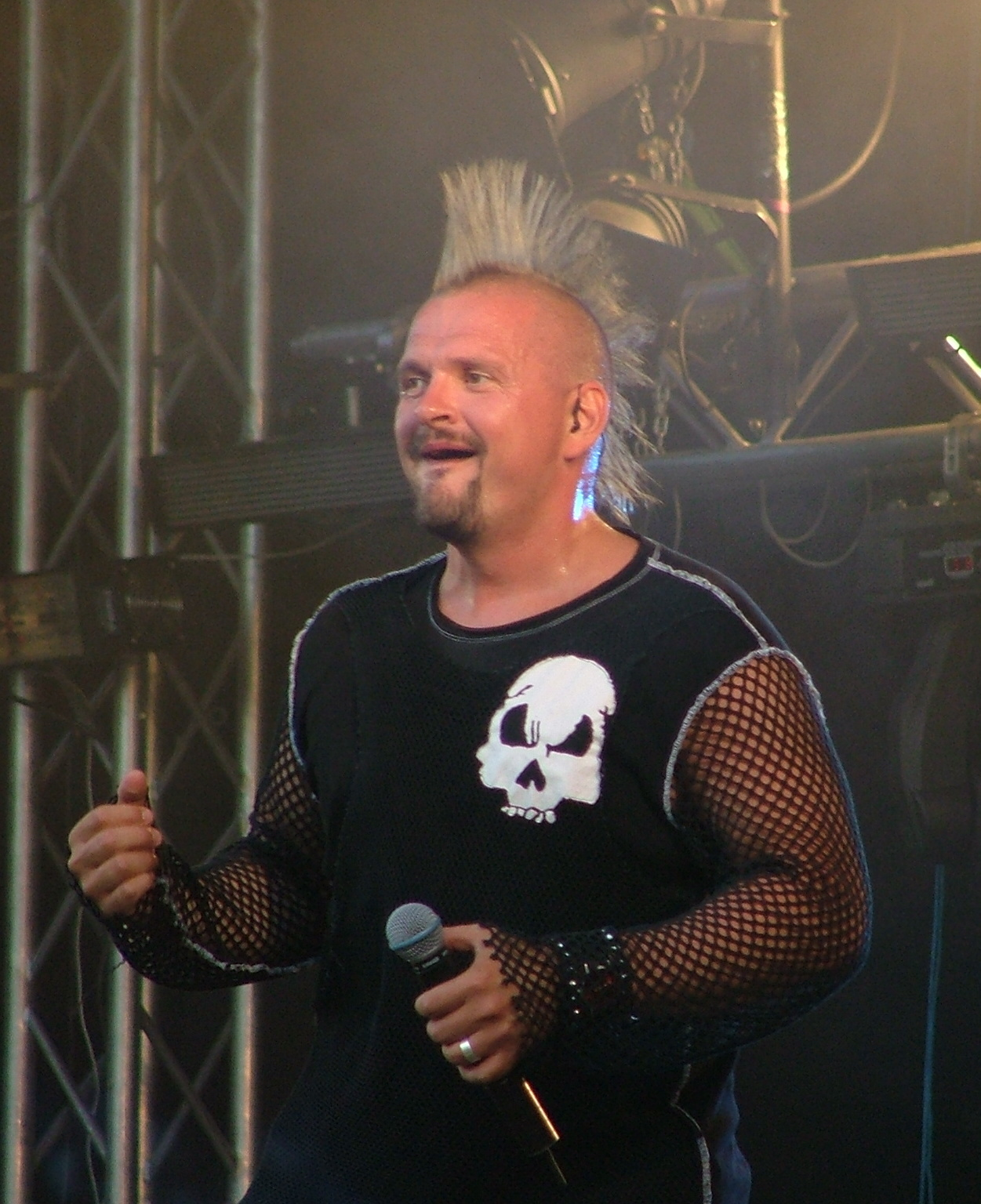
Vesa "Vesku" Jokinen (vocals)

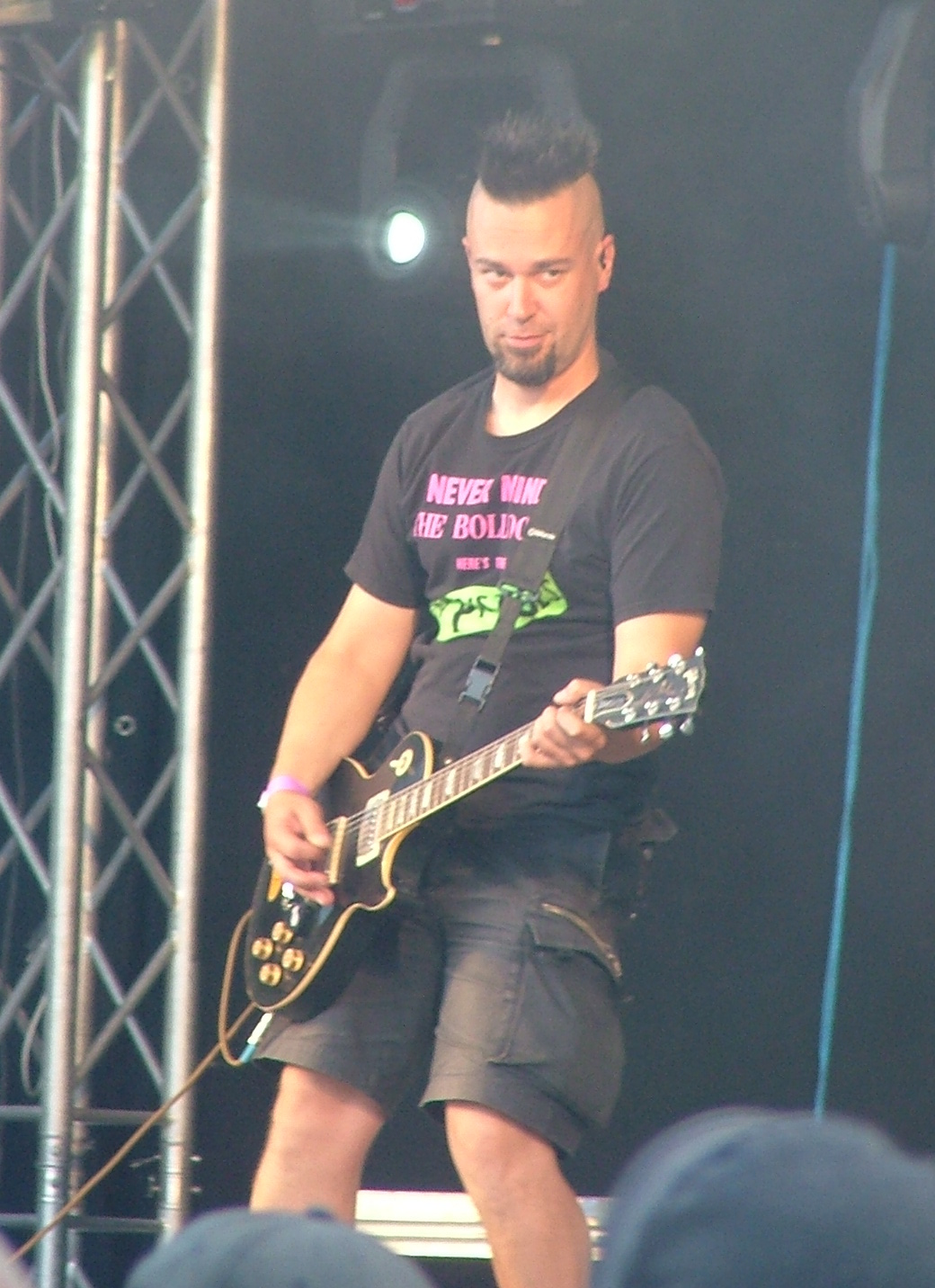
Jari "Jakke" / "Shitsi" Helin (guitar)

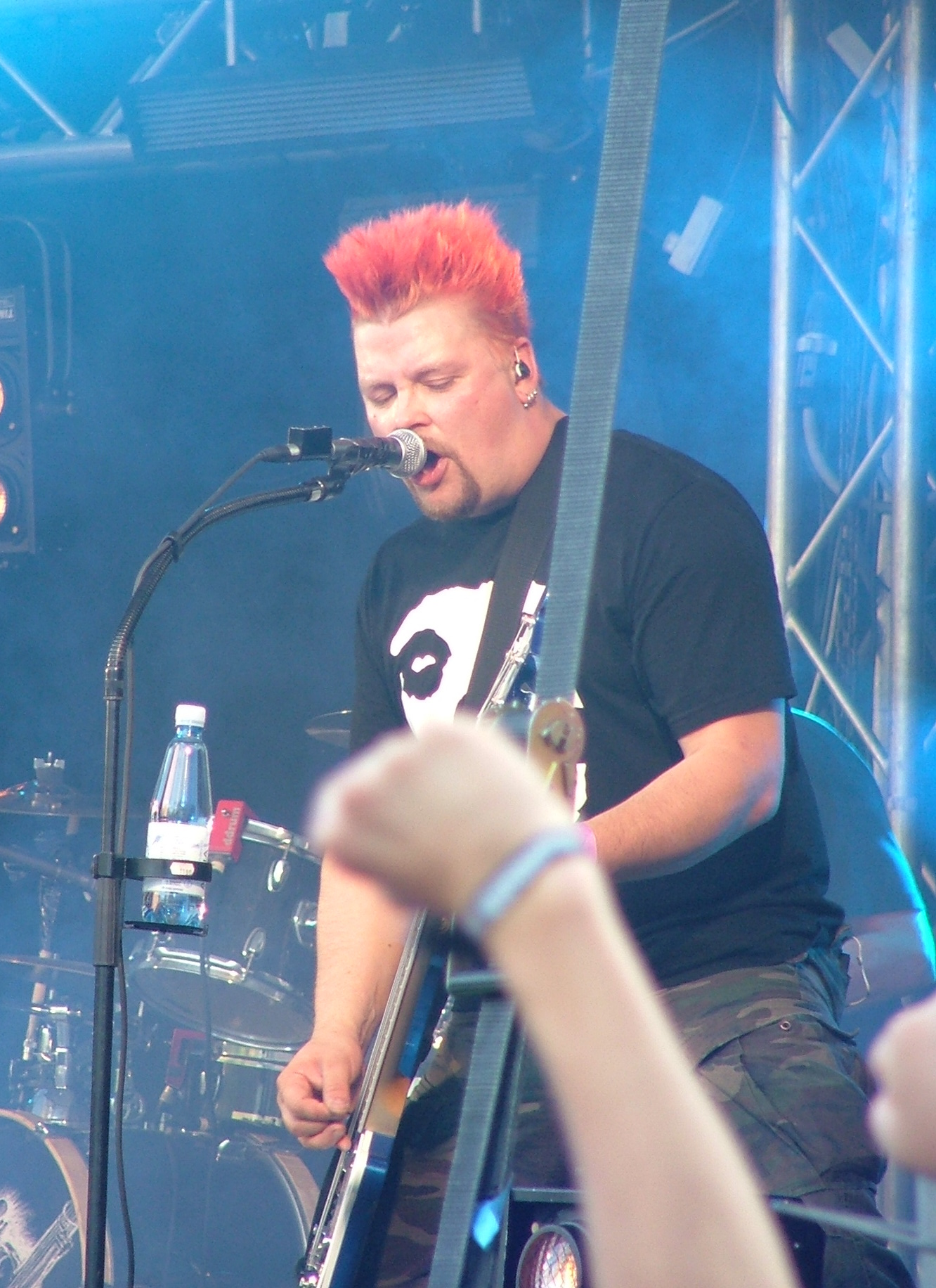
Sami "Severi" Kohtamäki (bass)

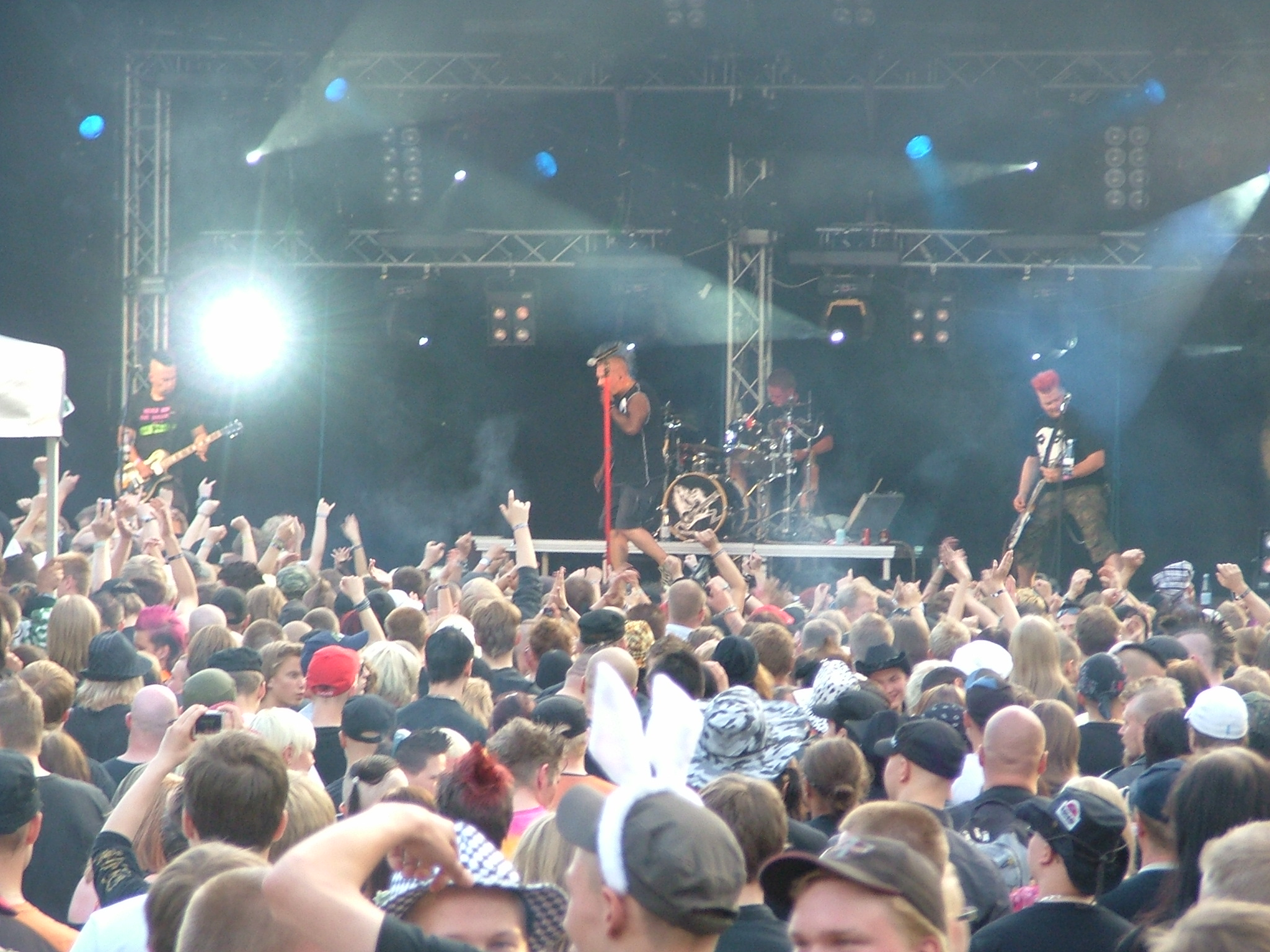
2000- Live
