= Waltari =

Finnish metal band

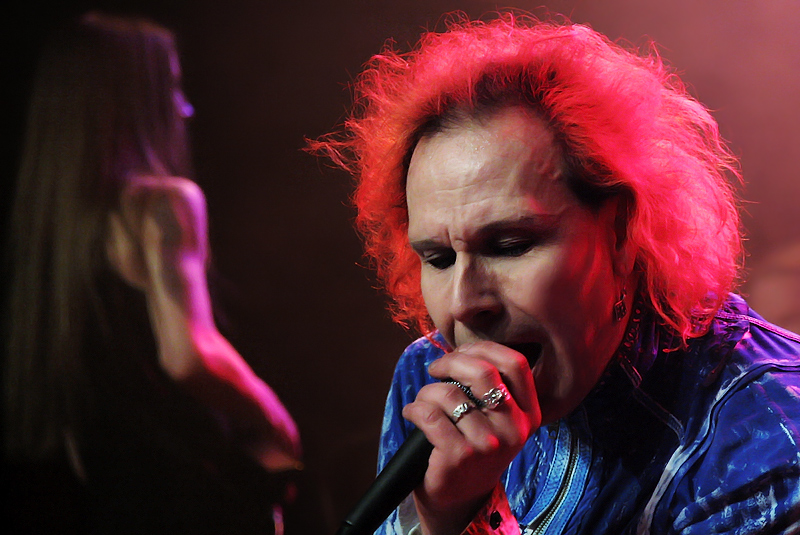
- Waltari in Palac Akropolis, Prague 3 in 2010

Background information
- Origin: Helsinki, Finland
- Genres: Avant-garde metal; alternative metal; progressive metal; extreme metal; crossover
- Years active: 1986–present
- Labels: Rodeostar; Stupido; The All Blacks; Spin; EMI; Edel; Parlophone; Vindauga; Bluelight; Dockyard 1
- Members: Kärtsy Hatakka; Jariot Lehtinen; Sami Yli-Sirniö; Ville Vehviläinen; Kimmo Korhonen; Jani Hölli; Antti Kolehmainen
- Past members: Sale Suomalainen; Janne Parviainen; Roope Latvala; Mika Järveläinen; Janne Immonen; Nino Silvennoinen
- Website: waltariband.com

Waltari is a Finnish experimental metal band from Helsinki known for combining numerous styles, from different metal subgenres such as progressive metal, alternative metal and extreme metal to non-metal styles such as hip hop, pop, industrial, techno, punk and hard rock.

Most of the band's music is written by Kärtsy Hatakka. Finnish metal musicians who started their international career in Waltari include Kreator's Sami Yli-Sirniö, Roope Latvala of Children of Bodom, and Janne Parviainen of Ensiferum.

== History ==
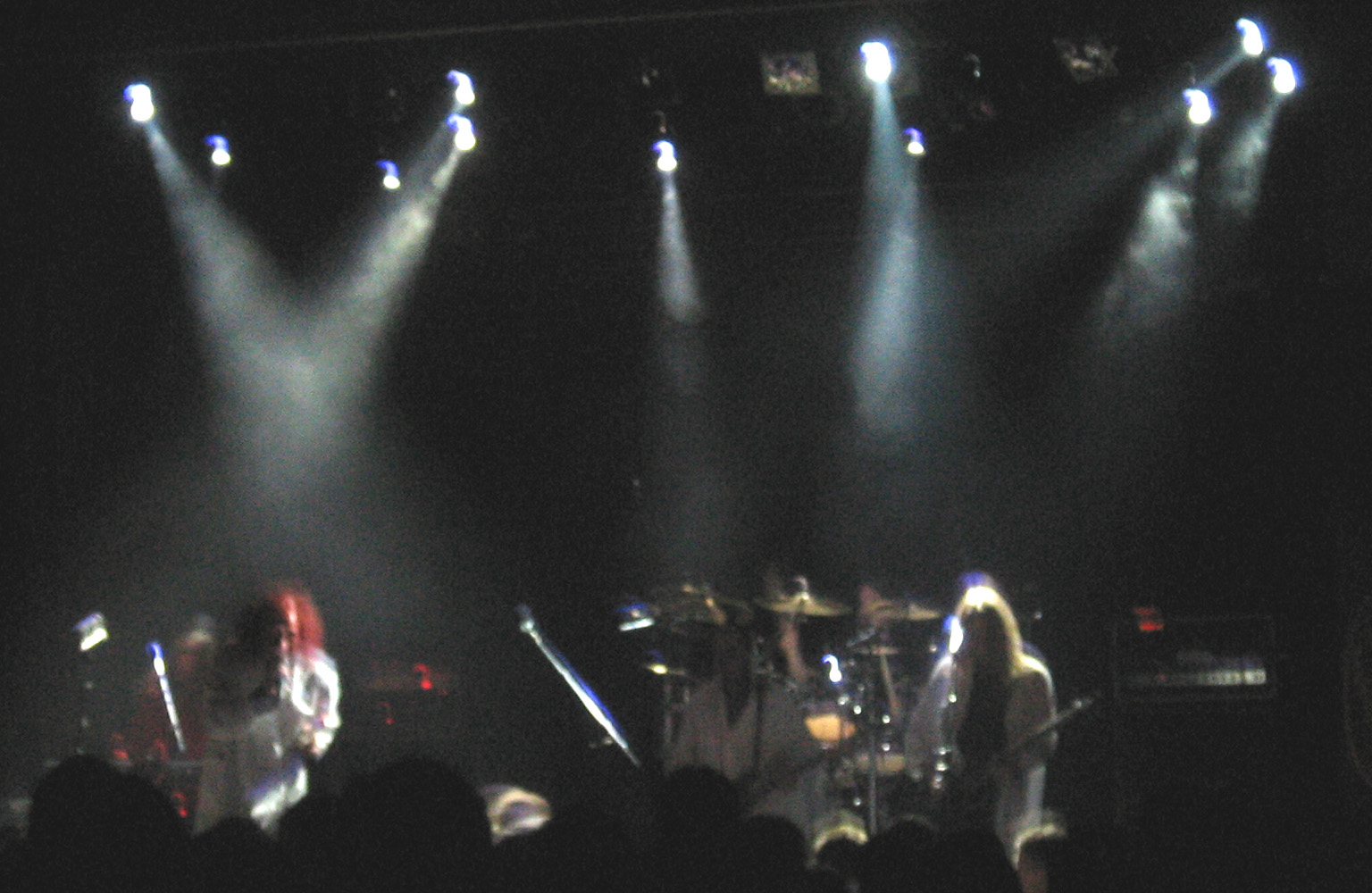
Waltari performing at the Tavastia Club in Helsinki in 2006

Waltari was formed in 1986 in Helsinki by Kärtsy Hatakka (vocals and bass), Jariot Lehtinen (guitars) and Sale Suomalainen (drums). Sami Yli-Sirniö joined as second guitarist in 1989, a year after the release of their first EP, Mut Hei ("But hey!").

Their first 2 albums, Monk-Punk and Torcha!, released in 1991 and 1992 respectively, saw the band begin blending a variety of styles of rock and metal.

After releasing a compilation of early work under the title Pala Leipää ("A Piece of Bread") (1993), the band went on to release So Fine! (1994), a collaboration with Joik group Angelit. Their next album, Big Bang (1995), mixes techno with heavy metal.

In 1995, Roope Latvala joined the band, replacing Sami Yli-Sirniö. At this time, Hatakka was working with conductor Riku Niemi on a project combining heavy metal with classical music. This project eventually became known as Yeah! Yeah! Die! Die! Death Metal Symphony in Deep C. The show was performed in 1995, and the album was released in 1996.

In 1997, the band released Space Avenue, a more progressive work containing more electronic drums, as well as a collaboration with Apocalyptica. In 1998, to celebrate their ten-year anniversary, the band released a compilation titled Decade.

In 1999, Kärtsy Hatakka and Waltari were working on yet another metal/classical collaboration, and this gave rise to the stage show Evangelicum (Evankeliumi). This production differed from Yeah! Yeah! Die! Die! in that it contained music, ballet and a light show. It also featured a new opera singer. The guest vocalist was Tarja Turunen, who was the lead vocalist of the still young band Nightwish. The choreographer was Jorma Uotinen. This show was released in 1999 on DVD. A musical album version of Evankeliumi was not released.

Waltari's next album, Radium Round (1999), featured a strong pop influence. After Radium Round, the band passed out of the public eye, working on less mainstream releases such as the metal / yoik crossover Channel Nordica (2000) and the punk EP Back to Persepolis (2001). However, these releases were very hard to obtain, and for a while Waltari only survived through its live shows. In 2001, the band's old guitarist Sami Yli-Sirniö returned, and Roope Latvala left the band.

In 2004, Waltari released an all-new studio album, Rare Species.

The Blood Sample album was released in 2005. In 2006, "Early Years" was released, a double album presenting remastered versions of the first album Monk-Punk and Pala Leipää, containing additional tracks from the 1980s, never released before and recorded in autumn 2005 by the original trio: Jariot, Kärtsy and Sale.

Waltari released the album Release Date in 2007. This album includes bonus track "Spokebone", a collaboration with Amorphis singer Tomi Joutsen and Finnish ethnic band Värttinä.

Below Zero was released in 2009.

Covers All, a cover album, was released in 2011.

Their album You are Waltari was released on 27 February 2015. A single, "Digging the Alien", was also released as a music video. There was also a video from the second single, "Only the Truth".

Global Rock was released on 20 March 2020.

== Band members ==
=== Current members ===
- Kärtsy Hatakka — lead vocals, bass, keyboards (1986–present)
- Jariot Lehtinen — guitars, backing vocals (1986–present)
- Sami Yli-Sirniö — guitars, backing vocals (1989–1995, 2000–present)
- Ville Vehviläinen — drums (2004–present)
- Kimmo Korhonen — guitars, backing vocals (2009–present)
- Jani Hölli — keyboards (2014–present)
- Antti Kolehmainen — guitars, backing vocals (2017–present)

=== Past members ===
- Sale Suomalainen — drums (1986–1990, 2005)
- Janne Parviainen — drums (1990–2002)
- Roope Latvala — guitars (1995–2001)
- Mika Järveläinen — drums (2002–2004)
- Janne Immonen — keyboards, programming (2006–2014)
- Nino Silvennoinen — guitars, backing vocals (2013–2017)

== Discography ==
=== Albums ===
- Monk-Punk (1991)
- Torcha! (1992)
- Pala leipää (compilation, 1993)
- So Fine! (collaboration with Angelit, 1994)
- Big Bang (1995)
- Yeah! Yeah! Die! Die! Death Metal Symphony in Deep C (1996)
- Space Avenue (1997)
- Decade (compilation, 1998)
- Radium Round (1999)
- Channel Nordica (collaboration with Angelit, 2000)
- Rare Species (2004)
- Blood Sample (2005)
- Early Years (double album, remastered + additional tracks; compilation, 2006)
- Release Date (2007)
- The 2nd Decade – In the Cradle (compilation, 2008)
- Below Zero (2009)
- Covers All (2011)
- You are Waltari (2015)
- Global Rock (2020)
- 3rd Decade - Anniversary edition (re-recording album, 2021)
- Nations' Neurosis (2025)

=== EPs ===
- Waltari (demo) (1988)
- Roskia/Avfall EP (1989)
- Mut Hei EP (1990)
- Aika tuulee EP (1992)
- Misty Man EP (1994)
- The Stage EP (1995)
- Blind Zone EP (1997)
- Back to Persepolis EP (2001)
- Not Enough EP (2005)

== Bibliography ==
- Tuomola, Pauliina (2011). Waltari – suomimetallin pioneerit. Helsinki: Like. ISBN 978-952-01-0624-9.
