= Kimberly Goss =

American heavy metal singer (born 1978)

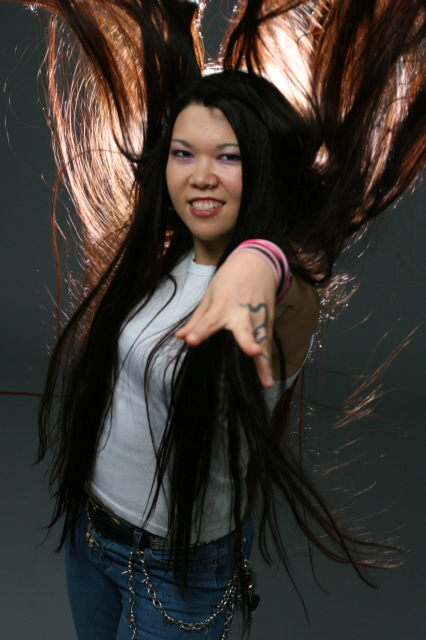
- Goss in 2006

Background information
- Born: 1978 (age 47–48); Los Angeles, California, U.S.
- Origin: Chicago, Illinois, U.S.
- Genres: Heavy metal; extreme metal
- Occupations: Singer; musician
- Instruments: Vocals; keyboards
- Formerly of: Sinergy; Ancient; Dimmu Borgir (touring only); Therion (touring only)
- Spouse: Alexi Laiho (m. 2002; died 2020)

Kimberly Goss (born 1978) is an American heavy metal singer, best known as the frontwoman and co-founder of the Finnish heavy metal band Sinergy (1997–2004).

== Early life ==
Goss was born in Los Angeles, California, to a Korean father and a German mother who worked as a jazz singer. Shortly after, she went with her mother to live in Japan, before coming back to the United States and settling down in Chicago, Illinois, where she was raised for most of her childhood.

== Career ==
Goss started her career in music early, debuting as a singer for the underground band Avernus at the age of fifteen. She went on to write and publish her own underground extreme metal fanzine at the age of sixteen, interviewing widely recognized bands such as Emperor, Darkthrone, Mayhem and Bathory, to name a few. At seventeen, she moved to Norway in order to pursue an offer she received to play keyboards for Norwegian black metal band Ancient. After recording one album with them, they went on tour with Dark Funeral and Bal-Sagoth. Two days after that tour ended, she was also invited to play keyboards and sing backing vocals on Therion's world tour in support of their Theli album. With Therion, she toured with bands like Amorphis, Sentenced and My Dying Bride as well as playing major European festivals like Dynamo Open Air.

In 1997, she was also asked to join Dimmu Borgir as a session keyboardist where they went on to tour to promote their album, Enthrone Darkness Triumphant. During the tour with In Flames in August 1997, she met guitarist Jesper Strömblad and together they formed the first incarnation of Sinergy. She moved to Sweden in 1998 to rehearse with the first lineup of the band and proceeded to record their debut album, Beware the Heavens. She then went on to temporarily play keyboards for Children of Bodom during their 1998 European tour while their own keyboardist was occupied with school. Shortly after, she relocated once again and moved to Finland, where together with original band member Alexi Laiho, they reformed Sinergy with Finnish musicians. Over the years, Sinergy teamed up to tour with the likes of Nightwish, Angra, Dark Tranquillity, In Flames and Children of Bodom. They also played some of the biggest metal festivals in the world including Wacken Open Air.

The success of Sinergy in Japan resulted in Goss receiving an offer to write a monthly column for over three years in Burrn! magazine, the country's most popular music publication. Goss has also made contributions to other bands, writing some lyrics for Children of Bodom on three of their albums, and lending her voice to guest sing with other artists, including Warmen, Eternal Tears of Sorrow, To/Die/For, Exhumation, Kylähullut and The Wicked.

The fourth Sinergy album, Sins of the Past, began production in 2004, but due to Children of Bodom's busy schedule the album was never completed. Alexi Laiho stated in an interview with Ultimate-Guitar.com in February 2011 that Sinergy is now defunct. In mid-2011, Goss began scoring background music for various TV shows that have aired on The CW, ABC Family, Freeform, Syfy and MTV, among others.

== Personal life ==
Goss was in a long-term relationship with and eventually married guitarist Alexi Laiho, who played lead guitar for both Sinergy and Children of Bodom (in which Laiho also did lead vocals). The couple separated in 2004, although they remained close friends. They both shared identical tattoos of a coiled snake around their ring fingers and also had each other's initials tattooed on the upper part of their left arms. After Laiho's death in 2020, the Finnish media revealed that they never got divorced, and were on good terms and had regular text and video contact until the day he died.
