= Roope Latvala =

Finnish guitarist (born 1970)

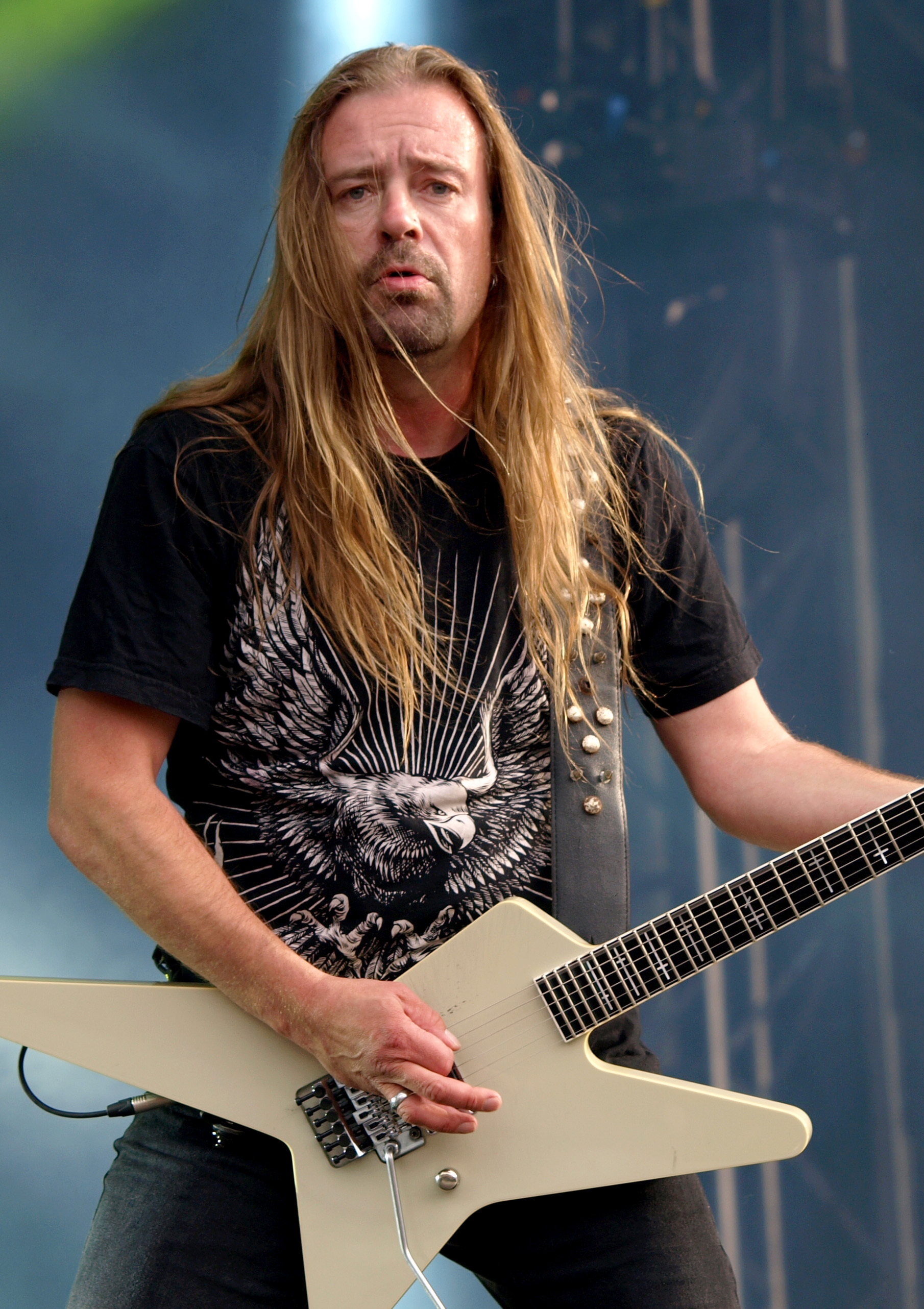
- Latvala with Children of Bodom in 2013

Background information
- Born: Roope Juhani Latvala; 25 June 1970 (age 56); Helsinki, Finland
- Genres: Melodic death metal, thrash metal, power metal
- Occupation: Guitarist
- Years active: 1985–present
- Member of: Stone
- Formerly of: Dementia, Waltari, Children of Bodom, Sinergy, Latvala Bros.

Roope Juhani Latvala (born 25 June 1970) is a Finnish guitarist. He is one of the founding members of the thrash metal band Stone, which was one of the first notable bands in the history of Finnish heavy metal. He was also a former guitarist for the melodic death metal band Children of Bodom from 2003 to 2015 and the co-lead guitarist for Sinergy.

== Biography ==
Latvala was born in Helsinki on June 25th, 1970. At the age of 15, he founded the band Stone together with Janne Joutsenniemi. The band's style was initially focused on a more traditional heavy metal, but they soon shifted to a faster and more aggressive sound, which was the key for them to receive mass recognition. The band was dissolved in 1991, with a discography of four studio albums, one live album and one compilation album.

After the breakup of Stone, he released an instrumental work with his brother, entitled Latvala bros. He then played with Dementia for around a year. In 1995, he joined Waltari after guitarist Sami Yli-Sirniö left the band. They played together for six years before Latvala decided to quit the band.

He joined Sinergy after vocalist Kimberly Goss moved from Sweden to Finland and had to reassemble the band, having assumed the role that previously belonged to Jesper Strömblad (from In Flames).

Latvala has had many side projects and played as a guest musician in many bands, including Warmen, Nomicon, To/Die/For, Pornonorsu, Jailbreakers, Gloomy Grim, Amon Amarth, Children of Bodom, and Soulgrind.

When Alexander Kuoppala left Children of Bodom in 2003 in the middle of their world tour, the members of the band were forced to search for a new guitarist in the time span of one month. According to statements on the band's website, they "felt really relieved when Roope Latvala said: 'Yes, I could help you guys out in this...'", in regards to the vacated guitarist position.

Latvala played the Moscow concert on 16 August successfully. Despite the initial announcement that he would be a session player only, he remained with the band and recorded the Trashed, Lost & Strungout EP. He continued playing with the band and also recorded the hit LP Are You Dead Yet?. Latvala played two guitar solos on Are You Dead Yet?.

When he joined Children of Bodom, Latvala made a deal with ESP Guitars, which already endorsed Laiho and Henkka Seppälä. Before that, he used Jackson Guitars almost exclusively, and it was not unusual for him to use his old Jacksons live.

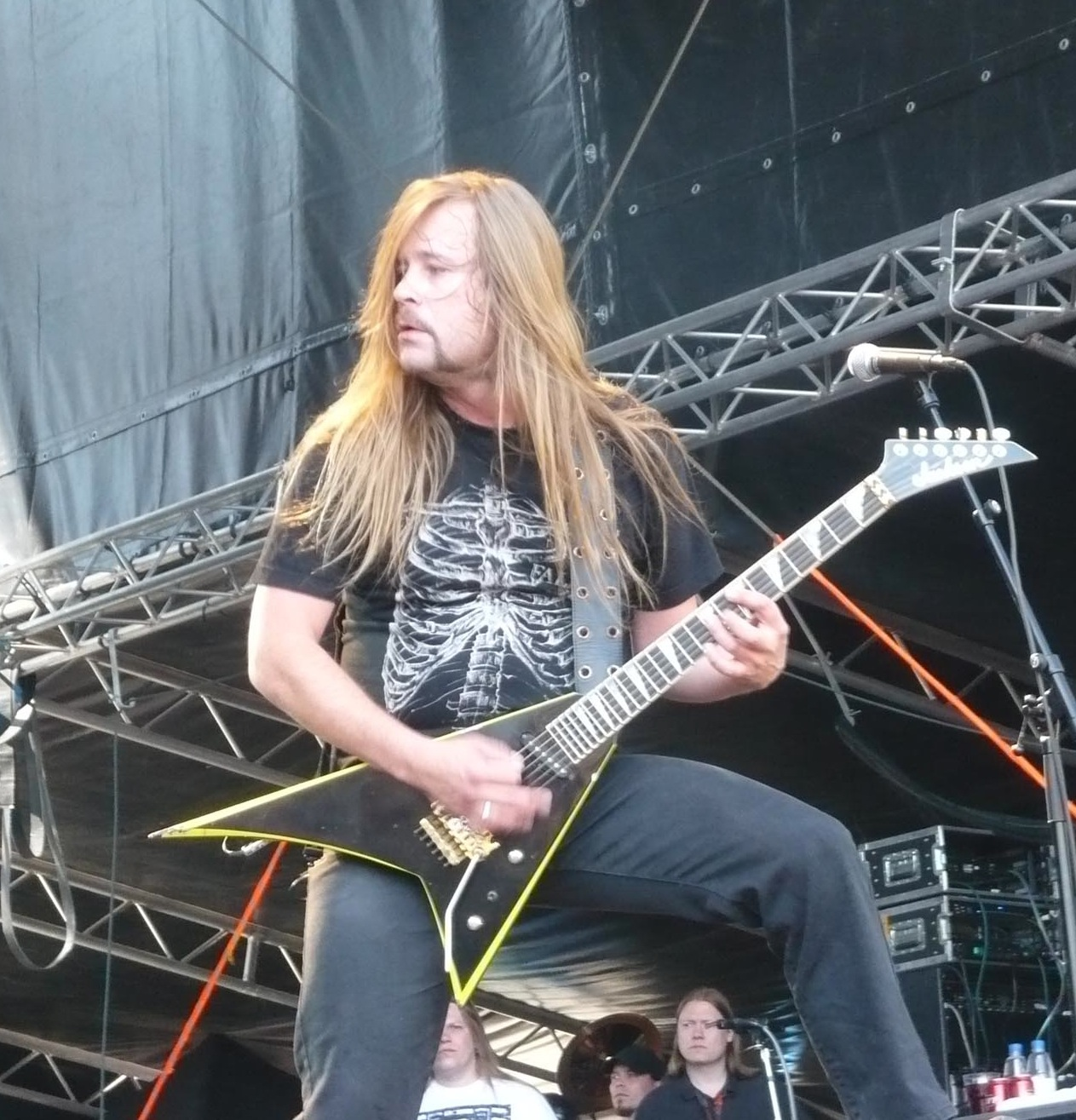
Latvala performing with Stone in 2008

There were rumors which said that he would switch sides with Jesper Strömblad of In Flames, but he denied it saying that he had never heard anything about it.

As of late May 2015, Latvala no longer is a member of Children of Bodom with the band having recorded the I Worship Chaos album as a four-piece, he was later replaced by guitarist Daniel Freyberg of Naildown and Norther.

== Guitars ==
On the Latvala Bros. Myspace page, it states that Latvala uses "metal plectrums". Latvala plays his ESP custom Random Star on stage and in the studio, yet he still, on some occasions, uses his old Jackson RR's. These guitars have become highly famous among Finnish guitar players, and Latvala was instrumental in cementing Jackson Guitars as the best selling guitar brand in Finland.

ESP guitars released in early 2008 an LTD Roope Latvala signature guitar. It features an alder, Star shaped body, a neck-through maple neck with an ebony fretboard, cross inlays and reversed headstock. It includes an Original Floyd Rose bridge, Grover Tuners, a single EMG HZ H-2 bridge pickup with a single volume control. His signature guitar is discontinued in North America as of 2011. ESP produces an ESP comprised Roope Latvala signature series in Japan.
