= List of UK Rock & Metal Albums Chart number ones of 2008 =

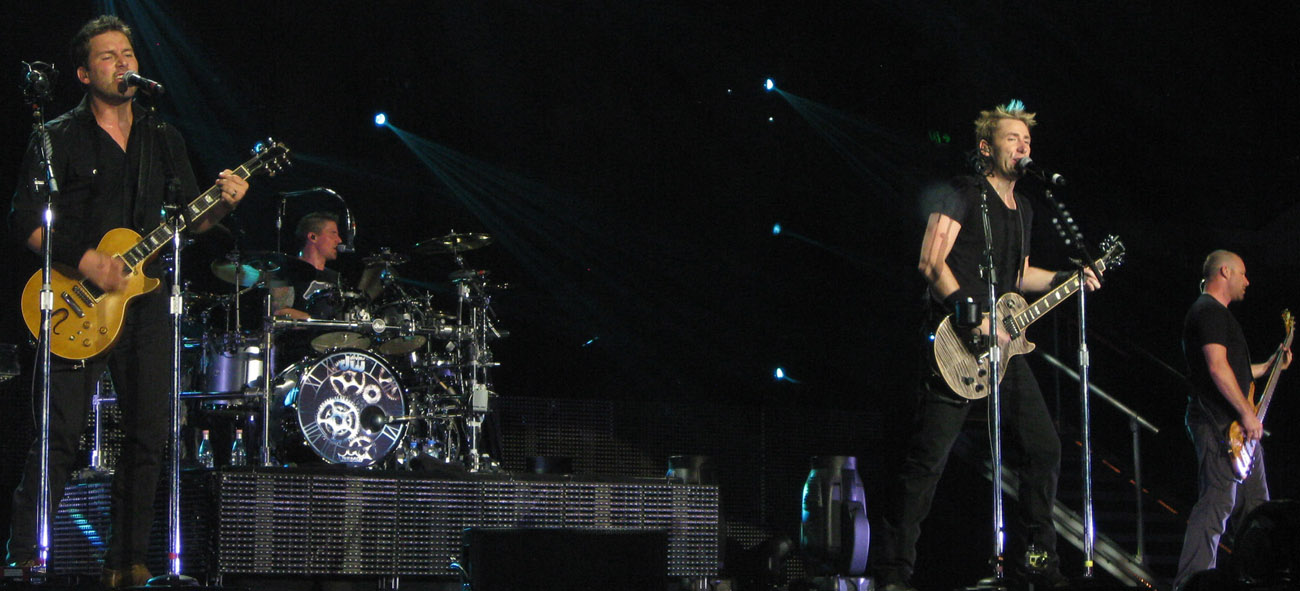
Nickelback's fifth studio album All the Right Reasons was the longest-running number-one album of 2008, spending twelve weeks atop the chart. It was also the best-selling rock and metal album of the year in the UK.

The UK Rock & Metal Albums Chart is a record chart which ranks the best-selling rock and heavy metal albums in the United Kingdom. Compiled and published by the Official Charts Company, the data is based on each album's weekly physical sales, digital downloads and streams. In 2008, there were 24 albums that topped the 52 published charts. The first number-one album of the year was Led Zeppelin's compilation album Mothership, which topped the chart for the week ending 24 November 2007 and remained at number one for seven weeks, including the first week of 2008. The final number-one album of the year was Chinese Democracy, the sixth studio album by American hard rock band Guns N' Roses, which topped the chart for the week ending 6 December and remained at number one until 10 January 2009.

The most successful album on the UK Rock & Metal Albums Chart in 2008 was Nickelback's fifth studio album All the Right Reasons, which spent a total of twelve weeks at number one over four separate spells. All the Right Reasons was also the best-selling rock and metal album of the year in the UK, ranking 11th in the UK End of Year Albums Chart. AC/DC's Black Ice and Chinese Democracy by Guns N' Roses each spent four weeks at number one during the year, while three albums – Muse's HAARP, Kid Rock's Rock n Roll Jesus and Metallica's Death Magnetic – were all number one for three weeks during 2008. An additional five albums – Echoes, Silence, Patience & Grace, Good to Be Bad, Somewhere Back in Time, Indestructible and All Hope Is Gone each spent two weeks at number one during the year.

== Chart history ==
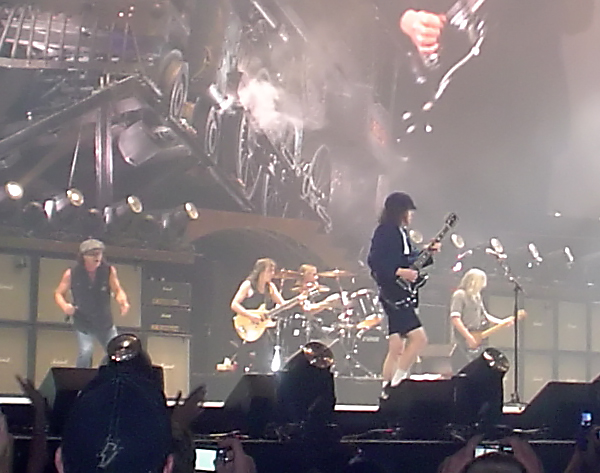
AC/DC's Black Ice spent four weeks at number one in late-2008.

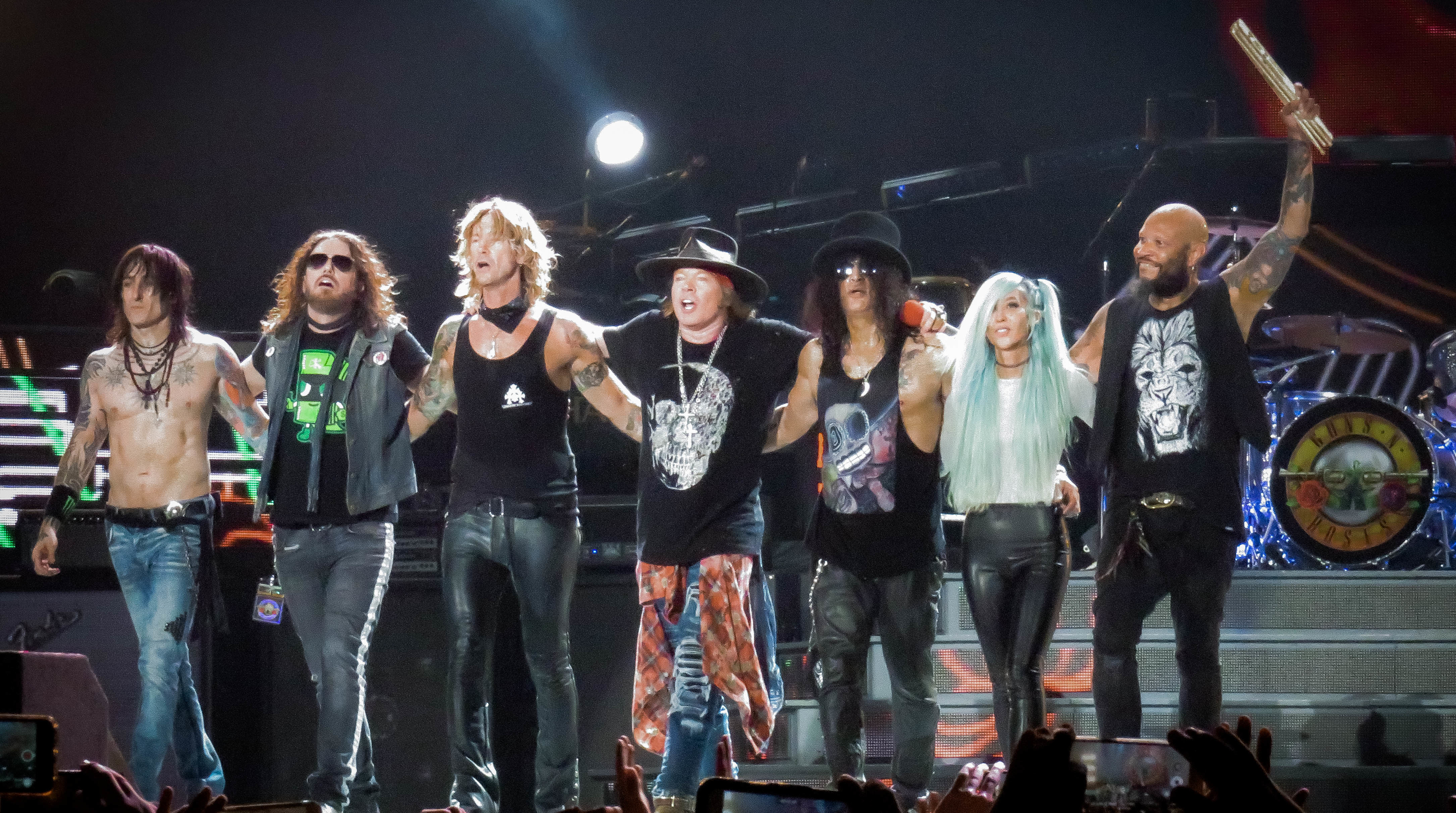
Chinese Democracy, the sixth studio album by Guns N' Roses, spent the last four weeks of the year at number one.

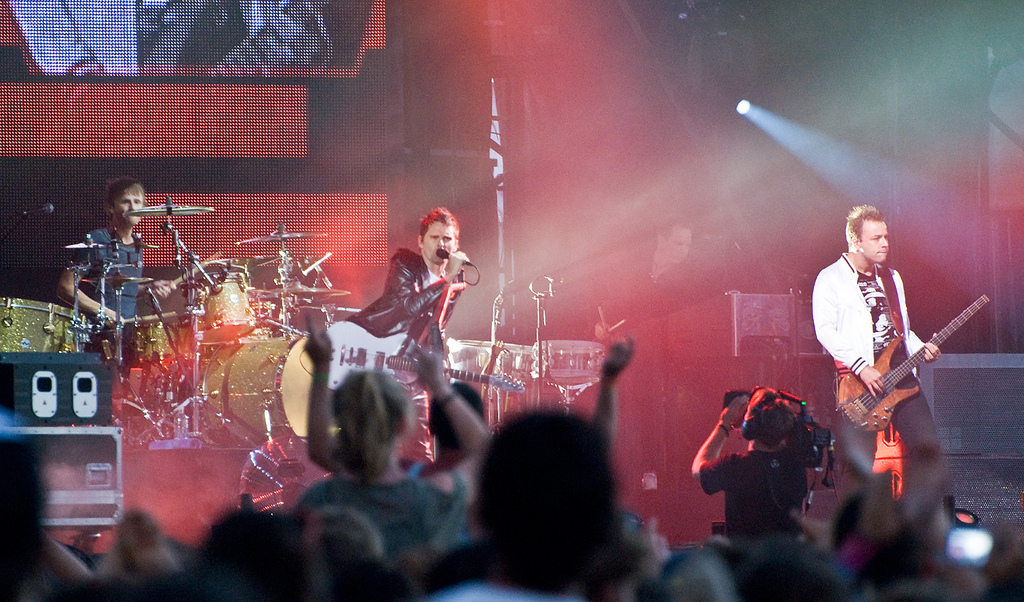
Muse live album HAARP spent three weeks at number one in 2008.

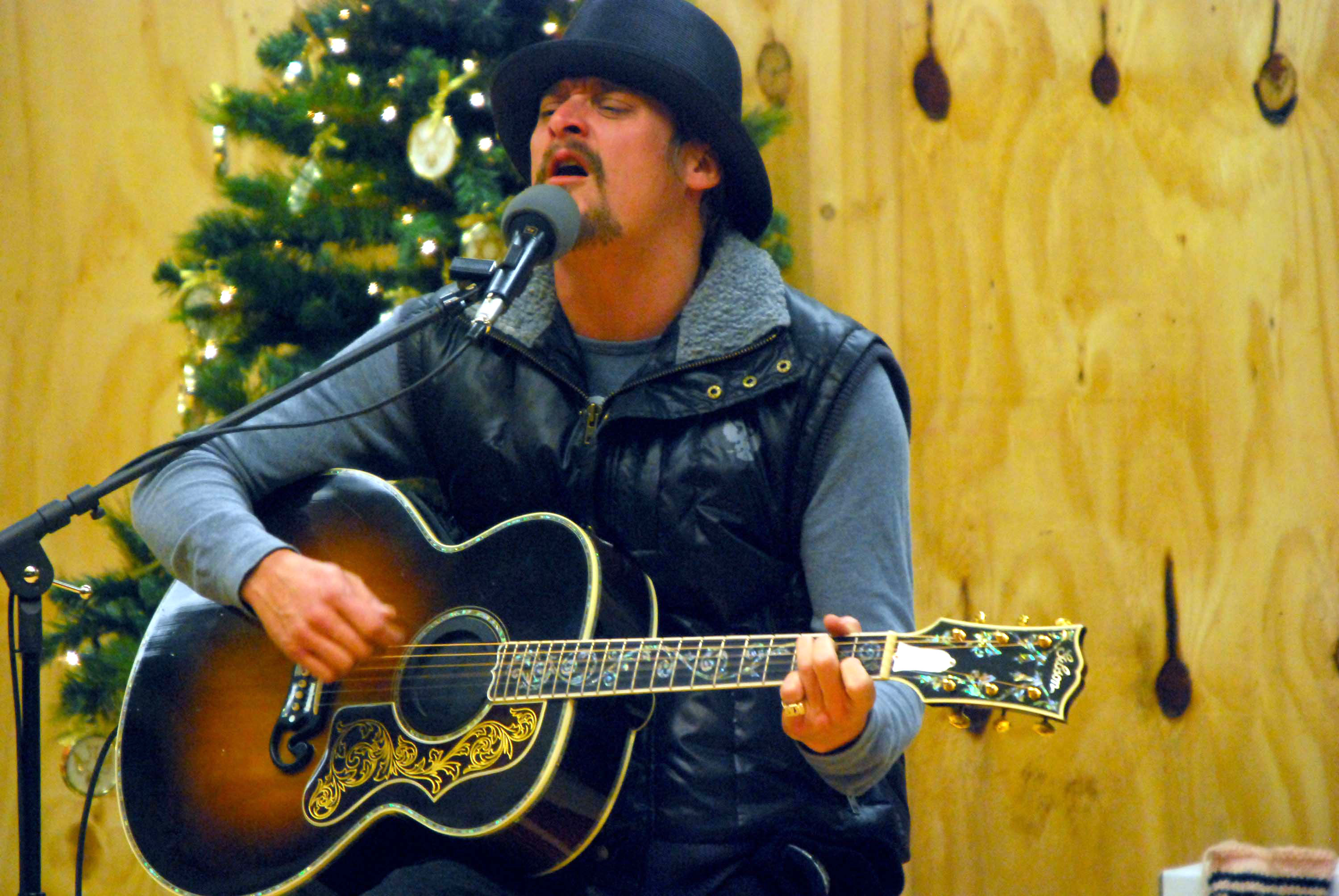
Kid Rock's seventh studio album Rock n Roll Jesus spent three consecutive weeks at number one in August 2008.

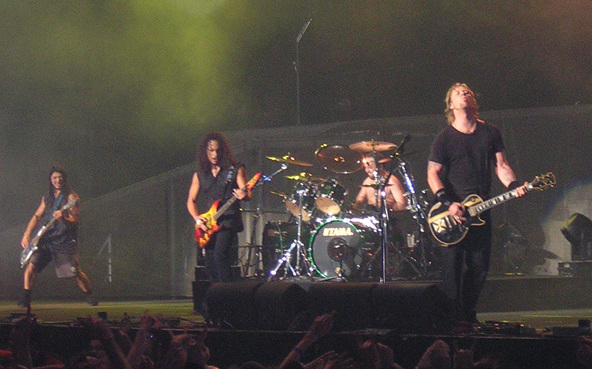
Metallica's Death Magnetic spent three weeks at number one during 2008.

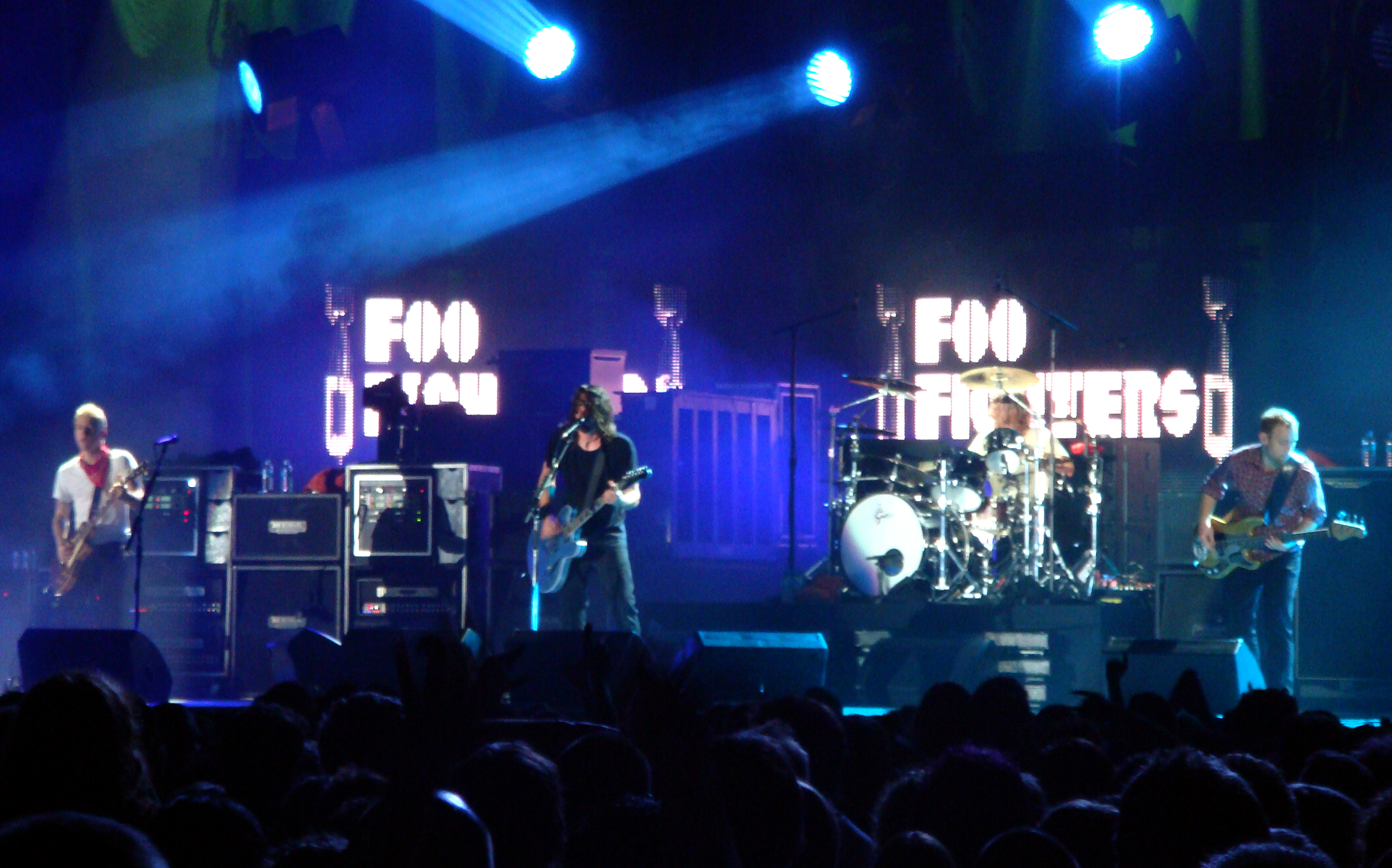
Echoes, Silence, Patience & Grace by Foo Fighters was number one for two weeks in January 2008.

Key
†	Indicates best-selling rock album of 2008

Issue date	Album	Artist(s)	Record label(s)	Ref.
5 January	Mothership	Led Zeppelin	Atlantic	
12 January	Echoes, Silence, Patience & Grace	Foo Fighters	RCA	
19 January	Echoes, Silence, Patience & Grace	Foo Fighters	RCA	
26 January	All the Right Reasons †	Nickelback	Roadrunner	
2 February	All the Right Reasons †	Nickelback	Roadrunner	
9 February	Scream Aim Fire	Bullet for My Valentine	20-20	
16 February	All the Right Reasons †	Nickelback	Roadrunner	
23 February	All the Right Reasons †	Nickelback	Roadrunner	
1 March	All the Right Reasons †	Nickelback	Roadrunner	
8 March	All the Right Reasons †	Nickelback	Roadrunner	
15 March	All the Right Reasons †	Nickelback	Roadrunner	
22 March	All the Right Reasons †	Nickelback	Roadrunner	
29 March	HAARP	Muse	Helium 3/Warner Bros.	
5 April	HAARP	Muse	Helium 3/Warner Bros.	
12 April	HAARP	Muse	Helium 3/Warner Bros.	
19 April	A Sense of Purpose	In Flames	Nuclear Blast	
26 April	Blooddrunk	Children of Bodom	Spinefarm	
3 May	Good to Be Bad	Whitesnake	SPV	
10 May	Good to Be Bad	Whitesnake	SPV	
17 May	Songs from the Sparkle Lounge	Def Leppard	Bludgeon Riffola	
24 May	Somewhere Back in Time	Iron Maiden	EMI	
31 May	Somewhere Back in Time	Iron Maiden	EMI	
7 June	Minutes to Midnight	Linkin Park	Warner Bros.	
14 June	Indestructible	Disturbed	Reprise	
21 June	Indestructible	Disturbed	Reprise	
28 June	Nostradamus	Judas Priest	Columbia	
5 July	All the Right Reasons †	Nickelback	Roadrunner	
12 July	The Black Parade Is Dead!	My Chemical Romance	Warner Bros.	
19 July	All the Right Reasons †	Nickelback	Roadrunner	
26 July	All the Right Reasons †	Nickelback	Roadrunner	
2 August	All the Right Reasons †	Nickelback	Roadrunner	
9 August	Rock n Roll Jesus	Kid Rock	Atlantic	
16 August	Rock n Roll Jesus	Kid Rock	Atlantic	
23 August	Rock n Roll Jesus	Kid Rock	Atlantic	
30 August	Folklore and Superstition	Black Stone Cherry	Roadrunner	
6 September	All Hope Is Gone	Slipknot	Roadrunner	
13 September	All Hope Is Gone	Slipknot	Roadrunner	
20 September	Death Magnetic	Metallica	Vertigo	
27 September	Death Magnetic	Metallica	Vertigo	
4 October	Death Magnetic	Metallica	Vertigo	
11 October	Shogun	Trivium	Roadrunner	
18 October	Take Off Your Colours	You Me at Six	Slam Dunk	
25 October	Memory and Humanity	Funeral for a Friend	Join Us	
1 November	Black Ice	AC/DC	Columbia	
8 November	Black Ice	AC/DC	Columbia	
15 November	Black Ice	AC/DC	Columbia	
22 November	Black Ice	AC/DC	Columbia	
29 November	Dark Horse	Nickelback	Roadrunner	
6 December	Chinese Democracy	Guns N' Roses	Black Frog/Geffen	
13 December	Chinese Democracy	Guns N' Roses	Black Frog/Geffen	
20 December	Chinese Democracy	Guns N' Roses	Black Frog/Geffen	
27 December	Chinese Democracy	Guns N' Roses	Black Frog/Geffen	

== See also ==
- 2008 in British music
- List of UK Rock & Metal Singles Chart number ones of 2008
