= List of UK Rock & Metal Singles Chart number ones of 2008 =

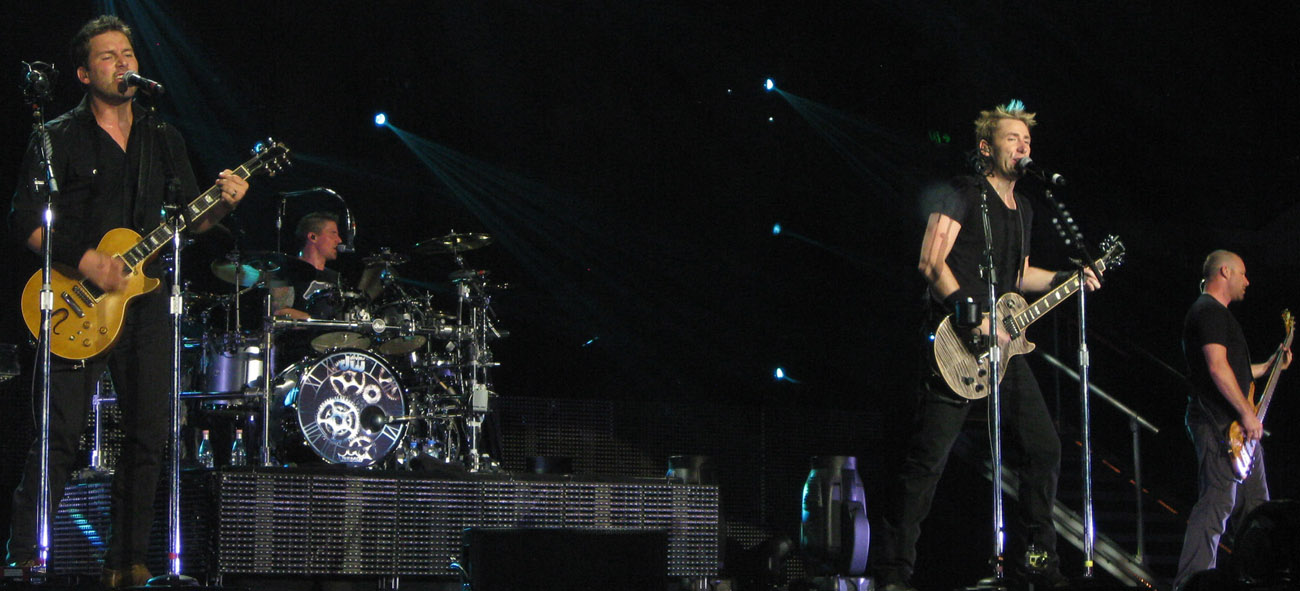
"Rockstar" by Nickelback was the longest-running number one of 2008, spending 23 weeks atop the chart.

The UK Rock & Metal Singles Chart is a record chart which ranks the best-selling rock and heavy metal songs in the United Kingdom. Compiled and published by the Official Charts Company, the data is based on each track's weekly physical sales, digital downloads and streams. In 2008, there were ten singles that topped the 52 published charts. The first number-one single of the year was "Long Road to Ruin" by American alternative rock band Foo Fighters, which spent the last three weeks of 2007 and the first of 2008 atop the chart. The final number-one single of the year was "All Summer Long" by American country rock musician Kid Rock.

The most successful song on the UK Rock & Metal Singles Chart in 2008 was "Rockstar" by Canadian band Nickelback, which spent 23 weeks at number one during the year, including a single run of 20 consecutive weeks. The band spent a total of 29 weeks atop the chart in 2008, with "Photograph" and "Gotta Be Somebody" each spending three weeks at number one. Kid Rock's "All Summer Long" spent a total of 16 weeks at number one during the year, including separate runs of eight and seven consecutive weeks. Only one single – Enter Shikari's "We Can Breathe in Space, They Just Don't Want Us to Escape" – spent two weeks at number one.

== Chart history ==
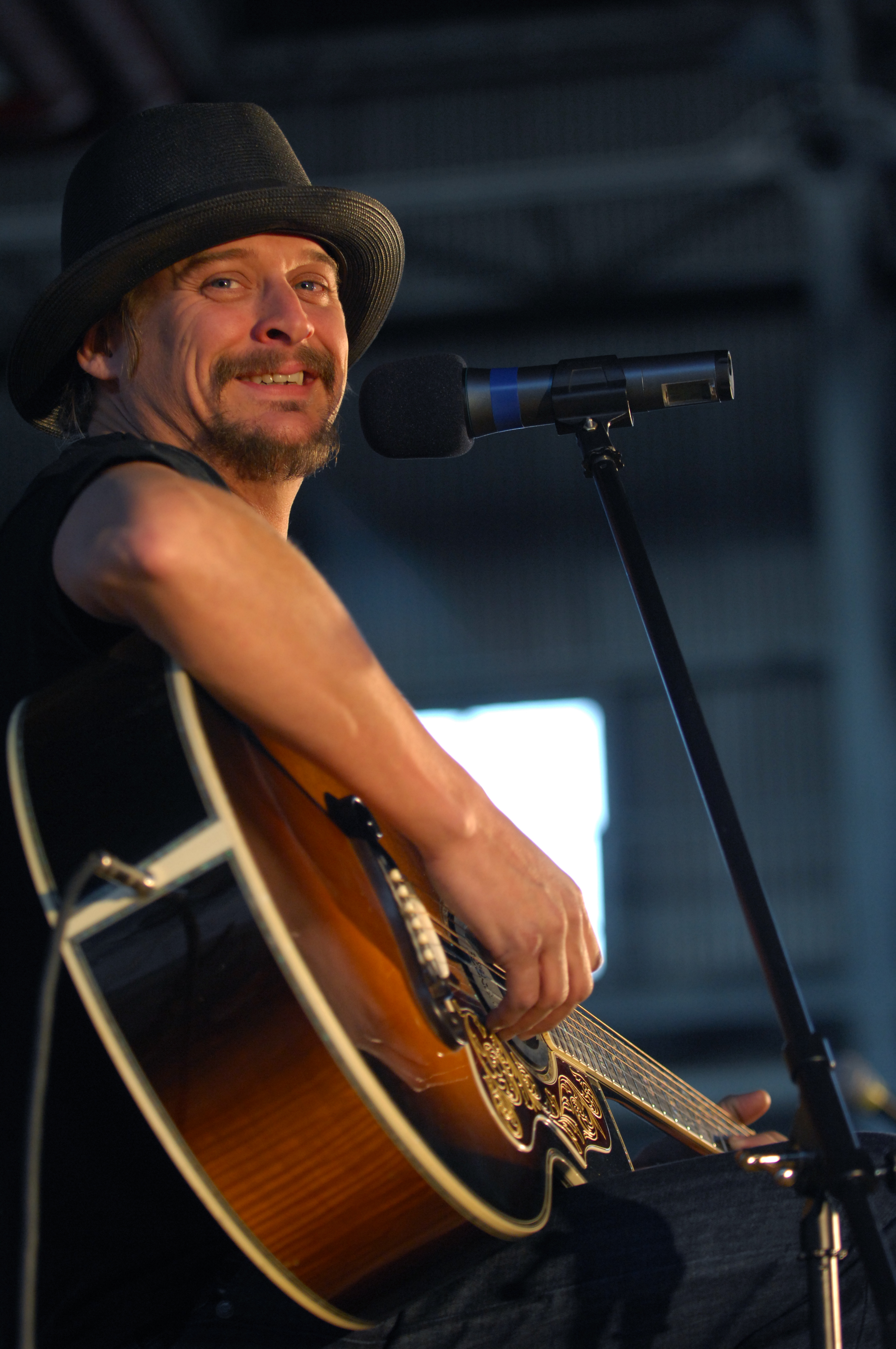
Kid Rock's "All Summer Long" spent a total of 16 weeks at number one on the UK Rock & Metal Singles Chart in 2008.

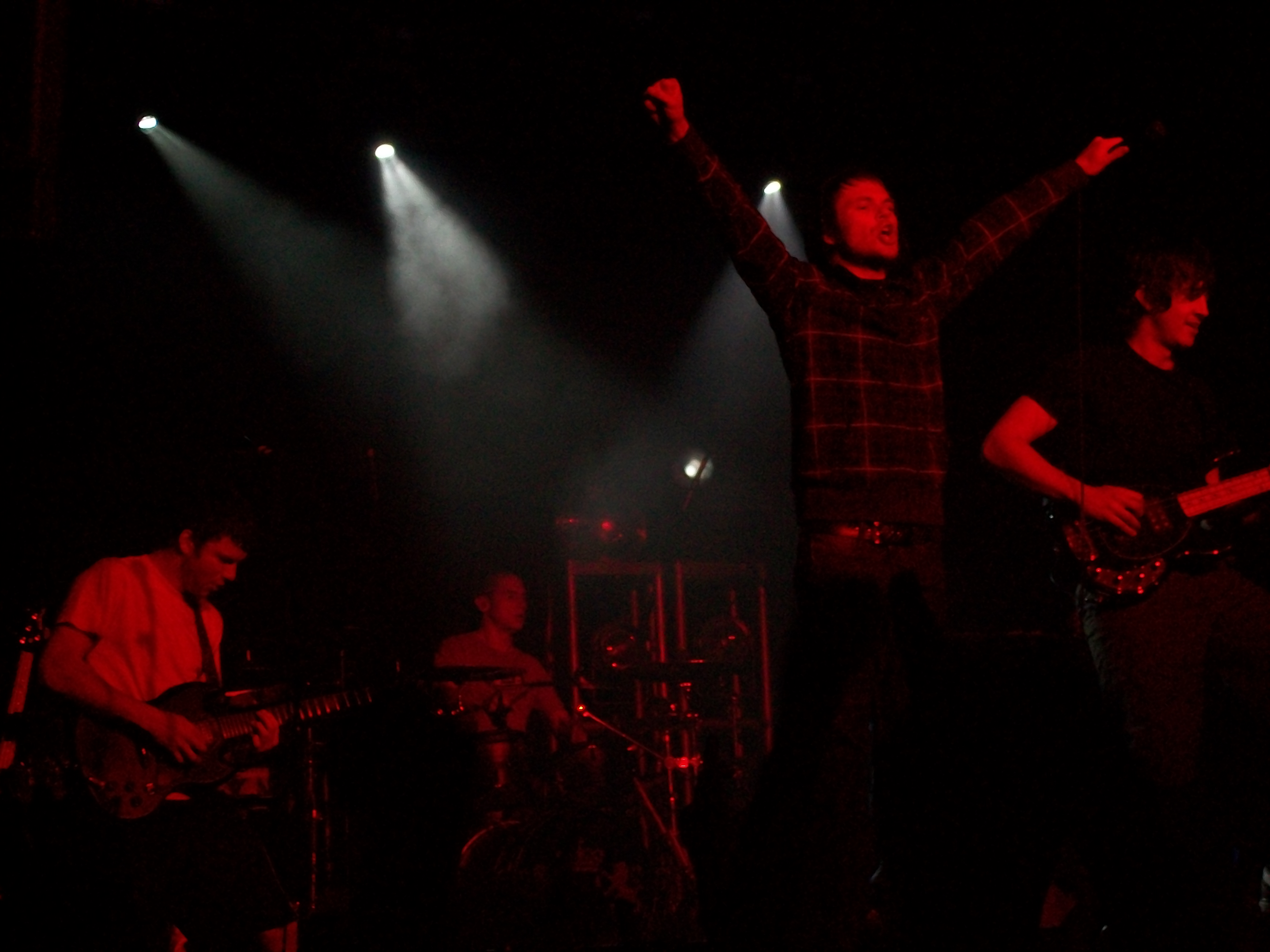
Enter Shikari were number one for two weeks with "We Can Breathe in Space, They Just Don't Want Us to Escape".

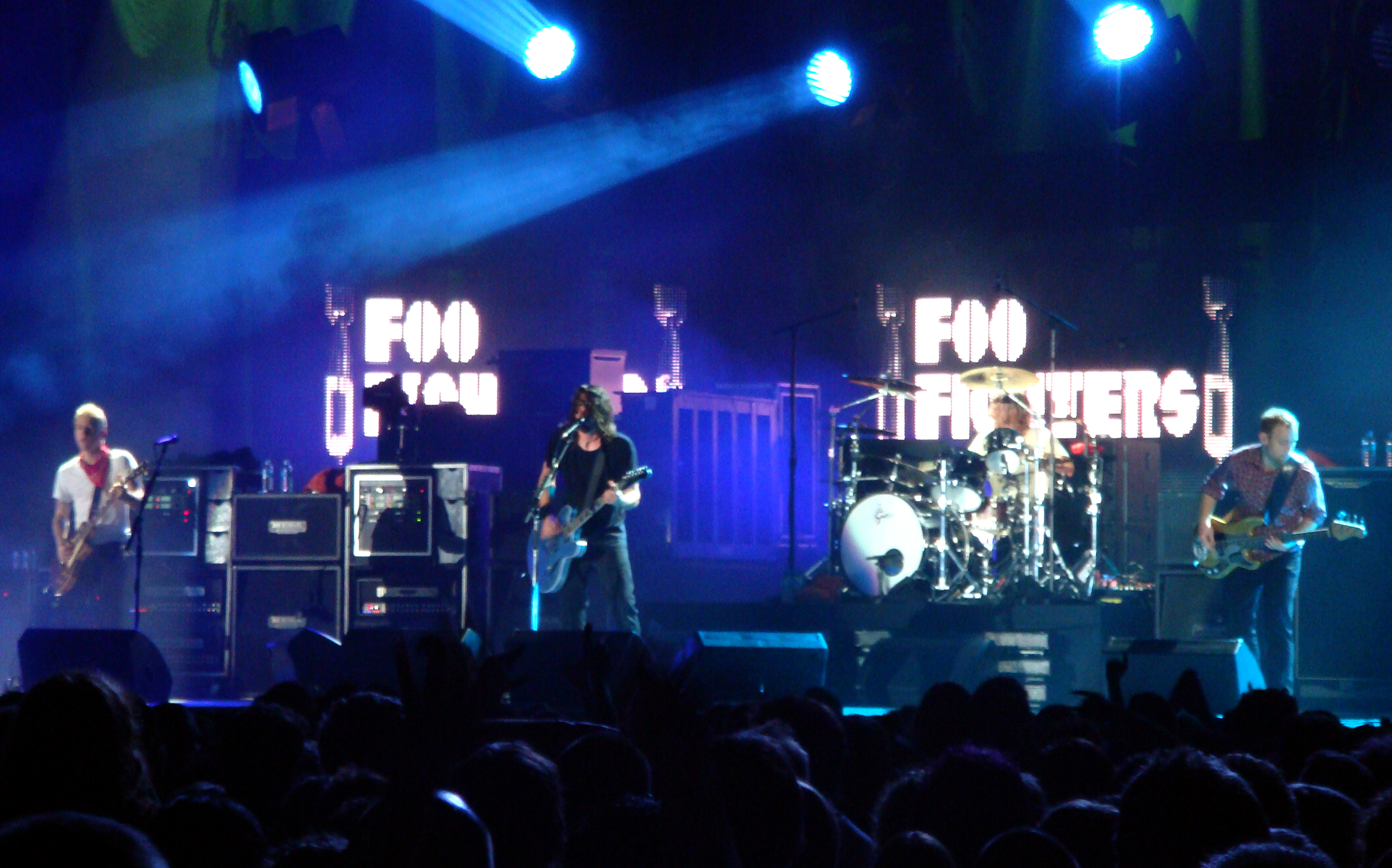
Foo Fighters spent the first week of 2008 at number one at the end of a four-week run with "Long Road to Ruin".

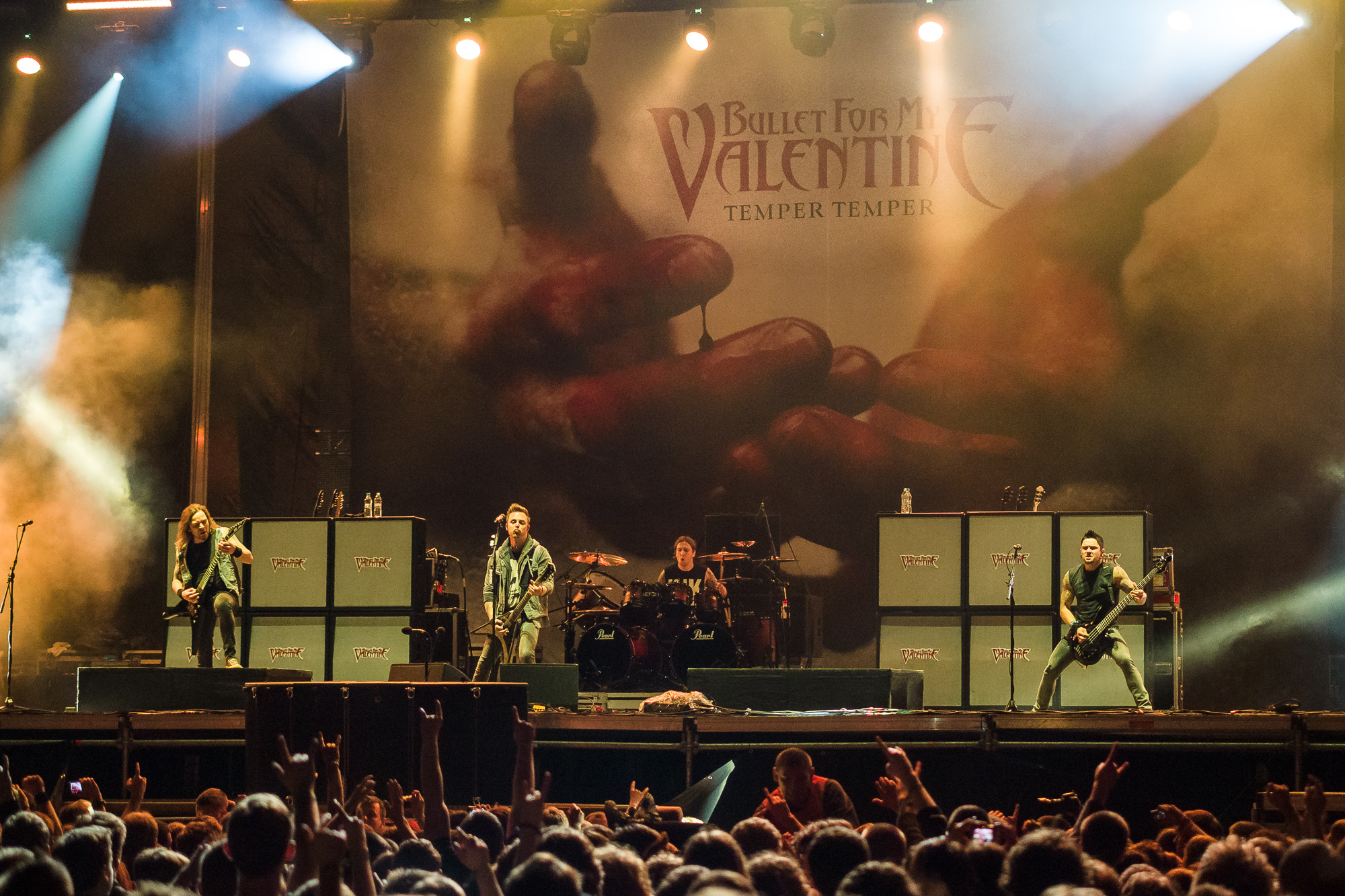
Bullet for My Valentine topped the chart for the first time with "Scream Aim Fire".

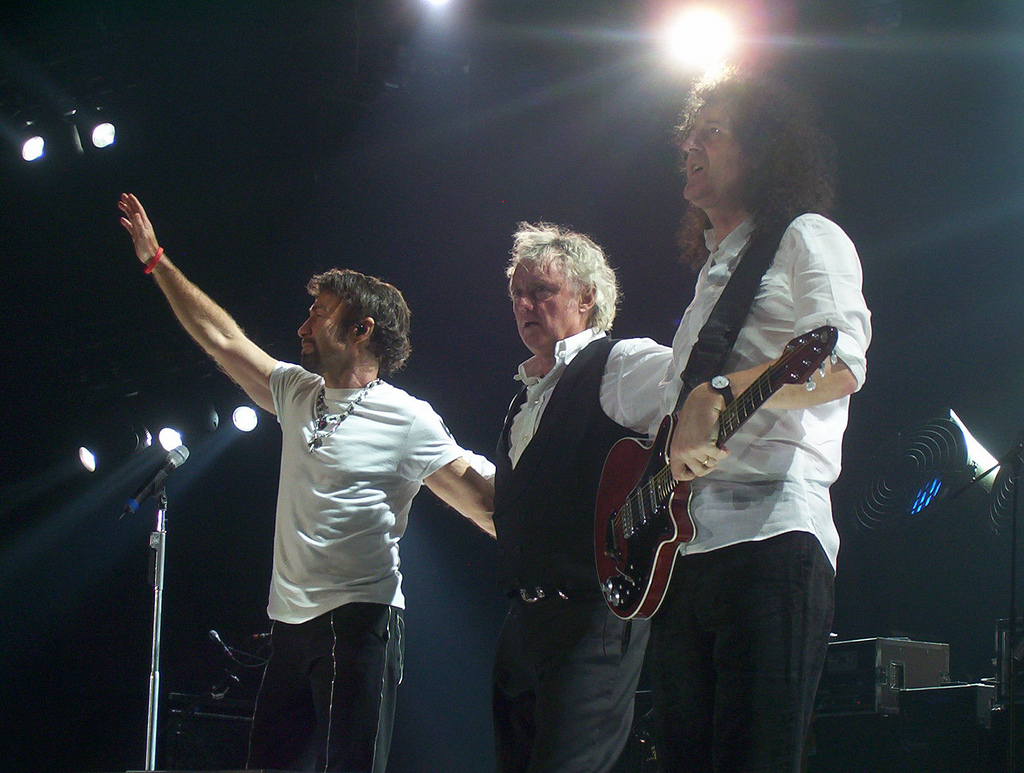
Queen + Paul Rodgers obtained their only number one, "C-lebrity", in 2008.

Issue date	Single	Artist(s)	Record label(s)	Ref.
5 January	"Long Road to Ruin"	Foo Fighters	RCA	
12 January	"Rockstar"	Nickelback	Roadrunner	
19 January	"Rockstar"	Nickelback	Roadrunner	
26 January	"Rockstar"	Nickelback	Roadrunner	
2 February	"Scream Aim Fire"	Bullet for My Valentine	20-20	
9 February	"Rockstar"	Nickelback	Roadrunner	
16 February	"Rockstar"	Nickelback	Roadrunner	
23 February	"Rockstar"	Nickelback	Roadrunner	
1 March	"Rockstar"	Nickelback	Roadrunner	
8 March	"Rockstar"	Nickelback	Roadrunner	
15 March	"Rockstar"	Nickelback	Roadrunner	
22 March	"Rockstar"	Nickelback	Roadrunner	
29 March	"Rockstar"	Nickelback	Roadrunner	
5 April	"Rockstar"	Nickelback	Roadrunner	
12 April	"Rockstar"	Nickelback	Roadrunner	
19 April	"Rockstar"	Nickelback	Roadrunner	
26 April	"Rockstar"	Nickelback	Roadrunner	
3 May	"Rockstar"	Nickelback	Roadrunner	
10 May	"Rockstar"	Nickelback	Roadrunner	
17 May	"Rockstar"	Nickelback	Roadrunner	
24 May	"Rockstar"	Nickelback	Roadrunner	
31 May	"Rockstar"	Nickelback	Roadrunner	
7 June	"Rockstar"	Nickelback	Roadrunner	
14 June	"Rockstar"	Nickelback	Roadrunner	
21 June	"Rockstar"	Nickelback	Roadrunner	
28 June	"I Am the Message"	Fightstar	Gut	
5 July	"Photograph"	Nickelback	Roadrunner	
12 July	"Photograph"	Nickelback	Roadrunner	
19 July	"Photograph"	Nickelback	Roadrunner	
26 July	"All Summer Long"	Kid Rock	Atlantic	
2 August	"All Summer Long"	Kid Rock	Atlantic	
9 August	"All Summer Long"	Kid Rock	Atlantic	
16 August	"All Summer Long"	Kid Rock	Atlantic	
23 August	"All Summer Long"	Kid Rock	Atlantic	
30 August	"All Summer Long"	Kid Rock	Atlantic	
6 September	"All Summer Long"	Kid Rock	Atlantic	
13 September	"All Summer Long"	Kid Rock	Atlantic	
20 September	"C-lebrity"	Queen + Paul Rodgers	Parlophone	
27 September	"All Summer Long"	Kid Rock	Atlantic	
4 October	"All Summer Long"	Kid Rock	Atlantic	
11 October	"All Summer Long"	Kid Rock	Atlantic	
18 October	"All Summer Long"	Kid Rock	Atlantic	
25 October	"All Summer Long"	Kid Rock	Atlantic	
1 November	"All Summer Long"	Kid Rock	Atlantic	
8 November	"All Summer Long"	Kid Rock	Atlantic	
15 November	"We Can Breathe in Space, They; Just Don't Want Us to Escape"	Enter Shikari	Ambush Reality	
22 November	"We Can Breathe in Space, They; Just Don't Want Us to Escape"	Enter Shikari	Ambush Reality	
29 November	"Gotta Be Somebody"	Nickelback	Roadrunner	
6 December	"Gotta Be Somebody"	Nickelback	Roadrunner	
13 December	"Gotta Be Somebody"	Nickelback	Roadrunner	
20 December	"Smile Pretty for the Devil"	Children of Bodom	Spinefarm	
27 December	"All Summer Long"	Kid Rock	Atlantic	

== See also ==
- 2008 in British music
- List of UK Rock & Metal Albums Chart number ones of 2008
