= Reiði =

Studio album by Black Foxxes
- Released: 16 March 2018
- Label: Spinefarm Records/Search And Destroy Records
- Producer: Adrian Bushby

Black Foxxes chronology
I'm Not Well (2016)	Reiði (2018)	Black Foxxes (2020)

Singles from IReiði
- 1. "Sæla" Released: 6 December 2017; 2. "Manic In Me" Released: 5 February 2018; 3. "JOY" Released: 5 March 2018

Reiði (Icelandic for "anger") is the second full-length studio album by English indie rock band Black Foxxes. It was released on 16 March 2018 through Spinefarm Records/Search And Destroy Records and was produced by Adrian Bushby. It was featured on Kerrang! as an Album Of The Week and was placed at #7 on Drowned in Sound's end-of-the-year 15 Favorite Albums of 2018 list.

== Background and recording ==
Most of the record was inspired by one of Mark Holley's trips to Iceland. The lead singer explained: "My mental health was so bad the first time I went to Iceland, but I was starting to see progress every time I went. It was a big step for me to go to a place that is barren, with no-one there and insane weather conditions, and do it all by myself. It felt like there was a mutual relationship between me and that place because I overcame a lot out there. I wrote plenty of music when I went to Iceland the second time, and our new record reflects that."

The band recorded Reiði at VADA studios in Warwickshire, England, with producer Adrian Bushby.

== Musical style and lyrics ==
The album revolves around the opposing concepts of light and dark: "reiði" is the Icelandic word for "rage", and it's pronounced "ray-dee"; instead, "sæla" means "happiness".

Ideally, Reiði is divided in two parts, with a light and ethereal first half, and the second part venturing into darker territories.

The lyrics shift from Holley's constant fight with anxiety and health issues, as he reveals: "The thirst for adventure is an overall theme of the album, but more than that, it’s an obvious journey from start to finish about myself. I sing a lot about rage on this album, and the final words sung on the record are ‘now I understand rage’. That’s what’s pulling it all together – you’re going through this journey of working things out with the writer."

The band experiments with different melodies and riffs, making Reiði a sonically ambitious record that embraces pop and shoegaze influences.

Talking about "Sæla", Holley revealed: "It is about a desire to leave a place that was starting to feel stagnant, I think it’s Foxxes at our poppiest but it’s still got all the undertones of darkness stacked amongst it. I remember watching the film ‘Hunt For The Wilderpeople’ before we headed out to Europe for a show and fell in love with that phrase (and the film) and jotted some lyrics down on the trip that were inspired by it." "Float On" was written by Holley in memory of his cousin who drowned in a river.

== Release and promotion ==
On 6 December 2017, Black Foxxes released a first single, "Sæla", and a corresponding video.

On 5 February 2018, they released the single "Manic In Me", along with a music video shot in Iceland.

On 5 March 2018, they revealed a third single, "JOY", and a video directed by Josh Street and Sam Brown; Holley's dog Tarka appears in it.

From 16 March to 22 March, the band did a promotional run in various HMV stores across the UK to perform a short acoustic set, meet fans and sign copies of the new record.

On 21 September 2018, they released an acoustic version of "Oh, It Had To Be You".

== Critical reception ==
Professional ratings
Aggregate scores
Source	Rating
Metacritic	86/100
Review scores
Source	Rating
All Things Loud	10/10
Dead Press!	8/10 stars
Drowned In Sound	10/10
Louder Sound	3.5/5 stars

Reiði has been critically acclaimed and defined as "exceptional and thought provoking", "nothing short of sublime", containing "more shiver-inducing, goosebump-raising thrills than most bands manage in an entire career".

In particular, critics appreciated how Black Foxxes distanced themselves from the raw and dark atmospheres of I'm Not Well, leaving the door open for light and a sense of hope, evoking tenderness and beginning to heal.

The sound of Reiði has been compared to bands like Alice In Chains, The Xcerts and Manchester Orchestra.

Drowned in Sound included the album in their 15 Favorite Albums of 2018 list, placing it at number 7.

== Track listing ==
No.	Title	Length
1.	"Breathe"	04:25
2.	"Manic In Me"	02:57
3.	"Sæla"	02:49
4.	"The Big Wild"	04:23
5.	"Oh, It Had To Be You"	05:02
6.	"JOY"	04:44
7.	"Am I Losing It"	03:45
8.	"Flowers"	04:23
9.	"Take Me Home"	04:25
10.	"Float On"	05:49
Total length:		42:42

== Personnel ==
- Mark Holley - vocals, guitar
- Tristan Jane - bass guitar
- Anthony (Ant) Thornton - drums
