= Black Foxxes =

English indie rock band

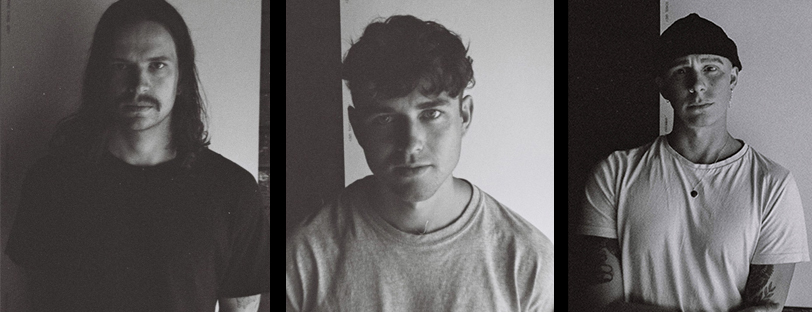
- Black Foxxes as photographed by Connor Laws in 2020

Background information
- Origin: Exeter, England
- Genres: Americana; jazz; indie rock; alternative rock; emo
- Years active: 2013–present
- Label: Spinefarm/Search And Destroy
- Members: Mark Holley; Finnan 'The Fish' Mclean; Sam Irvine; Tiny Hev
- Past members: Tristan Jane; Anthony "Ant" Thornton; Jack Henley; Jack Barrett
- Website: blackfoxxes.com

Black Foxxes are an English indie rock band from Exeter, England. Formed in 2013, the band released a first EP, Pines, in 2014, before signing with Spinefarm Records/Search And Destroy Records the following year. In 2016 they released their debut album I’m Not Well, followed by Reiði in 2018.

Their sound has been described as "a mix of '90s grunge and indie rock with early-2000s emo and alt-country elements."

In 2017, Black Foxxes received two nominations at Heavy Music Awards, one for Best Breakthrough Band and one for Best Album Artwork with I’m Not Well.

== History ==
=== Formation and Pines (2013–2015) ===
Mark Holley, Tristan Jane and Anthony (Ant) Thornton grew up in Exeter, England, and after being part of various bands of the local music scene, they decided to form Black Foxxes in 2013. Holley recalls: “I’d always known Ant (Thornton – drums) in the scene down here and he had just parted ways with Brotherhood Of The Lake, so I gave him a call and we clicked straight away. He got it, invited Tris (Jane – bass) in for a jam and he played so outrageously loud we had to say yes. Here we are now.”

On 24 November 2014, Black Foxxes released their first EP, Pines. It was recorded in a scout hut near Plymouth and released independently. It is a very personal record, where Holley puts into music his feelings and experiences, mainly focusing on mental health issues and his struggle with Crohn's disease.

The EP caught the interest of different labels and music critics, that praised Black Foxxes as "one of the most exciting bands on the UK rock circuit". Among their fans, BBC Radio 1's host Daniel P. Carter, who was also head of A&R for Search And Destroy Records. He played their songs on BBC Radio 1 all the time and he approached the trio on Twitter, showing interest in signing them.

In January 2015, Black Foxxes performed at the BBC Introducing session in Devon, popular show aimed at the discovery of unsigned new talents.

In July 2015 the band officially joined Search And Destroy Records, in partnership with Spinefarm Records and Universal Music. During the summer, Black Foxxes debuted on stage at Reading and Leeds Festivals, before heading on tour with Deerhunter and Turbowolf.

Black Foxxes continued touring until the end of 2015: in October they played at the Warped Tour festival in London, and in December they joined Lower Than Atlantis, As It Is, and Moose Blood for some shows in the UK.

=== I'm Not Well (2016–2017) ===
At the beginning of 2016, the band started working on new music. Bassist Tristan Jane declared: "We hid ourselves away in a rad little studio in the heart of Devon in the middle of nowhere and just got stuck in really. Log fires, artisanal coffee, nothing but fields as far as the eye can see. It was the ideal setting really. And the studio itself was amazing, so that paired with Adrian Bushby our producer extraordinaire was a dream come true for us."

In spring 2016, they joined Milk Teeth and Eat Me for a tour across the UK, and on 29 May 2016 they performed at the BBC Radio 1's Big Weekend festival in Exeter.

On 19 August 2016, they released their first studio album, I'm Not Well, featuring the singles "Whatever Lets You Cope", "How We Rust", "Husk" and the title track "I'm Not Well". The record received positive reviews: in particular, it was acclaimed for its maturity and authenticity, with Holley's lyrics being a powerful tool to deal with emotions and anxiety.

During summer 2016, the band performed at Download Festival and for the second time at Reading and Leeds, before embarking on their first headlining tours in the US and the UK.

On 16 December 2016, Black Foxxes released the EP Headsick Sessions (Live), consisting of two covers - "Wrecking Ball" by Ryan Adams and "Molten Light" by Chad VanGaalen - and one original track, "Neige (acoustic)", already available as bonus track on I'm Not Well.

The band spent most of 2017 on tour: in February, they supported Taking Back Sunday in Glasgow and London, before joining Vant in March and You Me At Six in April for some shows across the UK. At the end of May, the played at Slam Dunk Festival with Milk Teeth, Enter Shikari, Don Broco, Against Me! and many other bands. In November, they toured in the UK along with Deaf Havana and Decade.

=== Reiði (2018–2019) ===
On 16 March 2018, Black Foxxes released their second album, Reiði. The title is an Icelandic word that means "rage", and it's pronounced "ray-dee". Mark Holley wrote most of the record in Iceland. "My mental health was so bad the first time I went to Iceland,” he explained. “But I was starting to see progress every time I went. It was a big step for me to go to a place that is barren, with no-one there and insane weather conditions, and do it all by myself. It felt like there was a mutual relationship between me and that place because I overcame a lot out there. I wrote plenty of music when I went to Iceland the second time, and our new record reflects that."

The album was preceded by hit single "Manic In Me", shot in Iceland in January. Other singles include "Sæla", "Joy" and "Breathe".

Reiði was featured by Kerrang! as Album Of The Week, and the press defined it as "raw, fearlessly emotional, honest, like a breath of fresh air", containing "more shiver-inducing, goosebump-raising thrills than most bands manage in an entire career."

In spring 2018, the band toured across Europe and the UK, and they spent the summer performing at festivals. In September and October 2018, Mark Holley played some acoustic shows in six different cities in the UK.

On 17 August 2018, Black Foxxes revealed a cover of The Cure's hit "Lovesong", along with an accompanying video.

On 21 September 2018, they released a second track, an acoustic version of "Oh, It Had To Be You", taken from Reiði.

=== Black Foxxes (since 2020) ===
On 2 March 2020 Thornton announced both his and Jane's departure from the band via social media. On 17 July 2020 the band released a new track titled "Badlands" as well as the replacement of Thornton and Jane with new drummer Finn Mclean and bassist Jack Henley. On 14 August 2020 the band announced details of their third, self-titled studio album released on 30 October 2020 on Search And Destroy Records / Spinefarm Records. The announcement came with the 2nd single titled "Swim".

== Members ==
Current members

- Mark Holley - vocals, guitar
- Finn Mclean - drums
- Jack Barrett - bass guitar

Past members

- Tristan Jane - bass guitar
- Anthony (Ant) Thornton - drums
- Jack Henley - bass guitar

== Discography ==
=== Studio albums ===
- I'm Not Well (2016)
- Reiði (2018)
- Black Foxxes (2020)
- The Haar (2025)

=== EPs ===
- Pines (2014)
- Headsick Sessions (Live) (2016)

== Awards ==
Nominated work	Year	Award	Result
Black Foxxes	2017	Heavy Music Awards Best Breakthrough Band	Nominated
I'm Not Well	2017	Heavy Music Awards Best Album Artwork	Nominated
