= Black Foxxes (album) =

Studio album by Black Foxxes
- Released: 30 October 2020
- Length: 49:23
- Label: Spinefarm

Black Foxxes chronology
Reiði (2018)	Black Foxxes (2020)

Singles from Black Foxxes
- 1. "Badlands" Released: 17 July 2020; 2. "Swim" Released: 14 August 2020; 3. "Drug Holiday" Released: 18 September 2020; 4. "Jungle Skies" Released: 16 October 2020

Black Foxxes is the third studio album by British indie rock band, Black Foxxes. The album was released on 30 October 2020 through Spinefarm Records.

== Track listing ==
No.	Title	Length
1.	"I Am"	2:41
2.	"Badlands"	8:29
3.	"Drug Holiday"	3:28
4.	"My Skin Is"	4:55
5.	"Panic"	4:57
6.	"Swim"	5:36
7.	"Jungle Skies"	4:50
8.	"Pacific"	4:56
9.	"The Diving Bell"	9:31
Total length:		49:23

Unreleased Bonus Track = “45”

== Critical reception ==
Professional ratings
Aggregate scores
Source	Rating
Album of the Year	80/100
Review scores
Source	Rating
Dork	4/5 stars
Kerrang!	4/5 stars
The Line of Best Fit	8/10
Upset Magazine	4/5 stars

Black Foxxes was well received by contemporary music critics. On review aggregator website, Album of the Year, Black Foxxes has an average critic score of 80 out of 100, based on four critic reviews. James Hickie, writing for Kerrang! magazine said that the album has a "relative looseness" and "is the sound of enjoyment being had by its creators — not necessarily in what they’re writing about, which is often no picnic, but revelling in the sheer liberation of creating exactly the music they want. And wonderful it is too." Hickie awarded the album four stars out of five.

Steven Loftin, writing for Dork also gave the album four stars. Loftin said that with Black Foxxes "comes the need to resurface as something bigger and grander than they were before, without letting anything dictate just what they should be doing. Mission accomplished, in that case." Dave Beech, writing for The Line of Best Fit offered a mixed review as far as the sound comes off on Black Foxxes stating "it might well have lost some of the raw catharsis harboured by those records", comparing the self-titled album to their first two albums, Reiði and I'm Not Well. Beech concluded though that the self-titled album "showcases the band’s sheer talent, proving them as not just one of the best alt-rock bands around, but one of the more interesting bands around." Beech gave the album and 8 out of 10.
