= Drew Hester =

American drummer (born 1969)

- Born: August 26, 1969 (age 56)
- Occupation: Musician
- Website: Drew Hester on Facebook

Drew Hester (born August 26, 1969) is a drummer, percussionist, and record producer, winning two Grammy Awards with Foo Fighters. He has played with Joe Walsh (1999—2016) on drums, Stevie Nicks (2017–present) on drums, Beck (2014) on drums/percussion, Jewel (2006—2007) on drums, Foo Fighters (2005—2014) on percussion, Chicago (2009—2012) on drums and percussion, Lisa Marie Presley (2002—2006) on drums, Common Sense (1992—2005) on drums, Taylor Hawkins and the Coattail Riders on drums and percussion, and with many others.

In 2006, Hester toured with the Foo Fighters on their AFOOSTIC tour and played percussion on their live album and DVD Skin and Bones. Hester also produced the 2006 self-titled album of Taylor Hawkins and the Coattail Riders, and was also given credit for mixing the album. Hester also performs on the songs "It's Ok Now", "End Of The Line", "You Drive Me Insane" (percussion), "Better You Than Me" (handclaps and percussion), "Walking Away" (piano) and "Running In Place" (drums).

In 2008, Hester was given credit for mixing and as an engineer on the Foo Fighters single "The Pretender", the first off of their album Echoes, Silence, Patience & Grace. He is also credited for playing percussion on the songs "Come Alive", "Let it Die", "Cheer Up, Boys (Your Make Up Is Running)", "Long Road to Ruin" and "Summer's End". In 2008, the Foo Fighters won two Grammys for Best Rock Album and for Best Hard Rock Performance.

In addition, Hester plays drums at Saddleback Church in Orange County, California.

In January 2009, Hester joined Chicago on drums while Tris Imboden was undergoing medical treatment. Hester played drums on the 2009 Chicago & Earth, Wind and Fire tour. After Imboden returned to active duty, Hester remained part of the band on percussion. In 2012, he departed to rejoin Joe Walsh and ex-Santana player Walfredo Reyes Jr. assumed that role.

Hester endorses Evans Drum Heads.

== Discography ==
Band Name	Album title	Year	Roles	Source
Common Sense	Live at the Belly Up	1993	Drums	
Common Sense	State of the Nation	1999	Drums	
Common Sense	self-titled	2002	Drums	
Foo Fighters	One by One	2002	Percussion	
Songseeker	Purpose Driven	2002	Drums	
Common Sense	Don't Look Back	2003	Drums	
Bill Madden	Samsara's Grip	2004	Drums	
Lisa Marie Presley	Now What	2005	Percussion	
Foo Fighters	In Your Honor	2005	Percussion	
Taylor Hawkins and the Coattail Riders	self-titled	2006	Drums, Percussion, Producer, Engineer and Mixing	
Leah Shafer	Her Other Life	2006	Drums, Percussion, Producer, Engineer and Mixing	
Foo Fighters	Skin and Bones	2006	Percussion/Vibes	
Justin Adams	Less Like Me	2007	Drums, Percussion, Producer, Engineer and Mixing	
Foo Fighters	Echoes, Silence, Patience & Grace	2007	Percussion	
Daniel Powter	Under the Radar	2008	Percussion	
Tony Guerrero	Apasionado	2008	Vibes	
Taylor Hawkins And The Coattail Riders	Red Light Fever	2010	Producer and Percussion	
Chicago	O Christmas Three	2011	Percussion, Mixing	
Foo Fighters	Wasting Light	2011	Percussion	
