= Let It Die (Foo Fighters song) =

2008 single by Foo Fighters

Single by Foo Fighters

from the album Echoes, Silence, Patience & Grace
- Released: June 24, 2008
- Recorded: March–June 2007
- Genre: Hard rock
- Length: 4:05
- Label: Roswell/RCA
- Songwriters: Dave Grohl; Taylor Hawkins; Nate Mendel; Chris Shiflett
- Producer: Gil Norton

Foo Fighters singles chronology
"Cheer Up, Boys (Your Make Up Is Running)" (2008)	"Let It Die" (2008)	"Wheels" (2009)

"Let It Die" is the fourth single from the Foo Fighters' sixth album, Echoes, Silence, Patience & Grace. It was only released as a promotional single in 2007 and no physical retail single was released. It was, however, available commercially as a digital downloadable single.

== Meaning ==
The song's meaning was hinted in a Canadian Television interview. It was mentioned that it was about personal fights between people, and those people breaking apart, and that the fights are meaningless overall. Further speculation leads to Grohl's forbearance between Courtney Love, and Kurt Cobain (Grohl's former bandmate from Nirvana and Love's husband)'s relationship, drug use, and financial arrangements. Grohl indirectly admitted to the song being about Courtney Love in an interview in 2007.

== Live performances ==
The song was a staple on the Echoes, Silence, Patience, and Grace tour. It was also played often on the Wasting Light tour but was dropped in 2012. It was not played again until the Concrete and Gold tour in 2017, where it has been played occasionally.

== Track listing ==
The single has currently only been released as an iTunes exclusive digital download, listed as a digital EP. All songs by Foo Fighters, except where noted.

1. "Let It Die" – 4:05
2. "Keep the Car Running" (Arcade Fire cover) – 3:25
3. "If Ever" – 4:14
4. "Come Alive" (demo version) – 5:30

== Personnel ==
Personnel adapted from Echoes, Silence, Patience & Grace liner notes. (Note: The band members' instruments are not credited in the album's liner notes. Their primary instruments are listed based on their de facto primary roles in the group.)

Foo Fighters

- Dave Grohl – rhythm guitar, vocals
- Taylor Hawkins – drums
- Nate Mendel – bass
- Chris Shiflett – lead guitar

Additional personnel

- Pat Smear – guitar
- Rami Jaffee – keyboards
- Drew Hester – percussion

Production

- Gil Norton – production
- Adrian Bushby – engineering
- John Lousteau – engineering assistance
- Jake Davies – Pro Tools engineering
- Rich Costey – mixing
- Claudius Mittendorfer – mixing assistance
- Brian Gardner – mastering

== Charts ==
=== Weekly charts ===
Weekly chart performance for "Let It Die"
Chart (2008)	Peak position
Canada Hot 100 (Billboard)	58
Canada Rock (Billboard)	1
Quebec Airplay (ADISQ)	46
US Bubbling Under Hot 100 (Billboard)	6
US Hot Singles Sales (Billboard)	3
US Radio Songs (Billboard)	85
US Alternative Airplay (Billboard)	1
US Mainstream Rock (Billboard)	5
Venezuela Pop Rock (Record Report)	11

=== Year-end charts ===
Year-end chart performance for "Let It Die"
Chart (2008)	Position
Canada Rock (Radio & Records)	3
US Alternative Airplay (Billboard)	1
US Mainstream Rock (Billboard)	19
