= Cheer Up, Boys (Your Make Up Is Running) =

2008 single by Foo Fighters

Single by Foo Fighters

from the album Echoes, Silence, Patience & Grace
- Released: April 7, 2008
- Recorded: March–June 2007
- Genre: Alternative rock, post-grunge
- Length: 3:41
- Label: Roswell/RCA
- Songwriters: Dave Grohl; Taylor Hawkins; Nate Mendel; Chris Shiflett
- Producer: Gil Norton

Foo Fighters singles chronology
"Long Road to Ruin" (2007)	"Cheer Up, Boys (Your Make Up Is Running)" (2008)	"Let It Die" (2008)

"Cheer Up, Boys (Your Make Up Is Running)" is the third single released from the Foo Fighters' 2007 album Echoes, Silence, Patience & Grace. The single was released as a digital-only release in the UK via iTunes. No physical retail singles were released; however, promotional singles were released for radio airplay. The B-side is a cover of Paul McCartney & Wings' "Band on the Run", which was previously released on Radio 1 Established 1967.

== Reception ==
Dave Grohl commented on the song, saying "For this song, it was a working title that stuck, because that was a song that we had demoed and it sounded like this really bright, poppy, late '80s R.E.M. song that would have been off their 'Green' or something like that." AllMusic editor Stephen Thomas Erlewine says the song has a riff as nimble as those on Foo Fighters' debut album.

== Other versions ==
A live version filmed at Wembley Stadium on June 7, 2008, was released on the Live at Wembley Stadium DVD.

== Track listing ==
1. "Cheer Up, Boys (Your Make Up Is Running)" – 3:41
2. "Band on the Run" – 5:09 (Paul McCartney and Wings cover, 2007)

== Personnel ==
Personnel adapted from Echoes, Silence, Patience & Grace liner notes. (Note: The band members' instruments are not credited in the album's liner notes, except for Hawkins' background vocals. Their primary instruments are listed based on their de facto primary roles in the group.)

Foo Fighters

- Dave Grohl – lead guitar, vocals
- Taylor Hawkins – drums, background vocals
- Nate Mendel – bass
- Chris Shiflett – rhythm guitar

Additional musician

- Drew Hester - percussion

Production

- Gil Norton – production
- Adrian Bushby – engineering
- John Lousteau – engineering assistance
- Jake Davies – Pro Tools engineering
- Rich Costey – mixing
- Claudius Mittendorfer – mixing assistance
- Brian Gardner – mastering

== Charts ==
Chart (2008)	Peak position
Japan (Japan Hot 100)	95
UK Singles (OCC)	194
