= Blooddrunk (song) =

Single by Children of Bodom

from the album Blooddrunk
- Released: 27 February 2008 (Finland)
- Recorded: 2007
- Genre: Melodic death metal, thrash metal, power metal
- Length: 4:05
- Label: Spinefarm
- Songwriter: Alexi Laiho

Children of Bodom singles chronology
"Tie My Rope" (2007)	"Blooddrunk" (2008)	"Hellhounds on My Trail" (2008)

"Blooddrunk" is a 2008 single by Finnish melodic death metal band Children of Bodom, taken from their 2008 album Blooddrunk. The lyrics focus upon "self-destructive behaviour", and being addicted to hurting yourself. Written solely by Children of Bodom frontman Alexi Laiho, the song was generally well received by critics.

Directed by Sandra Marschner and produced by Katapult Filmproduktion, the accompanying music video was filmed at former Nazi barracks in Krampnitz situated near Berlin. The film is set in an abandoned ghost town; Laiho described the area as "a really creepy looking environment". "Blooddrunk" debuted at number one on the Finnish singles charts in its first week of release, and remained in the top twenty of the Finnish singles chart for six weeks following its release.

== Origins ==
According to Children of Bodom frontman Alexi Laiho, "Blooddrunk" concerns "self-destructive behaviour", and "being addicted to spilling your own blood". Laiho felt that he had hurt himself "more than ever" over the course of a two-year period (between 2005–2007), and arrived at the conclusion that he was addicted to hurting himself "so bad". When discussing the track in interviews, Laiho has made reference to the fact that he self-harmed in the past. However, Laiho has noted that the song isn't "necessarily just about cutting yourself but about other things you do to yourself and you don't know why".

One interviewer commented that the phrase "blood drunk" appears in the 2007 movie 300, although Laiho stated that he heard the phrase prior to watching the film. "I think it's just some sort of expression and it fits, you know?", Laiho observed.

== Musical structure ==
"Blooddrunk" is 4 minutes 5 seconds long. A keyboard opens the track, described by IGN critic Jim Kaz as a "gothic" "flourish". The track then "degenerates" into a set of "muscular" riffs, riffs that Kaz dubbed "frenetic". The chorus then enters, hailed by PopMatters critic Adrien Begrand as "effective". Begrand also commented that "Blooddrunk" is "chugging".

Keyboardist Janne Wirman noted that "Blooddrunk" is the first song since the group's debut album (1997's Something Wild) to feature a triplet, and felt the track was "really fresh musically" for that reason.

== Music video ==
In December 2007, Children of Bodom travelled to Berlin, Germany in order to film two music videos – for the songs "Blooddrunk" and "Hellhounds On My Trail" respectively – in support of sixth studio album Blooddrunk. Both videos were directed by Sandra Marschner, and produced by Katapult Filmproduktion. "Blooddrunk"'s music video was filmed at former Nazi barracks in Krampnitz near Berlin, an area where the Russian army was stationed prior to the reunification of Germany.

Set in an abandoned "hellhole" ghost town, Laiho described the area as "a really creepy looking environment". Laiho went on to comment that "no one has lived there for years".

On 18 February, the music video premiered on both the internet and Finnish television.

== Critical reception ==
"Blooddrunk" was released on 27 February 2008 by Spinefarm Records in Finland. In its first week of release, the single debuted at number one on the Finnish singles chart. "Blooddrunk" stayed in that position for one week, and remained in the top twenty of the Finnish singles chart for six weeks following its release. On 3 March, the single was issued in the rest of Europe. On that same day, What Records issued three limited-edition versions of the single in the United Kingdom; an enhanced CD single, a 7" vinyl single, and a 12" vinyl single picture disc. The single's enhanced CD version featured a cover of Billy Idol's "Rebel Yell", and the music video for "Blooddrunk". Limited to 1,000 copies worldwide, the 7" vinyl version included a cover of Creedence Clearwater Revival's "Lookin' Out My Back Door" as its B-side. The single's limited 12" vinyl picture disc release was distributed with 666 numbered copies, and 1,000 copies overall. A reinterpretation of Stone's "No Command" comprised the B-side, and all purchased copies came with a sticker.

Critics were generally positive when reviewing "Blooddrunk". PopMatters critic Adrien Begrand felt the track was "certain to become a live favorite".

== Formats and track listings ==
Normal CD single
No.	Title	Length
1.	"Blooddrunk"	4:05
2.	"Lookin' out My Back Door" (Creedence Clearwater Revival Cover)	2:08

UK Enhanced CD single
No.	Title	Length
1.	"Blooddrunk"	4:05
2.	"Rebel Yell" (Billy Idol Cover)	4:12
3.	"Blooddrunk" (Video)

UK Limited 7" Red Vinyl
No.	Title	Length
1.	"Blooddrunk"	4:05
2.	"Lookin' Out My Backdoor" (Creedence Clearwater Revival Cover)	2:08

UK Limited 12" Picture Disc
No.	Title	Length
1.	"Blooddrunk"	4:05
2.	"No Commands" (Stone Cover)	4:46

== Release history ==
Region	Date
Finland	27 February 2008
Europe	3 March 2008
