= Skeletons in the Closet (Children of Bodom album) =

Compilation album by Children of Bodom
- Released: 22 September 2009
- Recorded: 1998–2009
- Length: 66:01
- Label: Spinefarm

Children of Bodom chronology
Blooddrunk (2008)	Skeletons in the Closet (2009)	Relentless Reckless Forever (2011)

Professional ratings
Review scores
Source	Rating
AllMusic	2.5/5 stars

Skeletons in the Closet is the second compilation album by Finnish melodic death metal band Children of Bodom, released on 22 September 2009 through Spinefarm Records. It consists of various covers of songs, most of which have been released on other releases such as B-sides on Children of Bodom's singles. The album only contains four unreleased covers for the songs "Hell Is for Children", "Antisocial", "War Inside My Head", and "Waiting", but the previously released songs are remixed and new details can be heard. The Japanese edition is pressed in SHM-CD format.

== Track listing ==
=== European version ===
No.	Title	Writer(s)	Original artist (date)	Length
1.	"Lookin' Out My Back Door"	John Fogerty	Creedence Clearwater Revival (1970)	2:08
2.	"Hell Is for Children"	Pat Benatar; Roger Capps; Neil Giraldo	Pat Benatar (1980)	4:00
3.	"Somebody Put Something in My Drink"	Richie Ramone	Ramones (1986)	3:17
4.	"Mass Hypnosis"	Max Cavalera; Andreas Kisser; Paulo Jr.; Igor Cavalera	Sepultura (1989)	4:03
5.	"Don't Stop at the Top"	Rudolf Schenker; Klaus Meine; Herman Rarebell	Scorpions (1988)	3:24
6.	"Silent Scream"	Tom Araya; Jeff Hanneman; Kerry King	Slayer (1988)	3:18
7.	"She Is Beautiful"	Andrew W.K.	Andrew W.K. (2002)	3:26
8.	"Just Dropped In (To See What Condition My Condition Was In)"	Mickey Newbury	Kenny Rogers and the First Edition (1968)	2:39
9.	"Bed of Nails"	Alice Cooper; Desmond Child; Diane Warren	Alice Cooper (1989)	3:54
10.	"Hellion"	Blackie Lawless	W.A.S.P. (1984)	3:01
11.	"Aces High"	Steve Harris	Iron Maiden (1984)	4:29
12.	"Rebel Yell"	Billy Idol; Steve Stevens	Billy Idol (1984)	4:11
13.	"No Commands"	Roope Latvala; Janne Joutsenniemi	Stone (1988)	4:49
14.	"Antisocial"	Bernie Bonvoisin; Norbert Krief	Trust/Anthrax (1980/1988)	3:36
15.	"Talk Dirty to Me"	Bobby Dall; C.C. DeVille; Bret Michaels; Rikki Rockett	Poison (1986)	3:35
16.	"War Inside My Head"	Louiche Mayorga; Mike Muir	Suicidal Tendencies (1987)	3:25
17.	"Oops!... I Did It Again (feat. Jonna Kosonen)"	Max Martin; Rami Yacoub	Britney Spears (2000)	3:20
18.	"Waiting" (hidden track)	King Diamond	King Diamond (1996)	3:50

=== US version ===
No.	Title	Original artist (date)	Length
1.	"Lookin' out My Back Door"	Creedence Clearwater Revival (1970)	2:08
2.	"Hell Is for Children"	Pat Benatar (1980)	4:00
3.	"Somebody Put Something in My Drink"	The Ramones (1986)	3:17
4.	"Mass Hypnosis"	Sepultura (1989)	4:03
5.	"Don't Stop at the Top"	Scorpions (1988)	3:24
6.	"Silent Scream"	Slayer (1988)	3:18
7.	"Just Dropped In (To See What Condition My Condition Was In)"	Kenny Rogers (1968)	2:39
8.	"Hellion"	W.A.S.P. (1984)	3:01
9.	"Aces High"	Iron Maiden (1984)	4:29
10.	"Rebel Yell"	Billy Idol (1984)	4:11
11.	"No Commands"	Stone (1988)	4:49
12.	"Antisocial"	Trust/Anthrax (1980/1988)	3:36
13.	"Talk Dirty to Me"	Poison (1986)	3:35
14.	"Ghost Riders in the Sky"	Stan Jones (1948)	3:39
15.	"War Inside My Head"	Suicidal Tendencies (1987)	3:25
16.	"Oops!... I Did It Again (feat. Jonna Kosonen)"	Britney Spears (2000)	3:20
17.	"Waiting"	King Diamond (1996)	3:50

=== Japanese version ===
No.	Title	Original artist (date)	Length
1.	"Lookin' out My Back Door"	Creedence Clearwater Revival (1970)	2:08
2.	"Hell Is for Children"	Pat Benatar (1980)	4:00
3.	"Somebody Put Something in My Drink"	The Ramones (1986)	3:17
4.	"Don't Stop at the Top"	Scorpions (1988)	3:24
5.	"Silent Scream"	Slayer (1988)	3:18
6.	"She is Beautiful"	Andrew W.K. (2002)	3:26
7.	"Just Dropped In (To See What Condition My Condition Was In)"	Kenny Rogers (1968)	2:39
8.	"Bed of Nails"	Alice Cooper (1989)	3:54
9.	"Aces High"	Iron Maiden (1984)	4:29
10.	"Rebel Yell"	Billy Idol (1984)	4:11
11.	"No Commands"	Stone (1988)	4:49
12.	"Antisocial"	Trust/Anthrax (1980/1988)	3:36
13.	"Talk Dirty to Me"	Poison (1986)	3:35
14.	"Ghost Riders in the Sky"	Stan Jones (1948)	3:39
15.	"War Inside My Head"	Suicidal Tendencies (1987)	3:25
16.	"Oops!... I Did It Again (feat. Jonna Kosonen)"	Britney Spears (2000)	3:20
17.	"Waiting"	King Diamond (1996)	3:50

== Charts ==
Chart (2009)	Peak position
Austrian Albums Chart	63
Finnish Albums Chart	9
German Albums Chart	78
Japanese Albums Chart	67

== Personnel ==
Children of Bodom

- Alexi Laiho − lead guitar, lead vocals
- Roope Latvala − rhythm guitar, backing vocals
- Janne Wirman − keyboards
- Henkka Seppälä − bass, backing vocals
- Jaska Raatikainen − drums
- Alexander Kuoppala − rhythm guitar and backing vocals on "Mass Hypnosis", "Hellion", "No Commands", "Don't Stop at the Top", "Silent Scream", "Aces High", "Somebody Put Something in My Drink", "Rebel Yell" and "Waiting"

Guest musicians

- Nipa Ryti – bass on "Don't Stop at the Top" and "Waiting"
- Euge Valovirta – banjo on "Lookin' Out My Back Door"
- Pete Salomaa – upright bass on "Lookin' Out My Back Door"
- Kaapro Ikonen – vocals on "No Commands"
- Mikko Karmila – guitar solo on "War Inside My Head"
- Jonna Kosonen – vocals on "Oops!... I Did It Again"
- Band photos by Tomi Lauren
- Artwork and layout by Kalle Pyyhtinen
