= The Pretender (Foo Fighters song) =

2007 single by Foo Fighters

Single by Foo Fighters

from the album Echoes, Silence, Patience & Grace
- Released: August 21, 2007
- Recorded: March–June 2007
- Genre: Hard rock; post-grunge
- Length: 4:30
- Label: Roswell; RCA
- Songwriters: Dave Grohl; Taylor Hawkins; Nate Mendel; Chris Shiflett
- Producer: Gil Norton

Foo Fighters singles chronology
"Miracle" (2006)	"The Pretender" (2007)	"Long Road to Ruin" (2007)

Music video
- "The Pretender" on YouTube

"The Pretender" is a song by American rock band Foo Fighters. It was the first single from the group's 2007 album Echoes, Silence, Patience & Grace. It is one of Foo Fighters' most successful songs; peaking at number 37 on the US Billboard Hot 100 (making it their third top-40 single), only "Learn to Fly" and "Best of You" beat its position on the Billboard Hot 100.

== Musical style ==
=== Composition ===
Dave Grohl first showcased the song, which had the working title "Silver Heart", during pre-production of Echoes, Silence, Patience & Grace, but the song did not see much development. According to producer Gil Norton, "The chorus was there, but the verse and the middle hadn't been written. Not to mention the song was much slower." During a 10-day break from recordings in April 2007, Grohl listened to the monitor mixes and thought that the record needed another uptempo song, so he spent his time developing "Silver Heart". The band then recorded a demo for "The Pretender", which Norton approved, leading to the song getting a proper recording the following day. Grohl has said that the Sesame Street song "One of These Things (Is Not Like the Others)" may have subconsciously influenced his writing of the song.

Grohl described "The Pretender" as "a stomping Foo Fighters uptempo song, with a little bit of Chuck Berry in it." A hard rock and post-grunge song written in the key of A minor, it showcases the shifting dynamics which Grohl wanted to employ on Echoes, Silence, Patience & Grace, starting with a very stripped-down introduction, featuring soft guitar and vocals along with a small string section. Then comes an escalating rock sound, interrupted by breakdowns and escalations in the bridge, including a repeat of the intro. Mixing engineer Rich Costey stated that making all these dynamics work, as well as balancing the instruments, was challenging, as Grohl and drummer Taylor Hawkins always want more focus on their instruments. The amount of guitar overdubs also worried Costey – "The guitars on 'The Pretender' are quite full on, with countermelodies and so forth, and they all tend to be in the same range, so it gets quite dense. The challenge of this type of mix is to retain the power of the track, yet define a space for everything. Handling the guitar balance was a slight chore, and in comparison the drums and vocals were quite easy."

=== Meaning ===
In a 2007 interview with XFM, frontman Dave Grohl stopped short of explaining the meaning behind "The Pretender", but alluded its roots go to political unrest of the time it was written. Grohl noted: "That's the thing with lyrics, you never want to give away specifics, because it's nice for people to have their own idea or interpretation of the song. But, you know, everyone's been fucked over before and I think a lot of people feel fucked over right now and they're not getting what they were promised, and so something to do with that."

Grohl also revealed to XFM that "The Pretender" was not initially planned for the album and was conceived quickly, stating the song was written in a day.

== Reception ==
This song was number 47 on Rolling Stone's list of the 100 Best Songs of 2007. The song was a 2008 Grammy Award nominee for Best Rock Song and Record of the Year. It won the Grammy for Best Hard Rock Performance the same year. This song was also number 94 on MTV Asia's list of Top 100 Hits of 2007. The music video was nominated for a 2008 MTV Video Music Award for Best Rock Video, but lost to Linkin Park's "Shadow of the Day".

This album was the fourth consecutive Foo Fighters album to have a song reach the top of the U.S. Hot Modern Rock Tracks chart. "The Pretender" was the most densely played alternative rock song of 2007. It held the record for longest running number-one in the Modern Rock Tracks' history, beating a then-record of 16 weeks by Red Hot Chili Peppers' "Scar Tissue", Staind's "It's Been Awhile", and Green Day's "Boulevard of Broken Dreams", with 18 weeks at number one, until Muse's "Madness" reigned for 19 weeks in 2012–13, but that later got eclipsed by Portugal. The Man's "Feel It Still" in 2017 which spent 20 weeks at the number-one spot. In late 2023, for the chart's 35th anniversary, Billboard placed "The Pretender" at number seven on its ranking of the top 100 alternative hits in the chart's history. It also spent six weeks at number one on the Hot Mainstream Rock Tracks chart. It made the Triple J's Hottest 100 in Australia, placing in at number five.

== Music video ==
The music video was directed by Sam Brown. It is presented in letterbox format and heavily employs pans, zooms, and tracking shots. It consists of the band performing the song in an airplane hangar with many strip lights on the ceiling. Behind the band is a large red screen, which is thick and solid. The band is then faced by what appears to be a riot police officer, who stands behind a black line in front of the band. As the song progresses, he is joined by more riot police officers who line up at the same black line. Panning left-to-right across this lineup, each police officer is seen to have a number on his chest, which are in order counting down. As the quieter bridge begins, the video slows down and the officers charge the band. Just as the band begins the song's louder chorus, the screen suddenly explodes and a red liquid erupts from it, overwhelming the police officers, but affecting the band to a lesser extent. At the end of the video, Dave Grohl is shown slamming his guitar on the floor as he falls to his knees. The visual effects in the video were done by Mechnology Visual Effects in Burbank, California.

== Track listing ==
- 2-track CD
1. "The Pretender"
2. "If Ever"
- Maxi CD
1. "The Pretender" – 4:31
2. "Come Alive" (Demo) – 5:31
3. "If Ever" – 4:15
4. "Monkey Wrench" (Live from Hyde Park video) – 5:35
- 7"
1. "The Pretender"
2. "Bangin'"

== Personnel ==
Personnel adapted from Echoes, Silence, Patience & Grace liner notes. (Note: The band members' instruments are not credited in the album's liner notes. Their primary instruments are listed based on their de facto primary roles in the group.)

Foo Fighters

- Dave Grohl – rhythm guitar, vocals
- Taylor Hawkins – drums
- Nate Mendel – bass
- Chris Shiflett – lead guitar

Additional musicians

- The Section Quartet – string section, arranged by Audrey Riley

Production

- Gil Norton – production
- Adrian Bushby – engineering
- John Lousteau – engineering assistance
- Jake Davies – Pro Tools engineering
- Rich Costey – mixing
- Claudius Mittendorfer – mixing assistance
- Brian Gardner – mastering

== Charts ==
=== Weekly charts ===
2007–2008 weekly chart performance for "The Pretender"
Chart (2007–2008)	Peak position
Australia (ARIA)	10
Austria (Ö3 Austria Top 40)	46
Belgium (Ultratop 50 Flanders)	26
Belgium (Ultratip Bubbling Under Wallonia)	13
Canada Hot 100 (Billboard)	15
Canada Rock (Billboard)	1
Czech Republic Modern Rock (IFPI)	20
Denmark (Tracklisten)	25
Finland (Suomen virallinen lista)	20
Germany (GfK)	72
Ireland (IRMA)	11
Netherlands (Dutch Top 40)	13
Netherlands (Single Top 100)	39
New Zealand (Recorded Music NZ)	9
Norway (VG-lista)	3
Quebec Airplay (ADISQ)	26
Scottish Singles Sales (Official Charts)	6
Sweden (Sverigetopplistan)	11
Switzerland (Schweizer Hitparade)	61
UK Singles (Official Charts)	8
US Billboard Hot 100	37
US Mainstream Rock (Billboard)	1
US Alternative Airplay (Billboard)	1

2019 weekly chart performance for "The Pretender"
Chart (2019)	Position
Hungary (Single Top 40)	20

=== Year-end charts ===
2007 year-end chart performance for "The Pretender"
Chart (2007)	Position
Australia (ARIA)	58
UK Singles (OCC)	73
US Alternative Songs (Billboard)	14
US Mainstream Rock Songs (Billboard)	13

2008 year-end chart performance for "The Pretender"
Chart (2008)	Position
UK Singles (OCC)	196
US Alternative Airplay (Billboard)	2
US Mainstream Rock (Billboard)	26

=== Decade-end charts ===
Decade-end chart performance for "The Pretender"
Chart (2000–2009)	Position
US Hot Alternative Songs (Billboard)	13

== Certifications ==
Certifications and sales for "The Pretender"
Region	Certification	Certified units/sales
Australia (ARIA)	6× Platinum	420,000^{‡}
Canada (Music Canada)	Platinum	40,000^{*}
Denmark (IFPI Danmark)	Platinum	90,000^{‡}
Italy (FIMI)	Platinum	50,000^{‡}
Mexico (AMPROFON)	3× Platinum+Gold	210,000^{‡}
New Zealand (RMNZ)	4× Platinum	120,000^{‡}
Spain (Promusicae)	Gold	30,000^{‡}
United Kingdom (BPI)	3× Platinum	1,800,000^{‡}
United States (RIAA)	2× Platinum	2,000,000^{‡}
^{*} Sales figures based on certification alone.^{‡} Sales+streaming figures based on certification alone.
