= I'm Not Well =

Studio album by Black Foxxes
- Released: 19 August 2016
- Label: Spinefarm Records/Search And Destroy Records
- Producer: Adrian Bushby

Black Foxxes chronology
Pines (2014)	I'm Not Well (2016)	Reiði (2018)

Singles from I'm Not Well
- 1. "Husk" Released: 23 March 2016; 2. "I'm Not Well" Released: 17 May 2016; 3. "Whatever Lets You Cope" Released: 2 August 2016; 4. "How We Rust" Released: 28 October 2016

I'm Not Well is the first full-length studio album by English indie rock band Black Foxxes. It was released on 19 August 2016 through Spinefarm Records/Search And Destroy Records and it was produced by Adrian Bushby. The artwork was created by Daniel P. Carter, and it received a nomination at Heavy Music Awards in 2017 for Best Album Artwork.

== Background and recording ==
I'm Not Well was recorded between Assault & Battery Studios in London and Devon’s Middle Farm.

== Musical style and lyrics ==
The record has been described as raw, dark and brutally honest, with echoes of Biffy Clyro and Placebo. I'm Not Well includes the tracks previously released in the EP Pines.

The album lyrics - particularly, the title track - reflect Mark Holley's personal experiences and feelings, and the struggles of living with Crohn's disease and anxiety. He declared: "I wanted to focus on all the issues I was going through on the lead up to that album. I had only recently been diagnosed with having extreme anxiety and I was struggling massively to cope day to day. Opening up and talking about it and seeing others were going through the same things was the differential I needed to be able to get through it all."

"Bronte" is about the first time Holley went into treatment for Crohn's disease, while "Whatever Lets You Cope" is about drug addiction, as he explained. "I was on holiday with my girlfriend in a beautiful, tranquil part of the world, in Wales. And as I went out for a peaceful coastal walk, I saw this lady collapsing on a bench. As I walked past, I discovered a used needle, bottle of vodka and a belt tied round her arm (...) Drug addiction is such a cruel affliction, and to see this lady slumped over, needle having just been used with the backdrop of sheer nirvana it makes you realize sometimes people just need that release. I’ll never forget that moment."

== Release and promotion ==
On 23 March 2016, Black Foxxes released a first single, 'Husk", and a corresponding video directed by Daniel Broadley.

On 17 May 2016, the single "I'm Not Well" was released, along with a music video.

On 2 August 2016, they revealed a third single, "Whatever Lets You Cope", and a video as well.

On 28 October 2016, a fourth single was announced, "How We Rust".

== Critical reception ==
Professional ratings
Aggregate scores
Source	Rating
Metacritic	82/100
Review scores
Source	Rating
Dead Press!	9/10 stars
Drowned In Sound	10/10
Louder Sound	3.5/5 stars
Rocksound	6/10

The album received generally positive reviews: the critics admired the maturity and honesty of the contents, and the release has been defined "an intimate and introspective release (...) an outpour of palpable emotion that listeners can relate to and feel all the better for finding." It was appreciated also how Black Foxxes managed to distinguish themselves from the mainstream alternative music scene, with "searing vocals, delicate and cracking with emotion one minute and screaming the next. Dynamic and layered guitar parts and a strong rhythm section."

At the same time, it has been largely noted how the lyrics and dark sound contributed to create "a mud-ride of delicate depression-pop" reminiscent of emo and grunge. The band liked this definition and ended up describing their music as depression-pop.

== Track listing ==
No.	Title	Length
1.	"I'm Not Well"	3:51
2.	"Husk"	2:38
3.	"Whatever Lets You Cope"	3:56
4.	"How We Rust"	4:04
5.	"River"	5:12
6.	"Maple Summer"	4:38
7.	"Bronte"	4:05
8.	"Waking Up"	3:18
9.	"Home"	2:43
10.	"Slow Jams Forever"	4:07
11.	"Pines"	5:04
Total length:		43:00

== Personnel ==
- Mark Holley - vocals, guitar
- Tristan Jane - bass guitar
- Anthony (Ant) Thornton - drums
