= Smile Pretty for the Devil =

Single by Children Of Bodom

from the album Blooddrunk
- Released: 14 November 2008
- Genre: Melodic death metal, power metal
- Length: 7:29
- Label: Spinefarm
- Songwriter: Alexi Laiho

Children Of Bodom singles chronology
"Hellhounds on My Trail" (2008)	"Smile Pretty for the Devil" (2008)	"Lookin' Out My Back Door" (2009)

"Smile Pretty for the Devil" is a single from the album Blooddrunk by Finnish melodic death metal band Children of Bodom. A video was shot for this song.

== Track listing ==
No.	Title	Writer(s)	Length
1.	"Smile Pretty for the Devil"	Alexi Laiho	3:54
2.	"Talk Dirty to Me" (Poison cover)	Bret Michaels, Rikki Rockett, Bobby Dall, C.C. DeVille	3:35

== Chart performance ==
Chart (2008)	Peak position
UK Rock Chart	1

== See also ==
- List of UK Rock & Metal Singles Chart number ones of 2008
