= Long Road to Ruin =

Single by Foo Fighters

from the album Echoes, Silence, Patience & Grace
- Released: December 3, 2007
- Recorded: March–June 2007
- Genre: Post-grunge, alternative rock
- Length: 3:44
- Label: Roswell/RCA
- Songwriters: Dave Grohl; Taylor Hawkins; Nate Mendel; Chris Shiflett
- Producer: Gil Norton

Foo Fighters singles chronology
"The Pretender" (2007)	"Long Road to Ruin" (2007)	"Cheer Up, Boys (Your Make Up Is Running)" (2008)

Music video
- "Long Road to Ruin" on YouTube

"Long Road to Ruin" is the second single from the Foo Fighters' sixth studio album Echoes, Silence, Patience & Grace. The music video was released on November 1, 2007, with the single released on December 3, 2007. The video features an appearance by actress Rashida Jones, and was directed by Jesse Peretz, who had previously collaborated with the band for "Big Me", "Learn to Fly", "The One", and "Low".

== Commercial release ==
"Long Road to Ruin" topped the Billboard Modern Rock Tracks chart for seven consecutive weeks and reached number two on the Mainstream Rock Tracks in early 2008. It peaked at number 89 on the Billboard Hot 100. The song's number-one position on the Modern Rock chart gave the Foo Fighters a record-setting feat by becoming the first act to reach number one on the chart in each of four consecutive years.

In the United Kingdom, "Long Road to Ruin" peaked in the top 40 of the UK Singles Chart and number one on the UK Rock Chart.

"Long Road to Ruin" was the most played rock song in Canada in 2008.

== Music video ==
The music video of the song, directed by Jesse Peretz (who also has directed previous Foo Fighters videos "Big Me" and "Learn To Fly"), is a comedic spoof of a stereotypical 1970s-era hospital soap opera (General Hospital in particular), and is essentially a "show within a show". As seen in the opening credit sequence, the Foo Fighters portray the actors who in turn portray the show's characters. Grohl plays "Davy Grolton", who stars as the main doctor, "Hansom Davidoff". Drummer Taylor Hawkins plays "Ty Hawkstone" ("Les Groper", Davidoff's womanizing colleague). Guitarist Chris Shiflett plays "Christopher Mishomotohama" ("Little Jimmy", a severely injured child). Bassist Nate Mendel plays "Ned Bender" ("Saul Goode", the show's shady antagonist). Actress Rashida Jones guest stars as "Racinda Jules" ("Susan Belfontaine", the doctor's love interest).

In order to avoid confusion with the soap opera (also entitled "Long Road to Ruin") and the "real world", the scenes in the soap opera have brown tones to make it more vintage, while the real world retains normal color. There are various accidents and rifts on-stage (a fight between the cast, Grolton inadvertently hitting Jules in the face). Backstage, Grolton's cast mates read a magazine about him becoming a rock star, and later place his debut album on a dartboard and throw darts at it. Upset, Grolton goes outside, only to find screaming teenage girls who want his autograph. After wiping away tears, he accommodates and interacts with them.

The video then cuts to a concert in a mall where he fronts "The Davy Grolton Band" and performs the song. The band is also portrayed by the other Foo Fighter members, in attire appropriate of the era. The scene is inter-cut with flashbacks about Jules. While singing, he sees her amidst the audience filled with the ravenous girls, but she leaves after realizing he has spotted her. He ends the performance to give chase with the fans behind him, but when he finally finds her, she has driven off. Grolton becomes hysterical before continuing his pursuit.

The video is interspersed throughout with scenes of Grolton driving in a car, wistfully singing the song. The final scene has him intentionally driving off a cliff in a typical 1970s television or movie death scene, with the vehicle bursting into flames during the fall. Grolton is clearly in an open-top Jaguar E-Type, but in what was likely an intentional continuity error (or the fact that the E-Type was too valuable to destroy), the vehicle that's crashed appears to be a 1990s Porsche 911. The stock footage would later be used at the end of the video for "White Limo", a track from the following album.

An alternative version of the video, consisting of the Davy Grolton Band performance in its entirety, is available on Entertainment Weekly's website, and available to buy on iTunes.

== Track listings ==
- 2-track CD
1. "Long Road to Ruin"
2. "Seda"
- Maxi CD
1. "Long Road to Ruin"
2. "Keep the Car Running" (Arcade Fire cover, live from Brighton August 18, 2007)
3. "Big Me" (Live from Wal-Mart soundcheck)
4. "Long Road to Ruin" (video)
- 7"
1. "Long Road to Ruin"
2. "Holiday in Cambodia" (Dead Kennedys cover, live from MTV Video Music Awards 2007, featuring Serj Tankian)

== Personnel ==
Personnel adapted from Echoes, Silence, Patience & Grace liner notes. (Note: The band members' instruments are not credited in the album's liner notes. Their primary instruments are listed based on their de facto primary roles in the group.)

Foo Fighters

- Dave Grohl – rhythm guitar, vocals
- Taylor Hawkins – drums
- Nate Mendel – bass
- Chris Shiflett – lead guitar

Additional musicians

- Drew Hester – percussion
- Rami Jaffee – keyboards
- Oliver Allgood – lute

Production

- Gil Norton – production
- Adrian Bushby – engineering
- John Lousteau – engineering assistance
- Jake Davies – Pro Tools engineering
- Rich Costey – mixing
- Claudius Mittendorfer – mixing assistance
- Brian Gardner – mastering

== Charts ==
=== Weekly charts ===
Weekly chart performance for "Long Road to Ruin"
Chart (2007)	Peak position
Australia (ARIA)	38
Belgium (Ultratip Bubbling Under Flanders)	6
Canada Hot 100 (Billboard)	43
Canada Rock (Billboard)	1
Germany (GfK)	79
Japan (Japan Hot 100)	64
New Zealand (Recorded Music NZ)	21
Scotland Singles (Official Charts)	19
Sweden (Sverigetopplistan)	23
Quebec Airplay (ADISQ)	26
UK Singles (Official Charts)	35
UK Rock & Metal (Official Charts)	1
US Billboard Hot 100	89
US Adult Alternative Airplay (Billboard)	21
US Mainstream Rock (Billboard)	2
US Alternative Airplay (Billboard)	1

=== Year-end charts ===
Year-end chart performance for "Long Road to Ruin"
Chart (2008)	Position
Canada Rock (Radio & Records)	1
US Alternative Airplay (Billboard)	7
US Mainstream Rock (Billboard)	13

== Certifications ==
Certifications for "Long Road to Ruin"
Region	Certification	Certified units/sales
Australia (ARIA)	Platinum	70,000^{‡}
New Zealand (RMNZ)	Gold	15,000^{‡}
United Kingdom (BPI)	Silver	200,000^{‡}
^{‡} Sales+streaming figures based on certification alone.
