= Blooddrunk =

Studio album by Children of Bodom
- Released: 7 April 2008
- Recorded: October–December 2007
- Studios: Petrax Studio; Finnvox
- Genres: Melodic death metal; thrash metal; power metal
- Length: 36:49
- Label: Spinefarm
- Producer: Mikko Karmila

Children of Bodom chronology
Chaos Ridden Years (2006)	Blooddrunk (2008)	Skeletons in the Closet (2009)

Singles from Blooddrunk
- 1. "Blooddrunk" Released: 27 February 2008; 2. "Hellhounds on My Trail" Released: 9 June 2008; 3. "Smile Pretty for the Devil" Released: 14 November 2008

Professional ratings
Review scores
Source	Rating
About.com	4/5 stars
AllMusic	4.0/5 stars
IGN	8.2/10
Revolver	5/5 stars

Blooddrunk is the sixth studio album by Finnish melodic death metal band Children of Bodom, released on 7 April 2008 through Spinefarm Records. The album includes a re-recorded version single for "Tie My Rope". Various editions feature one or two cover songs as bonus tracks. The limited edition digipak version of the album includes a bonus DVD with 5.1 surround mixes of all songs and the video and making-of for "Blooddrunk". It sold 20,000 copies during its first week of release.

The band recorded a cover of the Suicidal Tendencies song "War Inside My Head" during the recording sessions for this album, but the song was not released on Blooddrunk. The song was released on the cover album Skeletons in the Closet together with two new covers plus some old ones as well. The song "Done With Everything, Die For Nothing" is a playable song in Guitar Hero 5, which some players consider to be one of the game's harder songs. The album includes more thrash metal than its predecessors.

== Production ==
While writing and recording the album, Alexi Laiho had stated he felt very aggressive, and as a consequence the songs would be faster and "thrashier" than the songs displayed on their previous release, Are You Dead Yet?. He notified fans, however, that certain parts of the album would also be more progressive, as heard on "LoBodomy". The lyrics cover similar territory as previous releases.

== Release ==
The first single was the title track, which was released in Finland on 27 February 2008 and features the cover song "Lookin' Out My Back Door" as a B-side. The videos for "Blooddrunk" and "Hellhounds on My Trail" were shot in Berlin, Germany, in December 2007. Blooddrunk entered the Billboard 200 at number 22, making it the band's highest charted album thus far in their career, and the third highest death or black metal recording chart in the USA, just behind Dethklok's debut The Dethalbum and second album Dethalbum II.

The band streamed "Blooddrunk" on their MySpace page a week before its release.

The album went gold in Finland on pre-orders alone, and topped the Finnish charts beating its nearest rival in sales by 7 to 1. But the album did have a reasonably negative reaction from their long-term fans, many of which disliked the band's new sound and style.

== Track listing ==
All tracks are written by Alexi Laiho except where noted.

No.	Title	Length
1.	"Hellhounds on My Trail"	4:00
2.	"Blooddrunk"	4:05
3.	"LoBodomy" (Alexi Laiho, Kimberly Goss)	4:25
4.	"One Day You Will Cry"	4:05
5.	"Smile Pretty for the Devil"	3:54
6.	"Tie My Rope"	4:14
7.	"Done with Everything, Die for Nothing"	3:31
8.	"Banned from Heaven"	5:05
9.	"Roadkill Morning"	3:33

Japanese version bonus tracks
No.	Title	Length
1.	"Ghostriders in the Sky" (Stan Jones cover)	3:37
2.	"Just Dropped In (To See What Condition My Condition Was In)" (Mickey Newbury cover)	2:38

UK bonus tracks
No.	Title	Length
1.	"Ghostriders in the Sky" (Stan Jones cover)	3:37
2.	"Lookin' out My Back Door" (Creedence Clearwater Revival cover)	2:08
3.	"Aces High" (Iron Maiden cover)	4:28

== Personnel ==
Children of Bodom

- Alexi Laiho – lead guitar, lead vocals
- Roope Latvala – rhythm guitar, backing vocals, guitar solo on "Banned from Heaven"
- Henkka Seppälä – bass, backing vocals
- Janne Wirman – keyboards
- Jaska Raatikainen – drums

Production

- Produced, recorded, and mixed by Mikko Karmila
- Vocals recorded by Peter Tägtgren
- Keyboards recorded by Janne Wirman
- Mastered by Mika Jussila
- Kimberly Goss – lyrics on "LoBodomy"
- Cover art and photos by Jussi Hyttinen/Kerosin
- Layout by Miikka Tikka and Jussi Hyttinen

== Charts ==
Chart (2008)	Peak position
Australian Albums Chart	48
Austrian Albums Chart	19
Belgium Albums Chart	93
Finnish Albums Chart	1
French Albums Chart	161
German Albums Chart	10
Italian Albums Chart	65
Japanese Albums Chart	12
Netherlands Albums Chart	94
Norway Albums Chart	25
Swedish Albums Chart	28
Swiss Albums Chart	50
UK Albums Chart	44
US Billboard 200	22
US Hard Rock Albums	3
