= 2008 in British music =

This is a summary of 2008 in music in the United Kingdom.

== Events ==
- 31 January – Laura Attwood of the King Edward VI School in Morpeth wins the second Eileen Bowler Award.
- 20 February – The 2008 BRIT Awards ceremony is hosted by Ozzy, Sharon, Kelly and Jack Osbourne, at Earls Court in London.
- 26 February – The Return of the Spice Girls tour comes to a close in Toronto.
- 28 February – The Shockwaves NME Awards 2008 ceremony is held at The O_{2} in London. Winners include The Enemy, The Killers, Klaxons, Manic Street Preachers and Radiohead.
- 1 March – The X Factor finalist Andy Abraham's song "Even If" wins the BBC's Eurovision: Your Decision 2008 show, and is thus chosen to represent the UK in the Eurovision Song Contest 2008 final in Belgrade, Serbia.
- 31 March – theJazz radio station stops broadcasting.
- 3 May – Girls Aloud begin their Tangled Up Tour in Belfast, UK.
- 8 May – The Classical BRIT Awards ceremony is hosted by Myleene Klass.
- 10–11 May – The Give It A Name 2008 festival is held at Earls Court, London, UK.
- 24 May – Andy Abraham represents the UK in the Eurovision Song Contest 2008 final in Belgrade, Serbia. The UK entry receives just fourteen points and comes joint last, raising questions over the United Kingdom's future in the contest.
- 3 July – Opening of the O2 Wireless Festival in Hyde Park, London, UK.
- 11–13 July – The 2008 T in the Park festival takes place at Balado, in Perth and Kinross, Scotland. Headlining acts included The Verve, Rage Against the Machine, R.E.M., and the Kaiser Chiefs.
- 25 September – Former Beatle Paul McCartney performs at Tel Aviv park, his first performance in Israel since The Beatles were banned from the country in 1965.
- 1 October – the Society for the Promotion of New Music merges with the British Music Information Centre (BMIC), the Contemporary Music Network and the Sonic Arts Network to create a new organisation to promote contemporary Music in the UK called Sound and Music.
- 1–9 November – The Southbank Centre in London presents "Klang: A Tribute to Stockhausen", a festival curated by Oliver Knussen, with a series of concerts focusing on works from the composer's last decade, including the world premieres of Urantia and Zodiac for Orchestra, as well as late-night performances, lectures, and master classes.
- 6 November – Michael Tilson Thomas makes his Philadelphia Orchestra subscription-concert conducting debut.
- 23 November – Richey Edwards, original guitarist with Manic Street Preachers is officially declared "presumed dead", having been missing since February 1995.
- 29 November – The premiere of Judith Bingham's Shakespeare Requiem takes place in Leeds Town Hall.
- 9 December – Damon Albarn and Graham Coxon say that Blur will reunite for a concert at Hyde Park on 3 July 2009. Tickets for the concert sell out within two minutes of release, and Blur announce another date on 2 July 2009.
- 13 December – Alexandra Burke wins the fifth series of The X Factor. JLS are named runner-ups, while Eoghan Quigg and Diana Vickers finish in third and fourth place respectively.

== Classical music ==
- Peter Maxwell Davies – A Hymn to the Spirit of Fire
- Karl Jenkins – Stabat Mater
- Michael Nyman – Yamamoto Perpetuo for Solo Flute
- John Tavener – Requiem
- Graham Waterhouse – Bright Angel

== Opera ==
- Harrison Birtwistle – The Minotaur
- Andy Vores – No Exit

== Music awards ==
=== Brit Awards ===
- British Male Solo Artist: Mark Ronson
- British Female Solo Artist: Kate Nash
- British Group: Arctic Monkeys
- MasterCard British Album: Arctic Monkeys – Favourite Worst Nightmare
- British Single: Take That – "Shine"
- British Breakthrough Act: Mika
- British Live Act: Take That
- International Male Solo Artist: Kanye West
- International Female Solo Artist: Kylie Minogue
- International Group: Foo Fighters
- International Album: Foo Fighters – Echoes, Silence, Patience & Grace
- Critic's Choice: Adele
- Outstanding Contribution to Music: Paul McCartney
- Male of the Year: Sir Colin Davis
- Female of the Year: Anna Netrebko
- Young British Classical Performer: Nicola Benedetti
- Album of the Year: Blake – Blake
- Soundtrack of the Year: Blood Diamond – James Newton Howard
- Critics' Award: Steven Isserlis – Bach: Cello Suites
- Outstanding Contribution: Andrew Lloyd Webber

=== Popjustice £20 Music Prize ===
The 2008 Popjustice £20 Music Prize was awarded to Girls Aloud – "Call the Shots"

=== Record of the Year ===
- Nickelback – "Rockstar"

=== British Composer Awards ===
- Chamber – Joe Cutler
- Choral – Michael Zev Gordon
- Sonic Art – Janek Schaefer
- Instrumental Solo or Duo – Judith Bingham
- Orchestral – Luke Bedford
- Stage Works – Jonathan Dove
- Vocal – Howard Skempton

=== Ivor Novello Awards ===
- Best Song Musically & Lyrically: Amy Winehouse – Love is a Losing Game
- PRS Most Performed Work: Take That – "Shine"
- Album: Radiohead – In Rainbows
- Songwriter of the Year – Mika
- International Achievement – Phil Collins

== Deaths ==
- 30 January – Miles Kington, bassist, 66
- 28 February – Mike Smith, singer and producer (The Dave Clark Five), 64 (pneumonia)
- 12 March – Alun Hoddinott, composer, 78
- 21 March – John Noble, baritone, 77
- 24 March – Neil Aspinall, music industry executive, 66 (lung cancer)
- 29 March – Allan Ganley, jazz drummer, 77
- 15 April – Brian Davison, drummer (The Nice), 65
- 24 April – Tristram Cary, composer, 82
- 25 April – Humphrey Lyttelton, jazz musician and radio presenter, 86
- 29 April – Micky Waller, drummer, 66
- 17 May – Wilfrid Mellers, musicologist and composer, 94
- 28 May – Danny Moss, jazz saxophonist, 80
- 30 May – Campbell Burnap, jazz trombonist and broadcaster, 68 (cancer)
- 1 July – Mel Galley, guitarist (Whitesnake, Trapeze, Finders Keepers, and Phenomena), 60
- 7 July – Hugh Mendl, record producer, 88
- 14 August – Lita Roza, singer, 82
- 7 September – Peter Glossop, opera singer, 80
- 10 September – Vernon Handley, conductor, 77
- 12 September – Marjorie Thomas, contralto, 85
- 15 September – Richard Wright, keyboardist (Pink Floyd), 65
- 10 October – Dave Wright (The Troggs), 64
- 11 October – Russ Hamilton, singer, 78
- 13 October – Gus Chambers, vocalist, 52
- 4 November – Alan Hazeldine, conductor and pianist, 60
- 12 November – Mitch Mitchell, drummer (The Jimi Hendrix Experience), 62
- 23 November
  - Richard Hickox, conductor, 60 (dissecting thoracic aneurysm)
  - Richey Edwards, guitarist (Manic Street Preachers) (legally dead, disappeared in 1995 aged 27)
- 24 November – Michael Lee, drummer (The Cult), 39 (epileptic seizure)
- 15 December – Davey Graham, guitarist, 68

== See also ==
- 2008 in British radio
- 2008 in British television
- 2008 in the United Kingdom
- List of British films of 2008
