= Echoes, Silence, Patience & Grace =

Studio album by Foo Fighters
- Released: September 25, 2007
- Recorded: March–June 2007
- Studio: 606 West (Los Angeles)
- Genres: Alternative rock; post-grunge; hard rock
- Length: 51:12
- Labels: Roswell; RCA
- Producer: Gil Norton

Foo Fighters chronology
Skin and Bones (2006)	Echoes, Silence, Patience & Grace (2007)	Greatest Hits (2009)

Singles from Echoes, Silence, Patience & Grace
- 1. "The Pretender" Released: August 21, 2007; 2. "Long Road to Ruin" Released: December 3, 2007; 3. "Cheer Up, Boys (Your Make Up Is Running)" Released: April 7, 2008; 4. "Let It Die" Released: June 24, 2008

Echoes, Silence, Patience & Grace is the sixth studio album by American rock band Foo Fighters, released on September 25, 2007, through Roswell and RCA Records. The album is noted for a blend of regular rock and acoustic tracks with shifting dynamics, which emerged from the variety of styles employed on the demos the band produced. It also marks the second time the band worked with producer Gil Norton, whom frontman Dave Grohl brought to fully explore the potential of his compositions and have a record that sounded different from their previous work. Grohl tried to focus on songs with messages that resonated with his audience, writing reflective lyrics that drew inspiration from the birth of his daughter.

Critical reception to Echoes, Silence, Patience & Grace was mostly positive, with praise to the sonic variety and songwriting, though some reviewers found the record inconsistent and uninspired. The album topped the charts in the United Kingdom, Australia, New Zealand and Austria, and had three successful singles, "The Pretender", "Long Road to Ruin" and "Let It Die". Echoes, Silence, Patience & Grace was nominated for five Grammy Awards, winning Best Rock Album, and was also awarded the Brit Award of Best International Album.

== Background and recording ==
The tour for the Foo Fighters' fifth album, In Your Honor, had both acoustic and electric shows to fit the song variety in that record. Frontman Dave Grohl discussed this with RCA Music Group president Clive Davis, on how "it'd be so cool" if the Foo Fighters were the band that did those different shows that appealed to specific audiences "and they wouldn't necessarily have to go to both", to which Davis replied that "you can do both together". Grohl took this advice when composing his following album. Grohl added that "we didn't plan the new album to be half rock and half acoustic", picking the songs the band considered the best, with "demos which ranged from psycho fucking Nomeansno to sloppy, Tom Petty country to fucking piano-driven songs".

"We haven't been ready to write a record like this until now. I know that Dave wouldn't have been comfortable putting violins on a song before. But for whatever reasons, it just felt like the right time to explore those things now. The last record, obviously, was half heavy stuff, half acoustic songs. So it really was like two sides of the coin. It sounds obvious, but this time around we weren't afraid of incorporating everything into one song if it felt right."

— Taylor Hawkins regarding the album's sound

Since Grohl felt the songs were different from the band's previous input and "had the potential to be something great", he considered that instead of doing something like the last three albums, the band had to go out of "our own comfort zone" and "needed someone to push us out of there". So Grohl decided to work again with Gil Norton, who produced the band's second album The Colour and the Shape, citing how Norton taught the band of the importance of pre-production and refining the composition, and claiming Norton's "unconventional" approach "seems to capture the best of this band", considering that with him "we're not going to do a straightforward AC/DC record, he's gonna make it different".

Preparation was extensive: first Grohl had his usual start-off by developing demos with drummer Taylor Hawkins, but for the first time Grohl tried to input vocals and lyrics in this early composition stage. After rounding up composition with guitarist Chris Shiflett and bassist Nate Mendel, Grohl spent two weeks with Norton discussing "arrangements, harmony and melody" and reducing the song ideas, and then the band spent four weeks rehearsing, playing "a song a day, from noon to midnight". Hawkins stated that "we basically played each of these songs 100 different times, trying every little thing every different way" and that it was the first time since The Colour and the Shape "that Dave had to deal with someone in the room questioning all his ideas", given the more laid-back approach of previous producer Nick Raskulinecz. Grohl claimed the choices were for the "most powerful, dramatic songs", and that there was an effort to "make everything sound as natural as possible – just like on the albums we grew up listening to", citing 1970s artists such as Neil Young and Wings as a major influence. Shiflett added that for the first time he played lead guitar in some tracks while Grohl "usually works out all the bits" of composition.

Recording began in March 2007 at Studio 606 in Dave Grohl's Virginia home's basement (the studio has since been moved to Northridge, California). As the band took a ten-day break in April, Grohl thought that the record needed another uptempo song, so he spent his time developing an unfinished song that became "The Pretender". The sessions wrapped in mid-June, and for the first time the band did not feel the need to rerecord any song. Grohl stated that while In Your Honor was a double album because he felt it would be "schizophrenic" to alternate between loud and acoustic songs, Norton helped on sequencing the tracks into "an album that makes sense".

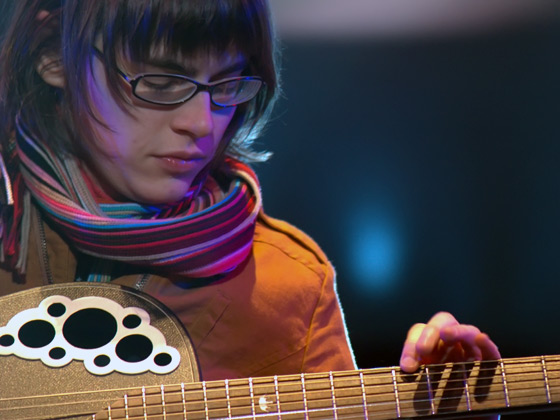
Kaki King is featured in "Ballad of the Beaconsfield Miners".

The album features the Foo Fighters' first instrumental, "Ballad of the Beaconsfield Miners". It was written by Grohl after meeting with one of the miners involved in the Beaconsfield mine collapse who requested an iPod with In Your Honor in it during the incident. As Grohl was moved by this action, he decided to "write something just to dedicate to him that night because he definitely seemed like a hero", and later promised to include the instrumental on the album. The album version features Kaki King, whom Grohl invited to record the song as she was visiting Studio 606. Grohl later said that "I showed it to her once, and she shredded 10 times better than I ever played it". Another guest was guitarist Pat Smear, who had been a band member from 1995 to 1998, and a guest musician on the tour for In Your Honor. Smear, who has since been reinstated as a full-on member, described his participation as "the oddest recording experience I had with Foo Fighters" given he had no input in composition and was "going in and playing on a song that was already written". This is their first Foo Fighters' album, since The Colour and the Shape (1997) to feature Smear, before officially rejoining the band for their next album, Wasting Light in 2011.

== Composition ==
"The Pretender"
Sample of the album's lead single "The Pretender", showcasing the album's shifting dynamics with a stripped-down intro that shifts into an electric hard rock sound.

Echoes, Silence, Patience & Grace offers a mix of both electric and acoustic songs, which Grohl likened to the band growing older and "comfortable with all kinds of music" instead of just focusing on straight rock songs, saying that listening to the album he felt like "we've gotten over our insecurities, because it presents us in a way that we probably hid in the past." Grohl also stated that "the idea now is to step up and make [The Zombies'] Odessey and Oracle" - the album he claimed to have listened the most during production - and that "it has always been my dream to mix Steely Dan with Nomeansno." Amidst the number of heavier tracks and themes Grohl decided to include the song "Cheer Up, Boys (Your Make Up Is Running)", described as "the most light-hearted, melodic song of all" which "seemed like a little ray of hope in the middle of all this despair." Grohl added that there was a bigger focus on melodies even in heavier tracks such as "The Pretender", "Let It Die" and "Erase/Replace", and that album closer "Home", a ballad featuring Grohl on the piano, was "the best song I've ever written".

The songs of the album are noted for their changing dynamics – with "middle sections [that] turn into this mass orchestrated swarm and ridiculous time signatures" which include musical references to 1970s soft rock bands such as Wings, Eagles and Bread - summed by Hawkins by saying the band "wanted to make sure that everything 'built' on this record, that each instrument started somewhere and went somewhere else in the course of a song". The drummer attributed this to the acoustic tour leading the band to "shed some of the fear of incorporating mellower stuff with the heavy stuff", and Grohl added that "we wanted the stops to be pin-drop silent before exploding. If we had a beautiful melody, we'd throw a fucking string quartet in there. So we did everything we could to really magnify all those elements and that was fun. Usually you have a few parameters you're afraid to pass but, this time, there was no fear of going too far." Mix engineer Rich Costey added that his work to "preserve what [the band] had done to a fairly large degree" with "balancing and rides to get the dynamics to happen" was difficult given the sonic variety of Echoes, which went from "[the Foo Fighters'] endless walls of guitar overdubs, almost like a swarm of bees" to string quartets: "The challenge of this type of mix is to retain the power of the track, yet define a space for everything."

"Most people think the world begins with their birth and ends with their death, but at some point your realise there's a much larger world out there that will continue existing long after you have made your exit. So I started to take in the big picture, and these realisations had an influence on the new album. There are songs about birth, death and life because my perception of these things has changed radically."

— Dave Grohl on the album's lyrics

As the acoustic tour made Grohl realize "we were making music worth listening to, rather than music made for pummelling the person next to you" he decided to give more importance to the lyrics and "have a connection with the crowd in front of us", considering that among the many compositions the band made on pre-production "the ones that stand out are the ones that say something". So for the first time the lyrics started being written before recording begun, with Grohl stating that he "sat in the back of the studio and just wrote every day for about 14 hours a day." Most of the lyrics of the album deal with themes of birth, death and life, which Grohl attributed to the birth of his daughter Violet, considering that having a child "changes your entire outlook on the world", and that he was suddenly more emotional - "So when you're writing music with that in mind or that in your heart, everything just blooms into this fucking incredibly colourful, colourful feeling." Helped by the extensive lyrical preparation, the lyrics also tried to show more of Grohl's feelings, "those things that you've always wanted to do or always wanted to say", with Hawkins adding that he could not listen to "Stranger Things Have Happened" as "I'm one of his best friends, and the last thing I want to do is read a love letter to his wife or whoever it is."

== Packaging ==
The cover art was made by Invisible Creature, and features a combination between an on ship Torpedo (WWII MK15) and an (805) vacuum tube to juxtapose the weapon "with another object that traditionally wasn’t associated with war or violence". The remainder of the album sleeve has similar juxtapositions of objects "that reflected the album's tone of life and mortality".

The album's title comes from a lyric on the album's final song, "Home". Grohl stated that as he struggled to think of a title given the musical variety of the album, even considering the title "The One With That Song On It"; regarding the chosen title, Grohl "thought it was nice because it's open to interpretation and it's a beautiful title and I think the album is beautiful in its diversity and its melody and its musicality – it goes from delicate acoustic moments to the heaviest shit we’ve ever done."

== Release and promotion ==
The album's first single, "The Pretender", had a forty-second preview released on a cross-promotional campaign with rock radio stations in July 2007, and eventually saw its debut on August 3, 2007 at ESPN's broadcast of the X Games XIII. It was released for music download and for radio play in August 2007, with a CD single coming out on September 17, 2007. "Long Road to Ruin" was released as the second single in December 2007. In 2008, "Cheer Up, Boys (Your Make Up Is Running)" was issued as a download single in the UK, with "Let It Die" being picked instead for the United States. All three North American singles topped Billboard's Modern Rock Tracks charts, making it only the ninth album in history to spawn three number one hits on this chart, and "The Pretender" set a record by spending eighteen weeks at the summit.

Echoes, Silence, Patience & Grace was released on September 24, 2007. Pre-orders through iTunes were awarded with a free download of "The Pretender", advance access to tickets through Ticketmaster, and the bonus tracks "Seda" and "Once and For All". The album was also issued as a double vinyl record.

The promotional tour begun in September 2007, after some concerts in the United Kingdom during the summer, and lasted until Fall 2008. While the back-up band compiled for the In Your Honor tour – guitarist Pat Smear, keyboardist Rami Jaffee, violinist Jessy Greene, and percussionist Drew Hester – remained to perform complex songs such as "Come Alive", a few tracks had more stripped-down arrangements.

"Home" was used in the TV shows Brothers & Sisters, One Tree Hill, Private Practice, Bosch, 911 Season 5 Episode 7 and in the 2015 animated movie Shaun the Sheep Movie.

== Critical reception ==
Professional ratings
Aggregate scores
Source	Rating
Metacritic	71/100
Review scores
Source	Rating
AllMusic	3/5 stars
Entertainment Weekly	A
The Guardian	4/5 stars
Pitchfork	4.2/10
PopMatters	4/10
Q	4/5 stars
Robert Christgau	B
Rolling Stone	3.5/5 stars
Spin	6/10
Sputnikmusic	2.5/5 stars

Echoes, Silence, Patience & Grace was met with positive reviews. At Metacritic, which assigns a normalized rating out of 100 to reviews from mainstream critics, the album has received an average score of 71, based on 30 reviews, indicating generally favorable reviews.

Writing for Entertainment Weekly, Tom Sinclair considered that while the record was not ground-breaking, "the Foos have found a way to create their own archetype, with an instinctive feel for what constitutes a killer song", and praised "how damn near flawless the tone of the whole set feels". Rolling Stone's David Fricke praised the sonic variety, described by him as "an anthology of strong new songs by a great bunch of bands, all calling themselves Foo Fighters". Jessica Letkemann of Billboard was acceptive of the "delicious sundown grooves" of the quieter piece and "the Foos' usual soft-louder-loudest 'radio friendly unit shifters'" - referencing a track of Nirvana's In Utero – while considering "Home" the only disappointing track. Robert Christgau rated the album a B, describing it as a "candid attempt to recapitulate Nirvana Mark II's 10-year-old triumph, The Colour and the Shape". Henrik Holmgren of Melodic praised the production of the album and felt that Grohl's singing "gets better and better with every record." Dave Simpson of The Guardian called Echoes, Silence, Patience & Grace the band's "most accomplished album", praising the composition and saying that "Gil Norton's stunning production can't disguise the raw humanity beneath the sheen".

A few critics considered the album not as inspired as the band's previous work. Kyle Anderson of Spin wrote that "two-thirds of these tracks sound a lot like songs Grohl has done before", considering that album's strengths came from "the handful of songs that deviate from the wallop 'n' wail template". Allmusic reviewer Stephen Thomas Erlewine also felt the rock songs were not as remarkable "compared to the almost effortlessly engaging melodies of the softer songs," ultimately describing Echoes, Silence, Patience & Grace as "just another Foo Fighters album instead of the consolidation of strengths that it was intended to be". Pitchfork's Adam Moerder considered that the album "feels like a retread" and that the band was "sounding less and less relatable", with ineffective acoustic tracks and rock songs that "sound cold and detached compared to heart-wrenching Foo pop gems like 'Big Me' or 'Everlong'". While Sputnikmusic reviewer John Hanson was accepting of the rock songs, where he felt "the boys are most comfortable," he considered that the songwriting "has just become stale" and ultimately described Echoes, Silence, Patience & Grace as "extremely boring and uninspired". PopMatters' Josh Timmermann was very critical of the overtly serious tone of the record compared to the lighthearted work the band had done before, joking that the title of "Cheer Up, Boys" "sounds like the suggestion of a concerned fan for a band he or she used to actually care about."

=== Accolades ===
At the 50th Grammy Awards, Echoes, Silence, Patience & Grace won the Grammy Award for Best Rock Album, and "The Pretender" was chosen for Best Hard Rock Performance. The album was also nominated for Album of the Year, while "The Pretender" was also nominated for Record of the Year and Best Rock Song. The album also won Best International Album at the 2008 Brit Awards. Q ranked it the 12th best album of 2007, while Rolling Stone put the album at the 45th spot in a similar list.

== Commercial performance ==
In the United States, Echoes, Silence, Patience & Grace entered the Billboard 200 album chart at number three, selling 168,000 copies in its first week, and has since been certified Gold by the RIAA. As of April 14, 2011, it has sold 897,000 copies in US. On October 6, 2017, Echoes, Silence, Patience & Grace was certified Platinum by the RIAA.

The album debuted at the top of the UK Albums Chart, selling 135,685 albums in its first week; Australia and New Zealand, being certified platinum in its first week in both countries; and Canada, where the album went Platinum.

== Track listing ==
All tracks are written by Dave Grohl, Taylor Hawkins, Nate Mendel, and Chris Shiflett except where noted.

Echoes, Silence, Patience & Grace
No.	Title	Writer(s)	Length
1.	"The Pretender"		4:29
2.	"Let It Die"		4:05
3.	"Erase/Replace"		4:13
4.	"Long Road to Ruin"		3:44
5.	"Come Alive"		5:10
6.	"Stranger Things Have Happened"	Grohl	5:21
7.	"Cheer Up, Boys (Your Make Up Is Running)"		3:41
8.	"Summer's End"		4:37
9.	"Ballad of the Beaconsfield Miners"	Grohl	2:32
10.	"Statues"		3:47
11.	"But, Honestly"		4:35
12.	"Home"		4:52
Total length:			51:12

European edition bonus track
No.	Title	Length
13.	"Once & For All" (Demo)	3:47
Total length:		54:59

Japanese edition bonus tracks
No.	Title	Writer(s)	Length
13.	"Once & For All" (Demo)		3:47
14.	"Seda"	Grohl	3:45
Total length:			58:44

== Personnel ==
Personnel adapted from Echoes, Silence, Patience & Grace liner notes. (Note: The band members' instruments are not credited in the album's liner notes, except for Hawkins' background vocals and Grohl and Hawkins' piano. Their primary instruments are listed based on their de facto primary roles in the group.)

Foo Fighters

- Dave Grohl – rhythm and lead guitar, vocals, piano on "Summer's End", "Statues" and "Home"
- Taylor Hawkins – drums, background vocals on "Erase/Replace", "Cheer Up, Boys (Your Make Up Is Running)" and "But, Honestly", piano on "Summer's End"
- Nate Mendel – bass guitar
- Chris Shiflett – lead and rhythm guitar

Additional musicians

- Drew Hester – percussion on "Come Alive", "Let It Die", "Cheer Up, Boys (Your Make Up Is Running)", "Long Road to Ruin" and "Summer's End"
- Rami Jaffee – keyboards on "Let It Die", "Erase/Replace", "Long Road to Ruin", "Come Alive" and "But, Honestly", accordion on "Statues"
- Brantley Kearns Jr. – fiddle on "Statues"
- Kaki King – acoustic guitar on "Ballad of the Beaconsfield Miners"
- Pat Smear – guitar on "Let It Die"
- Oliver Allgood – lute on "Long Road to Ruin"
- The Section Quartet – string section, arranged by Audrey Riley

Production

- Gil Norton – production
- Adrian Bushby – engineering
- John Lousteau – engineering assistance
- Jake Davies – Pro Tools engineering
- Rich Costey – mixing
- Claudius Mittendorfer – mixing assistance
- Brian Gardner – mastering

== Charts ==
=== Weekly charts ===
2007 weekly chart performance
Chart (2007)	Peak position
Australian Albums (ARIA)	1
Austrian Albums (Ö3 Austria)	4
Belgian Albums (Ultratop Flanders)	1
Belgian Albums (Ultratop Wallonia)	14
Canadian Albums (Billboard)	1
Czech Albums (IFPI)	26
Danish Albums (Hitlisten)	11
Dutch Albums (Album Top 100)	6
European Albums (Billboard)	2
Finnish Albums (Suomen virallinen lista)	7
French Albums (SNEP)	24
German Albums (Offizielle Top 100)	3
Hungarian Albums (MAHASZ)	33
Irish Albums (IRMA)	2
Italian Albums (FIMI)	15
Japanese Albums (Oricon)	6
Mexican Albums (Top 100 Mexico)	50
New Zealand Albums (RMNZ)	1
Polish Albums (ZPAV)	40
Portuguese Albums (AFP)	18
Scottish Albums (Official Charts)	1
Spanish Albums (Promusicae)	43
Swedish Albums (Sverigetopplistan)	9
Swiss Albums (Schweizer Hitparade)	2
UK Albums (Official Charts)	1
US Billboard 200	3
US Top Alternative Albums (Billboard)	1
US Top Hard Rock Albums (Billboard)	1
US Top Rock Albums (Billboard)	1
US Indie Store Album Sales (Billboard)	1

=== Year-end charts ===
2007 year-end chart performance
Chart (2007)	Position
Australian Albums (ARIA)	20
Austrian Albums (Ö3 Austria)	64
Belgian Albums (Ultratop Flanders)	38
Dutch Albums (Album Top 100)	78
European Albums (Billboard)	35
New Zealand Albums (RMNZ)	16
Swiss Albums (Schweizer Hitparade)	86
UK Albums (OCC)	15
US Billboard 200	143

2008 year-end chart performance
Chart (2008)	Position
Australian Albums (ARIA)	55
UK Albums (OCC)	94
US Billboard 200	92
US Top Rock Albums (Billboard)	24

== Certifications ==
Certifications for Echoes, Silence, Patience & Grace
Region	Certification	Certified units/sales
Australia (ARIA)	2× Platinum	140,000^{^}
Austria (IFPI Austria)	Gold	10,000^{*}
Belgium (BRMA)	Gold	15,000^{*}
Canada (Music Canada)	Platinum	100,000^{^}
Denmark (IFPI Danmark)	Platinum	20,000^{‡}
Germany (BVMI)	Platinum	200,000^{‡}
Ireland (IRMA)	Platinum	15,000^{^}
New Zealand (RMNZ)	2× Platinum	30,000^{^}
United Kingdom (BPI)	2× Platinum	754,000
United States (RIAA)	Platinum	1,000,000^{^}
^{*} Sales figures based on certification alone.^{^} Shipments figures based on certification alone.^{‡} Sales+streaming figures based on certification alone.
