= Adrian Bushby =

- Genres: Rock, Pop, Indie Pop, Metal
- Occupations: Record Producer, Engineer, Mixer
- Website: www.adrianbushby.com

Adrian Bushby is a recording engineer, mixer and producer. He works from his home studio in London, England, and has recorded and mixed for artists including; New Order, Placebo, U2, Spice Girls, Feeder, Jamie T and Maxïmo Park. In 2008, he won a Grammy Award for his work on American rock band Foo Fighters' sixth studio album, Echoes, Silence, Patience & Grace. He was awarded another in 2011 for The Resistance by English rock band Muse. Adrian was given a TEC Award in 2008 for Outstanding Creative Achievement in Record Production and went on to win the Music Producers Guild Award for Single of the Year in 2010.

Selected Discography
Year	Artist	Album	Credit
2025	AlphaWhores	You Can Come Out Now	Production
2019	Maximo Park	As Long as We Keep Moving	Production/Mixing
2018	Black Peaks	All That Divides	Production/Mixing
2018	The Magic Gang	The Magic Gang	Mixing
2018	Muse	Simulation Theory	Assistant Engineer (Track 10)
2017	Би-2	Горизонт Событий	Mixing
2017	The Darkness	Pinewood Smile	Production/Mixing
2016	Young Guns	Echoes	Production
2015	The Strypes	Little Victories	Mixing
2014	Jenn Ayache	L'Américain	Mixing
2014	Skip The Use	Can Be Late	Mixing
2013	Will Young	The Essential	Mixing
2012	Skunk Anansie	Black Traffic	Mixing
2012	Muse	The 2nd Law	Engineer, Additional Production
2012	The Enemy	Streets In The Sky	Mixing
2011	The Gift	Explode	Mixing
2011	The Subways	Money and Celebrity	Mixing
2010	Everything Everything	Man Alive	Mixing
2009	Muse	The Resistance	Engineer, Performance
2009	Foo Fighters	Greatest Hits	Production, Engineer
2008	The Saturdays	Chasing Lights	Mixing
2007	Maximo Park	Our Earthly Pleasures	Engineer, Audio Engineer, Mixing
2007	Foo Fighters	Echoes, Silence, Patience & Grace	Engineer, Audio Engineer
2007	Jamie T	Panic Prevention	Mixing
2006	Rachel Stevens	Come and Get It	Mixing
2006	McFly	Please, Please Pt. 1	Mixing
2005	Feeder	Pushing the Senses	Engineer, Mixing, Programing
2003	Jamiroquai	Complete Odyssey	Engineer
2003	Dashboard Confessional	A Mark, a Mission, a Brand, a Scar	Engineer, Mixing
2003	Feeder	Comfort in Sound	Engineer, Mixing
2002	Starsailor	Love is Here	Engineer, Mixing Engineer
2001	New Order	Get Ready	Engineer, Mixing
