= Animal Boy =

Studio album by Ramones
- Released: May 19, 1986
- Recorded: c. May 1985, December 1985 – January 1986
- Studios: Intergalactic Studios, New York City; Polar Studios, Stockholm
- Genre: Punk rock
- Length: 31:44
- Label: Sire
- Producer: Jean Beauvoir

Ramones chronology
Too Tough to Die (1984)	Animal Boy (1986)	Halfway to Sanity (1987)

Singles from Animal Boy
- 1. "Bonzo Goes to Bitburg" b/w "Daytime Dilemma (Dangers of Love)" Released: June 1985 (UK); 2. "Somebody Put Something in My Drink" b/w "Something to Believe In" Released: April 1986 (Double A-side, UK); 3. "Crummy Stuff" b/w "Something to Believe In" Released: July 1986 (UK); 4. "Something to Believe In" b/w "Animal Boy" Released: August 1986 (US)

Animal Boy is the ninth studio album by the American punk rock band Ramones, released through Sire Records on May 19, 1986. Due to conflicts within the group, the album features less of lead singer Joey Ramone, both in performing and writing, and less performing from guitarist Johnny Ramone. Bassist Dee Dee Ramone wrote and sang more on this album than on previous albums, and Richie Ramone became the first drummer to write songs for the band since Tommy Ramone, the band's original drummer. Richie also wrote for Too Tough To Die (1984). The album spawned four singles, all of which charted on the UK Singles Chart, as well as other charts. In addition to singles, the band promoted their album using a music video for "Something to Believe In", which parodied the contemporary benefit concerts Live Aid and Hands Across America.

Lyrical themes of the album range from band members' frustrations with one another, themselves, and loved ones, to more politically themed songs—a rarity in Ramones music. "My Brain Is Hanging Upside Down (Bonzo Goes to Bitburg)" saw the Ramones criticizing U.S. President Ronald Reagan for his controversial visit to a military cemetery in Bitburg, Germany, despite Johnny Ramone disagreeing with the song's message. Critically, Animal Boy was not as acclaimed as its predecessor, Too Tough to Die, with some critics quick to point out that the band had strayed far from their original style and were experimenting with several genres by this point. However, the album charted in four different countries, including the United States and United Kingdom.

== Background ==
By 1985, there was a considerable amount of conflict between band members. Lead singer Joey Ramone went so far as to withdraw from the writing process, after having been a vital part of it on previous records. Joey recalled: "I'd had it with the Ramones. 'Mental Hell' is about that. Part of it came from breaking up with [then girlfriend] Angela. The other part of it was that I had really had it with the band." In later interviews, however, Joey stated that it was not the conflict that made him stop writing, but rather that he'd had "ideas on the backburner." Bassist Dee Dee Ramone claimed guitarist Johnny Ramone was the reason for much of the stress, alleging that Johnny did not want to do songs Joey wrote for multiple reasons: "Joey will present a great tune and Johnny won't do it because it's this or it's that. 'I'm not going to play minor chords. I'm not going to play lead. I'm not going to come to England.' For God's sake! That's why Joey gotta do his solo album."

Consequently, the somewhat recently added drummer Richie Ramone stepped up to the writing process, resulting in the hit song "Somebody Put Something in My Drink", released as a single and later appearing on the band's first compilation album, Ramones Mania (1988). "Joey was always encouraging me to write songs," explained Richie, "but I didn't really need the encouragement." This would be the first time the band featured the drummer as a songwriter since original drummer Tommy Ramone, with Joey reasoning that he wanted to make Richie feel like a part of the band. Joey had felt past drummers had not been so much a part of the band, nor any good at writing, and called Richie a "regular Phil Collins". In his 2012 autobiography, Commando, Johnny Ramone awarded the album a "B−" grade, lamenting the album's production quality and commenting that the guitar parts did not even sound like him. "The producer on [Animal Boy], Jean Beauvoir," Johnny related, "was selected by the label, not us."

The band recorded most of the album with Beauvoir at Intergalactic Studios in New York City in December 1985. "My Brain Is Hanging Upside Down (Bonzo Goes to Bitburg)" had been recorded earlier in the year and released as a UK-only single in June 1985. In the winter of 1986, Beauvoir and Joey Ramone flew to Stockholm, Sweden to record the lead vocals at ABBA's Polar Studios, where the album was also mixed.

== Lyrics and composition ==
Animal Boy featured a range of genres and musical elements that were completely new to the band and had not been featured on previous albums. Frequent use of synthesizers, as well as minimalistic "gimmicky" lyrics, caused critics and fans to feel as though the Ramones had strayed far away from their early, raw punk sound, despite Animal Boy's predecessor Too Tough Too Die being acclaimed for the band returning to their roots. "The main problem with Animal Boy," explained author Everett True, "was that there was no longer one discernible Ramones sound: it sounds as disjointed as the band members probably felt. The guitar parts could've been played by anyone, and Richie's drumming was slipping away from Tommy's original template. The Ramones were turning into a 9-5 job, night not day."

The album begins with Joey singing "Somebody Put Something in My Drink", written by Richie, who stated that he came up with the lyrics while he was dating Frankie Valli's daughter and mistakenly drank after someone else in a nightclub. Rolling Stone editor David Fricke described Joey's vocal performance in the song as an "exaggerated wino growl while Johnny crushes the chord changes with his trash-compactor guitar". "Animal Boy" and "Apeman Hop" were compositionally similar to "Cretin Hop" from 1977's Rocket to Russia, but were described by True to be "a thousandth as good". "Love Kills" was inspired by the Alex Cox biopic Sid and Nancy (also known as Sid and Nancy: Love Kills). The lyrics relate that the couple will never be able to win with drugs, despite the fact that the song's writer himself, Dee Dee, would later succumb to a heroin overdose. Animal Boy's fifth track, "She Belongs to Me", is a ballad written by Dee Dee and Beauvoir regarding unrequited love, and features heavy use of synthesizers, while earlier albums would have used a soft acoustic guitar or occasionally strings for ballad-type songs. Side A of the album concludes with "Crummy Stuff", played in a pop punk style, with repetitive lyrics based on the band's past of being chaotic and never meeting expectations.

Side B begins with one of the Ramones' few explicitly political songs, "My Brain Is Hanging Upside Down (Bonzo Goes to Bitburg)", which deals with the Bitburg controversy. The lyrics encapsulated the feelings of Joey, Dee Dee and Beauvoir while watching US President Ronald Reagan visit a German military cemetery in Bitburg, West Germany on May 5, 1985. In an interview with East Coast Rocker, Joey explained: "What Reagan did was fucked up. Everybody told him not to go, all his people told him not to go, and he went anyway. How can you fuckin' forgive the Holocaust? How can you say, 'Oh well, it's OK now?' That's crazy!" Dee Dee also asserted that Johnny had made the band seem right-wing. "It was the first time we could make a statement to show we weren't prejudiced," he explained. "We'd just had these skinheads at our gigs, punks walking around wearing swastikas." Johnny disliked the song and resisted playing it live, saying that Reagan was his favorite president of his lifetime. It was Johnny who insisted that the song's title be changed to "My Brain Is Hanging Upside Down"; "Bonzo Goes to Bitburg", the original title, was relegated to parenthesis. "Bonzo", a pejorative nickname for Reagan, refers to a chimpanzee from Bedtime for Bonzo, a 1951 comedy film in which Reagan starred.

"Mental Hell", the next track and the second written by Joey, dealt with his recent stress with the band and his relationship with his girlfriend, Angela, ending. Author Dave Thompson described "Eat That Rat" as "reaching back to their pure punk past". While "Eat That Rat" is one minute and thirty-seven seconds long, the shortest track on the album is the next song, "Freak of Nature", which clocks in at one minute and thirty-two seconds. Johnny explained that it was written by him and Dee Dee while changing reels in an open-reel audio tape recording at the studio. "Hair of the Dog", a song about the guilt of alcoholism, is the third and final song written by Joey. The album's last track, "Something to Believe In", was influenced heavily by British pop, and was described by Susan Cummings of Spin as a "pseudo-AOR attempted teen anthem" and by author Scott Schnider as a "surging, yearning anthem".

== Marketing and promotion ==
For the album's front cover, the band wanted to take a photo with a monkey from the Bronx Zoo. George DuBose originally took the picture in the zoo's monkey house, but this photo was rejected by the zoo director. The zoo would not allow the band to borrow a chimp for photographing, so DuBose decided to try hiring Zippy the Chimp, a baby chimpanzee who had appeared on Late Night With David Letterman and was successful. The resulting idea was to take the picture of the band standing in front of a gorilla cage with Punk Magazine founder Legs McNeil in a gorilla costume. Richie is holding Zippy, and DuBose had to refrain from flashing light so as not to frighten it. However, according to DuBose, the chimp was already out of control. "Zippy was getting wild," Dubose recalled. "He wasn't looking at the camera and was fucking around with the guys. I wasn't getting the picture because the chimp was out of control, so finally the trainer goes up to Zippy and whacks him across the face." The lack of flash resulted in a lowlighted, warmer colored photograph, which would be used as the album's cover.

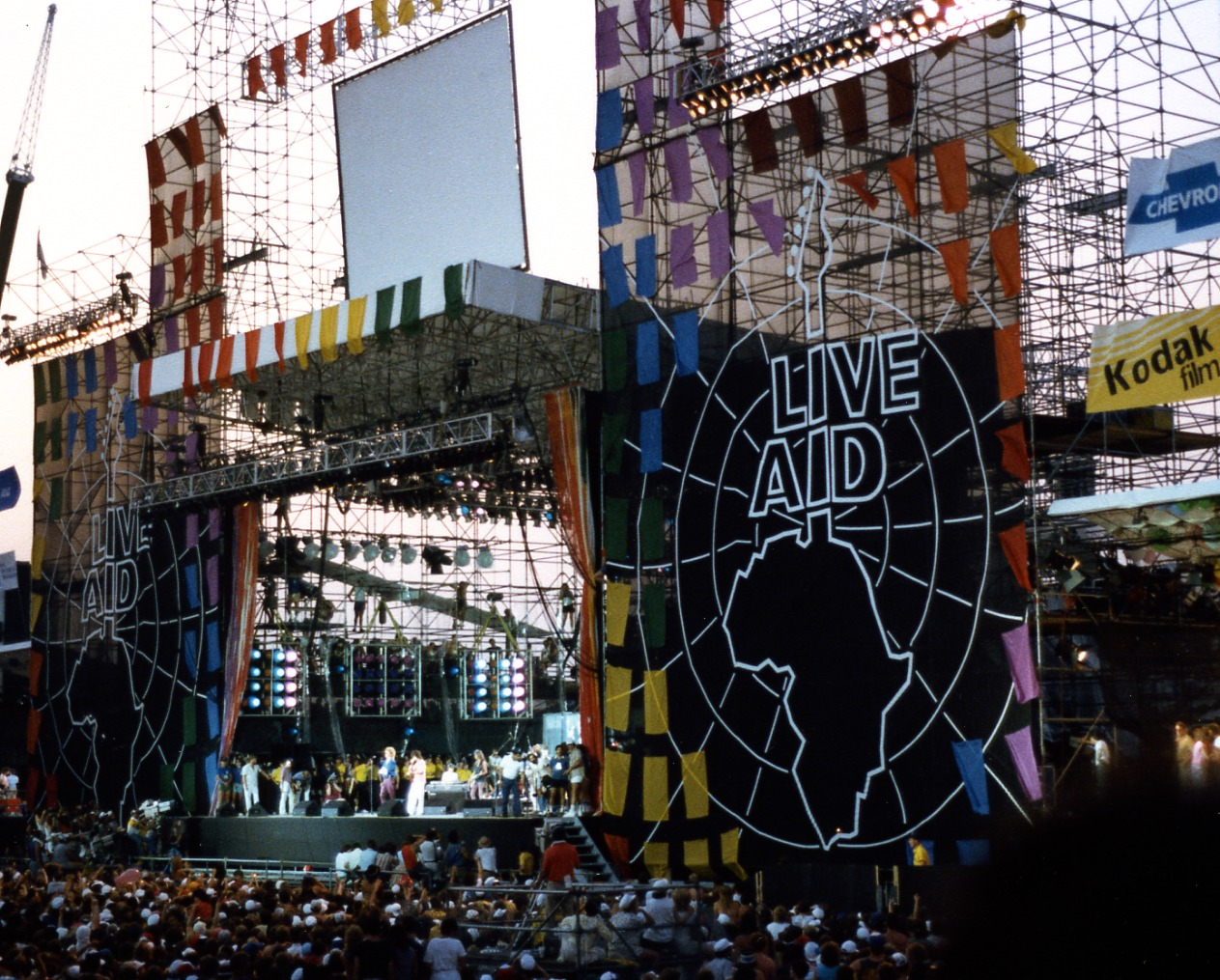
The music video for "Something to Believe In" satirized the 1985 Live Aid benefit concert. Rather than saying "Live Aid" with an image of Africa, the stage in the video says "Ramones Aid" with the band's logo.

Animal Boy was released on May 19, 1986. While touring for its promotion, the band only used four to five songs from the album while the rest of the setlist was derived from songs off earlier releases. Johnny described this type of concert setlist to promote releases to be common for "a lot of later [Ramones] albums," saying it was "because the material just didn't measure up to our other stuff."

In addition to touring, Sire Records and Beggars Banquet Records in the UK released four singles to help promote the album in hopes of receiving more radio airplay. The first single from Animal Boy was "My Brain Is Hanging Upside Down (Bonzo Goes to Bitburg)", issued by Beggars Banquet in June 1985. "Go Home Anne" was the B-side, produced by Ed Stasium and mixed by Lemmy Kilmister, lead singer of Motörhead. There were multiple explanations given for why the single was not released in the United States: the product manager at Sire Records explained that it was both a "financial and political" decision, while the parent company, Warner Bros. Records, claimed that "It just wasn't considered a good enough record." The single's jacket cover depicted President Reagan giving a speech at Bergen-Belsen concentration camp before going to Bitburg, but the image was removed from later pressings. British newspaper Melody Maker claimed it was removed because the band received pressure from "Moral Majority, the Patriotic League of the Alamo, and the SS."

The music video for "Something to Believe In" was a parody of both the Live Aid benefit concert and Hands Across America. The video was described by author Everett True to be "reassuringly foolish" and "a welcome return to [the Ramones'] old sense of humor." Several guests are featured in the video, including X, The B-52's, Weird Al Yankovic, Spinal Tap, Ted Nugent, the Circle Jerks, Toni Basil, Rodney Bingenheimer, Holly Beth Vincent, Penn and Teller, Sparks, Michael McKean, Harry Shearer, and Afrika Bambaataa. Because the music video was praised by Warner Bros., they released "Something to Believe In" as a double A-side with "Somebody Put Something in My Drink". "Something to Believe In" was also released with "Animal Boy" in the United States and "Crummy Stuff" in the UK through Beggars Banquet.

== Reception ==
Professional ratings
Review scores
Source	Rating
AllMusic	3/5 stars
Robert Christgau	B+
Spin Alternative Record Guide	2/10

=== Critical ===
The album received mixed reviews from critics. Village Voice music critic Robert Christgau gave the album a "B+" and considered both "She Belongs to Me" and "Crummy Stuff" to be "defensive-sounding", but called "Something to Believe In" an anthem and praised "My Brain Is Hanging Upside Down (Bonzo Goes to Bitburg)". Rolling Stone critic David Fricke deemed the album a "reductionist masterpiece" that "proves they still have a lot more to give", claiming that it rivaled previous albums Leave Home and Rocket to Russia.

The Ramones' decade of discontent on rock's commercial and social fringe has hardened their little rascal hearts; "Mental Hell" is a "My Degeneration" crawling-the-walls blues, and Dee Dee spits out the words of the ninety-seven-second harangue "Eat That Rat" with venomous zeal. "Love Kills," originally intended for the soundtrack of Alex Cox's forthcoming Sid Vicious-Nancy Spungen docudrama, sounds like standard-issue bamalama until you decipher the agitated mix of bitter loss and righteous anger in Dee Dee's rabid yapping.

— David Fricke, Rolling Stone

In a retrospective review, Eduardo Rivadavia, editor for AllMusic, criticized the album for using more modern commercial conventions and for its heavy use of synthesizers and keyboards in an attempt to reinvent the band's style. Rivadavia specifically pointed to "Somebody Put Something in My Drink", which he claimed "wastes an aggressive vocal performance from Joey Ramone by supporting it with a shamelessly polished synthesizer backing track", and referred to "Something to Believe In" as "unbearably soft". He concluded that the album had been a "career low" for the Ramones, but still rated it three out of five stars.

=== Commercial ===
In the United States, the album entered the Billboard 200 on June 21, 1986, at No. 146, and rose to No. 143 the following week. Despite staying on the chart for six weeks, the album's peak position did not rise above No. 143. It entered the UK Album Charts on May 31, 1986, where it stayed for two weeks and reached a peak position of No. 38. The album entered the Canadian charts on June 7, 1986, at No. 96, moving up to No. 94 a week later. The album returned to position No. 96 on June 21, leaving the chart on July 12. On June 11, it entered the Swedish Sverigetopplistan charts, where it remained on the chart for one week at No. 37.

== Track listing ==
Track listing adapted from the Animal Boy liner notes.

Side one
No.	Title	Writer(s)	Length
1.	"Somebody Put Something in My Drink"	Richie Ramone	3:23
2.	"Animal Boy"	Dee Dee Ramone, Johnny Ramone	1:50
3.	"Love Kills"	D. Ramone	2:19
4.	"Apeman Hop"	D. Ramone	2:02
5.	"She Belongs to Me"	D. Ramone, Jean Beauvoir	3:54
6.	"Crummy Stuff"	D. Ramone	2:06

Side two
No.	Title	Writer(s)	Length
7.	"My Brain Is Hanging Upside Down (Bonzo Goes to Bitburg)"	Joey Ramone, D. Ramone, Beauvoir	3:55
8.	"Mental Hell"	Joey Ramone	2:38
9.	"Eat That Rat"	D. Ramone, Johnny Ramone	1:37
10.	"Freak of Nature"	D. Ramone, Johnny Ramone	1:32
11.	"Hair of the Dog"	Joey Ramone	2:19
12.	"Something to Believe In"	D. Ramone, Beauvoir	4:09

== Personnel ==
Ramones

- Joey Ramone – lead vocals (tracks 1–2, 4–8, 10–12)
- Johnny Ramone – guitar
- Dee Dee Ramone – bass guitar, backing vocals, lead vocals (tracks 3, 9)
- Richie Ramone – drums, backing vocals

Additional musicians

- Walter Lure – additional guitar
- Jean Beauvoir – additional guitar, keyboards

Technical

- Jean Beauvoir – producer, mixing
- Jorge Esteban – engineer (Intergalactic)
- Grant Gillett – assistant engineer (Intergalactic)
- Anders Oredson – engineer (Polar), mixing
- Bobby Cohen – engineer (track 7)
- Ian Cooper – mastering
- George DuBose – cover design, front photography
- Paul O. Colliton – back photography

== Charts ==
Chart (1986)	Peak position
Canada Top Albums/CDs (RPM)	94
Finnish Albums (The Official Finnish Charts)	31
Swedish Albums (Sverigetopplistan)	37
UK Albums (Official Charts)	38
US Billboard 200	143
