= Bonzo Goes to Bitburg =

Single by the Ramones

from the album Animal Boy
- B-side: "Go Home Ann" (12-inch only); "Daytime Dilemma (Dangers of Love)"
- Released: June 1985
- Studio: Intergalactic Studios, New York City
- Genre: Punk rock; hard rock
- Length: 3:57
- Label: Beggars Banquet (UK); Sire (US)
- Songwriters: Joey Ramone; Dee Dee Ramone; Jean Beauvoir
- Producer: Jean Beauvoir

The Ramones singles chronology
"The KKK Took My Baby Away" (1985)	"Bonzo Goes to Bitburg" (1985)	"Something to Believe In" (1985)

"Bonzo Goes to Bitburg" is a protest song by American punk rock band the Ramones. It was issued as a single in the UK by Beggars Banquet Records in mid-1985. The song is an emotionally charged commentary on the Bitburg controversy from earlier that year, in which U.S. president Ronald Reagan had paid a state visit to a German World War II cemetery and gave a speech where numerous Waffen-SS soldiers were buried. Lyrically, the song was a departure from the usual Ramones topics. While not commercially successful, it was critically well received.

The 1985 single did not receive an American release. As an import, however, the record became a hit on U.S. college radio. It was eventually retitled "My Brain Is Hanging Upside Down (Bonzo Goes to Bitburg)", and appeared on the band's album Animal Boy, released in 1986. This second version of the title is the one used on subsequent live and compilation albums.

== Background and inspiration ==
The song was written in reaction to the visit paid by U.S. president Ronald Reagan to a military cemetery in Bitburg, West Germany, on May 5, 1985. Reagan laid a wreath at the cemetery and then gave a public address at a nearby air base. The visit was part of a trip paying tribute to the victims of Nazism and celebrating West Germany's revival as a powerful, democratic ally of the U.S.

Reagan's plan to visit the Bitburg cemetery had been criticized in the United States, Europe, and Israel because among the approximately 2,000 German soldiers buried there were 49 members of the Waffen-SS, the combat arm of the SS, which committed many atrocities. Among those vehemently opposed to the trip were Jewish and veterans' groups and both houses of the U.S. Congress. The phrase "Bonzo Goes to Bitburg" was coined by protesters in the weeks leading up to Reagan's trip. Employed as an epithet for Reagan, Bonzo is actually the name of the chimpanzee title character in Bedtime for Bonzo, a 1951 comedy starring Reagan. The phrase also echoes the title of the film's sequel, Bonzo Goes to College (1952), though Reagan did not appear in that picture.

Before departing for Germany, Reagan ignited more controversy when he expressed his belief that the soldiers buried at Bitburg "were victims, just as surely as the victims in the concentration camps". In his remarks immediately after the cemetery visit, Reagan said that "the crimes of the SS must rank among the most heinous in human history", but noted that many of those interred at Bitburg were "simply soldiers in the German army... There were thousands of such soldiers for whom Nazism meant no more than a brutal end to a short life."

Discussing the inspiration for the song, Ramones lead singer Joey Ramone, a Jewish man, explained that the president "sort of shit on everybody". Interviewed in 1986, he said,

We had watched Reagan going to visit the SS cemetery on TV and were disgusted. We're all good Americans, but Reagan's thing was like forgive and forget. How can you forget six million people being gassed and roasted?

Joey Ramone shared writing credit with Ramones bassist Dee Dee Ramone and Ramones producer and former Plasmatics bassist/keyboardist Jean Beauvoir. Commentators on the song tended to suggest that Joey was its primary author. Mickey Leigh, Joey's brother, who was particularly close with Dee Dee, claimed that while "everyone believed Joey had been the impetus to write the song ... it was actually Dee Dee." Beauvoir's camp states that he was equally involved in the lyrics in addition to his music and melody contributions.

== Tone and style ==
"Bonzo Goes to Bitburg"
Bridge of the song

The song's lyrics, with their explicitly serious content, were a departure from the Ramones' usual style. Spin's Jon Young called it "part exorcism and part slapstick comedy". David Corn described the beginning of the refrain—"Bonzo goes to Bitburg/then goes out for a cup of tea/As I watched it on TV/somehow it really bothered me"—as "snarled" by Joey over a "power-pop beat and melodic hooks galore". Salon arts editor Bill Wyman wrote of Johnny Ramone "lob[bing] guitar bombs" amid the song's "Spectorian, rushing production" and of "Joey's pained, pleading voice". Douglas Wolk fit the song into his general view of Joey Ramone as different from his many musical imitators in that "he never, ever sneered", adding that the song's tone "isn't contemptuous, just confused and angry". Scott Miller concurred, noting that the song "doesn't attempt an airtight indictment of Reagan", but perhaps more importantly excels at just "putting across the honest feeling of being impotently rankled".

== Release ==
"Bonzo Goes to Bitburg" was issued in Great Britain as a 45 rpm 12" by Beggars Banquet Records. The single's first B-side, "Go Home Ann", by Dee Dee and Mickey Leigh, was produced by Ed Stasium and mixed by Motörhead lead singer Lemmy. The second B-side, "Daytime Dilemma (Dangers of Love)", had previously appeared on the Ramones' 1984 album, Too Tough to Die. Sources at the Ramones' U.S. label, Sire Records, and its parent company, Warner Bros. Records, gave differing reasons for not releasing the single in America: The Sire products manager said the decision was "both financial and political"; an anonymous Warner Bros. source claimed, "It just wasn't considered a good enough record." The original jacket of the single included a photograph of Reagan speaking at the site of the Bergen-Belsen concentration camp just hours before his trip to Bitburg; this image was removed in subsequent pressings. Melody Maker blamed its elimination on pressure from the "Moral Majority, the Patriotic League of the Alamo, and the SS."

The Ramones' Animal Boy LP, released by both Sire and Beggars Banquet in 1986, included "Bonzo Goes to Bitburg". The title was altered to "My Brain Is Hanging Upside Down (Bonzo Goes to Bitburg)" to placate Johnny, a staunch conservative and fervent Reagan supporter. "Go Home Ann" was never included on another Ramones release until the 2022 box set, The Sire Albums: 1981-1989, in which it was included on the LP of B-sides and demos.

== Reception ==
The "Bonzo Goes to Bitburg" single did not chart highly in the UK, peaking at the low position of #81. Though available only as an import in 1985, it was put into rotation by many American college radio stations, and record stores that handled imports reported robust sales. It inspired Steven Van Zandt to request Joey's participation in his Artists United Against Apartheid single "Sun City", released that October, in which Joey sang a line again protesting Reagan's policies. The single was also a major critical success. Reviewing it for Spin, John Leland wrote,

Just listen to Johnny's freight cars of guitar chords, Dee Dee's "ahh, naa naa naa" surf harmonies, and Joey's down-to-earth irritation at watching our commander in chief on TV. The Ramones are so brilliant because they perceive the world the way regular people do—through television. "Go Home Ann" is ... powerful but lacks that patented Ramones bubblegum melody. "Daytime Dilemma," on the other hand, is the 1910 Fruitgum Company with giant blocks of Gibson guitar.

In the annual Pazz & Jop Critics Poll conducted by The Village Voice, "Bonzo Goes to Bitburg" was ranked the fifth best single of 1985, where the editor wrote that it was "a pleasure to see the Ramones place so high after the intrepid Seymour Stein refused to release their most overt political act." In his review of Animal Boy, Rolling Stone's David Fricke called the song "brilliant". He wrote that it "vividly captures the sense of helplessness and confusion felt by rock youth in the Age of Reagan". In his book Music: What Happened?, Scott Miller includes it among his list of best songs from 1986, while Salon's Wyman retrospectively describes it as "the group's greatest song and [Joey's] greatest vocal performance".

== Other versions ==
A concert recording of "Bonzo Goes to Bitburg" appears on the band's 1991 album Loco Live. The studio version was used in the soundtrack of the film School of Rock (2003), although the official version was the version used in the film itself. Several bands have recorded cover versions: The Agnews on the anthology album Gabba Gabba Hey: A Tribute to the Ramones (1991); The Huntingtons on their album File Under Ramones (1999); Blanks 77 on the Ramones Maniacs tribute album (2001); Wednesday Night Heroes on their Move to Press EP (2005); Trashlight Vision on their album Alibis and Ammunition (2006); MxPx on their album On the Cover II (2009); and Iron Chic on their Spooky Action EP (2013). In 2004, The Mighty Mighty Bosstones' Dicky Barrett and Lawrence Katz were joined by ex-Ramones Marky and C.J. for a live performance of the song available on the DVD Too Tough to Die: A Tribute to Johnny Ramone.
