= Hate Crew Deathroll =

Studio album by Children of Bodom
- Released: 6 January 2003
- Recorded: August–September 2002
- Studio: Astia-Studios
- Genres: Melodic death metal; power metal
- Length: 36:36
- Labels: Spinefarm, Century Media
- Producer: Anssi Kippo

Children of Bodom chronology
Follow the Reaper (2000)	Hate Crew Deathroll (2003)	Bestbreeder from 1997 to 2000 (2003)

Hate Crew Deathroll is the fourth studio album by Finnish melodic death metal band Children of Bodom, released in 2003 under the Century Media label. It is the final Children of Bodom album to be recorded with all five original members, as their original rhythm guitarist, Alexander Kuoppala, would leave the band in 2003. It was successful both in Europe and the USA, which is demonstrated by the appearance of the "Needled 24/7" music video on MTV2's Headbangers Ball. "Needled 24/7" also featured on the heavy metal documentary Metal: A Headbanger's Journey and the 2012 horror comedy video game Lollipop Chainsaw.

The track "Angels Don't Kill" was included on the soundtrack of the 2009 video game Brütal Legend and the track "Hate Crew Deathroll" was included in the 2007 skateboarding video game Skate.

== Name ==
Since the release of the album, the term Hate Crew has been used to refer to both the devoted fanbase of the band and the band members themselves. Alexi Laiho had the letters "COBHC", an acronym for Children of Bodom Hate Crew, tattooed on his left hand fingers.

== Tracks ==
With this album, the band's sound became more condensed and less classical influenced, oriented more towards a heavier and harsher sound than previous albums. The keyboards were toned down as the guitars took hold as the more predominant instrument.

The tracks "Sixpounder" and "Angels Don't Kill" are played in drop C (CGCFAD) tuning, which has the 6th (C) string tuned a step lower than the band's usual step-down tuning.

The band shot a video for "Needled 24/7", but it ended up being very expensive and did not turn out the way they wanted. To make up for it, they shot the video for "Sixpounder". This video has an edited version, in which the blood looks less realistic, and the license plate at the beginning just says "COB 666". At the end of "Needled 24/7", there is a quote: "Death? What do y'all know about death?" taken from the movie Platoon. The lyrics of "Sixpounder" are about sixpounder cannons.

"You're Better Off Dead" was the only single from the CD. The single also contained a cover of the Ramones' "Somebody Put Something in My Drink". It topped the Finnish singles chart and stayed in the top 20 for sixteen weeks.

"Bodom Beach Terror" includes a quote heard in the movie American Psycho: "My pain is constant and sharp and I do not hope for a better world for anyone, in fact I want my pain to be inflicted on others." The quote can be heard at the end of the song. It continues at the beginning of the next track, "Angels Don't Kill", with "I want no one to escape."

For the song "Needled 24/7" Alexi Laiho was dubbed in the top 50 for fastest guitarist of all time.

The booklet contains the lyrics for "Needled 24/7", "Chokehold (Cocked 'n' Loaded)", "You're Better Off Dead" and "Hate Crew Deathroll".

The song "Hate Crew Deathroll" is only 3:36, but earlier pressings had a hidden track lasting 3 minutes and 2 seconds where, if heard at a high volume, the band are having a lively conversation in their native tongue of Finnish.

== Production ==
After experimenting with a new producer, Peter Tägtgren on Follow the Reaper, the band turned back to their old producer, Anssi Kippo, with Hate Crew Deathroll. The album was mixed by Mikko Karmila, who had also mixed Hatebreeder and the second mix of Follow the Reaper and would later produce their next album, Are You Dead Yet?.

At this time, Children of Bodom were dealing with the issue that their contract with Spinefarm, which published their three earlier major albums, expired with Hate Crew Deathroll's predecessor, Follow the Reaper. Furthermore, Spinefarm had been bought by the big company Universal Music Group in 2002, forcing the band to decide whether they would continue with Spinefarm, which would mean that their future albums would be released worldwide by UMG. They received several offers from various companies before their final decision to stay with Spinefarm (and thus UMG).

The contract with the "new" Spinefarm meant that Children of Bodom now had financial backing from one of the world's largest record companies, UMG. This led to the band for the recording of Hate Crew Deathroll having access to production equipment of the highest quality, and as a result, the album also received praise for its production, having been described as "crystal clear" and "sharp".

== Reception ==
Professional ratings
Review scores
Source	Rating
AllMusic	4.5/5 stars
Terrorizer	8/10 stars

Hate Crew Deathroll debuted at number one on the Finnish album charts, where it remained for 2 weeks. In France, the album reached position 74 and stayed on the charts for 2 weeks. In Sweden, it reached position 36th after 2 weeks.

In Germany, the album debuted at position 45, but quickly fell to 68 and then to 92nd place before finally falling out of the list. After the release of Hate Crew Deathroll, the band experienced a growing interest from several leading mainstream media, such as MTV, where the video for the song "Needled 24/7" aired on Headbangers Ball.

AllMusic has designated Hate Crew Deathroll as Children of Bodom's best-ever album, describing it as an album that is "particularly worth listening to".

As of November 2008, the album has sold 23,566 copies in Finland, and was certified gold the same year as it was released.

== Track listing ==
All tracks are written by Alexi Laiho, except where noted.

No.	Title	Lyrics	Music	Length
1.	"Needled 24/7"			4:08
2.	"Sixpounder"			3:24
3.	"Chokehold (Cocked 'n' Loaded)"	Laiho; Alexander Kuoppala; Henkka Seppälä	Laiho; Kuoppala	4:12
4.	"Bodom Beach Terror"			4:35
5.	"Angels Don't Kill"			5:13
6.	"Triple Corpse Hammerblow"			4:06
7.	"You're Better Off Dead"			4:01
8.	"Lil' Bloodred Ridin' Hood"		Laiho; Kuoppala	3:21
9.	"Hate Crew Deathroll"			3:36
Total length:				36:36

Japanese Limited Edition
No.	Title	Lyrics	Music	Length
10.	"Silent Scream" (Slayer cover)	Tom Araya	Jeff Hanneman; Kerry King	3:19
11.	"Somebody Put Something in My Drink" (Ramones cover)	Richie Ramone	Ramone	3:18
Total length:				43:13

2008 Spinefarm reissue
No.	Title	Length
12.	"Needled 24/7" (Live in London 2008)	4:18
Total length:		40:54

== Personnel ==
Children of Bodom

- Alexi Laiho – lead guitar, vocals
- Alexander Kuoppala – rhythm guitar
- Henkka Seppälä – bass
- Janne Wirman – keyboards
- Jaska Raatikainen – drums

Production

- Produced and recorded by Anssi Kippo
- Mixed by Mikko Karmila
- Mastered by Mika "Count" Jussila
- Graphic design by Sami Saramäki
- Band photographs by Toni Härkönen

== Charts ==
Chart (2003)	Peak position
Finnish Albums (Suomen virallinen lista)	1
French Albums (SNEP)	74
German Albums (Offizielle Top 100)	45
Hungarian Albums (MAHASZ)	30
Swedish Albums (Sverigetopplistan)	36
