= Jacqueline Rabun =

American jewelry designer (born 1961)

- Born: 1961 (age 64–65); Bitburg, West Germany
- Occupation: Jewelry designer

Jacqueline Rabun (born 1961) is an American jewelry designer.

== Early life and education ==
Rabun was born in Bitburg, West Germany. Bevor her family settled in Northern California and made a lot of travel experiences. She is self-taught.

== Career ==
Having studied fashion design in Los Angeles, she began designing jewelry in Los Angeles in 1988.

In 1989, she moved to London and launched her first collection of jewelry in 1990, having opened her studio. The collection was picked up by Barneys New York. Her work was featured on the cover of British Vogue in 1992, worn by Linda Evangelista. Rabun's style has been noted for being minimalist and gender neutral.

In 1999, she began a long-term collaboration with the Scandinavian luxury brand George Jensen.

She has created designs for Georg Jensen as well as other brands like Halston.

In 2002 she launched her first collection, Offspring, and one year later her Cave collection.

Today, Rabun is based in London, where she works as jewelry designer and silver craftsman.
