= You're Better Off Dead! =

Single by Children of Bodom

from the album Hate Crew Deathroll
- B-side: "Somebody Put Something in My Drink"
- Released: September 2002
- Genre: Melodic death metal, power metal
- Label: Spinefarm
- Songwriter(s): Alexi Laiho

"You're Better Off Dead!" is the first single from the album Hate Crew Deathroll by Children of Bodom. Released in 2002, the single track is the same recording but with a different mix from the album version. The B-side is a cover of "Somebody Put Something in My Drink" by Ramones with slightly altered lyrics. This cover appeared as the North America bonus track for Are You Dead Yet?, and also appeared as a Japanese bonus track for Hate Crew Deathroll.

The single spent two weeks as the best-seller in Finland and was awarded a gold disc.
