= Bitburg-Erdorf station =

Railway station in Bitburg, Germany

Bitburg-Erdorf
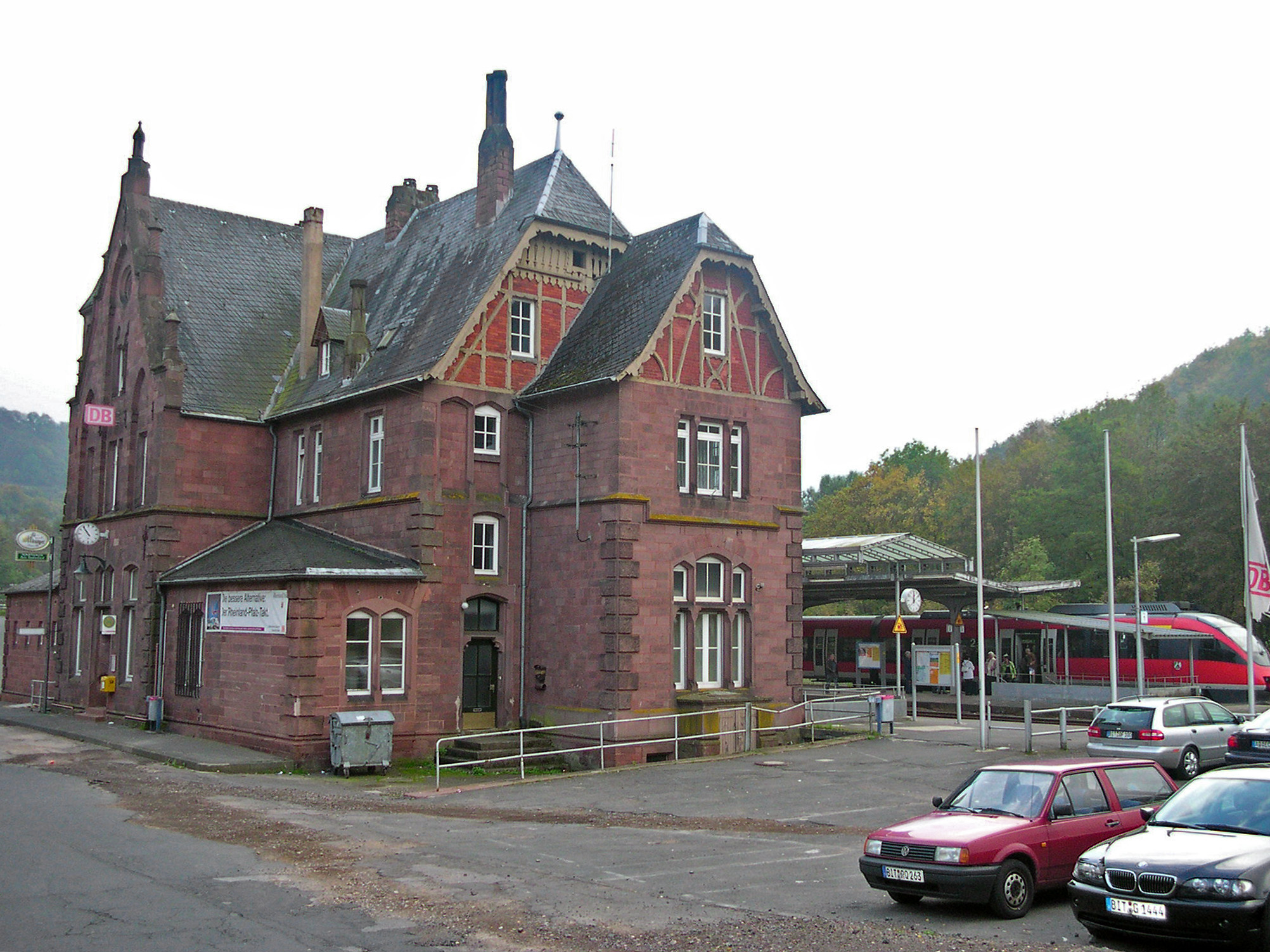
- Bitburg-Erdorf station

General information
- Location: Mainzer Str. 12, Bitburg, Rhineland-Palatinate; Germany
- Coordinates: 49°59′55″N 6°34′15″E
- System: Through station
- Lines: Hürth-Kalscheuren–Ehrang (KBS 474; km 131.4); Bitburg-Erdorf–Irrel–Igel (closed from Town station; km 0.0)
- Platforms: 3

Construction
- Architect: Carl Julius Raschdorff
- Architectural style: Gothic Revival

Other information
- Station code: 678
- DS100 code: SED
- IBNR: 8001828
- Category: 6
- Fare zone: VRT: 474
- Website: www.bahnhof.de

History
- Opened: 15 November 1871
Location

Bitburg-Erdorf station is a station on the Eifel Railway in Bitburg in the German state of Rhineland-Palatinate. The Nims–Sauer Valley railway (Nims-Sauertalbahn) branched off here to the now closed Bitburg Town station, the remaining part of which is only used for freight traffic and occasional excursion trains. Today Bitburg-Erdorf station is the only station in Bitburg that is served by regular passenger services.

== History ==
Due to the difficult topography and the low population density of the Eifel, railways reached it quite late. In November 1867, the Rhenish Railway Company (Rheinische Eisenbahn-Gesellschaft) began building a railway line from Cologne to Trier. After the outbreak of the Franco-Prussian War, the construction was accelerated, so the route was usable from 15 November 1871.

Already on 25 March 1871, the station was opened under the name of Erdorf-Bitburg. The construction of the station on the territory of the then still independent municipality of Erdorf met with opposition from among its inhabitants, who feared that the sparks of the locomotives could set the straw roofs of the houses on fire and because the track layout of station required the relocation of the municipal cemetery.

On 21 October 1910, a branch line was opened from Erdorf to Bitburg, which opened as the first part of the Nims-Sauer Valley railway and it was extended from about 1915 through Irrel to the Sauer valley and from there to Trier. The construction of the line followed 42 years of discussion about the exact route. To avoid confusion with the town station in Bitburg, the Erdorf-Bitburg station was renamed Erdorf.

In the years before the First World War, all express trains on the Cologne–Trier route stopped at Erdorf.

Due to the war, train traffic between Trier and Cologne was interrupted from the winter of 1944 onwards and only restarted in stages in 1946, so there were no direct connections between Erdorf and these destinations. Shortly after the end of the Second World War, the originally two-track Eifel Railway was rebuilt with one track.

== Station building and environment ==
=== Station building ===
The architect Julius Carl Raschdorff also designed the stations of Kyllburg, Ehrang and Speicher. Raschdorff, who held a professorship at the Imperial Technical University of Charlottenburg, is mainly known for the construction of the Berlin Cathedral.

The building is particularly distinguished by its red sandstone squares and lies between the railway tracks and Mainzer Straße. Build in red sandstone in the Gothic Revival style, similar to other entrance buildings on the Eifel Railway, it makes reference to the landscape and the regional history. The ticket hall, which ends with shield gables, juts out at right angles on both longitudinal sides. The gables are additionally emphasised by pointed arches. The part of the building that adjoins to the south of the ticket hall is accentuated by a projecting bay-like dwarf gable structure. The gabled structures of the north side as well as their embellishments are designed as a work of art. These splendid "palaces" (Schlösser) were financed from the money that France had to pay as reparations to Germany after the Franco-Prussian War.

Three extensions have been added since the completion of the original station. These were, however, inserted in such a way that they are hardly visible to the viewer. The station building has heritage protection.

=== Locomotive shed and water supply ===
From the opening of the Nims-Sauer Valley Railway there was a locomotive shed, and a small turntable at Erdorf station, which existed until the 1960s. At first, there were also water cranes in the station for filling the steam locomotives on all platforms.

=== Signal boxes ===
Erdorf station was equipped with two mechanical signal boxes. The signal box for the Nims-Sauer Valley Railway branch is under monument protection. It has a base of quarried limestone with two storeys. Above it there is another storey, which is disguised from the line with timber work. Two small bay windows protrude from the rectangular floor plan.

== Train services ==
Erdorf station was served in the 2017 timetable by the following services:

2017 timetable
Line	Route	Frequency
RE 12	Eifel-Mosel-Express:: Köln Messe/Deutz – Cologne Hbf – Köln Süd – Euskirchen – Mechernich – Kall – Jünkerath – Gerolstein – Bitburg-Erdorf – Trier Hbf	Four train pairs
RB 22	Eifel-Express: Gerolstein – Birresborn – Densborn – Kyllburg – Bitburg-Erdorf – Speicher – Kordel – Ehrang – Pfalzel – Trier Hbf	60 min
