= Bestbreeder from 1997 to 2000 =

Compilation album by Children of Bodom
- Released: August 2003
- Recorded: 1997–2000 (2003 for "Rebel Yell")
- Genre: Melodic death metal, power metal
- Length: 75:00

Children of Bodom chronology
Hate Crew Deathroll (2003)	Bestbreeder from 1997 to 2000 (2003)	Are You Dead Yet? (2005)

Bestbreeder from 1997 to 2000 is the first compilation album by Finnish melodic death metal band Children of Bodom. The live tracks off the album are available on Tokyo Warhearts.

This album was only released in Japan.

== Track listing ==
No.	Title	Length
1.	"Rebel Yell" (Billy Idol cover)	4:12
2.	"In the Shadows"	6:00
3.	"Lake Bodom"	4:08
4.	"Warheart"	4:07
5.	"Silent Night, Bodom Night"	3:13
6.	"Towards Dead End"	4:54
7.	"Children of Bodom"	5:14
8.	"Deadnight Warrior" (live)	3:32
9.	"Hatebreeder" (live)	4:30
10.	"Touch Like Angel of Death" (live)	5:53
11.	"Downfall" (live)	4:47
12.	"Follow the Reaper"	3:37
13.	"Bodom After Midnight"	3:44
14.	"Everytime I Die"	4:03
15.	"Mask of Sanity"	4:00
16.	"Hate Me!"	4:45
17.	"Kissing the Shadows"	4:34
