= Ehrang station =

Railway station in Trier, Germany

Ehrang
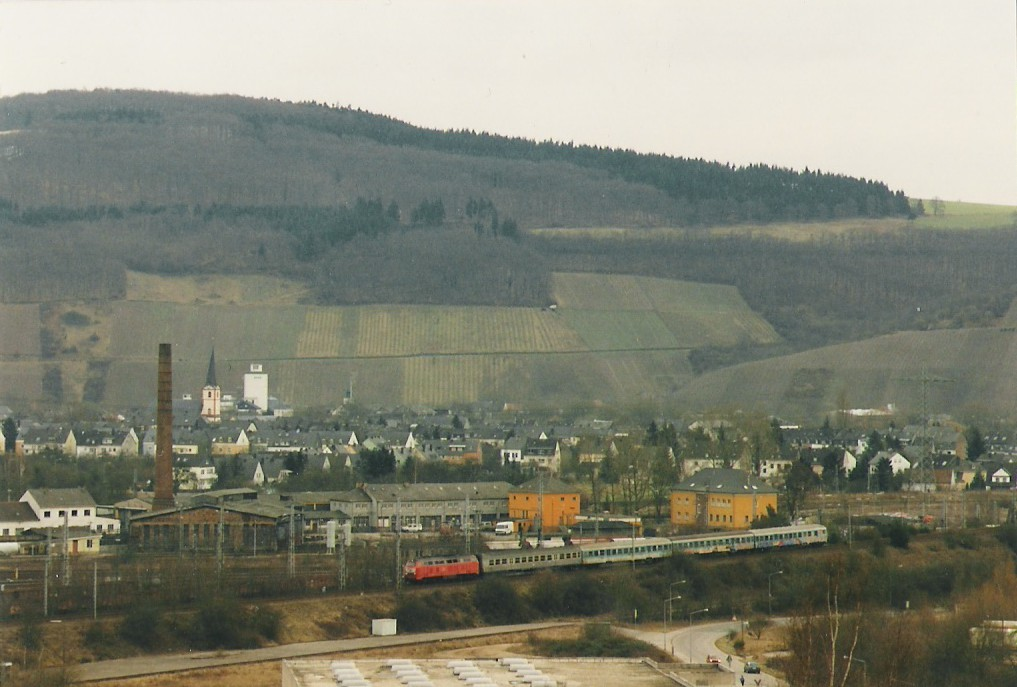
- Former marshalling yard

General information
- Location: Ehrangerstr. 3-5, Ehrang, Trier, Rhineland-Palatinate; Germany
- Coordinates: 49°48′07″N 6°41′08″E
- Lines: Hürth-Kalscheuren–Ehrang (KBS 474; km 131.4); Bitburg-Erdorf–Irrel–Igel (closed from Town station; km 0.0)

Construction
- Architect: Carl Julius Raschdorff
- Architectural style: Revivalism/Jugendstil

Other information
- Station code: 1488
- DS100 code: SEG
- IBNR: 8000370
- Category: 5
- Fare zone: VRT: 2

History
- Opened: 25 March 1871
- Closed: 3 March 2025
Location

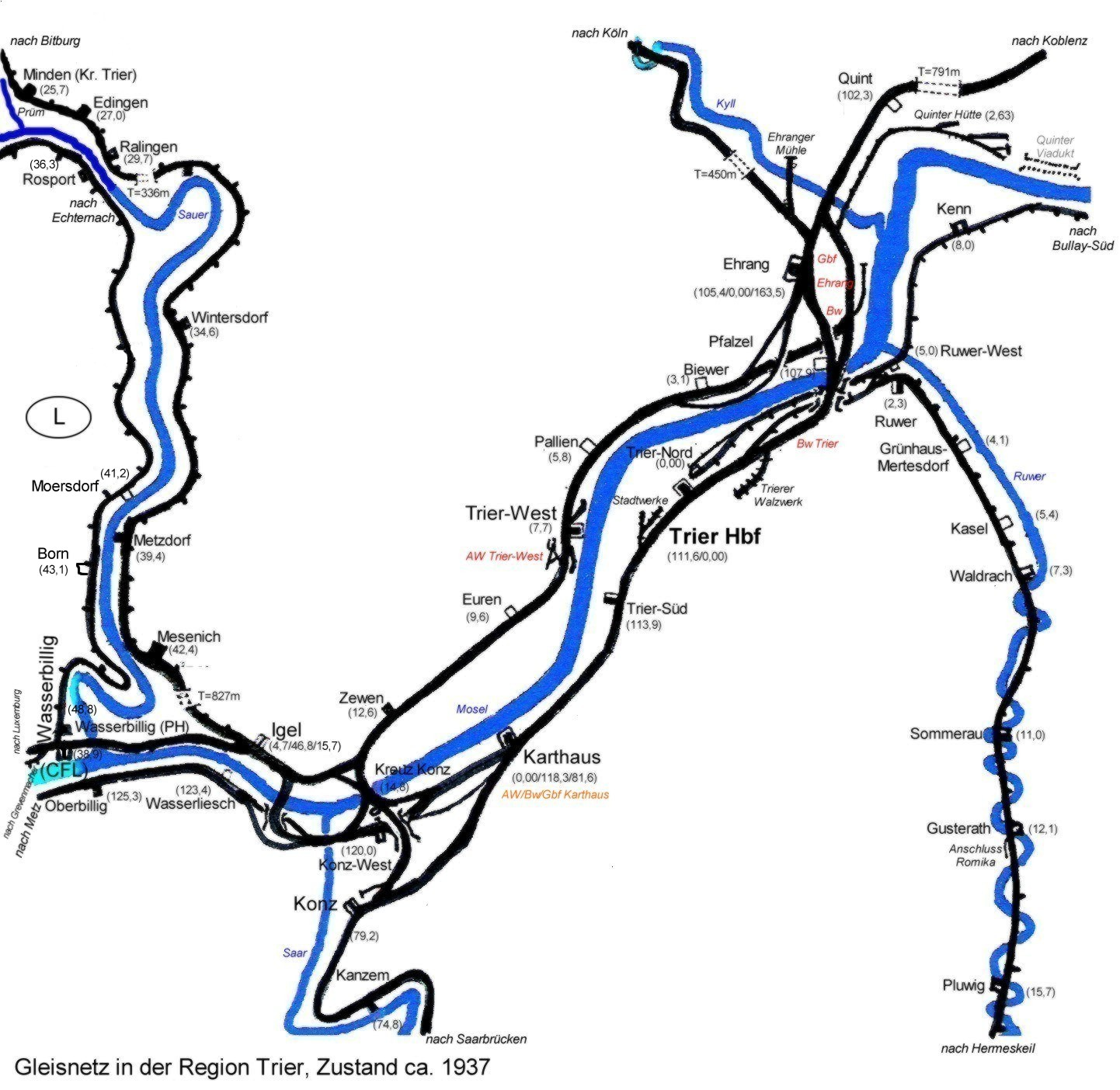
Rail network in the Trier area in 1937

Ehrang station was formerly the second most important station, after Trier Hauptbahnhof, in the city of Trier in the German state of Rhineland-Palatinate. It was closed to passengers on 3 March 2025. It was replaced by the nearby Trier Hafenstraße station. The station forms a railway junction with a former marshalling yard that is still partly used as a freight yard. At the station, the Eifel Railway from Cologne connects with the Koblenz–Trier railway. Until 1983, Ehrang station was also the starting point of the Trier West Railway to Igel that connected with Wasserbillig / Luxembourg.

== History ==
Ehrang station was opened in 1870 by the Rhenish Railway Company (Rheinische Eisenbahn-Gesellschaft). General operations began on 25 March 1871 at the opening of the railway from Trier to Gerolstein, including the section of line west of the station that became part of the Trier West Railway. The station building at Ehrang resembled those along this line, which were each built as small "palaces" (Schlösser). These were financed from the money that France had to pay as reparations to Germany after the Franco-Prussian War. It was expected that it would take many years to settle this debt. But in a one-time payment the whole debt was repaid. Now the German Empire could afford to erect these stations. The design of the building in Ehrang comes from the famous architect Julius Carl Raschdorff, who also designed the stations of Kyllburg, Bitburg-Erdorf and Speicher.

As part of the strategic Kanonenbahn ("cannons railway") from Berlin to Metz, now in France, the railway from Koblenz along the Mosel to Trier was built between 1874 and 1879, making Ehrang station a small railway junction.

The entrance building is still largely in its original state, although it is no longer owned by Deutsche Bahn.

== Entrance building ==
The entrance building, including the side buildings and the water tower, are listed under the Rhineland-Palatinate Monument Protection Act (Denkmalschutzgesetz) as a cultural monument.

The water tower is a spherical water tank that was built on a cone-shaped base of cast iron plates between 1907 and 1913. Today, the water tower is a relatively rare representative of the water towers built around 1900 to the Intze design.

The ensemble of the entrance building, rail sheds and employees accommodation was built with red sandstone façades.

The whole ensemble is listed at the address of Ehranger Straße 2, 3, 4, 5, 7 and 8.

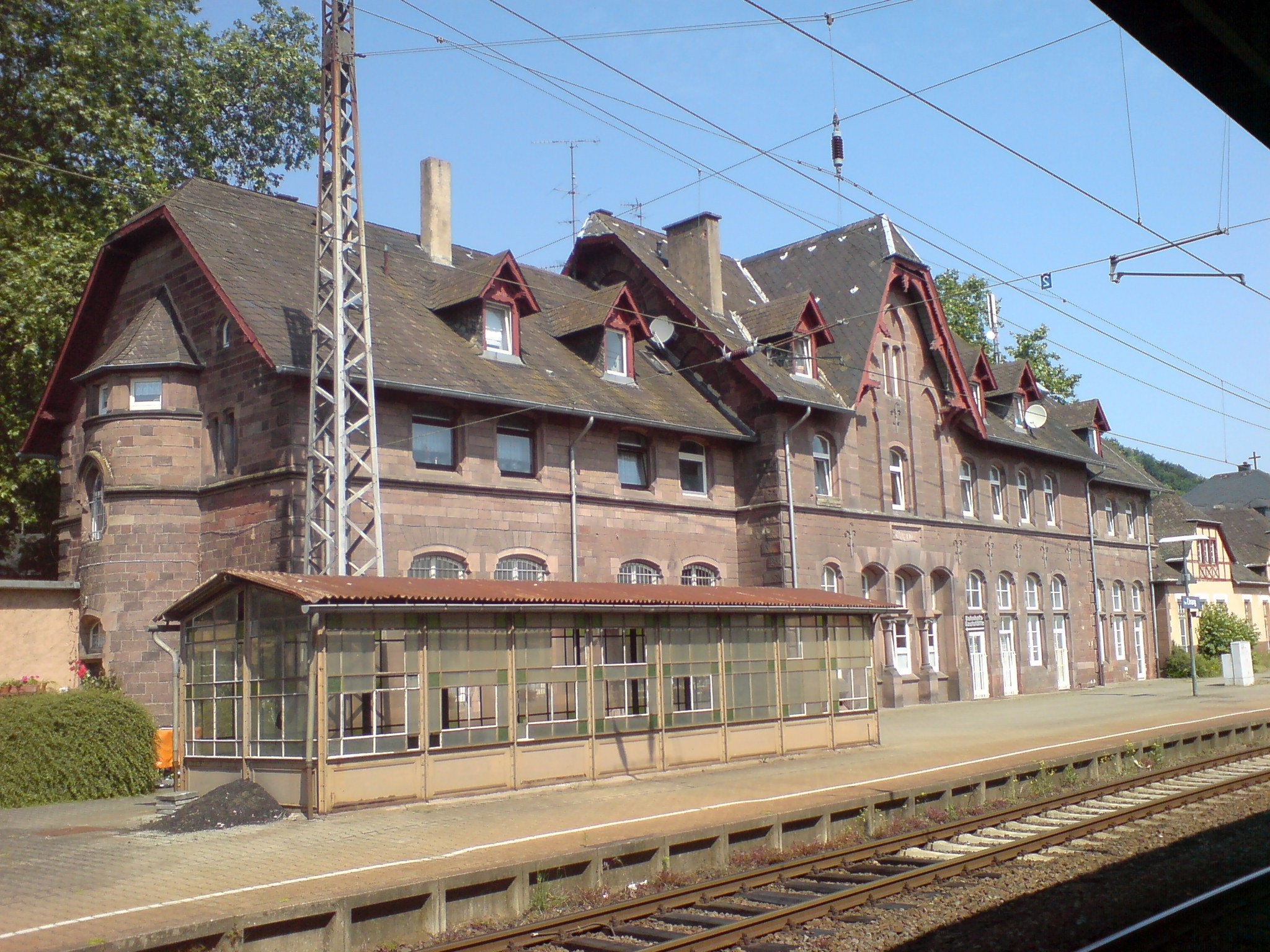
Entrance building (no longer in use) seen from the tracks

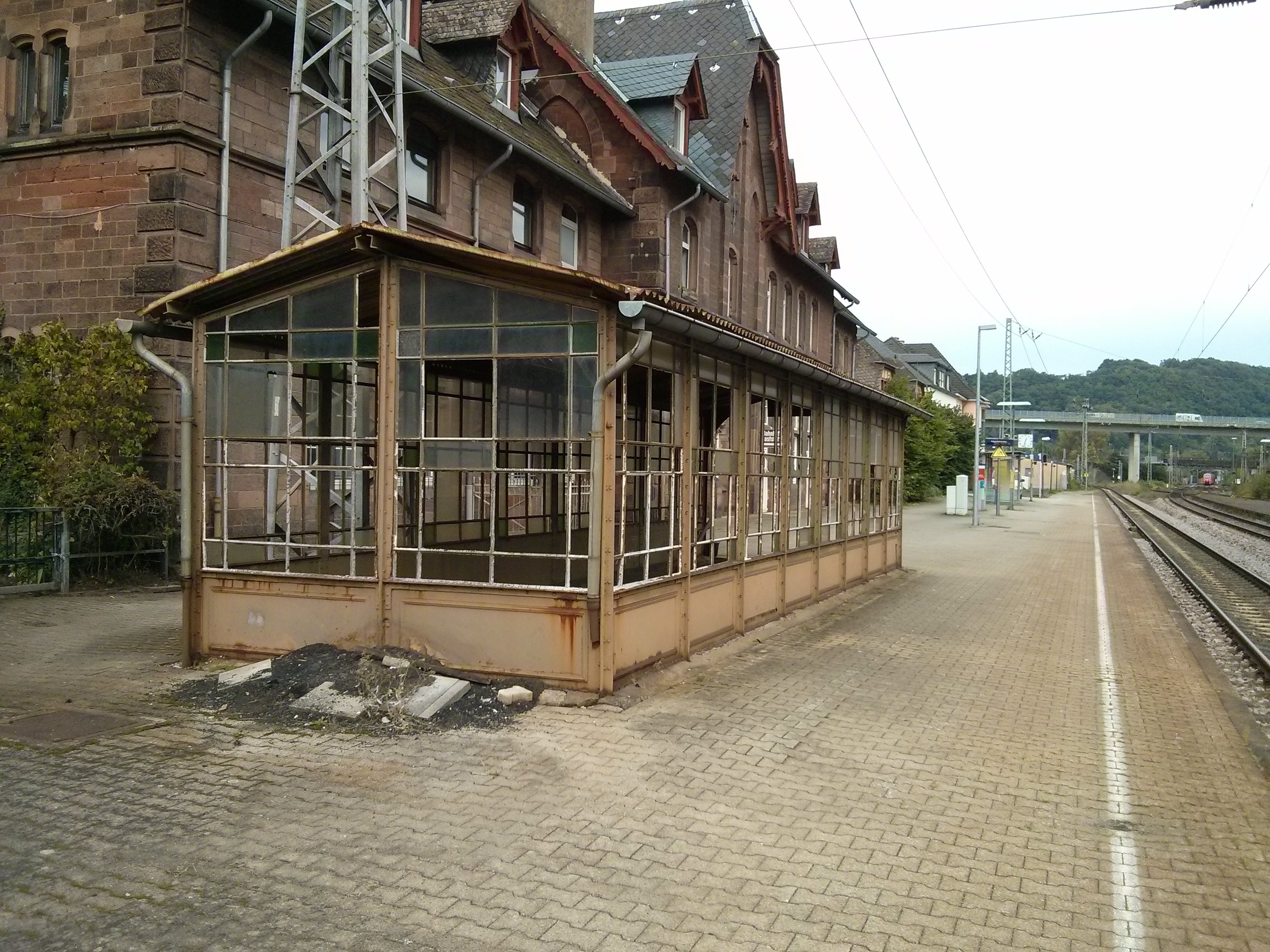
Platform 1: the roofing of the underpass has suffered greatly from wear and vandalism

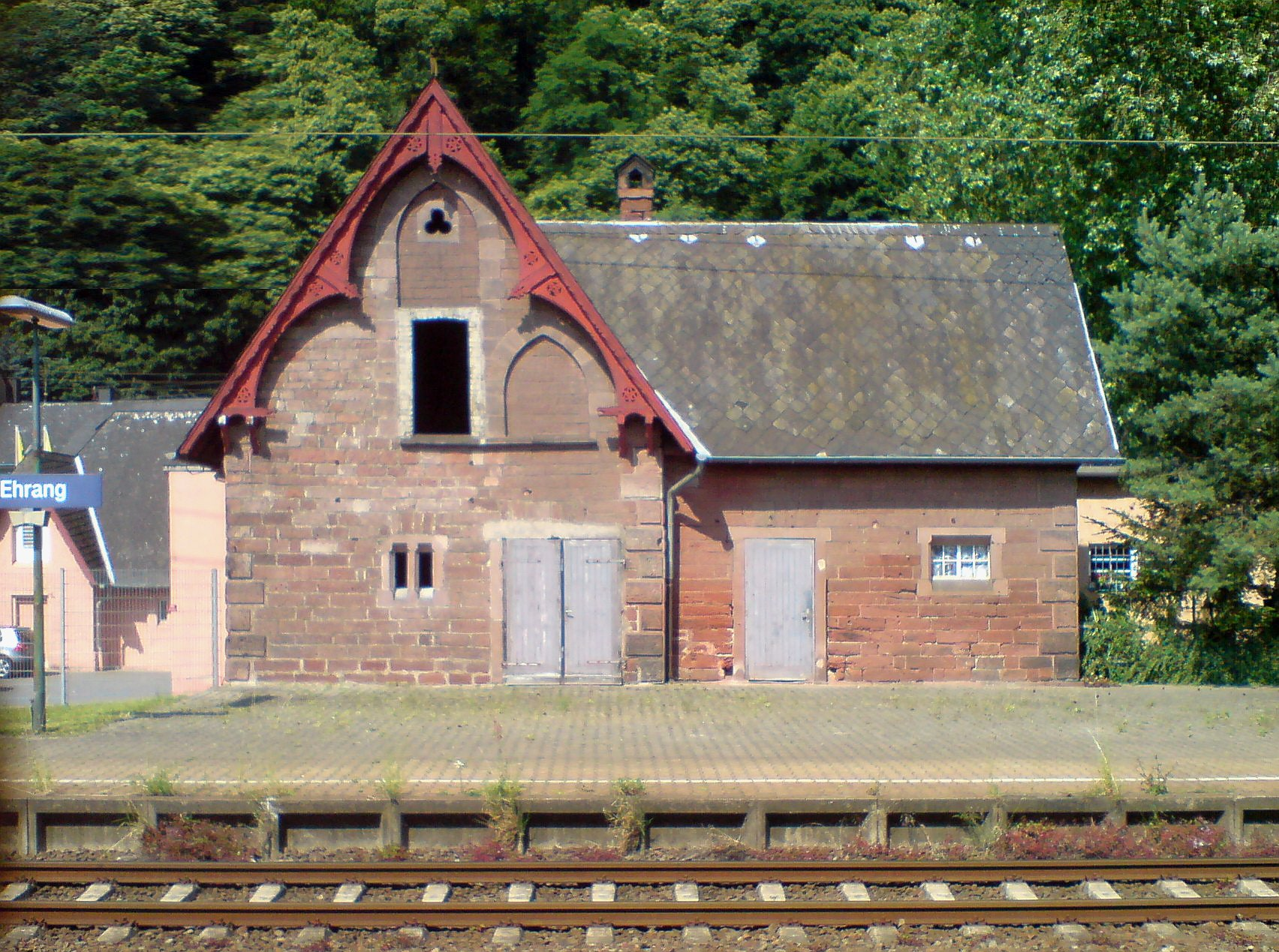
Adjacent building, on platform 1 south of the entrance building

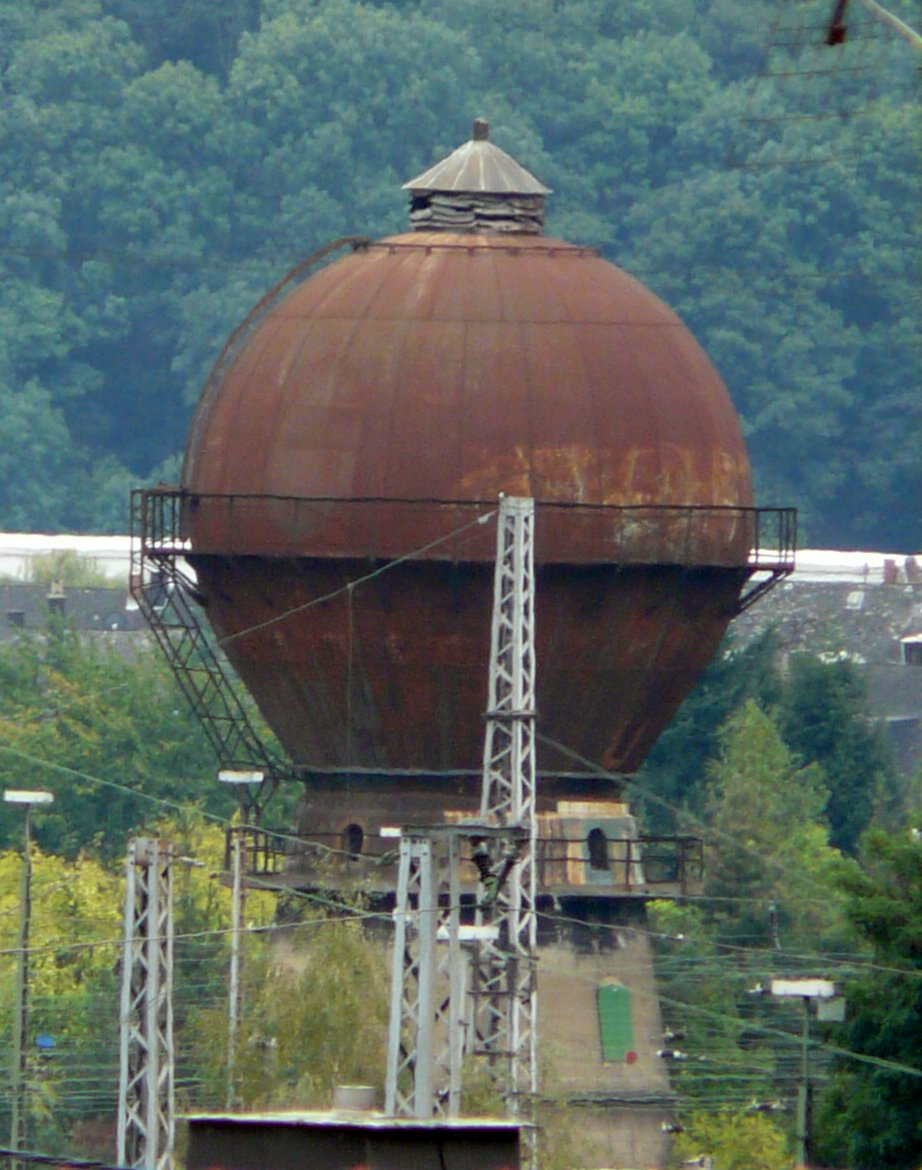
Water tower
