= Something to Believe In (Ramones song) =

Single by Ramones

from the album Animal Boy
- Released: May 1986
- Recorded: December 1985
- Length: 4:09
- Label: Sire
- Songwriters: Dee Dee Ramone, Jean Beauvoir
- Producer: Jean Beauvoir

Ramones singles chronology
"Bonzo Goes to Bitburg" (1985)	"Something to Believe In" (1986)	"Somebody Put Something in My Drink" (1985)

Music video
- "Something to Believe In" on YouTube

"Something to Believe In" is a song that was originally released as a single called the "Sire Single Version", and then re-recorded as a song on the Ramones album Animal Boy released in May 1986. There are also live video versions of the song. It was written by Dee Dee Ramone and Jean Beauvoir. The "Sire Single Version" was re-released as track 14 of the second disk of the Ramones Anthology. The song was re-released in 2005 by Rhino/Warner Bros, on the album Weird Tales of the Ramones.

The song is more gentle sounding than most Ramones songs, particularly the cover by the Pretenders, which was produced by Johnny Ramone and is sung at an extremely slow tempo for a Ramones song.

== Ramones Aid ==
"Something to Believe In" was also the background track for a music video called "Ramones Aid" which was frequently played on MTV. In the video, the Ramones are depicted in a group of people who give money to charity. The video parodies the style of the 1985 "We Are the World" project by USA for Africa. It refers to Hands Across America by featuring T-shirts with the logo "Hands Across Your Face" and showing various hands holding each other in various settings. A large number of people appear in Ramones Aid, including Mark Holton, Animotion, Afrika Bambaataa, Circle Jerks, John Doe and Exene Cervenka of X, the B-52's, Berlin, Fishbone, Ron Mael and Russell Mael of Sparks, Ted Nugent, Spinal Tap, Weird Al Yankovic, Penn and Teller, the Untouchables, Toni Basil, Rodney Bingenheimer, the Bongos, Tom Petersson, Holly Beth Vincent, Richie Stotts, the Cruzados, False Prophets, the Pandoras, Rudy Sarzo, the Rattlers, Carla Olson, Gary U.S. Bonds, Mary Woronov, and more. The video also included lookalikes for some musicians who appeared in "We Are the World": Michael Jackson, Lionel Richie, and Cyndi Lauper.

== Awards ==
"Something to Believe In" was nominated for the New York City Music Award, for best video clip, and was only surpassed by Peter Gabriel's "Sledgehammer". The album the song was on took New York City Music Awards best album, the other single track on the album took best single.

== Pretenders version ==
The final version which was one of the last production accomplishments of Johnny Ramone, and was done shortly before his death, was a cover version by the Pretenders. It was included on the album We're a Happy Family: A Tribute to Ramones.
