= Bitburg controversy =

1985 US presidential visit to West Germany

Coordinates: 49.9634°N 6.5127°E

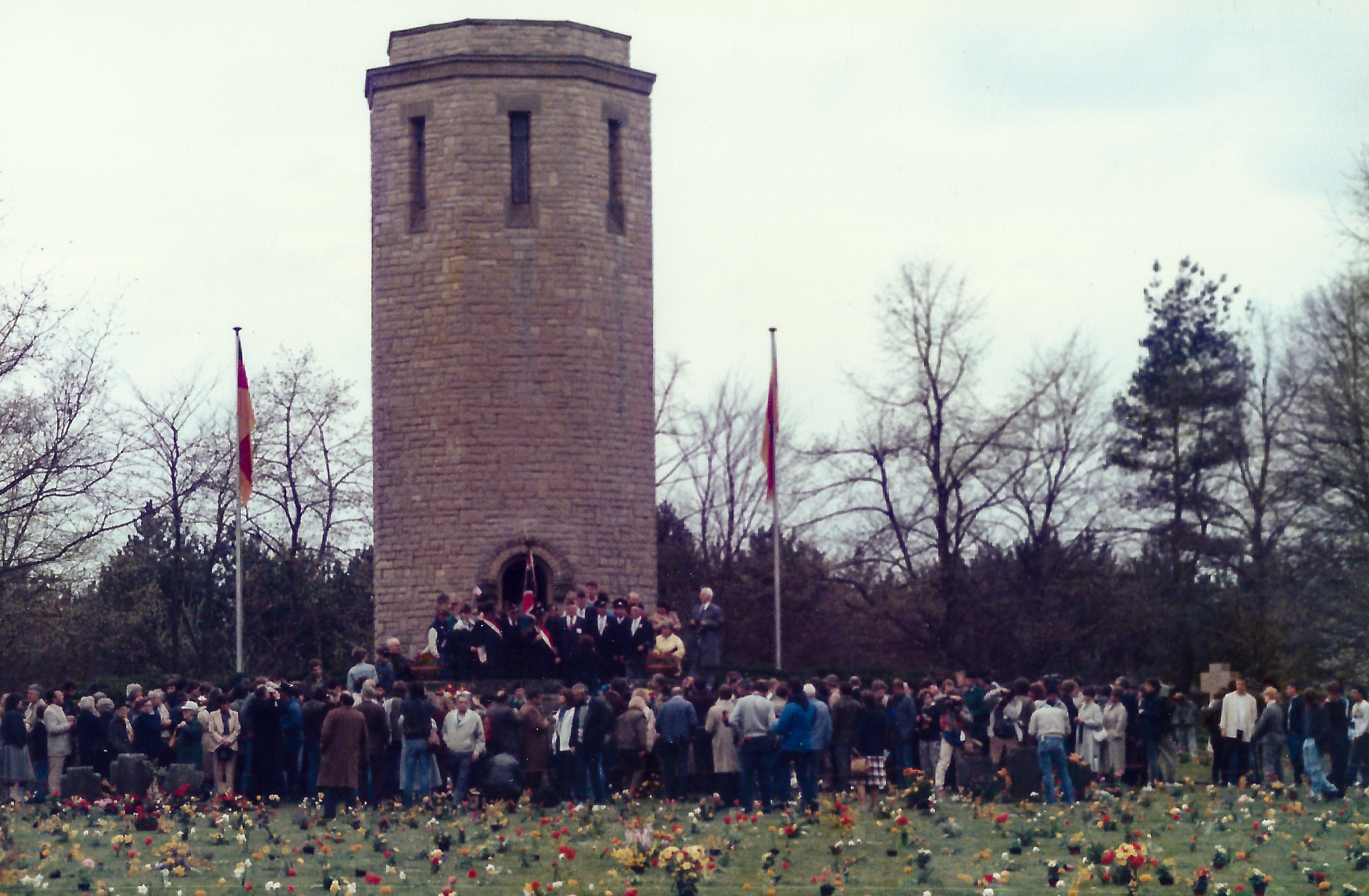
The cemetery after the ceremony

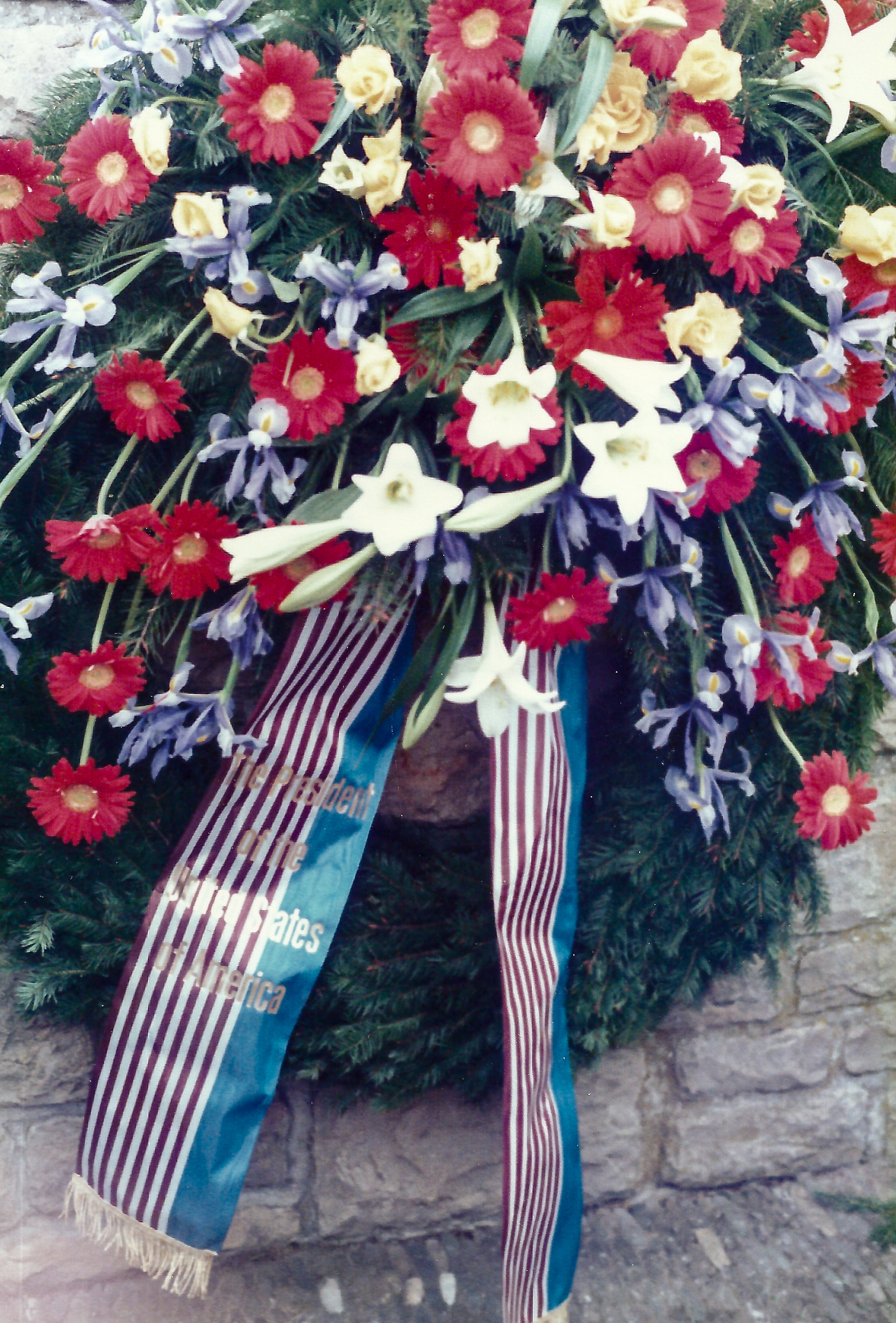
President's Wreath

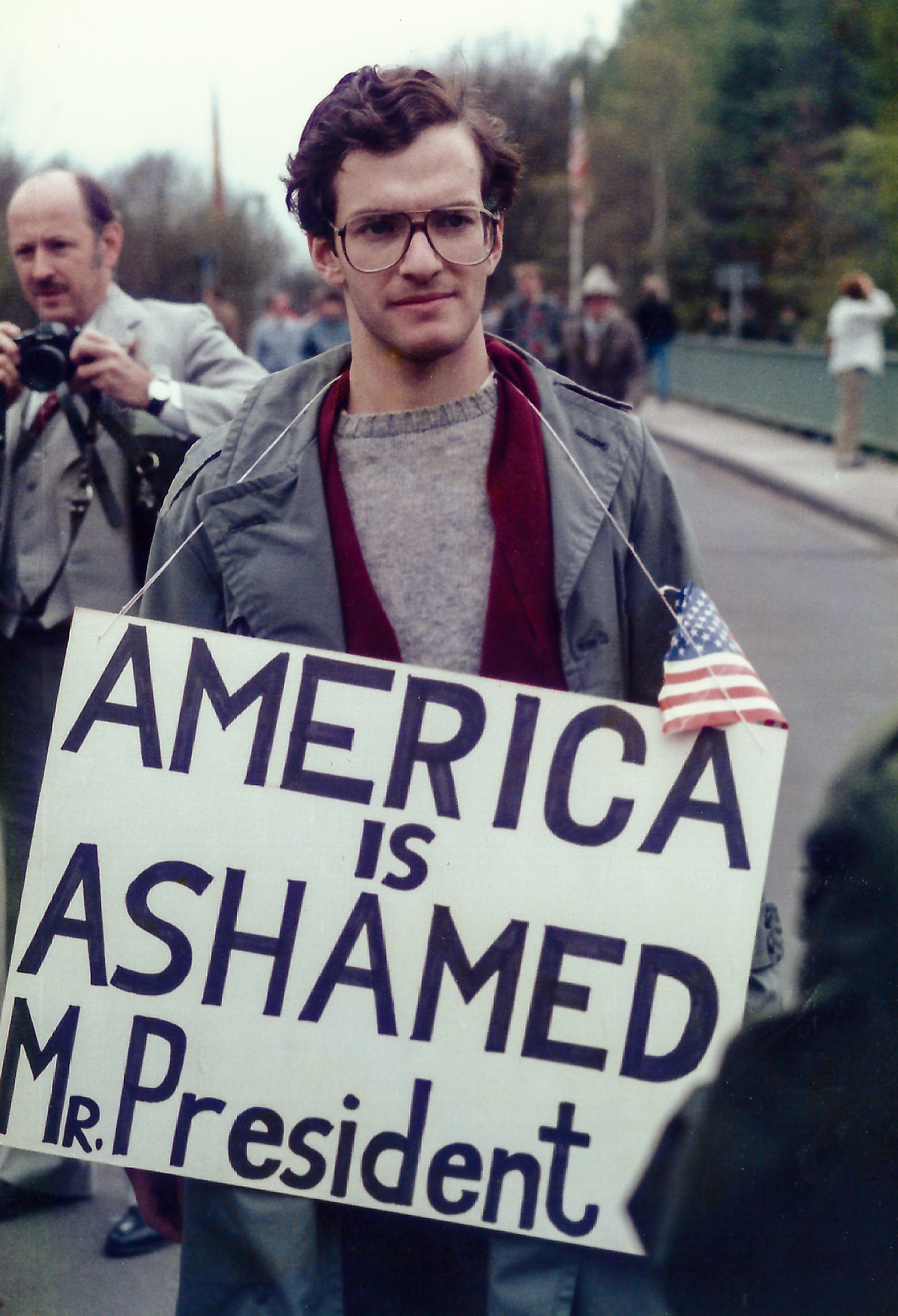
Protester with sign

The Bitburg controversy concerned a ceremonial visit by Ronald Reagan, the incumbent President of the United States, to a German military cemetery in Bitburg, West Germany in May 1985. The visit was intended to commemorate the 40th anniversary of the end of World War II in Europe, but aroused considerable criticism from Jewish communities within the United States and around the world when it became known that 49 of the 2,000 German soldiers buried at the site had been members of the Waffen-SS, the military arm of Nazi Germany's Schutzstaffel (SS). The entire SS had been judged to be a criminal organisation at the Nuremberg trials. Although not part of the original itinerary, as part of their own reconciliatory gesture, Reagan and West German Chancellor Helmut Kohl made an impromptu visit to the Bergen-Belsen concentration camp before visiting Bitburg, thus reducing the time Reagan had to spend at Kolmeshöhe Military Cemetery to only eight minutes.

== Controversy ==
=== The proposed visit ===
Reagan was scheduled to attend the G7 economic summit in Bonn the week of the 40th anniversary of V-E Day. Chancellor Kohl saw an opportunity to demonstrate the strength of the friendship that existed between West Germany and its former foe. During a November 1984 visit to the White House, Kohl appealed to Reagan to join him in symbolising the reconciliation of their two countries at a German military cemetery. It was suggested that the Kolmeshöhe Cemetery, near Bitburg, was both suitably close and relevant, as 11,000 Americans attached to a nearby airbase lived in harmony with the same number of Germans.

Reagan agreed, and later told an aide he felt he owed Kohl, who despite considerable public and political opposition had stood steadfast with Reagan on the deployment of Pershing II missiles in West Germany. In February 1985, then White House Deputy Chief of Staff Michael Deaver made a planning visit to Bitburg. At Kolmeshöhe Cemetery, the 32 rows of headstones were covered with snow. Deaver and his team failed to notice that among them were 49 members of the Waffen-SS. A decision was made by the Reagan team not to include a visit to a concentration camp, as had been previously suggested by Kohl. The President said he did not want to risk "reawakening the passions of the time" or offend his hosts by visiting a concentration camp.

On April 11, 1985, then White House Press Secretary Larry Speakes informed the media of the planned visit to Bitburg. When asked who was buried at Kolmeshöhe, Speakes said he thought both American and German soldiers were there.

Reporters soon discovered that no American servicemen were in the cemetery (in fact, the remains of all U.S. soldiers had long since been removed from German soil) and that Waffen-SS graves were located close to the proposed ceremony. When questioned, Bitburg Mayor Theo Hallet stated that all German military cemeteries were likely to contain some SS graves. Decorations and memorials on the Waffen-SS graves were removed just prior to Reagan's visit.

=== Response ===
This planned visit caused a great deal of anger within the United States and abroad. Many prominent government officials, U.S. Army officers and celebrities, each with ties, or friends with ties to their respective Jewish communities, all protested the planned visit. Fifty-three senators (including 11 Republicans) signed a letter asking the president to cancel, this number eventually went to 82. Furthermore, 257 representatives (including 84 Republicans) signed a letter urging Chancellor Kohl to withdraw the invitation. Catherine Lalumiere, who was the French secretary of state for European affairs, said that she "shared the emotions" brought on by the cemetery. German newspapers Die Zeit and Der Spiegel gave negative commentary to the Chancellor's idea to invite Reagan to the cemetery. Holocaust survivor Elie Wiesel told Reagan personally not to attend.

Chancellor Kohl responded in an interview with The New York Times: "I will not give up the idea. If we don't go to Bitburg, if we don't do what we jointly planned, we will deeply offend the feelings of [my] people." A poll revealed that 72% of West Germans thought the visit should go forward as planned. Kohl admitted that rarely had German–American relations been so strained, and in the days leading up to the visit, the White House and the Chancellery were each blaming the other. The White House claimed that the Germans had given assurances that nothing in the Bitburg visit would be an "embarrassment" for the President: "As clumsily as we handled it, Kohl and his Co. have surpassed us in spades." A German official said: "The Americans also have a responsibility toward the president. They must also check on the history that is beneath their ground. It was not very intelligent."

Reagan defended himself by saying:

These [SS troops] were the villains, as we know, that conducted the persecutions and all. But there are 2,000 graves there, and most of those, the average age is about 18. I think that there's nothing wrong with visiting that cemetery where those young men are victims of Nazism also, even though they were fighting in the German uniform, drafted into service to carry out the hateful wishes of the Nazis. They were victims, just as surely as the victims in the concentration camps.

Reagan was criticised for this statement by opponents of the visit. Equating Nazi soldiers with Holocaust victims, responded Rabbi Alexander M. Schindler, president of the Union of American Hebrew Congregations, was "a callous offence for the Jewish people". Some believed Communications Director Pat Buchanan had written the statement, which he denied in 1999. Kohl confirmed an earlier press comment that in the last days of the war he was able to avoid service in the SS because he was only 15, "but they hanged a boy from a tree who was perhaps only two years older with a sign saying 'traitor' because he had tried to run away rather than serve."

Kohl made a call to the White House days before Reagan's visit to make sure the President was not wavering in the face of criticism, not to mention pressure from Reagan's wife, Nancy. The Chancellor's aide, Horst Teltschik, later said: "Once we knew about the SS dead at Bitburg – knowing that these SS people were seventeen to eighteen years of age, and knowing that some Germans were forced to become members of the SS, having no alternative – the question was, Should this be a reason to cancel?" Reagan aide Robert McFarlane later said: "Once Reagan learned that Kohl would really be badly damaged by a withdrawal, he said 'We can't do that; I owe him.'" Prior to sending Deaver back to West Germany for the third time, just two days before the scheduled visit, Reagan told his deputy chief of staff: "I know you and Nancy don't want me to go through with this, but I don't want you to change anything when you get over there, because history will prove I'm right. If we can't reconcile after forty years, we are never going to be able to do it".

=== Visit and amended itinerary ===
On Sunday 5 May, Reagan and Kohl appeared at the Bergen-Belsen concentration camp. The U.S. President's speech there, according to Time, was a "skilful exercise in both the art of eulogy and political damage control". Reagan said:

All these children of God, under bleak and lifeless mounds, the plainness of which does not even hint at the unspeakable acts that created them. Here they lie, never to hope, never to pray, never to live, never to heal, never to laugh, never to cry... And then, rising above all this cruelty, out of this tragic and nightmarish time, beyond the anguish, the pain and suffering, and for all time, we can and must pledge: never again.

Reagan spent only eight minutes at the Kolmeshöhe Cemetery along with Kohl, 90-year-old General Matthew Ridgway, who had commanded the 82nd Airborne in World War II and Luftwaffe ace and former head of NATO, General Johannes Steinhoff. After Reagan placed a wreath at the cemetery memorial, they all stood to attention while a short trumpet salute was played. At the end, Steinhoff turned and, in an unscripted act, shook hands with Ridgway. A surprised Kohl later thanked Steinhoff, who said that it seemed to be the right thing to do.

Security was heavy for the five-kilometre (3 mi) route from the NATO airbase at Kolmeshöhe, lined with 2,000 policemen – one posted every 4 metres (12 ft): few protesters showed up. When Reagan arrived at the cemetery, Michael Moore and a Jewish friend of his whose parents were at Auschwitz were there with a banner that read "We came from Michigan, USA to remind you: They killed my family".

They were shown live on TV networks across the country. Reagan made one last appearance with Kohl at the airbase, before 7,500 spectators waving American and West German flags. Kohl thanked the President for staying the course: "This walk... over the graves of soldiers was not an easy walk. I thank you personally as a friend that you undertook this walk with me". Reagan responded: "This visit has stirred many emotions in the American and German people too. Some old wounds have been reopened, and this I regret very much, because this should be a time of healing".

== See also ==
- Myth of the clean Wehrmacht
- Bonzo Goes to Bitburg
- Yaroslav Hunka scandal
