= Bonzo Goes to College =

1952 film by Frederick de Cordova

- 1952 film poster
- Directed by: Frederick De Cordova
- Screenplay by: Leo Lieberman; Jack Henley
- Story by: Leo Lieberman
- Produced by: Ted Richmond
- Starring: Maureen O'Sullivan; Edmund Gwenn; Charles Drake; Gigi Perreau; Gene Lockhart; Bonzo
- Cinematography: Carl E. Guthrie
- Edited by: Ted Kent
- Music by: Frank Skinner
- Production company: Universal-International Pictures
- Distributed by: Universal-International Pictures
- Release date: September 11, 1952
- Running time: 80 minutes
- Country: United States
- Language: English

Bonzo Goes to College is a 1952 American comedy sports film directed by Frederick De Cordova and starring Maureen O'Sullivan, Edmund Gwenn, Charles Drake, Gigi Perreau and Gene Lockhart. It is a sequel to the 1951 film Bedtime for Bonzo.

== Plot ==
Former lab chimpanzee Bonzo, suddenly literate, escapes from a carnival sideshow. He lands in the college town of Pawlton, where young Betsy mistakenly believes that Bonzo is a gift from her grandfather Pop Drew, the college's football coach.

Betsy wants to adopt Bonzo, but parents, Marion and Malcolm Drew, have reservations. A judge supports the idea and pretends to officially approve an adoption just to humor Betsy. Betsy writes to her other grandfather, millionaire Clarence Gateson, to inform him she now has a baby brother. Gateson is thrilled until he arrives in Pawlton and learns the truth.

Gateson warms to Bonzo and takes him golfing. Discovering that Bonzo is a natural athlete, an idea is hatched for Bonzo to play quarterback for the college, where Pop is desperate for good players. Con men Edwards and Wilbur Crane kidnap Bonzo just before the big game and replace him with a chimpanzee that cannot play football. Before the con men can collect their bets, the real Bonzo appears and wins the game.

== Cast ==
- Maureen O'Sullivan as Marion Gateson Drew
- Edmund Gwenn as Ten "Pop" Drew
- Charles Drake as Malcolm Drew
- Gigi Perreau as Betsy Drew
- Gene Lockhart as Clarence B. Gateson
- Penny as Bonzo
- Irene Ryan as Nancy
- John Miljan as Wilbur Crane
- Frank Nelson as Dick
- Jerry Paris as Edwards
- Guy Williams as Ronald Calkins
- Richard Garrick as Judge George Simpkins
- Tom Harmon as Tom Harmon
- Lee Miller as Lamson, Gateson's attorney

== Production ==
The chimpanzee featured in the film is not the same that had appeared in Bedtime for Bonzo. The first chimpanzee had been killed in a fire on March 4, 1951 and its second cousin was used for the sequel.

Production began in late March 1952 and wrapped by early May.

== See also ==
- List of American football films
