= Bedtime for Bonzo =

- Original 1951 film poster
- Directed by: Fred de Cordova
- Screenplay by: Val Burton; Lou Breslow
- Story by: Ted Berkman; Raphael David Blau
- Produced by: Michael Kraike
- Starring: Ronald Reagan; Diana Lynn
- Cinematography: Carl E. Guthrie
- Edited by: Ted Kent
- Music by: Frank Skinner
- Color process: Black and white
- Production company: Universal International Pictures
- Distributed by: Universal Pictures
- Release dates: February 15, 1951 (Circle Theatre, Indianapolis); April 5, 1951 (United States)
- Running time: 83 minutes
- Country: United States
- Language: English
- Box office: $1,225,000 (rentals)

The film's trailer

Bedtime for Bonzo is a 1951 American comedy film directed by Fred de Cordova and starring Ronald Reagan, Diana Lynn and a chimpanzee (its name is reported as either Peggy or Tamba) as Bonzo. Its central character, a psychology professor (Reagan), tries to teach human morals to a chimpanzee, hoping to solve the "nature versus nurture" question.

A sequel, Bonzo Goes to College, was released in 1952, but featured none of the three lead performers from the original film.

== Plot ==
Valerie Tillinghast, daughter of a prominent college dean, is engaged to psychology professor Peter Boyd. When Tillinghast's father discovers that Peter is the son of a former criminal, he forbids the marriage, declaring Peter's blood to be tainted, in line with his strong belief in heredity as an influence on character. As Peter believes equally strongly in the opposite, he aims to prove that he can raise a chimpanzee as one would a human child in a law-abiding household.

After acquiring a chimpanzee named Bonzo from colleague Hans Neumann, Peter seeks a nanny, ultimately settling on a young woman named Jane. Together, they act as Bonzo's parents, teaching him good habits and providing the simulation of a loving family environment. One afternoon, Bonzo inadvertently turns on the vacuum cleaner and leaps out of the window in alarm, climbing a tree. Jane takes chase, and Bonzo jumps back into the house and dials the emergency services as he has been instructed to do. He then returns to the tree and removes the ladder, leaving Jane stranded until Peter can help her. Valerie arrives just as the firemen are helping them down and misreads the situation, angrily returning Peter's ring.

Tillinghast warns that Bonzo is to be sold to Yale University for medical research, and Jane overhears Peter and Neumann discussing the imminent end of the experiment. As she's developed romantic feelings for Peter, Jane is so shocked that she allows Bonzo to escape on his tricycle. Peter follows him to a jewelry store, where Bonzo grabs a necklace. When Bonzo refuses to return it, Peter tries to do so himself, only to be arrested. Jane instructs Bonzo to surrender the necklace as he has been taught; he obediently returns to the store and replaces it where he had found it in the window. With the experiment judged a success, Tillinghast decides not to sell Bonzo and bestows his blessing on Peter and Jane's impending marriage.

== Cast ==
- Ronald Reagan as Professor Peter Boyd
- Diana Lynn as Jane Linden
- Walter Slezak as Professor Hans Neumann
- Lucille Barkley as Valerie Tillinghast
- Jesse White as Babcock
- Herbert Heyes as Dean Tillinghast
- Herb Vigran as Lt. Daggett
- Harry Tyler as Knucksy
- Ed Clark as Foskick
- Ed Gargan as Policeman
- Joel Friedkin as Mr. De Witt
- Brad Browne as Chief of Police
- Elizabeth Flourney as Miss Swithen
- Howard Banks as Policeman
- Perc Launders as Fireman
- Brad Johnson as Student
- Billy Mauch as Student
- Ann Tyrrell as Telephone Operator

== Production ==
During production, Reagan was nearly suffocated by the chimpanzee when it pulled on his necktie. After Reagan broke free, the tie had to be cut by a crewmember in order to remove it.

The chimpanzee's name was either Peggy or Tamba; conflicting names are provided in media accounts. It had won a PATSY Award for its work in My Friend Irma Goes West (1950), understood 500 commands and earned $500 per week. Reagan was scheduled to present the 1951 PATSY Award with the chimpanzee, but it was killed in a fire on March 4, 1951.

== Reception ==
A. H. Weiler of The New York Times called the film "a minor bit of fun yielding a respectable amount of laughs but nothing, actually, over which to wax ecstatic." Variety described it as "a lot of beguiling nonsense with enough broad situations to gloss over plot holes ... Cameras wisely linger on the chimp's sequences and his natural antics are good for plenty of laughter." Richard L. Coe of The Washington Post wrote, "If you can stomach all this, you'll find some giggles in this farce, which is okay when paying attention to the recently deceased chimp, but is perfectly terrible when trying to tell its story. Ronald Reagan, as the naive professor of things mental, must have felt like the world's sappiest straight man playing this silly role, and the others aren't much better off."

On the review aggregator website Rotten Tomatoes, the film holds an approval rating of 67%, based on 12 reviews, with an average rating of 5.83/10.

== Sequel ==
In 1952, the sequel Bonzo Goes to College was released. However, none of the original three leads appeared. As the chimpanzee that appeared in Bedtime for Bonzo had died, another was hired. Reagan declined a role in the sequel, which he believed to be implausible.

== Legacy ==
As president, Reagan screened the film for staff and guests at Camp David.

Derisive references to the film by critics of Reagan were common during his presidency; examples include the song "Bonzo Goes to Bitburg" by the Ramones and the album Bedtime for Democracy by Dead Kennedys.
