= Somebody Put Something in My Drink =

- 1986 UK 7" single cover

Single by Ramones

from the album Animal Boy
- Released: May 1986
- Recorded: December 1985
- Genre: Punk rock
- Length: 3:25
- Label: Sire
- Songwriter: Richie Ramone
- Producer: Jean Beauvoir

Ramones singles chronology
"Something to Believe In" (1986)	"Somebody Put Something in My Drink" (1986)	"Pet Sematary" (1989)

"Somebody Put Something in My Drink" is a song by the Ramones from their 1986 album Animal Boy. The song also appears on the Ramones compilation album Ramones Mania. Written by Ramones drummer Richie Ramone, who had joined the band in 1983, "Somebody Put Something in My Drink" was based on an actual incident in which he was given a drink spiked with LSD.

This song has been covered by Children of Bodom, The Meteors, Plan 4, Nosferatu, Mortifer, Farben Lehre, Acid Drinkers, Reincidentes, The Gobshites and The Beasts. Australian band Tequila Mockingbyrd included a cover on their album Fight And Flight. Pop-punk band Spazboy recorded the song for the 2001 tribute album, Ramones Maniacs. Greek punk group Panx Romana recorded the song with altered lyrics in their native language.

A music video for this song was filmed, but for financial reasons, never completed and released. However, a rough cut of the track can be found on the Ramones: It's Alive! 1974–1996 DVD. This version was performed without Richie Ramone. The song was featured in the 1987 movie Like Father Like Son with Dudley Moore, Kirk Cameron, and Sean Astin as well as Cabin Fever 2: Spring Fever.

Richie Ramone recorded a version of the song for his 2013 solo album Entitled, which only appeared on the vinyl version of the album.

The cover image of the single is of Prince Randian, from the 1932 movie, Freaks.
