= Bitburg =

- Town
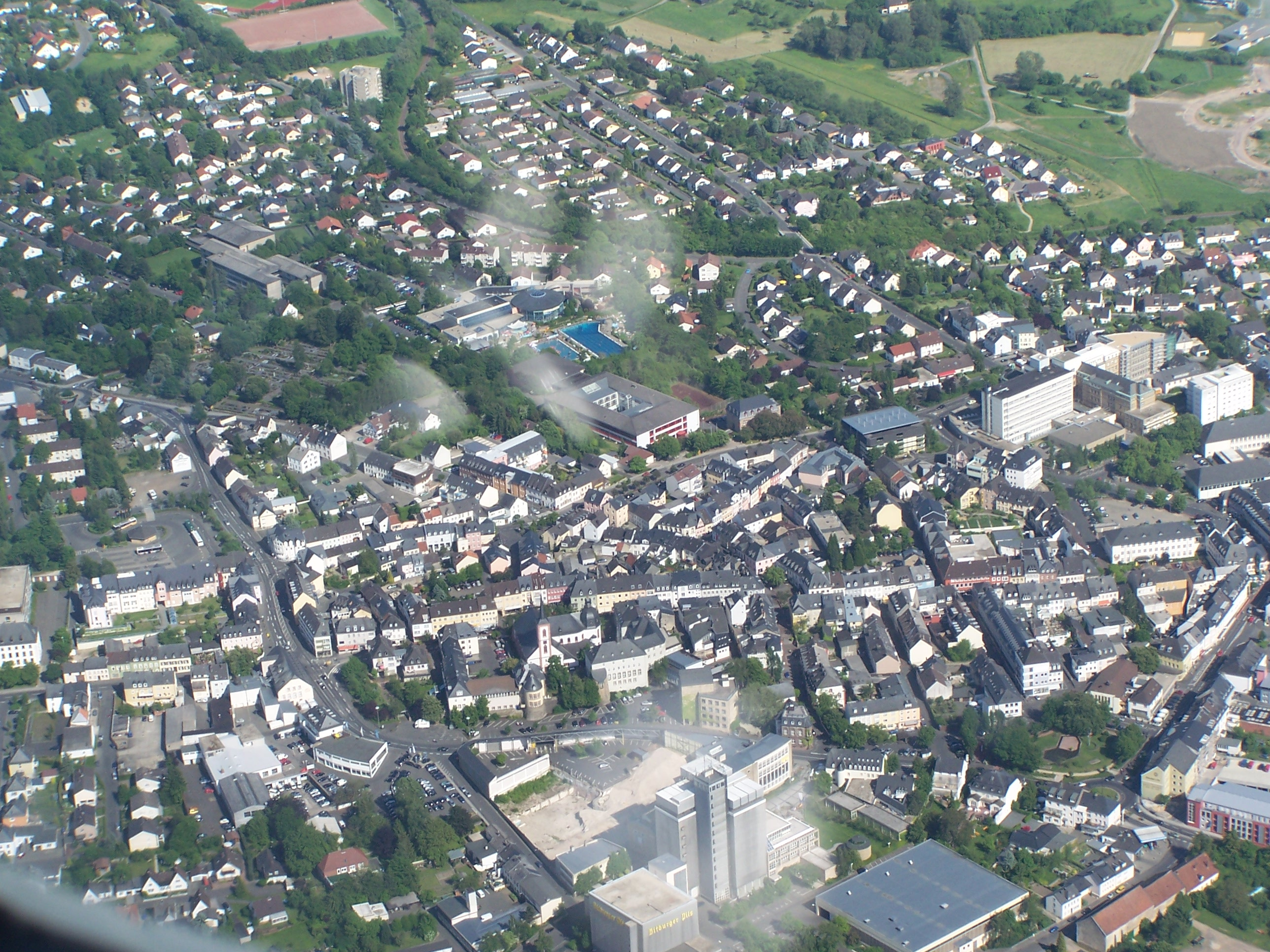

- Coat of arms

- Location of Bitburg within Eifelkreis Bitburg-Prüm district
- Interactive map of Bitburg
- Location within Germany Location within Rhineland-Palatinate
- Coordinates: 49°58′N 06°32′E
- Country: Germany
- State: Rhineland-Palatinate
- District: Eifelkreis Bitburg-Prüm

Government
  - Mayor (2017–25): Joachim Kandels (CDU)

Area
  - Total: 47.55 km^{2} (18.36 sq mi)
- Elevation: 320 m (1,050 ft)

Population (2025-12-31)
  - Total: 15,559
  - Density: 327.2/km^{2} (847.5/sq mi)
- Time zone: UTC+01:00 (CET)
  - Summer (DST): UTC+02:00 (CEST)
- Postal codes: 54634
- Dialling codes: 06561
- Vehicle registration: BIT
- Website: www.bitburg.de

Bitburg (German pronunciation: [ˈbɪtbʊʁk]; French: Bitburg; Luxembourgish: Béibreg [ˈbɜɪ̯bʀəɕ]) is a town in Germany, in the state of Rhineland-Palatinate approximately 25 km (16 mi.) northwest of Trier and 50 km (31 mi.) northeast of Luxembourg City. The American Spangdahlem Air Base is located nearby.

== History ==
Historical affiliations

County of Luxembourg 1239–1353
Duchy of Luxembourg 1353–1795
French Republic 1795–1804
French Empire 1804–1815
Kingdom of Prussia 1815–1871
German Empire 1871–1918
Weimar Republic 1918–1933
Nazi Germany 1933–1945
Allied-occupied Germany 1945–1949
West Germany 1949–1990
Germany 1990–present

The city's name derives from its Celtic toponym, Beda.

Bitburg originated approximately two thousand years ago as a stopover for traffic from Lyon through Metz and Trier to Cologne. The first name mentioned was Vicus Beda. Emperor Constantine the Great expanded the settlement to a road castle around 330, the central part of which forms the city centre today. Bitburg is first documented only after the end of the Roman Empire around 715 as castrum bedense. It subsequently became part of Franconia.

The first mention of Bitburg in historic annals occurred in connection with the signing in 1239 of the Trier-Luxembourg Treaty between Archbishop Theoderich II of Trier and Countess Ermesinde II of Luxemburg, under which the town came under the archbishopric's protection. Bitburg received a town charter in 1262 from Count Henry V of Luxembourg.

In 1443, Bitburg came under the sway of the Duchy of Burgundy, then in 1506 was acquired by the Austrian Netherlands, which controlled most of modern Belgium. In 1794 the city came under French administration, and in 1798 became part of the newly created department of Forêts. This led to a short lived economic upturn, and Bitburg received among other things a court and a land registry.

In 1815, under agreements at the Congress of Vienna following the final defeat of Napoleon, Bitburg was, after having been a part of the Duchy of Luxembourg for centuries, transferred to the Kingdom of Prussia, where until 1822 it belonged administratively to the Grand Duchy of the Lower Rhine, and afterwards to the Rhine Province. With the unification of Germany under Prussian dominance in 1871, Bitburg became part of the German Empire, and after World War I it went under the jurisdiction of Weimar Republic.

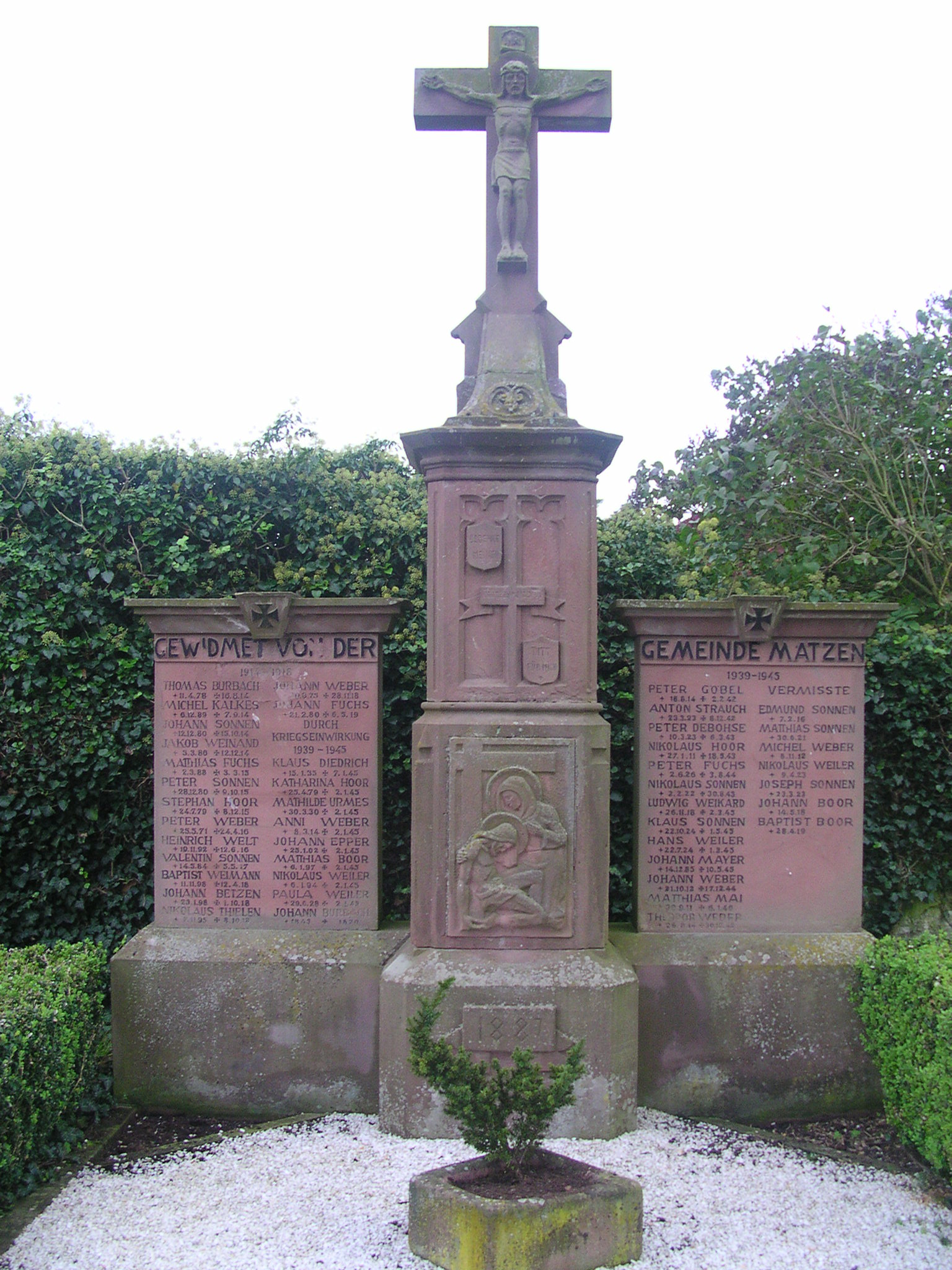
Memorial to soldiers of two world wars

During the interwar period Bitburg, like most of the Eifel region, was impoverished and comparatively backward. Economic growth began after Adolf Hitler's rise to power and the Nazi regime's introduction of employment-boosting public works projects, including infrastructure for war, particularly the Siegfried Line; new armed forces barracks; and the development of the Nims-Sauer Valley railway. It is said that the building now used as the post office at Bitburg Annex (what is left of Bitburg Air Base) was the headquarters for Adolf Hitler when he was in the city.

In late December 1944, Bitburg was 85% destroyed by Allied bombing attacks, and later officially designated by the United States Armed Forces as a "dead city." Subsequently, the city was occupied by Luxembourg Armed Forces, who were replaced by French Armed Forces in 1955.

In 1952 a North Atlantic Treaty Organization (NATO) base was opened at Bitburg by the United States Air Force. At the end of the 1980s, French Armed Forces were withdrawn and NATO took over the former French barracks. After the Gulf War most of the United States Air Force were moved to the larger Spangdahlem Air Base, about 12 km east of Bitburg. In 1994, NATO turned the Bitburg Airport over to the city, which devoted it to public works projects. The Nims-Sauer Valley railway was abandoned step by step, beginning in 1969. Parts of it were converted into a bicycle path (Radweg).

In 1985, Bitburg came to international attention due to a ceremonial visit by President of the United States Ronald Reagan and Chancellor of Germany Helmut Kohl to the nearby Kolmeshöhe Military Cemetery—which, among its two thousand graves, included those of 49 members of the Waffen-SS.

== Economy ==
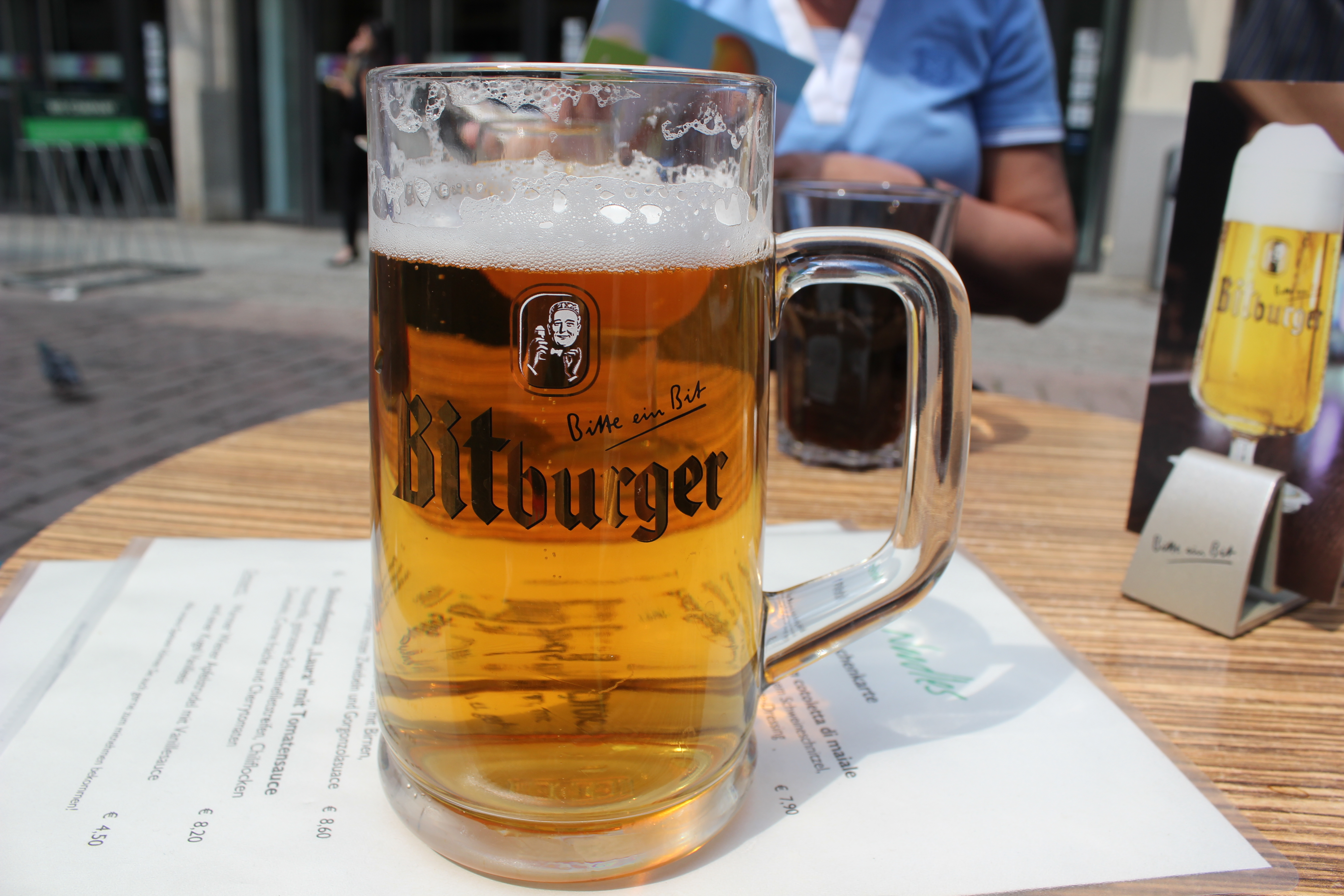
Bitburger Pilsener

The most widely known Bitburg enterprise, and landmark of the city, is the Bitburger Brewery. Its Pilsner-style lager beer ranks No. 3 among Germany's best selling beers, with sales of 3.86 million litres (in 2008).

In 1995, the former NATO base was designated the Bitburg Airfield Trade Area, providing commercial development district where 180 enterprises have established themselves.

== Transport ==
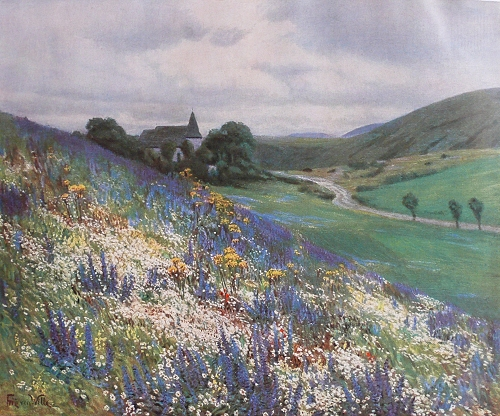
Fritz von Wille: Die blaue Blume

Bitburg-Erdorf station is part of the Hürth-Kalscheuren–Ehrang railway (KBS 474). Trains that pass through include:

- The Eifel Mosel express (RE 12) – Cologne, Euskirchen, Gerolstein, Trier
- The Eifel line (RB 83) – Gerolstein, Trier

The nearest airports are Luxembourg Airport (61 km away) and Hahn Airport (79 km away).

== Points of interest ==
The Regional Museum of Bitburg-Prüm is housed in a former agricultural school. It contains numerous artifacts of the history of Bitburg and the Eifel region in general.

In the cultural centre Haus Beda are exhibited works of the Düsseldorf painter Fritz von Wille (1860-1941), the Eifel's most widely known artist. More than 100 paintings are on display, including Die blaue Blume, Mosenberg, Burg Reifferscheid im Winter and Ein klarer Tag.

== International relations ==
Bitburg is partnered or sistered with:

- Arlon, Belgium since 1965
- Bad Köstritz (Thuringia), Germany since 1992
- Diekirch, Luxembourg since 1962
- Rethel, France since 1965
- (United States) Shelbyville, Kentucky (U.S.) since 1962

== Notable people ==
- Jean-Marc Barr (born 1960), French actor, director, filmmaker and screenwriter
- Tom G. Palmer (born 1956), American libertarian author and theorist
- Bertram Schäfer (born 1946), racing driver
- Charles-Mathias Simons (1802-1874), Luxembourgish jurist and politician
- Marina Mohnen (born 1978), German wheelchair basketball national player and paralympic gold medalist
