= Foo Fighters discography =

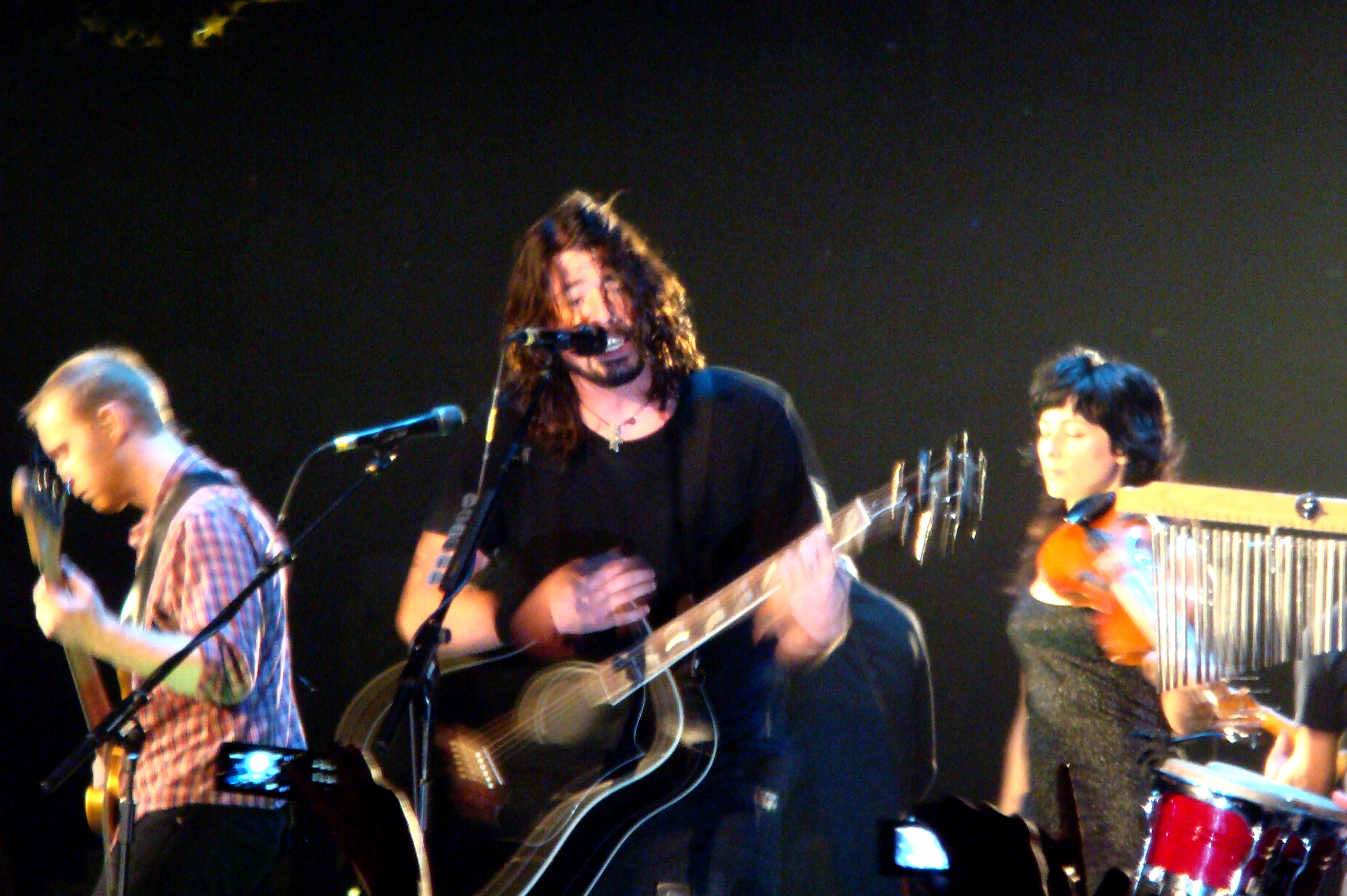
- Foo Fighters in 2007
- Studio albums: 12
- Extended plays: 16
- Live albums: 1
- Compilation albums: 4
- Singles: 57
- Video albums: 6
- Music videos: 59
- Other appearances: 51

The discography of Foo Fighters, an American rock band formed in 1994 by Dave Grohl, consists of twelve studio albums, sixteen extended plays (EPs), six video albums, one live album, and 57 singles (including promotional releases). The current Foo Fighters line-up consists of Grohl (vocals and guitar), Nate Mendel (bass), Pat Smear (guitar), Rami Jaffee (keyboards), Chris Shiflett (guitar), and Ilan Rubin (drums).

In October 1994, Grohl recorded an album's worth of songs in which he played all instruments in Seattle's Robert Lang Studios. He chose the name "Foo Fighters" for the project to hide his identity and passed cassette copies of the sessions to personal friends. After those tapes attracted record label interest, Grohl signed with Capitol Records, who released the results as the album Foo Fighters in 1995. The album peaked at number 23 on the Billboard 200, earning a platinum certification in the United States and having lead single, "This Is a Call" on the top 10 of the UK and Australia. After extensive touring with a full-fledged band—along with Grohl were Mendel, Smear and drummer William Goldsmith—the band went into recording follow-up album The Colour and the Shape, released in 1997. The record charted higher, reaching number 10 on the Billboard 200, and with certifications of Platinum in Australia and Canada and double platinum in the US. The "Everlong" single from the album has been certified 2× Platinum in the US.

Following the tour for The Colour and the Shape, Foo Fighters left Capitol and Grohl decided to build a home studio in Alexandria, Virginia wanting a production away from studio interference, given the troubled recording of the previous album, which led to the departure of Goldsmith and Smear. Along with Mendel and new drummer Hawkins, Grohl recorded Foo Fighters' third album, There Is Nothing Left to Lose, in 1999 and signed a distribution deal with RCA Records, which remains their label as of 2021. The band again got certifications of platinum in the US, Australia and Canada, and had its first single to chart on the US Billboard Hot 100 with "Learn to Fly".

Foo Fighters' fourth album, One by One (2002), marked the first studio foray with Shiflett and was their first to top the charts in the United Kingdom and Australia. The album's tour resulted in the band's first video album, 2003's Everywhere but Home, featuring live concert footage from the One by One tour. Grohl led the construction of a professional studio in Los Angeles in 2004, and the band recorded its next two studio albums there: 2005's In Your Honor, a top five hit in both the UK and Australia and origin of the band's highest-scoring single "Best of You", and 2007's Echoes, Silence, Patience & Grace, which topped the charts in Australia, Belgium, Canada, and the UK and had three songs atop the Billboard Modern Rock Tracks chart. The former's tour of acoustic concerts resulted in the live album Skin and Bones (2006), while the latter tour had two gigs at Wembley Stadium recorded on the DVD Live at Wembley Stadium (2008). The band's first compilation, 2009's Greatest Hits, became their sixth album to surpass 1 million copies sold in the United States.

In 2011, the album Wasting Light was released, recorded at Grohl's home in Los Angeles, and debuting at number one in twelve countries. The album's first single "Rope" holds the record for the most consecutive weeks at number one on the US Rock Songs chart. Their eighth studio album, Sonic Highways, was recorded in eight different American cities and released in 2014. As of 2015 the band's eight studio albums have sold 12 million copies in the US alone. Foo Fighters' ninth album, Concrete and Gold, was released on September 15, 2017 and became the band's second #1 album in the United States.

Medicine at Midnight is the tenth studio album by American rock band Foo Fighters. Originally scheduled for 2020, the album was delayed to February 5, 2021 due to the COVID-19 pandemic.

But Here We Are is the eleventh studio album, released on June 2, 2023. It was the first Foo Fighters album released after the passing of the drummer Taylor Hawkins in March 2022.

Your Favorite Toy was released on April 24, 2026, and is their 12th studio album.

== Albums ==
=== Studio albums ===
List of studio albums, with selected chart positions and certifications
Title	Album details	Peak chart positions										Sales	Certifications
Title	Album details	US	AUS	AUT	CAN	GER	IRL	NLD	NZ	SWI	UK	Sales	Certifications
Foo Fighters	Released: June 26, 1995; Label: Roswell, Capitol; Formats: CD, LP, CS	23	3	13	5	33	—	22	2	26	3	US: 1,468,000; UK: 374,187	RIAA: Platinum; ARIA: Gold; BPI: Platinum; MC: Platinum; RMNZ: Gold
The Colour and the Shape	Released: May 20, 1997; Label: Roswell, Capitol; Formats: CD, LP, CS	10	5	19	8	41	10	39	10	50	3	US: 2,342,000; UK: 672,000	RIAA: Platinum; ARIA: Platinum; BPI: Platinum; BVMI: Gold; MC: Platinum; RMNZ: 2× Platinum
There Is Nothing Left to Lose	Released: November 2, 1999; Label: Roswell, RCA; Formats: CD, LP, CS	10	5	34	4	23	49	53	12	—	10	US: 1,300,000; UK: 588,000	RIAA: Platinum; ARIA: 2× Platinum; BPI: 2× Platinum; MC: Platinum
One by One	Released: October 22, 2002; Label: Roswell, RCA; Formats: CD, DVD, LP, digital download	3	1	19	3	5	1	12	3	28	1	US: 1,400,000; UK: 892,000	RIAA: Platinum; ARIA: 2× Platinum; BPI: 3× Platinum; BVMI: Gold; MC: Platinum; RMNZ: Gold
In Your Honor	Released: June 14, 2005 (June 13 in UK); Label: Roswell, RCA; Formats: CD, LP, digital download	2	1	5	3	4	2	5	1	7	2	US: 1,500,000; UK: 812,000	RIAA: Platinum; ARIA: 3× Platinum; BPI: 2× Platinum; BVMI: Gold; IFPI AUT: Gold; IRMA: 2× Platinum; MC: 3× Platinum; RMNZ: 4× Platinum
Echoes, Silence, Patience & Grace	Released: September 25, 2007; Label: Roswell, RCA; Formats: CD, LP, digital download	3	1	4	1	3	2	6	1	2	1	US: 916,000; UK: 754,000	RIAA: Platinum; ARIA: 2× Platinum; BPI: 2× Platinum; BVMI: Platinum; IFPI AUT: Gold; IRMA: Platinum; MC: Platinum; RMNZ: 2× Platinum
Wasting Light	Released: April 12, 2011; Label: Roswell, RCA; Formats: CD, LP, digital download	1	1	1	1	1	3	2	1	1	1	US: 663,000; UK: 520,000	RIAA: Platinum; ARIA: 2× Platinum; BPI: Platinum; BVMI: Platinum; IFPI AUT: Gold; IFPI SWI: Gold; IRMA: Gold; MC: Platinum; NVPI: Gold; RMNZ: 2× Platinum
Sonic Highways	Released: November 10, 2014; Label: Roswell, RCA; Formats: CD, LP, digital download	2	1	3	3	2	5	2	2	2	2	US: 490,000; UK: 316,770	ARIA: Platinum; BPI: Platinum; BVMI: Gold; IFPI AUT: Gold; MC: Platinum; NVPI: Gold; RMNZ: Platinum
Concrete and Gold	Released: September 15, 2017; Label: Roswell, RCA; Formats: CD, LP, digital download	1	1	1	1	2	1	1	1	1	1	US: 212,750	ARIA: Platinum; BPI: Gold; IFPI SWI: Gold; MC: Gold; RMNZ: Platinum
Medicine at Midnight	Released: February 5, 2021; Label: Roswell, RCA; Formats: CD, LP, digital download	3	1	1	3	1	1	1	1	1	1		BPI: Gold
But Here We Are	Released: June 2, 2023; Label: Roswell, RCA; Formats: CD, LP, CS, digital download	8	1	2	4	4	3	2	1	1	1	US: 168,000	BPI: Silver
Your Favorite Toy	Released: April 24, 2026; Label: Roswell, RCA; Formats: CD, LP, digital download	23	3	3	55	2	25	13	4	2	2		
"—" denotes a recording that did not chart or was not released in that territory.

=== Compilation albums ===
List of compilation albums, with selected chart positions and certifications
Title	Album details	Peak chart positions										Sales	Certifications
Title	Album details	US	AUS	AUT	CAN	GER	IRL	NLD	NZ	SWI	UK	Sales	Certifications
Greatest Hits	Released: November 3, 2009; Label: RCA; Formats: CD, LP, digital download	11	1	10	6	8	6	9	1	15	4	US: 1,009,000; UK: 1,500,000	ARIA: 6× Platinum; BPI: 5× Platinum; BVMI: 3× Gold; IFPI AUT: Gold; IRMA: Platinum; MC: Gold; RMNZ: 5× Platinum
Medium Rare	Released: April 16, 2011; Label: Roswell, RCA; Formats: LP, CD (limited edition)	— (Note: Medium Rare did not enter the US Billboard 200, but peaked at number five on the US Vinyl Albums Chart.)	—	—	—	—	—	51	—	—	164		
Hail Satin (as Dee Gees)	Released: July 17, 2021; Label: RCA; Formats: LP, digital download	27	31	—	—	—	27	18	—	—	17		
The Essential Foo Fighters	Released: October 28, 2022; Label: Sony; Formats: 2×LP, CD, digital	42	5	19	43	20	19	88	1	37	10		BPI: Platinum; RMNZ: 2× Platinum
"—" denotes a recording that did not chart or was not released in that territory.

=== Live albums ===
List of live albums, with selected chart positions and certifications
Title	Album details	Peak chart positions										Certifications
Title	Album details	US	AUS	AUT	CAN	GER	IRL	NZ	SWE	SWI	UK	Certifications
Skin and Bones	Released: November 7, 2006; Label: RCA; Formats: CD, LP	21	11	30	7	67	33	1	51	40	35	ARIA: Gold; IRMA: Gold; BPI: Platinum

== Extended plays ==
List of extended plays, with selected chart positions
Title	Extended play details	Peak chart positions				
Title	Extended play details	US	AUT	BEL	SCO	UK
Five Songs and a Cover	Released: November 20, 2005; Label: RCA; Formats: CD	—	—	—	—	—
iTunes Festival: London 2011	Released: 2011; Label: RCA; Formats: Digital download	—	—	—	—	167
Songs from the Laundry Room	Released: April 18, 2015; Label: RCA; Formats: "10" vinyl, digital download	— (Note: Songs from the Laundry Room did not enter the US Billboard 200, but peaked at number 20 on the US Vinyl Albums Chart.)	—	—	—	—
Saint Cecilia	Released: November 23, 2015; Label: RCA; Formats: "12" vinyl, digital download	117	63	74	20	35
Are Playing Where??? Vol. I	Released: October 3, 2025; Label: RCA; Formats: Digital download	—	—	—	—	—
Are Playing Where??? Vol. II	Released: August 6, 2026; Label: RCA; Formats: Digital download	—	—	—	—	—

=== Foo Files EPs ===
Starting in 2019, the band has released their archive of B-sides and live performances in digital EPs called the Foo Files.

Foo Files
Title	Extended play details
00950025	Released: July 5, 2019; Two songs recorded at Reading Festival 1995, and another at The Chapel in 2000
00111125 – Live in London	Released: July 16, 2019; Same performance from the iTunes Festival: London 2011 EP
00070725 Live at Studio 606	Released: September 13, 2019; 2007 performance at the band's own studio
00050525 Live in Roswell	Released: September 20, 2019; 2005 concert at Walker Air Force Base, released on the day of Raid Area 51
01070725	Released: September 27, 2019; B-sides from Echoes, Silence, Patience & Grace
00020225	Released: October 18, 2019; B-sides from One by One
01050525	Released: November 8, 2019; B-sides from In Your Honor
00999925	Released: December 13, 2019; B-sides from There Is Nothing Left to Lose
00979725	Released: December 20, 2019; B-sides from The Colour and the Shape
00959525	Released: January 3, 2020; B-sides from Foo Fighters

== Singles ==
=== 1990s ===
List of singles released in the 1990s decade, showing selected chart positions and certifications
Title	Year	Peak chart positions										Certifications	Album
Title	Year	US	US Alt	US Main. Rock	AUS	CAN	EU	NLD	NZ	SCO	UK	Certifications	Album
"This Is a Call"	1995	— (Note: "This is a Call" did not enter the Billboard Hot 100 due to the lack of an American physical release, but peaked at number 35 on the Billboard Hot 100 Airplay (Radio Songs).)	2	6	9	29	14	32	11	7	5	ARIA: Gold; BPI: Silver	Foo Fighters
"I'll Stick Around"	1995	— (Note: "I'll Stick Around" did not enter the Billboard Hot 100 due to the lack of an American physical release, but peaked at number 51 on the Billboard Hot 100 Airplay (Radio Songs) chart.)	8	12	61	—	49	—	—	24	18		Foo Fighters
"For All the Cows"	1995	—	—	—	69	—	70	—	—	37	28		Foo Fighters
"Big Me"	1996	— (Note: In the US, "Big Me" was released as a 7-track maxi single making it ineligible for the Billboard Hot 100 singles chart because it had more than four songs, but having sold more than 5,000 copies it should have charted at number 175 on the Billboard 200 album chart but was not included on the chart due to a production error. It peaked at number 13 on the Billboard Hot 100 Airplay (Radio Songs) chart.)	3	18	65	15	58	—	—	18	19	ARIA: Gold; BPI: Silver; RMNZ: Gold	Foo Fighters
"Monkey Wrench"	1997	— (Note: "Monkey Wrench" did not enter the Billboard Hot 100 due to the lack of an American physical release, but peaked at number 58 on the Billboard Hot 100 Airplay (Radio Songs) chart.)	9	9	17	37	51	—	—	10	12	ARIA: 2× Platinum; BPI: Platinum; RMNZ: Platinum	The Colour and the Shape
"Everlong"	1997	— (Note: "Everlong" did not enter the Billboard Hot 100 due to the lack of an American physical release, but peaked at number 42 on the Billboard Hot 100 Airplay (Radio Songs) chart.)	3	4	28	—	36	—	31	13	18	RIAA: 2× Platinum; ARIA: 8× Platinum; BPI: 4× Platinum; RMNZ: 9× Platinum	The Colour and the Shape
"My Hero"	1998	— (Note: "My Hero" did not enter the Billboard Hot 100 due to the lack of an American physical release, but peaked at number 59 on the Billboard Hot 100 Airplay (Radio Songs) chart.)	6	8	74	— (Note: "My Hero" did not enter the Canadian Singles Chartbut peaked at number 19 on the Hot Canadian Digital Song Sales chart in 2021.)	53	—	—	19	21	ARIA: 3× Platinum; BPI: Platinum; RMNZ: 3× Platinum	The Colour and the Shape
"Walking After You" (Note: The original version of "Walking After You" appeared on the album The Colour and the Shape. However the version that appeared on the X-Files soundtrack and was released as a single was a re-recorded version.)	1998	—	12	—	67	—	87	—	48	15	20		The X-Files soundtrack
"Learn to Fly"	1999	19	1	2	36	13	65	72	23	15	21	RIAA: Platinum; ARIA: 4× Platinum; BPI: 2× Platinum; MC: Gold; RMNZ: 3× Platinum	There Is Nothing Left to Lose
"—" denotes a recording that did not chart or was not released in that territory.

=== 2000s ===
List of singles released in the 2000s decade, showing selected chart positions and certifications
Title	Year	Peak chart positions										Certifications	Album
Title	Year	US	US Alt	US Main. Rock	AUS	CAN	IRL	NLD	NZ	SCO	UK	Certifications	Album
"Stacked Actors" (Note: "Stacked Actors" was released only in Australia as a limited edition single.)	2000	—	25	9	82	—	—	—	—	—	—		There Is Nothing Left to Lose
"Generator" (Note: "Generator" was released only in Australia and as a limited edition single in Europe.)	2000	—	—	—	31	—	—	—	—	—	151	ARIA: Gold	There Is Nothing Left to Lose
"Breakout"	2000	—	8	11	59	—	—	48	—	25	29	ARIA: Gold; BPI: Silver	There Is Nothing Left to Lose
"Next Year"	2000	—	17	—	85	—	—	92	—	33	42		There Is Nothing Left to Lose
"The One" (Note: "The One" was only released in Australia but was made available by import in the US and UK.)	2002	— (Note: "The One" did not enter the Billboard Hot 100 but peaked at number 21 on the Bubbling Under Hot 100 Singles chart.)	14	20	21	×	—	—	—	78	77		Orange County: The Soundtrack
"All My Life"	2002	43	1	3	20	×	14	95	46	5	5	ARIA: 2× Platinum; BPI: Platinum; RMNZ: 2× Platinum	One by One
"Times Like These"	2003	65	5	5	22	× (Note: "Times Like These" did not enter the Canadian Singles Chart which did not exist in 2003 but peaked at number 48 on the Hot Canadian Digital Song Sales chart in 2021.)	27	90	—	12	12	RIAA: Platinum; ARIA: 3× Platinum; BPI: Platinum; RMNZ: Platinum	One by One
"Low"	2003	— (Note: "Low" did not enter the Billboard Hot 100 but peaked at number 10 on the Billboard Hot 100 Singles Sales chart.)	15	23	40	× (Note: "Low" did not enter the Canadian Singles Chart which did not exist in 2003 but peaked at number 30 on Nielsen SoundScan's Canadian physical singles chart which has been archived by Billboard as the Canadian digital chart which later replaced the physical chart.)	44	100	—	20	21		One by One
"Have It All"	2003	—	—	—	71	×	—	—	—	38	37		One by One
"Best of You"	2005	18	1	1	5	×	20	94	38	3	4	RIAA: 2× Platinum; ARIA: 5× Platinum; BPI: 2× Platinum; MC: Gold; RMNZ: 3× Platinum	In Your Honor
"DOA"	2005	68	1	5	39	— (Note: "DOA" did not enter the Canadian Hot 100 which did not exist in 2005 but reached number 16 on the Nielsen BDS Canada chart.)	40	86	34	23	25	RIAA: Gold; ARIA: Gold	In Your Honor
"Resolve"	2005	—	—	—	—	×	—	82	39	24	32		In Your Honor
"No Way Back/Cold Day in the Sun" (Note: "No Way Back" and "Cold Day in the Sun" were released together as a double A-side single and therefore the singles chart positions apply to both songs but the airplay charts only apply to "No Way Back".)	2006	—	2	6	—	— (Note: "No Way Back" did not enter the Canadian Hot 100 which did not exist in 2006 but reached number 37 on the Nielsen BDS Canada chart.)	—	—	—	37	64		In Your Honor
"The Pretender"	2007	37	1	1	10	15	11	39	9	6	8	RIAA: 2× Platinum; ARIA: 6× Platinum; BPI: 3× Platinum; MC: Platinum; RMNZ: 4× Platinum	Echoes, Silence, Patience & Grace
"Long Road to Ruin"	2007	89	1	2	38	42	—	—	21	19	35	ARIA: Platinum; BPI: Silver; RMNZ: Gold	Echoes, Silence, Patience & Grace
"Cheer Up, Boys (Your Make Up Is Running)" (Note: "Cheer Up, Boys (Your Make Up Is Running)" was released as a downloadable single in the UK only.)	2008	—	—	—	—	—	—	—	—	—	194		Echoes, Silence, Patience & Grace
"Let It Die" (Note: "Let It Die" was released as a downloadable single only.)	2008	— (Note: "Let It Die" did not enter the Billboard Hot 100 but peaked at number three on the Billboard Hot 100 Singles Sales chart, on the Bubbling Under Hot 100 Singles chart at number 6, and on the Hot 100 Airplay (Radio Songs) at number 85.)	1	5	—	58	—	—	—	—	—		Echoes, Silence, Patience & Grace
"Wheels"	2009	72	3	4	21	22	38	45	13	17	22	ARIA: Platinum; BPI: Silver; RMNZ: Platinum	Greatest Hits
"—" denotes a recording that did not chart or was not released in that territory. "×" denotes periods where charts did not exist or were not archived

=== 2010s ===
List of singles released in the 2010s decade, showing selected chart positions and certifications
Title	Year	Peak chart positions										Certifications	Album
Title	Year	US	US Alt	US Main. Rock	US Rock	AUS	CAN	NLD	NZ	SCO	UK	Certifications	Album
"Rope"	2011	68	1	1	1	55	41	31	—	22	22	ARIA: Gold; BPI: Silver; RMNZ: Gold	Wasting Light
"Walk"	2011	83	1	1	1	57	49	58	38	48	57	ARIA: Platinum; BPI: Gold; RMNZ: Platinum	Wasting Light
"Arlandria"	2011	—	—	—	—	—	—	—	—	72	79	ARIA: Gold; RMNZ: Gold	Wasting Light
"These Days"	2011	— (Note: "These Days" did not enter the Billboard Hot 100 but peaked at number 11 on the Bubbling Under Hot 100 Singles chart.)	2	3	2	60	63	—	—	—	169	ARIA: Platinum; BPI: Silver; RMNZ: Platinum	Wasting Light
"Bridge Burning"	2012	—	25	14	22	—	75	—	—	—	—		Wasting Light
"Something from Nothing"	2014	— (Note: "Something from Nothing" did not enter the Billboard Hot 100 but peaked at number one on the Bubbling Under Hot 100 Singles.)	1	1	8	53	63	57	32	56	73		Sonic Highways
"Congregation"	2014	—	5	1	21	—	—	— (Note: "Congregation" did not enter the Netherlands' Single Top 100 but peaked at number 24 on the Netherlands' Single Tip Chart.)	—	68	—		Sonic Highways
"Outside"	2015	—	11	7	39	—	—	—	—	—	—		Sonic Highways
"Saint Cecilia"	2015	—	12	3	33	—	—	—	—	—	—		Saint Cecilia (EP)
"Run"	2017	— (Note: "Run" did not enter the Billboard Hot 100 but peaked at number 43 on the Billboard Digital Songs chart, and on the Bubbling Under Hot 100 Singles chart at number 6.)	9	1	7	53	76	— (Note: "Run" did not enter the Netherlands' Single Top 100 but peaked at number 23 on the Netherlands' Single Tip Chart.)	— (Note: "Run" did not enter the NZ Top 40 Singles Chart but peaked at number two on the NZ Heatseeker Singles Chart.)	34	64	ARIA: Gold; MC: Gold; BPI: Silver; RMNZ: Gold	Concrete and Gold
"The Sky Is a Neighborhood"	2017	—	7	1	10	—	— (Note: "The Sky Is a Neighborhood" did not enter the Billboard Canadian Hot 100, but peaked at number 37 on the Canadian All-format Airplay chart.)	— (Note: "The Sky Is a Neighborhood" did not enter the Netherlands' Single Top 100 but peaked at number 24 on the Netherlands' Single Tip Chart.)	— (Note: "The Sky Is a Neighborhood" did not enter the NZ Top 40 Singles Chart but peaked at number seven on the NZ Heatseeker Singles Chart.)	38	63	ARIA: Gold; MC: Gold; BPI: Silver; RMNZ: Gold	Concrete and Gold
"The Line"	2018	—	30	4	41	—	— (Note: "The Line" did not enter the Billboard Canadian Hot 100, but peaked at number 50 on the Canadian All-format Airplay chart.)	—	—	—	—		Concrete and Gold
"—" denotes a recording that did not chart or was not released in that territory.

=== 2020s ===
List of singles released in the 2020s decade, showing selected chart positions
Title	Year	Peak chart positions										Album
Title	Year	US Dig.	US Alt.	US Main. Rock	US Rock	AUS Dig.	CAN	IRL	NLD Tip.	NZ Hot	UK	Album
"Shame Shame"	2020	32	10	1	11	40	— (Note: "Shame Shame" did not enter the Canadian Hot 100 but peaked at number 23 on the Canadian Hot Digital Songs chart.)	—	23	9	77	Medicine at Midnight
"No Son of Mine"	2021	—	— (Note: "No Son of Mine" did not enter the Alternative Airplay chart, but peaked at number 15 on the Alternative Digital Songs chart.)	32	49	—	— (Note: "No Son of Mine" did not enter the Canadian Hot 100 but peaked at number 49 on the Canadian Hot Digital Songs chart.)	—	—	6	— (Note: "No Son of Mine" did not enter the UK Singles Chart, but peaked at number 51 on the UK Singles Downloads Chart.)	Medicine at Midnight
"Waiting on a War"	2021	—	8	1	18	33	95	—	—	10	53	Medicine at Midnight
"Making a Fire"	2021	—	6	1	30	—	— (Note: "Making a Fire" did not enter the Billboard Canadian Hot 100, but peaked at number 50 on the Canadian All-format Airplay chart.)	85	— (Note: "Making a Fire" did not enter the Dutch Top 40 but peaked at number 23 on the Netherlands' Airplay Top 50 Chart.)	6	52	Medicine at Midnight
"Love Dies Young"	2021	—	6	3	— (Note: "Love Dies Young" did not enter the US Hot Rock & Alternative Songs, but peaked at number 3 on the US Rock & Alternative Airplay chart.)	—	—	—	—	—	—	Medicine at Midnight
"Rescued"	2023	—	1	1	12	36	88	—	24	16	— (Note: "Rescued" did not enter the UK Singles Chart, but peaked at number 28 on the UK Singles Downloads Chart.)	But Here We Are
"Under You"	2023	—	1	1	37	—	—	—	—	18	98	But Here We Are
"The Glass"	2023	—	7	1	33	—	—	—	—	16	— (Note: "The Glass" did not enter the UK Singles Chart, but peaked at number 39 on the UK Singles Sales Chart.)	But Here We Are
"Today's Song"	2025	—	2	2	34	48	—	—	—	28	— (Note: "Today's Song" did not enter the UK Singles Chart, but peaked at number 45 on the UK Singles Sales Chart, and at number 40 on the UK Singles Downloads Chart.)	Non-album single
"Asking for a Friend"	2025	—	2	1	26	47	—	—	—	40	— (Note: "Asking for a Friend" did not enter the UK Singles Chart, but peaked at number 61 on the UK Singles Sales chart, and at number 57 on the UK Singles Downloads chart.)	Your Favorite Toy
"Your Favorite Toy"	2026	—	3	1	34	42	—	—	—	30	— (Note: "Your Favorite Toy" did not enter the UK Singles Chart, but peaked at number 23 on the UK Singles Sales chart, and at number 21 on the UK Singles Downloads chart.)	Your Favorite Toy
"Caught in the Echo"	2026	—	—	—	—	—	—	—	—	34	— (Note: "Caught in the Echo" did not enter the UK Singles Chart, but peaked at number 88 on the UK Singles Sales Chart and at number 83 on the UK Singles Downloads chart.)	Your Favorite Toy
"Of All People"	2026	—	—	—	—	—	—	—	—	38	—	Your Favorite Toy
"Window"	2026	—	4	1	— (Note: "Window" did not enter the US Hot Rock & Alternative Songs, but peaked at number 24 on the US Rock & Alternative Airplay chart.)	—	—	—	—	19	—	Your Favorite Toy
"—" denotes a recording that did not chart or was not released in that territory.

=== Promotional singles ===
Title	Year	Peak chart positions										Album
Title	Year	US Alt	US Main. Rock	US Rock	BEL Tip	CAN	CAN Rock	POL	SCO	UK	UK Rock	Album
"Exhausted"	1995	—	—	—	—	—	—	—	—	—	—	Foo Fighters
"Alone+Easy Target"	1996	—	—	—	—	—	—	—	—	—	—	Foo Fighters
"Baker Street"	1998	—	34	— (Note: "Baker Street" did not enter the US Hot Rock & Alternative Songs but peaked at number 20 on the US Active Rock chart.)	—	—	—	44	—	—	—	"My Hero"
"Darling Nikki"	2003	15	—	—	—	—	—	—	—	—	—	"Have it All"
"Miracle"	2006	—	—	—	—	—	29	—	—	—	—	In Your Honor
"Keep the Car Running"	2008	—	—	—	—	96	—	—	—	—	—	"Let It Die"
"Summer's End"	2008	—	—	—	—	—	—	—	—	—	—	Echoes, Silence, Patience & Grace
"Word Forward"	2010	—	—	—	—	—	11	—	—	109	5	Greatest Hits
"White Limo"	2011	—	—	—	—	—	—	—	—	—	29	Wasting Light
"Back & Forth"	2012	—	—	—	24	—	—	—	—	—	—	Wasting Light
"The Feast and the Famine"	2014	—	— (Note: "The Feast and the Famine" did not enter the Mainstream Rock Airplay chart, but peaked at number four on the Hard Rock Digital Song Sales chart.)	37	16	—	—	—	93	164	4	Sonic Highways
"What Did I Do? / God as My Witness"	2014	—	— (Note: "What Did I Do? / God as My Witness" did not enter the Mainstream Rock Airplay chart, but peaked at number 11 on the Hard Rock Digital Song Sales chart.)	37	—	—	—	—	—	165	6	Sonic Highways
"Run Rudolph Run"	2020	—	—	—	—	—	42	—	—	—	—	Amazon Music Holiday Plays
"Show Me How"	2023	—	— (Note: "Show Me How" did not enter the Mainstream Rock Airplay chart, but peaked at number 21 on the Hot Hard Rock Songs chart.)	—	—	—	—	—	—	—	17	But Here We Are
"The Teacher"	2023	—	—	—	—	—	—	—	—	—	32	But Here We Are
"—" denotes a recording that did not chart or was not released in that territory.

== Other charted songs ==
Title	Year	Peak chart positions										Album
Title	Year	US Hard Rock	CAN Rock	CZ Rock	FIN Air.	MEX Air.	NZ Hot	POL	SWE Heat.	UK	UK Rock	Album
"My Hero" (Live)	2006	—	42	—	—	—	—	—	—	—	—	Skin and Bones
"Everlong" (Acoustic Version)	2009	— (Note: "Everlong" (Acoustic Version) did not enter the Hot Hard Rock Songs chart, but peaked at number 20 on the Alternative Digital Songs chart.)	—	—	—	—	—	—	—	—	—	Greatest Hits
"Better Off"	2011	—	—	—	—	—	—	—	—	—	5	Wasting Light
"Fortunate Son" (with John Fogerty)	2013	—	—	10	—	—	—	—	—	—	—	Wrote a Song for Everyone
"In the Clear"	2014	—	—	—	—	—	—	24	—	—	11	Sonic Highways
"I Am a River"	2014	—	—	—	61	50	—	25	—	—	15	Sonic Highways
"Subterranean"	2014	—	—	—	—	—	—	—	—	—	18	Sonic Highways
"Savior Breath"	2015	—	—	—	—	35	—	—	—	—	—	Saint Cecilia (EP)
"T-Shirt"	2017	—	—	—	—	—	—	—	—	94	3	Concrete and Gold
"Make It Right"	2017	—	—	—	—	—	6	—	—	—	9	Concrete and Gold
"La Dee Da"	2017	—	—	—	—	—	—	32	—	—	4	Concrete and Gold
"Arrows"	2017	—	—	—	—	—	—	—	16	—	5	Concrete and Gold
"Dirty Water"	2017	—	—	—	—	—	—	—	—	—	6	Concrete and Gold
"Happy Ever After (Zero Hour)"	2017	—	—	—	—	—	—	—	—	—	10	Concrete and Gold
"Sunday Rain"	2017	—	—	—	—	—	—	—	—	—	11	Concrete and Gold
"Concrete and Gold"	2017	—	—	—	—	—	—	—	—	—	16	Concrete and Gold
"Cloudspotter"	2021	9	—	—	—	—	13	—	—	—	—	Medicine at Midnight
"Medicine at Midnight"	2021	12	—	—	—	—	—	—	—	—	—	Medicine at Midnight
"Holding Poison"	2021	19	—	—	—	—	—	—	—	—	13	Medicine at Midnight
"Chasing Birds"	2021	—	—	—	—	—	—	—	—	—	19	Medicine at Midnight
"Hearing Voices"	2023	22	—	—	—	—	21	—	—	—	15	But Here We Are
"But Here We Are"	2023	23	—	—	—	—	—	—	—	—	19	But Here We Are
"Nothing at All"	2023	25	—	—	—	—	—	—	—	—	22	But Here We Are
"Beyond Me"	2023	—	—	—	—	—	—	—	—	—	33	But Here We Are
"—" denotes a recording that did not chart or was not released in that territory.

== Video albums ==
Video	Peak chart positions					Certifications
Video	US	AUS	FIN	NOR	UK	Certifications
Everywhere but Home: Released: November 25, 2003; Label: Roswell/RCA (#566509); Format: DVD, UMD	23	1	—	8	13	RIAA: Gold; ARIA: 3× Platinum; BPI: Platinum
Skin and Bones: Released: November 7, 2006; Label: RCA (#88697024519); Format: DVD	7	4	—	3	—	ARIA: 2× Platinum
Skin and Bones & Live in Hyde Park: Released: November 7, 2006; Label: RCA (#88697032399); Format: DVD	—	14	—	1	5	ARIA: 4× Platinum; BPI: Platinum
Live at Wembley Stadium: Released: August 25, 2008; Label: RCA (#377594); Format: DVD, Blu-ray	3	2	3	7	1	ARIA: 3× Platinum; RMNZ: Gold; BPI: Platinum
Foo Fighters: Back and Forth: Released: June 2011; Label: Columbia Records; Format: DVD, Blu-ray	1	1	1	1	1	RIAA: Gold; ARIA: 2× Platinum
Foo Fighters: Sonic Highways: Released: October 6, 2014; Label: Roswell Films, LLC; Format: Digital download, DVD, Blu-ray	1	1	2	—	1	ARIA: Gold
"—" denotes videos that did not chart.

== Music videos ==
Year	Song	Director(s)
1995	"I'll Stick Around"	Gerald Casale
1996	"Big Me"	Jesse Peretz
1997	"Monkey Wrench"	Dave Grohl
1997	"Everlong"	Michel Gondry
1998	"My Hero"	Dave Grohl
1998	"Walking After You"	Matthew Rolston
1999	"Learn to Fly"	Jesse Peretz
2000	"Generator"	Jon Olb
2000	"Breakout"	The Malloys
2000	"Next Year"	Phil Harder
2002	"The One"	Jesse Peretz
2002	"All My Life"	Dave Grohl
2002	"Walking a Line"	Jordyn Blum and Chris Osterhus
2002	"Times Like These" (early version)	Liam Lynch
2002	"Times Like These"	Marc Klasfeld
2002	"Times Like These" (acoustic version)	Dave Grohl and Bill Yukich
2003	"Low"	Jesse Peretz
2005	"Best of You"	Mark Pellington
2005	"DOA"	Mike Palmieri
2005	"Resolve"	Mike Palmieri
2006	"No Way Back"	Nick Wickham
2007	"The Pretender"	Sam Brown
2007	"Long Road to Ruin"	Jesse Peretz
2008	"Long Road to Ruin (Davy Grolton Version)"	Jesse Peretz
2009	"Wheels"	Sam Brown
2011	"White Limo"	Dave Grohl
2011	"Rope"	Dave Grohl
2011	"Bridge Burning" (Contest Winner Version*)	Will Doyle & Richard Peete
2011	"Rope" (Contest Winner Version*)	Djay Brawner
2011	"Dear Rosemary" (Contest Winner Version*)	Karl Richter
2011	"White Limo" (Contest Winner Version*)	Randy Scott Slavin
2011	"Arlandria" (Contest Winner Version*)	Nicholas Spaventa
2011	"These Days" (Contest Winner Version*)	Jay Hollinsworth
2011	"Back & Forth" (Contest Winner Version*)	Justin Staggs
2011	"A Matter of Time" (Contest Winner Version*)	Genie Wiggins
2011	"Miss the Misery" (Contest Winner Version*)	Pete Levin
2011	"I Should Have Known" (Contest Winner Version*)	Daniel Fickle
2011	"Walk" (Contest Winner Version*)	Phil Hodges
2011	"Walk"	Sam Jones
2011	"Hot Buns"	Dave Grohl
2011	"Arlandria"	Nick Wickham
2012	"These Days"	Wayne Isham
2014	"Something from Nothing"	Dave Grohl
2014	"The Feast and the Famine"	Dave Grohl
2014	"Congregation"	Dave Grohl
2014	"What Did I Do? / God as My Witness"	Dave Grohl
2014	"Outside"	Dave Grohl
2014	"In The Clear"	Dave Grohl
2014	"Subterranean"	Dave Grohl
2014	"I Am a River"	Dave Grohl
2017	"Run"	Dave Grohl
2017	"The Sky Is a Neighborhood"	Dave Grohl
2020	"Shame Shame"	Paola Kudacki
2021	"Waiting on a War"	Paola Kudacki
2021	"No Son of Mine"	Danny Clinch & Emlyn Davies
2021	"Chasing Birds"	Emlyn Davies
2021	"Love Dies Young"	Dave Grohl
2023	"Show Me How"	Tim Kellner
2023	"The Teacher"	Tony Oursler
2023	"The Glass"	Tim Kellner
2026	"Window"	Jake Erland
2026	"Spit Shine"	Dave Grohl
2026	"Of All People"	Alex Acy
* "Contest Winner Version" videos were commissioned and paid for by Foo Fighters and RCA Records. Directors were picked from a national contest.

== Other appearances ==
Year	Song	Album
1995	"I'll Stick Around"	A Flavour of the Label 4
1995	"This is a Call"	MTV Fresh
1996	"Alone+Easy Target"	Big Shiny Tunes
1996	"This Is a Call"	Triple J Hottest 100 Volume 3
1996	"Down in the Park"	Songs in the Key of X: Music From and Inspired by The X-Files
1997	"Drive Me Wild"	Sound as a Pound
1997	"Wind Up"	Melody Maker Planet Rock
1997	"This Is a Call" (live)	Tibetan Freedom Concert
1997	"Dear Lover"	Scream 2: Music From The Dimension Motion Picture
1998	"New Way Home"	Dr. Martens/Capitol Records Music Sampler
1998	"Baker Street"	Come Again / Essential Interpretations
1998	"A320"	Godzilla Soundtrack
1998	"Walking After You"	The X-Files: The Album
1998	"Friend of a Friend" (live)	Melody Maker: Steve Lamacq's Bootleg Session
1998	"My Hero"	Big Shiny Tunes 3
1998	"Monkey Wrench"	Triple J Hottest 100, Volume 5
1999	"My Hero"	Varsity Blues Soundtrack
1999	"I'll Stick Around"	MTV: The First 1000 Years: Rock
2000	"Have a Cigar" (with Brian May)	Music from and Inspired by Mission: Impossible II
2000	"Breakout"	Me, Myself & Irene Soundtrack
2000	"Everlong" (live)	Cold: Live at the Chapel
2000	"My Hero" (Worcester Firefighters Tribute mix)	WAAF Survive This!
2000	"My Hero" (live)	Live X6 Walk Unafraid
2000	"Monkey Wrench" (live)	Q101 Live Volume 2
2000	"Learn to Fly"	Triple J Hottest 100, Volume 7
2001	"Generator"	Triple J Hottest 100, Volume 8
2001	"Win or Lose"	Music from the Motion Picture Out Cold
2001	"The One"	Orange County: The Soundtrack
2002	"Generator"	Discrespective
2002	"The One"	Big Day Out 03
2003	"All My Life"	Triple J Hottest 100, Volume 10
2003	"Times Like These"	American Wedding: Music From the Motion Picture
2004	"Gas Chamber"	Rock Against Bush, Vol. 2
2004	"Learn to Fly"	Committed 2 Rock
2005	"All My Life"	Later with Jools Holland: World
2006	"DOA" (live)	Radio 1's Live Lounge
2006	"Best of You"	Grammy Nominees 2006
2006	"DOA"	triple j – Hottest 100: Vol 13
2007	"Danny Says"	CBGB Forever
2007	"Band on the Run"	Radio 1 Established 1967
2007	"Razor"	Catch and Release soundtrack
2007	"Times Like These" (live)	Radio 1's Live Lounge – Volume 2
2007	"Times Like These" (live)	Live Earth: The Concerts for a Climate in Crisis
2008	"The Pretender"	Triple J Hottest 100 Volume 15
2010	"Virginia Moon" (featuring Norah Jones)	...Featuring
2011	"My Hero"	Songs for Japan
2011	"Times Like These"	The Best of BBC Radio 1's Live Lounge
2011	"Walk"	Thor soundtrack (Note: "Walk" plays during the film, but is not featured on the Thor soundtrack album.)
2011	"Miss the Misery"	Real Steel soundtrack
2011	"Requiem (BBC live version)"	Absolute Respect
2013	"Fortunate Son"	Wrote a Song for Everyone
2017	"Soldier"	7-Inches for Planned Parenthood

== See also ==
- Dave Grohl discography
- List of songs recorded by Foo Fighters
- Nirvana discography
