= Dave Grohl discography =

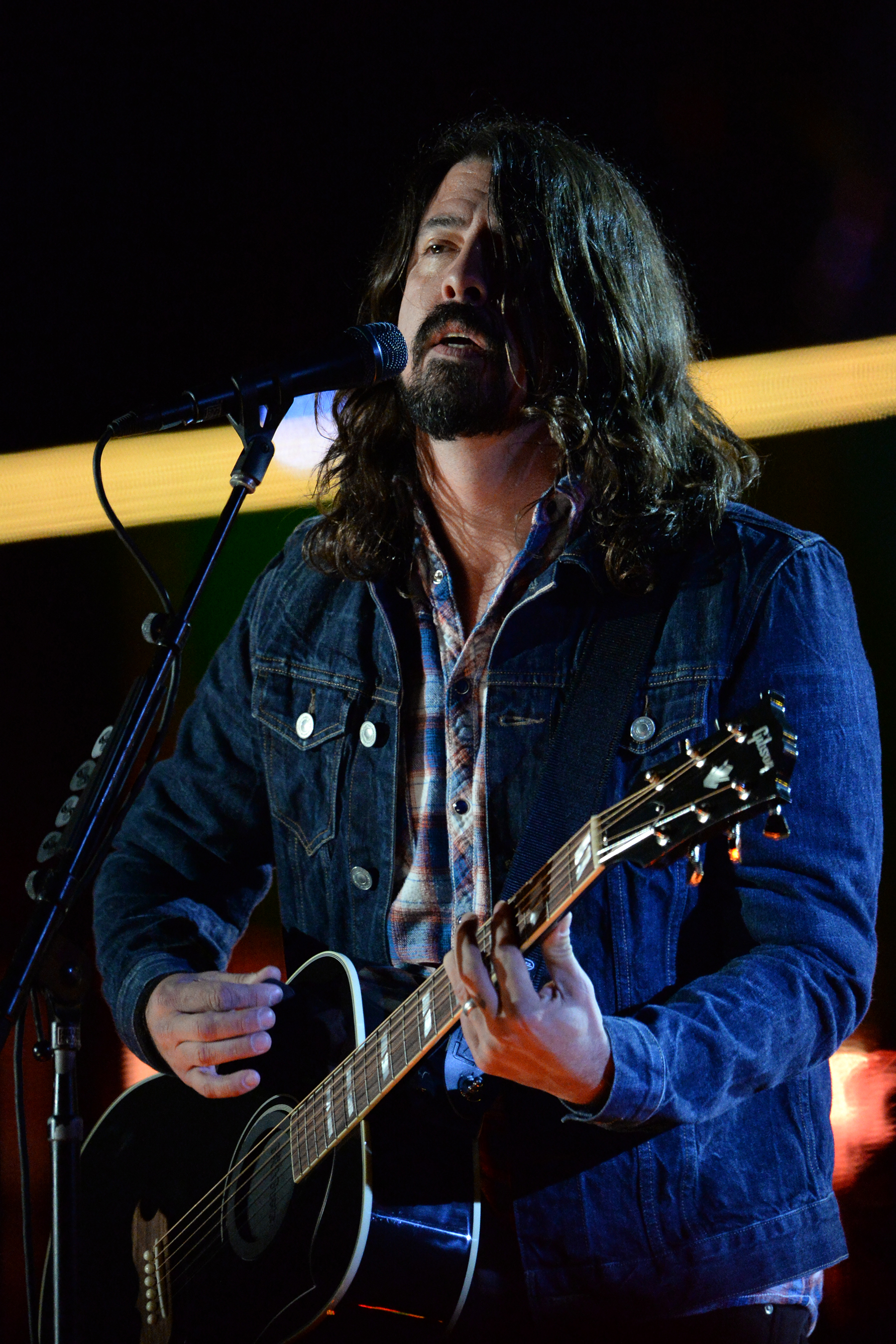
- Grohl performing in 2014
- Studio albums: 16
- Extended plays: 6
- Soundtrack albums: 4
- Live albums: 6
- Compilation albums: 8
- Singles: 64
- Video albums: 11
- Collaborations: 26

Dave Grohl is an American singer, songwriter, and musician whose discography consists of 16 studio albums, six live albums, eight compilation albums, six EPs, and four soundtracks, and also includes his other collaborations and work as a studio musician with 26 additional artists. A large portion of his releases have come as the drummer of Nirvana (1990–1994) and as the frontman of Foo Fighters (1995–present).

Grohl began playing music in the 1980s and was a member of Freak Baby, whose name was later changed to Mission Impossible after Grohl switched from guitarist to drummer. The band recorded demos under both names and released a split EP with Lünch Meat, originally issued as Thanks (1986), later retitled Getting Shit for Growing Up Different. After some lineup changes, Mission Impossible became Dain Bramage and released I Scream Not Coming Down (1986) before breaking up when Grohl auditioned for Scream and became the band's drummer.

With Scream, Grohl released No More Censorship (1988), two live albums and the posthumous release, Fumble (1993), recorded shortly before the group's dissolution in 1990. Later that year, Grohl was put in contact with Kurt Cobain and Krist Novoselic who were in search of a new drummer for their band Nirvana. After a successful tryout, Grohl joined the band and recorded Nevermind (1991) with them the following year. The album became a breakthrough achievement and to date has sold over 30 million copies worldwide. In Utero (1993), their third and final studio album, was released just months prior to the death of Cobain. Since then, a multitude of posthumous releases featuring Grohl have been issued, including MTV Unplugged in New York (1994), From the Muddy Banks of the Wishkah (1996), With the Lights Out (2004), and Live at Reading (2009).

Throughout his tenure with Scream and Nirvana, Grohl worked on crafting material of his own. Using the pseudonym Late!, Grohl released the album Pocketwatch (1992), on which he performed all instruments and vocals. This recording method was adopted three years later with Foo Fighters (1995), another album performed entirely by Grohl. After acquiring band members to help support the release, Foo Fighters quickly transformed into a group fronted by Grohl. The band has gone on to release a total of ten studio albums and three EPs to date, in addition to the live album Skin and Bones (2006) and their career spanning Greatest Hits (2009). As of 2015, Foo Fighters have sold over 12 million albums in the U.S.

Grohl appeared as drummer of The Backbeat Band, who recorded music for the film Backbeat (1994). Although recorded in 1990, Harlingtox A.D. would mark Grohl's only appearance as a bassist, with the release of Harlingtox Angel Divine (1996). He appeared for the first time as David Grohl, credited for the music to the film Touch (1997), which also included the resurrection of his former moniker Late! on select tracks. In 2000, Grohl began work on the heavy metal side project Probot (2004), writing and performing the majority of the music himself.

While remaining active with Foo Fighters, Grohl has also contributed to an assortment of releases by other artists, ranging from solo acts such as Tony Iommi, David Bowie, Slash, and Michael Jackson to rock groups including Tenacious D, Queens of the Stone Age, Killing Joke, and Nine Inch Nails, among many others (see also: collaborations). Grohl contributed the track "Vile" to the soundtrack of the documentary film Rising Sun: The Legend of Skateboarder Christian Hosoi (2006). In 2009, along with Josh Homme and John Paul Jones, he co-founded the supergroup Them Crooked Vultures for which he plays drums. The band released one self-titled studio album.

== Releases ==
=== with Freak Baby ===
- Can It Be? (1985), MetroZine – "20/20 Hindsight", "No Words", "Different"

=== with Mission Impossible ===
- Alive & Kicking (1985), WGNS Recordings – "I Can Only Try"
- 77 KK (1985), 77 KK Records – "Life Already Drawn"
- Getting Shit for Growing Up Different (1986), Dischord Records/Sammich Records

=== with Dain Bramage ===
- Demo 1 (1986), No Label
- Demo 2 (1986), No Label
- I Scream Not Coming Down (1986), Fartblossom Enterprizes

=== with Scream ===
- No More Censorship (1988), RAS Records
- Live at Van Hall in Amsterdam (1988), Konkurrel Records
- Your Choice Live Series Vol.10 (1990), Your Choice Records
- Fumble (Recorded 1989 / Released 1993), Dischord Records

=== with Nirvana ===
- Nevermind (1991), DGC
- Hormoaning (1992), DGC/Geffen
- Incesticide (1992), Sub Pop/DGC
- In Utero (1993), DGC/Geffen
- MTV Unplugged in New York (1994), DGC/Geffen
- Singles (1996), DGC/Geffen
- From the Muddy Banks of the Wishkah (1996), DGC/Geffen
- Nirvana (2002), DGC/Geffen
- With the Lights Out (2004), DGC/Geffen/Universal
- Sliver: The Best of the Box (2005), DGC/Geffen/Universal
- Live at Reading (2009), Geffen
- Icon (2010), Universal

=== with Late! ===
- Pocketwatch (1992), Simple Machines
- Touch Motion Picture soundtrack (on select tracks)

=== with Foo Fighters ===
- Foo Fighters (1995), Roswell/Capitol
- The Colour and the Shape (1997), Roswell/Capitol
- There Is Nothing Left to Lose (1999), RCA
- One by One (2002), RCA
- In Your Honor (2005), RCA
- Five Songs and a Cover (2005), RCA
- Skin and Bones (2006), RCA
- Echoes, Silence, Patience & Grace (2007), RCA
- Greatest Hits (2009), RCA
- Wasting Light (2011), RCA
- Medium Rare (2011), Roswell/RCA
- Sonic Highways (2014), RCA
- Concrete and Gold (2017), RCA
- Medicine at Midnight (2021), RCA
- But Here We Are (2023), RCA
- Your Favorite Toy (2026), RCA

=== with Harlingtox A.D. ===
- Harlingtox Angel Divine (1996), Laundry Room Records

=== with Tenacious D ===
- Tenacious D (2001), Epic Records
- Pick of Destiny (2006), Epic Records
- Rize of the Fenix (2012), Columbia Records
- Post-Apocalypto (2018), Columbia Records

=== with Queens of the Stone Age ===
- Songs for the Deaf (2002), Interscope Records
- ...Like Clockwork (2013), Matador Records

=== with Probot ===
- Probot (2004), Southern Lord/Roswell

=== with Them Crooked Vultures ===
- Them Crooked Vultures (2009), DGC/Interscope

=== with Dee Gees ===
- Hail Satin (2021), RCA

=== with Dream Widow ===
- Dream Widow (2022), Roswell Records

=== Solo career ===
- Play (2018)

== Soundtracks ==
=== With The Backbeat Band ===
- Backbeat Music from the Motion Picture (1994), Virgin Records

=== With Tenacious D ===
- The Pick of Destiny Soundtrack to the film Tenacious D in The Pick of Destiny (2006), Epic Records

=== As David/Dave Grohl ===
- Touch Music from the Motion Picture (1997), Roswell/Capitol
- Rising Sun: The Legend of Skateboarder Christian Hosoi Soundtrack (2006), Image Entertainment
- Sound City: Real to Reel Soundtrack (2013), Variance Films/Roswell Films/Gravitas Ventures
- A Minecraft Movie Soundtrack (2025), WaterTower Music

== Collaborations ==
The following is a list of artists whose releases feature contributions from Dave Grohl.

Year	Artist	Release	Additional information
1992	King Buzzo	King Buzzo	Guitar, bass, and drums on select tracks, lead vocals on "Skeeter".
1995	Tom Petty and the Heartbreakers	SNL25: The Musical Performances Volume 1	Drums on "Honey Bee", recorded November 19, 1994 for Saturday Night Live.
1995	Mike Watt	Ball-Hog or Tugboat?	Guitar on "Big Train", drums on "Big Train" and "Against the 70's", which both feature Eddie Vedder.
1995	The Stinky Puffs	A Little Tiny Smelly Bit of The Stinky Puffs	Drums on the live versions of "Buddies Aren't Butts", "Menendez' Killed Their Parents", "I'll Love You Anyway" and "I Am Gross/No You're Not!", which also feature Krist Novoselic.
1997	Puff Daddy	Been Around the World	Drums on "It's All About the Benjamins (Rock Remix I)" and "It's All About the Benjamins (Rock Remix II)", which both feature The Notorious B.I.G., Lil' Kim, Tommy Stinson and Rob Zombie.
1998	Earthlings?	Earthlings?	Guitar and backing vocals on "The Dreaded Lovelies", which also features Victoria Williams. Guitar on "Yugga Yugga", a bonus track on the 2012 vinyl reissue.
2000	Reeves Gabrels	Ulysses (Della Notte)	Drums and backing vocals on "Jewel", which also features Frank Black and David Bowie.
2000	MxPx	The Ever Passing Moment	Count-off vocal introduction on "The Next Big Thing".
2000	Earthlings?	Human Beans	Drums on "Rock Dove", which also features Mark Lanegan and Barrett Martin.
2000	Tony Iommi	Iommi	Lead vocals and drums on "Goodbye Lament", which also features Brian May.
2001	Tenacious D	Tenacious D	Drums on all tracks, additional guitar on "Wonderboy", "Explosivo", "Dio", "The Road", "Rock Your Socks", "Double Team" and "City Hall".
2002	David Bowie	Heathen	Guitar on "I've Been Waiting for You".
2002	Queens of the Stone Age	Songs for the Deaf	Drums and percussion on all tracks
2003	Cat Power	You Are Free	Bass on "Speak for Me", drums on "Speak for Me", "He-War" and "Shaking Paper".
2003	Killing Joke	Killing Joke	Drums on all tracks.
2003	The Bangles	Doll Revolution	Backing vocals on select tracks.
2005	Garbage	Bleed Like Me	Drums on "Bad Boyfriend".
2005	Nine Inch Nails	With Teeth	Percussion on "All the Love in the World", drums on "You Know What You Are?", "The Collector", "Every Day Is Exactly the Same", "Getting Smaller", "Sunspots" and "The Line Begins to Blur".
2006	Pete Yorn	Nightcrawler	Drums on "For Us".
2006	Tenacious D	The Pick of Destiny	Drums on all tracks, demon vocals on "Beelzeboss (The Final Showdown)".
2006	Juliette and the Licks	Four on the Floor	Drums and percussion on all tracks.
2008	Jackson United	Harmony and Dissidence	Drums on "Undertow", "Black Regrets", "Lifeboat", "Trigger Happy", "White Flag Burning", "Stitching" and "Like a Bomb".
2008	Lemmy Kilmister	We Wish You a Metal Xmas and a Headbanging New Year	Drums on "Run Rudolph Run", which also features Billy Gibbons.
2009	The Prodigy	Invaders Must Die	Drums on "Run with the Wolves", additional drums on "Stand Up".
2010	Slash	Slash	Drums on "Watch This", which also features Duff McKagan.
2010	Taylor Hawkins and the Coattail Riders	Red Light Fever	Guitar and backing vocals on select tracks.
2010	Mondo Generator	Dog Food	Drums on "Dog Food", which also features Happy-Tom.
2012	Tenacious D	Rize of the Fenix	Drums on all tracks except "They Fucked Our Asses" or "They F----d Our A---s"
2013	Ghost	If You Have Ghost	Rhythm guitar on "If You Have Ghosts", drums on "I'm a Marionette" and "Waiting for the Night", production
2013	RDGLDGRN	RDGLDGRN EP	Drums
2013	Zac Brown Band	The Grohl Sessions, Vol. 1	Drums on "Let It Rain" and "Day for the Dead", producer
2014	The Birds of Satan	The Birds of Satan	Guitar on select tracks. Drums on digital only single "Be The Bird".
2014	Kristeen Young	The Knife Shift	Drums on all tracks except "Then I Screamed", guitar on 5 tracks
2015	Blast	For Those Who've Graced the Fire	Drums
2015	Dan Mangan + Blacksmith	Club Meds	Backing vocals and slide guitar on "Vessel"
2016	Nine Inch Nails	Not the Actual Events	Drums on "The Idea of You"
2016	Rush	2112 (40th Anniversary)	"Overture"
2020	The Bird and the Bee	Put Up The Lights	Drums on "Little Drummer Boy"
2021	Halsey	If I Can't Have Love, I Want Power	Drums on "Honey"
2022	Liam Gallagher	C'mon You Know	Drums on "Everything's Electric"
2024	St. Vincent	All Born Screaming	Drums on "Broken Man" and "Flea"
2025	Jack Black	A Minecraft Movie soundtrack	Drums on "I Feel Alive"
2025	Ed Sheeran	F1 the Album	Drums on "Drive"

== Singles ==
The following is a list of singles that include Dave Grohl as an official band member.

With Scream

- "Mardi Gras"/"Land Torn Down" (1990)

With Nirvana

- "Smells Like Teen Spirit" (1991)
- "Come as You Are" (1992)
- "On a Plain" (1992) promotional single
- "Lithium" (1992)
- "In Bloom" (1992)
- "Molly's Lips" (1992) promotional single
- "Puss"/"Oh, the Guilt" (1993) split single w/ The Jesus Lizard
- "Heart-Shaped Box" (1993) see also: "Marigold"
- "All Apologies"/"Rape Me" (1993)
- "Pennyroyal Tea" (1994) discontinued
- "About a Girl" (1994)
- "The Man Who Sold the World" (1994) promotional single
- "Where Did You Sleep Last Night" (1994) promotional single
- "Lake of Fire" (1994) promotional single
- "Aneurysm" (1996) promotional single
- "Drain You" (1996) promotional single
- "You Know You're Right" (2002)

With The Backbeat Band

- "Money" (1994)
- "Please Mr. Postman" (1994)

With Foo Fighters

- "Exhausted" (1995) promotional single
- "This Is a Call" (1995)
- "I'll Stick Around" (1995)
- "For All the Cows" (1995)
- "Big Me" (1996)
- "Alone+Easy Target" (1996) promotional single
- "Monkey Wrench" (1997)
- "Everlong" (1997)
- "My Hero" (1998)
- "Walking After You" (1998)
- "Baker Street" (1998) promotional single
- "Learn to Fly" (1999)
- "Stacked Actors" (2000)
- "Generator" (2000)
- "Breakout" (2000)
- "Next Year" (2000)
- "The One" (2002)
- "All My Life" (2002)
- "Times Like These" (2003)
- "Low" (2003)
- "Have It All" (2003)
- "Darling Nikki" (2003) promotional single
- "Best of You" (2005)
- "DOA" (2005)
- "Resolve" (2005)
- "No Way Back/Cold Day in the Sun" (2006)
- "Miracle" (2006) promotional single
- "Virginia Moon" (2006) promotional single

With Foo Fighters (continued)

- "The Pretender" (2007)
- "Long Road to Ruin" (2007)
- "Cheer Up Boys (Your Make Up Is Running)" (2008)
- "Let It Die" (2008)
- "Keep the Car Running" (2008) promotional single
- "Summer's End" (2008) promotional single
- "Wheels" (2009)
- "Word Forward" (2010) promotional single
- "Rope" (2011)
- "White Limo" (2011) promotional single
- "Walk" (2011)
- "Arlandria" (2011)
- "These Days" (2011)
- "Bridge Burning" (2012)
- "Something from Nothing (2014)
- "The Feast and the Famine" (2014)
- "Congregation" (2014)
- "What Did I Do? / God As My Witness" (2014)
- "Outside" (2015)
- "Saint Cecilia" (2015)
- "Run" (2017)
- "The Sky Is a Neighborhood" (2017)
- "The Line" (2018)
- "Shame Shame" (2020)
- "No Son of Mine" (2020)
- "Waiting on a War" (2021)
- "Making a Fire" (2021)
- "Rescued" (2023)
- "Under You" (2023)
- "Show Me How" (2023)
- "The Teacher" (2023)

With Queens of the Stone Age

- "No One Knows" (2002)
- "Go with the Flow" (2003)
- "First It Giveth" (2003)
- "My God Is the Sun" (2013)

As Probot

- "Centuries of Sin"/"The Emerald Law" (2003)

With Them Crooked Vultures

- "New Fang" (2009)
- "Mind Eraser, No Chaser" (2009)

With BBC Music (various artists)

- "God Only Knows" (charity single) (2014)

Solo

- "Play" (2018)

With Live Lounge Allstars

- "Times Like These" (charity single) (2020)

With Liam Gallagher

- "Everything's Electric" (co-wrote and plays drums) (2022)

== Production ==
The following releases were produced or co-produced by Dave Grohl.

Year	Release	Artist(s)
1992	King Buzzo^{[I]}	King Buzzo
1995	Foo Fighters^{[II]}	Foo Fighters
1997	Touch OST	David Grohl/Late! Louise Post; John Doe
1999	Into the Pink	Verbena
2006	Chariots on Fire EP	Rye Coalition
2006	Curses	Rye Coalition
2013	If You Have Ghost	Ghost
2013	The Grohl Sessions, Vol. 1	Zac Brown Band

- I Co-produced by Dave Grohl and Buzz Osborne.
- II Co-produced by Dave Grohl and Barrett Jones.

== Videography ==
=== With Nirvana ===
- Live! Tonight! Sold Out!! (1994) DGC
- Classic Albums: Nirvana – Nevermind (2005) Eagle Vision
- MTV Unplugged in New York (2007) DGC
- Live at Reading (2009) Geffen
- Live at the Paramount (2011) DGC
- Live and Loud (2013) DGC

=== With Foo Fighters ===
- Everywhere but Home (2003) Roswell/RCA
- Skin and Bones (2006) RCA
- Skin and Bones & Live in Hyde Park (2006) RCA
- Live at Wembley Stadium (2008) RCA
- Foo Fighters: Back and Forth (2011) RCA
- Foo Fighters: Sonic Highways (2014) RCA

=== As David/Dave Grohl ===
- Sound City (2013) Variance Films/Roswell Films/Gravitas Ventures
