= Skin and Bones (Foo Fighters album) =

Live album by Foo Fighters
- Released: November 7, 2006
- Recorded: August 29–31, 2006
- Venue: Pantages Theatre (Los Angeles)
- Genre: Alternative rock; acoustic rock
- Length: 78:37
- Label: RCA

Foo Fighters chronology
Five Songs and a Cover (2005)	Skin and Bones (2006)	Echoes, Silence, Patience & Grace (2007)

Foo Fighters video chronology
Everywhere but Home (2003)	Skin and Bones (2006)	Live at Wembley Stadium (2008)

Professional ratings
Review scores
Source	Rating
AllMusic	3/5 stars
The A.V. Club	B
Encyclopedia of Popular Music	3/5 stars
Entertainment Weekly	B+
Melodic	4.5/5 stars
NME	7/10
Now	4/5 stars
Pitchfork	3.8/10
Popmatters	8/10 stars
Rolling Stone	3/5 stars

Skin and Bones is a live acoustic album by Foo Fighters released on November 7, 2006.

== Background ==
The 15-track set was recorded on August 29, 30 and 31, 2006 at the Pantages Theatre in Los Angeles and spotlights an expanded eight-piece lineup featuring violinist/singer Petra Haden, former Germs/Nirvana/Foo Fighters guitarist Pat Smear, Wallflowers and future Foo Fighters keyboardist Rami Jaffee, and percussionist Drew Hester. Haden and Jaffee had appeared as guest musicians on the band's previous studio album, In Your Honor. A three-song encore consists of Grohl's solo performances of "Friend of a Friend", "Best of You", and "Everlong". The album debuted at number 21 on the Billboard 200, selling about 49,000 copies in its first week. This was also the album's peak position on the chart.

A DVD of the original shows, featuring a total of 21 songs, was released on November 28, 2006. It was directed by Danny Clinch, who appears briefly on-stage to play harmonica on the song "Another Round", reprising the contribution he made to the original album recording of the song for In Your Honor. The UK version of the release is a two-disc set including the band's 2006 (electric) performance at Hyde Park.

The studio version of the title song was previously released as a B-side on the single "DOA", and was included on the EP Five Songs and a Cover.

== Track listing ==
=== CD ===
No.	Title	Writer(s)	Length
1.	"Razor"	Dave Grohl	6:48
2.	"Over and Out"	Grohl, Taylor Hawkins, Nate Mendel, Chris Shiflett	5:56
3.	"Walking After You"	Grohl	5:18
4.	"Marigold"	Grohl	3:19
5.	"My Hero"	Grohl, Pat Smear, Mendel	4:51
6.	"Next Year"	Grohl, Hawkins, Mendel	4:34
7.	"Another Round"	Grohl, Hawkins, Mendel, Shiflett	4:55
8.	"Big Me"	Grohl	3:01
9.	"Cold Day in the Sun"	Hawkins	3:26
10.	"Skin and Bones"	Grohl	4:00
11.	"February Stars"	Grohl, Smear, Mendel	5:51
12.	"Times Like These"	Grohl, Hawkins, Mendel, Shiflett	5:25
13.	"Friend of a Friend"	Grohl	4:01
14.	"Best of You"	Grohl, Hawkins, Mendel, Shiflett	5:02
15.	"Everlong"	Grohl	6:37

iTunes bonus tracks & videos
No.	Title	Writer(s)	Length
16.	"Ain't It the Life" (iTunes bonus song)	Grohl, Hawkins, Mendel	4:42
17.	"Video - Skin and Bones" (iTunes bonus with album pre-order)

=== DVD ===
==== Live in Los Angeles (USA) ====
No.	Title	Writer(s)	Length
1.	"Intro"	Dave Grohl	6:05
2.	"Razor"	Grohl	5:55
3.	"Over and Out"	Grohl, Taylor Hawkins, Nate Mendel, Chris Shiflett	8:05
4.	"On the Mend"	Grohl, Hawkins, Mendel, Shiflett	4:45
5.	"Walking After You"	Grohl	4:20
6.	"Still"	Grohl, Hawkins, Mendel, Shiflett	5:44
7.	"Marigold"	Grohl	3:28
8.	"My Hero"	Grohl, Pat Smear, Mendel	6:14
9.	"Next Year"	Grohl, Hawkins, Mendel	4:43
10.	"Another Round"	Grohl, Hawkins, Mendel, Shiflett	5:30
11.	"See You"	Grohl, Smear, Mendel	11:51
12.	"Cold Day in the Sun"	Hawkins	5:08
13.	"Big Me"	Grohl	2:51
14.	"What If I Do?"	Grohl, Hawkins, Mendel, Shiflett	8:36
15.	"Skin and Bones"	Grohl, Hawkins, Mendel, Shiflett	4:08
16.	"Ain't It the Life"	Grohl, Hawkins, Mendel	4:39
17.	"February Stars"	Grohl, Smear, Mendel	5:51
18.	"Times Like These"	Grohl, Hawkins, Mendel, Shiflett	14:50
19.	"Friend of a Friend"	Grohl	3:48
20.	"Best of You"	Grohl, Hawkins, Mendel, Shiflett	5:59
21.	"Everlong"	Grohl	9:10

==== Live in Hyde Park (UK) ====
No.	Title	Writer(s)	Length
1.	"In Your Honor"	Dave Grohl, Taylor Hawkins, Nate Mendel, Chris Shiflett
2.	"All My Life"	Grohl, Hawkins, Mendel, Shiflett
3.	"Best of You"	Grohl, Hawkins, Mendel, Shiflett
4.	"Times Like These"	Grohl, Hawkins, Mendel, Shiflett
5.	"Learn to Fly"	Grohl, Hawkins, Mendel
6.	"Breakout"	Grohl, Hawkins, Mendel
7.	"Shake Your Blood" (feat. Lemmy of Motörhead)	Grohl, Lemmy
8.	"Stacked Actors"	Grohl, Hawkins, Mendel
9.	"My Hero"	Grohl, Pat Smear, Mendel
10.	"Generator"	Grohl, Hawkins, Mendel
11.	"DOA"	Grohl, Hawkins, Mendel, Shiflett
12.	"Monkey Wrench"	Grohl, Smear, Mendel
13.	"Tie Your Mother Down" (feat. Brian May and Roger Taylor of Queen)	May
14.	"Everlong"	Grohl

Note: The whole setlist is not included on the DVD. The song "The One" is excluded, as Taylor Hawkins made a mistake on the drums; mobile phone footage is available on YouTube. "No Way Back" and "This Is a Call" were on the setlist, but were not played due to strict Royal Park regulations.

== Personnel ==
Foo Fighters

- Dave Grohl – lead vocals, guitar, backing vocals on "Cold Day in the Sun"
- Taylor Hawkins – drums, percussion, backing vocals, lead vocals on "Cold Day in the Sun"
- Nate Mendel – bass guitar
- Chris Shiflett – guitar

Additional personnel

- Petra Haden – violin, mandolin, backing vocals
- Drew Hester – percussion and vibes
- Rami Jaffee – piano, Mellotron, accordion, organ
- Pat Smear – acoustic and electric guitar
- Danny Clinch – harmonica on "Another Round"

Technical personnel

- Nick Raskulinecz – recording, mixing
- John Lousteau – recording and mixing assistance
- Bob Ludwig – mastering

== Chart positions ==
=== Album charts ===
Chart (2006)	Peak position
Australian Albums (ARIA)	11
Austrian Albums (Ö3 Austria)	30
Canadian Albums (Billboard)	7
Belgian Albums (Ultratop Flanders)	37
German Albums (Offizielle Top 100)	67
Irish Albums (IRMA)	33
New Zealand Albums (RMNZ)	1
Norwegian Albums (VG-lista)	37
Scottish Albums (OCC)	25
Swedish Albums (Sverigetopplistan)	51
Swiss Albums (Schweizer Hitparade)	40
UK Albums (OCC)	35
US Billboard 200	21

=== Live in Hyde Park DVD charts ===
Chart (2008)	Peak position
Swiss DVD Chart (Sverigetopplistan)	10

== Certifications ==
=== Skin and Bones album and DVD certifications ===
Region	Certification	Certified units/sales
Australia (ARIA) Album	Gold	35,000^{^}
Australia (ARIA) DVD	2× Platinum	30,000^{^}
Ireland (IRMA) album	Gold	7,500^{^}
New Zealand (RMNZ) Album	Platinum	15,000^{^}
New Zealand (RMNZ) DVD	Gold	2,500^{^}
United Kingdom (BPI) Album	Platinum	300,000^{‡}
^{^} Shipments figures based on certification alone.^{‡} Sales+streaming figures based on certification alone.

=== Live in Hyde Park DVD certifications ===
Region	Certification	Certified units/sales
Australia (ARIA)	4× Platinum	60,000^{^}
^{^} Shipments figures based on certification alone.^{‡} Sales+streaming figures based on certification alone.
