= Everywhere but Home =

Video by Foo Fighters
- Released: November 25, 2003
- Recorded: Various dates
- Genres: Alternative rock, post-grunge
- Label: Roswell/RCA
- Director: Maurice Linnane

Foo Fighters chronology
Everywhere but Home (2003)	Skin and Bones (2006)

Everywhere but Home is a live DVD by the Foo Fighters, released November 25, 2003. It contains performances taken from their world tour in February 2003, which were a part of the One by One album tour.

== Track listing ==
=== Toronto (Live At Arrow Hall, Toronto, Canada; 7th July 2003) ===
1. "All My Life"
2. "My Hero"
3. "Breakout"
4. "Have It All"
5. "Generator"
6. "Learn to Fly"
7. "For All the Cows"
8. "Stacked Actors"
9. "Low"
10. "Hey, Johnny Park!"
11. "Monkey Wrench"
12. "Times Like These" (Acoustic version)
13. "Aurora"
14. "Tired of You"
15. "Everlong"

=== Live At Black Cat Washington, D.C., 1st May 2003 ===
1. "Doll" (Acoustic)
2. "See You" (Acoustic)
3. "For All the Cows" (Acoustic)
4. "Everlong" (Acoustic)

=== Slane Castle (Live At Slane Castle, 23rd August 2003) ===
1. "All My Life"
2. "Everlong"

=== Reykjavík (Live At Laugardalshöll, Reykjavik, Iceland audio only; 26th August 2003) ===
1. "All My Life"
2. "The One"
3. "Times Like These"
4. "My Hero"
5. "Learn to Fly"
6. "Have It All"
7. "For All the Cows"
8. "Breakout"
9. "Generator"
10. "Stacked Actors"
11. "Low"
12. "Hey, Johnny Park!"
13. "Monkey Wrench"
14. "Aurora"
15. "Weenie Beenie"
16. "Tired of You"
17. "Everlong"

=== Dublin (Hidden concert; The Ambassador, Dublin, 12 July 2002) ===
- "All My Life"
- "Breakout"
- "The One"
- "My Hero"
- "Aurora"
- "Low"
- "Everlong"

=== Hidden Song ===
1. "My Hero" (Acoustic)

== Bonus content ==
=== Hidden recording of the Dublin concert ===
Accessed by following these steps:

- Go to the main menu
- Select "Slane Castle"
- Press 3, wait for the red arrow to reappear
- Press 8, wait for the red arrow to reappear
- Repeat the previous steps for 2, 5, 4 and 6.

=== My Hero (acoustic) ===
Follow these steps:

- Go to the main menu
- Play the Washington, D.C./Black Cat concert
- Approximately 4:22 into the title, the text "D.C." will appear in the lower right corner
- Press enter on the controller while the text is visible
- A new menu appears with an option to play "FUNNY SHIT"

== Personnel ==
Personnel per Everywhere but Home DVD. (Note: The band members' instruments are not credited in the DVD notes. Their instruments are listed based on their de facto live performance roles in the group.)

Foo Fighters

- Dave Grohl – lead vocals, rhythm guitar
- Chris Shiflett – lead guitar, backing vocals
- Nate Mendel – bass
- Taylor Hawkins – drums

Additional personnel

- Danny Clinch – harmonica, photos
- Nick Raskulinecz – mixing
- Mastered by either Bob Ludwig or Adam Ayan
- Vivian Ng – art direction

Video personnel

- Maurice Linnane – director
- John Cutcliffe – executive producer
- Michael Meisel – executive producer
- John Silva – executive producer
