= Live at Wembley Stadium (Foo Fighters video) =

Video by Foo Fighters
- Released: August 25, 2008 (UK)
- Recorded: 6th and 7th June 2008
- Venues: Wembley Stadium (London, England)
- Genres: Alternative rock, hard rock
- Length: 118:47
- Label: RCA / Roswell / BMG
- Director: Nick Wickham
- Producer: Foo Fighters

Foo Fighters chronology
Skin and Bones (2006)	Live at Wembley Stadium (2008)	Back and Forth (2011)

Live at Wembley Stadium is a live video by the Foo Fighters, filmed during the band's two sold-out shows at Wembley Stadium on Friday June 6 and Saturday June 7, 2008. The video features a combination of footage from both nights, including the second night's collaboration with special guests John Paul Jones (bass guitar) and Jimmy Page (guitar), formerly members of Led Zeppelin.

It was released on August 22, 2008, in Ireland and August 25, 2008, in the UK on DVD. It was also released in Australia on August 30, New Zealand on September 1, and Germany, Austria and Switzerland on September 5. It was released in the United States on November 18, 2008.

The video was also broadcast via satellite across the UK at Vue Cinemas on June 24, 2008. The video was shown in high definition with 5.1 surround sound, and was the same cut as the video release.

The release has been certified 3 times platinum by the Australian Recording Industry Association and gold by the Recording Industry Association of New Zealand.

The image on the artwork was shot by the aerial camera above the crowd on Friday 6 June.

== Track listing ==
1. "The Pretender" (Dave Grohl, Taylor Hawkins, Nate Mendel, Chris Shiflett)
2. "Times Like These" (Grohl, Hawkins, Mendel, Shiflett)
3. "No Way Back" (Grohl, Hawkins, Mendel, Shiflett)
4. "Cheer Up, Boys (Your Make Up Is Running)" (Grohl, Hawkins, Mendel, Shiflett)
5. "Learn to Fly" (Grohl, Hawkins, Mendel)
6. "Long Road to Ruin" (Grohl, Hawkins, Mendel, Shiflett)
7. "Breakout" (Grohl, Hawkins, Mendel)
8. "Stacked Actors"/"Hocus Pocus" (Grohl, Hawkins, Mendel)/(Jan Akkerman, Thijs van Leer)
9. "Skin and Bones" (Grohl)
10. "Marigold" (Grohl)
11. "My Hero" (Grohl, Mendel, Pat Smear)
12. "Cold Day in the Sun" (Hawkins)
13. "Everlong" (Grohl)
14. "Monkey Wrench" (Grohl, Mendel, Smear)
15. "All My Life" (Grohl, Hawkins, Mendel, Shiflett)
16. "Rock and Roll" (John Bonham, John Paul Jones, Jimmy Page, Robert Plant)
17. "Ramble On" (Page, Plant)
18. "Best of You" (Grohl, Hawkins, Mendel, Shiflett)

Notes

- Tracks 8, 9, 13 and 14 recorded on Friday, June 6, 2008
- Tracks 1–7, 10–12 and 15–18 recorded on Saturday, June 7, 2008
- Multiple other songs were played across both nights but were omitted from the film;
  - "But, Honestly", "DOA", and "Generator" were performed on June 6.
  - "Let It Die" was performed on June 7.
  - "This Is a Call" and "Big Me" were performed on both nights.
- "Rock And Roll" and "Ramble On" were only performed the second night.

== Charts ==
Chart (2008)	Peak position
Australian Music DVDs Chart	2
Austrian Music DVDs Chart	6
Dutch Music DVDs Chart	10
German Albums Chart	68
Irish Music DVDs Chart	1
New Zealand Music DVDs Chart	1
Swiss Music DVDs Chart	8

Chart (2011)	Peak position
Finnish Music DVDs Chart	3
Swedish Music DVDs Chart	3

== Personnel ==
=== Band members ===
- Dave Grohl – lead vocals, backing vocals, rhythm and lead guitar, drums on "Rock and Roll"
- Taylor Hawkins – drums, backing vocals, lead vocals on "Cold Day in the Sun" and "Rock and Roll"
- Nate Mendel – bass
- Chris Shiflett – lead and rhythm guitar, backing vocals

=== Touring members ===
- Pat Smear – acoustic and electric guitar
- Rami Jaffee – piano, Mellotron, accordion, organ
- Jessy Greene – violin, cello, backing vocals
- Drew Hester – percussion, vibraphone

=== Special guests ===
- Jimmy Page – guitar on "Rock and Roll" and "Ramble On"
- John Paul Jones – bass guitar on "Rock and Roll" and "Ramble On"
