= Breakout (Foo Fighters song) =

2000 single by Foo Fighters

- A variant of standard artwork

Single by Foo Fighters

from the album There Is Nothing Left to Lose and Me, Myself & Irene soundtrack
- Released: September 18, 2000 (UK)
- Recorded: March–June 1999
- Genre: Pop-punk; grunge-pop
- Length: 3:21
- Label: Roswell, RCA
- Songwriters: Dave Grohl; Nate Mendel; Taylor Hawkins
- Producers: Foo Fighters and Adam Kasper; Emma Lyne and Sam Cunningham (live)

Foo Fighters singles chronology
"Generator" (2000)	"Breakout" (2000)	"Next Year" (2000)

Music video
- "Breakout" on YouTube

"Breakout" is a song by Foo Fighters. It is the second track and fourth single from their third album There Is Nothing Left to Lose (1999).

== History ==
The single was released as a two disc set in the UK and Europe, and also had separate releases in the Netherlands, Australia and Japan. Promotional singles were also released in the US for radio play.

The song appeared as a playable track in Lego Rock Band.

== Music video ==
The video was directed by The Malloys, and served as a tie-in to the song's appearance in the film Me, Myself & Irene. It mainly features Dave Grohl playing a character who has a "multiple personality" disorder (just like Charlie Baileygates/Hank, Jim Carrey's character in the film) while taking his girlfriend to see the movie at a drive-in. In addition to Grohl's mom, Ginny, as the woman who flips him off while he is driving, the video also features some of the actors from the Me, Myself & Irene including Traylor Howard, who played Charlie's ex-wife Layla, and Tony Cox, who played the limo driver, along with Anthony Anderson, who played Jamal Baileygates & Jerod Mixon who played Shonté Jr. Baileygates. The MTV series Making the Video documented the making of the music video.

== Live recordings ==
A live version recorded on November 23, 1999, at the Barrowlands for the BBC Radio 1's Rock Show programme was released as a B-side to the CD versions of the "Generator" single.

Two live versions were released on the Everywhere but Home DVD, recorded in Toronto and Reykjavík.

A live version filmed at Hyde Park on June 17, 2006, was released on the Live at Hyde Park DVD.

A live version filmed at Wembley Stadium on June 7, 2008, was released on the Live at Wembley Stadium DVD.

== Track listings ==
UK CD1 white cover

1. "Breakout" - 3:21
2. "Iron and Stone" (The Obsessed cover) - 2:52
3. "Learn to Fly" (live from Sydney, Australia, January 24, 2000) - 3:38

UK CD2 grey cover, Europe CD white cover

1. "Breakout" - 3:21
2. "Monkey Wrench" (live from Melbourne, Australia February 1, 2000) - 4:23
3. "Stacked Actors" (live from Sydney, Australia, January 24, 2000) - 5:21

Japanese version white cover

1. "Breakout"
2. "Iron & Stone" (The Obsessed cover)
3. "Ain't It the Life" (live acoustic at 2 Meter Session, 22 Nov 1999)
4. "Learn to Fly" (live from Sydney, Australia, January 24, 2000)
5. "Stacked Actors" (live from Sydney, Australia, January 24, 2000)

Australia CD white cover

1. "Breakout"
2. "Monkey Wrench" (live from Melbourne, Australia February 1, 2000)
3. "Next Year" (live from Melbourne, Australia February 1, 2000)

Netherlands CD Live in Holland, part one

1. "Breakout"
2. "Floaty" (live acoustic at 2 Meter Session, 22 Nov 1999)
3. "Ain't It the Life" (live acoustic at 2 Meter Session, 22 Nov 1999)
4. "Next Year" (live acoustic at 2 Meter Session, 22 Nov 1999)

== Personnel ==
- Dave Grohl – vocals, guitars
- Nate Mendel – bass guitar
- Taylor Hawkins – drums

== Chart positions ==
Chart (2000)	Peak position
Australia (ARIA)	59
Canada Rock/Alternative (RPM)	15
Netherlands (Single Top 100)	63
UK Singles (Official Charts)	29
UK Rock & Metal (Official Charts)	2
US Mainstream Rock (Billboard)	11
US Alternative Airplay (Billboard)	8

== Certifications ==
Region	Certification	Certified units/sales
Australia (ARIA)	Gold	35,000^{‡}
United Kingdom (BPI)	Silver	200,000^{‡}
^{‡} Sales+streaming figures based on certification alone.
