= Thor (soundtrack) =

Thor (Original Motion Picture Soundtrack)

Film score by Patrick Doyle
- Released: May 3, 2011
- Recorded: 2011
- Genre: Film score
- Length: 71:53
- Labels: Buena Vista; Marvel Music
- Producers: Kenneth Branagh; Kevin Feige; Dave Jordan; Mitchell Leib

Patrick Doyle chronology
La Ligne droite (2011)	Thor (Original Motion Picture Soundtrack) (2011)	Jig (2011)

Thor (Original Motion Picture Soundtrack) is the soundtrack to the Marvel Studios film of the same name, based on the character created by Marvel Comics. The music was composed by Patrick Doyle, conducted by James Shearman and performed by the London Symphony Orchestra. Buena Vista Records announced the details for the soundtrack in March 2011. It was released in some European territories at the end of April and in the United States on May 3.

== Track listing ==
All music is composed by Patrick Doyle.

No.	Title	Length
1.	"Chasing the Storm"	3:11
2.	"Prologue"	3:09
3.	"Sons of Odin"	1:48
4.	"A New King"	3:00
5.	"Ride to Observatory"	2:10
6.	"To Jotunheim"	2:19
7.	"Laufey"	3:40
8.	"Frost Giant Battle"	4:22
9.	"Banishment"	1:53
10.	"Crisis In Asgard"	2:18
11.	"Odin Confesses"	2:43
12.	"Hammer Found"	1:11
13.	"Urgent Matter"	2:21
14.	"The Compound"	7:40
15.	"Loki's Lie"	1:54
16.	"My Bastard Son"	2:39
17.	"Science and Magic"	2:53
18.	"The Destroyer"	2:57
19.	"Forgive Me"	2:40
20.	"Thor Kills the Destroyer"	1:53
21.	"Brothers Fight"	6:59
22.	"Letting Go"	3:17
23.	"Can You See Jane?"	2:23
24.	"Earth to Asgard"	2:33
Total length:		1:11:53

== Reception ==
Professional ratings
Review scores
Source	Rating
AllMusic	3.5/5 stars
Empire	4/5 stars
Film Score Reviews	3/5 stars
Filmtracks	4/5 stars
Movie Music UK	3/5 stars
ScoreNotes	8.5/10 stars
Tracksounds	8/10 stars

James Christopher Monger of AllMusic stated that, "Composer Patrick Doyle, who brought a new-found boldness to the Harry Potter franchise in 2005 with his Goblet of Fire score, treats director Kenneth Branagh's big-screen adaptation of Marvel Comic's iconic Norse superhero Thor with appropriate gravitas. The longtime Branagh collaborator (Henry V, Dead Again) sets the stage with "Chasing the Storm," a tense and surging unveiling of the main theme, which sounds a bit like a cross between the James Newton Howard and Hans Zimmer's Batman Begins cue and Zimmer's "CheValiers de Sangreal" theme from The Da Vinci Code, and like Zimmer, Doyle knows how to whip a circular melody into a frenzy. Elsewhere, the lovely and appropriately stoic "Sons of Odin" is awash in traditional fantasy elements, while the epic "Compound" unveils a more modern, sci-fi action approach, resulting in a score that's wistful, heroic, and as grand as the fantastic realm of Asgard itself".

Danny Graydon of Empire stated, "Reuniting with long-time collaborator Kenneth Branagh, Patrick Doyle's score successfully mixes Wagnerian "Sturm und Drang" ("Frost Giant Battle") with cues brimming with nobility ("Chasing The Storm") and dramatic richness ("Odin Confesses" and "Banishment"). He also creates an engaging melodic core via the opposing themes of Thor and Loki and reaps dividends from his concerted distinction of the worlds of Asgard and Earth. It's just a shame that the omnipresence of choirs and percussion in current action scores somewhat dilutes the dynamism of Doyle's climatic cues".

== Charts ==
Weekly chart performance for Thor (Original Motion Picture Soundtrack)
Chart (2011)	Peak position
UK Soundtrack Albums (OCC)	16
