= Play (Dave Grohl EP) =

EP by Dave Grohl
- Released: August 10, 2018
- Genres: Progressive rock, alternative rock, progressive metal
- Length: 23:00
- Labels: Roswell, RCA
- Producer: Dave Grohl

Music video
- "Play" on YouTube

Play is a 23-minute instrumental composition composed and performed by Dave Grohl and released in 2018.

== Recording and composition ==
Dave Grohl stated that he was inspired by his daughters' music lessons to undertake one of the most challenging projects of his career. As the front man of rock band Foo Fighters, Grohl found some time during their world tour for their Concrete and Gold album to write and record the 23-minute instrumental. Grohl stated that he was inspired by watching children at music classes, including his daughters, rehearsing songs over and over again to play them perfectly. Grohl also created a two part documentary that includes him performing seven different versions of "Play" and interviewing young students at the Join the Band music school near his home in Los Angeles. Grohl plays all of the instruments on the 23-minute "Play". However, when he debuted the song live he recruited members from another of his side projects, Them Crooked Vultures and also the band Jane's Addiction. They debuted it live on December 8, 2018 at The Warren Haynes Christmas Jam in Asheville.

== Personnel ==
- Dave Grohl – electric and acoustic guitars, bass guitars, drums, Wurlitzer electric piano, synthesizers, Mellotron, vibraphone, timpani, percussion
- Darrell Thorp – engineering, mixing
- Tyler Shields – assistant engineer
- David Ives – mastering

== Charts ==
=== Weekly charts ===
Singles charts

Chart (2018)	Position
UK Physical Singles (Official Charts Company)	1
UK Vinyl Singles (Official Charts Company)	1
UK Rock & Metal (Official Charts)	33

Album charts

Chart (2018)	Position
Canadian Albums (Billboard)	66
US Billboard 200	124
US Digital Albums (Billboard)	7
US Vinyl Albums (Billboard)	3
US Top Album Sales (Billboard)	15
US Top Rock Albums (Billboard)	21
US Top Hard Rock Albums (Billboard)	6
US Top Alternative Albums (Billboard)	10
US Soundtrack Albums (Billboard)	9

=== Year-end charts ===
Chart (2018)	Position
UK Vinyl Singles (Official Charts Company)	19

== Accolades ==
Year	Publication	Country	Accolade	Rank
2019	The Guardian	United Kingdom	Dave Grohl's Landmark Songs	N/A
