= The X-Files: The Album =

Soundtrack album by various artists
- Released: June 2, 1998
- Length: 67:30
- Label: Elektra

Singles from The X-Files: The Album
- 1. "The X-Files Theme" Released: June 8, 1998 (Japan); 2. "Walking After You" Released: August 17, 1998; 3. "One" Released: October 25, 1998 (Japan)

The X-Files: The Album is a 1998 soundtrack album released to accompany the film The X-Files. Released on June 2, 1998, the album features songs by various artists, including several who had contributed to the earlier album Songs in the Key of X: Music from and Inspired by the X-Files, and consists mostly of cover versions or reworkings of earlier material.

The X-Files: The Album received mostly positive criticism upon its release, and charted in several countries worldwide, recording a peak position of number 5 in New Zealand.

== Production ==
Although The X-Files: The Album is the soundtrack to the 1998 film The X-Files, only one of the album's songs—"Crystal Ship" by X—is actually heard during the film, briefly playing on a jukebox during a brief scene, while "Teotihuacan" by Noel Gallagher and "Walking After You" by Foo Fighters play over the ending credits. Gallagher, along with Ian Brown, later reworked his track as "Keep What Ya Got", for Brown's album Solarized.

The album's producer, David Was, intended to match the film's tone rather than using the songs as content, leading to several of the artists involved contributing material which would seem "uncharacteristically eerie" compared to their usual work.

Many of the songs on The X-Files: The Album are cover versions or reworkings of earlier material—singer Sting collaborated with the group Aswad to perform a reggae cover of "Invisible Sun", which he had earlier recorded with The Police; Filter's "One" is a rearrangement of a song made famous by Three Dog Night; while Foo Fighters contributed a new version of their song "Walking After You". All but one of the album's tracks are exclusive to the soundtrack, with Björk's "Hunter" having been previously released on the 1997 album Homogenic. Several of the artists on the album's roster—Foo Fighters, Filter and Soul Coughing—had previously contributed material to Songs in the Key of X: Music from and Inspired by the X-Files, the soundtrack album which accompanied the television series; however, Chris Carter, creator of The X-Files, stated before the album's release that although "there are some similarities" between the records, "there are different artists and a different flavor".

The inclusion of a track by the group Ween was spurred by fact that The X-Files star David Duchovny had first met then-wife Téa Leoni through their mutual appreciation for the group; while the Cardigans were approached about contributing material after Carter saw them performing on a tour of the United States. The Filter cover of "One" was deliberately constructed by Was once he realized that Duchovny had ad-libbed the song's opening line during one of the film's scenes. The album's final track—a cover by Dust Brothers of Mark Snow's opening theme for the television series—features a hidden track which plays after a period of silence. The track features a spoken word segment by Carter which explains the series' overarching mythology up to the film's release.

== Release ==
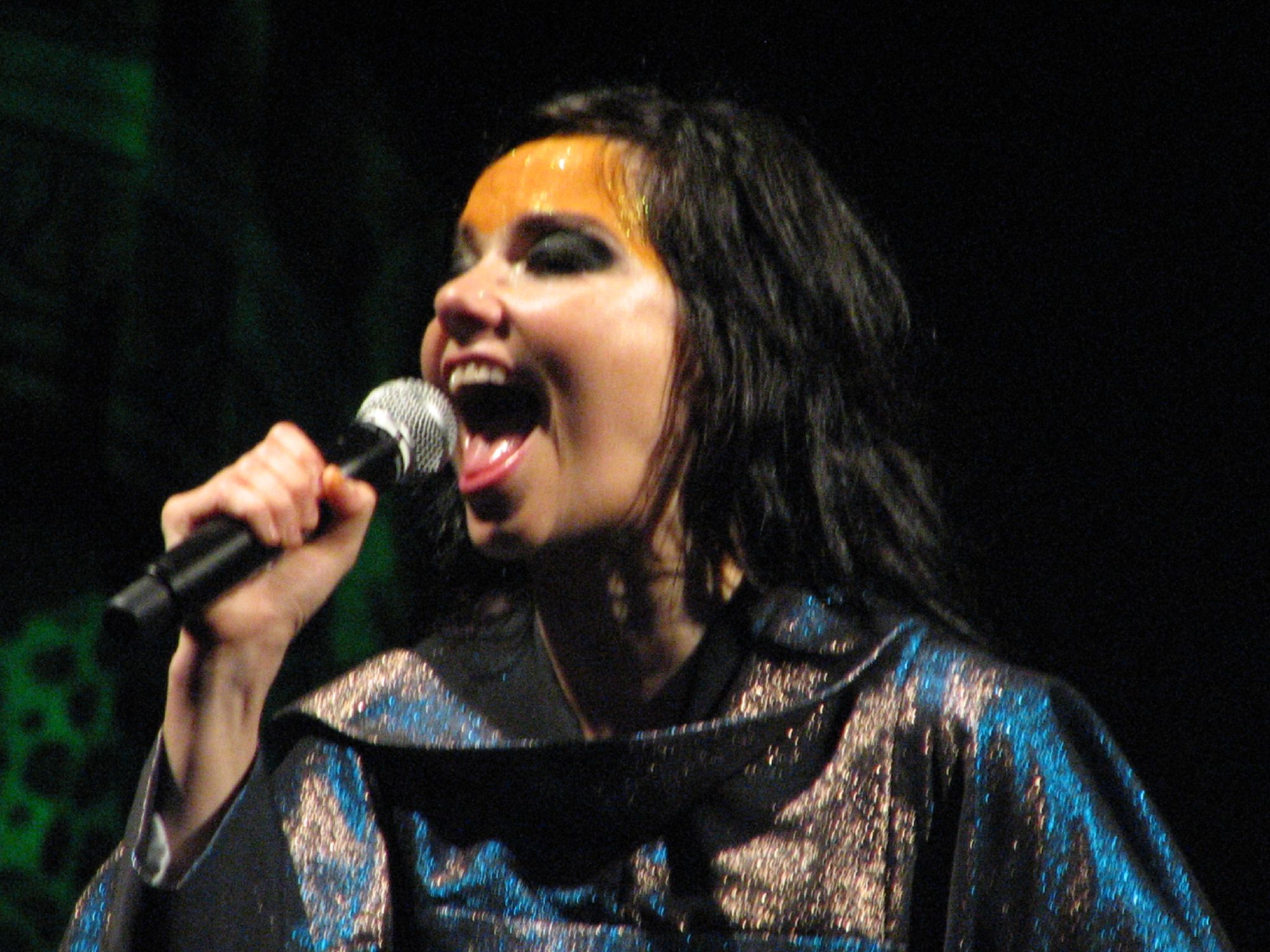
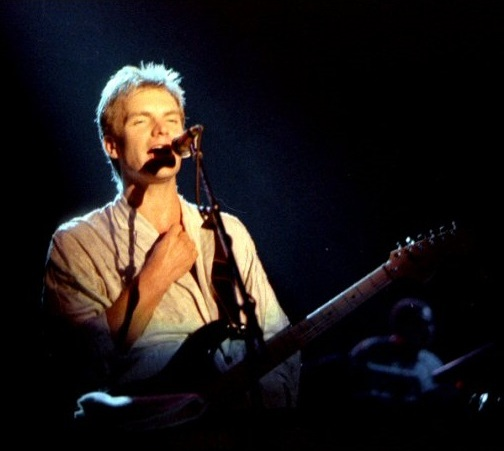
The X-Files: The Album featured music by Björk (left) and Sting (right).

The X-Files: The Album was first released on June 2, 1998, with international releases occurring between July and October that same year. The soundtrack appeared in several charts upon its release, reaching a peak position of 26 in the United States' Billboard 200 albums chart, 21 in Austria's Ö3 Austria Top 40, 27 in Australia's ARIA Charts, and 5—its highest chart position—in the Official New Zealand Music Chart.

Chart history
| Country | Chart | Peak position | Ref |
|---|---|---|---|
| Australia | ARIA Charts | 27 | |
| Austria | Ö3 Austria Top 40 | 21 | |
| New Zealand | Official New Zealand Music Chart | 5 | |
| United States | Billboard 200 | 26 | |

== Reception ==
Professional ratings
Review scores
| Source | Rating |
|---|---|
| AllMusic | 4/5 stars |
| Chicago Sun-Times | 1.5/4 stars |
| Entertainment Weekly | B− |

The X-Files: The Album has received generally positive reviews. AllMusic's Stephen Thomas Erlewine awarded the soundtrack four stars out of five, calling it "the best alt-rock soundtrack of the summer of 1998". Erlewine felt that the album was more polished and well-produced than Songs in the Key of X; however, he noted that this came at the expense of the earlier record's "quirky" and "off-kilter" aesthetic. Erlewine singled out "Beacon Light" and "Hunter" as particular highlights of the album. Jim Rogatis of the Chicago Sun-Times rated the album one-and-a-half stars out of four, finding the album to be predictable and "phone[d] in"; he highlighted the songs by Filter, Foo Fighters, Björk and Ween to be particular low points for him.

Writing for Entertainment Weekly, David Browne rated the album a B−, finding that it "isn’t eccentric enough" compared to the film or series. Browne found that the contributions by Noel Gallagher and Ween matched the tone of The X-Files, but felt that Tonic, Filter, Sting and Aswad had been included out of commercial rather than artistic interest. Keith Phipps of The A.V. Club considered the soundtrack to be less interesting than the accompanying film score, finding the album's roster to be formulaic and several of its tracks to not be particularly "revelatory" or "radical".

== Track listing ==
| No. | Title | Artist | Length |
|---|---|---|---|
| 1. | "One" | Filter | 4:40 |
| 2. | "Flower Man" | Tonic | 2:56 |
| 3. | "Walking After You" | Foo Fighters | 4:07 |
| 4. | "Beacon Light" | Ween | 4:01 |
| 5. | "Invisible Sun" | Sting and Aswad | 4:08 |
| 6. | "Deuce" | The Cardigans | 3:32 |
| 7. | "One More Murder" | Better Than Ezra | 4:38 |
| 8. | "More Than This" | The Cure | 5:10 |
| 9. | "Hunter" | Björk | 3:30 |
| 10. | "16 Horses" | Soul Coughing | 2:37 |
| 11. | "Crystal Ship" | X | 2:20 |
| 12. | "Black" | Sarah McLachlan | 4:30 |
| 13. | "Teotihuacan" | Noel Gallagher | 7:06 |
| 14. | "The X-Files Theme" (includes hidden track (Note: Final track contains a spoken word hidden track by Chris Carter)) | Dust Brothers | 14:15 |
| Total length: | | | 67:30 |
