= There Is Nothing Left to Lose =

1999 studio album by Foo Fighters

Studio album by Foo Fighters
- Released: November 2, 1999
- Recorded: March – June 1999
- Studios: Dave's House (Alexandria, Virginia); Conway (Los Angeles)
- Genres: Alternative rock; post-grunge; heartland rock; grunge
- Length: 46:19
- Labels: Roswell; RCA
- Producers: Foo Fighters; Adam Kasper

Foo Fighters chronology
The Colour and the Shape (1997)	There Is Nothing Left to Lose (1999)	One by One (2002)

Singles from There Is Nothing Left to Lose
- 1. "Learn to Fly" Released: October 18, 1999; 2. "Stacked Actors" Released: January 17, 2000 (Aus.); 3. "Generator" Released: March 6, 2000; 4. "Breakout" Released: September 18, 2000; 5. "Next Year" Released: December 4, 2000

There Is Nothing Left to Lose is the third studio album by American rock band Foo Fighters, released on November 2, 1999, through Roswell and RCA Records. It marked the first studio credit for drummer Taylor Hawkins, although the frontman Dave Grohl still providing the drums on some of the songs, and this is the band's final release until But Here We Are (2023) which Grohl performed on drums, as Hawkins permanently assigned as the full-time drummer on the band's subsequent releases until his death. The album is often seen as a departure from the band's previous work, showcasing a softer, more experimental sound. Grohl has called it his favorite Foo Fighters album, stating that it was "totally based on melody" and that the recording process was a serene experience. The album was recorded using only three musicians; Grohl, Hawkins, and bassist Nate Mendel in the basement of Grohl's home in Alexandria, Virginia.

There Is Nothing Left to Lose won the Grammy Award for Best Rock Album in 2001, marking the band's first ever Grammy win. The band would go on to win the Grammy for Best Rock Album for three of their next four studio releases (One by One; Echoes, Silence, Patience & Grace; and Wasting Light).

There Is Nothing Left to Lose is Foo Fighters' first album to be entirely released and marketed by RCA Records since their departure from Capitol Records after the release of The Colour and the Shape two years earlier. Their two previous studio albums, originally distributed by Capitol, were since then distributed by RCA.

== Background ==
Prior to recording, guitarist Franz Stahl was fired after about a year as frontman Dave Grohl felt the guitarist had not found his place in the band. Grohl decided the band would be a three-piece for the record: himself along with bassist Nate Mendel and drummer Taylor Hawkins.

Having just exhausted themselves in the studio making the last record The Colour and the Shape and losing two band members in the process, Grohl decided to buy a house in Alexandria, Virginia and make the record in its basement without any record company presence during production. This was helped by the Foo Fighters' leaving Capitol Records after president Gary Gersh left the label. Grohl named his home facility Studio 606, at first saying, "It's just one of those numbers that's everywhere. Like when you wake up in the middle of the night and it's 6:06, or you see a license plate that says 606." He later told the full story of the number's significance in a July 20, 2020, Instagram post: spending the evening with his father in 1985, he received a particularly searing "what do you want to do with your life" lecture that defines the bittersweet moment he finally communicated to his father the depth of his commitment to becoming a professional musician, before sneaking out. "606" was his father's apartment number.

The album is the first to feature Hawkins on drums. He performed on the majority of album, while leaving the faster songs for Grohl to play. The liner notes of the album do not specify who plays on which songs, although Hawkins states "Aurora" and "M.I.A." are good examples of his playing style, and that he plays the "jazzier" drums parts.

Grohl set up the studio with the help of Adam Kasper, who eventually co-produced the album. The biggest challenge, according to Grohl, was making the record sound good without computer programs such as Pro Tools or AutoTune. Dave Grohl notes that he had:

"[...] been living in Los Angeles for about a year and a half, just being a drunk, getting fucked up every night and doing horrible shit, and I'd finally gotten sick of that new car smell. So I bought this great house in Virginia and told everyone I was building a studio in the basement. It was literally a basement with sleeping bags on the walls!"

In a 1999 interview during the production of the album, Grohl commented on what the song "Ain't It the Life" meant to him:

"Ain't It the Life" I think is the one song that I would love to play on my porch [...] Living in Los Angeles for a year and a half, I think it ignited that hatred that I'd had for so long of things that are false, and glamorous, and just not real. Getting back to Virginia was such a nice feeling of community, family, and the D.C. music scene, old friends, and things that I'd never lost but felt like I needed more of in my life. So "Ain't It the Life" is just kind of about living the quiet, Virginia life.

In 2006, Grohl stated:

"It was all about just settling into the next phase of your life, that place where you can sit back and relax because there had been so much crazy shit in the past three years. At that point it was me, Taylor and Nate and we were best friends. It was one of the most relaxing times of my whole life. All we did was eat chili, drink beer and whiskey and record whenever we felt like it. When I listen to that record it totally brings me back to that basement. I remember how it smelled and how it was in the Spring so the windows were open and we'd do vocals until you could hear the birds through the microphone. And more than any other record I've ever done, that album does that to me."

== Title and artwork ==
The title emerged to Grohl as he talked to a friend "about when you experience these emotions after you've been through a long, difficult period and you finally give into this feeling that, quite simply, there is nothing left to lose. It can seem... positive, desperate and reckless." The frontman also said that it represented the band's mood during production: "we just wrote off and played like all bets were off. No one was forcing us to be there, so it had to be fun—and the songs had to be the best we could possibly come up with at the time."

The cover art features the band's initials on the back of Grohl's neck.

== Release and promotion ==
After the album was ready, the band signed with RCA Records to distribute the album. For promotion, the label focused on "getting the Foo Fighters brand out there", setting up the band's official website, and arranging appearances on broadcast television and events such as the Gravity Games. There Is Nothing Left to Lose was released in an Enhanced CD featuring the music video for the first single, "Learn to Fly", along with song lyrics and photographs.

While the album was recorded as a three-piece, Grohl decided that he still needed a second guitarist for the live performances. After open auditions in which 35 musicians were tested, the band hired Chris Shiflett, whom Grohl considered the best guitarist and singer who auditioned, and "he fit in with the rest of us so well", particularly for his background in punk rock bands. In September 1999, the band performed club dates in New York and Los Angeles, to both showcase the new songs and test Shiflett's performance with the group. The There Is Nothing Left To Lose tour started in 2000. The North American leg was overlapped with the Red Hot Chili Peppers' Californication Tour.

Early pressings of the disc included a temporary tattoo, similar to the one featured on the album cover. The album was also re-released in 2001 in Australia as a two-CD edition which offers a second VCD disc of four videos and one bonus track, "Fraternity". This version also came with a special release album cover. The cover featured Australian Olympic swimmer, Michael Klim, with the aforementioned temporary tattoo on his shoulder.

== Critical reception ==
Professional ratings
Review scores
Source	Rating
AllMusic	4/5 stars
Alternative Press	4/5
Entertainment Weekly	B+
The Guardian	4/5 stars
Los Angeles Times	2.5/4 stars
NME	3.5/5 stars
Q	4/5 stars
Rolling Stone	3.5/5 stars
The Rolling Stone Album Guide	2.5/5 stars
USA Today	3/4 stars

Reviews for There Is Nothing Left to Lose were generally positive. Rolling Stone's Greg Kot rated the album three-and-a-half out of five stars. He started by explaining that "the first thirty seconds [...] are a bridge to singer Dave Grohl's past." He stated further, comparing the album to the Goo Goo Dolls' "Iris", that "[Grohl's] punk background makes him allergic to string sections." However, he said that it "nonetheless marks a departure, with greater emphasis on melody and actual singing." In a retrospective review, AllMusic's Stephen Thomas Erlewine rated the album four out of five stars, explaining that "it is the first Foo Fighters album that sounds like the work of a unified, muscular band, and the first one that rocks really hard." Furthermore, he stated that it "has a stripped-down sound and an immediate attack that makes even the poppier numbers rock hard." He concluded that "[Foo Fighters] make it sound easy and fun [...] they're getting better as they're losing members and growing older, which is certainly a rarity in rock & roll."

In another retrospective review, a reviewer for Sputnikmusic rated it 3.5 out of 5 points. He explained that it was "consistent and includes sufficient highlights" overall. He went on to state that "Stacked Actors" "successfully utilizes some cool guitar effects as well as the quiet/loud formula that the band has become known for." He further stated that "Breakout" "is a really satisfying mix of melody and rock that ends up a genuinely memorable tune." However, he stated that ""Headwires" [...] musically begins like a mediocre mid-80's radio-rock effort and then simply lacks the necessary grunt to salvage it later on." Comparing the album to The Colour and the Shape, he stated that while the newer album is "more consistent", "a number of tracks ... [are] rather straight-forward and lacking that certain memorable factor which so helped its predecessor."

== Awards ==
"When we won for best rock album, which we made in my basement, I was so proud – because we made it in my basement in a crappy makeshift studio that we put together ourselves. I stood there looking out at everybody in tuxedos and diamonds and fur coats, and I thought we were probably the only band that won a Grammy for an album made for free in a basement that year."

— Dave Grohl, 2012

Grammy Awards

Awards for There Is Nothing Left to Lose
Year	Winner	Category	Result
2001	There Is Nothing Left to Lose	Best Rock Album	Won
2001	"Learn to Fly"	Best Short Form Music Video	Won

== Track listing ==
All tracks are written by Dave Grohl, Nate Mendel, and Taylor Hawkins.

No.	Title	Length
1.	"Stacked Actors"	4:16
2.	"Breakout"	3:21
3.	"Learn to Fly"	3:55
4.	"Gimme Stitches"	3:42
5.	"Generator"	3:48
6.	"Aurora"	5:49
7.	"Live-In Skin"	3:52
8.	"Next Year"	4:36
9.	"Headwires"	4:37
10.	"Ain't It the Life"	4:15
11.	"M.I.A."	4:03
Total length:		46:16

Australian/Japanese mini LP bonus track
No.	Title	Length
12.	"Fraternity"	3:09
Total length:		49:25

== Personnel ==
=== Foo Fighters ===
- Dave Grohl – vocals, guitars, drums, percussion, loops, Mellotron on "Next Year", talk box on "Generator"; production, art direction
- Nate Mendel – bass guitar; production, art direction
- Taylor Hawkins – drums; production, art direction

=== Production ===
- Adam Kasper – producer, recording, mixing (tracks 1, 2, 4, 5, 8–11)
- Andy Wallace – mixing (tracks 3, 6, 7)
- John Nelson – assistant mixing engineer (tracks 1, 2, 4, 5, 8–11)
- Tod Reiger – assistant mixing engineer (tracks 3, 6, 7)
- Bob Ludwig – mastering
- Henry Marquez – art direction
- Danny Clinch – photography

== Charts ==
=== Weekly charts ===
Weekly chart performance for There Is Nothing Left to Lose
Chart (1999)	Peak position
Australian Albums (ARIA)	5
Austrian Albums (Ö3 Austria)	34
Belgian Albums (Ultratop Flanders)	46
Canada Top Albums/CDs (RPM)	4
Dutch Albums (Album Top 100)	59
European Top 100 Albums (Music & Media)	17
Finnish Albums (Suomen virallinen lista)	25
French Albums (SNEP)	62
German Albums (Offizielle Top 100)	23
New Zealand Albums (RMNZ)	12
Norwegian Albums (VG-lista)	8
Scottish Albums (Official Charts)	33
Swedish Albums (Sverigetopplistan)	7
UK Albums (Official Charts)	10
US Billboard 200	10

=== Year-end charts ===
1999 year-end chart performance for There Is Nothing Left to Lose
Chart (1999)	Position
Canadian Albums (RPM)	51
UK Albums (OCC)	169

2000 year-end chart performance for There is Nothing Left to Lose
Chart (2000)	Position
Australian Albums (ARIA)	91
UK Albums (OCC)	127
US Billboard 200	117

== Certifications ==
Certifications for There Is Nothing Left to Lose
Region	Certification	Certified units/sales
Australia (ARIA)	2× Platinum	140,000^{^}
Canada (Music Canada)	Platinum	100,000^{^}
Japan (RIAJ)	Gold	100,000^{^}
United Kingdom (BPI)	2× Platinum	600,000^{‡}
United States (RIAA)	Platinum	1,000,000^{^}
^{^} Shipments figures based on certification alone.^{‡} Sales+streaming figures based on certification alone.
