= All My Life (Foo Fighters song) =

2002 single by Foo Fighters

- Standard artwork

Single by Foo Fighters

from the album One by One
- B-side: "Sister Europe"; "Win or Lose"; "Danny Says"; "The One"
- Released: September 24, 2002
- Recorded: May 2002
- Genre: Hard rock; post-grunge; alternative rock; post-hardcore
- Length: 4:24
- Label: Roswell; RCA
- Songwriters: Dave Grohl; Taylor Hawkins; Nate Mendel; Chris Shiflett
- Producers: Foo Fighters; Nick Raskulinecz

Foo Fighters singles chronology
"The One" (2002)	"All My Life" (2002)	"Times Like These" (2003)

Music video
- "All My Life" on YouTube

"All My Life" is a song by American rock band Foo Fighters, released on September 24, 2002 as the lead single from their fourth album, One by One. The song won a Grammy Award for Best Hard Rock Performance, and spent ten consecutive weeks atop the Alternative Songs chart, and peaked at number three on the Hot Mainstream Rock Tracks chart. It was also a top five hit on the UK Singles Chart.

== Background ==
According to Dave Grohl, the song "was originally an instrumental and it went through a few different versions. At first it was really dissonant and noisy. The middle section sounded like "Wipe Out" [by the Surfaris]. It was just nuts! We recorded the instrumental and I had no idea how I was gonna sing it. Again, that was another one that our manager said, "That's the song!" And we said, "Really? You think that's the one people will like?" Grohl has said that the song is about how he enjoys performing oral sex on women. "['All My Life'] is a little dirty. I'm very fond of giving oral sex to women. It's a pleasure-giving experience - giving someone something that they'll remember for the rest of their lives, and if you do it right, they will."

== Release and reception ==
The song won a Grammy Award for Best Hard Rock Performance, spent ten straight weeks at number 1 on the Hot Modern Rock Tracks chart, and peaked at number 3 on the Hot Mainstream Rock Tracks chart. It was also a top 5 hit on the UK Singles Chart.

It also became the 6th best performing alternative song on the Alternative Songs chart of the decade and the 10th best performing rock song on the Rock Songs chart of the decade. Dave Grohl notes that the band wanted a heavier-sounding song for a single, saying the band was "coming out with "Learn to Fly" and "Next Year" and other songs that had middle-of-the-road melodies." In September 2023, for the 35th anniversary of Alternative Songs (which by then had been renamed to Alternative Airplay), Billboard published a list of the top 100 most successful songs in the chart's history; "All My Life" was ranked at number 55.

In March 2005, Q magazine placed "All My Life" at number 94 in its list of the 100 Greatest Guitar Tracks. It was nominated for the Kerrang! Award for Best Single.

"All My Life" is widely regarded as one of the Foo Fighters' best songs. In 2020, Kerrang ranked the song number two on their list of the 20 greatest Foo Fighters songs, and in 2021, American Songwriter ranked the song number five on their list of the 10 greatest Foo Fighters songs.

== Other versions ==
A version recorded during Episode 8 of Series 20 of Later... with Jools Holland on November 26, 2002, at the BBC Television Centre was released on the DVD "Later... Louder with Jools Holland". An unaired interview with Grohl and drummer Taylor Hawkins recorded on the same day was included as an exclusive bonus feature on the DVD.

A live version filmed at Hyde Park on June 17, 2006, was released on the Live at Hyde Park DVD.

A live version filmed at Wembley Stadium on June 7, 2008, was released on the Live at Wembley Stadium DVD.

== In other media ==
The song appeared in the 2003 film Identity and in the 2004 film The Perfect Score. The song was also used on the trailer for the 2005 film Sahara, starring Matthew McConaughey and Penelope Cruz. It was also released as downloadable content for the Rock Band video game series on August 18, 2009. The song is also playable on both Rock Revolution and Guitar Hero On Tour: Modern Hits.

Welsh rock band Feeder, use the opening lines from this song as an interlude during live performances of "Lost and Found". It was also used in the promotional video for the Australian Tennis Open by Eurosport(Din).

Part of the song was used to highlight nominee Spider-Man in the Best Movie montage at the 2003 MTV Movie Awards.

In Chile, the song was featured in the children's puppet television show 31 Minutos episode "Ahorrando", while they fighting Calcetín con Rombos Man and the iron.

== Personnel ==
Personnel based on the band members' de facto primary roles in the group.

- Dave Grohl – vocals, rhythm guitar
- Chris Shiflett – lead guitar
- Nate Mendel – bass
- Taylor Hawkins – drums

== Track listing ==
CD1:

1. "All My Life"
2. "Sister Europe" (The Psychedelic Furs cover)
3. "Win or Lose"

"All My Life" (Director's Cut video) [enhanced section]
"Win or Lose" is a reworked version of an older song, "Make a Bet" (from Learn to Fly Disc 2).

CD2:

1. "All My Life"
2. "Danny Says" (Ramones cover)
3. "The One"

7" vinyl/Japanese CD single:

1. "All My Life"
2. "Sister Europe" (The Psychedelic Furs cover)

Promo

1. "All My Life" (Radio Edit) 4:13
2. "All My Life" 4:22

== Music video ==
The video, directed by Grohl, is a performance video because he wanted to "sort of show everybody this is what it's like when we play live" as opposed to the comedic videos the band had done before such as "Big Me" and "Learn to Fly". In the video, the band (with Chris Shiflett making his first appearance in an official Foo Fighters music video) performs the song on stage in front of a video screen at The Forum in Inglewood, California, near Los Angeles (the video was actually shot inside Bakersfield's Mechanics Bank Arena, which was called Centennial Garden at the time). At the conclusion, it is revealed that they had been performing in an empty arena. In January 2021, Grohl revealed that he has dreams about still being in Nirvana and that there is an empty arena waiting for them to play.

The video was included on a DVD extra that was packaged with the CD version of the album. As of November 2023, the song has 107 million views on YouTube.

== Charts ==
=== Weekly charts ===
Weekly chart performance for "All My Life"
Chart (2002–2003)	Peak position
Australia (ARIA)	20
Europe (European Hot 100 Singles)	22
Germany (GfK)	93
Ireland (IRMA)	14
Italy (FIMI)	30
Netherlands (Single Top 100)	95
New Zealand (Recorded Music NZ)	46
Norway (VG-lista)	13
Quebec Airplay (ADISQ)	24
Scotland Singles (Official Charts)	5
Sweden (Sverigetopplistan)	37
UK Singles (Official Charts)	5
UK Rock & Metal (Official Charts)	1
US Billboard Hot 100	43
US Alternative Airplay (Billboard)	1
US Mainstream Rock (Billboard)	3

=== Year-end charts ===
Year-end chart performance for "All My Life"
Chart (2002)	Position
UK Singles (Official Charts Company)	159

=== Decade-end charts ===
Decade-end chart performance for "All My Life"
Chart (2000–2009)	Peak position
US Hot Alternative Songs (Billboard)	6
US Hot Rock Songs (Billboard)	10

== Certifications ==
Certifications for "All My Life"
Region	Certification	Certified units/sales
Australia (ARIA)	2× Platinum	140,000^{‡}
Brazil (Pro-Música Brasil)	Gold	30,000^{‡}
Mexico (AMPROFON)	Gold	30,000^{‡}
New Zealand (RMNZ)	Platinum	30,000^{‡}
United Kingdom (BPI)	Platinum	600,000^{‡}
^{‡} Sales+streaming figures based on certification alone.
