= The One (Foo Fighters song) =

- Australian and New Zealand single

Single by Foo Fighters

from the album Orange County The Soundtrack and One by One (limited edition bonus DVD)
- B-side: "Win or Lose"
- Released: March 18, 2002
- Recorded: 2001
- Length: 2:44
- Label: RCA
- Songwriter(s): Dave Grohl; Taylor Hawkins; Nate Mendel; Chris Shiflett
- Producer(s): Foo Fighters; Adam Kasper

Foo Fighters singles chronology
"Next Year" (2000)	"The One" (2002)	"All My Life" (2002)

Music video
- "The One" on YouTube

"The One" is a song by Foo Fighters, released as a single in 2002. It appeared on the soundtrack album for the film Orange County. The retail single itself was only released in Australia and New Zealand, but it was made available by import in the US and UK; further, promotional singles for radio airplay were sent out to a number of countries, including Canada, the UK, and the US. It is available through the Foo Files digital album collection.

The song was also released as a B-side to the CD2 version of the single "All My Life" and on the Limited Edition Bonus DVD of certain copies of the One by One album. In the UK, one copy each of seven different versions of the single were released—3" CD, CD, MiniDisc, cassette, 12" vinyl, 10" vinyl, and 7" vinyl—and were given away as prizes. As such, they have become the most highly sought-after Foo Fighters collectibles.

The cover art resembles the cover art of Fame. The video for the song (directed by Jesse Peretz) is loosely based on the movie, seeing the band members attending several art courses; Dave Grohl studies acting, Nate Mendel studies to be a mime, Taylor Hawkins studies violin, and Chris Shiflett attempts ballet. In the video, Dave tries unsuccessfully to get the attention of a classmate.

When it aired on MTV, the chorus was slightly altered. The unedited version goes, "You're not the one, but you're the only one who can make me feel like this / You're not the one, but you're the only one who can make me feel like shit!" The edited version simply repeats the first line twice so as to avoid the climactic expletive.

This song was featured in the 8th season of MTV series Making the Video.

== Track listing ==
1. "The One"
2. "Win or Lose" (a reworked version of the song "Make a Bet" from "Learn to Fly" disc 2)
3. Enhanced section that includes "The One" music video.

== Charts ==
Chart performance for "The One"
Chart (2002)	Peak position
Australia (ARIA)	21
Quebec Airplay (ADISQ)	26
Scotland (OCC)	70
UK Singles (OCC)	77
UK Rock & Metal (OCC)	5
US Bubbling Under Hot 100 Singles (Billboard)	21
US Alternative Airplay (Billboard)	14
US Mainstream Rock (Billboard)	20
