= Next Year =

2000 single by Foo Fighters

- Standard artwork

Single by Foo Fighters

from the album There Is Nothing Left to Lose
- Released: December 4, 2000
- Recorded: 1999
- Studio: Dave's House (Alexandria, Virginia); Conway (Los Angeles)
- Length: 4:37
- Label: Roswell; RCA
- Songwriters: Dave Grohl; Nate Mendel; Taylor Hawkins
- Producers: Foo Fighters; Adam Kasper

Foo Fighters singles chronology
| "Breakout" (2000) | "Next Year" (2000) | "The One" (2002) |

Music video
- "Next Year" on YouTube

"Next Year" is a song by American rock band the Foo Fighters, released on December 4, 2000, as the fifth and final single from their third studio album, There Is Nothing Left to Lose (1999).

== History ==
A shorter version (running at just 3:21 compared to the original's 4:36) was released as a single in 2000 and was used in the music video. Backup vocals were added, and it does not include the outro present in the original album version.

== Style ==
The song features a Mellotron, making it the first song by the band to have a keyboard on it. Dave Grohl said that he wanted to add it to make the song more of a "Sgt. Pepper's rip off."

SPIN Magazine proclaimed the song "a power ballad in the "Wonderwall" sense", remarking that the band are "at their loveliest when aping peak-popularity Britpop".

== Ed theme song ==
The opening of "Next Year" was used as the theme song for the NBC television series Ed (2000–2004). The show's creators, Rob Burnett and Jon Beckerman (formerly of the Late Show with David Letterman) used the song despite knowledge of production company Viacom's insistence that they own the rights to the show's theme song. "Next Year" was thus ultimately replaced by Clem Snide's "Moment in the Sun" during the second season. As a result of outcries from Burnett and Beckerman, however, Viacom relented and "Next Year" returned as the theme song in the third and fourth seasons.

== Music video ==
The video, directed by Phil Harder, shows the band in a remake of the Apollo 11 Moon mission and incorporates heavy use of NASA stock footage. They experience zero-gravity in the space capsule (where they conduct experiments and perform the song with instruments), land on the Moon, plant a Foo Fighters flag, and return to Earth where they are welcomed back as heroes during a ticker-tape parade. Many moments and images of the Apollo era are re-enacted, such as the band meeting President Richard Nixon, bassist Nate Mendel golfing on the Moon (a nod to Alan Shepard during Apollo 14), and depictions of Vietnam war protests. The video ends with a portrait of the band in the style of a traditional astronaut crew photo. This bears a strong resemblance to the cover of Led Zeppelin's Best of Led Zeppelin compilation.

== Track listing ==
CD1 dark cover:
(Also comes with the first 6 months of a 2001 poster calendar)

1. "Next Year"
2. "Big Me" (acoustic radio performance, 2 Meter Sessions, Netherlands 22 November 1999)
3. "Next Year" (acoustic radio performance, 2 Meter Sessions, Netherlands 22 November 1999)

CD2 light cover:
(Also comes with the second 6 months of a 2001 poster calendar)

1. "Next Year"
2. "Baker Street" (Gerry Rafferty cover)

Enhanced CD-ROM, includes "Next Year" video

Australia CD:

1. "Next Year"
2. "Next Year" (Dave Way remix)
3. "Monkey Wrench" (Melbourne, Australia on 1 February 2000)

7 inch:

1. "Next Year"
2. "Next Year" (Acoustic Radio Performance, 2 Meter Sessions, Netherlands 22 November 1999)

Japan EP

1. "Next Year"
2. "Have a Cigar" (Pink Floyd cover)
3. "Make a Bet"
4. "Floaty" (Acoustic Radio Performance, 2 Meter Sessions, Netherlands 22 November 1999))
5. "Monkey Wrench" (Melbourne, Australia on 1 February 2000)

Netherlands Live in Holland, part two

1. "Next Year" (Dave Way remix)
2. "My Hero" (Live at the Melkweg 29 February 2000)
3. "For All the Cows" (Live at the Melkweg 29 February 2000)
4. "Monkey Wrench" (Live at the Melkweg 29 February 2000)

== Chart positions ==
| Chart (2000) | Peak position |
|---|---|
| Australia (ARIA) | 85 |
| Canada Rock/Alternative (RPM) | 12 |
| Netherlands (Single Top 100) | 92 |
| Quebec Airplay (ADISQ) | 35 |
| UK Singles (Official Charts) | 42 |
| UK Rock & Metal (Official Charts) | 2 |
| US Adult Alternative Airplay (Billboard) | 14 |
| US Alternative Airplay (Billboard) | 17 |
| US Adult Pop Airplay (Billboard) | 40 |
