= Walking After You =

1998 single by Foo Fighters

Song by Foo Fighters

from the album The Colour and the Shape
- Released: May 20, 1997
- Recorded: 1996
- Studio: WGNS (Washington, D.C.)
- Length: 5:03
- Label: Roswell, Capitol
- Songwriter: Dave Grohl
- Producer: Gil Norton

Audio video
- "Walking After You" on YouTube

"Walking After You"

Single by Foo Fighters

from the album The X-Files: The Album
- Released: August 17, 1998
- Recorded: 1998
- Studio: Ocean Way Recording (Hollywood, California)
- Genre: Alternative rock
- Length: 4:08
- Label: Roswell, Capitol
- Songwriter: Dave Grohl
- Producer: Jerry Harrison

Foo Fighters singles chronology
"My Hero" (1998)	"Walking After You" (1998)	"Learn to Fly" (1999)

Music video
- "Walking After You" on YouTube

"Walking After You" is a song by Foo Fighters and appears on the band's 1997 album The Colour and the Shape. In 1998 a re-recorded version appeared on The X-Files: The Album, the soundtrack to the original X-Files movie, and was released as a single.

== Song information ==
While none of the X-Files album songs are prominently featured in the movie itself, "Walking After You" is played during the end credit sequence, following Noel Gallagher's "Teotihuacan." The single's B-side is Ween's "Beacon Light". Foo Fighters had previously contributed a cover of Gary Numan's "Down in the Park" to the compilation album, Songs in the Key of X: Music From and Inspired by the X-Files.

"Walking After You" was a hit in the UK and was performed live on the chart show Top of the Pops. The song, along with the rest of The Colour and the Shape album was released as downloadable content for the Rock Band series of video games on November 13, 2008.

== Version differences ==
The original album version was created in December 1996 at WGNS Studios in Washington, D.C., in between recording sessions for The Colour and the Shape. It was performed by Grohl on vocals (in one take) and all instrument parts (except bass, which was performed by the band's bassist Nate Mendel), and was recorded by Geoff Turner.

The soundtrack/single version was performed by the full band, including then-recent additions Taylor Hawkins and Franz Stahl, with guest backing vocals from Shudder to Think's Craig Wedren. It was recorded in early 1998 at Ocean Way Studios in Hollywood, and was produced by Talking Heads member Jerry Harrison. As a result of trying to muster as much emotion as possible, Grohl broke down during the recording of the vocal take which ended up being used in the final mix. This version also utilizes the addition of a piano part during the bridge, performed by Harrison. Stylistically, it employs more intricate drumming and guitar work than the original—which is much more sparse—and runs about a minute shorter.

== Music video ==
The song's music video features a nattily-attired Grohl interacting with a woman (played by Spanish actress Arly Jover) in what appears to be an asylum or prison, where the two are separated by plate-glass windows. A stack of vintage television sets displays clips of retro fare such as Bela Lugosi films and Betty Boop cartoons.

It was directed by fashion photographer Matthew Rolston, who had also done videos for artists such as Janet Jackson, Madonna, and Lenny Kravitz. It was also the first Foo Fighters music video done in 16:9 Widescreen.

Before Rolston's involvement in the video, The X-Files star David Duchovny had expressed an interest in directing it, but was quick to admit his inexperience, saying "I wouldn't know what the hell I'm doing." The concept was also initially considered to have more of a direct relation to The X-Files in some way, which the finished video does not bear.

== Track listing ==
1. "Walking After You" (1998 version)
2. "Beacon Light" (performed by Ween)

The previously unreleased Ween song "Beacon Light" was used as a B-side as it also appears on the film soundtrack to The X-Files (1998).

== Personnel ==
=== The Colour and the Shape ===
- Dave Grohl – vocals, guitar, drums
- Pat Smear – guitar
- Nate Mendel – bass

=== The X-Files: The Album ===
Foo Fighters

- Dave Grohl – vocals, guitar
- Franz Stahl – guitar
- Nate Mendel – bass
- Taylor Hawkins – drums

Additional personnel

- Craig Wedren – backing vocals
- Jerry Harrison – piano

Ween

- Gene Ween - vocals
- Dean Ween - guitar, bass
- Claude Coleman Jr. - drums

== Charts ==
=== Weekly charts ===
Chart (1998)	Peak position
Australia (ARIA)	67
Europe (Eurochart Hot 100) with "Beacon Light"	87
Iceland (Íslenski Listinn Topp 40)	2
New Zealand (Recorded Music NZ)	48
Scotland Singles (Official Charts) with "Beacon Light"	15
UK Singles (Official Charts) with "Beacon Light"	20
US Adult Alternative Airplay (Billboard)	16
US Adult Pop Airplay (Billboard)	35
US Alternative Airplay (Billboard)	12

=== Year-end charts ===
Chart (1998)	Position
Iceland (Íslenski Listinn Topp 40)	11
US Modern Rock Tracks (Billboard)	62
