= Stacked Actors =

2000 single by Foo Fighters

Single by Foo Fighters

from the album There Is Nothing Left to Lose
- Released: January 17, 2000
- Recorded: 1999
- Genre: Grunge; hard rock; heavy metal
- Length: 4:16
- Label: Roswell/RCA
- Songwriters: Dave Grohl; Nate Mendel; Taylor Hawkins
- Producers: Foo Fighters; Adam Kasper

Foo Fighters singles chronology
"Learn to Fly" (1999)	"Stacked Actors" (2000)	"Generator" (2000)

"Stacked Actors" is a song by American rock band Foo Fighters, which was released as a single in January 2000 from their 1999 third album There Is Nothing Left to Lose. It was only released as a limited edition commercial single in Australia exclusively, however radio promotional singles were released in other countries for radio airplay.

The song is a playable track in the game Guitar Hero: Metallica and as downloadable content for Rock Band 3.

== Musical style ==
Justin Gerber of Consequence of Sound described "Stacked Actors" as "one of the heaviest songs the band has recorded" and "a grungy call to Grohls' past". Tim Coffman observed that the song showed Grohl "embracing his heavy metal dreams". It also has jazzy verses and ending as well, which are notably softer than the opening and choruses. The song plays at 136 bpm and is in standard guitar tuning, with the exception of the low-E string being tuned down to A, which creates the distinctive octave sound of the main riff.

== Lyrics ==
Dave Grohl on the song:

"'Stacked Actors' is a response to living in Hollywood for about a year and a half, and my disdain and disgust of everything plastic and phony, which is the foundation of that city. And I just hated it. I had a lot of fun, but I had a lot of fun hating it."

"I wrote 'Stacked Actors' about everything that is fake and everything that is plastic and glamorous and unreal, so if that pertains to anyone that comes to mind then there you go."

"It's about having nothing better to do than trying to be other people, it really grossed me out. Actors, just in general make me fucking sick."

"Living in Hollywood always seemed transitional to me. Truth be told, I fucking hated Hollywood, hated the whole life, hated most of the people we met. That's what I'm saying in 'Stacked Actors'."

Grohl dismissed rumors that the song was about Courtney Love.

== Live performances ==
On September 3, 1999, the Foo Fighters played a secret gig at the Troubador in Los Angeles playing using the pseudo band name Stacked Actors. The song was played at almost every show from 1999 until 2013. These version often features extended solos and a drum solo. The song was resurrected in 2019 and was played in its normal album version.

== Reception and accolades ==
"Stacked Actors" was ranked number 5 on WhatCulture's "10 Underrated Hard Rock Songs of the 90s" in 2020.

== Track listing ==
1. "Stacked Actors"
2. "Ain't It the Life" (Live Acoustic at 2 Meter Session 22 Nov 1999)
3. "Floaty" (Live Acoustic at 2 Meter Session 22 Nov 1999)

== Other versions ==
- A live version recorded in Sydney Australia, January 24, 2000 was released on the Australian Generator single and the Japanese Breakout single.
- Two live versions were released on the Everywhere but Home DVD, recorded in Toronto and Reykjavik.
- A live version filmed at Hyde Park on June 17, 2006 was released on the Live at Hyde Park DVD.
- A live version filmed at Wembley Stadium on June 6, 2008 was released on the Live at Wembley Stadium DVD.

== Chart positions ==
Chart (2000)	Peak position
Australia (ARIA)	82
US Mainstream Rock (Billboard)	9
US Alternative Airplay (Billboard)	25
