= Generator (Foo Fighters song) =

2000 single by Foo Fighters

- Continental European variant of standard artwork

Single by Foo Fighters

from the album There Is Nothing Left to Lose
- Released: March 6, 2000
- Recorded: 1999
- Genre: Alternative rock
- Length: 3:49
- Label: Roswell, RCA
- Songwriters: Dave Grohl; Nate Mendel; Taylor Hawkins
- Producers: Foo Fighters; Adam Kasper

Foo Fighters singles chronology
"Stacked Actors" (2000)	"Generator" (2000)	"Breakout" (2000)

Music video
- "Generator" on YouTube

"Generator" is a song by American rock band Foo Fighters, released as a single in 2000 from their third album, There Is Nothing Left to Lose (1999). The single was only released in Australia, and it was also released as a limited-edition single in Europe.

The song is unique among the band's work because of Dave Grohl's implementation of the talk box in parts of the song. The usage of the device was partly inspired by Grohl's admiration of Peter Frampton and Joe Walsh, both of whom helped popularize it in the 1970s.

== Track listing ==
=== Australian CD ===
(The EP also contains an enhanced segment containing exclusive documentary footage and photos)

1. "Generator"
2. "Learn to Fly" (Live 24 January 2000 Sydney, Australia)
3. "Stacked Actors" (Live 24 January 2000 Sydney, Australia)
4. "Breakout" (Live 23 November 1999 Glasgow Barrowlands, Scotland)

=== European CD ===
(This version was available for only 1 week between March 6 and March 12, 2000, each CD was a limited, numbered edition and at the end of the week of release all remaining stock was deleted. As well as the music tracks it also included a multimedia 'enhanced' segment containing exclusive documentary footage and photos)

1. "Generator"
2. "Ain't It the Life" (Live Acoustic at 2 Meter Session 22 Nov 1999)
3. "Floaty" (Live Acoustic at 2 Meter Session 22 Nov 1999)
4. "Fraternity"
5. "Breakout" (Live 23 November 1999 Glasgow Barrowlands, Scotland)

=== 7-inch ===
1. "Generator"
2. "Fraternity"

== Music video ==
No video was filmed for the single. Instead a live performance of the song recorded on February 1, 2000, at the Chapel Off Chapel in Melbourne, Australia was overdubbed with the studio version to promote the single and album. The performance was filmed and broadcast by Seven Network, with editor Scott C. Wilson making a new cut with the various different camera angles.

The music video for "Breakout" features the song "Generator" at the beginning on the video.

== Chart positions ==
Chart (2000)	Peak position
Australia (ARIA)	31
UK Rock & Metal (Official Charts)	12

== Certifications ==
Region	Certification	Certified units/sales
Australia (ARIA)	Gold	35,000^{‡}
^{‡} Sales+streaming figures based on certification alone.
