= Monkey Wrench (song) =

1997 single by Foo Fighters

- A variant of standard artwork

Single by Foo Fighters

from the album The Colour and the Shape
- Released: April 28, 1997
- Recorded: 1996–1997
- Studio: Grandmaster Recorders, Hollywood, California
- Genre: Alternative rock; pop-punk; grunge
- Length: 3:51
- Label: Roswell/Capitol
- Songwriters: Dave Grohl; Pat Smear; Nate Mendel
- Producer: Gil Norton

Foo Fighters singles chronology
| "Alone + Easy Target" (1996) | "Monkey Wrench" (1997) | "Everlong" (1997) |

Music video
- "Monkey Wrench" on YouTube

"Monkey Wrench" is a song by American rock band Foo Fighters. It was released as the lead single from their second album, The Colour and the Shape. The lyrics chronicle the 1997 disintegration of lead vocalist Dave Grohl's four-year marriage to Jennifer Youngblood. The song peaked at number 9 on the Billboard Mainstream Rock Tracks chart, and at number 12 on the UK Singles Chart.

== Composition and lyrics ==
"Monkey Wrench" is an up-tempo alternative rock, pop-punk and grunge song, written in the key of B major in 4/4 time signature with a tempo of 174 beats per minute. It is performed with distorted guitars in drop-D tuning. The song opens with a four bar phrase of a descending guitar line over a chordal riff of B^{5}–F♯^{5}–E^{5} repeated twice. After a single bar of 3/4 time, the main verse enters with vocals and a choppier, palm-muted version of the intro riff. A pre-chorus using an E^{5} power chord then gives way to a chord-based chorus of B^{5}–G♯^{5}–F♯^{5}–E^{5}–F♯^{5}–E^{5}–C^{5}–B^{5}.

Grohl has said that the song is "about realising that you are the source of all of the problems in a relationship and you love the other person so much, you want to free them of the problem, which is actually yourself."

== Critical reception ==
"Monkey Wrench" is widely regarded as one of the Foo Fighters' best songs. In 2020, Kerrang ranked the song number three on their list of the 20 greatest Foo Fighters songs, and in 2021, American Songwriter ranked the song number seven on their list of the 10 greatest Foo Fighters songs.

== Music video ==
The music video was directed by the band's lead singer/songwriter, Dave Grohl. In the video, Grohl arrives at his apartment with groceries in hand, but finds the door secured from inside by the chain latch when he tries to open it. Looking through the peephole, he finds black-clad duplicates of the band members playing the song. The rest of the band soon joins him at the door, peeking in through its mail slot, and eventually start trying to force their way in as the duplicate Grohl taunts them and spits on the peephole. He holds the door shut against the band's efforts for a while, but they eventually break in only to find the apartment suddenly empty. They look out the window and see the duplicates fleeing on foot through a courtyard, then close the door and finish the song using the abandoned instruments. As the video ends, a third set of bandmates is listening at the door outside, creating a recursive situation.

When Grohl is in the elevator heading up to his apartment, a muzak version of the Foo Fighters song "Big Me," performed by The Moog Cookbook, can be heard.

The music video for the song was the first to feature Taylor Hawkins on drums, although the actual drum track is performed by Grohl.

== Personnel ==
- Dave Grohl – vocals, guitar, drums
- Pat Smear – guitar
- Nate Mendel – bass

== Track listings and formats ==
- US 7" Vinyl / NT CD Single
1. "Monkey Wrench" – 3:54
2. "The Colour and the Shape" – 3:26
- AUS / EU / JP / UK CD Single
1. "Monkey Wrench" – 3:54
2. "Up in Arms" (Slow Version) – 3:11
3. "The Colour and the Shape" – 3:22
- UK CD 2
1. "Monkey Wrench" – 3:54
2. "Down in the Park" – 4:07
3. "See You" (Acoustic) – 2:27

== Charts ==
=== Weekly charts ===
| Chart (1997) | Peak position |
|---|---|
| Australia (ARIA) | 17 |
| Australia Alternative Singles (ARIA) | 1 |
| Canada Top Singles (RPM) | 37 |
| Canada Rock/Alternative (RPM) | 3 |
| European Hot 100 Singles (Music & Media) | 51 |
| Scottish Singles Sales (Official Charts) | 10 |
| UK Singles (Official Charts) | 12 |
| UK Rock & Metal (Official Charts) | 1 |
| US Radio Songs (Billboard) | 58 |
| US Alternative Airplay (Billboard) | 9 |
| US Mainstream Rock (Billboard) | 9 |

=== Year-end charts ===
| Chart (1997) | Position |
|---|---|
| US Mainstream Rock (Billboard) | 34 |
| US Alternative Rock (Billboard) | 49 |

== Certifications ==
| Region | Certification | Certified units/sales |
|---|---|---|
| Australia (ARIA) | 2× Platinum | 140,000^{‡} |
| New Zealand (RMNZ) | Platinum | 30,000^{‡} |
| United Kingdom (BPI) | Platinum | 600,000^{‡} |
^{‡} Sales+streaming figures based on certification alone.

== Accolades ==
| Year | Publication | Country | Accolade | Rank |
|---|---|---|---|---|
| 1999 | Kerrang! | United Kingdom | 100 Greatest Rock Tracks Ever | 48 |
| 2002 | Kerrang! | United Kingdom | 100 Greatest Singles of All Time | 26 |
| 2003 | Q | United Kingdom | 100 Greatest Songs Ever!! | 65 |
