= Learn to Fly =

1999 single by Foo Fighters

Single by Foo Fighters

from the album There Is Nothing Left to Lose
- B-side: "Iron and Stone"; "Have a Cigar"; "Make a Bet"
- Released: October 18, 1999
- Studio: Studio 606 (Virginia); Conway (Los Angeles)
- Genre: Alternative rock; post-grunge; power pop
- Length: 3:56
- Label: Roswell; RCA
- Songwriters: Dave Grohl; Nate Mendel; Taylor Hawkins
- Producers: Adam Kasper; Foo Fighters

Foo Fighters singles chronology
"Walking After You" (1998)	"Learn to Fly" (1999)	"Stacked Actors" (2000)

Music video
- "Learn to Fly" on YouTube

"Learn to Fly" is a song by American rock band Foo Fighters, released by Roswell and RCA Records on October 18, 1999. It was the lead single from their third studio album, There Is Nothing Left to Lose (1999). It was the band's first entry on the Billboard Hot 100, peaking at #19; and it remained their highest-charting song on the chart until "Best of You" peaked at number 18 in 2005. Outside of the U.S., it peaked within the top 40 in Australia, Canada, Hungary, the Netherlands, New Zealand, Poland and the United Kingdom. The song's music video won Best Short Form Video award at the 43rd Grammy Awards in 2001. The song is about Grohl wanting to learn how to be a pilot, as that was something he wanted to learn to be at the time.

== Release and reception ==
"Learn to Fly" was originally released as a promo-only single. It was officially released as a two-disc CD set in the UK and Australia, as well as in Europe, and promotional singles were also released in other countries such as the US for radio play.

In the US, it was the band's first appearance on the Billboard Hot 100, charting at number 19, and was the band's first number one on the Billboard Modern Rock Tracks chart.

It is also their highest-charting on the Billboard Hot 100 Airplay chart, along with the 1996 hit "Big Me", reaching number 13.

The song set the record for most weeks (13) at number one on the Canadian rock radio charts.

== Music video ==
The music video for the song was directed by Jesse Peretz and won the Grammy Award for Best Short Form Music Video in 2001.

It takes place on a commercial airliner, parodying the movie Airplane!, and by extension, the films Airport 1975 and its sequel Airport '77, interspersed with a mock concert footage of the band shown as an in-flight movie. The background elevator music is The Moog Cookbook's version of "Everlong".

Two airline cabin cleaners (played by Jack Black and Kyle Gass from Tenacious D) smuggle and hide their narcotics, labeled "World Domination brand 'Erotic' Sleeping Powder", in the coffee-maker. The flight attendants do not notice the narcotics when they use the coffee-maker, and everyone who drinks the resulting coffee becomes incapacitated. The take-off sequence, in addition to the crew members hiding ulterior criminal motives, are a near shot-by-shot homage to the film Airport '77.

The band, having avoided the coffee (choosing liquor instead), mirroring Karen Black's role in Airport 1975, find themselves forced to land the plane. For the video, each band member (Dave Grohl, Nate Mendel, and Taylor Hawkins) portrays himself as well as several other roles, including Hawkins as an attractive flight attendant and Grohl as an FBI agent who arrests the two cabin cleaners when they attempt to smuggle more of their narcotics.

== 2015 tribute video ==
On July 30, 2015, a video was published on YouTube of 1,000 Italian musicians in Cesena, all playing and singing the song in unison, followed by a plea for the Foo Fighters to come play a concert in Cesena. By August 16, it had gained more than 33 million views.

On July 31, Dave Grohl responded, in Italian, thanking the makers for "the beautiful video" and adding "Thank you so much. We're coming, I swear. We'll see each other soon." On November 3, 2015, in response, Foo Fighters performed a twenty-seven-song concert in Cesena for approximately 3,000 people, starting their set with "Learn to Fly".

The group assembled for the stunt have performed subsequently under the name Rockin' 1000, and have been described as the "biggest band in the world."

In August 2015, nearly 16 years after its initial release, the single entered the Austrian Singles Chart at number 69 and the Swiss Singles Chart at number 41.

== Other versions ==
A live version recorded in Sydney, Australia, on January 24, 2000, was released on the Australian "Generator" single and CD 1 of "Breakout".

== Critical reception ==
Greg Kot of Rolling Stone referred to the song as a "guilt-free power ballad". He noted that "on 'Learn to Fly', the big guitars and arching melody crush all quibbles. Some grunge romantics may even hear it as a touching little hymn to [Nirvana]".

In 2020, Kerrang ranked the song number 11 on their list of the 20 greatest Foo Fighters songs, and in 2021, American Songwriter ranked the song number three on their list of the 10 greatest Foo Fighters songs.

== Track listings and formats ==
- AUS / UK CD Single
1. "Learn to Fly" – 3:58
2. "Iron and Stone" (The Obsessed cover) – 2:52
3. "Have a Cigar" (Pink Floyd cover) – 3:58
- EU 7" Vinyl / EU CD 1 / UK Cassette
1. "Learn to Fly" – 3:58
2. "Have a Cigar" (Pink Floyd cover) – 3:58
- EU CD 2
1. "Learn to Fly" – 3:58
2. "Make a Bet" – 3:28
3. "Have a Cigar" (Pink Floyd cover) – 3:58

== Personnel ==
Personnel are adapted from the "Learn to Fly" CD single liner notes.

- Dave Grohl – lead vocals, guitar, drums and tambourine on "Learn to Fly"
- Nate Mendel – bass
- Taylor Hawkins – drums, lead vocals on "Have a Cigar"
- Brian May – guitar on "Have a Cigar"
- Foo Fighters – composition, lyrics, production, performance
- Adam Kasper – production, recording
- Andy Wallace – mixing
- Ted Reiger – second engineer
- Bob Ludwig – mastering

== Charts ==
=== Weekly charts ===
Chart (1999–2000)	Peak position
Australia (ARIA)	36
Canada Top Singles (RPM)	13
Canada Rock/Alternative (RPM)	1
Eurochart Hot 100 (Music & Media)	65
Netherlands (Dutch Top 40)	32
Netherlands (Single Top 100)	72
New Zealand (Recorded Music NZ)	23
Quebec Airplay (ADISQ)	3
Scottish Singles Sales (Official Charts)	15
Sweden (Sverigetopplistan)	52
UK Singles (Official Charts)	21
US Billboard Hot 100	19
US Alternative Airplay (Billboard)	1
US Mainstream Rock (Billboard)	2
US Adult Alternative Airplay (Billboard)	4
US Adult Pop Airplay (Billboard)	15
US Pop Airplay (Billboard)	22

Chart (2015)	Peak position
Austria (Ö3 Austria Top 40)	69
France (SNEP)	172
Germany (GfK)	97
Switzerland (Schweizer Hitparade)	41
UK Rock & Metal (Official Charts)	2
US Rock Digital Songs (Billboard)	14

Chart (2019)	Peak position
Hungary (Single Top 40)	19

=== Year-end charts ===
Chart (2000)	Position
Brazil (Crowley)	98

== Certifications ==
Region	Certification	Certified units/sales
Australia (ARIA)	4× Platinum	280,000^{‡}
Brazil (Pro-Música Brasil)	Platinum	60,000^{‡}
Canada (Music Canada)	Gold	20,000^{*}
Denmark (IFPI Danmark)	Gold	45,000^{‡}
Germany (BVMI)	Gold	300,000^{‡}
Italy (FIMI)	Gold	25,000^{‡}
Mexico (AMPROFON)	Platinum	60,000^{‡}
New Zealand (RMNZ)	2× Platinum	60,000^{‡}
Spain (Promusicae)	Gold	30,000^{‡}
United Kingdom (BPI)	2× Platinum	1,200,000^{‡}
United States (RIAA)	Platinum	1,000,000^{‡}
^{*} Sales figures based on certification alone.^{‡} Sales+streaming figures based on certification alone.

== Release history ==
Region	Date	Formats(s)	Label(s)	Ref(s).
United States	September 21, 1999	Mainstream rock; active rock; alternative radio	Roswell; RCA	
United Kingdom	October 18, 1999	CD; cassette	Roswell; RCA; BMG	
United States	November 2, 1999	Contemporary hit radio	Roswell; RCA	

== In popular culture ==
"Learn to Fly" appears in the political drama television series The West Wing episode Mr. Willis of Ohio, in the 1999 sports documentary Fift, in the 2002 animated comedy-drama television film Is It College Yet?, in the 2002 romantic comedy-drama Life or Something Like It and the 2016 animated film Rock Dog. The song is also featured as a playable track in the 2007 music video game Rock Band. It was most recently featured as the final song played at the 2025 season of Monster Jam, being featured at the sporting event’s 24th World Finals event in Salt Lake City, Utah.

== Other versions ==
Canadian country rock singer Cory Marks covered "Learn to Fly" on his 2024 album Sorry for Nothing.
