= List of awards and nominations received by Foo Fighters =

Foo Fighters awards and nominations
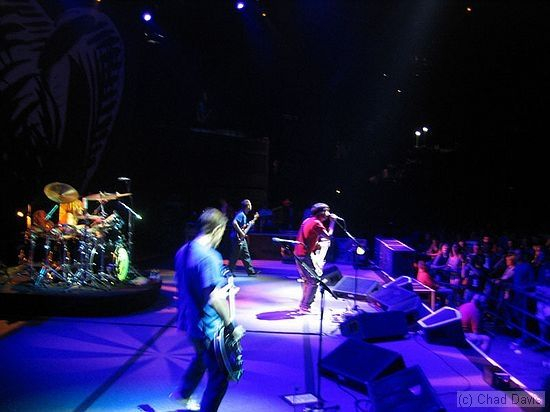
- Foo Fighters performing in Milwaukee in December 2006
Awards and nominations
Award	Wins	Nominations
American Music Awards	1	3
Billboard Music Awards	0	3
Brit Awards	5	8
Grammy Awards	15	32
Kerrang! Awards	6	6
MTV Australia Music Awards	0	5
MTV Europe Music Awards	0	14
MTV Video Music Awards	3	23
MTV Video Music Awards Japan	0	3
NME Awards	5	7
People's Choice Awards	0	1
Q Awards	0	2
Radio Music Awards	0	3
Teen Choice Awards	0	4

Totals (Note: Certain award groups do not simply award one winner. They acknowledge several different recipients, have runners-up, and have third place. Since this is a specific recognition and is different from losing an award, runner-up mentions are considered wins in this award tally. For simplification and to avoid errors, each award in this list has been presumed to have had a prior nomination.)
- Wins: 35
- Nominations: 113

This is a comprehensive list of major music awards and nominations received by Foo Fighters, an American rock band. Foo Fighters were formed in 1994 by lead singer Dave Grohl. Foo Fighters has received thirty-five awards from one hundred-thirteen nominations.

Their most successful performance at any one ceremony over time, is that of the Grammys with 15 wins, while the Kerrang Awards in the United Kingdom is their most successful in terms of winning every time they have been nominated, with 6 wins from 6 nominations.

== AltRock Awards ==
Year	Nominee / work	Award	Result
2018	Foo Fighters	Artist of the Year	Nominated
2018	Dave Grohl	Best Male Singer	Won

== American Music Awards ==
The American Music Awards is an annual award created by Dick Clark. The awards show is similar to the Grammy Awards and the MTV Video Music Awards.

Year	Award	Work	Result
2008	Favorite Alternative Artist	Foo Fighters	Nominated
2011	Favorite Alternative Artist	Foo Fighters	Won
2021	Favorite Rock Artist	Foo Fighters	Nominated

== BBC Music Awards ==
Year	Award	Work	Result
2017	Live Performance of the Year	Foo Fighters at Glastonbury	Won

== Billboard Music Awards ==
Year	Award	Work	Result
2012	Foo Fighters	Top Alternative Artist	Nominated
2012	Foo Fighters	Top Rock Artist	Nominated
2012	"Wasting Light"	Top Rock Album	Nominated

== Brit Awards ==
The Brit Awards are awarded annually in the United Kingdom. As of 2018, Foo Fighters has received five awards from eight nominations.

Year	Award	Work	Results
1996	Foo Fighters	International Breakthrough Act	Nominated
1996	Foo Fighters	International Group	Nominated
2003	Foo Fighters	International Group	Nominated
2008	Foo Fighters	International Group	Won
2008	Echoes, Silence, Patience & Grace	International Album	Won
2012	Foo Fighters	International Group	Won
2015	Foo Fighters	International Group	Won
2018	Foo Fighters	International Group	Won
2021	Foo Fighters	International Group	Nominated

== GAFFA Awards ==
=== Denmark GAFFA Awards ===
Delivered since 1991, the GAFFA Awards are a Danish award that rewards popular music by the magazine of the same name.

Year	Nominee / work	Award	Result	Ref.
2002	Foo Fighters	Best Foreign Band	Nominated	
2006	In Your Honor	Best Foreign Album	Nominated	
2007	Foo Fighters	Best Foreign Band	Nominated	
2018	Foo Fighters	Best Foreign Band	Nominated	

=== Sweden GAFFA Awards ===
Delivered since 2010, the GAFFA Awards (Swedish: GAFFA Priset) are a Swedish award that rewards popular music awarded by the magazine of the same name.

Year	Nominee / work	Award	Result	Ref.
2011	Wasting Light	Best Foreign Album	Won	
2018	"Run"	Best Foreign Song	Nominated	
2018	Concrete and Gold	Best Foreign Album	Nominated	

== Global Awards ==
Year	Award	Nominee/Work	Results
2018	Foo Fighters	Best Group	Nominated
2018	Foo Fighters	Best Indie	Nominated

== Grammy Awards ==
The Grammy Awards are awarded annually by the Recording Academy in the United States. Foo Fighters has received 15 awards from 35 nominations. They have won Best Rock Album five times, more than any other band.

Year	Work	Award	Result
1996	Foo Fighters	Best Alternative Music Performance	Nominated
1998	The Colour and the Shape	Best Rock Album	Nominated
1998	"Monkey Wrench"	Best Hard Rock Performance	Nominated
2001	There Is Nothing Left to Lose	Best Rock Album	Won
2001	"Learn to Fly"	Best Rock Performance by a Duo or Group with Vocal	Nominated
2001	"Learn to Fly"	Best Short Form Music Video	Won
2003	"All My Life"	Best Hard Rock Performance	Won
2003	"All My Life"	Best Rock Song	Nominated
2004	One by One	Best Rock Album	Won
2004	"Times Like These"	Best Rock Performance by a Duo or Group with Vocal	Nominated
2006	In Your Honor	Best Rock Album	Nominated
2006	"Best of You"	Best Rock Performance by a Duo or Group with Vocal	Nominated
2006	"Best of You"	Best Rock Song	Nominated
2006	"Virginia Moon" (with Norah Jones)	Best Pop Collaboration with Vocals	Nominated
2008	Echoes, Silence, Patience & Grace	Album of the Year	Nominated
2008	Echoes, Silence, Patience & Grace	Best Rock Album	Won
2008	"The Pretender"	Record of the Year	Nominated
2008	"The Pretender"	Best Hard Rock Performance	Won
2008	"The Pretender"	Best Rock Song	Nominated
2012	Wasting Light	Album of the Year	Nominated
2012	Wasting Light	Best Rock Album	Won
2012	"Walk"	Best Rock Performance	Won
2012	"Walk"	Best Rock Song	Won
2012	"White Limo"	Best Hard Rock/Metal Performance	Won
2012	Foo Fighters: Back and Forth	Best Long Form Music Video	Won
2016	"Something from Nothing"	Best Rock Performance	Nominated
2016	Foo Fighters: Sonic Highways	Best Music Film	Nominated
2018	"Run"	Best Rock Performance	Nominated
2018	"Run"	Best Rock Song	Won
2022	"Making a Fire"	Best Rock Performance	Won
2022	"Waiting on a War"	Best Rock Song	Won
2022	Medicine at Midnight	Best Rock Album	Won
2024	"Rescued"	Best Rock Performance	Nominated
2024	"Rescued"	Best Rock Song	Nominated
2024	But Here We Are	Best Rock Album	Nominated

== Kerrang! Awards ==
The Kerrang! Awards is an award show from Kerrang! Magazine. Foo Fighters received six awards.

Year	Award	Work	Results
1996	Best Album	Foo Fighters	Won
2000	Classic Songwriters	Foo Fighters	Won
2002	Hall Of Fame	Foo Fighters	Won
2005	Best Single	"Best of You"	Won
2018	Best International Band	Foo Fighters	Won
2018	Best International Live Act	Foo Fighters	Won

== MTV Awards ==
=== MTV Australia Music Awards ===
The MTV Australia Music Awards is the Australian version of the MTV Video Music Awards. Foo Fighters received five nominations.

Year	Award	Work	Results
2006	"In Your Honor"	Best Album	Nominated
2006	"Best of You"	Best Group Video	Nominated
2006	"Best of You"	Best Rock Video	Nominated
2008	"The Pretender"	Video of the Year	Nominated
2008	Echoes, Silence, Patience, and Grace Tour	Best Live Performer	Nominated

=== MTV Europe Music Awards ===
The MTV Europe Music Awards is an annuel award show from MTV Europe. Foo Fighters received eleven nominations.

Year	Award	Work	Results
2000	Best Video	"Learn to Fly"	Nominated
2000	Best Rock	Foo Fighters	Nominated
2005	Best Rock	Foo Fighters	Nominated
2007	Best Headliner	Foo Fighters	Nominated
2007	Best Video	"The Pretender"	Nominated
2008	Best Headliner	Foo Fighters	Nominated
2009	Best Rock	Foo Fighters	Nominated
2011	Best Rock	Foo Fighters	Nominated
2011	Best Live Act	Foo Fighters	Nominated
2011	Best North American Act	Foo Fighters	Nominated
2015	Best Rock	Foo Fighters	Nominated
2015	Best Live Act	Foo Fighters	Nominated
2017	Best Rock	Foo Fighters	Nominated
2017	Best World Stage	Foo Fighters	Nominated
2017	Best Video	"Run"	Nominated
2018	Best Rock	Foo Fighters	Nominated
2021	Best Rock	Foo Fighters	Nominated
2022	Best Rock	Foo Fighters	Nominated

=== MTV Video Music Awards ===
The MTV Video Music Awards were established in 1984 by MTV to celebrate the top music videos of the year. Foo Fighters has received three awards from twenty-six nominations.

Year	Award	Video	Results
1996	Best Group Video	"Big Me"	Won
1996	Video of the Year	"Big Me"	Nominated
1996	Best Alternative Video	"Big Me"	Nominated
1996	Best Direction in a Video	"Big Me"	Nominated
1997	Best Rock Video	"Monkey Wrench"	Nominated
1997	Best Alternative Video	"Monkey Wrench"	Nominated
1998	Best Rock Video	"Everlong"	Nominated
1998	Best Special Effects in a Video	"Everlong"	Nominated
1998	Best Art Direction in a Video	"Everlong"	Nominated
2000	Best Group Video	"Learn to Fly"	Nominated
2000	Best Direction in a Video	"Learn to Fly"	Nominated
2005	Best Rock Video	"Best of You"	Nominated
2005	Best Editing in a Video	"Best of You"	Nominated
2008	Best Rock Video	"The Pretender"	Nominated
2009	Best Video (That Should Have Won a Moonman)	"Everlong"	Nominated
2011	Best Rock Video	"Walk"	Won
2017	Best Rock	"Run"	Nominated
2018	Best Rock	"The Sky is a Neighborhood"	Nominated
2021	Best Rock	"Shame Shame"	Nominated
2021	Best Choreography	"Shame Shame"	Nominated
2021	Best Cinematography	"Shame Shame"	Nominated
2021	Global Icon	Foo Fighters	Won
2021	Group of the Year	Foo Fighters	Nominated
2022	Group of the Year	Foo Fighters	Nominated
2022	Best Rock	"Love Dies Young"	Nominated
2022	Best Longform Video	Studio 666	Nominated

=== MTV Video Music Awards Japan ===
The MTV Video Music Awards Japan is the Japanese version of the MTV Video Music Awards. Foo Fighters were nominated three times.

Year	Award	Work	Results
2003	Best Rock Video	"All My Life"	Nominated
2008	Best Rock Video	"The Pretender"	Nominated
2012	Best Video from a Film	"Walk" (from Thor)	Nominated

== NME Awards ==
The NME Awards is an annual award show from NME Magazine in the UK. Foo Fighters received five awards.

Year	Award	Work	Results
2008	Best Album of the Year	Echoes, Silence, Patience & Grace	Won
2011	Godlike Genius Award	Dave Grohl	Won
2012	Best International Band	Foo Fighters	Won
2012	Best Music Film	Back and Forth	Won
2013	Best International Band	Foo Fighters	Nominated
2013	Hero of the Year	Dave Grohl	Nominated
2015	Best International Band	Foo Fighters	Won
2016	Musical Moment of the Year	Dave Grohl	Nominated
2016	Hero of the Year	Dave Grohl	Won
2016	Best International Band	Foo Fighters	Nominated

== People's Choice Awards ==
The People's Choice Awards is an annual award show from CBS television. People vote for their favorite movies, TV shows, and music. Foo Fighters are nominated for one award.

Year	Award	Work	Results
2012	Favorite Band	Foo Fighters	Nominated

== Radio Music Awards ==
The Radio Music Awards is an annuel award show for the best radio music. Foo Fighters received three nominations.

Year	Award	Work	Results
2005	Artist of the Year/Alternative and Active Rock Radio	Foo Fighters	Nominated
2005	Song of the Year/Alternative and Active Rock Radio	"Best of You"	Nominated
2005	Song of the Year/Rock Radio	"Best of You"	Nominated

== Q Awards ==
The Q Awards is an annuel awards show from Q Magazine. Foo Fighters received two nominations.

Year	Award	Work	Results
2003	Best Act in the World Today	Foo Fighters	Nominated
2007	Best Act in the World Today	Foo Fighters	Nominated

== Teen Choice Awards ==
The Teen Choice Awards is an annual award show which first aired in 1999 by Fox Broadcasting Company. Foo Fighters received five nominations.

Year	Award	Work	Results
2003	Choice Rock Track	"Times Like These"	Nominated
2006	Choice Rock Band	Foo Fighters	Nominated
2011	Choice Rock Track	"Rope"	Nominated
2011	Choice Rock Band	Foo Fighters	Nominated
2012	Choice Rock Band	Foo Fighters	Nominated

== UK Music Video Awards ==
The UK Music Video Awards is an annual award ceremony founded in 2008 to recognise creativity, technical excellence and innovation in music videos and moving images for music.

Year	Nominee / work	Award	Result
2009	Live at Wembley Stadium	Best Live Music Coverage	Won
