= Hail Satin =

2021 album by Foo Fighters

Studio album / live album by Foo Fighters as "Dee Gees"
- Released: July 17, 2021
- Studio: Studio 606
- Genres: Disco; rock
- Length: 39:05
- Labels: Roswell; RCA
- Producer: Greg Kurstin

Foo Fighters chronology
Medicine at Midnight (2021)	Hail Satin (2021)	The Essential Foo Fighters (2022)

Professional ratings
Review scores
Source	Rating
AllMusic	3/5 stars
Pitchfork	5.4/10

Hail Satin is an album by the Dee Gees, a side project of American rock band Foo Fighters. It was released on July 17, 2021, for Record Store Day. The album consists of five cover versions of songs originally written and recorded by members of the Gibb family (four from the Bee Gees and one Andy Gibb solo record) and five live versions of songs from the Foo Fighters' 2021 album Medicine at Midnight on its B-side. The name "Dee Gees" is a play on both the Bee Gees and Dave Grohl's initials; the album title is a play on satin (a common fabric of the disco era) and the phrase "hail Satan".

== Background ==
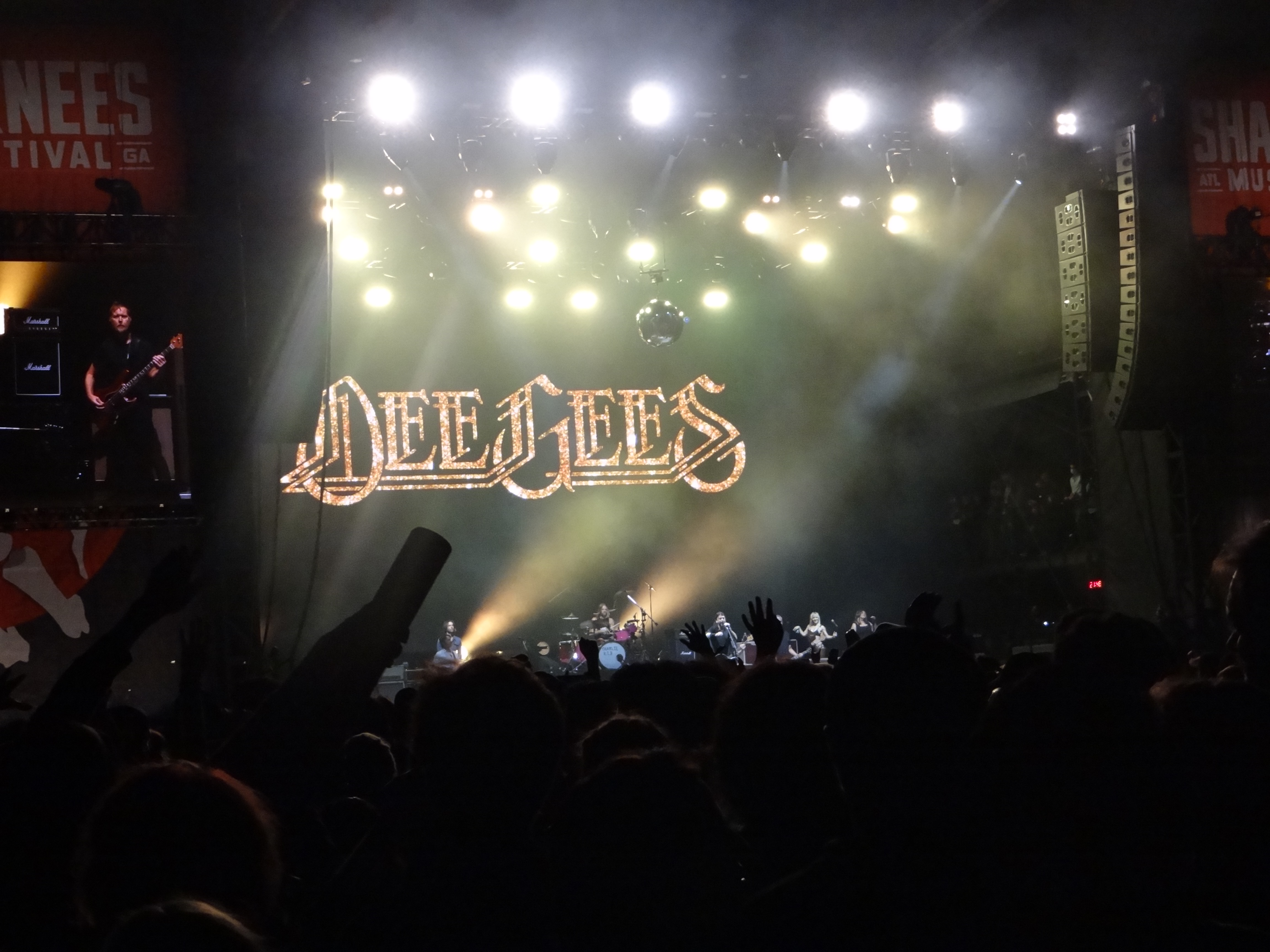
Foo Fighters performing as the Dee Gees at the 2021 Shaky Knees Music Festival

Foo Fighters previously performed Andy Gibb's 1978 song "Shadow Dancing" during Linda Perry's Rock 'n' Relief livestream and the Bee Gees' "You Should Be Dancing" on Jo Whiley's Sofa Session show on BBC Radio 2. Dave Grohl said about the recording of "You Should Be Dancing": "I have never, ever in my life sung like that, but it was the easiest song I have ever sung in my entire life! I sang the song, and it was like six minutes and I was done. I should have been singing like this for the last 25 years!"

== Track listing ==
Side A
No.	Title	Writer(s)	Length
1.	"You Should Be Dancing"	Barry Gibb; Robin Gibb; Maurice Gibb	3:53
2.	"Night Fever"	B. Gibb; R. Gibb; M. Gibb	3:33
3.	"Tragedy"	B. Gibb; R. Gibb; M. Gibb	4:46
4.	"Shadow Dancing"	B. Gibb; R. Gibb; M. Gibb; Andy Gibb	4:15
5.	"More Than a Woman"	B. Gibb; R. Gibb; M. Gibb	3:10

Side B
No.	Title	Writer(s)	Length
6.	"Making a Fire" (live)	Foo Fighters	4:12
7.	"Shame Shame" (live)	Foo Fighters	4:02
8.	"Waiting on a War" (live)	Foo Fighters	4:04
9.	"No Son of Mine" (live)	Foo Fighters	3:25
10.	"Cloudspotter" (live)	Foo Fighters	3:45
Total length:			39:05

== Personnel ==
Dee Gees/Foo Fighters

- Dave Grohl – lead vocals, guitar, backing vocals on "Shadow Dancing"
- Taylor Hawkins – drums, lead vocals on "Shadow Dancing"
- Nate Mendel – bass guitar
- Chris Shiflett – guitar
- Pat Smear – guitar
- Rami Jaffee – keyboards

Additional musicians

- Bobby Gruska
- Laura Mace
- Samantha Ridley
- Greg Kurstin (tracks 1–5)
- Violet Grohl (tracks 6–10)

Technical personnel

- Darrell Thorp – recording, mixing
- John Lousteau – recording assistance
- Oliver Roman – recording assistance
- Randy Merrill – mastering
- Morning Breath Inc. – art direction

== Charts ==
Chart performance for Hail Satin
Chart (2021)	Peak position
Australian Albums (ARIA)	31
Dutch Albums (Album Top 100)	18
Irish Albums (Official Charts)	27
Scottish Albums (Official Charts)	3
Spanish Albums (Promusicae)	61
UK Albums (Official Charts)	17
US Billboard 200	27
US Top Alternative Albums (Billboard)	3
US Top Rock Albums (Billboard)	5
