= The Essential Foo Fighters =

Greatest hits album by Foo Fighters
- Released: October 28, 2022
- Recorded: October 1994 – 2021
- Genre: Alternative rock; post-grunge; hard rock
- Length: 85:00
- Label: Legacy Recordings, Sony Music
- Producer: Foo Fighters; Gil Norton; Adam Kasper; Nick Raskulinecz; Barrett Jones; Butch Vig; Greg Kurstin

Foo Fighters chronology
Medicine at Midnight (2021)	The Essential Foo Fighters (2022)	But Here We Are (2023)

The Essential Foo Fighters is a greatest hits album released on October 28, 2022 by American rock band Foo Fighters. It is part of Sony Music's The Essential series. It was the first Foo Fighters release after the death of longtime drummer Taylor Hawkins on March 25, 2022.

== Reception ==
The album debuted at number eight on Billboard's Top Album Sales chart, making it the first in the Essential series to reach the top ten of that chart. It also debuted at number 42 on the Billboard 200. In a review by the German edition of Rolling Stone, Kristina Baum stated that "With a new hits compilation which now bears the more modest name The Essential, it becomes clear in 2022 what has happened in 13 more years of band history" and that in "12 to 15 years another Foo Fighters Best Of could probably be released without any problems. Could it still be the end of the Foo Fighters chapter due to the sad circumstances? It would be a shame". Baum also rated the album four out of five stars.

A review by Drew's Reviews stated that "I suspect The Essential Foo Fighters will sell well", but was critical that some tracks were omitted from the album: "Seriously, how do you leave out "Congregation" off Sonic Highways? In fact nothing off Sonic Highways. Weird." Drew's Reviews also noted that it is missing the song "Run" from the Concrete and Gold album which is only represented by one song, "The Sky Is a Neighborhood". A review by AllMusic was more positive stating that 13 years since the band's last Greatest Hits album Foo Fighters have had an additional four Top 10 albums which provide a "fair chunk" on The Essential Foo Fighters and that "The end result is that The Essential Foo Fighters winds up being a stronger comp than its predecessor".

== Track listing ==
The Essential Foo Fighters track listing
No.	Title	Writer(s)	Originally from	Length
1.	"Everlong"	Dave Grohl	The Colour and the Shape, 1997	4:10
2.	"Making a Fire"	Grohl; Taylor Hawkins; Rami Jaffee; Nate Mendel; Chris Shiflett; Pat Smear	Medicine at Midnight, 2021	4:15
3.	"Times Like These"	Grohl; Hawkins; Mendel; Shiflett	One by One, 2002	4:27
4.	"Rope"	Grohl; Hawkins; Mendel; Shiflett; Smear	Wasting Light, 2011	4:19
5.	"Monkey Wrench"	Grohl; Mendel; Smear	The Colour and the Shape	3:52
6.	"My Hero"	Grohl; Mendel; Smear	The Colour and the Shape	4:20
7.	"Cold Day in the Sun"	Hawkins	In Your Honor, 2005	3:28
8.	"Big Me"	Grohl	Foo Fighters, 1995	2:12
9.	"Long Road to Ruin"	Grohl; Hawkins; Mendel; Shiflett	Echoes, Silence, Patience & Grace, 2007	3:46
10.	"Shame Shame"	Grohl; Hawkins; Jaffee; Mendel; Shiflett; Smear	Medicine at Midnight	4:17
11.	"Best of You"	Grohl; Hawkins; Mendel; Shiflett	In Your Honor	4:16
12.	"All My Life"	Grohl; Hawkins; Mendel; Shiflett	One by One	4:24
13.	"The Pretender"	Grohl; Hawkins; Mendel; Shiflett	Echoes, Silence, Patience & Grace	4:27
14.	"This Is a Call"	Grohl	Foo Fighters	3:54
15.	"Waiting on a War" (not included on CD version)	Grohl; Hawkins; Jaffee; Mendel; Shiflett; Smear	Medicine at Midnight	4:13
16.	"Walk"	Grohl; Hawkins; Mendel; Shiflett; Smear	Wasting Light	4:17
17.	"Learn to Fly"	Grohl; Mendel; Hawkins	There Is Nothing Left to Lose, 1999	3:56
18.	"The Sky Is a Neighborhood"	Grohl; Hawkins; Mendel; Shiflett; Smear	Concrete and Gold, 2017	4:05
19.	"Breakout" (not included on CD version)	Grohl; Mendel; Hawkins	There Is Nothing Left to Lose	3:22
20.	"These Days"	Grohl; Hawkins; Mendel; Shiflett; Smear	Wasting Light	4:58
21.	"Everlong" (acoustic version)	Grohl	Greatest Hits, 2009	4:12
Total length:				85:00

== Personnel ==
Foo Fighters

- Dave Grohl – vocals, guitar, drums, bass
- Taylor Hawkins – drums; backing vocals (tracks 4, 18), lead vocals and tambourine (track 7)
- Rami Jaffee – keyboards
- Nate Mendel – bass
- Chris Shiflett – guitar
- Pat Smear – guitar

Additional musicians

- Louise Post – backing vocals (track 1)
- Nick Raskulinecz – bass (track 7)
- Drew Hester – percussion (track 9)
- Oliver Allgood – lute (track 9)
- The Section Quartet – string section, arranged by Audrey Riley (track 13)
- Alison Mosshart – backing vocals (track 18)
- Rachel Grace – violin (track 18)
- Ginny Luke – violin (track 18)
- Thomas Lea – viola (track 18)
- Kings Bacik – cello (track 18)

Production

- Foo Fighters - producer
- Gil Norton – producer (tracks 1, 5, 6, 9, 13)
- Greg Kurstin – producer (tracks 2, 10, 15, 18)
- Nick Raskulinecz – producer (tracks 3, 7, 11, 12)
- Butch Vig – producer (tracks 4, 16, 20)
- Barrett Jones – producer (tracks 8, 14)
- Adam Kasper – producer (tracks 17, 19)
- Randy Merrill – mastering at Sterling Sound

== Charts ==
=== Weekly charts ===
Weekly chart performance for The Essential Foo Fighters
Chart (2022–2024)	Peak position
Australian Albums (ARIA)	5
Austrian Albums (Ö3 Austria)	19
Belgian Albums (Ultratop Flanders)	24
Belgian Albums (Ultratop Wallonia)	101
Canadian Albums (Billboard)	43
Dutch Albums (Album Top 100)	88
German Albums (Offizielle Top 100)	20
Irish Albums (IRMA)	19
New Zealand Albums (RMNZ)	1
Portuguese Albums (AFP)	10
Scottish Albums (OCC)	8
Spanish Albums (Promusicae)	29
Swiss Albums (Schweizer Hitparade)	37
UK Albums (OCC)	10
UK Rock & Metal Albums (OCC)	2
US Billboard 200	42
US Top Alternative Albums (Billboard)	4
US Top Rock Albums (Billboard)	8

=== Year-end charts ===
2023 year-end chart performance for The Essential Foo Fighters
Chart (2023)	Position
Australian Albums (ARIA)	21
UK Albums (OCC)	50
US Top Rock Albums (Billboard)	21

2024 year-end chart performance for The Essential Foo Fighters
Chart (2024)	Position
Australian Albums (ARIA)	32
New Zealand Albums (RMNZ)	34
UK Albums (OCC)	60

2025 year-end chart performance for The Essential Foo Fighters
Chart (2025)	Position
Australian Albums (ARIA)	64
UK Albums (OCC)	98

== Certifications ==
Region	Certification	Certified units/sales
New Zealand (RMNZ)	2× Platinum	30,000^{‡}
United Kingdom (BPI)	Platinum	300,000^{‡}
^{‡} Sales+streaming figures based on certification alone.
