= Brit Awards 2018 =

British music awards ceremony

- Date: 21 February 2018
- Venue: The O2 Arena
- Hosted by: Jack Whitehall; Emma Willis (BRITs Are Coming Nominations Launch Show)

Highlights
- Most awards: Dua Lipa and Stormzy (2)
- Most nominations: Dua Lipa (5)

Television/radio coverage
- Network: ITV; ITV2 (Red Carpet); YouTube
- Runtime: 113 minutes
- Viewership: 4.5 million

Brit Awards 2018 was the 38th edition of the British Phonographic Industry's annual pop music show, the Brit Awards. It was held on the 21st February 2018 at the O2 Arena in London, with Jack Whitehall as the host. The Brit Award statuette designed by sculptor Sir Anish Kapoor was awarded to the winners. Foo Fighters, Dua Lipa and Ed Sheeran were among the global stars nominated for awards in the ceremony.

== Performances ==
Ariana Grande was scheduled to perform a tribute, in remembrance of those who lost their lives at the Manchester Arena Bombing, but later withdrew due to illness. Liam Gallagher instead, stood in for Grande, performing "Live Forever".

=== Pre-ceremony ===
Performer(s)	Song	UK Singles Chart reaction (week ending 25 January 2018)	UK Albums Chart reaction (week ending 25 January 2018)
Paloma Faith	"Crybaby"	N/A	The Architect – 11 (−2)
Clean Bandit; Julia Michaels	"Symphony" "I Miss You"	41 (−5); 4 (+1)	N/A
J Hus	"Did You See"	N/A	Common Sense – 24 (+11)
Liam Payne	"Strip That Down"	N/A	N/A
Jorja Smith; Stormzy	"Let Me Down"	34 (debut)	N/A; Gang Signs & Prayer – 33 (−5)

=== Main show ===
Performer(s)	Song	UK Singles Chart reaction (week ending 1 March 2018)	UK Albums Chart reaction (week ending 1 March 2018)
Justin Timberlake; Chris Stapleton	"Midnight Summer Jam" "Say Something"	N/A; 22 (+5)	Man of the Woods – 7 (+1)
Rag'n'Bone Man; Jorja Smith	"Skin"	N/A	Human – 4 (+8)
Dua Lipa	"New Rules"	31 (+3)	Dua Lipa – 3 (+8)
Ed Sheeran	"Supermarket Flowers"	81 (re-entry)	÷ – 2 (+/−) x – 13 (+4) + – 32 (+6)
Foo Fighters	"The Sky Is a Neighborhood"	N/A	Greatest Hits – 36 (+17); Concrete and Gold – 87 (re-entry)
Liam Gallagher	"Live Forever"	N/A	As You Were – 17 (+7)
Sam Smith	"Too Good at Goodbyes"	69 (+15)	The Thrill of It All – 11 (−2); In the Lonely Hour – 31 (+1)
Kendrick Lamar; Rich the Kid	"Feel" "New Freezer"	N/A	Damn – 14 (+7); Good Kid, M.A.A.D City – 79 (−3)
Rita Ora; Liam Payne	"Your Song" "Anywhere" "For You"	N/A; 34 (−3); 8 (+/−)	N/A
Stormzy	"Blinded by Your Grace, Pt. 2" Brits Freestyle "Big for Your Boots"	48 (+24); N/A	Gang Signs & Prayer – 10 (+31)

== Winners and nominees ==
The nominations were revealed on 13 January 2018.

British Album of the Year (presented by Nile Rodgers)	Special Achievement Award
Stormzy – Gang Signs & Prayer; Dua Lipa – Dua Lipa; Ed Sheeran – ÷; J Hus – Common Sense; Rag'n'Bone Man – Human	British Producer of the Year: Steve Mac (presented by Ed Sheeran); Global Success Award: Ed Sheeran (presented by Elton John and Ronnie Wood)
British Single of the Year (presented by Dermot O'Leary and Emma Willis)	British Video of the Year (presented by Jennifer Hudson, Olly Murs and Tom Jones)
Rag'n'Bone Man – "Human"; Calvin Harris featuring Pharrell Williams, Katy Perry and Big Sean – "Feels"; Clean Bandit featuring Zara Larsson – "Symphony"; Dua Lipa – "New Rules"; Ed Sheeran – "Shape of You"; J Hus – "Did You See"; Jax Jones featuring Raye – "You Don't Know Me"; Jonas Blue featuring William Singe – "Mama"; Liam Payne featuring Quavo – "Strip That Down"; Little Mix – "Touch"	Harry Styles – "Sign of the Times"; Ed Sheeran – "Shape of You"; Little Mix – "Touch"; Liam Payne featuring Quavo – "Strip That Down"; Zayn and Taylor Swift – "I Don't Wanna Live Forever" Eliminated; Anne-Marie – "Ciao Adios"; Calvin Harris featuring Pharrell Williams, Katy Perry and Big Sean – "Feels"; Clean Bandit featuring Zara Larsson – "Symphony"; Dua Lipa – "New Rules"; Jonas Blue featuring William Singe – "Mama"
British Male Solo Artist (presented by Little Mix)	British Female Solo Artist (presented by Kylie Minogue and Millie Bobby Brown)
Stormzy; Ed Sheeran; Liam Gallagher; Loyle Carner; Rag'n'Bone Man	Dua Lipa; Jessie Ware; Kae Tempest; Laura Marling; Paloma Faith
British Group (presented by Hailey Baldwin and Luke Evans)	British Breakthrough Act (presented by Alice Levine and Clara Amfo)
Gorillaz; London Grammar; Royal Blood; Wolf Alice; The xx	Dua Lipa; Dave; J Hus; Loyle Carner; Sampha
International Male Solo Artist (presented by Camila Cabello and Harry Kane)	International Female Solo Artist (presented by Adwoa Aboah and Ellie Goulding)
Kendrick Lamar; Beck; Childish Gambino; DJ Khaled; Drake	Lorde; Alicia Keys; Björk; Pink; Taylor Swift
International Group (presented by Anna Friel and Damian Lewis)	Critics' Choice Award (presented by Rag'n'Bone Man)
Foo Fighters; Arcade Fire; Haim; The Killers; LCD Soundsystem	Jorja Smith; Mabel; Stefflon Don

== Multiple nominations and awards ==
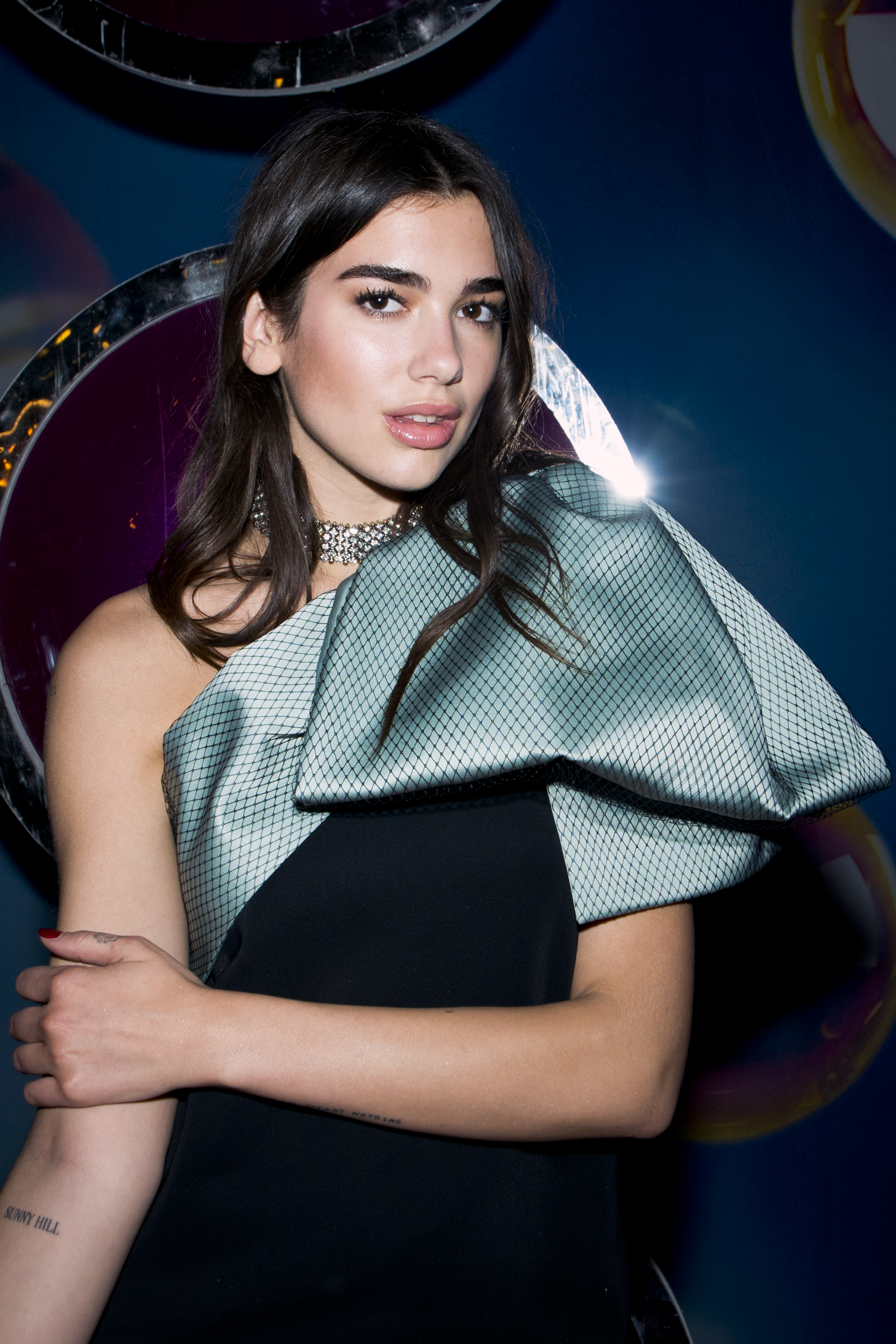
Two-time winner Dua Lipa earned the most nominations and awards

Artists who received multiple nominations
Nominations	Artist
5	Dua Lipa
4	Ed Sheeran
3	J Hus
3	Rag'n'Bone Man
2	Big Sean
2	Calvin Harris
2	Clean Bandit
2	Jonas Blue
2	Katy Perry
2	Liam Payne
2	Little Mix
2	Loyle Carner
2	Pharrell Williams
2	Quavo
2	Stormzy
2	Taylor Swift
2	William Singe
2	Zara Larsson

Artists who received multiple awards
Wins	Artist
2	Dua Lipa
2	Stormzy

== Brit Awards 2018 album ==
Brit Awards 2018

Compilation album / Box set by Various Artists
- Released: 9 February 2018
- Label: Sony Music Entertainment

Various Artists chronology
Brit Awards 2017 (2017)	''Brit Awards 2018'' (2018)

The Brit Awards 2018 is a compilation and box set which has two discs with a total of forty songs.

=== Track listing ===
==== CD 1 ====
No.	Title	Artist(s)	Length
1.	"Galway Girl"	Ed Sheeran	2:49
2.	"Human"	Rag'n'Bone Man	3:18
3.	"What About Us"	Pink	4:29
4.	"Too Good at Goodbyes"	Sam Smith	3:22
5.	"Reggaetón Lento"	CNCO and Little Mix	3:07
6.	"Havana"	Camila Cabello featuring Young Thug	3:35
7.	"New Rules"	Dua Lipa	3:30
8.	"Crybaby"	Paloma Faith	3:53
9.	"Ciao Adios"	Anne-Marie	3:21
10.	"Dusk Till Dawn"	Zayn featuring Sia	3:56
11.	"Big for Your Boots"	Stormzy	4:01
12.	"Did You See"	J Hus	3:03
13.	"Teenage Fantasy"	Jorja Smith	3:48
14.	"No Words"	Dave featuring MoStack	3:31
15.	"The Isle of Arran"	Loyle Carner	3:34
16.	"Feels"	Calvin Harris featuring Pharrell Williams, Katy Perry and Big Sean	3:43
17.	"(No One Knows Me) Like the Piano"	Sampha	3:37
18.	"Strip That Down"	Liam Payne featuring Quavo	3:23
19.	"I'm the One"	DJ Khaled featuring Justin Bieber, Quavo, Chance the Rapper and Lil Wayne	4:47
20.	"Unforgettable"	French Montana featuring Swae Lee	3:51

==== CD 2 ====
No.	Title	Artist(s)	Length
1.	"Run"	Foo Fighters	5:25
2.	"Wall of Glass"	Liam Gallagher	3:44
3.	"Sign of the Times"	Harry Styles	4:08
4.	"Get Out of Your Own Way"	U2	3:58
5.	"Everything Now"	Arcade Fire	5:04
6.	"Lights Out"	Royal Blood	3:57
7.	"Saturnz Barz"	Gorillaz featuring Popcaan	3:02
8.	"Holy Mountain"	Noel Gallagher's High Flying Birds	3:56
9.	"Oh Woman Oh Man"	London Grammar	4:36
10.	"I Dare You"	The xx	3:53
11.	"Something Just like This"	The Chainsmokers and Coldplay	4:05
12.	"Rain"	The Script	3:28
13.	"Came Here for Love"	Sigala and Ella Eyre	3:22
14.	"Power"	Little Mix featuring Stormzy	4:02
15.	"Symphony"	Clean Bandit featuring Zara Larsson	3:32
16.	"Mama"	Jonas Blue featuring William Singe	3:01
17.	"Back to You"	Louis Tomlinson featuring Bebe Rexha and Digital Farm Animals	3:09
18.	"One Last Time"	Ariana Grande	3:15
19.	"Alone"	Jessie Ware	3:38
20.	"In Common"	Alicia Keys	3:29

== British Video of the Year controversy ==
The 2018 ceremony garnered controversy when Harry Styles was announced as the winner of the British Video of the Year. The official Brits leaderboard for these votes showed Little Mix consistently maintaining the number one spot each week, followed by Styles at number two. During the final voting event on the night of the ceremony Little Mix and Styles alternated between the top spot on numerous occasions. The last leader-board update placed Little Mix at the top spot, with Styles at number two. After the announcement of Styles as a winner, the Brit Awards were accused by Little Mix fans of rigging the votes for this category. The Brits responded to the claim, saying: "The final leader-board was displayed on The BRITs website prior to the final count being checked and verified independently by the Electoral Reform Services, the company that independently run all BRITs voting processes. The leader-board doesn’t work in real time and the vote was incredibly tight at the top. Fans can have complete confidence in the BRITs public vote." The Electoral Reform Services added: "Robust vote-counting rules and filters are in place which are in accordance with ITV's voting regulations, and agreed and tested prior to any vote taking place. We are confident that the vote integrity has not been compromised."
