= The Line (Foo Fighters song) =

2018 single by Foo Fighters

Single by Foo Fighters

from the album Concrete and Gold
- Released: May 1, 2018
- Recorded: 2017
- Studio: EastWest, Hollywood, California
- Genre: Rock
- Length: 3:38
- Label: RCA, Roswell
- Songwriters: Dave Grohl; Taylor Hawkins; Nate Mendel; Chris Shiflett; Pat Smear; Rami Jaffee
- Producers: Foo Fighters; Greg Kurstin

Foo Fighters singles chronology
"The Sky Is a Neighborhood" (2017)	"The Line" (2018)	"Shame Shame" (2020)

"The Line" is a song by American rock band Foo Fighters. The song is from the band's ninth studio album Concrete and Gold (2017), being released as a promotional song a week in advance of the album's release. It was released as the album's third single on May 1, 2018, after "Run" and "The Sky Is a Neighborhood".

== Background ==
"The Line" is a song from the Foo Fighters ninth studio album Concrete and Gold, and was the third song released ahead of the album's release, after Run" and "The Sky is a Neighborhood". It was released on September 7, 2017, some journalists describing it as a single, and others just describing it as a promotional song. The song was both released for music streaming, and released as an instant grat download - allowing a person who pre-ordered the album, to instantly receive the song prior to the album's release. In October 2017, the song was featured in commercials for TBS's post-season Major League Baseball coverage. On May 1, 2018, the song was released as the album's third single.

== Themes and composition ==
Grohl explained the meaning of the title, stating that it is about "a search for hope in this day and age where you feel as if you're fighting for your life with every passing moment, and everything is on the line." Instrumentally, Rolling Stone described the track as a "raucous yet melodic rocker with colossal guitars and pounding drums that drive forward while lighter, pop-tinged instrumental touches swirl underneath." Many journalists noted the high energy of the song, with Blabbermouth noting its "propulsive melody" with "heartfelt lyrics" and a "rousing chorus", and NME describing it as "blistering" and "euphoric". Team Rock/Classic Rock Magazine described the track as having a huge sound that would go over well in large arenas and music festivals.

== Reception ==
In a dedicated review of the song, Vulture praised the song as likely to be a standout track of the album, and describing the song as "blue chip" rock" and "a perennial sound you can set your clock by...huge guitars and winsome harmonies....all held together by a tone best described as openhearted and full-throated. Rolling Stone praised Grohl's powerful vocal performance in the song, specifically of the lines "The tears in your eyes/ Someday will dry/ We fight for our lives/ Because everything's on the line/ This time". Consequence of Sound was far more negative of the track, ranking it the third worst Foo Fighter song of all time, 135th out of 137 songs, calling it "big and plodding", and ultimately concluding that it sounded out of place compared to the rest of the album. Conversely, DIY Magazine described it as "pretty much everything you'd want from a song by Dave Grohl and co – driving, propulsive and dramatic, it combines light and dark into a potent melting pot."

== Personnel ==
Foo Fighters

- Dave Grohl – lead vocal, guitar
- Taylor Hawkins – drums, background vocals
- Nate Mendel – bass
- Chris Shiflett – guitar
- Pat Smear – guitar
- Rami Jaffee – Mellotron, piano, B3 organ

Other musicians

- Greg Kurstin – bass synth, vibraphone
- Jessy Greene – violin

== Charts ==
Chart (2017–2018)	Peak position
Belgium (Ultratip Bubbling Under Flanders)	47
Canadian All-format Airplay (Billboard)	50
Canada Rock (Billboard)	1
Czech Republic Modern Rock (IFPI)	14
UK Rock & Metal (Official Charts)	7
US Hot Rock & Alternative Songs (Billboard)	41
US Rock & Alternative Airplay (Billboard)	19
