= 'Til I'm Done =

2018 single by Paloma Faith

Single by Paloma Faith

from the album The Architect
- Released: 16 February 2018
- Genre: Disco-funk
- Length: 3:44
- Label: RCA; Sony UK
- Songwriter(s): Paloma Faith; Ben Kohn; John Newman; Peter Kelleher; Wayne Hector; Thomas Barnes
- Producer(s): Jesse Shatkin

Paloma Faith singles chronology
"Guilty" (2017)	"'Til I'm Done" (2018)	"Lullaby" (2018)

Music video
- "'Til I'm Done" on YouTube

"'Til I'm Done" is a song by English singer-songwriter Paloma Faith. It was released on 16 February 2018 as the third single from her fourth studio album The Architect (2017).

== Background and composition ==
Faith released "Til I'm Done" on 16 February 2014, following the singles "Guilty" and "Crybaby". Produced by TMS, the song is a disco-funk track. Faith described it as a more modern direction compared to her previous work, reflecting her focus on the future and personal growth influenced by motherhood, combining elements of both past and contemporary styles.

== Music video ==
The video for "'Til I'm Done" was filmed in a desert setting, with visuals that some have compared to Lady Gaga's style. A remix of the song by Jon Pleased Wimmin was also released, offering a more upbeat interpretation of the track. It was directed by Thomas Jones.

== Track listing ==
'Til I'm Done - Remixes EP

1. "'Til I'm Done" (KDA Remix) [Radio Edit] – 4:01
2. "'Til I'm Done" (Matrix & Futurebound Remix) [Radio Edit] – 3:55
3. "'Til I'm Done" (John Pleased Wimmin Full Vocal) [Club Mix] – 5:26
4. "'Til I'm Done" (John Pleased Wimmin Full Vocal) [Radio Edit] – 4:06
5. "'Til I'm Done" (John Pleased Wimmin) [Dub] – 5:58

== Critical reception ==
The Guardian highlighted its disco elements and described the track as "fun".

== Charts ==
"'Till I'm Done" chart performance
Chart (2018)	Peak position
UK Singles (OCC)	95
