= Guilty (Paloma Faith song) =

Single by Paloma Faith

from the album The Architect
- Released: 26 October 2017
- Length: 4:19
- Label: RCA; Sony UK
- Songwriter(s): Paloma Faith; Thomas Barnes; Peter Kelleher; Benjamin Kohn; Wayne Hector; Ella Henderson
- Producer(s): TMS

Paloma Faith singles chronology
| "Crybaby" (2017) | "Guilty" (2017) | "'Til I'm Done" (2018) |

Music video
- "Guilty" on YouTube

"Guilty" is a song by English singer-songwriter Paloma Faith. It was released on 26 October 2017 as the second single from her fourth studio album The Architect (2017).

== Background ==
Faith released "Guilty" as the second single from her fourth studio album The Architect, following "Crybaby" earlier in 2017. She returned to recording after a three-year break to give birth and raise her daughter. Faith revealed that she wrote the song during the week of the Brexit referendum, taking the perspective of a Leave voter who regretted their decision. She explained that she aimed to show empathy for those who felt misled by the campaign and the lack of information, giving lyrics such as "I've been a criminal, I made a mistake, Believed in the fictional, then let everything slip away" an added significance.

== Composition ==
"Guilty" was written in response to the Brexit vote, reflecting on themes of regret and responsibility. According to MXDWN, the track features Faith's deep alto vocals set against sweeping strings, creating a dramatic and soulful atmosphere with R&B influences.

== Critical reception ==
The Guardian noted that while "Guilty" carried the cinematic qualities of a Bond theme, it felt reminiscent of material Faith had previously released. The review suggested that the single did not significantly depart from her established sound, though it retained her signature dramatic style and vocal delivery. The Independent called "Guilty" "one of her strongest tracks from last year's comeback and perhaps career-best album The Architect".

== Charts ==
"Guilty" chart performance
| Chart (2017) | Peak position |
|---|---|
| UK Singles Sales (OCC) | 57 |
| UK Singles Downloads (OCC) | 57 |
