= Saint Cecilia (song) =

Single by Foo Fighters

from the EP Saint Cecilia
- Released: November 23, 2015
- Recorded: October 2015
- Studio: Saint Cecelia Hotel, Austin, Texas
- Genre: Rock
- Length: 3:42
- Label: RCA
- Songwriters: Dave Grohl; Taylor Hawkins; Nate Mendel; Chris Shiflett; Pat Smear

Foo Fighters singles chronology
"I Am a River" (2015)	"Saint Cecilia" (2015)	"Run" (2017)

"Saint Cecilia" is a single by American rock band Foo Fighters, from their EP Saint Cecilia. It peaked at No. 3 on the Billboard Mainstream Rock chart in 2016.

== Background and recording ==
The song was first released as a track on Saint Cecilia, a free EP released by the Foo Fighters as a dedication to the victims of the November 2015 Paris Attacks. The song features background vocals by Ben Kweller. The performance was by chance, with Kweller literally passing by the hotel where the band was recording the song. The situation was outlined by Grohl in an October 2015 live performance, prior to the song's release, and then again, with the song's final release:

Weekend two was spent recording vocals and guitars in my bedroom, room 4. More friends, more margaritas, a fire in the fire pit. At one point, a familiar face walked in and said, 'Dave.....it’s Ben Kweller.....' It had been years! Such a talented young man. We hugged, hit play to listen to the last vocal take, and he instinctively started singing the perfect harmony to my line. Without hesitation, I immediately said, 'Get your ass in there and sing it right now.' So he picked up the coffee stained piece of hotel stationary with my lyrics penciled on it and banged out his part in two glorious takes. Always record, ladies and gentlemen. Always record. The night faded, friends and family scattered, and I fell asleep with my still glowing amp at the foot of my bed.

The song was released to rock radio, where it peaked at number 3 on the Billboard Mainstream Rock Songs In January 2016, "Saint Cecilia" became the band's twenty-second song to make to the Top 10 on the US Mainstream Rock Tracks chart, tying them with Godsmack for the most Top 10 placements on the chart since August 1995 when Foo Fighters had their first Top 10 with "This Is a Call". Similarly, it was their twenty-ninth song to reach the Alternative Songs Top 20, tying the band with the Red Hot Chili Peppers for second-most top 20 entries in the chart's history, behind U2.

== Themes and composition ==
Pitchfork described the song as having a "robust chorus built on a progression of straight-strummed barre chords, stacked harmonies and broad lyrics that express a general sense of yearning, including lines such as "Days will come and go/No matter what I say/Nothing's set in stone/No matter what I say".

== Reception and impact ==
Pitchfork praised the song for being "the most immediately pleasing thing they've done this decade and also the most instantly familiar" and favorably compared to past melodic singles "Learn to Fly", "Times Like These", and "Next Year". Consequence of Sound praised the song for being different from the songs from the band's prior album, Sonic Highways, stating that it "shatters the proverbial cast and shrugs off the last few years with stony assurance and a youthful grin...Listen close enough and you’ll hear about three to four hooks going on at once. The doubled Grohl harmonies could be construed as overkill, but it’s driving too fast to sound any alarms."

Fabio Zaffagnini of "Rocking 1000", the group that had previously organized 1,000 people to sing the Foo Fighters song "Learn to Fly" in efforts to persuade the band to play a concert in Cesena, Italy, organized a second project with "Saint Cecilia". Zaffagnini sent out a request for over 1,000 musicians to record vocals and/or instrumental parts of the song, and pieced parts of everyone's performances together into one collective piece. The project was meant to be a counterpoint to the argument that "rock music is dead".

== Personnel ==
Personnel taken from Saint Cecilia EP liner notes.

Foo Fighters

- Dave Grohl – guitars, vocals, percussion
- Pat Smear – guitar
- Chris Shiflett – guitar
- Nate Mendel – bass guitar
- Taylor Hawkins – drums
- Rami Jaffee – keyboards

Additional musicians

- Ben Kweller – background vocals

== Charts ==
=== Weekly charts ===
Chart (2015–16)	Peak position
Belgium (Ultratip Bubbling Under Flanders)	32
Canada Rock (Billboard)	2
Czech Republic Modern Rock (IFPI)	3
Finland Airplay (Radiosoittolista)	82
Spain Physical Singles (PROMUSICAE)	1
UK Rock & Metal (Official Charts)	12
US Hot Rock & Alternative Songs (Billboard)	33
US Rock & Alternative Airplay (Billboard)	6

=== Year-end charts ===
Chart (2016)	Position
US Hot Rock Songs (Billboard)	96
US Rock Airplay (Billboard)	28
