= Saint Cecilia (EP) =

- 12" vinyl cover

EP by Foo Fighters
- Released: November 23, 2015
- Recorded: October 1–11, 2015
- Studios: Hotel Saint Cecilia in Austin, Texas; Studio 606
- Genres: Punk rock; alternative rock
- Length: 18:00
- Label: RCA

Foo Fighters chronology
Songs from the Laundry Room (2015)	Saint Cecilia (2015)	Concrete and Gold (2017)

Singles from Saint Cecilia
- 1. "Saint Cecilia" Released: November 23, 2015

Saint Cecilia is an EP by American rock band Foo Fighters. It was released as a free digital download on November 23, 2015. Initially intended as a sign of gratitude to the group's fans, the EP was also dedicated to the victims of the terrorist attacks in Paris. A single from the EP, "Saint Cecilia", peaked at number 3 on the Billboard Mainstream Rock Songs chart in 2016. It is the first Foo Fighters release to credit long-time session and touring keyboardist Rami Jaffee as an official member.

== Background and recording ==
The five song EP was recorded in Austin, Texas, at the Saint Cecilia Hotel during the Austin City Limits festival's two weekends in October 2015. The EP was initially envisioned as a "end-of-the-tour" gift to fans to be given away towards the end of the band's Sonic Highways touring cycle. However, the events of the November 2015 Paris attacks ended up cutting the tour short. The band instead released the EP for free on the internet, on November 23, 2015, in dedication of the Paris attacks. The release, according to frontman Dave Grohl, is meant to "remind us that music is life". The name and release date have significance; Saint Cecilia is the patron saint of music, and November 22 is her respective feast day.

Recorded at the Hotel Saint Cecilia in Austin, Texas, Saint Cecilia was released on November 23. Many of the songs and song parts used in the EP are from unused songs left off past albums. The track "The Neverending Sigh" was originally known under the title "7 Corners", and was originally written alongside tracks for The Colour and the Shape.

Krist Novoselic, who had previously played with Grohl in Nirvana, described Saint Cecilia as Foo Fighters' "statement on how they are the biggest rock band in the world". Novoselic also said that "Saint Cecilia is more straight-ahead rock that is done really well", and went on to say that "I went to the Foo’s last gig at the Moda Center in Portland and they rocked a packed house. I love the drummer Matt Sorum. However, he is so wrong in his statement about danger and the Foo’s somehow lacking it. First off all, I know about danger in rock. I was the bassist in Flipper — and survived! Look at a band like Queen, who totally rocked. They were way more dandy than danger. Queen knows how to rock a stadium. So do the Foo Fighters and you’ll hear big rock on Saint Cecilia".

The vinyl version of the Saint Cecilia EP, featuring an alternative cover, was released on February 19, 2016.

== Reception ==
Professional ratings
Aggregate scores
Source	Rating
Metacritic	76/100
Review scores
Source	Rating
Allmusic	3.5/5 stars
Consequence of Sound	B+
Kerrang!	4/5 stars
NME	8/10
Pitchfork	6.0/10
Punknews	3.5/5 stars
Rolling Stone	3.5/5 stars
Spin	7/10
Sputnikmusic	3/5 stars

Saint Cecilia received generally positive reviews. In a review of the Saint Cecilia EP, NME stated that "Quite aside from the sad circumstances of its release, if 'Saint Cecilia' is foreshadowing the Foo Fighters' next move, the omens look good. Spin stated that "It's the one consistent blessing of stardom. With Saint Cecilia, the Foos are trying to acknowledge that blessing in the best way possible: being themselves".

Consequence of Sound stated that whereas last year's Sonic Highways album was arguably their weakest effort to date, "Saint Cecilia feels like a new turn, or rather, a much-needed step back. It’s simple, back-to-basics rock 'n' roll that reaches for the heart and not the last fan in the back of the crowd. Revisiting the past, Foo Fighters have always been at their best when they don’t overthink things and just be themselves — it’s why Grohl's 1995 debut will forever be the band's watermark, and why 2011's Wasting Light managed to be such a late-career gem. That's not to say that this EP checks into that upper echelon of Foo Fighters accomplishments, but it’s certainly cut from the same cloth. There’s an energy to these songs that feels very nostalgic".

Pitchfork also said of the other songs on the EP that "Whenever that reputation threatens to stick, Grohl always draws on a Northern Virginia upbringing that put him within driving distance of DC's hardcore scene. "Sean" and "Savior Breath" are punk Foo Fighters, or as punk as they can sound in 2015—infinitely more energetic than anything on Sonic Highways, but only incrementally edgier, Wasting Light without Butch Vig's glossy overlay".

== Commercial performance ==
The "Saint Cecilia" single marked Foo Fighters' 29th song to reach the Alternative Songs top 20, slotting the Foo Fighters into a tie with the Red Hot Chili Peppers for second-most top 20 entries in the chart's history. Only U2 has more, with 31. "Saint Cecilia" is also the Foo Fighters' 22nd song to make to the Top 10 on the US Mainstream Rock Tracks chart, in which they are tied with Godsmack for the most Top 10s on that chart since August 1995 when Foo Fighters had their first Top 10 with "This Is a Call". The song ultimately peaked at number 3 on the chart.

== Track listing ==
All tracks are written by Foo Fighters (Dave Grohl, Taylor Hawkins, Nate Mendel, Chris Shiflett, Pat Smear).

No.	Title	Length
1.	"Saint Cecilia"	3:41
2.	"Sean"	2:11
3.	"Savior Breath"	3:11
4.	"Iron Rooster"	4:11
5.	"The Neverending Sigh"	4:45
Total length:		18:00

== Personnel ==
Personnel taken from Saint Cecilia liner notes.

Foo Fighters

- Dave Grohl – guitar, vocals, percussion on "Saint Cecilia", piano on "Iron Rooster"
- Taylor Hawkins – drums, background vocals on "Sean" and "Iron Rooster", piano and percussion on "Iron Rooster"
- Nate Mendel – bass
- Chris Shiflett – guitar
- Pat Smear – guitar
- Rami Jaffee – keyboards on "Saint Cecilia", "Sean", and "The Neverending Sigh"

Additional musicians

- Ben Kweller – background vocals on "Saint Cecilia"
- John Lousteau – percussion on "Iron Rooster"

Production

- Kevin Szymanski – recording (all except "Iron Rooster")
- John Ross Silva – second engineer (all except "Iron Rooster")
- John Lousteau – recording for "Iron Rooster", mixing assistant
- James Brown – mixing
- Emily Lazar – mastering
- Chris Allgood – mastering assistant
- Xavier Schipani – cover art
- Sandra Luk – design

== Charts ==
=== Single ===
Chart (2015–16)	Peak position
Belgium (Ultratip Bubbling Under Flanders)	32
Canada Rock (Billboard)	2
Finland Airplay (Radiosoittolista)	82
Spain Physical Singles (PROMUSICAE)	1
UK Rock & Metal (Official Charts)	12
US Hot Rock & Alternative Songs (Billboard)	33
US Rock & Alternative Airplay (Billboard)	6
US Alternative Airplay (Billboard)	12
US Mainstream Rock (Billboard)	3

=== 12-inch EP ===
Chart (2016)	Peak position
Austrian Albums (Ö3 Austria)	63
Belgian Albums (Ultratop Flanders)	74
Scottish Albums (Official Charts)	20
UK Albums (Official Charts)	35
UK Vinyl Albums (OCC)	1
UK Physical Albums (OCC)	20
UK Album Sales (OCC)	26
US Billboard 200	117
US Top Rock Albums (Billboard)	16
US Top Hard Rock Albums (Billboard)	4
US Top Alternative Albums (Billboard)	12
US Indie Store Album Sales (Billboard)	9
US Album Sales (Physical) (Billboard)	54
US Vinyl Albums (Billboard)	2

== Certifications ==
Sales certifications for Saint Cecilia
Region	Certification	Certified units/sales
Brazil (Pro-Música Brasil)	Platinum	40,000^{‡}
^{‡} Sales+streaming figures based on certification alone.

== Notes ==
- Kreps, Daniel (November 23, 2015). "Foo Fighters Drop Surprise Free EP 'Saint Cecilia'". Rolling Stone.
- Beauchemin, Molly (November 23, 2015). "Foo Fighters Drop Saint Cecilia EP". Pitchfork Media.
- Young, Alex (November 23, 2015). "Foo Fighters release surprise new EP, Saint Cecilia, for free download". Consequence of Sound.
