= No Son of Mine (Foo Fighters song) =

- Promotional CD-R cover art

Single by Foo Fighters

from the album Medicine at Midnight
- Released: January 1, 2021
- Recorded: 2019–2020
- Studio: Unnamed house in Encino, Los Angeles
- Genre: Hard rock
- Length: 3:29
- Label: RCA; Roswell
- Songwriters: Dave Grohl; Taylor Hawkins; Nate Mendel; Chris Shiflett; Pat Smear; Rami Jaffee
- Producers: Foo Fighters; Greg Kurstin

Foo Fighters singles chronology
"Shame Shame" (2020)	"No Son of Mine" (2021)	"Waiting on a War" (2021)

Music video
- "No Son of Mine" on YouTube

"No Son of Mine" is a song by American rock band Foo Fighters. It was released as the second single from their tenth album Medicine at Midnight on January 1, 2021.

== Composition ==
NME stated that the song features nods to "Stone Cold Crazy" by Queen and "Ace of Spades" by Motörhead.

Foo Fighters bassist Nate Mendel said that recording was "challenging" for him as the band approached things differently by "constructing things from the ground up" as opposed to their usual method of "recording them more live to tape and just kind of sitting in a room and playing."

== Live performances ==
Along with single "Waiting on a War", Foo Fighters' first live performance of "No Son of Mine" was on Jimmy Kimmel Live! on January 14, 2021.

== Music video ==
A live performance combined with animation was used to make the music video for the song. The live footage was filmed by Danny Clinch and the animation was made by Bomper Studio.

== Charts ==
Chart (2021)	Peak position
Belgium (Ultratip Bubbling Under Flanders)	16
Canada Hot Digital Songs (Billboard)	49
Canada Rock (Billboard)	27
Czech Republic Modern Rock (IFPI)	10
New Zealand Hot Singles (RMNZ)	6
UK Singles Downloads (Official Charts)	51
UK Singles Sales (OCC)	51
UK Rock & Metal (Official Charts)	9
US Mainstream Rock (Billboard)	32
US Hot Rock & Alternative Songs (Billboard)	49
