= Medicine at Midnight =

Studio album by Foo Fighters
- Released: February 5, 2021
- Recorded: October 2019 – February 2020
- Studio: Unnamed house in Encino, Los Angeles
- Genres: Alternative rock; hard rock; pop rock; power pop; dance-rock
- Length: 36:35
- Labels: Roswell; RCA
- Producers: Foo Fighters; Greg Kurstin

Foo Fighters chronology
Foo Files (2019)	Medicine at Midnight (2021)	The Essential Foo Fighters (2022)

Singles from Medicine at Midnight
- 1. "Shame Shame" Released: November 7, 2020; 2. "No Son of Mine" Released: January 1, 2021; 3. "Waiting on a War" Released: January 14, 2021; 4. "Making a Fire" Released: June 8, 2021; 5. "Love Dies Young" Released: November 22, 2021

Medicine at Midnight is the tenth studio album by American rock band Foo Fighters. It was released through Roswell and RCA Records on February 5, 2021, after having its release be pushed out of 2020 due to the COVID-19 pandemic. Produced by Greg Kurstin and the band, the album shows a slight shift in the band's style, pairing their usual rock sound with elements of dance-rock and pop. It is the final Foo Fighters studio album to feature drummer Taylor Hawkins before his death the following year.

Five singles were released for the album: "Shame Shame" in November 2020, "No Son of Mine" on New Year's Day 2021, "Waiting on a War" in January 2021, "Making a Fire" in June 2021, and "Love Dies Young" in November 2021. The album received generally positive reviews from critics and earned three Grammy Awards: Best Rock Album, Best Rock Song (for "Waiting on a War") and Best Rock Performance (for "Making a Fire").

== Background and recording ==
After releasing their ninth studio album, Concrete and Gold, in 2017, and touring extensively behind it through much of 2018, the Foo Fighters announced they would be taking a break in October 2018, with frontman Dave Grohl stating that although they needed a rest, he already had some initial ideas for the band's next album. The break would last for less than a year, as by August 2019, drummer Taylor Hawkins reported that Grohl had already been demoing material by himself, and that the rest of the members planned to start contributing shortly thereafter. The band collectively started recording for the album in October 2019. The following month, Grohl described the band as being "right in the middle" of the recording process, and that the album was sounding "fucking weird".

The album was recorded in a large, old house from the 1940s in Encino, Los Angeles. Recording sessions proceeded quickly, something Grohl attributed two things – that the material was progressing quickly and that they were recording in an environment where strange things kept happening. Grohl recalled:

"I knew the vibes were definitely off, but the sound was fucking on. We would come back to the studio the next day and all of the guitars would be detuned. Or the setting we'd put on the [mixing] board, all of them had gone back to zero. We would open up a Pro Tools session and tracks would be missing. There were some tracks that were put on there that we didn't put on there. But just like weird open mic noises. Nobody playing an instrument or anything like that, just an open mic recording a room."

Grohl noted that they captured unexplainable footage on video, but due to a non-disclosure agreement with the house's owner, who was attempting to sell the property, the footage cannot be shown. The experiences would end serving as inspiration for a comedy horror film starring the Foo Fighters, Studio 666. Contrary to the Concrete and Gold sessions, which frequently ended in nights of large cookouts, drinking, and parties, the sessions were wrapped up as quickly as possible. In February 2020, Grohl confirmed that the album was finished.

== Composition and themes ==
Writers described the album's sound as alternative rock, hard rock, pop rock, power pop, and dance-rock. Grohl likened the album's sound to David Bowie's Let's Dance album, with him explaining that it's "not like a EDM, disco, [or] modern dance record" but rather "this really up, fun record" that is "filled with anthemic, huge, sing-along rock songs." Hawkins described the album as being more "pop-oriented" than prior releases, different from their usual post-grunge sound. He also noted the use of a drum loop on the album, another atypical trait for the band. The song "Cloudspotter" contains a guitar riff that Grohl wrote 25 years earlier in Seattle but was unable to work into a song previously. Grohl stated, "Some of those songs, the best ones happen in 45 minutes. Then there's other songs — there's a riff on the new record I’ve been working on for 25 years. The first time I demoed it was in my basement in Seattle." Grohl stated that the album's overall style was inspired by the Foo Fighters' "love of rock bands that make these upbeat, up-tempo, almost danceable records".

== Release and promotion ==
In February 2020, the band announced "The Van Tour 2020", a 25th-anniversary tour where the band would perform in all of the same cities as the band had twenty-five years prior in their first North American tour, only in larger venues. While the tour was originally scheduled to run in April and May 2020, the COVID-19 pandemic forced the band to delay the tour to October and December of the same year. In May 2020, the band announced that they had indefinitely delayed the album, while the band figures out how to promote and sell the album after the pandemic. While the initial delay was due to the pandemic and the band's inability to tour in support of it, Grohl later decided to release it during the pandemic anyhow, upon realizing its ability to be heard and lift people's spirits outweighed their desire to tour in support of it. (Note: Grohl said his online drum battle with 10-year-old musician Nandi Bushell was "the deciding factor": "this exchange that she and I were having did nothing but bring happiness and joy to people. I thought, 'That's done entirely remotely, so why can't our music do the same? Why can't we put the record out and hopefully it'll give people that same feeling? Why can't we do that now?' And so we did.") Anticipation remained high for the album; Kerrang! placed the album atop of their "15 Albums Still to Look Forward to in 2020" list.

Promotions picked back up again in November of the same year. The band announced they would perform on the November 7 episode of Saturday Night Live. Treading up to the performance, they started teasing new music snippets of a song on their social media platforms. On November 7, the band released the first single, "Shame Shame". On January 1, 2021, the band released the second single of the album, "No Son of Mine". On January 14, the band released the third single, "Waiting on a War".

In the United States, Medicine at Midnight debuted at number three on the Billboard 200 album chart which was earned by 70,000 equivalent album units, 64,000 of which were album sales, making it the top-selling album of the week.

== Critical reception ==
Professional ratings
Aggregate scores
Source	Rating
AnyDecentMusic?	7.0/10
Metacritic	75/100
Review scores
Source	Rating
AllMusic	4.5/5 stars
The Guardian	3/5 stars
The Independent	3/5 stars
Kerrang	4/5 stars
NME	4/5 stars
Pitchfork	4.7/10
PopMatters	7/10
Rolling Stone	4/5 stars

Medicine at Midnight received generally positive reviews from music critics. At Metacritic, which assigns a normalized rating out of 100 to reviews from professional publications, the release received an average score of 75, based on 22 reviews, indicating "generally favorable reviews". Stephen Thomas Erlewine of AllMusic praised Medicine at Midnight as "a speedy, hooky, and efficient record, every bit the party album Grohl promised." Rolling Stone's Kory Grow described the music as the band's "most upbeat" to date. James McMahon of NME gave further praise to the music, considering it a welcome addition to the band's catalog. He further named "Love Dies Young" as one of the band's best songs up to that point.

Other reviewers expressed more mixed assessments. The Guardian's Alexis Petridis found a lack of innovative music compared to its predecessors, stating that the new musical elements are "gentle nods towards an idea, scattered sparingly around an album that otherwise sounds exactly like Foo Fighters." He ultimately deduced the record as "a solid but unspectacular album" but nonetheless successful. Alexandra Pollard of The Independent also found the music lacking in innovation, calling it "a perfectly perfunctory addition to a canon of robust rock'n'roll". She felt that the album would satisfy the band's longtime fans and make welcome addition to their concert setlists. More negatively, Pitchfork's Jeremy D. Larson criticized Medicine at Midnight as "another album of inconsequential music", further noting that it "adds very little to [the band's] extensive catalog of interchangeable power pop and hard-rock sing-alongs".

It was elected by Loudwire as the 31st best rock/metal album of 2021.

== Commercial performance ==
In the United States, Medicine at Midnight debuted at number three on the Billboard 200 chart with 70,000 album-equivalent units, which consisted of 64,000 pure album copies. In United Kingdom, Medicine at Midnight debuted at number one on the UK Albums chart with 42,500 album-equivalent units sold.

== Track listing ==
All tracks are written by Foo Fighters.

No.	Title	Length
1.	"Making a Fire"	4:15
2.	"Shame Shame"	4:17
3.	"Cloudspotter"	3:53
4.	"Waiting on a War"	4:13
5.	"Medicine at Midnight"	3:30
6.	"No Son of Mine"	3:28
7.	"Holding Poison"	4:24
8.	"Chasing Birds"	4:12
9.	"Love Dies Young"	4:20
Total length:		36:35

== Personnel ==
Personnel taken from Medicine at Midnight liner notes. (Note: The band members' instruments are not credited in the album's liner notes. Their primary instruments are listed based on their de facto primary roles in the group.)

Foo Fighters

- Dave Grohl – vocals, guitar
- Taylor Hawkins – drums
- Nate Mendel – bass guitar
- Chris Shiflett – guitar
- Pat Smear – guitar
- Rami Jaffee – keyboards

Additional musicians

- Bobby Gruska – backing vocals
- Samantha Sidley – backing vocals
- Laura Mace – backing vocals
- Inara George – backing vocals
- Violet Grohl – backing vocals
- Omar Hakim – percussion
- Greg Kurstin – keyboard on "Love Dies Young", string arrangements on "Shame Shame" and "Waiting on a War"
- Songa Lee – violin on "Shame Shame" and "Waiting on a War"
- Charlie Bisharat – violin on "Shame Shame" and "Waiting on a War"
- Alma Fernandez – viola on "Shame Shame" and "Waiting on a War"
- Jacob Braun – cello on "Shame Shame"

Technical

- Greg Kurstin – production
- Foo Fighters – production
- Alex Pasco – production assistant
- Darrell Thorp – engineer
- Mark "Spike" Stent – mixing engineer
- Matt Wolach – mixing assistant
- Randy Merrill – mastering engineer
- Kel Lauren – graphic designer (album cover)

== Charts ==
=== Weekly charts ===
Weekly chart performance for Medicine at Midnight
Chart (2021)	Peak position
Australian Albums (ARIA)	1
Austrian Albums (Ö3 Austria)	1
Belgian Albums (Ultratop Flanders)	1
Belgian Albums (Ultratop Wallonia)	3
Canadian Albums (Billboard)	3
Croatian International Albums (HDU)	1
Czech Albums (ČNS IFPI)	7
Danish Albums (Hitlisten)	6
Dutch Albums (Album Top 100)	1
Finnish Albums (Suomen virallinen lista)	2
French Albums (SNEP)	16
German Albums (Offizielle Top 100)	1
Greek Albums (IFPI Greece)	4
Hungarian Albums (MAHASZ)	13
Irish Albums (Official Charts)	1
Italian Albums (FIMI)	2
Japanese Albums (Oricon)	11
Lithuanian Albums (AGATA)	46
New Zealand Albums (RMNZ)	1
Norwegian Albums (VG-lista)	4
Polish Albums (ZPAV)	6
Portuguese Albums (AFP)	1
Scottish Albums (Official Charts)	1
Spanish Albums (Promusicae)	3
Swedish Albums (Sverigetopplistan)	2
Swiss Albums (Schweizer Hitparade)	1
UK Albums (Official Charts)	1
UK Rock & Metal Albums (Official Charts)	1
US Billboard 200	3
US Top Rock Albums (Billboard)	1

=== Year-end charts ===
Year-end chart performance for Medicine at Midnight
Chart (2021)	Position
Australian Albums (ARIA)	68
Austrian Albums (Ö3 Austria)	51
Belgian Albums (Ultratop Flanders)	55
Belgian Albums (Ultratop Wallonia)	124
German Albums (Offizielle Top 100)	64
Portuguese Albums (AFP)	39
Swiss Albums (Schweizer Hitparade)	36
UK Albums (OCC)	56
US Top Album Sales (Billboard)	46
US Top Current Album Sales (Billboard)	24
US Top Rock Albums (Billboard)	56

== Certifications ==
Certifications for Medicine at Midnight
Region	Certification	Certified units/sales
United Kingdom (BPI)	Gold	100,000^{‡}
^{‡} Sales+streaming figures based on certification alone.

== See also ==
- Studio 666
