= The Architect (Paloma Faith album) =

2017 studio album by Paloma Faith

- Standard cover

Studio album by Paloma Faith
- Released: 17 November 2017
- Recorded: March 2015 – July 2017
- Genres: Pop; disco; R&B
- Length: 48:42
- Label: Sony UK
- Producers: Jesse Shatkin; Starsmith; TMS; Klas Åhlund; Eg White; Jay Reynolds; Sam Klempner; Jonathan Green; Ghostwriter; Samuel Dixon; Emre Ramazanoglu; Arnthor Birgisson; Jamie Hartman; Knox Brown; Thomas Brenneck; Homer Steinweiss

Paloma Faith chronology
A Perfect Contradiction (2014)	The Architect (2017)	Infinite Things (2020)

Singles from The Architect
- 1. "Crybaby" Released: 31 August 2017; 2. "Guilty" Released: 26 October 2017; 3. "'Til I'm Done" Released: 16 February 2018; 4. "Make Your Own Kind of Music" Released: 20 April 2018; 5. "Warrior" Released: 6 July 2018

The Architect is the fourth studio album by British singer Paloma Faith, released by Sony Music Entertainment on 17 November 2017. It features several singles, including "Crybaby", "Guilty", "'Til I'm Done", "Make Your Own Kind of Music", and "Warrior", and includes contributions from artists such as Starsmith, Sia, and Samuel L. Jackson.

The Architect is Faith's most commercially successful release to date. It debuted at number one on the UK Albums Chart with first-week sales of 40,000 copies, marking her first chart-topping album and the highest opening sales of her career. Despite its late release, the album ranked as the 14th best-selling album in the UK for 2017, with only P!nk outselling her among female solo artists that year. It continued its commercial success into 2018, remaining within the year's top 20 best-sellers and re-entering the UK Top 40 following the release of the Zeitgeist Edition in November 2018.

With The Architect, Faith became only the second woman—after Sade—to have all of her first four studio albums receive BPI Platinum certification. Critically, the album was well received, earning a Metacritic score of 72 based on mainstream reviews, with praise for its polished production and Faith's signature blend of pop, disco, and R&B.

== Background ==
"The Architect is a social observation record. I was adamant that I wouldn't write about love. I wanted to look outside of myself. I'm coming at politics from the perspective of the common man or woman, observing why people are suffering. Each song on the record is about a different pocket of the socio-political world that I've been delving into. I wanted to write something more modern. On previous albums I've been more concerned with the past, but now I'm looking forward because of motherhood and wanting to change things for a better future. It's a marriage of old and new."

In June 2015, during her Glastonbury Festival performance, Faith confirmed having started the process of creating her fourth studio album. "Now we're going to bring to your attention what I've been listening to a lot when making album number four," she told the crowd, before performing a cover of "Purple Haze" by Jimi Hendrix. In addition to the inspiration from Hendrix, Faith has also stated she has been listening to "a lot of psychedelic rock", including Janis Joplin. In another interview Faith stated she is very happy and hasn't "anything to moan about" in her current relationship, which led her to conclude that "there's a lot of things going on in the world that are [just] as important as love". As a result, Faith attempted to write songs which "aren't about love or heartache", something the singer found challenging. In a Facebook post dated 10 June 2016, Faith indicated that the new album would have a full orchestra on part of it, "composed by David Arnold".

On 22 August 2016, in a letter to fans (handwritten by Faith) was posted on her website, announcing that she was pregnant, after spending her "whole life" wanting to be a mother. The "Update" also says that, after working with the "amazing" Jesse Shatkin her fourth album would be entitled "The Architect" and released in 2017. After her maternity break, Faith said she would return "full of energy and excited to come and sing for you again".

== Release and promotion ==
=== Singles ===
Faith released the lead single from the album, "Crybaby" on 31 August 2017, in the process announcing the release date, before putting the album up for pre-order on 22 September 2017, along with the tracklisting and album artwork. The song was made available for streaming and download on 31 August 2017, written in collaboration with the producer Starsmith. She also confirmed a collaboration with actor Samuel L. Jackson. The song's dystopian-themed music video was directed by Thomas James, and was released on 22 September 2017 alongside the album pre-order and the release of tour dates for Faith's 2018 UK arena tour. The song peaked at number 36 on the UK Singles Chart. On 22 October, it was announced that "Guilty" would be the second single.

On 24 January, Faith announced through an Instagram post that "'Til I'm Done" would be released the following day as the third single from the recording; this information was later posted on different websites, in which it was stated that the single would impact radio stations on 16 February while a remix EP would be released on 2 February. Faith's cover of "Make Your Own Kind of Music" was announced in April 2018 to be included on the album's digital track listing, thus becoming its fourth official single. The song was included on the track listing on 20 April 2018, over a month after the cover's original release date. "Warrior" was released as the fifth single on 6 July 2018.

"Loyal" was released as the first single from the Zeitgeist Edition with an accompanying lyric video on 11 October 2018.

=== Tour ===
Faith announced a 2018 UK and Ireland arena tour in support of The Architect, set to kick off on March 2 in Leeds. The tour includes stops in major cities such as Glasgow, Manchester, London, and Dublin. Tickets went on sale on September 29 at 9am.

== Critical reception ==
The Architect ratings
Aggregate scores
Source	Rating
AnyDecentMusic?	6.1/10
Metacritic	72/100
Review scores
Source	Rating
AllMusic	4/5 stars
The Guardian	3/5 stars
The Irish Times	3/5 stars
NME	3/5 stars
The Times	3/5 stars

At Metacritic, which assigns a normalised rating out of 100 to reviews from mainstream critics, The Architect received an average score of 72 based on six reviews, indicating "generally favourable reviews".

Matt Collar of AllMusic described The Architect as a polished and emotionally resonant blend of pop, disco, and R&B that balances high-profile collaborations with Faith's distinctive artistic voice and socially conscious themes. Dave Simpson of The Guardian noted that while The Architect is presented by Faith as a "political with a small 'p'" album, much of it still plays like a retro soul-pop record focused on love and heartache, with socially conscious messages often coming across as vague or understated. Nick Levine of NME noted that despite Faith's political intent on the album, its glossy retro-pop sound and vague lyrics make it feel like a continuation of her previous work rather than a clear social commentary.

== Commercial performance ==
The Architect debuted at number one on the UK Albums Chart, selling 40,000 copies in its first week—marking Faith's highest first-week sales to date and securing her first UK chart-topping album by displacing Taylor Swift's Reputation. Despite its late November 2017 release, it was the 14th best-selling album of the year in the UK. Among female solo artists, only P!nk sold more albums that year, with Faith outselling Taylor Swift. The album remained commercially successful into the following year, ranking within 2018's Top 20 best-sellers to date.

The album also marked a significant career milestone, making Faith only the second woman—after Sade—to have all of her first four studio albums be BRIT Certified Platinum. Following the release of the Zeitgeist Edition in November 2018, The Architect re-entered the UK Albums Chart Top 40 at number twenty-two.

== Track listing ==
The Architect – Standard edition
No.	Title	Writer(s)	Producer(s)	Length
1.	"Evolution" (featuring Samuel L. Jackson)	Paloma Faith	Starsmith; Faith	1:04
2.	"The Architect"	Faith; Edward Harcourt-Smith	Jesse Shatkin; Faith	3:25
3.	"Guilty"	Faith; Thomas Barnes; Peter Kelleher; Benjamin Kohn; Wayne Hector; Ella Henderson	TMS; Sam Klempner^{[a]}	4:19
4.	"Crybaby"	Faith; Finlay Dow-Smith; Lindy Robbins; Cleo Tighe	Starsmith	3:53
5.	"I'll Be Gentle" (with John Legend)	Faith; Barnes; Kelleher; Kohn; Zak Zilesnick	Starsmith; Shatkin	4:15
6.	"Politics of Hope" (featuring Owen Jones)	Faith	Starsmith; Faith	0:54
7.	"Kings and Queens"	Faith; Cass Lowe; Jesse Shatkin	Shatkin	3:51
8.	"Surrender"	Faith; Jonathan Green; Jonny Harris; Rory Graham	Green; Ghostwriter; James Reynolds	3:33
9.	"Warrior"	Sia Furler; Samuel Dixon	Dixon; Shatkin; Emre Ramazanoglu	3:44
10.	"'Til I'm Done"	Faith; Barnes; Kelleher; Kohn; Hector; John Newman	Shatkin; TMS	3:44
11.	"Lost and Lonely"	Faith; Francis White	Eg White; Shatkin	3:41
12.	"Still Around"	Faith; Tobias Jesso Jr.; Christopher John Stracey	Starsmith; Klas Åhlund^{[a]}	3:47
13.	"Pawns" (featuring Baby N'Sola, Janelle Martin & Naomi Miller)	Faith	Starsmith; Faith	0:51
14.	"WW3"	Faith; Ilsey Juber; Shatkin	Shatkin	3:10
15.	"Love Me as I Am"	Faith; Arnthor Birgisson; Klas Ahlund; Carla Marie Williams; Simon Smith	Ahlund; Birgisson	4:31
Total length:				48:42

The Architect – Digital standard edition
No.	Title	Writer(s)	Length
16.	"Make Your Own Kind of Music"	Barry Mann; Cynthia Weil	2:43
Total length:			51:25

The Architect – Deluxe edition
No.	Title	Writer(s)	Producer(s)	Length
16.	"Power to the Peaceful"	Faith; Jamie Hartman	Hartman	3:18
17.	"Tonight's Not the Only Night"	Faith; White	White; Shatkin	3:47
18.	"My Body"	Faith; Dow-Smith; Knox Brown; Janee Bennett	Starsmith; Reynolds; Brown	3:48
19.	"Price of Fame"	Faith; Thomas Brenneck; Homer Steinweiss	Shatkin; Brenneck; Steinweiss	3:00
Total length:				62:35

The Architect – Digital deluxe edition
No.	Title	Writer(s)	Length
20.	"Make Your Own Kind of Music"	Barry Mann; Cynthia Weil	2:43
Total length:			65:18

The Architect: Zeitgeist Edition
No.	Title	Writer(s)	Producer(s)	Length
20.	"Loyal"	Faith; Jamie Miller; Jacob Manson; Max Wolfgang	Manson; Chris Loco	3:40
21.	"Final Breath"	Faith; Dow-Smith; Stephan Moccio; Clarence Coffee Jr.	Starsmith	3:12
22.	"Your Ex"	Faith; Philip Cook; Ella McMahon; Barnes; Kelleher; Kohn	TMS; Cook	3:36
23.	"Older"	Faith; Dow-Smith; Tighe	Starsmith	3:06
24.	"Make Your Own Kind of Music"	Barry Mann; Cynthia Weil	TMS; Chris Bishop; Kelpner; Cook; David Arnold	2:43
25.	"Lullaby" (with Sigala)	Faith; Jessica Glynne; Janée Bennett; Bruce Fielder; Andrew Bullimore; Josh Record	Joe Ashworth; Sigala; Joakim Jarl	3:24

=== Notes ===
- ^{^[a]} signifies an additional producer.
- ^{^[b]} signifies a co-producer.

== Charts ==
=== Weekly charts ===
The Architect weekly chart performance
Chart (2017)	Peak position
Australian Albums (ARIA)	57
Belgian Albums (Ultratop Flanders)	166
Irish Albums (IRMA)	18
New Zealand Heatseeker Albums (RMNZ)	5
Scottish Albums (Official Charts)	1
Scottish Albums (OCC) (Note: This is the chart of The Architect: Zeitgeist Edition.)	24
UK Albums (Official Charts)	1
UK Albums (OCC)	22
UK Album Downloads (Official Charts)	4
UK Digital Albums (OCC)	27

=== Year-end charts ===
The Architect year-end chart performance (2017)
Chart (2017)	Position
UK Albums (OCC)	14

The Architect year-end chart performance (2018)
Chart (2018)	Position
UK Albums (OCC)	17

== Certifications ==
The Architect certifications
Region	Certification	Certified units/sales
United Kingdom (BPI)	Platinum	450,000
