= Love Dies Young =

Single by Foo Fighters

from the album Medicine at Midnight
- Released: November 22, 2021
- Recorded: October 2019 – February 2020
- Studio: Unnamed house in Encino, Los Angeles
- Genre: Alternative rock; disco-rock; power pop
- Length: 4:21
- Label: RCA; Roswell
- Songwriters: Dave Grohl; Taylor Hawkins; Nate Mendel; Chris Shiflett; Pat Smear; Rami Jaffee
- Producers: Foo Fighters; Greg Kurstin

Foo Fighters singles chronology
"Making a Fire" (2021)	"Love Dies Young" (2021)	"Rescued" (2023)

Music video
- "Love Dies Young" on YouTube

"Love Dies Young" is a song by American rock band Foo Fighters. It was released as the fifth and final single from their tenth studio album, Medicine at Midnight, on November 22, 2021. It was the last single released during drummer Taylor Hawkins' lifetime.

== Music video ==
Directed by Dave Grohl, the music video depicts the band as synchronized swimmers with their faces deepfaked onto each swimmer. Their coach played by Jason Sudeikis begins with a 4 minute speech berating them before going out to perform for a group of judges in a competition. The end of the video pays homage to the Baby Ruth chocolate candybar incident from the film Caddyshack, in which the candybar is mistaken for floating feces.

== Charts ==
=== Weekly charts ===
Weekly chart performance for "Love Dies Young"
Chart (2021)	Peak position
Canada Rock (Billboard)	1
Czech Republic Modern Rock (IFPI)	3
UK Rock & Metal (Official Charts)	18
US Rock & Alternative Airplay (Billboard)	3

=== Year-end charts ===
Year-end chart performance for "Love Dies Young"
Chart (2022)	Position
US Rock Airplay (Billboard)	8
