= Waiting on a War =

Single by Foo Fighters

from the album Medicine at Midnight
- Released: January 14, 2021
- Recorded: 2019
- Studio: Unnamed house in Encino, Los Angeles
- Genre: Folk rock; pop rock; hard rock
- Length: 4:14
- Label: RCA
- Songwriters: Dave Grohl; Taylor Hawkins; Rami Jaffee; Nate Mendel; Chris Shiflett; Pat Smear
- Producers: Foo Fighters; Greg Kurstin

Foo Fighters singles chronology
"No Son of Mine" (2021)	"Waiting on a War" (2021)	"Making a Fire" (2021)

Music video
- "Waiting on a War" on YouTube

"Waiting on a War" is a song by American rock band Foo Fighters. It was released as the third single off of their tenth album Medicine at Midnight.

== Background ==
The song was first released on January 14, 2021, as the third single from their tenth studio album, Medicine at Midnight, after "Shame Shame" and "No Son of Mine". The date was chosen to celebrate frontman Dave Grohl's 52nd birthday. The band debuted the song live on Jimmy Kimmel Live! on the same date.

== Composition and lyrics ==
"Waiting on a War" has been described as an "aching" folk rock ballad, starting as acoustic pop rock but progressing into 1970s-esque hard rock by the outro. Most of the song is composed of Grohl singing over an acoustic guitar, bass, drums, and strings, before building in intensity in its second half, and moving into an energetic, full-band rock sound with electric guitars for the last minute. The song was noted to have a more traditional Foo Fighters sound than prior singles from the album.

Lyrically, the song was described as the Foo Fighters' modern approach to a "Give Peace a Chance" type song, with Grohl pondering the possibility of a dark future. The lyrical content was inspired by bleak conversation Grohl had had with his own daughter Harper Grohl, in 2019, which reminded him of his own worries about the world:

"Last fall, as I was driving my daughter to school, she turned to me and asked 'Daddy, is there going to be a war?'. My heart sank as I realized that she was now living under the same dark cloud that I had felt 40 years ago. I wrote "Waiting on a War" that day. Everyday waiting for the sky to fall. Is there more to this than that? Is there more to this than just waiting on a war? Because I need more. We all do.

Grohl later explained that he himself had feared the effect of the Cold War while growing up in Washington DC. Upon the completion of the song, Grohl felt it was one of the best songs the band had ever written.

== Music video ==
A music video directed by Paola Kudacki was released for the song on January 19, 2021. It features the band performing mixed with cinematic shots of young people whose carefree outlook on life is threatened by ominous-looking adults who have brown paper bags over their heads.

== Reception ==
Rolling Stone singled the song out as the standout track on Medicine at Midnight.

== Personnel ==
Personnel taken from Medicine at Midnight liner notes. (Note: The band members' instruments are not credited in the album's liner notes. Their primary instruments are listed based on their de facto primary roles in the group.)

Foo Fighters

- Dave Grohl – vocals, acoustic guitar, production
- Taylor Hawkins – drums, production
- Rami Jaffee – keyboards, production
- Nate Mendel – bass, production
- Chris Shiflett – guitar, production
- Pat Smear – guitar, production

Additional Personnel

- Omar Hakim - percussion
- Songa Lee – violin
- Charlie Bisharat – violin
- Alma Fernandez – viola
- Jacob Braun – cello
- Greg Kurstin – production, string arrangements

== Charts ==
=== Weekly charts ===
Weekly chart performance for "Waiting on a War"
Chart (2021)	Peak position
Australia Digital Tracks (ARIA)	33
Belgium (Ultratip Bubbling Under Wallonia)	46
Canada Hot 100 (Billboard)	95
Canada Rock (Billboard)	1
Czech Republic Modern Rock (IFPI)	3
Iceland (RÚV)	11
Japan Hot Overseas (Billboard Japan)	3
New Zealand Hot Singles (RMNZ)	10
Switzerland Airplay (Schweizer Hitparade)	98
UK Singles (Official Charts)	53
US Hot Rock & Alternative Songs (Billboard)	18
US Rock & Alternative Airplay (Billboard)	1

=== Year-end charts ===
Year-end chart performance for "Waiting on a War"
Chart (2021)	Position
US Hot Rock & Alternative Songs (Billboard)	79
US Rock Airplay (Billboard)	9

== Awards ==
Year	Award	Results
2022	Grammy Award for Best Rock Song	Won
