= Crybaby (Paloma Faith song) =

Single by Paloma Faith

from the album The Architect
- Released: 31 August 2017
- Recorded: 2016
- Genre: Soul-funk; disco
- Length: 3:53
- Label: RCA; Sony UK
- Songwriter(s): Lindy Robbins; Paloma Faith; Fin Dow-Smith; Cleo Tighe
- Producer(s): Starsmith

Paloma Faith singles chronology
"Beauty Remains" (2015)	"Crybaby" (2017)	"Guilty" (2017)

Music video
- "Cry Baby" on YouTube

"Crybaby" is a song performed by English recording artist Paloma Faith. The song was released as a digital download on 31 August 2017 as the lead single from her fourth studio album The Architect (2017). The song peaked at number 36 on the UK Singles Chart.

== Background and composition ==
"Crybaby" is a "slinky soul-funk" and disco track. The song was written by Paloma Faith, Lindy Robbins, Cleo Tighe and Fin Dow-Smith, with the latter handling production. The song talks about toxic masculinity, with Paloma describing the song's lyrics as "a conversation between a man and I (sic), and the song questions whether global conflicts would cease to exist if men successfully dealt with their feelings. Would things be resolved without attack and with measured discussion?"

== Music video ==
The dystopian visual for "Crybaby" premiered on 22 September 2017.

== Charts ==
"Cry Baby" chart performance
Chart (2017)	Peak position
Belgium (Ultratip Bubbling Under Flanders)	34
Croatia (HRT)	29
Scotland (OCC)	12
UK Singles (OCC)	36
UK Singles Downloads (OCC)	7

== Certifications ==
"Cry Baby" certifications
Region	Certification	Certified units/sales
United Kingdom (BPI)	Silver	200,000^{‡}
^{‡} Sales+streaming figures based on certification alone.

== Release history ==
"Cry Baby" release history
Region	Date	Format	Label	Ref.
United Kingdom	31 August 2017	Digital download	RCA; Sony	
