= The Sky Is a Neighborhood =

2017 single by Foo Fighters

Single by Foo Fighters

from the album Concrete and Gold
- Released: August 23, 2017
- Genre: Alternative rock; hard rock; blues rock
- Length: 4:04
- Label: RCA
- Songwriters: Dave Grohl; Taylor Hawkins; Nate Mendel; Chris Shiflett; Pat Smear; Rami Jaffee
- Producer: Greg Kurstin

Foo Fighters singles chronology
"Run" (2017)	"The Sky Is a Neighborhood" (2017)	"The Line" (2018)

Music video
- "The Sky is a Neighborhood" on YouTube

"The Sky Is a Neighborhood" is a song by American rock band Foo Fighters. It was released as the second single from their ninth album Concrete and Gold on August 23, 2017. As of November 2017, the song had peaked at number one on the Billboard Mainstream Rock Songs chart and seven on the Alternative Songs chart.

== Background ==
The song was one of the last written and recorded for the band's ninth studio album, Concrete and Gold, being written during a two-week break the band went on after feeling they had already completed the album. Frontman Dave Grohl, inspired by the night sky in Hawaii, wrote what would become "The Sky Is a Neighborhood", and recorded the track over the course of a single afternoon. The song was first publicly premiered at a live acoustic show by Grohl and drummer Taylor Hawkins in May 2017, at The Fillmore in San Francisco. The full band first performed the song live at a show in Iceland the following month. The final studio version was released as the album's second single on August 23, 2017.

== Themes and composition ==
The name and phrase "The Sky Is a Neighborhood" originated from Grohl's lifelong hobby of stargazing and thinking about Earth's place in the universe, with him explaining "One night I was lying out looking up at stars. Just imagining all of these stars as places that have life on them as well, and I decided that the sky is a neighborhood, that we need to keep our s— together in order to survive in this universe full of life." The lyrics were also inspired by the video The Most Astounding Fact by astrophysicist Neil DeGrasse Tyson. Grohl explained:

It basically talks about the atoms that comprise life on Earth and make up the human body are traceable to the beginnings of our universe. Stars that go unstable and collapse and explode and just scatter their guts, their fundamental ingredients of life are all over the universe and forming solar systems and stars orbiting planets have the ingredients for life itself. And when you look up at the night sky, you realize that you're not only part of the universe, but the universe is part of us. It really moves me.

Rolling Stone described the song as "Grohl [narrating] a sleepless night worrying about the state of the planet". Some journalists noted that the line "Trouble to the right and left/ Who's side are you on?" sounded like an allusion to the political unrest found since the 2016 United States presidential election, a theme that Grohl had said had influenced him during the album's writing process.

Grohl told Radio X that the song was "the biggest thing sonically we've ever done" Spin magazine described the song's sound as a "[Rolling] Stones-esque blues ballad", while NPR described it as "a soulful stomp that turns psychedelic."

== Music video ==
The music video for the song was directed by Grohl, and parts feature his daughters Violet and Harper. The video consists of Grohl's daughters amusing themselves with books and toys in a small cabin, while Grohl himself and the rest of the band performs on the roof with bright glowing eyes, intermittently stomping on the roof and catching the attention of the girls. Parts of the song's lyrics appear in the books the girls read. The band's performance punctures holes in the roof, creating the appearance of constellations, and eventually causes the girls to levitate and rotate in the cabin at the conclusion of the video. In one shot, a framed photo of the famous Serbian-American scientist Nikola Tesla can be seen. Grohl explained the inspiration behind the video:

It's crazy because a lot of that is based on dreams that I've had about 20 years ago, where I was walking along this coastal city in Italy just as the sun was going down and the stars were coming out and then the sky just imploded into millions of UFOs swarming around. So everyone just fell to the ground and looked up, and there were these films being projected in the sky of the evolution of man, and the new territories, and how they'll be divided, and why we're here and how we were created. Just this really trippy dream that stayed with me my entire life. It seemed like all that imagery fell into place with the lyrics of the song.

Grohl explained that the inclusion of his daughters was a result of them repeatedly asking to be a part of the band's videos, and Grohl finding a good way to implement them. He also explained that he preferred directing the video because he felt he was better able to connect the song's meaning and videos himself rather than through third party written video treatments. NPR described the video as being similar to Stranger Things due to the sci-fi/fantasy setting with the involvement of young children.

== Reception ==
The song was generally well received commercially and critically. As of September 2017, the song had peaked at number seven on the Billboard US Mainstream Rock Songs chart. ABC News singled out the song as a standout track on Concrete and Gold, stating that "within the context of the record it really stands out ... Grohl sells it with his shout and the background choir of voices gives it a wonderfully ominous touch. MetalSucks praised the song's sound for being "like nothing the band has ever done before, but it still fits in perfectly with the rest of their material. This, my friends, is artistic evolution done right." Foo Fighters performed "The Sky Is a Neighborhood" at the 2018 Brit Awards where they won the award for International Group.

== Personnel ==
Credits taken from Concrete and Gold liner notes.

- Dave Grohl – lead vocal, guitar
- Taylor Hawkins – drums, background vocals
- Nate Mendel – bass
- Chris Shiflett – guitar
- Pat Smear – guitar

=== Guest musicians ===
- Alison Mosshart – background vocals
- Rachel Grace – violin
- Ginny Luke – violin
- Thomas Lea – viola
- Kings Bacik – cello

== Charts ==
=== Weekly charts ===
Chart (2017–2018)	Peak position
Belgium (Ultratip Bubbling Under Flanders)	17
Belgium (Ultratip Bubbling Under Wallonia)	37
Canadian All-format Airplay (Billboard)	37
Canada Rock (Billboard)	1
Finland Airplay (Radiosoittolista)	42
Mexico Ingles Airplay (Billboard)	43
Netherlands Single Tip (MegaCharts)	24
New Zealand Heatseekers (RMNZ)	7
Portugal (AFP)	84
Scottish Singles Sales (Official Charts)	38
Sweden Heatseeker (Sverigetopplistan)	4
Switzerland Airplay (Schweizer Hitparade)	86
UK Singles (Official Charts)	63
UK Rock & Metal (Official Charts)	1
US Hot Rock & Alternative Songs (Billboard)	10
US Rock & Alternative Airplay (Billboard)	1

2025 weekly chart performance for "The Sky Is a Neighborhood"
Chart (2025)	Peak position
Russia Streaming (TopHit)	99

=== Year-end charts ===
Chart (2017)	Position
US Hot Rock Songs (Billboard)	62
US Rock Airplay (Billboard)	41

Chart (2018)	Position
US Hot Rock Songs (Billboard)	58
US Rock Airplay (Billboard)	27

== Certifications ==
Region	Certification	Certified units/sales
Australia (ARIA)	Gold	35,000^{‡}
Canada (Music Canada)	Gold	40,000^{‡}
Mexico (AMPROFON)	Gold	30,000^{‡}
New Zealand (RMNZ)	Gold	15,000^{‡}
United Kingdom (BPI)	Silver	200,000^{‡}
^{‡} Sales+streaming figures based on certification alone.
