= Making a Fire =

Single by Foo Fighters

from the album Medicine at Midnight
- Released: June 8, 2021
- Recorded: October 2019 – February 2020
- Studio: Unnamed house in Encino, Los Angeles
- Genre: Power pop
- Length: 4:15
- Label: RCA; Roswell
- Songwriters: Dave Grohl; Taylor Hawkins; Nate Mendel; Chris Shiflett; Pat Smear; Rami Jaffee
- Producers: Foo Fighters; Greg Kurstin

Foo Fighters singles chronology
| "Waiting on a War" (2021) | "Making a Fire" (2021) | "Love Dies Young" (2021) |

Alternate cover
- Cover art for the Mark Ronson Re-version

"Making a Fire" is a song by American rock band Foo Fighters, the opening track on their tenth studio album, Medicine at Midnight (2021). It was released to rock radio stations on June 8, 2021, making it the album's fourth single.

== Release ==
Prior to the release of Medicine at Midnight, Foo Fighters shared a snippet of "Making a Fire", along with "Cloudspotter", on February 1, 2021. Around this time, the band also pre-released the song as a music video which was filmed on location at the Japanese sake brand "Tatenokawa," known for its Junmai Daiginjo sake. It was filmed and directed by Taro Okagawa and produced by Hiroshi Ogawa.

After the album's release, "Making a Fire" was included in the soundtrack for the baseball video game MLB The Show 21, released in April 2021. The song was released to rock-centric radio stations on June 8, 2021, making it the fourth single released from Medicine at Midnight. It became Foo Fighters' 11th song to reach number 1 on the Billboard Mainstream Rock Airplay chart. A re-recorded version of the song produced by Mark Ronson was released on June 25, 2021, featuring musicians from bands such as the Budos Band, Antibalas, and the Tedeschi Trucks Band, as well as background vocals by Alecia Chakour, Jasmine Muhammad, Saundra Williams, and Violet Grohl.

== Composition and themes ==
According to insider.com, "The album kicks off with the jovial tune "Making a Fire", which boasts a funky 3/4 groove. The chorus is especially catchy thanks to a gospely "na-na-na" refrain with harmonies from some female vocalists including Grohl's daughter Violet." According to Rolling Stone, the song "Making a Fire" is "brighter and more optimistic than anything they’ve ever done".

== Track listing ==
Digital download
| No. | Title | Length |
|---|---|---|
| 1. | "Making a Fire" (Mark Ronson Re-version) | 4:30 |

7"
| No. | Title | Length |
|---|---|---|
| 1. | "Making a Fire" (Mark Ronson Re-version) | 4:30 |
| 2. | "Chasing Birds" (Preservation Hall Jazz Band Re-version) | 3:38 |

== Charts ==
=== Original version ===
==== Weekly charts ====
Weekly chart performance for "Making a Fire"
| Chart (2021) | Peak position |
|---|---|
| Canada All-format Airplay (Billboard) | 50 |
| Canada Rock (Billboard) | 1 |
| Ireland (IRMA) (Note: irish-charts.com incorrectly shows the charting version as being the Mark Ronson Re-Version. This is because the song charted in Ireland on February 12, 2021, which was the week after the Medicine at Midnight album was released and the Mark Ronson Re-Version was not released until June 25, 2021) | 85 |
| New Zealand Hot Singles (RMNZ) | 6 |
| UK Singles (Official Charts) | 52 |
| UK Rock & Metal (Official Charts) | 1 |
| US Hot Rock & Alternative Songs (Billboard) | 30 |
| US Rock & Alternative Airplay (Billboard) | 1 |

==== Year-end charts ====
Year-end chart performance for "Making a Fire"
| Chart (2021) | Position |
|---|---|
| US Hot Rock & Alternative Songs (Billboard) | 94 |
| US Rock Airplay (Billboard) | 11 |

=== Mark Ronson Re-version ===
==== Weekly charts ====
Weekly chart performance for "Making a Fire" (Mark Ronson Re-version)
| Chart (2022) | Peak position |
|---|---|
| UK Physical Singles (OCC) | 5 |
| UK Vinyl Singles (OCC) | 3 |

== Awards ==
| Year | Award | Results |
|---|---|---|
| 2022 | Grammy Award for Best Rock Performance | Won |
