= Shame Shame =

2020 single by Foo Fighters

Single by Foo Fighters

from the album Medicine at Midnight
- Released: November 7, 2020
- Recorded: 2019–2020
- Studio: Unnamed house in Encino, Los Angeles
- Genre: Alternative rock; art rock
- Length: 4:17
- Label: RCA
- Songwriters: Dave Grohl; Taylor Hawkins; Nate Mendel; Chris Shiflett; Pat Smear; Rami Jaffee
- Producers: Foo Fighters; Greg Kurstin

Foo Fighters singles chronology
"The Line" (2018)	"Shame Shame" (2020)	"No Son of Mine" (2021)

Music video
- "Shame Shame" on YouTube

"Shame Shame" is a song by American rock band Foo Fighters. The song is from the band's tenth studio album, Medicine at Midnight (2021). It was released as the album's first single on November 7, 2020.

== Background ==
Foo Fighters' singer and guitarist Dave Grohl has stated that "Shame Shame" is unlike anything Foo Fighters have ever done before and that the song allowed them to "move into another territory" with their sound on their new album, Medicine at Midnight.

According to the band's bassist Nate Mendel, "Shame Shame" started off as a "just a bunch of clicks from Dave" and originally didn't involve any bass line until he ended up recording extra parts for the song that were ultimately included.

== Live performances ==
Foo Fighters performed "Shame Shame" live for the first time on Saturday Night Live on November 7, 2020. On September 12, 2021 the band performed the song in a medley at 2021 MTV Video Music Awards at the Barclays Center in Brooklyn, when they won the award for Global Icon.

== Music video ==
The music video was directed by Paola Kudacki and features Sofia Boutella. Grohl has stated that it was inspired by an unsettling dream he had as a teenager that he had remembered all his life and said that the video was darker than anything they had done before.

== Reception ==
With 9.3 million audience impressions for "Shame Shame", Foo Fighters took back the record of most number 1's on the Billboard Rock Airplay chart, which also marked the fastest rise to the top of the chart in four years.

== Personnel ==
Personnel taken from Medicine at Midnight liner notes. (Note: The band members' instruments are not credited in the album's liner notes. Their primary instruments are listed based on their de facto primary roles in the group.)

Foo Fighters

- Dave Grohl – lead vocals, guitar, producer
- Taylor Hawkins – drums, producer
- Rami Jaffee – keyboards, producer
- Nate Mendel – bass, producer
- Chris Shiflett – guitar, producer
- Pat Smear – guitar, producer

Additional musicians

- Samantha Sidley – background vocals
- Violet Grohl – background vocals
- Barbara Gruska – background vocals
- Laura Mace – background vocals
- Inara George – background vocals
- Omar Hakim – percussion
- Songa Lee – violin
- Charlie Bisharat – violin
- Alma Fernandez - viola
- Jacob Braun - cello

Technical

- Greg Kurstin – producer, string arrangements
- Foo Fighters – producers
- Randy Merrill – mastering engineer
- Mark "Spike" Stent – mixing engineer
- Darrell Thorp – engineer
- Matt Wolach – assistant engineer
- Alex Pasco – assistant engineer

== Charts ==
=== Weekly charts ===
Weekly chart performance for "Shame Shame"
Chart (2020)	Peak position
Australia Digital Tracks (ARIA)	40
Belgium (Ultratip Bubbling Under Flanders)	5
Belgium (Ultratip Bubbling Under Wallonia)	26
Canada All-format Airplay (Billboard)	43
Canada Hot Digital Songs (Billboard)	23
Canada Rock (Billboard)	1
Czech Republic Modern Rock (IFPI)	2
New Zealand Hot Singles (RMNZ)	9
Scotland Singles (Official Charts)	36
UK Singles (Official Charts)	77
UK Singles Downloads (Official Charts)	34
US Digital Song Sales (Billboard)	32
US Rock & Alternative Airplay (Billboard)	1
US Hot Rock & Alternative Songs (Billboard)	11
Wales (OCC)	37

=== Year-end charts ===
Year-end chart performance for "Shame Shame"
Chart (2021)	Position
US Hot Rock & Alternative Songs (Billboard)	61
US Rock Airplay (Billboard)	6

== Awards ==
Year	Award	Results
2021	MTV Video Music Award for Best Rock Video	Nominated
2021	MTV Video Music Award for Best Choreography	Nominated
2021	MTV Video Music Award for Best Cinematography	Nominated
