= Concrete and Gold =

- First edition cover art

Studio album by Foo Fighters
- Released: September 15, 2017
- Recorded: December 2016 – May 2017
- Studios: EastWest, Los Angeles
- Genres: Hard rock; progressive rock; post-grunge
- Length: 48:21
- Labels: Roswell; RCA
- Producers: Foo Fighters; Greg Kurstin

Foo Fighters chronology
Saint Cecilia (2015)	Concrete and Gold (2017)	Foo Files (2019)

Singles from Concrete and Gold
- 1. "Run" Released: June 1, 2017; 2. "The Sky Is a Neighborhood" Released: August 23, 2017; 3. "The Line" Released: May 1, 2018

Concrete and Gold is the ninth studio album by American rock band Foo Fighters, released on September 15, 2017, through Roswell and RCA Records. It is the band's first album to be produced alongside Greg Kurstin. Described by the band as an album where "hard rock extremes and pop sensibilities collide", Concrete and Gold concerns the future of the United States from the viewpoint of the band's frontman and lead songwriter Dave Grohl, with the heated atmosphere of the 2016 elections and the presidency of Donald Trump cited as major influences by Grohl. Juxtapositions serve as a common motif in both the album's lyrical and musical composition, with Grohl further describing the album's overall theme as "hope and desperation".

Writing and recording of Concrete and Gold started in late 2016, after Grohl ended a self-imposed six-month hiatus from music while recovering from an injury sustained on the Sonic Highways World Tour. Working off a set of twelve or thirteen ideas for songs conceived by Grohl, the band enlisted the help of Kurstin, a pop music producer, who had never worked on a heavy rock record previously. The studio at which the band chose to record Concrete and Gold, EastWest Studios in Hollywood, California, fostered collaborations with various other artists who were also working at the studio at the time, including Shawn Stockman of Boyz II Men, Justin Timberlake, and Paul McCartney. It is the first Foo Fighters studio album to feature long-time session and touring keyboardist Rami Jaffee as a permanent member, marked as the band's first album which recorded as six-piece band.

Concrete and Gold was received positively by music critics, who praised the album's more expansive feel, both musically and lyrically. Modest criticism was aimed at the perceived lack of musical deviation from the band's previous albums. The album became the band's second to debut at number one on the Billboard 200, moving 127,000 album-equivalent units and selling 120,000 copies in its first week in the United States. The album also debuted at number one on twelve other national album charts, such as the United Kingdom Official Albums Chart and Australian ARIA Albums Chart. Singles from the album also found success; "Run" and "The Sky Is a Neighborhood" both peaked at number one at the Billboard Mainstream Rock Songs chart. An eponymous headlining tour to promote the album ran through the second half of 2017.

== Background ==
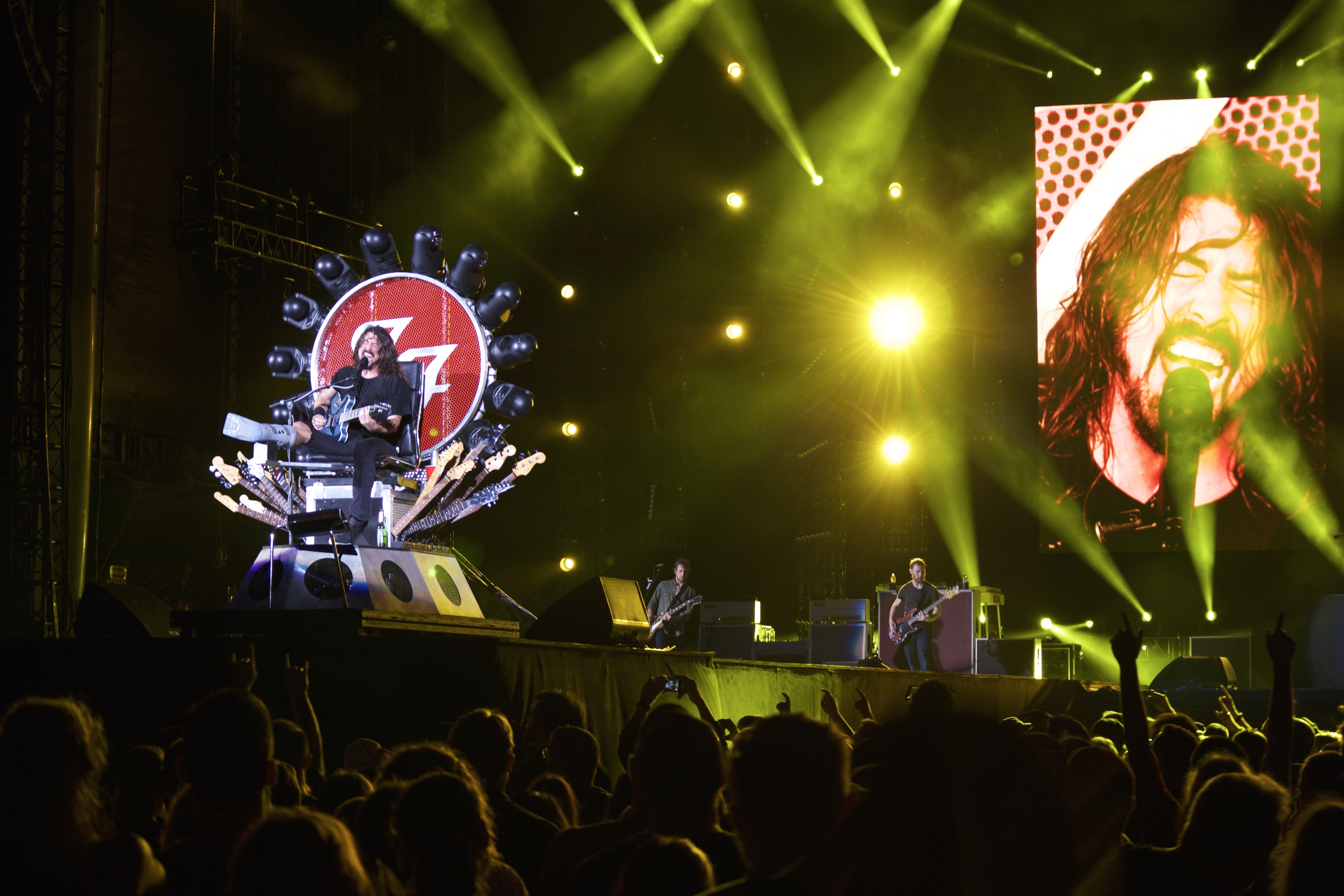
Dave Grohl performing with a broken leg on the Sonic Highways World Tour.

The band's earliest ideas for their ninth studio album included creating a studio on the Hollywood Bowl amphitheater in California and recording the album live in front of a crowd of 20,000 people. However, frontman Dave Grohl lost interest in the idea upon learning that it had already recently been done by PJ Harvey with her 2015 recording sessions for her album The Hope Six Demolition Project. Plans further changed due to the events of the band touring in support of their prior studio album, Sonic Highways, when Grohl fell off the stage and broke his leg at a June 2015 concert in Sweden. Through the use of a self-designed "throne", a large chair that could sit him comfortably on stage, Grohl and the band completed the tour and recorded the Saint Cecilia EP.

After the tour, in early 2016, the band announced they would enter an indefinite hiatus. While no reasons were given at the time, in 2017, Grohl told Rolling Stone that he was still struggling from the injury, still unable to walk and enduring daily, lengthy physical therapy sessions. He secluded himself from the band, and set a goal for himself to stay away from music for an entire year while he focused on recuperating. However, at six months to the day, he cancelled the plan when he began writing the lyrics to the track "Run".

== Writing and recording ==
"The last couple of albums had been made in ways that we were trying to get out of our comfort zone. I thought, 'What's the strangest thing for this band to do at this point?' And then I realized it was just to go into a studio and make a fucking album like a normal band."

— Frontman Dave Grohl, comparing the Concrete and Gold recording sessions to 2014's Sonic Highways, which was recorded in different studios around the U.S., and 2011's Wasting Light, which they did in Grohl's garage to emulate the recording process of the 1990s and earlier.

Initial writing sessions only involved Grohl, who continued being in seclusion from the band, although he initially struggled, feeling "out of practice" and "creatively atrophied" due to his longer than usual break from music. Grohl rented an Airbnb in Ojai, California, so he could focus on long bouts of writing, with Grohl recounting "I brought a case of wine and sat there in my underwear with a microphone for about five days, just writing." After twelve or thirteen rough ideas were mapped out, he ran them by the band, who shared Grohl's belief that he was on the right track with the material. Happy with his work, but feeling the material still required further development, Grohl started thinking about reaching out to a music producer.

The band ended up working with music producer Greg Kurstin on the album. Grohl had been listening to the work of Kurstin's indie pop band, The Bird and the Bee since 2014 and was very impressed with his work, calling it "so much more sophisticated than anything [he'd] ever heard." Grohl reached out to Kurstin, and learned that he had taken a hiatus from The Bird and the Bee to focus on his work as a music producer, producing songs including Halsey's "Strangers", Sia's "The Greatest" and "Cheap Thrills", and Adele's "Hello". The two both were interested in the challenge presented with working together – Kurstin had never worked on a heavy rock album, while Grohl had never worked with a pop songwriter – and decided to collaborate on the album.

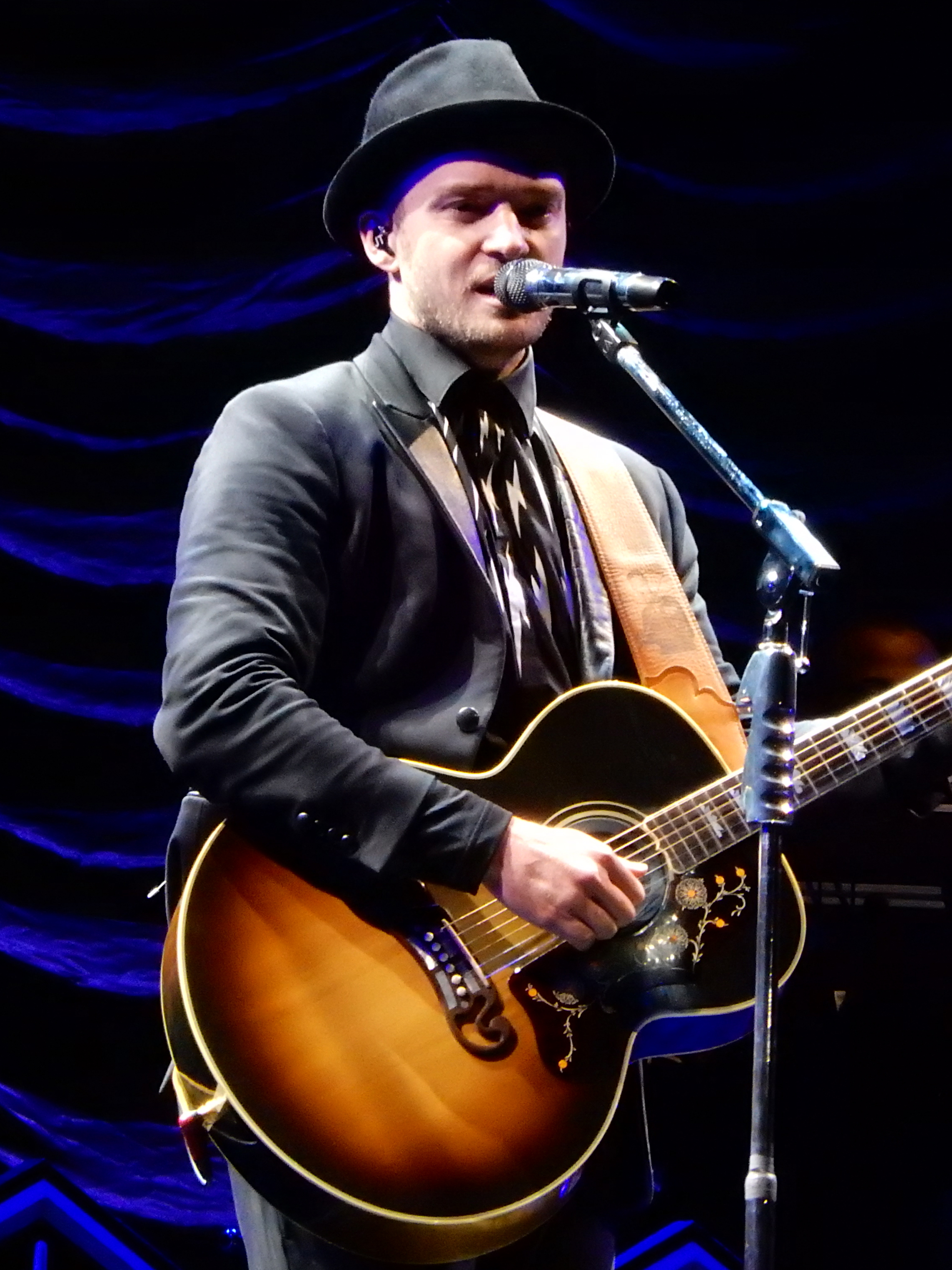
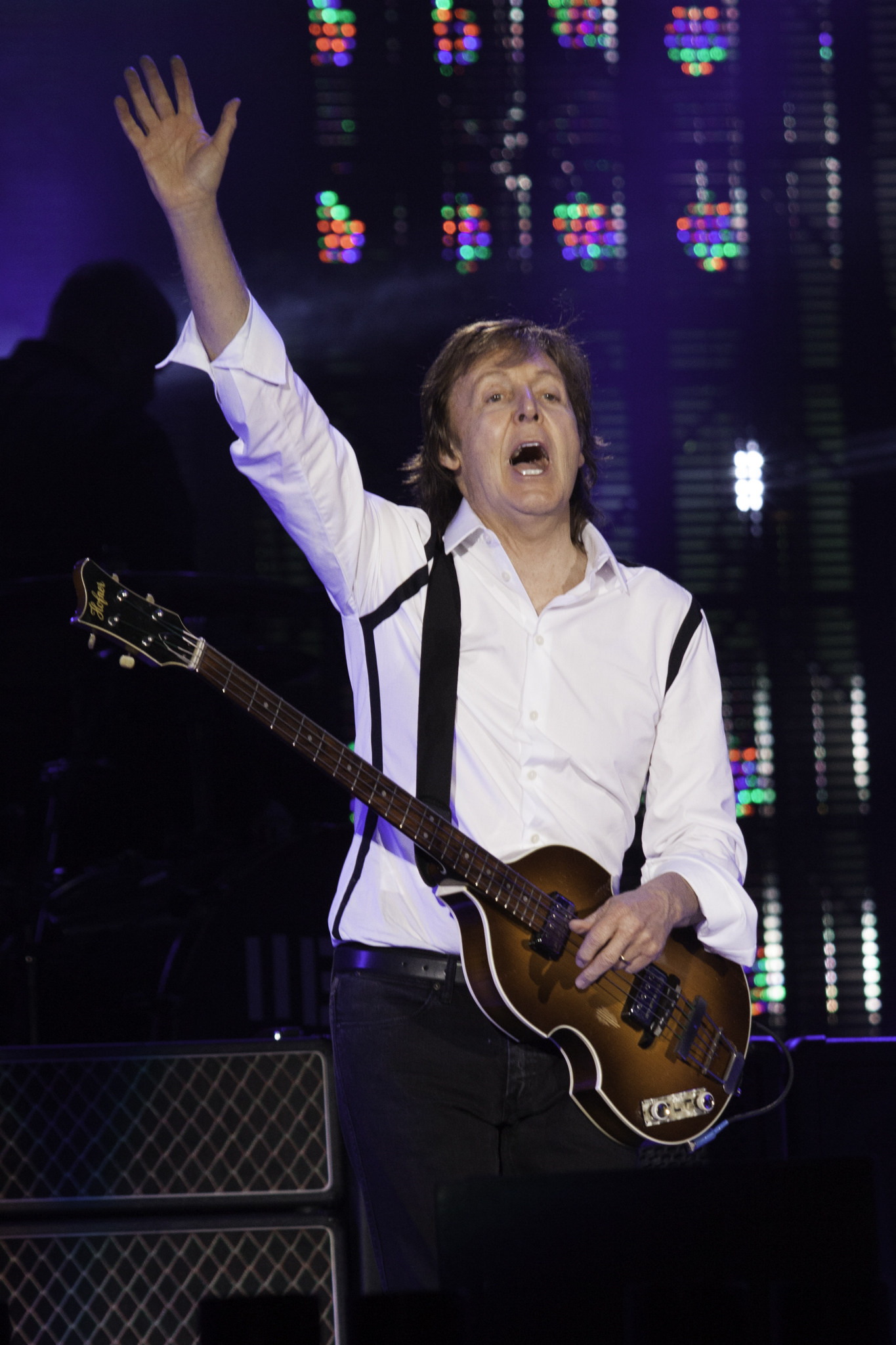
Justin Timberlake (left) and Paul McCartney (right) were two of many musicians the band interacted and collaborated with during the recording of Concrete and Gold at EastWest Studios.

Recording was done at the heavily populated EastWest Studios, where the band frequently ran into, and interacted with, various other musicians in the studio building. Recording sessions frequently culminated in large barbecues and alcohol drinking among the other artists using the studios, often leading to Grohl grilling meat for parties of up to forty people while finishing up recording sessions. The setup led to the band having a number of high-profile collaborations on the album. The band worked with Boyz II Men member Shawn Stockman on the album's title track and album closer, which stemmed from a chance meeting between Grohl and Stockman in the parking lot. Grohl also announced that "probably the biggest pop star in the world" would provide backing vocals on a track as well, though he refused to name who, leading to much speculation due to the number of pop stars Kurstin had previously worked with prior to the Foo Fighters. Grohl later clarified that it was not Adele or Taylor Swift, and that the person has "been around a long time", and eventually revealed it to be Justin Timberlake. Further collaborations include vocals by Inara George on the track "Dirty Water", saxophone by David Koz on the track "La Dee Da", and vocals by Alison Mosshart of The Kills on "La Dee Da" and "The Sky Is a Neighborhood". Additionally, Paul McCartney contributed drums to the track "Sunday Rain" after entering the studio and recording two drum tracks without even hearing the song first, basing his performance entirely on Grohl recreating the song acoustically for him on the spot. Concrete and Gold also marks Rami Jaffee's first credit as an official band member, having been a session and touring keyboardist for the band since 2005.

While not a formal collaborator on the album, Grohl also would travel to visit past collaborator Josh Homme of Queens of the Stone Age during the recording sessions as well, who was working in the nearby United Recording music studio. The two often played in-progress material for each other, as each was working on a new approach of recording a rock album with a pop music producer, Homme doing the same thing with music producer Mark Ronson on the album Villains.

== Composition and themes ==
The band describe the album's sound as where "hard rock extremes and pop sensibilities collide", comparing it conceptually to being "Motorhead's version of Sgt. Pepper" or "Slayer making Pet Sounds". Explaining further, the album's sound was described as combining heavy guitar riffs with "lush harmonic complexities". Hawkins added that in contrast to their mindset in the previous albums going to "let's make a good rock n' roll record", Concrete and Gold was "the weird record." Grohl described the title track, which features the vocals of Shawn Stockman from Boyz II Men, as sounding like "Black Sabbath and Pink Floyd" and explaining that they "built a choir" out of Stockman's vocal takes, overdubbing them so it sounds "like 40 vocals stacked". Hawkins described the album as their "most psychedelic" and "weirdest" sounding. Critics have also described the album as hard rock progressive rock or post-grunge.

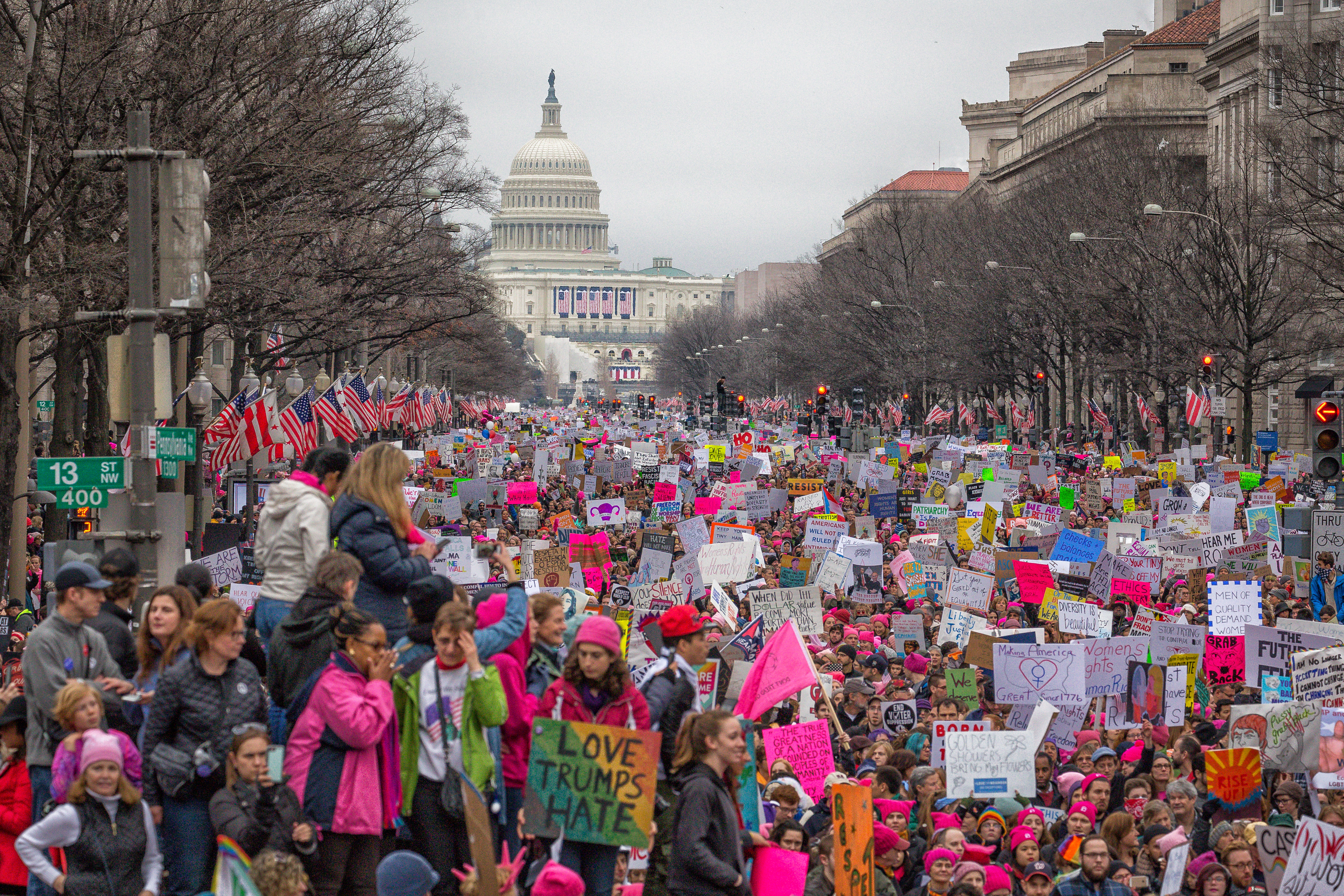
The political atmosphere surrounding the presidency of Donald Trump was cited as an influence on Concrete and Gold's lyrics.

Lyrically, the album is based around Grohl's thoughts about the future of the United States – "politically, personally, as a father, an American and a musician". While the lyrics were written to vent Grohl's political frustrations, the album lyrics themselves are not overtly-political. Grohl also stated an overall theme of the album was “hope and desperation”. "The Sky Is a Neighborhood" and "T-Shirt" represent a more bleak worldview by Grohl's, the two songs showing his concern for the future of humanity, and desire for escapism, respectively. The election and presidency of Donald Trump was cited as a huge influence of Grohl's negativity, with Grohl stating:

I look at all of the different periods of time where I've written lyrics, and they all have their own references and different phases. This one came out pretty clear: I'm a father now, I have to consider a lot more than I used to, and I think I've realised we're not all as free as we were before. In every way. I mean, as the political arena started heating up in America before the elections, it became clear that there was so much more threatening all of our lives than I'd considered before. I'm looking at a candidate that has blatant disregard for the future environmentally, when it comes to women's rights, diplomatically. ... I have three daughters that are going to survive me for decades – how are they going to get on unless there's some positive and progressive change?

— Dave Grohl

The song "La Dee Da" was written about a childhood friend of Grohl's who introduced him to underground music, namedropping the British experimental bands Whitehouse, Death in June and Psychic TV.

== Release and promotion ==
The album was released on September 15, 2017. Two singles were released prior to the album's release, "Run", which topped the US Billboard Mainstream Rock Songs chart in July 2017, and "The Sky Is a Neighborhood", which is at number 13 on the chart. A third song, "The Line", was also released a week prior to the album, and tracks such as "La Dee Da" had been debuted at live shows earlier in 2017. The band commenced a headlining North American tour in support of the album starting in October 2017. Prior to the tour, the band also plans on throwing their own festival – "Cal Jam 17" – with performances from themselves, Queens of the Stone Age, Cage the Elephant, and a number of other bands, as a large-scale version of an album-release party. Promotions will continue into 2018, including a joint touring with Weezer through Australia and New Zealand in January and February. On October 20, 2017, the band released a previously unreleased b-side song from the album sessions, "Soldier", for the Planned Parenthood benefit compilation album 7-Inches for Planned Parenthood. The third single from the album, "The Line" was released on May 1, 2018.

== Reception ==
Professional ratings
Aggregate scores
Source	Rating
AnyDecentMusic?	6.6/10
Metacritic	72/100
Review scores
Source	Rating
AllMusic	3.5/5 stars
The A.V. Club	B+
The Guardian	3/5 stars
The Independent	3/5 stars
Mojo	4/5 stars
NME	4/5 stars
Pitchfork	6.5/10
Q	3/5 stars
Rolling Stone	3.5/5 stars
Uncut	7/10

=== Critical response ===
Concrete and Gold received generally positive reviews from critics. At Metacritic, which assigns a normalized rating out of 100 to reviews from mainstream critics, the album has an average score of 72 out of 100, which indicates "generally favorable reviews" based on 29 reviews.

In his review for AllMusic, editor Stephen Thomas Erlewine concluded that "Foo Fighters show that they're in love with light and shade, fury and quiet, every twist and turn they can make with their instruments, and even if Concrete and Gold isn't about much more than that, it's refreshing to hear the Foos embrace to the logical flashing conclusion of Grohl's allegiance to real rock values." Writing for Classic Rock magazine, Mark Beaumont praised the album for being the "most cohesive consume-in-one-sitting Foo Fighters album in a decade" and concluded that "Grohl does emerge from the modern age with some glimmer of optimism and defiance. ... If Dave Grohl is an enduring icon of rocking through the hard times, we need him – and Concrete And Gold – now more than ever."

Newsday critic Glenn Gamboa praised Kurstin's production on the album, and the band as well for successfully expressing grander and more artistic statements than past albums. Jon Pareles of The New York Times praised the band's ability to make something new out of all of their influences, concluding that "Mr. Grohl and Foo Fighters wear their influences so openly—Pink Floyd in Concrete and Gold, Led Zeppelin in Make It Right, the Beatles all over the album—that they still come across as earnest, proficient journeymen, disciples rather than trailblazers. But in 2017, there aren’t even many disciples left, while Foo Fighters keep honing their skills."

In a more reserved review for The Guardian, Alexis Petridis wrote, "Concrete and Gold sees the Foo Fighters gently and enjoyably nudge at the boundaries of what they do, rather than crashing through them to new territory. It's an album that won't frighten the horses, but provides enough fresh interest to keep the band ticking over: for the Foo Fighters, you suspect, that means mission accomplished." Emma Swann gave the album a three-out-of-five star rating in her review for DIY, calling it "more interesting than one might've expected."

=== Commercial performance ===
The album debuted at number one on the Billboard 200 all-format album chart with 127,000 album-equivalent units, of which 120,000 were digital and physical album sales. It is Foo Fighters' second US number-one album, after Wasting Light. Concrete and Gold also became the Foo Fighters' fourth number-one album in the United Kingdom's Official Albums Chart, with 61,000 album-equivalent units, and their seventh in Australia's ARIA Charts, where it soon got certified gold for 35,000 units.

=== Accolades ===
Accolades for Concrete and Gold
Publication	Accolade	Year	Rank
NME	NME's Albums of the Year 2017	2017	27

== Track listing ==
All tracks are written by Foo Fighters.

Concrete and Gold track listing
No.	Title	Length
1.	"T-Shirt"	1:22
2.	"Run"	5:23
3.	"Make It Right"	4:39
4.	"The Sky Is a Neighborhood"	4:04
5.	"La Dee Da"	4:02
6.	"Dirty Water"	5:20
7.	"Arrows"	4:26
8.	"Happy Ever After (Zero Hour)"	3:41
9.	"Sunday Rain"	6:11
10.	"The Line"	3:38
11.	"Concrete and Gold"	5:31
Total length:		48:21

== Personnel ==
Credits taken from album's liner notes.

Foo Fighters

- Dave Grohl – lead vocal (tracks 1–8, 10, 11), guitar (1–7, 9–11), acoustic guitar (8), percussion (2, 8)
- Taylor Hawkins – drums (tracks 1–8, 10, 11), background vocals (1, 3, 4, 7, 10), percussion (2, 6, 8), lead vocal (9)
- Nate Mendel – bass guitar (all tracks), percussion (2, 8)
- Chris Shiflett – guitar (all tracks), percussion (2, 8)
- Pat Smear – guitar (all tracks), percussion (2, 8)
- Rami Jaffee – piano (tracks 1, 5, 10), synth (1, 6, 9), Mellotron (2, 7, 10, 11), Casio SK-1 (2), organ (2, 9), percussion (2, 8), Farfisa organ (3, 7), ARP String Ensemble (3), clavinet and Reface (5), Wurlitzer (6, 9), vibraphone (7), harmonium and pump organ (8), B3 organ (10), Moog (11)

Guest musicians

- Greg Kurstin – piano (tracks 2, 7), synth (6, 9), vibraphone (7, 10), ARP String Ensemble (7), bass synth (10)
- Taylor Greenwood – background vocals (track 1)
- Justin Timberlake – background vocals (track 3)
- Alison Mosshart – background vocals (tracks 4, 5)
- Kinga Bacik – cello (track 4)
- Thomas Lea – viola (track 4)
- Ginny Luke – violin (track 4)
- Dave Koz – saxophone (track 5)
- Inara George – background vocals (track 6)
- Jessy Greene – violin (tracks 8, 10), cello (11)
- Greg Sierpowski – Optigan (track 8)
- Paul McCartney – drums (track 9)
- Shawn Stockman – background vocals (track 11)

Production

- Greg Kurstin – production
- Foo Fighters – production
- Darrell Thorp – mixing, engineering, mastering
- Alex Pasco – engineering
- Julian Burg – engineering
- Samon Rajabnik – engineering
- Brendan Dekora – engineering
- Chaz Sexton – assistant engineer
- David Ives – mastering

== Charts ==
=== Weekly charts ===
2017 weekly chart performance
Chart (2017)	Peak position
Australian Albums (ARIA)	1
Austrian Albums (Ö3 Austria)	1
Belgian Albums (Ultratop Flanders)	1
Belgian Albums (Ultratop Wallonia)	4
Canadian Albums (Billboard)	1
Czech Albums (ČNS IFPI)	1
Danish Albums (Hitlisten)	2
Dutch Albums (Album Top 100)	1
Finnish Albums (Suomen virallinen lista)	3
French Albums (SNEP)	14
German Albums (Offizielle Top 100)	2
Greek Albums (IFPI)	6
Hungarian Albums (MAHASZ)	6
Irish Albums (IRMA)	1
Italian Albums (FIMI)	2
Latvian Albums (LaIPA)	96
Mexican Albums (Top 100 Mexico)	13
New Zealand Albums (RMNZ)	1
Norwegian Albums (VG-lista)	1
Polish Albums (ZPAV)	5
Portuguese Albums (AFP)	2
Scottish Albums (Official Charts)	1
Slovak Albums (ČNS IFPI)	9
Spanish Albums (Promusicae)	3
Swedish Albums (Sverigetopplistan)	2
Swiss Albums (Romandie)	2
Swiss Albums (Schweizer Hitparade)	1
UK Albums (Official Charts)	1
UK Rock & Metal Albums (Official Charts)	1
US Billboard 200	1
US Top Alternative Albums (Billboard)	1
US Top Hard Rock Albums (Billboard)	1
US Top Rock Albums (Billboard)	1

=== Year-end charts ===
2017 year-end chart performance
Chart (2017)	Position
Australian Albums (ARIA)	17
Austrian Albums (Ö3 Austria)	51
Belgian Albums (Ultratop Flanders)	34
Belgian Albums (Ultratop Wallonia)	115
Dutch Albums (Album Top 10p)	73
German Albums (Offizielle Top 100)	76
Italian Albums (FIMI)	82
New Zealand Albums (RMNZ)	22
Swiss Albums (Schweizer Hitparade)	47
UK Albums (OCC)	32
US Billboard 200	177
US Top Rock Albums (Billboard)	29

2018 year-end chart performance
Chart (2018)	Position
US Top Rock Albums (Billboard)	89

== Certifications ==
Certifications for Concrete and Gold
Region	Certification	Certified units/sales
Australia (ARIA)	Platinum	70,000^{^}
Canada (Music Canada)	Gold	50,000^{‡}
Italy (FIMI)	Gold	25,000^{‡}
New Zealand (RMNZ)	Platinum	15,000^{‡}
Poland (ZPAV)	Gold	10,000^{‡}
Switzerland (IFPI Switzerland)	Gold	10,000^{‡}
United Kingdom (BPI)	Gold	100,000^{‡}
^{^} Shipments figures based on certification alone.^{‡} Sales+streaming figures based on certification alone.
