= Run (Foo Fighters song) =

2017 single by Foo Fighters

Single by Foo Fighters

from the album Concrete and Gold
- Released: June 1, 2017
- Genre: Hard rock; heavy metal
- Length: 5:23 (album/single version); 4:58; (radio version)
- Label: RCA
- Songwriters: Dave Grohl; Taylor Hawkins; Nate Mendel; Chris Shiflett; Pat Smear; Rami Jaffee
- Producer: Greg Kurstin

Foo Fighters singles chronology
"Saint Cecilia" (2015)	"Run" (2017)	"The Sky Is a Neighborhood" (2017)

Music video
- "Run" on YouTube

"Run" is a song by American rock band Foo Fighters. It was released as a single on June 1, 2017, and is off their ninth studio album, Concrete and Gold. The song performed well commercially and critically, topping the Billboard US Mainstream Rock Songs chart. The song won the Grammy Award for Best Rock Song and was nominated for Best Rock Performance at the 2018 Grammys.

== Background ==
The song had first been played live in February 2017. The studio version of the song was released as a single on June 1, 2017, making it the band's first single since "Saint Cecilia" in 2015. Many music journalists noted the song was expected, but not confirmed, to be off of the band's then-upcoming ninth studio album, Concrete and Gold. The single was a surprise release, without any prior indication being made of its existence, other than the band's vague allusions to working on music over the course of 2017. Seven weeks after its initial release, the song topped the US Billboard Mainstream Rock Songs chart, the seventh song from the band to do so.

== Music video ==
A music video for the song was released on the same day. The video features the band performing the song in a nursing home (abandoned St Luke's Hospital in Pasadena, CA), in make-up making them appear as elderly versions of themselves, and end up inciting a riot amongst other patients and orderlies. The nurse in the video is played by Missi Pyle. Multiple outlets, including Billboard and People magazines, felt the music video was an homage to One Flew Over the Cuckoo's Nest, while Team Rock noted its additional similarity to the film Cocoon. The video ends with a brief choreographed dance routine, noted by Variety and ABC News as being similar to the routine done in Michael Jackson's video for the song "Thriller". The video was directed by band frontman Dave Grohl. The old age makeups were designed by Tony Gardner, and created by Alterian, Inc. The video was inspired by drummer Taylor Hawkins lamenting having to do promotional work for the song and album cycle while the band was beginning to look older; when Grohl told him that "it doesn't really matter", Hawkins proposed taking it in the opposite direction, and purposefully making themselves look older, inspiring Grohl to write up a treatment for the video.

== Composition and themes ==
The song is approximately five-and-a-half minutes long, and features a 40-second intro with just soft guitar notes and mellow vocals by Grohl. After the intro, the song erupts into a hard rock sound, featuring heavy, distorted guitar riffs, thunderous drums, and alternating melodically sung and screamed vocals by Grohl. The song features breakdowns similar to that found in heavy metal and noise rock music. A number of outlets described the song as one of the heaviest rock songs the band has ever released. Lyrically, the line "Wake up/run for your life with me" is urgently repeated through the song by Grohl.

== Reception ==
The song was generally well-received upon release, with many journalists praising the band for maintaining their high-energy rock sound with the song, while being over twenty years into their career. People praised the song for being "a return to full-speed-ahead rock. Like the best of Foo Fighters, it's hard and occasionally hilarious." Similarly, NPR praised the song for being "an enjoyably ludicrous bit of viral silliness" and concluded "'Run' itself is no joke: Eight (and perhaps soon to be nine) albums into his Foo Fighters career, Grohl still wails with the infectiously unhinged force of a kid a third his age." Loudwire named the song the eighth best hard rock song of 2017. The single had the highest first day sales of any prior singles for the band.

SPIN Magazine proclaimed "Run" a "thunderous lead single" and a "a galloping game of heavy-metal Red Light, Green Light".

The song received two Grammy Award nominations for Best Rock Song and Best Rock Performance.

== Personnel ==
Credits taken from Concrete and Gold liner notes.

Foo Fighters

- Dave Grohl – lead vocal, guitar, percussion
- Taylor Hawkins – drums, percussion
- Nate Mendel – bass, percussion
- Chris Shiflett – guitar, percussion
- Pat Smear – guitar, percussion
- Rami Jaffee – Mellotron, Casio SK-1, organ, percussion

Other musicians

- Greg Kurstin – piano

== Charts ==
=== Weekly charts ===
Chart (2017)	Peak position
Australia (ARIA)	53
Belgium (Ultratip Bubbling Under Flanders)	9
Canada Hot 100 (Billboard)	76
Canada Rock (Billboard)	2
Czech Republic Modern Rock (IFPI)	3
Finland Download (Latauslista)	11
Finland Airplay (Radiosoittolista)	60
France (SNEP)	106
Hungary (Single Top 40)	10
Mexico Ingles Airplay (Billboard)	28
Netherlands Single Tip (MegaCharts)	23
New Zealand Heatseekers (RMNZ)	2
Portugal (AFP)	85
Scotland Singles (Official Charts)	34
Spain (Promusicae)	41
Sweden Heatseeker (Sverigetopplistan)	19
Switzerland (Schweizer Hitparade)	79
UK Singles (Official Charts)	64
UK Rock & Metal (Official Charts)	1
US Digital Song Sales (Billboard)	43
US Bubbling Under Hot 100 (Billboard)	6
US Hot Rock & Alternative Songs (Billboard)	7
US Rock & Alternative Airplay (Billboard)	3

=== Year-end charts ===
Chart (2017)	Position
US Hot Rock Songs (Billboard)	29
US Rock Airplay (Billboard)	15

== Certifications ==
Region	Certification	Certified units/sales
Australia (ARIA)	Gold	35,000^{‡}
Canada (Music Canada)	Gold	40,000^{‡}
New Zealand (RMNZ)	Gold	15,000^{‡}
United Kingdom (BPI)	Silver	200,000^{‡}
^{‡} Sales+streaming figures based on certification alone.

== Awards ==
Year	Award	Results
2018	Grammy Award for Best Rock Song	Won
2018	Grammy Award for Best Rock Performance	Nominated
