= List of songs recorded by Foo Fighters =

This is a list of songs recorded by American rock band Foo Fighters.

== Released songs ==
=== Original compositions ===
Key
†	Indicates single release
‡	Indicates promotional single release

Name of song, release(s), producer(s), and additional notes.
Song	Songwriter(s)	Release(s)	Producer(s)	Notes	Ref.
"A320"	Dave Grohl, Taylor Hawkins, Nate Mendel, Franz Stahl	Godzilla: The Album	Foo Fighters	Featuring Benmont Tench and Petra Haden	
"Ain't It the Life"	Dave Grohl, Taylor Hawkins, Nate Mendel	There Is Nothing Left to Lose	Adam Kasper, Foo Fighters		
"All My Life"†	Dave Grohl, Taylor Hawkins, Nate Mendel, Chris Shiflett	One by One	Nick Raskulinecz, Foo Fighters		
"Alone + Easy Target"‡	Dave Grohl	Foo Fighters	Barrett Jones, Dave Grohl		
"Amen, Caveman"	Dave Grohl, Pat Smear, Chris Shiflett, Nate Mendel, Rami Jaffee, Ilan Rubin	Your Favorite Toy	Foo Fighters, Oliver Roman		
"Another Round"	Dave Grohl, Taylor Hawkins, Nate Mendel, Chris Shiflett	In Your Honor	Nick Raskulinecz, Foo Fighters	Featuring John Paul Jones and Danny Clinch	
"Arlandria"†	Dave Grohl, Taylor Hawkins, Nate Mendel, Chris Shiflett, Pat Smear	Wasting Light	Butch Vig		
"Arrows"	Dave Grohl, Taylor Hawkins, Nate Mendel, Chris Shiflett, Pat Smear, Rami Jaffee	Concrete and Gold	Greg Kurstin		
"Asking for a Friend" †	Dave Grohl, Pat Smear, Chris Shiflett, Nate Mendel, Rami Jaffee, Ilan Rubin	Your Favorite Toy	Foo Fighters, Oliver Roman		
"Aurora"	Dave Grohl, Taylor Hawkins, Nate Mendel	There Is Nothing Left to Lose	Adam Kasper, Foo Fighters		
"Back & Forth"	Dave Grohl, Taylor Hawkins, Nate Mendel, Chris Shiflett, Pat Smear	Wasting Light	Butch Vig	Featuring Butch Vig	
"Ballad of the Beaconsfield Miners"	Dave Grohl	Echoes, Silence, Patience & Grace	Gil Norton	Featuring Kaki King	
"Bangin'"		"The Pretender" single (Vinyl)	Gil Norton		
"Best of You" †	Dave Grohl, Taylor Hawkins, Nate Mendel, Chris Shiflett	In Your Honor	Nick Raskulinecz, Foo Fighters		
"Better Off"		Wasting Light (deluxe version)	Butch Vig		
"Beyond Me"	Dave Grohl, Rami Jaffee, Nate Mendel, Chris Shiflett, Pat Smear	But Here We Are	Greg Kurstin, Foo Fighters		
"Big Me" †	Dave Grohl	Foo Fighters	Barrett Jones, Dave Grohl		
"Breakout" †	Dave Grohl, Taylor Hawkins, Nate Mendel	There Is Nothing Left to Lose	Adam Kasper, Foo Fighters		
"Bridge Burning" †	Dave Grohl, Taylor Hawkins, Nate Mendel, Chris Shiflett, Pat Smear	Wasting Light	Butch Vig		
"Burn Away"	Dave Grohl, Taylor Hawkins, Nate Mendel, Chris Shiflett	One by One	Nick Raskulinecz, Foo Fighters		
"But Here We Are"	Dave Grohl, Rami Jaffee, Nate Mendel, Chris Shiflett, Pat Smear	But Here We Are	Greg Kurstin, Foo Fighters		
"But, Honestly"	Dave Grohl, Taylor Hawkins, Nate Mendel, Chris Shiflett	Echoes, Silence, Patience & Grace	Gil Norton		
"Caught in the Echo"	Dave Grohl, Pat Smear, Chris Shiflett, Nate Mendel, Rami Jaffee, Ilan Rubin	Your Favorite Toy	Foo Fighters, Oliver Roman		
"Chasing Birds"	Dave Grohl, Taylor Hawkins, Nate Mendel, Chris Shiflett, Pat Smear, Rami Jaffee	Medicine at Midnight	Greg Kurstin		
"Cheer Up, Boys (Your Make Up Is Running)" †	Dave Grohl, Taylor Hawkins, Nate Mendel, Chris Shiflett	Echoes, Silence, Patience & Grace	Gil Norton		
"Child Actor"	Dave Grohl, Pat Smear, Chris Shiflett, Nate Mendel, Rami Jaffee, Ilan Rubin	Your Favorite Toy	Foo Fighters, Oliver Roman		
"Cloudspotter"	Dave Grohl, Taylor Hawkins, Nate Mendel, Chris Shiflett, Pat Smear, Rami Jaffee	Medicine at Midnight	Greg Kurstin		
"Cold Day in the Sun" †	Taylor Hawkins	In Your Honor	Nick Raskulinecz, Foo Fighters	Drummer Taylor Hawkins sings lead	
"The Colour and the Shape"		The Colour and the Shape (French limited edition, iTunes edition & 10th anniversary edition) "Monkey Wrench" single (CD1 & Vinyl)	Gil Norton		
"Come Alive"	Dave Grohl, Taylor Hawkins, Nate Mendel, Chris Shiflett	Echoes, Silence, Patience & Grace	Gil Norton		
"Come Back"	Dave Grohl, Taylor Hawkins, Nate Mendel, Chris Shiflett	One by One	Nick Raskulinecz, Foo Fighters		
"Concrete and Gold"	Dave Grohl, Taylor Hawkins, Nate Mendel, Chris Shiflett, Pat Smear, Rami Jaffee	Concrete and Gold	Greg Kurstin		
"Congregation" †	Dave Grohl, Taylor Hawkins, Nate Mendel, Chris Shiflett, Pat Smear	Sonic Highways	Butch Vig, Foo Fighters	Featuring Zac Brown	
"Dear Lover"		The Colour and the Shape (10th anniversary edition) "My Hero" single (UK & Australian editions); Scream 2 soundtrack 00979725	Gil Norton		
"Dear Rosemary"	Dave Grohl, Taylor Hawkins, Nate Mendel, Chris Shiflett, Pat Smear	Wasting Light	Butch Vig	Featuring Bob Mould	
"The Deepest Blues Are Black"	Dave Grohl, Taylor Hawkins, Nate Mendel, Chris Shiflett	In Your Honor	Nick Raskulinecz, Foo Fighters		
"Dirty Water"	Dave Grohl, Taylor Hawkins, Nate Mendel, Chris Shiflett, Pat Smear, Rami Jaffee	Concrete and Gold	Greg Kurstin		
"Disenchanted Lullaby"	Dave Grohl, Taylor Hawkins, Nate Mendel, Chris Shiflett	One by One	Nick Raskulinecz, Foo Fighters		
"DOA" †	Dave Grohl, Taylor Hawkins, Nate Mendel, Chris Shiflett	In Your Honor	Nick Raskulinecz, Foo Fighters		
"Doll"	Dave Grohl, Pat Smear, Nate Mendel	The Colour and the Shape	Gil Norton		
"Empty Handed"	Dave Grohl	Songs From the Laundry Room	Barrett Jones		
"End Over End"	Dave Grohl, Taylor Hawkins, Nate Mendel, Chris Shiflett	In Your Honor	Nick Raskulinecz, Foo Fighters		
"Enough Space"	Dave Grohl	The Colour and the Shape	Gil Norton		
"Erase/Replace"	Dave Grohl, Taylor Hawkins, Nate Mendel, Chris Shiflett	Echoes, Silence, Patience & Grace	Gil Norton		
"Everlong" †	Dave Grohl	The Colour and the Shape	Gil Norton		
"Exhausted" ‡	Dave Grohl	Foo Fighters	Barrett Jones, Dave Grohl		
"The Feast and the Famine"	Dave Grohl, Taylor Hawkins, Nate Mendel, Chris Shiflett, Pat Smear	Sonic Highways	Butch Vig, Foo Fighters	Featuring Pete Stahl and Skeeter Thompson	
"February Stars"	Dave Grohl, Pat Smear, Nate Mendel	The Colour and the Shape	Gil Norton		
"FFL"		"Best of You" single (CD2); Five Songs and a Cover; 01050525	Nick Raskulinecz, Foo Fighters		
"Floaty"	Dave Grohl	Foo Fighters	Barrett Jones, Dave Grohl		
"For All the Cows" †	Dave Grohl	Foo Fighters	Barrett Jones, Dave Grohl		
"Fraternity"	Dave Grohl, Taylor Hawkins, Nate Mendel	There Is Nothing Left to Lose (Australian/Japanese edition) "Generator" single (European & 7 Inch versions); 00999925	Adam Kasper, Foo Fighters		
"Free Me"	Dave Grohl, Taylor Hawkins, Nate Mendel, Chris Shiflett	In Your Honor	Nick Raskulinecz, Foo Fighters		
"Friend of a Friend"	Dave Grohl	In Your Honor	Nick Raskulinecz, Foo Fighters	Previously recorded by Grohl on Pocketwatch; also played in the BBC on 30 April 1997 before receiving a studio version	
"Generator" †	Dave Grohl, Taylor Hawkins, Nate Mendel	There Is Nothing Left to Lose	Adam Kasper, Foo Fighters		
"Gimme Stitches"	Dave Grohl, Taylor Hawkins, Nate Mendel	There Is Nothing Left to Lose	Adam Kasper, Foo Fighters		
"The Glass" †	Dave Grohl, Rami Jaffee, Nate Mendel, Chris Shiflett, Pat Smear	But Here We Are	Greg Kurstin, Foo Fighters		
"Good Grief"	Dave Grohl	Foo Fighters	Barrett Jones, Dave Grohl		
"Halo"	Dave Grohl, Taylor Hawkins, Nate Mendel, Chris Shiflett	One by One	Nick Raskulinecz, Foo Fighters		
"Happy Ever After (Zero Hour)"	Dave Grohl, Taylor Hawkins, Nate Mendel, Chris Shiflett, Pat Smear, Rami Jaffee	Concrete and Gold	Greg Kurstin		
"Have It All" †	Dave Grohl, Taylor Hawkins, Nate Mendel, Chris Shiflett	One by One	Nick Raskulinecz, Foo Fighters		
"Headwires"	Dave Grohl, Taylor Hawkins, Nate Mendel	There Is Nothing Left to Lose	Adam Kasper, Foo Fighters		
"Hearing Voices"	Dave Grohl, Rami Jaffee, Nate Mendel, Chris Shiflett, Pat Smear	But Here We Are	Greg Kurstin, Foo Fighters		
"Hell"	Dave Grohl, Taylor Hawkins, Nate Mendel, Chris Shiflett	In Your Honor	Nick Raskulinecz, Foo Fighters		
"Hey, Johnny Park!"	Dave Grohl, Pat Smear, Nate Mendel	The Colour and the Shape	Gil Norton		
"Holding Poison"	Dave Grohl, Taylor Hawkins, Nate Mendel, Chris Shiflett, Pat Smear, Rami Jaffee	Medicine at Midnight	Greg Kurstin		
"Home"	Dave Grohl, Taylor Hawkins, Nate Mendel, Chris Shiflett	Echoes, Silence, Patience & Grace	Gil Norton		
"How I Miss You"		Foo Fighters (Special Oz Tour Edition) "Winnebago" single "I'll Stick Around" single "Big Me" single 00959525	Barrett Jones, Dave Grohl	Featuring Lisa Grohl and Mike Nelson	
"I Am a River"	Dave Grohl, Taylor Hawkins, Nate Mendel, Chris Shiflett, Pat Smear	Sonic Highways	Butch Vig, Foo Fighters	Featuring Kristeen Young and the Los Angeles Youth Orchestra	
"I Should Have Known"	Dave Grohl, Taylor Hawkins, Nate Mendel, Chris Shiflett, Pat Smear	Wasting Light	Butch Vig	Featuring Krist Novoselic, Rami Jaffee, and Jessy Greene	
"I'll Stick Around" †	Dave Grohl	Foo Fighters	Barrett Jones, Dave Grohl		
"If Ever"		"The Pretender" (2-track CD & Maxi CD) "Let It Die" (digital EP); 01070725	Gil Norton		
"If You Only Knew"	Dave Grohl, Pat Smear, Chris Shiflett, Nate Mendel, Rami Jaffee, Ilan Rubin	Your Favorite Toy	Foo Fighters, Oliver Roman		
"In the Clear"	Dave Grohl, Taylor Hawkins, Nate Mendel, Chris Shiflett, Pat Smear	Sonic Highways	Butch Vig, Foo Fighters	Featuring the Preservation Hall Jazz Band	
"In Your Honor"	Dave Grohl, Taylor Hawkins, Nate Mendel, Chris Shiflett	In Your Honor	Nick Raskulinecz, Foo Fighters		
"Iron Rooster"	Dave Grohl, Pat Smear, Chris Shiflett, Nate Mendel, Taylor Hawkins	Saint Cecilia	Foo Fighters	Featuring Gary Clark, Jr.	
"La Dee Da"	Dave Grohl, Taylor Hawkins, Nate Mendel, Chris Shiflett, Pat Smear, Rami Jaffee	Concrete and Gold	Greg Kurstin		
"The Last Song"	Dave Grohl, Taylor Hawkins, Nate Mendel, Chris Shiflett	In Your Honor	Nick Raskulinecz, Foo Fighters		
"Learn to Fly" †	Dave Grohl, Taylor Hawkins, Nate Mendel	There Is Nothing Left to Lose	Adam Kasper, Foo Fighters		
"Let It Die" †	Dave Grohl, Taylor Hawkins, Nate Mendel, Chris Shiflett	Echoes, Silence, Patience & Grace	Gil Norton		
"The Line"	Dave Grohl, Taylor Hawkins, Nate Mendel, Chris Shiflett, Pat Smear, Rami Jaffee	Concrete and Gold	Greg Kurstin		
"Live-In Skin"	Dave Grohl, Taylor Hawkins, Nate Mendel	There Is Nothing Left to Lose	Adam Kasper, Foo Fighters		
"Lonely as You"	Dave Grohl, Taylor Hawkins, Nate Mendel, Chris Shiflett	One by One	Nick Raskulinecz, Foo Fighters		
"Long Road to Ruin" †	Dave Grohl, Taylor Hawkins, Nate Mendel, Chris Shiflett	Echoes, Silence, Patience & Grace	Gil Norton		
"Love Dies Young" †	Dave Grohl, Taylor Hawkins, Nate Mendel, Chris Shiflett, Pat Smear, Rami Jaffee	Medicine at Midnight	Greg Kurstin		
"Low" †	Dave Grohl, Taylor Hawkins, Nate Mendel, Chris Shiflett	One by One	Nick Raskulinecz, Foo Fighters		
"Make a Bet"		"Learn to Fly" (CD2) "Next Year" EP; 00999925	Gil Norton	Later rerecorded as "Win or Lose"	
"Make It Right"	Dave Grohl, Taylor Hawkins, Nate Mendel, Chris Shiflett, Pat Smear, Rami Jaffee	Concrete and Gold	Greg Kurstin		
"Making a Fire" †	Dave Grohl, Taylor Hawkins, Nate Mendel, Chris Shiflett, Pat Smear, Rami Jaffee	Medicine at Midnight	Greg Kurstin		
"Marigold"	Dave Grohl	Skin and Bones	Gil Norton	Previously recorded by Grohl as Late! and Nirvana; recorded in August 2006 at Pantages Theatre	
"A Matter of Time"	Dave Grohl, Taylor Hawkins, Nate Mendel, Chris Shiflett, Pat Smear	Wasting Light	Butch Vig		
"Medicine at Midnight"	Dave Grohl, Taylor Hawkins, Nate Mendel, Chris Shiflett, Pat Smear, Rami Jaffee	Medicine at Midnight	Greg Kurstin		
"Miracle" ‡	Dave Grohl, Taylor Hawkins, Nate Mendel, Chris Shiflett	In Your Honor	Nick Raskulinecz, Foo Fighters	Featuring John Paul Jones and Petra Haden	
"Miss the Misery"	Dave Grohl, Taylor Hawkins, Nate Mendel, Chris Shiflett, Pat Smear	Wasting Light	Butch Vig	Featuring Fee Waybill	
"Monkey Wrench" †	Dave Grohl, Pat Smear, Nate Mendel	The Colour and the Shape	Gil Norton		
"My Hero" †	Dave Grohl, Pat Smear, Nate Mendel	The Colour and the Shape	Gil Norton		
"My Poor Brain"	Dave Grohl, Pat Smear, Nate Mendel	The Colour and the Shape	Gil Norton		
"M.I.A."	Dave Grohl, Taylor Hawkins, Nate Mendel	There Is Nothing Left to Lose	Adam Kasper, Foo Fighters		
"The Neverending Sigh"	Dave Grohl, Pat Smear, Chris Shiflett, Nate Mendel, Taylor Hawkins	Saint Cecilia	Foo Fighters	Originally called "7 Corners" (see "Unreleased Tracks")	
"New Way Home"	Dave Grohl, Pat Smear, Nate Mendel	The Colour and the Shape	Gil Norton		
"Next Year" †	Dave Grohl, Taylor Hawkins, Nate Mendel	There Is Nothing Left to Lose	Adam Kasper, Foo Fighters		
"Normal"		"Times Like These" single (CD2) & EP; 00020225	Foo Fighters, Adam Kasper		
"Nothing At All"	Dave Grohl, Rami Jaffee, Nate Mendel, Chris Shiflett, Pat Smear	But Here We Are	Greg Kurstin, Foo Fighters		
"No Son of Mine" †	Dave Grohl, Taylor Hawkins, Nate Mendel, Chris Shiflett, Pat Smear, Rami Jaffee	Medicine at Midnight	Kurstin, Greg; Greg Kurstin		
"No Way Back" †	Dave Grohl, Taylor Hawkins, Nate Mendel, Chris Shiflett	In Your Honor	Nick Raskulinecz, Foo Fighters		
"Of All People"	Dave Grohl, Pat Smear, Chris Shiflett, Nate Mendel, Rami Jaffee, Ilan Rubin	Your Favorite Toy	Foo Fighters, Oliver Roman		
"Oh, George"	Dave Grohl	Foo Fighters	Barrett Jones, Dave Grohl		
"The One" †		Orange County soundtrack "All My Life" single (CD2) "Times Like These" EP; One by One (Limited Edition Bonus DVD); 00020225	Foo Fighters, Adam Kasper		
"On the Mend"	Dave Grohl, Taylor Hawkins, Nate Mendel, Chris Shiflett	In Your Honor	Nick Raskulinecz, Foo Fighters		
"Once & for All" (Demo)		Echoes, Silence, Patience & Grace (Japanese & UK editions)	Foo Fighters		
"Outside" †	Dave Grohl, Taylor Hawkins, Nate Mendel, Chris Shiflett, Pat Smear	Sonic Highways	Butch Vig, Foo Fighters	Featuring Joe Walsh and Chris Goss	
"Overdrive"	Dave Grohl, Taylor Hawkins, Nate Mendel, Chris Shiflett	One by One	Nick Raskulinecz, Foo Fighters		
"Over and Out"	Dave Grohl, Taylor Hawkins, Nate Mendel, Chris Shiflett	In Your Honor	Nick Raskulinecz, Foo Fighters		
"Podunk"		Foo Fighters (Special Oz Tour Edition) "This Is a Call" single "Winnebago" single "Big Me" single 00959525	Barrett Jones, Dave Grohl		
"The Pretender" †	Dave Grohl, Taylor Hawkins, Nate Mendel, Chris Shiflett	Echoes, Silence, Patience & Grace	Gil Norton		
"Razor"	Dave Grohl	In Your Honor	Nick Raskulinecz, Foo Fighters	Featuring Josh Homme	
"Rescued" †	Dave Grohl, Rami Jaffee, Nate Mendel, Chris Shiflett, Pat Smear	But Here We Are	Greg Kurstin, Foo Fighters		
"Resolve" †	Dave Grohl, Taylor Hawkins, Nate Mendel, Chris Shiflett	In Your Honor	Nick Raskulinecz, Foo Fighters		
"Rest"	Dave Grohl, Rami Jaffee, Nate Mendel, Chris Shiflett, Pat Smear	But Here We Are	Greg Kurstin, Foo Fighters		
"Rope" †	Dave Grohl, Taylor Hawkins, Nate Mendel, Chris Shiflett, Pat Smear	Wasting Light	Butch Vig		
"Run" †	Dave Grohl, Taylor Hawkins, Nate Mendel, Chris Shiflett, Pat Smear, Rami Jaffee	Concrete and Gold	Greg Kurstin		
"Saint Cecilia"	Dave Grohl, Pat Smear, Chris Shiflett, Nate Mendel, Taylor Hawkins	Saint Cecilia	Foo Fighters	Featuring Ben Kweller	
"Savior Breath"	Dave Grohl, Pat Smear, Chris Shiflett, Nate Mendel, Taylor Hawkins	Saint Cecilia	Foo Fighters		
"Sean"	Dave Grohl, Pat Smear, Chris Shiflett, Nate Mendel, Taylor Hawkins	Saint Cecilia	Foo Fighters		
"Seda"	Dave Grohl	Echoes, Silence, Patience & Grace (Japanese & iTunes edition) "Long Road to Ruin" single (2-track CD); 01070725	Gil Norton		
"See You"	Dave Grohl, Pat Smear, Nate Mendel	The Colour and the Shape	Gil Norton	Featuring Lance Bangs, Chris Bilheimer and Ryan Boesch	
"Shake Your Blood" (Live at Hyde Park)	Lemmy, Dave Grohl	Hyde Park	Nick Raskulinecz	Written by Dave Grohl and Lemmy; previously recorded by Grohl and Lemmy with Probot; recorded June 17, 2006, at Hyde Park in London; featuring Lemmy	
"Shame Shame" †	Dave Grohl, Taylor Hawkins, Nate Mendel, Chris Shiflett, Pat Smear, Rami Jaffee	Medicine at Midnight	Greg Kurstin		
"Show Me How" †	Dave Grohl, Rami Jaffee, Nate Mendel, Chris Shiflett, Pat Smear	But Here We Are	Greg Kurstin, Foo Fighters	Features Dave Grohl's daughter, Violet Grohl, on vocals	
"The Sign"	Dave Grohl, Taylor Hawkins, Nate Mendel, Chris Shiflett	In Your Honor (UK, Vinyl & iTunes editions)	Nick Raskulinecz, Foo Fighters		
"Skin and Bones"	Dave Grohl	"DOA" single (CD2); Five Songs and a Cover; Skin and Bones; Greatest Hits	Foo Fighters; Gil Norton (live)	Recorded on 2005 at the T in the Park festival backstage; Skin and Bones version (featured on Greatest Hits) recorded in August 2006 at the Pantages Theater in Los Angeles	
"The Sky Is a Neighborhood" †	Dave Grohl, Taylor Hawkins, Nate Mendel, Chris Shiflett, Pat Smear, Rami Jaffee	Concrete and Gold	Greg Kurstin		
"Soldier"		7-Inches For Planned Parenthood	Foo Fighters		
"Spit Shine"	Dave Grohl, Pat Smear, Chris Shiflett, Nate Mendel, Rami Jaffee, Ilan Rubin	Your Favorite Toy	Foo Fighters, Oliver Roman		
"Snoof" (live at the Spektrum)		One by One (Special Norwegian Edition)	Nick Raskulinecz, Foo Fighters	Grohl telling a story about Chewing tobacco, which he thinks is called "Snoof" in Norwegian; recorded on December 4, 2002, at the Oslo Spektrum	
"Something from Nothing"†	Dave Grohl, Taylor Hawkins, Nate Mendel, Chris Shiflett, Pat Smear	Sonic Highways	Butch Vig, Foo Fighters	Featuring Rick Nielsen	
"Spill"		"Best of You" single (7" vinyl); 01050525	Nick Raskulinecz, Foo Fighters		
"Stacked Actors" †	Dave Grohl, Taylor Hawkins, Nate Mendel	There Is Nothing Left to Lose	Adam Kasper, Foo Fighters		
"Statues"	Dave Grohl, Taylor Hawkins, Nate Mendel, Chris Shiflett	Echoes, Silence, Patience & Grace	Gil Norton		
"Still"	Dave Grohl, Taylor Hawkins, Nate Mendel, Chris Shiflett	In Your Honor	Nick Raskulinecz, Foo Fighters		
"Stranger Things Have Happened"	Dave Grohl	Echoes, Silence, Patience & Grace	Gil Norton		
"Subterranean"	Dave Grohl, Taylor Hawkins, Nate Mendel, Chris Shiflett, Pat Smear	Sonic Highways	Butch Vig, Foo Fighters	Featuring Ben Gibbard and Barrett Jones	
"Summer's End" ‡	Dave Grohl, Taylor Hawkins, Nate Mendel, Chris Shiflett	Echoes, Silence, Patience & Grace	Gil Norton		
"Sunday Rain"	Dave Grohl, Taylor Hawkins, Nate Mendel, Chris Shiflett, Pat Smear, Rami Jaffee	Concrete and Gold	Greg Kurstin	Drummer Taylor Hawkins sings lead Paul McCartney plays drums	
"The Teacher" †	Dave Grohl, Rami Jaffee, Nate Mendel, Chris Shiflett, Pat Smear	But Here We Are	Greg Kurstin, Foo Fighters		
"These Days" †	Dave Grohl, Taylor Hawkins, Nate Mendel, Chris Shiflett, Pat Smear	Wasting Light	Butch Vig		
"This Is a Call" †	Dave Grohl	Foo Fighters	Barrett Jones, Dave Grohl		
"Times Like These" †	Dave Grohl, Taylor Hawkins, Nate Mendel, Chris Shiflett	One by One	Nick Raskulinecz, Foo Fighters		
"Tired of You"	Dave Grohl, Taylor Hawkins, Nate Mendel, Chris Shiflett	One by One	Adam Kasper, Foo Fighters	Featuring Brian May	
"Today's Song" †		Non-album single	Tribute to former band members		
"T-Shirt"	Dave Grohl, Taylor Hawkins, Nate Mendel, Chris Shiflett, Pat Smear, Rami Jaffee	Concrete and Gold	Greg Kurstin		
"Unconditional"	Dave Grohl, Pat Smear, Chris Shiflett, Nate Mendel, Rami Jaffee, Ilan Rubin	Your Favorite Toy	Foo Fighters, Oliver Roman		
"Under You" †	Dave Grohl, Rami Jaffee, Nate Mendel, Chris Shiflett, Pat Smear	But Here We Are	Greg Kurstin, Foo Fighters		
"Up In Arms"	Dave Grohl, Pat Smear, Nate Mendel	The Colour and the Shape	Gil Norton		
"Virginia Moon"	Dave Grohl, Taylor Hawkins, Nate Mendel, Chris Shiflett	In Your Honor	Nick Raskulinecz, Foo Fighters	Featuring Norah Jones	
"Waiting on a War" †	Dave Grohl, Taylor Hawkins, Nate Mendel, Chris Shiflett, Pat Smear, Rami Jaffee	Medicine at Midnight	Greg Kurstin		
"Walk" †	Dave Grohl, Taylor Hawkins, Nate Mendel, Chris Shiflett, Pat Smear	Wasting Light	Butch Vig		
"Walking a Line"		One by One (Special Limited Edition)	Adam Kasper, Foo Fighters	Featuring Krist Novoselic	
"Walking After You" †	Dave Grohl	The Colour and the Shape; The X-Files: The Album (single)	Gil Norton (album); Jerry Harrison (single)	Album version features only Grohl, X-Files and single version is a full-band re-recording featuring Jerry Harrison and Craig Wedren	
"Wattershed"	Dave Grohl	Foo Fighters	Barrett Jones, Dave Grohl		
"Weenie Beenie"	Dave Grohl	Foo Fighters	Barrett Jones, Dave Grohl		
"What Did I Do?/God As My Witness"	Dave Grohl, Taylor Hawkins, Nate Mendel, Chris Shiflett, Pat Smear	Sonic Highways	Butch Vig, Foo Fighters	Featuring Gary Clark, Jr.	
"What If I Do?"	Dave Grohl, Taylor Hawkins, Nate Mendel, Chris Shiflett	In Your Honor	Nick Raskulinecz, Foo Fighters		
"Wheels" †	Dave Grohl, Taylor Hawkins, Nate Mendel, Chris Shiflett	Greatest Hits	Butch Vig, Foo Fighters		
"White Limo" ‡	Dave Grohl, Taylor Hawkins, Nate Mendel, Chris Shiflett, Pat Smear	Wasting Light	Butch Vig	Originally called "Flagger" (see "Unreleased Tracks")	
"Win or Lose"		"The One" single Out Cold soundtrack "All My Life" single (CD1); 00020225	Nick Raskulinecz, Foo Fighters	Rerecording of "Make a Bet"	
"Wind Up"	Dave Grohl, Pat Smear, Nate Mendel	The Colour and the Shape	Gil Norton		
"Window"	Dave Grohl, Pat Smear, Chris Shiflett, Nate Mendel, Rami Jaffee, Ilan Rubin	Your Favorite Toy	Foo Fighters, Oliver Roman		
"Winnebago" ‡	Dave Grohl, Geoff Turner	Foo Fighters (Special Oz Tour Edition) "Exhausted" single "This Is a Call" single "Big Me" single 00959525	Barrett Jones, Dave Grohl	Previously recorded by Grohl with Late!	
"Word Forward" ‡	Dave Grohl, Taylor Hawkins, Nate Mendel, Chris Shiflett	"Wheels" single Greatest Hits	Butch Vig, Foo Fighters		
"World" (demo)		Five Songs and a Cover "Resolve" single (CD2); 01050525	Nick Raskulinecz, Foo Fighters		
"X-Static"	Dave Grohl	Foo Fighters	Barrett Jones, Dave Grohl	Featuring Greg Dulli	
"Your Favorite Toy" †	Dave Grohl, Pat Smear, Chris Shiflett, Nate Mendel, Rami Jaffee, Ilan Rubin	Your Favorite Toy	Foo Fighters, Oliver Roman	Featuring Harper Grohl	

=== Cover versions ===
Song	Release(s)	Original artist	Writer(s)	Notes
"Bad Reputation"	Medium Rare	Thin Lizzy	Brian Downey, Scott Gorham and Phil Lynott	
"Baker Street" (BBC sessions)‡	"Requiem" single "My Hero" single (UK & Japanese editions) "Next Year" single (CD2); The Colour and the Shape (Australian tour pack, Limited edition European bonus EP & 10th anniversary edition); Medium Rare	Gerry Rafferty	Gerry Rafferty	Recorded on April 30, 1997, at Maida Vale Studios in London for The Evening Session
"Band on the Run"	"Cheer Up, Boys (Your Make Up Is Running)" single Medium Rare; Radio 1 Established 1967	Wings	Paul and Linda McCartney	Recorded for BBC Radio 1 Rock Show
"Born on the Bayou"	"Resolve" single (CD2); 01050525	Creedence Clearwater Revival	John Fogerty	
"Danny Says"	One by One (Special Limited Edition) "All My Life" single (CD2); Medium Rare	Ramones	Douglas Colvin, Jeffry Hyman and John Cummings	Featuring Gregg Bissonette; guitarist Chris Shiflett sings lead
"Darling Nikki" ‡	"Have It All" single Medium Rare (Vinyl)	Prince and The Revolution	Prince	
"Down in the Park" ‡	Songs in the Key of X The Colour and the Shape (Australian tour pack, Limited edition European bonus EP & 10th anniversary edition) "Requiem" single "Monkey Wrench" single (CD2) "Everlong" single (Australian limited edition) "My Hero" single (Japanese edition)	Gary Numan and the Tubeway Army	Gary Numan	Misspelled on single as "Down in the Dark"; only four copies were pressed
"Drive Me Wild" (BBC sessions)	The Colour and the Shape (Australian tour pack, Limited edition European bonus EP & 10th anniversary edition) "Requiem" single "Everlong" single (CD1) "My Hero" single (Japanese edition)	Vanity 6	Prince	Recorded on April 30, 1997, at Maida Vale Studios in London for The Evening Session
"Gas Chamber"	"Big Me" single Medium Rare; Rock Against Bush, Vol. 2	Angry Samoans	Mike Saunders and Gregg Turner	Version present in the Big Me single and Medium Rare is the BBC sessions version, recorded on 23 November 1995
"Have a Cigar"	Mission: Impossible II soundtrack "Learn to Fly" single "Next Year" EP; Greatest Hits (Amazon.com version); Medium Rare	Pink Floyd	Roger Waters	Featuring Brian May; Drummer Taylor Hawkins sings lead
"Hallo Spaceboy" (live at David Bowie's 50th Birthday Bash)	Birthday Celebration	David Bowie	David Bowie, Brian Eno and Reeves Gabrels	Recorded on 8 January 1997 at Madison Square Garden with Bowie, Mike Garson, Gabrels, Zachary Alford and Gail Ann Dorsey; Bowie and his band played "Seven Years in Tibet" with Grohl after finishing Hallo Spaceboy.
"Hocus Pocus" (Live at Wembley Stadium)	Live at Wembley Stadium	Focus	Jan Akkerman and Thijs van Leer	Recorded on June 7, 2008, at Wembley Stadium in London, played with "Stacked Actors" as its lead-in
"Holiday in Cambodia" (live at VMAs)	"Long Road to Ruin" single (Vinyl); 01070725	Dead Kennedys	Jello Biafra and John Greenway	Recorded on September 9, 2007, at the Hot Pink Suite of the Palms Casino Resort during the 2007 MTV Video Music Awards; featuring Serj Tankian
"I Feel Free"	"DOA" single (CD1 & CD2); Five Songs and a Cover	Cream	Jack Bruce and Pete Brown	Drummer Taylor Hawkins sings lead
"I'm in Love with a German Film Star"	"Best of You" single (CD1); 01050525	The Passions	Barbara Gogan, Clive Timperley, David Wardill and Richard Williams	
"Iron and Stone"	"Learn to Fly" single (CD1) "Breakout" (CD1 & Japanese version); 00999925	The Obsessed	The Obsessed	
"Keep the Car Running" (live at Concorde 2) ‡	Long Road to Ruin (Maxi CD) "Let It Die" (digital EP); 01070725	Arcade Fire	Arcade Fire	Recorded on August 17, 2007, at the Concorde 2 in London
"Kiss the Bottle"	"Best of You" (CD2); 01050525	Jawbreaker	Blake Schwarzenbach, Chris Bauermeister and Adam Pfahler	Guitarist Chris Shiflett sings lead
"Life of Illusion"	One by One (Special Limited Edition) "Times Like These" single (CD1 & Vinyl) & EP	Joe Walsh	Joe Walsh and Kenny Passarelli	Drummer Taylor Hawkins sings lead
"Kids in America"	Songs From the Laundry Room	Kim Wilde	Marty Wilde and Ricky Wilde	
"More Than a Woman"	Hail Satin	Bee Gees	Barry Gibb, Maurice Gibb and Robin Gibb	Released as "Dee Gees"
"Never Talking to You Again" (live at Colour Line Arena)	"Low" single (UK CD1, Australian version & 7 Inch); Medium Rare	Hüsker Dü	Grant Hart	Recorded on December 1, 2002, at the Colour Line Arena in Hamburg, Germany
"Night Fever"	Hail Satin	Bee Gees	Barry Gibb, Maurice Gibb and Robin Gibb.	Released as "Dee Gees"
"Ozone"	Foo Fighters (Special Oz Tour Edition) "Winnebago" single "I'll Stick Around" single "For All the Cows" single "Big Me" single	Ace Frehley	Ace Frehley	
"Planet Claire" (live at The Supper Club)	"Times Like These" single (CD1) & EP; 00020225	The B-52's	Fred Schneider and Keith Strickland	Recorded on October 31, 2002, at The Supper Club in New York City; featuring Fred Schneider
"Ramble On" (Live at Wembley Stadium)	Live at Wembley Stadium	Led Zeppelin	Jimmy Page and Robert Plant	Recorded on June 7, 2008, at Wembley Stadium in London; featuring Jimmy Page and John Paul Jones
"Requiem" (BBC sessions)‡	The Colour and the Shape (Australian tour pack, Limited edition European bonus EP & 10th anniversary edition) "Everlong" single (CD2) "My Hero" single (Japanese edition)	Killing Joke	Jaz Coleman	Recorded on April 30, 1997, at Maida Vale Studios in London for The Evening Session
"Rock and Roll" (Live at Wembley Stadium)	Live at Wembley Stadium	Led Zeppelin	Jimmy Page, Robert Plant, John Paul Jones and John Bonham	Recorded on June 7, 2008, at Wembley Stadium in London; featuring Jimmy Page and John Paul Jones; Taylor Hawkins sings lead
"Run Rudolph Run"	Run Rudolph Run	Chuck Berry	Chuck Berry, Johnny Marks, Marvin Brodie	
"Shadow Dancing"	Hail Satin	Andy Gibb	Andy Gibb, Barry Gibb, Maurice Gibb and Robin Gibb	Released as "Dee Gees"
"Sister Europe"	One by One (Special Limited Edition) "All My Life" single (CD1, 7 Inch & Japanese edition); 00020225	Psychedelic Furs	Tim Butler, Richard Butler, Nicholas Morris, Paul Davey, James Kilburn, John Ashton, Vince Ely, Duncan Kilburn, Roger Morris	
"This Will Be Our Year"	Medium Rare	The Zombies	Chris White	
"Tie Your Mother Down" (Live at Hyde Park)	Hyde Park	Queen	Brian May	Recorded June 17, 2006, at Hyde Park in London; featuring Brian May and Roger Taylor; Taylor Hawkins sings lead
"Tragedy"	Hail Satin	Bee Gees	Barry Gibb, Maurice Gibb and Robin Gibb	Released as "Dee Gees"
"Young Man Blues" (live at Rock Honors)	Medium Rare	Mose Allison	Mose Allison	Recorded on July 12, 2008, at the Pauley Pavilion during the VH1 Rock Honors 2008
"You Should Be Dancing"	Hail Satin	Bee Gees	Barry Gibb, Maurice Gibb and Robin Gibb	Released as "Dee Gees"; also performed in Jo Whiley's BBC Radio 2 show

== Unreleased tracks ==
Song	Composer	Producer	Sessions	Notes
"7 Corners"	Dave Grohl, Nate Mendel and Taylor Hawkins	Adam Kasper; Nick Raskulinecz; Butch Vig, Foo Fighters	There Is Nothing Left to Lose In Your Honor Wasting Light	7 Corners has been used as a working title for other songs. Released in 2015 as 'The Neverending Sigh'
"867-5309/Jenny"	Alex Call and Jim Keller		Rockline	Tommy Tutone cover; recorded on March 20, 2000, in Hollywood
"Baby Hold On"	Jimmy Lyon, Eddie Money	Adam Kasper, Foo Fighters	There Is Nothing Left to Lose B-Sides	Eddie Money cover; recorded in February 2000, was meant to be used as a B-side in one of the then upcoming singles for There Is Nothing Left to Lose; part of the song was played acoustically for the radio program Rockline
"Back in Treatment"	Dave Grohl	Barrett Jones	May 1992 – 1993	
"Bells"	Dave Grohl, Nate Mendel, Taylor Hawkins and Chris Shiflett	Gil Norton	Echoes, Silence, Patience & Grace	
"Blackbird"	Paul McCartney		Rockline	The Beatles cover; recorded on March 20, 2000, in Hollywood
"Butterflies" (Also Known As "Red Pellet Guns" and "Not a Fool")	Dave Grohl	Dave Grohl and Barrett Jones; Barrett Jones	May 1992 – 1993; Foo Fighters; Songs in the Key of X	Two versions were recorded on the Foo Fighters and Songs in the Key of X sessions, but neither were released
"Comfortable"	Dave Grohl, Nate Mendel, Pat Smear, and William Goldsmith	Barrett Jones	Foo Fighters; Songs in the Key of X	Known to be similar to the b side "If Ever"
"Dark + Lovely"	Dave Grohl, Nate Mendel, Chris Shifflett, and Taylor Hawkins	Nick Raskuliencez, Foo Fighters	In Your Honor	
"Flagger"	Dave Grohl, Nate Mendel, Chris Shifflett, and Taylor Hawkins	Nick Raskuliencez, Foo Fighters; Gil Norton, Foo Fighter	In Your Honor Echoes, Silence, Patience, & Grace	Later released as "White Limo" on Wasting Light.
"Fuck Around"	Dave Grohl, Nate Mendel and Taylor Hawkins	Adam Kasper, Foo Fighters	There Is Nothing Left to Lose	
"I Predict a Riot"	Ricky Wilson, Andrew White, Simon Rix, Nicholas M. Baines, and Nick Hodgson		BBC	Kaiser Chiefs cover; recorded on August 23, 2005, at the Maida Vale Studios in London for The Jo Whiley Show
"I'm Alone Again"	Dave Grohl, Pat Smear, Nate Mendel and William Goldsmith	Barrett Jones	Songs in the Key of X	
"In Silence"	Dave Grohl, Nate Mendel, Taylor Hawkins and Chris Shiflett	Gil Norton	Echoes, Silence, Patience & Grace	
"Invisible Sun"	Sting	Adam Kasper, Foo Fighters	There Is Nothing Left to Lose B-Sides	The Police cover; recorded in February 2000, meant to be used as a B-side in one of the then upcoming singles for "There Is Nothing Left to Lose"
"Jet"	Paul McCartney and Linda McCartney	Adam Kasper, Foo Fighters	There Is Nothing Left to Lose B-Sides	Wings cover; Recorded in February 2000, meant to be used on a tribute album to Paul McCartney
"Keep It Clean"	Dave Grohl, Nate Mendel, Taylor Hawkins, Chris Shiflett and Pat Smear	Foo Fighters	2011	Recorded on Art Farm Studios in Drabenderhöhe, Wiehl, Germany. Featuring Rami Jaffee. Used for the "Hot Buns" video promoting the Wasting Light tour, and played in Kansas City, Missouri, as a protest against the Westboro Baptist Church. The studio recording can be found on the Foo Fighters website under 'Foo Fighters FM' on station 94.1.
"Knucklehead"	Dave Grohl, Nate Mendel, Taylor Hawkins and Chris Shiflett	Adam Kasper	One by One	Recorded during the One by One sessions with Brian May
"Lonely Boy"	Andrew Gold	Adam Kasper, Foo Fighters	There Is Nothing Left to Lose B-Sides	Andrew Gold cover; Recorded in February 2000, meant to be used as a B-side in one of the then upcoming singles for There Is Nothing Left to Lose
"Lyla"	Noel Gallagher		BBC	Oasis cover; recorded on August 23, 2005, at the Maida Vale Studios in London for The Jo Whiley Show
"Sognare ancora"	Dave Grohl, Taylor Hawkins and Vasco Rossi	Saverio Principini	Unreleased (2014)	
"Mountain of You"	Dave Grohl	Barrett Jones	May 1992 – 1993	
"New Wave"	Dave Grohl, Nate Mendel, and Taylor Hawkins	Adam Kasper, Foo Fighters	There Is Nothing Left to Lose	
"That Ass"	Dave Grohl, Nate Mendel, Taylor Hawkins and Chris Shiflett	Nick Raskulinecz, Foo Fighters	In Your Honor	
"Try Me On"	Dave Grohl, Nate Mendel and Taylor Hawkins	Adam Kasper, Foo Fighters	There Is Nothing Left to Lose	
"Wasting Time"	Dave Grohl	Barrett Jones, Dave Grohl	May 1992	
"Watered It Down"	Dave Grohl	Barrett Jones, Dave Grohl	May 1992	
"Watter-Fred"	Dave Grohl		Rockline	Acoustic version of "Wattershed" performed on March 18, 1996, at the Clatter And Din Studios in Seattle for the Rockline program that tells a story about going to Vancouver in the voice of Fred Schneider
"With Arms Wide Open"	Scott Stapp, Mark Tremonti and Dave Grohl		KRock	Creed cover; recorded on November 13, 2000, in New York; Grohl re-wrote most of the lyrics and emphasised his voice, trying to mimic Stapp's voice
"What I'm About"	Dave Grohl	Barrett Jones	May 1992 – 1993	

== Live songs ==
Song	Notes
"Chicken Derby"	Early version of "My Poor Brain"
"Damn You, Damn Everyone"	Played live once, written during the band's 1998 East Coast USA Tour
"Double Drum Intro"	A part of the song can be heard in the beginning of the studio version of "My Hero"
"Gun Beside My Bed"	Early version of "Overdrive", played live once

=== Covers ===
Song	Original artist	Writer(s)	Notes
"Ace of Spades"	Motörhead	Lemmy, Phil "Philthy Animal" Taylor, Eddie Clarke	Played live once, featured Phil Campbell on guitar
"Ain't Talkin' 'bout Love"	Van Halen	Alex Van Halen, Eddie Van Halen, David Lee Roth, Michael Anthony	
"Back in Black"	AC/DC	Angus Young, Malcolm Young and Brian Johnson	Played live once, featured Jack Black on vocals
"Bad Reputation"	Joan Jett and the Blackhearts	Joan Jett, Ritchie Cordell, Kenny Laguna and Marty Joe Kupersmith	Featured Joan Jett on vocals and guitar
"Bargain"	The Who	Pete Townshend	2007 VMAs show featured Gaz Coombes on vocals
"Breakdown"	Tom Petty and the Heartbreakers	Tom Petty	
"Bridge of Sighs"	Robin Trower	Robin Trower	Played live twice
"Bullet with Butterfly Wings"	The Smashing Pumpkins	Billy Corgan	
"Cactus"	Pixies	Black Francis	Played live once, first verse only due to Grohl not remembering the rest of the song
"Carry on Wayward Son"	Kansas	Kerry Livgren	Played live twice, both versions featured someone else on vocals because Grohl didn't know the lyrics
"Communication Breakdown"	Led Zeppelin	John Bonham, John Paul Jones and Jimmy Page	Memorial Stadium show featured Krist Novoselic on bass and Barrett Jones on vocals
"Custard Pie"	Led Zeppelin	Jimmy Page and Robert Plant	
"Feel Good Hit of the Summer"	Queens of the Stone Age	Josh Homme and Nick Oliveri	
"Freedom of '76"	Ween	Ween	Played live once; featured Gene Ween on vocals
"Head over Heels"	Tears for Fears	Roland Orzabal, Curt Smith	Played live once
"Hot in Herre"	Nelly	Nelly, Pharrell Williams, Chad Hugo, Chuck Brown	
"I Love Rock 'n' Roll"	Arrows	Alan Merrill and Jake Hooker	Featured Joan Jett on vocals
"I'm Eighteen"	Alice Cooper	Alice Cooper, Michael Bruce, Glen Buxton, Dennis Dunaway and Neal Smith	02/07/11 show featured Cooper on vocals
"In the Flesh?"	Pink Floyd	Roger Waters	Taylor Hawkins sings lead
"Let There Be Rock"	AC/DC	Angus Young, Malcolm Young, and Bon Scott	Performed live on BBC Radio 1's Live Lounge and released on the album BBC Radio 1’s Live Lounge 2017
"Insects Rule"	Brendan Benson	Brendan Benson and Jason Falkner	Played live twice
"Lovin', Touchin', Squeezin'"	Journey	Steve Perry	Played live twice; both versions featured Craig Wedren on vocals
"Message in a Bottle"	The Police	Sting	Played live twice
"Nookie"	Limp Bizkit	Fred Durst, Sam Rivers, John Otto, Wes Borland	Played live twice
"Now I'm Here"	Queen	Brian May	November 1999 show featured May and Roger Taylor
"Purple Rain"	Prince and The Revolution	Prince	First verse only; guitarist Pat Smear sang lead; Memorial Stadium show featured Krist Novoselic on bass
"Satan's In The Manger"	The Frogs	Dennis Flemion and Jimmy Flemion	
"School's Out"	Alice Cooper	Alice Cooper, Michael Bruce, Glen Buxton, Dennis Dunaway and Neal Smith	02/07/11 show featured Cooper on vocals
"Sheer Heart Attack"	Queen	Roger Taylor	13/12/97 show featured Roger Taylor
"Tony's Theme"	Pixies	Black Francis	Used to introduce "Good Grief" in live shows
"Under Pressure"	Queen and David Bowie	David Bowie, Freddie Mercury, Brian May, Roger Taylor and John Deacon	
"United States of Whatever"	Liam Lynch	Liam Lynch	
"We Are the Champions"	Queen	Freddie Mercury	Played with Queen + Paul Rodgers
"We Will Rock You"	Queen	Brian May	Played with Queen + Paul Rodgers
"Young Man Blues"	The Who	Mose Allison	
"War Pigs"	Black Sabbath	Ozzy Osbourne, Tony Iommi, Geezer Butler, Bill Ward	Played with Zac Brown on Late Show with David Letterman
