= Foo Files =

Series of EPs by Foo Fighters

- The cover of the first release in the collection, 00950025

Compilation album series by Foo Fighters
- Released: 2019–2020
- Recorded: 1994–2011
- Genre: Alternative rock
- Length: 4:45:30

Foo Fighters chronology
Concrete and Gold (2017)	Foo Files (2019)	Medicine at Midnight (2021)

Foo Files is a series of EPs released by Foo Fighters starting in 2019. Available through streaming media services, the EPs consist of B-sides recorded by the band from their earliest days, along with selected live performances. All the titles list the years of the song's releases plus "25" to celebrate the 25th anniversary of the Foo Fighters in 2020.

Foo Files does not include any recordings that were included on the band's 2011 covers album, Medium Rare.

== Track listings ==
=== 00950025 ===
No.	Title	Original appearance	Length
1.	"Wattershed" (Live at Reading Festival, 1995)	"For All the Cows" Australian and UK CD single, and "I'll Stick Around" Japanese CD single	2:16
2.	"For All the Cows" (Live at Reading Festival, 1995)	"For All the Cows" Australian and UK CD single, blue 7" single, and "I'll Stick Around" Japanese CD single	3:34
3.	"Next Year" (Live at The Chapel, Melbourne, 2000)	"Breakout" Australian CD single	4:14

=== 00111125 - Live in London ===
The tracks were taken from the band's performance at the Roundhouse for the 2011 iTunes Festival.

No.	Title	Length
1.	"The Pretender"	5:35
2.	"White Limo"	3:14
3.	"Arlandria"	5:43
4.	"Walk"	4:28
5.	"These Days"	5:51
6.	"Everlong"	5:23

=== 00070725 Live at Studio 606 ===
The tracks were taken from a 2007 performance at the band's own Studio 606, in Northridge, California, for the online show Walmart Soundcheck.

No.	Title	Length
1.	"Cheer Up, Boys (Your Make Up Is Running)"	3:32
2.	"Big Me"	3:00
3.	"The Pretender"	4:29
4.	"My Hero"	4:39
5.	"Home"	4:55

=== 00050525 Live In Roswell ===
Released in the same day the Storm Area 51 event would happen, it is a 2005 performance at the Walker Air Force Base in Roswell, New Mexico.

No.	Title	Length
1.	"In Your Honor"	4:22
2.	"The Last Song"	3:16
3.	"Free Me"	4:33
4.	"Stacked Actors"	10:01
5.	"Monkey Wrench"	5:28
6.	"All My Life"	5:16
7.	"This Is a Call"	4:29

=== 01070725 ===
This EP contains B-sides for the singles from the 2007 album Echoes, Silence, Patience & Grace.

No.	Title	Original appearance	Length
1.	"If Ever"	"The Pretender" UK CD1 single	4:13
2.	"Come Alive" (Demo Version)	"The Pretender" UK CD2 single	5:29
3.	"Seda"	"Long Road to Ruin" UK CD1 single	3:44
4.	"Keep the Car Running" (Arcade Fire cover, live from Brighton 18 August 2007)	"Long Road to Ruin" UK CD2 single	3:25
5.	"Holiday in Cambodia" (Dead Kennedys cover, live from MTV Video Music Awards 2007, featuring Serj Tankian)	"Long Road to Ruin" 7" single	4:00

=== 00020225 ===
This EP contains B-sides for the singles from the 2002 album One by One.

No.	Title	Original appearance	Length
1.	"The One"	Orange County: The Soundtrack	2:44
2.	"Sister Europe" (The Psychedelic Furs cover)	"All My Life" UK CD1 single	5:08
3.	"Win Or Lose"	Out Cold soundtrack and "All My Life" UK CD1 single	3:27
4.	"Planet Claire" (The B-52's cover, Live at New York City, Oct 2002 with Fred Schneider))	"Times Like These" UK CD1 single	4:18
5.	"Normal"	"Times Like These" UK CD2 single	4:30
6.	"Learn To Fly" (Live at the Wiltern Theatre, Los Angeles, CA - October 2002)	"Times Like These" UK CD2 single	3:43
7.	"Times Like These" (Acoustic Version)	"Low" US/Canadian DVD single	3:58
8.	"Disenchanted Lullaby" (Live Acoustic)	"Have It All" UK and Australian CD single	4:08

=== 01050525 ===
This EP contains B-sides for the singles from the 2005 album In Your Honor and contains most songs from Five Songs and a Cover. Also released as 02050525 with only the first six tracks.

No.	Title	Original appearance	Length
1.	"I'm in Love with a German Film Star" (The Passion cover)	"Best of You" UK CD1 single	4:21
2.	"FFL (Fat Fucking Lie)"	"Best of You" UK CD2 single	2:29
3.	"Kiss the Bottle" (Jawbreaker cover)	"Best of You" UK CD2 single	4:04
4.	"Spill"	"Best of You" 7" single	3:30
5.	"Skin and Bones"	"DOA" UK CD2 single	3:35
6.	"DOA (Demo)"	"Resolve" UK CD1 single	4:10
7.	"World (Demo)"	"Resolve" UK CD2 single and 7" single	5:39
8.	"Born on the Bayou" (Creedence Clearwater Revival cover)	"Resolve" UK CD2 single	3:22
9.	"Razor (Live acoustic)"	"DOA" yellow 7" single	4:48
10.	"The Sign"	In Your Honor UK/Japan/vinyl/iTunes bonus track	4:02
11.	"Best of You" (Live at the Quart Festival, Kristiansand, Norway, July 2005)	Five Songs and a Cover EP	4:39

=== 00999925 ===
This EP contains B-sides for the singles from the 1999 album There Is Nothing Left to Lose, and is also available as 01999925, with only the first five tracks.

No.	Title	Original appearance	Length
1.	"Iron and Stone" (The Obsessed cover)	"Learn to Fly" UK CD1 single	2:52
2.	"Have a Cigar" (Pink Floyd cover)	"Learn to Fly" UK CD1 single	3:58
3.	"Make a Bet" (original version of "Win or Lose")	"Learn to Fly" UK CD2 single	3:27
4.	"Ain't It The Life" (Live at Wisseloord Studios - November 1999)	"Stacked Actors" Australian CD single	4:43
5.	"Floaty" (Live at Wisseloord Studios - November 1999)	"Stacked Actors" Australian CD single	4:42
6.	"Fraternity"	"There Is Nothing Left To Lose" Australian/Japanese CD Releases	3:10
7.	"Breakout" (Live 23 November 1999 Glasgow Barrowlands)	"Generator" Australian and European CD single	3:40
8.	"Learn to Fly" ("Live at Sydney Showground, Jan. 2000)	"Breakout" UK CD1 single and "Generator" Australian CD single	5:29
9.	"Stacked Actors" ("Live at Sydney Showground, Jan. 2000)	"Breakout" UK CD2 single and "Generator" Australian CD single	5:29
10.	"Monkey Wrench" (Live at The Chapel, Melbourne, Feb. 2000)	"Breakout" UK CD2 single and Australian CD single	4:03

=== 00979725 ===
This EP contains B-sides for the singles from the 1997 album The Colour and the Shape.

No.	Title	Original appearance	Length
1.	"Up In Arms" (Slow Version)	"Monkey Wrench" Australian, European, Japanese and UK CD1 single	3:11
2.	"See You" (Acoustic Version)	"Monkey Wrench" UK CD2 single	2:27
3.	"Requiem" (Killing Joke cover)	"Everlong" UK CD2 single	3:33
4.	"I'll Stick Around" (Live at the Apollo, Manchester, UK, May, 1997)	"Everlong" UK CD2 single	4:08
5.	"Dear Lover"	"My Hero" Australian, Japanese and UK CD single	4:33
6.	"Walking After You" (Single Mix)	The X-Files: The Album	4:08

=== 00959525 ===
This EP contains B-sides for the singles from the 1995 album Foo Fighters.

No.	Title	Original appearance	Length
1.	"Winnebago"	"This Is a Call" French, Japanese, UK CD single, and 7" and 12" single	4:13
2.	"Podunk"	"This Is a Call" Australian, Dutch and UK CD single, and cassette tape single	3:03
3.	"How I Miss You"	"I'll Stick Around" Japanese and UK CD single, and red 7" single	4:55
4.	"Ozone" (Ace Frehley cover)	"I'll Stick Around" Japanese and UK CD single	4:17
5.	"Floaty" (Live at BBC Evening Session, London, UK - November 1995)	"Big Me" CD single and white 7" single	5:22
6.	"Alone + Easy Target" (Live at BBC Evening Session, London, UK - November 1995)	"Big Me" CD single	4:22
