= Five Songs and a Cover =

2005 EP by Foo Fighters

EP by Foo Fighters
- Released: November 20, 2005
- Genre: Alternative rock
- Length: 23:35
- Label: Roswell, RCA
- Producer: Foo Fighters, Nick Raskulinecz

Foo Fighters chronology
In Your Honor (2005)	Five Songs and a Cover (2005)	Skin and Bones (2006)

Five Songs and a Cover (A.K.A. 4 Stars) is an EP released by Foo Fighters on November 20, 2005. It was exclusively distributed to Best Buy retail stores.

The EP is a collection of B-sides from singles from the band's 2005 album In Your Honor. The title refers to the contents: five original songs and one cover song. The cover song is Cream's "I Feel Free", which features drummer Taylor Hawkins on vocals and Dave Grohl on drums. One song on the album, "Skin and Bones", was released as a B-side to "DOA", and became a popular feature of Foo Fighters acoustic shows. All songs (with the exception of "I Feel Free") have since been re-released on streaming platforms as part of the EP 01050525.

== Track listing ==
All songs by Dave Grohl, Taylor Hawkins, Nate Mendel and Chris Shiflett, except where noted.

No.	Title	Writer(s)	Length
1.	"Best of You" (live at The Quart Festival, Kristiansand, Norway, July 7, 2005)		4:41
2.	"DOA (demo)" (appears on the "Resolve" single)		4:11
3.	"Skin and Bones" (appears on the "DOA" single)	Grohl	3:37
4.	"World (demo)" (appears on the "Resolve" single)		5:40
5.	"I Feel Free" (appears on the "DOA" single, originally performed by Cream)	Jack Bruce, Pete Brown	2:56
6.	"FFL (Fat Fucking Lie)" (appears on the "Best of You" single)		2:29

== Personnel ==
Foo Fighters

- Dave Grohl – vocals, guitar, drums on "I Feel Free"
- Taylor Hawkins – drums, vocals on "I Feel Free"
- Nate Mendel – bass guitar
- Chris Shiflett – guitar

Additional personnel

- Foo Fighters – production
- Nick Raskulinecz – production on "DOA", "World", and "FFL", mixing (all except "I Feel Free"), recording on "World" and "FFL"
- Mike Terry – recording on "DOA", "Skin and Bones", and "I Feel Free", mixing on "I Feel Free"
- Mats Borch Bugge – recording on "Best of You"
- Bob Ludwig – mastering
- Adam Ryan – mastering
- Jeff Nicholas – interior photos
