= Miracle (Foo Fighters song) =

Promotional single by Foo Fighters

from the album In Your Honor
- Released: September 18, 2006
- Recorded: January–March 2005
- Genre: Acoustic rock
- Length: 3:29
- Label: RCA
- Songwriters: Dave Grohl; Taylor Hawkins; Nate Mendel; Chris Shiflett
- Producers: Nick Raskulinecz; Foo Fighters

Foo Fighters singles chronology
| "No Way Back" / "Cold Day in the Sun" (2006) | "Miracle" (2006) | "The Pretender" (2007) |

"Miracle" is the fifth single released from the fifth Foo Fighters album, In Your Honor. It was released as a promotional single only and no retail single was released. This song features John Paul Jones from Led Zeppelin on piano and Petra Haden on violin.

== Track listing ==
All songs written by Dave Grohl, Taylor Hawkins, Nate Mendel and Chris Shiflett.

1. "Miracle" – 3:29
2. "Suggested Callout Hook" – 0:10

== Personnel ==
Sources: (Note: The band members' instruments are not credited in the album's liner notes. Their primary instruments are listed based on their de facto primary roles in the group.)

Foo Fighters

- Dave Grohl – vocals, rhythm guitar, tambourine
- Taylor Hawkins – floor tom and snare
- Nate Mendel – bass guitar
- Chris Shiflett – lead guitar

Additional musicians

- Petra Haden – violin
- John Paul Jones – piano

Production

- Nick Raskulinecz – production
- Foo Fighters – production
- Mike Terry – engineering
- Elliot Scheiner – mixing
- Bob Ludwig – mastering

== Appearances in media ==
In The West Wing episode "Election Day Part II," the band is seen playing this song at a campaign party for Democratic presidential candidate Matt Santos. "Miracle" has also appeared in episodes of Scrubs and Cold Case.

== Charts ==
| Chart (2006) | Peak position |
|---|---|
| Canada Rock (Billboard) | 29 |
| US Adult Pop Airplay (Billboard) | 39 |
