= Marigold (Dave Grohl song) =

1992 song written by Dave Grohl

"Color Pictures of a Marigold"

Song by Late!

from the album Pocketwatch
- Released: 1992
- Recorded: February 16, 1991 at Upland Studios in Arlington, Virginia
- Length: 3:13
- Label: Simple Machines
- Songwriter: Dave Grohl
- Producers: Barrett Jones, Geoff Turner

"Marigold"
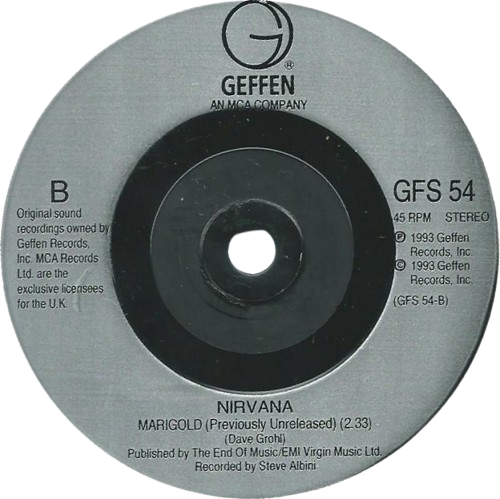
- UK B-side label

Song by Nirvana
- A-side: "Heart-Shaped Box"
- Released: August 1993 (B-side)
- Recorded: February 1993
- Studio: Pachyderm (Cannon Falls, Minnesota)
- Length: 2:33
- Label: DGC
- Songwriter: Dave Grohl
- Producer: Steve Albini

"Marigold"

Song by Foo Fighters

from the album Skin and Bones
- Released: November 2006
- Recorded: August 2006 at Pantages Theatre in Hollywood, California
- Length: 3:20
- Label: RCA/Roswell
- Songwriter: Dave Grohl
- Producer: Gil Norton

"Marigold" (originally titled "Color Pictures of a Marigold") is a song written and composed by American rock musician Dave Grohl, that was first released on Pocketwatch, an album Grohl issued under the pseudonym Late! in 1992.

A version was recorded and released in 1993 by Nirvana as a B-side to the "Heart-Shaped Box" single. A live version was later featured on the Foo Fighters' release Skin and Bones in 2006, garnering "Marigold" the distinction of being the only song released by both Nirvana and Foo Fighters, Grohl's two most distinguished bands.

== History ==
=== Pocketwatch ===
"Marigold" was originally recorded by Dave Grohl during a session at Upland Studios in Arlington, Virginia with producer Barrett Jones on February 16, 1991, taking place a number of months after Grohl joined Nirvana. The session was executed in a similar way to how the Foo Fighters' debut album would later be conceived, with all vocal and instrumental parts done solely by Grohl. With Late! as the moniker, the session was combined with four songs recorded in the summer of 1991 to create the album Pocketwatch, released on Simple Machines in 1992 as part of the label's Tool Cassette Series.^{[1]} The song is listed in the liner notes under its original title, "Color Pictures of a Marigold", and is one of just two songs on the album to feature only vocals and guitar.

=== Nirvana ===
In February 1993, Grohl entered Pachyderm Studios in Cannon Falls, Minnesota with bandmates Kurt Cobain and Krist Novoselic, to record what would eventually become In Utero, the third and final studio album from Nirvana, produced by Steve Albini. Towards the end of the session, Grohl decided to re-record "Marigold", this time with a more detailed arrangement including bass and drums. Like the Late! version, lead and backing vocals and guitar were done by Grohl, who also recorded the drum parts.^{[2]} Although Novoselic contributed bass,^{[2]} Cobain did not play on the released version. There were, however, versions of the song that Cobain did play on – these remain unreleased.^{[2]} The song did not make the final album, but would see limited release in August 1993 as a B-side, along with "Milk It", to "Heart-Shaped Box", the first single from In Utero (Grohl is credited for playing drums and singing lead vocal on "Marigold", but not guitar or backing vocal). The song would later appear on the third disc of the posthumous rarities box set With the Lights Out in 2004 and on 20th anniversary editions of the In Utero album in 2013. The song received some airplay on US alternative and active rock radio in 1996, after it appeared on the import release of Nirvana's European Singles box set as the B-side to the "Heart-Shaped Box" single. KROQ Music Director Lisa Worden, introduced “Marigold” to the radio waves after discovering the B-side on the single in the import box set. The song was then picked up by alternative radio stations in New York, Chicago, and Atlanta. Despite the spontaneous success of the song, Geffen Records and Grohl refused to capitalize on it and made it known that copies of the song would not be sent out to radio stations to promote airplay.

=== Charts ===
Chart (2021)	Peak position
LyricFind U.S. (Billboard)	8

=== Foo Fighters ===
"Marigold" was performed live for the first time by Grohl during the Foo Fighters set at the Berkeley Community Theatre on July 14, 2006, and would be played throughout the rest of the tour.^{[3]} A performance the following month at Pantages Theatre in Hollywood, California, featuring the song with an eight-piece band, was released on the live album Skin and Bones on November 7, 2006. This version, recorded over twelve years after the previous Nirvana version, garnered further recognition of the song. "Marigold" would be the third song taken from Pocketwatch to be re-recorded and released by the Foo Fighters, along with "Winnebago" and "Friend of a Friend".

== Releases and personnel ==
The following is a list of the only official releases to feature the song "Marigold" and the personnel that contributed to them.

Artist	Recording studio	Date recorded	Release	Personnel
Late!	Upland Studios	December, 1990 - July, 1991	Pocketwatch: Released: 1992; Label: Simple Machines; Format: cassette (CS)	Dave Grohl – vocals, guitar
Nirvana	Upland Studios	December, 1990 - July, 1991	In Utero (deluxe) (Disc 2): Released: September 24, 2013; Labels: DGC, Geffen, Universal; Format: 12-inch, CD	Dave Grohl – vocals, guitar
Nirvana	Pachyderm Studios	February 12–26, 1993	"Heart-Shaped Box" single: Released: August 23, 1993; Labels: DGC, Geffen; Formats: 7-inch, 12-inch, CD, CS	Dave Grohl – vocals, guitar, drums^{[2]}; Krist Novoselic – bass^{[2]}; Kera Schaley - cello ^{[2]}
Nirvana	Pachyderm Studios	February 12–26, 1993	With the Lights Out: Released: November 23, 2004; Labels: DGC, Geffen, Universal; Format: 3xCD+DVD box set	Dave Grohl – vocals, guitar, drums^{[2]}; Krist Novoselic – bass^{[2]}; Kera Schaley - cello ^{[2]}
Nirvana	Pachyderm Studios	February 12–26, 1993	In Utero (deluxe) (Disc 1): Released: September 24, 2013; Labels: DGC, Geffen, Universal; Format: 12-inch, CD	Dave Grohl – vocals, guitar, drums^{[2]}; Krist Novoselic – bass^{[2]}; Kera Schaley - cello ^{[2]}
Foo Fighters	Pantages Theatre (Hollywood)	August 29–31, 2006	Skin and Bones: Released: November 7, 2006; Labels: RCA, Roswell; Formats: CD, DVD	Dave Grohl – vocals, guitar; Chris Shiflett – guitar; Nate Mendel – bass; Taylor Hawkins – drums; Pat Smear – guitar; Petra Haden – violin, backing vocals; Drew Hester – vibraphone; Rami Jaffee – piano, Mellotron
