= No Way Back/Cold Day in the Sun =

"No Way Back" / "Cold Day in the Sun"
- European retail single

Single by Foo Fighters

from the album In Your Honor
- Released: March 13, 2006
- Recorded: January–March 2005
- Genre: Post-grunge, hard rock ("No Way Back"); Alternative rock, acoustic rock ("Cold Day in the Sun")
- Length: 3:17 ("No Way Back"); 3:23 ("Cold Day in the Sun")
- Label: RCA
- Songwriters: Dave Grohl; Taylor Hawkins; Nate Mendel; Chris Shiflett; ("No Way Back"); Taylor Hawkins ("Cold Day in the Sun")
- Producers: Nick Raskulinecz; Foo Fighters

Foo Fighters singles chronology
"Resolve" (2005)	"No Way Back" / "Cold Day in the Sun" (2006)	"Miracle" (2006)

Music video
- "No Way Back" on YouTube

"No Way Back" / "Cold Day in the Sun" is the fourth single released from American rock band Foo Fighters' fifth album, In Your Honor (2005). It is a double A-side single, including "No Way Back" and "Cold Day in the Sun", which is from the second disc of the album.

== Song information ==
"Cold Day in the Sun" is the first original song that features drummer Taylor Hawkins on lead vocals, while lead singer Dave Grohl plays drums. Hawkins wrote the music for the song in 2001. During pre-production of In Your Honor, Hawkins played the song on an acoustic guitar and suggested that Grohl record it. While an electric version was considered, it was eventually recorded for the acoustic album. Hawkins wrote the lyrics the morning before the song was recorded and considered them sub-par: "To be honest, the lyrics suck, it's more about the melody. And Dave always said he liked it, and I was like, 'Yeah, bull.'"

Billboard cited "Cold Day in the Sun" as one of the standout tracks on CD2 of In Your Honor.

== Music video ==
The video for "No Way Back" shows clips of the band on tour, mainly in Europe but also some American cities such as Nashville River Stage concert series in 2004, including Dave Grohl spitting beer on the crowd and playing ice hockey.

== Use in other media ==
"No Way Back" is featured in the video games Madden NFL 06 and Guitar Hero: Warriors of Rock. In addition, the song along with fellow In Your Honor tracks "Resolve" and "Miracle" appeared on the TV show The West Wing.

== Other versions ==
"Cold Day in the Sun" was featured on the Skin and Bones DVD (US version, recorded late August 2006 at the Pantages Theater in Los Angeles) and the Foo Fighters Live at Wembley Stadium DVD (filmed on June 7, 2008) as well as the special concert for Live on Letterman (filmed April 12, 2011). Taylor Hawkins is featured singing and drumming, while Dave Grohl is featured on acoustic guitar and backup vocals. "No Way Back" was also featured on the Foo Fighters Live at Wembley Stadium DVD.

== Track listing ==
All tracks written by Dave Grohl, Taylor Hawkins, Nate Mendel & Chris Shiflett, except where noted.

1. A. "No Way Back" – 3:17
2. A. "Cold Day in the Sun" (Hawkins) – 3:23
3. B. "Best of You" (Live at the Supertop, Auckland, New Zealand; 26 November 2005) – 6:23

== Personnel ==
Personnel taken from In Your Honor liner notes. (Note: The band members' instruments are not credited in the album's liner notes, except for Hawkins' vocals and Grohl's drums on "Cold Day in the Sun". Their primary instruments are listed based on their de facto primary roles in the group.)

=== "No Way Back" ===
Foo Fighters

- Dave Grohl – vocals, rhythm guitar
- Chris Shiflett – lead guitar
- Nate Mendel – bass guitar
- Taylor Hawkins – drums

Technical personnel

- Nick Raskulinecz – production, mixing
- Foo Fighters – production
- Mike Terry – engineering
- Bob Ludwig – mastering

=== "Cold Day in the Sun" ===
Foo Fighters

- Taylor Hawkins – vocals, tambourine
- Chris Shiflett – guitars
- Dave Grohl – drums

Additional musicians

- Rami Jaffee – keyboards
- Nick Raskulinecz – bass guitar

Technical personnel

- Nick Raskulinecz – production
- Foo Fighters – production
- Mike Terry – engineering
- Elliot Scheiner – mixing
- Bob Ludwig – mastering

== Charts ==
=== Weekly charts ===
Weekly chart performance for "No Way Back/Cold Day in the Sun"
Chart (2006)	Peak position
Canada (Nielsen BDS)	37
Canada Rock Top 30 (Radio & Records)	3
Quebec Airplay (ADISQ)	46
Scottish Singles Sales (Official Charts) Double A-side with "Cold Day in the Sun"	37
UK Singles (Official Charts) Double A-side with "Cold Day in the Sun"	64
UK Rock & Metal (Official Charts) Double A-side with "Cold Day in the Sun"	1
US Alternative Airplay (Billboard)	2
US Mainstream Rock (Billboard)	6

=== Year-end charts ===
Year-end chart performance for "No Way Back/Cold Day in the Sun"
Chart (2006)	Position
Canada Rock (Radio & Records)	3
US Alternative Songs (Billboard)	23
US Mainstream Rock Songs (Billboard)	32
