= Medium Rare (Foo Fighters album) =

Compilation album by Foo Fighters
- Released: April 16, 2011
- Genre: Rock, hard rock
- Length: 45:33
- Label: Roswell/RCA

Foo Fighters chronology
Wasting Light (2011)	Medium Rare (2011)	Sonic Highways (2014)

Medium Rare is a covers album by Foo Fighters. The album was released on April 16, 2011, as a limited-edition vinyl for Record Store Day, an event that celebrates independent record stores. Apart from the new recordings of "Bad Reputation" and "This Will Be Our Year" and the live version of "Young Man Blues", all tracks have been previously released as B-sides or in other compilation albums.

A CD edition of the album was also given free to new subscribers of Q magazine for a limited time, with the song "Darling Nikki" omitted.

== Track listing ==
No.	Title	Writer(s)	Original appearance	Length
1.	"Band on the Run" (Paul McCartney & Wings cover)	Paul McCartney, Linda McCartney	Radio 1 Established 1967, 2007 (Recorded in 2004)	5:08
2.	"I Feel Free" (Cream cover)	Jack Bruce, Pete Brown	"DOA" single, 2005	2:56
3.	"A Life of Illusion" (Joe Walsh cover)	Joe Walsh, Kenny Passarelli	"Times Like These" single, 2003	3:40
4.	"Young Man Blues" (Mose Allison / The Who cover; Live at Austin City Limits, Austin, Texas, September 28, 2008)	Mose Allison	VH1 Rock Honors 2008*	5:28
5.	"Bad Reputation" (Thin Lizzy cover)	Brian Downey, Scott Gorham, Phil Lynott	Not previously recorded, 2011	2:33
6.	"Darling Nikki" (Prince and The Revolution cover)	Prince	"Have It All" single, 2003	3:24
7.	"Down in the Park" (Tubeway Army cover)	Gary Numan	Songs in the Key of X & "Monkey Wrench" single CD2, 1997	4:07
8.	"Baker Street" (Gerry Rafferty cover; Live at the BBC Radio 1 evening session, April 30, 1997)	Gerry Rafferty	"My Hero" single, 1998	5:39
9.	"Danny Says" (The Ramones cover; featuring Gregg Bissonette on drums)	Joey Ramone	"All My Life" single, 2002	2:59
10.	"Have a Cigar" (Pink Floyd cover; featuring Brian May)	Roger Waters	Mission: Impossible II soundtrack, 2000	4:15
11.	"Never Talking to You Again" (Hüsker Dü cover; Live at Color Line Arena, Hamburg, Germany, December 1, 2002)	Grant Hart	"Low" single, 2003	1:45
12.	"Gas Chamber" (Angry Samoans cover; Live at the BBC Radio 1 evening session, November 23, 1995)	"Metal Mike" Saunders, Gregg Turner	"Big Me" single & Rock Against Bush, Vol. 2, 1996/2004	0:57
13.	"This Will Be Our Year" (The Zombies cover)	Chris White	Not previously recorded	2:44
Total length:				45:33

Note: "Darling Nikki" does not appear on the Q magazine CD and Humo release.

- – Although the official description says only two songs are previously unreleased, "Young Man Blues" was previously recorded but does not appear on any releases.

== Charts ==
Chart (2011)	Peak position
Dutch Albums (Album Top 100)	51
US Top Hard Rock Albums (Billboard)	24
US Indie Store Album Sales (Billboard)	17

== Personnel ==
Foo Fighters

- Dave Grohl – lead vocals, backing vocals, rhythm guitar (except tracks 7–8 and 12), lead guitar (tracks 7–8 and 12)
- Pat Smear – rhythm guitar (tracks 5, 7–8 & 12), lead guitar (track 5)
- Nate Mendel – bass guitar
- Taylor Hawkins – drums (except tracks 7, 9 and 12), backing vocals on tracks, lead vocals (tracks 2–3 & 10)
- Chris Shiflett – lead guitar (except tracks 7–8 and 12), lead vocals on track 9
- Rami Jaffee – keyboards on track 13
- William Goldsmith – drums (tracks 7 and 12)

Additional personnel

- Gregg Bissonette – drums on track 9
- Brian May – lead guitar on track 10
