= Pocketwatch (album) =

Demo album by Late!
- Released: June 30, 1992
- Recorded: December 23, 1990; July 27, 1991
- Studios: Upland and WGNS (Arlington, Virginia)
- Genres: Alternative rock, grunge, lo-fi
- Length: 34:45
- Label: Simple Machines
- Producer: Geoff Turner

Pocketwatch is a cassette album by Dave Grohl, under the pseudonym Late!, released in 1992, on the now-defunct indie label Simple Machines as part of their Tool Cassette Series.

== Background ==
In the summer of 1991, Dave Grohl went into WGNS Studios and recorded four songs, playing all the instruments himself. The recording was combined with six songs from a previous Upland Studios session recorded in late 1990. Both sessions occurred after Grohl had joined Nirvana. A tape of the songs, given to Simple Machines co-founder Jenny Toomey by Grohl, immediately became a candidate for the label's Tool Cassette Series. The 1990 sessions emerged as Grohl, then the drummer of Scream, requested his producer friend Barrett Jones to record songs on his home 8-track tape recorder. Upon accepting Simple Machines' request for a demo tape, Grohl decided to hide his identity under the pseudonym Late!, "because I'm an idiot and I thought it would be funny to say to everybody, 'Sorry, we're Late!'".

The Tool Cassette Series started around 1991 as an experiment and as a way of keeping music "in print" on an as-needed basis without having to finance vinyl or CD pressings, since Simple Machines dubbed the cassettes as the orders came in. With multiple cassette decks and a lot of volunteer help, this was a manageable project for the label. Shortly after Nirvana released Nevermind in the fall of 1991, its unexpected success was large enough that Pocketwatch eventually became noticed. It gained more attention when the Foo Fighters' early material was released in 1995. Some of the songs appeared on subsequent releases, creating even higher demand for the cassette. Suddenly, Pocketwatch was being mentioned frequently in interviews, and the label became flooded with orders. Grohl claimed that the big number of requests led Toomey to "literally dub them on a double cassette deck in her bedroom."

With minimal help and deteriorating master cassettes, Simple Machines got in touch with Grohl about releasing the Late! album as a CD, to keep up with demand. However, Grohl preferred to keep it as a cassette-only release, which the label honored. The musician explained later that he refused to do a CD release because "it was never intended to be a big thing", but Grohl also joked, regarding Pocketwatch's current status as a highly sought collectible, that he "wanted to drive up the price of cassettes to $3,000". When the two master cassettes for Pocketwatch came to the end of their useful lives, and with some of the other artists' masters in the same condition, Simple Machines decided to discontinue the Tool Cassette Series from their mailorder, putting the over-half-decade experiment to an end.

== Other releases ==
As cassettes became a less popular format, and with no official CD release in sight, Pocketwatch fell victim to countless bootleg CD releases, ranging from a single song to the entire album. "Color Pictures of a Marigold" appeared on the rarities collection Outcesticide III: The Final Solution, part of a popular Nirvana bootleg series on Blue Moon Records. The song also appeared on Fighting the "N" Factor, an unauthorized Foo Fighters release that included the track as a bonus, with Nirvana's Saturday Night Live rehearsals and Tunnel TV Show performance. The Late! album appeared in its entirety on the Foo Fighters' bootleg album Pocketwatch Demos on Primadonna, a bootleg label active throughout the 1990s, based in Milan, Italy.

Songs from the Late! album made appearances on official releases as well. Prior to the Pocketwatch offering, "Petrol CB" was included on the Neapolitan Metropolitan 7" vinyl box set compilation released by Simple Machines in 1992, under the title "There's That Song" and also featured tracks from Breadwinner, Burma Jam, Bratmobile, and Lilys, among others. The only song officially released on CD was a remixed version of "Just Another Story About Skeeter Thompson", included on The Melvins' 1992 King Buzzo EP, retitled "Skeeter".

Although constantly coupled with Nirvana and Foo Fighters collections, Late! should be considered its own separate project, even though both bands would go on to release new versions of songs from the Pocketwatch album. "Color Pictures of a Marigold" was re-recorded with Krist Novoselic on bass in 1993 and released as a B-side of Nirvana's "Heart-Shaped Box" single, simply titled "Marigold". This version would also appear on the 2004 With the Lights Out box set. Another version of the song appeared on the Foo Fighters live album Skin and Bones. "Winnebago" was re-recorded during the sessions for the first Foo Fighters album in 1994. Despite not making the album, it appeared as a B-side on the Foo Fighters first release, the "Exhausted" vinyl single, and later on the Australian bonus disc to Foo Fighters and as a B-side to the singles "This Is a Call" and "Big Me". A new version of "Friend of a Friend" was first released on a free NME covermount cassette, then the acoustic side of the Foo Fighters' 2005 double album In Your Honor and later the following year on Skin and Bones.

== Track listing ==
All tracks are written by Dave Grohl.

Side one
No.	Title	Length
1.	"Pokey the Little Puppy"	4:21
2.	"Petrol CB"	4:44
3.	"Friend of a Friend"	3:06
4.	"Throwing Needles"	3:20
5.	"Just Another Story About Skeeter Thompson"	2:05
Total length:		17:36

Side two
No.	Title	Length
1.	"Color Pictures of a Marigold"	3:13
2.	"Hell's Garden"	3:18
3.	"Winnebago"	4:11
4.	"Bruce"	3:52
5.	"Milk"	2:35
Total length:		17:09 (34:45)

== Personnel ==
Personnel adapted from Pocketwatch liner notes.

- Dave Grohl – all instruments and music
- Barrett Jones – backing vocals on "Petrol CB", recording (tracks 1–6)
- Geoff Turner – engineering and production (tracks 7–10)
