= Resolve (song) =

- Standard artwork

Single by Foo Fighters

from the album In Your Honor
- Released: November 21, 2005
- Recorded: January–March 2005
- Genre: Alternative rock
- Length: 4:49
- Label: Roswell, RCA
- Songwriters: Dave Grohl; Taylor Hawkins; Nate Mendel; Chris Shiflett
- Producers: Nick Raskulinecz; Foo Fighters

Foo Fighters singles chronology
"DOA" (2005)	"Resolve" (2005)	"No Way Back/Cold Day in the Sun" (2006)

Music video
- "Resolve" on YouTube

"Resolve" is the third single from Foo Fighters album In Your Honor. It was released on 21 November 2005. It has been released on two different discs. In The West Wing episode "Election Day Part II", the band is seen playing this song at a campaign party for Democratic Presidential candidate Matt Santos.

== Music video ==
The video shot in Duarte, California, was directed by Michael Palmieri, (director of preceding single's video; "DOA") was shot with the band members being chroma keyed to be depicting playing on a setting of sand waves with a lighthouse in the background. Beginning with Dave Grohl contemplating visiting the "Sushi for Less" restaurant establishment from the other side of Route 66 (Huntington Dr.) then crossing the street, with wind chimes ringing in the background when he opens the door. Upon Grohl entering the restaurant seeing only the other band members as patrons, he is greeted and seated by an Asian waitress (played by Kristina Lum, a U.S. Olympic team synchronized swimmer). After being seated, Grohl is waited on by a male Asian double of himself, including his tattoos and T-shirt, minus the Motörhead logo. Nate Mendel starts to get bored looking at the live crustacean in his cup and starts balancing a fork and a spoon on the rim of a glass. Taylor Hawkins tries to better this by balancing a salt shaker in a small pile of salt. At one point, Grohl unexplainedly mocks the song refrain. In an extended daydream of sequence, Grohl envisions himself as the scuba suited toy in the restaurant's aquarium as a mermaid, who resembles the restaurant's waitress, swims towards him. (The bottle at his feet with the red liquid is a reference to the video for "DOA") After a moment of bubbling love hearts at each other, she detaches his air hose and the glass in his helmet cracks. At the same time, Mendel knocks the glass off the table and Hawkins knocks over the salt shaker. Before the glass hits the ground, Chris Shiflett catches it and puts it back on the table. Still daydreaming, Grohl finds he is able to breathe under water and he swims away with the mermaid. As Shiflett asks Mendel to show him how to balance the fork and spoon on the glass, Grohl is snapped back to reality by the waitress handing him the bill. The video premiered on British television long before it premiered in the United States.

== Track listings ==
CD1
No.	Title	Length
1.	"Resolve"	4:38
2.	"DOA" (demo)	4:09

CD2
No.	Title	Length
1.	"Resolve"	4:38
2.	"World" (demo)	5:39
3.	"Born on the Bayou" (Creedence Clearwater Revival cover)	3:20
4.	"Resolve take two" (video)	4:38

7" vinyl
No.	Title	Length
1.	"Resolve"	4:38
2.	"World" (demo)	5:39

== Personnel ==
Personnel taken from In Your Honor liner notes. (Note: The band members' instruments are not credited in the album's liner notes. Their primary instruments are listed based on their de facto primary roles in the group.)

Foo Fighters

- Dave Grohl – vocals, rhythm guitar
- Chris Shiflett – lead guitar
- Nate Mendel – bass guitar
- Taylor Hawkins – drums

Production

- Nick Raskulinecz – production, mixing
- Foo Fighters – production
- Mike Terry – engineering
- Bob Ludwig – mastering

== Chart positions ==
Chart (2006)	Peak position
Canada Rock Top 30 (Radio & Records)	2
Netherlands (Mega Top 50)	38
Netherlands (Single Top 100)	82
New Zealand (Recorded Music NZ)	39
UK Singles (Official Charts)	32
UK Rock & Metal (Official Charts)	3
