= DOA (Foo Fighters song) =

- Standard international artwork

Single by Foo Fighters

from the album In Your Honor
- Released: September 5, 2005
- Recorded: January–March 2005
- Genre: Alternative rock, hard rock
- Length: 4:13
- Label: Roswell, RCA
- Songwriters: Dave Grohl; Taylor Hawkins; Nate Mendel; Chris Shiflett
- Producers: Nick Raskulinecz; Foo Fighters

Foo Fighters singles chronology
"Best of You" (2005)	"DOA" (2005)	"Resolve" (2005)

Music video
- "DOA" on YouTube

"DOA" is the second song released as a single from Foo Fighters' fifth album, In Your Honor.

== Song information ==
DOA refers to the medical term "dead on arrival". The song reached number one on Billboard's Hot Modern Rock Tracks chart for six non-consecutive weeks. The cover artwork features an Ampeg Dan Armstrong guitar.

== Live performances ==
The band claimed it was the hardest song from In Your Honor to play live. "DOA" was played often on the In Your Honor tour and the Echoes Silence Patience and Grace tour. It was played just once on the Wasting Light tour. It was not played again until the Sonic Highways tour in 2015, where it was requested by a group of fans. It hasn't been played live since then.

== Track listings ==
CD1
No.	Title	Length
1.	"DOA"	4:12
2.	"I Feel Free" (Cream cover)	2:56

CD2
No.	Title	Length
1.	"DOA"	4:12
2.	"Skin and Bones"	3:35
3.	"I Feel Free" (Cream cover)	2:56
4.	"Best of You" (video)	4:17

Yellow vinyl
No.	Title	Length
1.	"DOA"	4:12
2.	"Razor" (live acoustic version)	4:48

== Personnel ==
Personnel taken from In Your Honor liner notes. (Note: The band members' instruments are not credited in the album's liner notes. Their primary instruments are listed based on their de facto primary roles in the group.)

Foo Fighters

- Dave Grohl – vocals, rhythm guitar
- Chris Shiflett – lead guitar
- Nate Mendel – bass guitar
- Taylor Hawkins – drums

Production

- Nick Raskulinecz – production, mixing
- Foo Fighters – production
- Mike Terry – engineering
- Bob Ludwig – mastering

== Charts ==
=== Weekly charts ===
Weekly chart performance for "DOA"
Chart (2005–2006)	Peak position
Australia (ARIA)	39
Canada (Nielsen BDS)	16
Canada Rock Top 30 (Radio & Records)	1
Ireland (IRMA)	40
Netherlands (Mega Top 50)	24
Netherlands (Single Top 100)	86
New Zealand (Recorded Music NZ)	34
Quebec Airplay (ADISQ)	43
Scottish Singles Sales (Official Charts)	23
UK Singles (Official Charts)	25
UK Rock & Metal (Official Charts)	1
US Billboard Hot 100	68
US Alternative Airplay (Billboard)	1
US Mainstream Rock (Billboard)	5

=== Year-end charts ===
2005 year-end chart performance for "DOA"
Chart (2005)	Position
US Modern Rock Tracks (Billboard)	38

2006 year-end chart performance for "DOA"
Chart (2006)	Position
US Alternative Songs (Billboard)	20
US Mainstream Rock Songs (Billboard)	36

== Certifications ==
Certifications and sales for "DOA"
Region	Certification	Certified units/sales
Australia (ARIA)	Gold	35,000^{‡}
United States (RIAA)	Gold	500,000^{*}
^{*} Sales figures based on certification alone.^{‡} Sales+streaming figures based on certification alone.

== Other versions ==
- An early version of the song, listed as a demo, was released on the CD1 version of the "Resolve" single and Five Songs and a Cover.
- A version recorded on August 23, 2005 at Maida Vale Studios in London for the BBC Radio 1 was released on the Radio 1's Live Lounge compilation.
- A live version filmed at Hyde Park on June 17, 2006 was released on the Live at Hyde Park DVD.
