= In Your Honor =

2005 studio album by Foo Fighters

Studio album by Foo Fighters
- Released: June 14, 2005
- Recorded: January–March 2005
- Studio: Studio 606 West (Los Angeles)
- Genres: Alternative rock; post-grunge; hard rock; acoustic rock
- Length: 83:17
- Labels: Roswell; RCA
- Producers: Nick Raskulinecz; Foo Fighters

Foo Fighters chronology
One by One (2002)	In Your Honor (2005)	Five Songs and a Cover (2005)

Singles from In Your Honor
- 1. "Best of You" Released: May 30, 2005; 2. "DOA" Released: September 5, 2005; 3. "Resolve" Released: November 21, 2005 (EU); 4. "No Way Back/Cold Day in the Sun" Released: March 13, 2006 (EU)

In Your Honor is the fifth studio album by American rock band Foo Fighters, released on June 14, 2005, through Roswell and RCA Records. It is a double album, with the first disc containing heavy rock songs and the second containing mellower acoustic songs. Frontman Dave Grohl decided to do a diverse blend of songs, as he felt that after ten years of existence, the band had to break new ground with their music. The album was recorded at a newly built studio in Northridge, Los Angeles, and features guests such as John Paul Jones (Led Zeppelin), Norah Jones, and Josh Homme (Queens of the Stone Age). Its lyrics deal with both resonating and introspective themes, with a major influence from Grohl's involvement on the campaign trail with John Kerry during the 2004 presidential election. It was the first album to feature keyboardist Rami Jaffee, although he would not join the band as full-time member until 2016.

The promotional tour for the album included both rock shows in stadiums and acoustic gigs in smaller venues. Reviews for In Your Honor were mostly positive, praising the composition and sound, although some critics found the album overlong and inconsistent. The album was also nominated for five Grammy Awards, and topped the charts in five countries—including Australia—and reached the top five in five more, including number two in both the United States and the United Kingdom. In Your Honor also broke the band's consecutive streak of Grammy Award for Best Rock Album wins that began in 2001 with There Is Nothing Left to Lose.

== Background ==
After touring in support of One by One, Dave Grohl was uncertain on what to do next with the Foo Fighters. He felt that rushing to do another record would not be creatively rewarding. Grohl considered a possible film score, and began writing acoustic songs, eventually amassing a full album's worth of songs. Grohl, not wanting to make a solo album and accepting the drift from his usual style, brought the songs to the Foo Fighters – "who's to say what we should sound like?". Bassist Nate Mendel replied that the songs' uncharacteristic sound was "why [they] should go on the record." Grohl decided against an acoustic record, saying "I have to have loud rock music in my life somewhere", and decided to make a double album, with "one CD that's all the really heavy rock shit" and another "that's really beautiful, acoustic-based, lower dynamic stuff", which Grohl described as "the bottle and the hangover", and also with the rock record being "my Jack and Coke record" with songs that "I realise I cannot live without that", and the acoustic being "my Sapphire-and-Martini-with-Kylie record". Grohl also stated a decisive moment in making a double album was uploading demos to his computer and realizing he had five hours of music, adding that "we've been a band for 10 years now, this is our fifth record, and I thought it would be boring to just keep making album after album and making videos and playing festivals, so I wanted to do something special."

The album was recorded in a new recording studio built in a warehouse in Northridge, California, named Studio 606 West in contrast to the original Studio 606 in Grohl's basement in Alexandria, Virginia. Development for In Your Honor took nine months with three and a half months installing equipment in the studio, and songs being written throughout 2004. While waiting for 606 to get finished, the band rehearsed on North Hollywood's Mates Rehearsal Studios, where "we ended up with three or four different versions of about 30 songs", according to Raskulinecz who added that "it got to the point where I didn't want them to play the rock songs anymore. I was afraid they were going to get stale."

== Recording ==
The sessions ran from January to March 2005, with only two and a half weeks spent on the acoustic record. Forty tracks were recorded – fifteen of them acoustic – with half of them ending on the final track list. Studio 606 was not finished as the band moved in, and the band members even helped with the final stages of construction, "hammering, stuffing insulation — doing whatever to speed the process." Eight of the rock songs were last-minute compositions done after the acoustic record was finished, as "Dave started feeling that it was better than the rock record." The songs were recorded on analog tape—which was reused over and over due to a tape shortage and a desire to save money—before being transferred to Pro Tools for overdubs, editing and mixing. Raskulinecz mixed the rock songs, while Elliot Scheiner mixed the stereo and 5.1 versions of the acoustic sides.

The band entered the studio with most of the songs finished and rehearsed; producer Nick Raskulinecz, who also worked on One by One, stated that while "One By One was very loose, "In Your Honor was more planned out. Dave was more meticulous on that one". The electric album was done in segments by instrument, starting with the drums and guitars, then vocals, and finally bass. Mendel would write a bass line on Pro Tools at home before showing it to Grohl and Raskulinecz. The bass was recorded after the vocals, which Raskulinecz said was done because "By doing bass last, you can really tailor it for tuning, parts and sound. If you do the drums and then the guitars, you can fill the hole that's left with bass. And sometimes that hole wants a certain frequency that isn't traditional for bass, but you have to go with it, which is even more fun."

During the last three weeks of work on the rock songs, the band was in the studio "from noon to eight in the morning, making the rock record the most devastating thing we've ever done". After two months on the rock songs, approaching their established deadline, the band held a meeting and decided that, to finish, "Everyone has to be here all day. We need to do one song a day and no one's leaving until that song is done." Grohl would listen to a click track, "We'd find a tempo and I'd just roll an arrangement off the top of my head." As the members recorded their parts, Grohl would write the lyrics. The rushed approach prevented Mendel writing bass lines, so he ended up "concentrating on just finding the notes and getting the rhythm right."

"I look at this album as kind of the end of one chapter and the beginning of something new… With the rock record, we finally got the aggressive, anthemic thing down. With the acoustic album, it offers some kind of look into the future of things we're capable of doing and the direction we could move if we wanted to."

— Dave Grohl on the double album's nature

Grohl declared that "making this record revitalized this band", particularly the acoustic songs, as they "showed ourselves what we're capable of doing" and "[made] things scary again. You do something that you've never done, and it makes you feel like a bigger band." The frontman also stated the mellower acoustic disc was an opportunity to use "the acoustic tracks we wrote in the past eight or nine years, but never put on albums because they never seemed to fit", particularly because Grohl felt that "it's hard to put an acoustic song in the middle of a rock record, because sometimes it mucks up the sequence." The tracks include Grohl's first composition "Friend of a Friend" – done in 1990, and previously recorded under the pseudonym 'Late!' on the cassette Pocketwatch; "Razor", which Grohl wrote for a benefit concert at the Wiltern Theatre; and drummer Taylor Hawkins' composition "Cold Day in the Sun", which after an attempt to do an electric version became an unplugged track, featuring Hawkins on vocals and tambourine and Grohl in the drums.

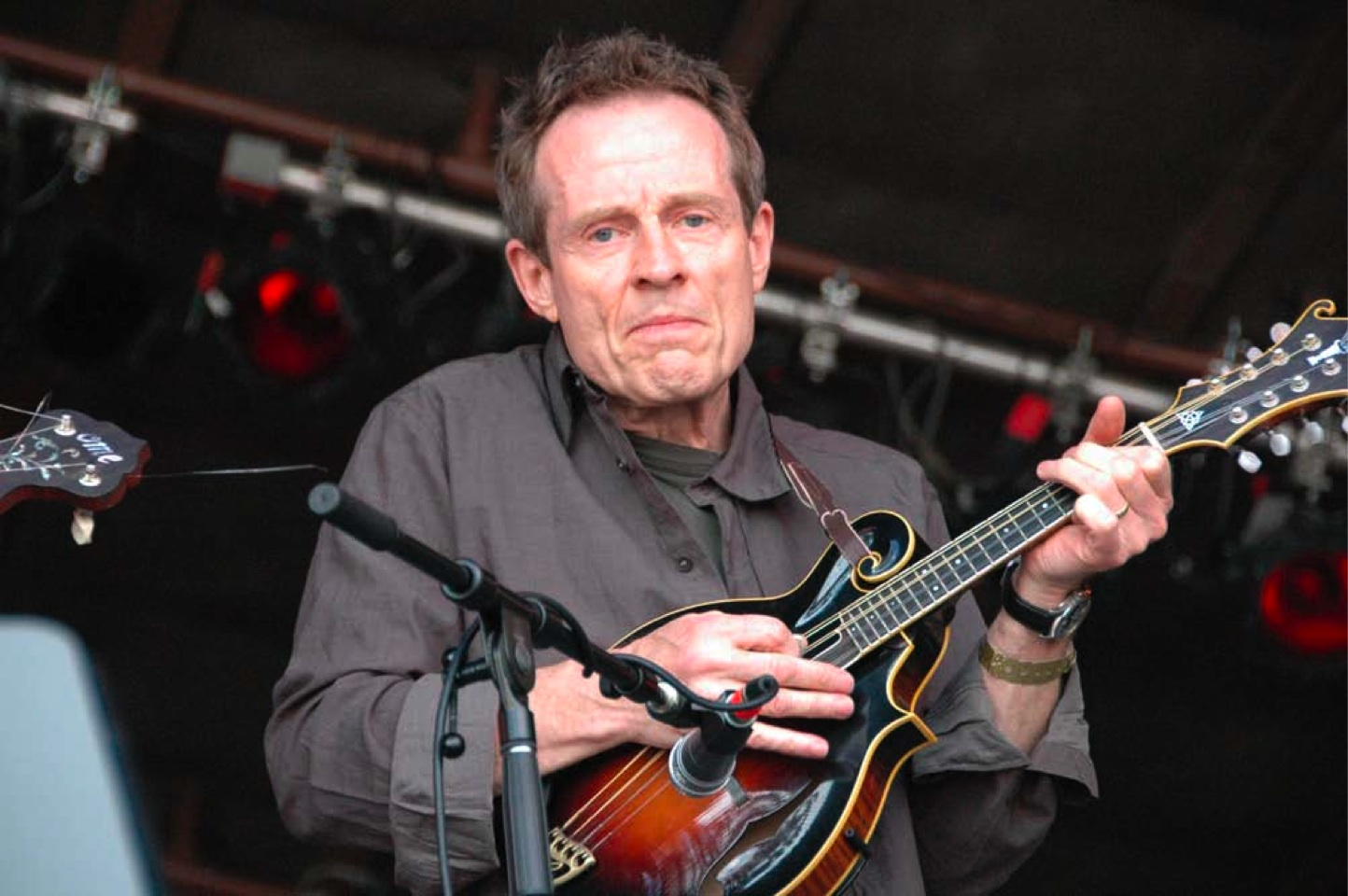
John Paul Jones is featured in two tracks.

Preparing the acoustic album, Grohl decided he would improve it with guest appearances, and made a list of musicians he would like to work with, such as Warren Haynes and Grant Hart. Guests that appeared on the record included Norah Jones, John Paul Jones of Led Zeppelin, and Josh Homme of Queens of the Stone Age.

John Paul Jones agreed to appear as he was in Los Angeles for the Grammy Awards. Grohl described his appearance as the "second-greatest thing to happen to me in my life" behind his marriage. "I love Dave," Jones said, "and I enjoyed playing on that Foo Fighters album."

Norah Jones was brought for the bossa nova "Virginia Moon" after Grohl heard her record and considered that his song was "her vibe" and Jones' voice "was so smooth and warm that I figured it would work out great with mine." The song features Grohl's guitar technician Joe Beebe on lead guitar, as he was the only one in the crew with jazz experience.

The Wallflowers' keyboard player Rami Jaffee and That Dog.'s violinist Petra Haden also contributed to the album, and were later drafted for the Foo Fighters' touring band. After the album was finished, Grohl stated that he hoped that the Foo Fighters were most remembered for this record. He described it as "just the most fucking kick-ass thing we've ever done" and said, "If someone asked me which Led Zeppelin album to buy, I would tell them Physical Graffiti, because it has such a wide dynamic and it shows the range that band had. And that's what we wanted to do with this album."

== Composition ==
"Best of You"
A sample of "Best of You", the first single released from the album.

"Miracle"
A sample of "Miracle", a song from the album's acoustic disc.

The double album has a disc of rock songs and another with acoustic ones, which Grohl said demonstrated his artistic freedom – "It's not one specific genre of music, it's not one specific style. I'm just a musician. I can play all these different instruments, I can write a bossa nova, I can write a thrash tune." He also stated that he tried to fit the Foo Fighters sound even with stylistic differences: "It's still the same four guys playing it so it just is a Foo Fighters song, whether it sounds like Carcass or fucking Ry Cooder."

The band tried to do the albums without a "middle ground" sound, with "the acoustic record far more delicate and beautiful and atmospheric", and "the rock CD far more brutal and aggressive" than their previous work. The arrangements were aiming for complexity: "This record is much more elaborate than just an acoustic guitar and a vocal. And the songs were written to hold more orchestration. We've never had accordions and pump organs and cellos and stand up bass." The acoustic guitar sound has influences of Rush guitarist Alex Lifeson, with open notes in conjunction with fretted notes.

The lyrics on the rock album tried to focus on "general themes that everyone can get their hands on", while the acoustic had introspective lyrics that are "vulnerable and revealing", with things Grohl "wouldn't say out loud, wouldn't even admit to myself." Grohl declared that "when you're writing songs that have a sort of anthemic quality, you can't really go lighthearted and sing about bullshit. You have to dig into a deeper place to find the words", and that "I don't know what it is about, this album, that makes it sound more heartfelt or deeper or more emotional, but when I listen to it, it really is." These include "Friend of a Friend", a song which Grohl wrote in the 1990s about himself and his former Nirvana bandmate Kurt Cobain during the time they shared an apartment together in 1990, and "Still", talking about a suicide Grohl saw when he was ten in Virginia, by a boy who jumped on the train tracks. Much of the album's theme and content, including the title, came after Grohl spent time on the campaign trail with John Kerry during the 2004 presidential election. "We'd pull in to small towns, and thousands of people would come to be rescued by this man", said Grohl. "It's not a political record, but what I saw inspired me."

== Release and promotion ==
The price of the album was just one dollar above what is paid for a regular single-disc CD, as Grohl thought the albums "complemented each other in one package, and I don't need any more money". The first 25,000 US copies were in a special edition DualDisc set containing a "making of" documentary in the first disc, and the second disc in 5.1 surround sound. RCA also issued 5,000 copies of a quadruple vinyl LP record. Distributor Sony BMG issued the album with the copy protection software MediaMax CD-3, which later led to a scandal as its rootkit-like nature made computers vulnerable to malware.

The promotional campaign included the MTV special 24 Hours of Foo. Lead single "Best of You" was released on May 30, 2005, and became the band's highest-charting single at the main American, British, and Australian charts. Follow-up "DOA" was released on August 22, after an early debut as a ringtone for Cingular cell phones. Like "Best of You" it proceeded to top Billboard's Modern Rock Songs chart. "Resolve" and a double A-side of "No Way Back" and "Cold Day in the Sun" were also issued as singles. "No Way Back" was included in the video games Madden NFL 06 and Guitar Hero: Warriors of Rock. In addition, the song "Resolve" and "Miracle" in the TV series The West Wing where the band performed the latter two songs in "Election Day, Part 1" and "Election Day, Part 2" respectively. Nearly fifteen years after the album's release, "Razor" appeared on an episode of The Flash.

The release was promoted with the In Your Honor Tour. The tour began in the summer of 2005, and ran through to June 2006. It featured two shows per city, an electric one in arenas and an acoustic in smaller venues. The late 2005 concerts were part of the Foozer Tour, co-headlined with Weezer. Among the additional band for the acoustic shows was guitarist Pat Smear, who had been in the Foo Fighters from 1995 to 1997, and followed the In Your Honor Tour with another five years as a touring musician before rejoining as a full-time member for the recording of Wasting Light. The acoustic shows from August 29, 30 and 31, 2006 at the Pantages Theater in Los Angeles were turned into the live album Skin and Bones.

== Critical reception ==
Professional ratings
Aggregate scores
Source	Rating
Metacritic	70/100
Review scores
Source	Rating
AllMusic	4/5 stars
Entertainment Weekly	A / B+
The Guardian	3/5 stars
Los Angeles Times	3.5/4 stars
NME	7/10
Pitchfork	6.8/10
Q	3/5 stars
Rolling Stone	3/5 stars
Spin	B+
USA Today	2.5/4 stars

In Your Honor was generally met with positive reviews. At Metacritic, a website that assigns a normalized rating out of 100 to reviews from mainstream critics, the album received an average score of 70, based on 26 reviews.

Writing for The New York Times, Jon Pareles considered the album "an unexpected magnum opus", and while Pareles felt that "the rock CD overpowers the acoustic one", he considered that "among the quieter songs, there are enough supple melodies and hypnotic guitar patterns to suggest fine prospects for a follow-through album". Tom Sinclair of Entertainment Weekly described the discs of In Your Honor as "the outdoors and indoors sides", with the rockers "pack[ing] an intoxicating wallop: 90-proof rock for 90-degree weather, they'll sound terrific blasting from convertibles, open windows, boom boxes, and at barbecues and beach parties" and the acoustic songs "all very pretty—sometimes scarily so", ultimately concluding that "you'll probably revisit the rockin' half more often". AllMusic's Stephen Thomas Erlewine considered that the record "showcases a reinvigorated band that is eager to stretch out and experiment", with the rock record having a "fluid musicality and a new found sense of drama that gives it a nearly cinematic sense of scope", and the acoustic album being "quieter, but it also has a similar flow and easy grace that makes it a fitting complement to the harder first record." Reviewer Joe Gross of Spin described the hard rock disc as "the most consistent rockers of Grohl's career" and considered that the album as a whole "chronicle[s] the physical and mental graffiti of figuring out how to emerge from some very large shadows, including his own, with nerve and power" While Mike Schiller of PopMatters considered that "In Your Honor has some great tunes, but it is by no means perfect", he praised the rock songs for "indications of just how loud this band can get", and regarding the acoustic tracks, wrote that "despite the down-tempo feel, the songs are infectious".

Some reviewers found In Your Honor overlong and inconsistent. Writing for Rolling Stone, Barry Walters praised the acoustic songs, while considering that In Your Honor "could have been easily pruned down to one disc", claiming the rock songs besides "Resolve" "strain so hard that the melody gets lost" and went in a "cartoonish headbanging fashion" that "accentuates the band's self-inflicted one-dimensionality", and that the "sameness and vagueness of [Grohl's] love lyrics blunt their impact". Noel Murray of The A.V. Club criticized the acoustic disc as "gooey, undercooked, and embarrassingly unpalatable" and "reveal[ing] Dave Grohl's songwriting shortcomings", but praised the rock songs which are "as loud and assaultive as just about anything Grohl has ever recorded", and considered that the "first 10-song set sounds especially tight and ferocious; it's not all that diminished by the unfortunate revelations of disc two". BBC Music reviewer Tanya Byrne found the track list lacking, with "several songs on this double disk that stand head and shoulders above the rest and truly represent how the Foo Fighters have developed" while others "let the album down" and the record ultimately "doesn't live up to the hype." Bram Teitelman of Billboard felt that "by isolating the electric and acoustic sides, the concept comes off as repetitious" and ultimately concluding that "by scaling back their ambitions, the Foos could have made one great album instead of two average ones." Pitchfork's Amanda Petrusich described the record as "sterile and controlled", the double disc conceit as "heavy handed, the segregation too deliberate" and the rock songs as repetitive. Edna Gundersen of USA Today gave the album two-and-a-half stars out of four and said, "Though its most smartly crafted tunes and liveliest performances don't measure up to the band's finest, Honor is an honorable effort, full of the brawn and vigor that keeps the Foos in fighting shape."

== Commercial performance ==
The album entered the Billboard 200 and the UK Albums Chart at number two behind Coldplay's X&Y (the worldwide best selling album of 2005) with the strongest initial sales of their entire career this far–310,500 copies in the United States and 159,179 in the UK. In Your Honor also topped the charts in Australia, Finland, New Zealand and Ireland, and reached the top five in Canada, Austria and Denmark.

As of December 2011, In Your Honor has sold 1,442,000 units in North America, being their third most successful album behind Foo Fighters and The Colour and the Shape. It was also certified Platinum by the RIAA. The album reached multi-platinum status in Canada, Australia and the United Kingdom.

=== Accolades ===
The album was up for five Grammy Awards at the 48th Grammy Awards: Best Rock Album, Best Surround Sound Album, both Best Rock Song and Best Rock Performance by a Duo or Group with Vocal for "Best of You", and Best Pop Collaboration with Vocals for "Virginia Moon". It ultimately lost all awards, the band's first album since The Colour and the Shape to not receive a Grammy. Kerrang! ranked In Your Honor as the 9th best album of 2005, while Rolling Stone put it as 30th best.

== Track listing ==
All tracks are written by Foo Fighters (Dave Grohl, Taylor Hawkins, Nate Mendel, Chris Shiflett), except where noted.

Disc one (electric)
No.	Title	Length
1.	"In Your Honor"	3:50
2.	"No Way Back"	3:17
3.	"Best of You"	4:16
4.	"DOA"	4:12
5.	"Hell"	1:57
6.	"The Last Song"	3:19
7.	"Free Me"	4:39
8.	"Resolve"	4:49
9.	"The Deepest Blues Are Black"	3:58
10.	"End Over End"	5:52
Total length:		40:02

Disc two (acoustic)
No.	Title	Writer(s)	Length
1.	"Still"		5:15
2.	"What If I Do?"		5:02
3.	"Miracle"		3:29
4.	"Another Round"		4:25
5.	"Friend of a Friend"	Grohl	3:13
6.	"Over and Out"		5:16
7.	"On the Mend"		4:31
8.	"Virginia Moon"		3:49
9.	"Cold Day in the Sun"	Hawkins	3:20
10.	"Razor"	Grohl	4:53
Total length:			Disc two: 43:15; Total: 83:17

UK/Japan/Vinyl/iTunes bonus track
No.	Title	Length
11.	"The Sign"	4:02

== Personnel ==
Personnel taken from In Your Honor liner notes. (Note: The band members' instruments are not credited in the album's liner notes, except for Hawkins' vocals and Grohl's drums on "Cold Day in the Sun". Their primary instruments are listed based on their de facto primary roles in the group.)

Foo Fighters

- Dave Grohl – vocals, rhythm guitar, tambourine, drums on "Cold Day in the Sun"
- Taylor Hawkins – drums, vocals and tambourine on "Cold Day in the Sun"
- Nate Mendel – bass guitar
- Chris Shiflett – lead guitar

Additional musicians

- Joe Beebe – guitar on "Virginia Moon"
- Danny Clinch – harmonica on "Another Round"
- Petra Haden – violin on "Miracle"
- Josh Homme – guitar on "Razor"
- Rami Jaffee – keyboards on "Still", "What If I Do?", "Another Round", "Over and Out", "On the Mend" and "Cold Day in the Sun"
- John Paul Jones – piano on "Miracle" and mandolin on "Another Round"
- Norah Jones – vocals and piano on "Virginia Moon"
- Nick Raskulinecz – double bass on "On the Mend" and bass guitar on "Cold Day in the Sun"

Production

- Nick Raskulinecz – production, mixing (disc 1)
- Foo Fighters – production
- Mike Terry – engineering
- Elliot Scheiner – mixing (disc 2)
- Bob Ludwig – mastering

Design

- Dan Winters – photography
- Danny Clinch – additional photos
- Brett Kilroe – additional art and "Crest" concept
- Robin C. Hendrickson – additional art and "Crest" concept
- Kevin Reagan – art direction, design
- Bret Healey – design

== Charts ==
=== Weekly charts ===
2005 weekly chart performance
Chart (2005)	Peak position
Australian Albums (ARIA)	1
Austrian Albums (Ö3 Austria)	5
Belgian Albums (Ultratop Flanders)	3
Belgian Albums (Ultratop Wallonia)	21
Canadian Albums (Billboard)	3
Danish Albums (Hitlisten)	5
Dutch Albums (Album Top 100)	9
European Albums (Billboard)	3
Finnish Albums (Suomen virallinen lista)	1
French Albums (SNEP)	21
German Albums (Offizielle Top 100)	4
Irish Albums (IRMA)	2
Italian Albums (FIMI)	20
Japanese Albums (Oricon)	11
New Zealand Albums (RMNZ)	1
Norwegian Albums (VG-lista)	2
Portuguese Albums (AFP)	20
Spanish Albums (Promusicae)	31
Swedish Albums (Sverigetopplistan)	1
Swiss Albums (Schweizer Hitparade)	7
UK Albums (Official Charts)	2
UK Rock & Metal Albums (Official Charts)	3
US Billboard 200	2

=== Year-end charts ===
2005 year-end chart performance
Chart (2005)	Position
Australian Albums (ARIA)	10
Austrian Albums (Ö3 Austria)	42
Belgian Albums (Ultratop Flanders)	29
Belgian Alternative Albums (Ultratop Flanders)	20
Danish Albums (Hitlisten)	92
Dutch Albums (Album Top 100)	90
European Albums (Billboard)	43
Finnish Albums (Suomen viralinen lista)	27
German Albums (Offizielle Top 100)	62
New Zealand Albums (RMNZ)	6
Swedish Albums (Sverigetopplistan)	65
Swedish Albums & Compilations (Sverigetopplistan)	84
Swiss Albums (Schweizer Hitparade)	99
UK Albums (OCC)	27
US Billboard 200	54
Worldwide Albums (IFPI)	23

2006 year-end chart performance
Chart (2006)	Position
Australian Albums (ARIA)	96

=== Decade-end chart ===
2000s decade-end chart performance
Chart (2000–09)	Position
Australian Albums (ARIA)	86

== Certifications ==
Sales certifications for In Your Honor
Region	Certification	Certified units/sales
Australia (ARIA)	3× Platinum	210,000^{^}
Austria (IFPI Austria)	Gold	15,000^{*}
Brazil (Pro-Música Brasil)	Gold	50,000^{*}
Canada (Music Canada)	3× Platinum	300,000^{^}
Germany (BVMI)	Gold	100,000^{‡}
Ireland (IRMA)	2× Platinum	30,000^{^}
Japan (RIAJ)	Gold	100,000^{^}
New Zealand (RMNZ)	4× Platinum	60,000^{^}
Norway (IFPI Norway)	Gold	20,000^{*}
Sweden (GLF)	Gold	30,000^{^}
United Kingdom (BPI)	2× Platinum	812,000
United States (RIAA)	Platinum	1,000,000^{^}
^{*} Sales figures based on certification alone.^{^} Shipments figures based on certification alone.^{‡} Sales+streaming figures based on certification alone.
