= Best of You =

2005 single by Foo Fighters

- Standard artwork

Single by Foo Fighters

from the album In Your Honor
- Released: May 30, 2005
- Recorded: January–March 2005
- Genre: Alternative rock; hard rock
- Length: 4:16
- Label: RCA; Roswell; Sony BMG
- Songwriters: Dave Grohl; Taylor Hawkins; Nate Mendel; Chris Shiflett
- Producers: Nick Raskulinecz; Foo Fighters

Foo Fighters singles chronology
| "Have It All" (2003) | "Best of You" (2005) | "DOA" (2005) |

Music video
- "Best of You" on YouTube

"Best of You" is a song by American rock band Foo Fighters, released as the lead single from the band's fifth studio album, In Your Honor (2005). Dave Grohl notes that the song was written following appearances at 2004 American presidential candidate John Kerry's campaign trail and is "about breaking away from the things that confine you". The song holds the band's highest chart peak in the U.S. (number 18), the UK (number four), and Australia (number five), and was nominated for a Grammy Award for Best Rock Song. The song won the Kerrang! Award for Best Single. It also topped Billboard's Hot Mainstream Rock Tracks chart for four weeks and Hot Modern Rock Tracks chart for seven weeks. Following the band's performance at Live Earth, the song again entered the UK charts at number 38.

In September 2023, for the 35th anniversary of Hot Modern Rock Tracks (which by then had been renamed to Alternative Airplay), Billboard ranked "Best of You" at number 91 on its list of the 100 most successful songs in the chart's history.

== Background ==
"Best of You" was one of the first compositions for In Your Honor, written by Dave Grohl in his garage following his involvement on the campaign trail for John Kerry. Once the Foo Fighters recorded a demo, they shelved it feeling they could do better. It was only brought back for further production by manager John Silva, who felt "Best of You"'s absence while listening to what they had recorded that far. Taylor Hawkins declared that it was the only song from the rock disc of that album that remained from the original sessions along with "No Way Back".

Grohl stated that while many of his songs start with the music and lyrics come last, the words for "Best of You" were fast to write. Given the Kerry rallies inspired him to do "all these songs about breaking away from the things that confine you", thus came "a song of resistance. It’s about the refusal to be taken advantage of by something that’s bigger than you, or someone you’re in love with. It’s the fight in the face of adversity." Grohl added that "Most people think it's a love song but it's meant to be more universal, which I think is one of the reasons so many people sing along when we play it." The composition had no interest in "an interesting melody", instead featuring "a rhythm that we'd never really used on any of the other albums." The focus was on a strong performance, where Grohl could "scream the whole way through". During the first rehearsals, Grohl came close to injuring his throat and felt afraid of being unable to perform live, but eventually considered he could pull it off as "when you go out and sing words from the heart, you scream twice as hard.”

== Music video ==
The music video was directed by Mark Pellington, best known for his work on the video for "Jeremy" by Pearl Jam. He was inspired by the death of his wife a few months prior to the shoot, and was drawn to the song's notion of dealing with pain in life.

The video features the band playing on top of the abandoned Linda Vista Community Hospital. Along with the band's scenes are clips that show pain, depression, or anger:

- Children playing alone or with each other, one scene shows one girl hugging another.
- A car crash
- A lion pouncing on its prey, which is a vulture
- A snake attacking a rodent
- A newborn baby sleeping
- A zebra kicking another zebra behind itself
- A snarling wolf
- Crash test dummies being crushed by a car crash test
- Men and women showing affection for each other
- A nuclear explosion
- A baby crying
- A mother and child laying on the bed
- A wall covered in writing, including the phrases "help me", "pain feels good" and "they all died in the fire I started."

== Critical reception ==
"Best of You" is widely regarded as one of the Foo Fighters' best songs. Kerrang and American Songwriter both ranked the song number four on their lists of the greatest Foo Fighters songs.

== Accolades ==
| Year | Publication | Country | Accolade | Rank |
|---|---|---|---|---|
| 2019 | The Guardian | United Kingdom | Dave Grohl's Landmark Songs | N/A |

== Track listing ==
CD1
| No. | Title | Length |
|---|---|---|
| 1. | "Best of You" | 4:16 |
| 2. | "I'm in Love with a German Film Star" (The Passions cover) | 4:21 |

CD2
| No. | Title | Length |
|---|---|---|
| 1. | "Best of You" | 4:16 |
| 2. | "FFL" | 2:31 |
| 3. | "Kiss the Bottle" (Jawbreaker cover) | 4:04 |
| 4. | "What an Honour (interview video clip)" |

7" vinyl
| No. | Title | Length |
|---|---|---|
| 1. | "Best of You" | 4:16 |
| 2. | "Spill" | 3:30 |

== Personnel ==
Personnel taken from In Your Honor liner notes. (Note: The band members' instruments are not credited in the album's liner notes. Their primary instruments are listed based on their de facto primary roles in the group.)

Foo Fighters

- Dave Grohl – vocals, rhythm guitar
- Chris Shiflett – lead guitar
- Nate Mendel – bass guitar
- Taylor Hawkins – drums

Production

- Nick Raskulinecz – production, mixing
- Foo Fighters – production
- Mike Terry – engineering
- Bob Ludwig – mastering

== Charts ==
=== Weekly charts ===
| Chart (2005) | Peak position |
|---|---|
| Australia (ARIA) | 5 |
| Belgium (Ultratip Bubbling Under Flanders) | 3 |
| Belgium (Ultratip Bubbling Under Wallonia) | 11 |
| Canada Rock Top 30 (Radio & Records) | 1 |
| Europe (Eurochart Hot 100) | 14 |
| Hungary (Single Top 40) | 9 |
| Ireland (IRMA) | 20 |
| Italy (FIMI) | 36 |
| Netherlands (Mega Top 50) | 37 |
| Netherlands (Single Top 100) | 94 |
| New Zealand (Recorded Music NZ) | 38 |
| Norway (VG-lista) | 23 |
| Quebec Airplay (ADISQ) | 21 |
| Scottish Singles Sales (Official Charts) | 3 |
| Sweden (Sverigetopplistan) | 41 |
| UK Singles (Official Charts) | 4 |
| UK Rock & Metal (Official Charts) | 1 |
| US Billboard Hot 100 | 18 |
| US Adult Pop Airplay (Billboard) | 38 |
| US Alternative Airplay (Billboard) | 1 |
| US Mainstream Rock (Billboard) | 1 |

| Chart (2012) | Peak position |
|---|---|
| Austria (Ö3 Austria Top 40) | 74 |
| Germany (GfK) | 85 |

=== Year-end charts ===
| Chart (2005) | Position |
|---|---|
| UK Singles (OCC) | 62 |
| US Billboard Hot 100 | 68 |
| US Mainstream Rock Tracks (Billboard) | 4 |
| US Modern Rock Tracks (Billboard) | 1 |
| Venezuela (Record Report) | 27 |

== Certifications ==
| Region | Certification | Certified units/sales |
|---|---|---|
| Australia (ARIA) | 5× Platinum | 350,000^{‡} |
| Brazil (Pro-Música Brasil) | Platinum | 60,000^{‡} |
| Canada (Music Canada) | Gold | 10,000^{*} |
| Denmark (IFPI Danmark) | Gold | 45,000^{‡} |
| Germany (BVMI) | Gold | 150,000^{‡} |
| Italy (FIMI) | Gold | 25,000^{‡} |
| Mexico (AMPROFON) | 3× Platinum+Gold | 210,000^{‡} |
| New Zealand (RMNZ) | 3× Platinum | 90,000^{‡} |
| Spain (Promusicae) | Gold | 30,000^{‡} |
| United Kingdom (BPI) | 2× Platinum | 1,200,000^{‡} |
| United States (RIAA) | 2× Platinum | 2,000,000^{‡} |
^{*} Sales figures based on certification alone.^{‡} Sales+streaming figures based on certification alone.

== Release history ==
| Region | Date | Format(s) | Label(s) | Ref. |
|---|---|---|---|---|
| United States | April 25, 2005 | Mainstream rock; active rock; alternative radio | RCA; Roswell; Sony BMG | |
| Australia | May 30, 2005 | CD | RCA; Roswell; Sony BMG | |
| United Kingdom | May 30, 2005 | 7-inch vinyl; CD | RCA; Roswell; Sony BMG | |
| United States | June 20, 2005 | Contemporary hit radio | RCA; Roswell; Sony BMG | |
| United States | July 18, 2005 | Hot adult contemporary radio | RCA; Roswell; Sony BMG | |

== Covers ==
- Prince covered the song during the halftime show at Super Bowl XLI in Miami, Florida, on February 4, 2007. Drummer Taylor Hawkins expressed surprise at the performance, due to Prince's prior criticism of the band's desire to release a cover version of his song "Darling Nikki" in 2003.
- During the Australian X Factor's fifth season in 2013, eventual series winner, Dami Im opened the rock-themed fifth live show with a rousing cover of the song and received an unprecedented fifth consecutive standing ovation. Im's performance of "Best of You" debuted at number 78 on the Australian Singles Chart. Having won the series, Im recorded a version for her self-titled album which debuted at number one in the charts and was certified Platinum eventually.
- Russian singer Lena Katina covered the song during her 2013 concert in Cologne, Germany, and it was later included in her first live album European Fan Weekend 2013 Live.

=== Anastacia version ===
"Best of You"

Single by Anastacia

from the album It's a Man's World
- Released: 2 November 2012
- Recorded: 2011–12
- Genre: Rock
- Length: 4:20
- Label: BMG; Rough Trade
- Songwriters: Dave Grohl; Taylor Hawkins; Nate Mendel; Chris Shiflett
- Producer: Glen Ballard

Anastacia singles chronology
| "Dream On" (2012) | "Best of You" (2012) | "Stupid Little Things" (2014) |

Music video
- "Best of You" on YouTube

Anastacia covered the song for her fifth studio album It's a Man's World. The song was released as the album's second single, only in Austria, Germany, Switzerland and Italy. The music video was filmed in Barcelona, Spain, in October 2012.

==== Release history ====
| Region | Date | Format |
|---|---|---|
| Austria | 2 November 2012 | Digital download |
| Germany | 2 November 2012 | Digital download |
| Switzerland | 2 November 2012 | Digital download |
| Russia | 14 December 2012 | Contemporary hit radio |
