= Friend of a Friend (Foo Fighters song) =

Song by Foo Fighters

from the album In Your Honor
- Released: 1992, 1998, 2005, 2006
- Recorded: 1990/1997/2005/2006
- Genre: Acoustic rock
- Length: 3:13
- Label: Simple Machines (1992); Melody Maker (1998); RCA (2005 and 2006)
- Songwriter: Dave Grohl
- Producers: Barrett Jones, Geoff Turner (1990), Simon Askew (1997), Nick Raskulinecz, Dave Grohl, Nate Mendel, Taylor Hawkins, Chris Shiflett (2005), Gil Norton (2006)

"Friend of a Friend" is an acoustic song by Foo Fighters, featured on their 2005 album In Your Honor. The song is performed solely by Foo Fighters' guitarist/lead vocalist Dave Grohl.

An earlier version of this song was recorded in 1990, after Grohl had joined the band Nirvana.

== Song history ==
"Friend of a Friend" was the first acoustic song Dave Grohl had ever written.

The song was written by Grohl in 1990 (and recorded in secret the same year), and it was about his first impressions of new Nirvana bandmates Kurt Cobain and Krist Novoselic. He first wrote it in Kurt's Olympia apartment when Grohl stumbled upon an acoustic guitar owned by Cobain (referring to the lyrics "It was his friend's guitar"). The recorded song was released in 1992 in a collection of songs (entitled Pocketwatch) under the pseudonym 'Late!'

On April 30, 1997, the song was recorded for a BBC Evening Session. In 2005, Grohl revisited the song, recording it again for the acoustic disc of the Foo Fighters' In Your Honor. The song was also included on the band's live album Skin and Bones.

== Reception ==
Uncut praises the song, calling it an "uncharacteristically spiked critique of slackerdom that bears an eerie Cobain influence".

== Accolades ==
Year	Publication	Country	Accolade	Rank
2019	The Guardian	United Kingdom	Dave Grohl's Landmark Songs	N/A

== Recording and release history ==
=== Studio versions ===
Date recorded	Studio	Producer	Releases	Personnel
1990	WGNS Studios or Upland Studios, US	Barrett Jones, Geoff Turner	Pocketwatch (1992)	Dave Grohl: vocals, guitars
April 30, 1997	BBC Radio 1, UK	Unknown	Aired on BBC Evening Session in 1997. Later released on Melody Maker & BBC Radio 1 present Steve Lamacq's Bootleg Session cassette free with the March 7th 1998 issue of Melody Maker.	Dave Grohl: vocals, guitars, drums and bass
January–March 2005	Studio 606 West, Northridge, Los Angeles	Nick Raskulinecz	In Your Honor (2005)	Dave Grohl: vocals, guitar

=== Live versions ===
Date recorded	Venue	Releases	Personnel
August 29–31, 2006	Pantages Theatre, Los Angeles	Skin and Bones (2006)	Dave Grohl: vocals, guitar
