= Mike Terry (sound engineer) =

Music producer

Mike Terry is an American music producer, recording engineer, and mixer from Kalamazoo, Michigan.

== Career ==
Originally from Kalamazoo, Michigan, Terry moved west in the 1990s and landed his first jobs at L.A.'s The Village, then went on to work at Sound City Studios as an assistant engineer. Around the turn of the century, he became a freelance engineer and producer.

Terry has worked with The Eagles, Foo Fighters, Eric Hutchinson, Jessica Simpson, The Last Goodnight, Ash, Stone Sour, Jackson United, The Exies, The Blood Brothers, Everest, Sally Jaye, Reamonn, Ben Lee, Jay Brannan, Earliment, Rye Coalition, My Ruin, Fireball Ministry, Betty Blowtorch, Frank Black and the Catholics, 311, Halford, Treble Charger, Black Rebel Motorcycle Club, Verbena and more.

In 2006 Terry received a Grammy Award nomination for the Foo Fighters album In Your Honor.

In 2008 Terry helped unite several musicians to form the band Everest. He went on to produce, engineer and mix their first album "Ghost Notes" The album was recorded live in the studio entirely to analog tape. Everest was then signed to Neil Young’s Vapor Records.
