= Sonic Highways World Tour =

2014–15 concert tour by the Foo Fighters

- World tour by Foo Fighters
- Promotional poster for the tour
- Location: Africa; Asia; Europe; North America; Oceania; South America
- Associated album: Sonic Highways
- Start date: December 10, 2014
- End date: November 13, 2015
- Legs: 10
- No. of shows: 80
- Attendance: 1.76 million (69 shows)
- Box office: $131.2 million (69 shows)

Foo Fighters concert chronology
- Wasting Light World Tour (2011–12); Sonic Highways World Tour (2014–15); Concrete and Gold Tour (2017–18)

Sonic Highways World Tour was a concert tour by American rock band Foo Fighters, in support of their eighth studio album Sonic Highways. It began on December 10, 2014, in Cape Town, South Africa and continued through South America, Oceania, North America, Europe and Asia. The tour abruptly ended after the November 2015 Paris attacks which included the slaughter of fans and crew at a concert by fellow U.S. rock band Eagles of Death Metal. The band were playing in Bologna on the night of the attacks and had been due in Paris after leaving Italy.

The tour grossed $131.2 million and was attended by more than 1.76 million people. In 2015 alone it grossed $127 million and was attended by 1.68 million people, making it 5th highest grossing and 6th most attended concert tour of 2015.

== Background ==
The tour marked Foo Fighters' first concerts ever in South Africa, Colombia and South Korea. On most concerts there was a B-stage, where first acoustic songs were played before the band launched into cover versions. One exception was Slane Castle in Ireland, where rainy conditions prevented the usage of said stage.

During the concert in Gothenburg, Sweden on June 12, 2015, the lead vocalist of the band, Dave Grohl, fell off the stage early in the set and fractured his leg, but the rest of the band decided to continue performing while Grohl was attended to backstage by on-site medical staff, with the drummer Taylor Hawkins doing double-duty as lead vocalist. He returned to the stage just fifteen minutes later to finish the set in a chair and kept playing until the end of the concert. However, the remainder dates of the European leg were cancelled due to Grohl's leg fracture. This cost the band as much as $10 million in lost fees and travel expenses not offset by box office revenue.

Many artists joined the band on stage during the tour, including Perry Farrell, Stevie Nicks, Red Hot Chili Peppers' Chad Smith, Rage Against the Machine's Brad Wilk, members from Zac Brown Band, Bad Brains, HAIM, Jewel, among others. After the cancellation of their Glastonbury's headlining concert, Dave said that he intended to ask Paul McCartney and Kanye West to join the band during the performance.

== Opening acts ==
- 311 – South Africa
- Ash – Ireland
- BLK JKS – South Africa
- Comunidade Nin Jitsu – Brazil (only Porto Alegre)
- The Delta Riggs – Oceania
- Diamante Eléctrico – Colombia
- Dropkick Murphys – North America (Boston July 19, 2015)
- Eruca Sativa – Argentina
- Gary Clark Jr. – North America (selected dates)
- Ghost – Europe (only Norway and Sweden)
- God Damn – England (only Manchester)
- Hawk Eyes – Europe (only Hamburg)
- Hozier – Ireland
- Honeyblood – Scotland (only Edinburgh)
- Iggy Pop – England (only Milton Keynes)
- Kaiser Chiefs – South Africa, South America (except Colombia), England (only Sunderland), Ireland
- Los Mox! – Chile
- Mighty Mighty Bosstones – North America (Boston July 18, 2015)
- Mission of Burma – North America (Boston July 18, 2015)
- Naked Raygun – North America (selected dates)
- Raimundos – Brazil (except Porto Alegre)
- Rise Against – Oceania
- Royal Blood – North America (selected dates), Scotland (Edinburgh and Milton Keynes)
- The Strypes – England (only Sunderland), Ireland
- Teenage Fanclub – England (only Manchester)
- Trombone Shorty – Europe (selected dates)

== Songs performed ==
Complete

Foo Fighters

- "Alone + Easy Target"
- "Big Me"
- "For All The Cows"
- "Exhausted"
- "I'll Stick Around"
- "This Is a Call"
- "Wattershed"
- "Weenie Beenie"

The Colour and the Shape

- "Enough Space"
- "Everlong"
- "Hey, Johnny Park!"
- "Monkey Wrench"
- "My Hero"
- "New Way Home"
- "Up in Arms"
- "Wind Up"

There Is Nothing Left to Lose

- "Aurora"
- "Breakout"
- "Generator"
- "Learn to Fly"

One by One

- "All My Life"
- "Have It All"
- "Low"
- "Times Like These"

In Your Honor

- "Best of You"
- "Cold Day in the Sun"
- "DOA"

Echoes, Silence, Patience & Grace

- "But, Honestly"
- "Long Road to Ruin"
- "The Pretender"

Greatest Hits

- "Wheels"

Wasting Light

- "Arlandria"
- "Dear Rosemary"
- "Rope"
- "These Days"
- "Walk"
- "White Limo"

Sonic Highways

- "Congregation"
- "The Feast and the Famine"
- "I Am River"
- "In the Clear"
- "Outside"
- "Something from Nothing"
- "Subterranean"
- "What Did I Do? / God As My Witness"

Other (non-album songs)

- "Skin and Bones"

Covers

- "Ain't Talkin' 'bout Love" (Van Halen)
- "Breakdown" (Tom Petty and the Heartbreakers)
- "Bad Moon Rising" (Creedence Clearwater Revival)
- "Been Caught Stealing" (Jane's Addiction)
- "Cinnamon Girl" (Neil Young)
- "Detroit Rock City" (KISS)
- "Gold Dust Woman" (Fleetwood Mac)
- "Had a Dad" (Jane's Addiction)
- "How Low Can a Punk Get" (Bad Brains)
- "In The Flesh?" (Pink Floyd)
- "Jailbreak" (Thin Lizzy)
- "Let There Be Rock" (AC/DC)
- "Miss You" (The Rolling Stones)
- "Molly's Lips" (The Vaselines)
- "Next to You" (The Police)
- "The Regulator" (Bad Brains)
- "School's Out" (Alice Cooper)
- "Seven Nation Army" (The White Stripes)
- "Stay with Me (The Faces)
- "Stiff Competition" (Cheap Trick)
- "Stop Draggin' My Heart Around" (Stevie Nicks)
- "Summer of '69" (Bryan Adams)
- "Tie Your Mother Down" (Queen)
- "Tom Sawyer" (Rush)
- "Under Pressure" (Queen and David Bowie)
- "Whole Lotta Love" (Led Zeppelin)
- "Young Man Blues" (Mose Allison)

Non-complete (played during jams, intros and band introductions)

Might be incomplete.

Covers

- "2112" (Rush)
- "Another One Bites the Dust" (Queen)
- "Blackbird" (The Beatles)
- "Blitzkrieg Bop" (Ramones)
- "Carry On Wayward Son" (Kansas)
- "Daft Punk Is Playing at My House" (LCD Soundsystem)
- "Diary of a Madman" (Ozzy Osbourne)
- "Double Vision" (Foreigner)
- "Eruption" (Van Halen)
- "Everybody Wants Some!!" (Van Halen)
- "Frankenstein (The Edgar Winter Group)
- "Fly by Night" (Rush)
- "Footloose" (Kenny Loggins)
- "Green Onions" (Booker T. & the M.G.'s)
- "God Save the Queen" (Sex Pistols)
- "Happy Birthday" (Stevie Wonder)
- "Heart of the Sunrise" (Yes)
- "I'm the One" (Van Halen)
- "In a Big Country" (Big Country)
- "I Wanna Be Your Dog (The Stooges)

- "Let's Go" (The Cars)
- "Limelight" (Rush)
- "Low Rider" (War)
- "Mountain Song" (Jane's Addiction)
- "MTV Theme Song"
- "No Fun" (The Stooges)
- "One Vision" (Queen)
- "Owner of a Lonely Heart" (Yes)
- "Panama" (Van Halen)
- "Radio Ga Ga" (Queen)
- "Roundabout" (Yes)
- "Search and Destroy" (The Stooges)
- "Smoke on the Water" (Deep Purple)
- "The Spirit of Radio" (Rush)
- "Stairway to Heaven" (Led Zeppelin)
- "Unchained" (Van Halen)
- "War Pigs" (Black Sabbath)
- "Wrathchild" (Iron Maiden)
- "You Really Got Me" (The Kinks)
- "Ziggy Stardust" (David Bowie)

== Tour dates ==
List of concerts, showing date, city, country, venue, tickets sold, attendance, and gross revenue
Date	City	Country	Venue	Attendance	Revenue
Africa
December 10, 2014	Cape Town	South Africa	Cape Town Stadium	26,392 / 36,367	$1,517,770
December 13, 2014	Johannesburg	South Africa	FNB Stadium	46,585 / 59,873	$2,641,690
South America
January 15, 2015 (Note: The concert on 15 January 2015 was originally scheduled to take place in the main field of the Estadio Nacional, but it was moved to the Athletic track for logistic reasons.)	Santiago	Chile	Pista Atletica Estadio Nacional	20,939 / 24,918	$1,280,750
January 18, 2015	La Plata	Argentina	Estadio Ciudad de La Plata	32,241 / 37,888	$2,388,040
January 21, 2015	Porto Alegre	Brazil	Estacionamento FIERGS	31,471 / 31,471	$2,868,020
January 23, 2015	São Paulo	Brazil	Estádio do Morumbi	66,958 / 66,958	$5,210,300
January 25, 2015	Rio de Janeiro	Brazil	Maracanã Stadium	47,992 / 55,265	$3,604,000
January 28, 2015	Belo Horizonte	Brazil	Esplanada do Mineirão	17,014 / 24,000	$1,268,100
January 31, 2015	Bogotá	Colombia	Estadio El Campín	36,883 / 41,683	$3,165,344
Oceania
February 18, 2015	Christchurch	New Zealand	AMI Stadium	27,000	—
February 21, 2015	Auckland	New Zealand	Mount Smart Stadium	35,000	—
February 24, 2015	Brisbane	Australia	Suncorp Stadium	39,448 / 40,000	$4,015,380
February 26, 2015	Sydney	Australia	ANZ Stadium	51,131 / 55,000	$4,960,000
February 28, 2015	Melbourne	Australia	Docklands Stadium	56,981 / 56,981	$5,479,510
March 2, 2015	Hobart	Australia	Derwent Entertainment Centre	6,505 / 6,505	$659,878
March 4, 2015	Adelaide	Australia	Hindmarsh Stadium	21,605 / 23,000	$2,269,560
March 8, 2015	Perth	Australia	Nib Stadium	31,101 / 31,262	$3,174,630
North America
May 15, 2015 (Note: The concert on May 15, 2015 at The Hangout in Gulf Shores is part of the Hangout Music Festival.)	Gulf Shores	United States	The Hangout	40,000	—
Europe
May 24, 2015	Norwich	England	Earlham Park	50,000	
May 25, 2015	Sunderland	England	Stadium of Light	40,000	
May 27, 2015	Manchester	England	Old Trafford Cricket Ground	50,000	
May 30, 2015	Slane	Ireland	Slane Castle	59,858 / 60,000	$4,908,548
June 3, 2015	Hamburg	Germany	Barclaycard Arena	11,429 / 11,429	$738,172
June 5, 2015 (Note: The concert on June 5, 2015 at Zeppelinfeld in Nuremberg is part of the Rock im Park.)	Nuremberg	Germany	Zeppelinfeld	75,000 / 75,000	$12,862,772
June 7, 2015 (Note: The concert on June 7, 2015 at Flugplatz Mendig in Mendig is part of the Rock am Ring.)	Mendig	Germany	Flugplatz Mendig	90,000 / 90,000	—
June 10, 2015	Oslo	Norway	Telenor Arena	22,000	—
June 12, 2015	Gothenburg	Sweden	Ullevi	52,000	—
North America
July 4, 2015 (Note: The concert on July 4, 2015 at RFK Memorial Stadium in Washington, D.C. is part of the Foo Fighters' 20th Anniversary Blowout.)	Washington, D.C.	United States	RFK Memorial Stadium	48,000	—
July 6, 2015	Camden	United States	Susquehanna Bank Center	—	—
July 8, 2015	Toronto	Canada	Molson Canadian Amphitheatre	—	—
July 9, 2015	Toronto	Canada	Molson Canadian Amphitheatre	—	—
July 11, 2015 (Note: The concert on July 11, 2015 at Plains of Abraham in Quebec is part of the Festival d'été de Québec. This concert was stopped after 4 songs due to thunderstorm.)	Quebec	Canada	Plains of Abraham	—	—
July 13, 2015	Camden	United States	Susquehanna Bank Center	—	—
July 15, 2015	New York City	United States	Citi Field	67,525 / 82,392	$4,611,456
July 16, 2015	New York City	United States	Citi Field	67,525 / 82,392	$4,611,456
July 18, 2015	Boston	United States	Fenway Park	68,205 / 68,205	$4,242,491
July 19, 2015	Boston	United States	Fenway Park	68,205 / 68,205	$4,242,491
Asia
July 24, 2015 (Note: The concert on July 24, 2015 at Naeba Ski Resort in Niigata is part of the Fuji Rock Festival.)	Niigata	Japan	Naeba Ski Resort	—	—
July 25, 2015 (Note: The concert on July 25, 2015 at Daebu Sea Breeze Theme Park in Ansan is part of the Jisan Valley Rock Festival.)	Ansan	South Korea	Daebu Sea Breeze Theme Park	—	—
North America
August 12, 2015	Edmonton	Canada	Rexall Place	—	—
August 13, 2015	Calgary	Canada	Scotiabank Saddledome	—	—
August 14, 2015 (Note: The concert on August 14, 2015 at Whitman College Athletic Fields in Walla Walla is part of the Gentleman of the Road Stopover.)	Walla Walla	United States	Whitman College Athletic Fields	—	—
August 16, 2015	Greenwood Village	United States	Fiddler's Green Amphitheatre	—	—
August 17, 2015	Greenwood Village	United States	Fiddler's Green Amphitheatre	—	—
August 19, 2015	Maryland Heights	United States	Hollywood Casino Amphitheatre	—	—
August 21, 2015	Kansas City	United States	Sprint Center	—	—
August 22, 2015	Saint Paul	United States	Xcel Energy Center	13,744 / 13,744	$911,920
August 24, 2015	Clarkston	United States	DTE Energy Music Theatre	—	—
August 25, 2015	Burgettstown	United States	First Niagara Pavilion	—	—
August 27, 2015	Noblesville	United States	Klipsch Music Center	—	—
August 29, 2015	Chicago	United States	Wrigley Field	40,788 / 40,788	$2,501,510
Europe
September 5, 2015	Milton Keynes	England	National Bowl	—	—
September 6, 2015	Milton Keynes	England	National Bowl	—	—
September 8, 2015	Edinburgh	Scotland	Murrayfield Stadium	—	—
North America
September 11, 2015	Vancouver	Canada	Rogers Arena	—	—
September 12, 2015	George	United States	The Gorge	—	—
September 14, 2015	Portland	United States	Moda Center	—	—
September 16, 2015	Mountain View	United States	Shoreline Amphitheatre	—	—
September 18, 2015	Anaheim	United States	Honda Center	—	—
September 19, 2015	Anaheim	United States	Honda Center	—	—
September 21, 2015	Inglewood	United States	The Forum	26,443 / 26,443	$1,553,685
September 22, 2015	Inglewood	United States	The Forum	26,443 / 26,443	$1,553,685
September 24, 2015	Chula Vista	United States	Sleep Train Amphitheatre	—	—
September 25, 2015	Phoenix	United States	Ak-Chin Pavilion	—	—
September 27, 2015	Albuquerque	United States	Isleta Amphitheater	—	—
September 29, 2015	Oklahoma City	United States	Chesapeake Energy Arena	—	—
September 30, 2015	Wichita	United States	Intrust Bank Arena	—	—
October 2, 2015 (Note: The concert on October 2, 2015 at Zilker Park in Austin, Texas is part of the Austin City Limits Music Festival.)	Austin	United States	Zilker Park	—	—
October 4, 2015	Atlanta	United States	Centennial Olympic Park	—	—
October 5, 2015	Nashville	United States	Bridgestone Arena	—	—
October 7, 2015	Memphis	United States	FedExForum	—	—
October 9, 2015 (Note: The concert on October 9, 2015 at Zilker Park in Austin, Texas is part of the Austin City Limits Music Festival.)	Austin	United States	Zilker Park	—	—
October 17, 2015	Anaheim	United States	Honda Center	—	—
October 18, 2015 (Note: The concert on October 18, 2015 at Castaic Lake in Castaic, California is part of the Love Ride.)	Castaic	United States	Castaic Lake	—	—
Europe
November 3, 2015	Cesena	Italy	Carisport	—	—
November 5, 2015	Amsterdam	Netherlands	Ziggo Dome	—	—
November 6, 2015	Cologne	Germany	Lanxess Arena	—	—
November 8, 2015	Berlin	Germany	Mercedes-Benz Arena	13,811 / 13,811	$880,562
November 9, 2015	Kraków	Poland	Tauron Arena Kraków	—	—
November 11, 2015	Vienna	Austria	Wiener Stadthalle	15,800 / 15,800	—
November 13, 2015	Bologna	Italy	Unipol Arena	—	—
Total				774,319/ 832,386	$68,860,141

=== Cancelled shows ===
List of cancelled concerts, showing date, city, country and venue
Date	City	Country	Venue	Reason
June 14, 2015 (Note: The concert on June 14, 2015 at Megaland Park in Landgraaf would have been part of the Pinkpop Festival.)	Landgraaf	Netherlands	Megaland Park	Dave Grohl's injury, following his falling off the stage at the concert in Sweden (June 12, 2015)
June 16, 2015	St. Gallen	Switzerland	AFG Arena	Dave Grohl's injury, following his falling off the stage at the concert in Sweden (June 12, 2015)
June 19, 2015	London	England	Wembley Stadium	Dave Grohl's injury, following his falling off the stage at the concert in Sweden (June 12, 2015)
June 20, 2015	London	England	Wembley Stadium	Dave Grohl's injury, following his falling off the stage at the concert in Sweden (June 12, 2015)
June 23, 2015	Edinburgh	Scotland	Murrayfield Stadium	Dave Grohl's injury, following his falling off the stage at the concert in Sweden (June 12, 2015)
June 25, 2015 (Note: The concert on June 25, 2015 at Werchterpark in Werchter would have been part of the Rock Werchter.)	Werchter	Belgium	Werchterpark	Dave Grohl's injury, following his falling off the stage at the concert in Sweden (June 12, 2015)
June 26, 2015 (Note: The concert on June 26, 2015 at Worthy Farm in Pilton, Somerset would have been part of the Glastonbury Festival.)	Pilton	England	Worthy Farm	Dave Grohl's injury, following his falling off the stage at the concert in Sweden (June 12, 2015)
November 14, 2015	Turin	Italy	Palaolimpico	November 2015 Paris terrorist attacks
November 16, 2015	Paris	France	Bercy Arena	November 2015 Paris terrorist attacks
November 17, 2015	Lyon	France	Halle Tony Garnier	November 2015 Paris terrorist attacks
November 19, 2015	Barcelona	Spain	Palau Sant Jordi	November 2015 Paris terrorist attacks

== Personnel ==
Foo Fighters

- Dave Grohl – lead vocals, backing vocals, rhythm guitar, lead guitar, drums
- Pat Smear – rhythm guitar
- Nate Mendel – bass
- Taylor Hawkins – drums, backing vocals, lead vocals
- Chris Shiflett – lead guitar, rhythm guitar, backing vocals

Additional musicians

- Rami Jaffee – keyboards, mellotron, accordion
