= RDGLDGRN =

American indie rock band

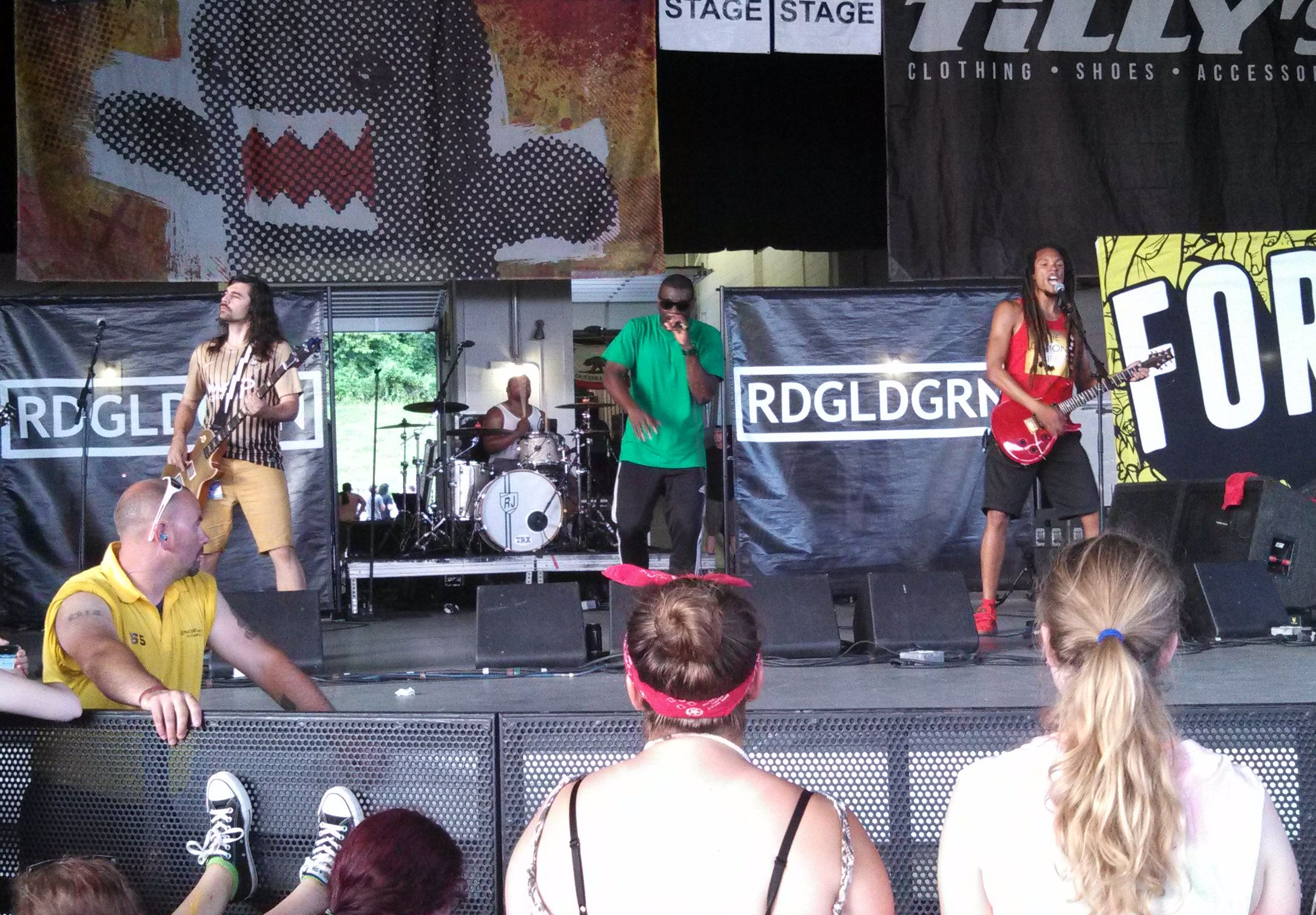
- RDGLDGRN performing in 2013

Background information
- Origin: Reston, Virginia, U.S.
- Genres: Alternative hip hop; go-go; alternative rock; rap rock; indie rock; reggae; pop
- Years active: 2011–present
- Label: Deuce Day World
- Members: Red; Gold; Green; Snaxx
- Website: rdgldgrn.com

RDGLDGRN (disemvoweling of Red Gold Green) is an American band based out of Reston, Virginia. Formed in 2011, the band recorded their debut album featuring Dave Grohl (Foo Fighters, Nirvana) on drums at Sound City Studios in 2012 with producer Kevin Augunas and engineer Clif Norrell. They have worked with a wide range of notable musicians, including Dave Grohl, Pharrell Williams, and Nick Hexum of 311, and been featured on NPR Music's Tiny Desk, NME, Rolling Stone, HBO and Billboard. RDGLDGRN released their debut self-titled full-length album in September 2013. Since 2013, RDGLDGRN has toured across North America, Europe, Australia, and aboard the 311 Caribbean Cruise in 2015, 2017, 2019, and 2025. Their music has been featured in multiple video game soundtracks, including Need for Speed Rivals, EA Sports UFC, and Madden NFL.

== History ==
=== 2011–2015, Debut Album & Exposure on a Global Stage ===
Band members Marcus Parham (Red), Andrei Busuioceanu (Gold) and Pierre Desrosiers (Green) met through mutual friends in Reston, Virginia. In the fall of 2011, RDGLDGRN recorded their breakout song "I Love Lamp", and uploaded their self-produced and directed music video to YouTube, where it reached over 100,000 hits within days. In the spring of 2012, RDGLDGRN recorded their debut album at Sound City Studios with Kevin Augunas (The Lumineers, Edward Sharpe and the Magnetic Zeroes), producer and founder of Fairfax Recordings. The group asked fellow Northern Virginia native Dave Grohl, who was filming his Sound City documentary, to drum on "I Love Lamp." Grohl agreed and played drums for the entire record, with the exception of "Million Fans," which features a sampled breakbeat. An additional Virginia native became involved when Pharrell Williams co-wrote and co-produced "Doing the Most."

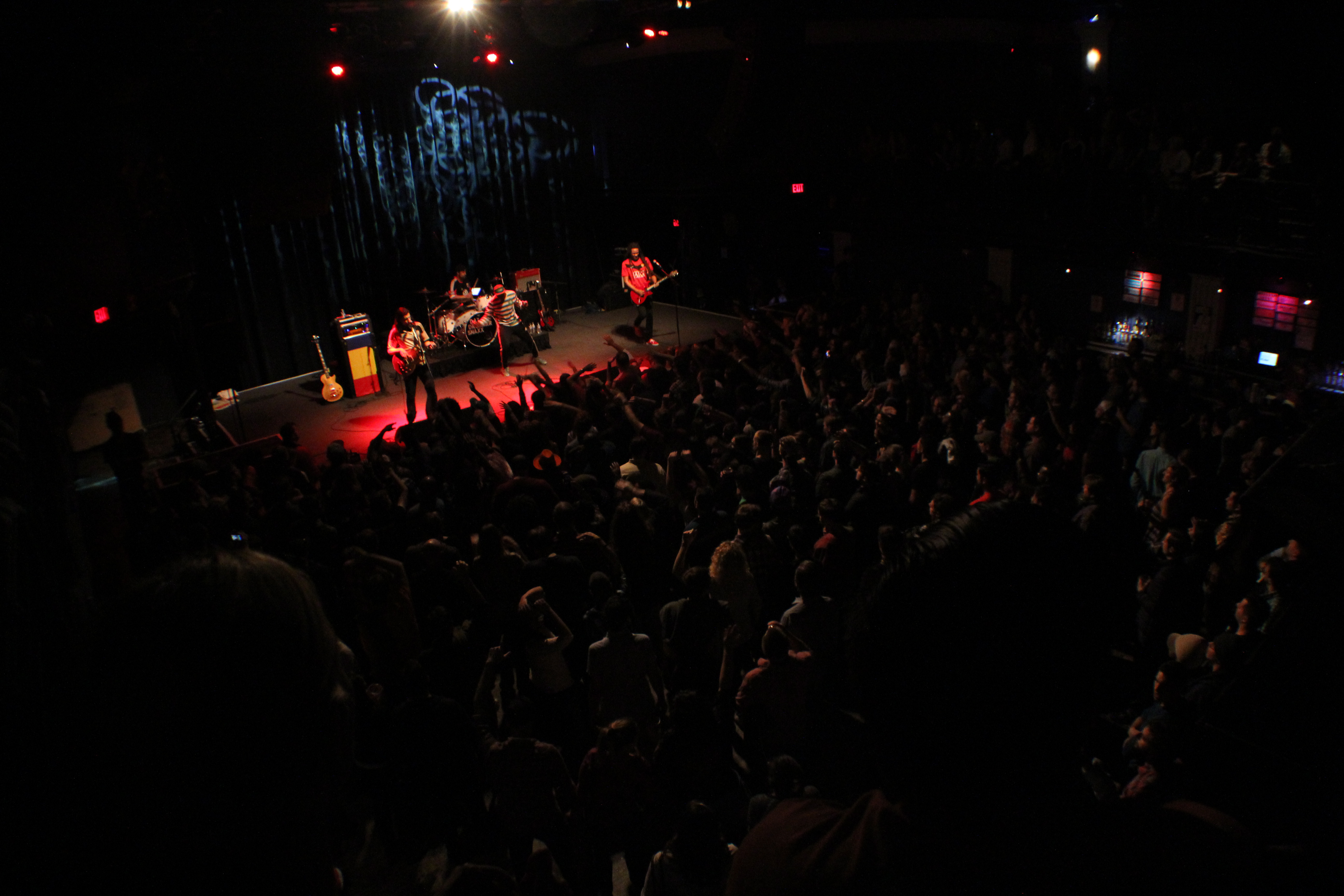
RDGLDGRN headlining the 9:30 Club in Washington, DC in October 2014

In June 2012, the demo recording of "I Love Lamp" was used as the theme song for the world record Hot Wheels Double Loop Dare at the 2012 X Games in Los Angeles, California. In January 2013, British magazine NME released "Million Fans." Days later, Rolling Stone released "I Love Lamp" with Dave Grohl on drums. The Red Gold Green EP was debuted February 12, 2013 and reached the top 100 on the American iTunes album chart. RDGLDGRN made their television debut on Jimmy Kimmel Live! in March 2013 performing both "I Love Lamp" and "Million Fans." RDGLDGRN performed at SXSW in March 2013, the DC101 Chili Cook-Off in May 2013, and the Vans Warped Tour 2013. RDGLDGRN released their debut self-titled full-length album in September 2013.

On October 24, 2014, RDGLDGRN was featured in the Washington, DC episode of Dave Grohl's HBO documentary series Foo Fighters: Sonic Highways. This episode premiered the second song off the Foo Fighters' Sonic Highways album "The Feast and the Famine," which showcases the bounce beat as played by Grohl in RDGLDGRN's "I Love Lamp."

RDGLDGRN spent most of 2015 on tour, with performances across North America and Europe. In February 2015, the band played their first 311 Caribbean Cruise alongside 311 and Dirty Heads. The Source released the music video for RDGLDGRN's new single "No Pixar". In July 2015, RDGLDGRN opened the Foo Fighters 20th Anniversary concert in Washington, D.C., followed by multiple performances with Jurassic 5. In August 2015, RDGLDGRN released the self-produced music video for “Runnin Away,” featuring footage from live shows at U Street Music Hall and RFK Stadium. The band toured across Germany, Switzerland and Luxembourg, playing shows and festivals (including Taubertal Festival, Rocco del Schlacko, Serengeti Festival, and Reeperbahn Festival) and appearing on numerous radio and television shows, including Circus HalliGalli, Das Erste, RTL 2 and Sky Sports. RDGLDGRN’s second album "Red Gold Green LP 2" was released on October 9, 2015 through Virgin Records in Germany and self-published elsewhere. RDGLDGRN completed the year with their December 2015 “Robots Tour” alongside Duckwrth in the United States and Canada.

=== 2016–2019, Independent Label ===
By 2016 RDGLDGRN had officially severed ties with mainstream record labels in favor of releasing music under their own independent label Deuce Day Records. Their song “Runnin Away” was featured in EA Sports UFC 2. In 2016, RDGLDGRN performed at SXSW, multiple North American tours with Dirty Heads, New Beat Fund, and the Skints, and performances with 311 and Ballyhoo!. They also returned to Germany in June 2016 to perform in the Campus Festival Bielefeld. RDGLDGRN recorded an NPR Music Tiny Desk Concert in September 2016. RDGLDGRN’s gear was stolen while on tour in Medford, Oregon in November 2016, prompting fans to raise over $19,000 on GoFundMe.

In January 2017, RDGLDGRN released the single “Opera” featuring Method Man. RDGLDGRN performed live shows for most of 2017, including their second 311 Caribbean Cruise, the ARISE Music Festival, the California Roots Festival, the “Blackout 2017 Tour” with the Expendables, a summer tour with Dirty Heads, SOJA, and the Green, and finally an October tour with Lettuce. RDGLDGRN also performed twice at Red Rocks Amphitheatre, including the 420 Eve Show with Method Man and Redman. RDGLDGRN released the “Red Gold Green Radio Vol. 1” album in September 2017 under their label Deuce Day Records.

In January 2018, RDGLDGRN's single “Danger” featuring Nitty Scott was featured in EA Sports UFC 3. RDGLDGRN performed across the United States and Germany in 2018, including the Reggae Rise Up Festival, Nextival, Trebur Open Air Festival, Watt en Schlick, and Lott-Festival. RDGLDGRN released "Clapback" in October 2018.

In February 2019, RDGLDGRN released the “Red Gold Green 3” album under Deuce Day World, completing their first album trilogy. RDGLDGRN spent the majority of 2019 touring the United States, including the RDGLDGRN Amazing Tour, Shamrock Fest, Hangout Music Festival, a fall tour with Hirie, and performances with 311, Dirty Heads, and Tropidelic. RDGLDGRN also played their third 311 Caribbean Cruise. In April 2019, RDGLDGRN recorded a TED Talk with TEDxBethesda. RDGLDGRN released several singles in 2019, including “Tradition,” “People Don’t Dance,” “Bayou,” and “Turn.”

=== 2020–2024: Covid Hiatus ===
On January 29, 2020, RDGLDGRN announced their first headline tour in the United States, the Spring 2020 "Danger Tour" named after their previously released single "Danger," which would be featured on Madden NFL 21. On March 12, 2020, RDGLDGRN postponed the tour, citing safety concerns due to the global coronavirus pandemic. RDGLDGRN would instead livestream a performance on Facebook Live on March 20, 2020. The pandemic would go on to embody the lyrics for the “Everybody Livin In a Trap” single released in August 2020. In July 2020, RDGLDGRN debuted “Good Life” featuring Vanela, which was previously released late 2019 in Simlish on the Sims 4.

The next few years would be markedly quiet for RDGLDGRN with minimal new releases and live shows. In 2021 RDGLDGRN performed at Firefly Music Festival, the Down in the Reeds Festival (at the Parks at Walter Reed), D.C. United's Unite the District Festival, and a short tour. In 2022 as RDGLDGRN began to develop new music, RDGLDGN played a May tour culminating in the 2022 LIVEstock Music Festival and Brew in the Zoo at the Maryland Zoo. RDGLDGRN also performed at the South by South End Music Festival in June 2022. Their August 2023 single "Heads are Gonna Roll" with Madalen Duke was featured in Madden NFL 24. On November 10, 2023, RDGLDGRN performed a hometown “10th Anniversary show” in Washington, DC to mark the ten year anniversary of their debut album.

The Washington, D.C. go-go beat again inspired a collaboration between RDGLDGRN and Pharrell on single "Feel It Right Now," which was released in August 2024. Both "Feel It Right Now" and "Bounce" would later be featured in Madden NFL 25. RDGLDGRN continued playing festivals in 2024, including the National Cannabis Festival with headliners Wu-Tang Clan (Washington, D.C.), Point Break Festival (Virginia Beach, VA), and the 2024 Beaches Oktoberfest (Jacksonville Beach, FL). RDGLDGRN also toured with Tropidelic and The Quasi Kings in October 2024.

=== 2025–Present: Revival ===
RDGLDGRN revealed its second album trilogy in 2025 with the self-published release of "The Red Album" in February 2025. RDGLDGRN played their fourth 311 Caribbean Cruise in March 2025.

In August 2025, RDGLDGRN released "Stay With Me" featuring Little Stranger, the first single off their new album with Ineffable Records. This album would expand their repertoire to include reggae and include additional collaborations with Nick Hexum of 311, Surfer Girl, Jarv, Kash'd Out, Ballyhoo!, and The Ries Brothers. "The Gold Album" was released in March 2026 and reached 1,000,000 streams on Spotify within 7 days. Billboard featured "I've Been Missing" on their March 2026 "Caribbean Fresh Picks of the Month" Spotify playlist.

RDGLDGRN played a nationwide U.S. tour with Jarv and Damn Skippy in Spring 2026, followed by summer performances at Warped Tour Washington, D.C. and High Hopes Festival, an annual festival hosted by Bumpin Uglies. The band opened for Dirty Heads at Red Rocks Amphitheatre and Dillon Amphitheater in Summer 2026.

In June 2026 the Reston Museum, a nonprofit organization in the band's hometown, showcased RDGLDGRN's history as part of their "Famous Restonians" exhibit alongside Grant Hill and Benny Blanco. RDGLDGRN headlined their hometown landmark Reston Town Center on June 27, 2026.

RDGLDGRN is currently working on "The Green Album," the final album of the "Color" trilogy. The first single released off the new album, "Gimme Some Love" with The Movement and Vanela, is featured on EA Sports Madden NFL 27.

== Musical style ==
Indie go-go is a combination of indie rock and a syncopated Washington, DC rhythm known as go-go.

RDGLDGRN - I Love Lamp

Press descriptions of the music:

"Listen and you'll hear a striking mix of rock, hip-hop, funk, go-go and international sounds, fused with energy and humor."

— Suraya Mohamed, NPR Tiny Desk

"Their music is an ambitious mixture of breezy island rhythms, garage rock and go-go — the homegrown sound of nearby Washington, D.C."

"[RDGLDGRN] fus[es] breezy indie rock with pop-leaning hooks and hip-hop breakdowns."

The band's sound has also been described as alternative hip hop go-go, alternative rock, hip hop, rap rock, indie rock, pop, garage rock, and reggae. The band has cited musical influences from many different genres, including The Beatles, Bob Marley, Outkast, Vampire Weekend, and Chuck Brown.

== Band members ==
Current members:

- Red (Marcus Parham) – guitar (2011–present)
- Gold (Andrei Busuioceanu) – bass (2011–present)
- Green (Pierre Desrosiers) – vocals (2011–present)
- Snaxx (Adam Orlando) – drums (2014–present)

Past member:

- Arejay (Reginold James) - drums (2012-2013)

== Discography ==
RDGLDGRN's discography is loosely organized in two trilogies: the "Red Gold Green" Trilogy and the "Color" Trilogy.

- "Red Gold Green" Trilogy
  - Red Gold Green LP (2013)
  - Red Gold Green LP 2 (2015)
  - Red Gold Green 3 (2019)
- "Color" Trilogy
  - The Red Album (2025)
  - The Gold Album (2026)
  - The Green Album (in work)

RDGLDGRN has released multiple additional albums, including

- Red Gold Green Radio (2017)
- Red Gold Green Live (2020)

=== "Red Gold Green" Trilogy ===
==== Red Gold Green (2013) ====
All tracks are written by Andrei Busuioceanu, Pierre Desrosiers, and Marcus Parham. Additional co-writers on "Doing the Most" are Kevin Augunas and Pharrell Williams. All songs except "Million Fans" feature Dave Grohl on drums.

| No. | Title | Length |
|---|---|---|
| 1. | "I Love Lamp" | 2:39 |
| 2. | "Doing The Most" | 3:19 |
| 3. | "Power Ups" | 3:07 |
| 4. | "Million Fans" | 3:56 |
| 5. | "Lootin in London (feat. Angel Haze)" | 3:05 |
| 6. | "All I Got Is Now" | 2:26 |
| 7. | "Bang Bang" | 3:09 |
| 8. | "Hey O" | 3:16 |
| 9. | "Stranger" | 3:07 |
| 10. | "Double Dutch" | 3:07 |
| 11. | "Build a Home" | 2:59 |
| 12. | "Good Morning" | 3:35 |
| 13. | "Well Hello" | 2:28 |
| Total length: | | 40:15 |

==== Red Gold Green LP 2 (2015) ====
All tracks are written by Andrei Busuioceanu, Pierre Desrosiers, Marcus Parham.

| No. | Title | Length |
|---|---|---|
| 1. | "No Pixar" | 3:44 |
| 2. | "Chop U Down" | 3:35 |
| 3. | "Doing The Most" | 3:19 |
| 4. | "Hangout" | 4:34 |
| 5. | "When I'm Alone" | 5:08 |
| 6. | "Runnin Away" | 3:07 |
| 7. | "Trouble Punk" | 4:37 |
| 8. | "Turn" | 3:24 |
| 9. | "Spiderman" | 4:41 |
| 10. | "Elevators" | 3:21 |
| 11. | "Won't Last" | 4:10 |
| Total length: | | 42:54 |

==== Red Gold Green 3 (2019) ====
All tracks are written by Andrei Busuioceanu, Pierre Desrosiers, Marcus Parham.

| No. | Title | Length |
|---|---|---|
| 1. | "Clapback" | 2:28 |
| 2. | "See Me Then" | 2:34 |
| 3. | "Reckless" | 3:14 |
| 4. | "Tradition" | 3:05 |
| 5. | "Karnival" | 3:00 |
| 6. | "Amazing" | 3:33 |
| 7. | "Monica" | 4:02 |
| 8. | "Not My Girlfriend" | 3:38 |
| 9. | "Load It Up" | 3:29 |
| 10. | "Energy" | 3:22 |
| 11. | "Wrote This Song" | 3:18 |
| Total length: | | 35:42 |

=== "Color" Trilogy ===
==== The Red Album (2025) ====
| No. | Title | Length |
|---|---|---|
| 1. | "Marvel vs Capcom" | 1:56 |
| 2. | "Feel It Right Now" (produced by Pharrell) | 2:15 |
| 3. | "Heads Are Gonna Roll" (with Madalen Duke) | 2:06 |
| 4. | "Pew" | 2:14 |
| 5. | "That's A Bet" | 2:12 |
| 6. | "Bounce" | 2:33 |
| 7. | "Everybody Living In A Trap" | 3:29 |
| 8. | "Bayou" | 4:04 |
| 9. | "Voila" | 2:40 |
| 10. | "Waiting For Her Again" | 3:10 |
| 11. | "Damn" | 2:51 |
| 12. | "Okay" | 3:07 |
| Total length: | | 32:43 |

==== The Gold Album (2026) ====
| No. | Title | Length |
|---|---|---|
| 1. | "Prologue" |
| 2. | "Virginia Beach" (with Surfer Girl) | 3:32 |
| 3. | "Voiceover" |
| 4. | "Stay With Me" (with Little Stranger) | 2:52 |
| 5. | "Feeling Level" |
| 6. | "Sunshine" |
| 7. | "Sugarcane" (with JARV) | 3:12 |
| 8. | "X Games" (with KAsh'd Out) | 3:26 |
| 9. | "Going Up" (with Ballyhoo!) | 3:03 |
| 10. | "Tony Hawk" |
| 11. | "Cola" (with Ries Brothers) |
| 12. | "Lifetime Luxury" |
| 13. | "I've Been Missing" (with Nick Hexum) |
| 14. | "Can't Stop Me" | 3:21 |

=== Additional Albums and Singles ===
==== Red Gold Green Radio (2017) ====
All tracks are written by Andrei Busuioceanu, Pierre Desrosiers, Marcus Parham.

| No. | Title | Length |
|---|---|---|
| 1. | "Radio Intro" | 0:32 |
| 2. | "Run Wit Me" | 2:37 |
| 3. | "Simple" | 2:11 |
| 4. | "Where I Be At" | 2:19 |
| 5. | "Mad as F*Ck / Crisp n Dank" | 3:59 |
| 6. | "The Moon" | 2:04 |
| 7. | "Fridge / Loafin" | 3:42 |
| 8. | "No Supply" | 2:29 |
| 9. | "Reckless" | 3:10 |
| 10. | "Ocd" | 1:49 |
| 11. | "Fleur De Lis" | 2:37 |
| 12. | "Brand New" | 3:03 |
| Total length: | | 30:36 |

==== Red Gold Green Live (2020) ====
All tracks are written by Andrei Busuioceanu, Pierre Desrosiers, Marcus Parham.

| No. | Title | Length |
|---|---|---|
| 1. | "Runnin Away (Live)" | 3:08 |
| 2. | "Amazing (Live)" | 2:42 |
| 3. | "Bayou (Live)" | 4:03 |
| 4. | "Not My Girlfriend (Live)" | 3:40 |
| 5. | "Tradition (Live)" | 3:07 |
| 6. | "People Don't Dance (Live)" | 3:11 |
| 7. | "No Pixar (Live)" | 3:24 |
| 8. | "Lamp (Live)" | 2:43 |
| 9. | "Doin The Most (Live)" | 3:21 |
| 10. | "Karnival (Live)" | 3:01 |
| 11. | "Danger (Live)" | 2:39 |
| 12. | "Clapback (Live)" | 2:26 |
| 13. | "Reckless (Live)" | 2:57 |
| 14. | "Million Fans (Live)" | 4:00 |
| 15. | "Opera (Live)" | 2:39 |
| Total length: | | 30:36 |

== Features in Video Games, Television and Film ==
RDGLDGRN made their primetime television debut on Jimmy Kimmel Live! on March 20, 2013, playing both "Million Fans" and "I Love Lamp" from their first album. The band has since been featured in many video games and television shows, including

- Need for Speed Rivals (2013)
- Foo Fighters: Sonic Highways (Episode 2, 2014)
- EA Sports UFC 2 (2016), EA Sports UFC 3 (2018)
- The Hills: New Beginnings (Season 1 Episode 2, 2019)
- Hard Knocks - Training Camp with the Oakland Raiders (Episode 2, 2019)
- The Sims 4 (Patch 0.88, 2019)
- The Wrong Missy (2020)
- The Rookie (Season 5 Episode 13, 2021)
- EA Sports Madden NFL 21 (2020), Madden NFL 24 (2023), Madden NFL 25 (2024), Madden NFL 26 (2025), and Madden NFL 27 (2026)
- The Recruit (Season 1 Episode 6, 2022)
