= Outside (Foo Fighters song) =

Single by Foo Fighters

from the album Sonic Highways
- Released: August 4, 2015
- Studio: Rancho De La Luna, Joshua Tree, California
- Genre: Alternative rock; post-grunge
- Length: 5:15
- Label: RCA
- Songwriters: Dave Grohl; Taylor Hawkins; Nate Mendel; Chris Shiflett; Pat Smear
- Producers: Butch Vig; Foo Fighters

Foo Fighters singles chronology
"What Did I Do? / God as My Witness" (2014)	"Outside" (2015)	"I Am a River" (2015)

Music video
- "Outside" on YouTube

"Outside" is a song by American rock band Foo Fighters released in August 2015. It is the fifth official single and third radio single from their eighth studio album, Sonic Highways (2014). The song marked a 30th appearance by the Foo Fighters on Billboard's Alternative Songs chart tying them with Green Day and Red Hot Chili Peppers for third-most appearances.

== Recording ==
The song was recorded at Rancho De La Luna, Joshua Tree, California, and featured in the fifth episode of the band's HBO documentary Foo Fighters: Sonic Highways. It features Joe Walsh as guest guitarist and also Chris Goss. The collaboration with Walsh came about through a mutual friend. He explained to Billboard magazine that: "I know them, my drummer when I play solo, Drew Hester, is a great friend of all of those guys, so I hooked up through him". Foo Fighters' drummer Taylor Hawkins told Q magazine that he thought Walsh's guitar solo on "Outside" was the champagne moment on the Sonic Highways album. Hawkins said that "If you're gonna have Joe Walsh on your album, you're not gonna just give him four bars. You're gonna give him 40 bars and take us out into the f--kin desert man!".

== Release and reception ==
Foo Fighters debuted "Outside" at BBC Radio 1's Maida Vale Studios. The live debut of the song was performed at London's Islington Assembly Hall on 12 September 2014, in which Foo Fighters played an instrumental version during a rendition of their 2007 single "The Pretender".

In a review of the Sonic Highways album, Consequence of Sound stated that "On Sonic Highways, the references to Muddy Waters on "Something from Nothing" or the Bluebird Cafe on the album's best track, "Congregation", are more forced and distracting than inspired. Other lyrics are worse, like "beautiful earthling, blessed in cashmere" on the L.A. song, "Outside". That track manages to capture some of the essence of the West Coast city, but the details of "canyons" and "sirens" seem hollow, lack insight, and reek of lyrics that were hammered out on instinct, not careful consideration".

Alternative Nation stated that "Outside sounds like it could have fit in on One by One. The song is about Los Angeles, where it was recorded. Grohl sings, There you are dancing at your altar/beautiful earthling/dressed in kashmir/all of your sound echoes in the canyons/down below they’re dreaming/hear the sirens screaming/another time/another world/girls were boys/and boys were girls/find the glitter/in the litter. There is a breakdown part where Joe Walsh comes in that definitely has a late 70's/early 80's Pink Floyd vibe. "Outside" is one of the weaker tracks on the album, there really aren't any memorable melodies and the lyrics are generic".

On a more positive note, when reviewing the Sonic Highways album and in reference to the fact that each song was recorded in a different city, NME said of the two songs "Outside" and "In the Clear" that "When two of those songs – the meandering ‘Outside’ and the merely-perfunctory ‘In The Clear’ - feel like they're marking time, you find yourself wishing they’d stopped off in Portland, Kansas City, San Francisco or any number of other locales that might’ve resulted in a few more tunes". Loudwire also praised the song stating that "Outside kicks off the latter portion of the disc, with Foo Fighters managing to find the bridge between post-modern ’90s alt-rock and jangly late ’60s California harmonics".

== Live performances ==
"Outside" made its live debut at a promotional show for Sonic Highways. It was a setlist staple on the Sonic Highways tour until the North American leg in September 2015, where it dropped. It has not been played since.

== Personnel ==
Personnel taken from Sonic Highways liner notes.

Foo Fighters

- Dave Grohl – lead vocal & guitar
- Taylor Hawkins – drums, background vocals
- Nate Mendel – bass guitar
- Chris Shiflett – guitar
- Pat Smear – guitar

Additional Performers

- Rami Jaffee – Mellotron, organ
- Joe Walsh – lead guitar
- Chris Goss – background vocals

Production

- Butch Vig – producer
- Foo Fighters – producers
- James Brown – recording engineer, mixing engineer
- Gavin Lurssen – mastering
- Charlie Bolois – studio assistance
- Matthias Schneeberger – studio assistance

== Charts ==
=== Weekly charts ===
Chart (2014–15)	Peak position
Belgium (Ultratip Bubbling Under Flanders)	21
Canada Rock (Billboard)	4
Mexico Ingles Airplay (Billboard)	37
UK Rock & Metal (Official Charts)	10
US Hot Rock & Alternative Songs (Billboard)	35
US Rock & Alternative Airplay (Billboard)	7

=== Year end charts ===
Chart (2015)	Position
US Rock Airplay (Billboard)	47
