= List of songs in Rock Band 4 =

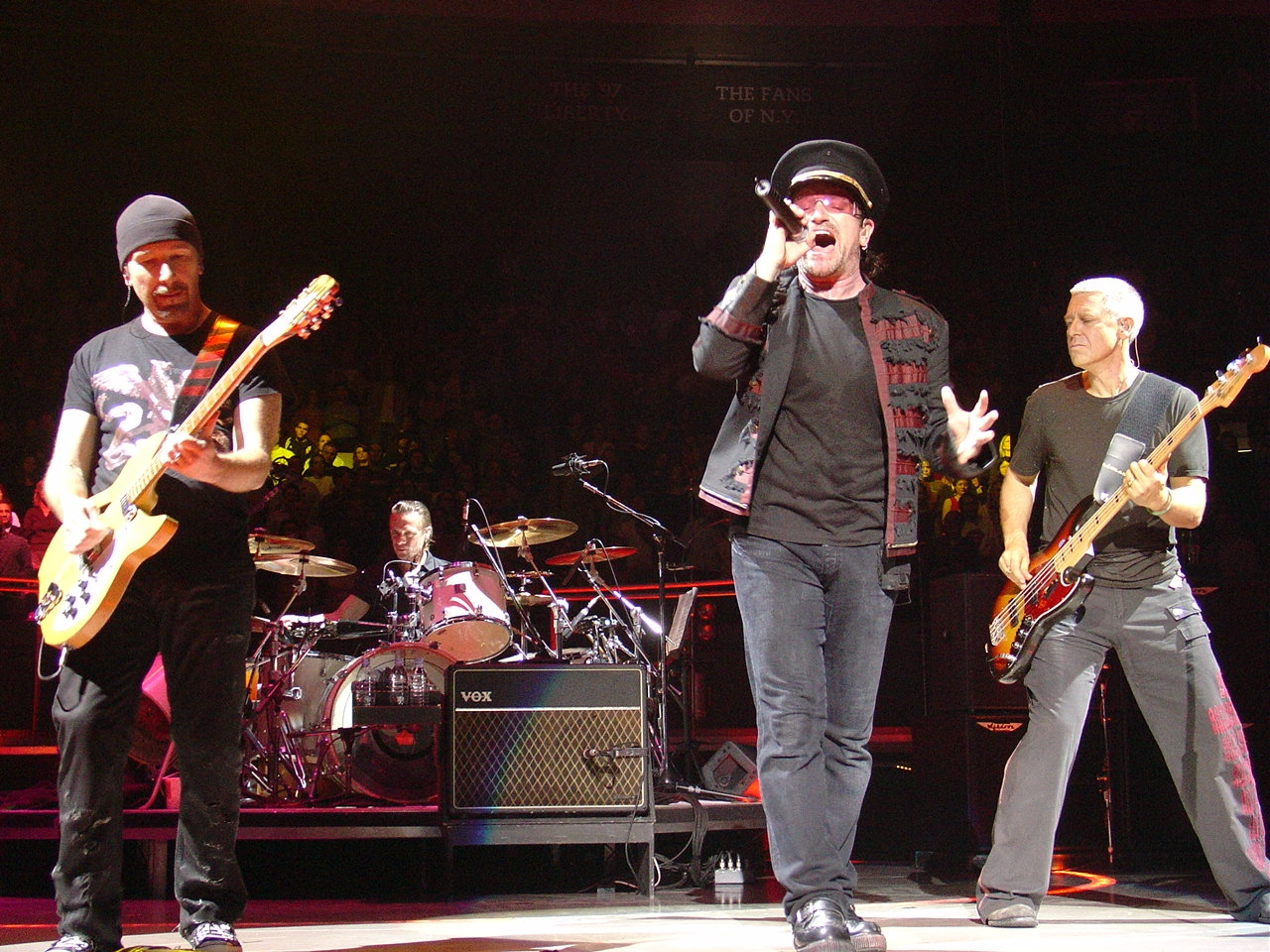
Rock Band 4 features tracks by the band U2, the first time songs from the group have been included in a rhythm game.

Rock Band 4 is the fourth main installment in the rhythm game series, Rock Band, developed by Harmonix. The game was released in October 2015, following a near three-year hiatus from the last DLC released for Rock Band 3. Following the over-saturation of the rhythm game market in 2009, weak sales of Rock Band 3 led Harmonix to put the series on hiatus, though the company continued to provide downloadable content through 2013. The release of Rock Band 4 was prompted by several factors, including the market penetration of the eighth generation consoles PlayStation 4 and Xbox One, a stronger internal vision for what Rock Band 4 should be within Harmonix, and continued support from fans of the series.

Rock Band 4 ships with 65 songs on the disc, spanning rock music and other genres from the 1960s to the 2010s. Though the game includes new features such as freestyle guitar solos and improved drum fills, Harmonix has worked to assure that at least 1,700 of the songs in its downloadable content library from past Rock Band games are compatible with Rock Band 4 and that players who have already bought songs on the previous iterations do not have to repurchase the songs in the newer game as long as they stay within the same console library. As of January 25, 2024, the final DLC content for the game has been released, with Harmonix focusing on the development of Fortnite Festival.

== Main soundtrack ==
Rock Band 4 is shipped with 65 songs on disc.

Song Title	Artist	Year	Genre
"Ain’t Messin ‘Round"	Gary Clark, Jr.	2012	Rock
"Albert"	Eddie Japan	2015	Indie Rock
"All Over You"	Live	1994	Alternative
"Arabella"	Arctic Monkeys	2013	Rock
"At Night in Dreams"	White Denim	2013	Indie Rock
"Birth in Reverse"	St. Vincent	2014	Indie Rock
"Brown Eyed Girl"	Van Morrison	1967	R&B/Soul/Funk
"Caught Up in You"	.38 Special	1982	Southern Rock
"Cedarwood Road"	U2	2014	Rock
"Centuries"	Fall Out Boy	2015	Pop-Rock
"Cold Clear Light"	Johnny Blazes and the Pretty Boys	2015	R&B/Soul/Funk
"Dead Black (Heart of Ice)"	Soul Remnants	2013	Metal
"Dream Genie"	Lightning Bolt	2015	Rock
"The Feast and the Famine"	Foo Fighters	2014	Alternative
"Fever"	The Black Keys	2014	Rock
"Follow You Down"	Gin Blossoms	1996	Alternative
"Free Falling"	The Warning	2015	Rock
"Friday I'm In Love"	The Cure	1992	New Wave
"Hail to the King"	Avenged Sevenfold	2013	Metal
"Halls of Valhalla"	Judas Priest	2014	Metal
"I Am Electric"	Heaven's Basement	2013	Rock
"I Bet My Life"	Imagine Dragons	2015	Alternative
"I Miss the Misery"	Halestorm	2012	Rock
"I Will Follow"	U2	1980	Rock
"The Impression That I Get"	The Mighty Mighty Bosstones	1997	Reggae/Ska
"Kick It Out"	Heart	1977	Classic Rock
"Knock Em Down"	Duck & Cover	2014	Punk
"Lazaretto"	Jack White	2014	Rock
"Light the Fuse"	Slydigs	2015	Rock
"Light Up the Night"	The Protomen	2009	Rock
"Little Miss Can't Be Wrong"	Spin Doctors	1991	Alternative
"Little White Church"	Little Big Town	2010	Country
"Mainstream Kid"	Brandi Carlile	2015	Blues
"Metropolis—Part I: "The Miracle and the Sleeper""	Dream Theater	1992	Prog
"Milwaukee"	The Both	2014	Pop-Rock
"Miracle Man"	Ozzy Osbourne	1988	Metal
"My God Is the Sun"	Queens of the Stone Age	2013	Alternative
"No One Like You" (2011 Re-record)	Scorpions	1982	Metal
"The One I Love"	R.E.M.	1987	Alternative
"Panama"	Van Halen	1984	Rock
"A Passage to Bangkok"	Rush	1976	Prog
"Pistol Whipped"	Tijuana Sweetheart	2012	Punk
"Prayer"	Disturbed	2002	Nu-Metal
"Recession"	Jeff Allen ft. Noelle LeBlanc and Naoko Takamoto	2015	Pop/Dance/Electronic
"Rock and Roll, Hoochie Koo"	Rick Derringer	1973	Classic Rock
"The Seeker"	The Who	1970	Classic Rock
"Short Skirt/Long Jacket"	Cake	2001	Alternative
"Somebody Told Me"	The Killers	2004	Alternative
"Spiders"	System of a Down	1998	Nu-Metal
"Start a Band"	Brad Paisley ft. Keith Urban	2008	Country
"Still Into You"	Paramore	2013	Pop-Rock
"Superunknown"	Soundgarden	1994	Grunge
"Suspicious Minds"	Elvis Presley	1969	Rock
"That Smell"	Lynyrd Skynyrd	1977	Southern Rock
"Tongue Tied"	Grouplove	2011	Indie Rock
"Toys in the Attic"	Aerosmith	1975	Rock
"Turn it Around"	Lucius	2013	Indie Rock
"Uptown Funk"	Mark Ronson ft. Bruno Mars	2015	R&B/Soul/Funk
"V-Bomb"	Dark Wheels	2015	Rock
"Violent Shiver"	Benjamin Booker	2014	Rock
"The Warrior"	Scandal	1984	Rock
"What's Up?"	4 Non Blondes	1992	Alternative
"The Wolf"	Mumford & Sons	2015	Rock
"You Make Loving Fun"	Fleetwood Mac	1977	Classic Rock
"Your Love"	The Outfield	1985	Pop-Rock

Rigopulos said of the main soundtrack that "The budget that we’ve allocated for the title supports a top-tier soundtrack". Harmonix allowed for fans to request songs to be included in the game, and tried to include the most-requested songs.

== Downloadable content ==
In addition to developing new songs for purchase following the release of Rock Band 4, Harmonix was also working to ensure that as much of its existing library of downloadable songs would be compatible with the game upon its release as possible; 1,500 songs were available at launch. Nearly all existing Rock Band DLC, including disc exports from previous games (excluding The Beatles: Rock Band), Track Packs, and Rock Band Blitz, will be transitioned to Rock Band 4 within the same console family at no cost to the player (i.e. PlayStation 4 can only import songs purchased on PlayStation 3, and Xbox One can only import songs purchased on Xbox 360). "If you bought a Rock Band song, it should be yours in Rock Band 4," said Sussman. "Everything that you have already exported will come over." At release, only individual songs were available for redownloading within Rock Band 4, with Harmonix working with Sony and Microsoft to offer support for existing song bundles and the various disc exports following the game's release. The Rock Band 3 disc export was available starting in early December 2015 for a small fee. Rock Band 1 songs were available in January 2016, and Rock Band 2 and Lego Rock Band songs followed in February 2016. In May 2018, Harmonix announced it would be bringing the most popular entries as well as fan-requested songs from the Rock Band Network into Rock Band 4; however, unlike regular Rock Band DLC, users are unable to carry over any previously purchased RBN songs due to technical and licensing constraints.

Most of the existing songs are updated with features new to Rock Band 4, specifically the use of Freestyle Guitar Solos for songs with guitar solos, and Freestyle Vocals. For songs previously released that would have vocal harmonies but did not have these harmonies presented in the Rock Band games, typically those prior to Rock Band 3's release, Harmonix has worked with fans to include such harmonies created by the fans in the Rock Band 4 version of these tracks. Other new features of Rock Band 4, such as new drum fills to trigger Overdrive, are automatically supported in any song by the game.

=== Pre-order songs ===
Depending on the nature of the sale, a number of songs were available as free bonuses to those that pre-ordered the game through various vendors; these songs were otherwise available at cost to other players.

A pre-order from Amazon included 4 exclusive songs for the Band-in-a-Box Bundle and Guitar Bundle pre-orders, on top of the original 30 free songs for those bundles. They included:

Song Title	Artist	Year
"Don't Wanna Fight"	Alabama Shakes	2015
"Failure"	Breaking Benjamin	2015
"Trainwreck 1979"	Death from Above 1979	2014
"Follow Me Down"	The Pretty Reckless	2014

PlayStation Network Plus members who pre-ordered via the PlayStation Store included:

Song Title	Artist	Year	Genre
"Divide"	All That Remains	2015	Metal
"Run for Cover"	Blitz Kids	2014	Pop-Rock
"Throne"	Bring Me the Horizon	2015	Nu-Metal
"Mona Lisa"	Dead Sara	2015	Alternative
"The Reflex"	Duran Duran	1983	Pop-Rock
"Move Over"	Janis Joplin	1971	Classic Rock
"Would You Still Be There"	Of Mice & Men	2014	Nu-Metal
"Sugar, You"	Oh Honey	2015	Indie Rock
"Cowboys from Hell" (Live from Monsters in Moscow Festival)	Pantera	1991	Metal
"Summertime Boy"	Seasick Steve	2015	Blues

Pre-ordering a digital copy on Xbox One via Xbox Live included:

Song Title	Artist	Year	Genre
"What If I Was Nothing"	All That Remains	2012	Metal
"High Road"	Mastodon	2014	Metal
"September"	Earth, Wind & Fire	1978	R&B/Soul/Funk
"Backwoods Company"	The Wild Feathers	2013	Southern Rock
"One Big Holiday"	My Morning Jacket	2003	Southern Rock
"Jane"	Jefferson Starship	1979	Classic Rock
"Gimme Chocolate!!"	Babymetal	2014	Metal
"King for a Day"	Pierce the Veil	2012	Alternative
"Rebellion"	Linkin Park	2014	Nu-Metal
"All the Rage Back Home"	Interpol	2014	Indie Rock
"The Mephistopheles of Los Angeles"	Marilyn Manson	2015	Alternative
"My Own Eyes"	"Weird Al" Yankovic	2014	Novelty

Pre-orders for the Band-in-a-Box and Guitar Bundles of the game shipped with 30 downloadable songs for free download; many of these include tracks by Harmonix employee-affiliated musical groups that had previously appeared in the first two Rock Band games.

=== Rivals expansion songs ===
Pre-orders for the October 2016 Rivals expansion received these songs free upon the expansion's release, while the songs were later offered on the storefront for individual purchase.

Song Title	Artist	Year	Genre
"Happy Song"	Bring Me the Horizon	2015	Nu-Metal
"Safe and Sound"	Capital Cities	2011	Pop/Dance/Electronic
"Save Tonight"	Eagle-Eye Cherry	1997	Alternative
"Sweater Weather"	The Neighbourhood	2011	Indie Rock
"Little Talks"	Of Monsters and Men	2011	Indie Rock
"Happy"	Pharrell Williams	2013	R&B/Soul/Funk
"Closing Time"	Semisonic	1998	Alternative
"Chandelier"	Sia	2014	Pop/Dance/Electronic
"Feel Invincible"	Skillet	2016	Rock
"King of the World"	Weezer	2016	Alternative

Two additional songs to the above ten are available for those that pre-order the expansion through Amazon.com.

Song Title	Artist	Year	Genre
"One More Night"	Maroon 5	2012	Pop-Rock
"3AM"	Matchbox Twenty	1997	Alternative

For users that have purchased the "Rivals" expansion, various updates brought more free songs; a December 2016 update brought twelve free songs from local Boston bands who had also been part of the Rockumentary footage; with the January 2017 Online Quickplay update, one additional free song was added to the "Rivals" expansion.

Song Title	Artist	Year	Genre
"Bethany"	Goddamn Draculas	2015	Rock
"Black Corridor"	Worshipper	2016	Metal
"Black Streak"	Nemes	2014	Indie Rock
"Closer, Closer"	The Warning Shots	2016	Punk
"Constant Disaster"	When Particles Collide	2014	Alternative
"Hour of Rats"	The Red Chord	2009	Metal
"I Recognize"	Newfane	2016	Alternative
"Mean Girls"	Petty Morals	2016	Pop-Rock
"Never Let 'Em Hold Ya Back!"	Parlour Bells	2016	Glam
"Pain Killer"	Ruby Rose Fox	2016	Indie Rock
"Shadow"	Bearstronaut	2016	Pop-Rock
"True Confessional"	Party Bois	2016	Pop/Dance/Electronic
"S.O.M.P"	Skratch'N Snyf	1990	Glam
"Sink"	Animal Flag	2016	Indie Rock
"These Hands"	Bent Knee	2016	Indie Rock
"No Place for Me"	Black Beach	2016	Rock
"History Repeats"	Creaturos	2016	Rock
"RudeBoys"	Dutch ReBelle	2016	Hip-Hop/Rap
"Hurry Up (& Wait for You)"	Julie Rhodes	2016	Indie Rock
"Casablanca"	Littlefoot	2016	Pop-Rock
"Cross That Line"	Michael Christmas	2016	Hip-Hop/Rap
"Skydiver"	Ruby Rose Fox	2016	Indie Rock
"Good"	STL GLD	2016	Hip-Hop/Rap
"Alone Time"	Tigerman WOAH	2016	Rock
"Sweater Weather"	Parks	2012	Pop-Rock
"To My Romeo"	Spirit Kid	2016	Pop-Rock
"Black Seas"	Arctic Horror	2016	Metal
"(You're) Breakin' Up"	The Black Cheers	2015	Punk
"Open Water"	Assuming We Survive	2016	Rock
"Shy"	Hunny	2017	Indie Rock
"Bloodhands (Oh My Fever)"	In the Valley Below	2017	Indie Rock
"Who's Your Lover"	Nightmare Air	2017	Indie Rock
"Radio"	No Small Children	2017	Rock
"Forget About Tomorrow"	The Bergamot	2016	Alternative
"I Hear the Dead"	Dolly Spartans	2017	Alternative
"Body Like That"	The Eiffels	2018	Alternative
"Vinyl"	Fly By Midnight	2018	Pop/Dance/Electronic
"Shame"	Jocelyn and Chris Arndt	2016	Rock
"Survive"	The Warning	2017	Rock
"This Will Be the Day"	Jeff Williams feat. Casey Lee Williams	2013	Rock
"Thinking Emoji"	Barely March	2018	Punk
"Love That Hurts"	PREACHERVAN	2018	Alternative
"Let's Just Dance"	Ships Have Sailed	2018	Alternative
"Save Yourself"	tiLLie	2017	Alternative

== Reception ==
The game's on-disc soundtrack was generally considered weaker than previous installments, describing it as primarily featuring "B-list" musicians, "lesser-known" songs by notable acts (such as Rush's "A Passage to Bangkok" and Foo Fighters "The Feast and the Famine") that had already been featured in Rock Band, and lacking a number of major acts that had historically made appearances in the franchise. Many reviewers were underwhelmed by the soundtrack but did acknowledge several "seriously inspired choices", such as the Protomen.
