= What Did I Do? / God as My Witness =

"What Did I Do?/God as My Witness"

Single by Foo Fighters

from the album Sonic Highways
- Released: November 6, 2014
- Studio: KLRU-TV Studio 6A, Austin, Texas
- Genre: Power pop
- Length: 5:44
- Label: RCA
- Songwriters: Dave Grohl; Taylor Hawkins; Nate Mendel; Chris Shiflett; Pat Smear
- Producers: Butch Vig; Foo Fighters

Foo Fighters singles chronology
"Congregation" (2014)	"What Did I Do?/God as My Witness" (2014)	"Outside" (2015)

"What Did I Do?/God as My Witness" is a song by American rock band Foo Fighters and is the fourth single from their eighth studio album Sonic Highways. The song was released on November 6, 2014.

== Recording ==
The song was recorded at KLRU-TV Studio 6A in Austin, Texas and features a guest appearance from Gary Clark Jr.

== Music video ==
The music video aired during the fourth episode of Foo Fighters: Sonic Highways. It mainly shows Foo Fighters and Gary Clark Jr. performing inside of KLRU-TV Studio 6A, the famous location where Austin City Limits was filmed.

== Personnel ==
Personnel taken from Sonic Highways liner notes.

Foo Fighters

- Dave Grohl – lead vocal, guitar
- Taylor Hawkins – drums, background vocals
- Nate Mendel – bass guitar
- Chris Shiflett – guitar
- Pat Smear – guitar

Additional Performers

- Rami Jaffee – piano, Wurlitzer, Mellotron, organ
- Gary Clark Jr. – lead guitar
- Drew Hester – tambourine

Production

- Butch Vig – producer
- Foo Fighters – producers
- James Brown – recording engineer, mixing engineer
- Gavin Lurssen – mastering
- Charlie Bolois – studio assistance
- John Lousteau – studio assistance

== Charts ==
Chart (2014)	Peak position
Czech Republic Modern Rock (IFPI)	5
UK Singles (OCC)	165
UK Rock & Metal (Official Charts)	6
US Hot Rock & Alternative Songs (Billboard)	37
