= The Feast and the Famine =

Single by Foo Fighters

from the album Sonic Highways
- Released: October 24, 2014
- Studio: Inner Ear, Arlington, VA
- Genre: Punk rock; hard rock
- Length: 3:49
- Label: RCA
- Songwriters: Dave Grohl; Taylor Hawkins; Nate Mendel; Chris Shiflett; Pat Smear
- Producers: Butch Vig; Foo Fighters

Foo Fighters singles chronology
"Something from Nothing" (2014)	"The Feast and the Famine" (2014)	"Congregation" (2014)

Music video
- "The Feast and the Famine" on YouTube

"The Feast and the Famine" is a song by American rock band Foo Fighters. It is the second song and second single from their eighth album Sonic Highways. The song was released on October 24, 2014.

== Background ==
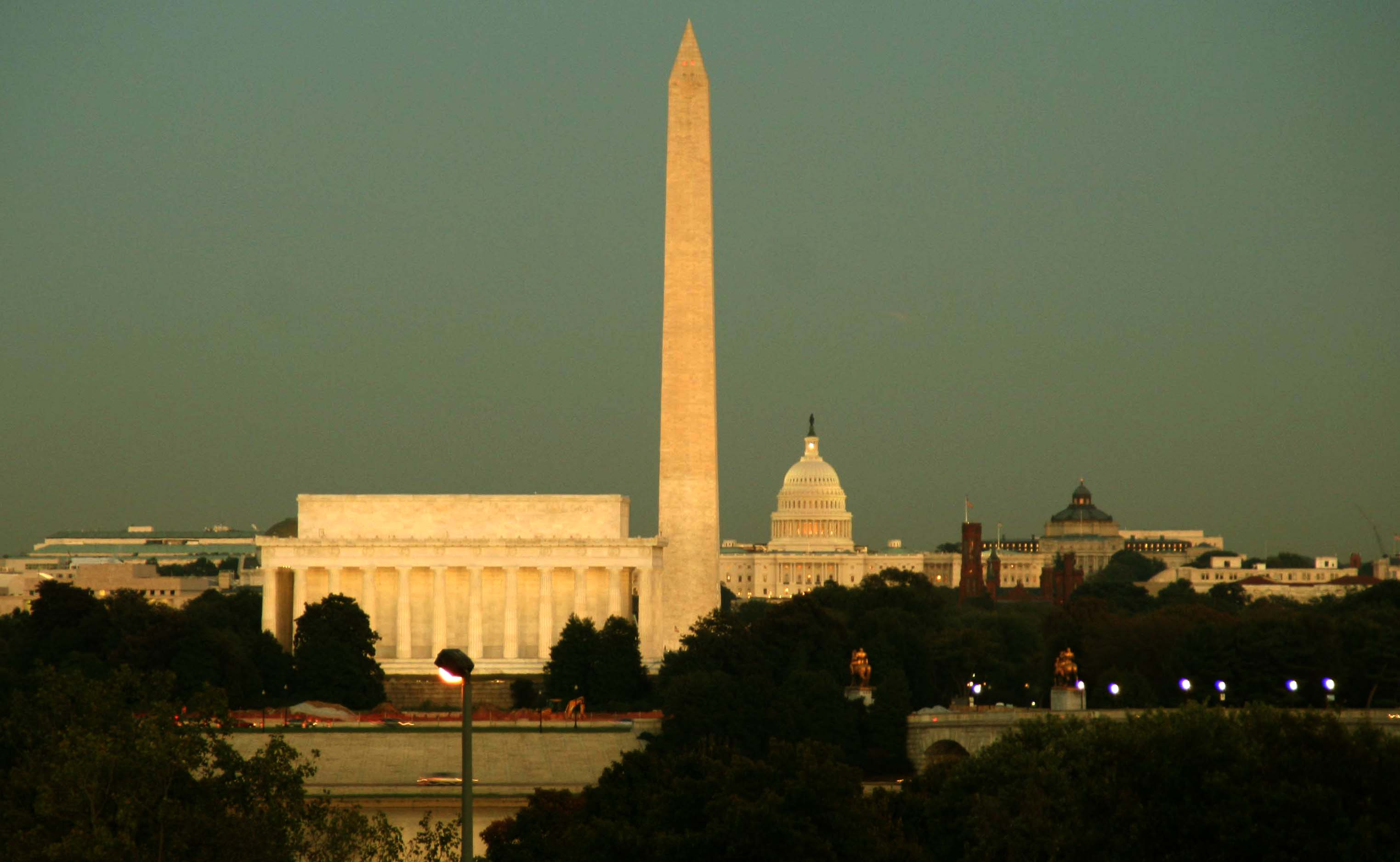
"The Feast and the Famine" was inspired by the history of Washington, D.C., and was recorded near the city at Inner Ear Studios.

The song is inspired by the iconic Washington D.C hardcore punk scene, with the band having traveled to eight different U.S cities to record each song on the album Sonic Highways. The song was recorded at Inner Ear Studio in Arlington County, Virginia, with gang vocals from Pete Stahl and Skeeter Thompson of Bailey's Crossroads, Virginia, punk band Scream. The lyric acronym PMA stands for Positive Mental Attitude.

== Live performances ==
The song was first played live at Washington, D.C.'s Black Cat club on October 24, 2014. It was played at a few club shows promoting their TV Series throughout the reminder of the year. The song only made one appearance during the Sonic Highways tour in 2015 and has not been played since then.

== Music video ==
During the "Washington D.C." episode of the TV series Foo Fighters: Sonic Highways, the band performs the song at Inner Ear Studios. Like "Something from Nothing", the music video also features lyrics appearing in the background. Indie Go-Go band RDGLDGRN made an appearance at the end of the video.

== Personnel ==
Personnel taken from Sonic Highways liner notes.

Foo Fighters

- Dave Grohl – lead vocal & guitar, background vocals
- Taylor Hawkins – drums, background vocals, gang vocals
- Nate Mendel – bass guitar
- Chris Shiflett – guitar
- Pat Smear – guitar

Additional performers

- Rami Jaffee – organ
- Pete Stahl – gang vocals
- Skeeter Thompson – gang vocals

Production

- Butch Vig – producer
- Foo Fighters – producers
- James Brown – recording engineer, mixing engineer
- Gavin Lurssen – mastering
- Don Zientara – studio assistance

== Charts ==
Chart (2014)	Peak position
Belgium (Ultratip Bubbling Under Flanders)	16
Scottish Singles Sales (Official Charts)	93
UK Singles (OCC)	164
UK Rock & Metal (Official Charts)	4
US Hot Rock & Alternative Songs (Billboard)	37
