= Congregation (song) =

Single by Foo Fighters

from the album Sonic Highways
- Released: October 31, 2014
- Studio: Southern Ground, Nashville, Tennessee
- Genre: Southern rock
- Length: 5:12
- Label: RCA
- Songwriters: Dave Grohl; Taylor Hawkins; Nate Mendel; Chris Shiflett; Pat Smear
- Producers: Butch Vig; Foo Fighters

Foo Fighters singles chronology
"The Feast and the Famine" (2014)	"Congregation" (2014)	"What Did I Do? / God As My Witness" (2014)

"Congregation" is a song by American rock band Foo Fighters. It is the third official single and the second radio single from their eighth studio album Sonic Highways. It was released on October 31, 2014. The song features country music singer Zac Brown, with whom Grohl collaborated with on Zac Brown Band's extended play The Grohl Sessions, Vol. 1.

== Recording ==
The song was recorded at Southern Ground Studios in Nashville, Tennessee and featured in the third episode of TV documentary Foo Fighters: Sonic Highways which documents the music history of Nashville. The third episode of Foo Fighters: Sonic Highways focuses on the country music scene of Nashville that is known as the Nashville sound. Foo Fighters' bassist Nate Mendel told NME that "The song 'Congregation' is a play on how a lot of the folks in the Nashville country music scene came together in church, in a sort of gospel environment, to learn their craft."

Foo Fighters' frontman Dave Grohl told Q: "Zac Brown is an enormous country star. I met him in a store and he asked me to produce an album. I'd never heard of him. I said to someone, 'Zac Brown has asked me to produce him' - they said, 'You should do it, he's huge' So I did the record without hearing any of his songs." Grohl also explained that the lyrics: "And they're singing like a bluebird in the round," references Nashville's iconic Bluebird Café, stating that "The Bluebird I knew a little bit about, but I learned a lot," explained Grohl. "In Nashville, it seems like there are these rites of passage that you have to go through to become a star, whether you're a singer or a songwriter, and the Bluebird is really one of those. If you can get down at the Bluebird, you've got a gig."

== Release and reception ==
Upon release, Billboard stated that "Congregation" was "the best song from Sonic Highways yet" and that "despite the (Zac) Brown/Nashville connection, "Congregation" is less country and more '70s classic rock—this is the sound of souped-up car racing down the open highway.

== Music video ==
The music video appeared at the end of the Foo Fighters: Sonic Highways episode "Nashville". Taking place at Southern Ground Studios, the band along with an appearance by Zac Brown, perform the song in its entirety as 2D animated lyrics appear.

== Personnel ==
Personnel adapted from Sonic Highways liner notes.

Foo Fighters

- Dave Grohl – lead vocal & guitar
- Taylor Hawkins – drums
- Nate Mendel – bass guitar
- Chris Shiflett – guitar, "devil pickin'"
- Pat Smear – guitar, baritone guitar

Additional Performers

- Rami Jaffee – piano, organ
- Zac Brown – "devil pickin'", background vocals
- Drew Hester – percussion

Production

- Butch Vig – producer
- Foo Fighters – producers
- James Brown – recording engineer, mixing engineer
- Gavin Lurssen – mastering
- Brandon Bell – studio assistance
- Matt Mangano – studio assistance
- Ben Simoneti – studio assistance

== Charts ==
=== Weekly charts ===
Chart (2014–15)	Peak position
Austria (Ö3 Austria Top 40)	73
Belgium (Ultratip Bubbling Under Flanders)	12
Canada Rock (Billboard)	1
Czech Republic Modern Rock (IFPI)	10
Finland Airplay (Radiosoittolista)	62
Germany (GfK)	97
Scottish Singles Sales (Official Charts)	68
UK Rock & Metal (Official Charts)	4
US Hot Rock & Alternative Songs (Billboard)	21
US Rock & Alternative Airplay (Billboard)	1

=== Year end charts ===
Chart (2015)	Position
US Hot Rock Songs (Billboard)	69
US Rock Airplay (Billboard)	17
