= I Am a River =

Promotional single by Foo Fighters

from the album Sonic Highways
- Released: 2015
- Studio: Magic Shop (New York City)
- Genre: Heartland rock
- Length: 7:09
- Label: Roswell; RCA
- Songwriters: Dave Grohl; Pat Smear; Taylor Hawkins; Nate Mendel; Chris Shiflett
- Producers: Foo Fighters; Butch Vig

Foo Fighters singles chronology
"Outside" (2015)	"I Am a River" (2015)	"Saint Cecilia" (2015)

Music video
- "I Am a River" on YouTube

"I Am a River" is a song by the American rock band Foo Fighters. It was released on their 2014 album Sonic Highways.

== Composition and lyrics ==
The song was written in New York, with lyrics talking about the "Intricate" references to the city's musical history.

== Reception ==
When reviewing Sonic Highways for Pitchfork, critic Stuart Berman wrote it was a "gaudy Macy’s Day Parade of a power ballad that, just when you think can’t get any more overblown, piles on a false ending and string-section finale".

== Live performances ==
It has only been played live twice, once during their performance at the Irving Plaza in New York in 2014 and again on the Tonight Show Starring Jimmy Fallon in 2014.

== Credits and personnel ==
Credits taken from the Sonic Highways liner notes:

Foo Fighters

- Dave Grohl – lead vocal & guitar
- Taylor Hawkins – drums
- Nate Mendel – bass guitar
- Chris Shiflett – guitar
- Pat Smear – guitar

Additional musicians

- Rami Jaffee – organ, piano, "space keys"
- Kristeen Young – background vocals
- Drew Hester – tambourine
- Tony Visconti – string arrangement
- Los Angeles Youth Orchestra – strings

Technical personnel

- Foo Fighters – production
- Butch Vig – production
- James Brown – recording engineer, mixing engineer
- Kabir Hermon – studio assistance
- Chris Shurtleff – studio assistance, orchestra coordinator

== Charts ==
2014–2016 weekly chart performance for "I Am a River"
Chart (2014–2016)	Peak position
Finland Airplay (Radiosoittolista)	61
Poland AirPlay Top (PSPI)	25
UK Rock & Metal (Official Charts)	15
US Mexico Ingles Airplay (Billboard)	50
