= Madden NFL 25 =

Madden NFL 25 may refer to:

- Madden NFL 25 (2013 video game), a video game released in 2013 for the franchise's 25th anniversary
- Madden NFL 25 (2024 video game), a video game released in 2024 as the franchise's yearly installment
