= Madden NFL 24 =

2023 video game

- Standard edition cover art featuring Josh Allen
- Developer: EA Tiburon
- Publisher: EA Sports
- Series: Madden NFL
- Engine: Frostbite 3
- Platforms: PlayStation 4; PlayStation 5; Windows; Xbox One; Xbox Series X/S
- Release: August 18, 2023
- Genre: Sports
- Modes: Single-player, multiplayer

Madden NFL 24 is an American football video game developed by EA Tiburon and published by EA Sports. Based on the National Football League (NFL), it is the 34th installment of the Madden NFL series and follows Madden NFL 23. Buffalo Bills quarterback Josh Allen is the cover athlete for the game.

Madden NFL 24 was released on August 18, 2023 for PlayStation 4, PlayStation 5, Windows, Xbox One, and Xbox Series X/S. Like previous titles in the series, the game received mixed reviews from critics.

== Gameplay ==
Madden NFL 24 introduces exclusive next gen features, including SAPIEN technology, which allows for more realistic movement and more lifelike player models. Gameplay includes the return of refs to the field, improved blocking and Fieldsense. It also improves the hitting and tackling system with more than 1,000 new animations.

Franchise mode includes the return of mini games for the first time since Madden NFL 12 as an exclusive feature in next gen, an increased amount of trade slots, added more cities and new and updated uniforms for relocation, and an improved free agency and draft system.

Superstar mode also makes its return as an exclusive mode for next gen consoles with one for offline players titled "The League", and one for online players titled "Showdown", also known on last gen as "The Yard".

Buffalo Bills quarterback Josh Allen was revealed as the cover athlete for the game in June 2023.

== Reception ==
Reception

Aggregate score
Aggregator	Score
Metacritic	(PS5) 65/100 (XSXS) 62/100

Review scores
Publication	Score
Game Informer	6.75/10
GameSpot	5/10
GamesRadar+	2/5 stars
Hardcore Gamer	4/5
IGN	6/10
VideoGamer.com	8/10

Madden NFL 24 received "mixed or average" reviews from critics, according to Metacritic.

IGN wrote: "Madden NFL 24 makes several much-needed improvements to the on-field experience thanks to fantastic additions to animations and AI, but it still suffers from the same problems it always has once you get off the field: everything here is just done better in every other sports sim, even the other ones made by EA, and this year's tweaks just aren't enough to make up for the series' continued feeling of sameness and lack of progress."

GamesRadar+ said: "No matter what nominally noticeable technical changes are happening under Madden 24's hood, they don't represent the gargantuan changes needed to bring the NFL series in line with various yearly sports game competition."

GameSpot wrote: "Madden 24 is a paradox. I would not want to revert to a previous year's game simply because the on-field gameplay is clearly better, while virtually everything surrounding its best attribute feels incomplete or undesirable. It feels as though Madden is now like a team with a star quarterback surrounded by a bad offensive line, unreliable wideouts, and a porous defense. There is greatness to appreciate here, but in the prime of its career, Madden 24 is being held back by a roster not able to compete at a high level."
