= Something from Nothing (song) =

2014 single by Foo Fighters

Single by Foo Fighters

from the album Sonic Highways
- Released: October 16, 2014
- Studio: Electrical Audio, Chicago
- Genre: Alternative rock; hard rock
- Length: 4:48
- Label: RCA
- Songwriters: Dave Grohl; Taylor Hawkins; Nate Mendel; Chris Shiflett; Pat Smear
- Producers: Butch Vig; Foo Fighters

Foo Fighters singles chronology
| "Bridge Burning" (2012) | "Something from Nothing" (2014) | "The Feast and the Famine" (2014) |

Music video
- "Something from Nothing" on YouTube

"Something from Nothing" is a song by American rock band Foo Fighters from their eighth studio album Sonic Highways. It was released as the album's lead single on October 16, 2014. Recorded at Steve Albini's Electrical Audio studio, the song was influenced by the Chicago music scene.

== Composition ==
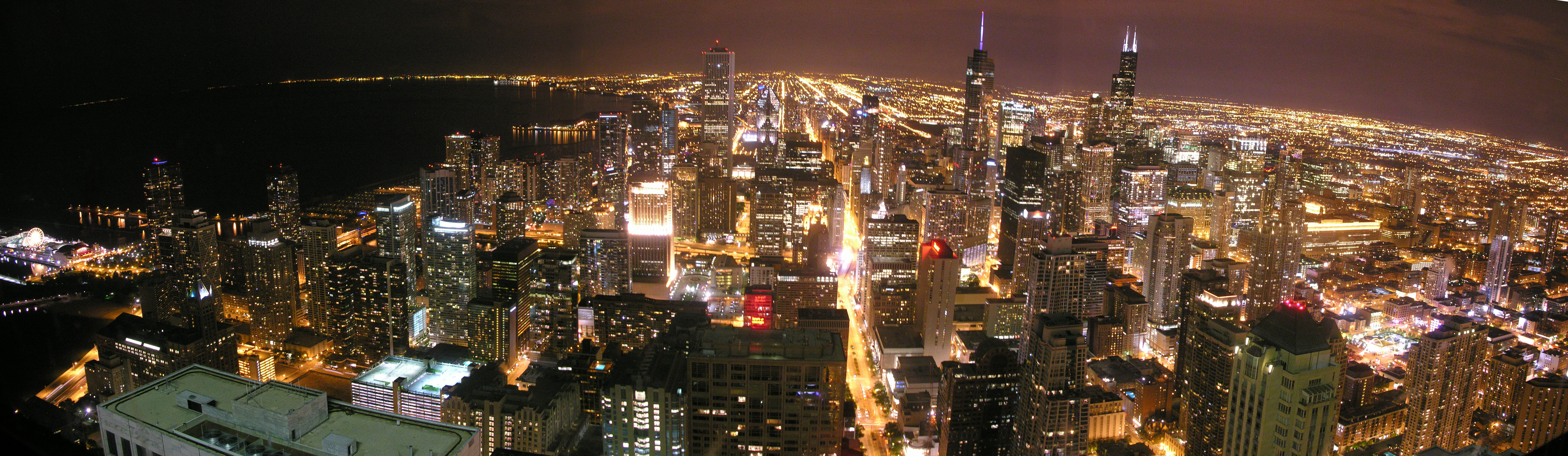
"Something from Nothing" was inspired by the history of Chicago, Illinois, and was recorded in the city at Electrical Audio.

"Something from Nothing" has been regarded as an alternative rock and hard rock song. According to Daniel Kreps of the Rolling Stone magazine, the lyrics of the song "Here lies a city on fire... it started with a spark, and burned into the dark" seem to be inspired by the Great Chicago Fire (1871).

"Something from Nothing" is "a ferocious, at times even hypnotic, rocker with hints of funk, psychedelia, and Dave Grohl's signature monster growl." It features soaring guitar that is reminiscent of Chicago-based alternative rock band The Smashing Pumpkins; and at one point, borrows heavily from the riff of Dio's heavy metal song "Holy Diver". The song starts with muffled guitar, and subsequently builds up to "non-stop ferocious rock 'n' roll" in its fourth minute, and "an ear-shattering outro lined with scorching guitar riffs."

== Recording ==
"Something from Nothing" was recorded at Albini's Electrical Audio studio in Chicago. The song features guitarist Rick Nielsen of the rock band Cheap Trick as Chicago City's "guest of honor."

== Music video ==
The music video aired at the end of the Foo Fighters: Sonic Highways "Chicago" episode. It shows the band performing at Electrical Audio while 2D animated lyrics appear in the background throughout the video. The video also features appearances by Rick Nielsen and future member Rami Jaffee.

== Commercial performance ==
"Something from Nothing" debuted at number five on the Billboard Rock Airplay chart, as well as at number 12 and number 16 on Billboard's Alternative Songs and Mainstream Rock charts respectively. It soon rose to number one on all three charts. "Something from Nothing" is also the twenty-fifth Foo Fighters' single to make the top 75 on the UK Singles Chart, and the twenty-seventh Foo Fighters' single to make the top 100 on the Australian Singles Chart.

== Personnel ==
Personnel taken from Sonic Highways liner notes.

Foo Fighters

- Dave Grohl – lead vocal & guitar, background vocals
- Taylor Hawkins – drums, background vocals
- Nate Mendel – bass guitar
- Chris Shiflett – guitar
- Pat Smear – guitar

Additional performers

- Rami Jaffee – clavinet, organ, Mellotron
- Rick Nielsen – baritone guitar

Production

- Butch Vig – producer
- Foo Fighters – producers
- James Brown – recording engineer, mixing engineer
- Gavin Lurssen – mastering
- Greg Norman – studio assistance
- Jon San Paolo – studio assistance

== Charts ==
=== Weekly charts ===
Weekly chart performance for "Something from Nothing"
| Chart (2014) | Peak position |
|---|---|
| Australia (ARIA) | 53 |
| Austria (Ö3 Austria Top 40) | 75 |
| Belgium (Ultratop 50 Flanders) | 42 |
| Belgium (Ultratip Bubbling Under Wallonia) | 19 |
| Canada Hot 100 (Billboard) | 63 |
| Canada Rock (Billboard) | 1 |
| Czech Republic Modern Rock (IFPI) | 5 |
| Finland Download (Latauslista) | 22 |
| Germany (GfK) | 100 |
| Japan Hot 100 (Billboard) | 63 |
| Mexico Ingles Airplay (Billboard) | 39 |
| Netherlands (Single Top 100) | 57 |
| New Zealand (Recorded Music NZ) | 32 |
| Quebec Airplay (ADISQ) | 50 |
| Scotland Singles (Official Charts) | 56 |
| Switzerland Airplay (Schweizer Hitparade) | 79 |
| UK Singles (Official Charts) | 73 |
| UK Rock & Metal (Official Charts) | 1 |
| US Bubbling Under Hot 100 (Billboard) | 1 |
| US Hot Rock & Alternative Songs (Billboard) | 8 |
| US Rock & Alternative Airplay (Billboard) | 1 |

=== Year-end charts ===
2014 year-end chart performance for "Something from Nothing"
| Chart (2014) | Position |
|---|---|
| US Hot Rock Songs (Billboard) | 95 |
| US Rock Airplay (Billboard) | 38 |

2015 year-end chart performance for "Something from Nothing"
| Chart (2015) | Position |
|---|---|
| US Hot Rock Songs (Billboard) | 46 |
| US Rock Airplay (Billboard) | 5 |
