= Sonic Highways =

Studio album by Foo Fighters
- Released: November 10, 2014
- Recorded: September 2013 – July 2014
- Studios: Electrical Audio (Chicago); Inner Ear (Arlington); Southern Ground (Nashville); 6A (Austin); Rancho De La Luna (Joshua Tree); Preservation Hall (New Orleans); Robert Lang (Seattle); Magic Shop (New York City)
- Genres: Alternative rock; hard rock; post-grunge; rock and roll
- Length: 42:08
- Labels: Roswell; RCA
- Producers: Foo Fighters; Butch Vig

Foo Fighters chronology
Medium Rare (2011)	Sonic Highways (2014)	Songs from the Laundry Room (2015)

Singles from Sonic Highways
- 1. "Something from Nothing" Released: October 16, 2014; 2. "The Feast and the Famine" Released: October 24, 2014; 3. "Congregation" Released: October 31, 2014; 4. "What Did I Do? / God as My Witness" Released: November 6, 2014; 5. "Outside" Released: August 4, 2015

Sonic Highways is the eighth studio album by American rock band Foo Fighters, released on November 10, 2014, through Roswell and RCA Records. Similar to their previous album, Wasting Light (2011), it was produced by the band with Butch Vig. In writing the album's eight songs, singer and guitarist Dave Grohl traveled to eight cities across the United States to conduct interviews with musicians, recording engineers, record producers, and other individuals discussing each city's musical history, which he used as inspiration for the songs' lyrics. The band and Vig then traveled to a different recording location in each city to record the songs. Each track features contributions from one or more musicians with ties to that city's musical history. The process was filmed for a companion television series, Foo Fighters: Sonic Highways, which was broadcast on HBO in the months surrounding the album's release.

== Background and writing ==
Despite initially announcing a break after supporting Wasting Light, Grohl later stated in January 2013 that the band had started writing material for an eighth studio album. On February 20, 2013, at the Brit Awards, Grohl said he was flying back to America the following day to start work on the next album. In an August 2013 interview with XFM, Grohl announced that their next album was slated for a 2014 release, saying:

"Well, I’ll tell you, we have been in our studio writing and in the past few weeks we’ve written an album and we are going to make this album in a way that no-one’s ever done before and we’re pretty excited about it... It’s a little ways off – it’s not ready to happen right now – but I think next year is going to be a really big year for the Foo Fighters, without question."

According to lead guitarist Chris Shiflett, Grohl would finish the lyrics just before recording his vocals, the last part of each song. This time the compositions would drift away from "love letters and confused relationships" to deal with the feelings Grohl had regarding each city during production.

== Recording ==
On September 6, 2013, lead guitarist Chris Shiflett posted a photo to his Instagram account that indicated 13 songs were being recorded for the album. Keyboardist Rami Jaffee recorded parts for three songs, one of which is entitled "In the Way." Butch Vig, who produced the band's prior album, Wasting Light, confirmed he produced Sonic Highways as well. On July 30, 2014, Vig revealed that the band had finished recording and mixing the new album and that it was slated to be released a month after the Sonic Highways TV series. In an August 2014 press release, Grohl spoke about the album, saying: "This album is instantly recognizable as a Foo Fighters record, but there's something deeper and more musical to it. I think that these cities and these people influenced us to stretch out and explore new territory, without losing our ‘sound’."

== Composition ==
Musically, Sonic Highways has been described as an alternative rock, hard rock, post-grunge and rock and roll album, with elements of blues and punk rock.

== Packaging ==
The album artwork by Stephan Martiniere has a cityscape amalgamating landmarks of every town used for production – Seattle's Space Needle, the Hollywood Sign in Los Angeles – and a recurring motif of the number eight, marking both the Foo Fighters' eighth album and infinity (∞). The vinyl pressings of the album are packaged in nine different covers, depicting each of the eight cities and the "Forever" building shaped like the infinity symbol. Most retailers would not guarantee which cover the purchaser would receive, and album art is "randomly selected" for orders from the band's official website.

== Promotion ==
On January 16, 2014, a picture was posted to the Foo Fighters Facebook page with several master tapes, some labeled "LP 8". On May 15, 2014, it was announced that the band's eighth album would be released in November 2014 and that the Foo Fighters would commemorate the album and their 20th anniversary with an HBO TV series directed by Dave Grohl entitled Foo Fighters: Sonic Highways. On August 11, 2014, it was announced that the album would be titled Sonic Highways and released on November 10, 2014.

== Critical reception ==
Professional ratings
Aggregate scores
Source	Rating
AnyDecentMusic?	6.4/10
Metacritic	68/100
Review scores
Source	Rating
AllMusic	3.5/5 stars
The A.V. Club	B−
The Daily Telegraph	3/5 stars
Entertainment Weekly	B
The Guardian	2/5 stars
NME	7/10
Pitchfork	5.6/10
Q	4/5 stars
Rolling Stone	3.5/5 stars
Uncut	8/10

At Metacritic, which assigns a normalized rating out of 100 to reviews from mainstream critics, the album received an average score of 68, based on 31 reviews indicating "generally favorable reviews". Stephen Thomas Erlewine of AllMusic says the album "celebrates not the coiled fury of underground rock exploding into the mainstream, the way the '90s-happy Wasting Light did, but rather the classic rock that unites the U.S. from coast to coast." Philip Cosores at Consequence of Sound stated "the album plays out more like a bonus feature, something that can enhance the series’ enjoyment or simply further inform the experience".

Patrick Doyle from Rolling Stone noted that some of the album's songs are among "the band's most ambitious moments yet". Stuart Berman of Pitchfork was more critical of the album, stating "Foo Fighters completely demystify their own creative process, effectively turning the Sonic Highways project into a glorified homework assignment—educational, perhaps, but laboriously procedural."

== Commercial performance ==
The album debuted at number two on the Billboard 200, with sales of 190,000 copies in the United States. As of September 2015, it has sold 490,000 copies in the US.

== Track listing ==
All tracks are written by Foo Fighters (Dave Grohl, Taylor Hawkins, Nate Mendel, Chris Shiflett, and Pat Smear).

Sonic Highways track listing
No.	Title	Recording location	Length
1.	"Something from Nothing" (featuring Rick Nielsen)	Electrical Audio, Chicago, Illinois	4:49
2.	"The Feast and the Famine" (featuring Peter Stahl and Skeeter Thompson)	Inner Ear Studios, Arlington County, Virginia	3:50
3.	"Congregation" (featuring Zac Brown)	Southern Ground Studios, Nashville, Tennessee	5:12
4.	"What Did I Do? / God as My Witness" (featuring Gary Clark, Jr.)	Studio 6A, Austin, Texas	5:44
5.	"Outside" (featuring Joe Walsh and Chris Goss)	Rancho De La Luna, Joshua Tree, California	5:15
6.	"In the Clear" (featuring the Preservation Hall Jazz Band)	Preservation Hall, New Orleans, Louisiana	4:04
7.	"Subterranean" (featuring Ben Gibbard)	Robert Lang Studios, Seattle, Washington	6:08
8.	"I Am a River" (featuring Tony Visconti and Kristeen Young)	The Magic Shop, New York City, New York	7:09
Total length:			42:08

== Personnel ==
Credits taken from the album's liner notes.

Foo Fighters

- Dave Grohl – lead vocal & guitar; background vocals (tracks 1, 2), gang vocals (6); acoustic guitar, cymbals, and EBow (7); producer
- Taylor Hawkins – drums; background vocals (tracks 1, 2, 4–6), gang vocals (2, 6); producer
- Nate Mendel – bass guitar; producer
- Chris Shiflett – guitar; "devil pickin'" (track 3), gang vocals (6); producer
- Pat Smear – guitar; baritone guitar (track 3); producer

Additional musicians

- Rami Jaffee – organ; Mellotron (tracks 1, 4, 5, 7), piano (3, 4, 6, 8), Wurlitzer electric piano (4, 7), clavinet (1), gang vocals (6), "space keys" (8)
- Rick Nielsen – baritone guitar (track 1)
- Peter Stahl – gang vocals (track 2)
- Skeeter Thompson – gang vocals (track 2)
- Zac Brown – "devil pickin'" and background vocals (track 3)
- Drew Hester – percussion (track 3); tambourine (4, 8)
- Gary Clark, Jr. – lead guitar (track 4)
- Chris Goss – background vocals (track 5)
- Joe Walsh – lead guitar (track 5)
- Mark Braud – trumpet (track 6)
- Charlie Gabriel – clarinet (track 6)
- Ben Jaffe – tuba (track 6)
- Ronell Johnson – tuba and gang vocals (track 6)
- Freddie Lonzo – trombone (track 6)
- Clint Maedgen – saxophone and gang vocals (track 6)
- Jim Rota – gang vocals (track 6)
- Ben Gibbard – background vocals (track 7)
- Barrett Jones – EBow (track 7)
- Los Angeles Youth Orchestra – strings (track 8)
- Tony Visconti – string arrangement (track 8)
- Kristeen Young – background vocals (track 8)

Production

- Justin Armstrong – studio assistance (Robert Lang Studios)
- Brandon Bell – studio assistance (Southern Ground Studios)
- Charlie Bolois – studio assistance (Studio 6A, Rancho De La Luna, and Preservation Hall)
- Dakota Bowman – studio assistance (Atomic Sound)
- James Brown – recording engineer, mixing engineer
- Reuben Cohen – mastering
- Marcel Fernandez – studio assistance (Robert Lang Studios)
- Kabir Hermon – studio assistance (The Magic Shop)
- John Lousteau – studio assistance (Atomic Sound, Studio 6A, and Preservation Hall); gang vocals (track 6)
- Gavin Lurssen – mastering
- Matt Mangano – studio assistance (Southern Ground Studios)
- Greg Norman – studio assistance (Electrical Audio)
- Jon San Paolo – studio assistance (Electrical Audio)
- Matthias Schneeberger – studio assistance (Rancho De La Luna)
- Chris Shurtleff – studio assistance (The Magic Shop)
- Ben Simoneti – studio assistance (Southern Ground Studios)
- Butch Vig – producer
- Don Zientara – studio assistance (Inner Ear Studios)
- Gersh Gershunoff – drum tech

Artwork

- Stephan Martiniere – cover illustration
- Ringo – photographs
- Andrew Stuart – photographs
- Morning Breath, Inc. – art direction and design
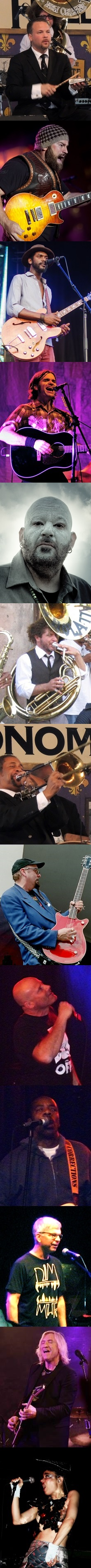
From top to bottom: Sonic Highways features contributions from guest musicians Mark Braud, Zac Brown, Gary Clark, Jr., Ben Gibbard, Chris Goss, Ben Jaffe, Freddie Lonzo, Rick Nielsen, Peter Stahl, Skeeter Thompson, Tony Visconti, Joe Walsh, and Kristeen Young, among others.

== Charts ==
=== Weekly charts ===
2014 weekly chart performance
Chart (2014)	Peak position
Australian Albums (ARIA)	1
Austrian Albums (Ö3 Austria)	3
Belgian Albums (Ultratop Flanders)	1
Belgian Albums (Ultratop Wallonia)	4
Canadian Albums (Billboard)	3
Danish Albums (Hitlisten)	4
Dutch Albums (Album Top 100)	2
Finnish Albums (Suomen virallinen lista)	5
French Albums (SNEP)	18
German Albums (Offizielle Top 100)	2
Greek Albums (IFPI)	39
Hungarian Albums (MAHASZ)	35
Irish Albums (IRMA)	5
Italian Albums (FIMI)	7
Japanese Albums (Oricon)	12
New Zealand Albums (RMNZ)	2
Norwegian Albums (VG-lista)	3
Polish Albums (ZPAV)	10
Portuguese Albums (AFP)	8
Scottish Albums (Official Charts)	2
Spanish Albums (Promusicae)	9
Swedish Albums (Sverigetopplistan)	5
Swiss Albums (Schweizer Hitparade)	2
UK Albums (Official Charts)	2
US Billboard 200	2
US Top Alternative Albums (Billboard)	1
US Top Hard Rock Albums (Billboard)	1
US Top Rock Albums (Billboard)	1

=== Year-end charts ===
2014 year-end chart performance
Chart (2014)	Position
Australian Albums (ARIA)	16
Austrian Albums (Ö3 Austria)	61
Belgian Albums (Ultratop Flanders)	20
Belgian Albums (Ultratop Wallonia)	110
Dutch Albums (Album Top 100)	47
German Albums (Offizielle Top 100)	72
Italian Albums (FIMI)	72
New Zealand Albums (RMNZ)	18
Swiss Albums (Schweizer Hitparade)	65
UK Albums (OCC)	26
US Billboard 200	99
US Alternative Albums (Billboard)	13
US Hard Rock Albums (Billboard)	5
US Rock Albums (Billboard)	20

2015 year-end chart performance
Chart (2015)	Position
Australian Albums (ARIA)	76
Belgian Albums (Ultratop Flanders)	32
Belgian Albums (Ultratop Wallonia)	156
US Billboard 200	126
US Hard Rock Albums (Billboard)	3
US Rock Albums (Billboard)	13
US Soundtrack Albums (Billboard)	9

== Certifications ==
Certifications for Sonic Highways
Region	Certification	Certified units/sales
Australia (ARIA)	Platinum	70,000^{^}
Austria (IFPI Austria)	Gold	7,500^{*}
Canada (Music Canada)	Platinum	80,000^{^}
Germany (BVMI)	Gold	100,000^{‡}
Italy (FIMI)	Gold	25,000^{*}
Netherlands (NVPI)	Gold	20,000^{^}
New Zealand (RMNZ)	Platinum	15,000^{^}
United Kingdom (BPI)	Platinum	316,770
^{*} Sales figures based on certification alone.^{^} Shipments figures based on certification alone.^{‡} Sales+streaming figures based on certification alone.
