= Foo Fighters: Sonic Highways =

American television miniseries

- Genre: Rockumentary
- Created by: Dave Grohl
- Written by: Mark Monroe
- Directed by: Dave Grohl
- Starring: Dave Grohl; Taylor Hawkins; Nate Mendel; Chris Shiflett; Pat Smear; Rami Jaffee; Butch Vig
- Opening theme: "Something from Nothing" by Foo Fighters
- Composer: Bryan Lee Brown
- Country of origin: United States
- Original language: English
- No. of episodes: 8

Production
- Executive producers: James A. Rota; John Ramsay; Dave Grohl
- Producers: John Silva; Gaby Skolnek; John Cutcliffe; Kristen Welsh
- Production location: Various: Austin; Chicago; Los Angeles; Nashville; New Orleans; New York City; Seattle; Washington, D.C.
- Cinematography: Kenny Stoff; Jessica Young
- Editors: Meg Ramsay; Kristin McCasey; Scott D. Hanson; Grant MacDowell; Brian Lazarte; Lenny Mesina
- Running time: 60 minutes
- Production companies: Roswell Films; Therapy Content; Diamond Docs; Worldwide Pants Incorporated

Original release
- Network: HBO
- Release: October 17 – December 5, 2014

Sonic Highways is a 2014 American documentary miniseries directed by Dave Grohl and written by Mark Monroe. The documentary was made concurrently with Foo Fighters' eighth album, Sonic Highways, and was broadcast on HBO. Grohl described the project as "a love letter to the history of American music". Each of the eight episodes is presented as an exploration of the musical history of a different American city through a series of interviews by Grohl. The group is also shown incorporating what they learned from the interviews into the writing and recording of a new song in or near that city. The series debuted on October 17, 2014.

== Development ==
After the success of Grohl's 2013 documentary film Sound City, he expressed interest to Billboard of doing something similar. According to Grohl,

After making Sound City, I realized that the pairing of music and documentary works well because the stories give substance and depth to the song, which makes for a stronger emotional connection. So I thought, ‘I want to do this again, but instead of just walking into a studio and telling its story, I want to travel across America and tell its story.

On May 15, 2014, it was announced that the Foo Fighters' eighth album would be released in the fall of 2014, and that the band would commemorate the album and their 20th anniversary with the TV series. Each song on the new album was recorded in a different city, featuring “local legends” on each song and lyrics inspired by the ”experiences, interviews and personalities that became part of the process.”

On May 31, 2014, a 20-second video was uploaded to YouTube announcing the series. On August 21, 2014, a trailer, lasting 3 minutes and 31 seconds, was uploaded to YouTube showing most of the people interviewed in the series.

== Overview ==
The series eight episodes show the Foo Fighters traveling to eight legendary studios in eight cities across the United States of America to write and record their album, Sonic Highways. The cities visited were Chicago, Washington, D.C., Nashville, Austin, Los Angeles, New Orleans, Seattle and New York. Studios involved with the project include Steve Albini's Electrical Audio in Chicago; Rancho De La Luna in California; Robert Lang Studios in Seattle, Inner Ear Studios in Arlington County, Virginia, and the Magic Shop in New York City.

Each episode features interviews with artists who recorded at the respective studios. Among them are Dolly Parton, Daniel Lanois, Ian MacKaye of Minor Threat and Fugazi, Paul Stanley of Kiss, Joe Walsh of Eagles, Duff McKagan of Guns N' Roses, Nancy Wilson of Heart, Rick Nielsen of Cheap Trick, Zac Brown, and Gary Clark, Jr. There was also collaboration with the Preservation Hall Jazz Band in New Orleans, which led to a live performance with Trombone Shorty. The episodes begin with a quote from a song that was recorded in their respective location and ends with a music video for that same song with animated lyrics appearing in the background.

== Surprise concerts ==
On May 5, 2014, Foo Fighters gave a surprise two-hour concert at 9:30 Club in Washington D.C.

On May 7, 2014, Grohl performed a surprise hour-long solo set at The Bluebird Cafe in Nashville to a crowd of approximately 100 people.

On May 17, 2014, after a week of recording at Preservation Hall, the band played a surprise show for 90-minutes, which proceeded to shut down an entire block of St. Peter Street in New Orleans.

== International broadcast ==
The series aired in the UK on BBC Four starting October 26, 2014. It also aired in Australia on GO! hours after its US broadcast. It was repeated on Channel [V] from February 16, 2015.

== Episodes ==
No.	Title	Original release date
1	"Chicago"	October 17, 2014
Chicago has been a mecca for such diverse acts as Cheap Trick, Etta James, Smashing Pumpkins, Herbie Hancock, Chicago and Kanye West. This episode chronicles the city's musical evolution from the blues of Buddy Guy and Muddy Waters in the '50s and '60s, to the quintessentially midwestern rock of Cheap Trick in the '70s and the punk rock of the '80s, as exemplified by Naked Raygun. At Electrical Audio studios, Dave Grohl and Foo Fighters connect with owner Steve Albini, a Chicago musical icon as a founding member of Big Black and Shellac, who produced and recorded Nirvana's third album, In Utero. Later, they're joined by Cheap Trick's Rick Nielsen to record "Something from Nothing," the first song on Foo Fighters' new album.
2	"Washington D.C"	October 24, 2014
Washington, D.C. is in many ways a city of extremes. Starland Vocal Band, Marvin Gaye, Duke Ellington, Nils Lofgren, Chuck Brown, Henry Rollins, Fugazi and Trouble Funk all hail from D.C. In the early '70s, the music style go-go originated here, and has remained a local craze ever since. Dave Grohl sits down with Trouble Funk's Big Tony Fisher to talk about go-go, and explores its origins with Chuck Brown, the genre's undisputed godfather. He also chats with Don Zientara, owner of Inner Ear Studios, which the Virginia-raised Grohl says "produced the entire soundtrack of my youth," as well as with members of the harDCore band Bad Brains and Ian MacKaye of Teen Idles, Minor Threat and Fugazi, who all recorded at Inner Ear over the decades. The song "The Feast and the Famine" is recorded during this episode.
3	"Nashville"	October 31, 2014
The band heads to Nashville, Tenn. Dave sits down with Dolly Parton, Tony Joe White, Steve Earle, Willie Nelson, Emmylou Harris and producer Tony Brown to discuss Nashville's musical influences and the Nashville sound. Foo Fighters prepare to record at Southern Ground Nashville, owned by country musician Zac Brown, who also guests on the song "Congregation".
4	"Austin"	November 7, 2014
Foo Fighters prepare to record "What Did I Do? / God As My Witness" at the Austin City Limits Studio, with blues guitarist Gary Clark, Jr. Dave chats with Terry Lickona, the executive producer of Austin City Limits. Examining the roots of Austin's music scene, with interviews featuring Billy Gibbons from ZZ Top, and Roky Erickson from 13th Floor Elevators, who is considered one of the American fathers of psychedelic rock. The song "What Did I Do? / God as My Witness" is recorded during this episode.
5	"Los Angeles"	November 14, 2014
Los Angeles' highly influential position in rock history is examined. Pat Smear remembers the days of Germs, and visits legendary KROQ disc jockey Rodney Bingenheimer, owner of a 1970s Sunset Strip club that became the hub for the Los Angeles glam rock scene. Foo Fighters head to the desert to record their new song "Outside", which features a solo from Eagles' guitarist Joe Walsh, at Rancho De La Luna, and in turn, Kyuss and the 1990s Palm Desert Scene is explored.
6	"New Orleans"	November 21, 2014
Dave discussess New Orleans' unique music history with Dr. John, Allen Toussaint and Cyril Neville. The band records in Preservation Hall and also performs with the Preservation Hall Jazz Band. The song "In the Clear" is recorded during this episode.
7	"Seattle"	November 28, 2014
Dave returns to his grunge roots, while Foo Fighters prepare to record with Death Cab for Cutie's Ben Gibbard at Robert Lang Studios, as well as exploring the Seattle music scene. The song "Subterranean" is recorded during this episode.
8	"New York"	December 5, 2014
Dave explores the evolution of the New York music scene. Interviews include Paul Stanley, Jimmy Iovine, Nora Guthrie, Thurston Moore, Chuck D, LL Cool J, Mike D, Rick Rubin and Barack Obama. Foo Fighters record a song at The Magic Shop. The song "I Am a River" is recorded during this episode.

== Charts ==
Chart (2015)	Peak position
Australia Top 40 Audiovisual Chart (ARIA Charts)	1
Belgian DVD Chart (Ultratop)	3
Italian Music DVD (FIMI)	1
UK Music Videos Chart (Official Charts Company)	1
US Music Video Sales (Billboard)	1

== Certifications ==
Region	Certification	Certified units/sales
Australia (ARIA)	Gold	7,500^{^}
Brazil (Pro-Música Brasil)	Gold	15,000^{*}
^{*} Sales figures based on certification alone.^{^} Shipments figures based on certification alone.

== See also ==
- Foo Fighters: Back and Forth
